= Palaya Appaneri =

- Village
- Country: India
- State: Tamilnadu
- District: Thoothukudi

Government
  - Type: Panchayati raj
  - Body: gram panchayat

Languages
  - Official: Tamil
- Time zone: UTC+5:30 (IST)
- PIN: 628502
- Vehicle registration: TN 96 and 69

Palaya Appaneri is a small village located in the Thoothukudi district in the Indian state of Tamil Nadu.

== Geography ==
Kovilpatti is the closest town to Palaya Appaneri village. Palaya Appaneri is easily accessible by bus from Kovilpatti and Elayirampannai.

Palaya Appaneri village is the seat of the Thoothukudi district Panchayat. Palaya Appaneri village is also the Panchayat for Palaya Appaneri or Old Appaneri, Puthu Appaneri or New Appaneri, Puthur (lakshimiyaapuram), Suba Nagar and the area surrounding Suba Nagar, Venkateshwara Nagar and Padmavathi Garden.

Palaya Appaneri village was once part of the Thirunelveli district but is now part of Thoothukudi district.

Palaya Appaneri was the one of village of Sankarankovil tehsil but now kovilpatti is the tehsil for palaya appaneri village.

== Economy ==
The village has a large amount of land suitable for agriculture, but much of this land was converted to other uses. Palaya Appaneri is considered to be a developing village because of its proximity to the Kovilaptti urban center.

Many people living in the area are involved in seasonal agriculture. However, increasing urbanization and slight rainfall have led many farmers to abandon agriculture.

== Representatives ==
=== President ===
Palaya appaneri is a Panchayat.Officially, it is referred to Appaneri panchayat.the Panchayat is including the following areas Palaya Appaneri or Old Appaneri, Puthu Appaneri or New Appaneri, Puthur (lakshimiyaapuram), Suba Nagar and the area surrounding Suba Nagar, Venkateshwara Nagar and Padmavathi Garden .

=== List of Members ===
Year	Winner	Party
2011	AmuthaSubbaih	Independent Candidate
2021	S.Suresh	Independent Candidate

=== Legislative assembly constituency ===
The Sankarankoil (state assembly constituency) is the legislative assembly constituency for palaya Appaneri or Old Appaneri village.

=== List of MLA'S ===
Year	Winner	Party
1971	S. Subbiah	Dravida Munnetra Kazhagam
1977	S. Subbiah	Dravida Munnetra Kazhagam
1980	P. Durairaj	Anna Dravida Munnetra Kazhagam
1984	S. Sankaralingam	Anna Dravida Munnetra Kazhagam
1989	S. Thangavelu	Dravida Munnetra Kazhagam
1991	V. Gopalakrishnan	Anna Dravida Munnetra Kazhagam
1996	C. Karuppasamy	All India Anna Dravida Munnetra Kazhagam
2001	C. Karuppasamy	All India Anna Dravida Munnetra Kazhagam
2006	C. Karuppasamy	All India Anna Dravida Munnetra Kazhagam
2011	C. Karuppasamy	All India Anna Dravida Munnetra Kazhagam
2012	S. Muthuselvi	All India Anna Dravida Munnetra Kazhagam
2016	V. M. Rajalakshmi	All India Anna Dravida Munnetra Kazhagam
2021	E.Raja	Dravida Munnetra Kazhagam

=== Parliamentary Constituency ===
Tenkasi (Lok Sabha constituency) is the parliamentary constituency for Palaya Appaneri or Old Appaneri.

==== List of MP'S ====
Year	Winner	Party	Runner-up	Party
1957	M. Sankarapandian	INC	N. Shanmugham	CPI
1962	M. P. Swamy	INC	S. A. Muruganandam	CPI
1967	R. S. Arumugam	INC	Velu	SWA
1971	A. M. Chellachami	INC	R. S. Arumugam	NCO
1977	M. Arunachalam	INC	S. Rajagopalan	NCO
1980	M. Arunachalam	INC	S. Rajagopalan	JNP
1984	M. Arunachalam	INC	R. Krishnan	CPM
1989	M. Arunachalam	INC	R. Krishnan	CPM
1991	M. Arunachalam	INC	T. Sadhan Thirumalai Kumar	DMK
1996	M. Arunachalam	TMC(M)	V. Selvaraj	INC
1998	S. Murugesan	ADMK	M. Arunachalam	TMC(M)
1999	S. Murugesan	ADMK	S. Arumugam	BJP
2004	M. Appadurai	CPI	S. Murugesan	ADMK
2009	P. Lingam	CPI	K. Vellaipandi	INC
2014	M. Vasanthi	ADMK	K. Krishnasamy	Puthiya Tamilagam
2019	Dhanush M Kumar	DMK	K. Krishnasamy	Puthiya Tamilagam

== Transport ==
Buses are available for every 30 minutes.

- Government buses
- Thirumurugan mini bus
- KKS bus
- K.R. Jayalakshmi bus

== Temples ==
- Vinayagar (Ganesha) temples (4)
- Kaliamman temple
- Chelleyaramman temple
- Bambelamman temple
- Irulappaswamy temples (2)
- Varatharaja perumal temple
- Maadaswamy temple
- Veera vaiyammal temple

== Festival ==
The annual festival is celebrated in the Kaliamman temple. It is usually conducted at the end of May or at the beginning of June in Irulappaswamy.
