= T. Sadhan Tirumalaikumar =

Indian politician

Dr. T. Sadhan Tirumalaikumar
- தி.சதன் திருமலைக்குமார்

Member of the Tamil Nadu Legislative Assembly
- In office 2 May 2021 – 4 May 2026
- Preceded by: A. Manoharan
- Succeeded by: E. Raja
- Constituency: Vasudevanallur
- In office 11 May 2006 – 13 May 2011
- Preceded by: R. Eswaran
- Succeeded by: Dr.S. Duraiappa

Personal details
- Born: Singilipatti, Tamil Nadu
- Party: Marumalarchi Dravida Munnetra Kazhagam (1994-present), Dravida Munnetra Kazhagam (1980-1994)
- Spouse: Chandrakantham
- Children: Jeyanti Priyardarshini
- Parent: Thirumalaiyandi T (father)
- Education: Madurai Kamaraj University
- Occupation: Politician

Dr. T. Sadhan Tirumalaikumar is an Indian politician and a currently serving Member of the Legislative Assembly representing the Vasudevanallur constituency. He is a member of Marumalarchi Dravida Munnetra Kazhagam party. He was elected to the Tamil Nadu legislative assembly from Vasudevanallur constituency in 2006 election as a Marumalarchi Dravida Munnetra Kazhagam candidate.

== Electoral performance ==
=== Lok Sabha Elections ===
Elections	Constituency	Party	Result	Vote percentage	Opposition Candidate	Opposition Party	Opposition vote percentage
1991 Indian general election	Tenkasi	DMK	Lost	33.24	M. Arunachalam	INC	63.56
2014 Indian general election	Tenkasi	MDMK	Lost	18.96	M. Vasanthi	AIADMK	42.31

=== Tamil Nadu State Legislative Assembly Elections ===
Elections	Constituency	Party	Result	Vote percentage	Opposition Candidate	Opposition Party	Opposition vote percentage
1996 Tamil Nadu Legislative Assembly election	Rajapalayam	MDMK	Lost	13.80	V. P. Rajan	DMK	38.62
2001 Tamil Nadu Legislative Assembly election	Sankarankoil	MDMK	Lost	17.25	C. Karuppasamy	AIADMK	43.51
2006 Tamil Nadu Legislative Assembly election	Vasudevanallur	MDMK	Won	40.27	R. Krishnan	CPI(M)	34.33
By-election, 2012	Sankarankoil	MDMK	Lost	12.9	S. Muthuselvi	AIADMK	59.4
2016 Tamil Nadu Legislative Assembly election	Sankarankoil	MDMK	Lost	11.72	V. M. Rajalakshmi	AIADMK	44.36
2021 Tamil Nadu Legislative Assembly election	Vasudevanallur	MDMK	Won	39.57	A. Manoharan	AIADMK	38.20
