= L. Murugan =

Indian politician and lawyer

Dr. Loganathan Murugan
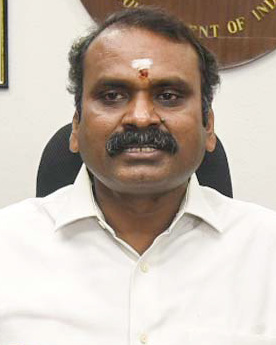
- Murugan in 2024

Union Minister of State for Parliamentary Affairs
- In office 10 June 2024 – 13 October 2026 Serving with Arjun Ram Meghwal
- Minister: Kiren Rijiju
- Preceded by: V. Muraleedharan

Union Minister of State for Information and Broadcasting
- In office 7 July 2021 – 13 October 2026
- Minister: Ashwini Vaishnaw (2024-2026); Anurag Singh Thakur (2021-2024)
- Preceded by: Rajyavardhan Singh Rathore

Union Minister of State for Fisheries, Animal Husbandry and Dairying
- In office 7 July 2021 – 9 June 2024
- Minister: Parshottam Rupala
- Preceded by: Pratap Chandra Sarangi
- Succeeded by: S. P. Singh Baghel; George Kurien

Member of Parliament, Rajya Sabha
- In office 27 September 2021 – 13 October 2026
- Preceded by: Thawar Chand Gehlot
- Succeeded by: Hardeep Singh Puri
- Constituency: Madhya Pradesh

7th State President of Bharatiya Janata Party, Tamil Nadu
- In office 11 March 2020 – 7 July 2021
- Preceded by: Tamilisai Soundararajan
- Succeeded by: K. Annamalai

Vice-Chairman of National Commission for Scheduled Castes
- In office 2017–2020
- Preceded by: Raj Kumar Verka
- Succeeded by: Arun Halder

Personal details
- Born: 29 May 1977 (age 49) Konur, Namakkal district, Tamil Nadu, India
- Party: Bharatiya Janata Party (BJP)
- Spouse: C. Kalaiyarasi (m. 2003)
- Children: 2
- Parent(s): L Varudammal, Loganathan
- Education: Madras Law College (LL.M., Ph.D); Tamil Nadu Dr. Ambedkar Law University (LL.B)

Dr. Loganathan Murugan (born 29 May 1977) is an Indian politician and advocate he served as minister of state in the Ministry of Parliamentary Affairs, and Ministry of Information and Broadcasting. On 7 July 2021, he was made a union minister of state prior to which he was the state president of the Tamil Nadu unit of the Bharatiya Janata Party.

== Personal and early life ==
Murugan is from a Telugu-speaking family. He was born to L Varudammal, Loganathan on 29 May 1977 in Konur of Namakkal district of Tamil Nadu.

Murugan did his law degree at Tamil Nadu Dr. Ambedkar Law College, Chennai and got his master's degree and PhD at University of Madras. Inspired by Hindutva ideology during his college days in 1997, he joined the Akhil Bharatiya Vidyarthi Parishad, and later the Rashtriya Swayamsevak Sangh. He has practiced law for at least 15 years also serving as the Standing Counsel to the Government of India at Madras High Court. As a lawyer He has appeared in various cases on behalf of the BJP.

He is fluent in English, Tamil and Telugu.

== Political career ==
=== Early political career ===
Murugan Served for RSS in his earlier days.

In the 2011 Tamil Nadu Assembly elections, he contested from the Rasipuram seat on a BJP ticket but got only 1800 votes. He served as the in charge of Kerala for some time. He served as the vice-chairman of the National Commission for Scheduled Castes (NCSC) from 2017 to 2020. Murugan later resigned his post in the NCSC before one year of his term's end and met senior BJP leaders.

During the agitations against NEET in Tamil Nadu, Murugan claimed that there were 'external forces' in the Suicide of S. Anitha and said that NEET is required. Murugan claimed that there had been an increase of love jihad in Tamil Nadu in January 2020.

=== BJP state president ===
On 12 March 2020, he was made chief of the BJP Tamil Nadu unit. L. Murugan became the second Dalit leader to serve as the president of the BJP Tamil Nadu unit, after Kirubanidhi, who held the position from 2000 to 2003.

Murugan was supportive of the Citizenship (Amendment) Act, 2019. He was not very close to the leaders of Tamil Nadu BJP but was close with the National BJP leaders. Murugan attempted to lead the BJP's Vel Yatra twice in 2020 to build support for Hindutva politics in Tamil Nadu, but was arrested both times. Chief Minister of Puducherry V Narayanasamy said Vel yatra is a move by BJP to foment communal disharmony. He called the 2020–2021 Indian farmers' protest in Delhi as "false propaganda" in December 2020.

He contested the 2021 Tamil Nadu assembly elections from Dharapuram and lost to DMK's N. Kayalvizhi by 1,393 votes.

=== Union minister ===
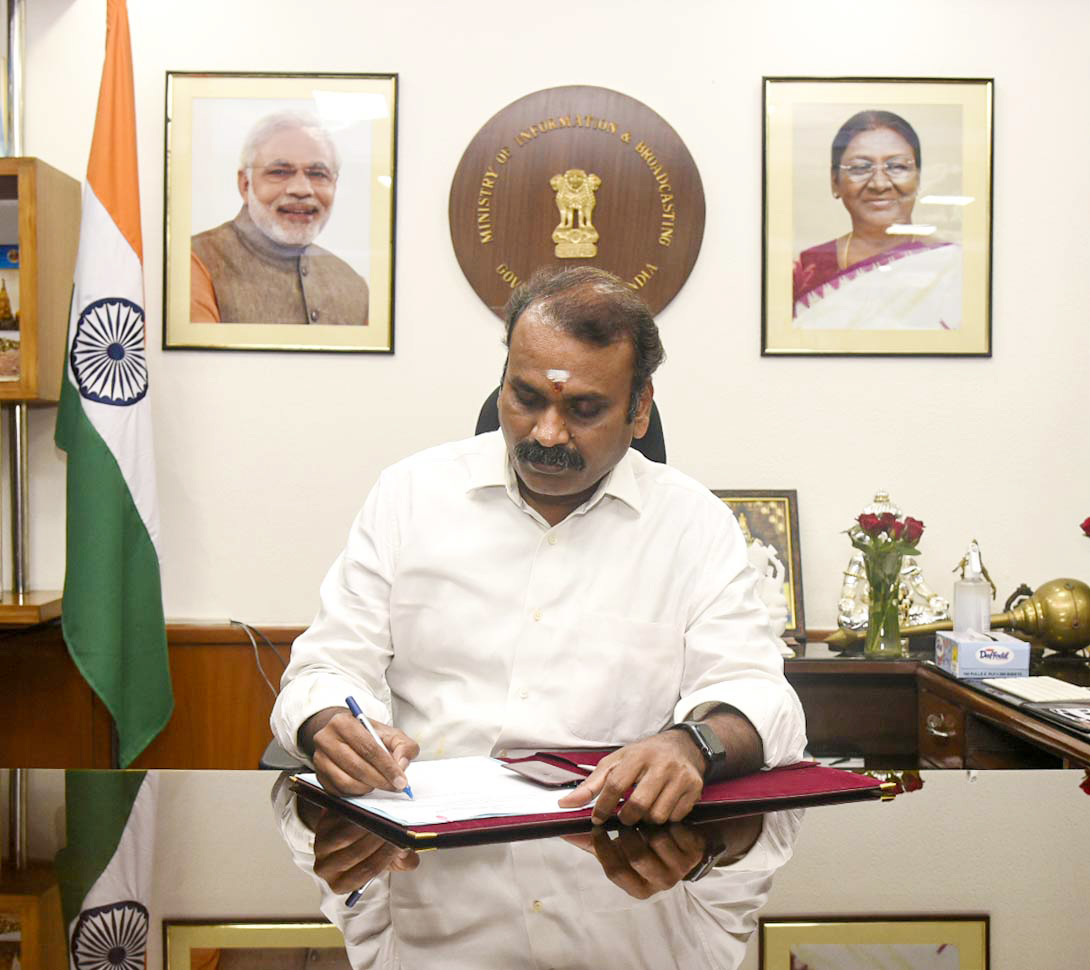
Murugan assuming charge as the Minister of State for Information & Broadcasting.

On 7 July 2021, Murugan was sworn in as the Minister of State in the Ministry of Fisheries, Animal Husbandry and Dairying and Ministry of Information and Broadcasting during the Cabinet reshuffle. Murugan is the first from the Arunthathiyar community to be made a Union minister since Independence. He had 21 criminal cases against him in August 2021, the most of any minister in the Modi's cabinet. Murugan claimed there were "vested interests" behind the 2020–2021 Indian farmers' protest in northern states in October 2021.

He is member of Rajya Sabha representing Madhya Pradesh.

== Positions held ==
Commission / Office	Position	Tenure	
Commission / Office	Position	From	To
National Commission for Scheduled Castes (NCSC)	Vice-Chairman	2017	2020
Bharatiya Janata Party	State-President of Tamilnadu	11 March 2020	7 July 2021

== Ministry ==
Designation	Department	Party	Constituency	Ministry	Term of Office	
Designation	Department	Party	Constituency	Ministry	From	To
Minister of State	Ministry of Fisheries, Animal Husbandry and Dairying	BJP	Member of Parliament, Rajya Sabha from Madhya Pradesh	Modi II	7 July 2021	9 June 2024
Minister of State	Ministry of Fisheries, Animal Husbandry and Dairying	BJP	Ministry of Information and Broadcasting	Modi II Modi III	7 July 2021	13 Oct 2026

== Elections contested ==
=== Tamilnadu State Legislative Assembly Elections ===
Elections	Constituency	Party	Result	Votes Gained	Vote %	Opposition Candidate	Opposition Party
2011	Rasipuram	BJP	Lost	1,730	0.07	P. Dhanapal	AIADMK
2012 (By-election)	Sankarankoil	BJP	Lost	1,633	0.1	S. Muthuselvi	AIADMK
2021	Dharapuram	BJP	Lost	88,593	45.67%	N. Kayalvizhi	DMK
2026	Avanashi	BJP	Lost	68,836	29.72%	S. Kamali	TVK

=== Lok Sabha Elections ===
Elections	Constituency	Party	Result	Votes Gained	Vote %	Opposition Candidate	Opposition Party
2024	Nilgiris	BJP	Lost	232,627	22.83%	A. Raja	DMK

=== Rajya Sabha ===
Position	Party	Constituency	From	To	Tenure
Member of Parliament, Rajya Sabha (1st Term)	BJP	Madhya Pradesh	27 September 2021	2 April 2024	2 years, 188 days
Member of Parliament, Rajya Sabha (2nd Term)	BJP	Madhya Pradesh	3 April 2024	2 April 2030	5 years, 364 days

== See also ==
- Third Modi ministry
