= Tamil Maanila Kamraj Congress =

- Leader: Dr. Kumaradas
- Founded: 2002
- Headquarters: c/o F.B. Benjamin George, Advocate, No.17, Dooming Street, Santhome, Chennai - 600004

Tamil Maanila Kamraj Congress is a political party in the Indian state of Tamil Nadu.

== Background ==
The party was formed in December 2002 through a split in the Tamil Maanila Congress. The party is led by Kumaradas (president), R. Eswaran (vice-president), Hakkim (general secretary), and Teni Jayakumar (treasurer). Five members of the Tamil Nadu legislative assembly have joined the party.
