= Sankarankoil taluk =

Sankarankovil Taluk is a taluk of Tenkasi district of the Indian state of Tamil Nadu. The headquarters is the town of Sankarankoil.

== Demographics ==
According to the 2011 census, the taluk of Sankarankoil had a population of 349,050 with 172,250 males and 176,800 females. There were 1026 women for every 1000 men. The taluk had a literacy rate of 68.4. Child population in the age group below 6 was 16,923 Males and 16,384 Females.

== List of Villages ==
List of Places in Sankarankovil Taluk Tirunelveli District:

- A.Madurapuri
- Achampatty
- Alagapuri
- Alankulam
- Palaya Appaneri
- Arianayagipuram
- Athipatti
- Ayyaneri
- Chatrakondan
- Chatrapatti
- Chenthattiapuram
- Chettikulam
- Chidhambarapuram
- Chinnakovilankulam
- Chitrampatti
- Devarkulam
- Duraisamy Puram
- Echandha
- Elanthaikulam
- Ilayarajanendal
- Jamin Devarkulam
- K.Karisalkulam
- Kalapalankulam
- Kalappakulam
- Kalingapatti
- Karisal Kulam
- Karisathan
- Karivalamvandanallur
- Keela Veerasigamani
- Keelaneelithanallur
- Ko-Maruthappapuram
- Kulakattakuruchi
- Kulasekaramangalam
- Kulasekaraperi
- Kurukkalpatti
- Kurunjakulam
- Kuruvikulam
- Kuvalaikanni
- Lakshmiammalpuram
- Madathupatti
- Madurapuri
- Mahendravadi
- Maipparai
- Malaiyankulam
- Manalur
- Mangudi
- Maruthenkinaru
- Mela Ilandaikulam
- Melaneelithanallur
- Moovirunthali
- Mukkuttumalai
- Naduvakurichi Major
- Naduvakurichi Minor
- Naduvapatti
- Nakkalamuthampatti
- Nalanthula
- Naluvasankottai
- Narikudi
- Nochikulam
- Panaiyur
- Panthapuli
- Paruvakkudi
- Pattataikatti
- Pazhamkottai
- Peria Kovilankulam
- Periyur
- Perumalpatti
- Perumbathur
- Perunkottur
- Pillaiyarnatham
- Pitchaithalaivanpatti
- Poigai
- Puliangulam
- Punnaivanam
- Ramalingapuram
- Ramanathapuram
- Rengasamudram
- S.V.Puram Karadiyudaippu
- Sangarankoil
- Sangupatti
- sathirakondan
- Sennikulam
- Sernthamangalam
- Sevalkulam
- South Kuruvikulam
- Subbulapuram
- Sundankurichi
- Sundaresapuram
- Thadiampatti
- Therkku Sankarankovil
- Thiruvengadam
- Thiruvettanallur
- Usilangulam
- Usilankulam
- Vadakku Panavadaly
- Vadakku Pudur
- Vadakku Puliampatti
- Vadakkupatti
- Vadikottai
- Vagaikulam
- Vanniconendal
- Varaganoor
- Vayali
- Vazhavandhapuram
- Veerasigamani
- Veeriruppu
- Vellakulam
- Vellalankulam
- Vellappaneri
- Venkatachalapuram
- Vijayarengapuram
- moovirunthali
