= V. S. Kalimuthu =

Indian politician

Member-Tamil Nadu Legislative Assembly
- In office 2016–2021
- Preceded by: K. Ponnusamy
- Succeeded by: N. Kayalvizhi
- Constituency: Dharapuram

Personal details
- Born: 20 March 1961 Dharapuram
- Party: Indian National Congress
- Profession: Agriculture

V. S. Kalimuthu is an Indian politician and a former member of the Tamil Nadu Legislative Assembly.

== Early life ==
He was born in Dharapuram town in the Tiruppur district. Kalimuthu, completed his 10th standard in the year 1977. He is a member of the Indian National Congress party. He contested and won the election for the Dharapuram assembly constituency in the 2016 Tamil Nadu Legislative Assembly election, becoming a Member of the Legislative Assembly (MLA).

== Electoral performance ==
=== 2016 ===
2016 Tamil Nadu Legislative Assembly election: Dharapuram
Party	Candidate	Votes	%	±%
INC	V. S. Kalimuthu	83,538	45.67%	
AIADMK	K. Ponnusamy	73,521	40.19%	−11.49%
BJP	M. Shanmugham	7,753	4.24%	2.17%
MDMK	Nagai Thiruvalluvan	7,029	3.84%	
NOTA	None Of The Above	2,883	1.58%	
KMDK	K. Palaniammal	1,662	0.91%	
PMK	K. Madhavan	1,515	0.83%	
NTK	R. Pichaimuthu	1,350	0.74%	
Independent	M. Vanitha	849	0.46%	
Independent	V. Palanisamy	835	0.46%	
BSP	V. Selvaraj	681	0.37%	−0.48%
Margin of victory		10,017	5.48%	−3.78%
Turnout		182,911	76.83%	−2.26%
Registered electors		238,070		
INC gain from AIADMK		Swing	-6.01%	
