= C. Karuppasamy =

Indian politician

- கருப்பசாமி
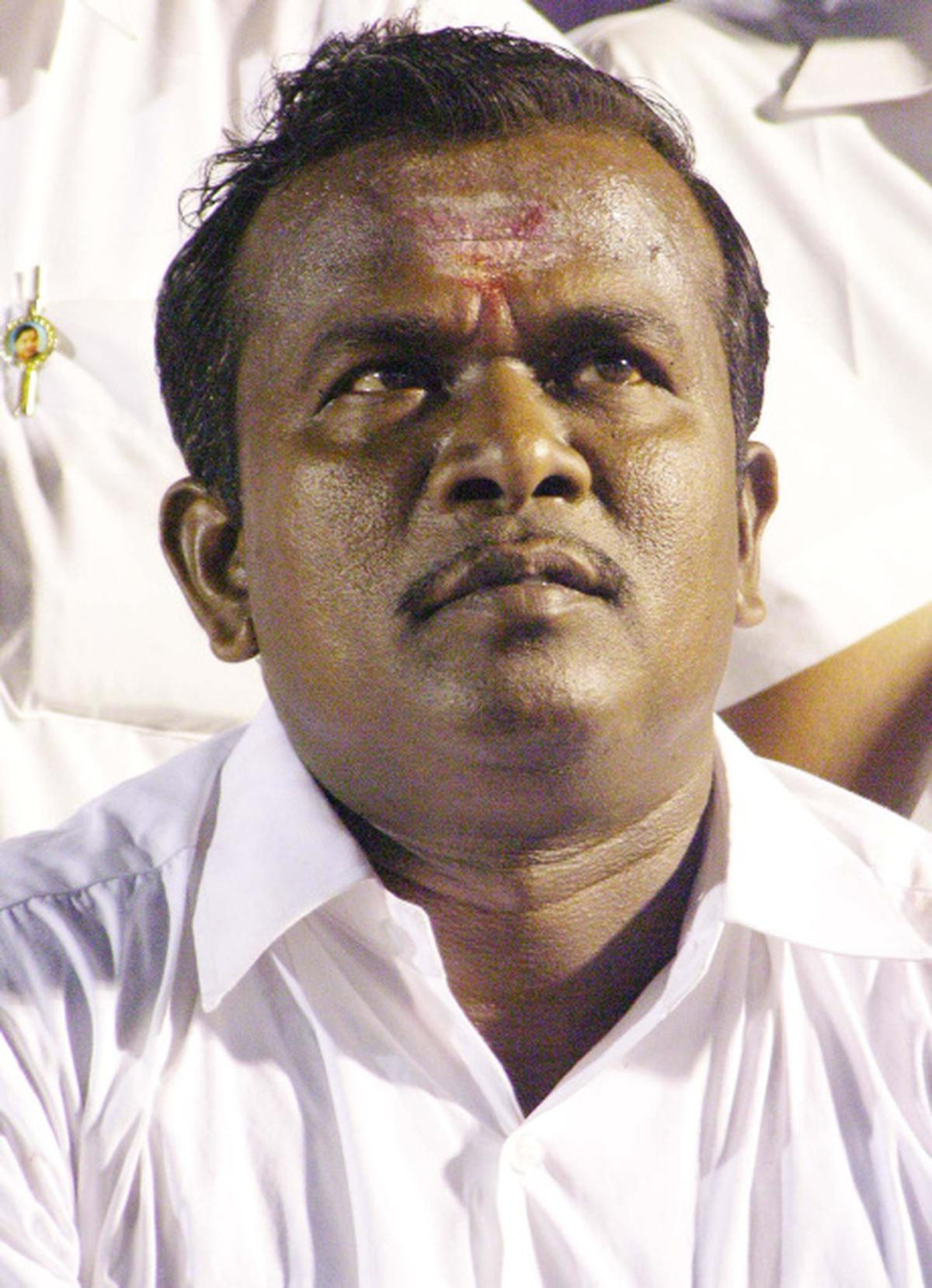
- Former Minister Karuppasamy

Minister without portfolio
- In office 3 July 2011 – 22 October 2011
- Chief Minister: Jayalalithaa
- Constituency: Sankarankoil

Minister for Sports and Youth Welfare
- In office June 2011 – 3 July 2011
- Chief Minister: Jayalalithaa
- Constituency: Sankarankoil

Minister of Animal Husbandry
- In office 16 May 2011 – June 2011
- Chief Minister: Jayalalithaa
- Constituency: Sankarankoil

Member of the Legislative Assembly
- In office 10 May 1996 – 22 October 2011
- Preceded by: V. Gopalakrishnan
- Succeeded by: S. Muthuselvi
- Constituency: Sankarankoil

Personal details
- Born: 22 March 1955 Puliyampatti, Tirunelveli district, Madras State (now Tamil Nadu, India)
- Died: 22 October 2011 Chennai, Tamil Nadu, India
- Party: All India Anna Dravida Munnetra Kazhagam
- Spouse: Muthumari
- Children: 2
- Religion: Hinduism

C. Karuppasamy (22 March 1955 – 22 October 2011) was an Indian politician and a former minister in the Government of Tamil Nadu and four time Member of the Legislative Assembly from the Sankarankoil Assembly constituency in 1996, 2001, 2006 and 2011 as a member of the All India Anna Dravida Munnetra Kazhagam (AIDMK) party.

== Personal life ==
Karuppasamy was born on 22 March 1955 at Puliyampatti in Tirunelveli district. He died while receiving treatment for cancer at the age of 56, in a private hospital in Chennai on 22 October 2011. He had a wife, a daughter and son.

== Political career ==
He was President of Kallappakulam Panchayat in Tirunelveli district between 1986 and 1991. He was one of only four ADMK candidates to be elected to the Tamil Nadu legislative assembly from Sankarankoil Assembly constituency in 1996, when the Dravida Munnetra Kazhagam routed their opposition, and then he continued to hold the seat till his death in 2011.

== Elections contested ==
=== Tamil Nadu Legislative Assembly Elections ===
Elections	Constituency	Party	Result	Vote percentage	Opposition candidate	Opposition party	Opposition vote percentage
1996 Tamil Nadu Legislative Assembly election	Sankarankoil	AIADMK	Won	33.94%	S. Rasiah alias Raja	DMK	33.41%
2001 Tamil Nadu Legislative Assembly election	Sankarankoil	AIADMK	Won	43.51%	P. Duraisamy	PT	35.76%
2006 Tamil Nadu Legislative Assembly election	Sankarankoil	AIADMK	Won	40.33%	S. Thangavelu	DMK	36.79%
2011 Tamil Nadu Legislative Assembly election	Sankarankoil	AIADMK	Won	49.99%	M. Umamaheswari	DMK	42.80%

=== Positions held ===
- 1989–1996: was elected as the president of Kallappakulam Panchayat in Tirunelveli district
- 1996–2001: was elected to Tamilnadu State Legislative Assembly (Eleventh) for the 1st time
- 2001–2006: was elected to Tamilnadu State Legislative Assembly (Twelfth) for the 2nd time
- 2001–2006: was appointed the Minister for Adi Dravidar Welfare in the Cabinet
- 2006–2011: was elected to Tamilnadu State Legislative Assembly (Thirteenth) for the 3rd time
- May–October 2011: was elected to Tamilnadu State Legislative Assembly (Fourteenth) for the 3rd time
- May–June 2011: was appointed the minister for Animal Husbandry in the Cabinet
- June–July 2011: was appointed the minister for Sports and Youth Welfare in the Cabinet
- July–October 2011: was designated as a minister without portfolio in the Cabinet

== Death ==
He died in October 2011, while undergoing treatment for cancer at Chennai.
