= N. Kayalvizhi =

Indian politician

Minister for Human Resources Management (Tamil Nadu)
- In office 28 September 2024 – 5 May 2026
- Chief Minister: M. K. Stalin
- Preceded by: Thangam Thennarasu
- Succeeded by: D. Sarathkumar

Minister for Adi Dravidar and Tribal Welfare Government of Tamil Nadu
- In office 7 May 2021 – 28 September 2024
- Chief Minister: M. K. Stalin
- Preceded by: V. M. Rajalakshmi
- Succeeded by: M. Mathiventhan

Member of Tamil Nadu Legislative Assembly
- In office 2 May 2021 – 4 May 2026
- Preceded by: Kalimuthu V.S
- Succeeded by: P. Sathyabama
- Constituency: Dharapuram

Personal details
- Born: 1969 (age 56–57)
- Party: Dravida Munnetra Kazhagam
- Spouse: K. Selvaraj
- Education: M.Com, B.Ed
- Alma mater: Madras University
- Profession: Politician

N. Kayalvizhi is an Indian politician and a Member of Tamil Nadu Legislative Assembly representing Dharapuram. She belongs to the Dravida Munnetra Kazhagam party. Kayalvizhi was the Minister for Human Resources Management in Tamil Nadu since 7 May 2021 till 5 May 2026.

== Education ==
She has qualified as a Master of Commerce (M.Com) at Trichy in the year 1993. She also qualified with a Bachelor of Education (B.Ed.) at Madras University in 1994.

== Profession ==
She is a politician by profession. She is active in politics since 1996 as a member of DMK - Women Wing.

== Legislative member ==
She contested the 2021 election for Tamil Nadu Legislative Assembly from the Dharapuram constituency in the Tiruppur District, and won against the BJP's state president L. Murugan.

== Ministry ==
Designation	Portfolio	Party	Ministry	Tenure	
Designation	Portfolio	Party	Ministry	Took Office	Left Office
Minister of Adi Dravidar Welfare	Adi Dravidar Welfare, Hill Tribes and Bonded Labour Welfare	DMK	M.K.Stalin	7 May 2021	Incumbent

== Elections contested and results ==
Elections	Constituency	Party	Result	Votes Gained	Vote %	Opposition Candidate	Opposition Party
2021 Tamil Nadu Elections	Dharapuram	DMK	Won	89,986	46.39 %	L. Murugan	BJP
