= S. Duraiappa =

Indian politician

Dr. S. Duraiappa is an Indian politician and was a member of the 14th Tamil Nadu Legislative Assembly from the Vasudevanallur constituency, which is reserved for candidates from the Scheduled Castes. He represented the All India Anna Dravida Munnetra Kazhagam party.

The elections of 2016 resulted in his constituency being won by A. Manoharan.
