= R. Krishnan (Vasudevanallur politician) =

Indian politician

R. Krishnan was a Tamil politician and former Member of the Legislative Assembly. He was elected to the Tamil Nadu legislative assembly as a Communist Party of India (Marxist) candidate from Vasudevanallur constituency in 1977 and 1980 elections.

He contested twice from Tenkasi Lok Sabha constituency in 1984 and 1989 elections and lost both to M. Arunachalam.
