= Rani Srikumar =

Indian politician

Member of Parliament, Lok Sabha
- Incumbent
- Assumed office 4 June 2024
- Preceded by: Dhanush M. Kumar
- Constituency: Tenkasi

Personal details
- Born: Sankarankovil, Tenkasi district, Tamilnadu
- Party: Dravida Munnetra Kazhagam
- Spouse: Srikumar
- Children: 1
- Occupation: Politician, Doctor, Anesthesiologist

Rani Srikumar is an Indian politician and doctor. She was elected to the Lok Sabha, lower house of the Parliament of India from Tenkasi, Tamil Nadu in the 2024 Indian general election as member of the Dravida Munnetra Kazhagam.
