= Dharapuram Assembly constituency =

State Legislative Assembly Constituency in Tamil Nadu

Coordinates: 10.73°N 77.52°E

Dharapuram
- Constituency No. 101 for the Tamil Nadu Legislative Assembly

Constituency details
- Country: India
- Region: South India
- State: Tamil Nadu
- District: Tiruppur
- Lok Sabha constituency: Erode
- Established: 1951
- Total electors: 2,23,247
- Reservation: SC

Member of Legislative Assembly
- 17th Tamil Nadu Legislative Assembly
- Incumbent P. Sathyabama
- Party: TVK
- Alliance: TVK+
- Elected year: 2026^

Dharapuram is a legislative assembly constituency that includes the city of Dharapuram. Its State Assembly Constituency number is 101. Dharapuram Assembly constituency is part of Erode Lok Sabha constituency. It is one of the 234 State Legislative Assembly Constituencies in Tamil Nadu, in India.

== Members of Legislative Assembly ==
=== Madras State ===
Year	Winner	Party
1952	A. Senapathi Gounder	Indian National Congress
1957	A. Senapathi Gounder	Indian National Congress
1962	Parvathi Anjuman	Indian National Congress
1967	Palaniammal	Dravida Munnetra Kazhagam

=== Tamil Nadu ===
Year	Winner	Party
1971	V.P. Palaniammal	Dravida Munnetra Kazhagam
1977	R. Ayyachamy	All India Anna Dravida Munnetra Kazhagam
1980	A. Periasamy	All India Anna Dravida Munnetra Kazhagam
1984	A. Periasamy	All India Anna Dravida Munnetra Kazhagam
1989	T. Santhakumari	Dravida Munnetra Kazhagam
1991	P. Eswaramurthi	All India Anna Dravida Munnetra Kazhagam
1996	R. Saraswathy	Dravida Munnetra Kazhagam
2001	V. Sivakami	Pattali Makkal Katchi
2006	P. Prabavathi	Dravida Munnetra Kazhagam
2011	K. Ponnusamy	All India Anna Dravida Munnetra Kazhagam
2016	V. S. Kalimuthu	Indian National Congress
2021	N. Kayalvizhi	Dravida Munnetra Kazhagam
2026	P. Sathyabama	All India Anna Dravida Munnetra Kazhagam
2026^	P. Sathyabama	Tamilaga Vettri Kazhagam

^ upcoming by-election following P. Sathyabama's resignation on 25 May 2026 to join Tamilaga Vettri Kazhagam

== Election results ==
Vote share of winning candidates
2026 By-election	37.02%
2026	40.56%
2021	46.85%
2016	45.67%
2011	51.68%
2006	44.65%
2001	50.49%
1996	55.49%
1991	65.49%
1989	33.69%
1984	59.09%
1980	56.05%
1977	31.67%
1971	64.41%
1967	65.00%
1962	57.45%
1957	47.13%
1952	39.72%

=== 2026 By-election ===
2026 Tamil Nadu Legislative Assembly Bye-election: Dharapuram
Party	Candidate	Votes	%	±%
TVK	P. Sathyabama	66,841	37.02	▲13.79
DMK	S. Suganya	57,370	31.78	▼0.42
AIADMK	K. Banumathi	45,280	25.08	▼15.48
NTK	M. Karthika	5,268	2.92	▼0.09
CPI	Lakshmanan P	1,157	0.64	New entry
Independent	Independent candidates	3,638	2.01	
Others	Other party candidates	301	0.17	
NOTA	None of the above	677	0.38	
Margin of victory		9,471	5.24	−3.12
Turnout		1,80,620	80.30	−8.84
Registered electors		2,23,247		
TVK gain from AIADMK		Swing	+13.79	

=== 2026 ===
2026 Tamil Nadu Legislative Assembly election: Dharapuram
Party	Candidate	Votes	%	±%
AIADMK	P. Sathyabama	81,100	40.56	New
DMK	T. Indirani	64,373	32.20	▼14.65
TVK	Gowri Chitra	46,438	23.23	New
NTK	Dhivya	6,026	3.01	▼0.51
NOTA	NOTA	1,058	0.53	▼0.46
Margin of victory		16,727	8.36	▲7.63
Turnout		2,00,101	89.96	▲15.66
Registered electors		2,22,434		▼36,113
AIADMK gain from DMK		Swing	New	

=== 2021 ===
2021 Tamil Nadu Legislative Assembly election: Dharapuram
Party	Candidate	Votes	%	±%
DMK	N. Kayalvizhi	89,986	46.85	
BJP	L. Murugan	88,593	46.12	41.88
NTK	K. Ranjitha	6,753	3.52	2.78
MNM	A. Charli	2,130	1.11	
NOTA	Nota	1,903	0.99	−0.59
AMMK	C. Kalarani	1,172	0.61	
Margin of victory		1,393	0.73	−4.75
Turnout		192,088	74.30	−2.54
Rejected ballots		514	0.27	
Registered electors		258,547		
DMK gain from INC		Swing	1.17	

=== 2016 ===
2016 Tamil Nadu Legislative Assembly election: Dharapuram
Party	Candidate	Votes	%	±%
INC	V. S. Kalimuthu	83,538	45.67	
AIADMK	K. Ponnusamy	73,521	40.19	−11.49
BJP	M. Shanmugham	7,753	4.24	2.17
MDMK	Nagai Thiruvalluvan	7,029	3.84	
NOTA	None Of The Above	2,883	1.58	
KMDK	K. Palaniammal	1,662	0.91	
PMK	K. Madhavan	1,515	0.83	
NTK	R. Pichaimuthu	1,350	0.74	
Independent	M. Vanitha	849	0.46	
Independent	V. Palanisamy	835	0.46	
BSP	V. Selvaraj	681	0.37	−0.48
Margin of victory		10,017	5.48	−3.78
Turnout		182,911	76.83	−2.26
Registered electors		238,070		
INC gain from AIADMK		Swing	-6.01	

=== 2011 ===
2011 Tamil Nadu Legislative Assembly election: Dharapuram
Party	Candidate	Votes	%	±%
AIADMK	K. Ponnusamy	83,856	51.68	10.83
DMK	R. Jayanthi	68,831	42.42	−2.23
BJP	P. Karunakaran	3,353	2.07	0.49
Independent	R. Rajesh	2,882	1.78	
BSP	S. Arumugam	1,378	0.85	−0.31
Independent	A. Sundrarasu	1,159	0.71	
Independent	D. Doraisamy	789	0.49	
Margin of victory		15,025	9.26	5.46
Turnout		205,145	79.09	7.71
Registered electors		162,248		
AIADMK gain from DMK		Swing	7.03	

=== 2006 ===
2006 Tamil Nadu Legislative Assembly election: Dharapuram
Party	Candidate	Votes	%	±%
DMK	P. Prabavathi	55,312	44.65	13.84
AIADMK	M. Ranganayahi	50,600	40.85	
DMDK	K. N. K. Jyothipaandiyan	11,288	9.11	
BJP	E. Santhi	1,949	1.57	
Independent	P. Ponnusamy	1,538	1.24	
BSP	C. Jeya	1,435	1.16	
Independent	D. Nachimuthu	917	0.74	
Independent	M. Kulandaivelu	832	0.67	
Margin of victory		4,712	3.80	−15.88
Turnout		123,871	71.38	10.69
Registered electors		173,547		
DMK gain from PMK		Swing	-5.84	

=== 2001 ===
2001 Tamil Nadu Legislative Assembly election: Dharapuram
Party	Candidate	Votes	%	±%
PMK	V. Sivakami	56,835	50.49	
DMK	R. Sareswathi	34,683	30.81	−24.68
MDMK	Dr. T. Shanthakumari	15,845	14.08	6.76
Independent	R. Eswaravel	5,201	4.62	
Margin of victory		22,152	19.68	−0.93
Turnout		112,564	60.68	−11.30
Registered electors		185,498		
PMK gain from DMK		Swing	-5.00	

=== 1996 ===
1996 Tamil Nadu Legislative Assembly election: Dharapuram
Party	Candidate	Votes	%	±%
DMK	R. Saraswathy	62,027	55.49	27.38
AIADMK	P. Easwaramurthi	38,989	34.88	−30.61
MDMK	K. Mayavan	8,182	7.32	
BJP	K. P. Velliangiri	1,368	1.22	−1.89
PMK	K. Vincent	583	0.52	
Independent	A. Subramanian	310	0.28	
Independent	K. Mariappan	204	0.18	
Independent	P. Rajendran	109	0.10	
Margin of victory		23,038	20.61	−16.76
Turnout		111,772	71.98	6.79
Registered electors		164,190		
DMK gain from AIADMK		Swing	-9.99	

=== 1991 ===
1991 Tamil Nadu Legislative Assembly election: Dharapuram
Party	Candidate	Votes	%	±%
AIADMK	P. Eswaramurthi	66,490	65.49	33.22
DMK	T. Shanthakumari	28,545	28.11	−5.58
BJP	E. K. Elangandhi	3,166	3.12	
PMK	M. C. Anbu Selvan	2,359	2.32	
JP	M. Palaniappan	375	0.37	
THMM	A. Subramanian	318	0.31	
Independent	T. P. S. Arumugam	223	0.22	
Independent	G. Nagarajan	54	0.05	
Margin of victory		37,945	37.37	35.95
Turnout		101,530	65.20	−6.44
Registered electors		162,002		
AIADMK gain from DMK		Swing	31.80	

=== 1989 ===
1989 Tamil Nadu Legislative Assembly election: Dharapuram
Party	Candidate	Votes	%	±%
DMK	T. Santhakumari	34,069	33.69	−7.22
AIADMK	A. Periasamy	32,633	32.27	−26.82
INC	K. Karpegavalli Selvi	27,517	27.21	
Independent	K. Thurkaivel Krishna Moorthi Alias T. V. Kirshnamoorthi	5,075	5.02	
Independent	S. Vedanayagam	666	0.66	
Independent	S. Gopal	576	0.57	
Independent	A. K. Balakirshnan	301	0.30	
Independent	S. Kalimuthu	287	0.28	
Margin of victory		1,436	1.42	−16.75
Turnout		101,124	71.63	0.47
Registered electors		144,747		
DMK gain from AIADMK		Swing	-25.40	

=== 1984 ===
1984 Tamil Nadu Legislative Assembly election: Dharapuram
Party	Candidate	Votes	%	±%
AIADMK	A. Periasamy	51,919	59.09	3.04
DMK	R. Ayyasamy	35,951	40.91	−1.64
Margin of victory		15,968	18.17	4.67
Turnout		87,870	71.16	7.10
Registered electors		128,788		
AIADMK hold		Swing	3.04	

=== 1980 ===
1980 Tamil Nadu Legislative Assembly election: Dharapuram
Party	Candidate	Votes	%	±%
AIADMK	A. Periasamy	43,319	56.05	24.38
DMK	V. P. Palaniammal	32,887	42.55	18.76
Independent	K. Nagarajan	542	0.70	
Independent	A. K. Balakrishnan	332	0.43	
Independent	K. Krishnan	205	0.27	
Margin of victory		10,432	13.50	9.00
Turnout		77,285	64.06	12.95
Registered electors		122,884		
AIADMK hold		Swing	24.38	

=== 1977 ===
1977 Tamil Nadu Legislative Assembly election: Dharapuram
Party	Candidate	Votes	%	±%
AIADMK	R. Ayyachamy	18,884	31.67	
INC	A. K. Shivalingam	16,202	27.17	−6.80
DMK	D. G. Rajendran	14,187	23.79	−40.61
JP	A. Muniappan	5,976	10.02	
Independent	A. K. Balakrishnan	3,255	5.46	
Independent	K. Nagarajan	1,123	1.88	
Margin of victory		2,682	4.50	−25.94
Turnout		59,627	51.11	−15.76
Registered electors		119,032		
AIADMK gain from DMK		Swing	-32.74	

=== 1971 ===
1971 Tamil Nadu Legislative Assembly election: Dharapuram
Party	Candidate	Votes	%	±%
DMK	V. P. Palaniammal	40,947	64.41	−0.59
INC	V. N. Gopal	21,597	33.97	0.58
Independent	T. Manoharan	1,031	1.62	
Margin of victory		19,350	30.44	−1.17
Turnout		63,575	66.87	−7.54
Registered electors		98,869		
DMK hold		Swing	-0.59	

=== 1967 ===
1967 Madras Legislative Assembly election: Dharapuram
Party	Candidate	Votes	%	±%
DMK	Palaniammal	42,433	65.00	37.58
INC	P. Velusamy	21,800	33.39	−24.06
Independent	S. Gurunathan	1,052	1.61	
Margin of victory		20,633	31.60	1.57
Turnout		65,285	74.41	6.27
Registered electors		90,991		
DMK gain from INC		Swing	7.55	

=== 1962 ===
1962 Madras Legislative Assembly election: Dharapuram
Party	Candidate	Votes	%	±%
INC	Parvathi Anjuman	37,842	57.45	10.32
DMK	A. R. Subramanian	18,059	27.42	
PSP	N. Lingasami Gounder	9,969	15.13	
Margin of victory		19,783	30.03	28.94
Turnout		65,870	68.14	10.68
Registered electors		100,631		
INC hold		Swing	10.32	

=== 1957 ===
1957 Madras Legislative Assembly election: Dharapuram
Party	Candidate	Votes	%	±%
INC	A. Senapathi Gounder	26,164	47.13	15.32
Independent	P. S. Govindaswamy Gounder	25,555	46.03	
PSP	N. L. Lingaswamy Gounder	3,796	6.84	
Margin of victory		609	1.10	−6.81
Turnout		55,515	57.46	−3.55
Registered electors		96,614		
INC gain from Independent		Swing	7.41	

=== 1952 ===
1952 Madras Legislative Assembly election: Dharapuram
Party	Candidate	Votes	%	±%
Independent	A. Senapathi Gounder	17,085	39.72	
INC	Nataraja Gounder	13,683	31.81	31.81
Independent	Muthuswami Gounder	7,094	16.49	
Socialist Party (India)	Lingaswami Gounder	4,124	9.59	
Independent	Vadivelu	1,028	2.39	
Margin of victory		3,402	7.91	
Turnout		43,014	61.01	
Registered electors		70,501		
Independent win (new seat)				

== See also ==
Dharapuram Lok Sabha constituency
