= A. Velladurai =

Indian politician

A. Velladurai was an Indian politician and former Member of the Legislative Assembly. He was elected to the Tamil Nadu legislative assembly as a Dravida Munnetra Kazhagam candidate from Vasudevanallur constituency in the 1967 and 1971 elections.
