= S. Murugesan (AIADMK politician) =

Indian politician

Member of the India Parliament for Tenkasi
- In office 10 March 1998 – 16 May 2004
- Constituency: Tenkasi

Personal details
- Party: All India Anna Dravida Munnetra Kazhagam
- Spouse: M. Vasanthi
- Children: 4
- Occupation: Political and Social Worker

S. Murugesan is an Indian politician and former Member of Parliament elected from Tamil Nadu. He was elected to the Lok Sabha from Tenkasi constituency as an Anna Dravida Munnetra Kazhagam candidate in 1998, and 1999 elections. His wife, Vasanthi Murugesan was elected from the same constituency in 2014 election as All India Anna Dravida Munnetra Kazhagam candidate.

== Elections Contested ==
=== Lok Sabha Elections ===
Elections	Constituency	Party	Result	Vote percentage	Opposition Candidate	Opposition Party	Opposition vote percentage
1998	Tenkasi	AIADMK	Won	41.84	M. Arunachalam	TMC(M)	26.77
1999	Tenkasi	AIADMK	Won	35.88	S. Arumugam	BJP	35.74
2004	Tenkasi	AIADMK	Lost	31.71	M. Appadurai	CPI	48.87
