= R. Saraswathy =

Indian politician

R. Saraswathy was elected to the Tamil Nadu Legislative Assembly from the Dharapuram constituency in the 1996 elections. She was a candidate of the Dravida Munnetra Kazhagam (DMK) party.
