= Arianayagipuram =

- village
- Location in Tamil Nadu, India
- Coordinates: 9°6′10″N 77°25′28″E
- Country: India
- State: Tamil Nadu
- District: Tenkasi

Population (2007)
  - Total: Approx−30K

Languages
  - Official: Tamil
- Time zone: UTC+5:30 (IST)
- PIN: 627862
- Telephone code: 4636
- Vehicle registration: TN-72 & TN-76
- Nearest city: Sankarankoil
- Lok Sabha constituency: Tenkasi
- Vidhan Sabha constituency: Vasudevanallur
- Climate: Min 18 Deg Celsius Max 35 Deg Celsius (Köppen)

Arianayagipuram is a village in Tenkasi district and one of the gram panchayats in Sankarankoil taluk of the Indian State Tamil Nadu. Nearby towns include Puliangudi (14 km), Surandai (12 km), Sankarankoil (16 km), Tenkasi (30 km), Kadayanallur (15 km)

Arianayagipuram is also known as "Flower City", due to varieties of flowers cultivated around the village.

== Education ==
Hindu Nadar Uravin Murai Committee Higher Secondary School is one of the oldest school in the district and the students come to study from nearer villages Arunachalapuram, Periasamypuram, Meenakshipuram, Pambakovilshandhy, Paraikulam and Sankanapperi.

== Transport ==
It is in the bus route from Puliangudi to Tirunelveli via Surandai. It has good road and rail connectivity to nearby major towns like Tenkasi, Rajapalyam, Sankaran Kovil, Tirunelveli, and Madurai.

The nearest railway station is at Tirunelveli which is serviced by passenger and express & Superfast trains running between Kanyakumari, Nagerkoil, Madurai, Chennai, Nagpur & New Delhi. Other major stations nearby are Sankaran Kovil and Kadayanallur.

== Distance to other cities ==
Arianayagipuram-to-Sankarankovil =16 km

Arianayagipuram-to-Kadayanallur =15 km

Arianayagipuram-to-Tenkasi =35 km

Arianayagipuram-to-Tirunelveli =24 km

Arianayagipuram-to-Surandai =20 km
