= Ramasundara Karunalaya Pandian =

Indian politician

Ramasundara Karunalaya Pandian was an Indian politician and former Member of the Legislative Assembly. He was elected to the Tamil Nadu Legislative Assembly as an Independent candidate from Sankarankoil constituency in 1952 election. He was later elected as the first Chairman of the Vasudevanallur Panchayat Union. He was born in Puliyangudi. He married Guruvammal Nachiyar, daughter of Shanmuga Sundara Thevar, the 4th Lord of Thevar estate of Puliyangudi.
