= Gangaikondan Assembly constituency =

State assembly constituency

Coordinates: 8.86°N 77.78°E

Gangaikondan
- Former constituency for the Tamil Nadu Legislative Assembly

Constituency details
- Country: India
- Region: South India
- State: Tamil Nadu
- District: Tirunelveli
- Established: 1962
- Abolished: 1971
- Reservation: None

Gangaikondan was a state assembly constituency in Tamil Nadu. It was in existence from the 1962 to 1971 state elections.

== Members of the Legislative Assembly ==
Year	Winner	Party
1962	R. S. Arumugam	Indian National Congress
1967	A. Karuppiah	Dravida Munnetra Kazhagam
1971	A. Karuppiah	Dravida Munnetra Kazhagam

== Election results ==
=== 1971 ===
1971 Tamil Nadu Legislative Assembly election: Gangaikondan
Party	Candidate	Votes	%	±%
DMK	A. Karuppiah	32,963	58.83%	−0.76%
INC	S. Koil Pillai	18,207	32.49%	−4.46%
Independent	M. P. Karunanithi	3,221	5.75%	
Independent	P. Padmanabhan	1,641	2.93%	
Margin of victory		14,756	26.33%	3.69%
Turnout		56,032	63.88%	−4.19%
Registered electors		95,985		
DMK hold		Swing	-0.76%	

=== 1967 ===
1967 Madras Legislative Assembly election: Gangaikondan
Party	Candidate	Votes	%	±%
DMK	A. Karuppiah	34,797	59.59%	39.84%
INC	M. Chellappa	21,576	36.95%	2.03%
Independent	P. Parasesi	1,029	1.76%	
Independent	N. Raman	602	1.03%	
Independent	M. Rmaswamy	389	0.67%	
Margin of victory		13,221	22.64%	15.14%
Turnout		58,393	68.07%	9.40%
Registered electors		91,350		
DMK gain from INC		Swing	24.67%	

=== 1962 ===
1962 Madras Legislative Assembly election: Gangaikondan
Party	Candidate	Votes	%	±%
INC	R. S. Arumugam	17,548	34.92%	
Independent	S. Chelliah	13,780	27.42%	
DMK	T. K. Velu	9,926	19.75%	
SWA	N. Raman	6,556	13.04%	
Independent	M. Chidambaranathan	1,105	2.20%	
Independent	M. Ponnuchamy	511	1.02%	
Independent	P. Arunachalam Kudumbar	449	0.89%	
Independent	P. Baliah	382	0.76%	
Margin of victory		3,768	7.50%	
Turnout		50,257	58.67%	
Registered electors		89,573		
INC win (new seat)				
