= S. M. Abdul Majid =

Indian politician

S. M. Abdul Majid Sahib is an Indian politician and former Member of the Legislative Assembly. He was elected to the Tamil Nadu legislative assembly as an Indian National Congress candidate from Sankaranayanarkoil constituency in 1962 election. He also served as minister for local administration in Kamaraj cabinet between 1962 and 1963.
