= P. Sathyabama =

Indian politician (born 1975)

Member of the Tamil Nadu Legislative Assembly
- Incumbent
- Assumed office 11 May 2026
- Preceded by: N. Kayalvizhi
- Constituency: Dharapuram

Personal details
- Party: Tamilaga Vettri Kazhagam (since 25 May 2026)
- Other political affiliations: All India Anna Dravida Munnetra Kazhagam (until 25 May 2026)

P. Sathyabama (born 1975) is an Indian politician from Tamil Nadu. She is a member of the Tamil Nadu Legislative Assembly from Dharapuram Assembly constituency, which is reserved for Scheduled Castes in Tiruppur district, representing All India Anna Dravida Munnetra Kazhagam.

She became an MLA for the first time winning the 2026 Tamil Nadu Legislative Assembly election from Dharapuram seat on AIADMK ticket. She polled 81,100 votes and defeated her nearest rival, Indirani. T. of the Dravida Munnetra Kazhagam, by a margin of 16,727 votes.
