= Dhanush M. Kumar =

Member of the 17th Lok Sabha

Member of the India Parliament for Tenkasi
- In office 23 May 2019 – 4 June 2024
- Preceded by: M. Vasanthi
- Succeeded by: Rani Srikumar
- Constituency: Tenkasi

Personal details
- Born: Rajapalayam
- Party: Dravida Munnetra Kazhagam

Dhanush M. Kumar is an Indian politician and member of the 17th Lok Sabha, representing Tenkasi constituency, Tamil Nadu. He is a member of the Dravida Munnetra Kazhagam.
