= Dhilipan Jaishankar =

Indian politician

Member of the Tamil Nadu Legislative Assembly
- Incumbent
- Assumed office 11 May 2026
- Preceded by: E. Raja
- Constituency: Sankarankovil

Personal details
- Party: All India Anna Dravida Munnetra Kazhagam
- Profession: Politician

Dhilipan Jaishankar is an Indian politician from Tamil Nadu. He is a member of the Tamil Nadu Legislative Assembly from Sankarankovil representing the All India Anna Dravida Munnetra Kazhagam.

== Political career ==
Jaishankar won the Sankarankovil seat in the 2026 Tamil Nadu Legislative Assembly election as a candidate of the All India Anna Dravida Munnetra Kazhagam. He received 64,865 votes and defeated C. Ramarajan of Tamilaga Vettri Kazhagam by a margin of 6,489 votes.
