= R. S. Arumugam =

Indian politician

Member of the Madras State Assembly
- In office 1962–1967
- Preceded by: S. Chelliah
- Constituency: Gangaikondan

Member of the Madras State Assembly
- In office 1984–1989
- Preceded by: M. Appadurai
- Constituency: Ottapidaram

Personal details
- Party: Indian National Congress

R. S. Arumugam was an Indian politician.

== Member of Legislative Assembly ==
He was a Member of the Legislative Assembly. He was elected to the Tamil Nadu Legislative Assembly as an Indian National Congress candidate from Gangaikondan constituency in 1962 election.

He was elected to the Tamil Nadu Legislative Assembly as an Indian National Congress candidate from Ottapidaram constituency in 1984 election.

== Member of Parliament ==
He was elected to 4th Lok Sabha from Tenkasi Lok Sabha constituency as an Indian National Congress candidate in 1967 Lok Sabha election. He lost the 1971 Lok Sabha election to A. M. Chellachami in the same constituency.

== Elections contested ==
=== Tamilnadu Legislative Assembly Election ===
Election	Constituency	Party	Result	Vote %	Opposition Candidate	Opposition Party	Opposition vote %
