= S. Thangavelu =

Indian politician

- ச தங்கவேலு

Member of Parliament, Rajya Sabha
- In office 2010–2016
- Constituency: Tamil Nadu

Municipality Chairman
- In office 1996–2006
- Constituency: Sankarankoil Municipality

Member of the Legislative Assembly
- In office 1989–1991
- Constituency: Sankarankoil

Minister of Textiles and Urban Development
- In office 1989-1991
- Chief Minister: Karunanidhi
- Constituency: Sankarankoil

Municipality Deputy Chairman
- In office 1989–1991
- Constituency: Sankarankoil Municipality

Personal details
- Born: 15 April 1954 Sankarankoil, Tirunelveli district, Madras State (now Tenkasi district, Tamil Nadu, India)
- Party: Dravida Munnetra Kazhagam (1980-2011)
- Education: St. Xavier's College, Tamil Nadu Agriculture And Research Institute

Sangaramoorthy Thangavelu (born April 15, 1954) is an Indian politician and the former Member of Parliament in the Rajya Sabha. He was elected from Tamil Nadu representing the Dravida Munnetra Kazhagam Party. He had also served as a cabinet minister to Chief Minister Dr. M. Karunanidhi in 1989-1991 term.

== Early life and education ==
S.Thangavelu was born in 1954 to U. Sangaramoorthy and S. Kaliammal at Sankarankovil in the Tirunelveli District. He had his primary school studies at Gandhi Nagar Municipality School and secondary school studies at Gomathiambal Government Boys High School in Sankarankovil. He went to St. Xavier's College in Palayamkottai for his Pre-University College studies. He studied Bachelor of Science in Agriculture at the reputed Tamil Nadu Agriculture And Research Institute in Madurai.

== Career ==
After graduation, he joined the State Agricultural Department as Agricultural Officer and deputed to Karamikudi of Pudukottai district.

== Political career ==
In 1984, he resigned from his job to take part in active politics. He contested his first state assembly election in 1984 in Sankarankovil constituency of Tirunelveli District and lost the election by a narrow margin. On March 3, 1986, he was elected as vice-chairman of Sankarankovil municipality and served till March 3, 1991. In 1989 he contested in the Tamil Nadu state assembly election from Sankarankovil (State Assembly Constituency) and won with a huge margin. Honorable chief Minister of Tamil Nadu Dr. M. Karunanidhi appointed him in his cabinet as Minister for the Hand Loom Department with an additional charge of Minister for Urban Development Department till 1991. During his ministerial years, the Slum Clearance Board, Town Planning Board and the Rent Control Board were under his control. He also served as a chairman of Metropolitan Manila Development Authority (MMDA). On October 25, 1996, he was elected as Sankarankovil Municipality Chairman through a public election and served till October 24, 2001. He was again elected as Sankarankovil Municipality Chairman in 2001 and served till April 14, 2006. On June 10, 2010, he was elected as Raiya Sabha MP (Member Of Parliament) from Tamil Nadu through his party Dravida Munnetra Kazhagam (DMK). He took his oath on July 26, 2010, in the assembly's first session.

== Elections contested ==
=== Tamilnadu Legislative Assembly Elections ===
Elections	Constituency	Party	Result	Vote percentage	Opposition Candidate	Opposition Party	Opposition vote percentage
1984 Tamil Nadu Legislative Assembly election	Sankarankoil	DMK	Lost	40.52	S. Sankaralingam	AIADMK	54.45
1989 Tamil Nadu Legislative Assembly election	Sankarankoil	DMK	Won	43.99	K. Marutha Karuppan	AIADMK	23.36
1991 Tamil Nadu Legislative Assembly election	Sankarankoil	DMK	Lost	36.56	V. Gopalakrishnan	AIADMK	61.88
1996 Tamil Nadu Legislative Assembly election	Sankarankoil	MDMK	Lost	27.64	C. Karuppasamy	AIADMK	33.94
2001 Tamil Nadu Legislative Assembly election	Sankarankoil	DMK	Lost	36.79	C. Karuppasamy	AIADMK	40.33

=== Rajya Sabha Elections Contested ===
Year	Election	Party	PC Name	Result
2010	Rajya Sabha	Dravida Munnetra Kazhagam	Tamil Nadu	Won

== Positions held ==
- Tirunelveli West District DMK Representative
- DMK Youth Wing Deputy Secretary
- DMK Tamilnadu State Adi Dravidar Welfare Member
- DMK Executive Council Member
- 1989–1991 : was Elected to Tamilnadu State Legislative Assembly (Ninth) for the 1st time
- 1989–1991 : was appointed as the Minister for Textiles and Urban Development in the Cabinet
- 1989–1991 : was appointed as the Chairman of MMDA
- 1996–2001 : was Elected as Chairman of Sankarankoil Municipality for the 1st time
- 2001–2006 : was Elected as Chairman of Sankarankoil Municipality for the 2nd time
- 2010–2016 : was nominated as Member of Parliament, Rajya Sabha
