= Tenkasi Lok Sabha constituency =

Parliamentary constituency in Tamil Nadu, India

Coordinates: 9.0°N 77.3°E

Tenkasi
- Lok Sabha constituency
- Interactive map of Tenkasi Loksabha constituency, post-2008 delimitation

Constituency details
- Country: India
- Region: South India
- State: Tamil Nadu
- Assembly constituencies: Rajapalayam; Srivilliputhur; Sankarankovil; Vasudevanallur; Kadayanallur; Tenkasi
- Established: 1957
- Total electors: 15,03,898
- Reservation: SC

Member of Parliament
- 18th Lok Sabha
- Incumbent Rani Srikumar
- Party: DMK
- Alliance: None
- Elected year: 2024

Tenkasi Lok Sabha constituency is one of the 39 Lok Sabha (parliamentary) constituencies in Tamil Nadu, a state in southern India. It is reserved for SC(Scheduled Caste). Its Parliamentary Constituency number is 37.

== Assembly segments ==
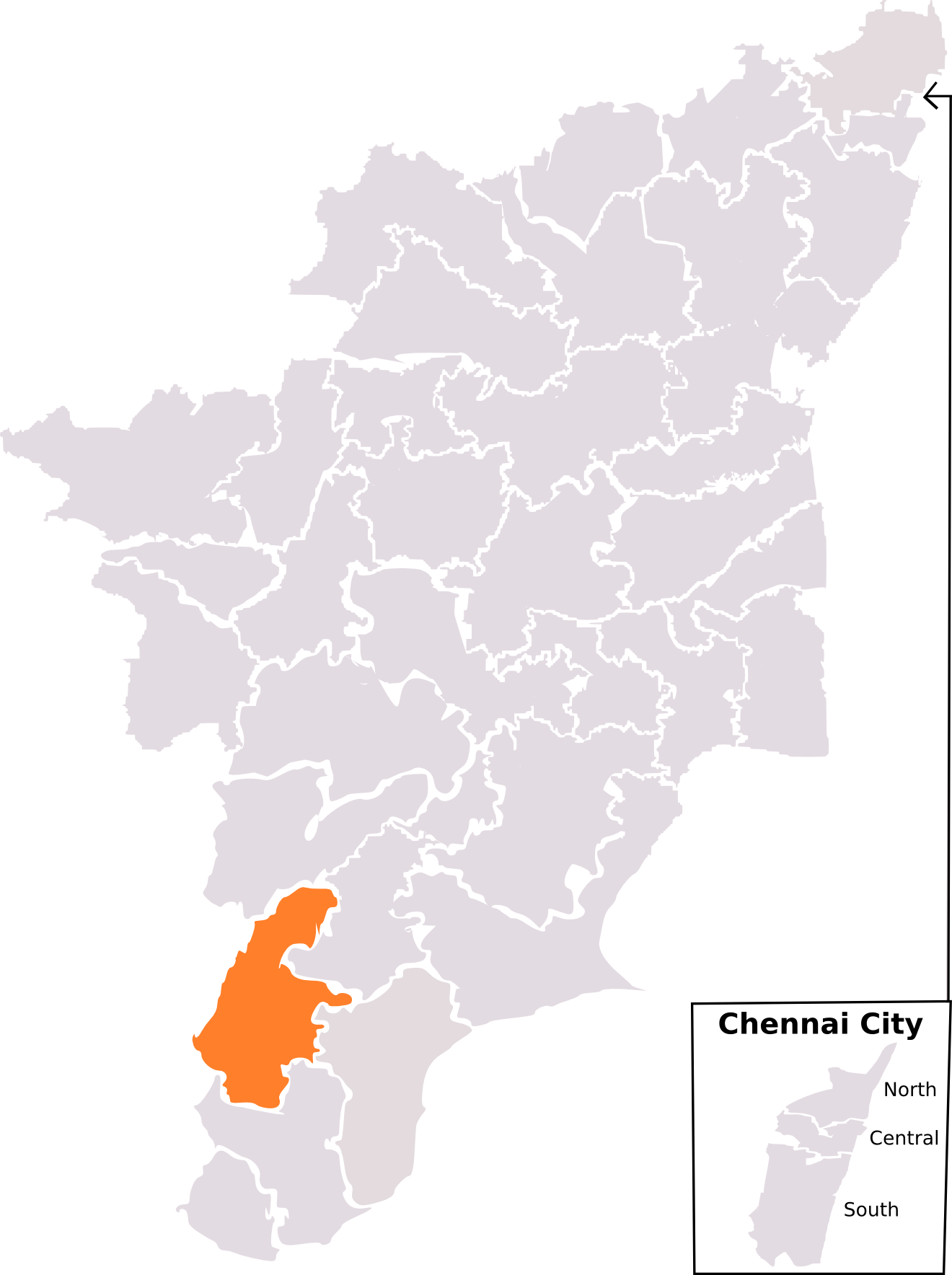
Tenkasi constituency as laid out by 2008 Delimitation

Tenkasi Lok Sabha constituency is composed of the following assembly segments:

Constituency number	Name	Reserved for (SC/ST/None)	District	Party	2024 Lead
203	Rajapalayam	None	Virudhunagar	TVK	DMK
204	Srivilliputhur	SC	Virudhunagar	TVK	DMK
219	Sankarankoil	SC	Tenkasi	AIADMK	DMK
220	Vasudevanallur	SC	Tenkasi	DMK	DMK
221	Kadayanallur	None	Tenkasi	DMK	DMK
222	Tenkasi	None	Tenkasi	DMK	DMK

=== Before 2009 ===
1. Sankarankovil (SC)
2. Vasudevanallur (SC)
3. Kadaiyanallur
4. Tenkasi
5. Alangulam (moved to Tirunelveli Constituency)
6. Ambasamuthiram (moved to Tirunelveli Constituency)

== Members of Parliament ==
Year	Winner	Party
1957	M. Sankarapandian	Indian National Congress
1962	M. P. Swamy	Indian National Congress
1967	R. S. Arumugam	Indian National Congress
1971	A. M. Chellachami	Indian National Congress
1977	M. Arunachalam	Indian National Congress
1980	M. Arunachalam	Indian National Congress
1984	M. Arunachalam	Indian National Congress
1989	M. Arunachalam	Indian National Congress
1991	M. Arunachalam	Indian National Congress
1996	M. Arunachalam	Tamil Maanila Congress
1998	S. Murugesan	All India Anna Dravida Munnetra Kazhagam
1999	S. Murugesan	All India Anna Dravida Munnetra Kazhagam
2004	M. Appadurai	Communist Party of India
2009	P. Lingam	Communist Party of India
2014	M. Vasanthi	All India Anna Dravida Munnetra Kazhagam
2019	Dhanush M. Kumar	Dravida Munnetra Kazhagam
2024	Rani Srikumar	Dravida Munnetra Kazhagam

== Election results ==
Vote share of Winning candidates
2024	40.97%
2019	45.11%
2014	42.31%
2009	37.80%
2004	48.87%
1999	35.88%
1998	41.84%
1996	44.98%
1991	63.56%
1989	62.50%
1984	68.09%
1980	62.42%
1977	69.23%
1971	55.48%
1967	41.52%
1962	51.15%
1957	50.97%

=== General Elections 2024 ===
2024 Indian general election: Tenkasi
Party	Candidate	Votes	%	±%
DMK	Dr. Rani Srikumar	425,679	40.97	
AIADMK	K. Krishnasamy	2,29,480	22.08	
BJP	B. John Pandian	2,08,825	20.10	
NOTA	None of the above	17,165	1.65	
Margin of victory		1,96,199	18.89	−
Turnout			67.65	−3.78
DMK hold		Swing	2.80	

=== General Elections 2019 ===
2019 Indian general election: Tenkasi
Party	Candidate	Votes	%	±%
DMK	Dhanush M. Kumar	476,156	45.11	▲45.11
AIADMK	Dr. K. Krishnasamy	3,55,389	33.67	▼8.65
AMMK	S. Ponnuthai	92,116	8.73	New
MNM	K. Muneshwaran	24,023	2.28	New
NOTA	None of the above	14,056	1.33	▼0.11
Margin of victory		1,20,767	11.44	−4.68
Turnout		10,55,595	71.43	−1.87
Registered electors		14,92,317		7.98
DMK gain from AIADMK		Swing	2.80	

=== General Elections 2014 ===
2014 Indian general election: Tenkasi
Party	Candidate	Votes	%	±%
AIADMK	M. Vasanthi	424,586	42.31	▲42.31
PT	Dr. K. Krishnasamy	2,62,812	26.19	▲10.5
MDMK	Dr. T. Sadhan Tirumalaikumar	1,90,233	18.96	▲18.96
INC	Dr. K. Jayakumar	58,963	5.88	▼27.26
CPI	P. Lingam	23,528	2.34	▼35.45
NOTA	None of the above	14,492	1.44	
Independent	A. Krishnasamy	12,115	1.21	
TNMK	K. Gunasekaran	8,022	0.80	New
Margin of victory		1,61,774	16.12	11.46
Turnout		10,03,446	73.76	2.66
Registered electors		13,82,081		29.94
AIADMK gain from CPI		Swing	4.52	

=== General Elections 2009 ===
2009 Indian general election: Tenkasi
Party	Candidate	Votes	%	±%
CPI	P. Lingam	281,174	37.80	▼11.07
INC	G. Vellaipandi	2,46,497	33.14	▲33.14
PT	Dr. K. Krishnasamy	1,16,685	15.69	▲1.49
DMDK	K. Inbaraj	75,741	10.18	New
BSP	K. Krishnan	6,948	0.93	▲0.26
Independent	R. Lakshmanan	6,633	0.89	
Margin of victory		34,677	4.66	−12.49
Turnout		7,43,895	70.18	4.29
Registered electors		10,63,614		−1.94
CPI hold		Swing	-11.07	

=== General Elections 2004 ===
2004 Indian general election: Tenkasi
Party	Candidate	Votes	%	±%
CPI	M. Appadurai	348,000	48.87	▲48.87
AIADMK	S. Murugesan	2,25,824	31.71	▼4.17
JD(U)	Dr. K. Krishnasamy	1,01,122	14.20	▼13.73
Independent	M. Vadivel Kumar	14,441	2.03	
Independent	R. Lakshmanan	5,599	0.79	
BSP	P. Luke Jayakumar	4,759	0.67	New
Margin of victory		1,22,176	17.16	17.02
Turnout		7,12,150	65.68	0.78
Registered electors		10,84,708		3.89
CPI gain from AIADMK		Swing	12.99	

=== General Elections 1999 ===
1999 Indian general election: Tenkasi
Party	Candidate	Votes	%	±%
AIADMK	S. Murugesan	239,241	35.88	▼5.96
BJP	S. Arumugam	2,38,354	35.74	▲35.74
PT	Dr. K. Krishnasamy	1,86,220	27.93	▲8.78
Margin of victory		887	0.13	−14.94
Turnout		6,66,826	64.87	−5.07
Registered electors		10,44,090		2.92
AIADMK hold		Swing	-9.11	

=== General Elections 1998 ===
1998 Indian general election: Tenkasi
Party	Candidate	Votes	%	±%
AIADMK	S. Murugesan	270,053	41.84	New
TMC(M)	M. Arunachalam	1,72,786	26.77	▼18.21
PT	Dr. K. Krishnasamy	1,23,592	19.15	New
INC	V. Selvaraj	77,285	11.97	▼18.17
Margin of victory		97,267	15.07	0.22
Turnout		6,45,491	65.29	−4.66
Registered electors		10,14,494		4.26
AIADMK gain from TMC(M)		Swing	-3.15	

=== General Elections 1996 ===
1996 Indian general election: Tenkasi
Party	Candidate	Votes	%	±%
TMC(M)	M. Arunachalam	290,663	44.98	New
INC	V. Selvaraj	1,94,737	30.14	▼33.42
CPI(M)	P. Jeyaraj	82,615		▲12.79
BJP	S. Arumugam	52,120	8.07	New
PMK	T. Amirtharaj	16,328	2.53	▲0.62
Margin of victory		95,926	14.85	−15.47
Turnout		6,46,145	69.94	3.08
Registered electors		9,73,084		5.01
TMC(M) gain from INC		Swing	-18.58	

=== General Elections 1991 ===
1991 Indian general election: Tenkasi
Party	Candidate	Votes	%	±%
INC	M. Arunachalam	381,721	63.56	▲1.06
DMK	Dr. T. Sadhan Tirumalaikumar	1,99,635	33.24	New
PMK	E. Nambirajan	11,479	1.91	New
THMM	Saker	3,190	0.53	▼0.06
Margin of victory		1,82,086	30.32	2.86
Turnout		6,00,569	66.87	−1.58
Registered electors		9,26,698		−0.70
INC hold		Swing	1.06	

=== General Elections 1989 ===
1989 Indian general election: Tenkasi
Party	Candidate	Votes	%	±%
INC	M. Arunachalam	393,075	62.50	▼5.59
CPI(M)	R. Krishnan	2,20,368	35.04	▲3.13
Independent	S. Muthiah	4,320	0.69	
THMM	S. Manickaraj	3,680	0.59	New
Margin of victory		1,72,707	27.46	−8.72
Turnout		6,28,887	68.45	−7.22
Registered electors		9,33,214		26.81
INC hold		Swing	-5.59	

=== General Elections 1984 ===
1984 Indian general election: Tenkasi
Party	Candidate	Votes	%	±%
INC	M. Arunachalam	360,517	68.09	▲5.67
CPI(M)	R. Krishnan	1,68,950	31.91	▲31.91
Margin of victory		1,91,567	36.18	11.35
Turnout		5,29,467	75.67	9.76
Registered electors		7,35,912		8.32
INC gain from INC(I)		Swing	5.67	

=== General Elections 1980 ===
1980 Indian general election: Tenkasi
Party	Candidate	Votes	%	±%
INC(I)	M. Arunachalam	272,260	62.42	▼6.81
JP	S. Rajagopalan	1,63,944	37.58	New
Margin of victory		1,08,316	24.83	−17.58
Turnout		4,36,204	65.92	−1.03
Registered electors		6,79,386		0.83
INC(I) gain from INC		Swing	-6.82	

=== General Elections 1977 ===
1977 Indian general election: Tenkasi
Party	Candidate	Votes	%	±%
INC	M. Arunachalam	305,069	69.23	▲13.75
INC(O)	S. Rajagopalan	1,18,193	26.82	▼11.53
Independent	K. Maruthan	13,124	2.98	
Independent	K. Shenthivelu	4,269	0.97	
Margin of victory		1,86,876	42.41	25.28
Turnout		4,40,655	66.94	−5.98
Registered electors		6,73,825		17.97
INC hold		Swing	13.75	

=== General Elections 1971 ===
1971 Indian general election: Tenkasi
Party	Candidate	Votes	%	±%
INC	A. M. C. Nellachami	223,182	55.48	▲13.96
INC(O)	R. S. Arumugam	1,54,272	38.35	New
Independent	K. Subbiah	24,822	6.17	
Margin of victory		68,910	17.13	15.70
Turnout		4,02,276	72.92	−4.58
Registered electors		5,71,197		6.59
INC hold		Swing	13.96	

=== General Elections 1967 ===
1967 Indian general election: Tenkasi
Party	Candidate	Votes	%	±%
INC	R. S. Arumugam	166,737	41.52	▼9.63
SWA	Velu	1,60,991	40.09	▲20.26
CPI	P. Muthumanickam	37,190	9.26	▼19.76
Independent	V. K. Madasamy	24,537	6.11	
PSP	P. K. Swamy	12,162	3.03	New
Margin of victory		5,746	1.43	−20.69
Turnout		4,01,617	77.50	4.96
Registered electors		5,35,903		17.00
INC hold		Swing	-9.63	

=== General Elections 1962 ===
1962 Indian general election: Tenkasi
Party	Candidate	Votes	%	±%
INC	M. P. Swamy	165,169	51.15	▲0.17
CPI	S. A. Muruganandam	93,729	29.02	▼20.00
SWA	Hameed	64,036	19.83	New
Margin of victory		71,440	22.12	20.18
Turnout		3,22,934	72.55	16.60
Registered electors		4,58,052		3.81
INC hold		Swing	0.17	

=== General Elections 1957 ===
1957 Indian general election: Tenkasi
Party	Candidate	Votes	%	±%
INC	M. Sankarapandian	125,821	50.97	New
CPI	N. Shanmugam	1,21,021	49.03	New
Margin of victory		4,800	1.94	
Turnout		2,46,842	55.94	
Registered electors		4,41,227		
INC win (new seat)				

== See also ==
- Tenkasi
- List of constituencies of the Lok Sabha
