= Vasudevanallur Assembly constituency =

One of the 234 State Legislative Assembly Constituencies in Tamil Nadu, in India

Coordinates: 9.24°N 77.41°E

Vasudevanallur
- Constituency No. 220 for the Tamil Nadu Legislative Assembly

Constituency details
- Country: India
- Region: South India
- State: Tamil Nadu
- District: Tenkasi
- Lok Sabha constituency: Tenkasi
- Established: 1967
- Total electors: 228,557
- Reservation: SC

Member of Legislative Assembly
- 17th Tamil Nadu Legislative Assembly
- Incumbent E. Raja
- Party: DMK
- Alliance: SPA
- Elected year: 2026

Vasudevanallur is a legislative assembly constituency in Tenkasi district in the Indian state of Tamil Nadu. It is reserved for members of the Scheduled Castes. Elections and winners in the constituency are listed below. It is a part of Tenkasi Lok Sabha constituency. It is one of the 234 State Legislative Assembly Constituencies in Tamil Nadu, in India.

== Demographics ==
Gender demographics of Vasudevanallur Assembly constituency as of 01.05.2021, taken ahead of the state general elections in 2021.

Year	Female	Male	Transgender	Total
2021	1,18,227	1,22,101	39	2,40,367

== Members of Legislative Assembly ==
Year	Member	Political party
Madras State
1967	A. Velladurai	Dravida Munnetra Kazhagam
Tamil Nadu
1971	A. Velladurai	Dravida Munnetra Kazhagam
1977	R. Krishnan	Communist Party of India (Marxist)
1980	R. Krishnan	Communist Party of India (Marxist)
1984	R. Eswaran	Indian National Congress
1989	R. Eswaran	Indian National Congress
1991	R. Eswaran	Indian National Congress
1996	R. Eswaran	Tamil Maanila Congress (Moopanar)
2001	R. Eswaran	Tamil Maanila Congress (Moopanar)
2006	T. Sadhan Tirumalaikumar	Marumalarchi Dravida Munnetra Kazhagam
2011	S. Duraiappa	All India Anna Dravida Munnetra Kazhagam
2016	A. Manoharan	All India Anna Dravida Munnetra Kazhagam
2021	T. Sadhan Tirumalaikumar (Note: MDMK candidate contested and won on DMK ticket)	Dravida Munnetra Kazhagam
2026	E. Raja	Dravida Munnetra Kazhagam

== Election results ==
Vote share of winning candidates
2026	33.22%
2021	39.08%
2016	45.06%
2011	56.77%
2006	40.27%
2001	47.05%
1996	32.50%
1991	58.28%
1989	32.15%
1984	62.34%
1980	50.51%
1977	33.25%
1971	56.96%
1967	50.24%

=== 2026 ===
2026 Tamil Nadu Legislative Assembly election: Vasudevanallur
Party	Candidate	Votes	%	±%
DMK	E. Raja	63,045	33.22	▼6.35
BJP	Ananthan Ayyasamy	56,462	29.75	
TVK	R. Amutharani	45,862	24.16	New
PT	K. Paulraj	4,119	2.17	
AIPTMMK	A. Ponnuthai	2,249	1.18	
Independent	A. Palanikumar	1,020	0.54	
Independent	Senthilkumar	739	0.39	
NOTA	NOTA	637	0.34	
Margin of victory		6,583		
Turnout		1,89,795		
Rejected ballots				
Registered electors				
DMK gain from MDMK		Swing		

=== 2021 ===
2021 Tamil Nadu Legislative Assembly election: Vasudevanallur
Party	Candidate	Votes	%	±%
MDMK	Dr. T. Sadhan Tirumalaikumar	68,730	39.57	New
AIADMK	A. Manoharan	66,363	38.20	−6.86
AMMK	S. Thangaraj	13,376	7.70	New
PT	V. Petchiammal	3,651	2.10	New
NOTA	NOTA	2,171	1.25	−0.43
MNM	M. Chinnasamy	2,139	1.23	New
Margin of victory		2,367	1.36	−10.07
Turnout		173,710	72.05	−2.09
Rejected ballots		8	0.00	
Registered electors		241,109		
MDMK gain from AIADMK		Swing	-5.50	

=== 2016 ===
2016 Tamil Nadu Legislative Assembly election: Vasudevanallur
Party	Candidate	Votes	%	±%
AIADMK	A. Manoharan	73,904	45.06	−11.71
PT	S. Anbalagan	55,146	33.62	New
CPI	R. Samuthirakani	13,735	8.37	New
BJP	N. Rajkumar	7,121	4.34	+2.69
Independent	M. Arunachalam	3,865	2.36	New
NOTA	NOTA	2,763	1.68	New
Independent	M. Samy	1,343	0.82	New
PMK	K. Kasipandiyan	1,198	0.73	New
Margin of victory		18,758	11.44	−8.34
Turnout		164,007	74.14	−2.35
Registered electors		221,225		
AIADMK hold		Swing	-11.71	

=== 2011 ===
2011 Tamil Nadu Legislative Assembly election: Vasudevanallur
Party	Candidate	Votes	%	±%
AIADMK	Dr. S. Duraiappa	80,633	56.77	New
INC	S. Ganesan	52,543	37.00	New
BJP	N. Rajkumar	2,340	1.65	−0.62
Independent	M. Ramalingam	2,291	1.61	New
Independent	V. Poosaipandi	1,862	1.31	New
BSP	S. Pandi	1,130	0.80	−11.71
Independent	S. Pitchaikani	778	0.55	New
Margin of victory		28,090	19.78	13.83
Turnout		142,026	76.49	6.09
Registered electors		185,683		
AIADMK gain from MDMK		Swing	16.50	

=== 2006 ===
2006 Tamil Nadu Legislative Assembly election: Vasudevanallur
Party	Candidate	Votes	%	±%
MDMK	Dr. T. Sadhan Tirumalaikumar	45,790	40.27	+26.81
CPI(M)	R. Krishnan	39,031	34.33	New
PT	D. Anandan	14,220	12.51	New
DMDK	S. Pitchai	6,390	5.62	New
AIFB	K. Babu	4,332	3.81	New
BJP	C. Selvakani	2,579	2.27	New
Independent	K. Chandra Sekaran	1,363	1.20	New
Margin of victory		6,759	5.94	−5.37
Turnout		113,705	70.40	9.44
Registered electors		161,517		
MDMK gain from TMC(M)		Swing	-6.77	

=== 2001 ===
2001 Tamil Nadu Legislative Assembly election: Vasudevanallur
Party	Candidate	Votes	%	±%
TMC(M)	R. Eswaran	48,019	47.05	New
PT	S. Thangapandian	36,467	35.73	New
MDMK	G. Ganesh Kumar	13,742	13.46	New
Independent	S. Durai Raj	2,775	2.72	New
Independent	T. Samuthirapandian	1,066	1.04	New
Margin of victory		11,552	11.32	10.71
Turnout		102,069	60.96	−8.40
Registered electors		167,586		
TMC(M) hold		Swing	14.55	

=== 1996 ===
1996 Tamil Nadu Legislative Assembly election: Vasudevanallur
Party	Candidate	Votes	%	±%
TMC(M)	R. Eswaran	32,693	32.50	New
INC	P. Suresh Babu	32,077	31.89	−26.39
CPI(M)	R. Krishnan	20,302	20.18	−16.45
Independent	V. Gopalakrishnan	8,950	8.90	New
BJP	A. Singarayan	2,843	2.83	New
PMK	S. Murugan	1,705	1.69	New
Margin of victory		616	0.61	−21.04
Turnout		100,597	69.36	4.01
Registered electors		153,308		
TMC(M) gain from INC		Swing	-25.78	

=== 1991 ===
1991 Tamil Nadu Legislative Assembly election: Vasudevanallur
Party	Candidate	Votes	%	±%
INC	R. Eswaran	54,688	58.28	+26.13
CPI(M)	S. Madasamy	34,374	36.63	+4.91
IUML	K. Paulraj	3,567	3.80	New
THMM	R. Krishnan	572	0.61	New
Margin of victory		20,314	21.65	21.22
Turnout		93,835	65.35	−6.74
Registered electors		149,712		
INC hold		Swing	26.13	

=== 1989 ===
1989 Tamil Nadu Legislative Assembly election: Vasudevanallur
Party	Candidate	Votes	%	±%
INC	R. Eswaran	30,805	32.15	−30.19
CPI(M)	R. Krishnan	30,394	31.72	−2.83
CPI	S. Kanagasabai	17,325	18.08	New
AIADMK	T. Rengasay	17,043	17.79	New
Margin of victory		411	0.43	−27.37
Turnout		95,816	72.09	1.67
Registered electors		135,907		
INC hold		Swing	-30.19	

=== 1984 ===
1984 Tamil Nadu Legislative Assembly election: Vasudevanallur
Party	Candidate	Votes	%	±%
INC	R. Eswaran	50,303	62.34	+16.69
CPI(M)	M. S. Periasamy	27,875	34.55	−15.97
Independent	S. Muthiah	865	1.07	New
Independent	V. Vijayan	595	0.74	New
Independent	K. Maruthan	588	0.73	New
Independent	V. Sankarapandian	460	0.57	New
Margin of victory		22,428	27.80	22.94
Turnout		80,686	70.41	13.35
Registered electors		120,134		
INC gain from CPI(M)		Swing	11.83	

=== 1980 ===
1980 Tamil Nadu Legislative Assembly election: Vasudevanallur
Party	Candidate	Votes	%	±%
CPI(M)	R. Krishnan	33,107	50.51	+17.26
INC	R. Eswaran	29,921	45.65	New
JP	Ayyadurai Alias Anantharaj	2,513	3.83	New
Margin of victory		3,186	4.86	−1.83
Turnout		65,541	57.06	6.27
Registered electors		116,791		
CPI(M) hold		Swing	17.26	

=== 1977 ===
1977 Tamil Nadu Legislative Assembly election: Vasudevanallur
Party	Candidate	Votes	%	±%
CPI(M)	R. Krishnan	20,092	33.25	New
CPI	I. Muthuraj	16,048	26.56	New
JP	Ayyadurai Alias Anantharaj	10,826	17.92	New
DMK	M. Duraisamy	10,330	17.10	−39.86
Independent	S. Kattapan	2,472	4.09	New
Independent	K. Maruthan	650	1.08	New
Margin of victory		4,044	6.69	−7.22
Turnout		60,418	50.79	−14.90
Registered electors		121,099		
CPI(M) gain from DMK		Swing	-23.70	

=== 1971 ===
1971 Tamil Nadu Legislative Assembly election: Vasudevanallur
Party	Candidate	Votes	%	±%
DMK	A. Velladurai	35,954	56.96	+6.72
INC	A. Gopa Thevar	27,169	43.04	+3.15
Margin of victory		8,785	13.92	3.56
Turnout		63,123	65.69	−9.79
Registered electors		99,614		
DMK hold		Swing	6.72	

=== 1967 ===
1967 Madras Legislative Assembly election: Vasudevanallur
Party	Candidate	Votes	%	±%
DMK	A. Velladurai	33,865	50.24	New
INC	M. P. Swamy	26,885	39.89	New
CPI	K. C. Thevar	6,653	9.87	New
Margin of victory		6,980	10.36	
Turnout		67,403	75.48	
Registered electors		92,896		
DMK win (new seat)				
