= E. Raja =

Indian politician

Member of Tamil Nadu Legislative Assembly
- Incumbent
- Assumed office 11 May 2026
- Preceded by: Dr. T. Sadhan Tirumalaikumar
- Constituency: Vasudevanallur
- In office 12 May 2021 – 4 May 2026
- Preceded by: V. M. Rajalakshmi
- Succeeded by: Dr. Dhilipan Jaishankar
- Constituency: Sankarankoil

Personal details
- Born: Raja Eswaran; 19 June 1985 (age 41) Chintamani Tenkasi district, Tamil Nadu India
- Party: Dravida Munnetra Kazhagam
- Parent: Eswaran
- Occupation: Politician, lawyer,Weightlifter
- Website: E. Raja

Eswaran Raja is an Indian politician, lawyer, and international weightlifter from Tamil Nadu. He is a member of the Tamil Nadu Legislative Assembly from Vasudevanallur representing the Dravida Munnetra Kazhagam.

== Political career ==
E. Raja was elected from Sankarankoil constituency as a candidate of the DMK. He defeated the AIADMK candidate V. M. Rajalakshmi. He served as minister for Department of Adi Dravidar and Tribal Welfare (Tamil Nadu) during AIADMK rule from 2016 to 2021. After 30 years, DMK captured the constituency.

Raja won the Bronze Medal in the Asian Games Weightlifting held at Turkey in 2021.
