= Karungulam =

- Vagulagiri
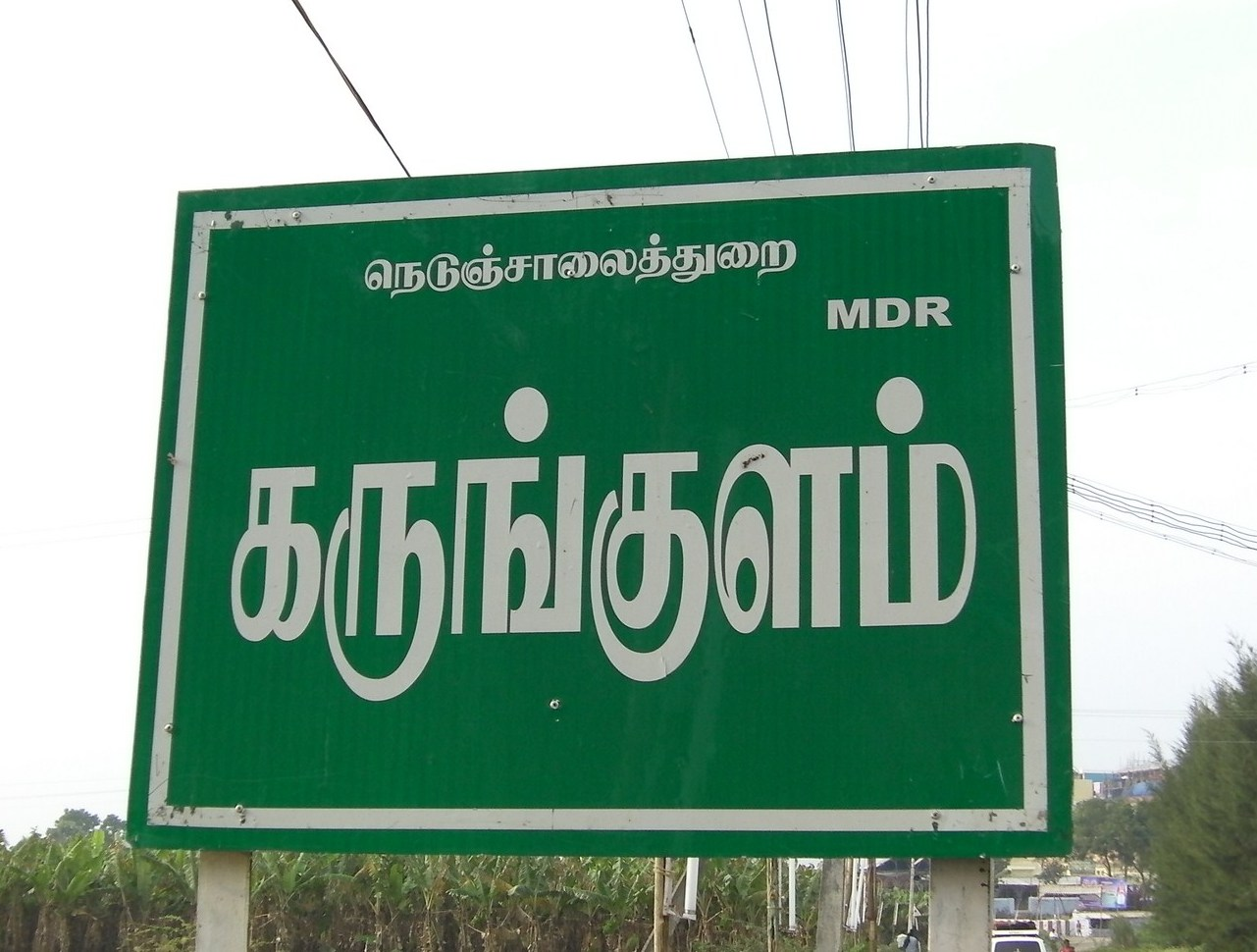
- Karungulam sign board

- Location of Karungulam in Tamil Nadu
- Coordinates: 8.81°N 78.04°E
- Country: India
- State: Tamil Nadu
- District: Tuticorin
- Former name: Krishna Thadakam

Government
  - Panchayat Chairman: Thiru. A. Kosalram Raja
  - Panchayat President: T. Pushpam
- Time zone: UTC+05:30 (IST)
- Postal code: 628 0xx
- Telephone code: 91 (0) 4630
- Vehicle registration: TN-92
- Official language: Tamil
- Website: www.facebook.com/Karungulam, www.youtube.com/VagulaTube

Karungulam is a village in Tamil Nadu, India. There are several villages in the state which share this name; this article is about the village in Thoothukudi district at Vagulagiri hill. The village is also called Marthandam Karungulam for the Lord Marthandeswara temple located at the entrance of the village on its northern border. The village is chiefly notable for its temples.

== Administration ==
Karungulam village in Thoothukudi district and has been under this jurisdiction since the bifurcation of Tirunelveli District.

== Geography ==
The Thamiraparani river flows on the eastern side of Karungulam village parallel to the Tirunelveli–Tiruchendur high road.

Vagulagiri is a small hillock situated on the southern bank of Thamparapani, on the northeastern side of the village. It is said to have gained its name from vagulam flowers which once covered the hill.The village is surrounded by lavish greeney and ponds. The occupation of the village is mainly agriculture.

== Religion and culture ==
Veneration is important to many of the people of Karungulam and those who visit the village and surrounding region.

Some believe that the Pushkarani water of Tirupati flows into the Thamiraparani river, making it sacred. Temples line both sides of the river along the Tirunelveli–Tiruchendur road, and people bathe in the river to purify their sins before going for darshan at Vagulagiri.

The village is near the Adichanallur where ancient people lived. Many burial urns protrude from the ground portion of Kotai Vasal. Coins and mud vessels have been unearthed during excavations for new construction.

Karungulam is sometimes called Marthandam Karungulam for the Lord Marthandeswara temple located at the entrance of the village on its northern border. The unique feature of this temple is that the Navagrahas are depicted with their wives, suggesting that it is very old.

A Navadurga (nine forms of Durga) temple unique to Tamil Nadu is located near the Marthandeswara temple. The nine durgas are Śhailaputrī, Brahmachāriṇī, Chandraghaṇṭā, Kushmanda, Skandamātā, Kārtyāyanī, Kālarātrī, Mahāgaurī and Siddhidātrī.

The Vagulari temple atop Vagulagiri hill enshrines its main deity, Lord Venkatachalapathy, in the form of two sticks ('ther kals'-form of sticks used to construct a chariot) made of sandalwood.There is a sannadhi for Lord Srinivasa and consorts which are believed to exist even before the sannadhi of Venkatachalapathy. Sannadhis of Lords Venkatesa and Srinivasa overlook the village and some believe that the deities protect the villagers from evils, communicable diseases and other dangers. The Chithirai festival attracts many devotees. Puratasi Sani Garuda Sevai is celebrated in the Saturdays of Puratasi, and the Pavithrothsavam festival is celebrated for three days in July.

Other temples surround the village. Sri Santhanamari Amman temple is managed by the Yadava community and located at the southern border. Sri Vadakku Vasal Selvi is at the northeastern border; Sri Angala Eshvari is at the western border.

It is believed that many Siddas have lived in Vagulagiri and that some are still living in Sukshma and Sthula forms. Rishi Agathiyar has visited this hill several times.

=== Vagulagiri Mahatmiam ===
Vagulagiri Mahatmiam is a small recorded palm chuvadi in which the existence of gods at Vagulagiri hill are depicted. The Krantham scripts explaining the consecration of the Vagulagiri Lords were translated into Tamil by the Sanskrit scholar Brammasri K. Venkatachala Sastrigal son of the great Mahamahophadyaya, Krishna Sastrigal. This sthhala purana (scholarly work on a place or temple) provides an insight into local history and customs.

According to this work, King Subakandan of Kalharam in the ancient country of Baagligam was suffering from a terrible illness and could find no medical relief. Subakandan turned to his faith in the deity of the seven hills, Venkatachalapathy. He went to Tiruppathy where he performed prayers, penances and arathanas, and eventually received a vision of the deity. The vision instructed Subakandan to erect a chariot of sandalwood. Two sticks of sandalwood were leftover, in which Venkatachalapathy would remain. Subakandan fulfilled a request to take these sticks to the hill at Karungulam and consecrated the sticks between a holy tamarind tree and the Sri Srnivasa temple. Venkatachalapathy was then worshipped at the temple alongside Sri Srnivasa.

== Gallery ==
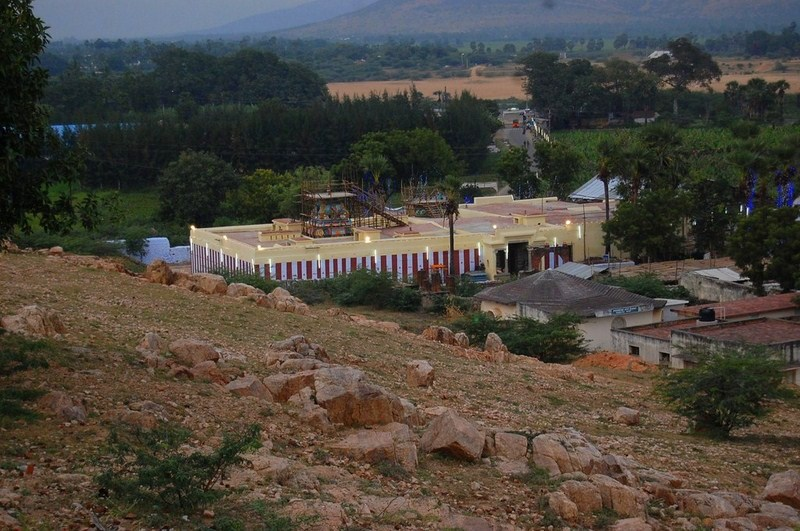
Karungulam Sivan Kovil

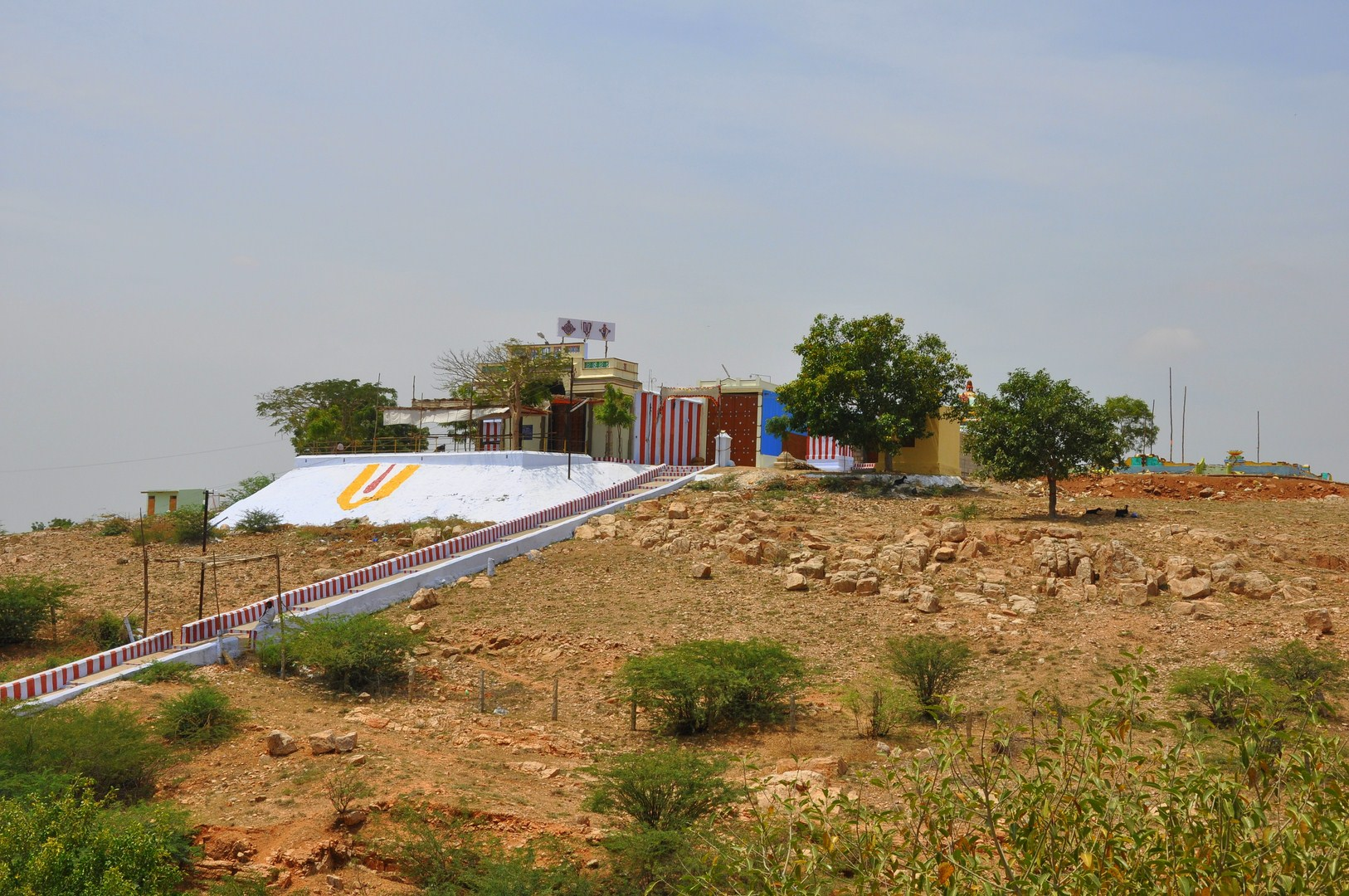
Karungulam Perumal Kovil

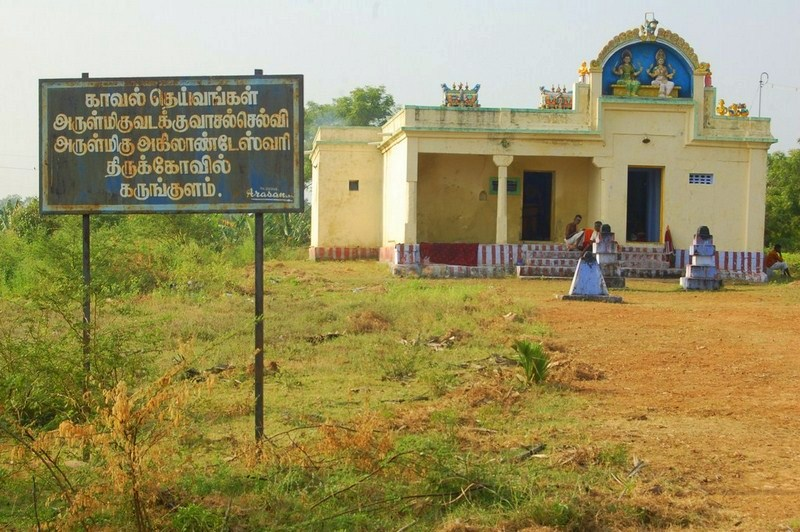

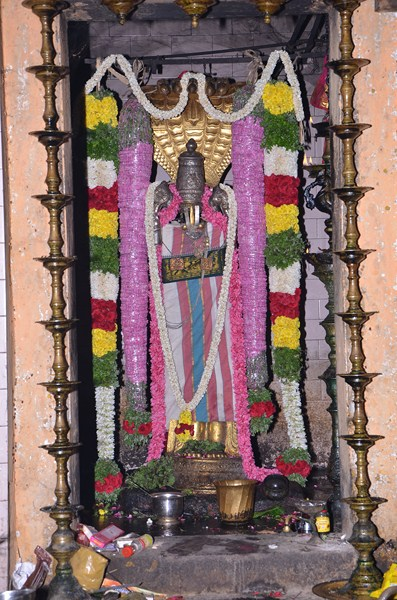

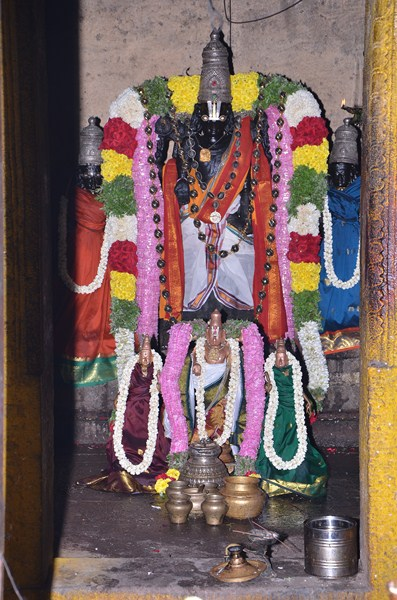

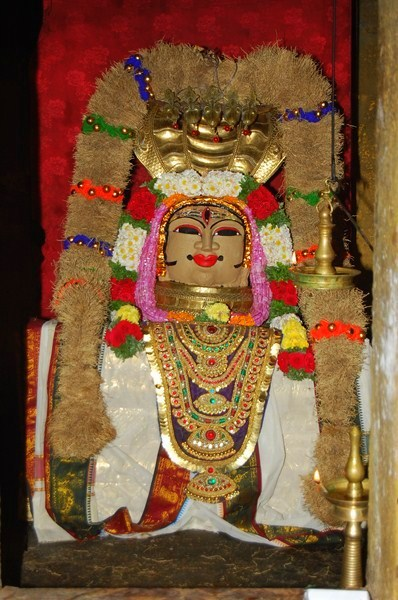

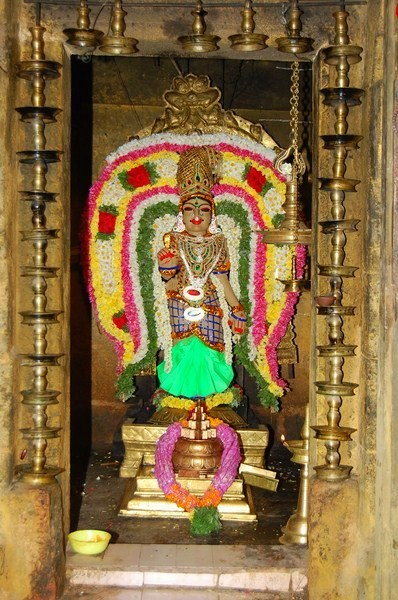
Kulasekari
