= Sankarankoil Assembly constituency =

One of the 234 State Legislative Assembly Constituencies in Tamil Nadu in India

Coordinates: 9.18°N 77.54°E

Sankarankoil
- Constituency No. 219 for the Tamil Nadu Legislative Assembly

Constituency details
- Country: India
- Region: South India
- State: Tamil Nadu
- District: Tenkasi
- Lok Sabha constituency: Tenkasi
- Established: 1951
- Total electors: 238,082
- Reservation: SC

Member of Legislative Assembly
- 17th Tamil Nadu Legislative Assembly
- Incumbent Dr. Dhilipan Jaishankar
- Party: AIADMK
- Alliance: NDA
- Elected year: 2026

Sankarankoil is a state assembly constituency in Tamil Nadu. It is reserved for the Scheduled Castes. Elections and winners in the constituency are listed below. It is a part of Tenkasi Lok Sabha constituency. It is one of the 234 State Legislative Assembly Constituencies in Tamil Nadu.

== Members of the Legislative Assembly ==
=== Madras State ===
Year	Name	Party
1952	Ramasundara Karunalaya Pandian	Independent
1952	P. Urkavalan	Indian National Congress
1957	A. R. Subbiah Mudaliar and P. Urkavalan	Indian National Congress
1962	S. M. Abdul Majid Sahib	Indian National Congress
1967	P. Durairaj	Dravida Munnetra Kazhagam

=== Tamil Nadu ===
Year	Name	Party
1971	S. Subbiah	Dravida Munnetra Kazhagam
1977	S. Subbiah	Dravida Munnetra Kazhagam
1980	P. Durairaj	All India Anna Dravida Munnetra Kazhagam
1984	S. Sankaralingam	All India Anna Dravida Munnetra Kazhagam
1989	S. Thangavelu	Dravida Munnetra Kazhagam
1991	V. Gopalakrishnan	All India Anna Dravida Munnetra Kazhagam
1996	C. Karuppasamy	All India Anna Dravida Munnetra Kazhagam
2001	C. Karuppasamy	All India Anna Dravida Munnetra Kazhagam
2006	C. Karuppasamy	All India Anna Dravida Munnetra Kazhagam
2011	C. Karuppasamy	All India Anna Dravida Munnetra Kazhagam
2012^	S. Muthuselvi	All India Anna Dravida Munnetra Kazhagam
2016	V. M. Rajalakshmi	All India Anna Dravida Munnetra Kazhagam
2021	E. Raja	Dravida Munnetra Kazhagam
2026	Dr. Dhilipan Jaishankar	All India Anna Dravida Munnetra Kazhagam

^ By-elections were held on the account of vacancy due to the demise of the sitting MLA.

== Election results ==
Vote share of winning candidates
2026	33.01%
2021	38.92%
2016	44.36%
2012 by-election	59.4%
2011	49.99%
2006	40.33%
2001	43.51%
1996	33.94%
1991	61.88%
1989	43.99%
1984	54.45%
1980	48.87%
1977	34.26%
1971	61.84%
1967	62.79%
1962	52.41%
1957	27.80%
1952	36.81%

=== 2026 ===
2026 Tamil Nadu Legislative Assembly election: Sankarankoil
Party	Candidate	Votes	%	±%
AIADMK	Dr. Dhilipan Jaishankar	64,865	33.01	▼3.41
TVK	C. Ramarajan	58,376	29.71	New
INC	Sangai Ganesan	42,567	21.66	
AIPTMMK	Vasanthi Murugesan	8,006	4.07	
PT	Prabakaran	4,612	2.35	▲1.28
Independent	K Suresh	766	0.39	
Independent	Anand	661	0.34	
NOTA	NOTA	560	0.29	
Margin of victory		6,489		
Turnout		1,96,480		
Rejected ballots				
Registered electors				
gain from		Swing		

=== 2021 ===
2021 Tamil Nadu Legislative Assembly election: Sankarankoil
Party	Candidate	Votes	%	±%
DMK	E. Raja	71,347	39.34%	+3.13
AIADMK	V. M. Rajalakshmi	66,050	36.42%	−7.95
AMMK	R. Annadurai	22,682	12.51%	New
MNM	K. Prabhu	2,338	1.29%	New
NOTA	NOTA	1,957	1.08%	−0.19
PT	V. Subramaniam	1,941	1.07%	New
Margin of victory		5,297	2.92%	−5.24%
Turnout		181,381	71.34%	−4.62%
Rejected ballots		420	0.23%	
Registered electors		254,243		
DMK gain from AIADMK		Swing	-5.03%	

=== 2016 ===
2016 Tamil Nadu Legislative Assembly election: Sankarankoil
Party	Candidate	Votes	%	±%
AIADMK	V. M. Rajalakshmi	78,751	44.36%	−5.63
DMK	G. Anbumani	64,262	36.20%	−6.6
MDMK	Dr. T. Sadhan Tirumalaikumar	20,807	11.72%	New
BJP	K. Gunasekaran	4,242	2.39%	+1.1
NOTA	NOTA	2,258	1.27%	New
AIFB	K. Murugan	1,042	0.59%	New
Margin of victory		14,489	8.16%	0.97%
Turnout		177,510	75.97%	0.25%
Registered electors		233,672		
AIADMK hold		Swing	-5.63%	

=== 2012 by-election ===
By-election, 2012: Sankarankovil
Party	Candidate	Votes	%	±%
AIADMK	S. Muthuselvi	94,977	59.4	
DMK	J. Jawahar SuryaKumar	26220	16.4	
MDMK	T. Sadhan Tirumalaikumar	20,678	12.9	
DMDK	K. Muthukumar	12,144	2.05	
BJP	L. Murugan	1,633	0.10	
Majority		68,757	43	
Turnout		1,59,772		
AIADMK gain from DMK		Swing		

=== 2011 ===
2011 Tamil Nadu Legislative Assembly election: Sankarankoil
Party	Candidate	Votes	%	±%
AIADMK	C. Karuppasamy	72,297	49.99%	+9.66
DMK	M. Umamaheswari	61,902	42.80%	+6.01
Independent	A. Lakshmi Nathan	2,198	1.52%	New
Independent	S. Rajendran	1,917	1.33%	New
BJP	C. Saratha	1,862	1.29%	New
Independent	P. Subbulakshmi	1,210	0.84%	New
Independent	S. Gunaseelan	895	0.62%	New
BSP	A. Kumar Alias	815	0.56%	−7.42
Margin of victory		10,395	7.19%	3.65%
Turnout		144,622	75.71%	6.23%
Registered electors		191,012		
AIADMK hold		Swing	9.66%	

=== 2006 ===
2006 Tamil Nadu Legislative Assembly election: Sankarankoil
Party	Candidate	Votes	%	±%
AIADMK	C. Karuppasamy	50,603	40.33%	−3.18
DMK	S. Thangavelu	46,161	36.79%	New
PT	A. Karuppasamy	10,015	7.98%	New
AIFB	P. Subbulakshmi	9,740	7.76%	New
DMDK	K. Muthukumar	5,531	4.41%	New
Independent	K. Subbulakshmi	1,351	1.08%	New
SP	S. Kanagaraj	1,250	1.00%	New
Independent	S. Ganesan	817	0.65%	New
Margin of victory		4,442	3.54%	−4.21%
Turnout		125,468	69.48%	5.08%
Registered electors		180,575		
AIADMK hold		Swing	-3.18%	

=== 2001 ===
2001 Tamil Nadu Legislative Assembly election: Sankarankoil
Party	Candidate	Votes	%	±%
AIADMK	C. Karuppasamy	52,000	43.51%	+9.57
PT	P. Duraisamy	42,738	35.76%	New
MDMK	Dr. T. Sadhan Tirumalaikumar	20,610	17.25%	−10.4
Independent	S. Vijayaraj	1,548	1.30%	New
Independent	P. Subramanian	1,069	0.89%	New
Independent	M. Krishnammal	836	0.70%	New
Independent	N. Chinnadurai	699	0.58%	New
Margin of victory		9,262	7.75%	7.21%
Turnout		119,500	64.40%	−4.90%
Registered electors		185,591		
AIADMK hold		Swing	9.57%	

=== 1996 ===
1996 Tamil Nadu Legislative Assembly election: Sankarankoil
Party	Candidate	Votes	%	±%
AIADMK	C. Karuppasamy	37,933	33.94%	−27.94
DMK	S. Rasiah @ Raja	37,333	33.41%	−3.16
MDMK	S. Thangavelu	30,893	27.64%	New
PMK	M. Ilangavi	2,009	1.80%	New
BJP	P. Shanmugavelu	1,733	1.55%	New
JP	C. Mariappan	696	0.62%	New
Margin of victory		600	0.54%	−24.78%
Turnout		111,752	69.30%	1.89%
Registered electors		173,541		
AIADMK hold		Swing	-27.94%	

=== 1991 ===
1991 Tamil Nadu Legislative Assembly election: Sankarankoil
Party	Candidate	Votes	%	±%
AIADMK	V. Gopalakrishnan	65,620	61.88%	+38.52
DMK	S. Thangavelu	38,772	36.56%	−7.43
PMK	M. Karuppasamy	916	0.86%	New
Margin of victory		26,848	25.32%	4.69%
Turnout		106,043	67.41%	−6.31%
Registered electors		163,079		
AIADMK gain from DMK		Swing	17.89%	

=== 1989 ===
1989 Tamil Nadu Legislative Assembly election: Sankarankoil
Party	Candidate	Votes	%	±%
DMK	S. Thangavelu	46,886	43.99%	+3.47
AIADMK	K. Marutha Karuppan	24,897	23.36%	−31.09
INC	S. Anandaraj	24,628	23.11%	New
AIADMK	S. Sankaralingam	6,846	6.42%	−48.03
Independent	S. Rajaram	2,045	1.92%	New
Margin of victory		21,989	20.63%	6.70%
Turnout		106,581	73.73%	0.46%
Registered electors		147,593		
DMK gain from AIADMK		Swing	-10.46%	

=== 1984 ===
1984 Tamil Nadu Legislative Assembly election: Sankarankoil
Party	Candidate	Votes	%	±%
AIADMK	S. Sankaralingam	48,411	54.45%	+5.58
DMK	S. Thangavelu	36,028	40.52%	−4.69
Independent	K. Madasamy	3,569	4.01%	New
Independent	S. Shanmugaraj	582	0.65%	New
Margin of victory		12,383	13.93%	10.27%
Turnout		88,907	73.27%	19.04%
Registered electors		130,144		
AIADMK hold		Swing	5.58%	

=== 1980 ===
1980 Tamil Nadu Legislative Assembly election: Sankarankoil
Party	Candidate	Votes	%	±%
AIADMK	P. Durairaj	31,818	48.87%	+15.15
DMK	K. Madan	29,436	45.21%	+10.96
Independent	U. Minnavadi	3,000	4.61%	New
Independent	P. Muthiah	508	0.78%	New
Independent	K. Panneer Selvam	345	0.53%	New
Margin of victory		2,382	3.66%	3.12%
Turnout		65,107	54.23%	1.46%
Registered electors		121,949		
AIADMK gain from DMK		Swing	14.61%	

=== 1977 ===
1977 Tamil Nadu Legislative Assembly election: Sankarankoil
Party	Candidate	Votes	%	±%
DMK	S. Subbiah	21,569	34.26%	−27.58
AIADMK	C. Ayyadorai	21,232	33.72%	New
INC	S. Shanmugavel	14,491	23.01%	−15.15
DMK	A. K. C. Thangappandian	13,778	21.88%	−39.95
JP	L. Sundararaj Naicker	7,187	11.41%	New
JP	A. M. Chellachami	4,967	7.89%	New
Independent	R. Kovil Pillai	2,602	4.13%	New
Independent	S. Pachiappan	706	1.12%	New
Margin of victory		337	0.54%	−23.14%
Turnout		62,965	52.77%	−12.16%
Registered electors		121,097		
DMK hold		Swing	-27.58%	

=== 1971 ===
1971 Tamil Nadu Legislative Assembly election: Sankarankoil
Party	Candidate	Votes	%	±%
DMK	S. Subbiah	35,677	61.84%	−0.95
INC	M. James	22,019	38.16%	+5.71
Margin of victory		13,658	23.67%	−6.67%
Turnout		57,696	64.93%	−6.06%
Registered electors		93,951		
DMK hold		Swing	-0.95%	

=== 1967 ===
1967 Madras Legislative Assembly election: Sankarankoil
Party	Candidate	Votes	%	±%
DMK	P. Durairaj	37,173	62.79%	+36.6
INC	P. Urkavalan	19,211	32.45%	−19.96
Independent	V. K. Madaswamy	1,482	2.50%	New
Independent	K. Chelliah	1,336	2.26%	New
Margin of victory		17,962	30.34%	4.12%
Turnout		59,202	70.99%	−1.77%
Registered electors		89,463		
DMK gain from INC		Swing	10.38%	

=== 1962 ===
1962 Madras Legislative Assembly election: Sankarankoil
Party	Candidate	Votes	%	±%
INC	S. M. Abdul Majid Sahib	32,799	52.41%	+24.61
DMK	S. Krishnan Servai	16,388	26.19%	New
SWA	L. M. K. Balasubramaniam Chettiar	10,391	16.60%	New
Independent	K. Ayyadurai	3,001	4.80%	New
Margin of victory		16,411	26.22%	22.35%
Turnout		62,579	72.75%	−10.39%
Registered electors		89,446		
INC hold		Swing	24.61%	

=== 1957 ===
1957 Madras Legislative Assembly election: Sankarankoil
Party	Candidate	Votes	%	±%
INC	P. Urkavalan	40,397	27.80%	+3.19
INC	A. R. Subbiah Mudaliar	34,771	23.93%	−0.68
Independent	Adinamilagi	21,907	15.08%	New
PSP	S. Uthaman (Sc)	12,374	8.52%	New
Independent	Vallathurai	10,310	7.10%	New
Independent	Shanmugam (Sc)	9,937	6.84%	New
Independent	Subbiah (Sc)	9,104	6.27%	New
Independent	Ganapathy	6,511	4.48%	New
Margin of victory		5,626	3.87%	−8.34%
Turnout		145,311	83.15%	−26.87%
Registered electors		174,765		
INC gain from Independent		Swing	-9.01%	

=== 1952 ===
1952 Madras Legislative Assembly election: Sankarankoil
Party	Candidate	Votes	%	±%
Independent	Ramasundara Karunalaya Pandian	56,256	36.81%	New
INC	K. Sattanatha Karayalar	37,603	24.61%	New
INC	P. Urkavalan	29,967	19.61%	New
Independent	O. Sappani	11,313	7.40%	New
Independent	Sithanatha Kutumban	9,683	6.34%	New
Independent	Rakkan	4,221	2.76%	New
Independent	Karuppiah	3,766	2.46%	New
Margin of victory		18,653	12.21%	
Turnout		152,809	110.02%	
Registered electors		138,896		
Independent win (new seat)				
