= R. Eswaran =

Indian politician

Member of the Tamil Nadu Legislative Assembly
- In office 31 December 1984 – 11 May 2006
- Preceded by: R. Krishnan
- Succeeded by: Dr.T. Sadhan Tirumalaikumar
- Constituency: Vasudevanallur

Personal details
- Party: Indian National Congress (1984-1996), Tamil Maanila Congress (Moopanar) (1996-2006)
- Occupation: Politician

R. Eswaran is an Indian politician and former Member of the Legislative Assembly. He was elected to the Tamil Nadu legislative assembly from Vasudevanallur constituency, in the 1984, 1989, and 1991 elections as an Indian National Congress candidate. He then won the same seat in 1996 and 2001 as a Tamil Maanila Congress (Moopanar) candidate. Before becoming an MLA he took charge as the President of Ramanathapuram Panchayat in Tirunelveli District.

== Personal life ==
He has five daughters and a son.

== Electoral career ==
=== Tamilnadu Legislative Assembly Elections ===
Elections	Constituency	Party	Result	Vote percentage	Opposition Candidate	Opposition Party	Opposition vote percentage
1980 Tamil Nadu Legislative Assembly election	Vasudevanallur	INC	Lost	45.65	R. Krishnan	CPI(M)	50.51
1984 Tamil Nadu Legislative Assembly election	Vasudevanallur	INC	Won	62.34	M. S. Periasamy	CPI(M)	34.55
1989 Tamil Nadu Legislative Assembly election	Vasudevanallur	INC	Won	32.15	R. Krishnan	CPI(M)	31.72
1991 Tamil Nadu Legislative Assembly election	Vasudevanallur	INC	Won	58.28	S. Madasamy	CPI(M)	36.63
1996 Tamil Nadu Legislative Assembly election	Vasudevanallur	TMC(M)	Won	32.50	P. Suresh Babu	INC	31.89
2001 Tamil Nadu Legislative Assembly election	Vasudevanallur	TMC(M)	Won	47.05	P. Suresh Babu	PT	35.73
