= Konur =

Konur may refer to:

- Konur (novel) ("Women"), Icelandic novel by Steinar Bragi
- Konur, Nallur block, India
- Konur, Gülnar, Turkey
