= S. Subbiah =

Indian politician

Member of the Tamil Nadu Legislative Assembly
- In office 1971–1980
- Constituency: Sankarankoil

S. Subbiah is an Indian politician and former Member of the Legislative Assembly. He was elected to the Tamil Nadu legislative assembly from Sankaranayanarkoil constituency in 1971 and 1977 elections as a Dravida Munnetra Kazhagam candidate. Former National president of ABVP.
