= P. Lingam =

Indian politician

P. Lingam is an Indian politician and former member of the Parliament of India from Tenkasi Constituency from 2009 to 2014. He represents the Communist Party of India party.
