= M. Arunachalam (politician) =

Indian politician

- அருணாச்சலம்
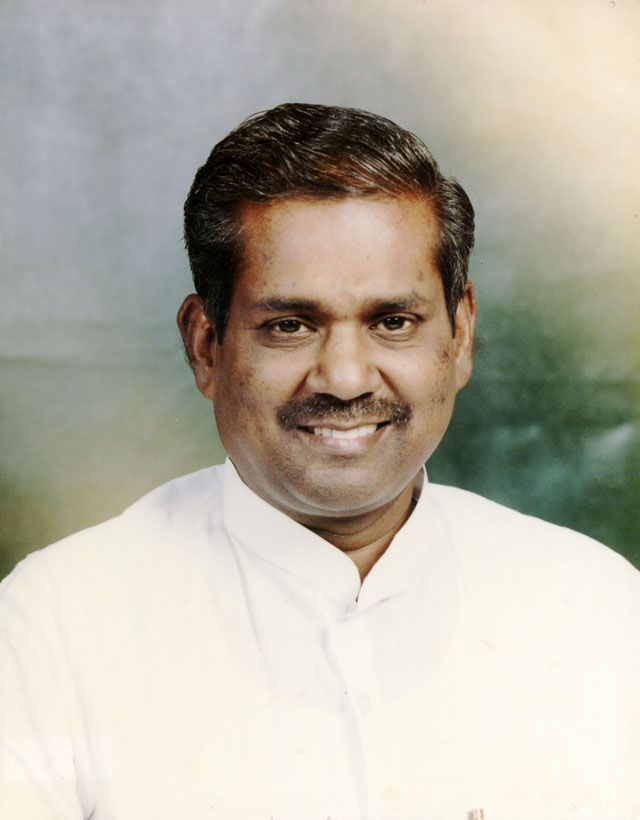
- M.Arunachalam, 1944-2004

Minister for Chemicals and Fertilizers
- In office 9 June 1997 — 19 March 1998
- Prime Minister: Inder Kumar Gujral
- Constituency: Tenkasi

Minister of Labour and Employment
- In office 29 June 1996 — 21 April 1997
- Prime Minister: H. D. Deve Gowda
- Constituency: Tenkasi

Minister of Housing and Urban Affairs
- In office 1 June 1996 — 29 June 1996
- Prime Minister: H.D. Deve Gowda
- Constituency: Tenkasi

Minister of State for Micro, Small and Medium Enterprises
- In office 1993–1995
- Prime Minister: P. V. Narasimha Rao
- Constituency: Tenkasi

Minister of State for Housing and Urban Affairs
- In office 1991–1993
- Prime Minister: P. V. Narasimha Rao
- Constituency: Tenkasi

Minister of State for Commerce and Industry
- In office 25 September 1985 — 2 December 1989
- Prime Minister: Rajiv Gandhi
- Constituency: Tenkasi

Member of Union Committee on Subordinate Legislation
- In office January 1990 to September 1990
- Prime Minister: Rajiv Gandhi
- Constituency: Tenkasi

Member of Parliament, Lok Sabha
- In office 1977–1998
- Preceded by: A. M. C.Nellachami
- Succeeded by: S. Murugesan

President of Tamilnadu Youth Congress
- In office 1977–1981

District Youth Congress Secretary, Tirunelveli District
- In office 1972–1977

Personal details
- Born: 4 March 1944 Vellanaikottai, Tinnevely District Madras Presidency, British Raj (now Tamil Nadu, India)
- Died: 21 January 2004 (aged 59) Chennai, Tamil Nadu, India
- Party: Indian National Congress (1966-1996) and (2002-2004)Tamil Maanila Congress (1996-2002)
- Spouse: Amala Arunachalam (m. 1974)
- Children: 4

Moockiah Arunachalam (4 March 1944 – 21 January 2004) was an Indian politician and Union Minister. Arunachalam did his B.L. from Dr. Ambedkar Government Law College, Chennai and his pre-university course from V.O. Chidambaram College at Thoothukudi. He graduated from St. Xaviers College, Palayamkottai, and pursued his post-graduation from Gandhigram University, Dindigul. He was elected to the Lok Sabha from Tenkasi constituency for six times continuously. He was elected as an Indian National Congress candidate in 1977, 1980, 1984, 1989 and 1991 elections and as a Tamil Maanila Congress (Moopanar) candidate in the 1996 election.

== Career and personal life ==
M. Arunachalam was born on 4 March 1944 to Mr. Moockiah and Mrs. Muthammal in Vellanaikottai village, in the Tenkasi district of Tamil Nadu. He did his pre-university course from V.O. Chidambram College Tuticorin, graduated from St. Xaviers College, Palayamkottai, his post-graduation from Gandhigram University, Dindugul, and Bachelor of Law from Law College, Chennai.

After he got his law degree, his ambition of becoming a lawyer was fulfilled. He started his career as a junior advocate under T.S. Ramanatha Iyer – a straightforward, upright person with Gandhian principles who was called ‘Tiger of the bar’ in Tenkasi. By sheer hard work and perseverance, he had a roaring practice, soon he established an office for himself and expanded it with four colleagues and two juniors. He was selected for the post of Munsif for Pondicherry Sessions court, which he did not want to join.

He was married to Amala in 1974 and has 4 children namely: Mohan Arunachalam, Sangeetha, Priya, Deepan Arunachalam. And 4 grandchildren namely: Irene Johnson, Marina J., Deanna A., Devante A..

== Political career ==
As a mere party volunteer, he was Youth Congress Secretary in Tirunelveli (District Congress Committee). In 1977 he first contested, won and became the Member of Parliament from Tenkasi constituency and continued to hold the seat till 1998. He was also appointed as Union Cabinet Minister for 3 times and State Minister for 3 times in his political career.

== Lok Sabha elections ==
Elections	Constituency	Party	Result	Vote percentage	Opposition Candidate	Opposition Party	Opposition vote percentage
1977 Indian general election	Tenkasi	INC	Won	67.6	Rajagopalan S	INC(O)	26.2
1980 Indian general election	Tenkasi	INC	Won	53.4	Rajagopalan S	JP	36.6
1984 Indian general election	Tenkasi	INC	Won	64.7	R.Krishnan	CPM	30.3
1989 Indian general election	Tenkasi	INC	Won	62.5	R.Krishnan	CPM	35.04
1991 Indian general election	Tenkasi	INC	Won	63.56	T. Sadhan Tirumalaikumar	DMK	33.24
1996 Indian general election	Tenkasi	TMC	Won	44.98	Selvaraj.V	INC	30.14
1998 Indian general election	Tenkasi	TMC	Lost	26.77	S. Murugesan	AIADMK	41.84

=== Positions held ===
- 1972–1977: was appointed as District Youth Congress Secretary, Tirunelveli District
- 1977–1981: was appointed as President – Tamil Nadu Youth Congress
- 1977-1980: was Elected to Lok Sabha (Sixth) for the 1st time
- 1980-1984: was Elected to Lok Sabha (Seventh) for the 2nd time
- 1984-1989: was Elected to Lok Sabha (Eighth) for the 3rd time
- 1985-1989: Minister of State, Industries
- 1989-1991: was Elected to Lok Sabha (Ninth) for the 4th time
- January 1990–September 1990: was appointed as Member of Committee on Subordinate Legislation
- 1991-1996: was Elected to Lok Sabha (Tenth) for the 5th time
- 1991-1993: Minister of State, Urban Development
- 1993-1995: Minister of State, Small Scale and Agro Industries
- 1996-1998: was Elected to Lok Sabha (Eleventh) for the 6th time
- a few months in 1996: Cabinet minister for Urban Development and Employment
- August 1996-May 1997: Cabinet minister for Ministry of Labour
- June 1997-December 1997: Cabinet minister for Chemicals and Fertilizers

== Death ==
M. Arunachalam died of cardiac arrest on 21 January 2004 in Chennai at the age of 60.
