= P. Durairaj =

Indian politician

P. Durairaj is an Indian politician and former Member of the Legislative Assembly. He was elected to the Tamil Nadu legislative assembly from Sankaranayanarkoil constituency in 1967 election as Dravida Munnetra Kazhagam candidate and 1980 election as an Anna Dravida Munnetra Kazhagam candidate.
