= A. Manoharan =

Indian politician

Member of the Tamil Nadu Legislative Assembly
- In office 16 May 2016 – 6 May 2021
- Constituency: Vasudevanallur

Personal details
- Party: Tamilaga Vettri Kazhagam (since 15 February 2026)
- Other political affiliations: All India Anna Dravida Munnetra Kazhagam (–2025)

A. Manoharan (born 7 June 1978) is an Indian politician who served as a Member of Legislative Assembly of Tamil Nadu. He was elected from Vasudevanallur Assembly constituency as an All India Anna Dravida Munnetra Kazhagam candidate in 2016.
