= M. Vasanthi =

Indian politician

Member of the India Parliament for Tenkasi
- In office 1 September 2014 – 23 May 2019
- Constituency: Tenkasi

Personal details
- Born: 14 March 1962 (age 64) Karungulam, Tuticorin, Tamil Nadu
- Party: All India Anna Dravida Munnetra Kazhagam
- Spouse: S. Murugesan
- Children: 4
- Education: Annamalai University
- Occupation: Political and Social Worker
- As of 17 December, 2016

Murugesan Vasanthi is an Indian politician and was a Member of Parliament elected from Tamil Nadu. She was elected to the Lok Sabha from Tenkasi constituency as an Anna Dravida Munnetra Kazhagam candidate in 2014 election. Her husband, S. Murugesan was elected from the same constituency in 1998 and 1999 elections as All India Anna Dravida Munnetra Kazhagam candidate.

== Elections Contested ==
=== Lok Sabha Elections ===
Elections	Constituency	Party	Result	Vote percentage	Opposition Candidate	Opposition Party	Opposition vote percentage
2014	Tenkasi	AIADMK	Won	42.31	Dr.K. Krishnasamy	PT	26.19
