= V. M. Rajalakshmi =

Indian politicians

Cabinet Minister Government of Tamil Nadu
- In office 22 May 2016 – 7May 2021
- Chief Minister: J. Jayalalithaa
- Ministry and Departments: Adi Dravidar and Tribal Welfare
- Succeeded by: N. Kayalvizhi

Member of the 15th Tamil Nadu Assembly
- In office 2012–2021
- Constituency: Sankarankoil

Personal details
- Party: AIADMK

V. M. Rajalakshmi is an Indian politician who served as a member of the 15th Tamil Nadu Legislative Assembly. She was elected from Sankarankoil constituency as a candidate of the All India Anna Dravida Munnetra Kazhagam (AIADMK). J. Jayalalithaa appointed V. M. Rajalakshmi as Minister for Adi Dravidar and Tribal Welfare in May 2016. This was her first cabinet post in the Government of Tamil Nadu.

In 2021, she lost her reelection bid to E. Raja.
