= M. Appadurai =

Indian politician

Member of parliament
- Preceded by: Murugesan.S
- Succeeded by: Lingam.P
- Constituency: Tenkasi

Personal details
- Born: 11 December 1949 (age 76) Thoothukudi, Tamil Nadu
- Party: CPI
- Spouse: Chandramathy S.
- Children: 1 Daughter and 1 Son
- As of September, 2007

M. Appadurai (born 11 December 1949) was a member of the 14th Lok Sabha of India. He represented the Tenkasi constituency of Tamil Nadu and is a member of the Communist Party of India (CPI) political party. He is professionally a Social Worker. He was elected in the legislative assembly elections (1980–1984) in Tamil Nadu. He represented the Ottapidaram (State Assembly Constituency).
