= S. Muthuselvi =

Indian politician

Sankaralingam Muthuselvi is an Indian politician and was a member of the Tamil Nadu Legislative Assembly from the Sankarankoil Constituency. She represents the All India Anna Dravida Munnetra Kazhagam party.

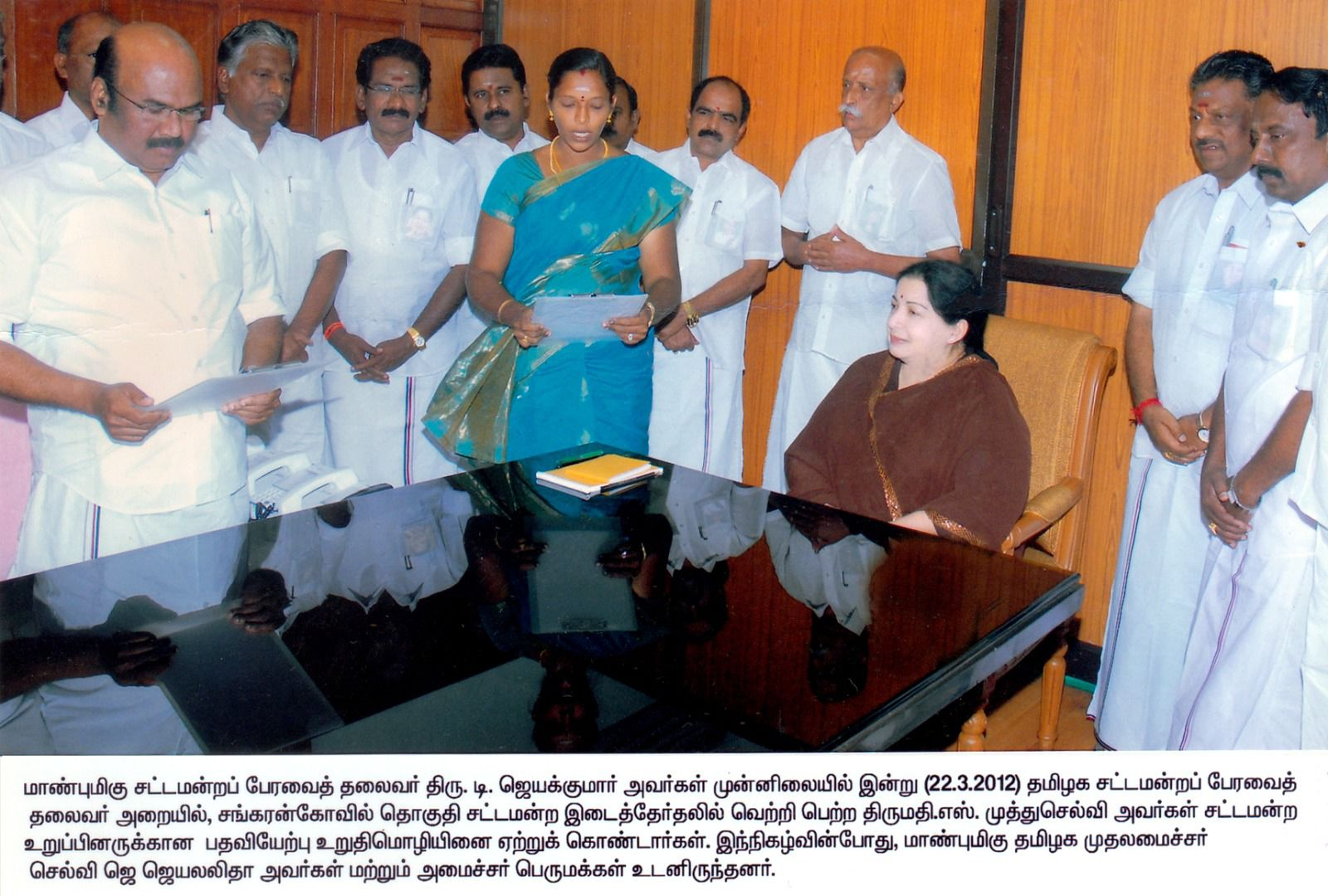
Muthuselvi takes oath as MLA in 2013

She has completed B.E ( Electronics & Instrumentation Engineering ) from The Rajaas Engineering College - Vadakkankulam.

She is the daughter of Former Sankarankoil MLA S. Sankaralingam.
