= Withanolide =

Group of steroid compounds

Withaferin A

Salpichrolid A

Nicandrenon-1

Ixocarpalacton A

Withanolides are a group of at least 300 naturally occurring steroids built on an ergostane skeleton. They occur as secondary metabolites primarily in genera of the Nightshade family, for example in the tomatillo.

Structurally, withanolides consist of a steroid backbone bound to a lactone or one of its derivatives; they are produced via oxidation of steroids. It remains unknown to what end withanolides are produced; they may act as a deterrent for feeding insect larvae and other herbivores.

Genera within the nightshade family that produce withanolides include: Datura, Iochroma, Lycium, Nicandra, Physalis, Salpichroa, Solanum, Mandragora, Withania, and Jaborosa. No withanolide has been discovered in Nicotiana to date.

== Examples ==
Withaferin A, the first withanolide to be isolated, was found in winter cherry (Withania somnifera) and Acnistus arborescens.

Salpichrolides A, B and G (isolated from Salpichroa origanifolia) exhibit an inhibitory effect on the growth of larva of the Mediterranean fruit fly (Ceratitis capitata). For this reason, potential pesticide uses for the compounds are being explored.
