= Durai =

Durai may refer to:

- Durai (film), a 2008 Indian Tamil-language film by A. Venkatesh

== People ==
=== Given name ===
- Durai Chandrasekar, Indian INC politician from Tamil Nadu
- Durai Chandrasekaran, Indian DMK politician from Tamil Nadu
- Durai Govindarajan, Indian AIADMK politician from Tamil Nadu
- Durai Manivel, Indian AIADMK politician from Tamil Nadu
- Durai Murugan (born 1938), Indian DMK politician and lawyer from Tamil Nadu
- Durai Ramasamy, Indian INC/AIADMK politician from Tamil Nadu
- Durai Sundar, Indian computational biologist and bioinformatician
- Durai Vaiko (born 1972), Indian MDMK politician from Tamil Nadu
- B. Dorai Raj (died 2000), Indian filmmaker
- R. S. Durai Senthilkumar, Indian film director, screenwriter, and lyricist

=== Surname ===
- Durai (director) (J.F.C. Durai, born 1940), Indian film director in Tamil cinema
- M. Durai, Indian PMK politician from Tamil Nadu
- T. T. Durai (born 1948), former CEO of the National Kidney Foundation Singapore
- V. Z. Durai, Indian film director

== See also ==
- Dharma Durai (disambiguation)
