= M. Selvi =

M. Selvi Murugesan

Member of the Legislative Assembly, Tamil Nadu Legislative Assembly
- In office 2001–2006
- Preceded by: N. S. Rajkumar Manraadiar
- Succeeded by: S. Sekar
- Constituency: Kangayam

Personal details
- Born: 17 October 1964 Kangeyam
- Party: All India Anna Dravida Munnetra Kazhagam
- Other political affiliations: Bharatiya Janata Party
- Profession: Agriculture

M. Selvi Murugesan (M. Selvi) is an Indian politician and a former Member of the Tamil Nadu Legislative Assembly. She hails from Kangeyam in the Erode district. A postgraduate, Selvi was a member of the All India Anna Dravida Munnetra Kazhagam (AIADMK) party. She was elected as a Member of the Legislative Assembly (MLA) from the Kangayam Assembly constituency in the 2001 Tamil Nadu Assembly elections. Later, she joined the Bharatiya Janata Party (BJP).

== Electoral Performance ==
=== 2001 ===
2001 Tamil Nadu Legislative Assembly election: Kangayam
Party	Candidate	Votes	%	±%
AIADMK	M. Selvi	58,700	51.06	17.49
DMK	N. S. Rajkumar Manraadiar	47,426	41.25	−15.42
MDMK	S. Jagadesan	4,777	4.16	−2.50
Independent	S. Venkataramanan	1,797	1.56	
Independent	P. Raju	677	0.59	
Independent	P. Sampath	422	0.37	
Independent	V. P. Periasamy	317	0.28	
Independent	P. M. Karthikeyan	233	0.20	
Independent	A. K. Krishnan	229	0.20	
Independent	M. Thangamani	207	0.18	
Independent	R. Chinnasamy	177	0.15	
Margin of victory		11,274	9.81	−13.30
Turnout		114,962	65.38	−3.73
Registered electors		175,834		
AIADMK gain from DMK		Swing	-5.61	
