= Durai Sundar =

Indian scientist

- Born: Pondicherry, India
- Education: Pondicherry University; Johns Hopkins University
- Known for: Studies on genome editing tools, natural drugs and metabolic engineering
- Awards: 2005 NASI Swarna Jayanti Award; 2006 DST Young Scientist Award; 2006 DST Innovative Young Biotechnologist Award; 2006 ISCA Young Scientist Award; 2008 INSA Young Scientist Medal; 2011 LTMT Young Researcher Award; 2012 N-BIOS Prize; 2013 ABA Young Scientist Award; 2013 ISCA Prof. Umakant Sinha Memorial Award
- Scientific career
- Fields: Computational biology; Bioinformatics
- Workplaces: IIT Delhi

Durai Sundar is an Indian computational biologist, bioinformatician and the current Head of the Department of Biochemical Engineering and Biotechnology at the Indian Institute of Technology, Delhi. He is known for his studies in the fields of genome editing tool designing, biological studies of natural drugs and metabolic engineering as well as for his participation in the Indo-Japanese collaborative research initiatives on anti-cancer drug development and is a life member of the National Academy of Sciences, India.

The Department of Biotechnology of the Government of India awarded him the National Bioscience Award for Career Development, one of the highest Indian science awards, for his contributions to biosciences, in 2012.

== Biography ==
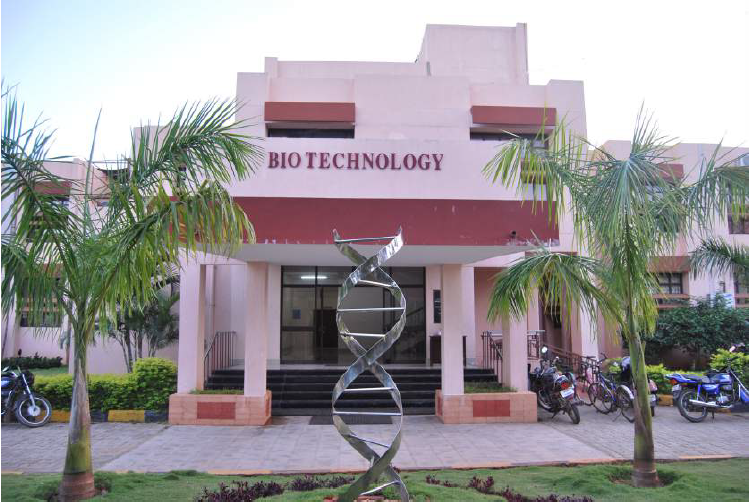
Department of Biotechnology - Pondicherry University

Durai Sundar, born in the south Indian state of Pondicherry, did his undergraduate and post-graduate studies as well as his doctoral studies at Pondicherry University and completed his post-doctoral work at Johns Hopkins University. Subsequently, he joined the Indian Institute of Technology, Delhi (IITD) as a member of faculty where he is an associate professor, holding the Dupont Young Professor chair. At IITD, he chairs Tryst, IIT Delhi and serves as an associate faculty at the School of Interdisciplinary Research and the Value Education Centre (NRCVEE). He also coordinates the Bioinformatics Centre, a project funded by the Department of Biotechnology and DaiLab, a collaborative biomedical initiative between IIT Delhi and the National Institute of Advanced Industrial Science and Technology (AIST, Japan).

== Professional profile ==
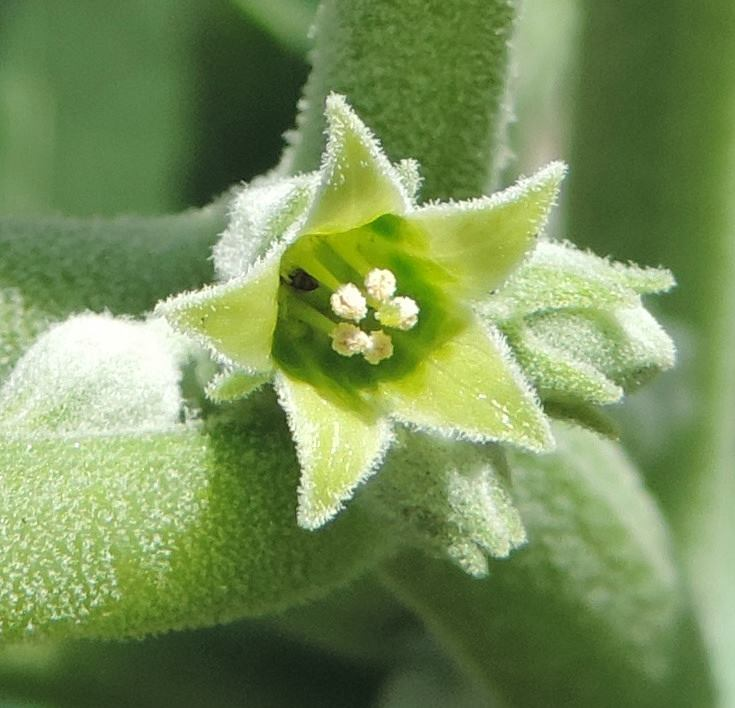
Ashwagandha flower

Sundar is known to have carried out research in the fields of genome editing tool designing, biological studies of natural drugs and metabolic engineering. When DaiLab was established at IIT Delhi, he became the coordinator of the initiative. He was a part of the team which studied the anti-cancer properties of Withania somnifera, commonly known as Ashwagandha, and the team identified withanolide, withaferin A, and withanone as the three steroidal contents of the plant which gives the property to it; they published their findings by way of an article published in Cell Death and Disease journal in 2017. His studies have been documented by way of a number of articles (Note: Please see Selected bibliography section) and ResearchGate, an online repository of scientific articles has listed 80 of them. Besides, he has contributed chapters to books published by others. He has also delivered invited speeches at international seminars and conferences which included the DAILAB PIKNIKH SERIES V seminar held at Tsukuba, Japan in 2015.

== Awards and honors ==
Sundar received the Swarna Jayanti Award of the National Academy of Sciences, India in 2005 and three honors in 2006, the Young Scientist Award and the Innovative Young Biotechnologist Award of the Department of Science and Technology as well as the Young Scientist Award of the Indian Science Congress Association. The Indian National Science Academy awarded him the INSA Medal for Young Scientists in 2008 and the Lady Tata Memorial Trust selected him for the Young Researcher Award in 2011; the same year as he was elected as a life member of the National Academy of Sciences, India. The Department of Biotechnology (DBT) of the Government of India awarded him the National Bioscience Award for Career Development, one of the highest Indian science awards in 2012. He received two more awards in 2013, the Young Scientist Award of the Asian Biophysics Association and the Prof. Umakant Sinha Memorial Award of the Indian Science Congress Association.

== Selected bibliography ==
=== Chapters ===
- Sunil C. Kaul; Renu Wadhwa (13 September 2017). Science of Ashwagandha: Preventive and Therapeutic Potentials. Springer. pp. 263–. ISBN 978-3-319-59192-6.
- Vikram Singh; Pawan K. Dhar (15 December 2014). Systems and Synthetic Biology. Springer. pp. 11–. ISBN 978-94-017-9514-2.

=== Articles ===
- Molparia, Bhuvan; Goyal, Kanav; Sarkar, Anita; Kumar, Sonu; Sundar, Durai (2010). "ZiF-Predict: A Web Tool for Predicting DNA-Binding Specificity in C2H2 Zinc Finger Proteins". Genomics, Proteomics & Bioinformatics. 8 (2): 122–126. doi:10.1016/s1672-0229(10)60013-7. PMC 5054441. PMID 20691397.
- Grover, Abhinav; Singh, Rumani; Shandilya, Ashutosh; Priyandoko, Didik; Agrawal, Vibhuti; Bisaria, Virendra S.; Wadhwa, Renu; Kaul, Sunil C.; Sundar, Durai (27 January 2012). "Ashwagandha Derived Withanone Targets TPX2-Aurora A Complex: Computational and Experimental Evidence to its Anticancer Activity". PLOS ONE. 7 (1) e30890. Bibcode:2012PLoSO...730890G. doi:10.1371/journal.pone.0030890. ISSN 1932-6203. PMC 3267739. PMID 22303466.
- Grover, Abhinav; Shandilya, Ashutosh; Agrawal, Vibhuti; Bisaria, Virendra S.; Sundar, Durai (2012). "Computational Evidence to Inhibition of Human Acetyl Cholinesterase by Withanolide A for Alzheimer Treatment". Journal of Biomolecular Structure and Dynamics. 29 (4): 651–662. doi:10.1080/07391102.2012.10507408. PMID 22208270. S2CID 44542170.

== See also ==
- DNA-binding domain
- Acetylcholinesterase
