= N. S. N. Nataraj =

Indian politician

Member of the Tamil Nadu Legislative Assembly
- Incumbent
- Assumed office 11 May 2026
- Preceded by: M. P. Saminathan
- Constituency: Kangayam
- In office 16 May 2011 – 19 May 2016
- Preceded by: S. Sekar
- Succeeded by: U. Thaniyarasu
- Constituency: Kangayam

Personal details
- Party: All India Anna Dravida Munnetra Kazhagam

N. S. N. Nataraj is an Indian politician and was a member of the Tamil Nadu Legislative Assembly from the Kangayam constituency in Fourteenth Assembly of Tamil Nadu from 2011-2016. He represents the Anna Dravida Munnetra Kazhagam party.

== Business ==
Nataraj is the former president of the Kangayam Coconut Oil Manufacturers Association, and co-owner of the NSN Group of Companies, alongside his son Dhanapal. The company is focused on manufacturing copra and coconut oil in Kangayam, and is the largest supplier of copra in the state.

== Personal life ==
He has Wife named Shanthi, Son NSN Dhanapal, Daughter Premalatha married to Prakash is a resident of Kangayam.
