= Kangayam Assembly constituency =

State Legislative Assembly Constituency in Tamil Nadu

Coordinates: 11.0054°N 77.5620°E

Kangayam
- Constituency No. 102 for the Tamil Nadu Legislative Assembly

Constituency details
- Country: India
- Region: South India
- State: Tamil Nadu
- District: Tiruppur
- Lok Sabha constituency: Erode
- Established: 1951
- Total electors: 2,19,586
- Reservation: None

Member of Legislative Assembly
- 17th Tamil Nadu Legislative Assembly
- Incumbent N. S. N. Nataraj
- Party: AIADMK
- Alliance: NDA
- Elected year: 2026

Kangayam is a state assembly constituency in Tiruppur district in Tamil Nadu. Its State Assembly Constituency number is 102. It consists of Kangayam taluk and a portion of Perundurai taluk. It falls under Erode Lok Sabha constituency. It is one of the 234 State Legislative Assembly Constituencies in Tamil Nadu, in India.

== Members of Legislative Assembly ==
=== Madras State ===
Year	Winner	Party
1952	A. K. Subbaraya Gounder	Indian National Congress
1953^{*}	K. G. Palanisamy Gounder	Independent
1957	K. G. Palanisamy Gounder	Indian National Congress
1962	K. S. Nataraja Gounder	Indian National Congress
1967	A. Senapathi Gounder	Indian National Congress

^{*}By election

=== Tamil Nadu ===
Year	Winner	Party
1971	Kovai Chezhiyan	Dravida Munnetra Kazhagam
1977	R. K. S. Dhanapandi	All India Anna Dravida Munnetra Kazhagam
1980	K. G. Krishnasamy	All India Anna Dravida Munnetra Kazhagam
1984	K. C. Palanisamy	All India Anna Dravida Munnetra Kazhagam
1989	P. Marappan	All India Anna Dravida Munnetra Kazhagam
1991	J. Jayalalithaa	All India Anna Dravida Munnetra Kazhagam
1991^	R. M. Veerappan	All India Anna Dravida Munnetra Kazhagam
1996	N. S. Rajkumar Manraadiar	Dravida Munnetra Kazhagam
2001	M. Selvi	All India Anna Dravida Munnetra Kazhagam
2006	Vidiyal Sehar	Indian National Congress
2011	N. S. N. Nataraj	All India Anna Dravida Munnetra Kazhagam
2016	U. Thaniyarasu	All India Anna Dravida Munnetra Kazhagam
2021	M. P. Saminathan	Dravida Munnetra Kazhagam
2026	N. S. N. Nataraj	All India Anna Dravida Munnetra Kazhagam

^ = by-election

== Election results ==
Vote share of winning candidates
2026	34.94%
2021	47.38%
2016	45.18%
2011	60.63%
2006	46.09%
2001	51.06%
1996	56.67%
1991 by-election	0.0%
1991	63.44%
1989	40.30%
1984	57.78%
1980	41.32%
1977	42.09%
1971	66.41%
1967	36.41%
1962	61.56%
1953 by-election	0.0%
1957	48.06%

=== 2026 ===
2026 Tamil Nadu Legislative Assembly election: Kangayam
Party	Candidate	Votes	%	±%
AIADMK	N. S. N. Nataraj	71,122	34.94	▼8.76
TVK	Mani Gounder	62,989	30.95	New
DMK	M.P. Saminathan	59,230	29.10	▼18.28
NTK	Karmegan.M	7,068	3.47	▼2.22
NOTA	NOTA	706	0.35	▼0.17
Party For The Rights Of Other Backward Classes	P. Thirugnanasambantham	499	0.25	New
Independent	P. Parthiban	312	0.15	New
Independent	R. Immanuvel	282	0.14	▼0.08
Independent	P. Mani	274	0.13	New
Independent	B. Rajendran	265	0.13	New
Independent	Palanisamy	203	0.10	New
Ganasangam Party of India	R. Vijayalakshmi	176	0.09	New
Independent	Karthikeyan	164	0.08	New
Independent	Gowtham	98	0.05	New
Margin of victory		8,133	3.99	▲0.30
Turnout		2,03,388	92.62	▲15.30
Registered electors		2,19,586		▼37,516
AIADMK gain from DMK		Swing	▼8.76	

=== 2021 ===
2021 Tamil Nadu Legislative Assembly election: Kangayam
Party	Candidate	Votes	%	±%
DMK	M. P. Saminathan	94,197	47.38	
AIADMK	A. S. Ramalingam	86,866	43.70	−1.48
NTK	K. Sivanantham	11,307	5.69	4.13
Independent	R. Appasamy	2,327	1.17	
NOTA	Nota	1,027	0.52	−1.19
AMMK	C. Ramesh	474	0.24	
Independent	R. Immanuvel	435	0.22	
BSP	N. Ayyavu	421	0.21	−0.40
Independent	R. Manikandan	330	0.17	
Independent	C. Nithiyandhan	285	0.14	
Independent	P. Nallamuthu	276	0.14	
Margin of victory		7,331	3.69	−3.43
Turnout		198,791	77.32	−1.57
Rejected ballots		558	0.28	
Registered electors		257,102		
DMK gain from AIADMK		Swing	2.20	

=== 2016 ===
2016 Tamil Nadu Legislative Assembly election: Kangayam
Party	Candidate	Votes	%	±%
AIADMK	U. Thaniyarasu	83,325	45.18	−15.45
INC	P. Gopi	70,190	38.06	3.80
DMDK	K. G. Muthuvenkateshwaran	12,108	6.57	
BJP	M. Ushadevi	7,161	3.88	2.69
NOTA	None Of The Above	3,141	1.70	
NTK	V. P. Shanmugam	2,871	1.56	
PMK	V. Amirtavalli	1,544	0.84	
BSP	G. Thangavel	1,136	0.62	−0.10
Independent	B. Rajendran	759	0.41	
IDMMK	Poovathal	519	0.28	
Independent	S. Kavinraja	369	0.20	
Margin of victory		13,135	7.12	−19.26
Turnout		184,428	78.89	−2.90
Registered electors		233,793		
AIADMK hold		Swing	-15.45	

=== 2011 ===
2011 Tamil Nadu Legislative Assembly election: Kangayam
Party	Candidate	Votes	%	±%
AIADMK	N. S. N. Nataraj	96,005	60.63	20.45
INC	S. Videyal Sekar	54,240	34.26	−11.83
BJP	C. Ponnusamy	1,884	1.19	
Independent	N. Rajamanickam	1,802	1.14	
Independent	P. K. Periyasamy	1,165	0.74	
BSP	K. Perumal	1,129	0.71	−0.16
Independent	V. Krishna Moorthi	525	0.33	
Independent	R. Ramasamy	464	0.29	
Independent	P. Chellamuthu	427	0.27	
Independent	N. Sukumaran	388	0.25	
Independent	M. R. Mani	309	0.20	
Margin of victory		41,765	26.38	20.47
Turnout		193,597	81.79	5.79
Registered electors		158,338		
AIADMK gain from INC		Swing	14.54	

=== 2006 ===
2006 Tamil Nadu Legislative Assembly election: Kangayam
Party	Candidate	Votes	%	±%
INC	S. Sekar	56,946	46.09	
AIADMK	N. M. S. Palaniswami	49,650	40.18	−10.88
DMDK	P. Kumarasamy	11,354	9.19	
JD(U)	K. Subramaniyam	1,883	1.52	
Independent	P. Rajendran	1,443	1.17	
BSP	K. Perumal	1,081	0.87	
Independent	K. Palanisamy	665	0.54	
Independent	M. Sekar	292	0.24	
Independent	S. Kamatchidevi	245	0.20	
Margin of victory		7,296	5.90	−3.90
Turnout		123,559	75.99	10.61
Registered electors		162,590		
INC gain from AIADMK		Swing	-4.97	

=== 2001 ===
2001 Tamil Nadu Legislative Assembly election: Kangayam
Party	Candidate	Votes	%	±%
AIADMK	M. Selvi	58,700	51.06	17.49
DMK	N. S. Rajkumar Manraadiar	47,426	41.25	−15.42
MDMK	S. Jagadesan	4,777	4.16	−2.50
Independent	S. Venkataramanan	1,797	1.56	
Independent	P. Raju	677	0.59	
Independent	P. Sampath	422	0.37	
Independent	V. P. Periasamy	317	0.28	
Independent	P. M. Karthikeyan	233	0.20	
Independent	A. K. Krishnan	229	0.20	
Independent	M. Thangamani	207	0.18	
Independent	R. Chinnasamy	177	0.15	
Margin of victory		11,274	9.81	−13.30
Turnout		114,962	65.38	−3.73
Registered electors		175,834		
AIADMK gain from DMK		Swing	-5.61	

=== 1996 ===
1996 Tamil Nadu Legislative Assembly election: Kangayam
Party	Candidate	Votes	%	±%
DMK	N. S. Rajkumar Manraadiar	63,801	56.67	▲56.67
AIADMK	N. Ramasamy	37,792	33.57	▼63
MDMK	K. Periyasamy	7,497	6.66	New
BJP	M. S. Venkatachalam	816	0.72	New
Independent	A. P. Chinnasamy Gounder	353	0.31	
Independent	M. Chandrasekaran	337	0.30	
Independent	N. Ramasamy	276	0.25	
Independent	M. Mani @ Manian	271	0.24	
Independent	M. P. Chandran	201	0.18	
Independent	K. R. Rajan	195	0.17	
Independent	C. Loganathan	166	0.15	
Margin of victory		26,009	23.10	−7.48
Turnout		112,575	69.11	−1.47
Registered electors		167,708		
DMK gain from AIADMK		Swing	-6.76	

=== 1991 by-election ===
1991 Tamil Nadu By-election: Kangayam
Party	Candidate	Votes	%	±%
AIADMK	R. M. Veerappan	98,783	96.57	▲33.13
Independent	Amnachalam.C.S	1,072	1.05	New
Independent	R.S.Pon	800	0.78	New
Independent	G.Murthy	420	0.41	New
Independent	Palanisamy.P.N	136	0.13	New
Independent	Veerappan.V.T.R	131	0.13	New
Independent	Gurusamy.R	129	0.13	New
Independent	Rajendran.M.L.G.K	108	0.11	New
Independent	K.Pandian.T.K	90	0.09	New
Independent	J.Kumari	85	0.08	New
Independent	C.Vathiyarv	78	0.08	New
Margin of victory		97,711	95.52	
Turnout		1,02,297		
AIADMK hold		Swing		

=== 1991 ===
1991 Tamil Nadu Legislative Assembly election: Kangayam
Party	Candidate	Votes	%	±%
AIADMK	J. Jayalalithaa	69,050	63.44	23.14
DMK	N. S. Rajkumar Manraadiar	35,759	32.85	−0.39
PMK	V. P. Chandramohan	623	0.57	
Independent	A. P. Chinnasamy	435	0.40	
THMM	A. K. Krishnan	379	0.35	
Independent	P. K. Mohammed	271	0.25	
Independent	P. Ponnusamy	238	0.22	
Independent	N. Subramaniam	190	0.17	
Independent	K. S. Mani	186	0.17	
Independent	N. C. Shanmugam	150	0.14	
Independent	P. M. Palanisamy	126	0.12	
Margin of victory		33,291	30.58	23.53
Turnout		108,849	70.58	−4.44
Registered electors		160,773		
AIADMK hold		Swing	23.14	

=== 1989 ===
1989 Tamil Nadu Legislative Assembly election: Kangayam
Party	Candidate	Votes	%	±%
AIADMK	P. Marappan	43,834	40.30	−17.49
DMK	P. Rathingamy	36,163	33.25	−6.69
INC	K. Chinnasamy Gr	21,259	19.54	
AIADMK	Appu Alias Chinnasamy	4,002	3.68	−54.11
Independent	P. Krishnasamy	962	0.88	
Independent	N. G. Sivasabapathy	477	0.44	
Independent	Aruchamy	453	0.42	
Independent	P. Ponusamy	292	0.27	
Independent	Koladan Alias Kolandasamy	277	0.25	
Independent	Rasendiran	251	0.23	
Independent	Sahdevan	183	0.17	
Margin of victory		7,671	7.05	−10.80
Turnout		108,776	75.02	−1.12
Registered electors		148,106		
AIADMK hold		Swing	-17.49	

=== 1984 ===
1984 Tamil Nadu Legislative Assembly election: Kangayam
Party	Candidate	Votes	%	±%
AIADMK	K. C. Palanisamy	54,252	57.78	16.47
DMK	M. Sivasabapathy	37,495	39.94	9.06
Independent	K. Namasivayam	921	0.98	
Independent	Chinnasmay	882	0.94	
Independent	Arumugham	337	0.36	
Margin of victory		16,757	17.85	7.41
Turnout		93,887	76.14	5.72
Registered electors		130,059		
AIADMK hold		Swing	16.47	

=== 1980 ===
1980 Tamil Nadu Legislative Assembly election: Kangayam
Party	Candidate	Votes	%	±%
AIADMK	K. G. Krishnaswamy	45,950	41.32	−0.78
DMK	M. Sivasabapathi	34,341	30.88	6.29
Independent	K. J. Subbaramaniam	826	0.74	
Independent	C. Chenniappan	471	0.42	
Independent	P. Murugesan	326	0.29	
Margin of victory		11,609	10.44	−7.07
Turnout		111,215	70.42	9.38
Registered electors		159,871		
AIADMK hold		Swing	-0.78	

=== 1977 ===
1977 Tamil Nadu Legislative Assembly election: Kangayam
Party	Candidate	Votes	%	±%
AIADMK	R. K. S. Dhandapani	31,665	42.09	
DMK	M. Sivasabapathy	18,498	24.59	−41.81
INC	K. G. Subbiah Gounder	15,935	21.18	
JP	M. Arjunan	6,883	9.15	
Independent	K. J. Subramaniam	1,412	1.88	
Independent	M. Nachimuthu	830	1.10	
Margin of victory		13,167	17.50	−16.97
Turnout		75,223	61.04	−10.23
Registered electors		125,068		
AIADMK gain from DMK		Swing	-24.31	

=== 1971 ===
1971 Tamil Nadu Legislative Assembly election: Kangayam
Party	Candidate	Votes	%	±%
DMK	Kovai Chezhiyan	42,461	66.41	30.21
Independent	K. G. Palanisamy Gounder	20,419	31.93	
Independent	Raman	1,062	1.66	
Margin of victory		22,042	34.47	34.26
Turnout		63,942	71.27	−6.33
Registered electors		95,885		
DMK gain from INC		Swing	30.00	

=== 1967 ===
1967 Madras Legislative Assembly election: Kangayam
Party	Candidate	Votes	%	±%
INC	A. Senapathi Gounder	24,800	36.41	−25.15
DMK	Velusami	24,654	36.19	−0.90
CPI	N. K. Palaniswamy	17,691	25.97	
Independent	K. Gounder	974	1.43	
Margin of victory		146	0.21	−24.25
Turnout		68,119	77.59	4.40
Registered electors		93,288		
INC hold		Swing	-25.15	

=== 1962 ===
1962 Madras Legislative Assembly election: Kangayam
Party	Candidate	Votes	%	±%
INC	K. S. Nataraja Gounder	41,006	61.56	13.49
DMK	M. Palanisamy Gounder	24,711	37.10	
PSP	N. Lingasamy Gounder	898	1.35	
Margin of victory		16,295	24.46	3.73
Turnout		66,615	73.20	34.82
Registered electors		93,651		
INC hold		Swing	13.49	

=== 1957 ===
1957 Madras Legislative Assembly election: Kangayam
Party	Candidate	Votes	%	±%
INC	K. G. Palaniswamy Gounder	17,952	48.06	
Independent	P. Muthuswamy Gounder	10,209	27.33	
Independent	V. Mutuiswamy Gounder	9,189	24.60	
Margin of victory		7,743	20.73	
Turnout		37,350	38.37	
Registered electors		97,337		
INC hold		Swing		

=== 1952 ===
1952 Madras Legislative Assembly election: Kangayam
Party	Candidate	Votes	%	±%
INC	A. K. Subbaraya Gounder	Unopposed		
Registered electors		67,808		
INC win (new seat)				
