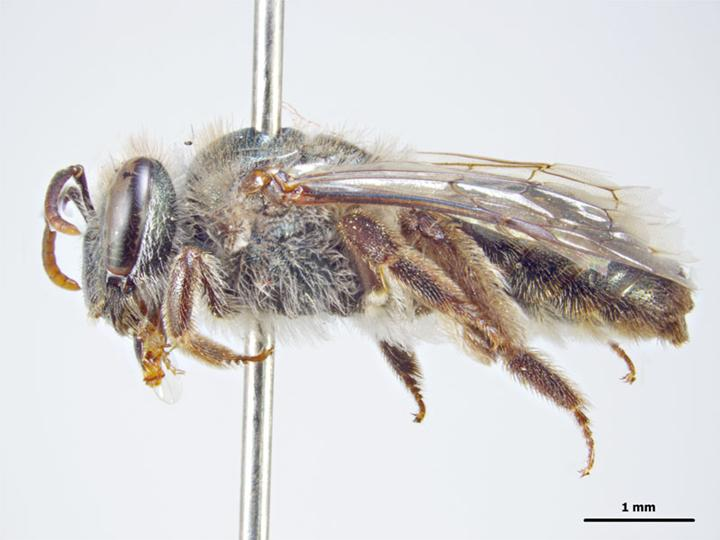
- Female

Scientific classification
- Kingdom: Animalia
- Phylum: Arthropoda
- Clade: Pancrustacea
- Class: Insecta
- Order: Hymenoptera
- Family: Colletidae
- Genus: Leioproctus
- Species: L. plumosus

Binomial name
- Leioproctus plumosus (Smith, 1853)

Synonyms
- Lamprocolletes plumosus Smith, 1853; Lamprocolletes bicolor Smith, 1879; Lamprocolletes metallicus Smith, 1879; Paracolletes eucalypti Cockerell, 1916

= Leioproctus plumosus =

Species of bee

Leioproctus plumosus, or Leioproctus (Leioproctus) plumosus, is a species of bee in the family Colletidae and subfamily Colletinae. It is endemic to Australia. It was described by English entomologist Frederick Smith in 1853.

== Distribution and habitat ==
The species occurs across southern Australia. Type localities include Swan River in Western Australia and Mount Yule near Healesville in Victoria.

== Behaviour ==
The adults are flying mellivores. Flowering plants visited by the bees include Acacia, Daviesia, Eucalyptus, Leucopogon and Salpichroa species.

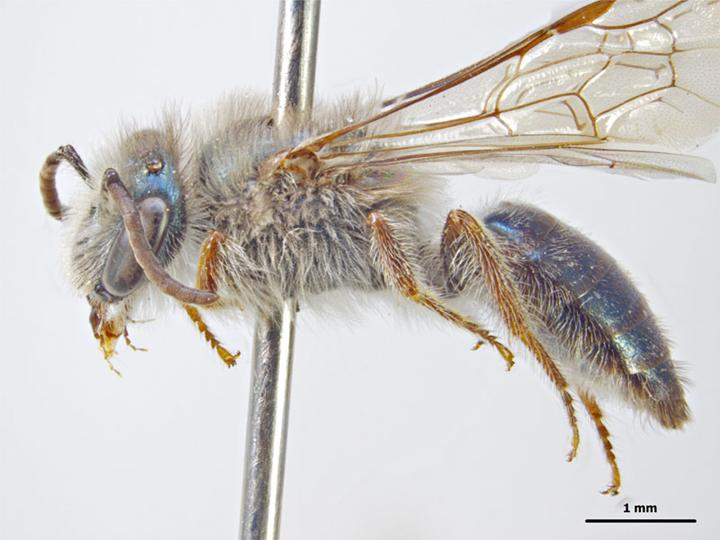
Male
