= Withania adunensis =

Conservation status
- Least Concern (IUCN 3.1)

Scientific classification
- Kingdom: Plantae
- Clade: Tracheophytes
- Clade: Angiosperms
- Clade: Eudicots
- Clade: Asterids
- Order: Solanales
- Family: Solanaceae
- Genus: Withania
- Species: W. adunensis

Binomial name
- Withania adunensis Vierh. (1906)

Species of flowering plant

Withania adunensis is a species of plant in the family Solanaceae. It is a shrub endemic to the island of Socotra in Yemen. It is widespread in succulent shrubland and drought deciduous woodland from sea level to 650 metres elevation.

It closely resembles Withania riebeckii.
