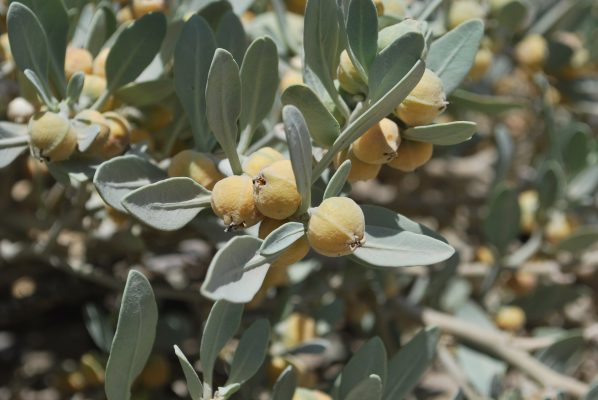

Scientific classification
- Kingdom: Plantae
- Clade: Tracheophytes
- Clade: Angiosperms
- Clade: Eudicots
- Clade: Asterids
- Order: Solanales
- Family: Solanaceae
- Genus: Withania
- Species: W. coagulans

Binomial name
- Withania coagulans (Stocks) Dunal

Synonyms
- Puneeria coagulans Stocks

= Withania coagulans =

Species of flowering plant

Withania coagulans ( Sanskrit: ऋष्यगंधा, Rishyagandha; Urdu: پنیر بوٹی, Paneer booti; پنیر ڈوڈا, paneer doddi; تخم حیات, tukhme hayat; Tamil: Panneer ilai chedi, Hindi: पनीर के फूल, Paneer phool, Pashto: شاپیانگا/مخازور) is a plant in the Solanaceae or nightshade family, native to Afghanistan and the Indian subcontinent. Within the genus Withania, W. somnifera (Ashwagandha) and W. coagulans (Paneer doddi/Ashutosh booti) are economically significant, and are cultivated in several regions for their use in Ayurveda. It is claimed to help control diabetes. The berries contain a rennet-like protease that can be used to clot milk for cheese production. The plant is prone to leaf spot disease caused by Alternaria alternata.
