= Withania qaraitica =

Scientific classification
- Kingdom: Plantae
- Clade: Tracheophytes
- Clade: Angiosperms
- Clade: Eudicots
- Clade: Asterids
- Order: Solanales
- Family: Solanaceae
- Subfamily: Solanoideae
- Tribe: Physaleae
- Genus: Withania
- Species: W. qaraitica

Binomial name
- Withania qaraitica A.G.Mill. & Biagi

Species of shrub

Withania qaraitica is a shrubby and perennial herb up to 1 m (3 ft 3 in) tall with bright orange-red seeds patterned with honeycomb-like markings pale yellowish brown in color. It has only been found in Dhofar, but may occur in wet woodlands over the border in south Yemen. It is closely related to two species, Withania adunenis and W. riebeckii. W. qaraitica occurs commonly in the wet woodlands, but can be found around settlements where they have frequently been transplanted.
