= Dharma Durai =

Dharma Durai may refer to:

- Dharma Durai (1991 film), an Indian Tamil-language action drama film
- Dharma Durai (2016 film), an Indian Tamil-language coming-of-age drama film

== See also ==
- Dharma (disambiguation)
- Durai (disambiguation)
