= M. P. Saminathan =

Indian politician

Minister of Information and Publicity Government of Tamil Nadu
- In office 7 May 2021 – 5 May 2026
- Chief Minister: M. K. Stalin
- Preceded by: Kadambur Raju

Minister of Highways and Minor Ports Government of Tamil Nadu
- In office 12 May 2006 – 16 May 2011
- Chief Minister: M. Karunanidhi
- Preceded by: O. Panneerselvam
- Succeeded by: Edappadi Palaniswami

Member of Tamil Nadu legislative assembly for Vellakoil (state assembly constituency)
- In office 14 May 1996 – 16 May 2011

Member of Tamil Nadu legislative assembly for Kangayam (state assembly constituency)
- In office 2 May 2021 – 4 May 2026
- Preceded by: U. Thaniyarasu
- Succeeded by: N. S. N. Nataraj

Youth wing Secretary of Dravida Munnetra Kazhagam
- In office 7 July 2017 – 4 July 2019
- Preceded by: M. K. Stalin
- Succeeded by: Udhayanidhi Stalin

Personal details
- Born: Muthur Perumal Gounder Saminathan Muthur
- Occupation: Politician

Muthur Perumal Gounder Saminathan is the Minister for Information & Publicity in the 16th Legislative Assembly of Tamil Nadu. He was the Minister for Highways and Minor Ports in Tamil Nadu in the 13th Legislative Assembly (2006 - 2011).

He was born in Erode and his hometown is Muthur, Tiruppur District. He holds a Bachelor of Arts degree from PSG College of Arts & Science, Coimbatore.

He had a hat-trick assembly win in 1996, 2001 and 2006 from the Vellakoil Constituency. Vellakoil Constituency was announced as defunct for the 2011 elections. In 2011 and 2016 he had to change his constituency and lost in both the elections. In 2021, he emerged as a winner from the Kangayam Constituency.

He started his political career at a very young age. He first became an MLA in 1996 by defeating the former minister Durai Ramasamy. Saminathan was only 32 years old at that time.
