= Paramathi-Velur Assembly constituency =

State Legislative Assembly Constituency in Tamil Nadu

Coordinates: 11.16°N 78.02°E

Paramathi-Velur
- Constituency No. 95 for the Tamil Nadu Legislative Assembly

Constituency details
- Country: India
- Region: South India
- State: Tamil Nadu
- District: Namakkal
- Lok Sabha constituency: Namakkal
- Established: 2008
- Total electors: 2,05,215

Member of Legislative Assembly
- 17th Tamil Nadu Legislative Assembly
- Incumbent S. Sekar
- Party: AIADMK
- Alliance: NDA
- Elected year: 2026

Paramathi-Velur is a state assembly constituency in Tamil Nadu, India that was formed after constituency delimitations in 2008. Its State Assembly Constituency number is 95. It consists of Paramathi-Velur taluk and portions of Tiruchengodu and Namakkal taluks. It forms a part of Namakkal Lok Sabha constituency. It is one of the 234 State Legislative Assembly Constituencies in Tamil Nadu in India.

== Members of Legislative Assembly ==
Year	Winner	Party
2011	U. Thaniyarasu	All India Anna Dravida Munnetra Kazhagam
2016	K. S. Moorthiy	Dravida Munnetra Kazhagam
2021	S. Sekar	All India Anna Dravida Munnetra Kazhagam
2026	S. Sekar	All India Anna Dravida Munnetra Kazhagam

== Election results ==
Vote share of winning candidates
2026	32.49%
2021	47.08%
2016	42.45%
2011	54.50%

=== 2026 ===
2026 Tamil Nadu Legislative Assembly election: Paramathi-Velur
Party	Candidate	Votes	%	±%
AIADMK	Sekar S	61,349	32.49	▼14.59
DMK	Moorthiy K S	61,041	32.32	▼10.57
TVK	Nandakumar A	56,067	29.69	New
NTK	Aravind M	5,727	3.03	▼3.36
NOTA	NOTA	449	0.24	▼0.29
Margin of victory		308	0.17	▼4.02
Turnout		1,88,275	91.75	▲9.29
Registered electors		2,05,215		▼16,387
AIADMK hold		Swing	▼14.59	

=== 2021 ===
2021 Tamil Nadu Legislative Assembly election: Paramathi-Velur
Party	Candidate	Votes	%	±%
AIADMK	S. Sekar	86,034	47.08%	+5.1
DMK	K. S. Moorthiy	78,372	42.89%	+0.44
NTK	K. Uvarani	11,684	6.39%	+5.46
MNM	K. Natarajan	1,882	1.03%	New
NOTA	NOTA	964	0.53%	−0.42
AMMK	P. P. Saminathan	1,329	0.73%	New
Margin of victory		7,662	+4.19%	+4.66%
Turnout		182,733	82.46%	−1.57%
Rejected ballots		168	0.09%	
Registered electors		221,602		
AIADMK gain from DMK		Swing	0.44%	

=== 2016 ===
2016 Tamil Nadu Legislative Assembly election: Paramathi-Velur
Party	Candidate	Votes	%	±%
DMK	K. S. Moorthiy	74,418	42.45%	New
AIADMK	R. Rajendhiran	73,600	41.98%	−12.52
DMDK	K. Muthukumar	6,014	3.43%	New
KMDK	C. Boopathi	5,116	2.92%	New
BJP	S. Rajkumar	4,323	2.47%	+1.06
PMK	N. Ramesh	3,740	2.13%	−31.92
NOTA	NOTA	1,658	0.95%	New
NTK	G. Deivasigamani	1,643	0.94%	New
Independent	R. Periasamy	1,134	0.65%	New
Margin of victory		818	0.47%	−19.98%
Turnout		175,306	84.03%	2.77%
Registered electors		208,633		
DMK gain from AIADMK		Swing	-12.05%	

=== 2011 ===
2011 Tamil Nadu Legislative Assembly election: Paramathi-Velur
Party	Candidate	Votes	%	±%
AIADMK	U.Thaniyarasu	82,682	54.50%	New
PMK	C. Vadivel	51,664	34.06%	New
Independent	V. Vaithiyanathan	6,233	4.11%	New
BJP	K. Manoharan	2,140	1.41%	New
Independent	A. Sivasankar	2,012	1.33%	New
Independent	P. Gopal	1,527	1.01%	New
IJK	M. Thangadurai	1,447	0.95%	New
Independent	S. R. Balasubramaniam	911	0.60%	New
Margin of victory		31,018	20.45%	
Turnout		151,705	81.26%	
Registered electors		186,699		
AIADMK win (new seat)				
