= Withania chevalieri =

Conservation status
- Critically Endangered (IUCN 3.1)

Scientific classification
- Kingdom: Plantae
- Clade: Tracheophytes
- Clade: Angiosperms
- Clade: Eudicots
- Clade: Asterids
- Order: Solanales
- Family: Solanaceae
- Genus: Withania
- Species: W. chevalieri

Binomial name
- Withania chevalieri A.E.Goncalves

Species of plant

Withania chevalieri is a species of flowering plants of the family Solanaceae. The species is endemic to Cape Verde and is listed as critically endangered by the IUCN. The specific name refers to the French botanist Auguste Chevalier.

== Distribution ==
The species is restricted to the islands of Santo Antão, Sal and Fogo. The plant is found from sea level up to 700 metres elevation.
