= Vellakoil Assembly constituency =

Coordinates: 10.93°N 77.72°E

Vellakoil
- Former constituency for the Tamil Nadu Legislative Assembly

Constituency details
- Country: India
- Region: South India
- State: Tamil Nadu
- District: Erode
- Established: 1967
- Abolished: 2008
- Total electors: 1,55,431
- Reservation: None

Vellakoil was one of the 234 constituencies in the Tamil Nadu Legislative Assembly of Tamil Nadu, a southern state of India. It was in Erode district.

== Members of the Legislative Assembly ==
Year	Winner	Party
Madras State
1967	K. N. Saminatha Gounder or Kuttappalayam Swaminathan	Dravida Munnetra Kazhagam
Tamil Nadu
1971	M. Palanisamy	Dravida Munnetra Kazhagam
1977	D. Ramasamy	Indian National Congress
1980	D. Ramasamy	All India Anna Dravida Munnetra Kazhagam
1984	Durai Ramasamy	All India Anna Dravida Munnetra Kazhagam
1989	Durai Ramasamy	Anna Dravida Munnetra Kazhagam (Jayalalitha)
1991	Durai Ramasamy	All India Anna Dravida Munnetra Kazhagam
1996	M. P. Saminathan	Dravida Munnetra Kazhagam
2001	M. P. Saminathan	Dravida Munnetra Kazhagam
2006	M. P. Saminathan	Dravida Munnetra Kazhagam

== Election results ==
Vote share of winning candidates
2006	51.79%
2001	32.99%
1996	49.37%
1991	62.85%
1989	37.52%
1984	55.82%
1980	62.63%
1977	37.69%
1971	68.10%
1967	62.44%

=== 2006 ===
2006 Tamil Nadu Legislative Assembly election: Vellakoil
Party	Candidate	Votes	%	±%
DMK	M. P. Saminathan	60,909	51.79%	18.80%
MDMK	A. Ganeshamurthi	43,821	37.26%	33.71%
DMDK	Jaganathan. P	6,400	5.44%	
Independent	Vengatesh. S.	1,302	1.11%	
BJP	Suriyamoorthi. S	1,021	0.87%	
Independent	Selvaraj. Pon.	906	0.77%	
Independent	Chellamuthu. P.	853	0.73%	
Independent	Annamalai. V.	498	0.42%	
JD(U)	Selvi. L	478	0.41%	
Independent	Arumugam. K.	246	0.21%	
Independent	Sugumaran. N.	235	0.20%	
Margin of victory		17,088	14.53%	13.88%
Turnout		1,17,618	75.67%	8.88%
Registered electors		1,55,431		
DMK hold		Swing	18.80%	

=== 2001 ===
2001 Tamil Nadu Legislative Assembly election: Vellakoil
Party	Candidate	Votes	%	±%
DMK	M. P. Saminathan	37,571	32.99%	−16.38%
AIADMK	Periasamy. V. P.	36,831	32.34%	−11.09%
Independent	Durai Ramasamy	32,056	28.14%	
MDMK	Shanmugam . V. N.	4,045	3.55%	−2.94%
Independent	Palanisamy	1,611	1.41%	
Independent	Sudharsan	1,090	0.96%	
Independent	Suburathinam. N	696	0.61%	
Margin of victory		740	0.65%	−5.29%
Turnout		1,13,900	66.80%	−6.81%
Registered electors		1,70,584		
DMK hold		Swing	-16.38%	

=== 1996 ===
1996 Tamil Nadu Legislative Assembly election: Vellakoil
Party	Candidate	Votes	%	±%
DMK	M. P. Saminathan	57,467	49.37%	13.77%
AIADMK	Durai Ramaswamy	50,553	43.43%	−19.42%
MDMK	Shanmugam. V. N.	7,561	6.50%	
Independent	Nallamuthu. K.	238	0.20%	
Independent	Chellamuthu. M. S.	133	0.11%	
Independent	Manickam. C.	131	0.11%	
Independent	Madhiyalagan. S. K.	122	0.10%	
Independent	Selvaraj. V.	113	0.10%	
Independent	Thangavel. V.	53	0.05%	
Independent	Elavarasan. A. R.	36	0.03%	
Margin of victory		6,914	5.94%	−21.32%
Turnout		1,16,407	73.61%	2.90%
Registered electors		1,63,720		
DMK gain from AIADMK		Swing	-13.48%	

=== 1991 ===
1991 Tamil Nadu Legislative Assembly election: Vellakoil
Party	Candidate	Votes	%	±%
AIADMK	Durai Ramasamy	68,225	62.85%	25.32%
DMK	Subbulakshmi Jegadeesan	38,638	35.59%	2.89%
PMK	Sundarraj K.	822	0.76%	
THMM	Selvanayagam M.	531	0.49%	
Independent	Sivakumar P.	155	0.14%	
Independent	Krishnakumar S.	97	0.09%	
Independent	Vijayakumar C.	88	0.08%	
Margin of victory		29,587	27.26%	22.44%
Turnout		1,08,556	70.71%	−7.65%
Registered electors		1,57,927		
AIADMK hold		Swing	25.32%	

=== 1989 ===
1989 Tamil Nadu Legislative Assembly election: Vellakoil
Party	Candidate	Votes	%	±%
AIADMK	Durai Ramasamy	41,914	37.52%	−18.30%
DMK	Ramasamy. V.V.	36,534	32.71%	−11.47%
INC	Karvendan. S.K.	21,447	19.20%	
AIADMK	Appan M. Palanisamy	9,388	8.40%	−47.42%
Independent	Palanisamy. M.S.	761	0.68%	
Independent	Kumarasamy	357	0.32%	
Independent	Nallamuthu. K.	275	0.25%	
Independent	Kannappan. R.	249	0.22%	
Independent	Sukumauran. N.	222	0.20%	
Independent	Ponnusamy. S.	155	0.14%	
Independent	Themanaicker	136	0.12%	
Margin of victory		5,380	4.82%	−6.83%
Turnout		1,11,700	78.36%	0.13%
Registered electors		1,44,979		
AIADMK hold		Swing	-18.30%	

=== 1984 ===
1984 Tamil Nadu Legislative Assembly election: Vellakoil
Party	Candidate	Votes	%	±%
AIADMK	Durai Ramasamy	54,188	55.82%	−6.80%
DMK	Appan Palanisamy	42,881	44.18%	
Margin of victory		11,307	11.65%	−10.46%
Turnout		97,069	78.23%	4.90%
Registered electors		1,29,410		
AIADMK hold		Swing	-6.80%	

=== 1980 ===
1980 Tamil Nadu Legislative Assembly election: Vellakoil
Party	Candidate	Votes	%	±%
AIADMK	Durai Ramasami	56,975	62.63%	38.54%
INC	Nallasenapathy Sakkarai Mandradiar. N.	32,024	35.20%	−2.48%
Independent	Nallamuthu. N.	1,233	1.36%	
Independent	Lingasamy Gounder. K. N.	740	0.81%	
Margin of victory		20,116	22.11%	9.56%
Turnout		90,972	73.33%	7.30%
Registered electors		1,26,161		
AIADMK gain from INC		Swing	24.94%	

=== 1977 ===
1977 Tamil Nadu Legislative Assembly election: Vellakoil
Party	Candidate	Votes	%	±%
INC	D. Ramaswamy	30,996	37.69%	
DMK	M. Palanisamy	20,676	25.14%	−42.96%
AIADMK	V.K. Kalaimani	19,816	24.09%	
JP	S. Ramaswamy Nambiyar	8,306	10.10%	
Independent	K.A. Nallamuthu	1,365	1.66%	
Independent	K.N. Linkasamy Gounder	1,089	1.32%	
Margin of victory		10,320	12.55%	−29.28%
Turnout		82,248	66.02%	−1.52%
Registered electors		1,26,181		
INC gain from DMK		Swing	-30.41%	

=== 1971 ===
1971 Tamil Nadu Legislative Assembly election: Vellakoil
Party	Candidate	Votes	%	±%
DMK	Appan Mu. Palanisamy	42,067	68.10%	5.66%
Independent	S. M. Ramaswamy Gounder	16,231	26.28%	
Independent	K. Kuppusamy Gounder	2,780	4.50%	
Independent	K. N. Lingasamy Gounder	694	1.12%	
Margin of victory		25,836	41.82%	15.46%
Turnout		61,772	67.54%	−12.11%
Registered electors		99,783		
DMK hold		Swing	5.66%	

=== 1967 ===
1967 Madras Legislative Assembly election: Vellakoil
Party	Candidate	Votes	%	±%
DMK	K. N. Samynathan	46,009	62.44%	
INC	Durai Periyasamy Gounder	26,578	36.07%	
Independent	L. Gounder	1,101	1.49%	
Margin of victory		19,431	26.37%	
Turnout		73,688	79.65%	
Registered electors		96,405		
DMK win (new seat)				
