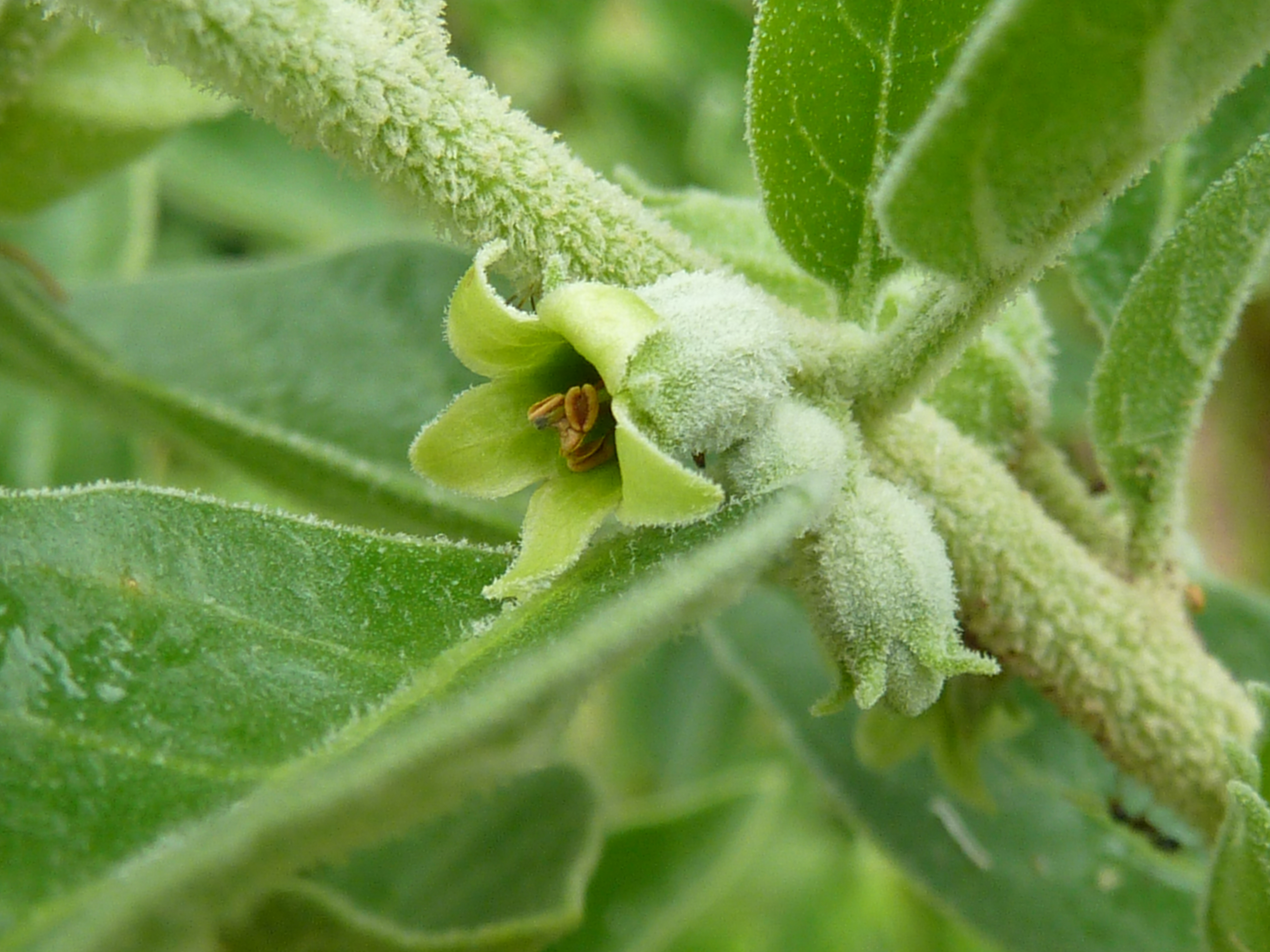
- Withania somnifera

Scientific classification
- Kingdom: Plantae
- Clade: Tracheophytes
- Clade: Angiosperms
- Clade: Eudicots
- Clade: Asterids
- Order: Solanales
- Family: Solanaceae
- Subfamily: Solanoideae
- Tribe: Physaleae
- Genus: Withania; Pauquy (1825), nom. cons.

Species
- 19; see text

Synonyms
- Archiphysalis Kuang (1966); Hypnoticum Rodati ex Meisn. (1839); Opsago Raf. (1838); Physaliastrum Makino (1914); Physaloides Moench (1794); Puneeria Stocks (1849); Scleromphalos Griff. (1854), nom. nud.

= Withania =

Genus of flowering plants

Withania is a genus of flowering plants in the nightshade family, Solanaceae, with 19 to 23 species that are native to parts of North Africa, western Asia, south Asia, southern Europe, the Mediterranean, and the Canary Islands. Withania was initially included within Physalis by Linnaeus in 1753 but has since become its own genus. This grouping was due to the shared feature of an inflated calyx that surrounds and protects the fruit.

Two of the species, W. somnifera (ashwagandha) and W. coagulans (ashutosh booti), are economically significant, and are cultivated in several regions for their medicinal uses.

== Etymology ==
Withania is thought to have been named in honour of Henry Witham, a British geologist and writer on fossil botany beginning in 1830.

== Species ==
19 species are accepted.

- Withania adpressa Coss. ex Batt.
- Withania adunensis Vierh.
- Withania aristata (Aiton) Pauquy
- Withania chamaesarachoides (Makino) Hunz.
- Withania coagulans (Stocks) Dunal — ashutosh booti, Indian rennet, panirband, vegetable rennet
- Withania echinata (Yatabe) Hunz.
- Withania frutescens (L.) Pauquy
- Withania grisea (Hepper & Boulos) Thulin
- Withania heterophylla (Hemsl.) Hunz.
- Withania japonica (Franch. & Sav.) Hunz.
- Withania kweichouensis (Kuang & A.M.Lu) Hunz.
- Withania qaraitica A.G.Mill. & Biagi
- Withania reichenbachii Bitter
- Withania riebeckii Schweinf.
- Withania sinensis (Hemsl.) Hunz.
- Withania sinica (Kuang & A.M.Lu) Hunz.
- Withania somnifera (L.) Dunal (synonym Withania chevalieri A.E.Gonç.) — ashwaganda, Indian ginseng, winter cherry
- Withania sphaerocarpa Hepper & Boulos
- Withania yunnanensis (Kuang & A.M.Lu) Hunz.
