= U. Thaniyarasu =

Indian politician

Member of Tamil Nadu Legislative Assembly
- In office 25 May 2016 – 11 May 2021
- Preceded by: N. S. N. Nataraj
- Succeeded by: M. P. Saminathan
- Constituency: Kangayam
- In office 23 May 2011 – 21 May 2016
- Preceded by: constituency established
- Succeeded by: K. S. Moorthyi
- Constituency: Paramathi-Velur

Personal details
- Born: Dharapuram, Tiruppur, Tamil Nadu
- Spouse: Umarani
- Parent(s): Udaiyappa Gounder, Palaniyammaal
- Occupation: Politics & Agriculture

U. Thaniyarasu is politician and, as of 2011, was a Member of the Tamil Nadu Legislative Assembly from the Paramathi Velur constituency. He represents the alliance with AIADMK.

Since May 2016, he has been a Member of the Tamil Nadu Legislative Assembly from the Kangayam constituency.
