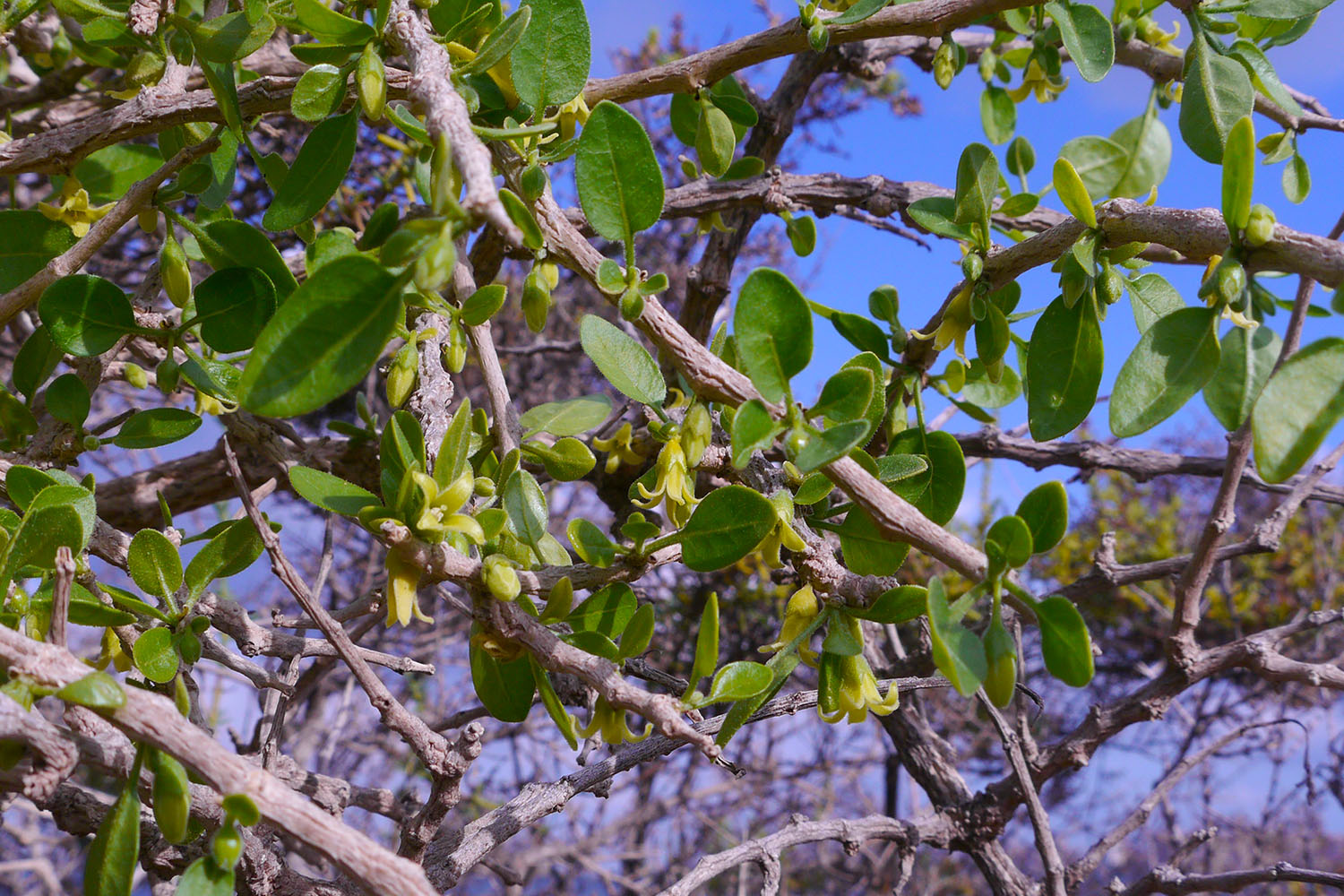

Scientific classification
- Kingdom: Plantae
- Clade: Tracheophytes
- Clade: Angiosperms
- Clade: Eudicots
- Clade: Asterids
- Order: Solanales
- Family: Solanaceae
- Genus: Withania
- Species: W. frutescens

Binomial name
- Withania frutescens (L.) Pauquy

Synonyms
- Atropa frutescens L.

= Withania frutescens =

Species of plant

Withania frutescens is a plant species belonging to the family Solanaceae. It is native to the western Mediterranean region, including southern Iberia (in Portugal and south and southeastern Spain), the Balearic Islands, Northwest Africa (including Morocco and western Algeria) and the Canary Islands.

== Description ==
This shrub can grow up to three meters in height but typically reaches about one and a half meters.

It flowers between May and June and sheds its leaves during the summer. The berries are greenish and have a diameter of 7 to 8 mm.

== Taxonomy ==
Withania frutescens was described by Linnaeus Pauquy and published in De la Belladone . . . Paris 14, in 1825.
