= N. S. Rajkumar Manraadiar =

Indian politician

N. S. Rajkumar Manraadiar was elected to the Tamil Nadu Legislative Assembly from the Kangayam constituency in the 1996 elections. He was a candidate of the Dravida Munnetra Kazhagam (DMK) party.
