= Withaferin A =

Names
- IUPAC name (22R)-4β,27-Dihydroxy-5,6β:22,26-diepoxy-5β-ergosta-2,24-diene-1,26-dione
- Systematic IUPAC name (4S,4aR,5aR,6aS,6bS,9R,9aS,11aS,11bR)-4-Hydroxy-9-{(1S)-1-[(2R)-5-(hydroxymethyl)-4-methyl-6-oxo-3,6-dihydro-2H-pyran-2-yl]ethyl}-9a,11b-dimethyl-5a,6,6a,6b,7,8,9,9a,10,11,11a,11b-dodecahydrocyclopenta[1,2]phenanthro[8a,9-b]oxiren-1(4H)-one
- Other names Withaferine A

Identifiers
CAS Number	5119-48-2
3D model (JSmol)	Interactive image
ChEBI	CHEBI:69120
ChEMBL	ChEMBL1221986
ChemSpider	233064
PubChem CID	265237
UNII	L6DO3QW4K5
CompTox Dashboard (EPA)	DTXSID10965459
- InChI: InChI=1S/C28H38O6/c1-14-11-21(33-25(32)17(14)13-29)15(2)18-5-6-19-16-12-24-28(34-24)23(31)8-7-22(30)27(28,4)20(16)9-10-26(18,19)3/h7-8,15-16,18-21,23-24,29,31H,5-6,9-13H2,1-4H3/t15-,16-,18+,19-,20-,21+,23-,24+,26+,27-,28+/m0/s1 Key: DBRXOUCRJQVYJQ-CKNDUULBSA-N; InChI=1/C28H38O6/c1-14-11-21(33-25(32)17(14)13-29)15(2)18-5-6-19-16-12-24-28(34-24)23(31)8-7-22(30)27(28,4)20(16)9-10-26(18,19)3/h7-8,15-16,18-21,23-24,29,31H,5-6,9-13H2,1-4H3/t15-,16-,18+,19-,20-,21+,23-,24+,26+,27-,28+/m0/s1 Key: DBRXOUCRJQVYJQ-CKNDUULBBI
- SMILES: O=C/1O[C@H](CC(=C\1CO)\C)[C@@H](C)[C@H]6CC[C@@H]4[C@]6(C)CC[C@@H]3[C@]5(C(=O)\C=C/[C@H](O)[C@]52O[C@@H]2C[C@H]34)C

Properties
Chemical formula	C_{28}H_{38}O_{6}
Molar mass	470.606 g·mol^{−1}
- Except where otherwise noted, data are given for materials in their standard state (at 25 °C [77 °F], 100 kPa). Infobox references

Withaferin A is a steroidal lactone, derived from Withania somnifera, Iochroma arborescens and other members of family Solanaceae. It is the first member of the withanolide class of ergostane type product to be discovered.

== Structure ==
Withanolides are a group of naturally occurring C28- steroidal lactones. They contain four cycloalkane ring structures, three cyclohexane rings and one cyclopentane ring. Withaferin A is highly reactive because of the ketone-containing unsaturated A ring, the epoxide in the B ring, and the unsaturated lactone ring. The double bond in ring A and the epoxide ring are mainly responsible for the cytotoxicity. The 22nd and 26th carbons of the ergostane skeleton in withaferin A and related steroidal compounds are oxidized to form a six-membered delta lactone unit. NMR spectral analysis identifies C3 in the unsaturated A ring as the main nucleophilic target site for ethyl mercaptan, thiophenol and L-cysteine ethyl ester in vitro. A library of 2, 3-dihydro-3β-substituted derivatives are synthesized by regio/stereoselective Michael addition to ring A.

== Regulation ==
=== Transcription factor NF-κB in vitro ===
NF-κB is a transcription factor that regulates many genes involved in cell survival, growth, immune response and angiogenesis. Withaferin A inhibits NF-κB at a very low concentration by targeting the ubiquitin-mediated proteasome pathway (UPP) in endothelial cells. In vitro experiments demonstrated that withaferin A inhibits other transcription factors including Ap1 and Sp1.

== Biosynthesis ==
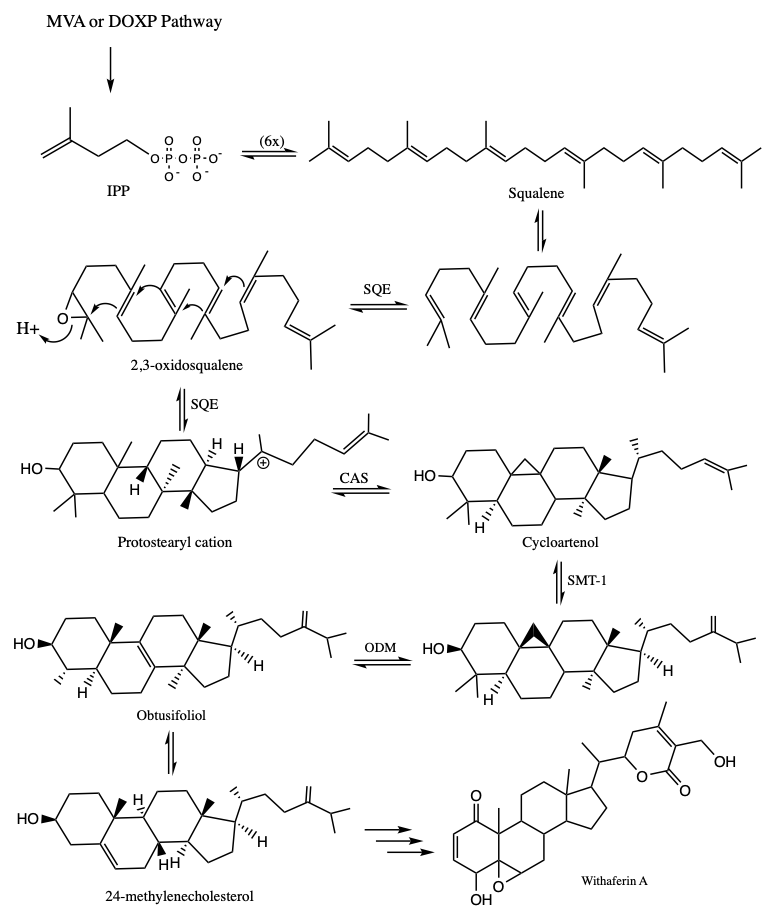
Biosynthesis of withaferin A

In the Withania somnifera plant, the withaferin A is present in the leaves. Withanolides are terpenoids, which are synthesized in plants using isoprenoids as precursors. Isoprenoids can be synthesized through mevalonate or 1-deoxy-D-xylulose 5-phosphate pathways. Isoprenogenesis significantly governs withanolide synthesis.

Isoprenoids form squalene, which then goes through a variety of intermediate steps to form 24-methylenecholesterol - the sterol precursor of the withanolides.

The biosynthesis of withaferin A uses enzymes such as squalene epoxidase (SQE), cycloartenol synthase (CAS), sterol methyl transferase (SMT), and obtusifoliol-14 –demethylase (ODM).

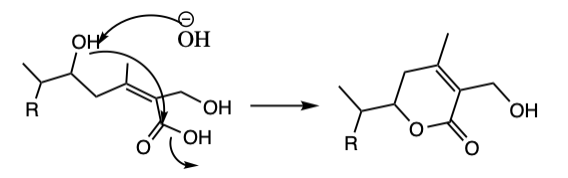
Lactone ring formation in withaferin A biosynthesis

To produce withaferin A from 24-methylene cholesterol, the molecule undergoes several functional changes including formation of a ketone, epoxide, 2 hydroxyl groups, and lactone ring.

== See also ==
- Withanolide
