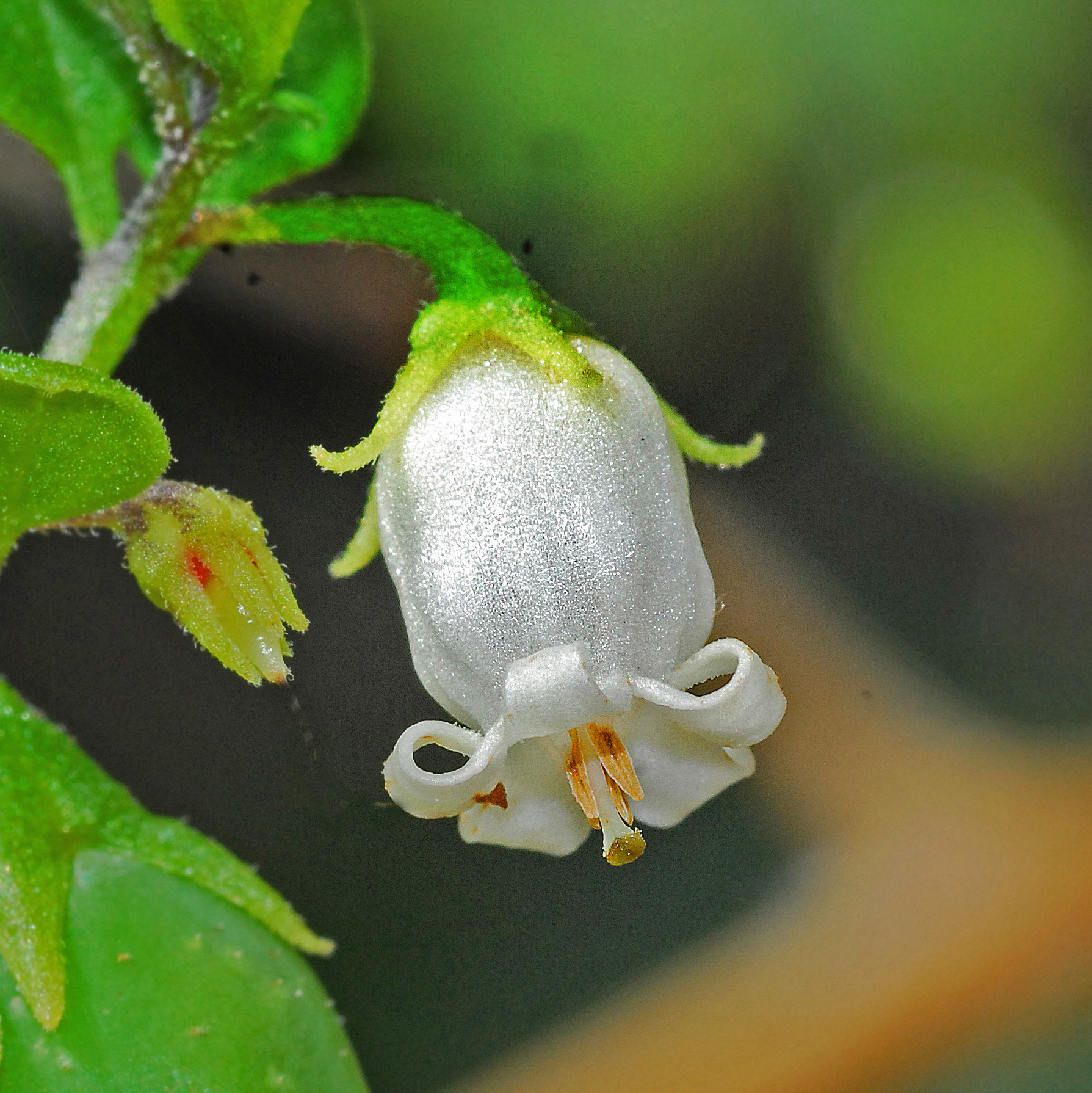
- Flower of Salpichroa origanifolia

Scientific classification
- Kingdom: Plantae
- Clade: Tracheophytes
- Clade: Angiosperms
- Clade: Eudicots
- Clade: Asterids
- Order: Solanales
- Family: Solanaceae
- Genus: Salpichroa
- Species: S. origanifolia

Binomial name
- Salpichroa origanifolia (Lam.) Baill.

Synonyms
- Atropa origanifolia (Lam.) Desf.; Atropa rhomboidea Gillies & Hook.; Jaborosa montevidensis Casar.; Perizoma rhomboidea (Gillies & Hook.) Small; Physalis curassavica L.; Physalis origanifolia Lam.; Planchonia arbutifolia Dunal; Salpichroa rhomboidea (Gill & Hook.) Miers; Withania origanifolia (Lam.) Paillieux & Boiss

= Salpichroa origanifolia =

Species of plant

Salpichroa origanifolia is a species of flowering plant in the nightshade family known by the common names lily of the valley vine, pampas lily-of-the-valley or cock's-eggs.

== Distribution and habitat ==
This species is native to South America (Brazil, Bolivia, Peru, Argentina, Chile, Paraguay, Uruguay) and is naturalised in Africa (Algeria, Morocco, Tunisia), Australasia, Europe (United Kingdom, Italy, Spain, France, Portugal), and North America (United States, Mexico). This plant is present in grasslands, roadsides and in neglected areas and may occasionally occur in gardens, at an elevation up to 100 metres (330 ft) above sea level.

== Description ==
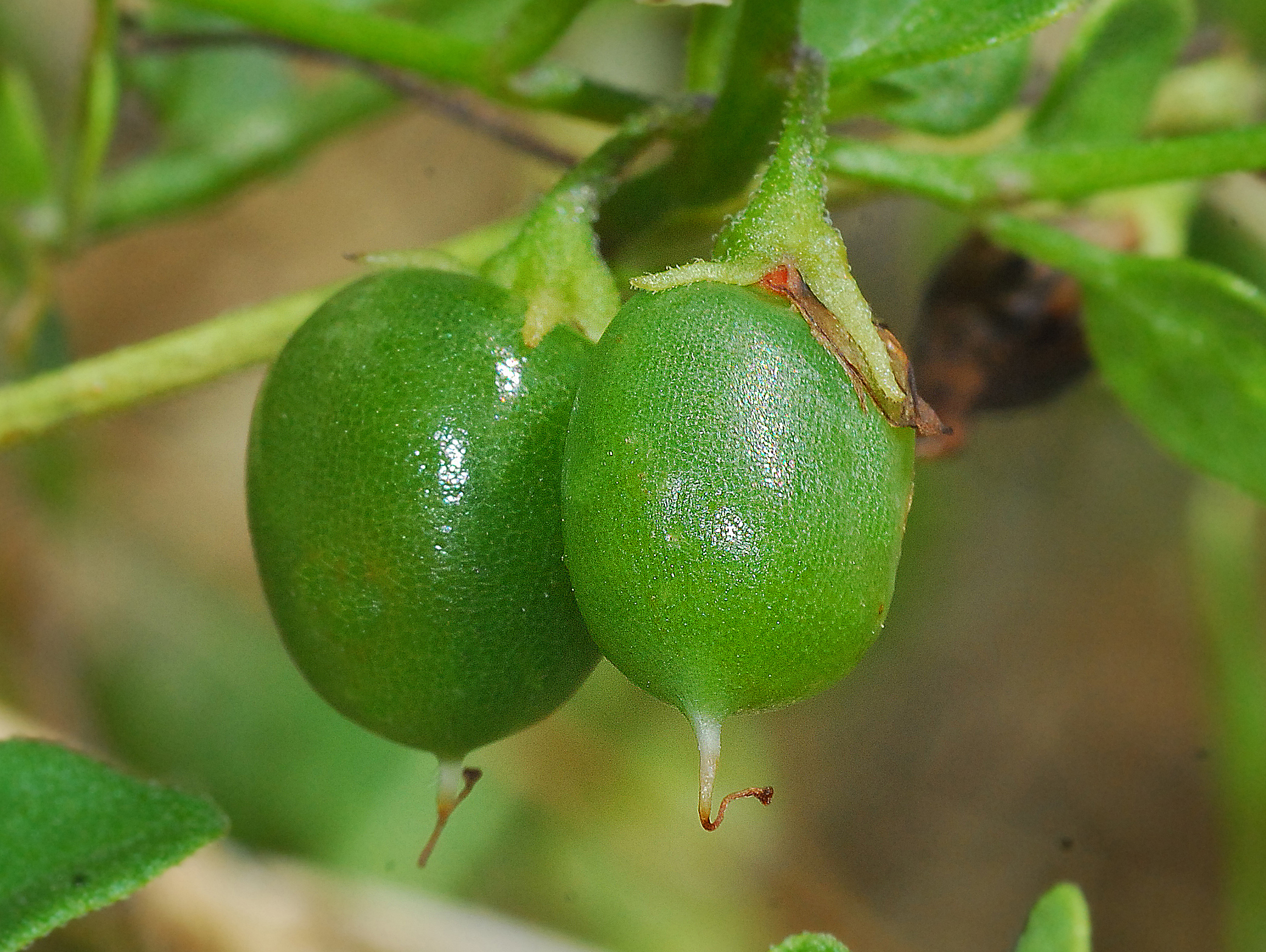
Fruits

Salpichroa origanifolia can reach a stem length of about 2–3 m (6 ft 7 in – 9 ft 10 in). This perennial, rhizomatous, decumbent to climbing, hairy vine has a trailing, highly branched, four-cornered zig-zagging stems. Leaves are glabrous, widely elliptic to ovate or also rounded and can reach a length of about 10–35 mm (0.39–1.38 in), with a petiole of about 5–10 mm (0.20–0.39 in). The flowers are rather small, 1–1.5 cm (0.39–0.59 in) long and are born from the axils of the leaves. The calyx lobes reach 2–3 mm (0.079–0.118 in). Corolla is bell-shaped or urn-shaped, white or greenish. Anthers reach 1.5–2 mm (0.059–0.079 in). Fruits can reach 10–15 mm (0.39–0.59 in). They are ovoid berries, ill-smelling and turn white or pale yellow when ripe.

== Biology ==
This invasive vine commonly spreads via seeds and fragments of roots. Seeds germinate from early Spring to late Summer. Flowering occurs at any time but especially in Summer and bears fruits in Autumn.

== Human culture ==
Lily of the valley vine is commonly grown as an ornamental plant in some countries. In others, it is considered an invasive weed. In Tasmania, it is regarded as a toxic weed and its sale and distribution are illegal.

== Gallery ==
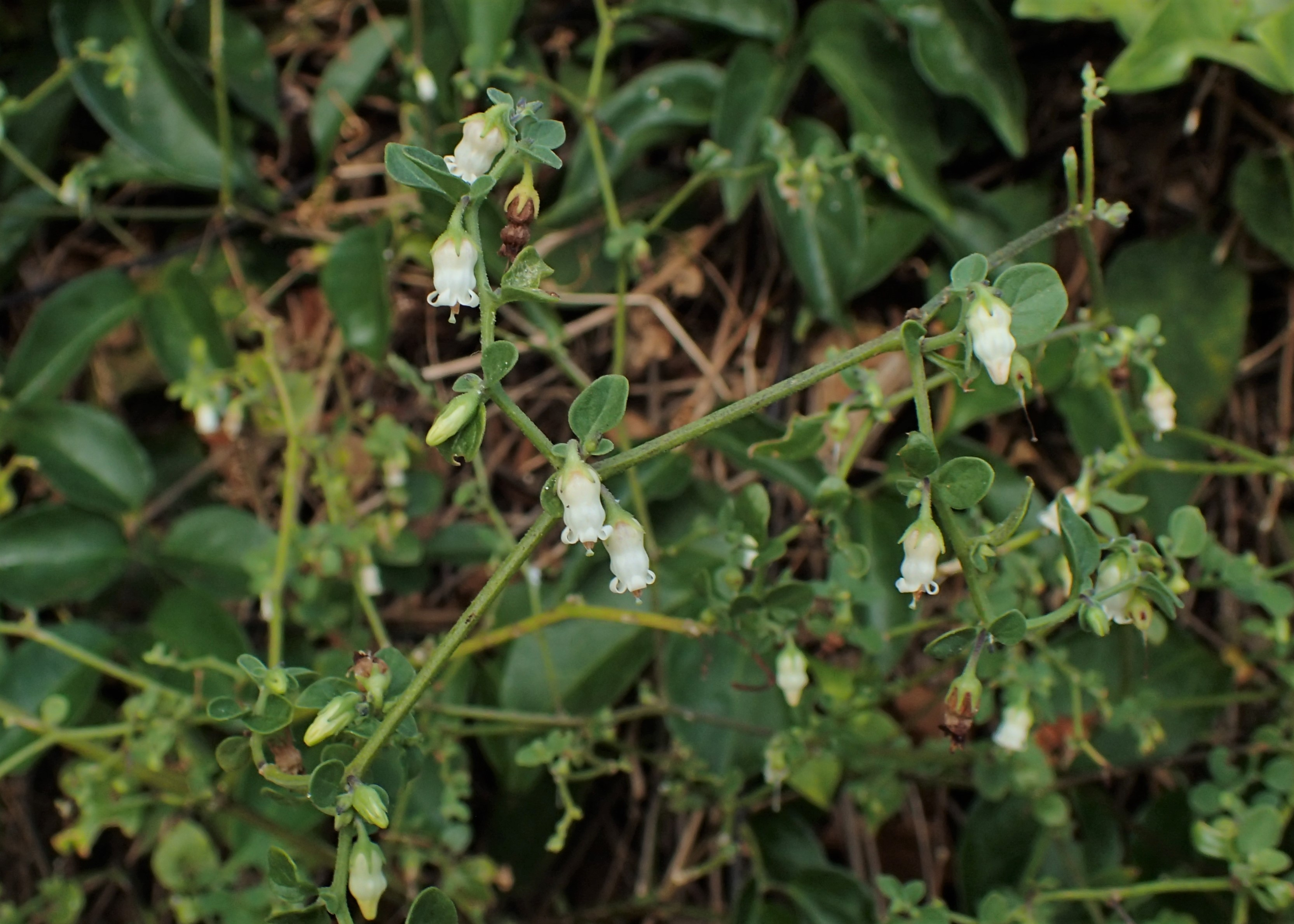
Plant in flower

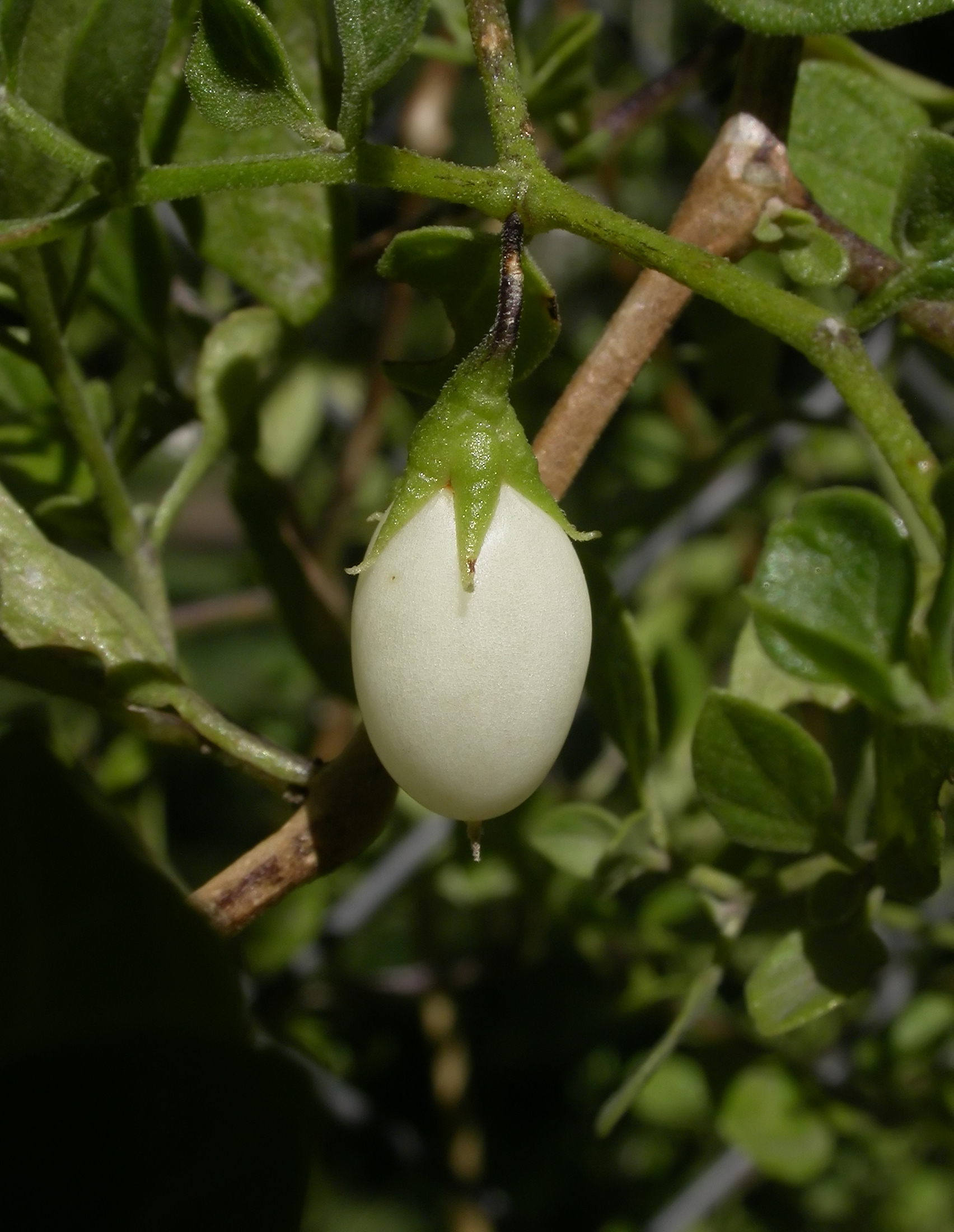
Ripe fruit

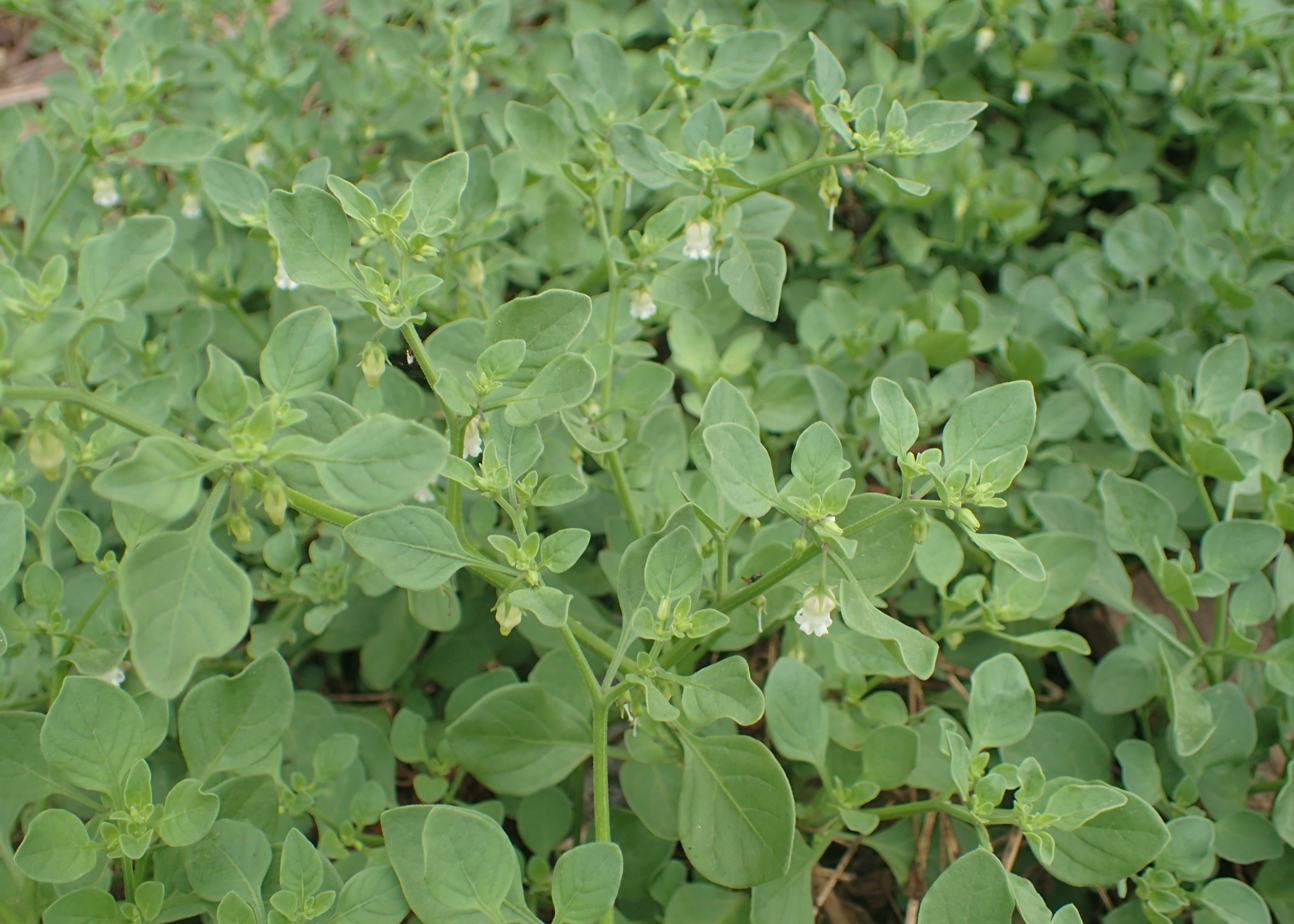
Leaves
