= Charles Louis Constant Pauquy =

French botanist

Charles Louis Constant Pauquy (27 September 1800 – 11 February 1854) was a French pharmacist and botanist.

Charles-Louis Constant Pauquy was born in Amiens on 27 September 1800, the son of a pharmacist. He completed his own studies in pharmacy in 1821.

He died in 1854; plants he described are appended "Pauquy".

== See also ==
- Withania frutescens
