= Durai Ramasamy =

Indian politician

Durai Ramasamy was an Indian politician and Member of the Legislative Assembly of Tamil Nadu.

== Political career ==
Ramasamy joined Congress under K. Kamaraj. He served as the Vellakovil Panchayat board president for 10 years, then as union chairman for 15 years. When the Congress split in Tamil Nadu, he joined the NCO under Kamaraj. After Kamaraj's death, he, along with G. Moopanar, merged the party with Indira Congress.

He was elected to the Tamil Nadu legislative assembly as an Indian National Congress candidate from Vellakoil constituency for five terms. He was first elected in 1977, then as an Anna Dravida Munnetra Kazhagam candidate in 1980 and 1984. He was also a Anna Dravida Munnetra Kazhagam (Jayalalitha) candidate in the 1989 election.

In 1991, he was again elected from Vellakovil constituency and became the Minister for Rural Industries. In 2001 he unsuccessfully ran for electoral seat from AIADMk. After founding his own party, he again joined ADMK in 2010.

He died on 23 December 2023.
