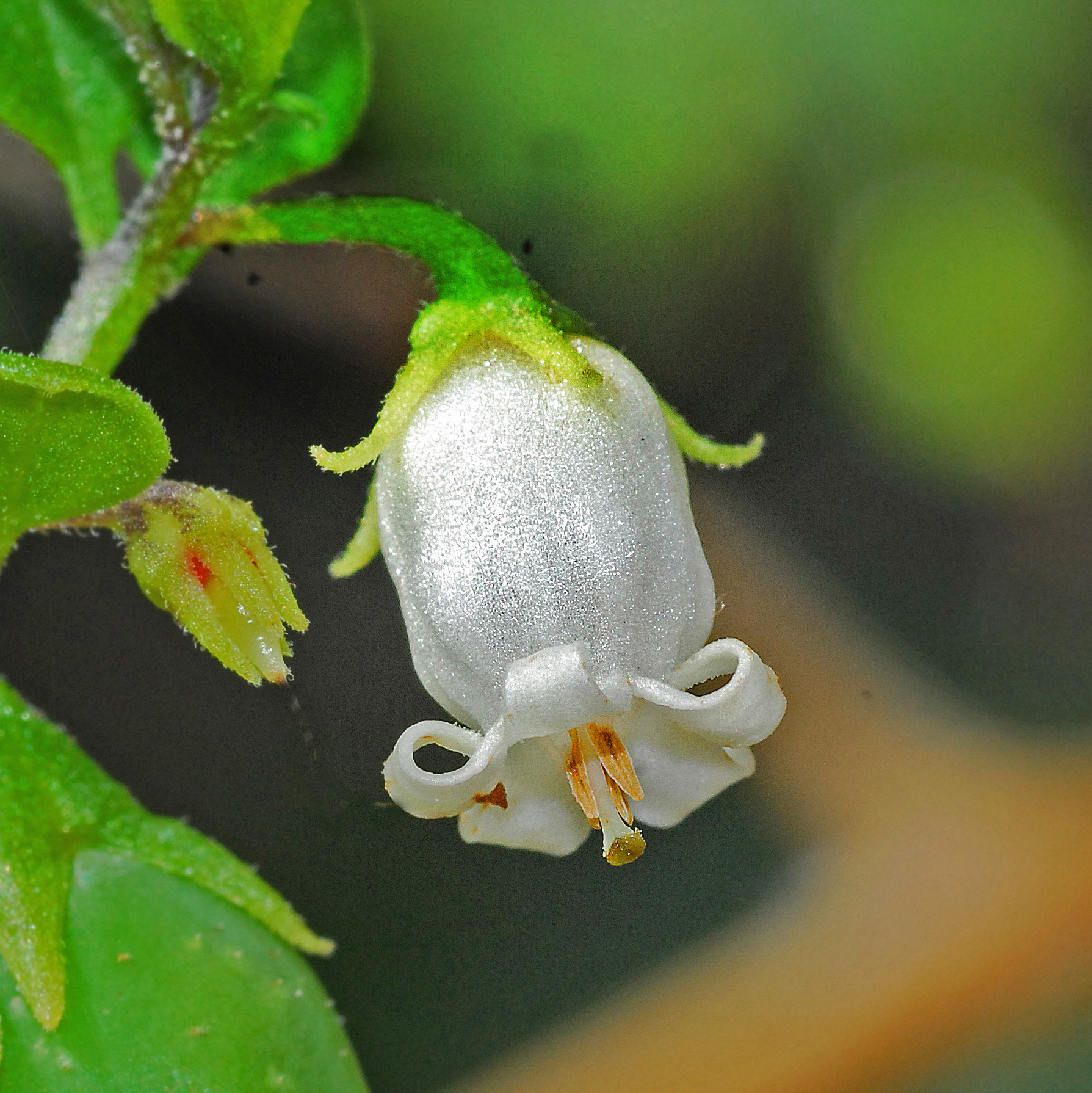
- Salpichroa origanifolia

Scientific classification
- Kingdom: Plantae
- Clade: Tracheophytes
- Clade: Angiosperms
- Clade: Eudicots
- Clade: Asterids
- Order: Solanales
- Family: Solanaceae
- Genus: Salpichroa; Miers

Synonyms
- Heterotypic Synonyms: Busbeckia Mart.; Perizoma Miers ex Lindl.; Planchonia Dunal; Salpichroma Miers

= Salpichroa =

Genus of plants

Salpichroa is a genus of flowering plants belonging to the family Solanaceae. It is native to Argentina, Bolivia, Brazil, Chile, Colombia, Ecuador, Paraguay, Peru, Uruguay, and Venezuela.

== Species ==
Accepted species include:

- Salpichroa dependens (Mathews ex Hook.) Miers
- Salpichroa didieriana Jaub.
- Salpichroa diffusa Miers
- Salpichroa gayi Benoist
- Salpichroa glandulosa (Hook.) Miers
- Salpichroa hirsuta (Meyen) Miers
- Salpichroa leucantha Pereyra, Quip. & S.Leiva
- Salpichroa micrantha Benoist
- Salpichroa microloba Keel
- Salpichroa microphylla (Dunal) Keel
- Salpichroa origanifolia (Lam.) Baill.
- Salpichroa proboscidea Benoist
- Salpichroa ramosissima Miers
- Salpichroa salpoensis S.Leiva
- Salpichroa sanmiguelina S.Leiva
- Salpichroa scandens Dammer
- Salpichroa tristis Miers
- Salpichroa weberbaueri Dammer
- Salpichroa weigendii S.Leiva, Jara & Barboza
