= S. Sekar =

Indian politician

Member of the Tamil Nadu Legislative Assembly
- Incumbent
- Assumed office 12 May 2021
- Preceded by: K. S. Moorthiy
- Constituency: Paramathi-Velur

Personal details
- Party: All India Anna Dravida Munnetra Kazhagam

S. Sekar is an Indian politician. He is a member of the All India Anna Dravida Munnetra Kazhagam party. He was elected as a member of Tamil Nadu Legislative Assembly from Paramathi-Velur Constituency in May 2021.

== Elections contested ==
| Election | Constituency | Party | Result | Vote % | Runner-up | Runner-up Party | Runner-up vote % | Ref. |
|---|---|---|---|---|---|---|---|---|
| 2021 Tamil Nadu Legislative Assembly election | Paramathi-Velur | ADMK | Won | 47.08% | K. S. Moorthiy | DMK | 42.89% | |
