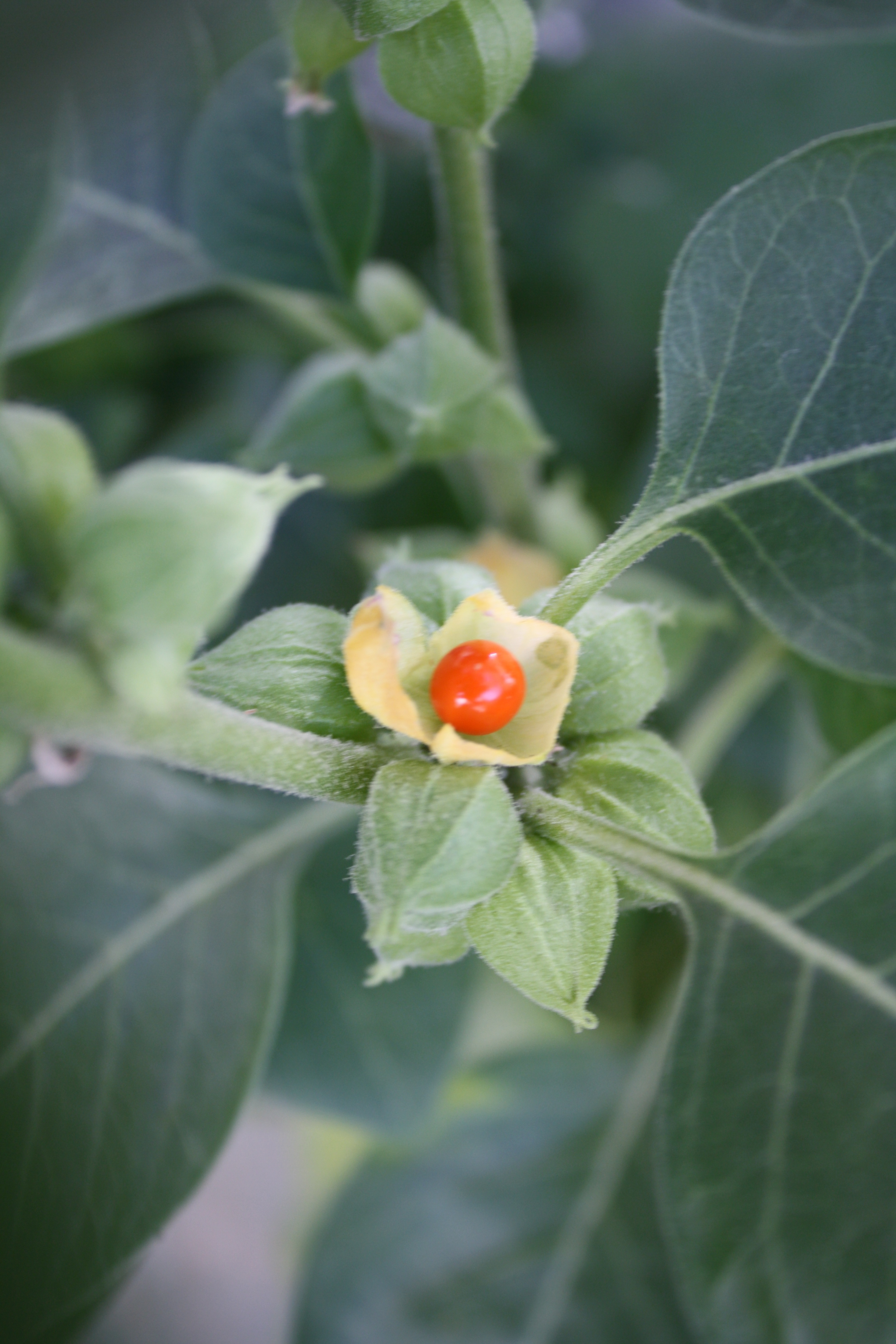

Conservation status
- Least Concern (IUCN 3.1)

Scientific classification
- Kingdom: Plantae
- Clade: Tracheophytes
- Clade: Angiosperms
- Clade: Eudicots
- Clade: Asterids
- Order: Solanales
- Family: Solanaceae
- Genus: Withania
- Species: W. somnifera

Binomial name
- Withania somnifera (L.) Dunal

Synonyms
- List: Alicabon somniferum (L.) Raf.; Larnax morrisonii (Dunal) Miers; Physalis alpini J.Jacq.; Physalis flexuosa L.; Physalis scariosa Webb & Berthel.; Physalis somnifera L.; Physaloides somnifera (L.) Moench; Withania arborescens Dunal; Withania chevalieri A.E.Gonç.; Withania kansuensis Kuang & A. M. Lu; Withania microphysalis Suess; Withania morisonii Dunal; Withania mucronata Chiov.; Withania obtusifolia Täckh.; Withania sicula Lojac.

= Withania somnifera =

Species of flowering plant

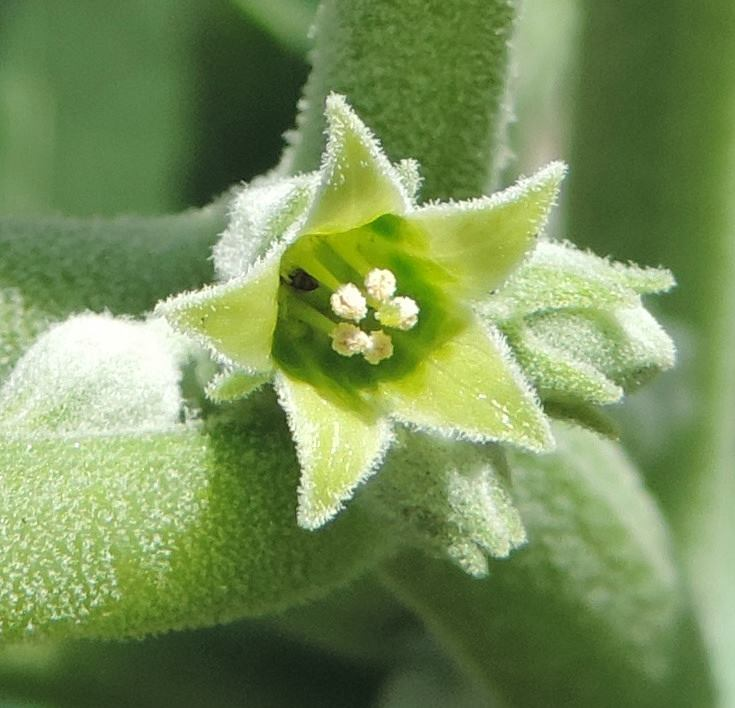
Flower

Withania somnifera, known commonly as ashwagandha, is an evergreen shrub in the Solanaceae family that is native to the Middle East and North Africa, other African regions, southern Europe, the Indian subcontinent, and Southeast Asia. Several other species in the genus Withania are morphologically similar. Other common names include Indian ginseng and winter cherry.

Withania somnifera is a short shrub 35–75 cm (14–30 in) tall with tomentose branches, dull green elliptic leaves up to 10–12 cm (3.9–4.7 in) long, small green bell-shaped flowers, and orange-red ripe fruit. It is affected by various pests and diseases in India, which can damage plant health and reduce its secondary metabolite content.

The plant, particularly its root powder, has been used for centuries in traditional Indian medicine. W. somnifera is commonly sold as a dietary supplement containing root or leaf powder or extracts. It is undergoing research for potential effects on stress, anxiety, and sleep, but current clinical evidence is insufficient to confirm its safety or efficacy. The primary phytochemicals in W. somnifera are withanolides—structurally similar to ginsenosides in Panax ginseng—along with alkaloids and sitoindosides, leading to its nickname, Indian ginseng.

Withania somnifera is generally well tolerated for up to about three months with mostly mild side effects. It should be avoided during pregnancy or in people with hormone-sensitive conditions. It has been linked to rare cases of liver injury, particularly in people with preexisting liver conditions.

== Description ==
This species is a short shrub growing 35–75 cm (14–30 in) tall. Tomentose branches extend radially from a central stem. Leaves are dull green, elliptic, and usually up to 10–12 cm (3.9–4.7 in) long. The flowers are small, green, and bell-shaped. The ripe fruit is orange-red.

== Etymology ==
The Latin species name somnifera means "sleep-inducing". The name ashwagandha is a combination of the Sanskrit words ashva, meaning "horse", and gandha, meaning "smell", reflecting that the root has a strong, horse-like odor.

== Cultivation ==
Withania somnifera is cultivated in many of the drier regions of India. It is also found in Nepal, Sri Lanka, China, and Yemen. It prefers dry, stony soil with sun to partial shade. It can be propagated from seeds in the early spring or from greenwood cuttings in the later spring.

== Diseases and pests ==
Withania somnifera is prone to several pests and diseases. Leaf-spot disease caused by Alternaria alternata is the most prevalent disease, which occurs in a severe form in Punjab, Haryana, and Himachal Pradesh. Leaf-spot disease reduces the concentration of its secondary metabolites. The leaves are also prone to Alternaria dianthicola in India.

A treehopper (Oxyrachis tarandus) feeds on the apical portions of the stem, making them rough and woody in appearance and brown in colour.

The carmine red spider mite (Tetranychus urticae) is the most prevalent pest of the plant in India. In recent years, this plant has been serving as a new reservoir host for an invasive mealybug species Phenacoccus solenopsis.

== Phytochemistry ==
The main phytochemical constituents of W. somnifera are withanolides, a group of triterpene lactones that include withaferin A, alkaloids, steroidal lactones, tropine, and cuscohygrine. Forty withanolides, twelve alkaloids, and various sitoindosides have been isolated from this plant species. As these withanolides are structurally similar to the ginsenosides of Panax ginseng, W. somnifera is commonly referred to as "Indian ginseng".

== Traditional medicine and dietary supplements ==
The plant, particularly its root powder, has been used for centuries in traditional Indian medicine. W. somnifera is commonly sold as a dietary supplement containing root or leaf powder or extracts. It is undergoing research for potential effects on stress, anxiety, and sleep, but current clinical evidence is insufficient to confirm its safety or efficacy.

=== Stress and anxiety ===
Ashwagandha root preparations have also been reviewed for their traditional use in stress reduction and anxiety support.

At oral doses of 300 to 600 mg per day over a three month period, ashwagandha root extract may be useful in treating generalized anxiety disorder, although the evidence for efficacy is tentative and the treatment may cause nausea and diarrhea.

=== Sleep ===
There is limited evidence that W. somnifera extract, especially at higher doses and over longer durations, may modestly improve sleep quality and related outcomes, with more noticeable effects in people with insomnia. A 2021 review concluded that W. somnifera extract modestly improves sleep quality and quantity in adults, especially those with insomnia, and may reduce anxiety and enhance alertness.

== Adverse effects ==
Withania somnifera may cause adverse effects if taken alone or together with prescription drugs. The most common side effects include diarrhea, headache, sedation, and nausea. Ashwagandha may increase testosterone levels, which could adversely interact with cancer medications.

Withania somnifera can cause hepatotoxicity, and its use as a supplement has been linked to herb-induced liver injury, particularly in people with preexisting liver conditions. Use of W. somnifera is not recommended during pregnancy or in people with hormone-sensitive prostate cancer.

Careful consideration of individual dosage and potential adverse effects is generally recommended before routine supplementation.

== Gallery ==
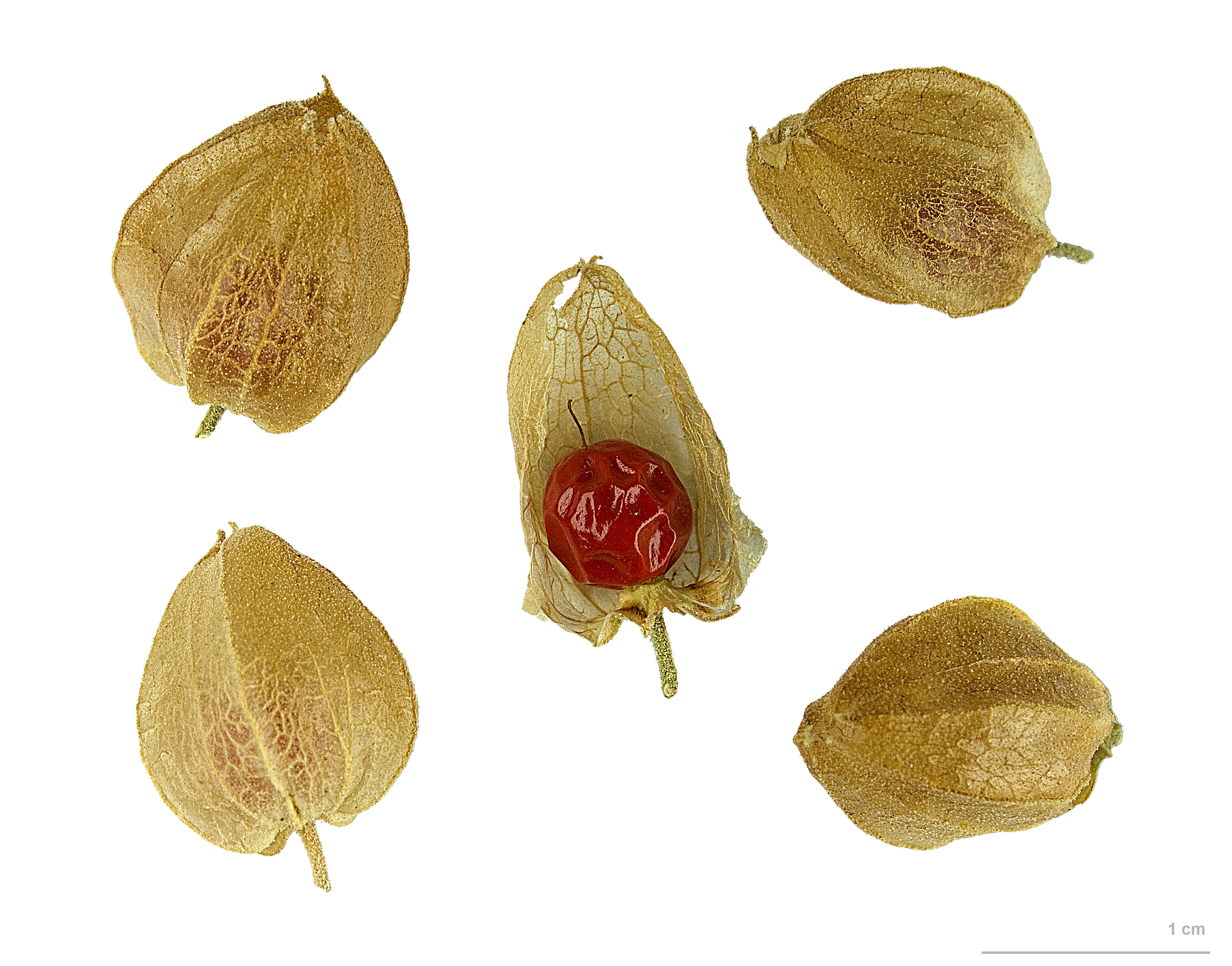
Fruits

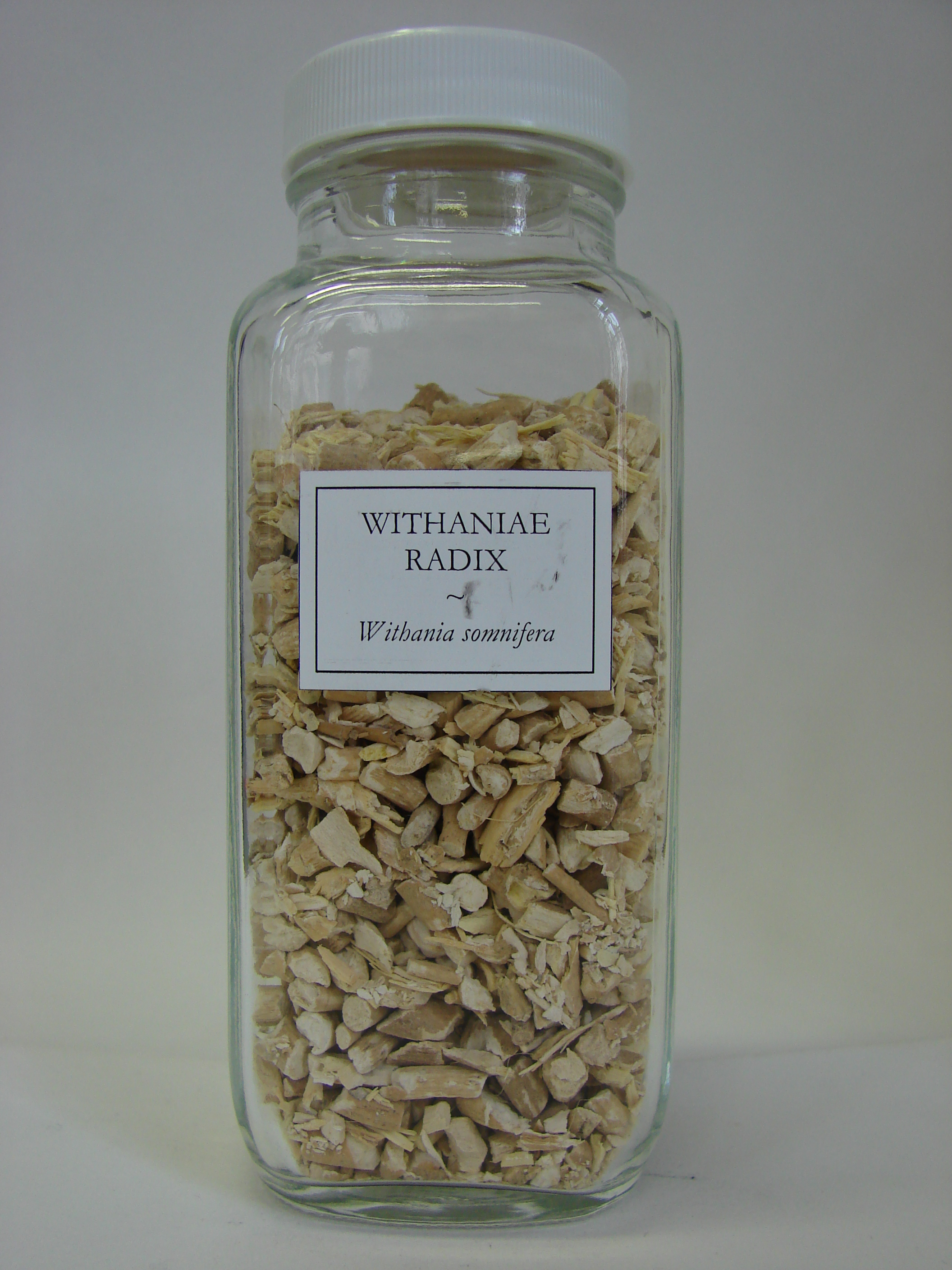
Druggist's jar containing dried roots of Withania somnifera

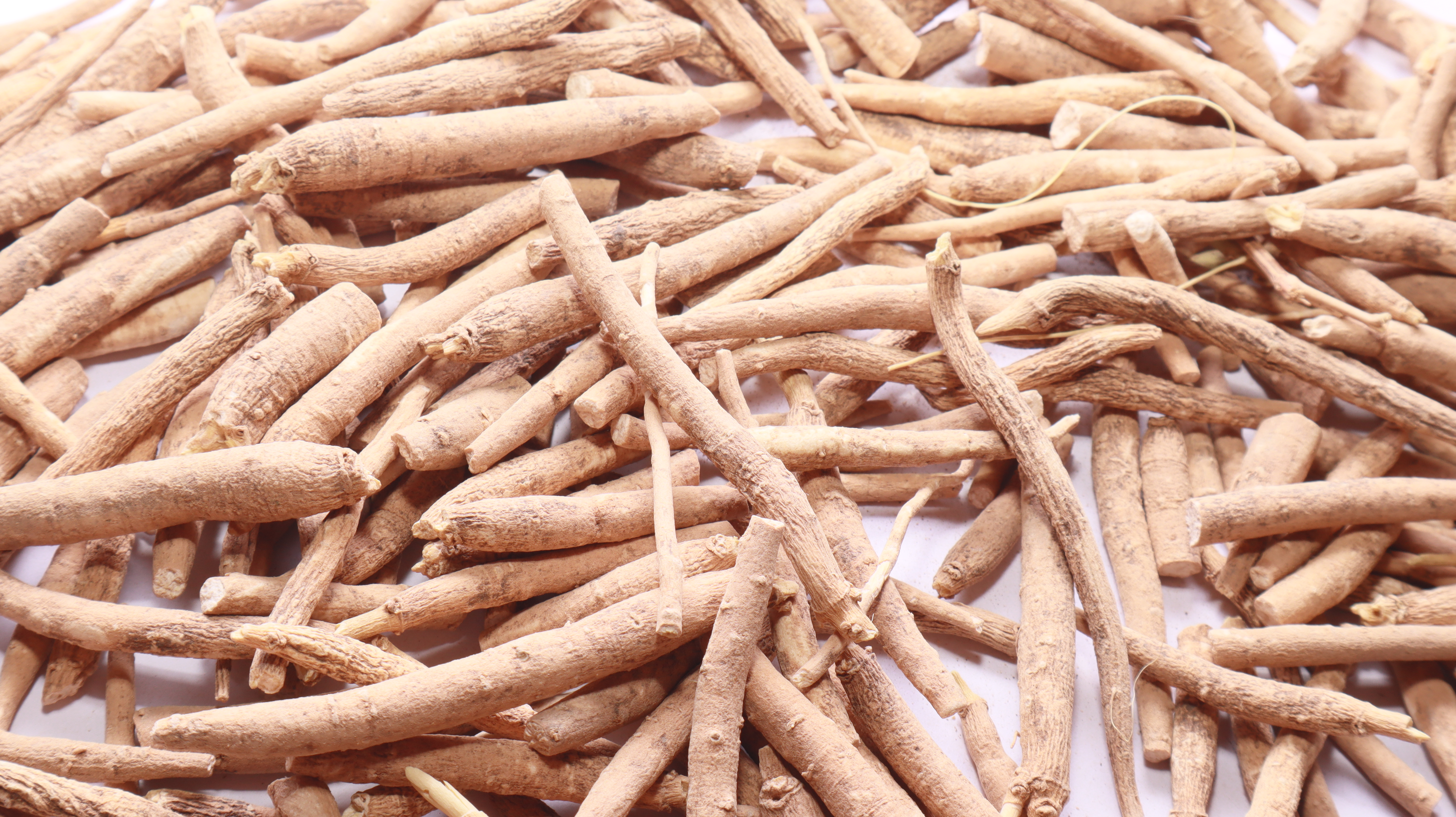
Dried graded roots of Withania somnifera
