= Withania riebeckii =

Conservation status
- Least Concern (IUCN 3.1)

Scientific classification
- Kingdom: Plantae
- Clade: Tracheophytes
- Clade: Angiosperms
- Clade: Eudicots
- Clade: Asterids
- Order: Solanales
- Family: Solanaceae
- Genus: Withania
- Species: W. riebeckii

Binomial name
- Withania riebeckii Schweinf. ex Balf.f.

Synonyms
- Withania simonyaua R.Wagner ex Vierh.

Species of plant

Withania riebeckii is a species of plant in the family Solanaceae. It is endemic to the islands of Socotra and Samhah in Yemen's Socotra Archipelago. It is widespread in succulent shrubland and drought deciduous woodland from sea-level to 800 metres elevation.
