= Jayalalithaa ministry =

Jayalalithaa ministry may refer to these cabinets headed by Indian politician J. Jayalalithaa as chief minister of Tamil Nadu:

- First Jayalalithaa ministry (1991–1996)
- Second Jayalalithaa ministry (2001)
- Third Jayalalithaa ministry (2002–2006)
- Fourth Jayalalithaa ministry (2011–2014)
- Fifth Jayalalithaa ministry (2015–2016)
- Sixth Jayalalithaa ministry (2016)
