= Karunanidhi ministry =

Karunanidhi ministry may refer to these cabinets headed by Indian politician M. Karunanidhi as chief minister of Tamil Nadu:

- First Karunanidhi ministry (1969-1971)
- Second Karunanidhi ministry (1971–1976)
- Third Karunanidhi ministry (1989–1991)
- Fourth Karunanidhi ministry (1996-2001)
- Fifth Karunanidhi ministry (2006-2011)
