= C. Saraswathi =

Indian politician

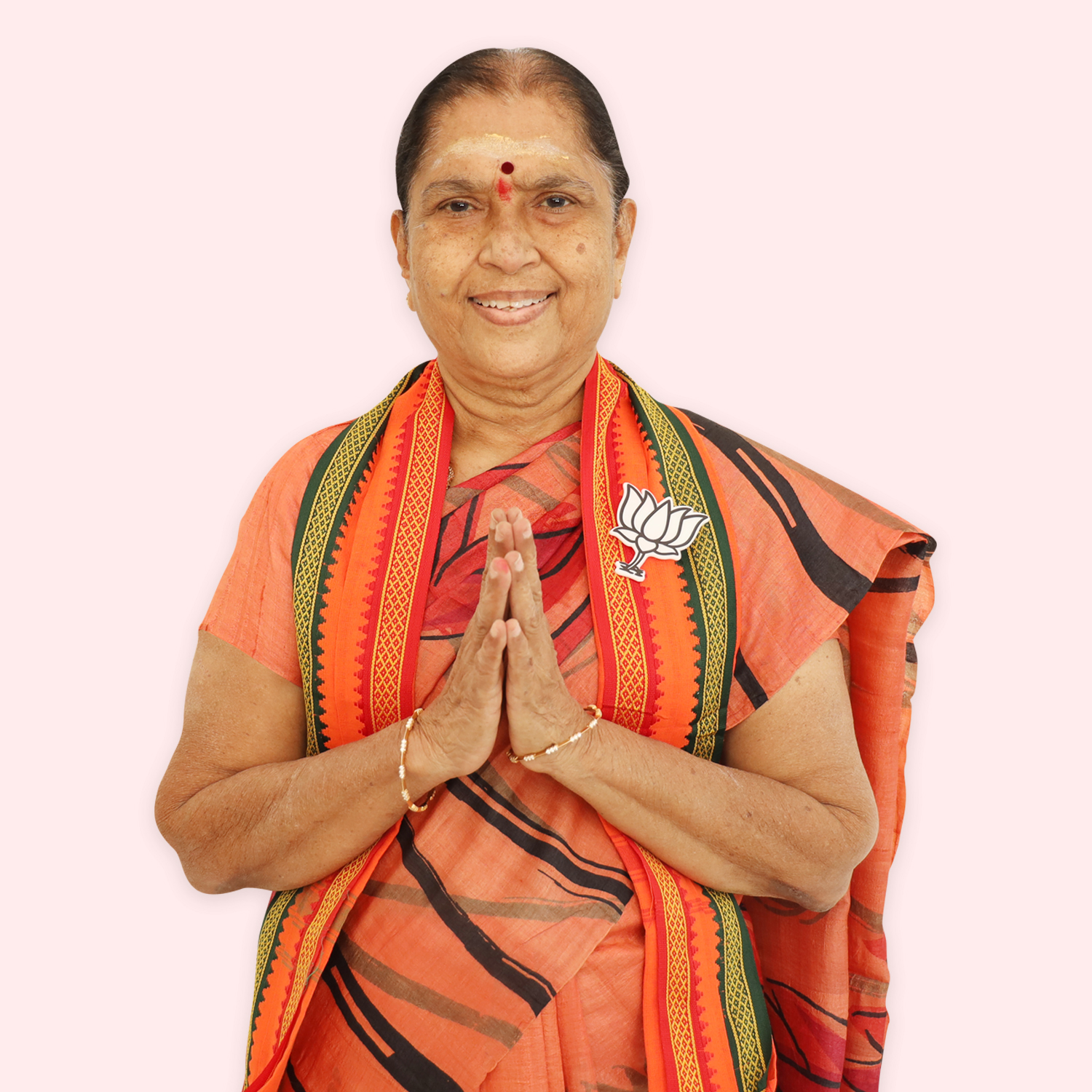

Member of the Tamil Nadu Legislative Assembly
- In office 12 May 2021 – 4 May 2026
- Preceded by: V. P. Subramani
- Constituency: Modakkurichi

Personal details
- Born: 1945 (age 80–81)
- Party: Bharatiya Janata Party
- Spouse: Chinnasamy
- Education: MBBS, DCH
- Alma mater: Madras University
- Profession: Medical doctor, politician

Chinnasamy Saraswathi (born 1945) is an Indian doctor turned politician and a Member of Tamil Nadu Legislative Assembly representing Modakkurichi. She belongs to the Bharatiya Janata Party.

== Education ==
She has qualified as a medical doctor passing the MBBS examination of Madras University in the year 1968. She also qualified with a Diploma in Child Health (DCH) at the same University in 1972.

== Profession ==
She is a medical doctor by profession. Together with her husband Chinnasamy, who is also a medical doctor, she owns C. K. Hospital at Erode. Therefore, sometimes, she is called as C. K. Saraswathi.

== Legislative member ==
She contested the 2021 election for Tamil Nadu Legislative Assembly from the Modakkurichi (state assembly constituency) in the district of Erode, and won against the DMK's former minister Subbulakshmi Jagadeesan, with a margin of 281 votes.
