= First Panneerselvam ministry =

Government of Tamil Nadu, India (2001–2002)

- 12th Ministry of Tamil Nadu
- Date formed: 21 September 2001
- Date dissolved: 2 March 2002

People and organisations
- Head of state: Governor C. Rangarajan (Additional Charge)
- Head of government: J. Jayalalithaa
- Member parties: AIADMK
- Status in legislature: Majority
- Opposition party: DMK
- Opposition leader: K. Anbazhagan

History
- Election: 2001
- Legislature term: 5 Years
- Predecessor: Second Jayalalithaa ministry
- Successor: Third Jayalalithaa ministry

After the resignation of J. Jayalalithaa as Chief Minister, the Governor appointed O. Panneerselvam as Chief Minister and 23 more Ministers on 21 September 2001. He resigned as Jayalalithaa returned to power.

== Cabinet ministers ==
S.no	Name	Designation	Portfolios	Party
Chief Minister
1.	O. Panneerselvam	Chief Minister	Public; Indian Administrative Service; Indian Police Service; other All India Services; General Administration; District Revenue Officers; Home; Police; Prohibition & Excise; Molasses; Prevention of Corruption and Prisons * Revenue; District Revenue Establishment; Deputy Collectors; Registration, Stamp Act; Stationery & Printing; Government Press; Bhoodhan & Gramdhan	AIADMK
Cabinet Ministers
2.	C. Ponnaiyan	Minister for Finance	Finance; Planning; Legislative Assembly and Elections; Legislation; Weights and Measures; Debt Relief including Legislation on *money lending; Chits; Registration of Companies	AIADMK
3.	Dr. M. Thambi Durai	Minister for Education	Education; Technical Education; Science and Technology; Archaeology; Tamil Development and Tamil Culture; Indians Overseas; Refugees and Evacuees	AIADMK
4.	D. Jayakumar	Minister for Law and Electricity	Electricity; Non-Conventional Energy Development	AIADMK
5.	P.C. Ramasamy	Minister for Hindu Religious and Charitable Endowments	Hindu Religious and Charitable Endowments	AIADMK
6.	S. Semmalai	Minister for Health	Health; Medical Education; Family Welfare	AIADMK
7.	C. Durairaj	Minister for Local Administration	Municipal Administration; Rural Development; Panchayats and Panchayat Unions; Poverty Alleviation Programmes; Rural Indebtedness; Urban and Rural Water Supply	AIADMK
8.	A. Anwer Rhazza	Minister for Labour	Labour; Employment and Training; Urban and Rural Employment; Census; Wakfs	AIADMK
9.	K. Pandurangan	Minister for Industries	Industries; Iron and Steel Control; Mines and Minerals; Electronics	AIADMK
10.	P. Dhanabal	Minister for Food and Co-operation	Food; Civil Supplies; Consumer Protection; Price Control; Co-operation; Statistics	AIADMK
11.	N. Thalavaisundaram	Minister for Public Works	Public Works; Highways; Irrigation Including Minor Irrigation	AIADMK
12.	S. S. Thirunavukkarasu	Minister for Information & Publicity and Forests and Environment	Information and Publicity; Forests; Environment; Pollution Control	AIADMK
13.	R. Jeevanantham	Minister for Agriculture	Agriculture; Agricultural Engineering; Agro Service Co-operatives; Horticulture; Sugarcane Cess and Sugarcane Development	AIADMK
14.	R. Sarojaa	Minister for Tourism	Tourism; Tourism Development Corporation	AIADMK
15.	B. Valarmathi	Minister for Social Welfare	Social Welfare including Women’s and Children’s Welfare; Nutritious Noon Meal; Welfare of the Disabled; Beggar Homes; Orphanages and Correctional Administration	AIADMK
16.	V. Subramanian	Minister for Adi Dravidar Welfare	Adi Dravidar Welfare; Hill Tribes; Bonded Labour; Welfare of Ex-Servicemen	AIADMK
17.	S.P. Shanmuganathan	Minister for Handlooms and Textiles	Handlooms and Textiles	AIADMK
18.	K.P. Raajendra Prasad	Minister for Fisheries	Fisheries; Animal Husbandry	AIADMK
19.	R. Vaithilingam	Minister for Rural Industries	Rural Industries including Cottage Industries; Small Scale Industries; Khadi & Village Industries Board	AIADMK
20.	C. Shanmugavelu	Minister for Dairy Development	Milk and Dairy Development	AIADMK
21.	C. V. Shanmugam	Minister for Commercial Taxes	Commercial Taxes	AIADMK
22.	S.M. Velusamy	Minister for Housing and Urban Development	Housing; Housing Development; Town Planning; Slum Clearance; Accommodation Control; Urban Development and CMDA	AIADMK
11.	Nainar Nagenthran	Minister for Transport	Transport; Nationalised Transport; Motor Vehicles Act; Ports	AIADMK
24.	Valarmathi Jebaraj	Minister for Backward Classes	Backward Classes; Most Backward Classes and Denotified Communities	AIADMK
