= Modakurichi (disambiguation) =

Modakurichi is a neighbourhood in Modakurichi, Tamil Nadu, India.

Modakurichi may also refer to:

- Modakurichi town
- Modakurichi block
- Modakurichi taluk
- Modakkurichi (state assembly constituency)
