= Second Jayalalithaa ministry =

Government of Tamil Nadu, India in 2001

- 11th Ministry of Tamil Nadu

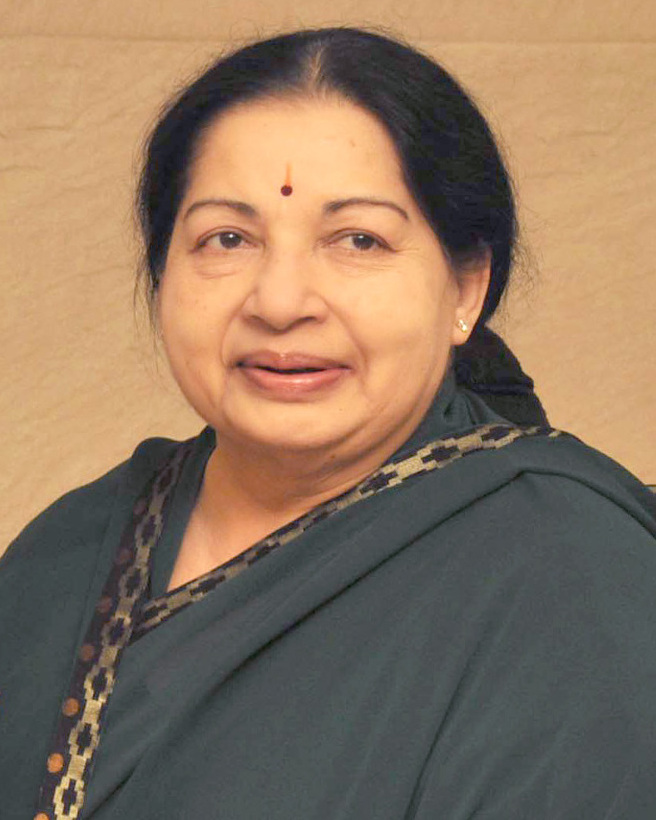
- J. Jayalalithaa
- Date formed: 14 May 2001
- Date dissolved: 21 September 2001

People and organisations
- Head of state: Governor M. Fathima Beevi
- Head of government: J. Jayalalithaa
- Member parties: AIADMK
- Status in legislature: Majority
- Opposition party: DMK
- Opposition leader: K. Anbazhagan

History
- Election: 2001
- Legislature term: 5 Years
- Predecessor: Fourth Karunanidhi ministry
- Successor: First Panneerselvam ministry

After the General Elections held on 10 May 2001 the Governor appointed J. Jayalalithaa as the Chief Minister of Tamil Nadu. The Governor on the advice of the Chief Minister appointed five more Members C. Ponnaiyan, Dr. M. Thambi Durai, D. Jayakumar, Ayyaru Vandayar and R. Sarojaa as ministers in the Council of Ministers on the same day. On 19 May 2001 the Governor appointed nineteen more members in the council. However, Jayalalithaa couldn't last long in office and to pave way for First Panneerselvam ministry.

== Cabinet ministers ==
S.no	Name	Designation	Portfolios	Party
Chief Minister
1.	J. Jayalalithaa	Chief Minister	Public; Home; Police; Indian Administrative Service; Indian Police Service; other All India Services; General Administration; District Revenue Officers; Prevention of Corruption; Minorities Welfare; Information Technology	AIADMK
Cabinet Ministers
2.	C. Ponnaiyan	Minister for Finance and Law	Finance; Planning; Legislative Assembly and Elections; Legislation; Law; Courts; Prisons; Weights and Measures; Debt Relief including Legislation on *money lending; Chits; Registration of Companies	AIADMK
3.	Dr. M. Thambi Durai	Minister for Education	Education; Technical Education; Science and Technology; Sports and Youth Welfare; Archaeology; Tamil Development and Tamil Culture; Indians Overseas; Refugees and Evacuees	AIADMK
4.	D. Jayakumar	Minister for Electricity	Electricity; Non-Conventional Energy Development	AIADMK
5.	P.C. Ramasamy	Minister for Hindu Religious and Charitable Endowments	Hindu Religious and Charitable Endowments	AIADMK
6.	R. Vaithilingam	Minister for Industries	Industries; Iron and Steel Control; Mines and Minerals	AIADMK
7.	S. Semmalai	Minister for Health	Health; Medical Education; Family Welfare	AIADMK
8.	C. Durairaj	Minister for Local Administration	Municipal Administration; Rural Development; Panchayats and Panchayat Unions; Poverty Alleviation Programmes; Rural Indebtedness; Urban and Rural Water Supply	AIADMK
9.	R. Jeevanantham	Minister for Agriculture	Agriculture; Agricultural Engineering; Agro Service Co-operatives; Horticulture; Sugarcane Cess and Sugarcane Development	AIADMK
10.	O. Panneerselvam	Minister for Revenue	Prohibition & Excise; Molasses; Revenue; District Revenue Establishment; Deputy Collectors; Registration, Stamp Act; Stationery & Printing; Government Press; Bhoodhan & Gramdhan; Passports	AIADMK
11.	N. Thalavaisundaram	Minister for Public Works	Public Works; Highways; Irrigation Including Minor Irrigation	AIADMK
12.	A. Anwer Rhazza	Minister for Labour	Labour; Employment and Training; Urban and Rural Employment; Census; Wakfs	AIADMK
13.	K. Pandurangan	Minister for Rural Industries	Rural Industries including Cottage Industries; Small Scale Industries; Khadi & Village Industries Board	AIADMK
14.	S.S. Thirunavukkarasu	Minister for Information & Publicity and Forests	Information and Publicity; Film Technology; Cinematograph act; Newsprint Control; Forests; Environment; Pollution Control	AIADMK
15.	P. Dhanabal	Minister for Food and Co-operation	Food; Civil Supplies; Consumer Protection; Price Control; Statistics	AIADMK
16.	Valarmathi Jebaraj	Minister for Backward Classes	Backward Classes; Most Backward Classes and Denotified Communities	AIADMK
17.	B. Valarmathi	Minister for Social Welfare	Social Welfare including Women’s and Children’s Welfare; Nutritious Noon Meal; Welfare of the Disabled; Beggar Homes; Orphanages and Correctional Administration	AIADMK
18.	V. Subramanian	Minister for Adi Dravidar Welfare	Adi Dravidar Welfare; Hill Tribes; Bonded Labour; Welfare of Ex-Servicemen	AIADMK
19.	Nainar Nagenthran	Minister for Transport	Transport; Nationalised Transport; Motor Vehicles Act; Ports	AIADMK
20.	K.P. Raajendra Prasad	Minister for Fisheries and Animal Husbandry	Fisheries; Animal Husbandry	AIADMK
21.	C. V. Shanmugam	Minister for Commercial Taxes	Commercial Taxes	AIADMK
22.	S.P. Shanmuganathan	Minister for Handlooms and Textiles	Handlooms and Textiles	AIADMK
23.	A. K. Selvaraj	Minister for Housing and Urban Development	Housing; Housing Development; Town Planning; Slum Clearance; Accommodation Control; Urban Development and CMDA	AIADMK
24.	R. Sarojaa	Minister for Tourism	Tourism; Tourism Development Corporation	AIADMK
25.	C. Shanmugavelu	Minister for Milk and Dairy Development	Milk and Dairy Development	AIADMK
