= State Highway 84A (Tamil Nadu) =

Road in Tamil Nadu, India

State Highway 84A

Route information
- Maintained by Highways and Minor Ports Department
- Length: 61.6 km (38.3 mi)

Major junctions
- North end: Erode
- South end: Mulanur

Location
- Country: India
- State: Tamil Nadu
- Districts: Erode, Tiruppur.
- Primary destinations: Vellakoil

Highway system
- Roads in India; Expressways; National; State; Asian; State Highways in Tamil Nadu

State Highway 84A runs in Erode district and Tiruppur districts of Tamil Nadu, India. It connects the towns of Erode and Mulanur.

== Route ==
The highway passes through Modakurichi, Vilakkethi, Muthur, Vellakoil to a length of 61.6 km.

== Major junctions ==
- State Highway 84 at Solar, Erode
- Erode Ring Road at Lakkapuram
- State Highway 189 at Muthur
- National Highway NH-81 (Old NH-67) at Vellakoil
- State Highway 21 at Mulanur
