= Dharapuram =

Dharapuram Veeradapuram (historical)
- Historical Town
- Dharapuram
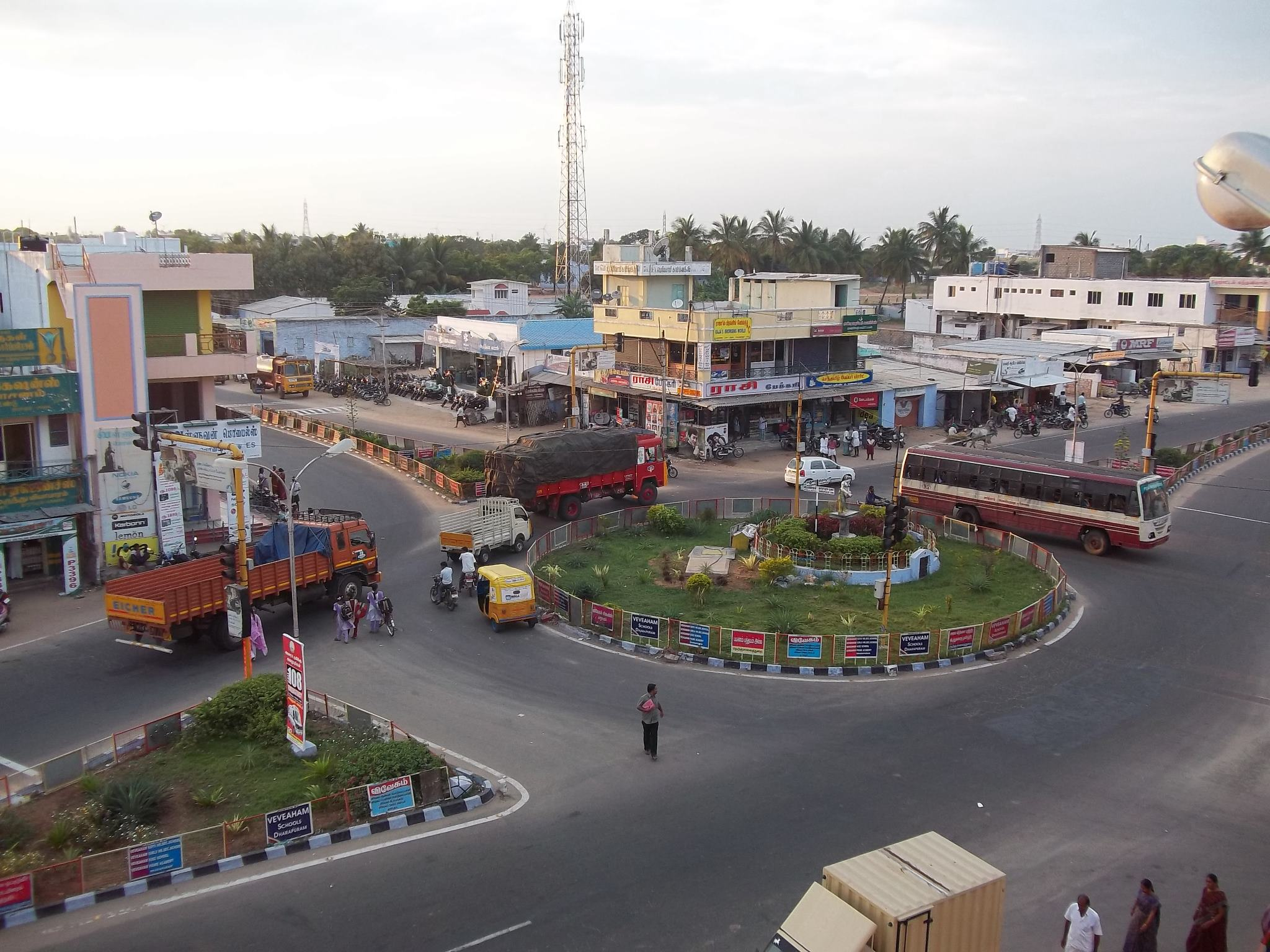
- Goddess Amaravathy Staue, mascot of Dharapuram
- Nicknames: Veeradapuram, Rajarajapuram
- Location in Tamil Nadu, India
- Coordinates: 10°43′53″N 77°31′08″E
- Country: India
- State: Tamil Nadu
- Region: Kongu Nadu
- District: Thiruppur
- Taluk: Dharapuram

Government
  - Type: Municipality
  - Body: Selection Grade Municipality
  - Rank: 3 Rd in dt
- Elevation: 240 m (790 ft)

Population (2024)
  - Total: 75,600
  - Rank: 3 rd

Languages
  - Official: Tamil, English
- Time zone: UTC+5:30 (IST)
- PIN: 638656
- STD Code: 04258
- Vehicle registration: TN 78
- Website: municipality.tn.gov.in/dharapuram/ 123.63.242.116/dharapuram/

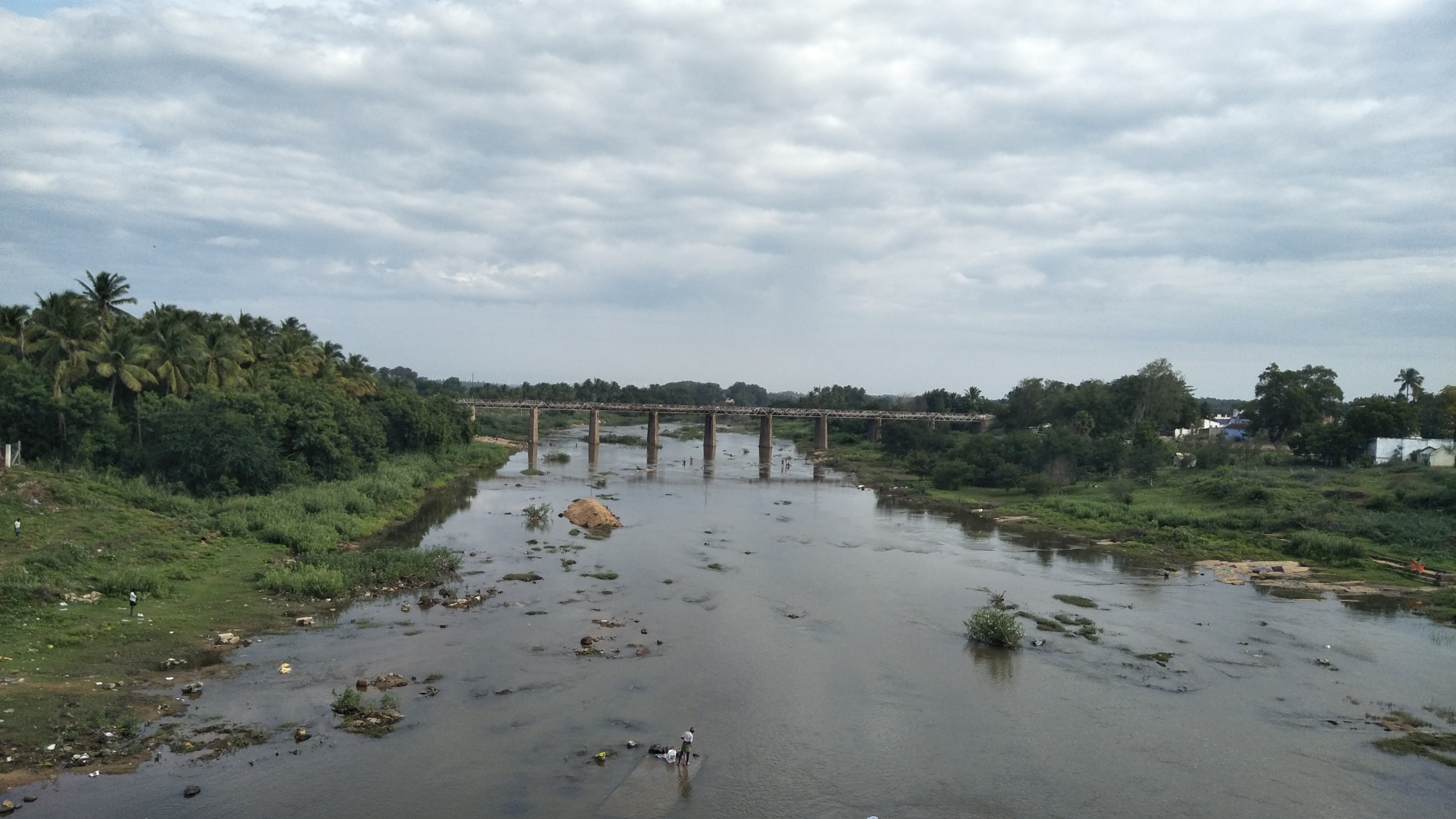
Amaravathi River

Dharapuram is a town situated along the banks of Amaravati River in Tiruppur district in the Indian state of Tamil Nadu. Dharapuram is one of the oldest towns in South India and was the capital of Kongu Nadu under the Cheras, Western Ganga Dynasty and later Kongu Cholas, at which time it was known as Veeradapuram. Amaravathi River flows through the town. As of 2011, the town had a population of 67,007. The city houses famous temples including Agatheeswarar Temple, Kaadu Hanumanthasamy temple and many other old temples.

Dharapuram Town is a small agricultural marketing centre for a large rural hinterland in the Thiruppur. The town is 50 km towards of the District Headquarters Thiruppur, 55 km towards the Pollachi, 33 km towards the Kangeyam, 75 km towards the Erode, 75 km towards the Karur, 70 km towards the Dindigul, 35 km towards the Palani and 75 km towards the industrial town Coimbatore. The nearest airport is Coimbatore International Airport located 70 km from Dharapuram.

== History ==
Dharapuram was part of the Chera kingdom until 850 CE. From 1000 to 1275 CE, the area was ruled by the Kongu Cholas under the name Vanchipuri. The Cholan capital was under attack by a hitherto unknown group in South India, called Kalabhars. As a result, the Kongu Cholas made Dharapuram their military and political headquarters. The Later Cholas named the city as Rajarajapuram. After 1276 CE, the Pandyas took control of the region. The Dehli Sultanate, Nayaks of Madurai and Vijayanagara Empire later ruled this region, followed by Hyder Ali and the Kingdom of Mysore. In 1799, when Mysore fell to the British, the East India Company took over administration of this region.

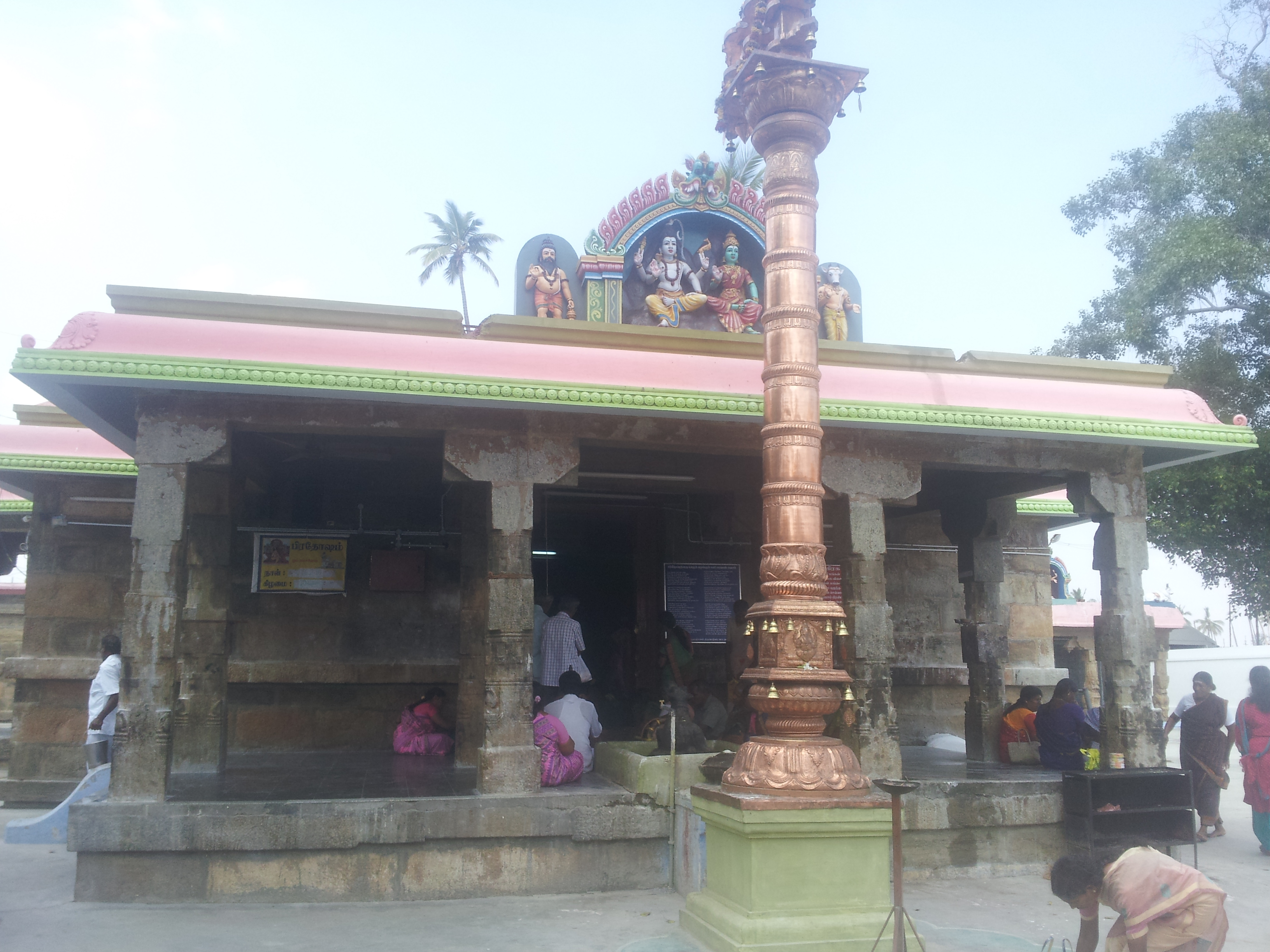
Agatheeswarar temple at Dharapuram

During British empire, Dharapuram was the capital of Noyyal South District before the formation of Coimbatore District. Bhavani Was The Capital Of Noyal North District. In 1804 Coimbatore District was formed by combining both. Dharapuram was taluk under Coimbatore district during 1804-1979. Dharapuram and Coimbatore Municipalities were established on the same day. Dharapuram attained the status of a Municipality in the year 1866 and it was promoted to first grade municipality on 9 May 1983. The town attained Municipality status in the year 1866 and was functioning as a First Grade Municipality from 9 May 1983. On 30 March 2023, it was upgraded as a Selection Grade Municipality. Development in the town completely depends on the agriculture, as well as commerce and trades.

== Demographics ==
Religious census
Religion	Percent(%)
Hindu	82.12%
Muslim	11.76%
Christian	5.74%
Other	0.37%

According to 2011 census, Dharapuram had a population of 67,007 with a sex-ratio of 1,045 females for every 1,000 males, much above the national average of 929. A total of 5,048 were under the age of six, constituting 2,566 males and 2,482 females. The average literacy of the town was 80.4%, compared to the national average of 72.99%. The town had a total of 15,842 households. This area is dominated by Kongu Vellalar Gounder community, There were a total of 23,722 workers, comprising 506 cultivators, 1,227 main agricultural laborers, 652 in house hold industries, 17,553 other workers, 3,784 marginal workers, 51 marginal cultivators, 697 marginal agricultural laborers, 204 marginal workers in household industries and 2,832 other marginal workers. As per the religious census of 2011, Dharapuram (M) had 77.12% Hindus, 16.76% Muslims, 5.74% Christians, and 0.37% following other religions.

== Geography and climate ==
Dharapuram is located at 10.73°N 77.52°E. Dharapuram town is situated along of the bank of Amaravathi River which flows from the south to north. Uppar River and dam, Nallathankal River and dam, Palar join the river Amaravathi. It has an average elevation of 45 metres or 150 feet. It is strategically located in the line of Palakkad pass which provides the wind that activates the town's numerous windmills. The area has a significant water shortage. The town has a hot semi-arid climate (Köppen BSh).

Climate data for Dharapuram
Month	Jan	Feb	Mar	Apr	May	Jun	Jul	Aug	Sep	Oct	Nov	Dec	Year
Mean daily maximum °C (°F)	29.4 (84.9)	32.9 (91.2)	33.6 (92.5)	35.2 (95.4)	36.3 (97.3)	35.1 (95.2)	32.8 (91.0)	32.7 (90.9)	32.5 (90.5)	31.1 (88.0)	30.5 (86.9)	29.0 (84.2)	32.6 (90.7)
Mean daily minimum °C (°F)	20.6 (69.1)	21.2 (70.2)	22.9 (73.2)	23.3 (73.9)	24.7 (76.5)	25.4 (77.7)	24.8 (76.6)	23.6 (74.5)	23.5 (74.3)	22.0 (71.6)	21.0 (69.8)	20.1 (68.2)	22.8 (73.0)
Average rainfall mm (inches)	14 (0.6)	11 (0.4)	22 (0.9)	43 (1.7)	65 (2.6)	34 (1.3)	21 (0.8)	31 (1.2)	50 (2.0)	134 (5.3)	138 (5.4)	44 (1.7)	607 (23.9)
Source: Dharapuram Municipality

== Economy ==
The economy of Dharapuram is mainly based on Agriculture as it is regularly supplied with water from the Amaravati River.

The predominant occupation of the town is trade and commerce. Dharapuram acts as the commercial hub for surrounding villages. Many commercial establishments and banks are located in the town. Dharapuram is the headquarters of Dharapuram taluk, and the Dharapuram Revenue division houses many government offices.

Agriculture is the main industry in Dharapuram and is the main source of employment for people around Dharapuram. Some of the main crops cultivated in this area include Coconuts, Vegetables, Maize, Millet, Paddy and Sugarcane. Most of the farmers also engage in Dairy farming. Sizeable number of farmers also engage in Poultry farming.

After agriculture, the Textile industry also provides employment to sizeable number of people. Due to the town's proximity with the textile city of Tiruppur there are some textile industries located in and around Dharapuram.

The surrounding areas have seen a surge in windmill installations because of the location of the town across the Palghat Gap.

The city also houses Seed manufacturing plants, Textile Spinning and Cotton Mills, Rice Mills, ginning factory Oil Processing Plants, Bricks, Big Lorry Market, Famous vegetables Market, Automobiles and Finance. The city also houses 500 bakeries within the radius of 5 km (3.1 mi) serving highway commuters.

In recent years due to lack of employment opportunities, a sizeable number of the town's population have been migrating to nearby industrial cities like Tiruppur and Coimbatore.

== Administration and politics ==
Dharapuram was a part of Coimbatore district, later Erode district and now Tiruppur district. Dharapuram State Assembly Constituency has been a reserved constituency since 1967. Dharapuram is part of Erode Lok Sabha constituency. N. Kayalvizhi is the present member of the Tamil Nadu Legislative Assembly from the Dharapuram constituency. Dharapuram Revenue division consists of Dharapuram taluk and Kangeyam taluk.

Dharapuram Assembly Constituency came under Pollachi (Lok Sabha constituency) until 2009. Today, it is part of Erode (Lok Sabha constituency) .

AIADMK, Indian National Congress, DMK, BJP, Tamil Nadu Kongu Ilaingar Peravai are the major political parties in this area.

== Transport ==
The following are the major highways connecting Dharapuram:

- SH-21 : Pollachi - Dharapuram - Karur
- SH-37 : Oddanchatram - Dharapuram
- SH-83 : Palani - Dharapuram
- SH-83A : Erode - Kangeyam - Dharapuram
- SH-84A : Erode - Vellakovil - Dharapuram
- SH-97 : Udumalpet - Dharapuram
- SH-153 : Dharapuram - Palani
- SH-174 : Dharapuram - Tiruppur
- SH-174A : Coimbatore - Palladam - Dharapuram

Back To Back buses are available for Tiruppur, Coimbatore, Oddanchatram (2 Minutes), Erode, Trichy, Namakkal, Theni, Tiruchengode, Kangeyam, Palani and Madurai at day time.

Also Karur, Udumalpet, Pollachi, Salem, Dindigul & South Tamil Nadu Places.

Dharapuram is connected by moffusil bus services to major towns in Tamil Nadu operated by TNSTC

Dharapuram town is not provided with railway facilities. The nearest railway stations is Palani railway station and Oddanchatram at a distance of 34 km and 35 km respectively and the nearest airport is Coimbatore International Airport (70 km). Dharapuram town is well connected with other cities and towns like Tiruppur, Coimbatore, Erode, Karur, Dindigul, Madurai, Kangeyam, Oddanchatram, Palani, Udumalpet, and Pollachi with road transport facilities.

== Places of interest ==
Agatheeswarar temple, Bhagavan Koil, Angalamman temple, Kottai Mariamman temple, Rathinamoorthy temple, Thean Easwaran temple, Periya Nachiamman temple, Konguvadukanatha Swami temple, Thillapuriamman Temple, Chakrathalvar temple, Mamangam temple, Kadu Hanumantharaya Swami temple and Angitholuvu Kaliamman temple are the major places of worship.

Apart from temples, Dharapuram was the source of the tastiest hotel - Devi Vilas. Though this hotel ceases to exist now, it was one of the most popular hotels in the 70s. It is told that the famous actor, Shri Nagesh used to work here. Also, everytime former Chief Minister MG Ramachandran came for shooting in the neighborhood, he would eat only from Devi Vilas.

== See also ==
- CSI Ellis Memorial Church
- Peramiyam
- Uthiyur
- Nallathangal Dam
- Bhagavankovil
- Kolathupalayam
- Dharapuram Lok Sabha constituency
