= S. Balakrishnan =

S. Balakrishnan may refer to:

- S. Balakrishnan (composer) (1948–2019), Indian film score composer and music director
- S. Balakrishnan (Mudukulathur MLA) (died 2006), Indian politician
- S. Balakrishnan (Modakurichi MLA), Indian politician
