= Panneerselvam ministry =

Panneerselvam ministry may refer to these cabinets headed by Indian politician O. Panneerselvam as chief minister of Tamil Nadu:

- First Panneerselvam ministry (2001–2002)
- Second Panneerselvam ministry (2014–2015)
- Third Panneerselvam ministry (2016-2017)
