= State Highway 21 (Tamil Nadu) =

Road in Tamil Nadu, India

State Highway 21

Route information
- Maintained by Highways and Minor Ports Department
- Length: 55 km (34 mi)

Major junctions
- West end: Pollachi
- East end: Dharapuram

Location
- Country: India
- State: Tamil Nadu
- Districts: Coimbatore, Tiruppur
- Primary destinations: Gudimangalam

Highway system
- Roads in India; Expressways; National; State; Asian; State Highways in Tamil Nadu

State Highway 21 runs in Coimbatore, Tiruppur of Tamil Nadu, India. It connects the towns of Pollachi and Dharapuram.

== Route ==
The highway passes through Dharapuram, Mulanur and Kannivadi to a length of 118 km.

== Major junctions ==
- National Highway 209 (Old numbering) at Pollachi
- State Highway 87 at Gudimangalam
- State Highway 37 and 83A at Dharapuram
- National Highway NH-81 (Old NH-67) near Karur
