= Peramiyam =

Peramium
- Village
- Location in Tamil Nadu, India Peramium (India)
- Coordinates: 10.80°N 77.63°E
- Country: India
- State: Tamil Nadu
- District: Tirupur

Population (2011)
  - Total: 2,899

Languages
  - Official: Tamil
- Time zone: UTC+5:30 (IST)
- PIN: 638661
- Telephone code: 91 4202

Peramium or Peramiyam is a village and a panchayat near Dharapuram and Mulanur in Tirupur district in the state of Tamil Nadu, India.

== History ==
Peramium stands on the banks of the holy river Amaravati, a tributary of the Kaveri River.

Every year in January (the month of Thai in the Tamil year), the 'Thai Pusam' festival for Maakaali Amman temple is celebrated by devotees. There is also an annual Kamachi Amman temple and Bajanai Mada temple festival.

Dharapuram was under the regimes of Chera kings in 850 A.D. Thereafter (in 1000 A.D. – 1275 A.D.) this place came under the rule of Cholas with Dharapuram as their Headquarters. Subsequently, it came under the control of Padiars (from 1276 A.D.). Only during this period, a ruler by name Veerapandian caused the digging of Kalingarayan Channel. Then the Muslims (Sultans) took over the rule after which Nayaks of Madurai ruled. Then Hyder Ali and Tippu Sultan held sway.

- In 1799 when Tippu fell to the British, the East Indian Company took over the administration. It is famous for its Aanjaneya temple. In ancient times Dharapuram was called 'Viradapura' which has significant links to Mahabharat.

== Demographics ==
Peramium has a population of 2,899 of which 1,471 are males while 1,428 are females, according to Census India 2011. The literacy rate of Peramium is 61.5%, lower than the state average of 80.09%.

== Geography ==
Peramium is located 64 km towards East from the district headquarters Tirupur .

== Schools ==
- Government High School, Peramium.

== Temples ==
The following temples are in Peramium:

- Maakaali amman Temple
- Bagavathi amman Temple
- Eswaran Temple (Ootai Pillayar kovil)
- Ezhuvaramman Temple
- Kamachi amman Temple
- Bajanai madam Temple

There were many temples near to Peramium.

- Annanmar alayam Temple
- Pandudhagara samy Temple
- Varadharaja Perumal Temple
- Periyanayagi Amman Temple
- Aruvasamy Temple
- Neelampur Kaliamman Temple

== Economy ==
- Agriculture
- Rice Mills
- Poultry

== Transport ==
- Peramium is 15 km from Dharapuram, 11 km from Mulanur and 22 km from Vellakovil.
- Govt Buses are available from Dharapuram, Mulanur and Vellakovil.
