= Third Jayalalithaa ministry =

Government of Tamil Nadu, India (2002–2006)

- 13th Ministry of Tamil Nadu

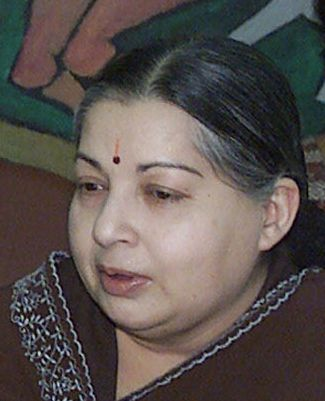
- Date formed: 2 March 2002
- Date dissolved: 12 May 2006

People and organisations
- Head of state: Governor P. S. Ramamohan Rao
- Head of government: J. Jayalalithaa
- Member parties: AIADMK
- Status in legislature: Majority
- Opposition party: DMK
- Opposition leader: K. Anbazhagan

History
- Election: 2001
- Legislature term: 5 Years
- Predecessor: First Panneerselvam ministry
- Successor: Fifth Karunanidhi ministry

As O. Panneerselvam who was Chief Minister from 2 March 2002 resigned, Governor appointed J. Jayalalithaa as the Chief Minister to head the New Government and appointed 26 more ministers on the same day. It was her return to power as she had removed from the post earlier on 21 September 2001.

== Cabinet ministers ==
S.no	Name	Designation	Portfolios	Party
Chief Minister
1.	J. Jayalalithaa	Chief Minister	Public; Home; Police; Indian Administrative Service; Indian Police Service; other All India Services; General Administration; District Revenue Officers	AIADMK
Cabinet Ministers
2.	O. Panneerselvam	Minister for Public Works, Prohibition and Excise and Revenue	Public Works; Highways; Irrigation including Minor Irrigation; Prohibition & Excise; Molasses; Prevention of Corruption and Prisons *Revenue; District Revenue Establishment; Deputy Collectors; Registration, Stamp Act; Stationery & Printing; Government Press; Bhoodhan & Gramdhan; Passports	AIADMK
3.	C. Ponnaiyan	Minister for Finance	Finance; Planning; Legislative Assembly and Elections; Legislation; Weights and Measures; Debt Relief including Legislation on *money lending; Chits; Registration of Companies	AIADMK
4.	D. Jayakumar	Minister for Law and Information Technology	Law and Courts; Information Technology	AIADMK
5.	Pollachi V. Jayaraman	Minister for Food and Co-operation	Food; Civil Supplies; Consumer Protection; Price Control; Co-operation; Statistics	AIADMK
6.	P.C. Ramasamy	Minister for Hindu Religious and Charitable Endowments	Hindu Religious and Charitable Endowments	AIADMK
7.	P. Vijayalakshmi Palanisamy	Minister for Social Welfare	Social Welfare including Women's and Children's Welfare; Nutritious Noon Meal; Welfare of the Disabled; Beggar Homes; Orphanages and Correctional Administration	AIADMK
8.	N. Thalavaisundaram	Minister for Health	Health; Medical Education; Family Welfare.	AIADMK
9.	B. Valarmathi	Minister for Rural Industries	Rural Industries including Cottage Industries; Small Scale Industries; Khadi & Village Industries Board	AIADMK
10.	C. Karuppasamy	Minister for Adi Dravidar Welfare	Adi Dravidar Welfare; Hill Tribes; Bonded Labour; Welfare of Ex-Servicemen	AIADMK
11.	R. Viswanathan	Minister for Transport and Electricity	Transport; Nationalised Transport; Motor Vehicles Act; Ports; Electricity; Non-Conventional Energy Development	AIADMK
12.	Nainar Nagenthran	Minister for Industries	Industries; Iron and Steel Control; Mines and Minerals; Electronics	AIADMK
13.	K. Pandurangan	Minister for Agriculture	Agriculture; Agricultural Engineering; Agro Service Co-operatives; Horticulture; Sugarcane Cess and Sugarcane *Development	AIADMK
14.	S. M. Velusamy	Minister for Backward Classes	Backward Classes; Most Backward Classes and Denotified Communities	AIADMK
15.	P. V. Damodaran	Minister for Animal Husbandry	Animal Husbandry	AIADMK
16.	R. Vaithilingam	Minister for Forests and Environment	Forests; Environment; Pollution Control	AIADMK
17.	Anitha R. Radhakrishnan	Minister for Housing and Urban Development	Housing; Housing Development; Town Planning; Slum Clearance; Accommodation Control; Urban Development and CMDA	AIADMK
18.	C. V. Shanmugam	Minister for Education, Commercial Taxes, Sports and Youth Welfare	Education; Technical Education; Science and Technology; Archaeology; Tamil Development and Tamil Culture; Indians Overseas; Refugees and Evacuees; Commercial Taxes; Sports and Youth Welfare	AIADMK
19.	S. Ramachandran	Minister for Dairy Development	Milk and Dairy Development	AIADMK
20.	V. Somasundaram	Minister for Handlooms and Textiles	Handlooms and Textiles	AIADMK
21.	M. Radakrishnan	Minister for Fisheries	Fisheries	AIADMK
22.	A. Miller	Minister for Tourism	Tourism; Tourism Development Corporation	AIADMK
23.	P. Annavi	Minister for Labour	Labour; Employment and Training; Urban and Rural Employment; Census; Wakfs	AIADMK
24.	K. P. Anbalagan	Minister for Information, Publicity and Local Administration	Information and Publicity; Film Technology and Cinematograph Act *Newsprint Control; Municipal Administration; Rural Development; Panchayats and Panchayat Unions; Poverty Alleviation Programmes; Rural Indebtedness; Urban and Rural Water Supply	AIADMK

== Gallery ==
Third Jayalalithaa cabinet

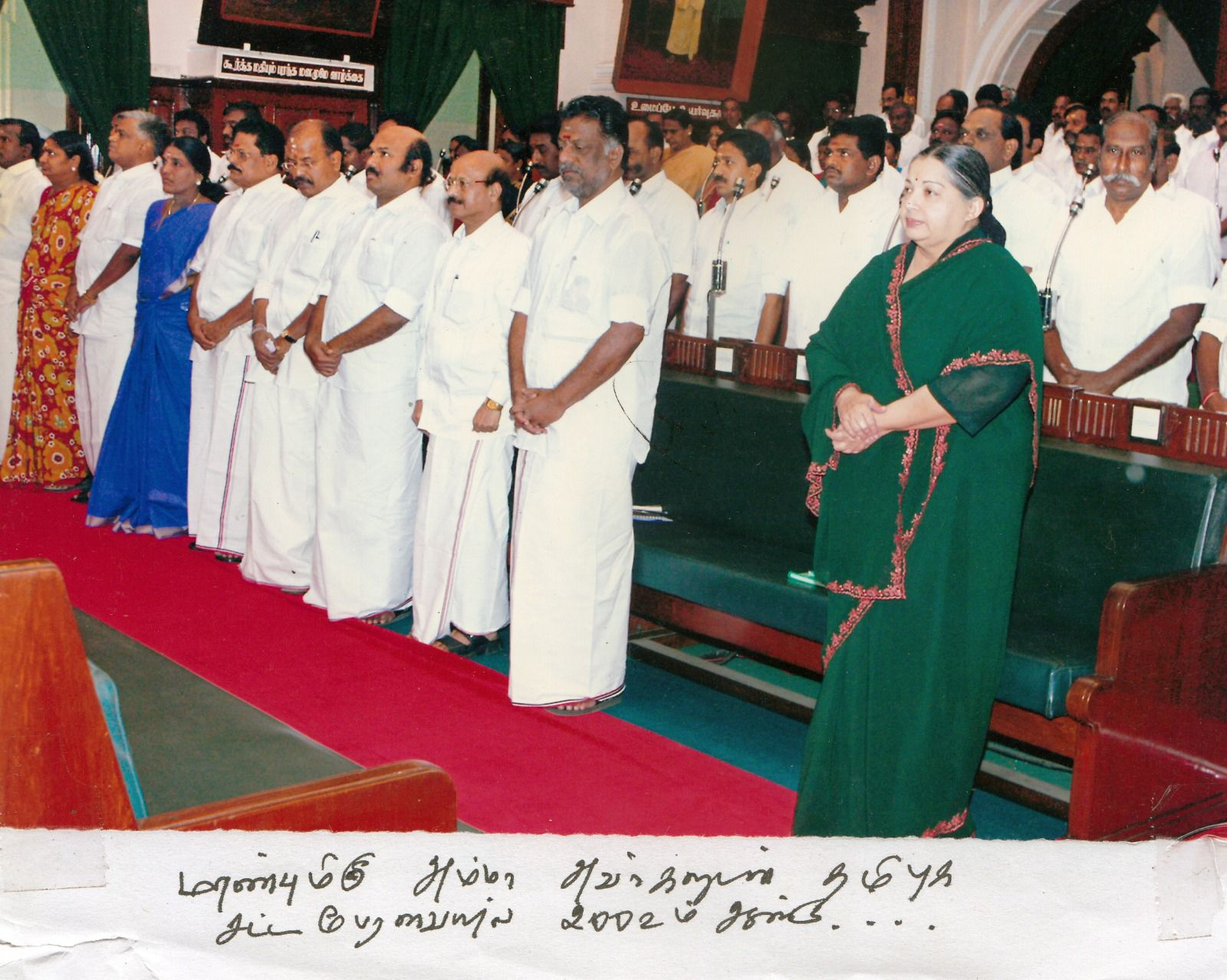
Chief Minister Jayalalithaa along with othet council of ministers in the treachery benches of Tamil Nadu Assembly
