= CSI Ellis Memorial Church =

- C.S.I. Ellis Memorial Church

- Location within Tamil Nadu
- 10.7376°N 77.5435°E
- Location: Dharapuram, Tamil Nadu
- Country: India
- Denomination: Church of South India

History
- Former name: Ellis Memorial Church
- Founder: Rev. J.J. Ellis (JJE)

Architecture
- Functional status: Active
- Heritage designation: National Shrine
- Style: Gothic

Specifications
- Length: 64 metres (210 ft)
- Width: 12.2 metres (40 ft)

Ellis Memorial Church is a church affiliated with the Church of South India in the CSI Compound, Dharapuram (Tamil Nadu), India. It was built in the 19th century by Rev. J. J. Ellis and rebuilt again with the status of a cathedral by the British in 1893. It was designed in the Neo-Gothic style favoured by British architects of the late 19th-century.

== History ==
Reverend Ellis (also known as J.J.) built the C.S.I. Ellis Memorial Church in 1929.

In 1813, Methodist people entered the southern part of India by sea, and on February 22, 1913, Mr. Man from Perunkarunai paalayam (near Kaangayam) first accepted Christianity. Now, the congregation is celebrating the 100th year of Gospel in southern India and is preparing to build a Church in Perunkarunai Paalayam. This church is attracting many Christians from nearby areas, and is indeed one of the most important churches during British rule in India according to Historians. This presented an opportunity for the local village, including children, to study English. When Rev. J.J. Ellis left for village visits (generally around 2 pm), Dr. C. Ranjith Dev Inbaseelan would prepare tea and supper picnics which went on until 2 in the morning. Ellis was always up again by 5 a.m. for his essential quiet-time.

After that, Dr Anne Booth Mission Hospital was started in the name of Dr. Anne Booth. It was built mainly for the poor and needy. The theme of daily devotions, held in the hospital chapel, was "Healing the Broken and the Wounded", which was given by the Christian Medical Association of India.

The congregation conducted the healing sermon on Sunday in collaboration with the local C S I Ellis Memorial Church. The presbyter is in charge of leading the opening prayer in the first and the second service. The rest of the service was led by the Staff of C. S. I., Dr. Anne Booth Mission Hospital, C. S. I. School Of Nursing, and The Bishops College Of Nursing. The congregation attended these services consisting of the Reverend, Mr.S.Benzly Solomon Raj (the D.C.C. Chairperson), Rev. C.John Dawson (Presbyter), Mr.S.Ilango (Secretary), Mr.S.John Wesley (Treasurer).

The sermon on "Healing the Broken and the Wounded" was given by Medical Officer Dr D. Pethuru, MD (Comm. Med). He challenged the congregation to actively participate in the healing sermon of the Diocese. Special songs were given by the Hospital choir. A small gist of the infrastructures and facilities were available in the hospital.

The hospital was financially self-sufficient as of August 2006, and was given spiritual training regularly to cater to the spiritual need of the patients. The second offertory was taken in both the services for the expenses of Gospel work of the hospital and the spiritual development of the staff.

This is a branch of the CSI Mission General Hospital which is located in Prayer, Tiruchirappalli.

== Gallery ==
Rev. J. J. Ellis and Family

Gospel Starts spreading in Dharapuram

Recent photograph of the Church 'Front View'

Straight view of the Church
