= Third Karunanidhi ministry =

Government of Tamil Nadu, India (1989–1991)

- 8th Ministry of Tamil Nadu

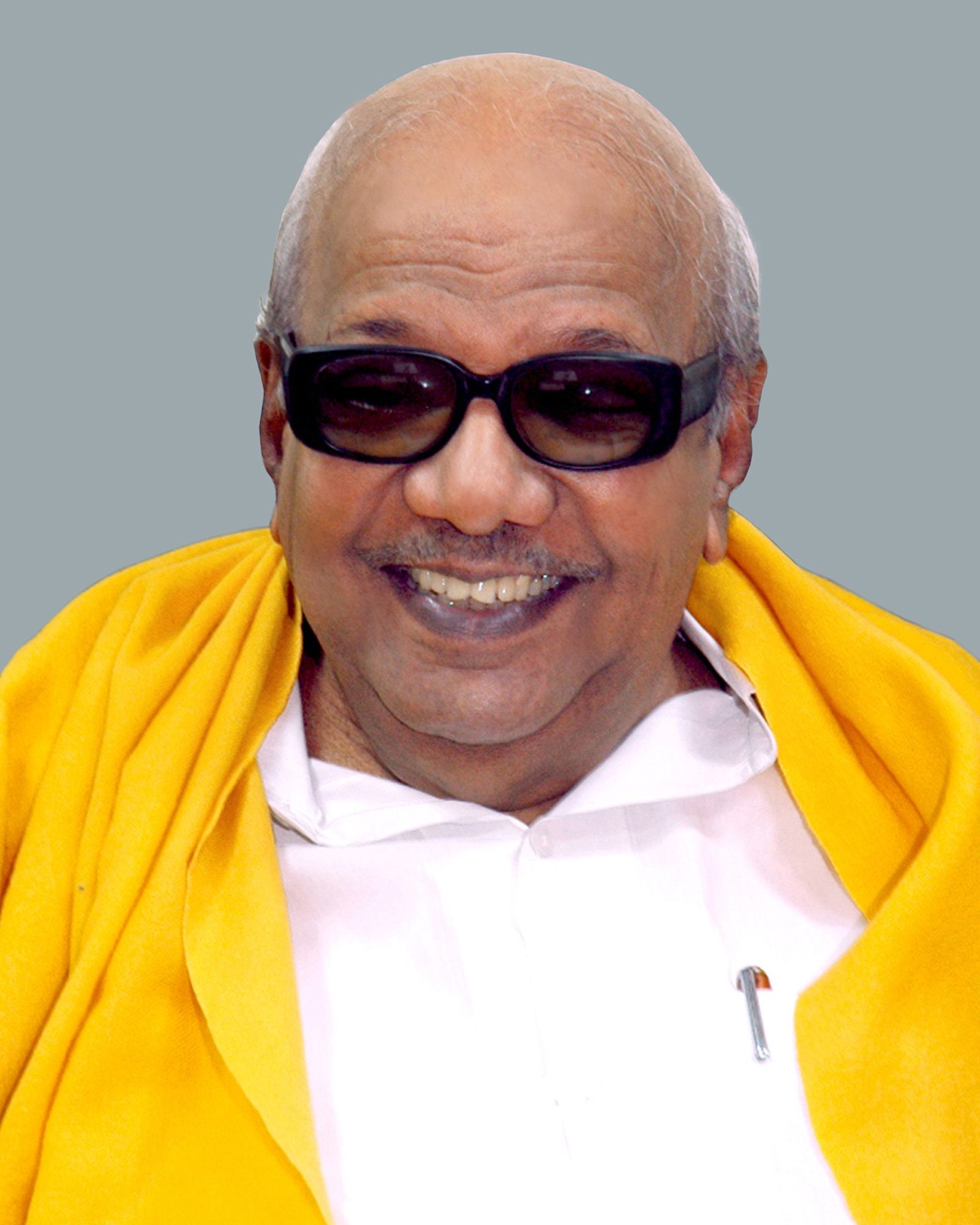
- M. Karunanidhi
- Date formed: 27 January 1989
- Date dissolved: 30 January 1991

People and organisations
- Head of state: Governor P. C. Alexander
- Head of government: M. Karunanidhi
- Member parties: DMK
- Status in legislature: Majority
- Opposition party: AIADMK(1989 - 90) INC(1990)
- Opposition leader: J. Jayalalithaa (9 February 1989 - 1 December 1989); S. R. Eradha (1 December 1989 - 19 January 1991); G. K. Moopanar (19 January 1991 - 30 January 1990)

History
- Election: 1989
- Legislature term: 5 Years
- Predecessor: V. N. Janaki ministry
- Successor: First Jayalalithaa ministry

After the General Elections held in January 1989 the Governor appointed M. Karunanidhi as Chief Minister heading the new Government with effect from 27 January 1989. The Governor on the advice of Chief Minister appointed 16 more Ministers on the same day.

== Cabinet ministers ==
S.no	Name	Designation	Party
Chief Minister
1.	M. Karunanidhi	Chief Minister • Minister for Finance	DMK
Cabinet Ministers
2.	K. Anbazhagan	Minister for Education	DMK
3.	S. J. Sadiq Pasha	Minister for Law	DMK
4.	Nanjil K. Manoharan	Minister for Revenue	DMK
5.	M. Kannappan	Minister for Transport	DMK
6.	K. P. Kandasamy	Minister for Hindu Religious and Charitable Endowments	DMK
7.	Ko. Si. Mani	Minister for Rural Development and Local Administration	DMK
8.	Pon. Muthuramalingam	Minister for Food and Co-operation	DMK
9.	Veerapandy S. Arumugam	Minister for Agriculture	DMK
10.	Durai Murugan	Minister for Public Works	DMK
11.	Subbulakshmi Jagadeesan	Minister for Social Welfare and Rural Industries	DMK
12.	K. Ponmudy	Minister for Public Health	DMK
13.	K. N. Nehru	Minister for Information and Labour	DMK
14.	S. Thangavelu	Minister for Handlooms and Urban Development	DMK
15.	K. Chandrasekaran	Minister for Animal Husbandry	DMK
16.	K. Sundaram	Minister for Adi Dravidar Welfare	DMK
