= P. C. Ramasami =

Indian politician

P. C. Ramasami was elected to the Tamil Nadu Legislative Assembly from the Modakkurichi constituency in the 2001 election. He was a candidate of the All India Anna Dravida Munnetra Kazhagam (AIADMK) party. He was also appointed as Hindu Religious Affairs Minister during Jayalalithaa's Chief minister ship between (2001–2006). Then in 2006 Election initially he was announced as candidate of AIADMK in Modakkurichi, later he was replaced by Auditor V. P. Namachivayam.
