= Fourth Karunanidhi ministry =

Government of Tamil Nadu, India (1996–2001)

- 10th Ministry of Tamil Nadu

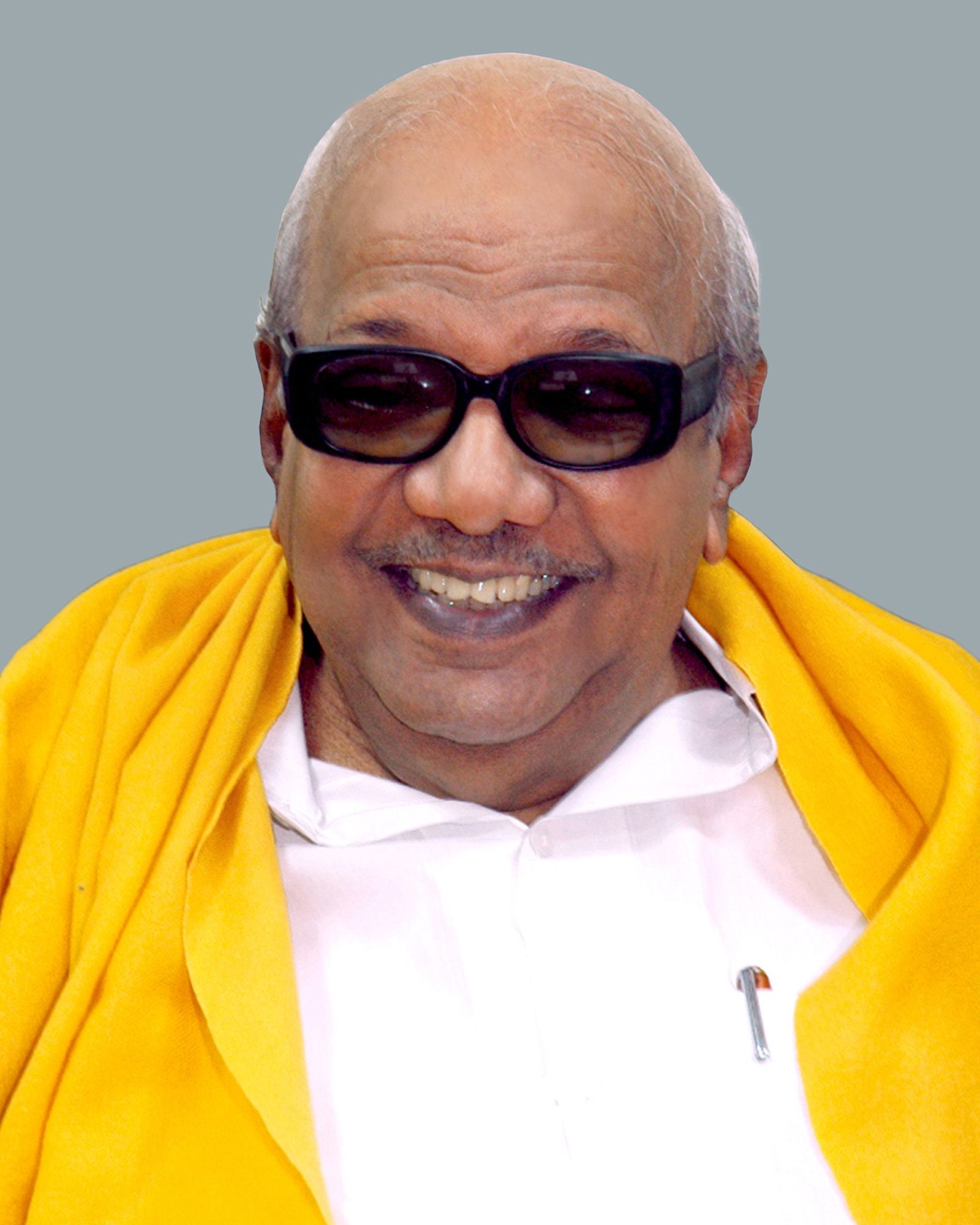
- M. Karunanidhi
- Date formed: 13 May 1996
- Date dissolved: 13 May 2001

People and organisations
- Head of state: Governor Marri Chenna Reddy
- Head of government: M. Karunanidhi
- Member parties: DMK
- Status in legislature: Majority
- Opposition party: TMC
- Opposition leader: S. Balakrishnan

History
- Election: 1996
- Legislature term: 5 Years
- Predecessor: First Jayalalithaa ministry
- Successor: Second Jayalalithaa ministry

Consequent to the General Elections held on 27 April 1996 and 2 May 1996 the Governor appointed M. Karunanidhi as Chief Minister of Tamil Nadu with effect from 13 May 1996. The Governor on the advice of the Chief Minister appointed Twenty-five more Ministers on the same day.

== Cabinet ministers ==
S.no	Name	Designation	Party
Chief Minister
1.	M. Karunanidhi	Chief Minister *Minister for Finance	DMK
Cabinet Ministers
2.	K. Anbazhagan	Minister for Education	DMK
3.	Arcot N. Veerasamy	Minister for Health and Electricity	DMK
4.	Ko. Si. Mani	Minister for Rural Development and Local Administration	DMK
5.	Veerapandi S. Arurmugam	Minister for Agriculture	DMK
6.	Duraimurugan	Minister for Public Works	DMK
7.	K. Ponmudy	Minister for Transport and Labour	DMK
8.	Pasumpon Tha. Kiruttinan	Minister for Highways and Tamil Language & Culture	DMK
9.	K.N. Nehru	Minister for Food, PDS and Co-operation	DMK
10.	K. Sundaram	Minister for Milk	DMK
11.	A. Rahman Khan	Minister for Revenue	DMK
12.	Aladi Aruna	Minister for Law	DMK
13.	N.K.K. Periasamy	Minister for Handlooms	DMK
14.	M.R.K. Panneerselvam	Minister for Backward Classes	DMK
15.	Pongalur N. Palanisamy	Minister for Sports and Youth Service Corps	DMK
16.	K. Pitchandi	Minister for Housing	DMK
17.	I. Periyasamy	Minister for Rural Industries and Registration	DMK
18.	Pulavar Senguttuvan	Minister for Animal Husbandry and Hindu Religious & Charitable Endowments	DMK
19.	S.P. Sarkuna Pandian	Minister for Social Welfare	DMK
20.	Samayanallur S. Selvarasu	Minister for Adi Dravidar and Tribal Welfare	DMK
21.	Thangapandian	Minister for Commercial Taxes	DMK
22.	N. Suresh Rajan	Minister for Information and Tourism	DMK
23.	Andhiyur P. Selvarasu	Minister for Khadi	DMK
24.	Jenefer Chandran	Minister for Fisheries	DMK
25.	V. Mullaivendhan	Minister for Information and Publicity	DMK
