= Nallathangal Dam =

Dam in Tamil Nadu, India

- Location within Tamil Nadu
- Official name: Nallathangaal Dam
- Country: India
- Location: Ponnivadi Panchayat, Dharapuram
- Coordinates: 10°42′39″N 77°36′27″E
- Status: Operational
- Opening date: 2007
- Construction cost: 44 Crores (approx)

Dam and spillways
- Type of dam: Embankment
- Height: 30 m (98 ft)
- Length: 3,450 m (11,320 ft)

Reservoir
- Total capacity: 6,660,000 m^{3} (5,400 acre⋅ft)

Nallathangal Dam is a dam Near Dharapuram in Tirupur district of Tamil Nadu, south India.

== Construction ==
The dam was constructed of across the Nallathangal odai near bhagavan kovil, Dharapuram Taluk in the year 2007. It is 12 km away from Dharapuram town.
