= Bhagavan Kovil =

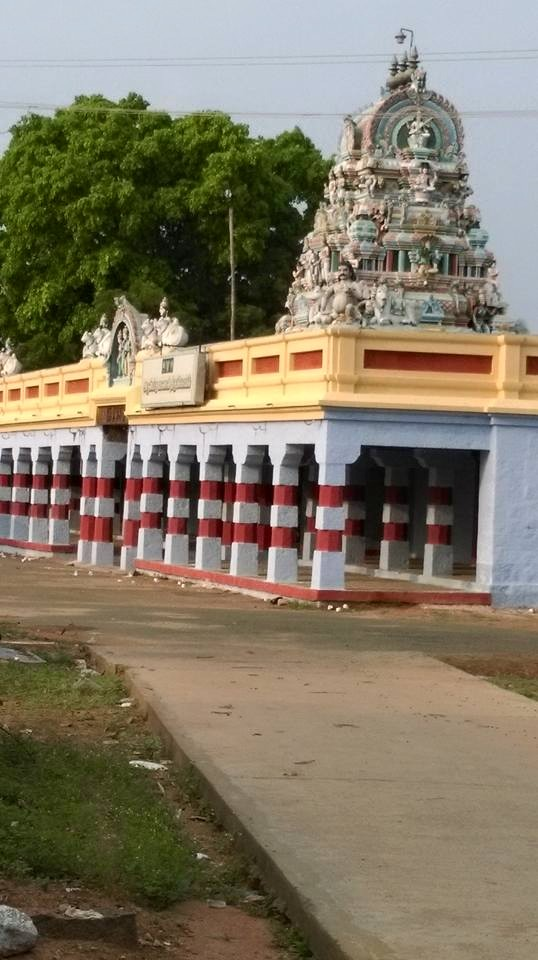
- Bhagavan Kovil

- Location in Tamil Nadu

Religion
- Affiliation: Hinduism
- District: Tirupur
- Deity: Bhagavan Thirumalaiswamy
- Festival: Ugadi

Location
- Location: Bhagavankovil. Dharapuram
- State: Tamil Nadu
- Country: India
- Interactive map of Bhagavan Kovil
- Coordinates: 10°42′54″N 77°38′33″E

Architecture
- Creator: Aadhi Gounder.
- Completed: 19th century AD

Website
- http://www.bhagavankovil.tinfo.in/

Bhagavan Kovil is a Vishnu temple located near Dharapuram of Tirupur district in the Indian state of Tamil Nadu. It is a Vaishnavite temple dedicated to Lord ThirumalaiSamy. This temple is best known for the Ugadi festival which falls on Indian summer months of March or April and precisely on the Telugu new year day called Ugadi. This temple gets visitors in lakhs during the world-famous festival. There is tourist attraction near this place, Nallathangal Dam is located 4 km from Bhagavan kovil.

== Geography ==
The temple is located at 10°42′58″N 77°39′1″E

== Transport ==
The temple is less than 14 km from Dharapuram. The nearest railway station is Tiruppur railway station located 64 km. The nearest airport is Coimbatore International Airport located 92 km from this place.

== Gallery ==
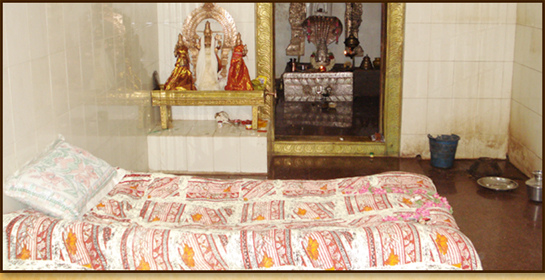
Inside of the Bhagavan Thirumalaiswamy Temple

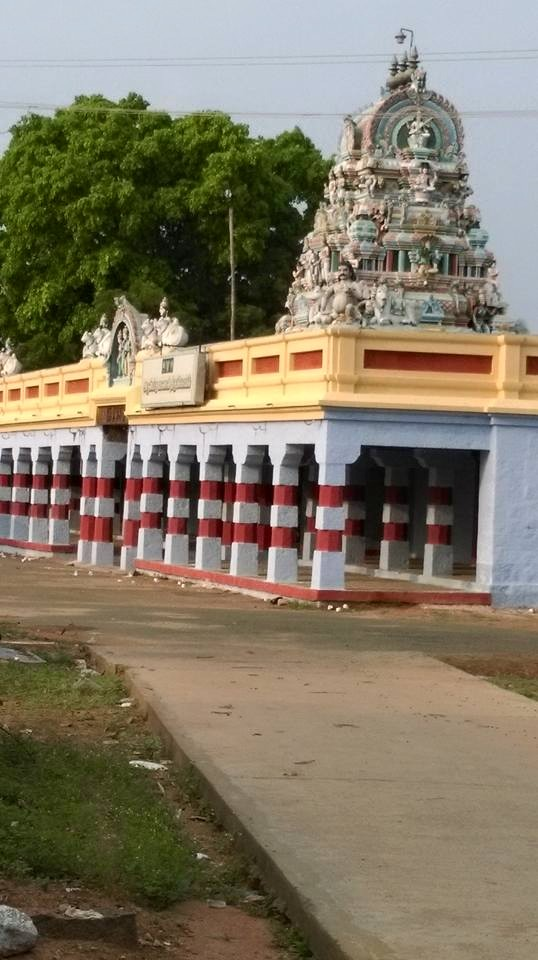
Bhagavan Kovil.

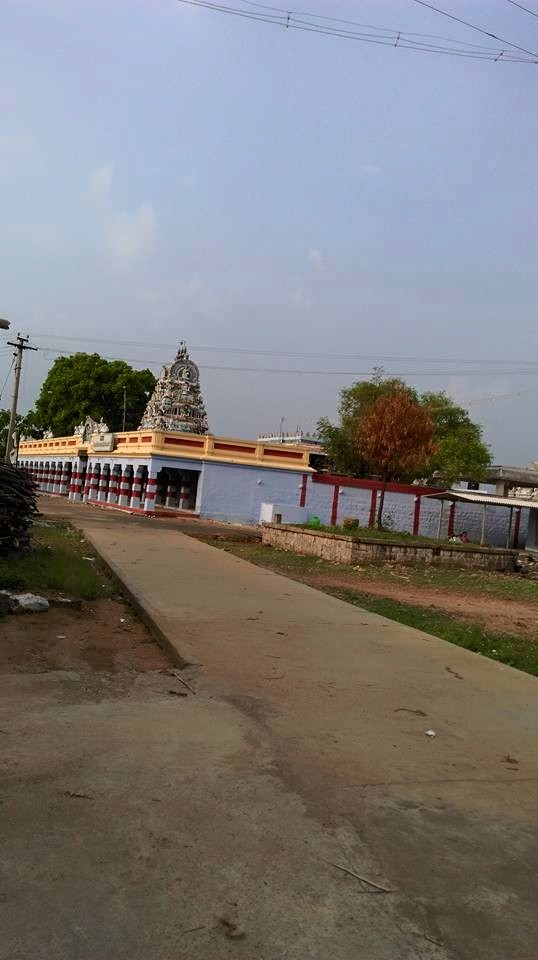
Side View of Bhagavan Kovil near Dharapuram.

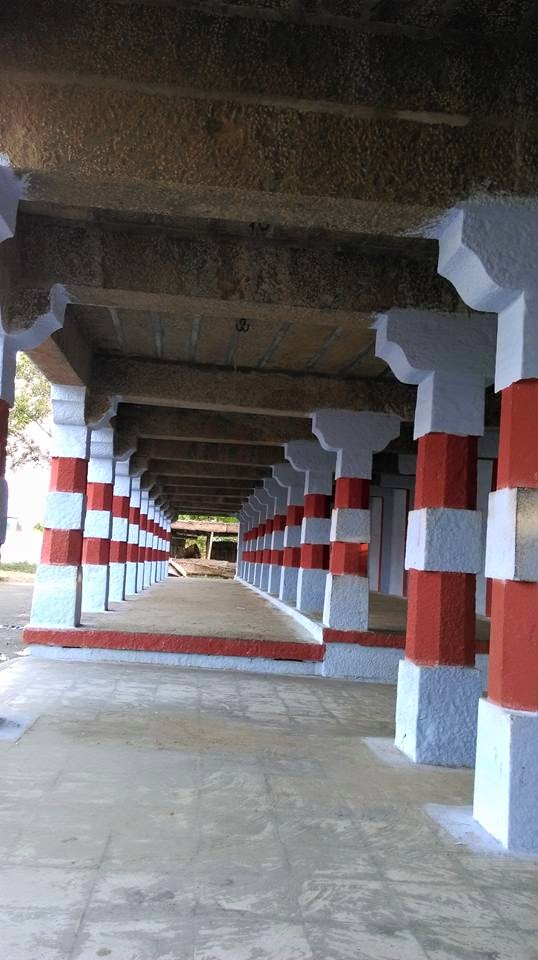
Mandap of Bhagavan Kovil.
