= D. Shanmugan =

Indian politician (born 1969)

Duraisamy Shanmugan (born 1969) is an Indian politician from Tamil Nadu. He is a member of the Tamil Nadu Legislative Assembly from the Modakkurichi Assembly constituency in Erode district representing the Tamilaga Vettri Kazhagam.

Shanmugan is from Erode, Tamil Nadu. He is the son of Duraisamy. He did his B.E. in civil engineering at Vinayaka Engineering College, Salem in 2008. He runs a construction company. He declared assets worth Rs. 37 crore in his affidavit with the Election Commission of India.

== Career ==
Shanmugan won the Modakkurichi Assembly constituency representing the Tamilaga Vettri Kazhagam in the 2026 Tamil Nadu Legislative Assembly election. He polled 60,715 votes and defeated his nearest rival, S. Krithika of the Bharatiya Janata Party, by a margin of 2,430 votes.
