= V. P. Sivasubramani =

Indian politician

V. P. Sivasubramani is an Indian politician who was a member of the Tamil Nadu Legislative Assembly. He represented Modakuruchi Constituency, Erode district between the years 2016 and 2021. He was also the District General Secretary of AIADMK and Joint Secretary of all World MGR Forum.

Year	constituency	Party	Votes	Percentage (%)
2016	Modakkurichi	AIADMK	77,067	43.62
