= R. N. Kittusamy =

Indian politician

- ஆர். என். கிட்டுசாமி

Member of Legislative Assembly
- In office 2011–2016
- Preceded by: R M Palanisamy
- Succeeded by: V P Sivasubramani
- Constituency: Modakkurichi

Personal details
- Born: 16 September 1957 (age 68) Palliyuthu, Erode, Tamil Nadu
- Party: All India Anna Dravida Munnetra Kazhagam
- Spouse: K.Chandrakala
- Children: 2
- Profession: Agriculturalist, Politician

R. N. Kittusamy is an Indian politician from Tamil Nadu. He represents the Anna Dravida Munnetra Kazhagam party. He was the member of the Tamil Nadu Legislative Assembly from the Modakurichi constituency.

Kittusamy was the chairman of Erode Central Co-operative Bank during 1994-96 and has been secretary of the Erode district unit of the party labour wing since 2006. He has been appointed as Erode (Urban) district AIADMK secretary on 22 December 2013.
