= R. M. Palanisami =

Indian politician

R. M. Palanisami was elected to the Tamil Nadu Legislative Assembly from the Modakkurichi constituency in the 2006 elections. He was a candidate of the Indian National Congress (INC) party.
