= First Jayalalithaa ministry =

Government of Tamil Nadu, India (1991–96)

- 9th Ministry of Tamil Nadu

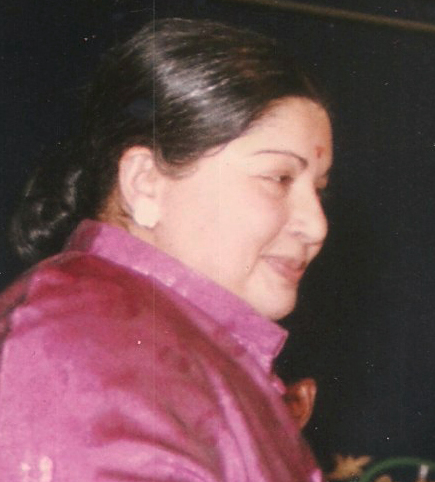
- J. Jayalalithaa
- Date formed: 24 June 1991
- Date dissolved: 12 May 1996

People and organisations
- Head of state: Governor Bhishma Narain Singh
- Head of government: J. Jayalalithaa
- Member parties: AIADMK
- Status in legislature: Majority
- Opposition party: INC
- Opposition leader: S. R. Balasubramaniam

History
- Election: 1991
- Legislature term: 5 Years
- Predecessor: Third Karunanidhi ministry
- Successor: Fourth Karunanidhi ministry

As the General Elections held on 15 June 1991 resulted in victory of AIADMK, the Governor appointed J. Jayalalithaa as Chief Minister to head the new Government with effect from 24 June 1991. The Governor on the advice of the Chief Minister appointed 17 more Ministers on the same day.

== Cabinet ministers ==
S.no	Name	Designation	Party
Chief Minister
1.	J. Jayalalithaa	Chief Minister	AIADMK
Cabinet Ministers
2.	Dr. V.R. Nedunchezhian	Minister for Finance	AIADMK
3.	S.D. Somasundaram	Minister for Revenue and Law	AIADMK
4.	R. M. Veerappan	Minister of Education and Youth Welfare	AIADMK
5.	S. Muthusamy	Minister for Health	AIADMK
6.	K.A. Sengottaiyan	Minister for Transport and Forests	AIADMK
7.	E. Madhusudhanan	Minister for Food	AIADMK
8.	S. Kannappan	Minister for Public Works	AIADMK
9.	S. Regupathy	Minister for Housing and Urban Development	AIADMK
10	Durai Ramasamy	Minister for Rural Industries	AIADMK
11.	Ku. Pa. Krishnan	Minister for Agriculture	AIADMK
12	D. Janardhanan	Minister for Milk and Dairy Development	AIADMK
13	V. Sathiamoorthy	Minister for Commercial Taxes	AIADMK
14	M. Chinnasamy	Minister for Industries	AIADMK
15	Pulavar R. Indira Kumari	Minister for Social Welfare and Handloom & Textiles	AIADMK
16	K. Lawrence	Minister for Backward Classes	AIADMK
17	M. Thennavan	Minister for Information and Publicity	AIADMK
17.	K. Ponnusamy		AIADMK
18.	Melur A.M. Paramasivan	Minister for Labour	AIADMK
19.	C.P. Pattabiraman	Minister for Co-operation	AIADMK
20.	T.M.Selvaganapathy	Minister for Local Administration	AIADMK
21.	M. Anandan	Minister for Adi Dravidar Welfare	AIADMK
22.	D. Jayakumar	Minister for Fisheries	AIADMK
23.	S. Nagoormeeran	Minister for Tourism	AIADMK
24.	P. Eswaramurthi	Minister for Khadi	AIADMK
25.	M. C. Dhamotharan	Minister for Animal Husbandry	AIADMK
26.	M. Ammamuthu Pillai	Minister for Hindu Religious and Charitable Endowments	AIADMK

== Gallery ==
First Jayalalithaa cabinet

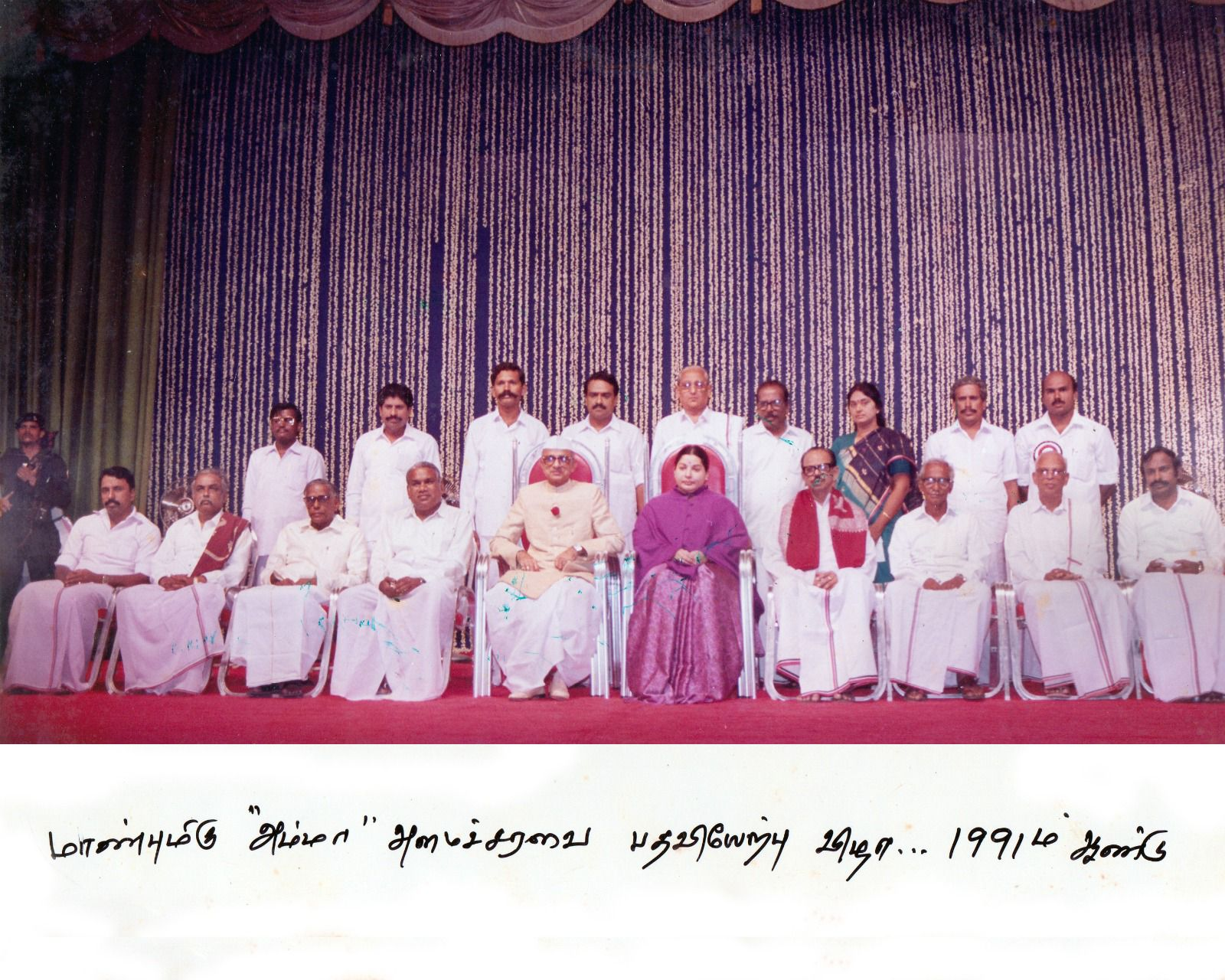
Swearing in ceremony of Jayalalithaa led Cabinet on 24 June 1991 at University of Madras Centenary Auditorium.

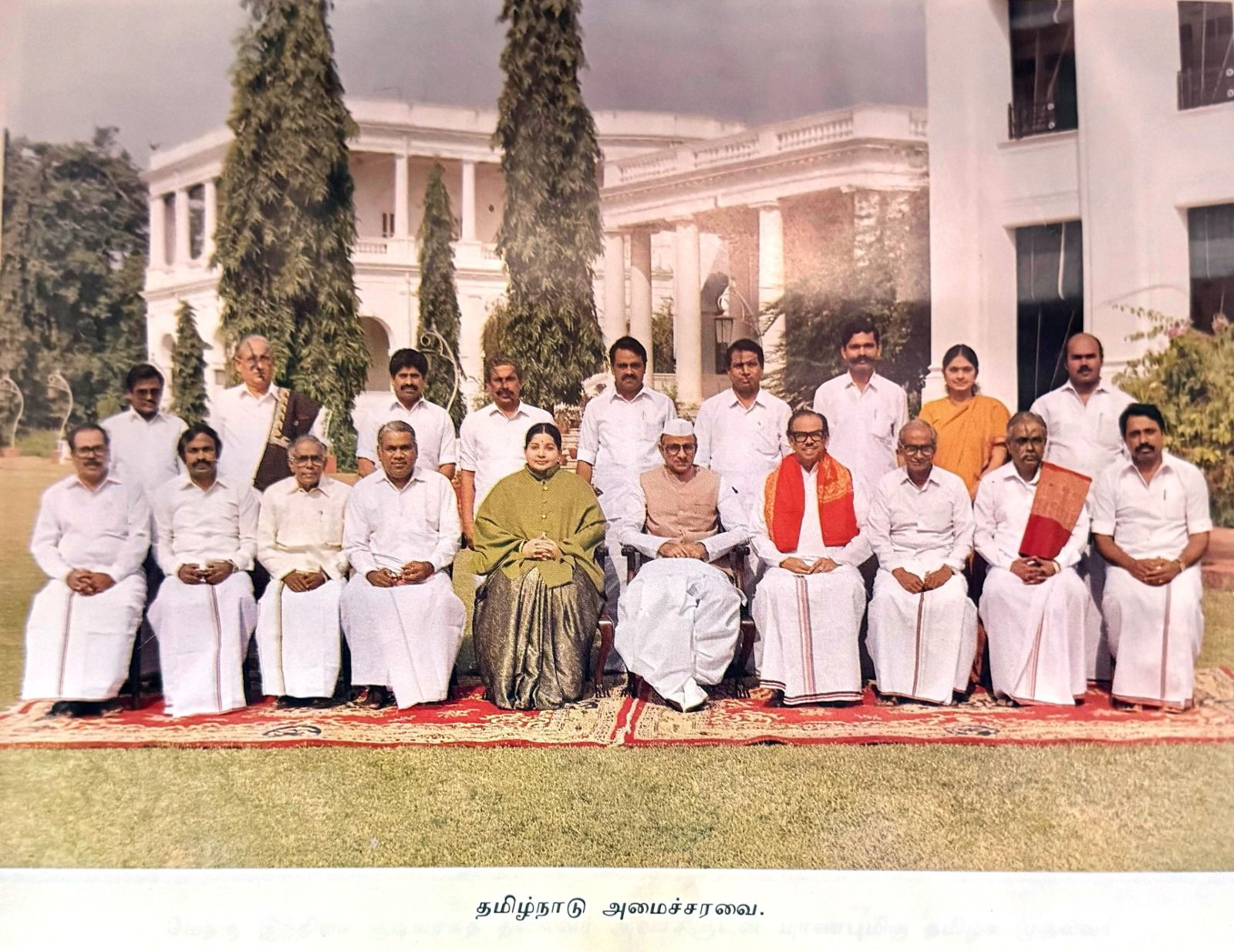
Chief Minister Jayalalithaa and Council of Ministers along with Governor Bhishma Narain Singh at Raj Bhavan in 1991

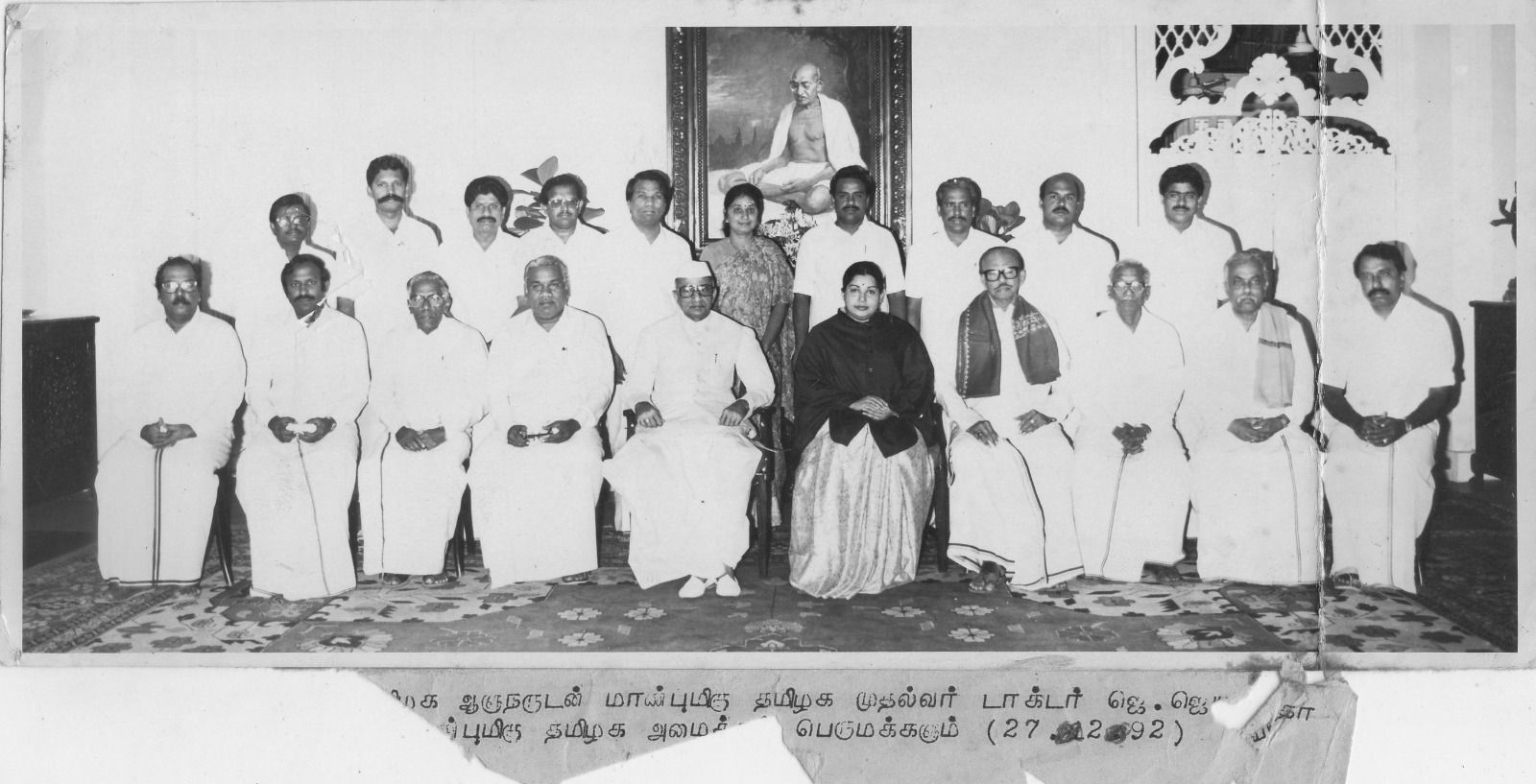
Jayalalithaa cabinet photography at Raj Bhavan on 27 December 1992
