= Subbulakshmi Jagadeesan =

Indian politician

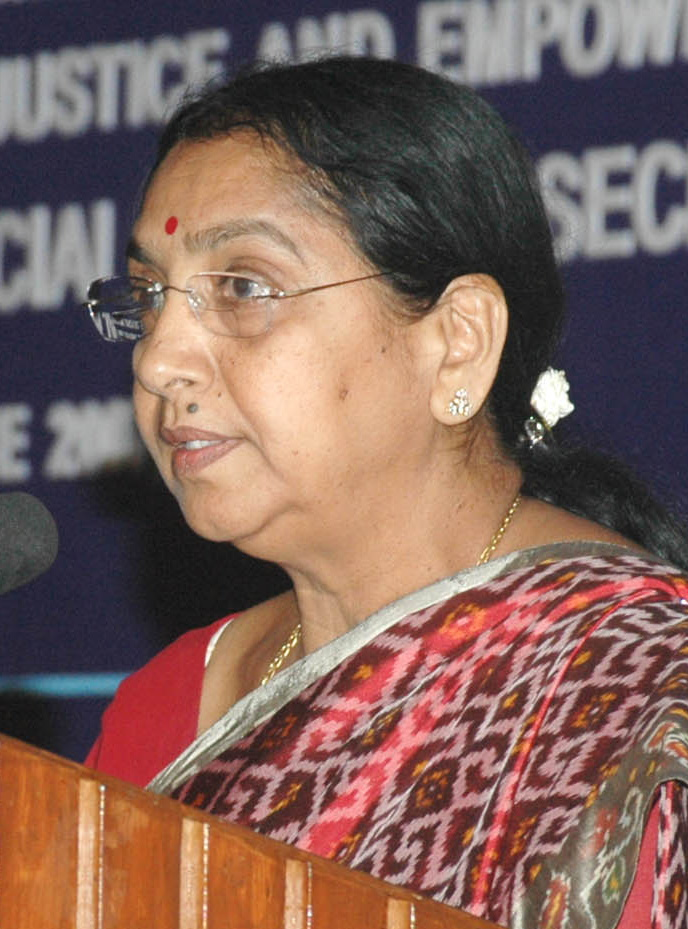

Union Minister of State in the Ministry of Social Justice and Empowerment
- In office 22 May 2004 – 23 May 2009
- Prime Minister: Manmohan Singh
- Preceded by: Nagmani
- Succeeded by: Napoleon

Minister of Social welfare (Govt of Tamil Nadu)
- In office 27 January 1989 – 30 January 1991
- Chief Minister: M. Karunanidhi

Minister of Textiles, Kaadhi, Handlooms and Small Scale Industries(Govt of Tamil Nadu)
- In office 30 June 1977 – 17 February 1980
- Chief Minister: M. G. Ramachandran

Member of Parliament, Lok Sabha
- In office 16 May 2004 – 16 May 2009
- Preceded by: M. Kannappan
- Constituency: Tiruchengode

Member of the Tamil Nadu Legislative Assembly
- In office 10 May 1996 – 14 May 2001
- Preceded by: Kavinilavu Dharmaraj
- Succeeded by: P. C. Ramasami
- Constituency: Modakurichi
- In office 6 February 1989 – 30 January 1991
- Preceded by: S. Muthusamy
- Succeeded by: C. Manickam
- Constituency: Erode
- In office 1977–1980
- Preceded by: M. Chinnasami
- Succeeded by: S. Balakrishnan
- Constituency: Modakurichi

Personal details
- Born: 24 June 1947 (age 79) Kodumudi, Erode district, Madras Presidency, British India
- Party: DMK
- Other political affiliations: AIADMK
- Spouse: A.B. Jegadeesan
- Relations: Gounder V.S. Chinnusamy (Father), C. Angaththal (Mother)
- Children: 1 son, Dr Jayaprakash Jegadeesan
- Education: Bsc., B.T., Educated at Sri Sankara Vidhya Sala, Kodumudi Seethalakshmi Ramasamy College, Tiruchy and Sri Saradha College, Salem
- As of 22 September, 2006

Subbulakshmi Jegadeesan Manoharan (born 24 June 1947) is an Indian politician. She was The Deputy general-secretary of the Dravida Munnetra Kazhagam and the Union Minister of State in the Ministry of Social Justice and Empowerment.

== Career ==
She was a member of the 14th Lok Sabha of India, representing the Tiruchengode constituency of Tamil Nadu as a member of the Dravida Munnetra Kazhagam (DMK) political party. She was previously elected to the Modakurichi constituency of the Tamil Nadu Legislative Assembly in 1977, 1996 elected to the Erode constituency of the Tamil Nadu Legislative Assembly in 1989.

She was minister in the ministry of Textile, kaadhi, handloom, small scale industries, Prohibition & excise of Tamil Nadu, 1977–1980.

She was minister in the ministry of Social welfare of Tamil Nadu, 1989–1991.

She was Minister of State in the Ministry of Social Justice and Empowerment of the Government of India.

She was the Deputy General Secretary, serving in the High level committee of the Dravida Munnetra Kazhagam

== Retirement ==
In a 29 August 2022 letter to M. K. Stalin, Subbulakshmi Jagadeesan tendered her resignation from all posts and the Dravida Munnetra Kazhagam party as she wishes to "retire from Politics."
