= Modakkurichi Assembly constituency =

State Legislative Assembly Constituency in Tamil Nadu

Coordinates: 11.24°N 77.78°E

Modakurichi
- Constituency No. 100 for the Tamil Nadu Legislative Assembly

Constituency details
- Country: India
- Region: South India
- State: Tamil Nadu
- District: Erode
- Lok Sabha constituency: Erode
- Established: 1951
- Total electors: 2,07,697

Member of Legislative Assembly
- 17th Tamil Nadu Legislative Assembly
- Incumbent D. Shanmugan
- Party: TVK
- Alliance: TVK+
- Elected year: 2026

Modakkurichi Assembly constituency (தமிழ்: மொடக்குறிச்சி) is a legislative assembly constituency in Erode district of Tamil Nadu. Its State Assembly Constituency number is 100. It is one of the 234 State Legislative Assembly Constituencies in Tamil Nadu, in India.

It covers Sivagiri, Modakkurichi and some parts of Erode City. It is included in Erode Lok Sabha constituency.

During the 1996 Assembly elections, a record 1033 candidates contested the Modakurichi Assembly seat. To check a repeat of this, the Election Commission increased the security deposit amount in the next elections.Due to this, Election to Modakurichi Cosntituency had been postponed for one month and by election was conducted. This Cosntituency elected women representatives for more times.

Elections and winners in the constituency are listed below.

== Members of Legislative Assembly ==
=== Madras State ===
Year	Winner	Party
1952	R. Kuppuswami and N. Mahalingam	Indian National Congress
1967	K. R. Nallasivam	Dravida Munnetra Kazhagam

=== Tamil Nadu ===
Year	Winner	Party
1971	M. Chinnasami	Dravida Munnetra Kazhagam
1977	Subbulakshmi Jegadeesan	All India Anna Dravida Munnetra Kazhagam
1980	S. Balakrishnan	All India Anna Dravida Munnetra Kazhagam
1984	S. Balakrishnan	All India Anna Dravida Munnetra Kazhagam
1989	Erode A. Ganeshamoorthy	Dravida Munnetra Kazhagam
1991	Kavinilavu Dharmaraj	All India Anna Dravida Munnetra Kazhagam
1996^	Subbulakshmi Jegadeesan	Dravida Munnetra Kazhagam
2001	P. C. Ramasami	All India Anna Dravida Munnetra Kazhagam
2006	R. M. Palanisami	Indian National Congress
2011	R. N. Kittusamy	All India Anna Dravida Munnetra Kazhagam
2016	V. P. Subramani	All India Anna Dravida Munnetra Kazhagam
2021	C. Saraswathi	Bharatiya Janata Party
2026	D. Shanmugan	Tamilaga Vettri Kazhagam

1996 - General Election was adjourned due to the contest of 1033 candidates. By election was held on 2nd June, 1996

== Election results ==
Vote share of winning candidates
2026	31.83%
2021	43.13%
2016	43.62%
2011	57.29%
2006	44.11%
2001	55.24%
1996	54.97%
1991	61.98%
1989	44.27%
1984	56.56%
1980	58.67%
1977	44.75%
1971	58.18%
1967	61.23%
1952	37.93%

=== 2026 ===
2026 Tamil Nadu Legislative Assembly election: Modakkurichi
Party	Candidate	Votes	%	±%
TVK	D. Shanmugan	60,715	31.83	New
BJP	S. Kirthika	58,285	30.55	▼12.58
DMK	S. Senthilnathan	58,236	30.53	▼12.44
NTK	M. Arunkumar	6,723	3.52	▼3.63
TVK	R. Karthikeyan	2,239	1.17	New
NOTA	NOTA	925	0.48	▼0.81
Independent	R. Velusamy	918	0.48	New
BSP	K. Muniyappan	651	0.34	▼0.29
Independent	L. Bharathi	585	0.31	New
Independent	A. Duraisamy	303	0.16	New
Independent	K. Dhanabal	284	0.15	New
Independent	A. Kathirvel	245	0.13	New
Independent	R. Natarajan	227	0.12	New
Ganasangam Party of India	M. Ravikumar	223	0.12	New
Namathu Kongu Munnetra Kalagam	M. Ramesh	200	0.10	New
Margin of victory		2,430	1.28	▲1.12
Turnout		1,90,759	91.84	▲16.01
Registered electors		2,07,697		▼31,202
TVK gain from BJP		Swing	▲31.83	

=== 2021 ===
2021 Tamil Nadu Legislative Assembly election: Modakurichi
Party	Candidate	Votes	%	±%
BJP	C. Saraswathi	78,125	43.13%	+40.83
DMK	Subbulakshmi Jagadeesan	77,844	42.97%	+0.61
NTK	G. Prakash	12,944	7.15%	+6.18
MNM	M. Rajeshkumar	4,574	2.52%	New
NOTA	NOTA	2,342	1.29%	−0.24
AMMK	D. Thangaraj	1,547	0.85%	New
BSP	R. Boopathi	1,143	0.63%	−0.06
Margin of victory		281	0.16%	−1.10%
Turnout		181,157	75.83%	−3.75%
Rejected ballots		589	0.33%	
Registered electors		238,899		
BJP gain from AIADMK		Swing	-0.49%	

=== 2016 ===
2016 Tamil Nadu Legislative Assembly election: Modakurichi
Party	Candidate	Votes	%	±%
AIADMK	V. P. Sivasubramani	77,067	43.62%	−13.67
DMK	P. Sachidanandam	74,845	42.36%	New
KMDK	S. Suriamoorthi	5,607	3.17%	New
DMDK	M. Ramesh	4,853	2.75%	New
BJP	J. Chinnamalai Krishnakumar	4,052	2.29%	−3.18
PMK	Nachimuthu	2,809	1.59%	New
NOTA	NOTA	2,715	1.54%	New
NTK	G. Prakash	1,713	0.97%	New
BSP	V. Parthiban	1,219	0.69%	−0.61
Margin of victory		2,222	1.26%	−24.98%
Turnout		176,676	79.58%	−1.92%
Registered electors		222,002		
AIADMK hold		Swing	-13.67%	

=== 2011 ===
2011 Tamil Nadu Legislative Assembly election: Modakurichi
Party	Candidate	Votes	%	±%
AIADMK	R. N. Kittusamy	87,705	57.29%	+15.81
INC	R. M. Palanisami	47,543	31.06%	−13.06
BJP	T. Kathirvel	8,376	5.47%	+3.22
BSP	K. Devendiran	1,992	1.30%	+0.67
Independent	K. S. Govanam Thangavel	1,555	1.02%	New
Independent	R. Veeragopal	1,314	0.86%	New
Independent	S. Ganesan	1,088	0.71%	New
Margin of victory		40,162	26.23%	23.60%
Turnout		187,832	81.50%	5.31%
Registered electors		153,092		
AIADMK gain from INC		Swing	13.18%	

=== 2006 ===
2006 Tamil Nadu Legislative Assembly election: Modakurichi
Party	Candidate	Votes	%	±%
INC	R. M. Palanisami	64,625	44.11%	New
AIADMK	V. P. Namachivayam	60,765	41.48%	−13.77
DMDK	B. Victoria	10,711	7.31%	New
BJP	P. Nallasamy	3,303	2.25%	New
Independent	K. S. Thangavel	1,076	0.73%	New
Independent	K. Selladurai	1,033	0.71%	New
BSP	S. Govindasamy	929	0.63%	−0.08
Margin of victory		3,860	2.63%	−22.80%
Turnout		146,507	76.20%	15.19%
Registered electors		192,274		
INC gain from AIADMK		Swing	-11.13%	

=== 2001 ===
2001 Tamil Nadu Legislative Assembly election: Modakurichi
Party	Candidate	Votes	%	±%
AIADMK	P. C. Ramasami	74,296	55.24%	+34
DMK	Subbulakshmi Jegadeesan	40,084	29.81%	−25.17
MDMK	P. M. Kulandaivelu	6,332	4.71%	−12.7
Independent	N. Vinayagamoorthy	2,292	1.70%	New
Independent	K. S. Thangavel	1,960	1.46%	New
Independent	P. Subramanian	1,910	1.42%	New
Independent	K. M. Balasubramaniam	1,898	1.41%	New
Independent	C. Thiyagarajan	1,344	1.00%	New
Tamil Desiyak Katchi	S. Suriamoorthy	1,242	0.92%	New
UCPI	T. K. Gunasekaran	1,086	0.81%	New
BSP	S. K. Chenniappan	954	0.71%	New
Margin of victory		34,212	25.44%	−8.29%
Turnout		134,487	61.01%	0.22%
Registered electors		220,433		
AIADMK gain from DMK		Swing	0.27%	

=== 1996 ===
1996 Tamil Nadu Legislative Assembly election: Modakurichi
Party	Candidate	Votes	%	±%
DMK	Subbulakshmi Jagadeesan	64,436	54.97%	+21.74
AIADMK	R. N. Kittusamy	24,896	21.24%	−40.74
MDMK	K. Elanchezhian	20,403	17.41%	New
Margin of victory		39,540	33.73%	4.99%
Turnout		117,215	60.79%	−8.33%
Registered electors		194,579		
DMK gain from AIADMK		Swing	-7.01%	

=== 1991 ===
1991 Tamil Nadu Legislative Assembly election: Modakurichi
Party	Candidate	Votes	%	±%
AIADMK	Kavinilavu Dharmaraj	78,653	61.98%	+29.92
DMK	K. Elanchezhian	42,178	33.24%	−11.03
BJP	A. Gandhi	3,450	2.72%	New
PMK	M. David	1,304	1.03%	New
Margin of victory		36,475	28.74%	16.54%
Turnout		126,904	69.12%	−8.30%
Registered electors		188,095		
AIADMK gain from DMK		Swing	17.71%	

=== 1989 ===
1989 Tamil Nadu Legislative Assembly election: Modakurichi
Party	Candidate	Votes	%	±%
DMK	A. Ganeshamurthi	58,058	44.27%	+2.64
AIADMK	S. Balakrishnan	42,051	32.06%	−24.5
AIADMK	Chinnusamy	16,811	12.82%	−43.74
INC	R. Sainathan	10,047	7.66%	New
Independent	K. Palanisamy	1,225	0.93%	New
Independent	A. Gandhi	884	0.67%	New
Margin of victory		16,007	12.20%	−2.72%
Turnout		131,154	77.42%	−0.33%
Registered electors		172,990		
DMK gain from AIADMK		Swing	-12.29%	

=== 1984 ===
1984 Tamil Nadu Legislative Assembly election: Modakurichi
Party	Candidate	Votes	%	±%
AIADMK	S. Balakrishnan	65,641	56.56%	−2.12
DMK	A. Ganeshamurthi	48,315	41.63%	+1.43
Independent	K. S. Shanmugham	1,069	0.92%	New
Independent	N. Ayyaswamy	737	0.64%	New
Margin of victory		17,326	14.93%	−3.55%
Turnout		116,060	77.75%	10.98%
Registered electors		154,501		
AIADMK hold		Swing	-2.12%	

=== 1980 ===
1980 Tamil Nadu Legislative Assembly election: Modakurichi
Party	Candidate	Votes	%	±%
AIADMK	S. Balakrishnan	56,049	58.67%	+13.93
DMK	A. Ganeshamurthi	38,402	40.20%	+22.34
Independent	M. S. Bharati	578	0.61%	New
Margin of victory		17,647	18.47%	−8.41%
Turnout		95,526	66.77%	2.39%
Registered electors		145,802		
AIADMK hold		Swing	13.93%	

=== 1977 ===
1977 Tamil Nadu Legislative Assembly election: Modakurichi
Party	Candidate	Votes	%	±%
AIADMK	Subbulakshmi Jagadeesan	38,072	44.75%	New
DMK	A. Ganeshamurthy	15,200	17.86%	−40.31
JP	M. Arumugam	12,955	15.23%	New
INC	R. Sainathan	11,462	13.47%	New
Independent	S. Shanmugasundaram	3,538	4.16%	New
Independent	M. Raman	2,284	2.68%	New
Independent	S. Rangasamy	516	0.61%	New
Independent	M. Murugesan	473	0.56%	New
Margin of victory		22,872	26.88%	9.24%
Turnout		85,083	64.38%	−8.90%
Registered electors		134,149		
AIADMK gain from DMK		Swing	-13.43%	

=== 1971 ===
1971 Tamil Nadu Legislative Assembly election: Modakurichi
Party	Candidate	Votes	%	±%
DMK	M. Chinnasami	45,108	58.18%	New
Socialist Party (India)	M. Chenniappan	31,431	40.54%	New
Independent	Rangasami	676	0.87%	New
Margin of victory		13,677	17.64%	−9.20%
Turnout		77,533	73.28%	−4.78%
Registered electors		109,028		
DMK gain from SSP		Swing	-3.05%	

=== 1967 ===
1967 Madras Legislative Assembly election: Modakurichi
Party	Candidate	Votes	%	±%
SSP	K. R. Nallasivam	45,303	61.23%	New
INC	C. Kulandiammal	25,444	34.39%	New
RPI	S. Gobu	3,245	4.39%	New
Margin of victory		19,859	26.84%	
Turnout		73,992	78.06%	
Registered electors		100,057		
SSP gain from INC		Swing		

=== 1952 ===
1952 Madras Legislative Assembly election: Modakurichi
Party	Candidate	Votes	%	±%
INC	R. Kuppuswami	18,835	37.93%	New
Socialist Party (India)	Chinandorai	14,062	28.32%	New
CPI	Raman	11,100	22.35%	New
Independent	Ayyasami Gounder	4,101	8.26%	New
Independent	Narasimha Ayyar	945	1.90%	New
Independent	Ramamoorthy	613	1.23%	New
Margin of victory		4,773	9.61%	
Turnout		49,656	65.07%	
Registered electors		76,307		
INC win (new seat)				
