= Valarmathi Jebaraj =

Indian politician

Cabinet Minister Government of Tamil Nadu
- In office 26 June 2001 – 24 November 2001
- Minister: Minister of Backward Class and Minority Welfare
- Chief Minister: J. Jayalalithaa; O. Panneerselvam
- Preceded by: A. Venkatachalam
- Succeeded by: C. Shanmugavelu

Valarmathi Jebaraj was an Indian politician and Member of the Legislative Assembly of Tamil Nadu. She was elected to the Tamil Nadu legislative assembly as a All India Anna Dravida Munnetra Kazhagam candidate from Madurai West constituency in 2001 election.
