= K. Pandurangan =

Indian politician

K. Pandurangan is an Indian politician and incumbent Member of the Legislative Assembly of Tamil Nadu. He was elected to the Tamil Nadu legislative assembly as an Anna Dravida Munnetra Kazhagam candidate from Anaicut constituency in 2001 and 2006 elections.
