= S. Balakrishnan (Modakurichi MLA) =

Indian politician

S. Balakrishnan is an Indian politician and former Member of the Legislative Assembly of Tamil Nadu. He was elected to the Tamil Nadu legislative assembly as an Anna Dravida Munnetra Kazhagam candidate from Modakurichi constituency in 1980, and 1984 elections.
