= Mulanur =

- Panchayat town
- Location in Tamil Nadu, India
- Coordinates: 10.77°N 77.72°E
- Country: India
- State: Tamil Nadu
- District: Tiruppur

Area
  - Total: 48.8 km^{2} (18.8 sq mi)

Population (2011)
  - Total: 15,223
  - Density: 312/km^{2} (808/sq mi)

Languages
  - Official: Tamil
- Time zone: UTC+5:30 (IST)

Mulanur is a panchayat town in Dharapuram taluk of Tiruppur district in the Indian state of Tamil Nadu. It is one of the 15 panchayat towns in the district. Spread across an area of 48.8 km^{2} (18.8 sq mi), it had a population of 15,223 individuals as per the 2011 census.

== Geography and administration ==
Mulanur is located in Dharapuram taluk of Tiruppur district in the Indian state of Tamil Nadu. Spread across an area of 48.8 km^{2} (18.8 sq mi), it is one of the 15 panchayat towns in the district. The town panchayat is divided into 15 wards, and consists of 42 hamlets and two revenue villages. The town panchayat is headed by a chairperson, who is elected by the members, who are chosen through direct elections. The town forms part of the Dharapuram Assembly constituency that elects its member to the Tamil Nadu legislative assembly and the Erode Lok Sabha constituency that elects its member to the Parliament of India.

== Demographics ==
As per the 2011 census, Mulanur had a population of 15,223 individuals across 4,617 households. The population saw a marginal increase compared to the previous census in 2001 when 13,827 inhabitants were registered. The population consisted of 7,544 males and 7,679 females. About 1,157 individuals were below the age of six years. About 20.4% of the population belonged to scheduled castes. The entire population is classified as urban. The town has an average literacy rate of 74.4%.

About 61% of the eligible population were employed full-time, of which majority were involved in agriculture and allied activities. Hinduism was the majority religion which was followed by 98.1% of the population, with Christianity (1.3%) and Islam (0.4%) being minor religions.
