= Modakurichi =

- Panchayat town
- Location in Tamil Nadu, India
- Coordinates: 11°13′59″N 77°46′41″E
- Country: India
- State: Tamil Nadu
- Region: Kongu Nadu
- District: Erode

Area
  - Total: 11.78 km^{2} (4.55 sq mi)

Population (2011)
  - Total: 9,907
  - Density: 841.0/km^{2} (2,178/sq mi)

Languages
  - Official: Tamil
- Time zone: UTC+5:30 (IST)
- PIN: 638104
- Telephone code: 91 (424)
- Vehicle registration: TN 33

Modakurichi is a panchayat town and taluk headquarters of Modakurichi taluk in Erode district in the Indian state of Tamil Nadu. It is located in the north-western part of the state. Spread across an area of 11.78 km^{2} (4.55 sq mi), it had a population of 9,907 individuals as per the 2011 census.

== Geography and administration ==
Modakurichi is located in Modakurichi taluk, Erode division of Erode district in the Indian state of Tamil Nadu. Spread across an area of 11.78 km^{2} (4.55 sq mi), it is one of the 42 panchayat towns in the district. It is located in the north-western part of the state.

The town panchayat is headed by a chairperson, who is elected by the members, who are chosen through direct elections. The town forms part of the Modakkurichi Assembly constituency that elects its member to the Tamil Nadu legislative assembly and the Erode Lok Sabha constituency that elects its member to the Parliament of India. In Modakurichi assembly constituency, 1033 candidates contested during the 1996 Tamil Nadu Legislative Assembly election setting a new record for the most candidates contesting in a seat in the Tamil Nadu assembly elections.

== Demographics ==
As per the 2011 census, Modakurichi had a population of 9,907 individuals across 3,076 households. The population saw a reduction compared to the previous census in 2001 when 10,052 inhabitants were registered. The population consisted of 4,931 males and 4,976 females. About 816 individuals were below the age of six years. The entire population is classified as urban. The town has an average literacy rate of 72.4%. About 19.1% of the population belonged to scheduled castes.

About 57.4% of the eligible population were employed, of which the highest proportion were engaged in agriculture and allied activities. Hinduism was the majority religion which was followed by 99.3% of the population, with Christianity (0.5%) and Islam (0.1%) being minor religions.

== Election results ==
=== 2026 ===
2026 Tamil Nadu Legislative Assembly election: Modakurichi
Party	Candidate	Votes	%	±%
SPA				
AIADMK+				
NTK	Arun			
TVK				New
NOTA	NOTA			
Margin of victory				
Turnout				
Rejected ballots				
Registered electors				
gain from		Swing		
