= By-elections to the 11th Tamil Nadu Assembly =

Indian State Assembly election

Tamil Nadu assembly by-election, 1996-2000
- 8 February 1997 and 22 February 1998, 5 and 11 September 1999 and 17 February 2000

8 vacant seats in the Legislature of Tamil Nadu
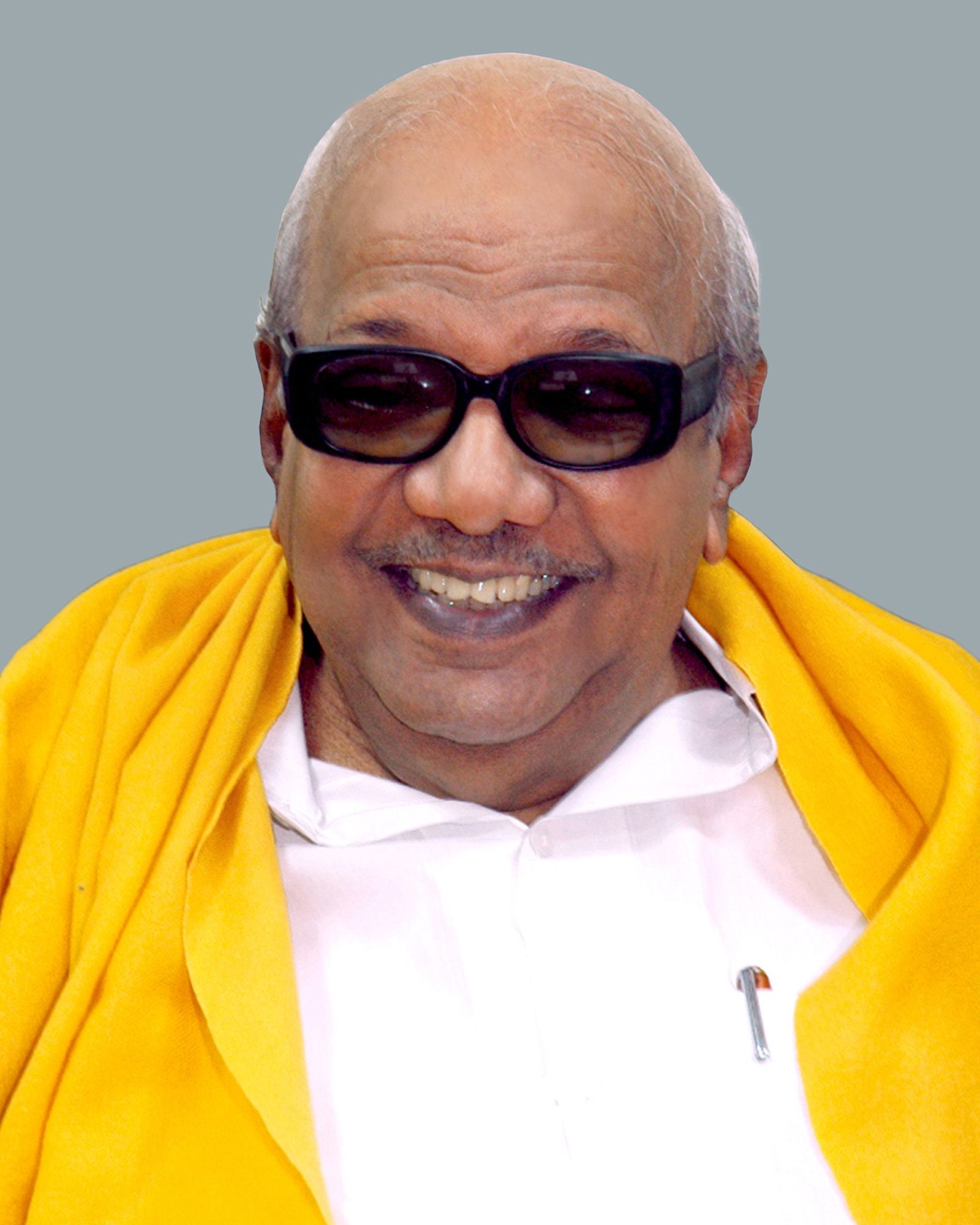

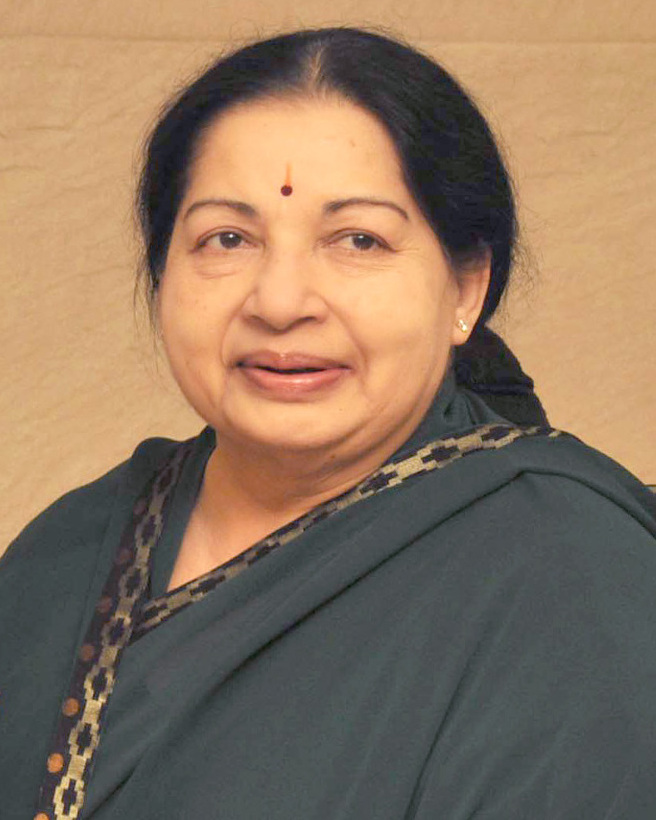
| Leader | M. Karunanidhi | J. Jayalalithaa |
| Party | DMK | AIADMK |
| Alliance | DMK Alliance | AIADMK alliance |
| Leader's seat | Chepauk | did not stand |
Incumbent Chief Minister
M. Karunanidhi
DMK

By-elections to Natham and Thiruvattar constituencies were held in Tamil Nadu, India, on 5 and 11 September 1999 respectively. Elections for three state assembly constituencies, Nellikuppam, Tiruchirappalli - II and Arantangi were held on 17 February 2000.

In the first phase, TMC lost a seat to AIADMK and Dravida Munnetra Kazhagam (DMK) lost a seat to Communist Party of India (Marxist) (CPI (M)). In the second phase, AIADMK splinter party MADMK, was able to pick up a seat from AIADMK and DMK was able to hold on to its seats.

== Results ==
| DMK+ | SEATS | ADMK+ | SEATS | TMC+ | SEATS | OTHERS | SEATS |
|---|---|---|---|---|---|---|---|
| DMK | 172 (-1) | AIADMK | 4 | TMC | 38 (-1) | CPI | 8 |
| BJP | 1 | PMK | 4 | | | CPM | 2 (+1) |
| MADMK | 1 (+1) | INC | 0 | | | FBL | 1 |
| MDMK | 0 | | | | | JD | 1 |
| | | | | | | JP | 1 |
| | | | | | | IND | 1 |
| TOTAL (2000) | 174 | TOTAL (2000) | 8 | TOTAL (2000) | 38 | TOTAL (2000) | 14 |
| TOTAL (1996) | 221 | TOTAL (1996) | 8 | TOTAL (1996) | n/a | TOTAL (1996) | 5 |

- The number on the left, in the table, represents the total number of MLAs after the by-election, and the number in parentheses represents the seats picked up or lost due to the by-election
- The numbers presented for 1996, represents, the alliance, when the TMC and the left allied with the DMK.

== Constituents and results ==
Source: Election Commission of India

=== Pudukottai ===
Tamil Nadu assembly by-election, 1997/98: Pudukottai
| Party | Candidate | Votes | % | ±% |
|---|---|---|---|---|
| DMK | P. Mari Ayya | 57,769 | 40.0% | |
| AIADMK | S. Chelladurai | 45,745 | 31.7% | |
| MDMK | V.N. Mani | 13,504 | 9.3% | |
| Independent | V.O.S. Panneerselvam | 12,892 | 8.9% | |
| markxist | P. Kumaravel | 5,133 | 3.6% | |
| Majority | | 12,024 | 8.3% | |
| Turnout | | 144,523 | 66.8% | |
| DMK hold | | Swing | | |

=== Coonoor ===
Tamil Nadu assembly by-election, 1997/98: Coonoor
| Party | Candidate | Votes | % | ±% |
|---|---|---|---|---|
| DMK | M. Ranganathan | 47,850 | 48.2% | |
| AIADMK | S. Karuppusamy | 37,945 | 38.2% | |
| INC | P. Arumugam | 7,189 | 7.2% | |
| ATMK | G. Guruswami Siddhan | 1,144 | 1.2% | |
| Majority | | 9,905 | 10.0% | |
| Turnout | | 99,348 | 58.5% | |
| DMK hold | | Swing | | |

=== Aruppukottai ===
Tamil Nadu assembly by-election, 1997/98: Aruppukottai
| Party | Candidate | Votes | % | ±% |
|---|---|---|---|---|
| DMK | Thangam Thenarasu | 40,223 | 36.5% | |
| AIADMK | V.S. Panchavarnam | 38,272 | 89.40 | |
| PT | P.T. Manickam | 12,484 | 11.3% | |
| Independent | K. Palaniswamy | 9,525 | 8.6% | |
| INC | K. Chandran | 1,329 | 1.2% | |
| Majority | | 1,951 | 1.8% | |
| Turnout | | 110,183 | 65.9% | |
| DMK hold | | Swing | | |

== See also ==
1. ECI By-election page

=== Natham ===
Tamil Nadu assembly by-election, 1999/2000: Natham
| Party | Candidate | Votes | % | ±% |
|---|---|---|---|---|
| AIADMK | R. Viswanathan | 38,764 | 34.2% | |
| MDMK | P. Chellam | 31,220 | 27.6% | |
| TMC(M) | M. Andi Ambalam | 28,465 | 25.1% | |
| Independent | S.R. Balasubramanian | 14,168 | 12.5% | |
| Majority | | 7,544 | 8.3% | |
| Turnout | | 113,233 | 62.0% | |
| AIADMK gain from TMC(M) | | Swing | | |

=== Thiruvattar ===
Source: Tamil Nadu Legislative Assembly

Tamil Nadu assembly by-election, 1999/2000: Thiruvattar
| Party | Candidate | Votes | % | ±% |
|---|---|---|---|---|
| CPI(M) | J. Hemachandran | | | |
| DMK | Dr. J. Pushpaleela | | | |
| TMC(M) | S. Philomin Dhas | | | |
| Independent | C. Stanley Babu Raj | | | |
| Majority | | | | |
| Turnout | | | | |
| CPI(M) gain from DMK | | Swing | | |

=== Nellikuppam ===
Tamil Nadu assembly by-election, 1999/2000: Nellikuppam
| Party | Candidate | Votes | % | ±% |
|---|---|---|---|---|
| DMK | V.C. Shanmugam | 62,256 | 56.1% | |
| AIADMK | M. Velayutham | 47,367 | 42.7% | |
| PT | Selvarasu | 900 | 0.8% | |
| Majority | | 14,889 | 13.4% | |
| Turnout | | 112,123 | 65.5% | |
| DMK hold | | Swing | | |

=== Tiruchirappalli - II ===
Tamil Nadu assembly by-election, 1999/2000: Tiruchirappalli - II
| Party | Candidate | Votes | % | ±% |
|---|---|---|---|---|
| DMK | Anbil Periyasamy | 60,990 | 57.9% | |
| AIADMK | T. Rathinavel | 41,330 | 39.2% | |
| PT | M. Ramesh | 1,283 | 1.22% | |
| Majority | | 19,660 | 18.7% | |
| Turnout | | 105,338 | 47.5% | |
| DMK hold | | Swing | | |

=== Arantangi ===
Tamil Nadu assembly by-election, 1999/2000: Arantangi
| Party | Candidate | Votes | % | ±% |
|---|---|---|---|---|
| MADMK | C. Anbarasan | 71,491 | 53.8% | |
| AIADMK | Raja Paramasivam | 44,733 | 33.7% | |
| PT | M. Jesuraj | 8,211 | 6.2% | |
| Majority | | 26,758 | 20.2% | |
| Turnout | | 134,066 | 50.7% | |
| MADMK gain from AIADMK | | Swing | | |

== See also ==
1. ECI By-election page
