= A. S. Ponnammal =

Indian politician

- ஏ. எஸ். பொன்னம்மாள்

Member of the Tamil Nadu Legislative Assembly
- In office 1957–1962
- Preceded by: Muthu and Ayyanar
- Succeeded by: Abdul Aziz
- Constituency: Nilakottai
- In office 1980–1984
- Preceded by: A. Baluchamy
- Succeeded by: A. Baluchamy
- Constituency: Nilakottai
- In office 1989–2001
- Preceded by: A. Baluchamy
- Succeeded by: G. Anbazhagan
- Constituency: Nilakottai
- In office 1962–1967
- Preceded by: Constituency established
- Succeeded by: P. S. Maniyan
- Constituency: Sholavandan
- In office 1984–1989
- Preceded by: N. Palanivel
- Succeeded by: N. Palanivel
- Constituency: Palani

Personal details
- Born: 1927 Alagampatti, Nilakottai, Madura District (now Dindigul District), Madras Presidency, British Raj (now Tamilnadu, India)
- Died: 25 November 2015 (aged 87–88) Government Rajaji Hospital, Madurai
- Party: Indian National Congress (1946-1996); Tamil Maanila Congress (1996-2001); Congress Jananayaka Peravai
- Occupation: Politician

A. S. Ponnammal was an Indian Politician and a seven time MLA to the Tamil Nadu Legislative Assembly spanning from 1957 to 2001. She was part of Congress Party, Tamil Maanila Congress and Congress Jananayaka Peravai. She was elected to the Tamil Nadu Legislative Assembly for five terms representing Nilakottai Assembly constituency and one term from each from the Palani Assembly constituency and Sholavandan Assembly constituency respectively. She was commonly referred to as Akka (elder sister). She died at Madurai at an age of 88 in 2015.

== Career ==
Ponnammal represented the Congress Party in the Tamil Nadu legislative assembly from 1957 to 1967, having been elected from the Sholavandan constituency in Madurai. She was subsequently elected to Tamil Nadu assembly in 1980 as an independent candidate. In 1984, she was elected in the Palani constituency as an Indian National Congress candidate. She won the Nilakottai constituency in 1989 and 1991 as an Indian National Congress candidate and in 1996 as a Tamil Maanila Congress (Moopanar) Ponnammal was a veteran M.L.A of Tamil Nadu. She served as the Pro-term speaker of Tamil Nadu Legislative assembly post the state elections in 1989, 1991 and 1996. She unsuccessfully contested the Nilakottai seat in 1967, 1971 and 2001 elections.

== Elections contested ==
=== Tamil Nadu Legislative elections ===
Year	Constituency	Party	Votes	%	Opponent	Party	Votes	%	Result	Margin	%
1957	Nilakottai	INC	29,623	19.24	M. Vadivel	IND	14,965	9.72	Won	+14,658	+9.52
1962	Sholavandan	INC	25,911	46.37	A. Muniyandi	DMK	18,445	33.01	Won	+7,466	+13.36
1967	Nilakottai	INC	25,115	38.55	A. Muniyandi	DMK	37,601	57.71	Lost	-12,486	-19.16
1971	Nilakottai	INC	24,540	38.88	A. Muniyandi	DMK	38,583	61.12	Lost	-14,043	-22.24
1980	Nilakottai	IND	48,892	61.60	A. Manivasagam	DMK	30,480	38.40	Won	+18,412	+23.20
1984	Palani	INC	62,344	66.27	N. Palanivel	CPM	30,794	32.73	Won	+31,550	+33.54
1989	Nilakottai	INC	29,654	30.10	R. Paranthaman	DMK	28,962	29.39	Won	+692	+0.71
1991	Nilakottai	INC	62,110	65.75	M. Arivazhagan	DMK	25,050	26.52	Won	+37,060	+39.23
1996	Nilakottai	TMC	59,541	54.48	A. Rasu	INC	27,538	25.20	Won	+32,003	+29.28
2001	Nilakottai	IND	7,533	7.09	G. Anbazhagan	ADMK	60,972	57.36	Lost	-53,439	-50.27

== Awards ==
She was awarded with the Kamarajar award of the Government of Tamil Nadu in 2006 to recognise and honour her public service.

== Death ==
She died in 2015 at Government Rajaji Hospital, Madurai.
