= S. Thenmozhi =

Indian politician

Member of the Tamil Nadu Legislative Assembly
- In office 23 May 2019 – 5 May 2026
- Preceded by: R. Thangathurai
- Succeeded by: R. Ayyanar
- Constituency: Nilakkotai
- In office 11 May 2006 – 16 May 2011
- Preceded by: G. Anbazhagan
- Succeeded by: A. Ramasamy
- Constituency: Nilakkotai

Personal details
- Party: All India Anna Dravida Munnetra Kazhagam

S. Thenmozhi is an Indian politician and is Member of the Legislative Assembly of Tamil Nadu. She was elected to the Tamil Nadu legislative assembly as an All India Anna Dravida Munnetra Kazhagam candidate from Nilakottai constituency in the by-election in 2019.
