= M. V. Karuppaiah =

Indian politician

Pro-Term Speaker of Tamil Nadu Legislative Assembly
- In office 10 May 2026 – 12 May 2026
- Constituency: Sholavandan

Member of Tamil Nadu Legislative Assembly
- Incumbent
- Assumed office 4 May 2026
- Preceded by: A. Venkatesan
- Constituency: Sholavandan
- In office 23 May 2011 – 21 May 2016
- Preceded by: P. Moorthy
- Succeeded by: K. Manickam
- Constituency: Sholavandan

Personal details
- Party: Tamilaga Vettri Kazhagam
- Other political affiliations: All India Anna Dravida Munnetra Kazhagam

M. V. Karuppaiah is an Indian politician from Tamil Nadu. He is a member of the Tamil Nadu Legislative Assembly from the Sholavandan representing the Tamilaga Vettri Kazhagam.

Previously he represented same constituency as All India Anna Dravida Munnetra Kazhagam candidate.

He shifted to Tamilaga Vettri Kazhagam and is nominated to contest from Sholavandan Assembly constituency which is reserved for Scheduled Caste community in Madurai district, in the 2026 Tamil Nadu Legislative Assembly election.. He has been elected as the Pro-tem Speaker for the Tami Nadu Legislative Assembly.
