= K. Ravimanoharan =

Indian politician

Member of the Tamil Nadu Legislative Assembly
- Incumbent
- Assumed office 11 May 2026
- Preceded by: I. P. Senthil Kumar
- Constituency: Palani

Personal details
- Party: All India Anna Dravida Munnetra Kazhagam
- Parent: Kuppuchamy (father)
- Occupation: Politician, Agriculture, Business

K. Ravimanoharan is an Indian politician who is a Member of the 17th Legislative Assembly of Tamil Nadu. He was elected from Palani as an AIADMK candidate in 2026.

== Elections contested ==
2026 Tamil Nadu Legislative Assembly election: Palani
Party	Candidate	Votes	%	±%
AIADMK	K. Ravimanoharan	66,986	32.11	▼6.12
TVK	M. Praveen Kumar	66,293	31.78	New
CPI(M)	N. Pandi	65,534	31.41	New
NTK	B. Murugeswari	6,300	3.02	▼0.71
NOTA	NOTA	750	0.36	▼0.18
Margin of victory		693	0.33	▼14.30
Turnout		2,08,619	86.97	▲12.88
Registered electors		2,39,881		▼37,333
AIADMK gain from DMK		Swing	▼6.12	
