= Sholavandan Assembly constituency =

One of the 234 State Legislative Assembly Constituencies in Tamil Nadu, in India

Coordinates: 10.02°N 77.96°E

Sholavandan
- Constituency No. 190 for the Tamil Nadu Legislative Assembly

Constituency details
- Country: India
- Region: South India
- State: Tamil Nadu
- District: Madurai
- Lok Sabha constituency: Theni
- Established: 1962
- Total electors: 2,15,348
- Reservation: SC

Member of Legislative Assembly
- 17th Tamil Nadu Legislative Assembly
- Incumbent M. V. Karuppaiah
- Party: TVK
- Elected year: 2026

Sholavandan is a state assembly constituency in Madurai district in Tamil Nadu. Sholavandan Assembly constituency is a part of Theni Lok Sabha constituency. It is one of the 234 State Legislative Assembly Constituencies in Tamil Nadu in India.

Elections and winners from this constituency are listed below.

== Members of Legislative Assembly ==
Year	Member	Political party
Madras State
1962	A. S. Ponnammal	Indian National Congress
1967	P. S. Maniyan	Dravida Munnetra Kazhagam
Tamil Nadu
1971	P. S. Maniyan	Dravida Munnetra Kazhagam
1977	V. Balaguru	All India Anna Dravida Munnetra Kazhagam
1980	A. Chandrasekaran	Indian National Congress (I)
1984	A. Chandrasekaran	Indian National Congress
1989	D. Radhakrishnan	Dravida Munnetra Kazhagam
1991	A. M. Paramasivan	All India Anna Dravida Munnetra Kazhagam
1996	L. Santhanam	Dravida Munnetra Kazhagam
2001	V. R. Rajangam	All India Anna Dravida Munnetra Kazhagam
2006	P. Moorthy	Dravida Munnetra Kazhagam
2011	M. V. Karuppiah	All India Anna Dravida Munnetra Kazhagam
2016	K. Manickam	All India Anna Dravida Munnetra Kazhagam
2021	A. Venkatesan	Dravida Munnetra Kazhagam
2026	M. V. Karuppaiah	Tamilaga Vettri Kazhagam

== Election results ==
Vote share of winning candidates
2026	33.80%
2021	48.04%
2016	52.33%
2011	59.84%
2006	42.39%
2001	51.59%
1996	49.29%
1991	67.34%
1989	34.24%
1984	53.35%
1980	50.28%
1977	40.02%
1971	55.23%
1967	60.19%
1962	46.37%

=== 2026 ===
2026 Tamil Nadu Legislative Assembly election: Sholavandan
Party	Candidate	Votes	%	±%
TVK	Karuppaiah M. V.	63,907	33.80	New
DMK	A. Venkatesan	61,229	32.38	▼15.66
AIADMK	K. Manickam	49,494	26.18	▼12.14
All India Puratchi Thalaivar Makkal Munnetra Kazhagam	Balamurugan K.	2,091	1.11	New
NOTA	NOTA	571	0.30	▼0.25
PT	Raghu K.	265	0.14	New
Independent	Balamurugan R.	203	0.11	New
TVK	Thangapandi P.	195	0.10	New
Independent	Ranjith Kumar S.	187	0.10	New
Independent	Gunasekaran P.	186	0.10	New
Independent	Balamurugan C.	143	0.08	New
Independent	Ajay Subash B.	72	0.04	New
India Dravida Makkal Katchi	Ramadoss C.	65	0.03	New
Independent	Krishnasamy P.	42	0.02	New
Margin of victory		2,678	1.42	▼8.30
Turnout		1,89,080	87.80	▲6.65
Registered electors		2,15,348		▼0.35%
TVK gain from DMK		Swing	▲33.80	

=== 2021 ===
2021 Tamil Nadu Legislative Assembly election: Sholavandan
Party	Candidate	Votes	%	±%
DMK	A. Venkatesan	84,240	48.04%	+10.65
AIADMK	K. Manickam	67,195	38.32%	−14.02
DMDK	M. Jeyalakshmi	3,582	2.04%	New
MNM	S. Yoganathan	3,031	1.73%	New
NOTA	NOTA	961	0.55%	−0.61
Margin of victory		17,045	9.72%	−5.22%
Turnout		175,361	81.15%	0.60%
Rejected ballots		55	0.03%	
Registered electors		216,106		
DMK gain from AIADMK		Swing	-4.30%	

=== 2016 ===
2016 Tamil Nadu Legislative Assembly election: Sholavandan
Party	Candidate	Votes	%	±%
AIADMK	K. Manickam	87,044	52.33%	−7.5
DMK	C. Bhavani	62,187	37.39%	New
VCK	R. Pandiyammal	7,357	4.42%	New
BJP	S. Palanivel Swamy	2,766	1.66%	+0.28
NOTA	NOTA	1,930	1.16%	New
PMK	S. Muthaiah	857	0.52%	−33.96
Margin of victory		24,857	14.94%	−10.42%
Turnout		166,324	80.55%	−2.11%
Registered electors		206,488		
AIADMK hold		Swing	-7.50%	

=== 2011 ===
2011 Tamil Nadu Legislative Assembly election: Sholavandan
Party	Candidate	Votes	%	±%
AIADMK	M. V. Karuppiah	86,376	59.84%	+18.86
PMK	M. Ilanseliyan	49,768	34.48%	New
BJP	S. Palanivelswamy	2,002	1.39%	−0.29
Independent	A. Veeran	1,998	1.38%	New
Independent	M. Vazhipiranthal	975	0.68%	New
BSP	A. Aanantha Kumar	806	0.56%	New
Margin of victory		36,608	25.36%	23.95%
Turnout		144,348	82.66%	11.34%
Registered electors		174,634		
AIADMK gain from DMK		Swing	17.45%	

=== 2006 ===
2006 Tamil Nadu Legislative Assembly election: Sholavandan
Party	Candidate	Votes	%	±%
DMK	P. Moorthy	47,771	42.39%	+9.62
AIADMK	L. Santhanam	46,185	40.98%	−10.61
DMDK	P. Rajendran	13,942	12.37%	New
BJP	Pon. Karunanidhi	1,891	1.68%	New
AIFB	P. N. Ammavasi	722	0.64%	New
Independent	P. Moorthy	637	0.57%	New
Independent	K. Karadi	614	0.54%	New
Margin of victory		1,586	1.41%	−17.41%
Turnout		112,702	71.32%	3.67%
Registered electors		158,021		
DMK gain from AIADMK		Swing	-9.20%	

=== 2001 ===
2001 Tamil Nadu Legislative Assembly election: Sholavandan
Party	Candidate	Votes	%	±%
AIADMK	V. R. Rajangam	54,392	51.59%	+20.07
DMK	P. Moorthy	34,551	32.77%	−16.52
JD(S)	K. Duraisamy	5,110	4.85%	New
JP	S. Manoharan	3,967	3.76%	New
MDMK	R. Bitchal	3,075	2.92%	−9.93
Independent	A. Chandrasekaran	2,146	2.04%	New
ATMK	I. C. Natarajan	737	0.70%	New
Margin of victory		19,841	18.82%	1.04%
Turnout		105,430	67.65%	−3.32%
Registered electors		155,871		
AIADMK gain from DMK		Swing	2.30%	

=== 1996 ===
1996 Tamil Nadu Legislative Assembly election: Sholavandan
Party	Candidate	Votes	%	±%
DMK	L. Santhanam	52,151	49.29%	+17.93
AIADMK	A. M. Paramasivan	33,343	31.52%	−35.82
MDMK	P. S. Manian	13,588	12.84%	New
JP	V. Sundaram	2,535	2.40%	New
Independent	M. M. Muthunayagam	1,799	1.70%	New
Independent	C. Thirupathi	650	0.61%	New
Margin of victory		18,808	17.78%	−18.20%
Turnout		105,796	70.96%	3.35%
Registered electors		156,506		
DMK gain from AIADMK		Swing	-18.04%	

=== 1991 ===
1991 Tamil Nadu Legislative Assembly election: Sholavandan
Party	Candidate	Votes	%	±%
AIADMK	A. M. Paramasivan	66,100	67.34%	+38.44
DMK	A. M. M. Ambikapathy	30,787	31.36%	−2.87
Margin of victory		35,313	35.97%	30.64%
Turnout		98,163	67.62%	−8.00%
Registered electors		149,340		
AIADMK gain from DMK		Swing	33.10%	

=== 1989 ===
1989 Tamil Nadu Legislative Assembly election: Sholavandan
Party	Candidate	Votes	%	±%
DMK	D. Radhakrishnan	33,726	34.24%	New
AIADMK	P. S. Manian	28,467	28.90%	New
INC	A. Chandrasekaran	18,607	18.89%	−34.47
Independent	C. Jayachandran	15,679	15.92%	New
Independent	T. Malaichamy	949	0.96%	New
Margin of victory		5,259	5.34%	−15.99%
Turnout		98,512	75.62%	1.84%
Registered electors		132,766		
DMK gain from INC		Swing	-19.12%	

=== 1984 ===
1984 Tamil Nadu Legislative Assembly election: Sholavandan
Party	Candidate	Votes	%	±%
INC	A. Chandrasekaran	44,464	53.35%	+3.07
JP	S. P. Rajangam	26,692	32.03%	New
Independent	K. Chellapandi	10,163	12.20%	New
Independent	D. Valliammal	690	0.83%	New
Independent	S. Sundaramahalingam	526	0.63%	New
Independent	N. V. Palanichamy Reddiar	497	0.60%	New
Margin of victory		17,772	21.33%	20.77%
Turnout		83,337	73.78%	0.38%
Registered electors		120,399		
INC hold		Swing	3.07%	

=== 1980 ===
1980 Tamil Nadu Legislative Assembly election: Sholavandan
Party	Candidate	Votes	%	±%
INC	A. Chandrasekaran	41,720	50.28%	+18.96
AIADMK	P. S. Maniyan	41,255	49.72%	+9.7
Margin of victory		465	0.56%	−8.14%
Turnout		82,975	73.40%	2.81%
Registered electors		114,795		
INC gain from AIADMK		Swing	10.26%	

=== 1977 ===
1977 Tamil Nadu Legislative Assembly election: Sholavandan
Party	Candidate	Votes	%	±%
AIADMK	V. Balaguru	29,968	40.02%	New
INC	A. Chandrasekaran	23,455	31.32%	−12.78
DMK	C. Duraipandi	17,781	23.75%	−31.49
JP	Edakanathan	2,772	3.70%	New
Independent	S. Sundaramahalingam	903	1.21%	New
Margin of victory		6,513	8.70%	−2.43%
Turnout		74,879	70.60%	−6.45%
Registered electors		107,271		
AIADMK gain from DMK		Swing	-15.21%	

=== 1971 ===
1971 Tamil Nadu Legislative Assembly election: Sholavandan
Party	Candidate	Votes	%	±%
DMK	P. S. Maniyan	43,254	55.23%	−4.96
INC	R. Sundarajan Servai	34,542	44.11%	+5.87
Independent	Thnv Sundaramahalingam	516	0.66%	New
Margin of victory		8,712	11.12%	−10.83%
Turnout		78,312	77.05%	−4.75%
Registered electors		107,175		
DMK hold		Swing	-4.96%	

=== 1967 ===
1967 Madras Legislative Assembly election: Sholavandan
Party	Candidate	Votes	%	±%
DMK	P. S. Maniyan	45,221	60.19%	+27.19
INC	R. S. Servai	28,728	38.24%	−8.13
Independent	M. Chidambaram	1,178	1.57%	New
Margin of victory		16,493	21.95%	8.59%
Turnout		75,127	81.80%	7.02%
Registered electors		94,581		
DMK gain from INC		Swing	13.83%	

=== 1962 ===
1962 Madras Legislative Assembly election: Sholavandan
Party	Candidate	Votes	%	±%
INC	A. S. Ponnammal	25,911	46.37%	New
DMK	A. Muniandi	18,445	33.01%	New
CPI	C. Nilamegam	6,473	11.58%	New
SWA	I. Sonaimuthu	2,942	5.26%	New
Independent	S. Kanniappan	1,342	2.40%	New
Tamilnad Socialist Labour Party	K. Subbiah Alias Alagumalai	770	1.38%	New
Margin of victory		7,466	13.36%	
Turnout		55,883	74.78%	
Registered electors		78,247		
INC win (new seat)				
