= V. R. Rajangam =

Indian politician

Member of the Tamil Nadu Legislative Assembly
- In office 2001–2006
- Preceded by: L. Santhanam
- Succeeded by: P. Moorthy
- Constituency: Sholavandan

Personal details
- Born: 12 October 1955 (age 70) Pudukkottai, Tamil Nadu, India
- Party: All India Anna Dravida Munnetra Kazhagam
- Occupation: Agriculture, Business

V. R. Rajangam is an Indian politician and a former member of the Tamil Nadu Legislative Assembly. He hails from the Chinna Chokkikulam area in the Madurai district. A postgraduate degree holder, Rajangam is a member of the All India Anna Dravida Munnetra Kazhagam (AIADMK) party. He was elected to the Tamil Nadu Legislative Assembly from the Sholavandan Assembly constituency in the 2001 state assembly elections.

== Electoral Performance ==
=== 2001 ===
2001 Tamil Nadu Legislative Assembly election: Sholavandan
Party	Candidate	Votes	%	±%
AIADMK	V. R. Rajangam	54,392	51.59%	+20.07
DMK	P. Moorthy	34,551	32.77%	−16.52
JD(S)	K. Duraisamy	5,110	4.85%	New
JP	S. Manoharan	3,967	3.76%	New
MDMK	R. Bitchal	3,075	2.92%	−9.93
Independent	A. Chandrasekaran	2,146	2.04%	New
ATMK	I. C. Natarajan	737	0.70%	New
Margin of victory		19,841	18.82%	1.04%
Turnout		105,430	67.65%	−3.32%
Registered electors		155,871		
AIADMK gain from DMK		Swing	2.30%	
