= Chandrasekaran =

Chandrasekaran is a surname. Notable people with the surname include:

- A. Chandrasekaran, Indian politician and former Member of the Legislative Assembly of Tamil Nadu
- Chidambara Chandrasekaran (1911–2000), Indian demographer and statistician
- Durai Chandrasekaran, Indian politician and incumbent Member of the Legislative Assembly of Tamil Nadu
- K. B. V. Sc. Chandrasekaran, Indian politician and incumbent Member of the Legislative Assembly of Tamil Nadu
- K N Chandrasekaran Pillai (1943–2025), Indian legal academic
- M. Chandrasekaran (born 1937), Carnatic classical violinist from Chennai (formerly Madras), Tamil Nadu
- Natarajan Chandrasekaran (born 1963), Indian business executive, Chairman of Tata Sons
- Periyasamy Chandrasekaran (1957–2010), Sri Lankan politician
- Rajiv Chandrasekaran, Indian-American journalist
- S. Chandrasekaran (born 1959), contemporary modern artist

== See also ==
- Chandrasekhar (disambiguation)
- Chandrasekharania
