= Nilakottai Assembly constituency =

One of the 234 State Legislative Assembly Constituencies in Tamil Nadu, in India

Coordinates: 10.17°N 77.87°E

Nilakottai
- Constituency No. 130 for the Tamil Nadu Legislative Assembly

Constituency details
- Country: India
- Region: South India
- State: Tamil Nadu
- District: Dindigul
- Lok Sabha constituency: Dindigul
- Established: 1951
- Total electors: 2,21,565
- Reservation: SC

Member of Legislative Assembly
- 17th Tamil Nadu Legislative Assembly
- Incumbent Ayyanar.R
- Party: TVK
- Elected year: 2026

Nilakottai or Nilakkottai is a state assembly constituency in Dindigul district in Tamil Nadu. Its State Assembly Constituency number is 130. It comes under Dindigul Lok Sabha constituency. It is reserved for members of the Scheduled Castes. It is one of the 234 State Legislative Assembly Constituencies in Tamil Nadu, in India. Elections and winners from this constituency are listed below.

== Members of Legislative Assembly ==
=== Madras State ===
Year	Winner	Party
1952	Ayyanar and Muthu Thevar	Indian National Congress
1957	W. P. A. R. Chandrasekaran and A. S. Ponnammal	Indian National Congress
1962	Abdul Aziz	Indian National Congress
1967	A. Muniyandi	Dravida Munnetra Kazhagam

=== Tamil Nadu ===
Year	Winner	Party
1971	A. Muniyandi	Dravida Munnetra Kazhagam
1977	A. Baluchamy	All India Anna Dravida Munnetra Kazhagam
1980	A. S. Ponnammal	Independent
1984	A. Baluchamy	All India Anna Dravida Munnetra Kazhagam
1989	A. S. Ponnammal	Indian National Congress
1991	A. S. Ponnammal	Indian National Congress
1996	A. S. Ponnammal	Tamil Maanila Congress
2001	G. Anbazhagan	All India Anna Dravida Munnetra Kazhagam
2006	S. Thenmozhi	All India Anna Dravida Munnetra Kazhagam
2011	A. Ramasamy	Puthiya Tamilagam
2016	R. Thangathurai	All India Anna Dravida Munnetra Kazhagam
2019^	S. Thenmozhi	All India Anna Dravida Munnetra Kazhagam
2021	S. Thenmozhi	All India Anna Dravida Munnetra Kazhagam
2026	Ayyanar.R	Tamilaga Vettri Kazhagam

== Election results ==
Vote share of winning candidates
2026	34.71%
2021	49.49%
2019 by-election	49.78%
2016	48.99%
2011	52.45%
2006	43.37%
2001	57.36%
1996	54.48%
1991	65.75%
1989	30.10%
1984	62.88%
1980	61.60%
1977	51.19%
1971	61.12%
1967	57.71%
1962	31.75%
1957	28.01%
1952	26.28%

=== 2026 ===
2026 Tamil Nadu Legislative Assembly election: Nilakottai
Party	Candidate	Votes	%	±%
TVK	Ayyanar.R	68,580	34.71	New
DMK	Nagajothi.S	65,655	33.23	▼1.32
AIADMK	Thenmozhi.S	49,924	25.27	▼24.22
NTK	Dr.Kailai Rajan.D	8,615	4.36	▼5.11
RPI(A)	Selvam.P B.A. B.L.	763	0.39	New
NOTA	NOTA	642	0.32	▼0.36
Independent	Manikandan.P	515	0.26	New
BSP	Rajalakshmi.M	505	0.26	New
PT	Sankar.P	441	0.22	New
Independent	Vijayapandiyan.M	415	0.21	New
All India Puratchi Thalaivar Makkal Munnetra Kazhagam	Anbalagan.G	399	0.20	New
Independent	Manoharan.M	349	0.18	New
Independent	Alappan.A	331	0.17	New
Independent	Perumal.N	238	0.12	New
Independent	Chellam.K	162	0.08	New
Independent	Karuppaiah.S	59	0.03	New
Margin of victory		2,925	1.48	▼13.46
Turnout		1,97,593	89.18	▲13.45
Registered electors		2,21,565		▼22,479
TVK gain from AIADMK		Swing	▲34.71	

=== 2021 ===
2021 Tamil Nadu Legislative Assembly election: Nilakottai
Party	Candidate	Votes	%	±%
AIADMK	S. Thenmozhi	91,461	49.49%	+0.5
MVK	K. Murugavelrajan	63,843	34.55%	−5.98
NTK	G. Vasanthadevi	17,509	9.47%	+8.78
DMDK	K. Ramasamy	3,704	2.00%	−2.39
MNM	Ananth	3,181	1.72%	New
NOTA	NOTA	1,260	0.68%	−0.36
Margin of victory		27,618	14.94%	6.48%
Turnout		184,805	75.73%	−4.13%
Rejected ballots		398	0.22%	
Registered electors		244,044		
AIADMK hold		Swing	0.50%	

=== 2019 by-election ===
2019 Tamil Nadu Legislative Assembly by-elections: Nilakottai
Party	Candidate	Votes	%	±%
AIADMK	S. Thenmozhi	90,982	49.78	
DMK	C. Soundarapandian	70,307		
AMMK	R. Thangathurai	9,401		New
NTK	A. Sanigilipandian	4,934		New
MNM	C. Chinnadurai	3,139		New
NOTA	None of the Above	1,339		New
Majority		20,675		
Turnout		1,82,750	80.29	
Registered electors		2,29,209		
AIADMK hold		Swing		

=== 2016 ===
2016 Tamil Nadu Legislative Assembly election: Nilakottai
Party	Candidate	Votes	%	±%
AIADMK	R. Thangathurai	85,507	48.99%	New
DMK	M. Anbazhagan	70,731	40.52%	New
DMDK	K. Ramasamy	7,666	4.39%	New
BJP	R. Alagumani	2,565	1.47%	−1.29
PMK	N. Ramoorthy	2,201	1.26%	New
NOTA	NOTA	1,819	1.04%	New
NTK	A. Sangilipandian	1,204	0.69%	New
Margin of victory		14,776	8.47%	−8.79%
Turnout		174,541	79.85%	0.98%
Registered electors		218,582		
AIADMK gain from PT		Swing	-3.46%	

=== 2011 ===
2011 Tamil Nadu Legislative Assembly election: Nilakottai
Party	Candidate	Votes	%	±%
PT	A. Ramasamy	75,124	52.45%	New
INC	K. Rajangam	50,410	35.19%	−3.06
TMMK	B. John Pandian	6,882	4.80%	New
BJP	Chinnappan @ V. Rajendran	3,952	2.76%	+1.6
LJP	S. Selvaraj	2,440	1.70%	New
Independent	S. Sivakumar	1,869	1.30%	New
IJK	T. Sivabalan	1,669	1.17%	New
BSP	P. Pitchaiammal	897	0.63%	−0.44
Margin of victory		24,714	17.25%	12.14%
Turnout		181,623	78.87%	9.27%
Registered electors		143,243		
PT gain from AIADMK		Swing	9.08%	

=== 2006 ===
2006 Tamil Nadu Legislative Assembly election: Nilakottai
Party	Candidate	Votes	%	±%
AIADMK	S. Thenmozhi	53,275	43.37%	−13.99
INC	K. Senthilvel	46,991	38.25%	New
DMDK	M. Ravichandran	16,795	13.67%	New
BJP	P. Pitchaiammal	1,422	1.16%	New
BSP	A. Sethuraman	1,311	1.07%	New
Independent	S. Prakalathan	1,197	0.97%	New
Margin of victory		6,284	5.12%	−24.51%
Turnout		122,838	69.60%	9.06%
Registered electors		176,484		
AIADMK hold		Swing	-13.99%	

=== 2001 ===
2001 Tamil Nadu Legislative Assembly election: Nilakottai
Party	Candidate	Votes	%	±%
AIADMK	G. Anbazhagan	60,972	57.36%	New
PT	K. Ayyar	29,478	27.73%	New
Independent	A. S. Ponnammal	7,533	7.09%	New
MDMK	K. Periyasamy	2,589	2.44%	−7.75
Independent	M. Jeeva	2,139	2.01%	New
Independent	R. Dhanabalan	1,409	1.33%	New
Independent	V. Selvaraj	1,351	1.27%	New
Independent	P. Gandhi	832	0.78%	New
Margin of victory		31,494	29.63%	0.34%
Turnout		106,303	60.55%	−7.65%
Registered electors		175,612		
AIADMK gain from TMC(M)		Swing	2.88%	

=== 1996 ===
1996 Tamil Nadu Legislative Assembly election: Nilakottai
Party	Candidate	Votes	%	±%
TMC(M)	A. S. Ponnammal	59,541	54.48%	New
INC	A. Rasu	27,538	25.20%	−40.55
MDMK	M. Arivazhaghan	11,128	10.18%	New
AIIC(T)	S. Isaac Raja	7,378	6.75%	New
Independent	Vadi. Rajendran	1,424	1.30%	New
JP	I. Murlimanokar	762	0.70%	New
Margin of victory		32,003	29.28%	−9.95%
Turnout		109,289	68.20%	6.57%
Registered electors		169,442		
TMC(M) gain from INC		Swing	-11.27%	

=== 1991 ===
1991 Tamil Nadu Legislative Assembly election: Nilakottai
Party	Candidate	Votes	%	±%
INC	A. S. Ponnammal	62,110	65.75%	+35.65
DMK	M. Arivazhagan	25,050	26.52%	−2.88
Independent	Vadivel Ravanan	2,384	2.52%	New
Independent	M. Subbulakshmi	2,280	2.41%	New
Independent	V. Kanakaraj	1,094	1.16%	New
Independent	S. Ponnaian	914	0.97%	New
Margin of victory		37,060	39.23%	38.53%
Turnout		94,463	61.63%	−8.54%
Registered electors		161,399		
INC hold		Swing	35.65%	

=== 1989 ===
1989 Tamil Nadu Legislative Assembly election: Nilakottai
Party	Candidate	Votes	%	±%
INC	A. S. Ponnammal	29,654	30.10%	New
DMK	R. Paranthaman	28,962	29.39%	+0.54
AIADMK	G. Anbazhagan	26,861	27.26%	−35.62
AIADMK	P. Chitravelu	10,550	10.71%	−52.18
Independent	V. Kanagaraj	1,112	1.13%	New
Independent	A. Nagammal	762	0.77%	New
Margin of victory		692	0.70%	−33.32%
Turnout		98,530	70.17%	−0.28%
Registered electors		143,421		
INC gain from AIADMK		Swing	-32.79%	

=== 1984 ===
1984 Tamil Nadu Legislative Assembly election: Nilakottai
Party	Candidate	Votes	%	±%
AIADMK	A. Baluchamy	55,162	62.88%	New
DMK	M. Arivazhagan	25,313	28.86%	−9.55
INC(J)	N. Periasamy	5,400	6.16%	New
Independent	S. P. Janakiraman	1,846	2.10%	New
Margin of victory		29,849	34.03%	10.83%
Turnout		87,721	70.46%	5.18%
Registered electors		130,589		
AIADMK gain from Independent		Swing	1.28%	

=== 1980 ===
1980 Tamil Nadu Legislative Assembly election: Nilakottai
Party	Candidate	Votes	%	±%
Independent	A. S. Ponnammal	48,892	61.60%	New
DMK	A. Manivasagam	30,480	38.40%	+22.48
Margin of victory		18,412	23.20%	−10.27%
Turnout		79,372	65.28%	15.92%
Registered electors		123,442		
Independent gain from AIADMK		Swing	10.41%	

=== 1977 ===
1977 Tamil Nadu Legislative Assembly election: Nilakottai
Party	Candidate	Votes	%	±%
AIADMK	A. Baluchamy	28,296	51.19%	New
INC	M. Muthuperiasamy	9,799	17.73%	−21.15
DMK	A. Muniyandi	8,802	15.92%	−45.2
JP	S. K. P. Palusamy	8,378	15.16%	New
Margin of victory		18,497	33.46%	11.22%
Turnout		55,275	49.36%	−19.48%
Registered electors		113,541		
AIADMK gain from DMK		Swing	-9.93%	

=== 1971 ===
1971 Tamil Nadu Legislative Assembly election: Nilakottai
Party	Candidate	Votes	%	±%
DMK	A. Muniyandi	38,583	61.12%	+3.41
INC	A. S. Ponnammal	24,540	38.88%	+0.33
Margin of victory		14,043	22.25%	3.08%
Turnout		63,123	68.84%	−7.15%
Registered electors		97,276		
DMK hold		Swing	3.41%	

=== 1967 ===
1967 Madras Legislative Assembly election: Nilakottai
Party	Candidate	Votes	%	±%
DMK	A. Muniyandi	37,601	57.71%	+27.45
INC	A. S. Ponnammal	25,115	38.55%	+6.8
Independent	M. Paulsamy	1,297	1.99%	New
Independent	M. Muthuperriyasami	576	0.88%	New
Independent	C. S. Madari	562	0.86%	New
Margin of victory		12,486	19.16%	17.68%
Turnout		65,151	75.99%	2.90%
Registered electors		89,095		
DMK gain from INC		Swing	25.97%	

=== 1962 ===
1962 Madras Legislative Assembly election: Nilakottai
Party	Candidate	Votes	%	±%
INC	Abdul Aziz	20,187	31.75%	+3.74
DMK	Ambuchezhian	19,246	30.27%	New
Independent	Veeraraghavier	15,586	24.51%	New
PSP	Guruviah Naidu	6,976	10.97%	New
Independent	Edamalai	1,204	1.89%	New
Independent	Subramanian	388	0.61%	New
Margin of victory		941	1.48%	−7.29%
Turnout		63,587	73.09%	−28.11%
Registered electors		90,229		
INC hold		Swing	3.74%	

=== 1957 ===
1957 Madras Legislative Assembly election: Nilakottai
Party	Candidate	Votes	%	±%
INC	W. P. A. R. Chandrasekaran	43,120	28.01%	+1.73
INC	A. S. Ponnammal (Sc)	29,623	19.24%	−7.03
Independent	T. G. Krishnamoorthy	29,593	19.22%	New
Independent	M. Vadivel (Sc)	14,965	9.72%	New
Independent	S. Kanniyppan (Sc)	10,805	7.02%	New
PSP	P. Pichai	10,704	6.95%	New
Independent	T. Avadaiyappan	9,473	6.15%	New
PSP	S. Vellailannu (Sc)	5,673	3.68%	New
Margin of victory		13,497	8.77%	0.18%
Turnout		153,956	101.20%	16.30%
Registered electors		152,137		
INC hold		Swing	1.73%	

=== 1952 ===
1952 Madras Legislative Assembly election: Nilakottai
Party	Candidate	Votes	%	±%
INC	Ayyanar	34,350	26.28%	New
INC	Muthuthevar	23,120	17.69%	New
Independent	Ponniah Konar	21,347	16.33%	New
Socialist Party (India)	Govindan	16,152	12.36%	New
RPI	Veerabadran	12,969	9.92%	New
CPI	Angamuthu	9,866	7.55%	New
Socialist Party (India)	Vellaikannu	6,158	4.71%	New
Independent	Sonai Muthu	4,271	3.27%	New
Independent	Veerappan	2,495	1.91%	New
Margin of victory		11,230	8.59%	
Turnout		130,728	84.89%	
Registered electors		153,989		
INC win (new seat)				
