= T. Poovendhan =

Indian politician

T. Poovendhan was elected to the Tamil Nadu Legislative Assembly from the Palani constituency in the 1996 elections. The constituency was reserved for candidates from the Scheduled Castes. He was a candidate of the Dravida Munnetra Kazhagam (DMK) party.
