= Palani Assembly constituency =

State assembly constituency in Tamil Nadu, in India

Coordinates: 10.45°N 77.52°E

Palani
- Constituency No. 127 for the Tamil Nadu Legislative Assembly

Constituency details
- Country: India
- Region: South India
- State: Tamil Nadu
- District: Dindigul
- Lok Sabha constituency: Dindigul
- Established: 1951
- Total electors: 2,39,881
- Reservation: None

Member of Legislative Assembly
- 17th Tamil Nadu Legislative Assembly
- Incumbent K. Ravimanoharan
- Party: AIADMK
- Alliance: NDA
- Elected year: 2026

Palani is a state assembly constituency in Dindigul district in Tamil Nadu. Its State Assembly Constituency number is 127. It comes under Dindigul Lok Sabha constituency. It is one of the 234 State Legislative Assembly Constituencies in Tamil Nadu, in India.

== Members of Legislative Assembly ==
=== Madras State ===
Year	Winner	Party
1952	M. P. Mangala Gounder	Independent
1957	Lakshmipathiraj	Indian National Congress
1962	Venkidasamy Gounder	Independent
1967	Krishnamoorthy	Dravida Munnetra Kazhagam

=== Tamil Nadu ===
Year	Winner	Party
1971	C. Palanisamy	Dravida Munnetra Kazhagam
1977	N. Palanivel	Communist Party of India
1980	N. Palanivel	Communist Party of India
1984	A. S. Ponnammal	Indian National Congress
1989	N. Palanivel	Communist Party of India
1991	A. Subburathinam	All India Anna Dravida Munnetra Kazhagam
1996	T. Poovendhan	Dravida Munnetra Kazhagam
2001	M. Chinnasamy	All India Anna Dravida Munnetra Kazhagam
2006	M. Anbalakan	Dravida Munnetra Kazhagam
2011	K. S. N. Venugopalu	All India Anna Dravida Munnetra Kazhagam
2016	I. P. Senthil Kumar	Dravida Munnetra Kazhagam
2021	I. P. Senthil Kumar	Dravida Munnetra Kazhagam
2026	K. Ravimanoharan	All India Anna Dravida Munnetra Kazhagam

== Election results ==
Vote share of winning candidates
2026	32.11%
2021	52.86%
2016	50.66%
2011	48.30%
2006	47.50%
2001	55.65%
1996	57.87%
1991	68.14%
1989	33.21%
1984	66.27%
1980	53.12%
1977	34.53%
1971	55.79%
1967	65.80%
1962	46.32%
1957	52.58%
1952	60.55%

=== 2026 ===
2026 Tamil Nadu Legislative Assembly election: Palani
Party	Candidate	Votes	%	±%
AIADMK	K. Ravimanoharan	66,986	32.11	▼6.12
TVK	M. Praveen Kumar	66,293	31.78	New
CPI(M)	N. Pandi	65,534	31.41	New
NTK	B. Murugeswari	6,300	3.02	▼0.71
NOTA	NOTA	750	0.36	▼0.18
Margin of victory		693	0.33	▼14.30
Turnout		2,08,619	86.97	▲12.88
Registered electors		2,39,881		▼37,333
AIADMK gain from DMK		Swing	▼6.12	

=== 2021 ===
2021 Tamil Nadu Legislative Assembly election: Palani
Party	Candidate	Votes	%	±%
DMK	I. P. Senthil Kumar	108,566	52.86%	+2.2
AIADMK	K. Ravi Manoharan	78,510	38.23%	+0.52
NTK	G. Vinoth Rajasekaran	7,656	3.73%	+3.28
MNM	T. Poovendhan	3,732	1.82%	New
AMMK	V. Veerakumar	2,255	1.10%	New
NOTA	NOTA	1,110	0.54%	−0.2
Margin of victory		30,056	14.63%	1.68%
Turnout		205,384	74.09%	−2.70%
Rejected ballots		117	0.06%	
Registered electors		277,214		
DMK hold		Swing	2.20%	

=== 2016 ===
2016 Tamil Nadu Legislative Assembly election: Palani
Party	Candidate	Votes	%	±%
DMK	I. P. Senthil Kumar	100,045	50.66%	+3.4
AIADMK	P. Kumarasamy	74,459	37.71%	−10.59
CPI(M)	V. Rajamanickam	9,687	4.91%	New
BJP	N. Kanagaraj	4,092	2.07%	+1.05
NOTA	NOTA	1,460	0.74%	New
SDPI	A. Kyzer	1,370	0.69%	New
Margin of victory		25,586	12.96%	11.92%
Turnout		197,474	76.79%	−4.17%
Registered electors		257,151		
DMK gain from AIADMK		Swing	2.36%	

=== 2011 ===
2011 Tamil Nadu Legislative Assembly election: Palani
Party	Candidate	Votes	%	±%
AIADMK	K. S. N. Venugopalu	82,051	48.30%	+9.86
DMK	I. P. Senthil Kumar	80,297	47.27%	−0.23
BJP	K. Deenadayalan	1,745	1.03%	−0.34
Independent	A. Vengudusamy	1,442	0.85%	New
Independent	R. Sivakumar	1,066	0.63%	New
LJP	P. Jayachandheran	884	0.52%	New
Margin of victory		1,754	1.03%	−8.03%
Turnout		209,823	80.97%	6.12%
Registered electors		169,884		
AIADMK gain from DMK		Swing	0.80%	

=== 2006 ===
2006 Tamil Nadu Legislative Assembly election: Palani
Party	Candidate	Votes	%	±%
DMK	M. Anbalakan	57,181	47.50%	+9.77
AIADMK	S. Prema	46,272	38.44%	−17.21
DMDK	P. K. Sundaram	11,369	9.44%	New
BJP	Chinnappan @ Rajendran	1,651	1.37%	New
Independent	S. Periasamy	1,580	1.31%	New
BSP	S. Vijayakumar	849	0.71%	New
Margin of victory		10,909	9.06%	−8.86%
Turnout		120,386	74.84%	13.98%
Registered electors		160,854		
DMK gain from AIADMK		Swing	-8.15%	

=== 2001 ===
2001 Tamil Nadu Legislative Assembly election: Palani
Party	Candidate	Votes	%	±%
AIADMK	M. Chinnasamy	63,611	55.65%	+28.86
DMK	T. Poovendhan	43,124	37.73%	−20.15
MDMK	P. M. Marimuthu	3,985	3.49%	New
Independent	S. Renganathan	1,916	1.68%	New
Margin of victory		20,487	17.92%	−13.17%
Turnout		114,311	60.86%	−7.19%
Registered electors		187,939		
AIADMK gain from DMK		Swing	-2.23%	

=== 1996 ===
1996 Tamil Nadu Legislative Assembly election: Palani
Party	Candidate	Votes	%	±%
DMK	T. Poovendhan	68,246	57.87%	New
AIADMK	P. Karuppuchamy	31,586	26.79%	−41.35
CPI(M)	A. Nagarajan	9,849	8.35%	−21.25
Independent	A. Eswaran	3,582	3.04%	New
BJP	P. Baskaran	3,261	2.77%	New
PMK	K. Chinnaraj	677	0.57%	New
Margin of victory		36,660	31.09%	−7.44%
Turnout		117,924	68.05%	8.21%
Registered electors		180,735		
DMK gain from AIADMK		Swing	-10.26%	

=== 1991 ===
1991 Tamil Nadu Legislative Assembly election: Palani
Party	Candidate	Votes	%	±%
AIADMK	A. Subburathinam	70,404	68.14%	+41.58
CPI(M)	V. Balasekar	30,591	29.61%	−3.6
PMK	D. Dhayalan	2,011	1.95%	New
Margin of victory		39,813	38.53%	35.77%
Turnout		103,326	59.84%	−10.25%
Registered electors		181,002		
AIADMK gain from CPI(M)		Swing	34.93%	

=== 1989 ===
1989 Tamil Nadu Legislative Assembly election: Palani
Party	Candidate	Votes	%	±%
CPI(M)	N. Palanivel	34,379	33.21%	+0.48
INC	B. Panneerselvam Alias Pannirukaiselvan	31,524	30.45%	−35.81
AIADMK	B. Rajaravivarma	27,490	26.56%	New
Independent	B. Ramasamy	8,249	7.97%	New
Margin of victory		2,855	2.76%	−30.78%
Turnout		103,520	70.09%	−3.52%
Registered electors		150,829		
CPI(M) gain from INC		Swing	-33.06%	

=== 1984 ===
1984 Tamil Nadu Legislative Assembly election: Palani
Party	Candidate	Votes	%	±%
INC	A. S. Ponnammal	62,344	66.27%	+21.05
CPI(M)	N. Palanivel	30,794	32.73%	−20.39
INC(J)	M. Umathurai	942	1.00%	New
Margin of victory		31,550	33.54%	25.63%
Turnout		94,080	73.62%	12.05%
Registered electors		133,723		
INC gain from CPI(M)		Swing	13.15%	

=== 1980 ===
1980 Tamil Nadu Legislative Assembly election: Palani
Party	Candidate	Votes	%	±%
CPI(M)	N. Palanivel	41,874	53.12%	+18.59
INC	S. R. P. Mani	35,646	45.22%	+16.26
JP	R. Chandran	1,310	1.66%	New
Margin of victory		6,228	7.90%	2.33%
Turnout		78,830	61.57%	5.65%
Registered electors		129,839		
CPI(M) hold		Swing	18.59%	

=== 1977 ===
1977 Tamil Nadu Legislative Assembly election: Palani
Party	Candidate	Votes	%	±%
CPI(M)	N. Palanivel	23,810	34.53%	+25.56
INC	S. R. P. Mani	19,966	28.96%	−6.29
DMK	K. Krishna Moorthy	17,012	24.67%	−31.12
JP	I. Bathrakali	7,662	11.11%	New
Independent	A. S. Poonamanial	504	0.73%	New
Margin of victory		3,844	5.57%	−14.97%
Turnout		68,954	55.92%	−13.42%
Registered electors		125,061		
CPI(M) gain from DMK		Swing	-21.26%	

=== 1971 ===
1971 Tamil Nadu Legislative Assembly election: Palani
Party	Candidate	Votes	%	±%
DMK	C. Palanisamy	38,919	55.79%	−10.01
INC	R. Subramanian	24,589	35.25%	+1.04
CPI(M)	N. Palanivel	6,256	8.97%	New
Margin of victory		14,330	20.54%	−11.05%
Turnout		69,764	69.34%	−7.40%
Registered electors		104,497		
DMK hold		Swing	-10.01%	

=== 1967 ===
1967 Madras Legislative Assembly election: Palani
Party	Candidate	Votes	%	±%
DMK	Krishnamoorthy	47,671	65.80%	New
INC	Balakrishnan	24,780	34.20%	−0.14
Margin of victory		22,891	31.60%	19.62%
Turnout		72,451	76.74%	−0.99%
Registered electors		96,821		
DMK gain from Independent		Swing	19.48%	

=== 1962 ===
1962 Madras Legislative Assembly election: Palani
Party	Candidate	Votes	%	±%
Independent	Venkidusamy Gounder	29,908	46.32%	New
INC	Lakshmipathi Raju	22,174	34.34%	−18.24
CPI	Rama Raj	11,868	18.38%	New
Independent	Thannasi Alias Palaniappa Gounder	620	0.96%	New
Margin of victory		7,734	11.98%	6.82%
Turnout		64,570	77.72%	22.54%
Registered electors		86,709		
Independent gain from INC		Swing	-6.26%	

=== 1957 ===
1957 Madras Legislative Assembly election: Palani
Party	Candidate	Votes	%	±%
INC	P. S. K. Lakshmipathy Raju	24,772	52.58%	+27.08
Independent	Venkitasami Gounder	22,342	47.42%	New
Margin of victory		2,430	5.16%	−29.89%
Turnout		47,114	55.18%	−9.39%
Registered electors		85,382		
INC gain from Independent		Swing	-7.97%	

=== 1952 ===
1952 Madras Legislative Assembly election: Palani
Party	Candidate	Votes	%	±%
Independent	M. P. Mangala Gounder	25,700	60.55%	New
INC	P. S. K. Lakshmipathi Raju	10,823	25.50%	New
CPI	R. Ramaraj	5,922	13.95%	New
Margin of victory		14,877	35.05%	
Turnout		42,445	64.57%	
Registered electors		65,739		
Independent win (new seat)				
