= A. Venkatesan =

Indian politician

Member of the Tamil Nadu Legislative Assembly
- In office 12 May 2021 – 2026
- Preceded by: K. Manickam
- Constituency: Sholavandan

Personal details
- Party: Dravida Munnetra Kazhagam

A. Venkatesan is an Indian politician who is a Member of Legislative Assembly of Tamil Nadu. He was elected from Sholavandan as a Dravida Munnetra Kazhagam candidate in 2021.

== Elections contested ==
Election	Constituency	Party	Result	Vote %	Runner-up	Runner-up Party	Runner-up vote %
2021 Tamil Nadu Legislative Assembly election	Sholavandan	DMK	Won	48.04%	K. Manickam	ADMK	38.32%
