= I. P. Senthil Kumar =

Indian politician (born 1977)

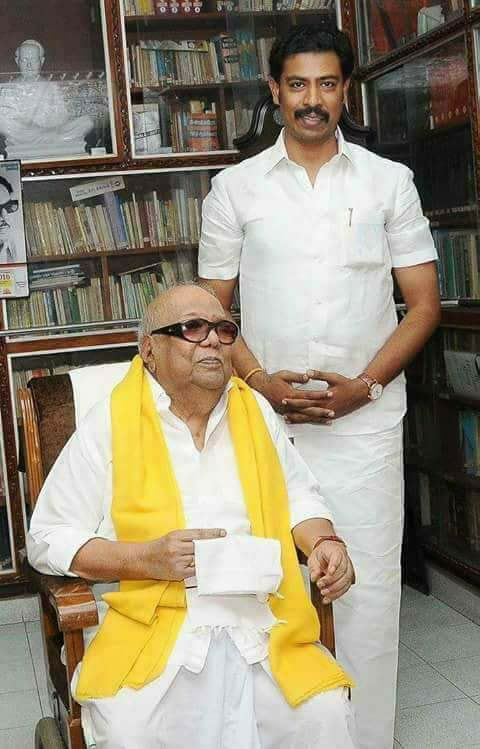
- I. P. Senthil Kumar (standing) with Kalaignar Karunanidhi (sitting in chair)

Member of the Tamil Nadu Legislative Assembly
- Incumbent
- Assumed office 12 May 2026
- Preceded by: Dindigul C. Sreenivasan
- Constituency: Dindigul
- In office 24 May 2016 – 9 May 2026
- Preceded by: K. V. Sekaran
- Succeeded by: K. Ravi Manoharan
- Constituency: Palani

Personal details
- Born: 30 October 1977 (age 49) Batlagundu, Dindigul, Tamil Nadu, India
- Party: DMK
- Parent: I. Periyasamy (father)

Irulappan Periyaswamy Senthil Kumar (born 30 October 1977) is an Indian politician from Tamil Nadu. He is a member of the Tamil Nadu Legislative Assembly from Dindigul Assembly constituency representing Dravida Munnetra Kazhagam (DMK).

== Early life ==
Kumar was born at Batlagundu on 30 October 1977. He is the son of former Minister I.Periyasamy of Athoor Assembly constituency in Tamil Nadu. He became a member of DMK party and served as youth wing leader. Later, he became State Youth Wing Deputy Secretary of DMK party.

== Personal life ==
I. P. Senthil Kumar married Arul Mercy who was formerly a television celebrity. The couple has two children, Irulappan Periyaswamy Senthil Sendur Adavan and I. P. S. Oviya Meenatchi

== Appointments ==
- Former District Youth Wing Deputy Secretary, Dindigul District (DMK PARTY)
- Former State Youth Wing Deputy Secretary (DMK PARTY)
- District Secretary, Dindigul (East) District (DMK PARTY)
- Incumbent M.L.A. Dindigul Constituency

== Elections contested ==
Election	Constituency	Party	Result	Vote %	Runner-up	Runner-up Party	Runner-up vote %	Ref.
2021 Tamil Nadu Legislative Assembly election	Palani	DMK	Won	52.86%	K. Ravi Manoharan	AIADMK	38.23%	
2016 Tamil Nadu Legislative Assembly election	Palani	DMK	Won	50.66%	P. Kumarasamy	AIADMK	37.71%	
2011 Tamil Nadu Legislative Assembly election	Palani	DMK	Lost	47.27%	K. S. N. Venugopalu	AIADMK	48.3%	

== Sources ==
- DMK man in Dindigul after a 15-year gap
- DMK cadre stage protest against erratic drinking water supply
- 12 candidates in Dindigul, 10 in Theni file nominations
- 120 candidates contest in Dindigul district
- http://tamilnadumlas.com/candidate.php?mlaid=12
- Tamil Nadu MLA 2019, List of Tamil Nadu MLA 2019, Tamilnadu Mlas list October 2019
