= Samayanallur Assembly constituency =

Former constituency in Tamil Nadu, India

Coordinates: 9.98°N 78.04°E

Samayanallur
- Former constituency for the Tamil Nadu Legislative Assembly

Constituency details
- Country: India
- Region: South India
- State: Tamil Nadu
- District: Madurai
- Lok Sabha constituency: Madurai
- Established: 1962
- Abolished: 2008
- Total electors: 411,325
- Reservation: SC

Samayanallur was a state assembly constituency in Madurai district in Tamil Nadu. It was a Scheduled Caste reserved constituency. Elections and winners from this constituency are listed below.

== Members of the Legislative Assembly ==
Year	Winner	Party
Madras State
1962	P. Kakkan	Indian National Congress
Tamil Nadu
1977	S. Selvaraj	All India Anna Dravida Munnetra Kazhagam
1980	A. Baluchamy	All India Anna Dravida Munnetra Kazhagam
1984	A. Sivakumar	All India Anna Dravida Munnetra Kazhagam
1989	N. Soundarapandian	Dravida Munnetra Kazhagam
1991	M. Kalirajan	All India Anna Dravida Munnetra Kazhagam
1996	S. Selvaraj	Dravida Munnetra Kazhagam
2001	P. Ponnambalam	All India Anna Dravida Munnetra Kazhagam
2006	A. Tamilarasi Ravikumar	Dravida Munnetra Kazhagam

== Election results ==
Vote share of winning candidates
2006	43.45%
2001	52.67%
1996	60.01%
1991	69.98%
1989	38.06%
1984	58.44%
1980	53.61%
1977	44.50%
1962	52.23%

=== 2006 ===
2006 Tamil Nadu Legislative Assembly election: Samayanallur
Party	Candidate	Votes	%	±%
DMK	A. Tamilarasi	124,656	43.45%	1.59%
AIADMK	P. Lakshmi	119,012	41.48%	−11.19%
DMDK	K. Baskaran	35,684	12.44%	
BJP	S. Palanivelu Swamy	2,005	0.70%	
Independent	D. Veerapandi	1,532	0.53%	
JD(U)	K. Murugavel Rajan	927	0.32%	
AIFB	R. G. Rajasingh	766	0.27%	
BSP	M. Palanichamy	760	0.26%	
Independent	P. Muthukrishnan	629	0.22%	
Independent	S. Suresh	476	0.17%	
Independent	M. P. Thamilappandi	460	0.16%	
Margin of victory		5,644	1.97%	−8.84%
Turnout		286,907	69.75%	17.83%
Registered electors		411,325		
DMK gain from AIADMK		Swing	-9.22%	

=== 2001 ===
2001 Tamil Nadu Legislative Assembly election: Samayanallur
Party	Candidate	Votes	%	±%
AIADMK	P. Ponnampalam	97,060	52.67%	25.46%
DMK	S. Kasthuri Sivasamy	77,136	41.86%	−18.16%
MDMK	P. Chinna Raja	4,803	2.61%	−4.09%
Independent	G. Jeyaraj	1,337	0.73%	
RLD	S. B. Swaminathan	1,141	0.62%	
JP	A. Thirumaraimuthalvan	1,026	0.56%	
Independent	S. Paulraj	515	0.28%	
Independent	S. M. Muthiah Muthuganesan	501	0.27%	
LJP	V. Pandy	270	0.15%	
Independent	P. Somasundaram	250	0.14%	
Independent	A. Pandi	238	0.13%	
Margin of victory		19,924	10.81%	−21.99%
Turnout		184,277	51.92%	−8.94%
Registered electors		354,936		
AIADMK gain from DMK		Swing	-7.34%	

=== 1996 ===
1996 Tamil Nadu Legislative Assembly election: Samayanallur
Party	Candidate	Votes	%	±%
DMK	S. Selvaraj	101,807	60.01%	31.69%
AIADMK	R. Raja Selvaraj	46,159	27.21%	−42.77%
MDMK	P. Pandiammal	11,363	6.70%	
JP	Palanivel Rajan Solai	4,790	2.82%	
BJP	S. Palanivel	2,332	1.37%	
PMK	K. Murugavel Rajan	2,122	1.25%	
Independent	S. Baskar	248	0.15%	
Independent	R. Palanichamy	159	0.09%	
Independent	R. G. Rajasingh	130	0.08%	
Independent	K. M. Murugan	102	0.06%	
Independent	V. Jeevaraj	74	0.04%	
Margin of victory		55,648	32.80%	−8.85%
Turnout		169,638	60.86%	5.15%
Registered electors		292,129		
DMK gain from AIADMK		Swing	-9.97%	

=== 1991 ===
1991 Tamil Nadu Legislative Assembly election: Samayanallur
Party	Candidate	Votes	%	±%
AIADMK	M. Kalirajan	93,161	69.98%	43.30%
DMK	N. Soundarapandian	37,705	28.32%	−9.73%
PMK	S. Sarvathikari	734	0.55%	
Independent	A. Lakshmiperiyasamy	263	0.20%	
THMM	P. Perumal	252	0.19%	
AAP	P. Subbiyan	251	0.19%	
Independent	R. Raguparan	145	0.11%	
Independent	N. Rakkan	127	0.10%	
Independent	K. P. Arasan Alias Boominathan	118	0.09%	
Independent	K. Selvam	96	0.07%	
Independent	I. Thiagarajan	79	0.06%	
Margin of victory		55,456	41.66%	30.28%
Turnout		133,126	55.72%	−11.68%
Registered electors		245,314		
AIADMK gain from DMK		Swing	31.92%	

=== 1989 ===
1989 Tamil Nadu Legislative Assembly election: Samayanallur
Party	Candidate	Votes	%	±%
DMK	N. Soundarapandian	53,360	38.06%	−2.52%
AIADMK	O. P. Eraman	37,410	26.68%	−31.76%
INC	V. Maruthaimuthu	29,106	20.76%	
AIADMK	S. M. Muthian Muthuganesan	18,629	13.29%	−45.16%
Independent	A. Lakshmi Periyasami	472	0.34%	
Independent	G. Pandian	360	0.26%	
Independent	K. Kumar	259	0.18%	
Independent	S. Vellaisamy	204	0.15%	
Independent	P. Pandi	200	0.14%	
Independent	K. Periyasamy	151	0.11%	
Independent	K. Jerayaman	61	0.04%	
Margin of victory		15,950	11.38%	−6.49%
Turnout		140,212	67.40%	−4.22%
Registered electors		212,675		
DMK gain from AIADMK		Swing	-20.39%	

=== 1984 ===
1984 Tamil Nadu Legislative Assembly election: Samayanallur
Party	Candidate	Votes	%	±%
AIADMK	A. Sivakumar	65,883	58.44%	4.83%
DMK	S. Selvaraj	45,746	40.58%	−4.92%
Independent	A. Lakshimi Perisamy	394	0.35%	
Independent	S. Renuga	372	0.33%	
Independent	P. Ponnamaravarthy	336	0.30%	
Margin of victory		20,137	17.86%	9.76%
Turnout		112,731	71.62%	8.92%
Registered electors		166,057		
AIADMK hold		Swing	4.83%	

=== 1980 ===
1980 Tamil Nadu Legislative Assembly election: Samayanallur
Party	Candidate	Votes	%	±%
AIADMK	A. Baluchamy	50,612	53.61%	9.11%
DMK	P. Subashchandra Bose	42,958	45.50%	30.48%
Independent	M. Chinnappan	303	0.32%	
Independent	Rakkan	284	0.30%	
Independent	K. Muniyandi	253	0.27%	
Margin of victory		7,654	8.11%	−10.68%
Turnout		94,410	62.69%	3.43%
Registered electors		152,150		
AIADMK hold		Swing	9.11%	

=== 1977 ===
1977 Tamil Nadu Legislative Assembly election: Samayanallur
Party	Candidate	Votes	%	±%
AIADMK	S. Selvaraj	34,019	44.50%	
INC	C. Karuthanan	19,658	25.71%	
DMK	P. Subhas Chandra Bose	11,484	15.02%	
JP	P. Vadivelu	9,733	12.73%	
Independent	P. Selvaraj	685	0.90%	
Independent	M. Rakkan	526	0.69%	
Independent	S. Karmegam	343	0.45%	
Margin of victory		14,361	18.79%	
Turnout		76,448	59.27%	
Registered electors		130,768		
AIADMK win (new seat)				
