= S. Selvaraj =

Indian politician

S. Selvaraj (died 25 November 2012) was an Indian politician and a minister in the Dravida Munnetra Kazhagam-led Government of Tamil Nadu between 1996 and 2001.

== Political career ==
Selvaraj was elected to the Tamil Nadu legislative assembly as a Dravida Munnetra Kazhagam (DMK) candidate from Samayanallur constituency in the 1996 election. The constituency was reserved for candidates from the Scheduled Castes.

Selvaraj was a Dalit and served as Minister for Adi Dravidar Welfare, Hill Tribes and Bonded Labour during the DMK-led government of 1996-2001. In October 1998, he was one of four DMK ministers sent to help relieve tensions in Ramanathapuram district after violence between Dalits and members of the Thevar caste had resulted in 11 deaths. Later, in the 2001 elections, the perceived pro-Dalit stance of the DMK resulted in a backlash by voters from the Other Backwards Classes and Selvaraj's assembly seat was among those lost.

== Legal issues ==
There was confusion in 2011 when Selvaraj and 27 other DMK members were arrested in relation to a charge dating from 2001 when they had protested against the arrest of Karunanidhi, the former DMK Chief Minister. The defendants thought that the case had been withdrawn. He had also been investigated in 2002 when the new Chief Minister, Jayalalithaa of the All India Anna Dravida Munnetra Kazhagam (AIADMK) targeted several officials from the prior DMK government whom she considered held assets that were disproportionate to their income. There were suggestions that Jayalalithaa was engaging in a political tit-for-tat related to court cases filed against AIADMK people by the DMK when that party had been in power. By July 2003, virtually all of the 24 ministers of the former DMK government were under investigation, and Selvaraj was one of three against whom chargesheets had been issued.

== Death ==
Selvaraj, who had been suffering ill-health due to a kidney problem, died on 25 November 2012, aged 66 or 67. He was cremated in his home village of Meenakshipuram Pudur and was survived by a son and two daughters. One of his daughters, B. Chithra Selvi, was controversially nominated as a DMK candidate for the Manamadurai constituency in the 2016 state assembly election. Local party workers thought that she was unsuitable because she came from Chennai.
