= R. Ayyanar =

Indian politician

Member of the Tamil Nadu Legislative Assembly
- Incumbent
- Assumed office 11 May 2026
- Preceded by: S. Thenmozhi
- Constituency: Nilakottai

Personal details
- Party: Tamilaga Vettri Kazhagam
- Profession: Politician

Raman Ayyanar (born 1988) is an Indian politician from Tamil Nadu. He is a member of the Tamil Nadu Legislative Assembly from Nilakottai Assembly constituency, which is reserved for Scheduled Caste community in Dindigul district, representing Tamilaga Vettri Kazhagam.

== Early life and education ==
Ayyanar is from Nilakottai, Dindigul district, Tamil Nadu. He is the son of C. Raman. He is a building equipment supplier. He did his BBA at Palani Andavar College, Palani in 2009 and later completed his M.Com. also at Palani Andavar Collage in 2011.

== Political career ==
Ayyanar won the Nilakottai seat in the 2026 Tamil Nadu Legislative Assembly election as a candidate of Tamilaga Vettri Kazhagam. He received 68,580 votes and defeated S. Nagajothi of the Dravida Munnetra Kazhagam by a margin of 2,925 votes.
