= P. S. K. Lakshmipathy Raju =

Indian freedom fighter and politician associated with the Indian National Congress

Member of Tamil Nadu Legislative Council
- In office 1957–1962
- Preceded by: M. P. Mangala Gounder
- Succeeded by: Venkidasamy Gounder
- Constituency: Palani

Personal details
- Born: 10 December 1913 Palani, Madras Presidency, British India
- Died: 4 November 1989 (aged 75)
- Party: Indian National Congress

Palani S. Krishnasamy Lakshmipathy Raju (10 December 1913 – 4 November 1989) was an Indian freedom fighter and politician associated with the Indian National Congress from Tamil Nadu.

== Early life ==
Lakshmipathy Raju was born on 10 December 1913 in Palani, Madras Presidency, British India to S. Krishnasamy Raju and Nallammal. He received his education at Palani Municipal High School. In 1930, he founded the Harijan Seva Sangh, an organization aimed at the upliftment of Dalits.

== Involvement in Indian freedom struggle ==
Raju was deeply inspired by his father, who was involved in the freedom struggle and held various roles in the Indian National Congres at local and state levels from 1927. He took part in major independence movements and was jailed for six months during the Civil Disobedience Movement in 1932. He was jailed for six months again during the Individual Satyagraha in 1941. During the Quit India Movement (1942), he was detained under Section 38(5) of the Defence of India Rules and sentenced to three months imprisonment. Throughout his involvement in the independence movement, he was incarcerated in several jails, including those in Madurai, Bellary, Alipore, Vellore, Tanjore, Palayamkottai, and Madras.

== Public service ==
In 1945, he became a member of the Palani Municipal Council and later served as its chairman for five years. He sponsored the Fishermen Co-operative Scheme and served as its president for Palani Taluk from 1948 to 1957. Raju also held leadership positions in trade unions, including Vice President of the Tamil Nadu Indian National Trade Union Congress and Member of the General Committee of the Indian National Trade Union Congress.

Raju also served as Director of the Co-operative House Construction Society, President of the Madurai Co-operative Stores, and Convener of the Bhoodan Movement. He actively supported the Bharat Sevak Samaj.

== Legislative career ==
In 1957, he was elected as a Member of the Tamil Nadu Legislative Council from Palani constituency.

== Death and legacy ==
P. S. K. Lakshmipathy Raju died on 4 November 1989.
