= A. Baluchamy =

Indian politician (1941–2012)

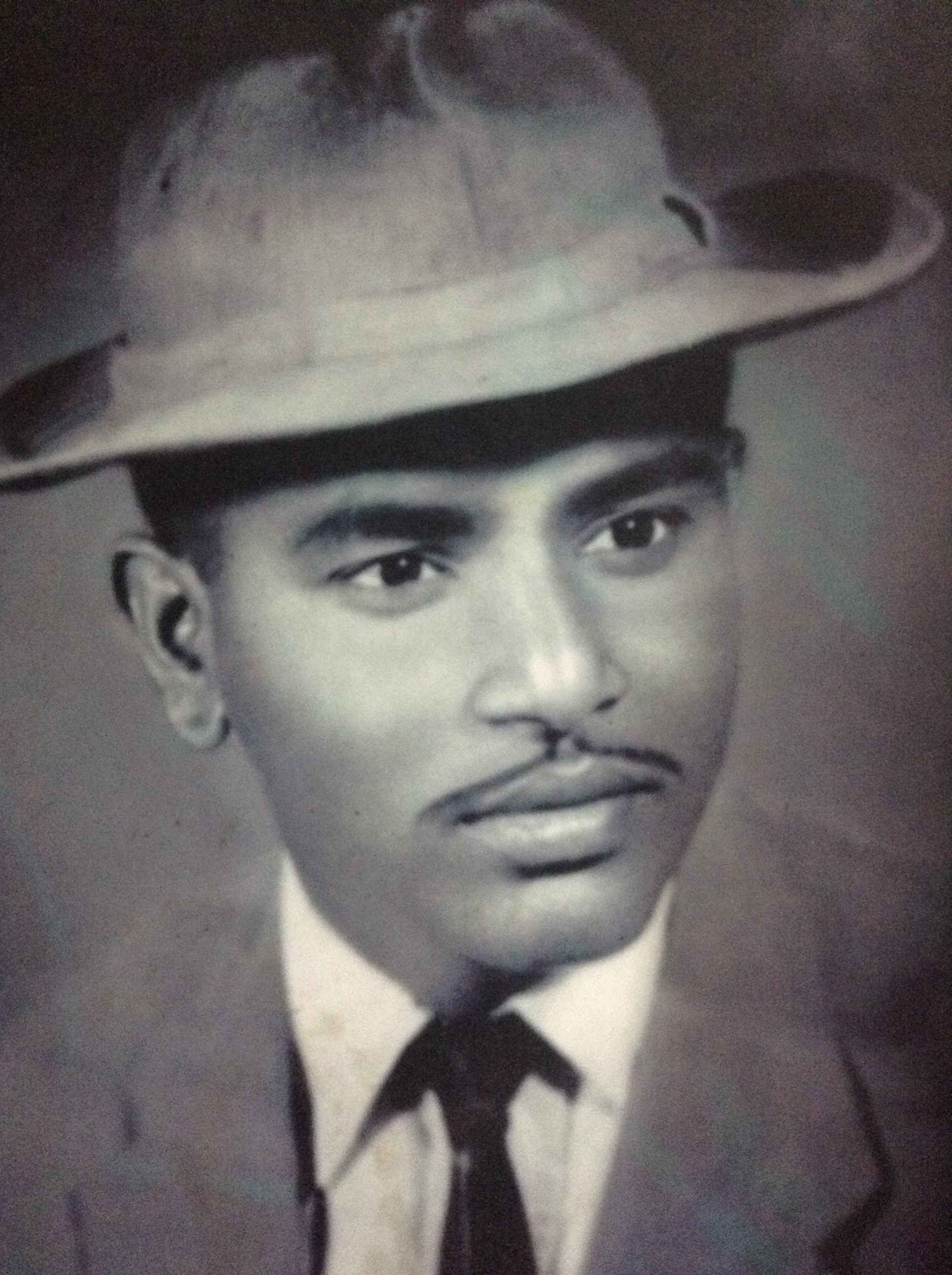
A. Baluchamy - Farmer, Army Veteran & Politician

Alagumalai Baluchamy was an Indian politician and Member of the Legislative Assembly of Tamil Nadu. He was elected to the Tamil Nadu legislative assembly as an Anna Dravida Munnetra Kazhagam candidate from Nilakottai constituency in 1977, and 1984 elections and from Samayanallur constituency in 1980 election.

== Political career ==
Baluchamy's entry into politics was inspired by M.G. Ramachandran (MGR), the founder of the All India Anna Dravida Munnetra Kazhagam (AIADMK). He was deeply influenced by MGR's vision of social justice and upliftment of the poor, which led him to join AIADMK and actively work towards the welfare of his community.

His dedication to public service and his strong grassroots presence helped him secure multiple electoral victories. He was elected as a Member of the Legislative Assembly (MLA) for three consecutive terms:

- 1977 – Nilakottai Constituency (AIADMK)
- 1980 – Samayanallur Constituency (AIADMK)
- 1984 – Nilakottai Constituency (AIADMK)

As an MLA, Baluchamy championed several development initiatives, including:

- Improving rural infrastructure and road connectivity
- Advocating for farmer welfare schemes
- Strengthening irrigation and water management in agricultural areas
- Expanding education and healthcare access in rural communities

Election results

1977

[edit]

1977 Tamil Nadu Legislative Assembly election: Nilakottai
Party	Candidate	Votes	%	±%
AIADMK	A. Baluchamy	28,296	51.19%	New
INC	M. Muthuperiasamy	9,799	17.73%	−21.15
DMK	A. Muniyandi	8,802	15.92%	−45.2
JP	S. K. P. Palusamy	8,378	15.16%	New
Margin of victory		18,497	33.46%	11.22%
Turnout		55,275	49.36%	−19.48%
Registered electors		113,541		
AIADMK gain from DMK		Swing	-9.93%	

1980

[edit]

1980 Tamil Nadu Legislative Assembly election: Samayanallur
Party	Candidate	Votes	%	±%
AIADMK	A. Baluchamy	50,612	53.61%	9.11%
DMK	P. Subashchandra Bose	42,958	45.50%	30.48%
Independent	M. Chinnappan	303	0.32%	
Independent	Rakkan	284	0.30%	
Independent	K. Muniyandi	253	0.27%	
Margin of victory		7,654	8.11%	−10.68%
Turnout		94,410	62.69%	3.43%
Registered electors		152,150		
AIADMK hold		Swing	9.11%	

1984

[edit]

1984 Tamil Nadu Legislative Assembly election: Nilakottai
Party	Candidate	Votes	%	±%
AIADMK	A. Baluchamy	55,162	62.88%	New
DMK	M. Arivazhagan	25,313	28.86%	−9.55
INC(J)	N. Periasamy	5,400	6.16%	New
Independent	S. P. Janakiraman	1,846	2.10%	New
Margin of victory		29,849	34.03%	10.83%
Turnout		87,721	70.46%	5.18%
Registered electors		130,589		
AIADMK gain from Independent		Swing	1.28%	
