= Natham R. Viswanathan =

Indian politician

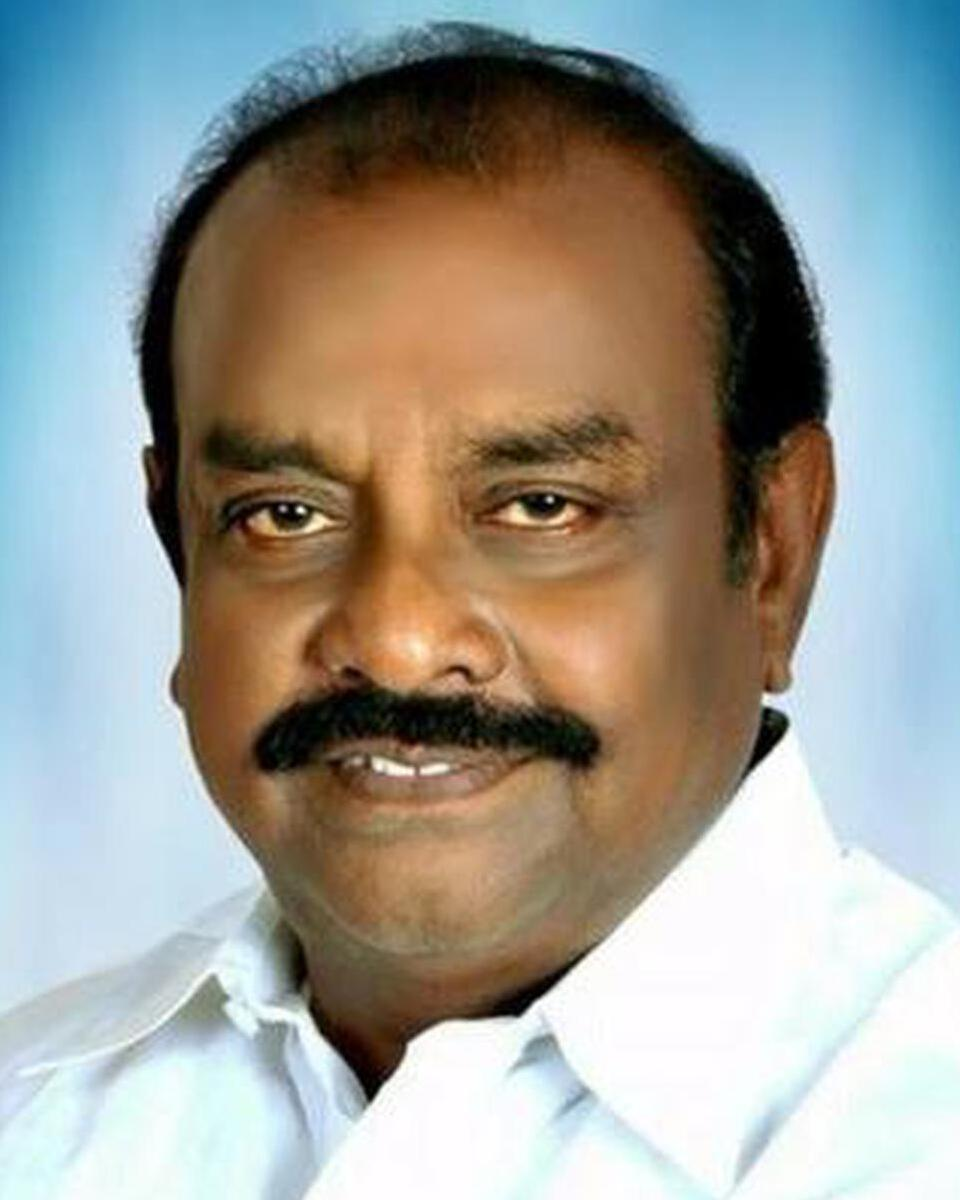

Deputy General Secretary of All India Anna Dravida Munnetra Kazhagam
- Incumbent
- Assumed office 11 July 2022 Serving with K. P. Munusamy
- General Secretary: Edappadi K. Palaniswami
- Preceded by: T. T. V. Dhinakaran

Organisation Secretary of All India Anna Dravida Munnetra Kazhagam
- In office 21 August 2017 – 11 July 2022
- Co-ordinators: O. Pannerselvam; Edappadi K. Palaniswamy

Minister for Electricity, Prohibition & Excise, Government of Tamil Nadu
- In office 16 May 2011 – 23 May 2016
- Chief Minister: J. Jayalalithaa; O. Pannerselvam
- Preceded by: Arcot N. Veeraswami
- Succeeded by: P. Thangamani

Minister for Transport, Government of Tamil Nadu
- In office 14 May 2001 – 12 May 2006
- Chief Minister: J. Jayalalithaa; O. Panneerselvam
- Preceded by: K. Ponmudy
- Succeeded by: K. N. Nehru

Member of the Tamil Nadu Legislative Assembly
- Incumbent
- Assumed office 6 October 1999
- Preceded by: M. Andi Ambalam
- Constituency: Natham

Personal details
- Born: Viswanathan; 11 December 1949 (age 76) Uluppakudi, Natham, Tamil Nadu, India
- Party: All India Anna Dravida Munnetra Kazhagam
- Children: Amarnath, Kavitha, Ranjitha
- Parent: A. Ramanathan (father)
- Education: Alagappa College

Natham R. Viswanathan (born 11 December 1949) is an Indian politician and deputy general secretary of All India Anna Dravida Munnetra Kazhagam. He is a member of the Tamil Nadu Legislative Assembly from Natham Constituency. He was the Minister for Electricity and Prohibition and Excise, Govt. of Tamil Nadu. Previously, he was elected to the Tamil Nadu legislative assembly as an Anna Dravida Munnetra Kazhagam candidate from Natham constituency in 1999 after the death of then legislative member of Natham, M. Andi Ambalam. He has won consecutively in 2001, 2006 and 2011 elections in a landslide vote count and has a cult following.
