= M. A. Andi Ambalam =

Indian politician

M. A. Andi Ambalam was elected to the Tamil Nadu Legislative Assembly from the Natham constituency in the 2016 elections. He was a candidate of the Dravida Munnetra Kazhagam (DMK) party. He is the son of M. Andi Ambalam who served as MLA of Natham constituency from 1977 to 1999 until his death. In 2006, After disagreement with Congress he joined to Dravida Munnetra Kazhagam and contested in election. In 2011, he was contested as Independent in Nagara Symbol after his nomination was denied by Dravida Munnetra Kazhagam.

== His father ==
His father, M. Andi Ambalam, was elected to the Tamil Nadu legislative assembly as an Indian National Congress candidate from Natham constituency in 1977, 1984, 1989 and 1991 elections and as an Indian National Congress (Indira) candidate in 1980 election and as a Tamil Maanila Congress candidate in 1996 election. Ambalam died on 28 March 1999.

== Electoral performance ==
2021 Tamil Nadu Legislative Assembly election: Natham
Party	Candidate	Votes	%	±%
AIADMK	Natham. R. Viswanathan	107,762	48.15	+3.85
DMK	M. A. Andi Ambalam	95,830	42.82	−2.5
NTK	Dr. V. Sivasankaran	14,762	6.60	+5.44
AMMK	N. Raja	1,721	0.77	New
NOTA	NOTA	1,444	0.65	−0.25
Margin of victory		11,932	5.33	4.31
Turnout		223,800	79.01	−1.01
Rejected ballots		331	0.15	
Registered electors		283,267		
AIADMK gain from DMK		Swing	2.83	

2016 Tamil Nadu Legislative Assembly election: Natham
Party	Candidate	Votes	%	±%
DMK	M. A. Andi Ambalam	93,822	45.32	+21.57
AIADMK	S. Shahjahan	91,712	44.30	−9.57
DMDK	G. Karthikeyan	9,373	4.53	New
NTK	Dr. V. Sivasankaran	2,393	1.16	New
NOTA	NOTA	1,844	0.89	New
Independent	M. Vadivel	1,182	0.57	New
PMK	K. Seerangan	1,155	0.56	New
Independent	C. Murugasan	1,065	0.51	New
IJK	M. Sandhanakrishan	1,044	0.50	New
Margin of victory		2,110	1.02	−29.1
Turnout		207,011	80.01	−4.94
Registered electors		258,718		
DMK gain from AIADMK		Swing	-8.55	

2011 Tamil Nadu Legislative Assembly election: Natham
Party	Candidate	Votes	%	±%
AIADMK	Natham R. Viswanathan	94,947	53.87	+7.25
DMK	K. Vijayan	41,858	23.75	−20.06
Independent	M. A. Andi Ambalam	29,834	16.93	New
Independent	K. Durai	1,870	1.06	New
Independent	G. Venkatesan	1,038	0.59	New
BJP	C. Kuttiyan	980	0.56	−0.22
Margin of victory		53,089	30.12	27.31
Turnout		207,464	84.95	10.46
Registered electors		176,251		
AIADMK hold		Swing	7.25	

2006 Tamil Nadu Legislative Assembly election: Natham
Party	Candidate	Votes	%	±%
AIADMK	Natham R. Viswanathan	62,292	46.62	−2.79
DMK	M. A. Andi Ambalam	58,532	43.81	New
DMDK	V. Ganeshan	7,754	5.80	New
Independent	P. Vedikaran	1,762	1.32	New
BJP	A. Saravanan	1,038	0.78	New
BSP	A. Murugesan	711	0.53	New
Margin of victory		3,760	2.81	−6.61
Turnout		133,614	74.49	12.45
Registered electors		179,371		
AIADMK hold		Swing	-2.79	
