= A. Ramasamy =

Indian politician

A. Ramasamy is an Indian politician and incumbent Member of the Tamil Nadu Legislative Assembly from the Nilakottai constituency. He represents the Puthiya Tamilagam party.
