= A. Chandrasekaran =

Indian politician

A. Chandrasekaran is an Indian politician and former Member of the Legislative Assembly of Tamil Nadu. He was elected to the Tamil Nadu legislative assembly as an Indian National Congress (Indira) candidate from Sholavandan constituency in 1980 election, and as an Indian National Congress candidate in 1984 elections.
