= P. S. Maniyan =

Indian politician

Member of the Tamil Nadu Legislative Assembly
- In office 1967 - 1972; 1971 - 1976
- Constituency: Sholavandan

Personal details
- Political party: Dravida Munnetra Kazhagam

P. S. Maniyan is an Indian politician and former Member of the Legislative Assembly of Tamil Nadu. He was elected to the Tamil Nadu legislative assembly as a Dravida Munnetra Kazhagam candidate from Sholavandan constituency in the 1967, and 1971 elections.
