= Natham Assembly constituency =

One of the 234 State Legislative Assembly Constituencies in Tamil Nadu, in India

Coordinates: 10.23°N 78.23°E

Natham
- Constituency No. 131 for the Tamil Nadu Legislative Assembly

Constituency details
- Country: India
- Region: South India
- State: Tamil Nadu
- District: Dindigul
- Lok Sabha constituency: Dindigul
- Established: 1977
- Total electors: 2,61,393
- Reservation: None

Member of Legislative Assembly
- 17th Tamil Nadu Legislative Assembly
- Incumbent Natham R. Viswanathan
- Party: AIADMK
- Alliance: NDA
- Elected year: 2026

Natham is a state assembly constituency in Dindigul district in Tamil Nadu. Its State Assembly Constituency number is 131. It comes under Dindigul Lok Sabha constituency for national elections. It is one of the 234 State Legislative Assembly Constituencies in Tamil Nadu, in India. Elections and winners from this constituency are listed below.

== Members of Legislative Assembly ==
Year	Winner	Party
1977	M. Andi Ambalam	Indian National Congress
1980	M. Andi Ambalam	Indian National Congress (I)
1984	M. Andi Ambalam	Indian National Congress
1989	M. Andi Ambalam	Indian National Congress
1991	M. Andi Ambalam	Indian National Congress
1996	M. Andi Ambalam	Tamil Maanila Congress
1999^	Natham R. Viswanathan	All India Anna Dravida Munnetra Kazhagam
2001	Natham R. Viswanathan	All India Anna Dravida Munnetra Kazhagam
2006	Natham R. Viswanathan	All India Anna Dravida Munnetra Kazhagam
2011	Natham R. Viswanathan	All India Anna Dravida Munnetra Kazhagam
2016	Natham R. Viswanathan	All India Anna Dravida Munnetra Kazhagam
2021	Natham R. Viswanathan	All India Anna Dravida Munnetra Kazhagam
2026	Natham R. Viswanathan	All India Anna Dravida Munnetra Kazhagam

== Election results ==
Vote share of winning candidates
2026	35.84%
2021	48.15%
2016	45.32%
2011	53.87%
2006	46.62%
2001	49.41%
1996	57.33%
1991	73.02%
1989	33.21%
1984	68.48%
1980	46.21%
1977	44.97%

=== 2026 ===
2026 Tamil Nadu Legislative Assembly election: Natham
Party	Candidate	Votes	%	±%
AIADMK	Natham R. Viswanathan	85,708	35.84	▼12.31
DMK	Selvakumar K	73,839	30.88	▼11.94
TVK	L.N. Ramesh	64,997	27.18	New
NTK	Alagammal A	9,677	4.05	▼2.55
TVK	Alex S	715	0.30	New
NOTA	NOTA	596	0.25	▼0.40
Independent	Vadivel K	584	0.24	New
Independent	Vijayakumar S	465	0.19	New
Independent	Gopal R	307	0.13	New
Independent	Murugesan C	289	0.12	New
Independent	Murugan K	273	0.11	New
Aanaithinthiya Jananayaka Pathukappu Kazhagam	Rajasekaran P	247	0.10	New
Independent	Maria Arockiam S	245	0.10	New
Independent	Rama Janarthanan S	233	0.10	New
Independent	Venkatesh P	175	0.07	New
Independent	Satham Usain M	155	0.06	New
Independent	Venkatesan G	149	0.06	New
Independent	Manikandan V	138	0.06	New
Independent	Tamilselvan C	111	0.05	New
PT	Vijayakumar S	103	0.04	New
Independent	Dhandabani K	81	0.03	New
Independent	Sundar C	53	0.02	New
Margin of victory		11,869	4.96	▼0.37
Turnout		2,39,140	91.49	▲12.48
Registered electors		2,61,393		▼21,874
AIADMK hold		Swing	▼12.31	

=== 2021 ===
2021 Tamil Nadu Legislative Assembly election: Natham
Party	Candidate	Votes	%	±%
AIADMK	Natham. R. Viswanathan	107,762	48.15	+3.85
DMK	M. A. Andi Ambalam	95,830	42.82	−2.5
NTK	Dr. V. Sivasankaran	14,762	6.60	+5.44
AMMK	N. Raja	1,721	0.77	New
NOTA	NOTA	1,444	0.65	−0.25
Margin of victory		11,932	5.33	4.31
Turnout		223,800	79.01	−1.01
Rejected ballots		331	0.15	
Registered electors		283,267		
AIADMK gain from DMK		Swing	2.83	

=== 2016 ===
2016 Tamil Nadu Legislative Assembly election: Natham
Party	Candidate	Votes	%	±%
AIADMK	Natham R. Viswanathan	93,822	45.32	+21.57
DMK	M. A. Andi Ambalam	91,712	44.30	−9.57
DMDK	G. Karthikeyan	9,373	4.53	New
NTK	Dr. V. Sivasankaran	2,393	1.16	New
NOTA	NOTA	1,844	0.89	New
Independent	M. Vadivel	1,182	0.57	New
PMK	K. Seerangan	1,155	0.56	New
Independent	C. Murugasan	1,065	0.51	New
IJK	M. Sandhanakrishan	1,044	0.50	New
Margin of victory		2,110	1.02	−29.1
Turnout		207,011	80.01	−4.94
Registered electors		258,718		
AIADMK hold		Swing	-7.53	

=== 2011 ===
2011 Tamil Nadu Legislative Assembly election: Natham
Party	Candidate	Votes	%	±%
AIADMK	Natham R. Viswanathan	94,947	53.87	+7.25
DMK	K. Vijayan	41,858	23.75	−20.06
Independent	M. A. Andi Ambalam	29,834	16.93	New
Independent	K. Durai	1,870	1.06	New
Independent	G. Venkatesan	1,038	0.59	New
BJP	C. Kuttiyan	980	0.56	−0.22
Margin of victory		53,089	30.12	27.31
Turnout		207,464	84.95	10.46
Registered electors		176,251		
AIADMK hold		Swing	7.25	

=== 2006 ===
2006 Tamil Nadu Legislative Assembly election: Natham
Party	Candidate	Votes	%	±%
AIADMK	Natham R. Viswanathan	62,292	46.62	−2.79
DMK	M. A. Andi Ambalam	58,532	43.81	New
DMDK	V. Ganeshan	7,754	5.80	New
Independent	P. Vedikaran	1,762	1.32	New
BJP	A. Saravanan	1,038	0.78	New
BSP	A. Murugesan	711	0.53	New
Margin of victory		3,760	2.81	−6.61
Turnout		133,614	74.49	12.45
Registered electors		179,371		
AIADMK hold		Swing	-2.79	

=== 2001 ===
2001 Tamil Nadu Legislative Assembly election: Natham
Party	Candidate	Votes	%	±%
AIADMK	Natham R. Viswanathan	55,604	49.41	New
Thamilar Bhoomi	Ku. Pa. Krishnan	45,002	39.99	New
MDMK	P. Chellam	5,311	4.72	−5.24
Independent	P. George	1,596	1.42	New
Independent	O. P. Raman	1,019	0.91	New
JD(S)	V. Muthuramalingam	935	0.83	New
Independent	A. Andi Ambalam	879	0.78	New
Independent	Venkata Subramani K	590	0.52	New
Independent	N. Rajangam	589	0.52	New
Margin of victory		10,602	9.42	−23.25
Turnout		112,540	62.04	−6.77
Registered electors		181,487		
AIADMK gain from TMC(M)		Swing	-7.92	

=== 1996 ===
1996 Tamil Nadu Legislative Assembly election: Natham
Party	Candidate	Votes	%	±%
TMC(M)	M. Andi Ambalam	62,527	57.33	New
INC	S. Asai Alangaram	26,891	24.66	−48.37
MDMK	P. Chellam	10,864	9.96	New
PMK	S. Balasubramaniam	6,524	5.98	New
BJP	P. R. Chellamani	1,489	1.37	New
Margin of victory		35,636	32.67	−15.85
Turnout		109,063	68.81	3.71
Registered electors		167,867		
TMC(M) gain from INC		Swing	-15.69	

=== 1991 ===
1991 Tamil Nadu Legislative Assembly election: Natham
Party	Candidate	Votes	%	±%
INC	M. Andi Ambalam	71,902	73.02	+39.81
DMK	P. Cheliam	24,124	24.50	−1.7
AMI	P. Mani	797	0.81	New
PMK	A. Karamagam	770	0.78	New
Margin of victory		47,778	48.52	43.04
Turnout		98,465	65.10	−9.54
Registered electors		156,966		
INC hold		Swing	39.81	

=== 1989 ===
1989 Tamil Nadu Legislative Assembly election: Natham
Party	Candidate	Votes	%	±%
INC	M. Andi Ambalam	33,019	33.21	−35.27
AIADMK	R. Visvanathan	27,567	27.73	New
DMK	P. Chellam	26,048	26.20	New
AIADMK	S. A. Veeriah	10,653	10.71	New
Independent	A. Veeranan	1,174	1.18	New
Independent	Pillai. Ramalingam	649	0.65	New
Margin of victory		5,452	5.48	−41.45
Turnout		99,426	74.64	1.46
Registered electors		136,669		
INC hold		Swing	-35.27	

=== 1984 ===
1984 Tamil Nadu Legislative Assembly election: Natham
Party	Candidate	Votes	%	±%
INC	M. Andi Ambalam	57,214	68.48	New
TNC(K)	T. Alagirisamy	18,004	21.55	New
Independent	K. P. Thiagarajan	4,755	5.69	New
Independent	C. Periakaruppan	1,842	2.20	New
Independent	A. Andi	1,215	1.45	New
Independent	V. Sockalingam	519	0.62	New
Margin of victory		39,210	46.93	1.44
Turnout		83,549	73.18	12.22
Registered electors		121,608		
INC gain from Independent		Swing	22.26	

=== 1980 ===
1980 Tamil Nadu Legislative Assembly election: Natham
Party	Candidate	Votes	%	±%
Independent	T. Alagarsamy	32,471	46.21	New
Independent	A. Somasundaram	509	0.72	New
Independent	C. Manickam	422	0.60	New
Margin of victory		31,962	45.49	33.17
Turnout		70,261	60.96	3.14
Registered electors		117,138		
Independent gain from INC		Swing	1.25	

=== 1977 ===
1977 Tamil Nadu Legislative Assembly election: Natham
Party	Candidate	Votes	%	±%
INC	M. Andi Ambalam	29,055	44.97	New
AIADMK	R. Murugan	21,093	32.65	New
DMK	P. S. A. Vellayappa	10,515	16.27	New
JP	K. Perumalsamy	3,161	4.89	New
Independent	A. Somasundaram	786	1.22	New
Margin of victory		7,962	12.32	
Turnout		64,610	57.82	
Registered electors		113,284		
INC win (new seat)				
