= A. Muniyandi =

Indian politician

A. Muniyandi was an Indian politician and former Member of the Legislative Assembly of Tamil Nadu. He was elected to the Tamil Nadu legislative assembly as a Dravida Munnetra Kazhagam candidate from Nilakottai constituency in the 1967, and 1971 elections.
