= N. Palanivel =

Indian politician

N. Palanivel is an Indian politician and former Member of the Legislative Assembly of Tamil Nadu. He was elected to the Tamil Nadu legislative assembly as a Communist Party of India (Marxist) candidate from Palani constituency in 1977 election, 1980, and 1989 elections.
