= K. Manickam =

Indian politician, Sholavandan Legislative Assemblyman 2016

Thiru K. Manickam
- Occupations: Politician, farmer, businessman
- Political party: All India Anna Dravida Munnetra Kazhagam

Thiru K. Manickam is a member of the 15th Tamil Nadu Legislative Assembly from Sholavandan constituency. Sholavandan legislator K. Manickam is one of the leaders of AIADMK's eleven-member steering committee representatives of Devendrakula Velalar community, which hails from the southern belt. He is a staunch loyalist to AIADMK.

== Madurai Kamaraj University's senate ==
K. Manickam from Sholavandan is among the 4 MLA's from the region nominated to be part of the senate.
