= Anaithinthiya Thamizhaga Munnetra Kazhagam =

Anaithinthiya Thamizhaga Munnetra Kazhagam Thamizhaga Munnetra Kazhagam
- Founder: Dr. Guruswamy Siddhan
- Headquarters: 10/2 Nalvar Nagar Kalveerampalayam Bharathiar University (Post), Coimbatore, Tamil Nadu, India 641048

Anaithinthiya Thamizhaga Munnetra Kazhagam (All India Federation for the Progress of Tamilians) is a political party in Tamil Nadu, India. It is registered with the Election Commission of India. Founded by, Dr Guruswami Siddhan, This is a registered political party aiming to unite Mallars and promote political awareness and unity among Devendra Kula Velalars. The party was launched on October 23, 1995, in Madurai, with around 100,000 participants, marking the largest rally in Madurai at that time, supported by a significant police presence.

This party educates Mallars on politics, political theories, and the current caste politics of Tamil Nadu and India. It aims to unite Mallars, Kudumbars, and Devendra Kula Velalars on a political platform, emphasizing that caste unity must be converted into political unity to gain political status and act as a pressure group. The party has contested elections in 1996 and subsequent elections.

== Founder ==
Dr. Guruswami Siddhan is a civil engineer and social activist known for his significant contributions to the Devendra Kula Velalar community. Born on 5 May 1941 (official records state 13 August 1942) in Sa. Ganapathi Palayam, Gobichettipalayam Taluk, Erode District, Tamil Nadu.

Grandfather: Periyakarupan Pannadi

Father: Guruswami Pannadi

Mother: Veeramaal Pannadichi

Dr. Siddhan has 5 siblings: Two sisters and Two brothers. Kunjaaya, Chinnammani, Karupannan, Marriappan.

Dr. Siddhan's youngest brother, Dr. Marriappan or Dr. Marriappa Mallar is also a tamil research scholar, who has authored various books and has played a pivotal part in the community.

Dr. Siddhan holds a B.E. from the Govt. College of Technology, Coimbatore (1964), an M.Sc. (Engg.) from the College of Engineering, Guindy, Chennai (1968), and a Ph.D. from the University of Connecticut, USA (1976). After two decades of teaching at the Tamilnadu Government College of Engineering, he shifted focus to social work in 1984.

Despite his outstanding qualifications and achievements, he faced discrimination when it came to high-level positions, like being denied the Vice-Chancellor role due to his caste background.

He established the Devendra Forum (1989), Devendra Kula Velalar Sangam (1993), and the Mallar Malar monthly magazine (1995) before founding the Anaithinthiya Thamizhaga Munnetra Kazhagam political party in October 1995. This party aims to unite and promote political awareness among the Mallar, Kudumbar, and Devendra Kula Velalar communities. Through the Tamil Culture and Social Research Forum, he collaborates with historians and archaeologists to explore the Devendra clan's history, including the Chola and Pandyan Movendras.

Dr. Siddhan's publications include Tamil Ilakkiyathil Pallar (Mallar) Devendra Kula Velalar (1993), Thamizhar Panpaattu Varalaaru (three volumes), and numerous research articles on Devendra culture.

He married Annapoorani Siddhan in 1966, and they have two children: G. S Mallika And G. S Senthilkumar. Dr. Siddhan's political presence deteriorated as he aged. He died in March of 2024, succumbing to age related issues.

== Social Reform works ==
Siddhan believed that the real way forward for his community was to break free from these imposed identities and focus on gaining economic and political power. He questioned the continued dependence on government reservations and pushed for self-reliance. Siddhan pointed out that many other groups were benefiting more from the reservation system while his community was still being held back by stigma and discrimination.

== Legacy ==
Gurusamy Siddhan’s message was clear: true progress requires breaking free from the labels and limitations placed by society. He encouraged education, self-empowerment, and standing up against systemic injustice. Through his words and actions, Siddhan inspired others to challenge the status quo and work towards a more equal future for all.
