= K. Krishnasamy =

Indian politician, physician and social worker (born 1952)

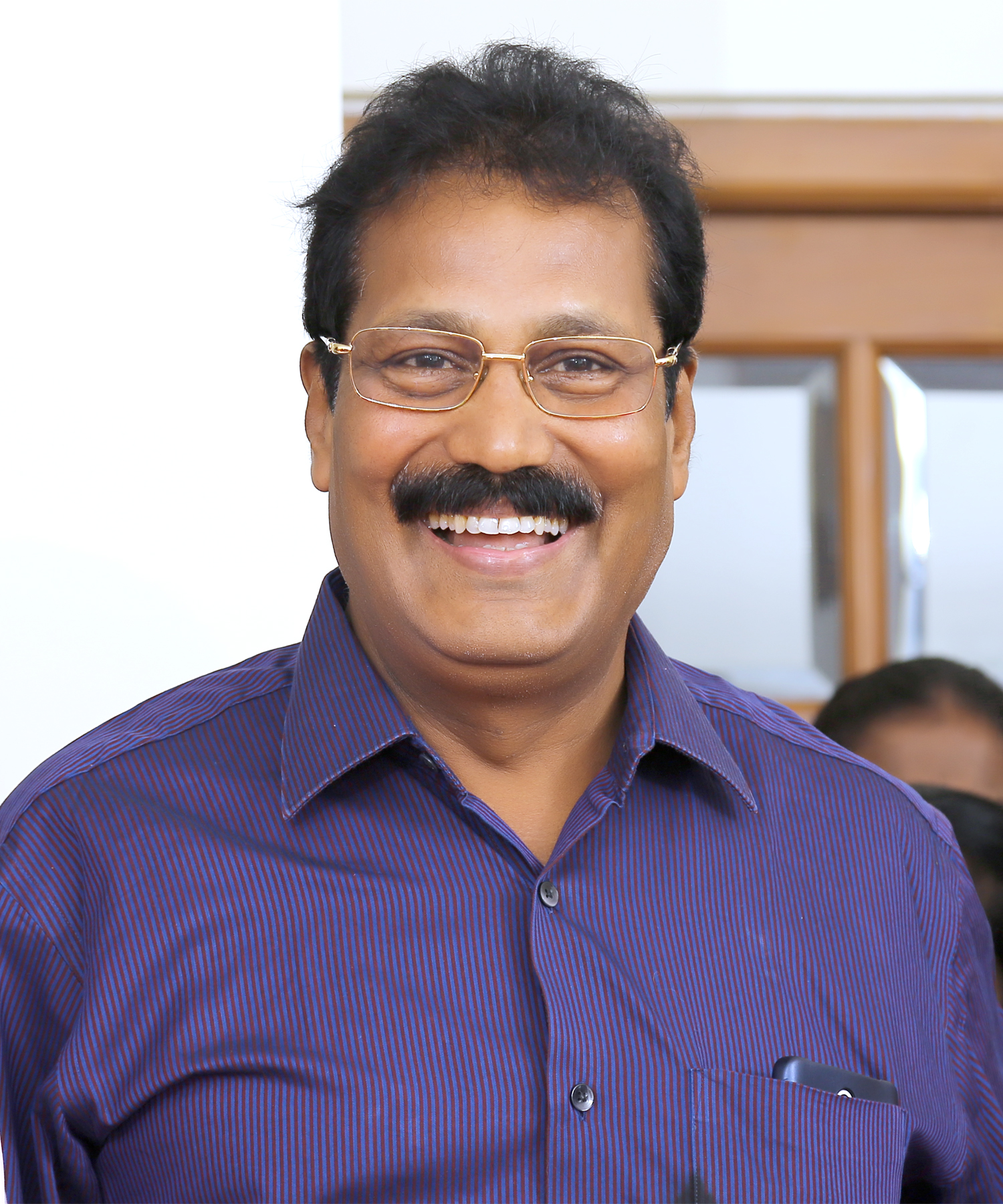
- R.Krishnasamy, former MLA, Puthiya Tamilagam Party founder and president

Former Member of Tamil Nadu Legislative Assembly
- In office 23 May 2011 – 21 May 2016
- Preceded by: P. Mohan
- Succeeded by: R. Sundararaj
- Constituency: Ottapidaram
- In office 10 May 1996 – 14 May 2001
- Preceded by: S. X. Rajamannar
- Succeeded by: A. Sivaperumal
- Constituency: Ottapidaram

Founder & Chairperson of Puthiya Tamilagam Party
- Incumbent
- Assumed office 15 December 1997
- Preceded by: position established

Personal details
- Born: K. Krishnasamy; 3 April 1952 (age 74) Masagoundenpudur, Udumalaipettai; Coimbatore District, Madras State (now in Tiruppur District, Tamil Nadu), India
- Party: Puthiya Tamilagam Party (1997 - Present)
- Spouse: Dr. Chandrika Krishnasamy B.Sc M.B.B.S
- Children: Dr Sangeetha Krishnasamy; Dr Shyam Krishnasamy
- Parent(s): Karuppusamy (father); Thamaraiammal
- Education: School: Government High School, Poolavadi Bachelor of Medicine: Tirunelveli Medical College (1972–75); Madurai Medical College (1975–78) Doctor of Medicine: Coimbatore Medical College (1982–84)
- Occupation: Physician, Politician
- Website: ptparty.org

Karuppusamy Krishnasamy (born 3 April 1952) is an Indian physician, social worker and politician who was a Member of the Legislative Assembly of Tamil Nadu. He founded the Puthiya Tamilagam party in 1999 and was elected to the Tamil Nadu legislative assembly from Ottapidaram constituency in 1996 election and as Puthiya Tamilagam candidate in 2011 Alliance with All India Anna Dravida Munnetra Kazhagam party.

== Political views ==
Krishnasamy on 2019, supported the three language policy in Tamil Nadu and Hindi as a third language for Tamil students. Speaking at a function in Paramakudi in 2019 Krishnasamy said to his party youngsters, "Even if women of a different caste loves you, you should stay away. We have to move forward".

He supported NEET for Tamil Nadu in August 2017 in a demonstration when AIADMK, DMK and many other parties opposed it. Former CPI(M) legislator K. Balabharathi accused him of hypocrisy, recalling that in 2011, the Krishnasamy had thanked then Chief Minister J Jayalalithaa for recommending a medical college seat for his daughter.

Krishnaswamy has supported many policies and positions espoused by the Bharatiya Janata Party (BJP). He has insisted that the Hindu Nationalist Rashtriya Swayamsevak Sangh (RSS) is a nationalist organisation and not a communal organization. He also claimed that there is no evidence the BJP government is trying to impose Hindi across India. His critics alleged that Krishnaswamy is appeasing the BJP and the RSS for personal gain.

== Political career ==
He founded Puthiya Tamilagam, a political party based in Tamil Nadu, India.

The Puthiya Tamilagam contested the 1999 Lok Sabha elections and ten seats in the 2001 state assembly elections, the latter in alliance with the DMK. It won no seats in either case. InIn the 2009 elections to the Lok Sabha, K. Krishnasamy lost to P. Lingam of CPI.

For the 2011 state elections, it allied with the All India Anna Dravida Munnetra Kazhagam party and won two seats: K. Krishnasamy secured 71,330 votes in Ottapidaram constituency and A. Ramaswamy secured 75,124 votes in Nilakkottai constituency.

During the 2014 Lok Sabha elections Puthiya Tamilagam joined with the DMK as part of the Democratic Progressive Alliance. It contested just the Tenkasi constituency, where Krishnasamy lost by 161,774 votes to the AIADMK candidate, M. Vansanthi.

The Puthiya Tamilagam allied with the DMK for the 2016 state assembly elections and contested the seats of Ottapidaram, Srivilliputhur, Krishnarajapuram and Vasudevanallur. Krishnasamy lost to Sundarraj of the AIADMK by 493 votes in Ottapidaram.

In 2019, Lok Sabha election Puthiya Tamilagam party joined the AIADMK-BJP-PMK alliance in Tamil Nadu as part of the National Democratic Alliance. Puthiya Tamilagam was allocated one constituency to contest, with Krishnasamy standing in Tenkasi for the sixth time.

== Elections contested and positions held ==
=== Legislative Assembly Elections ===
Year	Constituency	Party	Votes	%	Opponent	Party	Votes	%	Result	Margin	%
2026	Ottapidaram	PT	15,050	7.67	P. Mathan Raja	TVK	81,625	41.62	Lost	-66,575	-33.95
2021	Ottapidaram	PT	6,544	3.68	M. C. Shunmugaiah	DMK	73,110	41.11	Lost	-66,566	-37.43
2016	Ottapidaram	PT	64,578	40.26	R. Sundararaj	ADMK	65,071	40.57	Lost	-493	-0.31
2011	Ottapidaram	PT	71,330	56.41	Raja. S	DMK	46,204	36.54	Won	+25,126	+19.87
2006	Ottapidaram	BSP	29,271	29.76	P. Mohan	ADMK	38,715	39.36	Lost	-9,444	-9.60
2001	Valparai	PT	29,513	33.11	N. Kovaithangam	TMC	47,428	53.21	Lost	-17,915	-20.10
2001	Ottapidaram	PT	38,699	42.59	A. Sivaperumal	ADMK	39,350	43.30	Lost	-651	-0.71
1996	Ottapidaram	JP	24,585	27.32	S. Paulraj	ADMK	23,437	26.05	Won	+1,148	+1.27

=== Lok Sabha Elections ===
Year	Const.	Party	Votes	%	Opponent	Party	Votes	%	Result	Margin	%
2024	Tenkasi	ADMK	2,29,480	22.08	Rani Srikumar	DMK	4,25,679	40.97	Lost	-1,96,199	-18.89
2019	Tenkasi	ADMK	3,55,389	33.67	Dhanush Kumar	DMK	4,76,156	45.11	Lost	-1,20,767	-11.44
2014	Tenkasi	PT	2,62,812	26.19	M. Vasanthi	ADMK	4,24,586	42.31	Lost	-1,61,774	-16.12
2009	Tenkasi	PT	1,16,685	15.69	P. Lingam	CPI	2,81,174	37.80	Lost	-1,64,489	-22.11
2004	Tenkasi	JD(U)	1,01,122	14.20	M. Appadurai	CPI	3,48,000	48.87	Lost	-2,46,878	-34.67
1999	Tenkasi	PT	1,86,220	27.93	S. Murugesan	ADMK	2,39,241	35.88	Lost	-53,021	-7.95
1998	Tenkasi	PT	1,23,592	19.15	S. Murugesan	ADMK	2,70,053	41.84	Lost	-1,46,461	-22.69
1996	Tirunelveli	JP	61,567	9.50	Sivaprakasam	DMK	2,95,001	45.53	Lost	-2,33,434	-36.03
1984	Pollachi	DMK	2,22,770	40.73	R. Anna Nambi	ADMK	3,24,200	59.27	Lost	-1,01,430	-18.54

== Controversy ==
When Krishnaswamy was asked at a press conference in May 2019 about his stance in the Bhartiya Janata Party's projects, including NEET and hydrocarbon exploration and the explanation for his failure in Tenkasi elections, Krishnaswamy claimed that the journalist who asked the question had further intentions and proceeded on to ask him what caste the journalist belonged to. When asked why the journalist's caste was discussed when he was just doing his job of posing questions, Krishnasamy said, "The reporter kept repeating the same question. What's wrong with asking for one's caste? Is there no caste among all of you? "This led to a heated debate between him and the mediapersons, causing a controversy.
