= Sillanatham =

- Neighbourhood
- Sillanatham, Thoothukudi, Tamil Nadu
- Coordinates: 8.8748°N 78.0702°E
- Country: India
- State: Tamil Nadu
- District: Thoothukudi
- Elevation: 54.05 m (177.3 ft)

Languages
  - Official: Tamil, English
  - Speech: Tamil, English
- Time zone: UTC+5:30 (IST)
- PIN: 628402
- Telephone code: +91461*******
- Other Neighbourhoods: Puthiamputhur, Ottapidaram
- LS: Thoothukudi
- VS: Ottapidaram

Sillanatham is a neighbourhood in Ottapidaram taluk in Thoothukudi district of Tamil Nadu state in the peninsular India.

== Location ==
Sillanatham is located at an altitude of about 54.05 metres (177.3 ft) with the geographic coordinates of (8.8748°N 78.0702°E) in the Thoothukudi district. The Thoothukudi district is southeast of the Tamil Nadu state.

Sillanatham (Tamil Nadu)

== Demographics ==
As of 2011, Sillanatham had a population of 1,594 of which males constituted 795 and females 799, with children representing 10.1% of the population. The literacy rate is 90.39%.

== Industry ==
Sillanatham has an industrial estate of 380 acres owned by SIPCOT (State Industries Promotion Corporation of Tamil Nadu) where the ground breaking ceremony was held on February 25, 2024, for manufacturing electric vehicles and batteries by the Vietnamese electric vehicle manufacturer VinFast and the SIPCOT (joint venture).

== Politics ==
Sillanatham area falls under the Ottapidaram Assembly constituency. Also, this area belongs to Thoothukkudi Lok Sabha constituency.
