= P. Mohan (Ottapidaram politician) =

Indian politician

Former Member of Tamil Nadu Legislative Assembly
- In office 13 May 2006 – 15 May 2011
- Preceded by: A. Sivaperumal
- Succeeded by: K. Krishnasamy
- Constituency: Ottapidaram

P. Mohan is an Indian politician and Member of the Legislative Assembly of Tamil Nadu. He was elected to the Tamil Nadu legislative assembly from Ottpidaram constituency as a All India Anna Dravida Munnetra Kazhagam candidate in 2006 election. In 2011, He lost the seat to K. Krishnasamy of Puthiya Tamilagam who won with 71,330 votes (56.41%), defeating S. Raja (Dravida Munnetra Kazhagam, 36.54%). P. Mohan was not the main AIADMK contender listed in results summaries for that year.. In 2019 (by-election) and 2021, P. Mohan contested as the AlADMK candidate from Ottapidaram but lost both times to DMK's M. C. Shunmugaiah.
