= Vadakku Bommaiyapuram =

Vadakku Bommaiyapuram is a small village near Pasuvanthanai in Ottapidaram, a taluk in Tuticorin District, Tamil Nadu, South India.
