= P. Mohan =

P. Mohan may refer to the following politicians from Tamil Nadu, India

- P. Mohan (Madurai politician)
- P. Mohan (Ottapidaram politician)
- P. Mohan (Sankarapuram politician)
- P. Mohan Kandaswamy, from Pongalur
