= Pandavermangalam =

Coordinates: 9.15376°N 77.88133°E

Pandavarmangalam is a special grade Panchayat in Thoothukudi District in the Indian state of Tamil Nadu and belongs to Kovilpatti constituency. It is the second largest panchayat in Kovilpatti Taluk and is situated near the south border of Kovilpatti, on the Kovilpatti-Pasuvanthanai Road.

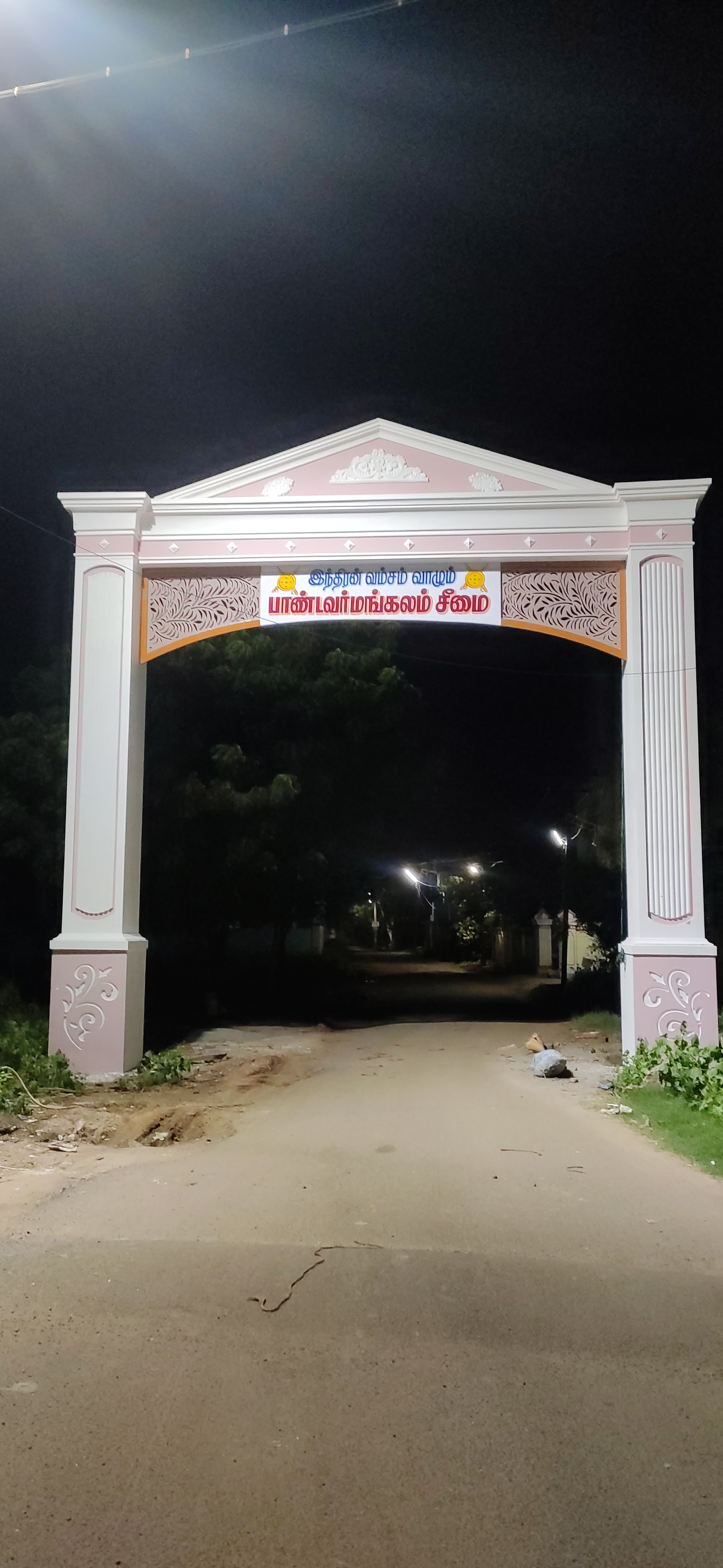
பாண்டவர்மங்கலம் நுழைவாயில்

== History ==
The traditional belief is that during Ramayana era, Rama and his Vanara Sena (monkey warriors) went to Sri Lanka thru this way. And Pandavas who came along with Rama had stayed in this location and hence this village got its Name as Pandavarmangalam. "Pandaver" refers to Pandavas and "Mangalam" means Prosperity. Similarly, The Vanara Sena stayed nearby location and hence the next village got its name as Mandhithopu. "Mandhi" Means Monkey and "Thoppu" Means Farm Trees.

Nonetheless, others states that "Pandi" refers to the rice field where Rice was cultivated. "Avar" refers to people who has and "Mangalam" Refers to Prosperity. Hence Pandavarmangalam refers to The land of people who has Rice Field and Prosperity.

== Sports ==
The Kuppusamy Naidu Memorial Tournament started in Pandavarmangalam at 1945 was conducted every year and it was the second oldest hockey tournament in India. It happens every year for around 15 days and hockey teams from all over India participate in this tournament. This tournament was conducted in Hockey Ground next to Nadar High School in Pandavarmangalam Panchayat, which was discontinued in this ground due to land dispute.

== Development and growth ==
Pandavarmangalam is famous for match works (Safety Matches) and fireworks. Also this is famous for Kali Amman Koil. The Kali Amman Kovil and the Tank was situated in the middle of Pandavarmangalam to have two sections - East and West divisions. The Name of the Tank is as "Neeraavi". The Banyan Tree in the bank (Karai) of Lake Kanmai is very old and rooted or grown broadly.
