= Melaseithalai =

- village
- Location in Tamil Nadu, India Melaseithalai (India)
- Coordinates: 8.981575°N 78.0773°E
- Country: India
- State: Tamil Nadu
- District: Thoothukudi

Languages
  - Official: Tamil
- Time zone: UTC+5:30 (IST)
- PIN: 628722
- Vehicle registration: TN 69

Melaseithalai is a village in Ottapidaram taluk of Thoothukudi District, Tamil Nadu, India. The village comes under Vilathikulam (state assembly constituency) and Thoothukudi (Lok Sabha constituency).

== Geography and location ==
Melaseithalai is located 25 km away from the district headquarters on the National Highway 45B. The village comes under the administrative control of Jegaveerapandiyapuram panchayat, Ottapidaram taluk, Thoothukudi district, Tamil Nadu, India.

== Basic amenities ==
The village has a branch office (B.O.) of India Post. The village also has a Sub-Primary Health Centre functioning under Eppodum vendran Primary Health Centre (PHC)

== Education ==
1. TDTA Primary School - also situated in the village with the total student strength of 54.

== Religious Temples/Church ==
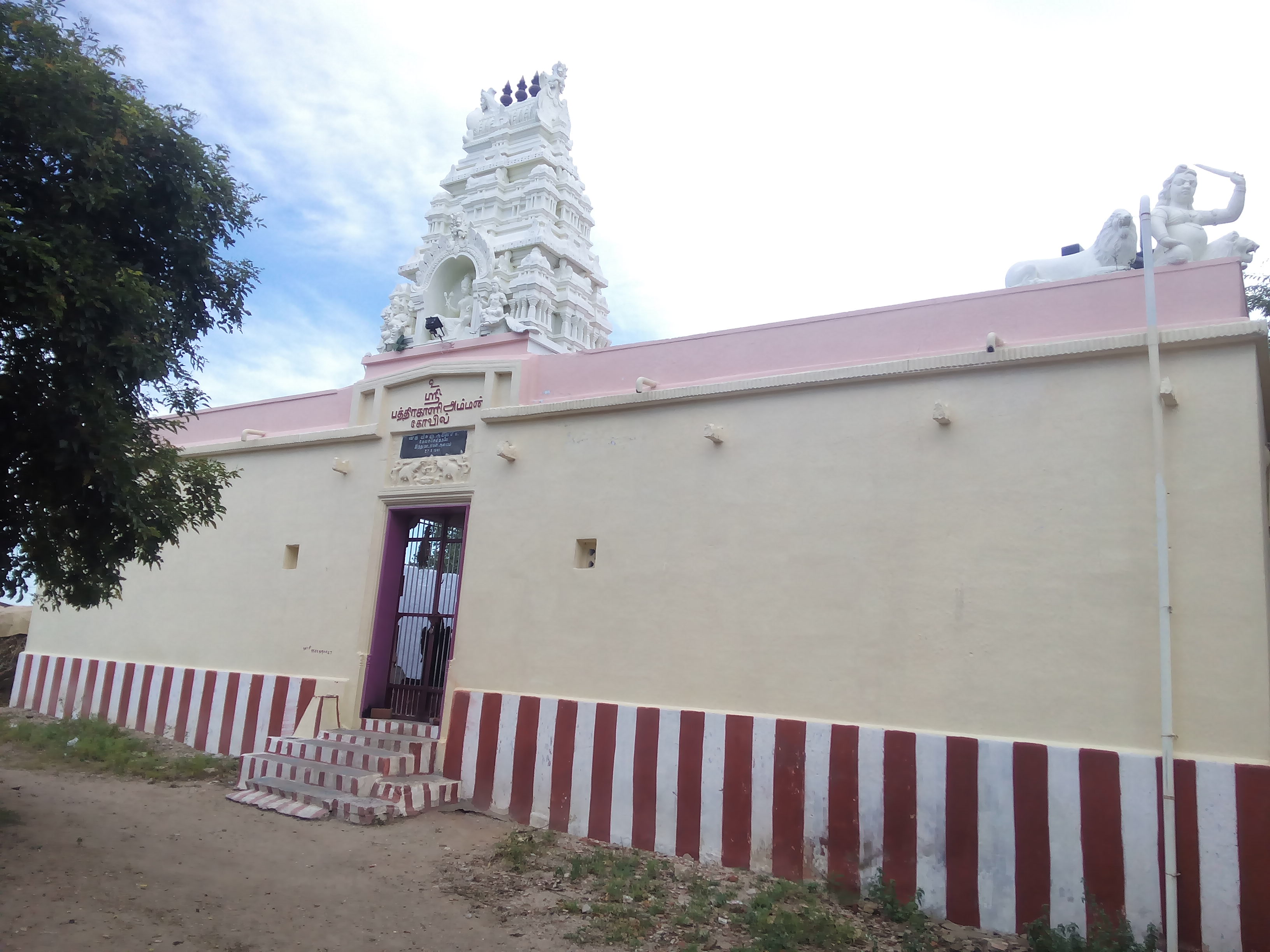
A view of Pathrakali amman temple, Melaseithalai

1. Sri Pathrakali Amman Temple is located in the northern side of the village constructed in the year 1941. Temple festival is celebrated in the month of July every year.
2. Ayyanar & Vinayagar temple is located in west and south side of the village, respectively. Temple festival is celebrated in the month of August, every year (Last Friday of Tamil month AADI).
3. Church of South India - St. Mary Church is also located in the village which is managed by Melaseithalai Pastorate of Thoothukudi - Nazareth Diocese.
