= Pathrakaliamman Temple =

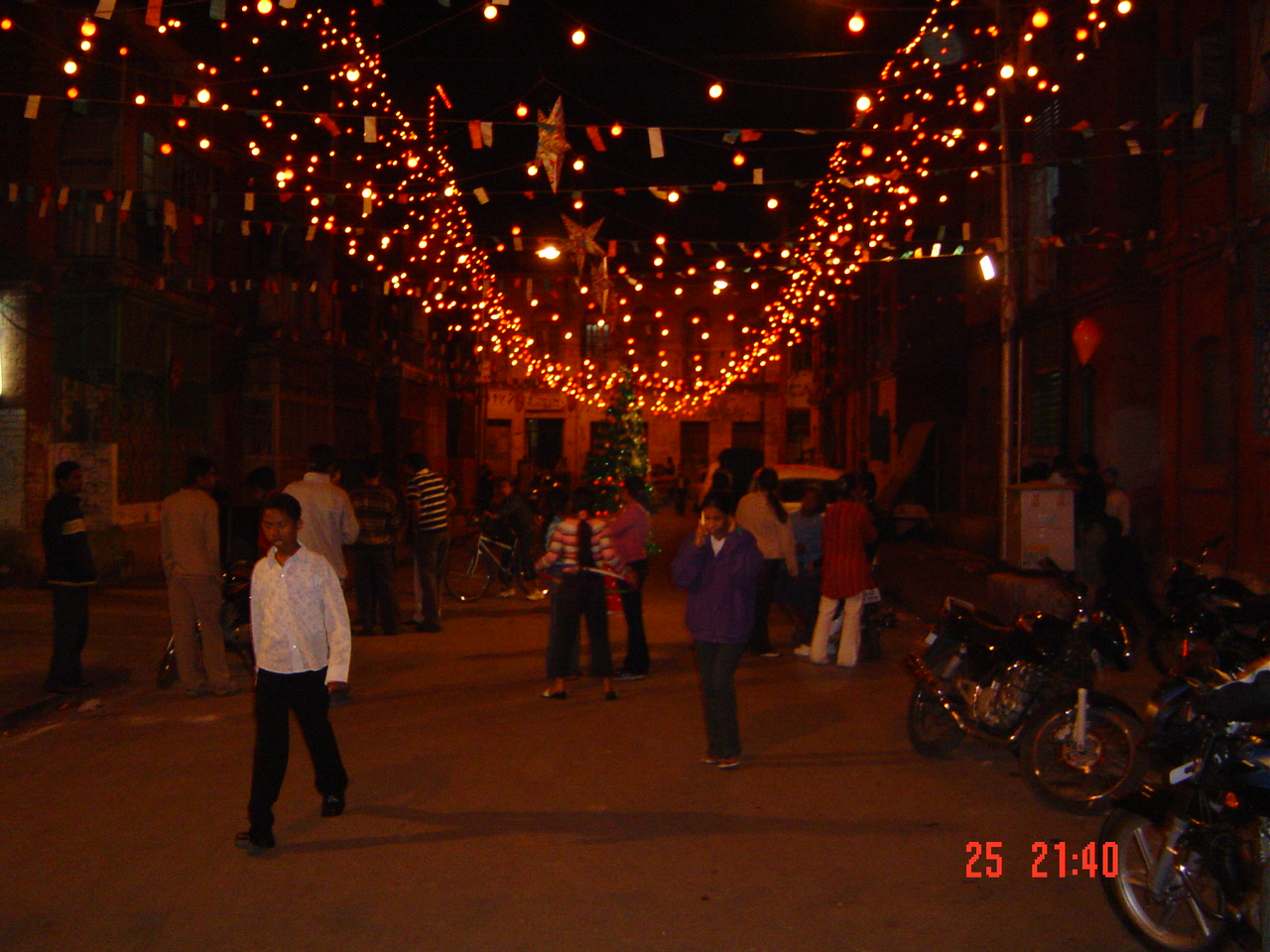

Religion
- Affiliation: Hinduism
- District: Tuticorin
- Deity: Pathirakali amman Thiyal nayagi
- Festivals: Aani festival & masi festival

Location
- Location: Puthiamputhur
- State: Tamil Nadu
- Country: India
- Interactive map of Pathrakaliamman Temple
- Coordinates: 22°31′12″N 88°20′31″E

Architecture
- Type: Tamil Nadu architecture
- Creator: Nadar Community
- Completed: 1855

Arulmiku Sri Pathirakaliamman temple is one of the antique temples in Tamil Nadu. It is in Puthiamputhur, Tuticorin district. The temple is very familiar to the peoples of the district. We could not able to find out the age of the temple exactly still now. But definitely, we can say that the temple is above 150 years old. The temple is having a specific divine power. So the peoples are congregating and they believe the power of the god in the temple. Before the raising of the temple, the village was with minimum number of families. After the raising of the Pathirakaliamman temple, many families were arriving to live here. Step by step some parallel growth is between the temple and village still now.

== History ==
The Pathrakaliamman temple was reconstructed in 1907. That was a milestone of the village, because that time was not easy to build a temple by a community. After 1907 the Puthiampthur also went to next level development in agriculture. Daily workers made as Nilaswathangal.

The temple was reconstructed again in 1977. Ready-made garments industry was entered after 1977 in Puthiamputhur. Ready made garments industry was made as an alternative industry against agriculture. So the industry was provided employment to the village peoples in Puthiamputhur.

In 2004, finally the temple reconstructed. The temple was opened on 1 February 2004. Its height is 61 feet. Around 80 laks rupees spent to build the Pathrakaliamman temple by Nadar community. It was being a biggest celebration in Puthiamputhur. Now the temple is one of the biggest temples in Tuticorin district.

== Gods of the temple ==
1. Arulmigu Sri Pathirakali Amman
2. Ayiram Kan Udaiyal
3. Uchi mahali Amman
4. Santhana Mari Amman
5. Ramar Swamy
6. Biravar
7. Peachi Amman
8. Sudalai madan Swamy
9. Karuppa Swamy
10. Sangili madan Swamy
11. Porthadi madan Swamy
12. Kanni
13. Sri Selva Vinayagar is in a separate temple out of the Pathrakaliamman temple.

== Festivals ==
Three grand festivals are celebrating in this temple.

- Aani festival (Amman Kodai Thiruvizha)
- Masi festival (Thirumal Poojai or Garland devotion festival)
- Ablution for the year (Varushabishagam)

And other regular festivals are all celebrating in the temple.

=== Aani festival ===
The Aani festival is celebration is calculating by Tamil month calendar methods. (Aani is the sixth month of Tamil calendar). If the Aani month has five Tuesdays, the festival will be on fifth Tuesday. If Aani month has four Tuesdays, the festival will be on third Tuesday in the month.

Before fourteen days of the festival Tuesday will announce the temple festival/ temple tax, concerts and festival agenda will issued by the community people of Puthiamputhur. The festival tax should pay each and every married couple of community people of Puthiamputhur. Before Tuesday of festival Tuesday morning kappu kattuthal (that means a yellow rope with a small turmeric piece knots on right hand wrist for defense and divinity) and kal nattuthal (a bamboo stands in front of the temple). The kappu person will take abstinence (fast with one time food for lunch only). The fast should take for next seven days (Thursday to next Thursday).

==== Tuesday- ====
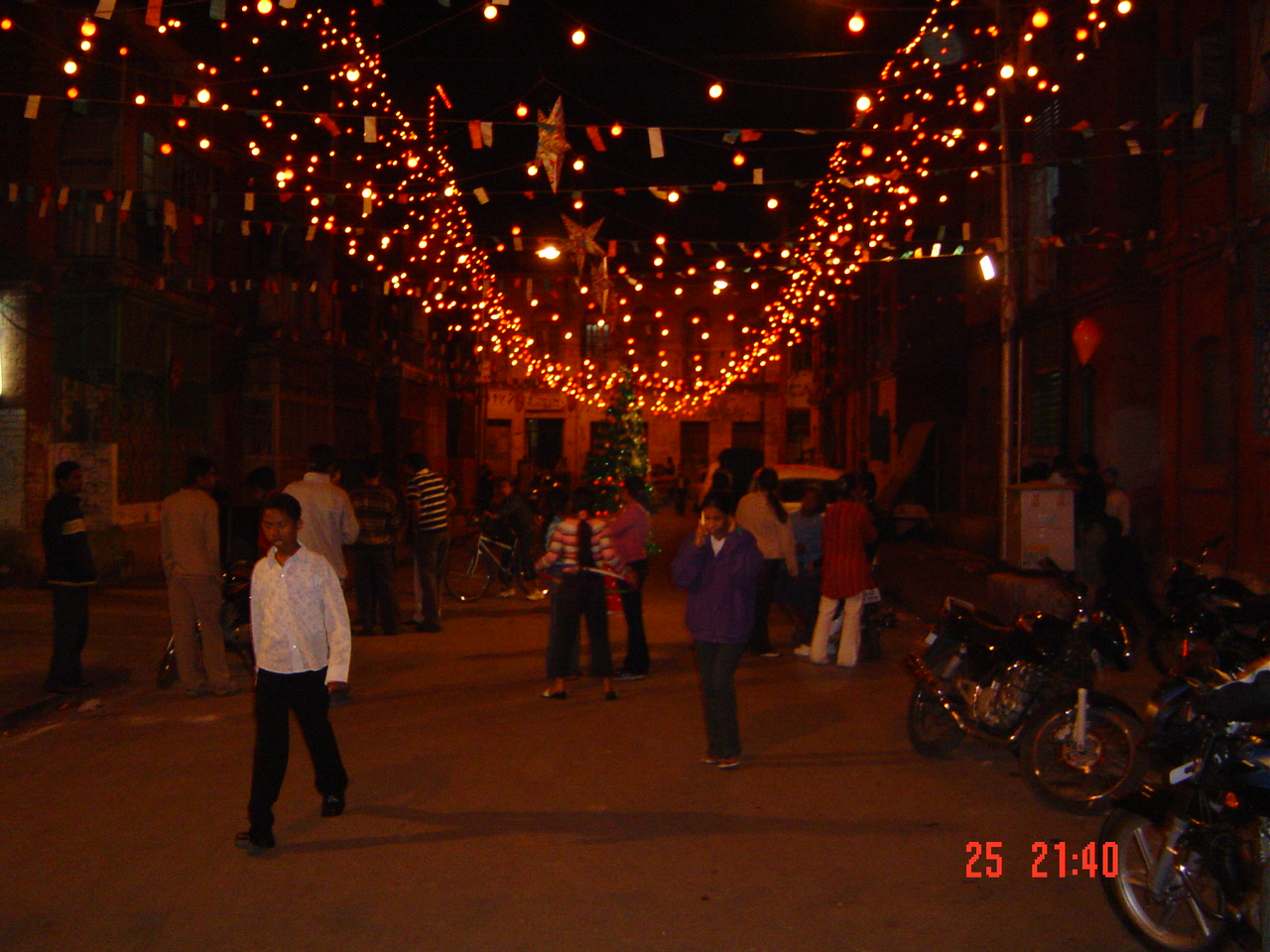
Aani festival season celebration in Puthiamputhur

- Concert of bow (god histories as songs)
- Kaniyam (god's proud & price of gods)
- Milk pot (the milk pots will be taken by the kappu knots persons only allow to take on their head and they will walk around the village of particular area with elephant, chendai melam, milk pot, kottu melam, thappu melam followed one by one and public crowds can follow them. Finally the milk pot can come to temple and the milks of milk pot will use for ablution of gods statues).
- The devotion is to be with decoration of god's statue. The devotion is water, rose, cocoanuts water, fruit mix and embellished by kungumam, sandal flour, smiled cents and others, dressings, festoon etc.
- Water for ablution & worship will take from nanthevanam. It is in out of Puthamputhur. The water is taken by some priest of Devinne power
- karakattam
- Flour light (the light will make by green rice flour)
- 12:00 o'clock devotion will start sharply.
- After the devotion, divine power priest will go to hounding for out of the area. The hounding may be a human or not. But no one could not to find the truth of hunting. It is a belief of the people.

==== Wednesday ====
- Morning free Tiffin will supply for peoples.

The next day of Tuesday, peoples will start make Pongal in temple. After event sheep and goats will arrive to immolate for god. Before the immolation the coats are dashing one and other in the competition inside of the temple. The competition's final winning goat celebrates on have peoples shoulders. The winner is determined by which goat more wins and when other goats fear to dash against the goat, the no1 place goes for the goat. The sheep and goats will immolate in front of god's idol. It is two types are there. 1.cutting on head of goat by long sharp instrument 2.Punching on neck of sheep by a sharp knife Head cutting goats will immolate on front of Pathrakaliamman idol and the neck punching sheep will immolate on sudalai mada swamy idol. After the event, biggest devotion will start among died sheep and goats body with blood in the temple. Finally the 7 days kappu person's awed fast will be end on end of the devotion. Peoples also will have to end the awed abstinence in Puthiamputhur. The temple will close after the event. Next 8th day will open again and cleaned for devotion in the temple. Up to open the temple every night of the 8 days will conduct concerts in Puthiamputhur.

- Afternoon lunch also will provide for peoples as free.

=== Masi festival ===
Above the Aani festival date fixing methods are using for the masi festival. But the month is changed that is masi (it is the 2nd month of Tamil calendar. The masi festival also will start with 3rd or 5th Tuesday of the masi month. The festival's major event is devotion of garland for gods with peoples.

==== Tuesday ====
- Concert of bow (god histories as songs)
- Kaniyam (god's proud & price of goods)
- Milk pot (the milk pots will be taken by the kappu knots persons only allow to take on their head and they will walk around the village of particular area with elephant, chendai melam, milk pot, kottu melam, thappu melam followed one by one and public crowds can follow them. Finally the milk pot can come to temple and the milks of milk pot will used for ablution of gods' statues).
- The devotion is to be with decoration of god's statue. The devotion is water, rose, coconuts water, fruit mix and embellished by kungumam, sandal flour, smiled cents and others, dressings, festoon etc.
- Water for ablution & worship will take from Nanthevanam. It is in out of Puthamputhur. The water is taken by some priest of divine power
- Karakattam
- 12.00A.M will start the devotion sharply.
- After the devotion, chappara pavani will start from the temple with crowds with grand sky crackers. It will go for front of each and every people's home in the community people of Puthiamputhur. They will do pooja with their family members there. Finally it will reach to temple. The end of the event may be at 6.00 am or 7.00 am.

==== Wednesday ====
- The next day of Tuesday, peoples will start to make Pongal by the village people in the temple.
- After the event will conduct big devotion among the peoples crowd in the temple.
- Afternoon lunch also will provide for peoples as free.
- Night of the day will play concert in front of the temple.

=== Ablution for the year ===
The ablution of the year is celebrating yearly once in the temple. The devotion will be continuous morning to afternoon. In front of idols of the temple, ablution priest will start incantation with fire by some woods and sticks of natural Ayurveda trees. The fire will spark on into squire design by some numbers of bricks. The priest will be incantation with some different language. Coins also will through into the fires on the gap of incantation. After the incantation, ablution on top of the temple will conduct there. The ablution special water will spread among the crowds. After that the ablution will start with idols of temple one by one these like water, coconut water, rose water, cured, milk, fruit juice, sandal, dates, turmeric water, honey, flowers and em-placing by sandal, flour, kunkumam, silk saris, jewelries like gold and silver, garlands etc. Finally godly devotion and people's worship will be among the people on long time with sounds of bells and drums. The congregation of awe is invoking in the devotion then free lunch will provide out of temple by the community peoples.

=== Operating hours ===
- 6:00 am to 9:00 pm
- 5:30 am to 9:00 pm

=== Devotional hours ===
- Morning 6:30 am
- Evening 6:45 pm
- Tuesdays and Fridays will be morning 6:30 am and evening 7:15 pm

=== Vilakku Poojai ===
Every full moon days will conduct 108 lights special pournamipoojai. Monthly once it will start at evening 7:00 o’clock sharply.

=== Amenities of the temple ===
- Milk pot
- Silk sari for gods
- Garlands of lime
- Hair removing
- Oil for lights
- Gold for gods

== Features ==
- Mosque is very short of the temple.
- Cameras are not allowed to take any stills of idols of the temple.
- Only gee lights are allowed to use inside of the temple.
- The temple is in center of the Puthiamputhur.
- This is a Nadar community temple. Although other community peoples can came to worship in festival times.
- Opposite of the temple is a well, in which felled persons were not having small injuries by the incidents still now.
- If anybody died in the area of community people, the temple will be closed in those days.
- All family's hierarchy gods are all in one place "Pathrakaliamman temple".
- The temple's old priest is worshiped by the people now. He is also awed as god more than 100 years. A temple was builds for him by the peoples. The temple is beyond science center in Thirunelveli down.
- No one builds any building higher than temple's building height. Buildings will be at least one foot less than the temple's height in Puthiamputhur.
- Pregnant ladies will not come to the temple.

== Organizations ==
=== Arankavalar Kuzhu ===
1. K.R Puthuraja Nadar (leader)
2. K.Raja Nadar
3. P.Tharmaraj Nadar
4. M.P.Soundra Pandi Nadar
5. T.P.Thangaraj Nadar

=== Seyarkuzhu members ===
1. A. Ganeshan MA, M, Phil, M, Ed
2. R.Arumugasamy Nadar
3. POP.Ramasamy Nadar
4. P.K.Jeyabalan Nadar

=== King of Kings Cricket Club ===
1. S.Venil Bharath, BBA (leader)
2. P.Mothilal Mohanraj, BBA, MBA
3. A.Satham Hussain, DEEE
4. R.Thirumani Selvan, DAME
5. R.Ramesh, B.Sc

=== Other groups ===
- King of Kings Cricket Club
- Selva Vinayagar Arts Group
- Readymade Traders Association
- Hindu Nadar Youngster group
- Pathrakaliamman work group

== Programs ==
- 3 July 2013 Wednesday (Aani festival)
- Time: 5:00 am
- Program: special devotion in temple
- Time: 8:00 pm
- program: Ayya Sivachandran special devotional music concert
