= Ottapidaram Assembly constituency =

One of the 234 State Legislative Assembly Constituencies in Tamil Nadu

Coordinates: 8°54′37.00″N 78°00′55.74″E

Ottapidaram
- Constituency No. 217 for the Tamil Nadu Legislative Assembly
- Area of Ottapidaram Assembly constituency

Constituency details
- Country: India
- Region: South India
- State: Tamil Nadu
- District: Thoothukudi
- Lok Sabha constituency: Thoothukkudi
- Established: 1962
- Total electors: 243,756
- Reservation: SC

Member of Legislative Assembly
- 17th Tamil Nadu Legislative Assembly
- Incumbent P. Mathanraja
- Party: TVK
- Alliance: TVK+
- Elected year: 2026

Ottapidaram is one of the 234 state legislative assembly constituencies in Tamil Nadu in southern India. It is also one of the six state legislative assembly constituencies included in Thoothukkudi Lok Sabha constituency. It is one of the oldest assembly segments in Tamil Nadu, having existed since the 1962 election.

== Members of Legislative Assembly ==
Year	Member	Political party
1962	A. L. Ramakrishnan	Indian National Congress
1967	M. Muthiah	Swatantra Party
1971	M. Muthiah	All India Forward Bloc
1977	O. S. Veluchami	Indian National Congress
1980	M. Appadurai	Communist Party of India
1984	R. S. Arumugam	Indian National Congress
1989	M. Muthiah	Dravida Munnetra Kazhagam
1991	S. X. Rajamannar	All India Anna Dravida Munnetra Kazhagam
1996	K. Krishnasamy	Janata Party
2001	A. Sivaperumal	All India Anna Dravida Munnetra Kazhagam
2006	P. Mohan	All India Anna Dravida Munnetra Kazhagam
2011	K. Krishnasamy	Puthiya Tamilagam
2016	R. Sundararaj	All India Anna Dravida Munnetra Kazhagam
2019	M. C. Shunmugaiah	Dravida Munnetra Kazhagam
2021	M. C. Shunmugaiah	Dravida Munnetra Kazhagam
2026	P. Mathan Raja	Tamilaga Vettri Kazhagam

== Election results ==
Vote share of winning candidates
2026	41.62%
2021	41.11%
2019	42.97%
2016	40.57%
2011	56.41%
2006	39.36%
2001	43.30%
1996	27.32%
1991	66.28%
1989	31.69%
1984	67.89%
1980	52.11%
1977	41.51%
1971	56.92%
1967	45.45%
1962	44.17%

=== 2026 ===
2026 Tamil Nadu Legislative Assembly election: Ottapidaram
Party	Candidate	Votes	%	±%
TVK	P. Mathanraja	81,625	41.62	New
DMK	P M Ramajeyam	52,542	26.79	▼14.32
AMMK	R. Sundararaj	25,871	13.19	
NTK	M Anusiya	17,279	8.81	▼3.79
PT	K. Krishnaswamy	15,050	7.67	▲3.99
NOTA	NOTA	879	0.45	
Margin of victory		29,083		
Turnout		1,96,117		
Rejected ballots				
Registered electors		240,988		
gain from		Swing		

=== 2021 ===
2021 Tamil Nadu Legislative Assembly election: Ottapidaram
Party	Candidate	Votes	%	±%
DMK	M. C. Shunmugaiah	73,110	41.11	▼1.86
AIADMK	P. Mohan	64,600	36.32	▲4.88
NTK	M. Vaikundamari	22,413	12.60	▲7.51
PT	K. Krishnasamy	6,544	3.68	New
DMDK	S. Arumuganainar	5,327	3.00	New
IJK	R. Arunadevi	1,913	1.08	New
None of the Above	None of the Above	1,568	0.88	▼0.17
Majority		8,510	4.79	▼6.74
Turnout		177,840	70.68	▼1.99
DMK hold		Swing	▼1.86	

=== 2019 by-election ===
2019 Tamil Nadu Legislative Assembly by-election: Ottapidaram
Party	Candidate	Votes	%	±%
DMK	M. C. Shunmugaiah	73,241	42.97	New
AIADMK	P. Mohan	53,584	31.44	▼9.13
AMMK	R. Sundararaj	29,228	17.15	New
NTK	M. Akalya	8,666	5.09	▲2.73
None of the Above	None of the Above	1,783	1.05	▼0.58
Majority		19,657	11.53	▲11.22
Turnout		170,519	72.67	▲0.01
DMK gain from AIADMK		Swing	New	

=== 2016 ===
2016 Tamil Nadu Legislative Assembly election: Ottapidaram
Party	Candidate	Votes	%	±%
AIADMK	R. Sundararaj	65,071	40.57	New
PT	K. Krishnasamy	64,578	40.26	▼16.15
DMDK	S. Arumuganainar	14,127	8.81	New
BJP	A. Santhanakumar	5,931	3.70	▲1.63
NTK	T. Muthukrishnan	3,792	2.36	New
None of the Above	None of the Above	2,612	1.63	New
Majority		493	0.31	▼19.56
Turnout		160,395	72.66	▼2.82
AIADMK gain from PT		Swing	New	

=== 2011 ===
2011 Tamil Nadu Legislative Assembly election: Ottapidaram
Party	Candidate	Votes	%	±%
PT	K. Krishnasamy	71,330	56.41	New
DMK	S. Raja	46,204	36.54	▲12.79
BJP	A. Muthupalavesam	2,614	2.07	▲1.09
BSP	D. Chandra	785	0.62	▼29.14
Majority		25,126	19.87	▲10.27
Turnout		126,453	75.48	▲7.38
PT gain from AIADMK		Swing	New	

=== 2006 ===
2006 Tamil Nadu Legislative Assembly election: Ottapidaram
Party	Candidate	Votes	%	±%
AIADMK	P. Mohan	38,715	39.36	▼3.94
BSP	K. Krishnasamy	29,271	29.76	New
DMK	S. X. Rajamannar	23,356	23.75	New
DMDK	K. Mohanraj	2,690	2.74	New
AIFB	V. Kothandaraman	1,448	1.48	New
BJP	A. Santhanakumar	963	0.98	New
Majority		9,444	9.60	▲8.88
Turnout		98,449	68.10	▲4.67
AIADMK hold		Swing	▼3.94	

=== 2001 ===
2001 Tamil Nadu Legislative Assembly election: Ottapidaram
Party	Candidate	Votes	%	±%
AIADMK	A. Sivaperumal	39,350	43.30	▲17.25
PT	K. Krishnasamy	38,699	42.59	New
MDMK	R. Gurusamy Krishnan	8,451	9.30	▼6.79
Majority		651	0.72	▼0.56
Turnout		90,875	63.43	▼4.04
AIADMK gain from JP		Swing	▲17.25	

=== 1996 ===
1996 Tamil Nadu Legislative Assembly election: Ottapidaram
Party	Candidate	Votes	%	±%
JP	K. Krishnasamy	24,585	27.32	New
AIADMK	S. Paulraj	23,437	26.05	▼40.23
DMK	S. Sundaram	22,679	25.21	▼6.48
MDMK	A. S. Ganesan	14,480	16.09	New
AIIC(T)	A. D. Alexander	1,029	1.14	New
BJP	S. Jeyarani	727	0.81	New
Majority		1,148	1.28	▼33.31
Turnout		93,557	67.47	▲8.33
JP gain from AIADMK		Swing	New	

=== 1991 ===
1991 Tamil Nadu Legislative Assembly election: Ottapidaram
Party	Candidate	Votes	%	±%
AIADMK	S. X. Rajamannar	52,360	66.28	▲43.25
DMK	C. Chelladurai	25,035	31.69	0.00
PMK	S. Jeevarathinam	1,184	1.50	New
Majority		27,325	34.59	▲32.42
Turnout		80,837	59.14	▼7.99
AIADMK gain from DMK		Swing	▲43.25	

=== 1989 ===
1989 Tamil Nadu Legislative Assembly election: Ottapidaram
Party	Candidate	Votes	%	±%
DMK	M. Muthiah	25,467	31.69	New
INC	O. S. Veluchami	23,724	29.52	▼38.37
AIADMK	V. Gopalakrishnan	18,507	23.03	New
Majority		1,743	2.17	▼35.05
Turnout		82,522	67.13	▲0.32
DMK gain from INC		Swing	New	

=== 1984 ===
1984 Tamil Nadu Legislative Assembly election: Ottapidaram
Party	Candidate	Votes	%	±%
INC	R. S. Arumugam	46,190	67.89	New
CPI	M. Appadurai	20,868	30.67	New
Majority		25,322	37.22	▲33.00
Turnout		74,147	66.81	▲7.74
INC gain from CPI		Swing	New	

=== 1980 ===
1980 Tamil Nadu Legislative Assembly election: Ottapidaram
Party	Candidate	Votes	%	±%
CPI	M. Appadurai	33,071	52.11	New
INC(I)	O. S. Veluchami	30,393	47.89	New
Majority		2,678	4.22	▼6.47
Turnout		64,720	59.07	▲6.52
CPI gain from INC		Swing	New	

=== 1977 ===
1977 Tamil Nadu Legislative Assembly election: Ottapidaram
Party	Candidate	Votes	%	±%
INC	O. S. Veluchami	22,629	41.51	New
AIADMK	O. Thangaraj	16,801	30.82	New
JP	S. Ashok Kumar	7,483	13.73	New
DMK	U. Mookiah	4,661	8.55	New
Majority		5,828	10.69	▼9.35
Turnout		55,355	52.55	▼7.53
INC gain from AIFB		Swing	New	

=== 1971 ===
1971 Tamil Nadu Legislative Assembly election: Ottapidaram
Party	Candidate	Votes	%	±%
AIFB	M. Muthiah	27,571	56.92	New
SWA	K. Manoharan	17,861	36.87	▼8.58
Majority		9,710	20.04	▲11.06
Turnout		53,556	60.80	▼9.53
AIFB gain from SWA		Swing	New	

=== 1967 ===
1967 Madras Legislative Assembly election: Ottapidaram
Party	Candidate	Votes	%	±%
SWA	M. Muthiah	25,937	45.45	▲1.28
INC	S. Dhanushkodi	20,814	36.47	▲7.23
Majority		5,123	8.98	▼5.95
Turnout		59,955	70.33	▲0.01
SWA gain from INC		Swing	▲1.28	

=== 1962 ===
1962 Madras Legislative Assembly election: Ottapidaram
Party	Candidate	Votes	%	±%
INC	A. L. Ramakrishnan	30,067	44.17	New
SWA	K. Vaiyappan	19,906	29.24	New
CPI	S. Nagu	18,103	26.59	New
Majority		10,161	14.93	New
Turnout		70,798	70.32	New
INC win (new seat)				
