= Puthiamputhur =

Puthiamputhur Podhi Amathoor
- Town
- Nickname: Readymade City
- Country: India
- State: Tamil Nadu
- District: Thoothukudi district

Government
  - Type: Panchayat
  - Body: Ottapidaram taluk

Population (2011)
  - Total: 8,012

Languages
  - Official: Tamil
- Time zone: UTC+5:30 (IST)
- Postal code: 628 402
- Telephone code: 91- 461
- Vehicle registration: TN 69
- Website: http://www.puthiamputhur.com/

Puthiamputhur is a town in Ottapidaram taluk, Thoothukudi district of the Indian state of Tamil Nadu, located 17 km west of Tuticorin, 4 km south of Ottapidaram, 15 km north of Pudukkottai and 613 km from the State capital Chennai. The Puthiamputhur is known as Thennagathin Tirupur, Kutty Jappan, and Readymade City. Around 5000 families live in this area.

== History ==
=== Before 1950s ===
Puthiamputhur was originally called Pothiamathur (Pothi meaning "load" + Amathur meaning "resting area"). Before 1950, there were no buses for travel, so people used donkeys and cows for trade and personal journeys. It was an intersection roadway of the Thoothukudi-Maniyachi and Pudukottai-Ottapidaram routes, making it an ideal place for travelers and walkers to take rest during long journeys. This is why the village was called Pothiamathur. Over time, the name evolved step by step to Pothimuthoor, and eventually, it became known as Puthiamputhur (as per government records, "Pudiyamputhur"). However, North Indians often refer to it as "Puthimbatore," likely due to their pronunciation.

=== After 1950s ===
The area was known for its guava (koyya) fruit. The fruits were produced in large quantities and had a strong reputation across the southern districts under the name "Puthiamputhur Koyya." The soil was considered particularly suited for producing guava with a distinctive taste. Two varieties were cultivated: red guava and white guava (Seeni guava). The white guava was notably large in size.

=== 1950s ===
One of the notable features of the village is the Weekly Goat Market, one of the oldest weekly goat markets in the district. This market operates every Wednesday and requires a token purchase for entry. In the 1950s, the market was a special location for purchasing a variety of items, including goats, cows, chickens, pots, iron materials, fruits, clothing, sarees, and domestic products. The market was located at the center point of the village, and it was connected to all the main roads to Thoothukudi, Pudukottai via Thattaparai, Ottapidaram, Maniyacchi, and Puthurpandiapuram. This place was easier to access and an ideal location for all nearby villages within a 20-kilometer radius. People across the Tuticorin district would use the market to buy and sell household items at low prices. Now, the Weekly Market is primarily used for trading goats.

=== 1970s ===
The 1970s were a peak period for flower cultivation in the area, particularly samanki, pichi, and malli. Samanki flower oil was extracted and packed in tin bottles, which were exported from Puthiamputhur. Flower market prices in the Tuticorin District were largely determined by Puthiamputhur traders. Flower cultivation later declined due to factors including climate change and seasonal rain failures.

=== Readymade manufacturing ===
In 1954, Alagusundaram pioneered readymade garment manufacturing in Puthiamputhur. He began by establishing a garment factory on a small scale, initially employing only four tailors. The success of this venture encouraged him to expand his business, marking the beginning of the cloth manufacturing industry in this area. Subsequently, his brothers, Durai Raja and Maharaja, joined Alagusundaram's business, working alongside him. Their collective efforts yielded substantial profits. This success spurred the growth of the industry, leading to many new entrepreneurs entering the readymade manufacturing business, including Pichiah and Thangalingam. The factory's main products included items such as underwear, petticoats, trousers, tap trousers, jippa shirts, umbrella skirts, and blouses. Regular garments were manufactured locally and traded throughout Tamil Nadu.

=== After 1984 ===
Around 27 garment factories were operating in Puthiamputhur by 1984. They purchased their raw material mainly from Madurai and Chennai, and sold their goods across South Tamil Nadu. Puthiamputhur readymade garments became known for their quality and low prices, and the local population increasingly depended on the garment industry for their livelihood, whether as workers or traders.

=== 2000 to 2010s ===
Around 200 small-scale factories were established in Puthiamputhur between 2000 and 2004. These garment factories sold their products throughout Tamil Nadu. This represented a period of significant growth for the industry, attracting more entrepreneurs to the area.

=== 2005 to 2006 ===
The clothing manufacturing industry in Puthiamputhur faced a crisis during 2005–2006. Around 60 companies closed during this period. The remaining companies faced problems including manpower shortages, heavy market competition, price negotiation difficulties, compromises on quality, high production volumes relative to sales, declining buying capacity, and irregular payment cycles from buyers.

=== Present ===
Around 10,000 people are employed in the Puthiamputhur garments industry. Over 250 companies are reportedly active. Products are sold across Tamil Nadu, Pondicherry, Kerala, Andhra Pradesh, and Karnataka. Puthiamputhur is said to supply approximately 40% of readymade garments in Tamil Nadu.

== Overview ==
Above 250 ready-made garments private companies, 3 Elementary schools, 2 higher secondary schools, 3 children's schools, 1 Government hospital, and 5 Private hospitals and Medicals. police station, Panchayat office, Union office. Government library. Lodge, Cinema theater, Petrol bunks, Government technical training centre, 3 Churches and lot of Hindu temples, Islam masuthi, Rice mills, Power plant, private banks, society bank, TMB BANK ATM and AXIS BANK ATM centres, 2 financial institutions, 3 government ration stores, government tax centre, government health centre, Government wastage utilizing centre, Typewriting centre, around 20 Women's self associations, jewellery shops etc.

== Religion ==
- Pathrakaliamman Temple
- C.S.I St. John The Baptist Church

== Transportation ==
Puthiamputhur to chennai transportation facility is available. This town is well connected to Kovilpatti, Ottapidaram & Thoothukudi and direct transportation speciality to Madurai, Tirunelveli, Eral, Tiruchendur & etc..

== How to Reach ==
Below Listed the Railway stations to reach Puthiyamputhur

- Kailasapuram Railway Station (8Km)
- Tattapparai Railway Station (4Km)
- Tuticorin Railway Station (17Km)
