= O. S. Veluchami =

Indian politician

O. S. Veluchami (died 19 August 2020) was an Indian politician and former Member of the Legislative Assembly. He was elected to the Tamil Nadu legislative assembly as an Indian National Congress candidate from Ottapidaram constituency in 1977 election.

Veluchami died on 19 August 2020.
