= Puthiya Tamilagam =

Indian political party

- Abbreviation: PT
- General Secretary: K. Krishnasamy
- Founder: K. Krishnasamy
- Founded: 15 December 1997; 28 years ago
- Headquarters: Pothigai Illam, 1/2A, VGM Street, Nungambakkam, Chennai – 600034, Tamil Nadu, India.
- Student wing: PT Students' Wing
- Youth wing: PT Youth Wing
- Women's wing: PT Women's Wing
- Ideology: Nationalism; Social equity
- Political position: Centre-right
- Colours: Red; Green
- ECI status: Unrecognised party
- Alliance: AIADMK-led Alliance (2011-2014) (2019-2021) (2024); DMK-led Alliance (2001-2004) (2014-2019); NDA (2001-2004) (2019-2021); UPA (2016); JD(U)+ (2004); Tamil Maanila Congress (1999); BSP+ (2006); Manithaneya Makkal Katchi (2009)
- Seats in Rajya Sabha: 0 / 245
- Seats in Lok Sabha: 0 / 543
- Seats in Tamil Nadu Legislative Assembly: 0 / 234
- Number of states and union territories in government: 0 / 31

Party flag
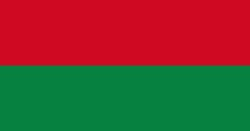

Website
- www.ptparty.org

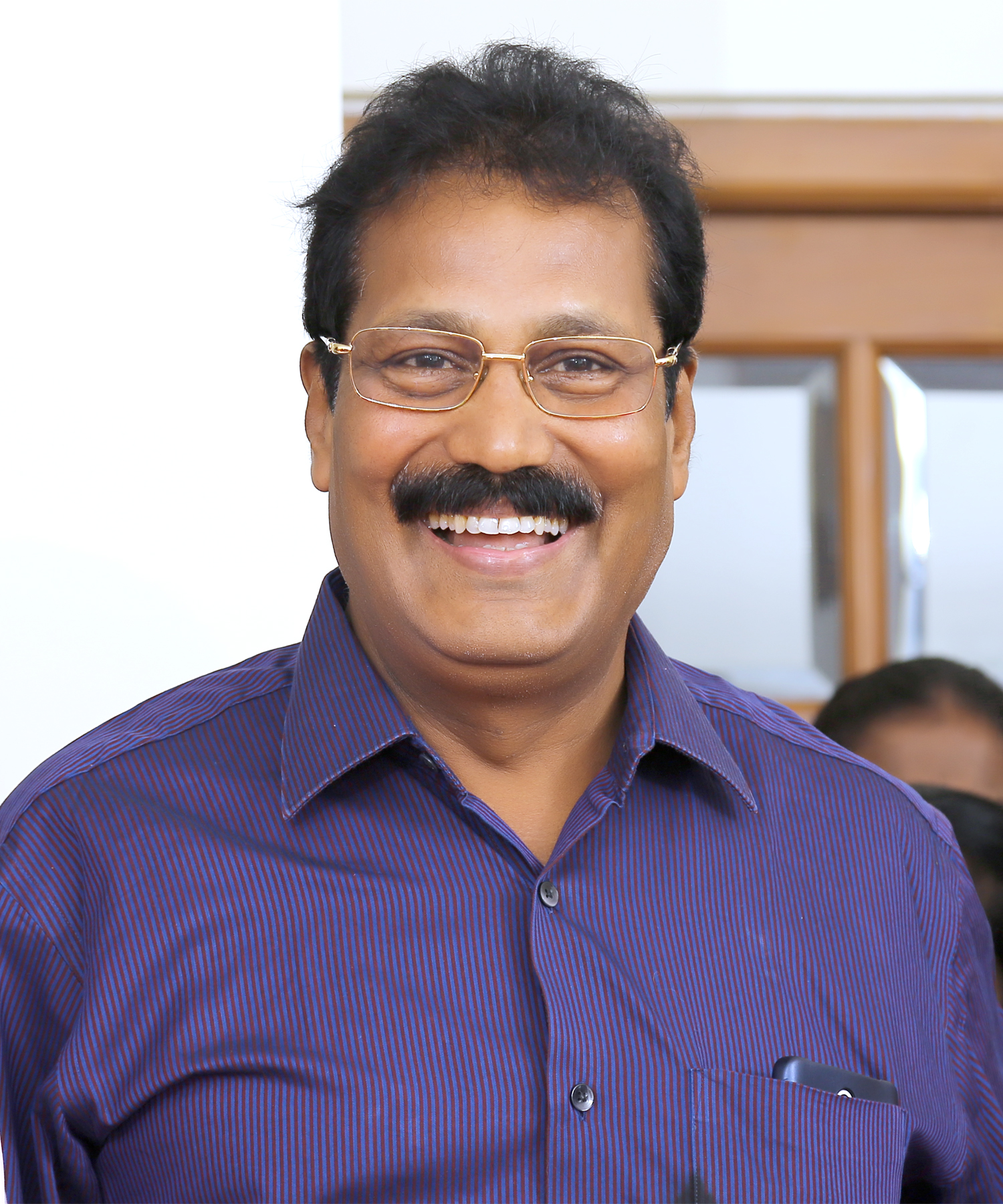
K. Krishnasamy
Founder of the party

The Puthiya Tamilagam (transl. New Tamilagam; abbr. PT) is an Indian regional political party in Tamil Nadu. It was founded by the former member of the Tamil Nadu Legislative Assembly K. Krishnasamy on 15 December 1997.

== Elections ==
=== 1998 Indian General Election ===
Post the formation of the party in the end of 1997, the general assembly of the party decided to contest the 1998 Indian general election without any alliance. The party contested in 15 constituencies in Tamil Nadu, namely: Tenkasi, Tirunelveli, Sivakasi, Ramanathapuram, Sivaganga, Periyakulam, Dindigul, Nagapattinam, Mayiladuthurai, Tiruchirappalli, Karur, Pollachi, Tiruchengode, Rasipuram and Chennai Central constituencies. The party lost in all the constituencies which it contested.

- The party candidates such as K. Krishnasamy and Sathyamoorthy polled more than a 100,000 votes in Tenkasi and Sivakasi constituencies respectively.
- The party also polled more than a 50,000 votes in Ramanathapuram and Tirunelveli constituencies respectively.
- The party polled more than 20,000 votes in Periyakulam and Dindigul constituencies respectively.

=== 1999 Indian General Election ===
The party joined the Tamil Maanila Congress alliance for the 1999 Indian general election. The alliance comprised parties such as Janata Dal, Viduthalai Chiruthaigal Katchi, Indian Union Muslim League and Kamaraj Aadhithanar Kazhagam. The party contested in ten constituencies with the "Bullock Cart" symbol allocated to it. K.Krishnasamy polled 186,220 votes in the Tenkasi constituency. The contest was won by S. Murugesan of AIADMK .

=== 2001 Tamil Nadu Legislative Assembly Election ===
For the 2001 Tamil Nadu Legislative Assembly election, the party joined the Democratic Progressive Alliance comprising Dravida Munnetra Kazhagam, Bharatiya Janata Party, and a few caste based parties. The party contested in 10 seats and was allocated the lock symbol.

=== 2004 Indian General Election ===
For the 2004 Indian general election, the party joined the People's Alliance comprising Viduthalai Chiruthaigal Katchi, Makkal Tamil Desam Katchi, Janata Dal (United), Indian National League and Puratchi Council. The party was allocated two seats to contest in "Arrow" symbol. Party President K. Krishnasamy polled 101,122 votes in the Tenkasi constituency and Dheepa Valentina polled 27,130 votes in the Sivakasi constituency.

=== 2006 Tamil Nadu Legislative Assembly Election ===
The party made an alliance pact with Bahujan Samaj Party and contested 53 seats in "Elephant" symbol. The party also decided to contest in a few unreserved constituencies. K. Krishnasamy polled 29,271 votes in the Ottapidaram constituency. The winning margin between All India Anna Dravida Munnetra Kazhagam and Dravida Munnetra Kazhagam was only 9,444 votes.

=== 2011 Tamil Nadu Legislative Assembly Election ===
For the 2011 state elections, it allied with the All India Anna Dravida Munnetra Kazhagam party and won two seats: President K. Krishnasamy secured 71,330 votes in Ottapidaram constituency and A. Ramaswamy secured 75,124 votes in Nilakkottai constituency.

=== 2014 Indian general election ===
The 2014 Lok Sabha elections, the party aligned with the Dravida Munnetra Kazhagam as part of the Democratic Progressive Alliance. It contested the lone seat of Tenkasi constituency, where K. Krishnasamy lost by 161,774 votes to the All India Anna Dravida Munnetra Kazhagam candidate, M. Vasanthi.

=== 2016 Tamil Nadu Legislative Assembly Election ===
The party allied with the Dravida Munnetra Kazhagam for the 2016 state assembly elections as part of the Democratic Progressive Alliance. The party contested the seats of Ottapidaram, Srivilliputhur, Krishnarayapuram and Vasudevanallur. K. Krishnasamy lost to Sundarraj of the All India Anna Dravida Munnetra Kazhagam by a slender margin of 493 votes in Ottapidaram constituency.

=== 2019 Indian general election ===
For the 2019 Lok Sabha election, the partu joined the AIADMK-BJP-PMK-DMDK alliance in Tamil Nadu as part of the National Democratic Alliance. The party was allocated one constituency to contest. K. Krishnasamy contested in the Tenkasi constituency for the sixth time. He recorded his highest ever votes tallyand eventually lost to Dhanush M. Kumar of the DMK by a margin of 120,767 votes

=== 2021 Tamil Nadu Legislative Assembly Election ===
For the 2011 state elections, the party contested alone in 55 seats in Tamil Nadu. The highest number of votes was 6,544, which was acquired by the K. Krishnasamy in Ottapidaram constituency.

=== 2024 Indian general election ===
For the 2024 Lok Sabha election, Puthiya Tamilagam joined the AIADMK-led Alliance in Tamil Nadu.K. Krishnasamy contested in the Tenkasi constituency for the seventh time.

== Members of Legislative Assembly (Tamil Nadu) ==
No	Year	Election	Member	Constituency
1	2011	14th Assembly	K. Krishnasamy	Ottapidaram
2	2011	14th Assembly	A. Ramasamy	Nilakottai

== List of party leaders ==
=== Presidents ===
No.	Portrait	Name	Term in office		
No.	Portrait	Name	Assumed office	Left office	Time in office
1		K. Krishnasamy (b. 1952)	15 December 1997	Incumbent	28 years, 285 days

== Election history ==
=== Tamil Nadu Legislative Assembly ===
Year	Party leader	Alliance	Seats contested	Seats won	Seats +/-	Vote % (in Tamil Nadu)	Total Votes Polled	Vote swing
1996	Dr.K. Krishnasamy	None	6	1 / 234	▲1	0.33%	89,772	▲0.33
2001	Dr.K. Krishnasamy	DPA	10	0 / 234	▼1	1.27%	355,171	▲0.94
2006	Dr.K. Krishnasamy	None	53	0 / 234	Steady	0.50%	162,029	▼0.77
2011	Dr.K. Krishnasamy	AIADMK+	2	2 / 234	▲2	0.40%	146,454	▼0.37
2016	Dr.K. Krishnasamy	SPA	4	0 / 234	▼2	0.51%	219,830	▲0.11
2021	Dr.K. Krishnasamy	None	55	0 / 234	Steady			
2026	Dr.K. Krishnasamy	None	70	0 / 70	TBD	TBD	TBD	TBD

=== Lok Sabha ===
Year	Lok Sabha	Party leader	Alliance	Seats contested	Seats won	Seats +/-	Vote % (in Tamil Nadu)	Total Votes Polled	Vote swing
1996	11th Lok Sabha	Dr.K. Krishnasamy	None	2	0 / 543	Steady	0.38%	100,994	New
1998	12th Lok Sabha	Dr.K. Krishnasamy	None	15	0 / 543	Steady	1.74%	446,583	▲1.36
1999	13th Lok Sabha	Dr.K. Krishnasamy	TMC Alliance	10	0 / 543	Steady	2.09%	568,196	▲0.35
2004	14th Lok Sabha	Dr.K. Krishnasamy	People's alliance	5	0 / 543	Steady	0.44%	128,252	▼1.65
2009	15th Lok Sabha	Dr.K. Krishnasamy	None	1	0 / 543	Steady	0.38%	116,685	▼0.06
2014	16th Lok Sabha	Dr.K. Krishnasamy	DPA	1	0 / 543	Steady	0.66%	262,812	▲0.28
2019	17th Lok Sabha	Dr.K. Krishnasamy	NDA	1	0 / 543	Steady	0.83%	355,870	▲0.17
2024	18th Lok Sabha	Dr.K. Krishnasamy	AIADMK+	1	0 / 543	Steady	TBD	229,480	TBD

== See also ==
- List of political parties in India
