= S. X. Rajamannar =

Indian politician

S. X. Rajamannar was an Indian politician and former Member of the Legislative Assembly. He was elected to the Tamil Nadu legislative assembly as an Anna Dravida Munnetra Kazhagam candidate from Ottapidaram constituency in 1991 election.

== Electoral performance ==
2021 Tamil Nadu Legislative Assembly election: Poonamallee
Party	Candidate	Votes	%	±%
DMK	A. Krishnaswamy	149,578	57.34%	+18.93
PMK	S. X. Rajamannar	55,468	21.26%	+14.67
NTK	A. Manimekalai	29,871	11.45%	+10.38
MNM	J. Revathi Manimegalai	11,927	4.57%	New
AMMK	T. A. Elumalai	8,805	3.38%	New
BSP	A. C. Sathyamurthy	2,891	1.11%	+0.25
NOTA	NOTA	2,871	1.10%	−0.26
Margin of victory		94,110	36.08%	31.17%
Turnout		260,865	72.89%	−3.12%
Rejected ballots		275	0.11%	
Registered electors		357,874		
DMK gain from AIADMK		Swing	14.02%	

1991 Tamil Nadu Legislative Assembly election: Ottapidaram
Party	Candidate	Votes	%	±%
AIADMK	S. X. Rajamannar	52,360	66.28	▲43.25
DMK	C. Chelladurai	25,035	31.69	0.00
PMK	S. Jeevarathinam	1,184	1.50	New
Majority		27,325	34.59	▲32.42
Turnout		80,837	59.14	▼7.99
AIADMK gain from DMK		Swing	▲43.25	
