= M. Muthiah =

Indian politician

Member of the Tamil Nadu Legislative Assembly
- In office 1967 - 1972; 1971 - 1976; 1989 - 1994
- Constituency: Ottapidaram

Personal details
- Party: Dravida Munnetra Kazhagam

M. Muthiah was an Indian politician and former Member of the Legislative Assembly. He was elected to the Tamil Nadu legislative assembly as Swatantra Party candidate from Ottapidaram constituency in 1967 election, Forward Bloc candidate in 1971 election and as Dravida Munnetra Kazhagam candidate in 1989 election.
