= A. L. Ramakrishna Naicker =

Indian politician

Member of the Madras State Assembly
- In office 1962–1967
- Preceded by: K. Vaiyappan
- Constituency: Ottapidaram

Personal details
- Party: Indian National Congress

A. L. Ramakrishna Naicker was an Indian politician and former Member of the Legislative Assembly. He was elected to the Tamil Nadu legislative assembly as an Indian National Congress candidate from Ottapidaram constituency in 1962 election.
