= M. C. Shunmugaiah =

Indian politician

Member of the Tamil Nadu Legislative Assembly
- In office 23 May 2019 – 4 May 2026
- Preceded by: R. Sundararaj
- Succeeded by: P Mathanraja
- Constituency: Ottapidaram

Personal details
- Party: Dravida Munnetra Kazhagam

M. C. Shunmugaiah is an Indian politician who is a Member of Legislative Assembly of Tamil Nadu. He was elected from Ottapidaram as a Dravida Munnetra Kazhagam candidate in 2019 By-election and 2021.

== Electoral performance ==
Election	Constituency	Party	Result	Vote %	Runner-up	Runner-up Party	Runner-up vote %
2021 Tamil Nadu Legislative Assembly election	Ottapidaram	DMK	Won	41.48%	P. Mohan	ADMK	36.65%
2019 Tamil Nadu Legislative Assembly by-elections	Ottapidaram	DMK	Won	42.97%	P. Mohan	ADMK	31.44%
