= Tharuvaikulam =

- village
- Location in Tamil Nadu, India Tharuvaikulam (India)
- Coordinates: 8.895°N 78.166°E
- Country: India
- State: Tamil Nadu
- District: Thoothukudi

Population (2001)
  - Total: 6,178
  - Density: 16.75/km^{2} (43.4/sq mi)

Languages
  - Official: Tamil
- Time zone: UTC+5:30 (IST)
- PIN: 628105
- Telephone code: 91 461
- Vehicle registration: TN 69

Tharuvaikulam is a village in Thoothukudi District of Tamil Nadu in southern India. There are about 3,000, mostly Catholic, families living there. It falls under the Roman Catholic diocese of Thoothukudi and the feast of St.Michael is a popular religious festival.

== Geography ==
Tharuvaikulam is located 10 km from Thoothukudi near the Bay of Bengal in Tamil Nadu.

== History ==
Catholic settlement is believed to have started as early as 1750. At that time the village was located in Kaamanaikanpatti Parish and then in Vembar. In 1907 the present Taruvaikulam Parish was created.

Originally, people were fully dependent on palm trees and fishing. Later, in 1974, a match factory was built by Rev. Fr. Ambrose, providing jobs and income to thousands of villagers.

== Places of interest ==
- Church of St. Michael – The first stone built church was built in 1875 and the present church was built in 1922. The 26 m (85 ft) tower was built in 1960 by Rev. Fr. Maria Manikam by receiving contributions from the villagers. From 20 to 29 September every year the church attracts a huge crowd for the feast of St. Michael.
- Church of St. Nicholas – The church of St. Nicholas resides in the centre of Tharuvaikulam. It is famous for its festival, which occurs at the end of January.
- Church of St. Antony
- CSI St.Peter's Church
- Tharuvaikulam Beach
- Statue of Kamaraj

== Economy ==
Fishing is the major industry, with fish such as tiger prawns and lobsters being mostly exported. Coral mining and diving for conches is also performed, though activity is declining. The government actively discourages these activities as Tharuvaikulam falls under the Gulf of Mannar Marine National Park.

A number of prawn hatcheries had sprouted up since 1990, but most shut down by 2000.

Salt mining is another lucrative industry. Production is mostly for industrial use.

Early in its history there was a flourishing trade in palm tree products which has gradually declined over time.

Agriculture is practiced on a small scale. Tharuvaikulam tomatoes are quite popular in the region. Red chilies are another favorite from the region. The vagaries of weather, however do not permit regular cultivation.
