= Pasuvanthanai =

Pasuvanthanai Pasuvai
- Village
- Location in Tamil Nadu, India
- Coordinates: 8°59′56″N 77°57′54″E
- Country: India
- State: Tamil Nadu
- District: Thoothukudi
- Elevation: 60 m (200 ft)

Population (2011)
  - Total: 4,186

Languages
  - Official: Tamil
- Time zone: UTC+5:30 (IST)
- PIN: 628718
- Telephone code: 0461
- Vehicle registration: TN 69
- Nearest city: Kovilpatti
- Sex ratio: 1,083 ♂/♀
- Lok Sabha constituency: Thoothukudi
- Assembly constituency: Vilathikulam
- Website: Social media

Pasuvanthanai also spelt as Passuvandanai is a panchayat village in Ottapidaram Taluk in Thoothukudi district in the Indian state of Tamil Nadu.

== Geography ==
Pasuvanthanai is 35 kilometres (22 mi) from the district headquarters Thoothukudi. It lies 10 kilometres (6 mi) east of Kadambur on the Madurai-Nellai railway line, 20 kilometres (10 mi) east of Kayathar off the North-South Corridor, and 11 kilometres (7 mi) west of Eppothum Vendram on the Madurai-Thoothukudi National Highway.

== Climate and rainfall ==
The climate of Pasuvanthanai is hot and dry. Temperatures range between a maximum of 37 °C (99 °F) and a minimum of 22 °C (72 °F).
April to June are the hottest months and December and January are coldest, with temperatures rising towards the end of February. Rainfall occurs mostly during the north-east monsoon in the months of October to December, and a few summer showers are experienced in May.

== Demographics ==
As of 2011 India census, Pasuvanthanai has 1,212 houses and has a population of 4186. There were 2014 males and 2172 females; the effective sex ratio was 1,078 females per 1000 males, above the state average of 995. 467 were aged 0–6 years, which makes up 11.16% of total population, of whom 243 are male and 224 are female. Child Sex Ratio for the Pasuvanthanai as per census is 922, lower than Tamil Nadu average of 943. 2721 persons were literate, for a literacy rate of 65%. Male literacy stands at 82.72% while female literacy rate is 64.48%.

Pasuvanthanai village of Thoothukkudi has substantial population of Schedule Caste. Schedule Caste (SC) constitutes 27.21% while Schedule Tribe (ST) were 0.29% of total population in Pasuvanthanai village.

== Agriculture and commerce ==
Dry land agriculture predominates in Pasuvanthanai. Due to the vagaries of the monsoon, agriculture is not profitable. Black gram, green gram, groundnuts, pearl millet, sesame, red chillies, cotton and maize are widely cultivated. Paddy is also cultivated on few parts. Animal husbandry, mostly goat and sheep, has become common due to the difficult dry farming conditions. People are involved in trade and commerce. Pasuvanthanai is served by Tamil Nadu grama Bank, Tamilnad mercantile bank and Pasuvanthanai Co-Operative Bank. ATM services are offered by Tamilnad Mercantile Bank and Indicash.

== Schools ==
- Government Higher Secondary School
- Panchayat Union Primary School
- St James R C Primary School

== Transport ==
State Highway 77 crisscrosses through Pasuvanthanai and connects it with Kovilpatti and Puthiamputhur. Regular bus service operates to places like Thoothukudi, Kovilpatti, Tirunelveli, Kayathar, and Chennai.

The nearest railway station is 14 kilometres (9 mi) away, at Kadambur. The nearest airport is 44.4 kilometres (30 mi) away, at Vagaikulam,(tuticorin)

== Landmarks ==
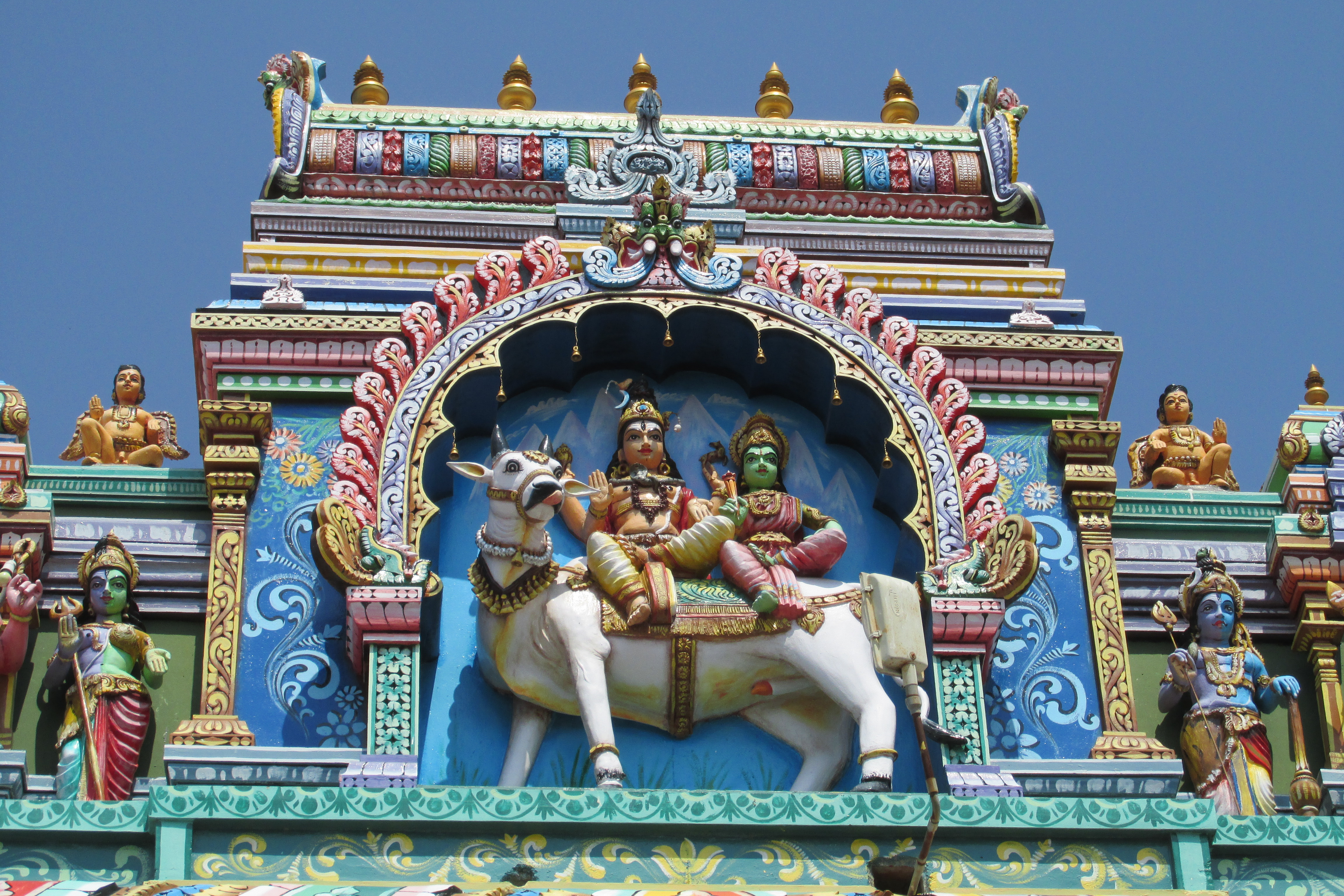
Details of Temple Arch on Temple street

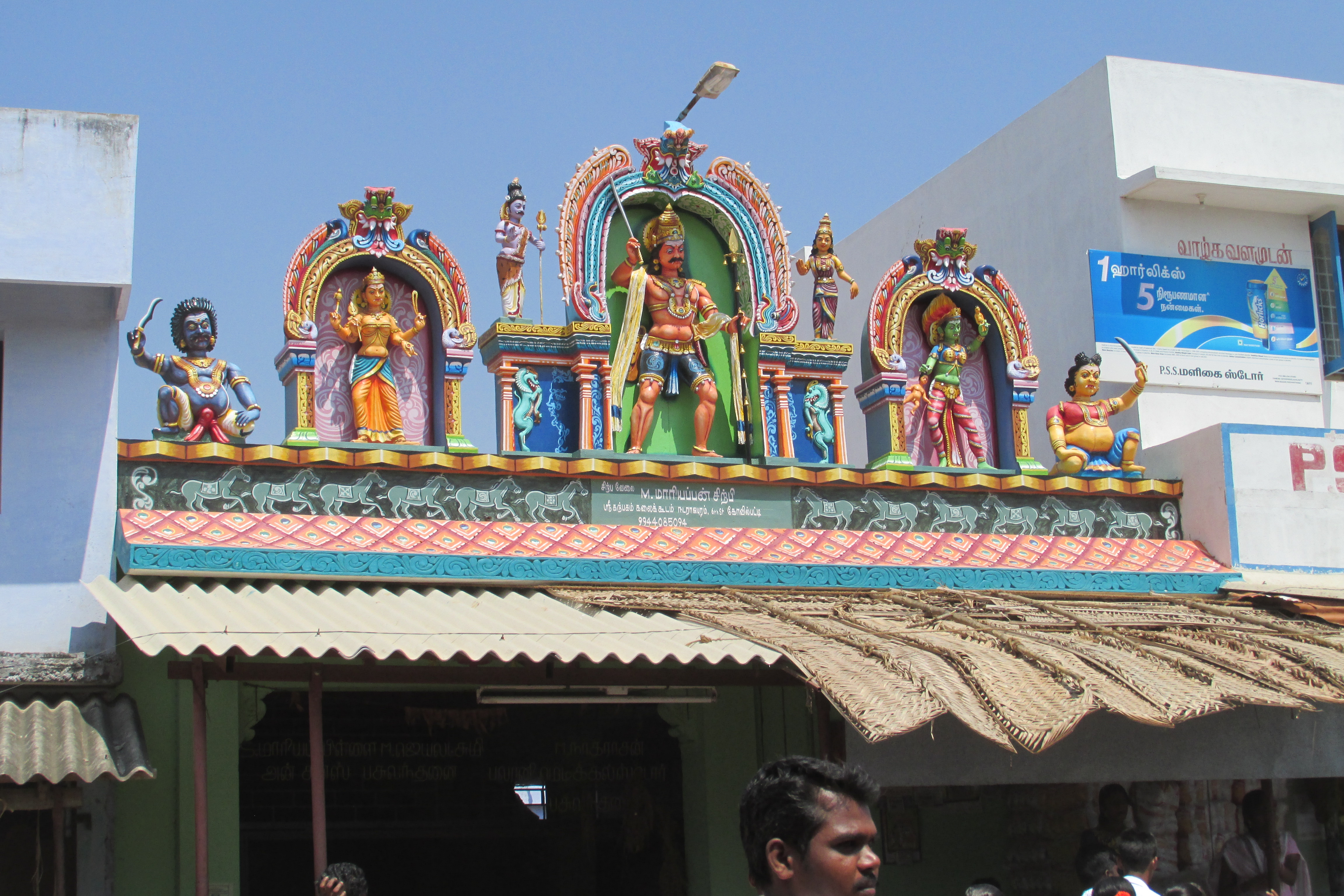
Village deity Temple

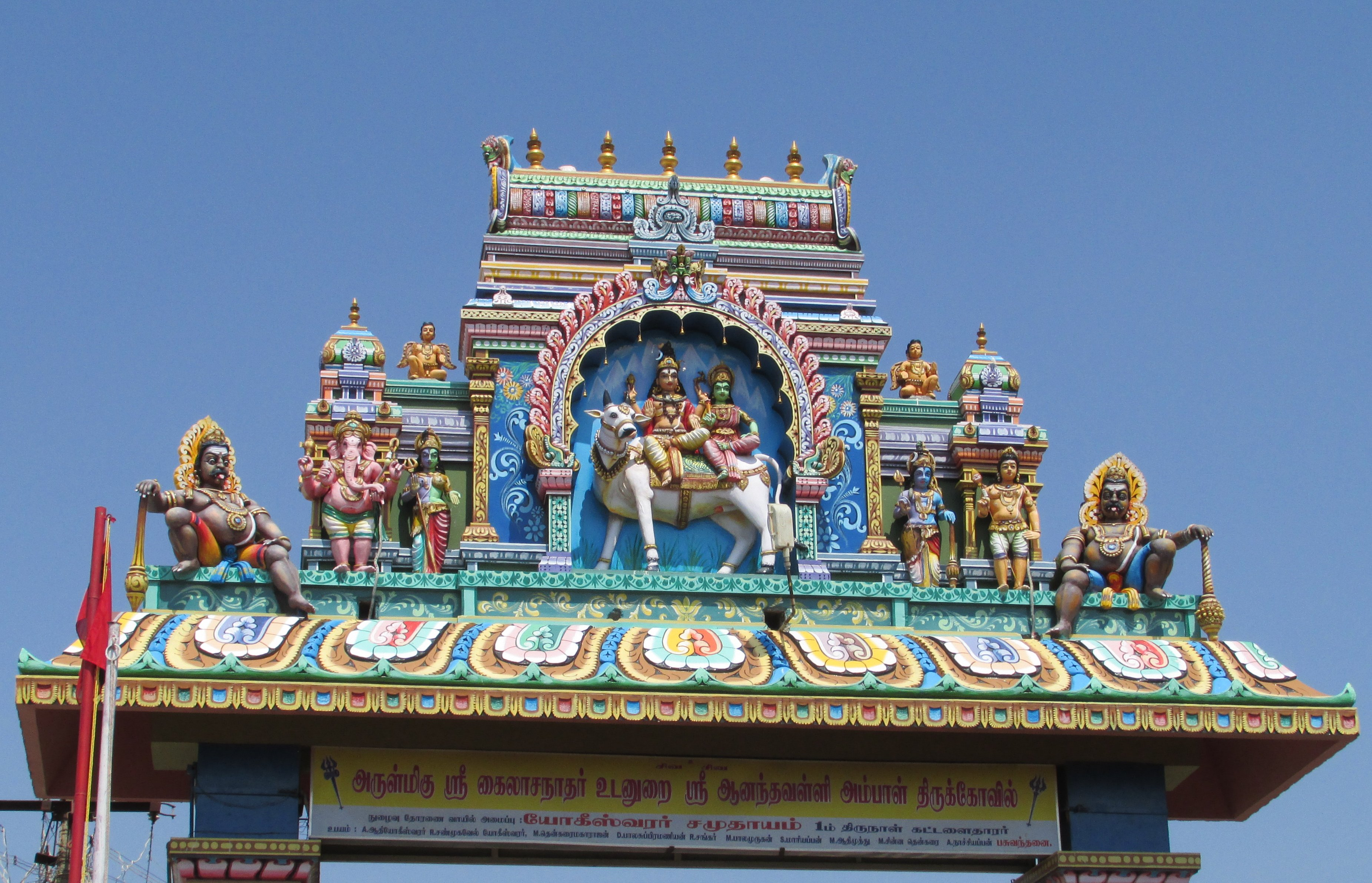
Pasuvanthanai kailaasanathar temple arch

=== Arulmigu Sri Kailasanathar udanurai Sri Aanandavalli Ambal ThiruKovil ===
The main deity Kailasanathar is in linga form and it is a Suyambu in origin, goddess is Anadhavalli. Currently, the temple is maintained by Arulmighu Kailasanathasamy Devasthanam board.

On an ordinary day, visitors could see all the mounts of the deities parked inside the temple premises in the pillared halls. visitors could also see permanent huge pillars cut out of single granite rocks standing in front of the temple as it serves to put huge pandal in front of the temple during festivities. These pillar rocks are very old and few of them has paved way to concrete pillars.

The Grand Chitirai festival is celebrated with religious fervor and gaiety during the Tamil month of Cithirai. The festival is celebrated for 11 days with deities taken on a grand procession on different mounts on each day.
The main event, Therottam (Temple Car festival), falls on the 9th day of the festival where people hailing from distant villages of the district participate to pull the grand temple car around the 4 majestic streets surrounding the temple. The festival ends with the Thirukalyanam (celestial wedding) of Sri Kailasanathar with Sri Anandavalli Amman on the 11th day.

Annaabishegam is celebrated on the full moon day of Tamil month of Ippasi and Siva-Rathiri is observed in traditional way during the month of Maasi.

Soorasambharam is also celebrated with vibrant displays, featuring artist who perform dramatic reenactments using learge-scale figures.

Three heavy and huge pots like vessels made of copper are present inside the temple and it is used to store paddy which is harvested from the land belonging to the temple. These pots are very old in age and it attracts the visitors-by for its size and shape.

== Epigraph in Pasuvanthanai ==
A couple of inscriptions are found inside Kailasanathasamy Temple and these throw light in the history of the temple and its origin. The inscription says about the land donations given to the temple by Aalasundara Perumal for the construction of the Sivan temple. These inscriptions belong to 1245 AD the period of 7th regnal year of Great King Maravarman SundaraPandiyan II. The inscription also says on the country & old name of the village, as per the inscription, this village belongs to "mudhukudi nadu" and its classical name is "pasunthalaiyana pavithra maanikapuram"
