= Ottapidaram =

Taluk in Tamil Nadu, India

- Taluk of Thoothukudi District
- Location in Tamil Nadu, India
- Coordinates: 8.9178881°N 78.0227137°E
- Country: India
- State: Tamil Nadu
- District: Thoothukudi

Population (2011)
  - Total: 7,963

Languages
  - Official: Tamil
- Time zone: UTC+5:30 (IST)
- PIN: 628401
- Telephone code: 0461
- Vehicle registration: TN 69
- Nearest city: Thoothukudi
- Sex ratio: 500 ♂/♀
- Literacy: 90%
- Lok Sabha constituency: Thoothukudi
- Vidhan Sabha constituency: Ottapidaram
- Climate: 28-42 (Köppen)

Ottapidaram is a small town in Thoothukudi district and headquarters of Ottapidaram taluk.

== Demographics ==
- Ottapidaram had a population of Ottapidaram as per the 2011 Census, out of which 4000 are males while 3963 are females in the town.
- The population of children aged 0-6 is 864 which is 10.85% of total population of the town.
- The female sex ratio is of 991 against the Tamilnadu state average of 996. Moreover the child sex ratio in Komaralingam is around 943 compared to Tamil Nadu state average of 943.
- The literacy rate of the town is 84.70% against the state average of 80.09%. The male literacy is around 90.33% while the female literacy rate is 79.06 &.
- The Schedule Caste (SC) constitutes about 54.36% of the population, while the Schedule Tribe (ST) were 0.72% of total population in the town.

== Villages ==
Villages in Ottapidaram include:

- Tharuvaikulam
- Panchalankurichi
- Sillanatham

== Notable people ==
V. O. Chidambaram Pillai, Independence Activist

== Landmarks ==
1.V. O. Chidambaram Pillai Memorial House

2.V. O. C. Memorial Hall (Mandapam)

3.Sri Kasi Viswanathar Temple

4.Perumal Temple (Vishnu Temple)

5.Ottapidaram Weekly Market

== See also ==
- Vilathikulam
- Kovilpatti
- Srivaikuntam
- Thiruchendur
- Ettayapuram
- Vadakku Bommaiyapuram
- Melaseithalai
