= A. Sivaperumal =

Indian politician

A. Sivaperumal was an Indian politician and former Member of the Legislative Assembly. He was elected to the Tamil Nadu legislative assembly as an Anna Dravida Munnetra Kazhagam candidate from Ottapidaram constituency in the 2001 election.
