= Ottapidaram taluk =

Ottapidaram
- Taluk
- Interactive map of Ottapidaram
- Country: India
- State: Tamil Nadu
- District: Thoothukudi

Ottapidaram taluk is a taluk of Thoothukudi district of the Indian state of Tamil Nadu. The headquarters of the taluk is the town of Ottapidaram.

== Demographics ==
According to the 2011 census, the taluk of Ottapidaram had a population of 123,097 with 61,822 males and 61,275 females. There were 991 women for every 1000 men. The taluk had a literacy rate of 73.21. Child population in the age group below 6 was 6,143 Males and 5,876 Females.
