= S. Vedachalam =

Indian politician

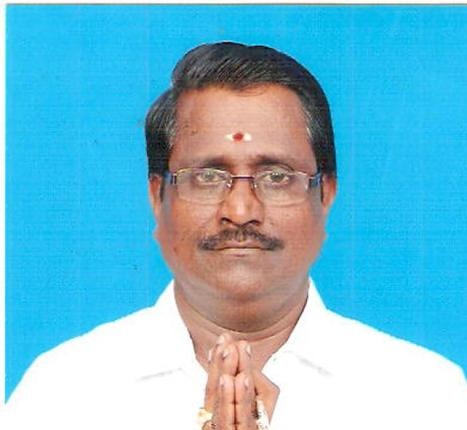

Member of the Ambattur Constituency, Tamil Nadu, India
- In office May 15, 2011 – May 13, 2016
- Succeeded by: V. Alexander

Personal details
- Born: 18 June 1953 (age 73)
- Party: Amma Makkal Munnetra Kazhagam
- Spouse: V. Mohana
- Children: 4

S. Vedachalam is an Indian politician and was a member of the 14th Tamil Nadu Legislative Assembly from the Ambattur constituency. He represented the All India Anna Dravida Munnetra Kazhagam party. At present, he represents Amma Makkal Munnetra Kazhagam.

The elections of 2016 resulted in his constituency being won by V. Alexander.

== Electoral performance ==
Election	Constituency	Political party	Result	Vote %	Opposition			Ref
Election	Constituency	Political party	Result	Vote %	Candidate	Political party	Vote %	Ref
2011	Ambattur	AIADMK	Won	53.30%	B. Ranaganathan	DMK	41.11%	
2021	Ambattur	AMMK	Lost	1.11%	Joseph Samuel	DMK	48.14%	-
