= S. S. Sivasankar =

Indian politician

Honourable S. S. Sivasankar

Tamil Nadu Minister for Transport
- In office 29 March 2022 – 5 May 2026
- Chief Minister: M.K. Stalin
- Preceded by: Raja Kannappan
- Succeeded by: A. Vijay Tamilan Parthipan

Tamil Nadu Minister for Backward Classes Welfare
- In office 7 May 2021 – 29 March 2022
- Chief Minister: M.K. Stalin
- Preceded by: S. Valarmathi
- Succeeded by: Raja Kannappan

Member of Tamil Nadu Legislative Assembly
- Incumbent
- Assumed office 11 May 2021
- Preceded by: R. T. Ramachandran
- Constituency: Kunnam
- In office 23 May 2011 – 24 May 2016
- Preceded by: Constituency created
- Succeeded by: R. T. Ramachandran
- Constituency: Kunnam
- In office 17 May 2006 – 22 May 2011
- Preceded by: J. Guru
- Succeeded by: None (Constituency merged with Jayankondam and Kunnam)
- Constituency: Andimadam

Personal details
- Born: 24 March 1969 (age 57) Devanur, Tiruchirappalli district (now in Ariyalur district), Tamil Nadu, India
- Party: Dravida Munnetra Kazhagam (1993- present)
- Spouse: Gayathridevi
- Relations: S.S. Sivakumar (younger brother)
- Children: Sivasaran; Sivasurya
- Parent(s): Sivarajeshwari (mother); S. Sivasubramanian (father)
- Education: Annamalai University
- Occupation: Politician writer
- Website: http://sssivasankar.blogspot.com/ http://ss-sivasankar.blogspot.com/

S. Sivasubramanian Sivasankar is an Indian politician and writer from the Dravida Munnetra Kazhagam (DMK). He has represented Andimadam (2006–11), and Kunnam (2011–16; 2021-) constituencies in Tamil Nadu Legislative Assembly. He served as Tamil Nadu's Minister for the Welfare of Backward, Most Backward and Denotified Communities (2021–22) and Minister for Transport (2022-26) in the Council of Ministers under M.K. Stalin.

Sivasankar has authored three books: Makkaludan En Anubavangal (or Makkalodu Naan) (2015), Chozhan Raja Prapthi (2019), and Thozhar Chozhan (2019).

== Early life ==
Sivasankar was born on 24 March 1969 in the village of Devanur near Andimadam in present-day Ariyalur district, Tamil Nadu. His father S. Sivasubramanian was an ardent supporter of the Dravidian movement and was instrumental in strengthening the DMK in the district. Sivasankar's mother is Sivarajeshwari.

After attending Andimadam Government School, Sivasankar studied Bachelor of Engineering in the Department of Electrical and Electronics Engineering at Annamalai University. After graduating in 1991, he worked for a private company in Bangalore until 1993.

== Politics ==
=== Beginning and party posts ===
Sivasankar's political career began when he participated in an Anti-Hindi conference organized by the DMK in Tiruchirappalli in December 1978. He entered full-time politics in 1993, and was elected as the DMK Secretary of the Andimadam Union in 1999. In 2001, he was appointed DMK Secretary of the newly created Ariyalur district. After the district's DMK unit was merged with the Perambalur district unit, he continued as union secretary of Andimadam. Then, he once again became the District Secretary for Ariyalur and is presently in that post.

=== Civic Body Member (1996-2006) ===
From 1996 to 2001, Sivasankar served as Deputy President of Perambalur District Panchayat. Then he served as a member of Ariyalur District Panchayat till 2006.

=== Member of Legislative Assembly (2006-16; 2021-) ===
In the 2006 Tamil Nadu Legislative Assembly election, Sivasankar successfully contested in his home constituency of Andimadam.

In the 2011 Assembly election, he won from Kunnam. On 31 January 2014, he was suspended for an entire assembly session for tearing up a copy of the customary speech by Konijeti Rosaiah, then Governor of Tamil Nadu.

In the 2016 Assembly election, Sivasankar contested from Ariyalur constituency and lost by 2,621 votes.

In the 2021 Assembly election, he re-contested in Kunnam and won by 6,329 votes.

=== Ministership (2021-26) ===
Following the victory of the DMK alliance in the 2021 election, Sivasankar was inducted into the M. K. Stalin ministry on 7 May 2021 as Minister for the Welfare of Backward, Most Backward and Denotified Communities. On 29 March 2022, his portfolio was transferred to Raja Kannappan and he in turn replaced the latter as Minister for Transport.

Sivasankar's electoral record (Assembly)
Year	Constituency	Result	Votes (%)	Opponent	Opponent's party	Opponent's votes (%)	Margin (%)
2006	Andimadam	Won	51,395 (45.32%)	K. Panneerselvam	All India Anna Dravida Munnetra Kazhagam	45,567 (40.18%)	5,828 (5.14%)
2011	Kunnam	Won	81,723 (46.88%)	Durai Kamaraj	Desiya Murpokku Dravida Kazhagam	58,766 (33.71%)	22,957 (13.17%)
2016	Ariyalur	Runner-up	85,902 (40.97%)	Thamarai S. Rajendran	All India Anna Dravida Munnetra Kazhagam	88,523 (41.94%)	2,621 (1.25%)
2021	Kunnam	Won	1,03,922 (47.26%)	R. T. Ramachandran	All India Anna Dravida Munnetra Kazhagam	97,593 (44.38%)	6,329 (2.87%)
2026	Kunnam	Won	87,237 (37.84%)	Saranya A	IJK (AIADMK)	71,680 (31.09%)	15,557 (6.75%)

== Other Posts ==
Sivasankar was interested in photography right from his college days. Consequently, he served as Secretary of the Photographers' Association. He has been a member of the Perambalur District Athletics Association and as President of the Tamil Nadu Silambam Association.

== Works ==
Year	Tamil title	Transliteration	Standardized English Title	Meaning	Type	Notes	Publisher
2015	மக்களுடன் என் அனுபவங்கள்: குன்னம் தொகுதி எம்.எல்.ஏவின் உணர்வும் பகிர்வும் (Alternative title) மக்களோடு நான்	Makkaḷuṭaṉ eṉ aṉupavaṅkaḷ: Kuṉṉam tokuti em.El.Ēviṉ uṇarvum pakirvum (Alternative title) Makkaḷōṭu nāṉ	Makkaludan En Anubavangal (Makkalodu Naan)	My Experiences with People: The Feeling and Sharing of the Kunnam MLA (Alternative title) I with the People	Diary	Collection of selected Facebook posts by Sivasankar.	Kizhakku Pathipagam
2019	சோழன் ராஜா ப்ராப்தி	Cōḻaṉ rājā prāpti	Chozhan Raja Prapthi (?)	Fortune of the Chola King (?)	Essay collection	Collection of articles featured on the guest page of Andhimazhai magazine.	Anthimazhai Pathipagam
2019	"தோழர்" சோழன்	"Tōḻar" cōḻaṉ	Thozhar Chozhan	"Comrade Chola"	Historical Novel	Set in the backdrop of Naxalism and Tamil separatist movements (such as the TNLA led by Thamizharasan of Ponparappi). This novel went to the finals in the "Pen to Publish" contest held by Kindle Direct Publishing in 2019.	Amazon Kindle

== Personal life ==
Sivasankar's residence is in Rajaji Nagar, Ariyalur. His wife Gayathridevi is a physician hailing from Papanasam (Thanjavur district). The couple has two sons: Sivasaran and Sivasurya.

== Media appearance ==
Sivasankar was one of the participants in Season 14 episode 21 of the television show Neeya Naana hosted by Gopinath Chandran on Vijay TV. In this episode (titled "Gopinath discusses Tamil Nadu") that aired on 10 February 2013, a student presented her position against reservation, citing 'arbitrary' caste-based concessions. In reply, Sivasankar famously gave an explanation:

Student-1: ....It was said that there is no fee for female students appearing for the GATE [exam] . It is ₹ 600-700 for [male] SC students. For the rest, ₹ 1500. I say that such differences need not be there. Let [the fee] be equal for all. All are well off.

Sivasankar:...Whom do you say "are well off" ?

Student-1: ... I do not mean everyone. I say this of those who are well off.

Sivasankar: ...[citing the example of a running race quoted by another participant]... If [we] place a person 100 metres behind and place you 100 metres ahead...that person's chance [to win] is diminished... In other words, how many of those running by your side have your stamina?...Those without eyesight...and those with impairment in their legs are also required to run along...Such weaker sections are there....You are speaking with Chennai in context. How many villages have you visited? Do you know the situation in villages. Even today, there's a compulsion in villages to work on the basis of one's caste. Do you know that? Do you know that they are refused the opportunities before them?...Social justice is something with a long history. There's no need for you to know it in full. All communities must be respected equally. But without a chance for that, they are down. Those at the bottom should be given a hand and raised up..[That action] is reservation. Another student claims that he himself belongs to the oppressed community but says it is embarrassing to get [concessions]. How can you feel embarrassed? Do you know what profession your father, grandfather and ancestors undertook? Do you know how oppressed they were?...For the sole reason that you've got an opportunity for education, that you've entered a college, that your friends think ill, you say no [to reservation] This is your personal view. But how many of those who were refused this opportunity undertake coolie work in the village? How many go to Kerala for work? None of you have thought of their plight. You only think that today "I'm well off.."

[The student whom he mentioned speaks]: Sir! [Reservation] is like something to be taken advantage of. None of those [coming through] reservation study...There's a course called Teacher Training. To study that, we're required to just pass Class 12 ....One just studies a day before exams, write the exam and receives pass marks...It's going just like that...

Sivasankar: Thambi (Note: a term of affection used for a younger male)! Do you know data regarding the number of SC students receiving high marks and getting placed in open quota for the last 5-10 years? [Student 2 nods in the negative] You don't know! You generally speak based on hearsay from your friend. What profession your grandfather undertook?

Student-2: Coolie.

Sivasankar: From that place ... [you've] crossed this many generations due to this reservation. [Hence] your family is able to educate you. You must understand that. We cannot change our life according to the talk of some four friends. More oppressed generation like you should come up. Speak after realizing this.

—
