= R. T. Ramachandran =

R. T. Ramachandran may refer to:

- R. T. Ramachandran (umpire)
- R. T. Ramachandran (politician)
