= 2021 Tamil Nadu Legislative Assembly election =

Indian election

2021 Tamil Nadu Legislative Assembly Election
- 6 April 2021

All 234 seats in the Tamil Nadu Legislative Assembly 118 seats needed for a majority
- Opinion polls
- Registered: 62,943,693
- Turnout: 72.73% (▼1.51%)
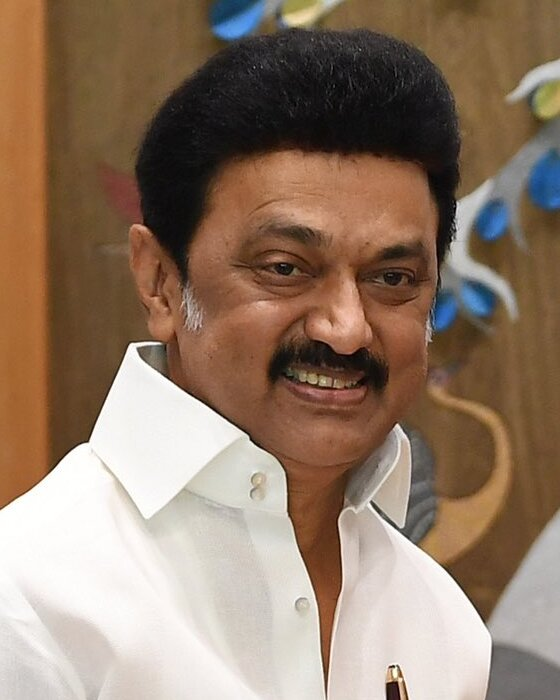

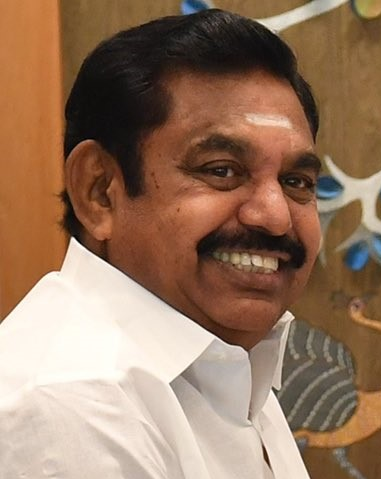
	Majority party	Minority party
Leader	M. K. Stalin	Edappadi K. Palaniswami
Party	DMK	AIADMK
Alliance	SPA	NDA
Leader since	1990	2017
Leader's seat	Kolathur	Edappadi
Last election	31.39%, 89 seats	40.88%, 136 seats
Seats won	133	66
Seat change	▲44	▼70
Popular vote	17,430,179	15,391,055
Percentage	37.70%	33.29%
Swing	▲6.31 pp	▼7.59 pp
Alliance seats	159	75
Alliance seat change	▲61	▼61
Alliance popular vote	20,982,088	18,363,499
Alliance percentage	45.38%	39.71%

Chief Minister before election
Edappadi K. Palaniswami
AIADMK
Elected Chief Minister
M. K. Stalin
DMK

Tamil Nadu legislative assembly election was held on 6 April 2021 to elect the representatives of the 16th Tamil Nadu assembly. Elections were held for all the 234 constituencies in the assembly. The Election Commission of India announced the schedule for the elections on 26 February 2021. The Dravida Munnetra Kazhagam (DMK) won the election, ending the decade-long reign of the All India Anna Dravida Munnetra Kazhagam (AIADMK), and M. K. Stalin was sworn in as the 12th Chief Minister of Tamil Nadu.

The poll was Tamil Nadu's first assembly election after the demise of the two most prominent chief ministers in the state's modern history, J. Jayalalithaa of the AIADMK, and M. Karunanidhi of the DMK, who died in 2016 and 2018, respectively. With the AIADMK winning the 2016 election, Jayalalithaa had become the chief minister and served for almost six months before she died. Upon her death, O. Panneerselvam took charge as the chief minister, shortly after which Edappadi K. Palaniswami was sworn in as the chief minister in 2017, and served till the end of the 15th assembly's tenure.

The DMK led the Secular Progressive Alliance (SPA), consisting of the Indian National Congress, the Communist parties and others, and named Stalin as its candidate for the chief minister's office. The AIADMK joined the National Democratic Alliance (NDA), led by the Bharatiya Janata Party, the ruling party of the Union Government of India, and projected Palanisami as its chief ministerial candidate. The polling was held with COVID-19 safety guidelines, and the state recorded a voter turnout of 73.63%. Surveys before and after the polls predicted a win for the DMK-led SPA. The votes were counted on 2 May 2021, and the SPA won 159 seats, with the DMK winning in 133 constituencies, securing an absolute majority for the first time in 25 years. The NDA won 75 seats, out of which 66 were won by the AIADMK. 11 ministers from the outgoing Palaniswami cabinet were defeated in their respective constituencies. The DMK formed the state government for the sixth time, and the M. K. Stalin ministry was sworn in on 7 May 2021.

== Overview ==
The state of Tamil Nadu is divided into 234 assembly constituencies, each of which elects a member (called an MLA) to represent it at the state's unicameral legislative assembly, as per Article 168 of the Constitution of India. The Tamil Nadu Legislative Assembly convenes at Fort St. George, Chennai. The chief ministerial candidate that receives the support of the majority of MLAs, which is a minimum of 118 members, is appointed as the Chief Minister of Tamil Nadu, who is the executive head of the Government of Tamil Nadu. The Governor of Tamil Nadu, the state's ceremonial head, will invite the Chief-Minister-elect and his Council of Ministers to be sworn in, to lead the state government for a term of the next five years.

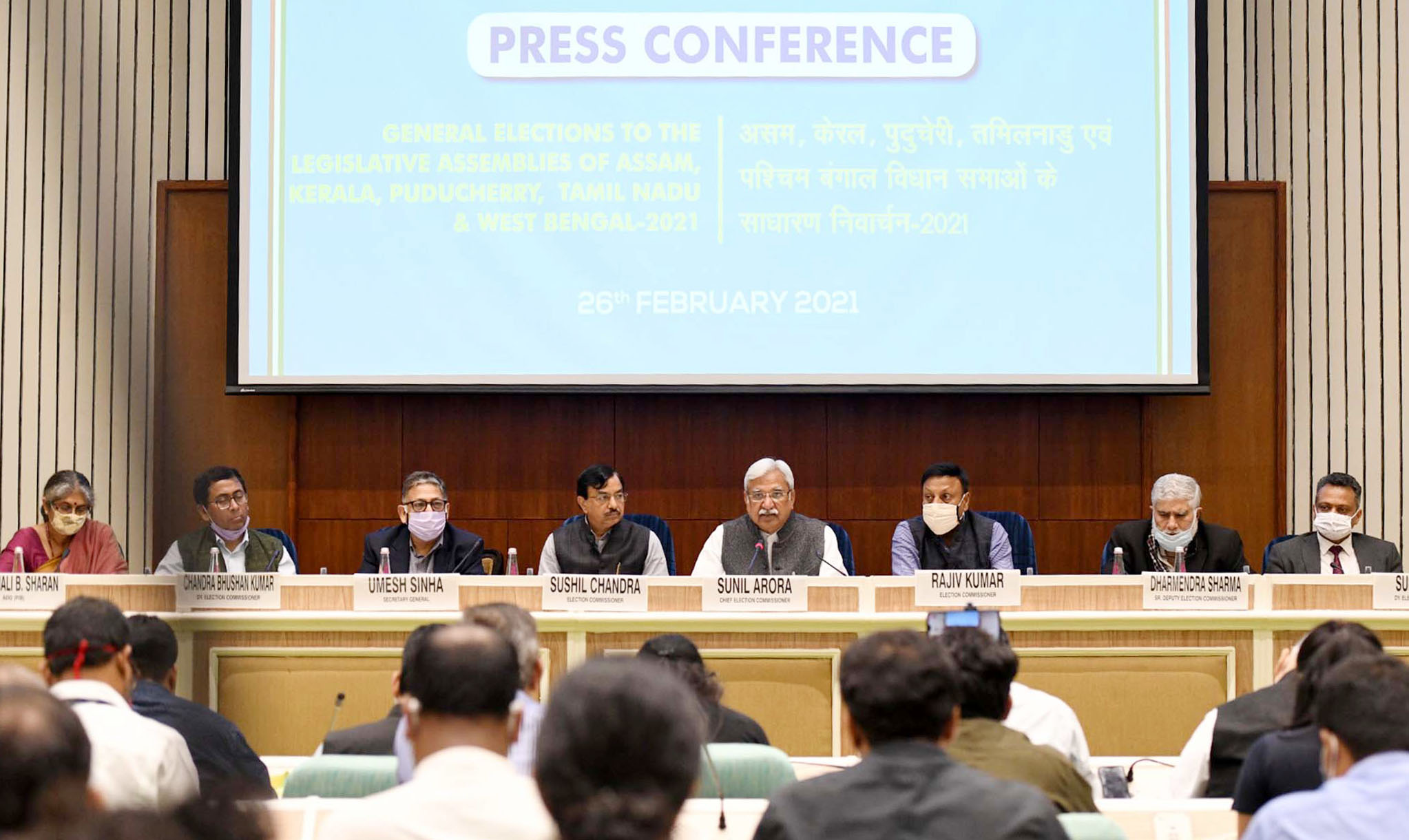
The Chief Election Commissioner of India, Sunil Arora, holding a press conference in New Delhi on February 26, 2021, to announce the schedule for Legislative Assembly election of Tamil Nadu along with those of Assam, Kerala, West Bengal, and Puducherry.

Tamil Nadu's partisan politics have been dominated by its two regional Dravidian parties, Dravida Munnetra Kazhagam (DMK) and All India Anna Dravida Munnetra Kazhagam (AIADMK), for the last 50 years (since 1967). Each recognized party in India is given a polling symbol by the Election Commission of India, an independent and neutral body of officers that conducts and regulates all the elections in the country. The DMK contests with the Rising Sun symbol, while the AIADMK contests with the Two Leaves.

The legislative assembly of Tamil Nadu goes to polls alongside the legislative assemblies of three other Indian states, namely Assam, Kerala, and West Bengal, and that of the union territory of Puducherry.

=== Background ===
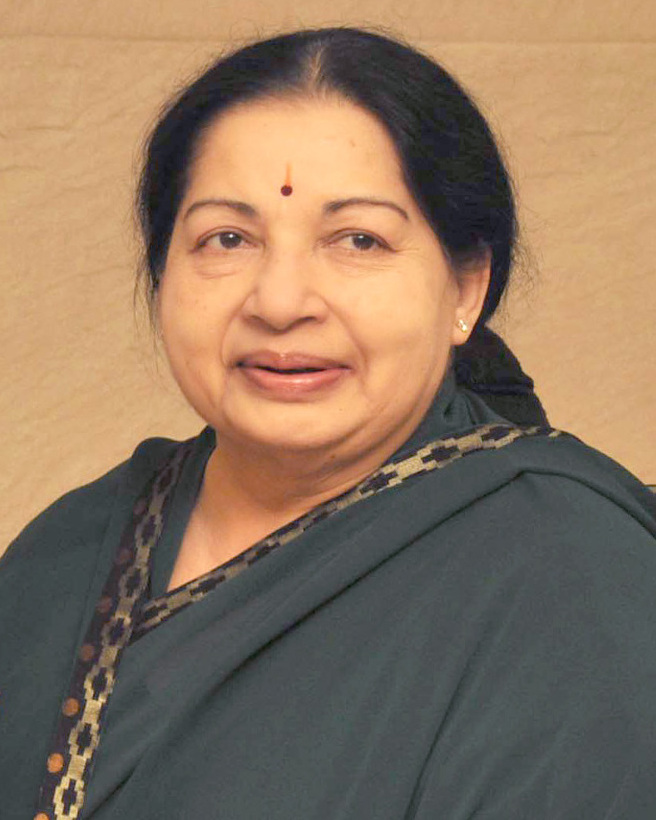
J. Jayalalithaa
1948–2016

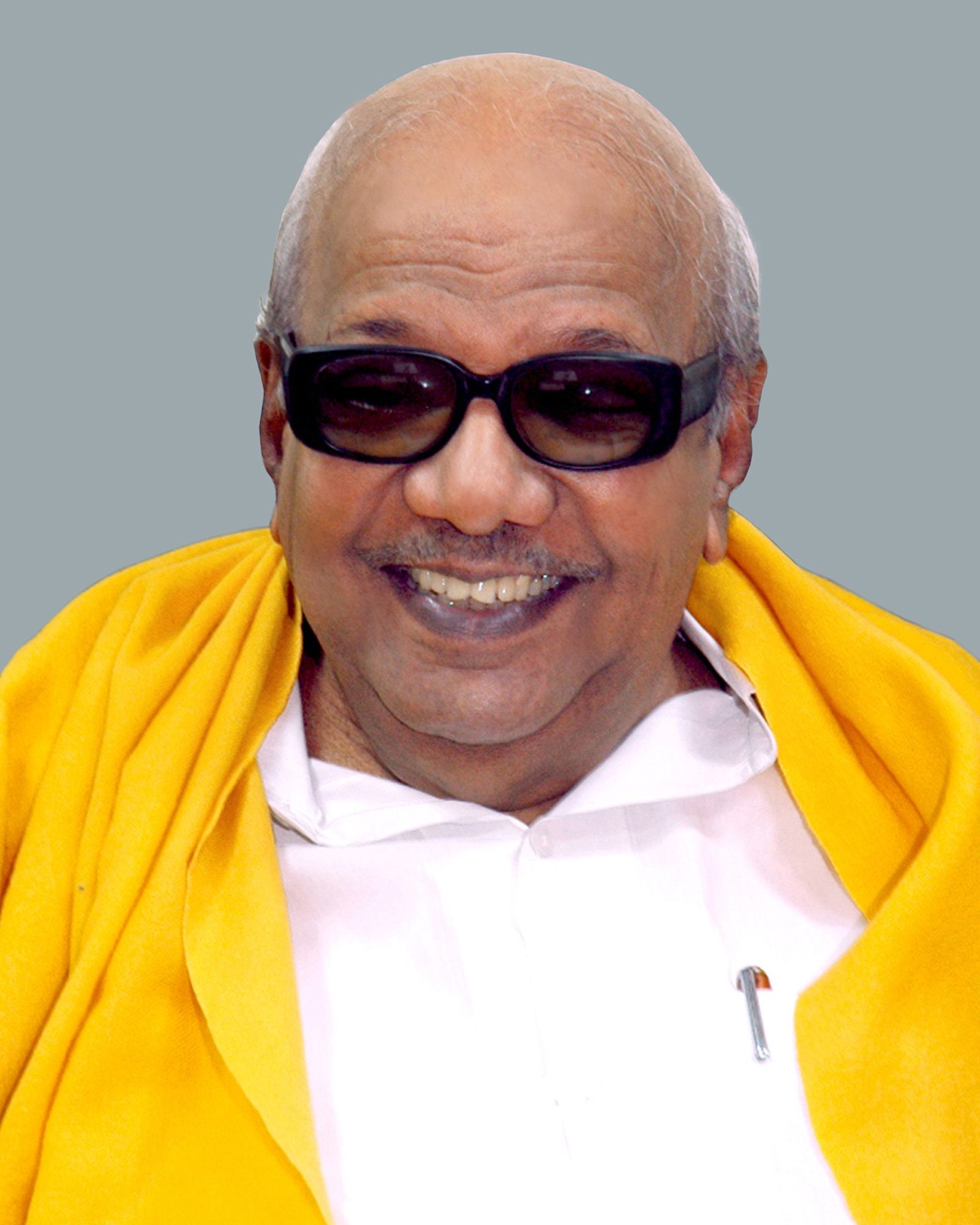
M. Karunanidhi
1924–2018

The sixteenth legislative assembly election is the first election to the body after the deaths of the two most prominent Chief Ministers and political supremos of modern Tamil Nadu, J. Jayalalithaa (pictured left) and M. Karunanidhi (right).

Since the death of AIADMK founder M.G Ramachandran (who had been in power since 1977) in 1987, DMK's M Karunanidhi (who came into prominence in 1969 following the death of DMK founder C.N Annadurai) & AIADMK's J Jayalalitha heavily dominated the state's politics. DMK won the 1989, 1996 & 2006 elections while AIADMK won the 1991, 2001 & 2011 elections. In 2016, AIADMK retained its majority with 136 seats, while the DMK increased its strength to 98 seats. Jayalalitha became the second incumbent Chief minister of Tamil Nadu to be re-elected back in power since MGR's re-election in 1984. 2021's election of the sixteenth assembly election is the first state election after the deaths of Jayalalithaa and Karunanidhi, who died in 2016 and 2018 respectively.

==== Rise and fall of V.K. Sasikala ====
Following Jayalalithaa's demise from cardiac arrest on 5 December 2016, O. Panneerselvam of the AIADMK became the Chief Minister of Tamil Nadu for the third time. The first two times he attained the post (21 September 2001 to 2 March 2002, and 28 September 2014 to 23 May 2015) was when Jayalalithaa was forcibly removed from office twice due to the lawsuit against her. He served as the Acting Chief Minister during Jayalalithaa's hospitalization in 2016. However, soon after swearing-in, Panneerselvam rebelled against the influence of V. K. Sasikala, a long-time friend and close aide of Jayalalithaa, inside the AIADMK party, and deemed her a threat to his Chief Ministership, exposing the factionalism inside the party. In a meeting of the party's general council held on 29 December 2016, the first meeting after Jayalalithaa's death, Sasikala was appointed as the party's temporary general secretary. On 5 February 2017, all the MLAs of the AIADMK unanimously elected Sasikala as the Legislative Assembly leader of the AIADMK, making her the Chief-Minister-elect officially.

On 6 February 2017, Panneerselvam submitted his resignation letter to then Governor of Tamil Nadu, C. Vidyasagar Rao, who accepted the resignation but instructed him to continue to functioning as Chief Minister "until alternate arrangements are made", awaiting the pending verdict of the 18-year-long trial regarding the disproportionate assets of Jayalalithaa and Sasikala. Later Pannerselvam made mediation in Jayalalithaa's memorial on 7 February and he was coerced into resignation. He called it as "Dharmayudam". Later in the 9 February, Sasikala met the Governor and laid claims to the Chief Ministership, by submitting the list of AIADMK legislators who back her. Reports stated Sasikala had those MLAs sequestered at a resort in South Chennai named Koovathur.

On 14 February 2017, the Supreme Court of India pronounced Sasikala and her relatives guilty of criminally conspiring, laundering and amassing illicit wealth worth about ₹66.44 crore (equivalent to ₹396 crore or US$42 million in 2026) in the 1990s, and sentenced them to serve a four-year jail term at Central Prison, Bangalore, giving the convicts 24 hours to surrender. This restored in toto her earlier conviction in the case delivered on 27 September 2014. Proceedings against Jayalalithaa had been abated and dismissed on account of her death. The conviction effectively ended Sasikala's Chief Ministerial ambitions.

Following Sasikala's conviction, the Governor rejected her claims to become the Chief Minister of Tamil Nadu. In her ticking 24-hour surrender time-limit and capacity as the general secretary of the AIADMK, Sasikala convened the party's MLAs, who unanimously elected Edappadi K. Palaniswami, a then supporter of Sasikala, as the new Chief Minister. She also appointed her nephew and former treasurer of the party, T. T. V. Dhinakaran, as the party's deputy general secretary. Palaniswami as sworn in as the Chief Minister of Tamil Nadu the next day, replacing Panneerselvam.

On 23 March 2017, the Election commission of India designated the two factions separately; Panneerselvam's faction known as "AIADMK (Puratchi Thalaivi Amma)", while Dhinakaran-Palaniswami's faction known as "AIADMK (Amma)". By-polls were announced at the Dr. Radhakrishnan Nagar constituency, which was vacated due to Jayalalithaa's death. Dhinakaran was named candidate by his faction. However, the Election Commission canceled the by-polls after evidence of large-scale bribing by the ruling AIADMK (Amma) surfaced. On 17 April 2017, Delhi Police registered a case against Dhinakaran for allegedly attempting to bribe the Election Commission into giving the AIADMK's significant Twin Leaves symbol to his faction. Dhinakaran was granted bail on the grounds that the police failed to identify the bribed officer.

In the following months, the Chief Minister had a fallout with Dhinakaran. Palaniswami pronounced Dhinakaran's appointment as deputy general secretary "invalid" on 17 August 2017, and ousted him from the party.

==== AIADMK under Dual Leadership ====
On 21 August 2017, it was reported that the Paneerselvam faction of AIADMK had decided to merge back with the Palaniswami faction, under the terms that Sasikala would be expelled from the party. On 21 August 2017, both Palaniswami and Paneerselvam factions of the AIADMK reunited, with the leaders assuming co-leadership of the party. Panneerselvam sworn in as the Deputy Chief Minister of Tamil Nadu, Finance Minister of Tamil Nadu and the coordinator of the AIADMK. Palaniswami was dubbed the joint coordinator of the party. Mainstream media and publications suspected the involvement of the Bharatiya Janata Party, the ruling party of the Union Government of India, in the AIADMK's merger. This marked the first time the BJP began to play an influential role in the Tamil Nadu politics, acting as the mediator that united the two factions. Dhinakaran and his supporters continued to dub themselves the "real AIADMK".

On 22 August 2017, 18 MLAs of the AIADMK pledged allegiance to Dhinakaran and submitted letters to the Governor, expressing lack of confidence in Palaniswami and withdrawing their support to the Palaniswami-led government. Immediately, those MLAs were expelled from the AIADMK. The Speaker of the fifteenth Tamil Nadu Legislative Assembly, P. Dhanapal, also disqualified those MLAs from their offices, citing the Constitution Act of 1985, which prevents the instability caused by democratically elected representatives in India's legislatures shifting allegiance from the parties they supported at the time of election, or disobeying their parties' decisions at critical times, by rendering their seats vacant. This resulted in a long legal battle, at the end of which, the Madras High Court, the highest court of Tamil Nadu, gave a verdict in the Speaker's favour and confirmed the disqualification of the 19 legislators. Following these events, Sasikala was expelled from the party on 12 September 2017, with her position as interim general secretary disputed and abolished. Instead, the late Jayalalithaa was named the eternal general secretary of AIADMK.

On 23 November 2017, the Election Commission of India granted the Two Leaves symbol to the Palaniswami-Panneerselvam led AIADMK, authorizing the faction as the original AIADMK, and announced by-polls to the vacant seat of Radhakrishnan Nagar on 21 December 2017. Dhinakaran contested in the constituency as an independent candidate, and won the election with a huge margin, with around 40,000 votes more than his closest competitor. He became the first independent candidate in Tamil Nadu history to win a bypoll, claiming 50.32% of the total votes, defeating the ruling AIADMK and the opposition DMK.

In March 2018, Dinakaran formed the new party Amma Makkal Munnettra Kazagam (AMMK), with the goal of obtaining control of the AIADMK.

==== Rise of M. K. Stalin ====
After Karunanidhi's demise on 7 August 2018, Karunanidhi's son and political heir M. K. Stalin, who has served as the Deputy Chief Minister of Tamil Nadu and the Mayor of Chennai, became the unquestioned president of the DMK. The Election Commission of India announced by-polls to 24 vacant seats in the state, alongside the 2019 Indian parliamentary elections, which elects 543 members across India to its lower house, the Lok Sabha. The DMK-led Secular Progressive Alliance (nationally, United Progressive Alliance headed by the Indian National Congress) swept Tamil Nadu in the Lok Sabha elections, winning a landslide 38 seats out of the state's 39 parliamentary constituencies. The AIADMK, which contested the election in an alliance with the BJP and the regional DMDK, won only one seat (Theni). This marked a huge shift from the 2014 parliamentary elections, in which the AIADMK had won 37 seats solo, whereas the NDA won two and the DMK none. In the by-polls, out of the 24 formerly AIADMK seats in the state assembly, the Stalin-led DMK won over 13 seats while the AIADMK won 10, indicating a shift in the political mindset of the state's voters. Although the incumbent AIADMK government lost 13 of its seats to the opposition party, the 10 retained seats (with new MLAs to represent them) were enough to maintain the AIADMK's absolute majority at the Legislative Assembly.

==== Tussle in AIADMK over Chief Ministerial candidate ====
The Tussle started in October 2020 when Minister for Milk and Dairy development K. T. Rajenthra Bhalaji tweeted that the party should go for elections, with EPS as the CM candidate. A day before Balaji's tweet, Cooperative Minister Sellur K. Raju said, “MLAs will elect the chief minister” when AIADMK wins the 2021 elections. Finally, then DCM Panneerselvam made the announcement that Palaniswami would be the chief ministerial candidate of the AIADMK on 20 October 2020 morning at a much awaited meeting at the AIADMK office in Chennai.

==== Sasikala's Announcement ====
In January 2021, VK Sasikala was released from jail after completion of her prison time. In February 2021, she announced her intention to actively involve herself in the state's politics. Nevertheless, on 3 March 2021, she announced her decision to quit politics, to everyone's surprise.

=== Key Issues ===
In order to improve the economy after the COVID-19 pandemic, both the AIADMK and DMK promised jobs in their manifestos. Industries, especially MSMEs, have been hit hard by the slowdown in the economy. The AIADMK-led government approved a sub-quota in MBC of 10.5% for the Vanniyars, who are particularly dominant in northern Tamil Nadu. The AIADMK & BJP also fulfilled the demand of grouping 7 castes under Devendrakula Velalar an agricultural community found in Tamil Nadu. Recent events such as the Thoothukudi protest in 2018 against the district's Sterlite Copper plant and the Kattupalli fishermen's agitation against the expansion of Adani port have also made environmental concerns, especially climate change, a topic of debate in the elections.

=== Madras High Court comments on Election Commission ===
On 26 April 2021, the Madras High Court remarked that the Election Commission should be put on murder charges for allowing rallies. Further, the court said that the Election Commission was the only institution responsible for the deadly second wave of COVID-19 pandemic in India as the elections of four states and a union territory were being held when second wave was striking India.

== Schedule ==
Event	Date
Date for Nominations	12 March 2021
Last Date for filing Nominations	19 March 2021
Date for scrutiny of nominations	20 March 2021
Last date for withdrawal of candidatures	22 March 2021
Date of poll	6 April 2021
Date of counting	2 May 2021
Date before which the election shall be completed	24 May 2021

== Manifestos ==
Election Manifesto plays a key role in determining the voting behaviour of the voters in the Tamil Nadu Electoral Politics. Various parties released their manifestos ahead of the polls.

== Voter statistics ==
According to the ECI, 62.6 million people were eligible to vote in upcoming assembly elections in Tamil Nadu. Sholinganallur assembly has the highest number of eligible voters with 694,845 voters.

Total voters in Tamil Nadu for 2021 election
General electors	Service voters	Overseas voters	Total Voters
62,747,653	72,853	3,243	62,823,749

Total voters in Tamil Nadu for 2021 election by gender
Male voters	Female voters	Third gender voters	Total Voters
30,995,440	31,940,880	7,192	62,943,512

== Parties and Alliances ==
=== Secular Progressive Alliance ===
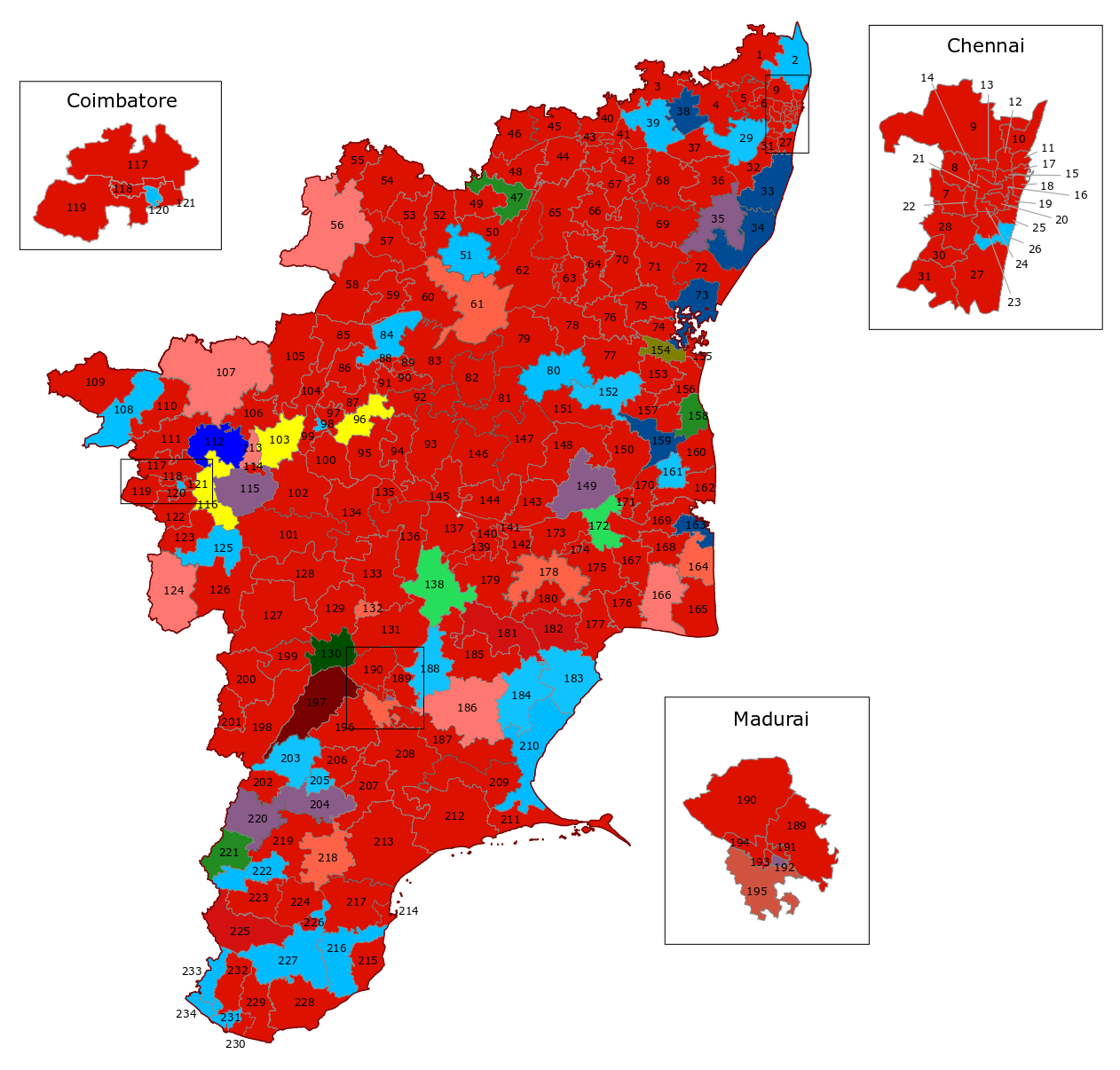
2021 Tamil Nadu Legislative Assembly Election SPA Seat Sharing Map

Secular Progressive Alliance
Party	Flag	Symbol	Leader	Seats contested	
Dravida Munnetra Kazhagam			M. K. Stalin	173	188
Marumalarchi Dravida Munnetra Kazhagam			Vaiko	6	188
Kongunadu Makkal Desia Katchi			E. R. Eswaran	3	188
Manithaneya Makkal Katchi			M. H. Jawahirullah	2	188
All India Forward Bloc			P. V. Kathiravan	1	188
Aathi Thamizhar Peravai			R. Athiyamaan	1	188
Makkal Viduthalai Katchi			S. K. Murugavel Rajan	1	188
Tamizhaga Vazhvurimai Katchi			T. Velmurugan	1	188
Indian National Congress			K. S. Alagiri	25	
Communist Party of India			R. Mutharasan	6	
Communist Party of India (Marxist)			K. Balakrishnan	6	
Viduthalai Chiruthaigal Katchi			Thol. Thirumavalavan	6	
Indian Union Muslim League			K. M. Kader Mohideen	3	
Total				234	

=== AIADMK-Led National Democratic Alliance ===
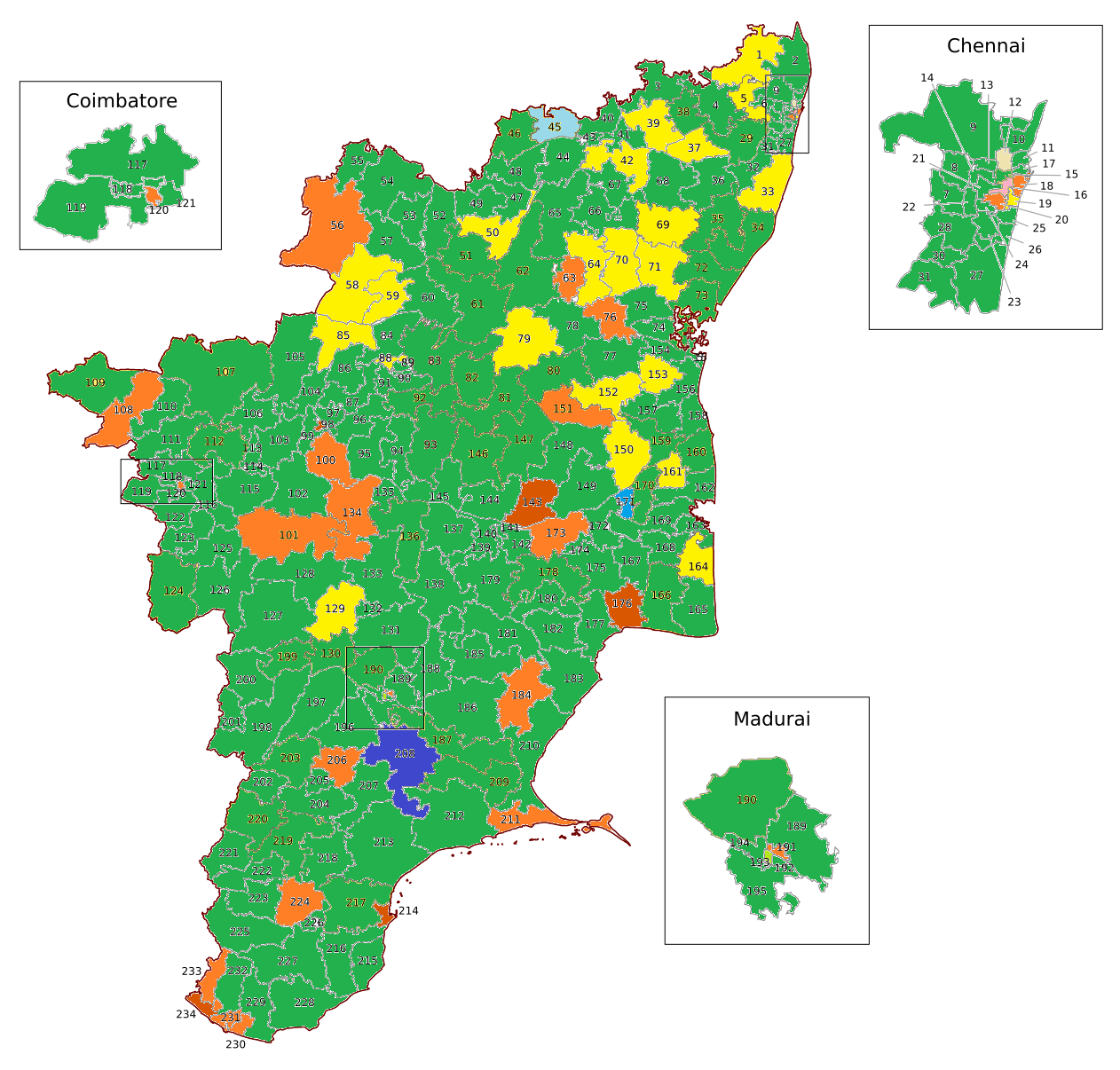
2021 Tamil Nadu Legislative Assembly Election NDA Seat Sharing Map

AIADMK-led National Democratic Alliance
Party	Flag	Symbol	Leader	Seats contested	
All India Anna Dravida Munnetra Kazhagam			O. Panneerselvam; Edappadi K. Palaniswami	179	191
Tamil Maanila Congress (Moopanar)			G. K. Vasan	6	191
All India Moovendar Munnani Kazhagam			N. Sethuraman	1	191
Moovendar Munnetra Kazhagam			Sridhar Vandayar	1	191
Pasumpon Desiya Kazhagam			Jothi Muthuramalingam	1	191
Perunthalaivar Makkal Katchi			N. R. Dhanapalan	1	191
Puratchi Bharatham Katchi			M. Jaganmoorthy	1	191
Tamizhaga Makkal Munnetra Kazhagam			B. John Pandian	1	191
Pattali Makkal Katchi			G. K. Mani	23	
Bharatiya Janata Party			L. Murugan	20	
Total				234	

=== AMMK-Led Alliance ===
AMMK-led Alliance
Party	Flag	Symbol	Leader	Contesting seats	
Amma Makkal Munnettra Kazhagam (Note: Election Commission of India allotted pressure cooker symbol to Amma Makkal Munnetra Kazhagam and Social Democratic Party of India individually.)			T. T. V. Dhinakaran	161	165
Gokula Makkal Katchi			M. V. Sekhar Yadav	1	165
Maruthu Senai Sangam			Karu. Adhinarayanan	1	165
Viduthalai Tamil Puligal Katchi			Kudanthai Arasan	1	165
Makkal Arasu Katchi			S. Rajinikanth alias Arunmozhi Varman	1	165
Desiya Murpokku Dravida Kazhagam			Vijayakanth	60	
Social Democratic Party of India			V. M. S. Mohamed Mubarak	6	
All India Majlis-e-Ittehadul Muslimeen			T. S. Vakeel Ahmed	3	
Total				234	

=== MNM-Led Alliance ===
MNM-led Alliance
Party	Flag	Symbol	Leader	Contesting seats
Makkal Needhi Maiam			Kamal Haasan	140
All India Samathuva Makkal Katchi			R. Sarathkumar	33
Tamilaga Makkal Jananayaka Katchi			K.M. Shareef	9
Jananayaka Dravidia Munnetra kazhgam				8
Janata Dal (Secular)			H. D. Deve Gowda	3
Kalappai Makkal Iyakkam			P. T. Selvakumar	1
Indiya Jananayaka Katchi			T. R. Paarivendhar	40
Total				234

=== Others ===
Party	Flag	Symbol	Leader	Contesting seats
Naam Tamilar Katchi			Seeman	234
Bahujan Samaj Party			K. Armstrong	162
Puthiya Tamilagam			K. Krishnasamy	60
Communist Party of India (Marxist-Leninist) Liberation			Dipankar Bhattacharya	12
Samata Party			Uday Mandal	1

== Alliance-wise contest ==
Note: As per the official party and symbol on which candidates contest in the respective seats.

Parties
Parties		AIADMK+		
Parties		AIADMK	BJP	PMK
SPA				
SPA	DMK	156	14	18
SPA	INC	17	5	3
SPA	VCK	5	—N/a	1
SPA	CPI(M)	5	—N/a	1
SPA	CPI	5	1	—N/a
SPA	IUML	3	—N/a	—N/a
Total		234		

== Candidates ==
Candidates from recognized parties contested in 234 constituencies on 6 April. The Indian National Congress candidate for Srivilliputhur Assembly constituency, P. S. W. Madhava Rao, died on 11 April 2021 after testing positive for COVID-19.

=== List of Candidates from Prominent Parties ===
District	Constituency		DMK+		AIADMK+	
District	#	Name	Party	Candidate	Party	Candidate
Tiruvallur	1	Gummidipoondi	DMK	T. J. Govindrajan	PMK	M. Prakash
Tiruvallur	2	Ponneri	INC	Durai Chandrasekar	ADMK	P. Balaraman
Tiruvallur	3	Tiruttani	DMK	S. Chandran	ADMK	G. Hari
Tiruvallur	4	Thiruvallur	DMK	V. G. Raajendran	ADMK	B. V. Ramanaa
Tiruvallur	5	Poonamallee	DMK	A. Krishnaswamy	PMK	S. X. Rajamannar
Tiruvallur	6	Avadi	DMK	S. M. Nasar	ADMK	K. Pandiarajan
Chennai	7	Maduravoyal	DMK	K. Ganapathy	ADMK	P. Benjamin
Chennai	8	Ambattur	DMK	Joseph Samuel	ADMK	V. Alexander
Chennai	9	Madavaram	DMK	S. Sudharsanam	ADMK	V. Moorthy
Chennai	10	Thiruvottiyur	DMK	K. P. Shankar	ADMK	K. Kuppan
Chennai	11	Dr. R. K. Nagar	DMK	J. John Ebenezer	ADMK	R. S. Raajesh
Chennai	12	Perambur	DMK	R. D. Shekar	ADMK	N.R. Dhanapalan (Note: Perunthalaivar Makkal Katchi contested using the All India Anna Dravida Munnetra Kazhagam (AIADMK) “Two Leaves” symbol, the ECI will officially record them as AIADMK candidates in its electoral records.)
Chennai	13	Kolathur	DMK	M. K. Stalin	ADMK	Aadi Rajaram
Chennai	14	Villivakkam	DMK	A. Vetriazhagan	ADMK	J. C. D. Prabhakar
Chennai	15	Thiru-Vi-Ka-Nagar	DMK	P. Sivakumar	ADMK	P. L. Kalyani (Note: Tamil Maanila Congress (Moopanar) contested on the "Two Leaves" symbol of the All India Anna Dravida Munnetra Kazhagam (AIADMK), and is officially recorded as a AIADMK candidate in electoral records.)
Chennai	16	Egmore	DMK	I. Paranthamen	ADMK	B. John Pandian (Note: Tamizhaga Makkal Munnetra Kazhagam contested using the All India Anna Dravida Munnetra Kazhagam (AIADMK) “Two Leaves” symbol, the ECI will officially record them as AIADMK candidate in its electoral records.)
Chennai	17	Royapuram	DMK	Idream R. Murthy	ADMK	D. Jayakumar
Chennai	18	Harbour	DMK	P. K. Sekar Babu	BJP	Vinoj P. Selvam
Chennai	19	Chepauk-Thiruvallikeni	DMK	Udhayanidhi Stalin	PMK	A. V. A. Kassali
Chennai	20	Thousand Lights	DMK	Ezhilan Naganathan	BJP	Khushbu Sundar
Chennai	21	Anna Nagar	DMK	M. K. Mohan	ADMK	S. Gokula Indira
Chennai	22	Virugampakkam	DMK	Prabhakara Raja	ADMK	Virugai V. N. Ravi
Chennai	23	Saidapet	DMK	Ma. Subramanian	ADMK	Saidai Duraisamy
Chennai	24	Thiyagarayanagar	DMK	J. Karunanithi	ADMK	B. Sathiyanaarayanan
Chennai	25	Mylapore	DMK	Dha. Velu	ADMK	R. Nataraj
Chennai	26	Velachery	INC	Aassan Maulaana	ADMK	M. K. Ashok
Chennai	27	Sholinganallur	DMK	S. Aravind Ramesh	ADMK	K. P. Kandan
Chennai	28	Alandur	DMK	T. M. Anbarasan	ADMK	B. Valarmathi
Kanchipuram	29	Sriperumbudur	INC	K. Selvaperunthagai	ADMK	Palani
Chengalpattu	30	Pallavaram	DMK	I. Karunanithi	ADMK	S. Rajendran
Chengalpattu	31	Tambaram	DMK	S. R. Raja	ADMK	T. K. M. Chinnayya
Chengalpattu	32	Chengalpattu	DMK	M. Varalakshmi	ADMK	M. Gajendran
Chengalpattu	33	Thiruporur	VCK	S. S. Balaji	PMK	K. Arumugam
Chengalpattu	34	Cheyyur	VCK	M. Babu	ADMK	S. Kanitha
Chengalpattu	35	Madurantakam	DMK	C. E. Sathya (Note: Marumalarchi Dravida Munnetra Kazhagam contested on the "Rising Sun" symbol of the Dravida Munnetra Kazhagam (DMK), and is officially recorded as a DMK candidate in electoral records.)	ADMK	K. Maragatham
Kanchipuram	36	Uthiramerur	DMK	K. Sundar	ADMK	V. Somasundaram
Kanchipuram	37	Kancheepuram	DMK	Ezhilarasan	PMK	P. Magesh Kumar
Ranipet	38	Arakkonam	VCK	J. Gowthama Sannah	ADMK	S. Ravi
Ranipet	39	Sholinghur	INC	A. M. Munirathinam	PMK	A. M. Krishnan
Vellore	40	Katpadi	DMK	Durai Murugan	ADMK	V. Ramu
Ranipet	41	Ranipet	DMK	R. Gandhi	ADMK	S. M. Sugumar
Ranipet	42	Arcot	DMK	J. L. Eswarappan	PMK	K. L. Elavazagan
Vellore	43	Vellore	DMK	P. Karthikeyan	ADMK	S. R. K. Appu
Vellore	44	Anaikattu	DMK	A. P. Nandakumar	ADMK	D. Velazhagan
Vellore	45	Kilvaithinankuppam	DMK	K. Seetharaman	ADMK	M. Jagan Moorthy (Note: Puratchi Bharatham Katchi contested using the All India Anna Dravida Munnetra Kazhagam (AIADMK) “Two Leaves” symbol, the ECI will officially record them as AIADMK candidate in its electoral records.)
Vellore	46	Gudiyattam	DMK	V. Amulu	ADMK	G. Paritha
Tirupathur	47	Vaniyambadi	IUML	Mohd. Nayeem	ADMK	G. Sendhil Kumar
Tirupathur	48	Ambur	DMK	A. C. Vilwanathan	ADMK	K. Nazar Mohamed
Tirupathur	49	Jolarpet	DMK	K. Devaraji	ADMK	K. C. Veeramani
Tirupathur	50	Tirupattur	DMK	A. Nallathambi	PMK	T. K. Raja
Krishnagiri	51	Uthangarai	INC	S. Arumugam	ADMK	T. M. Tamilselvam
Krishnagiri	52	Bargur	DMK	D. Mathiazhagan	ADMK	A. Krishnan
Krishnagiri	53	Krishnagiri	DMK	T. Senguttuvan	ADMK	K. Ashok Kumar
Krishnagiri	54	Veppanahalli	DMK	P. Murugan	ADMK	K. P. Munusamy
Krishnagiri	55	Hosur	DMK	Y. Prakaash	ADMK	S. Jyothi
Krishnagiri	56	Thalli	CPI	T. Ramachandran	BJP	C. Nagesh Kumar
Dharmapuri	57	Palacode	DMK	P. K. Murugan	ADMK	K. P. Anbalagan
Dharmapuri	58	Pennagaram	DMK	Inbasekharan	PMK	G. K. Mani
Dharmapuri	59	Dharmapuri	DMK	P. Subramani	PMK	S. P. Venkateshwaran
Dharmapuri	60	Pappireddipatti	DMK	M. Prabhu R.	ADMK	A. Govindasamy
Dharmapuri	61	Harur	CPI(M)	A. Kumar	ADMK	V. Sampathkumar
Tiruvannamalai	62	Chengam	DMK	M. P. Giri	ADMK	M. S. Nainakannu
Tiruvannamalai	63	Tiruvannamalai	DMK	E. V. Velu	BJP	S. Thanigaivel
Tiruvannamalai	64	Kilpennathur	DMK	K. Pitchandi	PMK	K. Selvakumar
Tiruvannamalai	65	Kalasapakkam	DMK	P. S. T. Saravanan	ADMK	V. Panneerselvam
Tiruvannamalai	66	Polur	DMK	K. V. Sekaran	ADMK	Agri S. S. Krishnamurthy
Tiruvannamalai	67	Arani	DMK	S. S. Anbalagan	ADMK	S. Ramachandran
Tiruvannamalai	68	Cheyyar	DMK	O. Jothi	ADMK	K. Dusi Mohan
Tiruvannamalai	69	Vandavasi	DMK	S. Ambethkumar	PMK	S. Murali
Viluppuram	70	Gingee	DMK	K. S. Masthan	PMK	P. Rajendiran
Viluppuram	71	Mailam	DMK	R. Masilamani	PMK	C. Sivakumar
Viluppuram	72	Tindivanam	DMK	P. Seethapathy	ADMK	P. Arjunan
Viluppuram	73	Vanur	VCK	Vanni Arasu	ADMK	M. Chakrapani
Viluppuram	74	Villupuram	DMK	R. Lakshmanan	ADMK	C. V. Shanmugam
Viluppuram	75	Vikravandi	DMK	N. Pugazhenthi	ADMK	R. Muthamilselvan
Viluppuram	76	Tirukkoyilur	DMK	K. Ponmudy	BJP	V. A. T. Kalivaradhan
Kallakurichi	77	Ulundurpettai	DMK	A. J. Manikannan	ADMK	R. Kumaraguru
Kallakurichi	78	Rishivandiyam	DMK	K. Karthikeyan	ADMK	S. A. Santhosh
Kallakurichi	79	Sankarapuram	DMK	T. Udhayasuriyan	PMK	Dr. G. Raja
Kallakurichi	80	Kallakurichi	INC	K. I. Manirathinem	ADMK	M. Senthilkumar
Salem	81	Gangavalli	DMK	J. Rekha P.	ADMK	A. Nallathambi
Salem	82	Attur	DMK	K. Chinnadurai	ADMK	A. P. Jayasankaran
Salem	83	Yercaud	DMK	C. Tamilselvan	ADMK	G. Chitra
Salem	84	Omalur	INC	R. M. Kumaramangalam	ADMK	R. Mani
Salem	85	Mettur	DMK	S. Srinivasaperumal	PMK	S. Sadhasivam
Salem	86	Edappadi	DMK	T. Sambathkumar	ADMK	Edappadi K. Palaniswami
Salem	87	Sankari	DMK	K. M. Rajesh	ADMK	S. Sundararajan
Salem	88	Salem (West)	DMK	A. Rajendran	PMK	Arul Ramadas
Salem	89	Salem (North)	DMK	R. Rajendran	ADMK	G. Venkatachalam
Salem	90	Salem (South)	DMK	A. S. Saravanan	ADMK	E. Balasubramanian
Salem	91	Veerapandi	DMK	A. K. Tharun	ADMK	M. Rajamuthu
Namakkal	92	Rasipuram	DMK	M. Mathiventhan	ADMK	V. Saroja
Namakkal	93	Senthamangalam	DMK	K. Ponnusamy	ADMK	S. Chandran
Namakkal	94	Namakkal	DMK	P. Ramalingam	ADMK	K. P. P. Baskar
Namakkal	95	Paramathi-Velur	DMK	K. S. Moorthiy	ADMK	S. Sekar
Namakkal	96	Tiruchengodu	DMK	E. R. Eswaran (Note: Kongunadu Makkal Desia Katchi contested on the "Rising Sun" symbol of the Dravida Munnetra Kazhagam (DMK), and is officially recorded as a DMK candidate in electoral records.)	ADMK	Pon. Saraswathi
Namakkal	97	Kumarapalayam	DMK	M. Venkatachalam	ADMK	P. Thangamani
Erode	98	Erode (East)	INC	Thirumagan Evera	ADMK	M. Yuvaraja
Erode	99	Erode (West)	DMK	S. Muthusamy	ADMK	K. V. Ramalingam
Erode	100	Modakkurichi	DMK	S. Jagadeesan	BJP	C. Saraswathi
Tiruppur	101	Dharapuram	DMK	N. Kayalvizhi	BJP	L. Murugan
Tiruppur	102	Kangayam	DMK	M. P. Saminathan	ADMK	A. S. Ramalingam
Erode	103	Perundurai	DMK	K. K. C. Balu	ADMK	S. Jayakumar
Erode	104	Bhavani	DMK	K. P. Durairaj	ADMK	K. C. Karuppannan
Erode	105	Anthiyur	DMK	A. G. Venkatachalam	ADMK	K. S. Shanmugavel
Erode	106	Gobichettipalayam	DMK	G. V. Manimaran	ADMK	K. A. Sengottaiyan
Erode	107	Bhavanisagar	CPI	P. L. Sundaram	ADMK	A. Bannari
Nilgiris	108	Udhagamandalam	INC	R. Ganesh	BJP	M. Bhojarajan
Nilgiris	109	Gudalur	DMK	S. Kasilingam	ADMK	Pon Jayaseelan
Nilgiris	110	Coonoor	DMK	K. Ramachandran	ADMK	D. Vinoth
Coimbatore	111	Mettuppalayam	DMK	Shanmuga Sundaram	ADMK	A. K. Selvaraj
Tiruppur	112	Avanashi	DMK	Athiyamaan Raju (Note: Aathi Thamizhar Peravai contested on the "Rising Sun" symbol of the Dravida Munnetra Kazhagam (DMK), and is officially recorded as a DMK candidate in electoral records.)	ADMK	P. Dhanapal
Tiruppur	113	Tiruppur (North)	CPI	M. Ravi Subramanian	ADMK	K. N. Vijayakumar
Tiruppur	114	Tiruppur (South)	DMK	K. Selvaraj	ADMK	S. Gunasekaran
Tiruppur	115	Palladam	DMK	K. Muthurathinam	ADMK	M. S. M. Anandan
Coimbatore	116	Sulur	DMK	M. Selvam Kalichamy	ADMK	V. P. Kandasamy
Coimbatore	117	Kavundampalayam	DMK	R. Krishnan	ADMK	G. Arunkumar
Coimbatore	118	Coimbatore (North)	DMK	V. M. Shanmuga	ADMK	Amman K. Arjunan
Coimbatore	119	Thondamuthur	DMK	Karthikeya	ADMK	S. P. Velumani
Coimbatore	120	Coimbatore (South)	INC	S. Jayakumar Mayura	BJP	Vanathi Srinivasan
Coimbatore	121	Singanallur	DMK	N. Karthik	ADMK	K. R. Jayaram
Coimbatore	122	Kinathukadavu	DMK	Kuruchi Prabhakaran	ADMK	S. Damodaran
Coimbatore	123	Pollachi	DMK	K. Varadharajan	ADMK	V. Jayaraman
Coimbatore	124	Valparai	CPI	M. Arumugham	ADMK	T. K. Amulkandasami
Tiruppur	125	Udumalaipettai	INC	K. Thennarasu	ADMK	K. Radhakrishnan
Tiruppur	126	Madathukulam	DMK	R. Jayaramakrishnan	ADMK	C. Mahendran
Dindigul	127	Palani	DMK	I. P. Senthil Kumar	ADMK	K. Ravi Manoharan
Dindigul	128	Oddanchatram	DMK	R. Sakkarapani	ADMK	N. P. Nataraj
Dindigul	129	Athoor	DMK	I. Periyasamy	PMK	M. Thilagabama
Dindigul	130	Nilakkottai	DMK	K. Murugavelrajan (Note: Makkal Viduthalai Katchi contested on the "Rising Sun" symbol of the Dravida Munnetra Kazhagam (DMK), and is officially recorded as a DMK candidate in electoral records.)	ADMK	S. Thenmozhi
Dindigul	131	Natham	DMK	M. A. Andi Ambalam	ADMK	Natham R. Viswanathan
Dindigul	132	Dindigul	CPI(M)	N. Pandi	ADMK	Dindigul C. Sreenivasan
Dindigul	133	Vedasandur	DMK	S. Gandhirajan	ADMK	V. P. B. Paramasivam
Karur	134	Aravakurichi	DMK	R. Elango	BJP	K. Annamalai
Karur	135	Karur	DMK	V. Senthil Balaji	ADMK	M. R. Vijayabhaskar
Karur	136	Krishnarayapuram	DMK	K. Sivagama Sundari	ADMK	Muthukumar
Karur	137	Kulithalai	DMK	R. Manickam	ADMK	N. R. Chandrasekar
Tiruchirappalli	138	Manapparai	DMK	P. Abdul Samad (Note: Manithaneya Makkal Katchi contested on the "Rising Sun" symbol of the Dravida Munnetra Kazhagam (DMK), and is officially recorded as a DMK candidate in electoral records.)	ADMK	R. Chandrasekar
Tiruchirappalli	139	Srirangam	DMK	M. Palaniyandi	ADMK	Ku. Pa. Krishnan
Tiruchirappalli	140	Tiruchirappalli (West)	DMK	K. N. Nehru	ADMK	V. Padmanathan
Tiruchirappalli	141	Tiruchirappalli (East)	DMK	Inigo S. Irudayaraj	ADMK	V. N. Natarajan
Tiruchirappalli	142	Thiruverumbur	DMK	A. M. Poyyamozhi	ADMK	P. Kumar
Tiruchirappalli	143	Lalgudi	DMK	A. Soundara Pandian	ADMK	D. R. Dharmaraj
Tiruchirappalli	144	Manachanallur	DMK	S. Kathiravan	ADMK	M. Paranjothi
Tiruchirappalli	145	Musiri	DMK	N. Thiyagarajan	ADMK	M. Selvarasu
Tiruchirappalli	146	Thuraiyur	DMK	S. Stalinkumar	ADMK	T. Indragandhi
Perambalur	147	Perambalur	DMK	M. Prabhakaran	ADMK	R. Thamizhselvan
Perambalur	148	Kunnam	DMK	S. S. Sivasankar	ADMK	R. T. Ramachandran
Ariyalur	149	Ariyalur	DMK	K. Chinnappa	ADMK	S. Rajendran
Ariyalur	150	Jayankondam	DMK	Ka. So. Ka. Kannan	PMK	K. Balu
Cuddalore	151	Tittakudi	DMK	C. V. Ganesan	BJP	D. Periyasamy
Cuddalore	152	Vriddhachalam	INC	R. Radhakrishnan	PMK	J. Karthikeyan
Cuddalore	153	Neyveli	DMK	Saba Rajendran	PMK	K. Jagan
Cuddalore	154	Panruti	DMK	T. Velmurugan (Note: Tamizhaga Vazhvurimai Katchi contested on the "Rising Sun" symbol of the Dravida Munnetra Kazhagam (DMK), and is officially recorded as a DMK candidate in electoral records.)	ADMK	R. Rajendran
Cuddalore	155	Cuddalore	DMK	G. Iyappan	ADMK	M. C. Sampath
Cuddalore	156	Kurinjipadi	DMK	M. R. K. Panneerselvam	ADMK	Selvi Ramajayam
Cuddalore	157	Bhuvanagiri	DMK	K. Durai Saravanan	ADMK	A. Arunmozhithevan
Cuddalore	158	Chidambaram	IUML	S. Abdul Rahman	ADMK	K. A. Pandian
Cuddalore	159	Kattumannarkoil	VCK	M. Sinthanai Selvan	ADMK	N. Murugumaran
Mayiladuthurai	160	Sirkazhi	DMK	M. Panneerselvam	ADMK	P. V. Bharathi
Mayiladuthurai	161	Mayiladuthurai	INC	S. Rajakumar	PMK	A. Palanisamy
Mayiladuthurai	162	Poompuhar	DMK	Nivedha M. Murugan	ADMK	S. Pavunraj
Nagapattinam	163	Nagapattinam	VCK	Aloor Shanavas	ADMK	Thanka Kathiravan
Nagapattinam	164	Kilvelur	CPI(M)	V. P. Nagaimaali	PMK	S. Vadivel Ravanan
Nagapattinam	165	Vedaranyam	DMK	S. K. Vedarathinam	ADMK	O. S. Manian
Tiruvarur	166	Thiruthuraipoondi	CPI	K. Marimuthu	ADMK	C. Suresh Kumar
Tiruvarur	167	Mannargudi	DMK	T. R. B. Rajaa	ADMK	Siva Rajamanickam
Tiruvarur	168	Thiruvarur	DMK	K. Poondi Kalaivanan	ADMK	A. N. R. Panneerselvam
Tiruvarur	169	Nannilam	DMK	S. Jothiraman	ADMK	R. Kamaraj
Thanjavur	170	Thiruvidaimarudur	DMK	Govi. Chezhian	ADMK	S. Union Veeramani
Thanjavur	171	Kumbakonam	DMK	G. Anbalagan	ADMK	G. M. Srithar Vandayar (Note: Moovendar Munnetra Kazhagam contested using the All India Anna Dravida Munnetra Kazhagam (AIADMK) “Two Leaves” symbol, the ECI will officially record them as AIADMK candidate in its electoral records.)
Thanjavur	172	Papanasam	DMK	M. H. Jawahirullah	ADMK	K. Gopinathan
Thanjavur	173	Thiruvaiyaru	DMK	Durai Chandrasekaran	BJP	S. Venkatesan
Thanjavur	174	Thanjavur	DMK	T. K. G. Neelamegam	ADMK	V. Arivudainambi
Thanjavur	175	Orathanadu	DMK	M. Ramachandran	ADMK	R. Vaithilingam
Thanjavur	176	Pattukkottai	DMK	K. Annadurai	ADMK	N. R. Rengarajan
Thanjavur	177	Peravurani	DMK	N. Ashokkumar	ADMK	S. V. T. Sambandam
Pudukkottai	178	Gandarvakkottai	CPI(M)	M. Chinnadurai	ADMK	S. Jayabharathi
Pudukkottai	179	Viralimalai	DMK	Palaniappan	ADMK	C. Vijayabaskar
Pudukkottai	180	Pudukkottai	DMK	V. Muthuraja	ADMK	V. R. Karthik
Pudukkottai	181	Thirumayam	DMK	S. Regupathy	ADMK	P. K. Vairamuthu
Pudukkottai	182	Alangudi	DMK	Meyyanathan Siva V	ADMK	Dharma Thangavel
Pudukkottai	183	Aranthangi	INC	T. Ramachandran	ADMK	M. Rajanayagam
Sivaganga	184	Karaikudi	INC	S. Mangudi	BJP	H. Raja
Sivaganga	185	Tiruppattur	DMK	K. R. Periyakaruppan	ADMK	Marudhu Alaguraj
Sivaganga	186	Sivaganga	CPI	S. Gunasekaran	ADMK	P. R. Senthilnathan
Sivaganga	187	Manamadurai	DMK	A. Tamilarasi	ADMK	S. Nagarajan
Madurai	188	Melur	INC	T. Ravichandran	ADMK	P. Selvam
Madurai	189	Madurai East	DMK	P. Moorthy	ADMK	R. Gopalakrishnan
Madurai	190	Sholavandan	DMK	A. Venkatesan	ADMK	K. Manickam
Madurai	191	Madurai North	DMK	G. Thalapathi	BJP	P. Saravanan
Madurai	192	Madurai South	DMK	M. Boominathan	ADMK	S. S. Saravanan
Madurai	193	Madurai Central	DMK	P. Thiaga Rajan	ADMK	N. Jothi M. (Note: Pasumpon Desiya Kazhagam contested using the All India Anna Dravida Munnetra Kazhagam (AIADMK) “Two Leaves” symbol, the ECI will officially record them as AIADMK candidate in its electoral records.)
Madurai	194	Madurai West	DMK	C. Chinnammal	ADMK	Sellur K. Raju
Madurai	195	Thiruparankundram	CPI(M)	Ponnuthai	ADMK	V. V. Rajan Chellappa
Madurai	196	Thirumangalam	DMK	M. Manimaran	ADMK	R. B. Udhayakumar
Madurai	197	Usilampatti	DMK	P. V. Kathiravan (Note: All India Forward Bloc contested on the "Rising Sun" symbol of the Dravida Munnetra Kazhagam (DMK), and is officially recorded as a DMK candidate in electoral records.)	ADMK	P. Ayyappan
Theni	198	Andipatti	DMK	A. Maharajan	ADMK	A. Logirajan
Theni	199	Periyakulam	DMK	K. S. Saravana Kumar	ADMK	M. Murugan
Theni	200	Bodinayakanur	DMK	Thanga Tamil Selvan	ADMK	O. Panneerselvam
Theni	201	Cumbum	DMK	N. Eramakrishnan	ADMK	S. P. M. Syed Khan
Virudhunagar	202	Rajapalayam	DMK	S. Thanga Pandian	ADMK	K. T. Rajenthra Bhalaji
Virudhunagar	203	Srivilliputhur	INC	P. S. W. Madhavarao	ADMK	E. M. Manraj
Virudhunagar	204	Sattur	DMK	A. R. R. Raghuraman	ADMK	R. K. Ravichandhran
Virudhunagar	205	Sivakasi	INC	A. M. S. G. Ashokan	ADMK	Lakshmi Ganesan
Virudhunagar	206	Virudhunagar	DMK	A. R. R. Seenivasan	BJP	G. Pandurangan
Virudhunagar	207	Aruppukkottai	DMK	Ramachandran	ADMK	Vaigaichelvan
Virudhunagar	208	Tiruchuli	DMK	Thangam Thennarasu	ADMK	S. Rajasekar (Note: All India Moovendar Munnani Kazhagam contested using the All India Anna Dravida Munnetra Kazhagam (AIADMK) “Two Leaves” symbol, the ECI will officially record them as AIADMK candidate in its electoral records.)
Ramanathapuram	209	Paramakudi	DMK	S. Murugesan	ADMK	N. Sadhan Prabhakar
Ramanathapuram	210	Tiruvadanai	INC	R. M. Karumanikam	ADMK	K. C. Animuthu
Ramanathapuram	211	Ramanathapuram	DMK	K. Muthuramalingam	BJP	D. Kuppuramu
Ramanathapuram	212	Mudhukulathur	DMK	Raja Kannappan	ADMK	Keerthika Muniyasamy
Thoothukudi	213	Vilathikulam	DMK	G. V. Markandayan	ADMK	P. Chinnappan
Thoothukudi	214	Thoothukkudi	DMK	P. Geetha Jeevan	ADMK	S. D. R. Vijayaseelan
Thoothukudi	215	Tiruchendur	DMK	A. R. Radhakrishnan	ADMK	M. Radhakrishnan
Thoothukudi	216	Srivaikuntam	INC	Oorvasi S. Amirtharaj	ADMK	S. P. Shunmuganathan
Thoothukudi	217	Ottapidaram	DMK	M. C. Shunmugaiah	ADMK	P. Mohan
Thoothukudi	218	Kovilpatti	CPI(M)	K. Srinivasan	ADMK	Kadambur Raju
Tenkasi	219	Sankarankovil	DMK	E. Raja	ADMK	V. M. Rajalakshmi
Tenkasi	220	Vasudevanallur	DMK	T. S. Tirumalaikumar	ADMK	A. Manoharan
Tenkasi	221	Kadayanallur	IUML	Mhd. Abubacker	ADMK	C. Krishnamurali
Tenkasi	222	Tenkasi	INC	S. Palani Nadar	ADMK	S. S. Pandian
Tenkasi	223	Alangulam	DMK	Poongothai Aladi Aruna	ADMK	P. H. Manoj Pandian
Tirunelveli	224	Tirunelveli	DMK	A. L. S. Lakshmanan	BJP	Nainar Nagendran
Tirunelveli	225	Ambasamudram	DMK	R. Avudaiappan	ADMK	Esakki Subaya
Tirunelveli	226	Palayamkottai	DMK	M. Abdul Wahab	ADMK	K. J. C. Jerald
Tirunelveli	227	Nanguneri	INC	Ruby R. Manoharan	ADMK	N. Ganesaraja
Tirunelveli	228	Radhapuram	DMK	M. Appavu	ADMK	I. S. Inbadurai
Kanyakumari	229	Kanniyakumari	DMK	S. Austin	ADMK	Thalavai N. Sundaram
Kanyakumari	230	Nagercoil	DMK	N. Suresh Rajan	BJP	M. R. Gandhi
Kanyakumari	231	Colachal	INC	J. G. Prince	BJP	P. Ramesh
Kanyakumari	232	Padmanabhapuram	DMK	Mano Thangaraj	ADMK	D. John Thankam
Kanyakumari	233	Vilavancode	INC	S. Vijayadharani	BJP	R. Jayaseelan
Kanyakumari	234	Killiyoor	INC	S. Rajeshkumar	ADMK	K. V. Jude Dev

== Campaigning ==
The DMK went on a campaign tour titled Vidiyalai Nokki Stalinin Kural, which began on 20 December 2020 at Thirukkuvalai, the birthplace of M. Karunanidhi. Palaniswami started the AIADMK's campaign at his hometown, Edappadi, on 19 December 2020. CM Palanisami also launched his "Vetrinadai Podum Tamilagam" campaign followed by "Thodarattu Vetrinadai" campaign.

BJP politician and the Chief Minister of Uttar Pradesh, Yogi Adityanath, addressed a public rally in Coimbatore in presence of K. Annamalai to support Vanathi Srinivasan on March 31, 2021. The BJP and the Hindu Munnani organized a bike rally where they shouted communal slogans. The BJP supporters also reportedly pelted stones at Muslim shops in the area. BJP candidate Vanathi Srinivasan described the stone-pelting incident as a minor incident while MNM president Kamal Haasan said that "riot specialists must be defeated through unity".

== Opinion polls ==
Election outcome projections as surveyed by various agencies prior to the election day
Date published	Polling agency				Lead	Slim margin
Date published	Polling agency	SPA	NDA	Others (Note: May include NTK and other parties not asked in survey)	Lead	Slim margin
04 Apr 21	Nakkheeran	172	22	–	150	40
02 Apr 21	Thanthi TV	124	52	–	72	58
02 Apr 21	Malai Murasu	151	54	0-2	97	27
31 Mar 21	Junior Vikatan	163	52	1	111	18
26 Mar 21	Patriotic Voter	143	82	0-9	61	18
24 Mar 21	MCV Network - Spick Media	158	74	02	84	
24 Mar 21	Times Now - CVoter	177	49	8	128	–
22 Mar 21	Puthiya Thalaimurai - APT	151 - 158	76 - 83	–	68- 82	–
15 Mar 21	ABP News - CVoter	161 - 169	53 - 61	1-18	100 - 116	–
8 Mar 21	Times Now- CVoter	158	65	–	88- 104	–
27 Feb 21	ABP News- CVoter	154 - 162	58 - 66	1 - 20	88- 104	–
18 Jan 21	ABP News- CVoter	158 - 166	60 - 68	2 - 14	90 - 106	–

== Voting ==
The state recorded 73.83% voter turnout, which is 1.18% lesser than the preceding 2016 election. Karur district recorded the highest voter turnout amongst the state's districts, with 83.92%. Chennai district turned out the lowest (59.06%).

=== Voter turnout by districts ===
#	District name	Percentage
1	Thiruvallur	70.56%
2	Chennai	59.06%
3	Kanchipuram	71.98%
4	Chengalpattu	68.18%
5	Ranipet	77.92%
6	Vellore	73.73%
7	Thirupattur	77.33%
8	Krishnagiri	77.30%
9	Dharmapuri	82.35%
10	Thiruvannamalai	78.62%
11	Villupuram	78.56%
12	Kallakurichi	80.14%
13	Salem	79.22%
14	Namakkal	79.72%
15	Erode	77.07%
16	Tiruppur	70.12%
17	Nilgris	69.68%
18	Coimbatore	68.70%
19	Dindigul	77.13%
20	Karur	83.92%
21	Thiruchirapalli	73.79%
22	Perambalur	79.09%
23	Ariyalur	82.47%
24	Cuddalore	76.50%
25	Nagapattinam	65.48%
26	Thiruvarur	76.53%
27	Thanjavur	74.13%
28	Pudukottai	76.41%
29	Sivaganga	68.94%
30	Madurai	70.33%
31	Theni	71.75%
32	Virudhunagar	73.77%
33	Ramanathapuram	69.60%
34	Thoothukudi	70.20%
35	Tenkasi	72.63%
36	Tirunelveli	66.65%
37	Kanniyakumari	68.67%

=== Repoll ===
The Election Commission of India, on 13 April 2021, declared the polling held at the polling station No. 92 in the Velachery Assembly constituency "void" under 58 (1)(b) of the Representation of the People Act, 1951. The commission ordered a repoll in the station on the basis of a report submitted by the returning officers and observers. Fresh voting was conducted on 17 April 2021 between 7 am and 7 pm IST. The repoll follows the suspension of three Greater Chennai Corporation officials for transporting two EVMs and one VVPAT machine of booth number 92 on a two-wheeler in the Velachery-Tharamani road.

== Exit polls ==
The Election Commission on March 24, banned the publication of any exit poll from 27 March till 7:30 PM of 29 April to prevent any influence on voters in the general election of West Bengal and by-elections in other states. On April 26, the ban period was advanced to 7:00 PM.

Election outcome projections as surveyed by agencies after the election day
Date published	Polling agency				Lead	Slim margin
Date published	Polling agency	SPA	NDA	Others	Lead	Slim margin
29 Apr 21	Republic TV - CNX	160 - 170	58 - 68	0 - 8	92 - 112	–
29 Apr 21	ABP/Times Now - CVoter	160 - 172	58 - 70	0 - 9	90 - 114	–
29 Apr 21	India Today - Axis My India	175 - 195	38 - 54	1 - 7	121 - 157	–
29 Apr 21	India Ahead - P MARQ	165 - 190	40 - 65	2 - 9	100 - 150	–
29 Apr 21	News24 - Today's Chanakya	164 - 186	46 - 68	0 - 6	96 - 140	–
29 Apr 21	TV9 - Polstrat	143 - 153	75 - 85	2 - 12	58 - 78	_
29 Apr 21	Shining India News	147 - 177	59 - 81	0 - 2	66 - 118	_
29 Apr 21	Patriotic Voter	153	74	7	72	–
29 Apr 21	Democracy Times Network	181 - 193	44 - 52	1 - 3	129 - 149	
29 Apr 21	SPICK NEWS - MCV Network	146	85	3	61	
29 Apr 21	Thanthi TV	133	68	–	65	33

== Results ==
The results were announced by the Election Commission of India on 2 May 2021, starting at 9 AM IST. The DMK won 133 constituencies on its own, receiving a simple majority in the sixteenth Tamil Nadu Legislative Assembly, whereas its SPA alliance saw victory in a total of 159 constituencies. Meanwhile, the NDA alliance captured 75 constituencies, out of which the AIADMK had won 66. Other parties, alliances, and independent candidates did not secure any seats. After spending a decade as the opposition party, the DMK won Tamil Nadu from the AIADMK, which reigned the state for two consecutive terms (2011–2021). The AIADMK assumed the position of the opposition party at the sixteenth Tamil Nadu Legislative Assembly.

Seats won by party
SPA	Seats	Change	NDA	Seats	Change
DMK	133	▲44	AIADMK	66	▼70
INC	18	▲10	BJP	4	▲4
VCK	4	▲4	PMK	5	▲5
CPI	2	▲2			
CPI(M)	2	▲2			
TOTAL	159	▲61	TOTAL	75	▼61

Alliance wise votes
Alliance	Votes	%
Secular Progressive Alliance	20,982,088	45.38%
National Democratic Alliance	18,363,499	39.71%
Non Alliance	6,919,189	14.9%

Results by alliance
1. SPA (45.4%)
2. NDA (39.7%)
3. Non Alliance (14.9%)

=== Popular vote ===
159
SPA
75
NDA

Alliance	Party	Votes			Seats		
Alliance	Party	Votes	%	±	Contested	Won	+/−
SPA	Dravida Munnetra Kazhagam	17,430,179	37.70	▲6.05	188	133	▲44
SPA	Indian National Congress	1,976,527	4.27	▼2.13	25	18	▲10
SPA	Communist Party of India	504,537	1.09	▲0.30	6	2	▲2
SPA	Viduthalai Chiruthaigal Katchi	457,763	0.99	▲0.20	6	4	▲4
SPA	Communist Party of India (Marxist)	390,819	0.85	▲0.13	6	2	▲2
SPA	Indian Union Muslim League	222,263	0.48	▼0.25	3	0	▼1
SPA	Total	20,982,088	45.38	▲5.91	234	159	▲61
NDA	All India Anna Dravida Munnetra Kazhagam	15,391,055	33.29	▼7.58	191	66	▼70
NDA	Pattali Makkal Katchi	1,758,774	3.80	▼1.52	23	5	▲5
NDA	Bharatiya Janata Party	1,213,670	2.62	▼0.24	20	4	▲4
NDA	Total	18,363,499	39.71	▼1.16 (Note: AIADMK+ Alliance secured 40.88% of votes in the 2016 Tamil Nadu Legislative Assembly election.)	234	75	▼61
Others		6,573,598	14.23	Steady	3,530	0	Steady
None of the above		345,591	0.75	▼0.55	–	0	Steady
Total		46,236,716	100.00	—	3998	234	±0
Valid votes		46,236,716	99.77				
Invalid votes		107,874	0.23				
Votes cast / turnout		46,344,590	73.63				
Abstentions		16,599,103	26.37				
Registered voters		62,943,693					

1. SPA (45.4%)
2. NDA (39.7%)
3. Others (14.9%)

=== By district ===
Number of seats secured by the alliances in each district of Tamil Nadu (Note: Numbers of constituencies in Chennai, Thiruvallur, Kancheepuram, Chengalpattu, Vellore, Ranipet, Thirupathur, Villupuram, Kallakurichi, Nagapattinam, Mayiladuthurai, Tirunelveli and Tenkasi districts adjusted as per their new boundaries before the election.)
District	Seats		
District	Seats	SPA	NDA
Thiruvallur	6	6	—N/a
Chennai	22	22	—N/a
Kancheepuram	3	3	—N/a
Chengalpattu	6	5	1
Ranipet	4	3	1
Vellore	5	4	1
Thirupattur	4	3	1
Krishnagiri	6	3	3
Dharmapuri	5	—N/a	5
Thiruvanamalai	8	6	2
Villupuram	7	4	3
Kallakurichi	4	3	1
Salem	11	1	10
Namakkal	6	4	2
Erode	8	3	5
Nilgiris	3	2	1
Thiruppur	8	3	5
Coimbatore	10	—N/a	10
Dindigul	7	4	3
Karur	4	4	—N/a
Tiruchirapalli	9	9	—N/a
Perambalur	2	2	—N/a
Ariyalur	2	2	—N/a
Cuddalore	9	7	2
Mayiladuthurai	3	3	—N/a
Nagapattinam	3	2	1
Thiruvarur	4	3	1
Thanjavur	8	7	1
Pudukottai	6	5	1
Sivaganga	4	3	1
Madurai	10	5	5
Theni	4	3	1
Virudhunagar	7	6	1
Ramanathapuram	4	4	—N/a
Thoothukudi	6	5	1
Tenkasi	5	3	2
Tirunelveli	5	3	2
Kanyakumari	6	4	2
Total	234	159	75

=== By Region ===
Alliance-wise Results
Region	Total Seats	Secular Progressive Alliance	National Democratic Alliance
Northern Tamil Nadu	69	59 / 69 (86%)	10 / 69 (14%)
Western Tamil Nadu	68	24 / 68 (35%)	44 / 68 (65%)
Southern Tamil Nadu	51	36 / 51 (71%)	15 / 51 (29%)
Central Tamil Nadu	46	40 / 46 (87%)	6 / 46 (13%)

=== By constituency ===
District	Constituency			Winner				Runner Up				Margin
District	No.	Name	%	Candidate	Party	Votes	%	Candidate	Party	Votes	%	Margin
Thiruvallur	1	Gummidipoondi	78.84	T. J. Govindrajan	DMK	126,452	56.94	Prakash M	PMK	75,514	34.00	50,938
Thiruvallur	2	Ponneri (SC)	78.68	Durai Chandrasekar	INC	94,528	44.94	P. Balaraman	ADMK	84,839	40.33	9,689
Thiruvallur	3	Tiruttani	79.85	S. Chandran	DMK	120,314	51.72	G. Hari	ADMK	91,061	39.15	29,253
Thiruvallur	4	Thiruvallur	77.91	V. G. Raajendran	DMK	107,709	50.27	B. V. Ramanaa	ADMK	85,008	39.68	22,701
Thiruvallur	5	Poonamallee (SC)	73.62	A. Krishnaswamy	DMK	149,578	56.72	S. X. Rajamannar	PMK	55,468	21.03	94,110
Thiruvallur	6	Avadi	67.96	S. M. Nasar	DMK	150,287	49.94	K. Pandiarajan	ADMK	95,012	31.57	55,275
Chennai	7	Maduravoyal	60.56	K. Ganapathy	DMK	121,298	44.29	P. Benjamin	ADMK	89,577	32.71	31,721
Chennai	8	Ambattur	62.52	Joseph Samuel	DMK	114,554	47.67	V. Alexander	ADMK	72,408	30.13	42,146
Chennai	9	Madavaram	66.60	S. Sudharsanam	DMK	151,485	50.04	V. Moorthy	ADMK	94,414	31.19	57,071
Chennai	10	Thiruvottiyur	65.36	K. P. Shankar	DMK	88,185	44.34	K. Kuppan	ADMK	50,524	25.40	37,661
Chennai	11	Dr. Radhakrishnan Nagar	71.12	J. John Ebenezer	DMK	95,763	51.20	R. S. Raajesh	ADMK	53,284	28.49	42,479
Chennai	12	Perambur	63.43	R. D. Sekar	DMK	105,267	52.53	N. R. Dhanapalan	ADMK	50,291	25.10	54,976
Chennai	13	Kolathur	61.66	M. K. Stalin	DMK	105,522	60.86	Aadhi Rajaram	ADMK	35,138	20.27	70,384
Chennai	14	Villivakkam	56.43	A. Vetriazhagan	DMK	76,127	52.83	J. C. D. Prabhakar	ADMK	38,890	26.99	37,237
Chennai	15	Thiru-Vi-Ka-Nagar (SC)	60.93	P. Sivakumar	DMK	81,727	61.13	P. L. Kalyani	ADMK	26,714	19.98	55,013
Chennai	16	Egmore (SC)	61.75	I. Paranthamen	DMK	68,832	57.71	B. John Pandian	ADMK	30,064	25.21	38,768
Chennai	17	Royapuram	62.91	Idream R. Murthy	DMK	64,424	53.16	D. Jayakumar	ADMK	36,645	30.24	27,779
Chennai	18	Harbour	57.83	P. K. Sekar Babu	DMK	59,317	58.35	Vinoj P. Selvam	BJP	32,043	31.52	27,274
Chennai	19	Chepauk-Thiruvallikeni	58.70	Udhayanidhi Stalin	DMK	93,285	67.89	A. V. A. Kassali	PMK	23,930	17.42	69,355
Chennai	20	Thousand Lights	56.62	Ezhilan Naganathan	DMK	49,080	53.88	Khushbu	BJP	25,079	27.53	24,001
Chennai	21	Anna Nagar	57.71	M. K. Mohan	DMK	80,054	48.49	S. Gokula Indira	ADMK	52,609	31.87	27,445
Chennai	22	Virugampakkam	57.97	A. M. V. Prabhakara Raja	DMK	74,351	43.97	Virugai V. N. Ravi	ADMK	55,984	33.11	18,367
Chennai	23	Saidapet	57.46	Ma.Subramanian	DMK	80,194	50.02	S. Duraisamy	ADMK	50,786	31.68	29,408
Chennai	24	Thiyagaraya Nagar	56.36	J. Karunanithi	DMK	56,035	40.57	B. Sathyanarayanan	ADMK	55,898	40.47	137
Chennai	25	Mylapore	56.71	Dha. Velu	DMK	68,392	44.58	R. Nataraj	ADMK	55,759	36.34	12,633
Chennai	26	Velachery	56.17	Aassan Maulaana	INC	68,493	38.76	M. K. Ashok	ADMK	64,141	36.30	4,352
Chennai	27	Shozhinganallur	55.57	S. Aravind Ramesh	DMK	171,558	44.18	K. P. Kandan	ADMK	136,153	35.06	35,405
Chennai	28	Alandur	61.10	T. M. Anbarasan	DMK	116,785	49.12	B. Valarmathi	ADMK	76,214	32.06	40,571
Kancheepuram	29	Sriperumbudur (SC)	74.68	K. Selvaperunthagai	INC	115,353	43.65	K. Palani	ADMK	104,474	39.53	10,879
Chengalpattu	30	Pallavaram	61.02	I. Karunanithi	DMK	126,427	47.49	S. Rajendran	ADMK	88,646	33.30	37,781
Chengalpattu	31	Tambaram	59.90	S. R. Raja	DMK	116,840	46.93	T. K. M. Chinnayya	ADMK	80,016	32.14	36,824
Chengalpattu	32	Chengalpattu	63.97	M. Varalakshmi	DMK	130,573	47.64	M. Gajendran	ADMK	103,908	37.91	26,665
Chengalpattu	33	Thiruporur	76.96	S. S. Balaji	VCK	93,954	41.44	Thirukachur Arumugam	PMK	92,007	40.58	1,947
Chengalpattu	34	Cheyyur (SC)	78.75	M. Babu	VCK	82,750	46.20	S. Kanitha Sampath	ADMK	78,708	43.94	4,042
Chengalpattu	35	Maduranthakam (SC)	81.97	Maragatham Kumaravel	ADMK	86,646	46.62	Mallai C. E. Sathya	DMK	83,076	44.70	3,570
Kancheepuram	36	Uthiramerur	80.83	K. Sundar	DMK	93,427	44.38	V.Somasundaram	ADMK	91,805	43.61	1,622
Kancheepuram	37	Kancheepuram	74.20	C. V. M. P. Ezhilarasan	DMK	103,235	44.77	P. Mageshkumar	PMK	91,236	39.71	11,999
Ranipet	38	Arakkonam (SC)	75.41	S. Ravi	ADMK	85,399	49.82	J. Gowthama Sannah	VCK	58,230	33.97	27,169
Ranipet	39	Sholingur	80.60	A. N. Munirathinam	INC	110,228	49.18	A. M. Krishnan	PMK	83,530	37.27	24,878
Ranipet	41	Ranipet	77.63	R. Gandhi	DMK	103,291	49.79	S. M. Sukumar	ADMK	86,793	41.84	16,498
Ranipet	42	Arcot	79.93	J. L. Eswarappan	DMK	103,885	49.52	K. L. Elavazhagan	PMK	83,927	40.01	19,958
Vellore	40	Katpadi	74.43	Durai Murugan	DMK	85,140	45.71	V. Ramu	ADMK	84,394	45.31	746
Vellore	43	Vellore	70.96	P. Karthikeyan	DMK	84,299	46.86	S. R. K. Appu	ADMK	75,118	41.76	9,181
Vellore	44	Anaikattu	77.05	A. P. Nandakumar	DMK	95,159	48.11	D. Velazhagan	ADMK	88,799	44.89	6,360
Vellore	45	Kilvaithinankuppam (SC)	76.63	M. Jaganmoorthy	ADMK	84,579	48.57	K. Seetharaman	DMK	73,997	42.50	10,582
Vellore	46	Gudiyattam (SC)	72.94	V. Amulu	DMK	100,412	47.45	G. Paridha	ADMK	93,511	44.19	6,901
Tirupathur	47	Vaniyambadi	75.93	G Sendhil Kumar	ADMK	88,018	46.33	N. Mohammad Nayeem	IUML	83,114	43.74	4,904
Tirupathur	48	Ambur	74.59	A. C. Vilwanathan	DMK	90,476	50.86	K. Nazar Mohammed	ADMK	70,244	39.49	20,232
Tirupathur	49	Jolarpet	81.52	K. Devaraji	DMK	89,490	45.57	K. C. Veeramani	ADMK	88,399	45.02	1,091
Tirupathur	50	Tirupattur	77.72	A. Nallathambi	DMK	96,522	51.91	T. K. Raja	PMK	68,282	36.72	28,240
Krishnagiri	51	Uthangarai (SC)	78.99	T. M. Tamilselvam	ADMK	99,675	52.96	J. S. Arumugam	INC	71,288	37.87	28,387
Krishnagiri	52	Bargur	79.64	D. Mathiazhagan	DMK	97,256	49.17	A. Krishnan	ADMK	84,642	42.80	12,614
Krishnagiri	53	Krishnagiri	78.92	K. Ashok Kumar	ADMK	96,050	45.38	T. Senguttuvan	DMK	95,256	45.01	794
Krishnagiri	54	Veppanahalli	81.38	K. P. Munusamy	ADMK	94,104	45.87	P. Murugan	DMK	91,050	44.38	3,054
Krishnagiri	55	Hosur	70.53	Y. Prakaash	DMK	118,231	47.65	S. Jyothi Balakrishna Reddy	ADMK	105,864	42.67	12,367
Krishnagiri	56	Thalli	77.23	T. Ramachandran	CPI	120,641	62.18	Dr. C. Nagesh Kumar	BJP	64,415	33.20	56,226
Dharmapuri	57	Palacode	87.03	K. P. Anbalagan	ADMK	110,070	53.28	P. K. Murugan	DMK	81,970	39.68	28,100
Dharmapuri	58	Pennagaram	85.22	G. K. Mani	PMK	106,123	50.46	P. N. P. Inbasekaran	DMK	84,937	40.39	21,186
Dharmapuri	59	Dharmapuri	80.56	S. P. Venkateshwaran	PMK	105,630	48.60	Thadangam P. Subramani	DMK	78,770	36.24	26,860
Dharmapuri	60	Pappireddippatti	83.24	A. Govindasamy	ADMK	114,507	51.81	M. Prabhu Rajasekar	DMK	77,564	35.10	36,943
Dharmapuri	61	Harur (SC)	79.39	V. Sampathkumar	ADMK	99,061	49.89	A. Kumar	CPI(M)	68,699	34.60	30,362
Tiruvannamalai	62	Chengam (SC)	81.31	M. P. Giri	DMK	108,081	48.26	M. S. Nainakannu	ADMK	96,511	43.09	11,570
Tiruvannamalai	63	Tiruvannamalai	72.87	E. V. Velu	DMK	137,876	66.02	S. Thanigaivel	BJP	43,203	20.69	94,673
Tiruvannamalai	64	Kilpennathur	80.41	K. Pitchandi	DMK	104,675	51.34	K. Selvakumar	PMK	77,888	38.20	26,787
Tiruvannamalai	65	Kalasapakkam	80.62	P. S. T. Saravanan	DMK	94,134	47.92	V. Panneerselvam	ADMK	84,912	43.23	9,222
Tiruvannamalai	66	Polur	82.39	S. S. Krishnamoorthy	ADMK	97,732	48.38	K. V. Sekaran	DMK	88,007	43.57	9,725
Tiruvannamalai	67	Arani	79.73	Sevvoor S. Ramachandran	ADMK	102,961	46.50	S. S. Anbazhagan	DMK	99,833	45.09	3,128
Tiruvannamalai	68	Cheyyar	82.52	O. Jothi	DMK	102,460	47.78	K. Mohan	ADMK	90,189	42.05	12,771
Tiruvannamalai	69	Vandavasi (SC)	77.28	S. Ambethkumar	DMK	102,064	54.88	S. Murali Shankar	PMK	66,111	35.55	35,953
Villupuram	70	Gingee	79.30	K. S. Masthan	DMK	109,625	52.99	M. P. S. Rajendran	PMK	73,822	35.68	35,803
Villupuram	71	Mailam	78.33	C. Sivakumar	PMK	81,044	45.79	Dr. R. Masilamani	DMK	78,814	44.53	2,230
Villupuram	72	Tindivanam	79.17	P. Arjunan	ADMK	87,152	47.74	P. Seethapathy	DMK	77,399	42.40	9,753
Villupuram	73	Vanur (SC)	80.41	M. Chakrapani	ADMK	92,219	50.61	Vanni Arasu	VCK	70,492	38.69	21,727
Villupuram	74	Villupuram	78.14	R. Lakshmanan	DMK	102,271	49.92	C. V. Shanmugam	ADMK	87,403	42.66	14,868
Villupuram	75	Vikravandi	82.45	N. Pugazhenthi	DMK	93,730	48.81	R. Muthamilselvan	ADMK	84,157	43.47	9,573
Villupuram	76	Tirukkoyilur	77.03	K. Ponmudy	DMK	110,980	56.56	V. A. T. Kalivaradhan	BJP	51,300	26.14	59,680
Kallakurichi	77	Ulundurpettai	83.44	A. J. Manikannan	DMK	115,451	47.15	R. Kumaraguru	ADMK	110,195	45.00	5,256
Kallakurichi	78	Rishivandiyam	80.17	K. Karthikeyan	DMK	113,912	52.96	A. Santhosh	ADMK	72,184	33.56	41,728
Kallakurichi	79	Sankarapuram	80.35	T. Udhayasuriyan	DMK	121,186	56.16	Dr. G. Raja	PMK	75,223	34.86	45,963
Kallakurichi	80	Kallakurichi (SC)	78.80	M. Senthilkumar	ADMK	110,643	48.99	K. I. Manirathinam	INC	84,752	37.52	25,891
Salem	81	Gangavalli (SC)	78.03	A. Nallathambi	ADMK	89,568	48.02	J. Rekha Priyadarshini	DMK	82,207	44.08	7,361
Salem	82	Attur (SC)	78.42	A. P. Jayasankaran	ADMK	95,308	47.72	K. Chinnadurai	DMK	87,051	43.58	8,257
Salem	83	Yercaud (ST)	84.12	G. Chitra	ADMK	121,561	50.88	C. Tamilselvan	DMK	95,606	40.02	25,955
Salem	84	Omalur	84.08	R. Mani	ADMK	142,488	57.22	Rangarajan Kumaramangalam	INC	87,194	35.01	55,294
Salem	85	Mettur	76.15	S. Sadhasivam	PMK	97,055	44.43	S. Srinivasa Perumal	DMK	96,399	44.13	656
Salem	86	Edappadi	86.68	Edappadi K. Palaniswami	ADMK	163,154	65.97	Sampath Kumar	DMK	69,352	28.04	93,802
Salem	87	Sankari	84.67	S. Sundararajan	ADMK	115,472	49.72	K. M. Rajesh	DMK	95,427	41.09	20,045
Salem	88	Salem (West)	72.28	Arul Ramadas	PMK	105,483	48.69	A. Rajendran	DMK	83,984	38.77	21,499
Salem	89	Salem (North)	73.32	R. Rajendran	DMK	93,432	46.17	G. Venkatachalam	ADMK	85,844	42.42	7,588
Salem	90	Salem (South)	76.08	E. Balasubramanian	ADMK	97,506	48.76	A. S. Saravanan	DMK	74,897	37.45	22,609
Salem	91	Veerapandi	86.02	M. Rajamuthu	ADMK	111,682	49.92	Dr. A. K. Tharun	DMK	91,787	41.03	19,895
Namakkal	92	Rasipuram (SC)	83.23	M. Mathiventhan	DMK	90,727	46.08	V. Saroja	ADMK	88,775	45.09	1,952
Namakkal	93	Senthamangalam (ST)	81.80	K. Ponnusamy	DMK	90,681	45.51	S. Chandran	ADMK	80,188	40.25	10,493
Namakkal	94	Namakkal	80.18	P. Ramalingam	DMK	106,494	51.51	K. P. P. Baskar	ADMK	78,633	38.03	27,861
Namakkal	95	Paramathi-Velur	82.87	S. Sekar	ADMK	86,034	46.83	K. S. Moorthy	DMK	78,372	42.66	7,662
Namakkal	96	Tiruchengode	79.90	E. R. Eswaran	KMDK	81,688	44.23	Pon. Saraswathi	ADMK	78,826	42.69	2,862
Namakkal	97	Kumarapalayam	79.35	P. Thangamani	ADMK	100,800	49.92	M. Venkatachalam	DMK	69,154	34.25	31,646
Erode	98	Erode (East)	66.56	Thirumagan Evera	INC	67,300	44.27	M. Yuvaraja	ADMK	58,396	38.41	8,904
Erode	99	Erode (West)	70.14	S. Muthusamy	DMK	100,757	49.01	K. V. Ramalingam	ADMK	78,668	38.27	22,089
Erode	100	Modakkurichi	76.11	Dr. C.K. Saraswathi	BJP	78,125	42.96	Subbulakshmi Jagadeesan	DMK	77,844	42.81	281
Tiruppur	101	Dharapuram (SC)	75.02	N. Kayalvizhi	DMK	89,986	46.39	L. Murugan	BJP	88,593	45.67	1,393
Tiruppur	102	Kangayam	77.69	M. P. Saminathan	DMK	94,197	47.14	A. S. Ramalingam	ADMK	86,866	43.47	7,331
Erode	103	Perundurai	83.31	S. Jayakumar	ADMK	85,125	44.84	K. K. C. Balu	DMK	70,618	37.20	14,507
Erode	104	Bhavani	84.36	K. C. Karuppannan	ADMK	100,915	50.11	K. P. Durairaj	DMK	78,392	38.93	22,523
Erode	105	Anthiyur	80.32	A. G. Venkatachalam	DMK	79,096	44.84	K. S. Shanmugavel	ADMK	77,821	44.12	1,275
Erode	106	Gobichettipalayam	83.58	K. A. Sengottaiyan	ADMK	108,608	50.68	G. V. Manimaaran	DMK	80,045	37.36	28,563
Erode	107	Bhavanisagar (SC)	77.08	A. Bannari	ADMK	99,181	49.45	P. L. Sundaram	CPI	83,173	41.47	16,008
Nilgiris	108	Udhagamandalam	68.48	R. Ganesh	INC	65,530	46.44	M. Bhojarajan	BJP	60,182	42.65	5,348
Nilgiris	109	Gudalur (SC)	73.08	Pon. Jayaseelan	ADMK	64,496	46.65	S. Kasilingam	DMK	62,551	45.24	1,945
Nilgiris	110	Coonoor	70.74	K. Ramachandran	DMK	61,820	45.49	Kappachi D. Vinoth	ADMK	57,715	42.47	4,105
Coimbatore	111	Mettupalayam	75.80	A. K. Selvaraj	ADMK	105231	46.75	T. R. Shanmuga Sundaram	DMK	102775	45.66	2,456
Tiruppur	112	Avanashi (SC)	75.79	P. Dhanapal	ADMK	117,284	55.16	R. Athiyamaan	DMK	66,382	31.22	50,982
Tiruppur	113	Tiruppur (North)	62.80	K. N. Vijayakumar	ADMK	113,384	47.62	Subramanian M.	CPI	73,282	30.78	40,102
Tiruppur	114	Tiruppur (South)	62.79	K. Selvaraj	DMK	75,535	43.31	Gunasekaran S	ADMK	70,826	40.61	4,709
Tiruppur	115	Palladam	67.09	M. S. M. Anandan	ADMK	126,903	48.53	K. Muthurathinam	DMK	94,212	36.03	32,691
Coimbatore	116	Sulur	76.18	V. P. Kandasamy	ADMK	118,968	49.23	M. Kalichamy	DMK	87,036	36.02	32,302
Coimbatore	117	Kavundampalayam	66.60	G. Arunkumar	ADMK	135,669	43.78	R Krishnan	DMK	1,25,893	40.62	9,776
Coimbatore	118	Coimbatore (North)	59.87	Amman K. Arjunan	ADMK	81,454	40.16	V M Shamuga Sundaram	DMK	77,453	38.19	4,001
Coimbatore	119	Thondamuthur	70.54	S. P. Velumani	ADMK	124,225	53.89	Karthikeya Sivasenapathy	DMK	82,595	35.83	41,630
Coimbatore	120	Coimbatore (South)	61.22	Vanathi Srinivasan	BJP	53,209	34.38	Kamal Haasan	MNM	51,481	33.26	1,728
Coimbatore	121	Singanallur	62.11	K. R. Jayaram	ADMK	81,244	40.22	Karthik N	DMK	70,390	34.84	10,854
Coimbatore	122	Kinathukadavu	71.10	S. Damodaran	ADMK	101,537	43.68	Kuruchi Prabhakaran	DMK	100,442	43.21	1,095
Coimbatore	123	Pollachi	78.08	Pollachi V. Jayaraman	ADMK	80,567	45.44	K. Varadharajan	DMK	78,842	44.47	1,725
Coimbatore	124	Valparai (SC)	70.63	T. K. Amulkandasami	ADMK	71,672	49.37	Arumugam M.	CPI	59,449	40.95	12,223
Tiruppur	125	Udumalaipettai	72.05	Udumalai K. Radhakrishnan	ADMK	96,893	49.85	K. Thennarsu	INC	74,998	38.59	21,895
Tiruppur	126	Madathukulam	73.20	C. Mahendran	ADMK	84,313	46.35	Jayaramakrishnan	DMK	77,875	42.81	6,438
Dindigul	127	Palani	74.07	I. P. Senthil Kumar	DMK	108,566	52.86	K. Ravi Manoharan	ADMK	78,510	38.23	30,056
Dindigul	128	Oddanchatram	83.63	R. Sakkarapani	DMK	109,970	54.51	N. P. Nataraj	ADMK	81,228	40.26	28,742
Dindigul	129	Athoor	78.76	I. Periyasamy	DMK	165,809	72.11	M Thilagabama	PMK	30,238	13.15	135,571
Dindigul	130	Nilakottai (SC)	75.57	S. Thenmozhi	ADMK	91,461	49.49	S. K. Murugavel Rajan	DMK	63,843	34.55	27,618
Dindigul	131	Natham	79.44	Natham R. Viswanathan	ADMK	107,762	47.84	M. A. Andi Ambalam	DMK	95,830	42.54	11,932
Dindigul	132	Dindigul	70.49	Dindigul C. Sreenivaasan	ADMK	90,545	46.83	N. Pandi	CPI(M)	72,848	34.34	17,697
Dindigul	133	Vedasandur	80.85	S. Gandhirajan	DMK	106,481	49.97	V. P. B. Paramasivam	ADMK	88,928	41.73	17,553
Karur	134	Aravakurichi	82.78	R. Elango	DMK	93,369	52.72	K. Annamalai	BJP	68,553	38.71	24,816
Karur	135	Karur	84.49	V. Senthilbalaji	DMK	101,757	49.08	M. R. Vijayabhaskar	ADMK	89,309	43.08	12,448
Karur	136	Krishnarayapuram (SC)	84.91	K. Sivagama Sundari	DMK	96,540	53.37	N. Muthukumar (A) Thanesh	ADMK	64,915	35.88	29,625
Karur	137	Kulithalai	86.88	R. Manickam	DMK	100,829	51.06	N. R. Chandrasekar	ADMK	77,289	39.14	23,540
Tiruchirappalli	138	Manapaarai	76.54	P. Abdul Samad	DMK	98,077	44.23	Chandraseker. R	ADMK	85,834	38.71	12,243
Tiruchirappalli	139	Srirangam	77.07	M. Palaniyandi	DMK	113,904	47.41	K. P. Krishnan	ADMK	93,989	39.12	19,915
Tiruchirappalli	140	Tiruchirappalli (West)	68.02	K. N. Nehru	DMK	118,133	64.52	V. Padmanathan	ADMK	33,024	18.04	85,109
Tiruchirappalli	141	Tiruchirappalli (East)	67.77	Inigo S. Irudayaraj	DMK	94,302	54.56	Vellamandi N. Natarajan	ADMK	40,505	23.43	53,797
Tiruchirappalli	142	Thiruverumbur	67.19	Anbil Mahesh	DMK	105,424	53.51	P. Kumar	ADMK	55,727	28.29	49,697
Tiruchirappalli	143	Lalgudi	80.11	A. Soundara Pandian	DMK	84,914	48.59	D. R. Dharmarajè	ADMK	67,965	38.89	16,949
Tiruchirappalli	144	Manachanallur	80.56	S. Kathiravan	DMK	116,334	59.14	M. Paranjothi	ADMK	56,716	28.83	59,618
Tiruchirappalli	145	Musiri	77.24	N. Thiyagarajan	DMK	90,624	50.43	M. Selvarasu	ADMK	63,788	35.50	26,836
Tiruchirappalli	146	Thuraiyur (SC)	77.77	S. Stalinkumar	DMK	87,786	49.91	T. Indira Gandhi	ADMK	65,715	37.36	22,071
Perambalur	147	Perambalur (SC)	79.28	M. Prabhakaran	DMK	122,090	50.87	R. Thamizhselvan	ADMK	90,325	37.94	31,765
Perambalur	148	Kunnam	80.39	S. S. Sivasankar	DMK	1,03,922	47.26	R. T. Ramachandran	ADMK	97,593	44.38	6,329
Ariyalur	149	Ariyalur	85.00	K. Chinnappa	DMK	103,975	46.16	Thamarai S. Rajendran	ADMK	100,741	44.73	3,234
Ariyalur	150	Jayankondam	81.12	Ka. So. Ka. Kannan	DMK	99,529	46.00	K. Balu	PMK	94,077	43.48	5,452
Cuddalore	151	Tittakudi (SC)	76.65	C. V. Ganesan	DMK	83,726	49.78	D. Periyasamy	BJP	62,163	36.96	21,563
Cuddalore	152	Vriddhachalam	77.79	R. Radhakrishnan	INC	77,064	39.17	J. Karthikeyan	PMK	76,202	38.73	862
Cuddalore	153	Neyveli	75.06	Saba Rajendran	DMK	75,177	45.80	K. Jagan	PMK	74,200	45.21	977
Cuddalore	154	Panruti	80.26	T. Velmurugan	DMK	93,801	47.60	R. Rajendran	ADMK	89,104	45.22	4,697
Cuddalore	155	Cuddalore	76.00	G. Iyappan	DMK	84,563	46.46	M. C. Sampath	ADMK	79,412	43.63	5,151
Cuddalore	156	Kurinjipadi	81.71	M. R. K. Panneerselvam	DMK	1,01,456	51.04	Selvi Ramajayam	ADMK	83,929	42.22	17,527
Cuddalore	157	Bhuvanagiri	79.30	A. Arunmozhithevan	ADMK	96,453	48.92	Durai K. Saravanan	DMK	88,194	44.73	8,259
Cuddalore	158	Chidambaram	73.02	K. A. Pandian	ADMK	91,961	50.16	A. S. Abdul Rahman Rabbani	IUML	75,024	40.92	16,937
Cuddalore	159	Kattumannarkoil (SC)	76.61	Sinthanai Selvan	VCK	86,056	49.02	N. Murugumaran	ADMK	74,608	43.00	11,448
Mayiladuthurai	160	Sirkazhi (SC)	75.74	M. Panneerselvam	DMK	94,057	49.16	P. V. Bharathi	ADMK	81,909	42.81	12,148
Mayiladuthurai	161	Mayiladuthurai	70.97	S. Rajakumar	INC	73,642	42.17	Sithamalli A. Palanisami	PMK	70,900	40.60	2,742
Mayiladuthurai	162	Poompuhar	75.33	Nivedha M. Murugan	DMK	96,102	46.24	S. Pavunraj	ADMK	92,803	44.65	3,299
Nagapattinam	163	Nagapattinam	72.52	Aloor Shanavas	VCK	66,281	46.17	Thanga Kathiravan	ADMK	59,043	41.13	7,238
Nagapattinam	164	Kilvelur (SC)	79.99	P. Mahalingam	CPI(M)	67,988	47.55	Vadivel Ravanan	PMK	51,003	35.67	16,985
Nagapattinam	165	Vedaranyam	81.99	O. S. Manian	ADMK	78,719	49.80	S. K. Vetharathinam	DMK	66,390	42.00	12,329
Tiruvarur	166	Thiruthuraipoondi (SC)	77.43	K. Marimuthu	CPI	97,092	52.23	C. Suresh Kumar	ADMK	67,024	36.06	30,068
Tiruvarur	167	Mannargudi	74.31	Dr. T. R. B. Rajaa	DMK	87,172	45.11	Siva. Rajamanickam	ADMK	49,779	25.76	37,393
Tiruvarur	168	Thiruvarur	73.68	K. Poondi Kalaivanan	DMK	108,906	52.29	A. N. R. Panneerselvam	ADMK	57,732	27.72	51,174
Tiruvarur	169	Nannilam	81.51	R. Kamaraj	ADMK	103,637	46.70	S. Jothiraman	DMK	99,213	44.70	4,424
Thanjavur	170	Thiruvidaimarudur (SC)	76.47	Govi. Chezhiyan	DMK	95,763	48.26	Union S. Veeramani	ADMK	85,083	42.87	10,680
Thanjavur	171	Kumbakonam	72.34	G. Anbalagan	DMK	96,057	48.62	M. Srithar Vandayar	ADMK	74,674	37.80	21,383
Thanjavur	172	Papanasam	75.49	Dr. M. H. Jawahirullah	DMK	86,567	43.95	K. Gopinathan	ADMK	70,294	35.69	16,273
Thanjavur	173	Thiruvaiyaru	78.72	Durai Chandrasekaran	DMK	103,210	48.82	Poondi S. Venkatesan	BJP	49,560	23.44	53,650
Thanjavur	174	Thanjavur	66.98	T. K. G. Neelamegam	DMK	103,772	53.25	V. Arivudainambi	ADMK	56,623	29.06	47,149
Thanjavur	175	Orathanadu	78.70	R. Vaithilingam	ADMK	90,063	46.95	M. Ramachandran	DMK	61,228	31.92	28,835
Thanjavur	176	Pattukkottai	72.07	K. Annadurai	DMK	79,065	44.62	N. R. Rengarajan	ADMK	53,796	30.36	25,269
Thanjavur	177	Peravurani	77.6	Peravurani N. Ashokkumar	DMK	89,130	52.17	S. V. Thirugnana Sambandam	ADMK	65,627	38.41	23,503
Pudukottai	178	Gandharvakottai (SC)	78.18	M. Chinnadurai	CPI(M)	69,710	44.23	S. Jayabharati	ADMK	56,989	36.16	12,721
Pudukottai	179	Viralimalai	85.89	C. Vijayabaskar	ADMK	102,179	52.83	M. Palaniappan	DMK	78,581	40.63	23,598
Pudukottai	180	Pudukkottai	73.72	Dr. V. Muthuraja	DMK	85,802	47.70	V. R. Karthik Thondaiman	ADMK	72,801	40.47	13,001
Pudukottai	181	Thirumayam	76.37	S. Regupathy	DMK	71,349	41.00	P. K. Vairamuthu	ADMK	69,967	40.20	1,382
Pudukottai	182	Alangudi	79.06	Meyyanathan Siva V	DMK	87,935	51.17	Dharma. Thangavel	ADMK	62,088	36.13	25,847
Pudukottai	183	Aranthangi	70.90	T. Ramachandran	INC	81,835	48.70	M. Rajanayagam	ADMK	50,942	30.31	30,893
Sivaganga	184	Karaikudi	66.96	S. Mangudi	INC	75,954	35.75	H. Raja	BJP	54,365	25.59	21,589
Sivaganga	185	Tiruppattur	72.24	K. R. Periyakaruppan	DMK	103,682	49.19	Marudhu Alaguraj	ADMK	66,308	31.46	37,374
Sivaganga	186	Sivaganga	67.09	P. R. Senthilnathan	ADMK	82,153	40.66	S. Gunasekaran	CPI(M)	70,900	35.09	11,253
Sivaganga	187	Manamadurai (SC)	72.88	A. Tamilarasi	DMK	89,364	44.01	S. Nagarajan	ADMK	75,273	37.07	14,091
Madurai	188	Melur	74.61	P. Selvam	ADMK	83,344	45.60	T. Ravichandran	INC	48,182	26.36	35,162
Madurai	189	Madurai East	72.26	P. Moorthy	DMK	122,729	51.59	Gopalakrishnan	ADMK	73,125	30.74	49,604
Madurai	190	Sholavandan (SC)	80.17	A. Venkatesan	DMK	84,240	48.04	Manickam	ADMK	67,195	38.32	17,045
Madurai	191	Madurai North	64.27	G. Thalapathi	DMK	73,010	46.64	P. Saravanan	BJP	50,094	32.00	22,916
Madurai	192	Madurai South	62.24	M. Boominathan	DMK	62,812	42.49	S.S.Saravanan	ADMK	56,297	38.08	6,515
Madurai	193	Madurai Central	61.77	Palanivel Thiagarajan	DMK	73,205	48.99	Jothi Muthuramalingam	ADMK	39,029	26.12	34,176
Madurai	194	Madurai West	65.67	Sellur K. Raju	ADMK	83,883	41.59	C. Chinnammal	DMK	74,762	37.07	9,121
Madurai	195	Thiruparankundram	73.36	V. V. Rajan Chellappa	ADMK	103,683	43.96	S. K. Ponnuthai	CPI(M)	74,194	31.46	29,489
Madurai	196	Tirumangalam	78.86	R. B. Udhaya Kumar	ADMK	100,338	45.51	M. Maniraman	DMK	86,251	39.12	14,087
Madurai	197	Usilampatti	74.19	P. Ayyappan	ADMK	71,255	33.53	P. V. Kathiravan	DMK	63,778	30.01	7,477
Theni	198	Andipatti	75.28	A. Maharajan	DMK	93,541	44.64	A. Logirajan	ADMK	85,003	40.57	8,538
Theni	199	Periyakulam (SC)	70.69	K. S. Saravana Kumar	DMK	92,251	45.71	M. Murugan	ADMK	70,930	35.15	21,321
Theni	200	Bodinayakanur	77.04	O. Panneerselvam	ADMK	100,050	46.58	Thanga Tamil Selvan	DMK	89,029	41.45	11,021
Theni	201	Cumbum	70.17	N. Eramakrishnan	DMK	104,800	51.81	S. P. M. Syed Khan	ADMK	62,387	30.84	42,413
Virudhunagar	202	Rajapalayam	74.63	S. Thangappandian	DMK	74,158	41.50	K. T. Rajenthra Bhalaji	ADMK	70,260	39.32	3,898
Virudhunagar	203	Srivilliputhur (SC)	73.83	E. M. Manraj	ADMK	70,475	38.09	P. S. W. Madhava Rao ^{†}	INC	57,737	31.20	12,738
Virudhunagar	204	Sattur	75.69	A. R. R. Raghuraman	DMK	74,174	38.68	R. K. Ravichandran	ADMK	62,995	32.85	11,179
Virudhunagar	205	Sivakasi	70.88	A. M. S. G. Ashokan	INC	78,947	42.66	Lakshmi Ganesan	ADMK	61,628	33.30	17,319
Virudhunagar	206	Virudhunagar	72.16	A. R. R. Seenivasan	DMK	73,297	45.32	G. Pandurangan	BJP	51,598	32.13	21,699
Virudhunagar	207	Aruppukkottai	76.49	Sattur Ramachandran	DMK	91,040	53.18	Vaigaichelvan	ADMK	52,006	30.38	39,034
Virudhunagar	208	Tiruchuli	78.65	Thangam Thennarasu	DMK	102,225	59.15	S. Rajasekar	ADMK	41,233	23.86	60,992
Ramanathapuram	209	Paramakudi (SC)	71.11	S. Murugesan	DMK	84,864	46.59	N. Sadhan Prabhakar	ADMK	71,579	39.30	13,285
Ramanathapuram	210	Tiruvadanai	69.30	R. M. Karumanikam	INC	79,364	39.33	K. C. Animuthu	ADMK	65,512	32.46	13,852
Ramanathapuram	211	Ramanathapuram	69.41	K. Muthuramalingam	DMK	111,082	51.88	D. Kuppuram	BJP	60,603	28.31	50,479
Ramanathapuram	212	Mudhukulathur	71.13	R. S. Raja Kannappan	DMK	101,901	46.06	Keerthika Muniyasamy	ADMK	81,180	36.70	20,721
Thoothukudi	213	Vilathikulam	77.06	G. V. Markandayan	DMK	90,348	54.05	P. Chinnappan	ADMK	51,799	30.99	38,549
Thoothukudi	214	Thoothukkudi	65.99	P. Geetha Jeevan	DMK	92,314	49.00	S. D. R. Vijayaseelan	ADMK	42,004	22.29	50,310
Thoothukudi	215	Tiruchendur	71.20	Anitha R. Radhakrishnan	DMK	88,274	50.58	M. Radhakrishnan	ADMK	63,011	36.10	25,263
Thoothukudi	216	Srivaikuntam	73.16	Oorvasi S. Amirtharaj	INC	76,843	46.75	S. P. Shanmuganathan	ADMK	59,471	36.18	17,372
Thoothukudi	217	Ottapidaram (SC)	70.68	M. C. Shunmugaiah	DMK	73,110	41.11	P. Mohan	ADMK	64,600	36.32	8,510
Thoothukudi	218	Kovilpatti	67.86	Kadambur C. Raju	ADMK	68,556	37.89	T. T. V. Dhinakaran	AMMK	56,153	31.04	12,403
Tenkasi	219	Sankarankovil (SC)	72.11	E. Raja	DMK	71,347	38.92	V. M. Rajalakshmi	ADMK	66,050	36.03	5,297
Tenkasi	220	Vasudevanallur (SC)	72.75	Dr. T. Sadhan Tirumalaikumar	DMK	68,730	39.08	A. Manoharan	ADMK	66,363	37.70	2,367
Tenkasi	221	Kadayanallur	70.71	C. Krishnamurali	ADMK	88,474	43.08	K. A. M. Muhammed Abubacker	IUML	64,125	31.22	24,349
Tenkasi	222	Tenkasi	73.19	S. Palani Nadar	INC	89,315	41.71	S. Selvamohandas Pandian	ADMK	88,945	41.54	370
Tenkasi	223	Alangulam	78.05	P. H. Manoj Pandian	ADMK	74,153	36.44	Dr. Poongothai Aladi Aruna	DMK	70,614	34.70	3,539
Tirunelveli	224	Tirunelveli	67.57	Nainar Nagendran	BJP	92,282	46.70	A. L. S. Lakshmanan	DMK	69,175	35.01	23,107
Tirunelveli	225	Ambasamudram	72.52	E. Subaya	ADMK	85,211	47.96	R. Avudaiappan	DMK	68,296	38.44	16,915
Tirunelveli	226	Palayamkottai	58.89	M. Abdul Wahab	DMK	89,117	55.32	G. Gerald	ADMK	36,976	22.95	52,141
Tirunelveli	227	Nanguneri	69.29	Ruby R. Manoharan	INC	75,902	39.43	Ganesa Raja	ADMK	59,416	30.86	16,486
Tirunelveli	228	Radhapuram	69.18	M. Appavu	DMK	82,331	43.95	I.S. Inbudurai	ADMK	76,406	40.79	5,925
Kanniyakumari	229	Kanniyakumari	76.66	N. Thalavai Sundaram	ADMK	109,745	48.80	S. Austin	DMK	93,532	41.59	16,213
Kanniyakumari	230	Nagercoil	68.00	M. R. Gandhi	BJP	88,804	48.21	N. Suresh Rajan	DMK	77,135	41.88	11,669
Kanniyakumari	231	Colachel	67.95	J. G. Prince	INC	90,681	49.56	P. Ramesh	BJP	65,849	35.99	24,832
Kanniyakumari	232	Padmanabhapuram	70.65	Mano Thangaraj	DMK	87,744	51.57	D. John Thangam	ADMK	60,859	35.77	26,885
Kanniyakumari	233	Vilavancode	67.12	S. Vijayadharani	INC	87,473	52.12	R. Jayaseelan	BJP	58,804	35.04	28,669
Kanniyakumari	234	Killiyoor	66.54	S. Rajeshkumar	INC	101,541	59.76	K. V. Jude Dev	ADMK	46,141	27.15	55,400

=== Analysis and trends ===
- In Northern Tamil Nadu, the Chennai Metropolitan Area and its surroundings proved to be a stronghold of the DMK. The DMK-led SPA completely swept all of the constituencies in Chennai, Thiruvallur, and Kanchipuram districts. While facing tough competition in other parts of the North, the DMK bagged 64 of the region's 78 seats, overcoming the polarization between the AIADMK and the DMK that existed in the region in the 2016 election. The region expressed a strong anti-NDA trend, with the results indicating that the AIADMK did not benefit much from its alliance with the PMK and the 10.5% internal reservation that was granted to the Vanniyar community within the Most Backward Community (MBC) quota.
- The politically sensitive Central Tamil Nadu and Kaveri delta region exhibited an overwhelming support for the SPA, with the AIADMK-led NDA winning only four out of the region's 41 seats. The DMK was met with victory in all the seats of Tiruchirappalli, Perambalur, Ariyalur and Mayiladuthurai districts, crucially. The resentment that prevailed amongst the region's farmers over the former AIADMK government's inability to resolve agricultural problems in the region has been cited as a reason.
- Except Madurai district, which was equally split between the AIADMK and DMK, much of Southern Tamil Nadu swinged towards the DMK alliance, an anti-incumbent trend compared to 2016, in which the Jayalalithaa-led AIADMK (without the BJP) had swept most of the region's seats, except Kanyakumari district, which remained as an SPA stronghold. The region also gave the DMK its highest victory margin ever, with over 130,000 votes in Athoor constituency where its senior leader I. Periasamy defeated the PMK candidate.
- The AIADMK maintained its traditional sway in Western Tamil Nadu, popularly known as Kongu Nadu, where the NDA won more than 70% of the constituencies. Most notably, the NDA won in all the constituencies of Coimbatore and Dharmapuri districts.
- The cities of Tamil Nadu fuelled the DMK's victory in the election. 2021 exposed "a clear rural-urban divide" in the voting patterns of the state. Trends showed that DMK performed very well in the urban centres than the AIADMK. There are 154 rural, 30 semi-urban and 50 urban constituencies in the state. The DMK alliance won 40 of those urban seats, 96 of the rural seats and 23 of the semi-urban seats. Of the 75 seats the AIADMK alliance won, 58 were in rural areas, with only seven in semi-urban and 10 in urban centres. The SPA's strike rate was 80% in urban seats, 76% in semi-urban seats and 62% in rural seats, whereas the NDA's strike rate was 37% in rural seats, 23% in semi-urban seats and 20% in urban seats.

== Strike Rate ==
Strike rate is determined by calculating the number of seats won by a party of the number of seats it contested.

Alliance/ Party		Seats contested	Seats Won	Strike Rate
DPA	DMK	188	133	70.74%
DPA	INC	25	18	72%
DPA	VCK	6	4	66.66%
DPA	CPI(M)	6	2	33.33%
DPA	CPI	6	2	33.33%
DPA	Total	234	159	67.94%
NDA	AIADMK	191	66	34.55%
NDA	PMK	23	5	21.73%
NDA	BJP	20	4	20%
NDA	Total	234	75	32.05%

== Bypolls 2021–2026 ==
Date	S.No	Constituency	MLA before election	Party before election	Reason for the election	Elected MLA	Party after election
27 February 2023	98	Erode East	Thirumagan Evera	Indian National Congress	Died on 4 January 2023	E. V. K. S. Elangovan	Indian National Congress
19 April 2024	233	Vilavancode	S. Vijayadharani	Indian National Congress	Resigned on 24 February 2024	Tharahai Cuthbert	Indian National Congress
10 July 2024	75	Vikravandi	N. Pugazhenthi	Dravida Munnetra Kazhagam	Died on 6 April 2024	Anniyur Siva	Dravida Munnetra Kazhagam
5 February 2025	98	Erode East	E. V. K. S. Elangovan	Indian National Congress	Died on 14 December 2024	V. C. Chandhirakumar	Dravida Munnetra Kazhagam

== Reactions and aftermath ==
Palaniswami and his ministers resigned on 3 May 2021, submitting their papers of resignation to Banwarilal Purohit, the Governor of Tamil Nadu. During the early hours of the same day, DMK president Stalin paid respects at the memorial of his father and five-time Chief Minister, M. Karunanidhi. Speaking to the journalists gathered there, Stalin stated that he will be sworn in as the Chief Minister in a simplistic ceremony that may be held at the Raj Bhavan, the Governor's residence. He underlined that the DMK will form the government for the sixth time in Tamil Nadu, and will follow the footsteps of Karunanidhi. Stalin added that the DMK's governance "will be such that those who had voted for the party will feel happy voting for it, and even those who did not vote would regret their decision to not have voted for the party".

After the resignation of Palanisami's administration, officials of the Public Works Department began resetting the Tamil Nadu Secretariat to prepare the campus for the new government under Stalin. The Chief Minister's Office returned all the files to the departments concerned, with the office quarters white-washed and name-boards of former ministers taken down.

Politicians, celebrities and government officials across India congratulated Stalin on his victory. The out-going Chief Minister Palanisami congratulated Stalin, tweeting: "My best wishes to M.K. Stalin who is going to take oath as Tamil Nadu Chief Minister". In another tweet, Stalin thanked Palanisami and sought his cooperation for "building the best Tamil Nadu". Narendra Modi, the Prime Minister of India, tweeted that he will work with Stalin to enhance the nation's progress, fulfill the regional interests of Tamil Nadu, and fight the COVID-19 pandemic.

On 10 May 2021, the newly elected AIADMK MLAs convened to choose the new Leader of the Opposition, an important post equivalent to a cabinet minister. The meeting was inconclusive, with both Panneerselvam and Palaniswami staking claims to the post, while their supporters hurled charges against each other. This included a prolonged quarrel between the two sections of the party outside the party's head office, causing unrest. Supporters of Palaniswami believed that he should be the Leader of the Opposition due to the party's good performance in the election in western Tamil Nadu, the region he hails from; whereas, Panneerselvam's supporters felt that the party fared poorly in other regions of the state due to Palaniswami's wrong policies during his Chief Ministerial tenure. Eventually, Palaniswami was elected as the Leader of the Opposition.

After MNM performed unfavorably in its first-ever election, many officials and candidates resigned from the party, such as its vice president Dr. Mahendran, Muruganandam, C K Kumaravel. Mahendran said that "the attitude of Kamal Haasan towards the growth of the party has not been changed even after facing huge loss in the Tamil Nadu assembly election". He cited the presence of "Sankhya solutions" in the party and added that Haasan is being misguided. Others cited "personal reasons".

On 4 May 2021, two days after the declaration of the election results, reports emerged two individuals allegedly associated with the DMK, vandalised an Amma Unavagam in Mogappair, located in the Ambattur Assembly constituency. The opposition AIADMK condemned the incident. Subsequently, DMK president Stalin expelled the individuals accused of involvement in the attack.

=== Formation of government ===
On 3 May 2021, Durai Murugan, the general secretary of the DMK, called for a meeting of all the party's newly elected MLAs on 4 May 2021, at 4 PM, in Anna Arivalayam (the DMK headquarters, Chennai). In the meeting, the 133 MLAs formally extended their support to Stalin's appointment as the DMK's head at the Tamil Nadu Legislative Assembly, making him the Chief-Minister-elect. Stalin's council of ministers and their allocated departments were revealed on 6 May 2021. The Stalin administration took charge on 7 May 2021, sworn in by Governor Purohit, in a ceremony at Raj Bhavan. Stalin became the eighth Chief Minister of Tamil Nadu, and the twelfth Chief Minister since the linguistic reformation of the state's boundaries in 1956.
