= G. Balamurugan =

Indian politician (born 1982)

Member of the Tamil Nadu Legislative Assembly
- Incumbent
- Assumed office 7 May 2026
- Chief Minister: C. Joseph Vijay
- Preceded by: Joseph Samuel
- Constituency: Ambattur

Personal details
- Party: Tamilaga Vettri Kazhagam
- Parent: Ganesan (father)
- Education: Velammal Matriculation Higher Secondary School, Mogappair

Ganesan Balamurugan (born 1982) is an Indian politician from Tamil Nadu. He is a member of the Tamil Nadu Legislative Assembly from Ambattur Assembly constituency in Chennai district, representing Tamilaga Vettri Kazhagam.

== Early life and education ==
Balamurugan is from Chennai, Tamil Nadu. He is the son of Ganesan. He studied at Velammal Matriculation Higher Secondary School, Mogappair, and passed Class 10 in 1998. Later, he did a course in computer education in 2001.

== Political career ==
Balamurugan became an MLA for the first time winning the 2026 Tamil Nadu Legislative Assembly election from Ambattur Assembly constituency representing Tamilaga Vettri Kazhagam. He polled 1,33,339 votes and defeated his nearest opponent, A. P. Poornima of the Dravida Munnetra Kazhagam, by a margin of 58,781 votes.

== Electoral performance ==
Election	Constituency	Political party	Result	Vote %	Opposition			Ref
Election	Constituency	Political party	Result	Vote %	Candidate	Political party	Vote %	Ref
2026	Ambattur	TVK	Won	51.29%	Dr. A. P. Poornima	DMK	28.68%	-
