= V. Alexander =

Indian politician

Member of the Tamil Nadu Legislative Assembly
- In office 2016–2021
- Preceded by: S. Vedachalam
- Succeeded by: Joseph Samuel
- Constituency: Ambattur

Personal details
- Party: All India Anna Dravida Munnetra Kazhagam

V. Alexander is a politician from Tamil Nadu, India. He was elected from the Ambattur constituency to the Fifteenth Tamil Nadu Legislative Assembly as a member of the All India Anna Dravida Munnetra Kazhagam political party in the 2016 Tamil Nadu legislative assembly elections.

== Electoral performance ==
Election	Constituency	Political party	Result	Vote %	Opposition			Ref
Election	Constituency	Political party	Result	Vote %	Candidate	Political party	Vote %	Ref
2016	Ambattur	AIADMK	Won	41.10%	J. M. H. Aassan Maulaana	INC	33.48%	
2021	Ambattur	AIADMK	Lost	30.43%	Joseph Samuel	DMK	48.14%	-
