= Aloor Shanavas =

Indian politician, activist, writer, and orator

MD Aloor Sha Navas

Member of the Tamil Nadu Legislative Assembly
- In office 2 May 2021 – 4 May 2026
- Preceded by: Thamimum Ansari
- Constituency: Nagapattinam

Deputy General Secretary of Viduthalai Chiruthaigal Katchi

Personal details
- Born: 22 April 1982 (age 44) Aloor, Kanyakumari District, Tamil Nadu, India
- Party: Viduthalai Chiruthaigal Katchi
- Spouse: Parveen
- Children: 1 son
- Occupation: • Politician • Social Worker

J. Mohamed Shanavas (born 22 April 1982), known as Aloor Sha Navas, is an Indian politician, writer, and from Tamil Nadu. He is currently the Deputy Secretary General of Viduthalai Chiruthaigal Katchi. Between May 2021 and April 2026, he was an elected member of the Tamil Nadu Legislative Assembly representing the Nagapattinam constituency.

== Early life and education ==
Shanavas was born into a middle-class family in Aloor near Nagercoil in Kanyakumari District. His parents are Jainul Abideen and Raabiyath Beevi. He is married to Parveen. They have a son together.

== Politics ==
In 2016, Shanavas stood for his first Tamil Nadu state legislative assembly elections from the Kunnam constituency. He was the joint candidate of the People's Welfare Front Alliance. He garnered just 19,853 votes and lost the elections to R. T. Ramachandran (politician) by a huge margin.

In 2021, he stood for elections from the Nagapattinam Assembly constituency as the candidate for Viduthalai Chiruthaigal Katchi (VCK). He defeated his nearest AIADMK rival with an individual 'pot' symbol as a part of the DMK-led alliance.

Shanavas did not contest the 2026 Tamil Nadu Legislative Assembly elections.

Currently, he serves as the Deputy General Secretary of VCK party, a Dravidian political party for all caste equality. He is a strong follower of Thanthai Periyar, Muhammad Ismail and B.R.Ambedkar.

== Activism ==
Shanavas has written six books and directed three documentaries to highlight the issues in the country.

Shanavas received death threats from a BJP worker who said in social media that a news of Shanavas will come soon as a prize for victory of the BJP in 4 seats in the state. The BJP worker was later arrested by the police.

== Awards and honours ==
- Young Media Activist award from Kuwait Tamil Islamic Committee.
- Ilam Pirai Award from Kuwait.
- Young Writer Award-Athayi Arabic College, Chennai.
