= Ambattur Assembly constituency =

State Legislative Assembly Constituencies in Tamil Nadu

Coordinates: 13.101465°N 80.158997°E

Ambattur
- Constituency No. 8 for the Tamil Nadu Legislative Assembly
- Interactive map outlining Ambattur assembly constituency in Chennai district

Constituency details
- Country: India
- Region: South India
- State: Tamil Nadu
- District: Chennai
- Lok Sabha constituency: Sriperumbudur
- Established: 2008
- Total electors: 337,019

Member of Legislative Assembly
- 17th Tamil Nadu Legislative Assembly
- Incumbent G. Balamurugan
- Party: TVK
- Elected year: 2026

Ambattur is a state assembly constituency in Tamil Nadu, India that was newly formed after the 2008 constituency delimitation. Its State Assembly Constituency number is 8. Located in Chennai district, it consists of Ambattur taluk and part of Chennai corporation. It is included in Sriperumbudur Lok Sabha constituency. It is one of the 234 State Legislative Assembly Constituencies in Tamil Nadu.

== Members of the Legislative Assembly ==
Election	Member	Party
2011	S. Vedachalam	All India Anna Dravida Munnetra Kazhagam
2016	V. Alexander	All India Anna Dravida Munnetra Kazhagam
2021	Joseph Samuel	Dravida Munnetra Kazhagam
2026	G. Balamurugan	Tamilaga Vettri Kazhagam

== Election results ==
Vote share of winning candidates
2026	51.29%
2021	48.14%
2016	41.10%
2011	53.30%

=== Assembly election 2026 ===
2026 Tamil Nadu Legislative Assembly election : Ambattur
Party	Candidate	Votes	%	±%
TVK	G. Balamurugan	133,339	51.29%	New
DMK	Dr. A. P. Poornima	74,558	28.68%	▼19.46
PMK	K. N. Sekar	35,997	13.85%	New
NTK	Silambarasan	11,088	4.26%	▼5.28
NOTA	None of the above	1,490	0.57%	▼0.42
Margin of victory		58,781	22.61%	▲4.90
Turnout		260,675	77.33%	▲14.79
Total valid votes		259,986		
Registered electors		337,081		▼12.30
TVK gain from DMK		Swing	▲3.15	

=== Assembly election 2021 ===
2021 Tamil Nadu Legislative Assembly election : Ambattur
Party	Candidate	Votes	%	±%
DMK	Joseph Samuel	114,554	48.14%	New
AIADMK	V. Alexander	72,408	30.43%	▼10.67
NTK	R. Anbu Thenarasan	22,701	9.54%	▲7.34
MNM	S. Vaitheswaran	22,370	9.40%	New
AMMK	S. Vedachalam	2,631	1.11%	New
NOTA	None of the above	2,358	0.99%	▼1.45
Margin of victory		42,146	17.71%	▲10.09
Turnout		240,383	62.54%	▼1.39
Total valid votes		237,941		
Rejected ballots		84	0.03%	▼0.01
Registered electors		384,377		▲6.97
DMK gain from AIADMK		Swing	▲7.04	

=== Assembly election 2016 ===
2016 Tamil Nadu Legislative Assembly election : Ambattur
Party	Candidate	Votes	%	±%
AIADMK	V. Alexander	94,375	41.10%	▼12.20
INC	J. M. H. Aassan Maulaana	76,877	33.48%	New
PMK	K. N. Sekar	16,635	7.24%	New
DMDK	J. Constandine Ravindran	16,631	7.24%	New
BJP	C. Devarajan	9,563	4.16%	▲2.06
NOTA	None of the above	5,603	2.44%	New
NTK	R. Anbu Thenarasan	5,044	2.20%	New
Margin of victory		17,498	7.62%	▼4.57
Turnout		229,715	63.93%	▲63.93
Total valid votes		229,632		
Rejected ballots		83	0.04%	
Registered electors		359,345		▲35.61
AIADMK hold		Swing	▼12.20	

=== Assembly election 2011 ===
2011 Tamil Nadu Legislative Assembly election : Ambattur
Party	Candidate	Votes	%	±%
AIADMK	S. Vedachalam	99,330	53.30%	New
DMK	B. Ranaganathan	76,613	41.11%	New
BJP	T. Jeyachandra	3,912	2.10%	New
JMM	C. Devarajan	1,128	0.61%	New
Margin of victory		22,717	12.19%	
Total valid votes		186,347		
Rejected ballots		2	0.00%	
Registered electors		264,990		
AIADMK win (new seat)				
