= Kunnam Assembly constituency =

One of 234 State Legislative Assembly Constituencies in Tamil Nadu

Coordinates: 11.23°N 79.02°E

Kunnam
- Constituency No. 148 for the Tamil Nadu Legislative Assembly

Constituency details
- Country: India
- Region: South India
- State: Tamil Nadu
- District: Perambalur
- Lok Sabha constituency: Chidambaram
- Established: 2008
- Total electors: 2,68,155
- Reservation: None

Member of Legislative Assembly
- 17th Tamil Nadu Legislative Assembly
- Incumbent S. S. Sivasankar
- Party: DMK
- Elected year: 2026

Kunnam is a state assembly constituency in Tamil Nadu, India newly formed after constituency delimitations in 2008. Its State Assembly Constituency number is 148. It is included in Perambalur Lok Sabha constituency. It is one of the 234 State Legislative Assembly Constituencies in Tamil Nadu.

== Members of the Legislative Assembly ==
Year	Member	Party
2011	S. S. Sivasankar	Dravida Munnetra Kazhagam
2016	R. T. Ramachandran	All India Anna Dravida Munnetra Kazhagam
2021	S. S. Sivasankar	Dravida Munnetra Kazhagam
2026	S. S. Sivasankar	Dravida Munnetra Kazhagam

== Election results ==
Vote share of winning candidates
2026	37.84%
2021	47.43%
2016	38.15%
2011	46.89%

=== 2026 ===
2026 Tamil Nadu Legislative Assembly election: Kunnam
Party	Candidate	Votes	%	±%
DMK	Sivasankar.S.S	87,237	37.84	▼9.59
IJK (AIADMK)	Saranya.A	71,680	31.09	▼13.45
TVK	Revathi Muthamilselvan	59,170	25.66	New
NTK	Keerthivasan.R	7,482	3.25	▼1.02
Independent	Thanasekar.R	677	0.29	New
Naadaalum Makkal Katchi	Elangovan.K	546	0.24	New
Independent	Shajahan	541	0.23	New
Independent	Nallathambi.P	507	0.22	New
NOTA	NOTA	484	0.21	▼0.13
Independent	Vinothkumar.M	421	0.18	New
BSP	Nallusamy.K.M	409	0.18	▼0.05
Independent	Muthamilselvan.D	268	0.12	New
Independent	Udhayasuriyan.T	210	0.09	New
TVK	Raja.S.P	189	0.08	New
Independent	Sivasankaran.P	172	0.07	New
Thamizh Perarasu Katchi	Anbuthamizhan.T	149	0.06	New
Independent	Vivek.T	144	0.06	New
Independent	Saminathan.C	137	0.06	New
Independent	Chandrasekar.P	85	0.04	New
Independent	Kathiravan.A.C	62	0.03	New
Margin of victory		15,557	6.75	▲3.86
Turnout		2,30,570	85.98	▲5.85
Registered electors		2,68,155		▼5,306
DMK hold		Swing	▼9.59	

=== 2021 ===
2021 Tamil Nadu Legislative Assembly election: Kunnam
Party	Candidate	Votes	%	±%
DMK	S. S. Sivasankar	103,922	47.43%	▲18.45
AIADMK	R. T. Ramachandran	97,593	44.54%	▲6.39
NTK	P. Arul	9,354	4.27%	▲3.46
AMMK	S. Kaarthikeyan	2,118	0.97%	New
Independent	R. Selvaraju	977	0.45%	New
Independent	S. Balamurugan	934	0.43%	New
NOTA	Nota	753	0.34%	▼1.13
MNM	A. S. Sathik Basha	739	0.34%	New
Independent	M. R. Prakash	604	0.28%	New
BSP	S. Pandiyan	494	0.23%	▼0.31
Independent	M. Vinothkumar	451	0.21%	New
Margin of victory		6,329	2.89%	−6.28%
Turnout		219,126	80.13%	−0.02%
Rejected ballots		151	0.07%	
Registered electors		273,461		
DMK gain from AIADMK		Swing	9.28%	

=== 2016 ===
2016 Tamil Nadu Legislative Assembly election: Kunnam
Party	Candidate	Votes	%	±%
AIADMK	R. T. Ramachandran	78,218	38.15%	New
DMK	T. Durairaj	59,422	28.98%	▼17.91
PMK	G. Vaithilingam	37,271	18.18%	New
VCK	J. Mohamed Shanavas	19,853	9.68%	New
NOTA	None Of The Above	3,024	1.47%	New
NTK	P. Arul	1,665	0.81%	New
IJK	A. V. R. Ragupathi	1,168	0.57%	New
BSP	K. Rajendran	1,092	0.53%	▼0.34
Independent	R. Durairaj	1,055	0.51%	New
Independent	M. Ramalingam	586	0.29%	New
Independent	N. Silambarasan	566	0.28%	New
Margin of victory		18,796	9.17%	−4.00%
Turnout		205,044	80.15%	−1.76%
Registered electors		255,823		
AIADMK gain from DMK		Swing	-8.74%	

=== 2011 ===
2011 Tamil Nadu Legislative Assembly election: Kunnam
Party	Candidate	Votes	%	±%
DMK	S. S. Sivasankar	81,723	46.89%	New
DMDK	Durai. Kamaraj	58,766	33.72%	New
IJK	P. Jayaseelan	13,735	7.88%	New
Independent	P. Ponnivalavan	8,395	4.82%	New
BJP	T. Baskaran	2,509	1.44%	New
Independent	B. Ramesh	2,264	1.30%	New
BSP	K. Rajendiran	1,526	0.88%	New
JMM	G. Maruthadurai	1,433	0.82%	New
Independent	M. Kumar	1,411	0.81%	New
RJD	M. Thangavel	1,070	0.61%	New
Independent	P. Saminathan	901	0.52%	New
Margin of victory		22,957	13.17%	
Turnout		212,789	81.91%	
Registered electors		174,294		
DMK win (new seat)				
