= Joseph Samuel (politician) =

Indian politician

Member of the Tamil Nadu Legislative Assembly
- In office 12 May 2021 – 5 May 2026
- Preceded by: V. Alexander
- Succeeded by: G. Balamurugan
- Constituency: Ambattur

Personal details
- Party: Dravida Munnetra Kazhagam
- Spouse: S. Padmavathi
- Children: J. S. Jerena Christy; J. S. Vino Christy; J. S. Jerold Sylvin
- Parent: M. Joseph (father)

Joseph Samuel is an Indian Politician Member of Legislative Assembly of Tamil Nadu. He was elected from Ambattur as a Dravida Munnetra Kazhagam candidate in 2021.

== Electoral performance ==
| Election | Constituency | Political party | Result | Vote % | Opposition | | | Ref |
| Election | Constituency | Political party | Result | Vote % | Candidate | Political party | Vote % | Ref |
|---|---|---|---|---|---|---|---|---|
| 2021 | Ambattur | DMK | Won | 48.14% | V. Alexander | AIADMK | 30.43% | - |
