= Devanur =

- village
- Location in Tamil Nadu, India Devanur (India)
- Coordinates: 11°16′6″N 79°19′21″E
- Country: India
- State: Tamil Nadu
- District: Ariyalur

Government
  - Type: Panchayati raj (India)
  - Body: Gram panchayat

Population (2001)
  - Total: 1,915

Languages
  - Official: Tamil
- Time zone: UTC+5:30 (IST)
- Vehicle registration: TN-61
- Coastline: 0 kilometres (0 mi)
- Sex ratio: 987 ♂/♀
- Literacy: 60.62%

Devanur is a village in the Andimadam taluk of Ariyalur district, Tamil Nadu, India.

== Demographics ==
As per the 2001 census, Devanur had a total population of 1915 with 964 males and 951 females.

The historical name of the village is therodum devanagarapattinam.
