= R. T. Ramachandran (politician) =

Indian politician

R.T. Ramachandran is an Indian politician and Member of the 15th Legislative Assembly of Tamil Nadu from Kunnam. He was elected for the Tamil Nadu legislative assembly as an All India Anna Dravida Munnetra Kazhagam candidate from Kunnam constituency in 2016 election.
