= 2001 elections in India =

Elections in India
- 2001

Elections in the Republic of India in 2001 included elections to five state legislative assemblies and to seats in the Rajya Sabha.

== Results ==
Date(s)	State	Government before election	Chief Minister before election	Government after election	Chief Minister after election	Maps
10 May 2001	Assam	Asom Gana Parishad	Prafulla Kumar Mahanta	Indian National Congress	Tarun Gogoi	
10 May 2001	Kerala	Communist Party of India (Marxist)	E. K. Nayanar	Indian National Congress	A. K. Antony	
10 May 2001	Pondicherry	Indian National Congress	P. Shanmugham	Indian National Congress	P. Shanmugham	
10 May 2001	Pondicherry	Tamil Maanila Congress	P. Shanmugham	Tamil Maanila Congress	P. Shanmugham	
10 May 2001	Tamil Nadu	Dravida Munnetra Kazhagam	M. Karunanidhi	All India Anna Dravida Munnetra Kazhagam	J. Jayalalithaa	
10 May 2001	West Bengal	Communist Party of India (Marxist)	Buddhadeb Bhattacharya	Communist Party of India (Marxist)	Buddhadeb Bhattacharya	

== Legislative Assembly elections ==
=== Assam ===
Party	Votes	%	Seats	+/–
Indian National Congress	4,230,676	39.75	71	▲37
Asom Gana Parishad	2,130,118	20.02	20	▼39
Bharatiya Janata Party	995,004	9.35	8	▲4
Nationalist Congress Party	267,173	2.51	3	▲1
Autonomous State Demand Committee	118,610	1.11	2	▼3
Samajwadi Party	109,822	1.03	1	New
Samata Party	83,815	0.79	1	New
All India Trinamool Congress	58,361	0.55	1	New
Communist Party of India (Marxist)	189,349	1.78	0	▼2
Communist Party of India	116,889	1.10	0	▼3
Autonomous State Demand Committee (Progressive)	98,032	0.92	0	New
United Minorities Front, Assam	43,712	0.41	0	▼2
People's Democratic Front (India)	35,147	0.33	0	New
Others	88,626	0.83	0	0
Independents	2,076,653	19.51	19	▲8
Total	10,641,987	100.00	126	▲4
Valid votes	10,641,987	98.26		
Invalid/blank votes	188,628	1.74		
Total votes	10,830,615	100.00		
Registered voters/turnout	14,439,167	75.01		
Source: ECI

=== Kerala ===
Party-wise vote share of 2001 Kerala Assembly Elections
Sl.No:	Party	Contested	Won	Popular Votes	Share (%)
1	Indian National Congress- Indira (Congress-I)	88	63	4940868	31.4
2	Communist Party of India (Marxist) (CPI(M))	74	24	3752976	23.85
3	Indian Union Muslim League (IUML)	23	16	1259572	8
4	Kerala Congress - Mani (KCM)	11	9	556647	3.54
5	Communist Party of India (CPI)	24	7	1212248	7.7
6	Janadhipatya Samrakshana Samithi (JSS)	5	4	279831	1.78
7	Janata Dal- Secular (JDS)	10	3	546917	3.48
8	Kerala Congress - Joseph (KCJ)	10	2	455748	2.9
9	Nationalist Congress Party (NCP)	9	2	408456	2.6
10	Revolutionary Socialist Party (RSP)	6	2	269689	1.71
11	Revolutionary Socialist Party - Bolshevik (RSPB)	4	2	215562	1.37
12	Kerala Congress - Jacob (KCA)	4	2	207618	1.32
13	Kerala Congress - Balakrishna Pillai (KCB)	2	2	113915	0.72
14	Communist Marxist Party (CMP)	3	1	145441	0.92
15	Indian National League (INL)	3	0	139775	0.89
16	CPI(M) Independents (LDF)	2	0	91058	0.58
17	Bharatiya Janata Party (BJP)	123	0	789762	5.02
18	BJP Allies (JD(U): 4, Samata: 2, DMK: 1)	7	0	10089	0.06
19	Others/ Independents	266	1	340692	2.16
Total		676	140	15736894	100

=== Puducherry ===
Party	Votes	%	Seats	+/–
Indian National Congress	108,700	22.78	11	▲2
Dravida Munnetra Kazhagam	83,679	17.54	7	0
All India Anna Dravida Munnetra Kazhagam	59,926	12.56	3	0
Puducherry Makkal Congress	48,865	10.24	4	New
Tamil Maanila Congress	35,390	7.42	2	▼3
Bharatiya Janata Party	22,164	4.65	1	▲1
Others	66,981	14.04	0	0
Independents	51,402	10.77	2	0
Total	477,107	100.00	30	0
Valid votes	477,107	99.95		
Invalid/blank votes	252	0.05		
Total votes	477,359	100.00		
Registered voters/turnout	658,647	72.48		
Source: ECI

=== Tamil Nadu ===
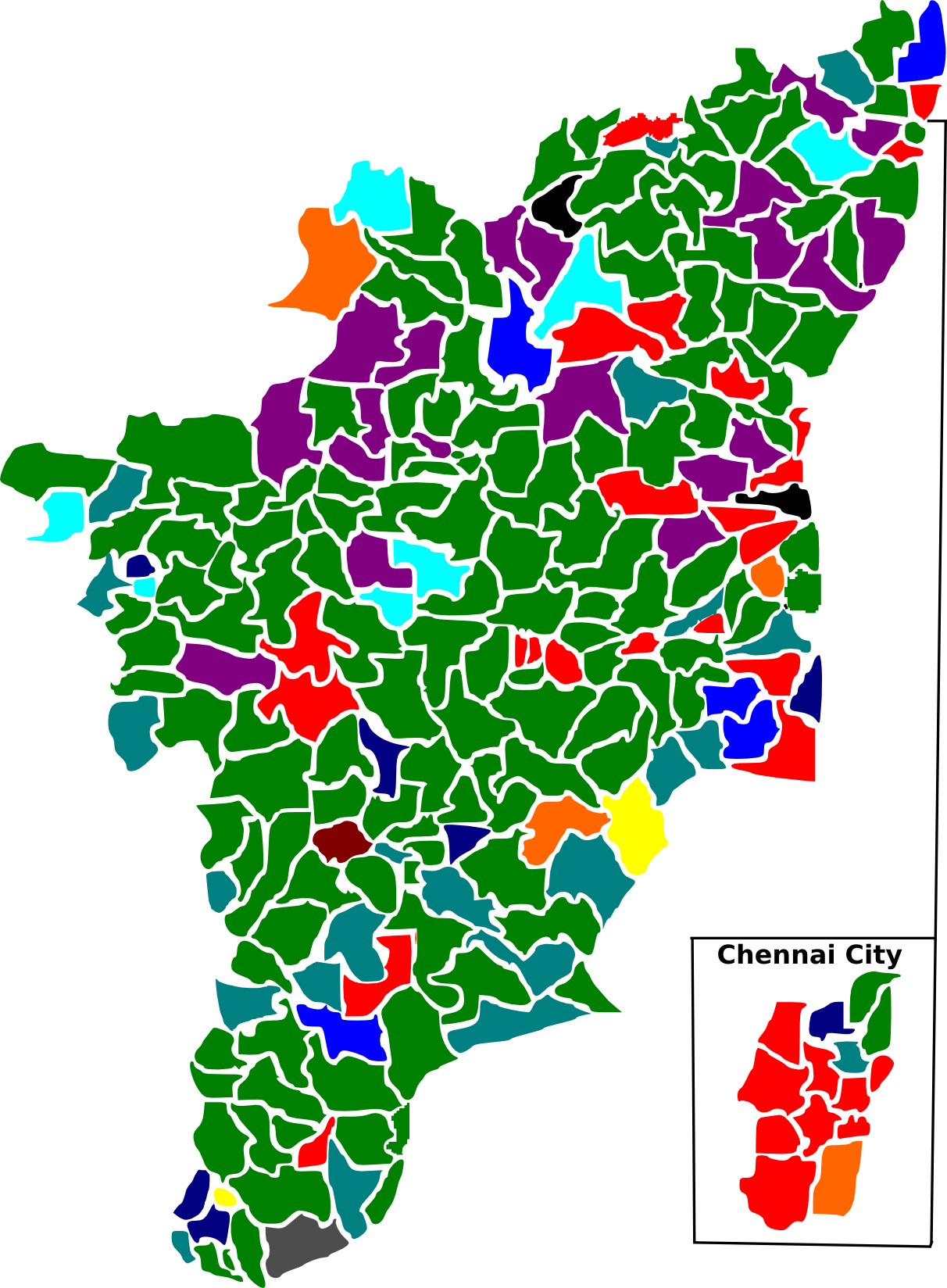
Election map of results based on parties. Colours are based on the results table on the left

Summary of the 2001 May Assembly election results in Tamil Nadu
Alliance/Party	Seats won	Change	Popular Vote	Vote %	Adj. %^{‡}
AIADMK+ alliance	196	+138	14,043,980	50.1%	
AIADMK	132	+127	8,815,387	31.4%	52.1%
TMC(M)	23	-15	1,885,726	6.7%	47.5%
PMK	20	+16	1,557,500	5.6%	46.8%
INC	7	+7	696,205	2.5%	45.4%
CPI(M)	6	+4	470,736	1.7%	48.2%
CPI	5	-3	444,710	1.6%	48.5%
IND	2	+2	103,971	0.4%	46.6%
AIFB	1	+1	39,248	0.1%	43.3%
MUL	0	-1	30,497	0.1%	41.7%
DMK+ alliance	37	-138	10,841,157	38.7%	
DMK	31	-142	8,669,864	30.9%	39.0%
BJP	4	+3	895,352	3.2%	38.7%
MADMK	2	+1	129,474	0.5%	37.1%
PT	0	–	355,171	1.3%	33.8%
MTD	0	–	257,126	0.9%	40.9%
PNK	0	–	196,740	0.7%	33.6%
MGRK	0	–	136,916	0.5%	40.8%
TB	0	–	45,002	0.2%	40.0%
CNMK	0	–	40,421	0.1%	32.4%
IND	0	–	115,091	0.4%	36.7%
Others	1	–	3,192,598	11.4%	
MDMK	0	–	1,304,469	4.7%	5.1%
IND	1	–	1,509,378	6.2%	6.3%
Total	234	–	28,037,314	100%	–

Note: Parties that contested under "rising-sun" or "two-leaves" symbol are listed as DMK or AIADMK respectively. Parties that ran their candidates as independents, (e.g. Indian Uzhavar Uzhaippalar Katchi and Thondar Congress in DMK alliance) are listed as IND for their respective alliance.
‡: Vote % reflects the percentage of votes the party received compared to the entire electorate that voted in this election. Adjusted (Adj.) Vote %, reflects the average % of votes the party received per constituency that they contested.
Sources: Election Commission of India and Rediff Newspaper

=== West Bengal ===
Summary of results of the West Bengal Legislative Assembly election, 2001
Political Party	No. of candidates	No. of elected	Number of Votes	% of Votes	Seat change
Communist Party of India (Marxist)	211	143	13,402,603	36.59%	
All India Trinamool Congress	226	60	11,229,396	30.66%	
Indian National Congress	60	26	2,921,151	7.98%	
All India Forward Bloc	34	25	2,067,944	5.65%	
Revolutionary Socialist Party	23	17	1,256,951	3.43%	
Communist Party of India	13	7	655,237	1.79%	
West Bengal Socialist Party	4	4	246,407	0.67%	
Gorkha National Liberation Front	5	3	190,057	0.52%	
Biplobi Bangla Congress	1	1	62,611	0.09%	
Independents	530	9	1,848,830	5.05%	
Total	1676	294	36,626,099		
