= 2001 Tamil Nadu Legislative Assembly election =

Indian election

- 10 May 2001

All 234 seats in the Legislature of Tamil Nadu 118 seats needed for a majority
- Opinion polls
- Turnout: 59.07% (▼7.88%)
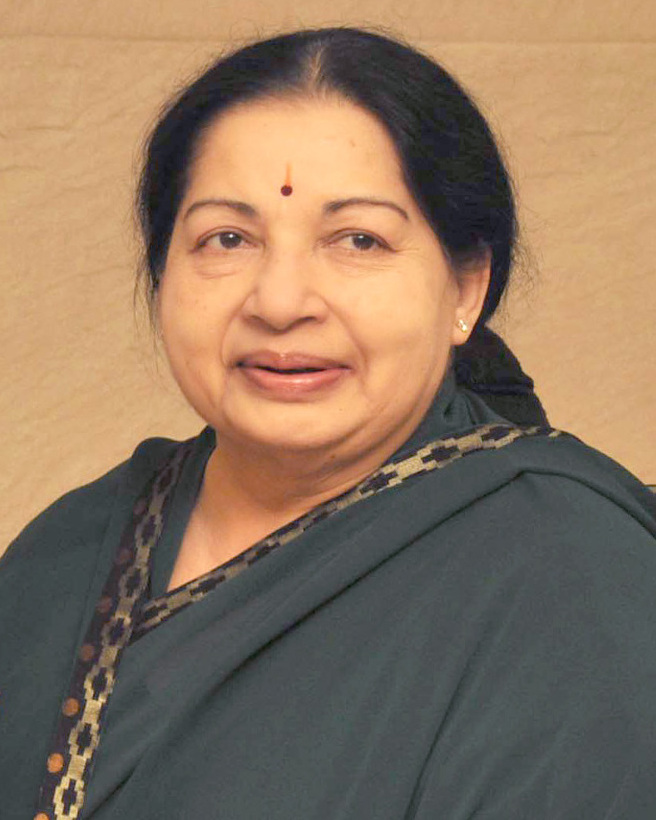

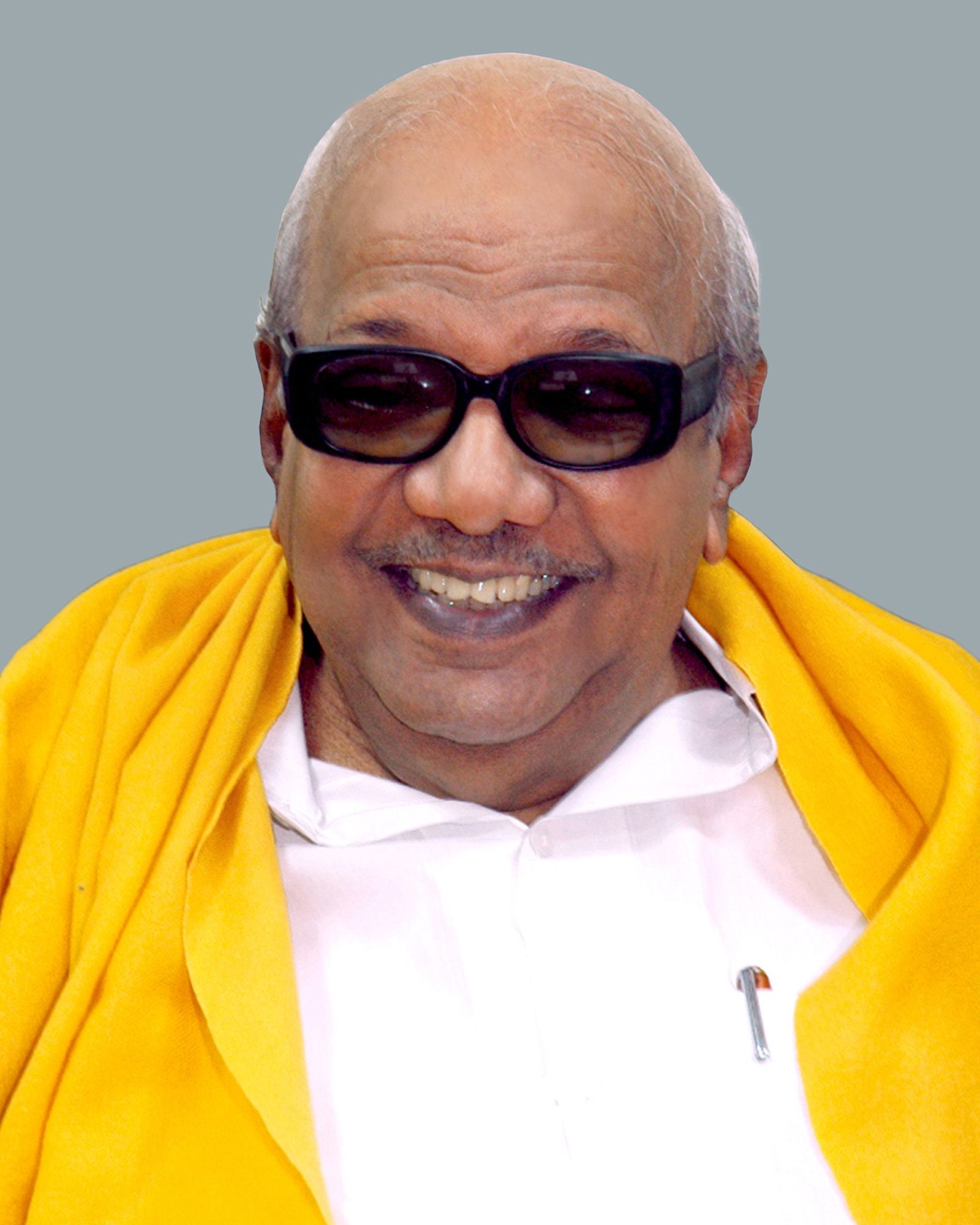
	First party	Second party
Leader	J. Jayalalithaa	M. Karunanidhi
Party	AIADMK	DMK
Alliance	SDPF	NDA
Leader's seat	Andipatti	Chepauk
Seats won	132	31
Seat change	▲127	▼142
Popular vote	8,815,387	8,669,864
Percentage	31.4%	30.9%
Swing	▲9.93%	▼11.07%
Alliance seats	196	37
Alliance seat change	▲138	▼138
Alliance popular vote	14,043,980	10,841,157
Alliance percentage	50.1%	38.7%
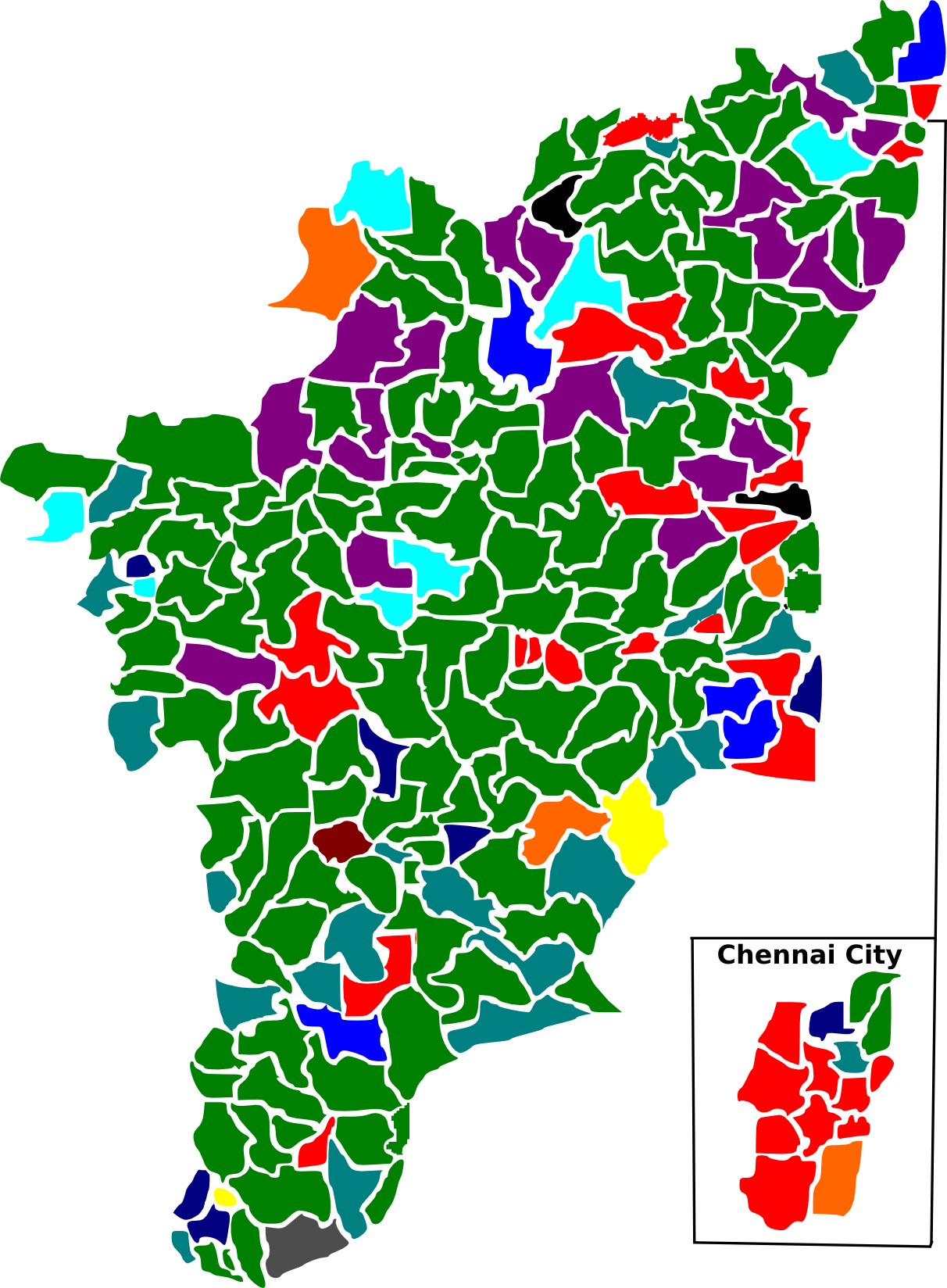
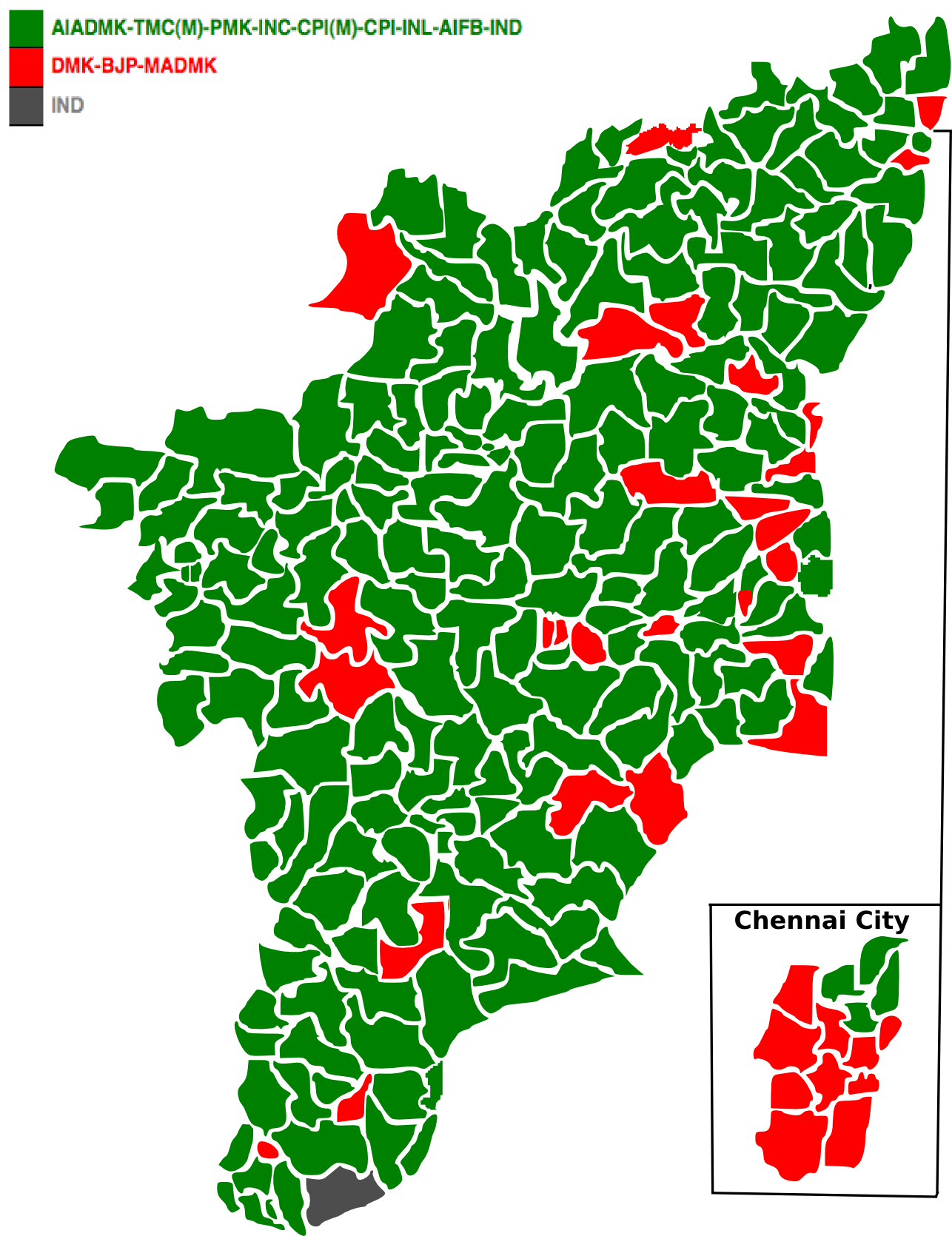

- Alliance wise Result
Chief Minister before election
M. Karunanidhi
DMK
Elected Chief Minister
J. Jayalalithaa
AIADMK

The twelfth legislative assembly election was held on 10 May 2001 in the Indian state of Tamil Nadu. All India Anna Dravida Munnetra Kazhagam (AIADMK)-led front won the elections and its general secretary, J. Jayalalithaa was sworn in as Chief Minister, even though she could not legally run as MLA in this election. She was unanimously elected as the leader of the 132-member AIADMK Legislative Party, and was subsequently nominated as Chief Minister by the party, preparing to assume office for her second term. The AIADMK-led front won a decisive victory, securing 196 constituencies. The AIADMK alone achieved a simple majority with 132 seats, enabling it to form the government without coalition support. The DMK won 31 seats and Its NDA allies won 6 seats. Political analysts attributed the results primarily to alliance arithmetic, with the broad coalition led by the AIADMK playing a decisive role in securing victory over the Incumbent DMK. 15 ministers from the outgoing Karunanidhi cabinet were defeated in their respective constituencies.

Due to criminal and corruption charges from Jayalalithaa's first term, on 21 September 2001, a five-judge constitutional bench of the Supreme Court of India ruled in a unanimous verdict that "a person who is convicted for a criminal offense and sentenced to imprisonment for not less than two years cannot be appointed the Chief Minister of a State under Article 164 (1) read with (4) and cannot continue to function as such". Thereby, the bench decided that "in the appointment of Dr. J. Jayalalithaa as Chief Minister there has been a clear infringement of a Constitutional provision and that a writ of quo warranto must issue". In effect, her appointment as Chief Minister was declared null and invalid with retrospective effect. Therefore, technically, she was not the Chief Minister in the period between 14 May 2001 and 21 September 2001. After her resignation on 21 September 2001, she put in O. Panneerselvam, as the official 13th Chief Minister of Tamil Nadu, until she could clear up the charges from her first term, so she can take up the mantle of Chief Minister officially, on 2 March 2002.

== Schedule ==
Event	Date
Date for Nominations	16 April 2001
Last Date for filing Nominations	23 April 2001
Date for scrutiny of nominations	24 April 2001
Last date for withdrawal of candidatures	26 April 2001
Date of poll	10 May 2001
Date of counting	13 May 2001

== Background and Coalition ==
The incumbent party, Dravida Munnetra Kazhagam, finished its full 5 terms, for the first time since winning the 1971 state assembly election. According to various sources and exit polls, the incumbent party was expexted to retain power, due to the popularity of its leader M. Karunanidhi. Due to the anti-incumbency factor, problems of development cited by the people in many rural areas of Tamil Nadu, and a broad coalition formed by AIADMK, including Tamil Maanila Congress, who left the alliance of Dravida Munnetra Kazhagam (DMK), because they joined BJP and the National Democratic Alliance (NDA), Pattali Makkal Katchi (PMK), Indian National Congress and the left parties, the AIADMK-led front, with its general secretary J. Jayalalithaa, won by a landslide, sweeping across the state. In this election, J. Jayalalithaa described the contest as a “life-and-death battle” for her political future.

On 24 April 2001, the nomination papers of ADMK General Secretary Jayalalithaa for Bargur and Andipatti, filed on 18 April, along with nominations filed on her behalf in Pudukkottai and Bhuvanagiri minutes before the April 23 deadline, were rejected during scrutiny due to her conviction in the TANSI land deal case.Under Section 8(3) of the Representation of the People Act, 1951, her sentence disqualified J. Jayalalithaa from contesting. Some critics, however, argued that filing multiple nominations was aimed at projecting their rejection as part of a conspiracy involving Chief Minister M. Karunanidhi. In response, Chief Minister Karunanidhi, who had earlier indicated that her nominations might be rejected, remarked: “There is nothing for me to rejoice about. The law has taken its course". Senior advocate Siddhartha Shankar Ray and M. Thambidurai represented her before the Returning Officer at Krishnagiri, and her dummy candidates became the official AIADMK nominees of those seats. Following the rejection, Jayalalithaa campaigned from an open vehicle in Pudukkottai, accusing Karunanidhi of conspiracy, stating: “conspiring Karunanidhi” and alleging he pressured officials to block her candidature to promote his son M. K. Stalin. She declared: “It’s time we put an end to his efforts to establish a dynasty.” Despite her disqualification, she told voters: “I have faith in you and only you can give the final verdict. you should consider that I am contesting in all the 141 constituencies where the AIADMK has put up candidates.” She also invoked lines from a Tamil film song from the 1971 film Rickshawkaran starring her mentor MGR: “Angey sirippavargal sirikkattum. adhu aanava sirippu. nalla theerppai ulagam sollum naal varumpothu, angey sirippavar yaar azhubavar yaar theriyum appothu” (“Let those who laugh there, laugh. it is the laughter of arrogance; when the world delivers the true verdict, it will be known who laughs and who weeps”). The episode significantly shaped the political narrative of the election, with Jayalalithaa portraying herself as a victim of a political conspiracy, a stance that drew continued support and sympathy from her alliance partners and sections of the electorate.

== Seat allotments ==
Source: Various Sources

=== Secular Democratic Progressive Alliance ===
Secular Democratic Progressive Alliance
Party	Flag	Symbol	Leader	Seats contested	
All India Anna Dravida Munnetra Kazhagam			J. Jayalalithaa	140	141
Tamizhaga Makkal Munnetra Kazhagam			B. John Pandian	1	141
Tamil Maanila Congress (Moopanar)			G. K. Moopanar	31	32
Republican Party of India			C. K. Thamizharasan	1	32
Pattali Makkal Katchi			S. Ramadoss	27	
Indian National Congress			E. V. K. S. Elangovan	14	
Communist Party of India (Marxist)			N. Sankaraiah	8	
Communist Party of India			R. Nallakannu	8	
All India Forward Bloc			L. Santhanam	1	
Indian National League			M. Abdul Lathief	1	
Indian Union Muslim League			K. M. Kader Mohideen	1	
Independent			P. S. Arul	1	
Total				234	

=== DMK–NDA Alliance ===
National Democratic Alliance (Note: Some Parties may have same symbol as they were unrecognized parties so they may have same symbol.)
Party	Flag	Symbol	Leader	Seats contested	
Dravida Munnetra Kazhagam			M. Karunanidhi	167	183
Viduthalai Chiruthaigal Katchi			Thol. Thirumavalavan	8	183
Tamizhaga Muslim Iykkya Jamaat			J. M. Aaroon Rashid	3	183
TMC Jananayaka Peravai			P. Chidambaram	2	183
Tamil Pattali Makkal Katchi			Dheeran	1	183
Tamil Nadu Mutharaiyar Sangam			Kuzha Chelliah	1	183
All India Moovendar Munnani Kazhagam			Dr. Sethuraman	1	183
Bharatiya Janata Party			S. P. Kripanidhi	21	
Puthiya Tamilagam			K. Krishnasamy	10	
Makkal Tamil Desam Katchi			S. Kannappan	6	
Puthiya Needhi Katchi (Note: PNK Contested Television Symbol on Thiruvallur, Arani, Rishivandiyam, Sholingur and Bus Symbol on Bhavani constituencies)			A. C. Shanmugam	5	
MGR Anna Dravida Munnetra Kazhagam			Su. Thirunavukkarasar	3	
MGR Kazhagam (Note: MGRK Contested Television Symbol on Alandur and Bus Symbol on Natrampalli constituencies)			R. M. Veerappan	2	
Kongunadu Makkal Katchi			A. M. Raja	1	
Uzhavar Uzhaippalar Katchi			'Vettavalam' Manikandan	1	
Thondar Congress			Kumari Ananthan	1	
Thamilar Bhoomi			Ku. Pa. Krishnan	1	
Total				234	

=== MDMK ===
Marumalarchi Dravida Munnetra Kazhagam
Party	Flag	Symbol	Leader	Seats contested
Marumalarchi Dravida Munnetra Kazhagam			Vaiko	211 (Note: Due to a seat-sharing dispute within the NDA alliance, the party contested independently in the state. However, since it remained part of the NDA at the national level, it did not field candidates in 21 constituencies where the BJP was contesting.)

== List of Candidates ==
Constituency		AIADMK+		DMK+	
#	Name	Party	Candidate	Party	Candidate
1	Royapuram	ADMK	D. Jayakumar	DMK	K. Nargunan
2	Harbour	CPI	D. Pandian	DMK	K. Anbazhagan
3	Dr. R. K. Nagar	ADMK	P. K. Sekar Babu	DMK	S. P. Sarguna Pandian
4	Park Town	TMC	S. G. Vinayakamurthi	DMK	T. Rajendar
5	Perambur (SC)	CPI(M)	K. Mahendran	DMK	Chengai Sivam
6	Purasawalkam	TMC	P. Vetrivel	DMK	B. Ranganathan (Note: Tamil Maanila Congress Jananayaka Peravai contested on the "Rising Sun" symbol of the Dravida Munnetra Kazhagam (DMK), and is officially recorded as a DMK candidate in electoral records.)
7	Egmore (SC)	ADMK	B. John Pandian (Note: Tamizhaga Makkal Munnetra Kazhagam contested on the "Two Leaves" symbol of the All India Anna Dravida Munnetra Kazhagam (AIADMK), and is officially recorded as a AIADMK candidate in electoral records.)	DMK	Parithi Ilamvazhuthi
8	Anna Nagar	PMK	C. Arumugam	DMK	Arcot N. Veeraswami
9	Theagaraya Nagar	ADMK	Sulochana Sampath	DMK	J. Anbazhagan
10	Thousand Lights	TMC	S. Sekar	DMK	M. K. Stalin
11	Chepauk	INC	R. Damodharan	DMK	M. Karunanidhi
12	Triplicane	INC	S. Rajakumar	DMK	S. A. M. Hussain
13	Mylapore	ADMK	V. Maitreyan	BJP	K. N. Lakshmanan
14	Saidapet	PMK	C. R. Baskaran	DMK	V. Perumal
15	Gummidipundi	ADMK	K. Sudarsanam	DMK	K. Venu
16	Ponneri (SC)	CPI	A. S. Kannan	DMK	K. Sundaram
17	Thiruvottiyur	ADMK	T. Arumugam	IND	Kumari Ananthan
18	Villivakkam	TMC	A. Chellakumar	DMK	D. Nepoleon
19	Alandur	ADMK	B. Valarmathi	MGRK	Eraama Veerappan
20	Tambaram	TMC	K. Chakkaraipani Reddiar	DMK	M. A. Vaithyalingam
21	Tirupporur (SC)	ADMK	S. Kanitha Sampath	DMK	C. Nagarajan
22	Chengalpattu	PMK	K. Arumugam	DMK	V. Viswanathan
23	Maduranthakam	ADMK	P. Vasudevan	DMK	S. D. Ugamchand
24	Acharapakkam (SC)	PMK	A. Selvaraj	DMK	Dr. T. Murugesan
25	Uthiramerur	ADMK	V. Somasundaram	DMK	K. Sundar
26	Kancheepuram	ADMK	S. S. Thirunavukkarasu	DMK	A. Sekar
27	Sriperumbudur (SC)	INC	D. Yasodha	DMK	M. Raghavan
28	Poonamallee	PMK	S. Shanmugam	DMK	S. Chezhiyan
29	Tiruvallur	TMC	D. Sudarsanam	PNK	V. G. Raajendran
30	Tiruttani	PMK	G. Raviraj	DMK	E. A. P. Sivaji
31	Pallipet	ADMK	P. M. Narasimhan	BJP	M. Chakravarthy
32	Arkonam (SC)	ADMK	K. Bhavani Karunakaran	DMK	R. Ravishankar
33	Sholinghur	ADMK	R. Vilvanathan	PNK	A. M. Ponnuranga
34	Ranipet	ADMK	M. S. Chandrasekaran	DMK	R. Gandhi
35	Arcot	ADMK	P. Neelakandan	DMK	A. K. Sundaramoorthy
36	Katpadi	PMK	A. K. Natarajan	DMK	Durai Murugan
37	Gudiyatham	ADMK	C. M. Suryakala	DMK	S. Duraisamy
38	Pernambut (SC)	ADMK	C. Kanagathara	BJP	S. Thondral Nayagan
39	Vaniyambadi	IND	M. Abdul Lathief	DMK	J. M. Aaroon Rashid (Note: Muslim Iyakka Jamaat contested on the "Rising Sun" symbol of the Dravida Munnetra Kazhagam (DMK), and is officially recorded as a DMK candidate in electoral records.)
40	Natrampalli	PMK	S. Natarajan	MGRK	T. Anbazhagan
41	Tiruppattur	PMK	T. K. Raja	DMK	S. Arasu
42	Chengam (SC)	INC	Polur Varadhan	MTD	R. Shamala
43	Thandarambattu	TMC	K. Manivarma	DMK	E. V. Velu
44	Tiruvannamalai	PMK	M. Shunmugasundaram	DMK	K. Pitchandi
45	Kalasapakkam	ADMK	S. Ramachandran	DMK	P. S. Thiruvengadam
46	Polur	ADMK	Nalini Manokaran	DMK	C. Elumalai
47	Anaicut	ADMK	K. Pandurangan	DMK	G. Malarvizhi
48	Vellore	TMC	C. Gnanasekharan	DMK	A. M. Ramalingam
49	Arni	ADMK	K. Ramachandran	PNK	A. C. Shanmugam
50	Cheyyar	PMK	P. S. Ulagarakhshagan	DMK	R. K. P. Rajarajan
51	Vandavasi (SC)	PMK	K. Murugavelrajan	DMK	K. Loganathan
52	Peranamallur	ADMK	A. K. S. Anbalagan	MTD	B. Bose
53	Melmalayanur	ADMK	R. Tamilmozhi	DMK	Dr. A. Gnanasekaran
54	Gingee	ADMK	V. Elumalai	DMK	Dheeran (Note: Tamil Pattali Makkal Katchi contested on the "Rising Sun" symbol of the Dravida Munnetra Kazhagam (DMK), and is officially recorded as a DMK candidate in electoral records.)
55	Tindivanam	ADMK	C. V. Shanmugam	DMK	R. Sedunathan
56	Vanur (SC)	ADMK	N. Ganapathy	DMK	R. Mydili
57	Kandamangalam (SC)	ADMK	V. Subramanian	DMK	E. Vijayaragavan (Note: Viduthalai Chiruthaigal Katchi contested on the "Rising Sun" symbol of the Dravida Munnetra Kazhagam (DMK), and is officially recorded as a DMK candidate in electoral records.)
58	Villupuram	PMK	R. Pasupathy	DMK	K. Ponmudy
59	Mugaiyur	ADMK	G. Gothandaram	DMK	A. G. Sampath
60	Thirunavalur	ADMK	K. G. P. Gnanamoorthy	DMK	A. J. Manikannan
61	Ulundurpet (SC)	ADMK	N. Ramu	DMK	K. Thirunavukkarasu
62	Nellikuppam	ADMK	M. C. Sampath	DMK	V. C. Shanmugham
63	Cuddalore	TMC	P. R. S. Venkatesan	DMK	E. Pugazhendi
64	Panruti	PMK	T. Velmurugan	DMK	V. Ramaswamy
65	Kurinjipadi	ADMK	K. Sivasubramanian	DMK	M. R. K. Panneerselvam
66	Bhuvanagiri	IND	P. S. Arul	MTD	M. Gopalakrishnan
67	Kattumannarkoil (SC)	INC	R. Sachithanandam	DMK	P. Vallalperuman
68	Chidambaram	PMK	T. Arivuselvan	DMK	K. Saravanan Durai
69	Vridhachalam	PMK	R. Govindasamy	DMK	Kuzhandai Tamizharasan
70	Mangalore (SC)	TMC	S. Puratchimani	DMK	Thol. Thirumavalavan
71	Rishivandiam	TMC	S. Sivaraj	PNK	T. K. T. Murali
72	Chinnasalem	ADMK	P. Mohan	DMK	R. Mookkappan
73	Sankarapuram	PMK	P. Kasampu	DMK	T. Udhayasuriyan
74	Hosur	INC	K. Gopinath	BJP	B. Venkataswamy
75	Thalli	CPI	S. Raja Reddy	BJP	K. V. Muralidharan
76	Kaveripattinam	ADMK	K. P. Munusamy	DMK	V. C. Govindasamy
77	Krishnagiri	ADMK	V. Govindarasu	DMK	T. Senguttuvan
78	Bargur	ADMK	M. Thambidurai	DMK	E. G. Sugavanam
79	Harur (SC)	CPI	V. Krishnamoorthy	DMK	D. Periyasamy
80	Morappur	ADMK	P. Palaniappan	DMK	E. V. Rajasekaran
81	Palacode	ADMK	K. P. Anbalagan	DMK	G. L. Venkatachalam
82	Dharmapuri	PMK	K. Pary Mohan	DMK	K. Manokaran
83	Pennagaram	PMK	G. K. Mani	DMK	M. Kumar
84	Mettur	ADMK	S. Sundarambal	DMK	P. Gopal
85	Taramangalam	PMK	M. P. Kamaraj	DMK	S. Ammashi
86	Omalur	ADMK	S. Semmalai	DMK	Era. Rajendran
87	Yercaud (ST)	ADMK	K. T. Elayakannu	BJP	K. Govindan
88	Salem-I	ADMK	Se. Venkatajalam	DMK	M. A. Elangovan
89	Salem-II	PMK	M. Karthe	DMK	A. L. Thangavel
90	Veerapandi	ADMK	S. K. Selvam	DMK	S. Arumugam
91	Panamarathupatty	ADMK	P. Vijayalakshmi	DMK	S. R. Sivalingam
92	Attur	ADMK	A. K. Murugesan	DMK	Mu. Ra. Karunanidhi
93	Talavasal (SC)	ADMK	V. Alagammal	DMK	M. Pandiyarajan
94	Rasipuram	ADMK	P. R. Sundaram	DMK	K. P. Ramalingam
95	Sendamangalam (ST)	ADMK	K. Kalavathi	DMK	C. Chandrasekaran
96	Namakkal (SC)	INC	K. Jeyakumar	PT	S. Ahilan
97	Kapilamalai	PMK	A. R. Malaiyappasamy	DMK	S. Gandhiselvan
98	Tiruchengode	ADMK	C. Ponnaiyan	DMK	T. P. Arumugam
99	Sankari (SC)	ADMK	P. Dhanapal	DMK	T. R. Saravanan
100	Edapadi	PMK	I. Ganesan	DMK	A. Kandasamy
101	Mettupalayam	ADMK	A. K. Selvaraj	DMK	B. Arun Kumar
102	Avanashi (SC)	ADMK	S. Mahalingam	DMK	Thirumathi Radhamani
103	Thondamuthur	TMC	S. R. Balasubramaniam	DMK	Tmt. V. R. Sukanya
104	Singanallur	CPI(M)	K. C. Karunakaran	DMK	N. Palanisamy
105	Coimbatore West	INC	S. Maheswari	DMK	C. T. Dhandapani
106	Coimbatore East	TMC	V. K. Lakshmanan	BJP	N. R. Nanjappan
107	Perur	ADMK	M. A. Krishnakumar	DMK	N. Nageswari
108	Kinathukadavu	ADMK	S. Damodaran	DMK	M. Shanmugham
109	Pollachi	ADMK	V. Jayaraman	DMK	R. Tamil Mani
110	Valparai (SC)	TMC	N. Kovaithangam	PT	K. Krishnasamy
111	Udumalpet	ADMK	C. Shanmugavelu	DMK	D. Selvaraj
112	Dharapuram (SC)	PMK	V. Sivakami	DMK	R. Sareswathi
113	Vellakoil	ADMK	V. P. Periasamy	DMK	M. P. Saminathan
114	Pongalur	ADMK	P. V. Damodaran	IND	K. Chellamuthu
115	Palladam	ADMK	S. M. Velusamy	DMK	S. S. Ponmudi
116	Tiruppur	ADMK	C. Sivasamy	BJP	Lalitha K.
117	Kangayam	ADMK	Tmt. M. Selvi	DMK	N. Rajkumar Manradiyar
118	Modakurichi	ADMK	P. C. Ramasami	DMK	S. Jagadeesan
119	Perundurai	ADMK	K. S. Palanisamy	CNMK	N. Govindaswamy
120	Erode	ADMK	K. S. Thennarasu	DMK	N. K. K. Periyasamy
121	Bhavani	ADMK	K. C. Karuppannan	PNK	J. Sudhanandhen
122	Andhiyur (SC)	PMK	R. Krishnan	DMK	P. Selvarasu
123	Gobichettipalayam	ADMK	S. S. Ramanitharan	DMK	V. P. Shanmugasundram
124	Bhavanisagar	ADMK	P. Chithambaram	DMK	O. Subramaniam
125	Sathyamangalam	ADMK	K. R. Kandasamy	DMK	S. K. Rajendran
126	Coonoor (SC)	TMC	K. Kandasamy	DMK	E. M. Mahaliappan
127	Ootacamund	INC	H. M. Raju	BJP	J. Hutchigowder
128	Gudalur	ADMK	A. Miller	DMK	M. Pandiaraj
129	Palani (SC)	ADMK	M. Chinnasamy	DMK	T. Poovendhan
130	Oddanchatram	ADMK	A. T. Sellasamy	DMK	Ara. Chakkarapani
131	Periyakulam	ADMK	O. Panneerselvam	DMK	M. Abuthahir
132	Theni	ADMK	D. Ganesan	DMK	L. Mookaiah
133	Bodinayakkanur	ADMK	S. Ramaraj	DMK	A. Sudalaimuthu
134	Cumbum	TMC	O. R. Ramachandran	BJP	N. K. R. Krishnakumar
135	Andipatti	ADMK	Thanga Tamil Selvan	DMK	P. Aasiyan
136	Sedapatti	ADMK	C. Durairaj	PT	P. V. Bakthavatchalam
137	Thirumangalam	ADMK	K. Kalimuthu	DMK	T. Ocha Thevar (Note: All India Moovendar Munnani Kazhagam contested on the "Rising Sun" symbol of the Dravida Munnetra Kazhagam (DMK), and is officially recorded as a DMK candidate in electoral records.)
138	Usilampatti	AIFB	L. Santhanam	DMK	S. O. Ramasamy
139	Nilakottai (SC)	ADMK	G. Anbazhagan	PT	K. Ayyar
140	Sholavandan	ADMK	V. R. Rajangam	DMK	P. Moorthy
141	Tirupparankundram	ADMK	S. M. Seenivel	DMK	C. Ramachandran
142	Madurai West	ADMK	Valarmathi Jebaraj	DMK	P. T. R. Palanivel Rajan
143	Madurai Central	TMC	M. A. Hakeem	DMK	S. Paulraj
144	Madurai East	CPI(M)	N. Nanmaran	DMK	V. Velusamy
145	Samayanallur (SC)	ADMK	P. Ponnampalam	DMK	Kasthuri Sivasamy
146	Melur	ADMK	Melur R. Samy	DMK	S. Samayanallur Selavarasu
147	Natham	ADMK	R. Viswanathan	TMB (Note: Thamilar Bhoomi)	Ku. Pa. Krishnan
148	Dindigul	CPI(M)	K. Nagalakshmi	DMK	M. Basheer Ahmed
149	Athoor	ADMK	P. K. T. Natarajan	DMK	I. Periasamy
150	Vedasandur	ADMK	P. Andivel	DMK	R. Kavitha Parthipan
151	Aravakurichi	ADMK	E. A. Liyaudeen Sait	DMK	Tmt. Lakshmi Duraisamy
152	Karur	INC	T. N. Sivasubramanian	DMK	Vasuki Murugesan
153	Krishnarayapuram (SC)	ADMK	R. Sasikala	DMK	S. Periyasamy
154	Marungapuri	ADMK	V. A. Chelliah	DMK	B. M. Senguttuvan
155	Kulithalai	ADMK	A. Pappa Sundaram	DMK	D. Thirunavukkarasu
156	Thottiam	ADMK	P. Annavi	DMK	K. Kannaiyan
157	Uppiliapuram (ST)	ADMK	R. Saroja	DMK	R. Rani
158	Musiri	ADMK	C. Malliga	DMK	S. Vivekanandan
159	Lalgudi	ADMK	S. M. Balan	DMK	K. N. Nehru
160	Perambalur (SC)	ADMK	P. Rajarathnam	DMK	S. Vallaban
161	Varahur (SC)	ADMK	A. Arunachalam	DMK	K. Thiruvalluvar
162	Ariyalur	ADMK	P. Elavazhagan	DMK	T. A. Kathiravan
163	Andimadam	PMK	J. Guru	DMK	M. Gnanamoorthy
164	Jayankondam	ADMK	S. Annadurai	DMK	K. C. Ganesan
165	Srirangam	ADMK	K. K. Balasubramanian	BJP	M. Soundarapandian
166	Tiruchirappalli-I	IUML	K. M. Kader Mohideen	DMK	B. Paranikumar
167	Tiruchirappalli-II	INC	P. C. Selvaraj	DMK	Anbil Periyasamy
168	Thiruverumbur	CPI(M)	T. K. Rangarajan	DMK	K. N. Sekaran
169	Sirkali (SC)	ADMK	N. Chandramohan	DMK	Tmt. J. Irai Ezhil
170	Poompuhar	ADMK	N. Renganathan	DMK	M. Mohammed Siddiq
171	Mayuram	ADMK	R. Selvaraj	BJP	Jaga Veerapandian
172	Kuttalam	ADMK	Natarajan	DMK	P. Kalyanam
173	Nannilam (SC)	TMC	C. K. Tamizharasan (Note: Republican Party of India contested on the "Cycle" symbol of the Tamil Maanila Congress (Moopanar) (TMC(M)), and is officially recorded as a TMC(M) candidate in electoral records.)	DMK	P. Sakthivel
174	Tiruvarur (SC)	CPI(M)	K. Rengasamy	DMK	A. Asokan
175	Nagapattinam	ADMK	R. Jeevanantham	DMK	S. P. Thangaiya
176	Vedaranyam	CPI	R. Mutharasan	DMK	S. K. Vedarathinam
177	Tiruthuraipundi (SC)	CPI	G. Palanisamy	DMK	M. Poonguzhali
178	Mannargudi	CPI	V. Sivapunniam	BJP	S. Gnanasekaran
179	Pattukkottai	TMC	N. R. Rengarajan	DMK	P. Balasubramanian
180	Peravurani	TMC	S. V. T. Sambandam	DMK	K. Chellaiah Kuzha (Note: Tamil Nadu Mutharaiyar Sangam contested on the "Rising Sun" symbol of the Dravida Munnetra Kazhagam (DMK), and is officially recorded as a DMK candidate in electoral records.)
181	Orathanadu	ADMK	R. Vaithilingam	DMK	P. Rajamanickam
182	Thiruvonam	ADMK	C. Rajendran	DMK	M. Ramachandran
183	Thanjavur	INC	R. Rajmohan	DMK	S. N. M. Ubayadullah
184	Tiruvaiyaru	ADMK	K. Ayyaru Vandayar	DMK	Durai Chandrasekaran
185	Papanasam	TMC	M. Ramkumar	DMK	S. Kalyanasundaram
186	Valangiman (SC)	ADMK	M. Boopathi Mariappan	PT	T. Nadaiyazhagan
187	Kumbakonam	ADMK	Rama Ramanathan	DMK	Ko. Si. Mani
188	Thiruvidaimarudur	ADMK	G. Thavamani	DMK	S. Ramalingam
189	Thirumayam	ADMK	M. Radhakrishnan	DMK	S. Regupathy
190	Kolathur (SC)	ADMK	Dr. A. Karuppayee	PT	M. Palaniappan
191	Pudukkottai	ADMK	Dr. C. Vijayabaskar	DMK	Periyannan Arasu
192	Alangudi	ADMK	A. Venkatachalam	DMK	S. A. Soosairaj
193	Arantangi	INC	A. Chandrasekaran	MADMK	P. Arasan
194	Tiruppattur	ADMK	K. K. Umadhevan	DMK	R. Sivaraman
195	Karaikudi	TMC	S. P. Udayappan	BJP	H. Raja
196	Tiruvadanai	TMC	K. R. Ramasamy	MADMK	S. Rajendran
197	Ilayangudi	ADMK	V. D. Nadarajan	MTD	Raja Kannappan
198	Sivaganga	ADMK	V. Chandran	DMK	Pasumpon Tha Kiruttinan
199	Manamadurai (SC)	TMC	K. Paramalai	BJP	S. P. Kirubanidhi
200	Paramakudi (SC)	TMC	R. Ramprabhu	PT	S. Chelliah
201	Ramanathapuram	ADMK	A. Anwar Rhazza	DMK	A. Rahman Khan
202	Kadaladi	TMC	S. Balakrishnan	DMK	Suba Thangavelan
203	Mudukulathur	ADMK	K. Patinetampatian	MTD	S. Pandian
204	Aruppukottai	ADMK	K. K. Sivasamy	DMK	Thangam Thennarasu
205	Sattur	INC	A. Rajendran	DMK	Sattur Ramachandran
206	Virudhunagar	TMC	S. Dhamodharan	DMK	A. R. R. Seenivasan
207	Sivakasi	TMC	A. Rajagopal	DMK	V. Thangaraj
208	Srivilliputhur	ADMK	R. T. Inbathamilan	BJP	S. Mohanrajulu
209	Rajapalayam (SC)	ADMK	M. Rajasekar	DMK	V. P. Rajan
210	Vilathikulam	ADMK	N. K. Perumal	DMK	R. K. P. Rajasekaran
211	Ottapidaram (SC)	ADMK	A. Sivaperumal	PT	K. Krishnasamy
212	Koilpatti	CPI	S. Rajendran	DMK	K. Rajaram
213	Sankaranayanarkoil (SC)	ADMK	C. Karuppasamy	PT	P. Duraisamy
214	Vasudevanallur (SC)	TMC	R. Eswaran	PT	S. Thangapandian
215	Kadayanallur	ADMK	M. Subbiah Pandian	DMK	P. Shahul
216	Tenkasi	ADMK	K. Annamalai	DMK	Karuppasamy Pandian
217	Alangulam	ADMK	P. G. Rajendran	DMK	Aladi Aruna
218	Tirunelveli	ADMK	Nainar Nagendran	DMK	A. L. Subramanian
219	Palayamcottai	ADMK	S. Muthu Karuppan	DMK	T. P. M. Mohideen Khan
220	Cheranmahadevi	ADMK	P. H. Manoj Pandian	BJP	N. Chockalingam
221	Ambasamudram	ADMK	M. Sakthivel Murugan	DMK	R. Avudaiappan
222	Nanguneri	ADMK	S. Manickaraj	MTD	V. Ramachandran
223	Radhapuram	PMK	S. Jothi	DMK	T. Venus Veera Arasu
224	Sattangulam	TMC	S. S. Mani Nadar	BJP	A. N. Rajakkannan
225	Tiruchendur	ADMK	Anitha R. Radhakrishnan	DMK	J. Jenifer Chandran
226	Srivaikuntam	ADMK	S. P. Shunmuganathan	DMK	S. David Selvyn
227	Tuticorin	ADMK	S. Rajammal	DMK	N. Periasamy
228	Kanniyakumari	ADMK	Thalavai N. Sundaram	DMK	N. Suresh Rajan
229	Nagercoil	TMC	M. Moses	MADMK	S. Austin
230	Colachel	ADMK	K. T. Pachaimal	DMK	Era Bernard
231	Padmanabhapuram	ADMK	K. P. Rajendra Prasad	BJP	C. Velayudham
232	Thiruvattar	CPI(M)	J. Hemachandran	BJP	P. Rajamony
233	Vilavancode	CPI(M)	D. Moni	DMK	P. Jeevaraj
234	Killiyoor	TMC	D. Kumaradas	BJP	C. Santhakumar

== Opinion polling ==
=== Pre-poll surveys ===
Seat and voteshare projections
Polling agency	Date published							Ref.
Polling agency	Date published	AIADMK+		DMK+		Others		Ref.
India Today-ORG-Marg	17-26 Apr 2001	120-130	48%	105-115	46%	2-5	6%	
"People studies" - Loyola College, Chennai	26 Apr 2001	110-120	–	90-100	–	–	–	
The Week	7 May 2001	195-210	53.5%	20-35	–	0	–	
Junior Vikatan	7 May 2001	107	–	125	–	2	–	
The Times of India	7 May 2001	154-170	–	64-80	–	–	–	
Outlook-CMS	7 May 2001	≤175	39%	≤68	–	≤6	–	

=== Exit polls ===
A post poll survey conducted by the CSDS in collaboration with NDTV and Frontline found that, at the end of its five-year (1996-2001) term, the DMK government did not face major public disapproval and its performance ratings compared favourably with Left front governments in West Bengal and Kerala. About 42% of respondents preferred the government led by Karunanidhi over the previous AIADMK regime, while Jayalalithaa trailed slightly behind Karunanidhi in chief ministerial preference. Although both leaders were widely perceived as corrupt, with 61% describing Jayalalithaa and 51% Karunanidhi as such, corruption did not become a decisive election issue due to the lack of a clear alternative. The survey also indicated that Jayalalithaa’s disqualification had limited electoral impact, with only 7% saying it influenced their vote, resulting in a net gain of about 1% for the AIADMK-led Alliance.

Agency	Dates	Results
CNN-IBN – The Hindu	11 May 2001 (Reported)	AIADMK+: 125 seats (48% of the vote); DMK+: 105 seats (47% of the vote); Others: 4 seats (5% of the vote)

== Results ==
=== Results by Pre-Poll Alliance ===
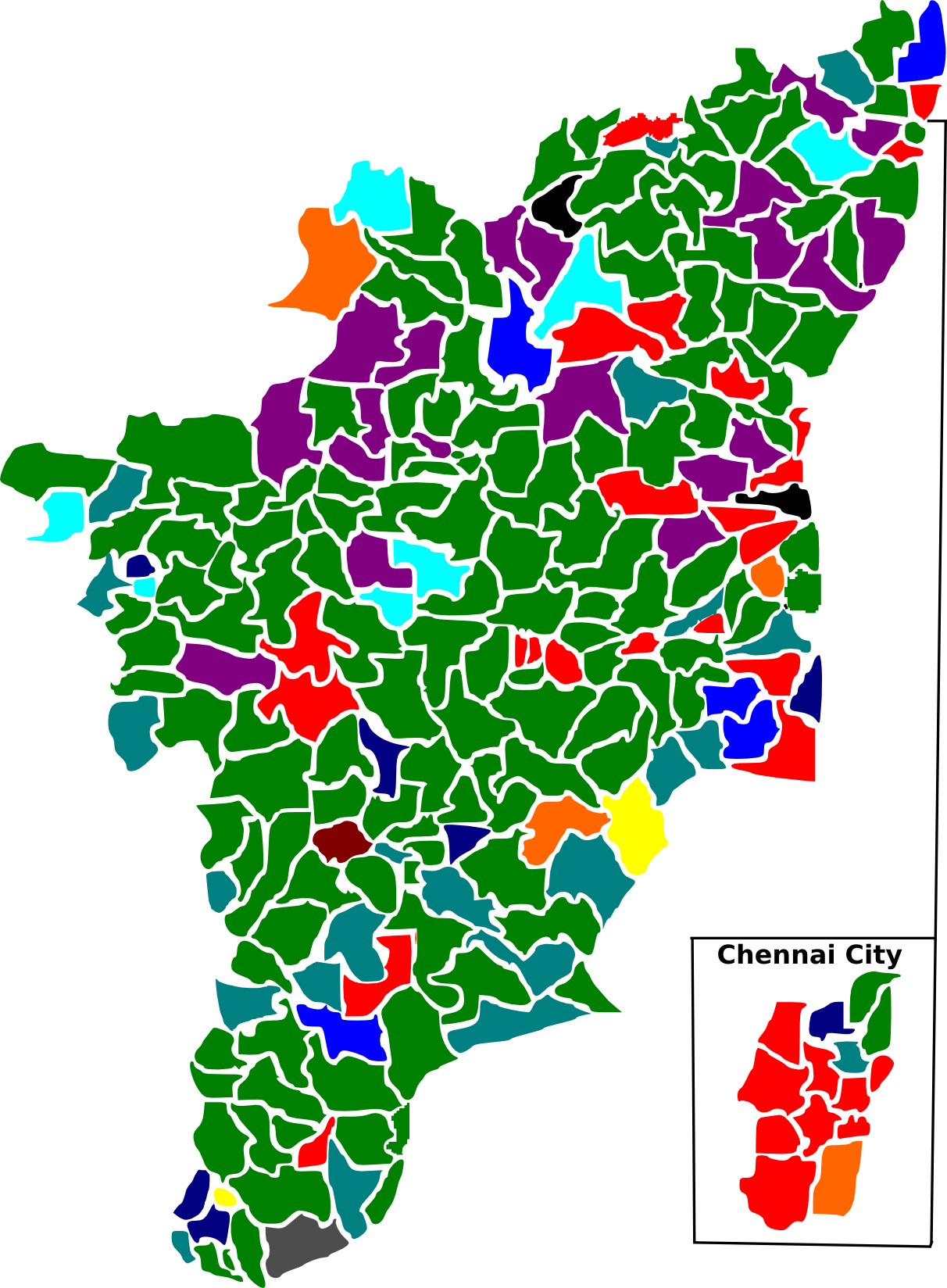
Election map of results based on parties. Colours are based on the results table on the left

Summary of the 2001 May Assembly election results in Tamil Nadu
Alliance/Party	Seats won	Change	Popular Vote	Vote %	Adj. %^{‡}
AIADMK+ alliance	196	+138	14,043,980	50.1%	
AIADMK	132	+127	8,815,387	31.4%	52.1%
TMC(M)	23	-15	1,885,726	6.7%	47.5%
PMK	20	+16	1,557,500	5.6%	46.8%
INC	7	+7	696,205	2.5%	45.4%
CPI(M)	6	+4	470,736	1.7%	48.2%
CPI	5	-3	444,710	1.6%	48.5%
IND	2	+2	103,971	0.4%	46.6%
AIFB	1	+1	39,248	0.1%	43.3%
MUL	0	-1	30,497	0.1%	41.7%
DMK+ alliance	37	-138	10,841,157	38.7%	
DMK	31	-142	8,669,864	30.9%	39.0%
BJP	4	+3	895,352	3.2%	38.7%
MADMK	2	+1	129,474	0.5%	37.1%
PT	0	–	355,171	1.3%	33.8%
MTD	0	–	257,126	0.9%	40.9%
PNK	0	–	196,740	0.7%	33.6%
MGRK	0	–	136,916	0.5%	40.8%
TB	0	–	45,002	0.2%	40.0%
CNMK	0	–	40,421	0.1%	32.4%
IND	0	–	115,091	0.4%	36.7%
Others	1	–	3,192,598	11.4%	
MDMK	0	–	1,304,469	4.7%	5.1%
IND	1	–	1,509,378	6.2%	6.3%
Total	234	–	28,037,314	100%	–

Note: Parties that contested under "rising-sun" or "two-leaves" symbol are listed as DMK or AIADMK respectively. Parties that ran their candidates as independents, (e.g. Indian Uzhavar Uzhaippalar Katchi and Thondar Congress in DMK alliance) are listed as IND for their respective alliance.
‡: Vote % reflects the percentage of votes the party received compared to the entire electorate that voted in this election. Adjusted (Adj.) Vote %, reflects the average % of votes the party received per constituency that they contested.
Sources: Election Commission of India and Rediff Newspaper

=== Result Analysis ===
Following the previous 1999 Lok Sabha elections, the DMK-led NDA alliance under M. Karunanidhi, which had secured 47% vote share and leads in 147 Assembly segments, weakened due to defections. The Pattali Makkal Katchi (PMK) shifted to the AIADMK alliance, while the Marumalarchi Dravida Munnetra Kazhagam (MDMK) led by Vaiko and the Tamizhaga Rajiv Congress (TRC) led by Vazhapadi K. Ramamurthy were excluded, resulting in an estimated 15% loss. Despite inducting Puthiya Tamilagam and the Dalit Panthers of India (DPI), the alliance still faced a net decline of about 11% points. In contrast, the AIADMK-led Secular Democratic Progressive Alliance under J. Jayalalithaa gained strength by inducting PMK and aligning with the Tamil Maanila Congress led by G. K. Moopanar, resulting in an estimated 15% gain and significantly improving its electoral position.

=== Results by district (Alliance Wise) ===
District	Seats			
District	Seats	ADK+	DMK+	OTH
Chennai	14	4	10	—N/a
Tiruvallur	8	7	1	—N/a
Kanchipuram	9	8	1	—N/a
Vellore	12	11	1	—N/a
Tiruvannamalai	9	7	2	—N/a
Villupuram	12	11	1	—N/a
Cuddalore	9	4	5	—N/a
Dharmapuri	10	9	1	—N/a
Salem	12	12	—N/a	—N/a
Namakkal	5	5	—N/a	—N/a
Coimbatore	17	16	1	—N/a
Erode	8	8	—N/a	—N/a
Nilgiris	3	3	—N/a	—N/a
Dindigul	7	6	1	—N/a
Karur	4	4	—N/a	—N/a
Tiruchirapalli	9	6	3	—N/a
Perambalur	5	5	—N/a	—N/a
Thanjavur	9	7	2	—N/a
Nagapattinam	6	4	2	—N/a
Tiruvarur	5	4	1	—N/a
Pudukottai	5	4	1	—N/a
Sivaganga	6	5	1	—N/a
Ramanathapuram	4	4	—N/a	—N/a
Virudhunagar	6	5	1	—N/a
Madurai	9	9	—N/a	—N/a
Theni	6	6	—N/a	—N/a
Thoothukudi	7	7	—N/a	—N/a
Tirunelveli	11	9	1	1
Kanyakumari	7	6	1	—N/a
Total	234	196	37	1

=== Results by District (Party Wise) ===
District	Seats							
District	Seats	ADK	DMK	TMC	PMK	INC	LFT	OTH
Chennai	14	2	9	1	—N/a	—N/a	1	1
Tiruvallur	8	3	1	1	2	—N/a	1	—N/a
Kanchipuram	9	5	1	—N/a	2	1	—N/a	—N/a
Vellore	12	6	1	1	2	1	—N/a	1
Tiruvannamalai	9	5	2	—N/a	2	—N/a	—N/a	—N/a
Villupuram	12	9	1	1	1	—N/a	—N/a	—N/a
Cuddalore	9	1	5	—N/a	2	—N/a	—N/a	1
Dharmapuri	10	5	—N/a	—N/a	2	1	1	1
Salem	12	9	—N/a	—N/a	3	—N/a	—N/a	—N/a
Namakkal	5	3	—N/a	—N/a	1	1	—N/a	—N/a
Coimbatore	17	10	1	3	1	1	1	—N/a
Erode	8	7	—N/a	—N/a	1	—N/a	—N/a	—N/a
Nilgiris	3	1	—N/a	1	—N/a	1	—N/a	—N/a
Dindigul	7	5	1	—N/a	—N/a	—N/a	1	—N/a
Karur	4	3	—N/a	—N/a	—N/a	1	—N/a	—N/a
Tiruchirapalli	9	6	3	—N/a	—N/a	—N/a	—N/a	—N/a
Perambalur	5	4	—N/a	—N/a	1	—N/a	—N/a	—N/a
Thanjavur	9	4	2	3	—N/a	—N/a	—N/a	—N/a
Nagapattinam	6	4	1	—N/a	—N/a	—N/a	—N/a	1
Tiruvarur	5	1	1	1	—N/a	—N/a	2	—N/a
Pudukottai	5	4	—N/a	—N/a	—N/a	—N/a	—N/a	1
Sivaganga	6	3	—N/a	2	—N/a	—N/a	—N/a	1
Ramanathapuram	4	2	—N/a	2	—N/a	—N/a	—N/a	—N/a
Virudhunagar	6	3	1	2	—N/a	—N/a	—N/a	—N/a
Madurai	9	6	—N/a	1	—N/a	—N/a	1	1
Theni	6	5	—N/a	1	—N/a	—N/a	—N/a	—N/a
Thoothukudi	7	5	—N/a	1	—N/a	—N/a	1	—N/a
Tirunelveli	11	8	1	1	—N/a	—N/a	—N/a	1
Kanyakumari	7	3	—N/a	1	—N/a	—N/a	2	1
Total	234	132	31	23	20	7	11 (Note: CPI & CPI(M) (11 seats): Communist Party of India (Marxist) (6) and Communist Party of India (5))	10 (Note: Others (10 seats): Bharatiya Janata Party (4), Independents (3), MGR Anna Dravida Munnetra Kazhagam (2), and All India Forward Bloc (1))

=== By Region ===
Alliance-wise Results
Region	Total Seats	AIADMK-led Alliance	DMK-led Alliance
Northern Tamil Nadu	73	52 / 73 (71%)	21 / 73 (29%)
Western Tamil Nadu	66	63 / 66 (95%)	3 / 66 (5%)
Southern TamilNadu	56	51 / 56 (91%)	4 / 56 (7%)
Central TamilNadu	39	30 / 39 (77%)	9 / 39 (23%)

=== Results by constituency ===
District	Constituency		Winner				Runner Up				Margin	%
District	#	Name	Candidate	Party	Votes	%	Candidate	Party	Votes	%	Margin	%
Chennai	1	Royapuram	D. Jayakumar	ADMK	44,465	56.76	K. Nargunan	DMK	30,753	39.26	13,712	17.50
Chennai	2	Harbour	K. Anbazhagan	DMK	24,225	46.98	D. Pandian	CPI	23,889	46.33	336	0.65
Chennai	3	Dr. R. K. Nagar	P. K. Sekar Babu	ADMK	74,888	58.43	S. P. Sarguna	DMK	47,556	37.10	27,332	21.33
Chennai	4	Park Town	S. G. Vinayakamurthi	TMC	33,031	51.40	T. Rajendar	DMK	26,654	41.47	6,377	9.93
Chennai	5	Perambur (SC)	K. Mahendran	CPM	69,613	52.42	Chengai Sivam	DMK	52,390	39.45	17,223	12.97
Chennai	6	Purasawalkam	B. Ranganathan	DMK	69,681	48.53	P. Vetriivel	TMC	65,879	45.89	3,802	2.64
Chennai	7	Egmore (SC)	P. Ilamvazhuthi	DMK	33,189	47.69	B. John Pandian	ADMK	33,103	47.57	86	0.12
Chennai	8	Anna Nagar	Arcot N. Veeraswami	DMK	77,353	48.20	C. Arumugam	PMK	71,775	44.73	5,578	3.47
Chennai	9	Theagaraya Nagar	J. Anbazhagan	DMK	57,875	48.55	E. V. K. Sulochana S.	ADMK	55,376	46.45	2,499	2.10
Chennai	10	Thousand Lights	M. K. Stalin	DMK	49,056	51.41	S. Sekar	TMC	41,782	43.78	7,274	7.63
Chennai	11	Chepauk	M. Karunanidhi	DMK	29,836	51.91	R. Damodharan	INC	25,002	43.50	4,834	8.41
Chennai	12	Triplicane	S. A. M. Hussain	DMK	34,943	49.79	S. Rajakumar	INC	31,267	44.55	3,676	5.24
Chennai	13	Mylapore	K. N. Lakshmanan	BJP	60,996	51.09	V. Maitreyan	ADMK	54,949	46.03	6,047	5.06
Chennai	14	Saidapet	V. Perumal	DMK	62,118	48.13	C. R. Baskaran	PMK	58,237	45.12	3,881	3.01
Tiruvallur	15	Gummidipundi	K. Sudarsanam	ADMK	73,467	56.07	K. Venu	DMK	48,509	37.02	24,958	19.05
Tiruvallur	16	Ponneri (SC)	A. S. Kannan	CPI	81,408	54.58	K. Sundaram	DMK	54,018	36.22	27,390	18.36
Tiruvallur	17	Thiruvottiyur	T. Arumugam	ADMK	1,13,808	54.94	Kumari Anandan	IND	79,767	38.50	34,041	16.44
Tiruvallur	18	Villivakkam	D. Nepoleon	DMK	1,64,787	48.21	A. Chellakumar	TMC	1,55,557	45.51	9,230	2.70
Kanchipuram	19	Alandur	B. Valarmathi	ADMK	94,554	47.59	Eraama Veerappan	MGRK	81,958	41.25	12,596	6.34
Kanchipuram	20	Tambaram	M.A. Vaidialingam	DMK	1,50,961	46.86	K. Chakkaraipani R.	TMC	1,45,530	45.18	5,431	1.68
Kanchipuram	21	Tirupporur (SC)	S. Kanitha Sampath	ADMK	74,716	54.64	C. Nagarajan	DMK	49,926	36.51	24,790	18.13
Kanchipuram	22	Chengalpattu	K. Arumugam	PMK	52,465	43.50	V. Viswanathan	DMK	47,316	39.23	5,149	4.27
Kanchipuram	23	Maduranthakam	P. Vasudevan	ADMK	57,610	51.10	S.D. Ugamchand	DMK	45,916	40.73	11,694	10.37
Kanchipuram	24	Acharapakkam (SC)	A. Selvaraj	PMK	54,114	53.69	Dr. T. Murugesan	DMK	38,636	38.33	15,478	15.36
Kanchipuram	25	Uthiramerur	V. Somasundaram	ADMK	73,824	56.48	K. Sundar	DMK	46,202	35.35	27,622	21.13
Kanchipuram	26	Kancheepuram	S.S. Thirunavukkarasu	ADMK	84,246	55.81	A. Sekar	DMK	60,643	40.17	23,603	15.64
Kanchipuram	27	Sriperumbudur (SC)	D. Yasodha	INC	70,663	49.93	M. Raghavan	DMK	53,470	37.78	17,193	12.15
Tiruvallur	28	Poonamallee	S. Shanmugam	PMK	62,220	37.51	S. Chezhiyan	DMK	59,904	36.12	2,316	1.39
Tiruvallur	29	Tiruvallur	D. Sudharsanam	TMC	47,899	42.90	V.G. Rajendiran	PNK	27,948	25.03	19,951	17.87
Tiruvallur	30	Tiruttani	G. Raviraj	PMK	58,549	50.01	E.A.P. Shivaji	DMK	44,675	38.16	13,874	11.85
Tiruvallur	31	Pallipet	P.M. Narasimhan	ADMK	62,289	49.42	M. Chakravarthy	BJP	34,049	27.02	28,240	22.40
Vellore	32	Arkonam (SC)	K. Bhavani Karunakaran	ADMK	67,034	55.09	R. Ravishankar	DMK	46,778	38.44	20,256	16.65
Vellore	33	Sholinghur	R. Vilvanathan	ADMK	62,576	50.12	A.M. Ponnurangam	PNK	52,781	42.28	9,795	7.84
Vellore	34	Ranipet	M.S. Chandrasekaran	ADMK	83,250	56.37	R. Gandhi	DMK	58,287	39.47	24,963	16.90
Vellore	35	Arcot	P. Neelakandan	ADMK	61,474	55.39	A.K. Sundaramoorthy	DMK	43,767	39.44	17,707	15.95
Vellore	36	Katpadi	Duraimurugan	DMK	64,187	49.47	A.K. Natarajan	PMK	56,185	43.30	8,002	6.17
Vellore	37	Gudiyatham	C.M. Suryakala	ADMK	61,128	57.05	S. Duraisamy	DMK	36,804	34.35	24,324	22.70
Tiruvannamalai	38	Pernambut (SC)	C. Kanagathara (Selvi)	ADMK	65,366	59.07	S. Thondral Nayagan	BJP	36,511	32.99	28,855	26.08
Vellore	39	Vaniayambadi	M. Abdul Latheef	IND	54,218	48.26	J.M. Haroon Rasheed	DMK	42,280	37.63	11,938	10.63
Vellore	40	Natrampalli	S. Natarajan	PMK	67,046	48.96	T. Anbazhagan	MGRK	54,958	40.13	12,088	8.83
Vellore	41	Tiruppattur	T.K. Raja	PMK	59,840	46.15	S. Arasu	DMK	54,079	41.70	5,761	4.45
Vellore	42	Chengam (SC)	Polur Varadhan	INC	54,145	48.43	R. Shamala	MTD	41,868	37.45	12,277	10.98
Tiruvannamalai	43	Thandarambattu	Velu	DMK	63,599	48.86	K. Manivarma	TMC	58,762	45.14	4,837	3.72
Tiruvannamalai	44	Tiruvannamalai	K. Pitchandi	DMK	64,115	47.75	M. Shunmugasundaram	PMK	60,025	44.70	4,090	3.05
Tiruvannamalai	45	Kalasapakkam	S. Ramachandran	ADMK	75,880	58.05	P.S. Thiruvengadam	DMK	46,990	35.95	28,890	22.10
Tiruvannamalai	46	Polur	Nalini Manokaran	ADMK	59,678	51.31	C. Elumalai	DMK	48,871	42.02	10,807	9.29
Vellore	47	Anaicut	K. Pandurangan	ADMK	61,333	56.24	G. Malarvizhi	DMK	40,282	36.93	21,051	19.31
Vellore	48	Vellore	C. Gnanasekaran	TMC	60,697	52.46	A.M. Ramalingam	DMK	49,573	42.84	11,124	9.62
Tiruvannamalai	49	Arni	K. Ramachandran	ADMK	66,371	50.98	A.C. Shanmugam	PNK	52,889	40.62	13,482	10.36
Tiruvannamalai	50	Cheyyar	P.S. Ulagarakshagan	PMK	62,615	50.90	R.K.P. Rajarajan	DMK	50,530	41.07	12,085	9.83
Tiruvannamalai	51	Vandavasi (SC)	K. Murugavelrajan	PMK	55,773	49.14	K. Loganathan	DMK	46,902	41.33	8,871	7.81
Tiruvannamalai	52	Peranamallur	A.K.S. Anbalagan	ADMK	52,625	45.62	B. Bose	MTD	44,266	38.37	8,359	7.25
Villupuram	53	Melmalayanur	R. Tamilmozhi	ADMK	55,309	51.02	Dr. A. Gnanasekaran	DMK	30,722	28.34	24,587	22.68
Villupuram	54	Gingee	V. Elumalai	ADMK	58,564	51.33	Rajendiran	DMK	29,478	25.84	29,086	25.49
Villupuram	55	Tindivanam	C.Ve. Shanmugm	ADMK	54,884	53.31	R. Sethunathan	DMK	42,736	41.51	12,148	11.80
Villupuram	56	Vanur (SC)	N. Ganapathy	ADMK	68,421	55.65	R. Mydili	DMK	47,072	38.28	21,349	17.37
Villupuram	57	Kandamangalam (SC)	V. Subramanian	ADMK	67,574	56.29	E. Vijayaragavan	DMK	44,946	37.44	22,628	18.85
Villupuram	58	Villupuram	K. Ponmudy	DMK	65,693	47.45	R. Pasupathy	PMK	63,488	45.86	2,205	1.59
Villupuram	59	Mugaiyur	G. Gothandaraman	ADMK	57,484	51.30	A. Gee. Sampath	DMK	47,143	42.07	10,341	9.23
Villupuram	60	Thirunavalur	K.G.P. Gnanamoorthy	ADMK	59,115	52.51	A.J. Manikkannan	DMK	44,342	39.39	14,773	13.12
Villupuram	61	Ulundurpet (SC)	N. Ramu	ADMK	73,384	55.09	K. Thirunavukkarasu	DMK	50,630	38.01	22,754	17.08
Cuddalore	62	Nellikuppam	M.C. Sampath	ADMK	56,349	50.93	V.C. Shanmugham	DMK	48,967	44.26	7,382	6.67
Cuddalore	63	Cuddalore	E. Pugazhendi	DMK	54,671	45.61	P.R.S. Venkatesan	TMC	54,637	45.58	34	0.03
Cuddalore	64	Panruti	T. Velmurugan	PMK	45,963	37.67	V. Ramaswamy	DMK	40,915	33.54	5,048	4.13
Cuddalore	65	Kurinjipadi	M.R.K. Panneer Selvam	DMK	65,425	55.78	K. Sivasubramanian	ADMK	41,562	35.44	23,863	20.34
Cuddalore	66	Bhuvanagiri	P.S. Arul	IND	49,753	44.85	M. Gopalakrishanan	MTD	45,989	41.46	3,764	3.39
Cuddalore	67	Kattumannarkoil (SC)	P. Vallalperuman	DMK	55,444	55.37	R. Sachithanandam	INC	38,927	38.87	16,517	16.50
Cuddalore	68	Chidambaram	K. Saravanan Durai	DMK	54,647	52.70	T. Arivuselvan	PMK	42,732	41.21	11,915	11.49
Cuddalore	69	Vridhachalam	R. Govindasamy	PMK	68,905	50.13	M. K. Tamizharasan	DMK	61,777	44.95	7,128	5.18
Cuddalore	70	Mangalore (SC)	Thol. Thirumavalavan	DMK	64,627	47.87	S. Puratchimani	TMC	62,772	46.49	1,855	1.38
Villupuram	71	Rishivandiam	S. Sivaraj	TMC	57,108	52.37	T.K.T. Murali	PNK	31,576	28.96	25,532	23.41
Villupuram	72	Chinnasalem	P. Mohan	ADMK	60,554	51.35	R. Mookkappan	DMK	51,442	43.63	9,112	7.72
Villupuram	73	Sankarapuram	P. Kasampu	PMK	56,971	45.12	T. Udhayasuriyan	DMK	55,953	44.31	1,018	0.81
Dharmapuri	74	Hosur	K. Gopinath	INC	45,865	35.24	B. Venkatasamy	BJP	39,376	30.25	6,489	4.99
Dharmapuri	75	Thalli	K.V. Murali Dharan	BJP	36,738	38.33	S. Raja Reddy	CPI	30,521	31.84	6,217	6.49
Dharmapuri	76	Kaveripattinam	K.P. Munusamy	ADMK	67,241	54.75	V.C. Govindasami	DMK	48,724	39.67	18,517	15.08
Dharmapuri	77	Krishnagiri	V. Govindarasu	ADMK	65,197	56.59	T. Senguttuvan	DMK	43,424	37.69	21,773	18.90
Dharmapuri	78	Bargur	M. Thambidurai	ADMK	82,039	66.31	E.G. Sugavanam	DMK	32,733	26.46	49,306	39.85
Dharmapuri	79	Harur (SC)	V. Krishnamoorthy	CPI	70,433	53.04	D. Periyasamy	DMK	36,954	27.83	33,479	25.21
Dharmapuri	80	Morappur	P. Palaniappan	ADMK	62,266	56.31	E.V. Rajasekaran	DMK	38,950	35.22	23,316	21.09
Dharmapuri	81	Palacode	K.P. Anbalagan	ADMK	75,284	62.38	G.L. Venkatachalam	DMK	35,052	29.04	40,232	33.34
Dharmapuri	82	Dharmapuri	K. Pary Mohan	PMK	56,147	46.65	K. Manoharan	DMK	45,173	37.54	10,974	9.11
Dharmapuri	83	Pennagaram	G.K. Mani	PMK	49,125	44.08	K.N. Periannan	IND	34,729	31.16	14,396	12.92
Salem	84	Mettur	S. Sundarambal	ADMK	49,504	42.25	P. Gopal	DMK	41,369	35.31	8,135	6.94
Salem	85	Taramangalam	M.P. Kamaraj	PMK	67,012	56.09	S. Ammasi	DMK	41,554	34.78	25,458	21.31
Salem	86	Omalur	S. Semmalai	ADMK	65,861	59.39	Era. Rajendran	DMK	34,259	30.89	31,602	28.50
Salem	87	Yercaud (ST)	K.T. Elayakannu	ADMK	64,319	64.35	K. Govindan	BJP	30,334	30.35	33,985	34.00
Salem	88	Salem-I	Se. Venkatajalam	ADMK	66,365	60.01	M.A. Elangovan	DMK	41,234	37.29	25,131	22.72
Salem	89	Salem-II	M. Karthe	PMK	62,306	54.25	A.L. Thangavel	DMK	47,221	41.11	15,085	13.14
Salem	90	Veerapandi	S.K. Selvam	ADMK	85,657	58.38	S. Arumugam	DMK	55,645	37.92	30,012	20.46
Salem	91	Panamarathupatty	P. Vijayalakahmi Pa.	ADMK	78,642	64.51	S.R. Sivalingam	DMK	36,292	29.77	42,350	34.74
Salem	92	Attur	A.K. Murugesan	ADMK	64,936	57.85	Mu.Ra. Karunanidhi	DMK	40,191	35.81	24,745	22.04
Salem	93	Talavasal (SC)	V. Alagammal	ADMK	67,682	58.24	M. Pandiyarajan	DMK	39,825	34.27	27,857	23.97
Namakkal	94	Rasipuram	P.R. Sundaram	ADMK	67,332	57.48	Dr. K.P. Ramalingam	DMK	44,303	37.82	23,029	19.66
Namakkal	95	Sendamangalam (ST)	K. Kalavathi	ADMK	61,312	55.64	Chinumathi Ch.	DMK	43,497	39.48	17,815	16.16
Namakkal	96	Namakkal (SC)	K. Jayakumar	INC	67,215	58.14	S. Ahilan	PT	38,223	33.06	28,992	25.08
Namakkal	97	Kapilamalai	A.R. Malaiyappasamy	PMK	48,447	41.75	S. Gandhiselvan	DMK	44,135	38.03	4,312	3.72
Namakkal	98	Tiruchengode	C. Ponnaiyan	ADMK	1,07,898	59.55	T.P. Arumugam	DMK	63,789	35.20	44,109	24.35
Salem	99	Sankari (SC)	P. Dhanabal	ADMK	70,312	56.41	T.R. Saravanan	DMK	47,360	38.00	22,952	18.41
Salem	100	Edapadi	I. Ganesan	PMK	74,375	55.40	A. Kandasamy	DMK	43,564	32.45	30,811	22.95
Coimbatore	101	Mettupalayam	A.K. Selvaraj	ADMK	85,578	60.02	B. Arun Kumar	DMK	44,500	31.21	41,078	28.81
Coimbatore	102	Avanashi (SC)	S. Mahalingam	ADMK	59,571	48.20	M. Mohankumar	IND	38,559	31.20	21,012	17.00
Coimbatore	103	Thondamuthur	S. R. Balasubramaniam	TMC	96,959	50.57	V.R. Sukanya	DMK	68,423	35.68	28,536	14.89
Coimbatore	104	Singanallur	K.C. Karunakaran	CPM	82,773	49.57	N. Palanisamy	DMK	62,772	37.59	20,001	11.98
Coimbatore	105	Coimbatore West	S. Maheswari	INC	40,372	51.44	C.T. Dhandapani	DMK	30,281	38.58	10,091	12.86
Coimbatore	106	Coimbatore East	V.K. Lakshmanan	TMC	41,419	50.08	N.R. Nanjappan	BJP	38,208	46.19	3,211	3.89
Coimbatore	107	Perur	M.A.P.A. Krishnakumar	ADMK	94,607	55.50	N. Nageswari	DMK	59,343	34.81	35,264	20.69
Coimbatore	108	Kinathukkadavu	S. Damodaran	ADMK	55,958	50.33	M. Shanmugam	DMK	22,178	19.95	33,780	30.38
Coimbatore	109	Pollachi	V. Jayaraman	ADMK	64,648	52.48	R. Tamil Mani	DMK	32,244	26.18	32,404	26.30
Coimbatore	110	Valparai (SC)	M. Kovai Thangam	TMC	47,428	53.21	Dr. K. Krishnaswamy	PT	29,513	33.11	17,915	20.10
Coimbatore	111	Udumalpet	C. Shanmugavelu	ADMK	78,938	56.92	D. Selvaraj	DMK	39,030	28.14	39,908	28.78
Coimbatore	112	Dharapuram (SC)	V. Sivakami	PMK	56,835	50.49	R. Sareswathi	DMK	34,683	30.81	22,152	19.68
Coimbatore	113	Vellakoil	M.P. Saminathan	DMK	37,571	32.99	V.P. Periasamy	ADMK	36,831	32.34	740	0.65
Coimbatore	114	Pongalur	P.V. Damodaran	ADMK	57,139	53.56	K. Chellamuthu	IND	35,324	33.11	21,815	20.45
Coimbatore	115	Palladam	S.M. Velusamy	ADMK	82,592	55.86	S.S. Ponmudi	DMK	50,118	33.89	32,474	21.97
Coimbatore	116	Tiruppur	C. Sivasami	ADMK	1,27,224	59.91	Lalitha K.	BJP	80,668	37.98	46,556	21.93
Coimbatore	117	Kangayam	M. Selvi	ADMK	58,700	51.06	N. S. Rajkumar M.	DMK	47,426	41.25	11,274	9.81
Erode	118	Modakurichi	P. C. Ramasami	ADMK	74,296	55.24	S. Jagadeesan	DMK	40,084	29.81	34,212	25.43
Erode	119	Perundurai	K.S. Palanisamy	ADMK	72,133	57.88	N. Govindaswamy	CNMK	40,421	32.43	31,712	25.45
Erode	120	Erode	K.S. Thennarasu	ADMK	95,450	52.40	N.K.K. Periyasamy	DMK	71,010	38.98	24,440	13.42
Erode	121	Bhavani	K.C. Karuppannan	ADMK	64,405	58.20	J. Sudhanandhen	PNK	31,546	28.50	32,859	29.70
Erode	122	Andhiyur (SC)	R. Krishnan	PMK	53,436	54.38	P. Selvarasu	DMK	35,374	36.00	18,062	18.38
Erode	123	Gobichettipalayam	S.S. Ramaneedharan	ADMK	60,826	57.05	V.P. Shanmugasundram	DMK	31,881	29.90	28,945	27.15
Erode	124	Bhavanisagar	P. Chithambaram	ADMK	53,879	47.67	O. Subramaniam	DMK	43,604	38.58	10,275	9.09
Erode	125	Sathyamangalam	K.R. Kandasamy	ADMK	54,252	52.21	S.K. Rajendran	DMK	20,818	20.04	33,434	32.17
Nilgiris	126	Coonoor (SC)	K. Kandasamy	TMC	53,156	55.86	E.M. Mahaliappan	DMK	36,512	38.37	16,644	17.49
Nilgiris	127	Ootacamund	H.M. Raju	INC	59,872	62.67	J. Hutchi Gowder	BJP	30,782	32.22	29,090	30.45
Nilgiris	128	Gudalur	A. Miller	ADMK	78,809	57.43	M. Pandiaraj	DMK	46,116	33.61	32,693	23.82
Dindigul	129	Palani (SC)	M. Chinnasamy	ADMK	63,611	55.65	T. Poovendhan	DMK	43,124	37.73	20,487	17.92
Dindigul	130	Oddanchatram	Ara. Chakkarapani	DMK	52,896	46.40	A.T. Sellasamy	ADMK	51,527	45.20	1,369	1.20
Theni	131	Periyakulam	O. Panneer Selvam	ADMK	62,125	54.28	M. Abuthahir	DMK	44,205	38.62	17,920	15.66
Theni	132	Theni	D. Ganesan	ADMK	60,115	48.88	L. Mookaiah	DMK	46,254	37.61	13,861	11.27
Theni	133	Bodinayakkanur	S. Ramaraj	ADMK	53,410	49.94	A. Sudalaimuthu	DMK	42,132	39.39	11,278	10.55
Theni	134	Cumbum	O.R. Ramachandran	TMC	56,823	50.73	N.K.R. Krishnakumar	BJP	52,437	46.82	4,386	3.91
Theni	135	Andipatti	Thanga Tamil Selvan	ADMK	60,817	53.78	P. Aasiyan	DMK	35,808	31.67	25,009	22.11
Theni	136	Sedapatti	C. Durairaj	ADMK	45,393	47.51	P.V. Bakthavatchalam	PT	26,958	28.21	18,435	19.30
Madurai	137	Thirumangalam	K. Kalimuthu	ADMK	58,080	52.67	T. Ocha Thevar	DMK	39,918	36.20	18,162	16.47
Madurai	138	Usilampatti	L. Santhanam	FBL	39,248	43.32	S.O. Ramasamy	DMK	30,181	33.31	9,067	10.01
Dindigul	139	Nilakottai (SC)	G. Anbazhagan	ADMK	60,972	57.36	K. Ayyar	PT	29,478	27.73	31,494	29.63
Madurai	140	Sholavandan	V.R. Rajangam	ADMK	54,392	51.59	P. Moorthy	DMK	34,551	32.77	19,841	18.82
Madurai	141	Tirupparankundram	S.M. Seenivel	ADMK	83,167	48.93	C. Ramachandran	DMK	74,040	43.56	9,127	5.37
Madurai	142	Madurai West	Valarmathijebaraj	ADMK	48,465	48.06	P.T.R. Palanivel Rajan	DMK	47,757	47.36	708	0.70
Madurai	143	Madurai Central	M.A. Hakeem	TMC	34,393	46.53	S. Paulraj	DMK	34,246	46.33	147	0.20
Madurai	144	Madurai East	N. Nanmaran	CPM	32,461	43.29	V. Velusamy	DMK	27,157	36.22	5,304	7.07
Madurai	145	Samayanallur (SC)	P. Ponnampalam	ADMK	97,060	52.67	S. Kasthuri Sivasamy	DMK	77,136	41.86	19,924	10.81
Madurai	146	Melur	R. Samy	ADMK	58,010	46.32	S. Samayanallur Se.	DMK	31,172	24.89	26,838	21.43
Dindigul	147	Natham	R. Viswanathan	ADMK	55,604	49.41	Ku.Pa. Krishnan	TB	45,002	39.99	10,602	9.42
Dindigul	148	Dindigul	K. Nagalakshimi	CPM	71,003	47.37	M. Basheer Ahmed	DMK	68,224	45.52	2,779	1.85
Dindigul	149	Athoor	P.K.T. Natarajaan	ADMK	64,053	49.13	I. Periasamy	DMK	60,447	46.36	3,606	2.77
Dindigul	150	Vedasandur	P. Andivel	ADMK	65,415	49.01	R. Kavitha Parthipan	DMK	46,289	34.68	19,126	14.33
Karur	151	Aravakurichi	E.A. Liyaudeen Sait	ADMK	51,535	48.03	Lakshmi Duraisamy	DMK	33,209	30.95	18,326	17.08
Karur	152	Karur	T.N. Sivasubramanian	INC	82,012	53.36	Vasuki Murugesan	DMK	58,574	38.11	23,438	15.25
Karur	153	Krishnarayapuram (SC)	R. Sasikala	ADMK	64,046	55.09	S. Periyasamy	DMK	42,497	36.56	21,549	18.53
Tiruchirapalli	154	Marungapuri	V.A. Chelliah	ADMK	65,619	53.92	B.M. Senguttuvan	DMK	40,347	33.16	25,272	20.76
Karur	155	Kulithalai	A. Pappasundaram	ADMK	66,406	52.78	D. Thirunavukkarasu	DMK	49,640	39.46	16,766	13.32
Tiruchirapalli	156	Thottiam	P. Annavi	ADMK	57,449	49.38	K. Kannaiyan	DMK	44,301	38.08	13,148	11.30
Tiruchirapalli	157	Uppiliapuram (ST)	R. Sarojaa	ADMK	58,810	50.47	R. Rani	DMK	46,459	39.87	12,351	10.60
Tiruchirapalli	158	Musiri	C. Malliga	ADMK	47,946	34.83	S. Vivekanandan	DMK	45,952	33.38	1,994	1.45
Tiruchirapalli	159	Lalgudi	S.M. Balan	ADMK	58,288	47.11	K.N. Nehru	DMK	56,678	45.81	1,610	1.30
Perambalur	160	Perambalur (SC)	P. Rajarethinam	ADMK	67,074	53.45	S. Vallaban	DMK	47,070	37.51	20,004	15.94
Perambalur	161	Varahur (SC)	A. Arunachalam	ADMK	61,064	52.76	K. Thiruvalluvan	DMK	47,160	40.75	13,904	12.01
Perambalur	162	Ariyalur	P. Elavazhagan	ADMK	52,676	41.03	T.A. Kathiravan	DMK	42,297	32.95	10,379	8.08
Perambalur	163	Andimadam	Kaduvetti Guru	PMK	66,576	59.41	M. Gnanamoorthy	DMK	39,574	35.31	27,002	24.10
Perambalur	164	Jayankondam	S. Annadurai	ADMK	70,948	56.60	K.C. Ganesan	DMK	45,938	36.65	25,010	19.95
Tiruchirapalli	165	Srirangam	K.K. Balasubramanian	ADMK	72,993	53.07	M. Soundarapandian	BJP	60,317	43.86	12,676	9.21
Tiruchirapalli	166	Tiruchirapalli-I	B. Paranikumor	DMK	31,421	42.93	M. Kadher Mohideen	IUML	30,497	41.67	924	1.26
Tiruchirapalli	167	Tiruchirapalli-II	Anbil Periasamy	DMK	56,598	52.06	P.C. Selvaraj	INC	42,654	39.23	13,944	12.83
Tiruchirapalli	168	Thiruverambur	K.N. Sekaran	DMK	61,254	47.30	T.K. Rangarajan	CPM	50,881	39.29	10,373	8.01
Nagapattinam	169	Sirkali (SC)	N. Chandramohan	ADMK	52,759	49.31	J. Irai Ezhil	DMK	48,329	45.17	4,430	4.14
Nagapattinam	170	Poompuhar	N. Renganathan	ADMK	53,760	50.55	M. Mohammed Siddiq	DMK	46,305	43.54	7,455	7.01
Nagapattinam	171	Mayuram	Jaga Veerapandian	BJP	51,303	49.51	R. Selvaraj	ADMK	48,851	47.14	2,452	2.37
Nagapattinam	172	Kuttalam	Natarajan	ADMK	55,921	48.64	P. Kalyanam	DMK	53,277	46.34	2,644	2.30
Tiruvarur	173	Nannilam (SC)	C.K. Tamizharasan	TMC	52,450	46.11	P. Sakthivel	DMK	33,238	29.22	19,212	16.89
Tiruvarur	174	Tiruvarur (SC)	A. Asokan	DMK	58,425	47.63	K. Rengasamy	CPM	57,111	46.56	1,314	1.07
Nagapattinam	175	Nagapattinam	R. Jeevanantham	ADMK	59,808	53.55	S.P. Thangaiya	DMK	43,091	38.59	16,717	14.96
Nagapattinam	176	Vedaranyam	S.K. Vedarathinam	DMK	63,568	53.71	R. Mutharasan	CPI	48,568	41.04	15,000	12.67
Tiruvarur	177	Tiruthuraipundi (SC)	G. Palanisamy	CPI	73,451	56.76	M. Poonguzhali	DMK	48,392	37.39	25,059	19.37
Tiruvarur	178	Mannargudi	V. Sivapunniyam	CPI	70,644	56.40	S. Gnanasekaran	BJP	50,454	40.28	20,190	16.12
Thanjavur	179	Pattukkottai	N.R. Rengarajan	TMC	55,474	47.49	P. Balasubramanian	DMK	48,524	41.54	6,950	5.95
Thanjavur	180	Peravurani	S. V. T. Sambandam	TMC	64,076	54.70	Kuzha Chellaiah	DMK	35,417	30.24	28,659	24.46
Thanjavur	181	Orathanad	R. Vaithilingam	ADMK	63,836	53.34	P. Rajamanickam	DMK	43,992	36.76	19,844	16.58
Thanjavur	182	Thiruvonam	C. Rajendran	ADMK	67,094	52.21	M. Ramachandran	DMK	55,871	43.48	11,223	8.73
Thanjavur	183	Thanjavur	S.N.M. Ubayadullah	DMK	55,782	50.96	R. Rajmohan	INC	46,192	42.20	9,590	8.76
Thanjavur	184	Tiruvaiyaru	K. Ayyaru Vandayar	ADMK	55,579	54.75	Durai Chandrasekaran	DMK	39,890	39.29	15,689	15.46
Thanjavur	185	Papanasam	M. Ramkumar	TMC	55,830	50.37	S. Kalyanasundaram	DMK	49,198	44.38	6,632	5.99
Tiruvarur	186	Valangiman (SC)	Boopathi Mariappan	ADMK	54,677	57.93	T. Nadaiyazhagan	PT	31,200	33.06	23,477	24.87
Thanjavur	187	Kumbakonam	Ko.Si. Mani	DMK	60,515	51.18	Rama Eramanathan	ADMK	54,019	45.69	6,496	5.49
Thanjavur	188	Thiruvidamarudur	G. Thavamani	ADMK	61,235	50.22	S. Ramalingam	DMK	53,863	44.17	7,372	6.05
Pudukottai	189	Thirumayam	M. Radakrishnan	ADMK	58,394	51.56	S. Regupathy	DMK	46,367	40.94	12,027	10.62
Pudukottai	190	Kolathur (SC)	Dr. A. Karuppayee	ADMK	80,855	61.98	M. Palaniappan	PT	33,956	26.03	46,899	35.95
Pudukottai	191	Pudukkottai	Dr. C. Vijayabasker	ADMK	77,627	53.96	Periyannan Arasu	DMK	49,444	34.37	28,183	19.59
Pudukottai	192	Alangudi	A. Venkadachalam	ADMK	59,631	42.67	S.A. Soosairaj	DMK	42,900	30.70	16,731	11.97
Pudukottai	193	Arantangi	P. Arasan	MADMK	58,499	45.99	A. Chandrasekaran	INC	38,481	30.25	20,018	15.74
Sivaganga	194	Tiruppattur	K.K. Umadhevan	ADMK	50,165	50.87	R. Sivaraman	DMK	41,075	41.65	9,090	9.22
Sivaganga	195	Karaikudi	H. Raja	BJP	54,093	48.40	S.P. Udayappan	TMC	52,442	46.93	1,651	1.47
Sivaganga	196	Tiruvadanai	K.R. Ramasamy	TMC	43,536	39.12	Jones Russo	IND	41,232	37.05	2,304	2.07
Sivaganga	197	Ilayangudi	V.D. Nadarajan	ADMK	45,342	47.86	S. Kannappan	MTD	40,660	42.92	4,682	4.94
Sivaganga	198	Sivaganga	V. Chandran	ADMK	51,708	48.68	Tha. Kiruttinan	DMK	47,435	44.65	4,273	4.03
Sivaganga	199	Manamadurai (SC)	K. Paramalai	TMC	56,508	57.06	S.P. Kirubanidhi	BJP	35,651	36.00	20,857	21.06
Ramanathapuram	200	Paramakudi (SC)	R. Ramprabhu	TMC	53,746	49.58	S. Chelliah	PT	47,939	44.22	5,807	5.36
Ramanathapuram	201	Ramanathapuram	A. Anwer Rhazza	ADMK	59,824	50.21	A. Rahman Khan	DMK	50,712	42.56	9,112	7.65
Ramanathapuram	202	Kadaladi	S. Balakrishnan	TMC	51,142	48.10	S.P. Thangavelan	DMK	45,027	42.35	6,115	5.75
Ramanathapuram	203	Mudukulathur	K. Patinetampatian	ADMK	49,554	46.99	S.M. Pandian	MTD	46,885	44.46	2,669	2.53
Virudunagar	204	Aruppukottai	K.K. Sivasamy	ADMK	49,307	46.07	Thangam Thennarasu	DMK	43,155	40.32	6,152	5.75
Virudunagar	205	Sattur	Sattur Ramachandran	DMK	57,953	42.91	A. Rajendran	INC	53,538	39.64	4,415	3.27
Virudunagar	206	Virudhunagar	S. Damodaran	TMC	49,413	42.67	A.R.R. Seenivasan	DMK	45,396	39.20	4,017	3.47
Virudunagar	207	Sivakasi	A. Rajagopal	TMC	65,954	42.45	V. Thangaraj	DMK	60,233	38.77	5,721	3.68
Virudunagar	208	Srivilliputhur	R.T. Enbathamilan	ADMK	53,095	43.88	S. Mohanrajulu	BJP	43,921	36.30	9,174	7.58
Virudunagar	209	Rajapalayam (SC)	M. Rajasekar	ADMK	61,740	47.63	V.P. Rajan	DMK	52,145	40.23	9,595	7.40
Thoothukudi	210	Vilathikulam	N.K. Perumal	ADMK	44,415	48.16	R.K.P. Rajasekaran	DMK	29,172	31.63	15,243	16.53
Thoothukudi	211	Ottapidaram (SC)	A. Sivaperumal	ADMK	39,350	43.30	Dr. K. Krishnasamy	PT	38,699	42.59	651	0.71
Thoothukudi	212	Koilpatti	S. Rajendran	CPI	45,796	40.27	K. Rajaram	DMK	36,757	32.32	9,039	7.95
Tirunelveli	213	Sankaranayanarkoil (SC)	C. Karuppasamy	ADMK	52,000	43.51	P. Duraisamy	PT	42,738	35.76	9,262	7.75
Tirunelveli	214	Vasudevanallur (SC)	R. Easwaran	TMC	48,019	47.05	S. Thangapandian	PT	36,467	35.73	11,552	11.32
Tirunelveli	215	Kadayanallur	M. Subbiah Pandian	ADMK	48,220	45.57	P.M. Shahul	DMK	46,976	44.39	1,244	1.18
Tirunelveli	216	Tenkasi	K. Annamalai	ADMK	62,454	51.41	Karuppasamy Pa.	DMK	53,662	44.18	8,792	7.23
Tirunelveli	217	Alangulam	P.G. Rajendran	ADMK	58,498	48.95	Aladi Aruna	DMK	54,387	45.51	4,111	3.44
Tirunelveli	218	Tirunelveli	Nainar Nagendran	ADMK	42,765	40.93	A.L. Subramanian	DMK	42,043	40.24	722	0.69
Tirunelveli	219	Palayamcottai	T.P.M. Mohideen Khan	DMK	55,934	53.13	S. Muthu Karuppan	ADMK	41,186	39.12	14,748	14.01
Tirunelveli	220	Cheranmahadevi	P. H. Manoj Pandian	ADMK	49,873	53.51	N. Chockalingam	BJP	38,898	41.74	10,975	11.77
Tirunelveli	221	Ambasamudram	M. Sakthivel Murugan	ADMK	43,021	48.04	R. Avudaiappan	DMK	39,001	43.55	4,020	4.49
Tirunelveli	222	Nanguneri	S. Manickaraj	ADMK	46,619	51.54	V. Ramachandran	MTD	37,458	41.41	9,161	10.13
Tirunelveli	223	Radhapuram	M. Appavu	IND	44,619	45.40	S. Jothi	PMK	26,338	26.80	18,281	18.60
Thoothukudi	224	Sattangulam	S. S. Mani Nadar	TMC	38,308	49.42	A. N. Rajakkannan	BJP	32,542	41.98	5,766	7.44
Thoothukudi	225	Tiruchendur	Anitha Radhakrishnan	ADMK	52,990	53.01	S. Jennifer Chandran	DMK	41,797	41.81	11,193	11.20
Thoothukudi	226	Srivaikuntam	S. P. Shunmuganathan	ADMK	39,739	46.58	S. David Selvyn	DMK	36,853	43.19	2,886	3.39
Thoothukudi	227	Tuticorin	S. Rajammal	ADMK	73,286	51.40	N. Periasamy	DMK	57,100	40.05	16,186	11.35
Kanniyakumari	228	Kanniyakumari	Thalavai Sundaram	ADMK	55,650	51.32	N. Suresh Rajan	DMK	46,114	42.52	9,536	8.80
Kanniyakumari	229	Nagercoil	S. Austin	MADMK	48,583	44.11	M. Moses	TMC	44,921	40.78	3,662	3.33
Kanniyakumari	230	Colachel	K. T. Pachaimal	ADMK	42,354	46.23	R. Sambath Chandra	MDMK	27,265	29.76	15,089	16.47
Kanniyakumari	231	Padmanabhapuram	K. P. Rajendra Ps.	ADMK	36,223	42.94	C. Velayudham	BJP	33,449	39.66	2,774	3.28
Kanniyakumari	232	Thiruvattar	J. Hemachandran	CPM	47,807	50.06	P. Rajamony	BJP	28,310	29.64	19,497	20.42
Kanniyakumari	233	Vilavancode	D. Moni	CPM	59,087	56.75	P. Jeevaraj	DMK	36,168	34.74	22,919	22.01
Kanniyakumari	234	Killiyoor	D. Kumaradas	TMC	40,075	49.16	C. Santhakumar	BJP	26,315	32.28	13,760	16.88

== Strike Rate ==
Strike rate is determined by calculating the number of seats won by a party of the number of seats it contested.

Alliance/ Party		Seats contested	Seats Won	Strike Rate
SDPF	AIADMK	141	132	93.61%
SDPF	TMC(M)	32	23	71.87%
SDPF	PMK	27	20	74.07%
SDPF	INC	14	7	50.00%
SDPF	CPI(M)	8	6	75.00%
SDPF	CPI	8	5	62.50%
SDPF	AIFB	1	1	100%
SDPF	INL	1	1	100%
SDPF	Independent	1	1	100%
SDPF	Total	234	196	83.76%
NDA	DMK	184	31	16.84%
NDA	BJP	21	4	19.04%
NDA	MADMK	3	2	66.66%
NDA	Total	234	37	15.81%

== Aftermath ==
The coalition at the AIADMK led-center would prove to be short-lived, since in less than a year, Pattali Makkal Katchi, and its leader Dr. Ramdoss, left the coalition, citing authoritarian type rule by J. Jayalalithaa (It is noteworthy that this is the first time in Indian history that a person has taken oath as the Chief Minister of a state the day after the counting of votes has been completed.) (Former election commissioner T. N. Seshan & Vazhappady K. Ramamurthy recommended governor to make Jayalalithaa as CM). Also the Tamil Maanila Congress, who proved to be an important ally for the victory of AIADMK, would later merge with Indian National Congress, who would later support DMK led front in future elections. The left parties would also end up joining the DMK led front, leaving the AIADMK coalition after this election.

== Bypolls (2001–2006) ==
Date	Constituency	MLA before election	Party before election	Elected MLA	Party after election
21 February 2002	Andipatti	Thanga Tamil Selvan	All India Anna Dravida Munnetra Kazhagam	J. Jayalalithaa	All India Anna Dravida Munnetra Kazhagam
31 May 2002	Saidapet	V. Perumal	Dravida Munnetra Kazhagam	Radha Ravi	All India Anna Dravida Munnetra Kazhagam
31 May 2002	Vaniyambadi	M. Abdul Lathief	Independent	R. Vadivel	All India Anna Dravida Munnetra Kazhagam
31 May 2002	Acharapakkam	A. Selvaraj	Pattali Makkal Katchi	A. Boovaragamoorthy	All India Anna Dravida Munnetra Kazhagam
26 February 2003	Sathankulam	S. S. Mani Nadar	Tamil Maanila Congress	Neelamega Varnan	All India Anna Dravida Munnetra Kazhagam
10 May 2004	Mangalore	Thol. Thirumavalavan	Dravida Munnetra Kazhagam	C. V. Ganesan	Dravida Munnetra Kazhagam
14 May 2005	Gummidipoondi	K. Sudarsanam	All India Anna Dravida Munnetra Kazhagam	K. S. Vijayakumar	All India Anna Dravida Munnetra Kazhagam
14 May 2005	Kancheepuram	S. S. Thirunavukkarasu	All India Anna Dravida Munnetra Kazhagam	Mythili Thirunavukkarasu	All India Anna Dravida Munnetra Kazhagam

== See also ==
- Elections in Tamil Nadu
- Legislature of Tamil Nadu
- Government of Tamil Nadu
