= P. L. Sundaram =

Indian politician

Member of the Tamil Nadu Legislative Assembly
- In office 13 May 2011 – 19 May 2016
- Preceded by: Subramaniam. O
- Succeeded by: Eswaran. S
- Constituency: Bhavanisagar

Personal details
- Party: Communist Party of India

P. L. Sundaram is an Indian politician and incumbent Member of the Tamil Nadu Legislative Assembly from the Bhavanisagar constituency from 2011 to 2016. He represents the Communist Party of India party.

== Electoral performance ==
| Election | Constituency | Political party | Result | Vote % | Opposition | | | Ref |
| Election | Constituency | Political party | Result | Vote % | Candidate | Political party | Vote % | Ref |
|---|---|---|---|---|---|---|---|---|
| 2011 | Bhavanisagar | CPI | Won | 50.69% | R. Logeswari | DMK | 38.83% | |
| 2016 | Bhavanisagar | CPI | Lost | 14.23% | S. Eswaran | AIADMK | 42.23% | |
| 2021 | Bhavanisagar | CPI | Lost | 41.89% | A. Bannari | AIADMK | 49.95% | - |
| 2026 | Bhavanisagar | CPI | Lost | 29.41% | V. P. Tamilselvi | TVK | 33.73% | - |
