= K. Ponnusamy =

K. Ponnusamy may refer to:

- K. Ponnusamy (AIADMK politician), member of the Tamil Nadu Legislative Assembly for Dharapuram
- K. Ponnusamy (DMK politician), member of the Tamil Nadu Legislative Assembly for Senthamangalam
