= Marungapuri Assembly constituency =

One of the 234 State Legislative Assembly Constituencies in Tamil Nadu, in India

Coordinates: 10.45°N 78.43°E

Marungapuri
- Former constituency for the Tamil Nadu Legislative Assembly

Constituency details
- Country: India
- Region: South India
- State: Tamil Nadu
- District: Tiruchirappalli
- Established: 1977
- Abolished: 2008
- Total electors: 1,87,713

Marungapuri was a state assembly constituency in Tiruchirappalli district in Tamil Nadu. It is one of the 234 State Legislative Assembly Constituencies in Tamil Nadu, in India.

== Members of the Legislative Assembly ==
Year	Winner	Party
1971	N. Kittappa	Dravida Munnetra Kazhagam
1977	K. Karunaigiri Muthiah	Indian National Congress
1980	M. A. Rajkumar	All India Anna Dravida Munnetra Kazhagam
1984	P. Sholairaj	All India Anna Dravida Munnetra Kazhagam
1989	K. Ponnusamy	All India Anna Dravida Munnetra Kazhagam
1991	K. Ponnusamy	All India Anna Dravida Munnetra Kazhagam
1996	B. M. Senguttuvan	Dravida Munnetra Kazhagam
2001	V. A. Chellaiyah	All India Anna Dravida Munnetra Kazhagam
2006	C. Chinnasamy	All India Anna Dravida Munnetra Kazhagam

== Election results ==
=== 2006 ===
2006 Tamil Nadu Legislative Assembly election: Marungapuri
Party	Candidate	Votes	%	±%
AIADMK	C. Chinnasamy	57,910	42.87	−11.05
DMK	A. Rokkaiah	55,378	41.00	7.84
BJP	T. Kumar @ B. T. Kumar	9,503	7.04	
DMDK	M. Jamal Mohamed	5,376	3.98	
Independent	V. Periasamy	1,763	1.31	
BSP	P. Subramani	1,359	1.01	
Independent	A. Francis	1,143	0.85	
LJP	C. Sakthivel	1,075	0.80	
Independent	M. Pandithurai	513	0.38	
Independent	S. Pitchaimani	425	0.31	
Independent	P. Alagar	364	0.27	
Margin of victory		2,532	1.87	−18.89
Turnout		135,080	71.96	8.63
Registered electors		187,713		
AIADMK hold		Swing	-11.05	

=== 2001 ===
2001 Tamil Nadu Legislative Assembly election: Marungapuri
Party	Candidate	Votes	%	±%
AIADMK	V. A. Chelliah	65,619	53.92	12.38
DMK	B. M. Senguttuvan	40,347	33.16	−13.70
MDMK	A. Durairaj	11,796	9.69	0.49
Independent	A. M. Sharfudeen	2,418	1.99	
JD(U)	Susila Rani H	1,508	1.24	
Margin of victory		25,272	20.77	15.45
Turnout		121,688	63.33	−8.44
Registered electors		192,283		
AIADMK gain from DMK		Swing	7.06	

=== 1996 ===
1996 Tamil Nadu Legislative Assembly election: Marungapuri
Party	Candidate	Votes	%	±%
DMK	B. M. Senguttuvan	56,380	46.86	16.63
AIADMK	K. Solairaj	49,986	41.54	−25.34
MDMK	A. Durairaj	11,074	9.20	
BJP	S. Thangavelu	1,259	1.05	−1.38
PMK	P. Charless Samidas	1,105	0.92	
Independent	K. Thirupathi	253	0.21	
Independent	S. Raju	167	0.14	
Independent	V. Palanimuthu	94	0.08	
Margin of victory		6,394	5.31	−31.33
Turnout		120,318	71.76	0.01
Registered electors		175,887		
DMK gain from AIADMK		Swing	-20.02	

=== 1991 ===
1991 Tamil Nadu Legislative Assembly election: Marungapuri
Party	Candidate	Votes	%	±%
AIADMK	K. Ponnusamy	76,476	66.88	16.90
DMK	N. Selvaraj	34,572	30.23	−9.78
BJP	Solai Gounder	2,776	2.43	
Independent	Arockiam	186	0.16	
Independent	Joseph	173	0.15	
THMM	Ramaiah	165	0.14	
Margin of victory		41,904	36.65	26.68
Turnout		114,348	71.76	−6.88
Registered electors		163,372		
AIADMK hold		Swing	16.90	

=== 1989 ===
1989 Tamil Nadu Legislative Assembly election: Marungapuri
Party	Candidate	Votes	%	±%
AIADMK	K. Ponnusamy	55,297	49.98	−19.39
DMK	B. Senguttuvan	44,274	40.01	
INC	S. A. Dorai Sebatstian	9,054	8.18	
Independent	K. Subramaniyan	441	0.40	
Independent	M. Srinivasan	409	0.37	
Independent	K. Subramaniyan	379	0.34	
Independent	P. M. Subramaniam	144	0.13	
Independent	V. Marimuthu	133	0.12	
Independent	V. Sethuraman	128	0.12	
Independent	V. Muthukumar	114	0.10	
Independent	T. A. Savarimuthu	70	0.06	
Margin of victory		11,023	9.96	−32.68
Turnout		110,648	78.63	3.06
Registered electors		143,268		
AIADMK hold		Swing	-19.39	

=== 1984 ===
1984 Tamil Nadu Legislative Assembly election: Marungapuri
Party	Candidate	Votes	%	±%
AIADMK	K. Sholairaj	62,656	69.36	27.39
Independent	P. Ramasamy	24,135	26.72	
Independent	S. John Joseph	1,926	2.13	
Independent	Fathima Peter	966	1.07	
Independent	Subramanian	646	0.72	
Margin of victory		38,521	42.65	37.96
Turnout		90,329	75.58	9.48
Registered electors		126,822		
AIADMK hold		Swing	27.39	

=== 1980 ===
1980 Tamil Nadu Legislative Assembly election: Marungapuri
Party	Candidate	Votes	%	±%
AIADMK	M. A. Raj Kumar	32,021	41.98	20.68
INC	V. Ramanathan	28,444	37.29	−1.30
Independent	N. Vairamani Gounder	14,013	18.37	
Independent	K. Andi	1,271	1.67	
Independent	P. K. M. Abdul Hussan	533	0.70	
Margin of victory		3,577	4.69	−9.84
Turnout		76,282	66.10	3.27
Registered electors		116,714		
AIADMK gain from INC		Swing	3.39	

=== 1977 ===
1977 Tamil Nadu Legislative Assembly election: Marungapuri
Party	Candidate	Votes	%	±%
INC	K. Karunaigiri Muthiah	27,093	38.58	
DMK	A. P. Raju	16,894	24.06	
AIADMK	M. A. Rajakumar	14,954	21.30	
JP	E. V. Kandaswamy	9,987	14.22	
Independent	A. Nookkiah Konar	1,292	1.84	
Margin of victory		10,199	14.52	
Turnout		70,220	62.83	
Registered electors		113,252		
INC win (new seat)				
