= V. K. Chinnasamy =

Indian politician

V. K. Chinnasamy is an Indian politician and former Member of the Legislative Assembly of Tamil Nadu. He was elected to the Tamil Nadu legislative assembly as an Anna Dravida Munnetra Kazhagam candidate from Bhavanisagar constituency in 1977, 1984 and 1991 elections and as an Anna Dravida Munnetra Kazhagam (Jayalalitha) candidate in 1989 election.

== Electoral performance ==
Election	Constituency	Political party	Result	Vote %	Opposition			Ref
Election	Constituency	Political party	Result	Vote %	Candidate	Political party	Vote %	Ref
1977	Bhavanisagar	AIADMK	Won	32.48%	Swaminothan Sampoornam	DMK	30.44%	
1984	Bhavanisagar	AIADMK	Won	59.06%	S. V. Vellingiri S. Alias Giri	JP	40.18%	
1989	Bhavanisagar	AIADMK	Won	37.44%	P. A. Swamynathan	DMK	30.44%	
1991	Bhavanisagar	AIADMK	Won	62.74%	O. Subramaniam	DMK	20.65%	
1996	Bhavanisagar	AIADMK	Lost	34.62%	V. A. Andamuthu	DMK	54.89%	
