= O. Subramaniam =

Indian politician

Jiva O. Subramaniam was elected to the Tamil Nadu Legislative Assembly from the Bhavanisagar constituency in the 2006 elections. He was a candidate of the Dravida Munnetra Kazhagam (DMK) party.

== Electoral performance ==
Election	Constituency	Political party	Result	Vote %	Opposition			Ref
Election	Constituency	Political party	Result	Vote %	Candidate	Political party	Vote %	Ref
1991	Bhavanisagar	DMK	Lost	20.65%	V. K. Chinnasamy	AIADMK	62.74%	
2001	Bhavanisagar	DMK	Lost	38.58%	P. Chithambaram	AIADMK	47.67%	
2006	Bhavanisagar	DMK	Won	50.79%	Sindu Ravichandaran	AIADMK	35.16%	
