= V. A. Andamuthu =

Indian politician (died 2023)

Member of the Tamil Nadu Legislative Assembly
- In office 1996–2001
- Constituency: Bhavanisagar

Personal details
- Died: 25 August 2023
- Party: Dravida Munnetra Kazhagam (DMK)

V. A. Andamuthu (died 25 August 2023) was an Indian politician. He was elected to the Tamil Nadu Legislative Assembly from the Bhavanisagar constituency in the 1996 elections. Andamuthu was a candidate of the Dravida Munnetra Kazhagam (DMK) party.

== Career ==
In April 1997, together with fellow DMK politicians P. Selvaraj and S. K. Rajendran, Andamuthu irked Karunanidhi, the Chief Minister, by praying for the continuation of the DMK government. They did so by walking on burning coals at the Pannari Amman temple, near Salem. The atheist Karunanidhi said "I am not bothered how long my government lasts. I am worried about how long it will adhere to the principles of rationalism." He threatened to expel from the party any person who emulated the act.

Andamuthu died on 25 August 2023.

== Electoral performance ==
Election	Constituency	Political party	Result	Vote %	Opposition			Ref
Election	Constituency	Political party	Result	Vote %	Candidate	Political party	Vote %	Ref
1996	Bhavanisagar	DMK	Won	54.89%	V. K. Chinnasamy	AIADMK	34.62%	
