= A. Bannari =

Indian politician

Member of the Tamil Nadu Legislative Assembly
- In office 12 May 2021 – 6 May 2026
- Preceded by: S. Eswaran
- Succeeded by: V. P. Tamilselvi
- Constituency: Bhavanisagar

Personal details
- Born: 12 May 1979 (age 47)
- Party: All India Anna Dravida Munnetra Kazhagam
- Parent: Ammavasai (father)
- Occupation: Politician

Ammavasai Bannari is an Indian politician. He is a member of the All India Anna Dravida Munnetra Kazhagam party. He was elected as a member of Tamil Nadu Legislative Assembly from Bhavanisagar Constituency in May 2021.

== Electoral performance ==
Election	Constituency	Political party	Result	Vote %	Opposition			Ref
Election	Constituency	Political party	Result	Vote %	Candidate	Political party	Vote %	Ref
2021	Bhavanisagar	AIADMK	Won	49.95%	P. L. Sundaram	CPI	41.89%	-
2026	Bhavanisagar	AIADMK	Lost	31.60%	V. P. Tamilselvi	TVK	33.73%	
