= Bhavanisagar Assembly constituency =

State Legislative Assembly Constituency in Tamil Nadu

Coordinates: 11.478258°N 77.1236157°E

Bhavanisagar
- Constituency No. 107 for the Tamil Nadu Legislative Assembly

Constituency details
- Country: India
- Region: South India
- State: Tamil Nadu
- District: Erode
- Lok Sabha constituency: Nilgiris
- Established: 1967
- Total electors: 2,37,629
- Reservation: SC

Member of Legislative Assembly
- 17th Tamil Nadu Legislative Assembly
- Incumbent V. P. Tamilselvi
- Party: TVK
- Alliance: TVK+
- Elected year: 2026

Bhavanisagar is a state assembly constituency in Erode district in Tamil Nadu. Its State Assembly Constituency number is 107. It comes under Nilgiris Lok Sabha constituency. It is one of the 234 State Legislative Assembly Constituencies in Tamil Nadu, in India.

== Members of the Legislative Assembly ==
Election	Member	Party
1967	Ramarasan	Dravida Munnetra Kazhagam
1971	V. K. Ramarasan	Dravida Munnetra Kazhagam
1977	V. K. Chinnasamy	All India Anna Dravida Munnetra Kazhagam
1980	G. K. Subramaniam	All India Anna Dravida Munnetra Kazhagam
1984	V. K. Chinnasamy	All India Anna Dravida Munnetra Kazhagam
1989	V. K. Chinnasamy	All India Anna Dravida Munnetra Kazhagam
1991	V. K. Chinnasamy	All India Anna Dravida Munnetra Kazhagam
1996	V. A. Andamuthu	Dravida Munnetra Kazhagam
2001	P. Chithambaram	All India Anna Dravida Munnetra Kazhagam
2006	O. Subramaniam	Dravida Munnetra Kazhagam
2011	P. L. Sundaram	Communist Party of India
2016	S. Eswaran	All India Anna Dravida Munnetra Kazhagam
2021	A. Bannari	All India Anna Dravida Munnetra Kazhagam
2026	V. P. Tamilselvi	Tamilaga Vettri Kazhagam

Madras State

== Election results ==
=== Assembly election 2026 ===
2026 Tamil Nadu Legislative Assembly election : Bhavanisagar
Party	Candidate	Votes	%	±%
TVK	V. P. Tamilselvi	72,391	33.73	New
AIADMK	A. Bannari	67,822	31.60	New
CPI	P. L. Sundaram	63,107	29.41	▼12.48
NTK	S. Soundarya	5,832	2.72	▼1.57
NOTA	None of the above	1,804	0.84	▼0.17
Margin of victory		4,569	2.13	▼5.93
Turnout		214,838	90.41	▲12.45
Total valid votes		214,595		
Registered electors		237,629		▼8.69
TVK gain from AIADMK		Swing	▼16.22	

=== Assembly election 2021 ===
2021 Tamil Nadu Legislative Assembly election : Bhavanisagar
Party	Candidate	Votes	%	±%
AIADMK	A. Bannari	99,181	49.95	▲7.72
CPI	P. L. Sundaram	83,173	41.89	▲27.66
NTK	V. Sangeetha	8,517	4.29	▲3.65
MNM	K. Karthikkumar	4,297	2.16	New
DMDK	G. Ramesh	2,197	1.11	New
NOTA	None of the above	2,005	1.01	▼0.51
BSP	G. Sakthivel	1,197	0.60	▲0.01
Margin of victory		16,008	8.06	▲1.39
Turnout		202,895	77.96	▼4.01
Total valid votes		198,562		
Rejected ballots		265	0.13	▲0.13
Registered electors		260,249		▲8.54
AIADMK hold		Swing		

=== Assembly election 2016 ===
2016 Tamil Nadu Legislative Assembly election : Bhavanisagar
Party	Candidate	Votes	%	±%
AIADMK	S. Eswaran	83,006	42.23	New
DMK	R. Sathya	69,902	35.56	▼3.27
CPI	P. L. Sundaram	27,965	14.23	▼36.46
BJP	N. R. Palaniswami	3,557	1.81	▼0.91
NOTA	None of the above	2,980	1.52	New
PMK	N. R. Vadivel	1,485	0.76	New
Independent	M. Lakshmi	1,367	0.70	
KMDK	T. Nagarajan	1,352	0.69	New
NTK	G. Sangeetha	1,251	0.64	New
Margin of victory		13,104	6.67	▼5.20
Turnout		196,558	81.97	▼0.06
Total valid votes		196,551		
Rejected ballots		7	0.00	▼0.09
Registered electors		239,778		▲20.19
AIADMK gain from CPI		Swing	▼8.46	

=== Assembly election 2011 ===
2011 Tamil Nadu Legislative Assembly election : Bhavanisagar
Party	Candidate	Votes	%	±%
CPI	P. L. Sundaram	82,890	50.69	New
DMK	R. Logeswari	63,487	38.83	▼11.96
BJP	R. Palaniswami	4,440	2.72	▲1.50
Independent	J. Jayaraman	2,848	1.74	
BSP	S. R. Arumugam	2,287	1.40	▲1.06
Independent	M. Murugan	1,969	1.20	
Independent	B. Gopal	1,709	1.05	
Independent	N. Palanisamy	1,194	0.73	
Independent	P. Murugan	1,067	0.65	
Margin of victory		19,403	11.87	▼3.76
Turnout		163,657	82.03	▲6.87
Total valid votes		163,511		
Rejected ballots		146	0.09	▲0.09
Registered electors		199,502		▲16.82
CPI gain from DMK		Swing	▼0.10	

=== Assembly election 2006 ===
2006 Tamil Nadu Legislative Assembly election : Bhavanisagar
Party	Candidate	Votes	%	±%
DMK	O. Subramaniam	65,055	50.79	▲12.21
AIADMK	Sindu Ravichandaran	45,039	35.16	New
DMDK	K. Subramanian	10,399	8.12	New
Independent	Arumugan	2,440	1.90	
Independent	Venkatraj	1,782	1.39	
BJP	P. Thamarai Manalan	1,567	1.22	New
Independent	Veeran	966	0.75	
Margin of victory		20,016	15.63	▲6.54
Turnout		128,357	75.16	▲12.38
Total valid votes		128,086		
Registered electors		170,773		▼5.22
DMK gain from AIADMK		Swing	▲3.12	

=== Assembly election 2001 ===
2001 Tamil Nadu Legislative Assembly election : Bhavanisagar
Party	Candidate	Votes	%	±%
AIADMK	P. Chithambaram	53,879	47.67	▲13.05
DMK	O. Subramaniam	43,604	38.58	▼16.31
Independent	R. Sakthivel	5,326	4.71	
MDMK	S. Balasubramanian	3,086	2.73	▼4.83
Independent	K. S. Muthusami	2,845	2.52	
Independent	P. Shanmugasundaram	2,563	2.27	
Independent	V. Bathran Alais Puratchi Bathran	994	0.88	
Margin of victory		10,275	9.09	▼11.19
Turnout		113,107	62.78	▼10.75
Total valid votes		113,036		
Rejected ballots		71	0.06	▼4.14
Registered electors		180,170		▲9.69
AIADMK gain from DMK		Swing	▼7.22	

=== Assembly election 1996 ===
1996 Tamil Nadu Legislative Assembly election : Bhavanisagar
Party	Candidate	Votes	%	±%
DMK	V. A. Andamuthu	63,483	54.89	▲34.24
AIADMK	V. K. Chinnasamy	40,032	34.62	New
MDMK	T. K. Subramaniam	8,742	7.56	New
BJP	R. Venkatachalam	1,018	0.88	▼0.67
Margin of victory		23,451	20.28	▼21.82
Turnout		120,765	73.53	▲5.62
Total valid votes		115,646		
Rejected ballots		5,069	4.20	▲0.45
Registered electors		164,250		▲6.07
DMK gain from AIADMK		Swing	▼7.85	

=== Assembly election 1991 ===
1991 Tamil Nadu Legislative Assembly election : Bhavanisagar
Party	Candidate	Votes	%	±%
AIADMK	V. K. Chinnasamy	63,474	62.74	New
DMK	O. Subramaniam	20,887	20.65	▼9.79
Independent	K. L. Ramasamy	13,347	13.19	
BJP	G. M. Krishnamoorthy	1,565	1.55	New
THMM	R. Gunasekaran	751	0.74	New
Margin of victory		42,587	42.10	▲35.11
Turnout		105,164	67.91	▼9.49
Total valid votes		101,166		
Rejected ballots		3,948	3.75	▲1.33
Registered electors		154,848		▲10.23
AIADMK gain from AIADMK		Swing	▲25.30	

=== Assembly election 1989 ===
1989 Tamil Nadu Legislative Assembly election : Bhavanisagar
Party	Candidate	Votes	%	±%
AIADMK	V. K. Chinnasamy	39,716	37.44	New
DMK	P. A. Swamynathan	32,296	30.44	New
INC	P. A. Doraisamy	23,252	21.92	New
Independent	E. V. K. S. Elangovan	8,381	7.90	
Independent	N. Subramanian	765	0.72	
Margin of victory		7,420	6.99	▼11.89
Turnout		108,724	77.40	▲1.45
Total valid votes		106,088		
Rejected ballots		2,636	2.42	▼2.72
Registered electors		140,475		▲13.77
AIADMK gain from AIADMK		Swing	▼21.62	

=== Assembly election 1984 ===
1984 Tamil Nadu Legislative Assembly election : Bhavanisagar
Party	Candidate	Votes	%	±%
AIADMK	V. K. Chinnasamy	52,539	59.06	▲10.78
JP	S. V. Vellingiri S. Alias Giri	35,743	40.18	New
Independent	P. P. Lakshmanan	682	0.77	
Margin of victory		16,796	18.88	▲5.47
Turnout		93,785	75.95	▲8.83
Total valid votes		88,964		
Rejected ballots		4,821	5.14	▲3.28
Registered electors		123,478		▲1.85
AIADMK hold		Swing		

=== Assembly election 1980 ===
1980 Tamil Nadu Legislative Assembly election : Bhavanisagar
Party	Candidate	Votes	%	±%
AIADMK	G. K. Subramaniam	38,557	48.28	New
DMK	Swaminothan Sampoornam	27,852	34.88	▲4.44
JP	N. K. Karuppuswamy	12,778	16.00	New
Margin of victory		10,705	13.41	▲11.37
Turnout		81,368	67.12	▲5.29
Total valid votes		79,858		
Rejected ballots		1,510	1.86	▲0.18
Registered electors		121,236		▲3.73
AIADMK gain from AIADMK		Swing	▲15.80	

=== Assembly election 1977 ===
1977 Tamil Nadu Legislative Assembly election : Bhavanisagar
Party	Candidate	Votes	%	±%
AIADMK	V. K. Chinnasamy	23,078	32.48	New
DMK	Swaminothan Sampoornam	21,631	30.44	▼21.45
JP	K. Karuppanan	13,027	18.33	New
INC	T. K. Marisamy	11,428	16.08	New
Independent	Makalialias Mahalingam	623	0.88	
Independent	S. V. Krishnasamy	475	0.67	
Margin of victory		1,447	2.04	▼10.95
Turnout		72,269	61.83	▼7.41
Total valid votes		71,052		
Rejected ballots		1,217	1.68	▲1.68
Registered electors		116,879		▲41.61
AIADMK gain from DMK		Swing	▼19.41	

=== Assembly election 1971 ===
1971 Tamil Nadu Legislative Assembly election : Bhavanisagar
Party	Candidate	Votes	%	±%
DMK	V. K. Ramarasan	28,003	51.89	▲0.13
INC	M. Velusamy	20,992	38.89	New
Independent	R. Kasiappan	4,370	8.10	
Independent	K. A. Palaniappan	606	1.12	
Margin of victory		7,011	12.99	▲3.79
Turnout		57,149	69.24	▼3.15
Total valid votes		53,971		
Registered electors		82,534		▲8.33
DMK hold		Swing		

=== Assembly election 1967 ===
1967 Madras State Legislative Assembly election : Bhavanisagar
Party	Candidate	Votes	%	±%
DMK	Ramarasan	26,980	51.76	New
INC	M. Velusamy	22,187	42.57	New
RPI	V. Kuravan	2,954	5.67	New
Margin of victory		4,793	9.20	
Turnout		55,156	72.39	
Total valid votes		52,121		
Registered electors		76,191		
DMK win (new seat)				
