= K. Ponnusamy (AIADMK politician) =

Indian politician

K. Ponnusamy Sundar is a politician and Deputy leaders of the opposition in the Tamil Nadu Legislative Assembly and Former Minister for school Education .from the Indian state of Tamil Nadu. He was elected to the Tamil Nadu legislative assembly as an Anna Dravida Munnetra Kazhagam candidate from Marungapuri constituency in 1989 and 1991 elections. He served as education minister in Jayalalitha cabinet formed after 1991 election.
