= V. P. Tamilselvi =

Indian politician

Member of the Tamil Nadu Legislative Assembly
- Incumbent
- Assumed office 11 May 2026
- Preceded by: A. Bannari
- Constituency: Bhavanisagar

Personal details
- Party: Tamilaga Vettri Kazhagam
- Spouse: A. Sivakumar
- Occupation: Owner Tamil Beauty Salon, Politician, Former Principal (Retired)

V. P. Tamilselvi (born 1969) is an Indian politician from Tamil Nadu. She is a Member of the Legislative Assembly from Bhavanisagar Assembly constituency which is reserved for Scheduled Caste community in Erode district representing Tamilaga Vettri Kazhagam Party.

She became an MLA for the first time winning the 2026 Tamil Nadu Legislative Assembly election from Bhavanisagar Assembly constituency on TVK ticket. She 72,391 votes and defeated her nearest rival, A. Bannari of the All India Anna Dravida Munnetra Kazhagam, by a margin of 4,569 votes.

== Electoral performance ==
Election	Constituency	Political party	Result	Vote %	Opposition			Ref
Election	Constituency	Political party	Result	Vote %	Candidate	Political party	Vote %	Ref
2026	Bhavanisagar	TVK	Won	33.73%	A. Bannari	AIADMK	31.60%	-
