= B. M. Senguttuvan =

Indian politician (died 2021)

B. M. Senguttuvan (1940/1 – 2 July 2021) was an Indian politician.

He was elected to the Tamil Nadu Legislative Assembly from the Marungapuri constituency in the 1996 elections, as a candidate of the Dravida Munnetra Kazhagam (DMK) party.

He died on 2 July 2021 from post COVID-19 complications, during the COVID-19 pandemic in India.
