= All India Moovendar Munnani Kazhagam =

- Leader: Dr. N. Sedhuraman
- Founded: 1998
- Headquarters: Lake Area, Melur Road, Madurai – 625107
- Ideology: Thevar interests

All India Moovendar Munnani Kazhagam is a Tamil political party in India, based amongst the thevar caste. The party founder and president is Dr. N. Sedhuraman. The party was founded by All India Thevar Peravai (All India Thevar Front) in 1998.

== Performance ==
All India Moovendar Munnani Kazhagam first allied with Dravida Munnetra Kazhagam. In the Tamil Nadu legislative assembly elections of 2001 one candidate of All India Moovendar Munnani Kazhagam was launched on a DMK symbol in the constituency of Thirumangalam and got 39,918 votes (36.2%, no seat). In 2006 elections the party contested in 5 constituencies with alliance with BJP and lost in all the 5 seats without deposit. The Party is now in alliance with All India Anna Dravidar Munnetra Kazhagam from August 2006.

== 2011 Assembly elections ==
The party sealed alliance with AIADMK and has been allocated 1 seat for the 2011 elections. They have lost even this election
