= Kongunadu Makkal Katchi =

- Leader: A.M. Raja
- General Secretary: S.Srivignesh
- Headquarters: TTS Complex-58, Mettur Road, Erode District-638011, Tamil Nadu
- ECI status: Registered Unrecognised Party

Party flag
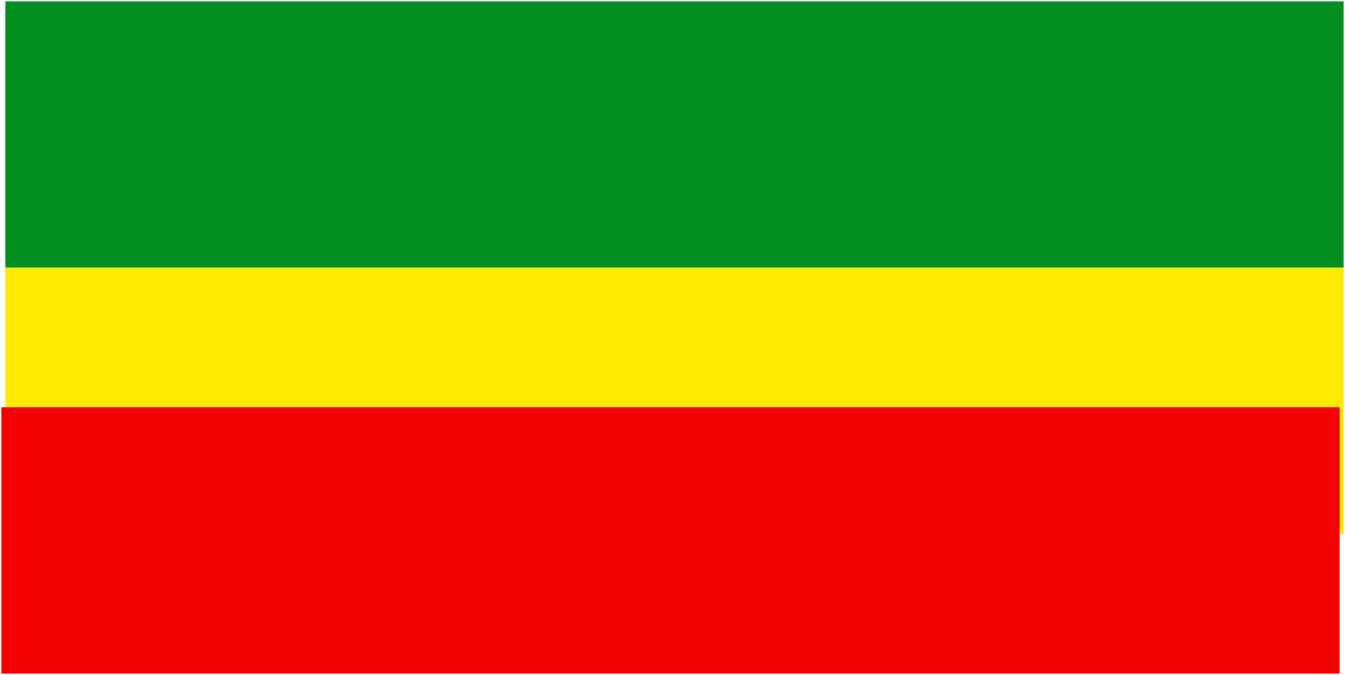

Kongunadu Makkal Katchi (Tamil: கொங்குநாடு மக்கள் கட்சி) is a political party in Tamil Nadu, India, based amongst the Vellala Gounder caste. The party was founded shortly ahead of the 2001 Tamil Nadu Legislative Assembly election.

The party is led by A.M. Raja. The party acts as the political wing of the Kongu Vellala Gounder Forum.

In the 2001 Tamil Nadu assembly elections, KMK stood as an ally of the Dravida Munnetra Kazhagam. KMK contested one seat, Perundurai. Its candidate, N. Govindaswamy, got 40421 votes (32.43%).

== See also ==
- Kongu Nadu Statehood movement
- List of political parties in India
