= Makkal Tamil Desam Katchi =

Political party

Makkal Tamil Desam Katchi (People's Tamil Land Party, in Tamil: மக்கள் தமிழ் தேசம் கட்சி), generally just called Makkal Tamil Desam (MTD) is a political party in the Indian state of Tamil Nadu. MTD was founded on 22 August 2000. MTD has its base amongst the Yadava (Konar) (Ietaiyar) (Ietaiyan) caste in the north and southern parts of the state.

Flag of MTD

The Tamil Nadu Yadava Mahasabai supported the formation of the party. The party leader is S. Kannappan, a former All India Anna Dravida Munnetra Kazhagam (AIADMK) minister. Kannappan had been expelled from AIADMK before the foundation of MTD.

Ahead of the 2001 Tamil Nadu assembly elections MTD joined the National Democratic Alliance (NDA).

On 6 May 2002, the Puducherry unit of MTD broke away and joined Indian National Congress.

In the 2004 MTD took part in the People's Alliance, the third front in Tamil Nadu together with Janata Dal (United), Puthiya Tamizhagam and the Dalit Panthers of India. This front was basically formed by groups who were dissatisfied that Bharatiya Janata Party (BJP) had put NDA aside in Tamil Nadu and instead had launched a pure BJP-AIADMK front in the elections. MTD contested under the JD(U) symbol.

In 2006, before the assembly election the party was merged with Dravida Munnetra Kazhagam, and Raja Kannappan contested and won in Ilayankudi Assembly constituency.
