= List of by-elections to the Tamil Nadu Legislative Assembly =

The following is a list of by-elections held for the Tamil Nadu Legislative Assembly, India, since its formation in 1956.

== 13th Assembly ==
Date	Constituency		Previous MLA	Party	Reason	Elected MLA	Winning party	Alliance led by party
11 October 2006	140	Madurai Central	P. T. R. Palanivel Rajan	Dravida Munnetra Kazhagam	Died on 20 May 2006	Syed Ghouse Basha	Dravida Munnetra Kazhagam	Democratic Progressive Alliance (DMK-led)
26 June 2007	141	Madurai West	S. V. Shanmugam	All India Anna Dravida Munnetra Kazhagam	Died on 15 February 2007	K. S. K. Rajendran	Indian National Congress	Democratic Progressive Alliance (DMK-led)
9 January 2009	143	Thirumangalam	Veera Elavarasan	Marumalarchi Dravida Munnetra Kazhagam	Died on 28 August 2008	Latha Athiyaman	Dravida Munnetra Kazhagam	Democratic Progressive Alliance (DMK-led)
18 August 2009	54	Bargur	M. Thambidurai	All India Anna Dravida Munnetra Kazhagam	Resigned on 25 May 2009	K. R. K. Narasimhan	Dravida Munnetra Kazhagam	Democratic Progressive Alliance (DMK-led)
18 August 2009	106	Thondamuthur	M. Kannappan	Marumalarchi Dravida Munnetra Kazhagam	Resigned in February 2009	M. N. Kandaswamy	Indian National Congress	Democratic Progressive Alliance (DMK-led)
18 August 2009	196	Ilayangudi	R. S. Raja Kannappan	Dravida Munnetra Kazhagam	Resigned in February 2009	Suba. Mathiarasan	Dravida Munnetra Kazhagam	Democratic Progressive Alliance (DMK-led)
18 August 2009	132	Cumbum	N. Ramakrishnan	Marumalarchi Dravida Munnetra Kazhagam	Resigned in 2009	N. Ramakrishnan	Dravida Munnetra Kazhagam	Democratic Progressive Alliance (DMK-led)
18 August 2009	220	Srivaikuntam	D. Selvaraj	Indian National Congress	Died on 5 July 2009	M. B. Sudalaiyandi	Indian National Congress	Democratic Progressive Alliance (DMK-led)
19 December 2009	50	Vandavasi	S. P. Jayaraman	Dravida Munnetra Kazhagam	Died on 2 November 2009	P. Kamalakannan	Dravida Munnetra Kazhagam	Democratic Progressive Alliance (DMK-led)
19 December 2009	222	Tiruchendur	Anitha R. Radhakrishnan	All India Anna Dravida Munnetra Kazhagam	Resigned on 28 July 2009	Anitha R. Radhakrishnan	Dravida Munnetra Kazhagam	Democratic Progressive Alliance (DMK-led)
27 March 2010	59	Pennagaram	P. N. Periannan	Dravida Munnetra Kazhagam	Died on 1 December 2009	P. N. P. Inbasekaran	Dravida Munnetra Kazhagam	Democratic Progressive Alliance (DMK-led)

== 14th Assembly ==
=== 2011 ===
S.No	Date	Constituency	MLA before election	Party before election	Elected MLA	Party after election
140	13 October 2011	Tiruchirappalli West	M. Mariam Pichai	All India Anna Dravida Munnetra Kazhagam	M. Paranjothi	All India Anna Dravida Munnetra Kazhagam

=== 2012 ===
S.No	Date	Constituency	MLA before election	Party before election	Elected MLA	Party after election
219	18 March 2012	Sankarankoil	C. Karuppasamy	All India Anna Dravida Munnetra Kazhagam	V. M. Rajalakshmi	All India Anna Dravida Munnetra Kazhagam
180	12 June 2012	Pudukkottai	S. P. Muthukumaran	Communist Party of India	V. R. Karthik Thondaiman	All India Anna Dravida Munnetra Kazhagam

=== 2013 ===
S.No	Date	Constituency	MLA before election	Party before election	Elected MLA	Party after election
83	23 February 2013	Yercaud	C. Perumal	All India Anna Dravida Munnetra Kazhagam	P. Saroja	All India Anna Dravida Munnetra Kazhagam

=== 2015 ===
S.No	Date	Constituency	MLA before election	Party before election	Elected MLA	Party after election
1	13 February 2015	Srirangam	J. Jayalalithaa	All India Anna Dravida Munnetra Kazhagam	S. Valarmathi	All India Anna Dravida Munnetra Kazhagam
2	27 June 2015	Radhakrishnan Nagar	P. Vetriivel	All India Anna Dravida Munnetra Kazhagam	J. Jayalalithaa	All India Anna Dravida Munnetra Kazhagam

== 15th Assembly ==
=== 2017 ===
Date	Constituency		Previous MLA	Party	Reason	Elected MLA	Winning party	Alliance led by party
21 December 2017	11	Dr. Radhakrishnan Nagar	J. Jayalalithaa	All India Anna Dravida Munnetra Kazhagam	Died on 5 December 2016	T. T. V. Dhinakaran	Independent politician	None

=== 2019 ===
Date	Constituency		Previous MLA	Party	Reason	Elected MLA	Winning party	Alliance led by party
18 April 2019	168	Thiruvarur	M. Karunanidhi	Dravida Munnetra Kazhagam	Died on 7 August 2018	K. Poondi Kalaivanan	Dravida Munnetra Kazhagam	Secular Progressive Alliance (DMK-led)
18 April 2019	48	Ambur	R. Balasubramani	All India Anna Dravida Munnetra Kazhagam	Disqualified on 18 September 2017	A. C. Vilwanathan	Dravida Munnetra Kazhagam	Secular Progressive Alliance (DMK-led)
18 April 2019	198	Andipatti	Thanga Tamil Selvan	All India Anna Dravida Munnetra Kazhagam	Disqualified on 18 September 2017	A. Maharajan	Dravida Munnetra Kazhagam	Secular Progressive Alliance (DMK-led)
18 April 2019	46	Gudiyattam	C. Jayanthi Padmanabhan	All India Anna Dravida Munnetra Kazhagam	Disqualified on 18 September 2017	S. Kathavarayan	Dravida Munnetra Kazhagam	Secular Progressive Alliance (DMK-led)
18 April 2019	55	Hosur	P. Balakrishna Reddy	All India Anna Dravida Munnetra Kazhagam	Convicted and disqualified on 7 January 2019	S. A. Sathya	Dravida Munnetra Kazhagam	Secular Progressive Alliance (DMK-led)
18 April 2019	12	Perambur	P. Vetrivel	All India Anna Dravida Munnetra Kazhagam	Disqualified on 18 September 2017	R. D. Sekar	Dravida Munnetra Kazhagam	Secular Progressive Alliance (DMK-led)
18 April 2019	199	Periyakulam	K. Kathirkamu	All India Anna Dravida Munnetra Kazhagam	Disqualified on 18 September 2017	S. Saravana Kumar	Dravida Munnetra Kazhagam	Secular Progressive Alliance (DMK-led)
18 April 2019	5	Poonamallee	T. A. Elumalai	All India Anna Dravida Munnetra Kazhagam	Disqualified on 18 September 2017	A. Krishnaswamy	Dravida Munnetra Kazhagam	Secular Progressive Alliance (DMK-led)
18 April 2019	174	Thanjavur	M. Rangaswamy	All India Anna Dravida Munnetra Kazhagam	Disqualified on 18 September 2017	T. K. G. Neelamegam	Dravida Munnetra Kazhagam	Secular Progressive Alliance (DMK-led)
18 April 2019	33	Thiruporur	M. Kothandapani	All India Anna Dravida Munnetra Kazhagam	Disqualified on 18 September 2017	L. Idhayavarman	Dravida Munnetra Kazhagam	Secular Progressive Alliance (DMK-led)
18 April 2019	61	Harur	R. Murugan	All India Anna Dravida Munnetra Kazhagam	Disqualified on 18 September 2017	V. Sampathkumar	All India Anna Dravida Munnetra Kazhagam	National Democratic Alliance (AIADMK-led)
18 April 2019	187	Manamadurai	S. Mariappankennady	All India Anna Dravida Munnetra Kazhagam	Disqualified on 18 September 2017	S. Nagarajan	All India Anna Dravida Munnetra Kazhagam	National Democratic Alliance (AIADMK-led)
18 April 2019	130	Nilakottai	R. Thangathurai	All India Anna Dravida Munnetra Kazhagam	Disqualified on 18 September 2017	S. Thenmozhi	All India Anna Dravida Munnetra Kazhagam	National Democratic Alliance (AIADMK-led)
18 April 2019	60	Pappireddyppatti	P. Palaniappan	All India Anna Dravida Munnetra Kazhagam	Disqualified on 18 September 2017	A. Govindasamy	All India Anna Dravida Munnetra Kazhagam	National Democratic Alliance (AIADMK-led)
18 April 2019	209	Paramakudi	S. Muthiah	All India Anna Dravida Munnetra Kazhagam	Disqualified on 18 September 2017	N. Sadhan Prabhakar	All India Anna Dravida Munnetra Kazhagam	National Democratic Alliance (AIADMK-led)
18 April 2019	204	Sattur	S. G. Subramanian	All India Anna Dravida Munnetra Kazhagam	Disqualified on 18 September 2017	M. S. R. Rajavarman	All India Anna Dravida Munnetra Kazhagam	National Democratic Alliance (AIADMK-led)
18 April 2019	39	Sholinghur	N. G. Parthiban	All India Anna Dravida Munnetra Kazhagam	Disqualified on 18 September 2017	G. Sampathu	All India Anna Dravida Munnetra Kazhagam	National Democratic Alliance (AIADMK-led)
18 April 2019	213	Vilathikulam	K. Uma Maheswari	All India Anna Dravida Munnetra Kazhagam	Disqualified on 18 September 2017	P. Chinnappan	All India Anna Dravida Munnetra Kazhagam	National Democratic Alliance (AIADMK-led)
19 May 2019	116	Sulur	R. Kanagaraj	All India Anna Dravida Munnetra Kazhagam	Died on 21 March 2019	P. Kandasamy	All India Anna Dravida Munnetra Kazhagam	National Democratic Alliance (AIADMK-led)
19 May 2019	134	Aravakurichi	V. Senthil Balaji	All India Anna Dravida Munnetra Kazhagam	Disqualified on 18 September 2017	V. Senthil Balaji	Dravida Munnetra Kazhagam	Secular Progressive Alliance (DMK-led)
19 May 2019	217	Ottapidaram	R. Sundararaj	All India Anna Dravida Munnetra Kazhagam	Disqualified on 18 September 2017	C. Shunmugaiah	Dravida Munnetra Kazhagam	Secular Progressive Alliance (DMK-led)
19 May 2019	195	Tirupparankundram	A. K. Bose	All India Anna Dravida Munnetra Kazhagam	Died on 2 August 2018	P. Saravanan	Dravida Munnetra Kazhagam	Secular Progressive Alliance (DMK-led)
21 October 2019	75	Vikravandi	K. Rathamani	Dravida Munnetra Kazhagam	Died on 14 June 2019	R. Muthamilselvan	All India Anna Dravida Munnetra Kazhagam	National Democratic Alliance (AIADMK-led)
21 October 2019	227	Nanguneri	H. Vasanthakumar	Indian National Congress	Resigned on 29 May 2019	V. Narayanan	All India Anna Dravida Munnetra Kazhagam	National Democratic Alliance (AIADMK-led)

== 16th Assembly ==
=== 2023 ===
Date	Constituency		Previous MLA	Party	Reason	Elected MLA	Winning party	Alliance led by party
27 February 2023	98	Erode (East)	Thirumagan Evera	Indian National Congress	Death on 4 January 2023	E. V. K. S. Elangovan	Indian National Congress	Secular Progressive Alliance (DMK-led)

=== 2024 ===
Date	Constituency		Previous MLA	Party	Reason	Elected MLA	Winning party	Alliance led by party
19 April 2024	233	Vilavancode	S. Vijayadharani	Indian National Congress	Resigned on 24 February 2024	Tharahai Cuthbert	Indian National Congress	Secular Progressive Alliance (DMK-led)
10 July 2024	75	Vikravandi	N. Pugazhenthi	Dravida Munnetra Kazhagam	Died on 6 April 2024	Anniyur Siva	Dravida Munnetra Kazhagam	Secular Progressive Alliance (DMK-led)

=== 2025 ===
Date	Constituency		Previous MLA	Party	Reason	Elected MLA	Winning party	Alliance led by party
5 February 2025	98	Erode (East)	E. V. K. S. Elangovan	Indian National Congress	Died on 14 December 2024	V. C. Chandhirakumar	Dravida Munnetra Kazhagam	Secular Progressive Alliance (DMK-led)

== 17th Assembly ==
=== 2026 ===
Date	Constituency		Previous MLA	Party	Reason	Elected MLA	Winning party	Alliance led by party
6 October 2026	35	Maduranthakam	Maragatham Kumaravel	All India Anna Dravida Munnetra Kazhagam	Resigned on 25 May 2026 and joined TVK	Maragatham Kumaravel	Tamilaga Vettri Kazhagam	Secular Social Justice Victory Alliance (TVK-led)
6 October 2026	101	Dharapuram	P. Sathyabama	All India Anna Dravida Munnetra Kazhagam	Resigned on 25 May 2026 and joined TVK	P. Sathyabama	Tamilaga Vettri Kazhagam	Secular Social Justice Victory Alliance (TVK-led)
TBD	103	Perundurai	S. Jayakumar	All India Anna Dravida Munnetra Kazhagam	Resigned on 25 May 2026 and joined TVK	TBD	TBD	TBD
TBD	135	Karur	M. R. Vijayabhaskar	All India Anna Dravida Munnetra Kazhagam	Resigned on 29 June 2026 and joined TVK	TBD	TBD	TBD
TBD	141	Tiruchirappalli East	C. Joseph Vijay	Tamilaga Vettri Kazhagam	Resigned on 10 May 2026, as he won Perambur as well	TBD	TBD	TBD
TBD	179	Viralimalai	C. Vijayabaskar	All India Anna Dravida Munnetra Kazhagam	Resigned on 16 June 2026 and joined TVK	TBD	TBD	TBD
TBD	225	Ambasamudram	E. Subaya	All India Anna Dravida Munnetra Kazhagam	Resigned on 26 May 2026	TBD	TBD	TBD
