= Villupuram Assembly constituency =

State Legislative Assembly Constituency in Tamil Nadu

Coordinates: 11.941°N 79.493°E

Villupuram
- Constituency No. 74 for the Tamil Nadu Legislative Assembly

Constituency details
- Country: India
- Region: South India
- State: Tamil Nadu
- District: Villupuram
- Lok Sabha constituency: Vilupuram
- Established: 1951
- Total electors: 2,45,994
- Reservation: None

Member of Legislative Assembly
- 17th Tamil Nadu Legislative Assembly
- Incumbent R. Lakshmanan
- Party: DMK
- Elected year: 2026

Villupuram is a state legislative assembly constituency in Viluppuram district in the Indian state of Tamil Nadu. Its State Assembly Constituency number is 74. It comprises a portion of Viluppuram taluk and is a part of Viluppuram Lok Sabha constituency for national elections to the Parliament of India. It is one of the 234 State Legislative Assembly Constituencies in Tamil Nadu.

Villupuram was one of 17 assembly constituencies to have voter-verified paper audit trail (VVPAT) facilities with EVMs in the state elections of 2016.

Most successful party: DMK (nine times).

== Members of Legislative Assembly ==
=== Madras State ===
Year	Winner	Party
1952	Nagarajan	Tamil Nadu Toilers' Party
1957	Sarangapani Gounder	Indian National Congress
1962	M. Shanmugam	Dravida Munnetra Kazhagam
1967	M. Shanmugam	Dravida Munnetra Kazhagam

=== Tamil Nadu ===
Year	Winner	Party
1971	M. Shanmugam	Dravida Munnetra Kazhagam
1977	P. Krishnan	All India Anna Dravida Munnetra Kazhagam
1980	K. P. Palaniappan	Dravida Munnetra Kazhagam
1984	M. Mani Rajarathinam	All India Anna Dravida Munnetra Kazhagam
1989	K. Ponmudy	Dravida Munnetra Kazhagam
1991	D. Janardhanan	All India Anna Dravida Munnetra Kazhagam
1996	K. Ponmudy	Dravida Munnetra Kazhagam
2001	K. Ponmudy	Dravida Munnetra Kazhagam
2006	K. Ponmudy	Dravida Munnetra Kazhagam
2011	C. V. Shanmugam	All India Anna Dravida Munnetra Kazhagam
2016	C. V. Shanmugam	All India Anna Dravida Munnetra Kazhagam
2021	R. Lakshmanan	Dravida Munnetra Kazhagam
2026	R. Lakshmanan	Dravida Munnetra Kazhagam

== Election results ==
Vote share of winning candidates
2026	33.88%
2021	50.16%
2016	36.74%
2011	52.18%
2006	46.87%
2001	47.45%
1996	58.24%
1991	48.82%
1989	47.18%
1984	52.71%
1980	52.02%
1977	37.69%
1971	51.41%
1967	53.73%
1962	59.36%
1957	50.87%
1952	43.46%

=== 2026 ===
2026 Tamil Nadu Legislative Assembly election: Villupuram
Party	Candidate	Votes	%	±%
DMK	Lakshmanan R	72,982	33.88	▼16.28
TVK	Mohanraj N	68,863	31.97	New
AIADMK	Vijayasureshbabu	63,808	29.62	▼13.25
NTK	Abinaya Ponnivalavan	5,786	2.69	▼0.44
NOTA	NOTA	573	0.27	
TVK	Kumaran R	440	0.20	New
BSP	Murugan S	390	0.18	New
Margin of victory		4,119	1.91	▼5.38
Turnout		2,15,422	87.57	▲9.77
Registered electors		2,45,994		▼16,074
DMK hold		Swing	▼16.28	

=== 2021 ===
2021 Tamil Nadu Legislative Assembly election: Villupuram
Party	Candidate	Votes	%	±%
DMK	R. Lakshmanan	102,271	50.16%	New entry
AIADMK	C. V. Shanmugam	87,403	42.87%	▲6.13
NTK	J. Selvam	6,375	3.13%	▲2.48
MNM	K. Dass	3,242	1.59%	New entry
AMMK	R. Balasundaram	1,695	0.83%	New entry
Margin of victory		14,868	7.29%	−4.50%
Turnout		203,890	77.80%	1.40%
Rejected ballots		286	0.14%	
Registered electors		262,068		
DMK gain from AIADMK		Swing	13.42%	

=== 2016 ===
2016 Tamil Nadu Legislative Assembly election: Villupuram
Party	Candidate	Votes	%	±%
AIADMK	C. V. Shanmugam	69,421	36.74%	−15.45
IUML	S. M. Ameer Abbas	47,130	24.94%	New
PMK	P. Palanivel	36,456	19.29%	New
DMDK	L. Venkatesan	24,907	13.18%	New
BJP	Jayakumar Rama	2,188	1.16%	+0.52
NOTA	NOTA	1,701	0.90%	New
NTK	K. Subramani	1,231	0.65%	New
Margin of victory		22,291	11.80%	4.81%
Turnout		188,964	76.40%	−6.24%
Registered electors		247,327		
AIADMK hold		Swing	-15.45%	

=== 2011 ===
2011 Tamil Nadu Legislative Assembly election: Villupuram
Party	Candidate	Votes	%	±%
AIADMK	C. V. Shanmugam	90,304	52.18%	+11.62
DMK	K. Ponmudy	78,207	45.19%	−1.68
BJP	C. Arokiyasamy	1,100	0.64%	−0.01
Margin of victory		12,097	6.99%	0.69%
Turnout		173,050	82.64%	9.94%
Registered electors		209,392		
AIADMK gain from DMK		Swing	5.31%	

=== 2006 ===
2006 Tamil Nadu Legislative Assembly election: Villupuram
Party	Candidate	Votes	%	±%
DMK	K. Ponmudy	72,462	46.87%	−0.58
AIADMK	R. Pasupathy	62,714	40.57%	New
DMDK	D. Duraisamy	13,621	8.81%	New
Independent	V. Vetriselvan	1,523	0.99%	New
BJP	V. Sukumar	994	0.64%	New
Independent	M. Mohamad Jakkiriya	845	0.55%	New
BSP	V. Vaikunthan	804	0.52%	−0.04
Margin of victory		9,748	6.31%	4.71%
Turnout		154,600	72.71%	11.30%
Registered electors		212,630		
DMK hold		Swing	-0.58%	

=== 2001 ===
2001 Tamil Nadu Legislative Assembly election: Villupuram
Party	Candidate	Votes	%	±%
DMK	K. Ponmudy	65,693	47.45%	−10.8
PMK	R. Pasupathy	63,488	45.86%	New
MDMK	V. Govindarajulu	2,982	2.15%	−5.41
Independent	K. Sadagopan	1,853	1.34%	New
Independent	M. Mohamed Ali Jinna	1,116	0.81%	New
Independent	V. Ponmudi	851	0.61%	New
BSP	G. Kaliyamoorthy	781	0.56%	New
Independent	C. Faruklal	704	0.51%	New
Margin of victory		2,205	1.59%	−30.75%
Turnout		138,453	61.40%	−8.06%
Registered electors		225,528		
DMK hold		Swing	-10.80%	

=== 1996 ===
1996 Tamil Nadu Legislative Assembly election: Villupuram
Party	Candidate	Votes	%	±%
DMK	K. Ponmudy	74,891	58.24%	+24.87
AIADMK	S. S. Panneer Selvam	33,305	25.90%	−22.92
MDMK	M. Panneer Selvam	9,727	7.56%	New
AIIC(T)	G. Janagiraman	8,331	6.48%	New
BJP	K. Mani	848	0.66%	New
Margin of victory		41,586	32.34%	16.89%
Turnout		128,581	69.46%	2.63%
Registered electors		190,500		
DMK gain from AIADMK		Swing	9.42%	

=== 1991 ===
1991 Tamil Nadu Legislative Assembly election: Villupuram
Party	Candidate	Votes	%	±%
AIADMK	D. Janaardhanan	55,105	48.82%	+32.99
DMK	K. Ponmudy	37,665	33.37%	−13.81
Independent	V. Krishna Murthy	18,304	16.22%	New
Independent	U. Mohamed Younus	636	0.56%	New
INS(SCS)	D. Deenadhayalan	598	0.53%	New
Margin of victory		17,440	15.45%	−8.34%
Turnout		112,866	66.83%	4.31%
Registered electors		176,980		
AIADMK gain from DMK		Swing	1.64%	

=== 1989 ===
1989 Tamil Nadu Legislative Assembly election: Villupuram
Party	Candidate	Votes	%	±%
DMK	K. Ponmudy	45,145	47.18%	+9.03
INC	S. Abdul Latheef	22,380	23.39%	New
AIADMK	P. Selvaraj	15,148	15.83%	−36.88
Independent	V. G. Chellappa	9,929	10.38%	New
Independent	M. Bala Shanmugam	1,038	1.08%	New
Margin of victory		22,765	23.79%	9.23%
Turnout		95,677	62.52%	−14.40%
Registered electors		156,154		
DMK gain from AIADMK		Swing	-5.53%	

=== 1984 ===
1984 Tamil Nadu Legislative Assembly election: Villupuram
Party	Candidate	Votes	%	±%
AIADMK	M. Rajarathinam Mani	50,156	52.71%	+6.54
DMK	K. P. Palaniappan	36,302	38.15%	−13.87
Independent	M. Balashanugam	7,562	7.95%	New
Independent	H. Sohan Lal Jain	661	0.69%	New
Margin of victory		13,854	14.56%	8.72%
Turnout		95,152	76.92%	10.09%
Registered electors		131,319		
AIADMK gain from DMK		Swing	0.69%	

=== 1980 ===
1980 Tamil Nadu Legislative Assembly election: Villupuram
Party	Candidate	Votes	%	±%
DMK	K. P. Palaniappan	45,952	52.02%	+17.98
AIADMK	M. Rajarathinam	40,792	46.18%	+8.49
Independent	Jothi V	1,065	1.21%	New
Independent	G. Ramakrishna Padayachi	531	0.60%	New
Margin of victory		5,160	5.84%	2.19%
Turnout		88,340	66.82%	3.05%
Registered electors		133,842		
DMK gain from AIADMK		Swing	14.33%	

=== 1977 ===
1977 Tamil Nadu Legislative Assembly election: Villupuram
Party	Candidate	Votes	%	±%
AIADMK	P. Krishnan	27,882	37.69%	New
DMK	K. P. Palaniappan	25,183	34.04%	−17.37
JP	L. Athikesavalu Naidu	12,161	16.44%	New
INC	T. Thirumal	8,754	11.83%	−29.14
Margin of victory		2,699	3.65%	−6.79%
Turnout		73,980	63.77%	−9.91%
Registered electors		117,651		
AIADMK gain from DMK		Swing	-13.73%	

=== 1971 ===
1971 Tamil Nadu Legislative Assembly election: Villupuram
Party	Candidate	Votes	%	±%
DMK	M. Shanmugam	35,838	51.41%	−2.32
INC	V. P. Sharangapani Gounder	28,562	40.98%	−4.28
Independent	A. Ramalingam	5,304	7.61%	New
Margin of victory		7,276	10.44%	1.96%
Turnout		69,704	73.68%	−3.67%
Registered electors		102,546		
DMK hold		Swing	-2.32%	

=== 1967 ===
1967 Madras Legislative Assembly election: Villupuram
Party	Candidate	Votes	%	±%
DMK	M. Shanmugam	37,605	53.73%	−5.63
INC	V. P. S. Gounder	31,674	45.26%	+6.43
Independent	T. S. Ramachandran	706	1.01%	New
Margin of victory		5,931	8.47%	−12.06%
Turnout		69,985	77.35%	5.11%
Registered electors		94,260		
DMK hold		Swing	-5.63%	

=== 1962 ===
1962 Madras Legislative Assembly election: Villupuram
Party	Candidate	Votes	%	±%
DMK	M. Shanmugam	39,923	59.36%	New
INC	V. P. Sarangapani Koundar	26,115	38.83%	−12.04
Independent	G. Kothandaraman Koundar	735	1.09%	New
Independent	A. Ramalingam	485	0.72%	New
Margin of victory		13,808	20.53%	18.79%
Turnout		67,258	72.24%	18.10%
Registered electors		96,487		
DMK gain from INC		Swing	8.49%	

=== 1957 ===
1957 Madras Legislative Assembly election: Villupuram
Party	Candidate	Votes	%	±%
INC	Sarangapani Gounder	25,000	50.87%	+15.81
Independent	Shanmugha Udayar	24,147	49.13%	New
Margin of victory		853	1.74%	−6.67%
Turnout		49,147	54.15%	−5.17%
Registered electors		90,763		
INC gain from TTP		Swing	7.40%	

=== 1952 ===
1952 Madras Legislative Assembly election: Villupuram
Party	Candidate	Votes	%	±%
TTP	Nagarajan	21,762	43.46%	New
INC	S. D. Chinnas Alias Reddy	17,555	35.06%	New
Independent	M. Shumuga U Yar	10,752	21.47%	New
Margin of victory		4,207	8.40%	
Turnout		50,069	59.32%	
Registered electors		84,403		
TTP win (new seat)				
