= C. V. Shanmugam =

Indian politician

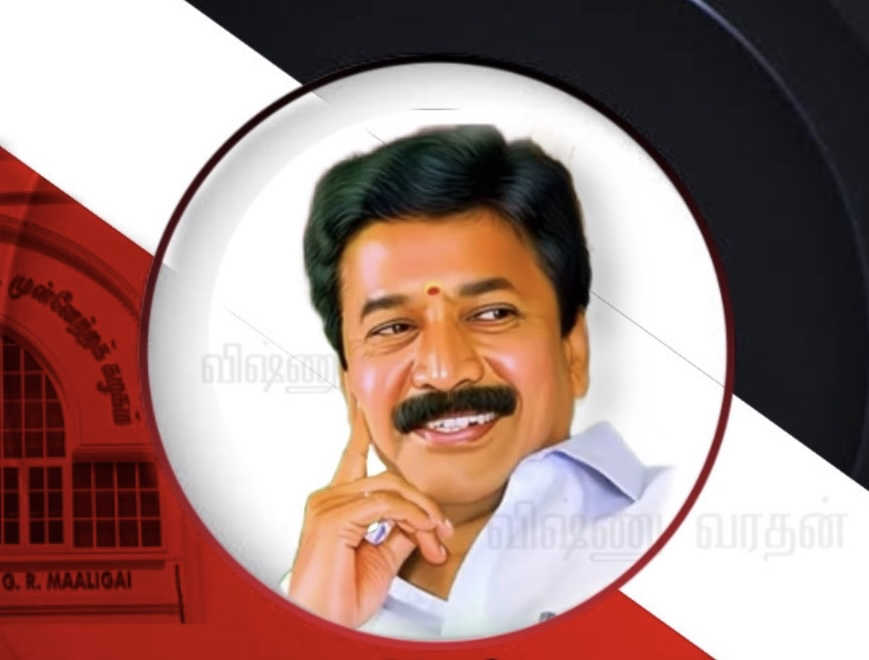

Member of Tamil Nadu Legislative Assembly
- Incumbent
- Assumed office 11 May 2026
- Preceded by: C. Sivakumar
- Constituency: Mailam
- In office 16 May 2011 – 6 May 2021
- Preceded by: K. Ponmudy
- Succeeded by: R. Lakshmanan
- Constituency: Villupuram
- In office 14 May 2001 – 15 May 2011
- Preceded by: R. Sedunathan
- Succeeded by: D. Haridoss
- Constituency: Tindivanam

Member of Parliament, Rajya Sabha
- In office 30 June 2022 – 7 May 2026
- Preceded by: S. R. Balasubramoniyan
- Succeeded by: Praveen Chakravarty
- Constituency: Tamil Nadu

Minister for Law, Courts, Prisons, Mines and Minerals Government of Tamil Nadu
- In office 23 May 2016 – 6 May 2021
- Chief Minister: J. Jayalalithaa; O. Panneerselvam; Edappadi K. Palaniswami
- Preceded by: S. P. Velumani
- Succeeded by: S. Regupathy

Minister for Commercial Taxes and Registration Government of Tamil Nadu
- In office 19 January 2012 – 3 October 2012
- Chief Minister: J. Jayalalithaa
- Preceded by: Agri S. S. Krishnamurthy
- Succeeded by: B. V. Ramanaa

Minister for School Education Government of Tamil Nadu
- In office 16 May 2011 – 18 January 2012
- Chief Minister: J. Jayalalithaa
- Preceded by: Thangam Thennarasu

Personal details
- Born: 1 May 1965 (age 61) Tindivanam, Viluppuram, Tamil Nadu
- Party: All India Anna Dravida Munnetra Kazhagam
- Parent: C. Venugopal (father)

C. Venugopal Shanmugam is an Indian politician from Tamil Nadu. He is currently a Member of Tamil Nadu Legislative Assembly from Mailam. He is a former Rajya Sabha MP from Tamil Nadu. He is a four time MLA and senior Minister from AIADMK party in Tamil Nadu. He was a former member of the Tamil Nadu Legislative Assembly from Villupuram constituency. As a cadre of Anna Dravida Munnetra Kazhagam, he was previously elected to the Tindivanam constituency in 2001 and 2006 elections. He also served as the state's Minister of Education, Law and Commercial Taxes from 2003 to 2006 and from 2011 to 2013 under the leadership of the Chief Minister Jayalalitha. His father was a previous member of the parliament for the Vandavasi constituency.

He is the son of C. Venugopal, who served as 1977 Vandavasi Loksabha MP and The AIADMK organizer for the united South Arcot district. He served as the party district secretary for 10 years. He won the 2016 elections in Villupuram constituency again and was appointed Minister of Law and Prisons. In 2017 he was again made a district secretary of AIADMK for Villupuram district.

He contested again in Viluppuram constituency but he was defeated by 14,868 votes by R. Lakshmanan. He was arrested on 7 April 2022 for protesting against the cancellation of many subsidy schemes in Tamil Nadu. He also insisted that upper house of the Parliament change the name of the Madras High Court to Tamil Nadu High court in the winter session of the Rajya Sabha held on 7 December 2023. In 2026, he contested from Mailam and won by a margin of 30,041 votes.

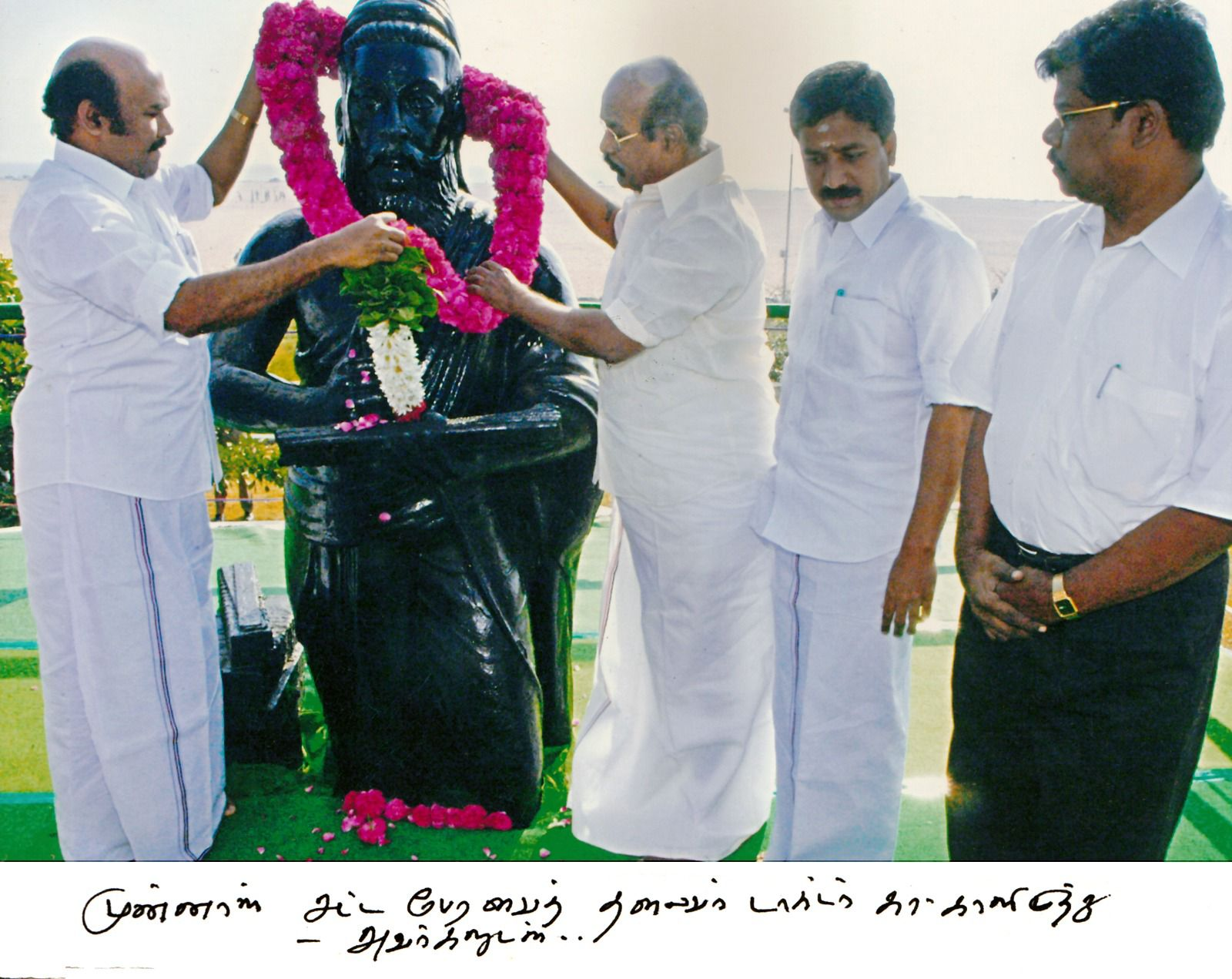
Shanmugam along with his ministerial colleagues

== Electoral history ==
=== Tamil Nadu Legislative Assembly ===
Year	Constituency	Party	Votes	%	Opponent	Opponent Party	Votes	%	Margin	Margin in %	Results
2001	Tindivanam	AIADMK	54,884	53.31	R. Sedunathan	DMK	42,736	41.51	12,148	11.80	Won
2006	Tindivanam	AIADMK	55,856	47.04	M. Karunanithi	PMK	53,648	45.18	2,208	1.86	Won
2011	Villupuram	AIADMK	90,304	52.18	K. Ponmudy	DMK	78,207	45.19	12,097	6.99	Won
2016	Villupuram	AIADMK	69,421	36.74	S. M. Ameer Abbas	IUML	47,130	24.94	22,291	11.80	Won
2021	Villupuram	AIADMK	87,403	42.87	R. Lakshmanan	DMK	102,271	50.16	-14,868	-7.29	Lost
2026	Mailam	AIADMK	82,353	43.52	A. Vijay Niranjan	TVK	52,312	27.65	30,041	15.87	Won
