= K. T. Elayakannu =

Indian politician (born 1965)

Member of the Legislative Assembly (MLA)-Tamil Nadu.
- In office 2001–2006
- Preceded by: V. Perumal
- Succeeded by: C. Tamilselvan
- Constituency: Yercaud

Personal details
- Born: 3 February 1965 Pulithikuttai
- Party: All India Anna Dravida Munnetra Kazhagam
- Profession: Farmer

K. T. Elayakannu is an Indian politician and a former Member of the Legislative Assembly (MLA) of Tamil Nadu. He hails from the Thumba region in the Salem district. A graduate with a bachelor's degree, Elayakannu belongs to the All India Anna Dravida Munnetra Kazhagam (AIADMK) party. He was elected to the Tamil Nadu Legislative Assembly from the Yercaud Assembly constituency in the 2001 state elections.

== Electoral Performance ==
=== 2001 ===
2001 Tamil Nadu Legislative Assembly election: Yercaud
Party	Candidate	Votes	%	±%
AIADMK	K. T. Elayakannu	64,319	64.35%	+30.09
BJP	K. Govindan	30,334	30.35%	+29.23
Independent	R. Vadivel	2,483	2.48%	New
Independent	P. Sampathkumar	856	0.86%	New
JD(U)	C. Dhannalakshmi	847	0.85%	New
Margin of victory		33,985	34.00%	23.12%
Turnout		99,950	61.10%	−2.88%
Registered electors		163,608		
AIADMK gain from DMK		Swing	19.20%	
