= Mailam Assembly constituency =

State Legislative Assembly Constituency in Tamil Nadu

Coordinates: 12.127°N 79.619°E

Mailam
- Constituency No. 71 for the Tamil Nadu Legislative Assembly

Constituency details
- Country: India
- Region: South India
- State: Tamil Nadu
- District: Villupuram
- Lok Sabha constituency: Arani
- Established: 2008
- Total electors: 2,09,098

Member of Legislative Assembly
- 17th Tamil Nadu Legislative Assembly
- Incumbent C. Ve. Shanmugam
- Party: AIADMK
- Alliance: NDA
- Elected year: 2026

Mailam is a state assembly constituency in Tamil Nadu, India, that was formed after constituency delimitations in 2008. Its State Assembly Constituency number is 71. Located in Viluppuram district, it comprises portions of the Gingee and Tindivanam taluks. It is included in Arani Lok Sabha constituency for national elections to the Parliament of India. It is one of the 234 State Legislative Assembly Constituencies in Tamil Nadu in India.

== Members of the Legislative Assembly ==
Year	Member	Party
2011	K. P. Nagarajan	All India Anna Dravida Munnetra Kazhagam
2016	R. Masilamani	Dravida Munnetra Kazhagam
2021	C. Sivakumar	Pattali Makkal Katchi
2026	C. Ve. Shanmugam	All India Anna Dravida Munnetra Kazhagam

== Election results ==
Vote share of winning candidates
2026	43.52%
2021	46.02%
2016	41.40%
2011	53.92%

=== 2026 ===
2026 Tamil Nadu Legislative Assembly election: Mailam
Party	Candidate	Votes	%	±%
AIADMK	C. Ve. Shanmugam	82,353	43.52	New
TVK	A. Vijay Niranjan	52,312	27.65	New
DMDK	L. Venkatesan	46,267	24.45	▲22.22
NTK	Vidjaivikram S	4,383	2.32	▼2.42
NOTA	NOTA	299	0.16	▼0.34
Margin of victory		30,041	15.87	▲14.60
Turnout		1,89,221	90.49	▲10.53
Registered electors		2,09,098		
AIADMK gain from PMK		Swing	▲43.52	

=== 2021 ===
2021 Tamil Nadu Legislative Assembly election: Mailam
Party	Candidate	Votes	%	±%
PMK	C. Sivakumar	81,044	46.02	+31
DMK	Dr. R. Masilamani	78,814	44.75	+3.35
NTK	L. Umamaheswari	8,340	4.74	+4.34
DMDK	A. Sundaresan	3,921	2.23	New
NOTA	NOTA	884	0.50	−0.5
Margin of victory		2,230	1.27	−5.92
Turnout		176,105	79.96	−1.04
Rejected ballots		119	0.07	
Registered electors		220,236		
PMK gain from DMK		Swing	4.62	

=== 2016 ===
2016 Tamil Nadu Legislative Assembly election: Mailam
Party	Candidate	Votes	%	±%
DMK	Dr. R. Masilamani	70,880	41.40	New
AIADMK	K. Annadurai	58,574	34.21	−19.71
PMK	V. R. Rajashekaran	25,711	15.02	−25.64
VCK	S. S. Balaji	10,866	6.35	New
NOTA	NOTA	1,722	1.01	New
Margin of victory		12,306	7.19	−6.07
Turnout		171,211	81.00	−1.47
Registered electors		211,372		
DMK gain from AIADMK		Swing	-12.52	

=== 2011 ===
2011 Tamil Nadu Legislative Assembly election: Mailam
Party	Candidate	Votes	%	±%
AIADMK	K. P. Nagarajan	81,656	53.92	New
PMK	R. Prakash	61,575	40.66	New
BJP	B. Elumalai	1,844	1.22	New
Independent	S. Vinayagamoorthy	1,555	1.03	New
Independent	Vasanthi	1,506	0.99	New
BSP	K. Vijayan	1,191	0.79	New
Independent	S. Nedunchezhiyan	813	0.54	New
Margin of victory		20,081	13.26	
Turnout		183,634	82.47	
Registered electors		151,434		
AIADMK win (new seat)				

== See also ==
- Delimitation Commission of India
