= S. Palaniswamy =

Indian politician

Member of the Tamil Nadu Legislative Assembly
- Incumbent
- Assumed office 11 May 2026
- Preceded by: K. Ponmudy
- Constituency: Tirukkoyilur

Personal details
- Party: All India Anna Dravida Munnetra Kazhagam
- Parent: Subramanian (father)
- Occupation: Politician, Agriculture, Company Director

Subramanian Palaniswamy is an Indian politician who is a Member of the 17th Legislative Assembly of Tamil Nadu. He was elected from Tirukkoyilur as an AIADMK candidate in 2026.

== Elections contested ==
2026 Tamil Nadu Legislative Assembly election: Tirukkoyilur
Party	Candidate	Votes	%	±%
AIADMK	Palanisamy S	73,033	33.61	New
TVK	Vijay R Baranibalaaji	72,748	33.48	New
DMK	Dr. Pon Gautham Sigamani	62,452	28.74	▼28.26
NTK	Hemarajan K	5,791	2.66	▼3.31
Independent	Ramakrishnan M	589	0.27	New
Independent	Vijayamoorthi E	571	0.26	New
NOTA	NOTA	500	0.23	▼0.82
BSP	Govindhakannan M	374	0.17	New
TVK	Tamilselvam R	312	0.14	New
Independent	Ravichandran G	205	0.09	New
Independent	Gowtham S	192	0.09	New
Independent	Edwin Abinesh A	136	0.06	New
Independent	Prabhakaran V J	132	0.06	New
Veerath Thiyagi Viswanathadoss Thozhilalarkal Katchi	Selvam K	108	0.05	New
Independent	Palanisamy E	94	0.04	New
Independent	Karthick S	81	0.04	New
Margin of victory		285	0.13	▼30.52
Turnout		2,17,318	89.28	▲12.71
Registered electors		2,43,404		▼10,909
AIADMK gain from DMK		Swing	▲33.61	
