= Viluppuram Lok Sabha constituency =

Parliamentary constituency in Tamil Nadu, India

Coordinates: 11.94°N 79.49°E

Viluppuram
- Lok Sabha constituency
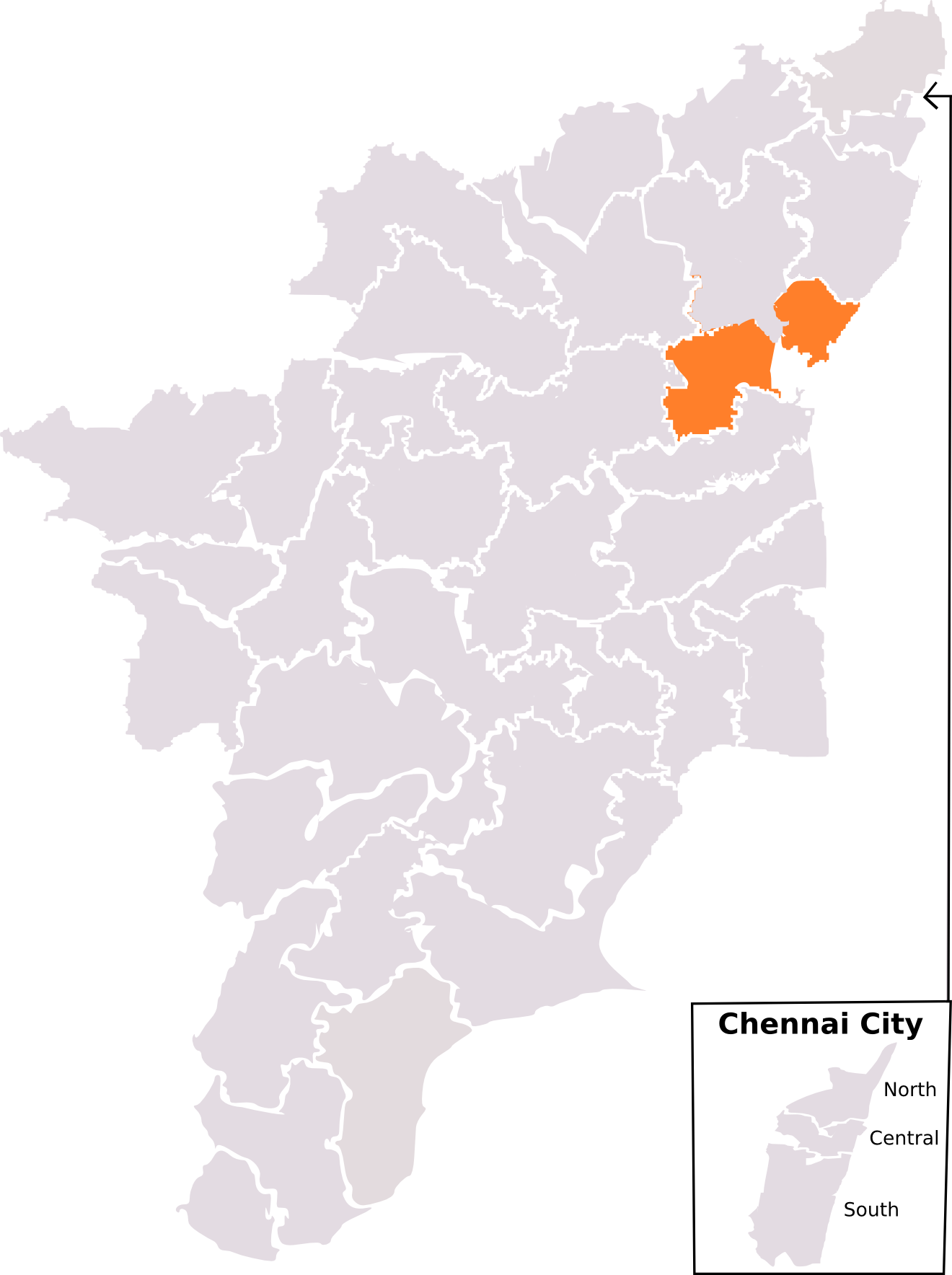
- Area of Viluppuram Lok Sabha Constituency

Constituency details
- Country: India
- Region: South India
- State: Tamil Nadu
- Assembly constituencies: Tindivanam; Vanur; Villupuram; Vikravandi; Tirukkoyilur; Ulundurpettai
- Established: 2009
- Total electors: 1,444,335
- Reservation: SC

Member of Parliament
- 18th Lok Sabha
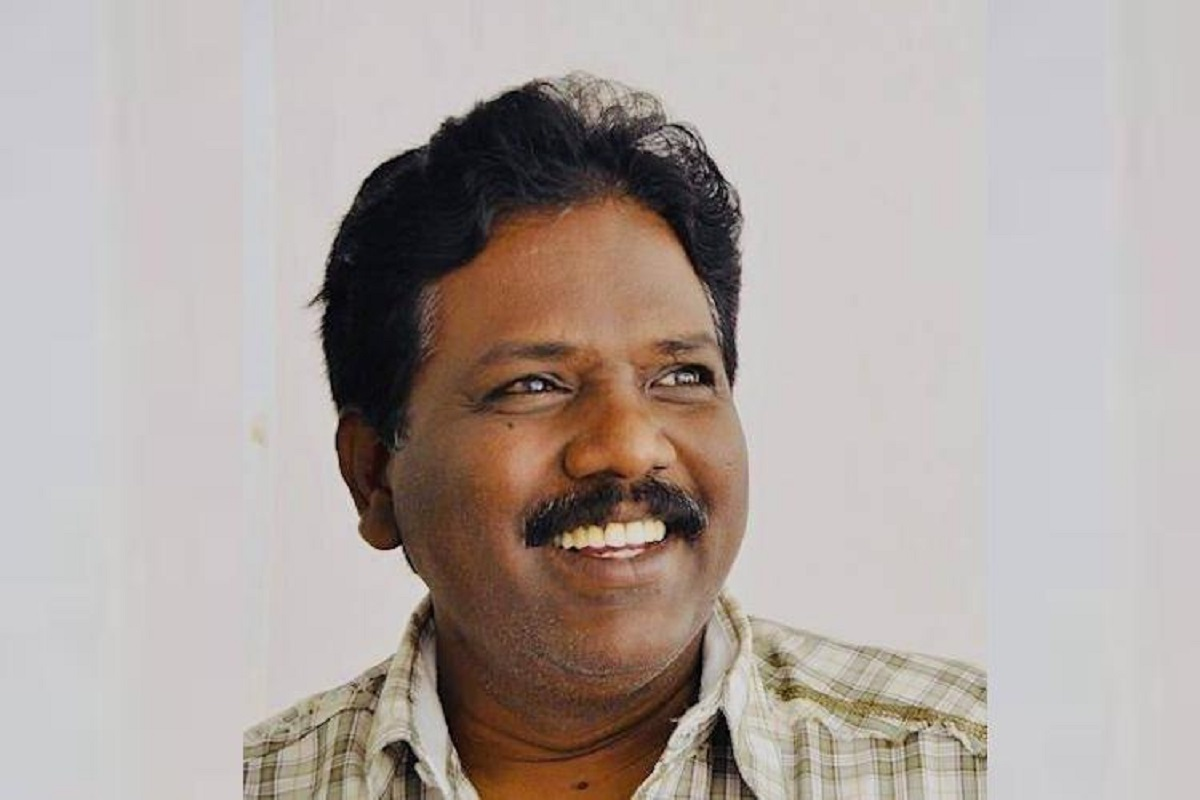
- Incumbent D. Ravikumar
- Party: VCK
- Alliance: INDIA
- Elected year: 2024
- Preceded by: S. Rajendran

Viluppuram Lok Sabha constituency (Tamil: விழுப்புரம் மக்களவைத் தொகுதி) is one of the 39 Lok Sabha (parliamentary) constituencies in Tamil Nadu, a state in southern India.

== Assembly segments ==
Viluppuram Lok Sabha constituency comprises the following legislative assembly segments:

Constituency number	Name	Reserved for (SC/ST/None)	District	Party	2024 Lead
72	Tindivanam	SC	Viluppuram	VCK	VCK
73	Vanur	SC	Viluppuram	DMK	VCK
74	Villupuram	None	Viluppuram	DMK	VCK
75	Vikravandi	None	Viluppuram	PMK	VCK
76	Tirukkoyilur	None	Viluppuram	AIADMK	AIADMK
77	Ulundurpettai	None	Kallakurichi	DMK	AIADMK

== Members of the Parliament ==
Year	Winner	Party
2009	K. Murugesan Anandan	All India Anna Dravida Munnetra Kazhagam
2014	S. Rajendran	All India Anna Dravida Munnetra Kazhagam
2019	D. Ravikumar	Dravida Munnetra Kazhagam
2024	D. Ravikumar	Viduthalai Chiruthaigal Katchi

== Election results ==
Vote share of Winning candidates
2024	41.39%
2019	49.49%
2014	45.70%
2009	38.56%

=== General Elections 2024 ===
2024 Indian general election: Viluppuram
Party	Candidate	Votes	%	±%
VCK	D. Ravikumar	477,033	41.39	
AIADMK	J. Bakkiyaraj	406,330	35.25	
PMK	S.Murali Sankar	181,882	15.78	
NOTA	None of the above	8,966	0.78	▼0.28
Margin of victory		70,703	6.13	▼5.2
Turnout		1,152,667	76.52	
Registered electors		1,503,115		
VCK gain from DMK		Swing		

=== General Elections 2019 ===
2019 Indian general election: Viluppuram
Party	Candidate	Votes	%	±%
DMK	D. Ravikumar	559,585	49.49	22.09
PMK	S. Vadivel Ravanan	4,31,517	38.16	
Independent	N. Ganapathy	58,019	5.13	
MNM	S. Anbin Poyyamozhi	17,891	1.58	
Independent	K. Arasan	12,781	1.13	
NOTA	None of the above	11,943	1.06	−0.03
Margin of victory		1,28,068	11.33	−6.98
Turnout		11,30,799	78.66	2.14
Registered electors		14,44,335		4.13
DMK gain from AIADMK		Swing	3.78	

=== General Elections 2014 ===
2014 Indian general election: Viluppuram
Party	Candidate	Votes	%	±%
AIADMK	S. Rajendran	482,704	45.70	7.14
DMK	Dr. K. Muthaiyan	2,89,337	27.39	
DMDK	K. Umasankar	2,09,663	19.85	3.83
INC	K. Rani	21,461	2.03	
CPI(M)	G. Anandan	17,408	1.65	
NOTA	None of the above	11,440	1.08	
Independent	N. Muthaiyan	4,780	0.45	
Margin of victory		1,93,367	18.31	17.96
Turnout		10,56,201	77.01	1.66
Registered electors		13,87,007		29.85
AIADMK hold		Swing	7.14	

=== General Elections 2009 ===
2009 Indian general election: Viluppuram
Party	Candidate	Votes	%	±%
AIADMK	K. Murugesan Anandan	306,826	38.56	
VCK	K. Swamidurai	3,04,029	38.21	
DMDK	P. M. Ganapathi	1,27,476	16.02	
Independent	M. Kumar	14,770	1.86	
Independent	A. Murugavel	7,522	0.95	
Independent	M. Samidurai	4,773	0.60	
Margin of victory		2,797	0.35	
Turnout		7,95,686	74.56	
Registered electors		10,68,171		
AIADMK win (new seat)				

== See also ==
- Lok Sabha
- Viluppuram district
- Parliament of India
- List of constituencies of the Lok Sabha
