= Anandan =

Anandan is a surname. Notable people with the surname include:

- Anathalavattom Anandan (born 1937), Indian politician
- K. Murugesan Anandan (born 1951), Indian politician
- M. Anandan, Indian politician
- M. S. M. Anandan, Indian politician
- Subhas Anandan (1947–2015), Singaporean lawyer
