= S. Rajendran (AIADMK politician) =

Indian politician (1956–2019)

Member of the India Parliament for Villupuram
- In office 1 September 2014 – 23 February 2019
- Constituency: Villupuram

Personal details
- Born: 1 June 1956 Adhanappattu, Villupuram, Tamil Nadu
- Died: 23 February 2019 (aged 62) Tindivanam
- Cause of death: car crash
- Party: All India Anna Dravida Munnetra Kazhagam
- Spouse: Shanta Rajendran
- Children: 3
- Education: Madras University
- Occupation: Agriculturist
- As of 17 December, 2016

S. Rajendran (1 June 1956 – 23 February 2019) was an Indian politician and Member of Parliament elected from Tamil Nadu. He was elected to the Lok Sabha from Viluppuram constituency as an Anna Dravida Munnetra Kazhagam candidate in 2014 election.

He died in a road accident at Tindivanam in which his driver lost control of his car and crashed into the road median.

Lok Sabha
Preceded by K. Murugesan Anandan	Member of Parliament for Viluppuram; 2014 – 2019	Succeeded by D. Ravikumar
