= Sirumadurai =

Village in Tamil Nadu, India

- Panchayat village
- Location in Tamil Nadu, India Sirumadurai (India)
- Coordinates: 11.8970026°N 79.3580005°E
- Country: India
- State: Tamil Nadu
- District: Villupuram

Languages
  - Official: Tamil
- Time zone: UTC+5:30 (IST)

Sirumadurai is a village located at Thiruvennainallur block of Villupuram district in Tamil Nadu, India. It is a part of Tirukkoyilur state Assembly Constituency.
