= G. Chitra =

Indian politician

Member of the Tamil Nadu Legislative Assembly
- In office 19 May 2016 – 4 May 2026
- Preceded by: C. Perumal
- Succeeded by: P. Usharani
- Constituency: Yercaud

Personal details
- Party: All India Anna Dravida Munnetra Kazhagam

G. Chitra is an Indian politician. She is a member of the All India Anna Dravida Munnetra Kazhagam party. She was elected as a member of Tamil Nadu Legislative Assembly from Yercaud Constituency in May 2021.

== Elections contested ==
Election	Constituency	Party	Result	Vote %	Runner-up	Runner-up Party	Runner-up vote %	Ref.
2021 Tamil Nadu Legislative Assembly election	Yercaud	AIADMK	Won	51.30%	C. Tamilselvan	DMK	40.35%	
2016 Tamil Nadu Legislative Assembly election	Yercaud	AIADMK	Won	45.18%	C. Tamilselvan	DMK	37.37%	
