= Vanni Arasu =

Indian politician (born 1971)

Cabinet Minister Government of Tamil Nadu
- Incumbent
- Assumed office 22 May 2026
- Governor: Rajendra Arlekar
- Chief Minister: C. Joseph Vijay
- Ministry and Departments: Social Justice Department
- Preceded by: M. Mathiventhan

Member of the Tamil Nadu Legislative Assembly
- Incumbent
- Assumed office 4 May 2026
- Preceded by: P. Arjunan
- Constituency: Tindivanam

Personal details
- Born: 1971 (age 54–55) Thiruperunthur, Viluppuram, Tamil Nadu, India
- Party: Viduthalai Chiruthaigal Katchi
- Occupation: Politician

Vanni Arasu (born 1971) is an Indian politician from Tamil Nadu. He is a member of the Tamil Nadu Legislative Assembly from Tindivanam Assembly constituency in Viluppuram district representing Viduthalai Chiruthaigal Katchi which contested the assembly elections in alliance with Dravida Munnetra Kazhagam.

Vanni Arasu (born Jayaraj) is an Indian politician, activist, and author from Tamil Nadu. He currently serves as the Deputy General Secretary of Viduthalai Chiruthaigal Katchi, a political party advocating for the rights of Dalits and other marginalized communities. He is a close associate of Thol. Thirumavalavan and is known for his vocal support for Tamil nationalism and the Eelam Tamil cause.

== Career ==
Vanni Arasu contested in DMK lead SPA alliance and became an MLA for the first time winning the 2026 Tamil Nadu Legislative Assembly election from Tindivanam Assembly constituency in representing Viduthalai Chiruthaigal Katchi. He polled 63,833 votes and defeated his nearest rival, P. Arjunan of the All India Anna Dravida Munnetra Kazhagam, by a margin of 734 votes.

VCK subsequently extended its support to the TVK government to avoid constitutional uncertainty and the possibility of President's Rule. He was appointed as Minister of Social Justice by chief minister C. Joseph Vijay in 2026.

== Controversies ==
On 14 November 2026, Vanni Arasu posted an Instagram reel showing his family visiting a restricted area of the Mudumalai Tiger Reserve in a Forest Department-operated safari vehicle. The video drew criticism from wildlife activists, who alleged that the visit disturbed wild animals, including a black leopard and a wild elephant, in the Bandipur Tiger Reserve. Conservationists questioned the minister's conduct and access to protected areas, called for action under the Wildlife (Protection) Act, and questioned his authority to enter the reserve given that his ministerial portfolio was unrelated to forest administration.

== Electoral Performance ==
=== 2021 ===
2021 Tamil Nadu Legislative Assembly election: Vanur
Party	Candidate	Votes	%	±%
AIADMK	M. Chakrapani	92,219	50.99%	+14.21
VCK	Vanni Arasu	70,492	38.98%	New
NTK	M. Latchoumy	8,587	4.75%	New
DMDK	P. M. Ganapathi	5,460	3.02%	New
MNM	M. Sandoshkumar	2,500	1.38%	New
NOTA	NOTA	1,363	0.75%	−0.07
Margin of victory		21,727	12.01%	6.15%
Turnout		180,845	79.83%	1.00%
Rejected ballots		209	0.12%	
Registered electors		226,539		
AIADMK hold		Swing	14.21%	

=== 2026 ===
2026 Tamil Nadu Legislative Assembly election: Tindivanam
Party	Candidate	Votes	%	±%
VCK	Vanni Arasu	63,833	32.56	New
AIADMK	P. Arjunan	63,099	32.19	−15.96
TVK	S. Sakthivel	61,159	31.02	New
NTK	P. Pechimuthu	5,242	2.67	
NOTA	NOTA	714	0.36	
Margin of victory		734	0.37	
Turnout				
Rejected ballots				
Registered electors		219,256		
VCK gain from AIADMK		Swing		
