= R. Muthamilselvan =

Indian politician

R. Muthamilselvam

MLA of Vikravandi
- In office 24 October 2019 – May 2021
- Preceded by: K. Rathamani
- Succeeded by: N. Pugazhenthi

Personal details
- Born: Kalpattu, Villupuram District
- Party: All India Anna Dravida Munnetra Kazhagam

R. Muthamilselvam is an Indian politician in the All India Anna Dravida Munnetra Kazhagam party. He was elected as a member of the Tamil Nadu Legislative Assembly from Vikravandi on 24 October 2019.
