= K. P. Nagarajan =

Indian politician

K. P. Nagarajan is an Indian politician and incumbent member of the Tamil Nadu Legislative Assembly from the Mailam constituency. He represents the All India Anna Dravida Munnetra Kazhagam party.
