= Labour Progressive Federation =

Political party Labour wing in India

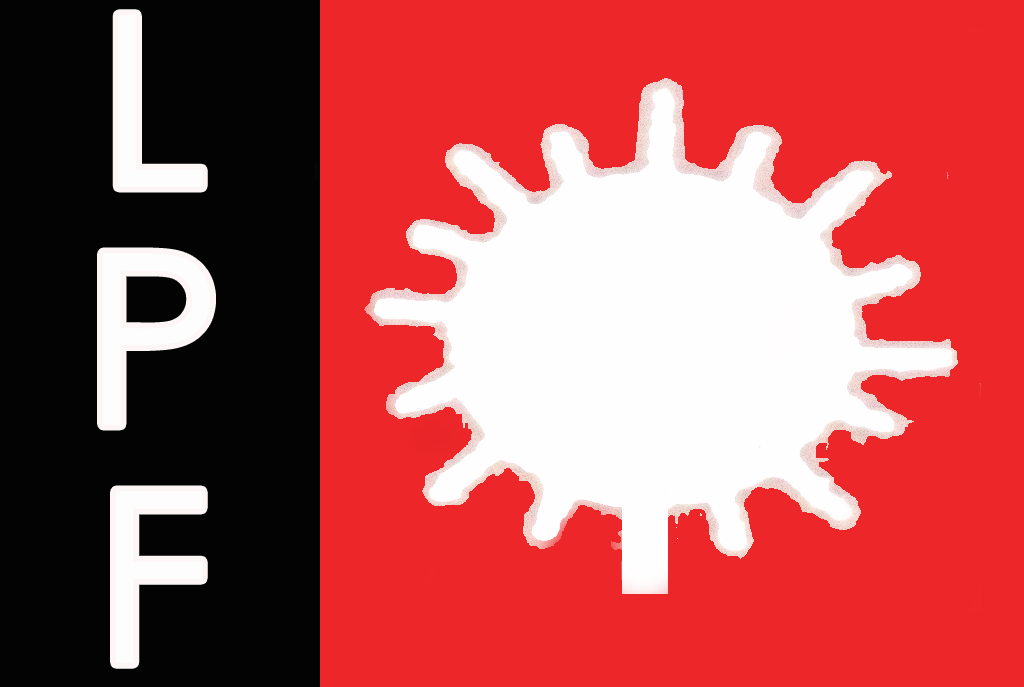
- Abbreviation: LPF
- Leader: M. K. Stalin (convener); Perur A Natarasan (President); M. Shanmugam MP (Secretary-General); K.Natarajan (Treasurer)
- Founder: M. Karunanidhi
- Founded: 1969 (57 years ago)
- Headquarters: Kalaingeragam, T. Nagar, Chennai 600017, Tamil Nadu
- Newspaper: Uzhaippali
- Labour: Labour Progressive Federation (LPF) M. Shanmugam (Secretary-General)
- Membership: ▲611,506 (2002)
- International affiliation: International Labour Organization
- Colours: Red

Party flag

Website
- www.lpf.org.in

The Labour Progressive Federation is a trade union federation in Tamil Nadu, India. The LPF is politically attached to the Tamil Nadu party Dravida Munnetra Kazhagam.

== History ==
According to provisional statistics from the Ministry of Labour, LPF had a membership of 611,506 in 2002.

== Leadership ==
- All India President – Thiru. Perur A. Natarajan, ex-MLA (Expired)
- All India General Secretary – Thiru. Shanmugam
- All India Treasurer – Thiru. K. Natarajan
- All India Labour Progressive Federation Election Commissioner – Thiru. S. Viswanathan
- Election Commissioner – S. Viswanathan

== Affiliates ==
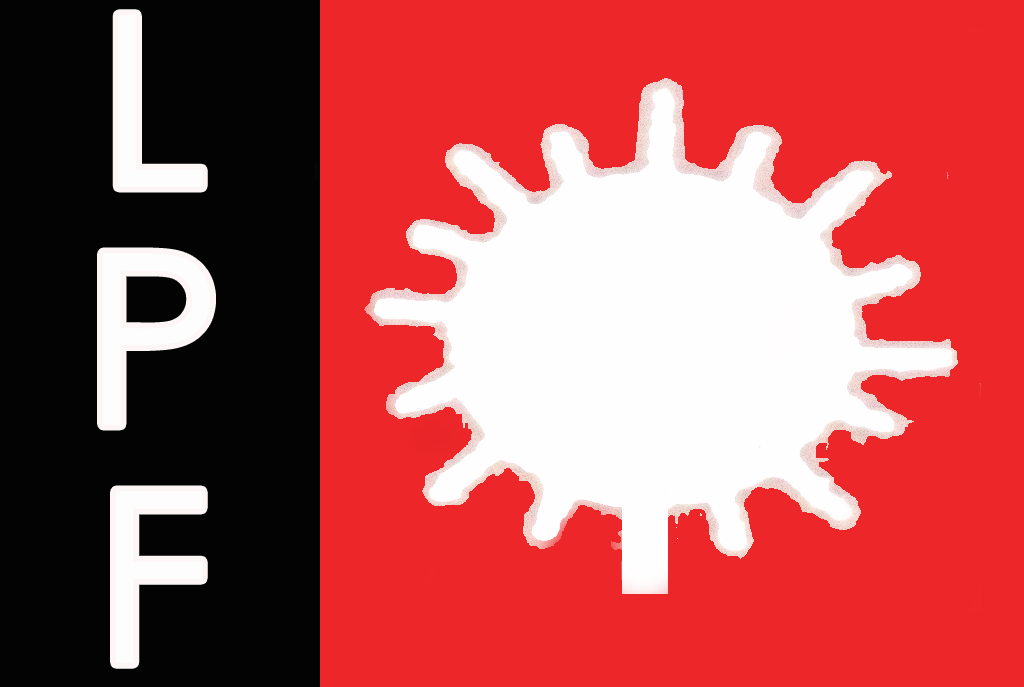
Dmk official LPF Flag

The Workers Progressive Union (WPU) represents NLC workers of India.

It is headed by All India Secretary & General Secretary Thiru. Rajavannian S.

Employees Progressive Union "EPU" represents BHEL workers of India. It is headed by Thiru. P Sathish Kumar No 1 Vice President.

Telecom Employees Progressive Union "TEPU" represents BSNL workers of India. It is headed by V. Subburaman, All India Secretary & General Secretary TEPU.

National Progressive Defence Employees Federation is a joint venture of LPF & TUCC

Thozhilalar Munnetra Sangam, Padaithurai Udaithozhirsalai, is a recognized Union. Thiru. V.Veluswamy is the President and Thiru. A, Mohd Meera is the General Secretary.

All India General Labour Progressive Union represents Un-Organised Sector Labours of India. It is headed by Thiru. T. K. Thamizh Nenjam, All India General Secretary, All India General Labour Progressive Union.
