= P. Arjunan =

Indian politician

Member of the Tamil Nadu Legislative Assembly
- In office 12 May 2021 – 4 May 2026
- Preceded by: P. Seethapathy
- Succeeded by: Vanni Arasu
- Constituency: Tindivanam

Personal details
- Born: 1 May 1969 (age 57) Tindivanam, Tamil Nadu, India
- Party: All India Anna Dravida Munnetra Kazhagam
- Parent: Ponnusami (father)
- Occupation: Politician

Ponnusami Arjunan is an Indian politician. He is a member of the All India Anna Dravida Munnetra Kazhagam party. He was elected as a member of Tamil Nadu Legislative Assembly from Tindivanam Constituency in May 2021.

== Electoral performance ==
2021 Tamil Nadu Legislative Assembly election: Tindivanam
Party	Candidate	Votes	%	±%
AIADMK	P. Arjunan	87,152	48.15	+12.87
DMK	P. Seethapathy	77,399	42.76	+7.43
NTK	P. Pachimuthu	9,203	5.08	+4.57
DMDK	K. Chandralekha	2,701	1.49	−7.03
MNM	Poyathu @ Anbin S. Poyyamozhi	2,079	1.15	New
NOTA	NOTA	1,523	0.84	−0.36
Margin of victory		9,753	5.39	5.33
Turnout		181,015	78.52	−0.42
Rejected ballots		142	0.08	
Registered electors		230,527		
AIADMK gain from DMK		Swing	12.82	
