= T. D. Muthukumaraswamy Naidu =

Indian politician

T. D. Muthukumaraswamy Naidu was an Indian politician and former Member of Parliament elected from Tamil Nadu. He was elected to the Lok Sabha from Cuddalore constituency as an Independent candidate in 1957 election.

He also served as a Member of the Legislative Assembly of Tamil Nadu. He was elected to the Tamil Nadu legislative assembly as a Tamil Nadu Toilers Party candidate from Tirukkoyilur constituency in 1952 election.
