= D. Janardhanan =

Indian politician (1946–2022)

Tamil Nadu Minister of Milk and Dairy Development and Animal Husbandry
- In office 1993–1996
- Chief Minister: J. Jayalalithaa

Member of the Tamil Nadu Legislative Council
- In office 1991–1996
- Preceded by: K. Ponmudy
- Succeeded by: K. Ponmudy
- Constituency: Villupuram

Personal details
- Born: 11 August 1946 India
- Died: 14 September 2022 (aged 76)
- Party: All India Anna Dravida Munnetra Kazhagam

D. Janardhanan was an Indian politician of the All India Anna Dravida Munnetra Kazhagam and Member of the Legislative Assembly of Tamil Nadu. He served as the Minister of Milk and Dairy Development and Animal Husbandry in the Tamil Nadu government during 1993–1996. He died on 14 September 2022.
