= K. M. Thangamani Gounder =

Indian politician

K. M. Thangamani Gounder was an Indian politician and former Member of the Legislative Assembly of Tamil Nadu. He was elected to the Tamil Nadu legislative assembly from Tindivanam constituency as an Indian National Congress (Indira) candidate in the 1980 election and as an Anna Dravida Munnetra Kazhagam candidate in the 1984 election.
