= M. Jagannathan =

Indian politician

Member of the Madras State Assembly
- In office 1952 - 1957
- Preceded by: Venugopala Gounder
- Constituency: Tindivanam
- In office 1957 - 1962

Personal details
- Political party: Tamil Nadu Toilers' Party

M. Jagannathan was an Indian politician and former Member of the Legislative Assembly of Tamil Nadu. He was elected to the Tamil Nadu legislative assembly from Tindivanam constituency as a Tamil Nadu Toilers Party candidate in 1952 election and as an Independent candidate in 1957 election.
