= E. M. Subramaniam (MLA) =

Member of the Legislative Assembly-Tamil Nadu
- In office 1967–1971
- Preceded by: Lakshiminarasimma Ammal
- Succeeded by: A. S. Kumarasamy
- Constituency: Tirukkoyilur

Personal details
- Born: 20 June 1932
- Died: 10 July 2016
- Party: Indian National Congress
- Profession: Agriculturist

E. M. Subramaniam is an Indian politician and a former Member of the Legislative Assembly (MLA) of Tamil Nadu. He hails from Eruvelipettai village in the Villupuram district. He received his school education at Madurantakam Hindu High School and subsequently completed his college education at Pachaiyappa's College, Chennai. A member of the Indian National Congress party, he contested and won the election to the Tamil Nadu Legislative Assembly from the Tirukkoyilur constituency in 1967, thereby becoming an MLA.

== Electoral performance ==
=== 1967 ===
1967 Madras Legislative Assembly election: Tirukkoyilur
Party	Candidate	Votes	%	±%
INC	E. M. Subramaniam	34,259	51.25%	−0.01
DMK	A. S. Kumarasamy	32,586	48.75%	+21.82
Margin of victory		1,673	2.50%	−21.82%
Turnout		66,845	81.47%	17.54%
Registered electors		85,190		
INC hold		Swing	-0.01%	
