= A. Thangavelu =

Indian politician

Members of Legislative Assembly, Tamil Nadu
- In office 1962–1967
- Constituency: Tindivanam

Personal details
- Born: 6 April 1917
- Party: Dravida Munnetra Kazhagam
- Profession: Farmer

A. Thangavelu was an Indian politician and former member of Tamil Nadu Assembly. He was a member of Dravida Munnetra Kazhagam (DMK) and served as the MLA of Tindivanam Assembly constituency from 1962 to 1967.

== Personal life ==
Thangavelu was born on 6th April 1917 at Kaveripakkam of Ranipettai District in Tamil Nadu. He has completed special teacher training at Chidambaram, Annamalai University.

== Electoral performance ==
1962 Madras Legislative Assembly election: Tindivanam
Party	Candidate	Votes	%	±%
DMK	Thangavelu A.	27,687	45.33	New
INC	Veerappa Kounder P.	27,422	44.90	+24.23
CPI	R. Murugesan	4,927	8.07	New
Independent	M. Krishnan	1,044	1.71	New
Margin of victory		265	0.43	−1.51
Turnout		61,080	71.79	−17.44
Registered electors		88,723		
DMK gain from Independent		Swing	18.33	
