= R. Ramamurthy =

Indian politician

R. Ramamurthy is an Indian politician.

A member of the Communist Party of India (Marxist), Ramamurthy served on the Tamil Nadu Legislative Assembly from the Vikravandi constituency between 2011 and 2016, when he was succeeded by K. Rathamani.
