= C. Sivakumar =

Indian politician

Member of Tamil Nadu Legislative Assembly
- Incumbent
- Assumed office 11 May 2026
- Preceded by: Anniyur Siva
- Constituency: Vikravandi
- In office 12 May 2021 – 11 May 2026
- Preceded by: Dr. R. Masilamani
- Succeeded by: C. Ve. Shanmugam
- Constituency: Mailam

Personal details
- Born: 1974 (age 51–52) Viluppuram, Tamil Nadu, India
- Party: Pattali Makkal Katchi
- Parent: Chakkaravarthi (father)
- Occupation: Politician, Agricultural Services

Chakkaravarthi Sivakumar is an Indian politician who is a Member of Legislative Assembly of Tamil Nadu. He was elected from Mailam as a Pattali Makkal Katchi candidate in 2021. In 2025, Sivakumar declared support for PMK President Anbumani Ramadoss, which resulted in him being censured by party founder S. Ramadoss, and, along with 2 other PMK MLAs, later joined the faction of the PMK led by Anbumani. In 2026, he contested from Vikravandi and won by a margin of 910 votes.

== Elections contested ==
Election	Constituency	Party	Result	Vote %	Runner-up	Runner-up Party	Runner-up vote %
2021 Tamil Nadu Legislative Assembly election	Mailam	PMK	Won	46.02%	Dr. R. Masilamani	DMK	44.75%
