= Tirukkoyilur Assembly constituency =

State Legislative Assembly Constituency in Tamil Nadu

Coordinates: 11.97°N 79.21°E

Tirukkoyilur
- Constituency No. 76 for the Tamil Nadu Legislative Assembly

Constituency details
- Country: India
- Region: South India
- State: Tamil Nadu
- District: Villupuram
- Lok Sabha constituency: Villupuram
- Established: 1951
- Total electors: 2,43,404

Member of Legislative Assembly
- 17th Tamil Nadu Legislative Assembly
- Incumbent S. Palaniswamy
- Party: AIADMK
- Alliance: NDA
- Elected year: 2026

Tirukkoyilur is a state assembly constituency of Viluppuram district in Tamil Nadu, India. Its State Assembly Constituency number is 76. It comprises a portion of Tirukkoyilur taluk and is a part of Viluppuram Lok Sabha constituency for national elections to the Parliament of India. It is one of the 234 State Legislative Assembly Constituencies in Tamil Nadu.

Thiru. A. Muthuswamy was the first MLA of Thirukovilur Town, from 1952–1957. It was in existence from 1951 to the 1971 state elections. After the delimitation of constituencies in 2008, Mughaiyur Assembly constituency and Rishivandhiyam Assembly constituency were reorganised into Tirukovilur Assembly constituency. It had 1,94,414 registered voters for the 2011 election.

== Demographics ==
Demographics (2011)
Category	Data
Created	2016
Vanniyar	40%
Sengunthar Kaikola Mudaliyar	05%
Adi Dravida	30%
Nathama Udayar	05%
Konar, Nayudu, Pillaimar	08%
Others	12%
Total Electorate	2,50,669

== Members of Legislative Assembly ==
=== Madras State ===
Year	Winner	Party
1952	A. Muthuswamy	Tamil Nadu Toilers' Party
1957	S. A. M. Annamalai Odayar and Kuppusami	Independent and Indian National Congress
1962	Lakshminarasimma Ammal	Indian National Congress
1967	E. M. Subramaniam	Indian National Congress

=== Tamil Nadu ===
Year	Winner	Party
1971	A. S. Kumarasamy	Dravida Munnetra Kazhagam

Tirukkoyilur was again formed after constituency delimitations in 2008.

Year	Winner	Party
2011	L. Venkatesan	Desiya Murpokku Dravida Kazhagam
2016	K. Ponmudy	Dravida Munnetra Kazhagam
2021	K. Ponmudy	Dravida Munnetra Kazhagam
2026	S. Palaniswamy	All India Anna Dravida Munnetra Kazhagam

== Election results ==
Vote share of winning candidates
2026	33.61%
2021	57.00%
2016	49.80%
2011	49.18%
1971	55.27%
1967	51.25%
1962	51.26%
1957	24.27%
1952	28.99%

=== 2026 ===
2026 Tamil Nadu Legislative Assembly election: Tirukkoyilur
Party	Candidate	Votes	%	±%
AIADMK	Palanisamy S	73,033	33.61	New
TVK	Vijay R Baranibalaaji	72,748	33.48	New
DMK	Dr. Pon Gautham Sigamani	62,452	28.74	▼28.26
NTK	Hemarajan K	5,791	2.66	▼3.31
Margin of victory		285	0.13	▼30.52
Turnout		2,17,318	89.28	▲12.71
Registered electors		2,43,404		▼10,909
AIADMK gain from DMK		Swing	▲33.61	

=== 2021 ===
2021 Tamil Nadu Legislative Assembly election: Tirukkoyilur
Party	Candidate	Votes	%	±%
DMK	K. Ponmudy	110,980	57.00%	+7.2
BJP	Vat. Kalivaradhan	51,300	26.35%	+25.72
DMDK	L. Venkatesan	13,997	7.19%	New
NTK	S. Murugan	11,620	5.97%	New
NOTA	NOTA	2,039	1.05%	−0.07
Independent	M. Vignesh	1,482	0.76%	New
IJK	M. Senthilkumar	1,066	0.55%	New
Margin of victory		59,680	30.65%	8.86%
Turnout		194,718	76.57%	−2.25%
Rejected ballots		155	0.08%	
Registered electors		254,313		
DMK hold		Swing	7.20%	

=== 2016 ===
2016 Tamil Nadu Legislative Assembly election: Tirukkoyilur
Party	Candidate	Votes	%	±%
DMK	K. Ponmudy	93,837	49.80%	+6.15
AIADMK	G. Gothandaraman	52,780	28.01%	New
PMK	Balasakthi	18,822	9.99%	New
TMC(M)	G. Ganesh	15,045	7.98%	New
NOTA	NOTA	2,110	1.12%	New
Independent	Rajesh	1,473	0.78%	New
BJP	S. Dhandapani	1,178	0.63%	New
Margin of victory		41,057	21.79%	16.26%
Turnout		188,438	78.82%	−1.69%
Registered electors		239,087		
DMK gain from DMDK		Swing	0.62%	

=== 2011 ===
2011 Tamil Nadu Legislative Assembly election: Tirukkoyilur
Party	Candidate	Votes	%	±%
DMDK	L. Venkatesan	78,229	49.18%	New
DMK	M. Thangam	69,438	43.65%	New
Independent	V. Venkatesan	6,029	3.79%	New
IJK	S. S. Venkatesan	3,280	2.06%	New
BSP	C. Periyasamy	1,271	0.80%	New
Independent	R. Santhi	828	0.52%	New
Margin of victory		8,791	5.53%	
Turnout		159,075	80.50%	
Registered electors		197,599		
DMDK win (new seat)				

=== 1971 ===
1971 Tamil Nadu Legislative Assembly election: Tirukkoyilur
Party	Candidate	Votes	%	±%
DMK	A. S. Kumarasamy	38,520	55.27%	+6.52
INC	A. Vadivel	31,171	44.73%	−6.52
Margin of victory		7,349	10.55%	8.04%
Turnout		69,691	78.91%	−2.56%
Registered electors		92,628		
DMK gain from INC		Swing	4.02%	

=== 1967 ===
1967 Madras Legislative Assembly election: Tirukkoyilur
Party	Candidate	Votes	%	±%
INC	E. M. Subramaniam	34,259	51.25%	−0.01
DMK	A. S. Kumarasamy	32,586	48.75%	+21.82
Margin of victory		1,673	2.50%	−21.82%
Turnout		66,845	81.47%	17.54%
Registered electors		85,190		
INC hold		Swing	-0.01%	

=== 1962 ===
1962 Madras Legislative Assembly election: Tirukkoyilur
Party	Candidate	Votes	%	±%
INC	Lakshiminarasimma Ammal	27,954	51.26%	+29.62
DMK	Balasubramaniam	14,687	26.93%	New
SWA	Mohanadoss	8,465	15.52%	New
CPI	Venugopal	3,430	6.29%	New
Margin of victory		13,267	24.33%	21.69%
Turnout		54,536	63.93%	−34.42%
Registered electors		90,641		
INC gain from Independent		Swing	26.98%	

=== 1957 ===
1957 Madras Legislative Assembly election: Tirukkoyilur
Party	Candidate	Votes	%	±%
Independent	S. A. M. Annamalai Odayar	41,980	24.27%	New
INC	Lakshmi Narasamma	37,422	21.64%	+1.11
INC	Kuppusami (Sc)	35,916	20.77%	+0.24
Independent	Muthusami (Sc)	31,036	17.95%	New
Independent	Kadirvelu Koundar	15,179	8.78%	New
Independent	Ramasami	11,406	6.60%	New
Margin of victory		4,558	2.64%	−0.04%
Turnout		172,939	98.35%	−10.74%
Registered electors		175,837		
Independent gain from TTP		Swing	-4.72%	

=== 1952 ===
1952 Madras Legislative Assembly election: Tirukkoyilur
Party	Candidate	Votes	%	±%
TTP	T. D. Muthukumaraswamy Naidu	38,928	28.99%	New
TTP	A. Muthuswami	35,334	26.32%	New
INC	Kulasekhara Dass	27,567	20.53%	New
INC	M. Rajagopal	23,206	17.28%	New
Independent	D. Dayalu Reddair	5,964	4.44%	New
Socialist Party (India)	N. Ramalingam	3,265	2.43%	New
Margin of victory		3,594	2.68%	
Turnout		134,264	109.09%	
Registered electors		123,072		
TTP win (new seat)				
