= Tindivanam Assembly constituency =

State Legislative Assembly Constituency in Tamil Nadu

Coordinates: 12.23°N 79.65°E

Tindivanam
- Constituency No. 72 for the Tamil Nadu Legislative Assembly

Constituency details
- Country: India
- Region: South India
- State: Tamil Nadu
- District: Viluppuram
- Lok Sabha constituency: Viluppuram
- Established: 1951
- Total electors: 2,19,300
- Reservation: SC

Member of Legislative Assembly
- 17th Tamil Nadu Legislative Assembly
- Incumbent Vanni Arasu
- Party: VCK
- Alliance: TVK+
- Elected year: 2026

Tindivanam is a state assembly constituency in Viluppuram district of Tamil Nadu, India. Its State Assembly Constituency number is 72. The seat is reserved for candidates from the Scheduled Castes. It comprises a portion of Tindivanam taluk and is a part of Viluppuram Lok Sabha constituency for national elections to the Parliament of India. It is one of the 234 State Legislative Assembly Constituencies in Tamil Nadu, in India.

== Members of Legislative Assembly ==
Year	Member	Political party
Madras State
1952	Venugopala Gounder	Tamil Nadu Toilers' Party
1952	M. Jagannathan	Tamil Nadu Toilers' Party
1957	P. Veerappa Gounder	Independent
1957	M. Jagannathan	Independent
1962	A. Thangavelu	Dravida Munnetra Kazhagam
1967	K. Ramamoorthy	Indian National Congress
Tamil Nadu
1971	G. Rajaram	Dravida Munnetra Kazhagam
1977	T. R. Rajaram Reddy	Indian National Congress
1980	K. M. Thangamani Gounder	Indian National Congress (I)
1984	K. M. Thangamani Gounder	All India Anna Dravida Munnetra Kazhagam
1989	R. Masilamani	Dravida Munnetra Kazhagam
1991	S. Pannirselvam	Indian National Congress
1996	R. Sedunathan	Dravida Munnetra Kazhagam
2001	C. V. Shanmugam	All India Anna Dravida Munnetra Kazhagam
2006	C. V. Shanmugam	All India Anna Dravida Munnetra Kazhagam
2011	D. Haridoss	All India Anna Dravida Munnetra Kazhagam
2016	P. Seethapathy	Dravida Munnetra Kazhagam
2021	P. Arjunan	All India Anna Dravida Munnetra Kazhagam
2026	Vanni Arasu	Viduthalai Chiruthaigal Katchi

== Election results ==
Vote share of winning candidates
2026	32.56%
2021	48.15%
2016	35.33%
2011	52.59%
2006	47.04%
2001	53.31%
1996	45.40%
1991	50.58%
1989	48.05%
1984	58.67%
1980	42.33%
1977	29.55%
1971	55.83%
1967	51.59%
1962	45.33%
1957	27.00%
1952	29.09%

=== 2026 ===
2026 Tamil Nadu Legislative Assembly election: Tindivanam
Party	Candidate	Votes	%	±%
VCK	Vanni Arasu	63,833	32.56	New
AIADMK	P. Arjunan	63,099	32.19	▼15.96
TVK	S. Sakthivel	61,159	31.20	New
NTK	P. Pachimuthu	5,242	2.67	▼2.41
NOTA	NOTA	714	0.36	▼0.48
Margin of victory		734	0.37	▼5.02
Turnout		1,96,026	89.39	▲10.87
Registered electors		2,19,300		▼11,227
VCK gain from AIADMK		Swing	▲32.56	

=== 2021 ===
2021 Tamil Nadu Legislative Assembly election: Tindivanam
Party	Candidate	Votes	%	±%
AIADMK	P. Arjunan	87,152	48.15	+12.87
DMK	P. Seethapathy	77,399	42.76	+7.43
NTK	P. Pachimuthu	9,203	5.08	+4.57
DMDK	K. Chandralekha	2,701	1.49	−7.03
MNM	Poyathu @ Anbin S. Poyyamozhi	2,079	1.15	New
NOTA	NOTA	1,523	0.84	−0.36
Margin of victory		9,753	5.39	5.33
Turnout		181,015	78.52	−0.42
Rejected ballots		142	0.08	
Registered electors		230,527		
AIADMK gain from DMK		Swing	12.82	

=== 2016 ===
2016 Tamil Nadu Legislative Assembly election: Tindivanam
Party	Candidate	Votes	%	±%
DMK	P. Seethapathy	61,879	35.33	New
AIADMK	S. P. Rajendran	61,778	35.27	−17.32
PMK	A. Kalidoss	29,848	17.04	−25.41
DMDK	M. Udhayakumar	14,928	8.52	New
NOTA	NOTA	2,112	1.21	New
BJP	B. Poovazhagi	1,509	0.86	+0.2
NTK	G. Bhuvaneshwari	908	0.52	New
Margin of victory		101	0.06	−10.09
Turnout		175,150	78.94	−2.33
Registered electors		221,864		
DMK gain from AIADMK		Swing	-17.26	

=== 2011 ===
2011 Tamil Nadu Legislative Assembly election: Tindivanam
Party	Candidate	Votes	%	±%
AIADMK	D. Haridoss	80,553	52.59	+5.55
PMK	M. P. Sankar	65,016	42.45	−2.74
Independent	M. Munusamy	2,071	1.35	New
IJK	R. Radhika	1,125	0.73	New
BJP	M. Venugopal	1,010	0.66	+0.09
Margin of victory		15,537	10.14	8.28
Turnout		153,169	81.27	3.94
Registered electors		188,461		
AIADMK hold		Swing	5.55	

=== 2006 ===
2006 Tamil Nadu Legislative Assembly election: Tindivanam
Party	Candidate	Votes	%	±%
AIADMK	C. V. Shanmugam	55,856	47.04	−6.27
PMK	M. Karunanithi	53,648	45.18	New
DMDK	K. Lakshmanan	4,364	3.68	New
Independent	K. Manickam	2,102	1.77	New
Independent	S. Thanasekaran	827	0.70	New
BJP	I. M. Sekar Nayakar	674	0.57	New
Margin of victory		2,208	1.86	−9.94
Turnout		118,735	77.34	14.63
Registered electors		153,528		
AIADMK hold		Swing	-6.27	

=== 2001 ===
2001 Tamil Nadu Legislative Assembly election: Tindivanam
Party	Candidate	Votes	%	±%
AIADMK	C. V. Shanmugam	54,884	53.31	New
DMK	R. Sedunathan	42,736	41.51	−3.89
MDMK	S. Ravi	2,353	2.29	−14.15
Independent	M. Megesh	2,182	2.12	New
Independent	G. Iniyadayalan	801	0.78	New
Margin of victory		12,148	11.80	−13.55
Turnout		102,956	62.71	−5.93
Registered electors		164,200		
AIADMK gain from DMK		Swing	7.91	

=== 1996 ===
1996 Tamil Nadu Legislative Assembly election: Tindivanam
Party	Candidate	Votes	%	±%
DMK	R. Sedunathan	45,448	45.40	+14.75
PMK	M. Karunanithi	20,068	20.05	New
MDMK	R. Masilamani	16,449	16.43	New
INC	D. Rajaram	16,018	16.00	−34.58
BJP	S. Moorthy	523	0.52	New
Margin of victory		25,380	25.35	5.43
Turnout		100,106	68.64	0.79
Registered electors		153,450		
DMK gain from INC		Swing	-5.18	

=== 1991 ===
1991 Tamil Nadu Legislative Assembly election: Tindivanam
Party	Candidate	Votes	%	±%
INC	S. Pannirselvam	48,317	50.58	+15.61
DMK	R. Masilamani	29,282	30.65	−17.4
PMK	M. Karuranidhi	16,580	17.36	New
BSP	K. Sadaian	577	0.60	New
Margin of victory		19,035	19.93	6.84
Turnout		95,532	67.85	3.41
Registered electors		145,939		
INC gain from DMK		Swing	2.52	

=== 1989 ===
1989 Tamil Nadu Legislative Assembly election: Tindivanam
Party	Candidate	Votes	%	±%
DMK	R. Masilamani	39,504	48.05	New
INC	Tindivanam K. Ramamurthy	28,749	34.97	−23.7
AIADMK	G. R. Ravindhran	6,258	7.61	New
AIADMK	K. M. Thangamani	4,478	5.45	New
Independent	S. Gandhidass	941	1.14	New
Independent	T. R. Maheswaran	525	0.64	New
Margin of victory		10,755	13.08	−11.88
Turnout		82,210	64.44	−7.11
Registered electors		129,844		
DMK gain from INC		Swing	-10.61	

=== 1984 ===
1984 Tamil Nadu Legislative Assembly election: Tindivanam
Party	Candidate	Votes	%	±%
INC	K. M. Thangamani Gounder	45,404	58.67	+16.33
JP	Subramanya Kounder	26,088	33.71	New
Independent	S. Krishnan	3,596	4.65	New
Independent	K. Semmaneri Gounder K.	2,306	2.98	New
Margin of victory		19,316	24.96	17.17
Turnout		77,394	71.55	5.39
Registered electors		113,711		
INC hold		Swing	16.33	

=== 1980 ===
1980 Tamil Nadu Legislative Assembly election: Tindivanam
Party	Candidate	Votes	%	±%
INC	K. M. Thangamani Gounder	29,778	42.33	+12.78
AIADMK	Erajaram Reddy	24,302	34.55	+11.02
JP	Radhakrishnan	15,953	22.68	New
Margin of victory		5,476	7.78	4.92
Turnout		70,343	66.16	2.06
Registered electors		107,921		
INC hold		Swing	12.78	

=== 1977 ===
1977 Tamil Nadu Legislative Assembly election: Tindivanam
Party	Candidate	Votes	%	±%
INC	T. R. Erajaram Reddy	18,990	29.55	−6.72
JP	R. Radhakrishnan	17,150	26.69	New
AIADMK	G. Rajaram	15,117	23.52	New
DMK	G. Venkatraman	11,958	18.61	−37.22
Independent	P. M. Ranganathan	1,046	1.63	New
Margin of victory		1,840	2.86	−16.69
Turnout		64,261	64.10	−8.77
Registered electors		101,610		
INC gain from DMK		Swing	-26.27	

=== 1971 ===
1971 Tamil Nadu Legislative Assembly election: Tindivanam
Party	Candidate	Votes	%	±%
DMK	G. Rajaram	33,933	55.83	+7.41
INC	K. Ramamurthy	22,048	36.27	−15.31
Independent	C. Renganathan	3,960	6.51	New
Independent	M. R. Reddy	843	1.39	New
Margin of victory		11,885	19.55	16.38
Turnout		60,784	72.87	−3.53
Registered electors		95,171		
DMK gain from INC		Swing	4.24	

=== 1967 ===
1967 Madras Legislative Assembly election: Tindivanam
Party	Candidate	Votes	%	±%
INC	K. Ramamoorthy	34,106	51.59	+6.69
DMK	A. Thangavelu	32,008	48.41	+3.08
Margin of victory		2,098	3.17	2.74
Turnout		66,114	76.39	4.61
Registered electors		89,697		
INC gain from DMK		Swing	6.26	

=== 1962 ===
1962 Madras Legislative Assembly election: Tindivanam
Party	Candidate	Votes	%	±%
DMK	Thangavelu A.	27,687	45.33	New
INC	Veerappa Kounder P.	27,422	44.90	+24.23
CPI	R. Murugesan	4,927	8.07	New
Independent	M. Krishnan	1,044	1.71	New
Margin of victory		265	0.43	−1.51
Turnout		61,080	71.79	−17.44
Registered electors		88,723		
DMK gain from Independent		Swing	18.33	

=== 1957 ===
1957 Madras Legislative Assembly election: Tindivanam
Party	Candidate	Votes	%	±%
Independent	P. Veerappa Goundar	37,448	27.00	
Independent	M. Jagannathan	34,753	25.06	
INC	Venugopal Koundar	28,658	20.66	0.32
INC	Pichaikuppan (Sc)	22,941	16.54	−3.80
Independent	Kannan (Sc)	5,563	4.01	
Independent	Thiruneelakantar	4,730	3.41	
Independent	S. Arumugha Mudaliar	4,586	3.31	
Margin of victory		2,695	1.94	−2.70
Turnout		1,38,679	89.23	−14.55
Registered electors		1,55,419		
Independent gain from TTP		Swing	-2.09	

=== 1952 ===
1952 Madras Legislative Assembly election: Tindivanam
Party	Candidate	Votes	%	±%
TTP	M. Jagannathan	48,783	29.09	
TTP	Venugopala Gounder	40,998	24.45	
INC	Balasundaram	34,119	20.35	20.35
INC	Venkatakrishna Reddiar	33,414	19.92	19.92
Independent	Ganapathi	10,385	6.19	
Margin of victory		7,785	4.64	
Turnout		1,67,699	103.78	
Registered electors		1,61,593		
TTP win (new seat)				
