= P. Usharani =

Indian politician

Member of the Tamil Nadu Legislative Assembly
- Incumbent
- Assumed office 11 May 2026
- Preceded by: G. Chitra
- Constituency: Yercaud

Personal details
- Party: All India Anna Dravida Munnetra Kazhagam

P. Usharani (born 1972) is an Indian politician from Tamil Nadu. She is a Member of the Legislative Assembly from Yercaud Assembly constituency in Salem district representing the AIADMK.

She became an MLA for the first time winning the 2026 Tamil Nadu Legislative Assembly election from Yercaud Assembly constituency representing the All India Anna Dravida Munnetra Kazhagam. She polled 87,772 votes and defeated her nearest rival, Lakshmi Janarthanan. J. of the Tamilaga Vettri Kazhagam, by a margin of 2,189 votes.
