= Malaiyarasan D =

Indian politician

Member of Parliament, Lok Sabha
- Incumbent
- Assumed office 2024
- Preceded by: Gautham Sigamani
- Constituency: Kallakurichi

Personal details
- Party: Dravida Munnetra Kazhagam
- Occupation: Politician

Malaiyarasan D is an Indian politician. He is a member of Dravida Munnetra Kazhagam party. He has been elected to Lok Sabha from Kallakurichi Lok Sabha constituency.
