= Kallakurichi Lok Sabha constituency =

Parliamentary constituency in Tamil Nadu, India

Coordinates: 11.7°N 79.0°E

Kallakurichi
- Lok Sabha constituency
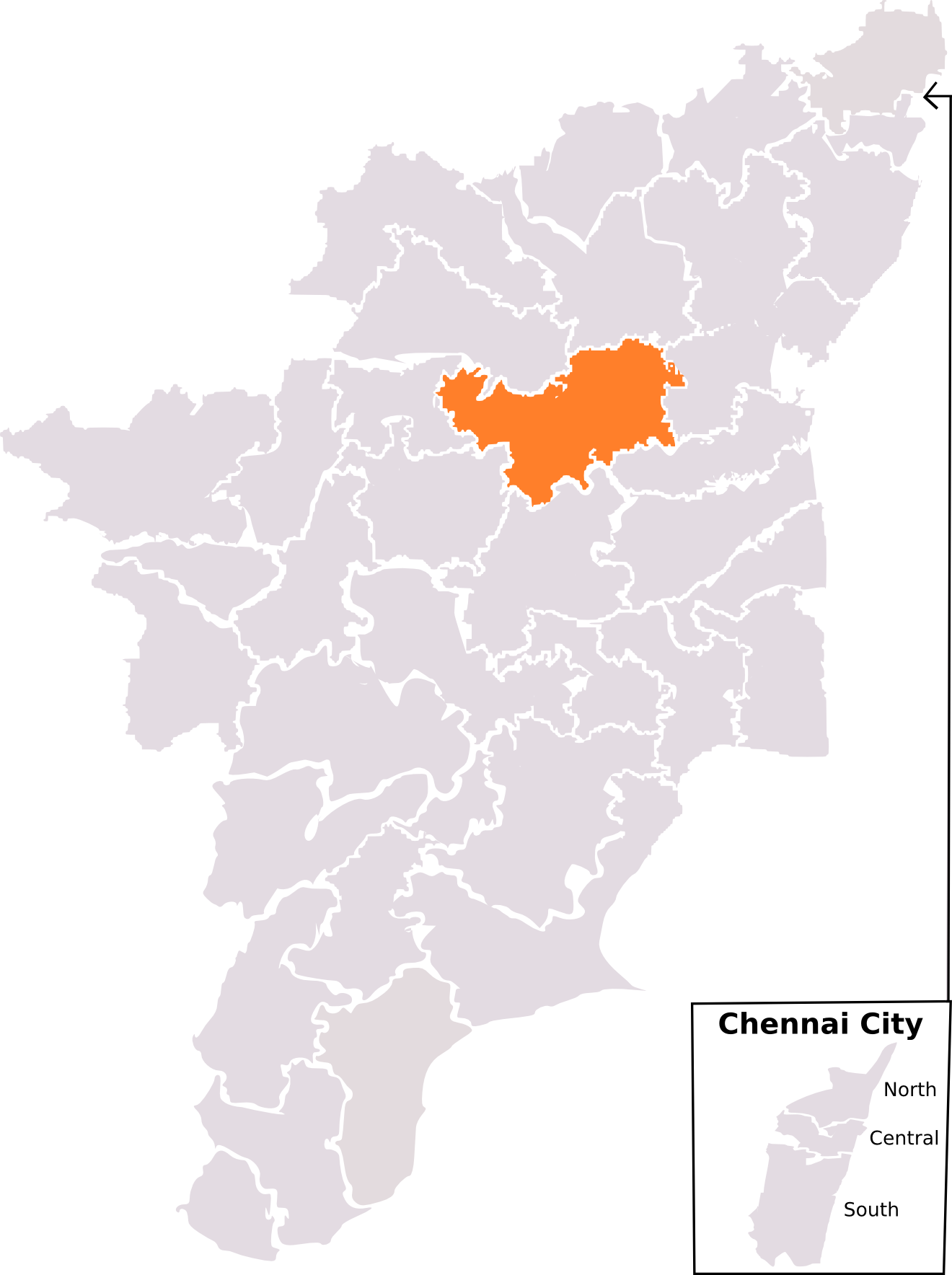
- Kallakurichi constituency, post-2008 delimitation

Constituency details
- Country: India
- Region: South India
- State: Tamil Nadu
- Assembly constituencies: Rishivandiyam; Sankarapuram; Kallakurichi; Gangavalli; Attur; Yercaud
- Established: 2009
- Total electors: 15,28,539

Member of Parliament
- 18th Lok Sabha
- Incumbent Malaiyarasan D
- Party: DMK
- Alliance: None
- Elected year: 2024

Kallakurichi Lok Sabha constituency is one of the 39 Lok Sabha constituencies in Tamil Nadu state in southern India. Its Tamil Nadu Parliamentary Constituency number is 14. This constituency came into existence following the implementation of delimitation of parliamentary constituencies in 2008.

== Assembly segments ==
Kallakurichi Lok Sabha constituency comprises the following six Legislative Assembly segments:

Constituency number	Name	Reserved for (SC/ST/None)	District	Party	2024 Lead
78.	Rishivandiyam	None	Kallakurichi	DMK	DMK
79.	Sankarapuram	None	Kallakurichi	AIADMK	DMK
80.	Kallakurichi	SC	Kallakurichi	TVK	DMK
81.	Gangavalli	SC	Salem	AIADMK	DMK
82.	Attur	SC	Salem	AIADMK	DMK
83.	Yercaud	ST	Salem	AIADMK	DMK

== Members of the Parliament ==
Vote share of Winning candidates
2024	44.94%
2019	60.22%
2014	48.65%
2009	42.67%
1971	52.79%
1967	52.81%

Year	Winner	Party
1967	M. Deiveekan	Dravida Munnetra Kazhagam
1975	M. Deiveekan	Dravida Munnetra Kazhagam
2009	Adhi Sankar	Dravida Munnetra Kazhagam
2014	Kalitheerthan Kamaraj	All India Anna Dravida Munnetra Kazhagam
2019	Pon. Gautham Sigamani	Dravida Munnetra Kazhagam
2024	D. Malaiyarasan	Dravida Munnetra Kazhagam

== Election results ==
=== General Elections 2024 ===
2024 Indian general election: Kallakurichi
Party	Candidate	Votes	%	±%
DMK	Malaiyarasan D	561,589	44.94	▼15.28
AIADMK	R. Kumaraguru	5,07,805	40.64	▲13.75
PMK	R. Devadass Wodeyar	71,290	5.71	New
NOTA	None of the above	8,532	0.68	▼0.29
Margin of victory		53,784	4.30	▼29.67
Turnout		12,49,568	79.21	▲0.40
Registered electors		1,568,651		
DMK hold		Swing	▼15.28	

=== General Elections 2019 ===
2019 Indian general election: Kallakurichi
Party	Candidate	Votes	%	±%
DMK	Gautham Sigamani Pon	721,713	60.22%	31.96%
DMDK	L. K. Sudhish	3,21,794	26.85%	11.88%
Independent	M. Komugi Maniyan	50,179	4.19%	
MNM	H. Ganesh	14,587	1.22%	
NOTA	None of the above	11,576	0.97%	−0.03%
Independent	B. Sumathi	10,045	0.84%	
Independent	V. Chandrasekaran	8,066	0.67%	
Margin of victory		3,99,919	33.37%	12.98%
Turnout		11,98,423	78.81%	0.77%
Registered electors		15,28,938		8.24%
DMK gain from AIADMK		Swing	11.57%	

=== General Elections 2014 ===
2014 Indian general election: Kallakurichi
Party	Candidate	Votes	%	±%
AIADMK	K. Kamaraj	533,383	48.65%	
DMK	R. Manimaran	3,09,876	28.26%	−14.41%
DMDK	V. P. Eswaran	1,64,183	14.98%	−0.54%
INC	R. Devadass	39,677	3.62%	
NOTA	None of the above	10,901	0.99%	
Independent	S. Madaiyan	7,314	0.67%	
Independent	M. P. Mannan	6,186	0.56%	
BSP	S. Sakthivel	5,929	0.54%	−0.17%
Independent	M. Varadan	5,054	0.46%	
Margin of victory		2,23,507	20.39%	7.64%
Turnout		10,96,340	78.41%	0.60%
Registered electors		14,12,499		27.67%
AIADMK gain from DMK		Swing	5.98%	

=== General Elections 2009 ===
2009 Indian general election: Kallakurichi
Party	Candidate	Votes	%	±%
DMK	Adhi Sankar	363,601	42.67%	
PMK	K. Dhanaraju	2,54,993	29.93%	
DMDK	L. K. Sudhish	1,32,223	15.52%	
KNMK	S. Ramesh	17,818	2.09%	
Independent	A. Arun Kennedi	13,216	1.55%	
Independent	T. Vijaya Rajendhar	8,211	0.96%	
Independent	G. Sivaraman	7,463	0.88%	
Independent	S. Sathish Babu	7,136	0.84%	
Independent	J. Selvaraju	7,012	0.82%	
BSP	K. Senthilkumar	6,030	0.71%	
Independent	T. Dhanaraj	5,789	0.68%	
Margin of victory		1,08,608	12.75%	
Turnout		8,52,073	77.28%	
Registered electors		11,06,352		
DMK win (new seat)				

=== General Elections 1971 ===
1971 Indian general election: Kallakurichi
Party	Candidate	Votes	%	±%
DMK	M. Devekan	207,721	52.79%	−0.01%
INC(O)	K. Veerasamy	1,85,745	47.21%	1.66%
Margin of victory		21,976	5.59%	−1.67%
Turnout		3,93,466	72.40%	−3.23%
Registered electors		5,58,064		11.88%
DMK hold		Swing	-0.01%	

=== General Elections 1967 ===
1967 Indian general election: Kallakurichi
Party	Candidate	Votes	%	±%
DMK	M. Devekan	193,043	52.81%	
INC	K. Parthasarathy	1,66,520	45.55%	
Independent	M. Vajjiravel	6,000	1.64%	
Margin of victory		26,523	7.26%	
Turnout		3,65,563	75.63%	
Registered electors		4,98,804		
DMK win (new seat)				

== See also ==
- Viluppuram District
- Salem District
- List of constituencies of the Lok Sabha
- Rasipuram (Lok Sabha constituency)
