= R. Masilamani =

Indian politician

R. Masilamani is an Indian politician and a member of the Tamil Nadu Legislative Assembly. He hails from the Mailam area of Viluppuram district. Having completed his schooling in Tindivanam, Masilamani earned his Bachelor of Medicine (MBBS) from the Thanjavur Government Medical College.

In the 2016 Tamil Nadu Legislative Assembly elections, he contested as a candidate of the Dravida Munnetra Kazhagam (DMK) from the Mailam Assembly constituency and was elected to the Tamil Nadu Legislative Assembly. Previously, he had also contested and won from the Tindivanam Assembly constituency in the 1989 Tamil Nadu Legislative Assembly election.

== Electoral performance ==
=== 1989 ===
1989 Tamil Nadu Legislative Assembly election: Tindivanam
Party	Candidate	Votes	%	±%
DMK	R. Masilamani	39,504	48.05%	New
INC	K. Ramamurthi	28,749	34.97%	−23.7
AIADMK	G. R. Ravindhran	6,258	7.61%	New
AIADMK	K. M. Thangamani	4,478	5.45%	New
Independent	S. Gandhidass	941	1.14%	New
Independent	T. R. Maheswaran	525	0.64%	New
Margin of victory		10,755	13.08%	−11.88%
Turnout		82,210	64.44%	−7.11%
Registered electors		129,844		
DMK gain from INC		Swing	-10.61%	

=== 2016 ===
2016 Tamil Nadu Legislative Assembly election: Mailam
Party	Candidate	Votes	%	±%
DMK	Dr. R. Masilamani	70,880	41.40%	New
AIADMK	K. Annadurai	58,574	34.21%	−19.71
PMK	V. R. Rajashekaran	25,711	15.02%	−25.64
VCK	S. S. Balaji	10,866	6.35%	New
NOTA	NOTA	1,722	1.01%	New
Margin of victory		12,306	7.19%	−6.07%
Turnout		171,211	81.00%	−1.47%
Registered electors		211,372		
DMK gain from AIADMK		Swing	-12.52%	
