= Gautham Sigamani =

Indian politician

Member of Parliament, Lok Sabha
- In office 2019–2024
- Preceded by: Kalitheerthan Kamaraj
- Succeeded by: Malaiyarasan D
- Constituency: Kallakurichi, Tamil Nadu

Personal details
- Born: 21 August 1974 (age 51) Viluppuram, Tamil Nadu, India
- Party: Dravida Munnetra Kazhagam
- Spouse: Dr Kavita
- Parent: K. Ponmudy

Dr Gautham Sigamani Ponmudi is an Indian politician and a former Member of Parliament for the Kallakurichi Lok Sabha Constituency. He was elected to the Lok Sabha, lower house of the Parliament of India from Kallakurichi, Tamil Nadu in the 2019 Indian general election as member of the Dravida Munnetra Kazhagam. He is the son of K. Ponmudy. He along with wife Dr Kavitha Gautam run Bloom Healthcare.
