= D. Haridoss =

Indian politician

D. Haridoss (born 21 October 1948) is an Indian politician and was a member of the 14th Tamil Nadu Legislative Assembly from the Tindivanam constituency, which is reserved for candidates from the Scheduled Castes. He represented the All India Anna Dravida Munnetra Kazhagam party.

Haridoss was born in Pandhamangalam on 21 October 1948 and is married with two children. He practises as a doctor and has the MBBS and MS degrees.
