= R. Lakshmanan =

Indian politician

Dr. R. Lakshmanan MLA

Member of the Tamil Nadu Legislative Assembly
- Incumbent
- Assumed office 7 May 2021
- Preceded by: C. V. Shanmugam
- Constituency: Villupuram

Member of Parliament, Rajya Sabha
- In office 25 July 2013 – 24 July 2019
- Constituency: Tamil Nadu

Personal details
- Born: 29 November 1971 (age 54) Villupuram, Tamilnadu
- Party: DMK
- Other party: AIADMK (till 2020)
- Spouse: L.Mahalakshmi
- Education: M.B.B.S., D.Ortho.
- Alma mater: Rajah Muthiah Medical College Hospital
- Occupation: Politician

R. Lakshmanan (born 29 November 1971; Villupuram (Tamil Nadu)) is an Indian politician. He is currently the Member of the legislative assembly representing Villupuram constituency. He was a Member of Parliament, representing All India Anna Dravida Munnetra Kazhagam from Tamil Nadu in the Rajya Sabha (the upper house of India's Parliament).

He quit AIADMK and joined Dravida Munnetra Kazhagam (DMK) political party in 2020. He defeated Ex-minister C.V.Shanmugam by 14,868 votes in 2021 Tamil Nadu legislative assembly elections.

== See also ==
- List of Rajya Sabha members from Tamil Nadu
