= M. Shanmugam =

Indian politician

Member of Parliament, Rajya Sabha
- In office 25 July 2019 – 24 July 2025
- Preceded by: T. Rathinavel, AIADMK
- Succeeded by: S. R. Sivalingam
- Constituency: Tamil Nadu

General Secretary of Labour Progressive Federation

Personal details
- Political party: Dravida Munnetra Kazhagam

M. Shanmugam is an Indian politician and former Member of Parliament, Rajya Sabha from Tamil Nadu State. Shanmugam is the secretary general of the Labour Progressive Federation.

He belongs to the DMK.
