= P. Seethapathy =

Indian politician

P Seethapathy is an Indian politician and Member of the Legislative Assembly of Tamil Nadu. She was elected to the Tamil Nadu Legislative Assembly from Tindivanam constituency as a Dravida Munnetra Kazhagam in the 2016 election.
