= K. Ponmudy =

Indian politician

Dr. K. Ponmudi

Cabinet Minister Government of Tamil Nadu
- In office 28 September 2024 – 27 April 2025
- Minister: Minister for Forests
- Chief Minister: M. K. Stalin
- Preceded by: M. Mathiventhan
- Succeeded by: Raja Kannappan
- In office 22 March 2024 – 28 September 2024
- Minister: Minister for Higher Education
- Chief Minister: M. K. Stalin
- Preceded by: Raja Kannappan
- Succeeded by: Govi. Chezhian
- In office 7 May 2021 – 21 December 2023
- Minister: Minister for Higher Education
- Chief Minister: M. K. Stalin
- Preceded by: K. P. Anbalagan
- Succeeded by: Raja Kannappan
- In office 13 May 2006 – 15 May 2011
- Minister: Minister for Education
- Chief Minister: M. Karunanidhi
- Preceded by: C. V. Shanmugam
- Succeeded by: P. Palaniappan
- In office 13 May 1996 – 13 May 2001
- Minister: Minister for Transport & Highways
- Chief Minister: M. Karunanidhi
- Preceded by: K. A. Sengottaiyan
- Succeeded by: Nainar Nagendran
- In office 27 January 1989 – 30 January 1991
- Minister: Minister for Health
- Chief Minister: M. Karunanidhi
- Preceded by: P. U. Shanmugam
- Succeeded by: S. Muthusamy

Member of the Tamil Nadu Legislative Assembly
- In office 19 May 2016 – 4 May 2026
- Preceded by: L. Venkatesan
- Succeeded by: S. Palaniswamy
- Constituency: Tirukkoyilur
- In office 10 May 1996 – 14 May 2011
- Preceded by: D. Janardhanan
- Succeeded by: C. V. Shanmugam
- Constituency: Villupuram
- In office 6 February 1989 – 30 January 1991
- Preceded by: M. Mani Rajarathinam
- Succeeded by: D. Janardhanan
- Constituency: Villupuram

Personal details
- Born: 19 August 1950 (age 76) T. Edaiyar, Tirukoilur Taluk, South Arcot district, Madras.
- Party: Dravida Munnetra Kazhagam
- Spouse: Visalakshi
- Children: Dr Gowtham Sigamani, Dr Ashok Sigamani

K. Ponmudi (born Deivasigamani K, 19 August 1950) is an Indian politician and the Former Minister for Forests of Tamil Nadu, who was disqualified in 2023 after the Madras High Court convicted him in the disproportionate assets case. He was the Minister for Higher Education of Tamil Nadu from 2006 to 2011. He was born in T. Edaiyar in the Villupuram district. He has a bachelor's degree in law, a master's degree in history, political science and public administration and a doctorate in political science. He is an alumnus of Annamalai University. Before entering professional politics, he was a professor in the Villupuram government college. He has been elected to the Tamil Nadu assembly five times. From 1989 to 1991 during Dravida Munnetra Kazhagam rule he was the Minister for Health, and from 1996 to 2001 he was the Minister for Transport and Highways. He authored a book titled Dravidian Movement in India and Black Movement in the U.S.A. On April 24, 2025, the Madras High Court decided to initiate suo motu proceedings against K. Ponmudy for his vulgar remarks against Shaivism, Vaishnavism, and women, which it deemed prima facie hate speech.

== Conviction ==
On 19 December 2023, The Madras High Court convicted him in disproportionate assets case for amassing assets during his tenure as minister for Mines and Minerals in 2006–2011 DMK Government. On 21 December 2023, he and his wife were sentenced to three years imprisonment as well as to a fine of ₹50 lakhs each by the Madras High Court. The court stayed the sentence imposed on them to appeal before the Supreme Court for 30 days. As a result, Ponmudi was disqualified as an MLA and minister as per Representation of the People Act, 1951.

== Electoral results ==
Elections	Constituency	Party	Result	Vote %	Opposition Candidate	Opposition Party	Opposition Vote %
1989	Villupuram	DMK	Won	47.18	ABDUL LATHEEF S	INC	23.39
1991	Villupuram	DMK	Lost	33.37	D. JANAARDHANAN	ADMK	48.82
1996	Villupuram	DMK	Won	58.24	PANNEERSELVAM, S.S.	ADMK	25.90
2001	Villupuram	DMK	Won	47.45	R.PASUPATHY	PMK	45.86
2006	Villupuram	DMK	Won	46.87	PASUPATHY.R	ADMK	40.56
2011	Villupuram	DMK	Lost	45.19	C. V. Shanmugam	ADMK	52.18
2016	Tirukkoyilur	DMK	Won	49.80	GOTHANDARAMAN G	ADMK	37.44
2021	Tirukkoyilur	DMK	Won	56.56	VAT.KALIVARADHAN	BJP	26.14
