= R. Sedunathan =

Indian politician

R. Sedunathan is an Indian politician and was a Member of the Legislative Assembly. He was elected to the Tamil Nadu legislative assembly as a Dravida Munnetra Kazhagam (DMK) candidate from Tindivanam constituency in the 1996 election.
