= N. Pugazhenthi =

Indian politician (1952/1953 – 2024)

Member of the Tamil Nadu Legislative Assembly
- In office 12 May 2021 – 6 April 2024
- Preceded by: R. Muthamilselvan
- Succeeded by: Anniyur Siva
- Constituency: Vikravandi

Personal details
- Born: 1952/1953
- Died: 6 April 2024 (aged 71) Mundiyampakkam, Viluppuram district, Tamil Nadu, India
- Political party: Dravida Munnetra Kazhagam

N. Pugazhenthi (1952/1953 – 6 April 2024) was an Indian politician who was a Member of Legislative Assembly of Tamil Nadu. He was elected from Vikravandi as a Dravida Munnetra Kazhagam candidate in 2021. Pugazhenthi died on 6 April 2024, at the age of 71.

== Elections contested ==
| Election | Constituency | Party | Result | Vote % | Runner-up | Runner-up Party | Runner-up vote % |
|---|---|---|---|---|---|---|---|
| 2021 Tamil Nadu Legislative Assembly election | Vikravandi | DMK | Won | 51.27% | R. Muthamilselvan | ADMK | 39.81% |
