= C. Tamilselvan =

Indian politician

C. Tamilselvan was elected to the Tamil Nadu Legislative Assembly from the Yercaud constituency in the 2006 elections. He was a candidate of the Dravida Munnetra Kazhagam (DMK) party.
