= Yercaud Assembly constituency =

State Legislative Assembly Constituency in Tamil Nadu

Coordinates: 11.7794°N 78.2034°E

Yercaud
- Constituency No. 83 for the Tamil Nadu Legislative Assembly

Constituency details
- Country: India
- Region: South India
- State: Tamil Nadu
- District: Salem
- Lok Sabha constituency: Kallakurichi
- Established: 1957
- Total electors: 2,72,937
- Reservation: ST

Member of Legislative Assembly
- 17th Tamil Nadu Legislative Assembly
- Incumbent P. Usharani
- Party: AIADMK
- Alliance: NDA
- Elected year: 2026

Yercaud is a state assembly constituency in Salem district of Tamil Nadu, India. Its State Assembly Constituency number is 83. The seat is reserved for candidates from the Scheduled Tribes and comprises Yercaud taluk, Vazhapadi taluk, and portions of Salem and Attur taluks. It is a part of the wider Kallakurichi Lok Sabha constituency for national elections to the Parliament of India. The constituency has been in existence since 1957 election. It is one of the 234 State Legislative Assembly Constituencies in Tamil Nadu, India.

== Members of Legislative Assembly ==
=== Madras State ===
Year	Winner	Party
1957	S. Andi Goundan	Indian National Congress
1957	S. Lakshmana Goundar	Indian National Congress
1962	M. Kolandaisamy Gounder	Indian National Congress
1967	V. Chinnasamy	Dravida Munnetra Kazhagam

=== Tamil Nadu ===
Year	Winner	Party
1971	V. Chinnasamy	Dravida Munnetra Kazhagam
1977	R. Kaliappan	All India Anna Dravida Munnetra Kazhagam
1980	Thiruman	All India Anna Dravida Munnetra Kazhagam
1984	P. R. Thirugnanam	Indian National Congress
1989	C. Perumal	All India Anna Dravida Munnetra Kazhagam
1991	C. Perumal	All India Anna Dravida Munnetra Kazhagam
1996	V. Perumal	Dravida Munnetra Kazhagam
2001	K. T. Elayakannu	All India Anna Dravida Munnetra Kazhagam
2006	C. Tamilselvan	Dravida Munnetra Kazhagam
2011	C. Perumal	All India Anna Dravida Munnetra Kazhagam
2013^	P. Saroja	All India Anna Dravida Munnetra Kazhagam
2016	G. Chitra	All India Anna Dravida Munnetra Kazhagam
2021	G. Chitra	All India Anna Dravida Munnetra Kazhagam
2026	P. Usharani	All India Anna Dravida Munnetra Kazhagam

== Election results ==
Vote share of winning candidates
2026	34.61%
2021	51.30%
2016	45.18%
2014 by-election	67.99%
2011	58.06%
2006	42.94%
2001	64.35%
1996	45.15%
1991	72.33%
1989	36.20%
1984	74.40%
1980	51.35%
1977	42.29%
1971	60.81%
1967	56.25%
1962	52.47%
1957	26.24%

=== 2026 ===
2026 Tamil Nadu Legislative Assembly election: Yercaud
Party	Candidate	Votes	%	±%
AIADMK	Usharani. P	87,772	34.61	▼16.69
TVK	Lakshmi Janarthanan. J	85,583	33.75	New
DMK	Revathi. T.M	68,045	26.83	▼13.52
NTK	Palanisamy. M	7,601	3.00	▼2.62
NOTA	NOTA	1,250	0.49	▼0.35
BSP	Palanisamy. K	910	0.36	New
CPI(ML)L	Gopi. C	658	0.26	New
Independent	Venkatesan. S	513	0.20	New
Independent	Pazhanivel. K	303	0.12	New
Independent	Thangadurai. N	294	0.12	New
TVK	Vengateshsan. T	235	0.09	New
Independent	Vijayakumar. N	211	0.08	New
Independent	Kaliyappan. A	123	0.05	New
Independent	Karthik. N	94	0.04	New
Margin of victory		2,189	0.86	▼10.09
Turnout		2,53,592	92.91	▲9.49
Registered electors		2,72,937		▼11,092
AIADMK hold		Swing	▼16.69	

=== 2021 ===
2021 Tamil Nadu Legislative Assembly election: Yercaud
Party	Candidate	Votes	%	±%
AIADMK	G. Chitra	121,561	51.30%	+6.12
DMK	C. Tamilselvan	95,606	40.35%	+2.98
NTK	Jothi	13,308	5.62%	+5.05
DMDK	C. Kumar	2,986	1.26%	−3.44
NOTA	NOTA	1,979	0.84%	−0.57
Margin of victory		25,955	10.95%	3.14%
Turnout		236,945	83.42%	−2.13%
Rejected ballots		360	0.15%	
Registered electors		284,029		
AIADMK hold		Swing	6.12%	

=== 2016 ===
2016 Tamil Nadu Legislative Assembly election: Yercaud
Party	Candidate	Votes	%	±%
AIADMK	G. Chitra	100,562	45.18%	−12.88
DMK	C. Tamilselvan	83,168	37.37%	+0.24
PMK	R. Selvam	17,998	8.09%	New
DMDK	C. Kumar	10,455	4.70%	New
NOTA	NOTA	3,136	1.41%	New
BJP	Pon Rasa	2,225	1.00%	−0.26
NTK	T. Sengottuvel	1,265	0.57%	New
Margin of victory		17,394	7.82%	−13.12%
Turnout		222,566	85.55%	0.14%
Registered electors		260,157		
AIADMK hold		Swing	-22.17%	

=== 2014 by-election ===
By-election, 2014: Yercaud
Party	Candidate	Votes	%	±%
AIADMK	Saroja Perumal	1,42,771	67.99	+9.93
DMK	Maran V	64,655	30.79	−6.39
IND	Rajendiran A	793	0.38	+0.38
IND	S. A. Palani	662	0.32	+0.32
Majority		78,116	36.43	+15.50
Turnout		2,14,406	89.16	+3.74
AIADMK hold		Swing	+9.93	

=== 2011 ===
2011 Tamil Nadu Legislative Assembly election: Yercaud
Party	Candidate	Votes	%	±%
AIADMK	C. Perumal	104,221	58.06%	+18.74
DMK	C. Tamilselvan	66,639	37.13%	−5.81
Independent	L. Selvam	2,437	1.36%	New
BJP	P. Rajaselvam	2,266	1.26%	−0
IJK	K. Maheswaran	2,185	1.22%	New
Independent	S. Sivakumar	1,744	0.97%	New
Margin of victory		37,582	20.94%	17.32%
Turnout		179,492	85.41%	12.92%
Registered electors		210,158		
AIADMK gain from DMK		Swing	15.12%	

=== 2006 ===
2006 Tamil Nadu Legislative Assembly election: Yercaud
Party	Candidate	Votes	%	±%
DMK	C. Tamilselvan	48,791	42.94%	New
AIADMK	J. Alamelu	44,684	39.33%	−25.03
DMDK	V. Ramakrishnan	10,740	9.45%	New
Independent	K. Shanmugam	3,073	2.70%	New
Independent	T. Rajasekaran	2,220	1.95%	New
BJP	P. Chellammal	1,440	1.27%	−29.08
Independent	V. Murugesan	698	0.61%	New
Independent	E. Kuppayee	610	0.54%	New
Independent	R. Ramar	573	0.50%	New
Margin of victory		4,107	3.61%	−30.39%
Turnout		113,626	72.49%	11.39%
Registered electors		156,742		
DMK gain from AIADMK		Swing	-21.41%	

=== 2001 ===
2001 Tamil Nadu Legislative Assembly election: Yercaud
Party	Candidate	Votes	%	±%
AIADMK	K. T. Elayakannu	64,319	64.35%	+30.09
BJP	K. Govindan	30,334	30.35%	+29.23
Independent	R. Vadivel	2,483	2.48%	New
Independent	P. Sampathkumar	856	0.86%	New
JD(U)	C. Dhannalakshmi	847	0.85%	New
Margin of victory		33,985	34.00%	23.12%
Turnout		99,950	61.10%	−2.88%
Registered electors		163,608		
AIADMK gain from DMK		Swing	19.20%	

=== 1996 ===
1996 Tamil Nadu Legislative Assembly election: Yercaud
Party	Candidate	Votes	%	±%
DMK	V. Perumal	38,964	45.15%	+28.39
AIADMK	R. Gunasekaran	29,570	34.26%	−38.06
AIIC(T)	K. Shanmugam	12,900	14.95%	New
JD	R. Kuppusamy	3,589	4.16%	New
BJP	M. Eswaran	970	1.12%	−0.23
Margin of victory		9,394	10.89%	−44.68%
Turnout		86,302	63.98%	2.70%
Registered electors		150,278		
DMK gain from AIADMK		Swing	-27.18%	

=== 1991 ===
1991 Tamil Nadu Legislative Assembly election: Yercaud
Party	Candidate	Votes	%	±%
AIADMK	C. Perumal	59,324	72.33%	+36.13
DMK	Dhanakodi Vedan	13,745	16.76%	−10.59
PMK	P. Ponnusami	7,392	9.01%	New
BJP	P. Periathambi	1,111	1.35%	New
JP	K. Andi	449	0.55%	New
Margin of victory		45,579	55.57%	46.72%
Turnout		82,021	61.28%	1.94%
Registered electors		141,647		
AIADMK hold		Swing	36.13%	

=== 1989 ===
1989 Tamil Nadu Legislative Assembly election: Yercaud
Party	Candidate	Votes	%	±%
AIADMK	C. Perumal	26,355	36.20%	New
DMK	V. Dhanakodi	19,914	27.35%	+1.75
INC	P. R. Thirugnanam	13,430	18.45%	−55.96
AIADMK	R. Gunasekaran	11,012	15.12%	New
Independent	V. Chinnasamy	1,211	1.66%	New
Independent	N. Nallan	521	0.72%	New
Margin of victory		6,441	8.85%	−39.96%
Turnout		72,810	59.35%	−7.32%
Registered electors		126,870		
AIADMK gain from INC		Swing	-38.21%	

=== 1984 ===
1984 Tamil Nadu Legislative Assembly election: Yercaud
Party	Candidate	Votes	%	±%
INC	P. R. Thirugnanam	48,787	74.40%	New
DMK	K. Manickam	16,785	25.60%	−22.47
Margin of victory		32,002	48.80%	45.52%
Turnout		65,572	66.66%	9.18%
Registered electors		105,516		
INC gain from AIADMK		Swing	23.05%	

=== 1980 ===
1980 Tamil Nadu Legislative Assembly election: Yercaud
Party	Candidate	Votes	%	±%
AIADMK	Thiruman	28,869	51.35%	+9.06
DMK	R. Natesan	27,020	48.06%	+19.94
Margin of victory		1,849	3.29%	−10.88%
Turnout		56,218	57.48%	4.12%
Registered electors		99,409		
AIADMK hold		Swing	9.06%	

=== 1977 ===
1977 Tamil Nadu Legislative Assembly election: Yercaud
Party	Candidate	Votes	%	±%
AIADMK	R. Kaliappan	20,219	42.29%	New
DMK	V. Chinnaswamy	13,444	28.12%	−32.69
INC	P. K. Chinnaswamy	8,302	17.36%	−21.83
JP	M. A. Mani	5,845	12.23%	New
Margin of victory		6,775	14.17%	−7.44%
Turnout		47,810	53.37%	−7.48%
Registered electors		91,099		
AIADMK gain from DMK		Swing	-18.52%	

=== 1971 ===
1971 Tamil Nadu Legislative Assembly election: Yercaud
Party	Candidate	Votes	%	±%
DMK	V. Chinnusamy	29,196	60.81%	+4.55
INC	K. Chinna Gounden	18,818	39.19%	−4.55
Margin of victory		10,378	21.61%	9.10%
Turnout		48,014	60.85%	−1.08%
Registered electors		81,344		
DMK hold		Swing	4.55%	

=== 1967 ===
1967 Madras Legislative Assembly election: Yercaud
Party	Candidate	Votes	%	±%
DMK	V. Chinnasamy	25,124	56.25%	+8.72
INC	Ponnudurai	19,537	43.75%	−8.72
Margin of victory		5,587	12.51%	7.58%
Turnout		44,661	61.92%	17.09%
Registered electors		75,302		
DMK gain from INC		Swing	3.79%	

=== 1962 ===
1962 Madras Legislative Assembly election: Yercaud
Party	Candidate	Votes	%	±%
INC	M. Kolandaisamy Gounder	19,921	52.47%	+26.23
DMK	Chinna Gounder	18,048	47.53%	New
Margin of victory		1,873	4.93%	3.70%
Turnout		37,969	44.83%	−12.25%
Registered electors		88,851		
INC hold		Swing	26.23%	

=== 1957 ===
1957 Madras Legislative Assembly election: Yercaud
Party	Candidate	Votes	%	±%
INC	S. Andi Goundan (St)	23,864	26.24%	New
INC	S. Lakshmana Goundar	22,747	25.01%	New
Independent	Raja Paul David	19,576	21.52%	New
Independent	Kuppusami Goundan (St)	10,471	11.51%	New
Independent	Chinna Goundan (St)	8,524	9.37%	New
Independent	P. K. Chinnusamy (St)	5,768	6.34%	New
Margin of victory		1,117	1.23%	
Turnout		90,950	57.09%	
Registered electors		159,323		
INC win (new seat)				
