= Anniyur Siva =

Indian politician

Member of Tamil Nadu Legislative Assembly
- In office 13 July 2024 – 4 May 2026
- Preceded by: N. Pugazhenthi
- Succeeded by: C. Sivakumar
- Constituency: Vikravandi

Personal details
- Party: Dravida Munnetra Kazhagam

Anniyur Siva is an Indian politician from Tamil Nadu. As a member of Dravida Munnetra Kazhagam, he is the incumbent MLA from Vikravandi.
