= Vikravandi Assembly constituency =

State Legislative Assembly Constituency in Tamil Nadu

Coordinates: 12°02′21″N 79°31′36″E

Vikravandi
- Constituency No. 75 for the Tamil Nadu Legislative Assembly

Constituency details
- Country: India
- Region: South India
- State: Tamil Nadu
- District: Villupuram
- Lok Sabha constituency: Villupuram
- Established: 1951
- Total electors: 2,29,182

Member of Legislative Assembly
- 17th Tamil Nadu Legislative Assembly
- Incumbent C. Sivakumar
- Party: PMK
- Alliance: NDA
- Elected year: 2026

Vikravandi is a state assembly constituency in Tamil Nadu, India, formed for the second time after constituency delimitations in 2008. Its State Assembly Constituency number is 75. It comprises a portion of Viluppuram taluk and is included in Viluppuram Lok Sabha constituency for national elections to the Parliament of India. It is one of the 234 State Legislative Assembly Constituencies in Tamil Nadu.

== Members of Legislative Assembly ==
Year	Member	Political party
2011	R. Ramamurthy	Communist Party of India (Marxist)
2016	K. Rathamani	Dravida Munnetra Kazhagam
2019 (Note: By-Election)	R. Muthamilselvan	All India Anna Dravida Munnetra Kazhagam
2021	N. Pugazhenthi	Dravida Munnetra Kazhagam
2024	Anniyur Siva	Dravida Munnetra Kazhagam
2026	C. Sivakumar	Pattali Makkal Katchi

== Election results ==
Vote share of winning candidates
2026	33.33%
2024^	63.22%
2021	48.69%
2019^	60.29%
2016	35.69%
2011	51.72%
1952	47.60%

=== 2026 ===
2026 Tamil Nadu Legislative Assembly election: Vikravandi
Party	Candidate	Votes	%	±%
PMK	Sivakumar C	69,727	33.33	▲4.64
TVK	Vijai Vadivel A	68,817	32.89	New
DMK	Anniyur Siva	60,941	29.13	▼34.09
NTK	Subha Chandrasekaran A	4,979	2.38	▼3.02
Margin of victory		910	0.44	▼34.09
Turnout		2,09,231	91.29	▲8.81
Registered electors		2,29,182		▲1,613
PMK gain from DMK		Swing	▲4.64	

=== 2024 by-election ===
2024 Tamil Nadu Legislative Assembly by-election: Vikravandi
Party	Candidate	Votes	%	±%
DMK	Anniyur Siva	124,053	63.22	▲14.53
PMK	C. Anbumani	56,296	28.69	New
NTK	Abinaya Ponnivalavan	10,602	5.40	▲1.13
NOTA	None of the Above	859	0.44	▼0.14
Majority		67,757	34.53	▲29.56
Turnout		196,233	82.48	▲0.44
DMK hold		Swing		

=== 2021 ===
2021 Tamil Nadu Legislative Assembly election: Vikravandi
Party	Candidate	Votes	%	±%
DMK	N. Pugazhenthi	93,730	48.69	▲12.21
AIADMK	R. Muthamilselvan	84,157	43.72	▼16.57
NTK	R. Sheeba Ashmi	8,216	4.27	▲2.72
AMMK	R. Iyyanar	3,053	1.59	New
NOTA	None of the Above	1,122	0.58	▼0.24
Margin of victory		9,573	4.97	▼18.83
Turnout		192,495	82.04	▼2.31
Rejected ballots		209	0.11	
Registered electors		234,624		
DMK hold		Swing	13.00	

=== 2019 by-election ===
By-election, 2019: Vikravandi
Party	Candidate	Votes	%	±%
AIADMK	Muthamil Selvan R.	113,766	60.29	▲28.47
DMK	N. Pugazhenthi	68,842	36.48	▲0.79
NTK	Kandasamy K	2,921	1.55	New
NOTA	None of the Above	1,560	0.83	▲0.05
Majority		44,924	23.81	▲19.94
Turnout		188,700	84.35	▲2.64
AIADMK gain from DMK		Swing		

=== 2016 ===
2016 Tamil Nadu Legislative Assembly election: Vikravandi
Party	Candidate	Votes	%	±%
DMK	K. Rathamani	63,757	35.69	▼6.24
AIADMK	R. Velu	56,845	31.82	New
PMK	C. Anbumani	41,428	23.19	New
CPI(M)	R. Ramamurthy	9,981	5.59	▼46.14
NOTA	None of the Above	1,385	0.78	New
BJP	S. Aadhavan	1,291	0.72	New
Margin of victory		6,912	3.87	▼5.93
Turnout		178,637	81.71	▲0.32
Registered electors		218,619		
DMK gain from CPI(M)		Swing	-16.03	

=== 2011 ===
2011 Tamil Nadu Legislative Assembly election: Vikravandi
Party	Candidate	Votes	%	±%
CPI(M)	R. Ramamurthy	78,656	51.72	New
DMK	K. Rathamani	63,759	41.93	New
Independent	K. Ramamoorthi	2,442	1.61	New
Puratchi Bharatham	A. Kannadhsan	2,212	1.45	New
Independent	M. Kamalakannan	1,547	1.02	New
BSP	V. Kaliyaperumal	1,118	0.74	New
Independent	T. Ramamuthy	892	0.59	New
Margin of victory		14,897	9.80	
Turnout		152,070	81.39	
Registered electors		186,842		
CPI(M) win (new seat)				

=== 1952 ===
1952 Madras Legislative Assembly election: Vikravandi
Party	Candidate	Votes	%	±%
TTP	Govindaswamy Nayagar	21,148	47.60	New
INC	Bhashyam Reddiar	19,298	43.43	New
Independent	Ramaswamy Iyer	1,760	3.96	New
Independent	Muthukumaraswamy Pavalar	1,660	3.74	New
Independent	N. Ramachandran	567	1.28	New
Margin of victory		1,850	4.16	
Turnout		44,433	64.01	
Registered electors		69,411		
TTP win (new seat)				
