= C. Perumal =

Indian politician

C. Perumal (died 18 July 2013) was an Indian politician of the All India Anna Dravida Munnetra Kazhagam party and incumbent member of the Tamil Nadu Legislative Assembly from the Yercaud constituency. He also served as a Member of the Parliament of India representing Tamil Nadu in the Rajya Sabha, the upper house of the Indian Parliament. He died from cardiac arrest on 18 July 2013.
