= K. Rathamani =

Indian politician (died 2019)

K. Rathamani (died 14 June 2019) was an Indian politician.

Rathamani was born in Kalinjikuppam, a village of Villupuram district, to a family of farmers. He obtained a master's degree.

Rathamani contested his first Tamil Nadu Legislative Assembly election in 2011 and lost. He was elected from Vikravandi in 2016 as a member of the Dravida Munnetra Kazhagam, succeeding R. Ramamurthy. Rathamani was diagnosed with stomach cancer, for which he first sought treatment in Chennai. Rathamani continued treatment at the Jawaharlal Institute of Postgraduate Medical Education and Research Hospital for three months prior to his death on 14 June 2019.
