= K. Murugesan Anandan =

Indian politician

- Born: 12 December 1951 (age 74); Village Nathamur, District Vilupuram, (Tamil Nadu).
- Citizenship: India
- Education: Govt. Arts College, Cuddalore, Tamil Nadu.
- Occupations: Politician; Agriculturist; Social worker
- Years active: 1985 - date
- Political party: All India Anna Dravida Munnetra Kazhagam.
- Spouse: Mrs. M. Chitra.
- Children: 02
- Parent(s): Mr. Murugesan (father) & Mrs. M. Alamelammal (mother).

K. Murugesan Anandan is a member of the 15th Lok Sabha of India. He represented the Viluppuram constituency of Tamil Nadu and is a member of the All India Anna Dravida Munnetra Kazhagam political party.

Viluppuram constituency is reserved under Scheduled Caste category.

== Background ==
K. Murugesan Anandan is an undergraduate. An agriculturist by profession, he has held various offices since 1985.

== Posts held ==
He was elected to the Tamil Nadu legislative assembly as an Anna Dravida Munnetra Kazhagam candidate from Ulundurpet constituency in 1984, and 1991 elections.

#	From	To	Position
01	1985	1988	Member, Tamil Nadu Legislative Assembly
02	1991	1996	Member, Tamil Nadu Legislative Assembly
03	1991	1996	Cabinet Minister, Government of Tamil Nadu
04	2009	-	Member, 15th Lok Sabha
05	31 Aug 2009	-	Member, Committee on Labour
06	31 Aug 2009	-	Member, Consultative Committee, Ministry of Railways
07	1 May 2010	-	Member, Committee on the Welfare of Scheduled Castes and Scheduled Tribes

== See also ==
- List of members of the 15th Lok Sabha of India
