= L. Venkatesan =

Indian politician

L. Venkatesan is an Indian politician and former Member of the Tamil Nadu Legislative Assembly from the Tirukkoyilur constituency. He represents the Desiya Murpokku Dravidar Kazhagam party.
