= Results of the 2011 Tamil Nadu Legislative Assembly election =

The following is the detailed result of the 2011 Tamil Nadu Legislative Assembly election.

== Detailed result ==
=== Result by pre-poll alliance ===
Election map of results based on parties

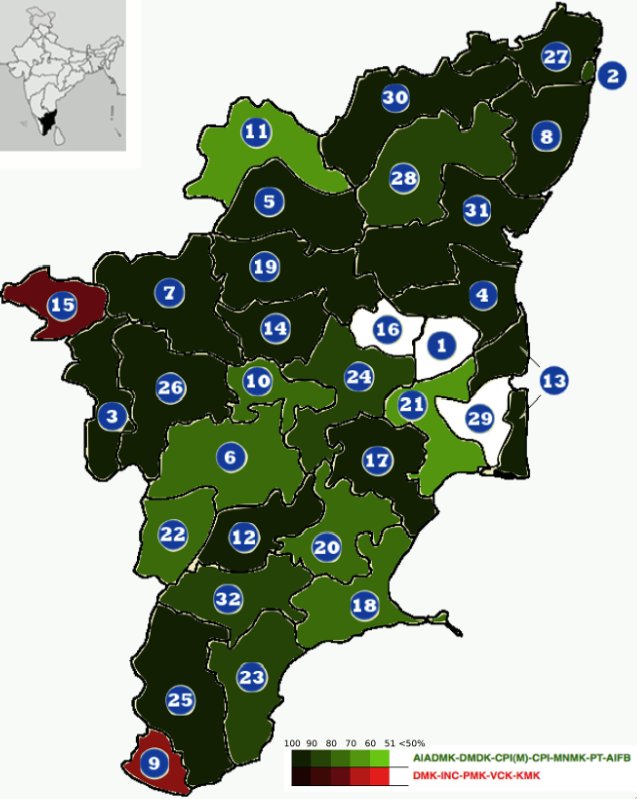
Election map based on % seats won by district

Summary of the 2011 April/May Assembly election result in Tamil Nadu
| Alliance/Party | Seats won | Change | Popular vote | Vote % | Adj. %^{‡} |
|---|---|---|---|---|---|
| AIADMK+ alliance | 203 | +130 | 19,085,762 | 51.9% | |
| AIADMK | 150 | +93 | 14,150,289 | 38.4% | 53.9% |
| DMDK | 29 | +28 | 2,903,828 | 7.9% | 44.8% |
| CPI(M) | 10 | +1 | 888,364 | 2.4% | 50.3% |
| CPI | 9 | +3 | 727,394 | 2.0% | 48.6% |
| MNMK | 2 | +2 | 181,180 | 0.5% | 42.4% |
| PT | 2 | +2 | 146,454 | 0.4% | 54.3% |
| AIFB | 1 | +1 | 88,253 | 0.2% | 51.2% |
| DMK+ alliance | 31 | -126 | 14,530,215 | 39.5% | |
| DMK | 23 | -77 | 8,249,991 | 22.4% | 42.1% |
| INC | 5 | -32 | 3,426,432 | 9.3% | 35.6% |
| PMK | 3 | -15 | 1,927,783 | 5.2% | 39.6% |
| VCK | 0 | -2 | 555,965 | 1.5% | 34.0% |
| KMK | 0 | – | 370,044 | 1.0% | 32.5% |
| Others | 0 | -4 | 3,137,137 | 8.5% | |
| BJP | 0 | – | 819,577 | 2.2% | 2.6% |
| MDMK^{†} | – | -3 | – | – | – |
| IND and others | 0 | -1 | 2,120,476 | 5.8% | N/A |
| Total | 234 | – | 36,845,373 | 100% | – |
| Valid votes | | | 36,845,373 | 99.89 | |
| Invalid votes | | | 40,853 | 0.11 | |
| Votes cast / turnout | | | 36,886,226 | 78.29 | |
| Abstentions | | | 10,229,620 | 21.71 | |
| Registered voters | | | 47,115,846 | | |

†: MDMK left the AIADMK alliance due to failed seat sharing talks and boycotted this election.
‡: Vote % reflects the percentage of votes the party received compared to the entire electorate that voted in this election. Adjusted (Adj.) Vote %, reflects the average % of votes the party received per constituency that they contested.
Sources: Election Commission of India and Hindu Newspaper

=== District wise result ===
| District | Valid Votes | AIADMK Seats | AIADMK+ Votes | DMK+ Seats | DMK+ Votes | % Margin |
| Thiruvallur | 1,826,318 | 10 | 993,372 | 0 | 691,827 | 16.51% |
| Chennai | 2,159,739 | 14 | 1,147,613 | 0 | 865,125 | 13.08% |
| Kancheepuram | 1,953,968 | 11 | 1,035,657 | 2 | 787,501 | 12.70% |
| Vellore | 1,987,978 | 11 | 983,917 | 2 | 823,274 | 8.08% |
| Krishnagiri | 957,981 | 4 | 457,970 | 2 | 375,596 | 8.60% |
| Dharmapuri | 805,797 | 5 | 406,133 | 0 | 310,342 | 11.89% |
| Tiruvanamalai | 1,364,293 | 7 | 700,961 | 1 | 578,005 | 9.01% |
| Villupuram | 1,834,117 | 10 | 978,176 | 1 | 726,947 | 13.70% |
| Salem | 1,902,139 | 11 | 1,060,778 | 0 | 717,181 | 18.06% |
| Namakkal | 955,666 | 6 | 514,264 | 0 | 363,337 | 15.79% |
| Erode | 1,232,970 | 8 | 680,999 | 0 | 435,548 | 19.91% |
| Tiruppur | 1,236,100 | 8 | 764,166 | 0 | 400,386 | 29.43% |
| Nilgiris | 357,675 | 1 | 153,112 | 2 | 182,233 | 8.14% |
| Coimbatore | 1,609,527 | 10 | 919,464 | 0 | 575,479 | 21.37% |
| Dindigul | 1,163,493 | 5 | 575,194 | 2 | 474,675 | 8.64% |
| Karur | 620,901 | 3 | 338,632 | 1 | 254,046 | 13.62% |
| Tiruchirapalli | 1,409,996 | 8 | 717,414 | 1 | 522,404 | 13.83% |
| Perambalur | 363,019 | 1 | 157,263 | 1 | 161,141 | 1.07% |
| Ariyalur | 365,730 | 1 | 166,327 | 1 | 163,645 | 0.73% |
| Cuddalore | 1,357,217 | 9 | 703,965 | 0 | 553,601 | 11.08% |
| Nagapattinam | 837,517 | 6 | 408,117 | 0 | 329,007 | 9.45% |
| Thiruvarur | 676,323 | 2 | 311,573 | 2 | 333,113 | 3.18% |
| Thanjavur | 1,249,876 | 5 | 593,422 | 3 | 525,731 | 5.42% |
| Pudukkottai | 802,019 | 6 | 413,601 | 0 | 298,574 | 14.34% |
| Sivaganga | 660,659 | 3 | 326,716 | 1 | 290,998 | 5.41% |
| Madurai | 1,577,037 | 10 | 901,916 | 0 | 571,730 | 20.94% |
| Theni | 664,213 | 3 | 331,782 | 1 | 287,372 | 6.69% |
| Virudhunagar | 1,037,071 | 6 | 538,509 | 1 | 433,726 | 10.10% |
| Ramanathapuram | 643,185 | 3 | 298,444 | 1 | 228,919 | 10.81% |
| Tuticorin | 825,262 | 5 | 443,909 | 1 | 323,031 | 14.65% |
| Tirunelveli | 1,503,752 | 9 | 760,477 | 1 | 586,390 | 11.58% |
| Kanniyakumari | 896,208 | 2 | 301,919 | 4 | 359,331 | 6.41% |

=== Results by constituency ===
Winner, runner-up, voter turnout, and victory margin in every constituency
| Assembly Constituency | | Turnout (%) | Winner | | | | Runner Up | | | | Margin | 3rd Place | | | |
| #k | Name | Turnout (%) | Candidate | Party | Votes | % | Candidate | Party | Votes | % | Margin | Candidate | Party | Votes | % |
|---|---|---|---|---|---|---|---|---|---|---|---|---|---|---|---|
| 1 | Gummidipoondi | 83.38 | Karthik M | DMDK | 97,708 | 54.4 | Sekar K N | PMK | 68,452 | 38.11 | 29,256 | Selvakumar R | IND | 1,892 | 1.05 |
| 2 | Ponneri | 80.44 | Pon. Raja | AIADMK | 93,624 | 57.5 | Manimekalai. A | DMK | 62,354 | 38.29 | 31,270 | Raja. S | BSP | 1,347 | 0.83 |
| 3 | Tiruttani | 80.79 | M. Arun Subramanian | DMDK | 95,918 | 50.16 | Raman.E.S.S. | INC | 71,988 | 37.64 | 23,930 | Subramani.A.K | JMK | 9,760 | 5.1 |
| 4 | Thiruvallur | 81.82 | B. V. Ramanaa | AIADMK | 91,337 | 53.69 | Shiaji E.A.P | DMK | 67,689 | 39.79 | 23,648 | James E | PB | 2,220 | 1.3 |
| 5 | Poonamallee | 79.12 | Manimaran R | AIADMK | 99,097 | 54.59 | Kanchi Gv Mathiazhagan | INC | 57,678 | 31.77 | 41,419 | Jaganmoorthy.M | PB | 21,118 | 11.63 |
| 6 | Avadi | 71.81 | S. Abdul Rahim | AIADMK | 110,102 | 55.18 | Dhamotharan.R | INC | 66,864 | 33.51 | 43,238 | Jayaraman.B. | IND | 10,460 | 5.24 |
| 7 | Maduravoyal | 68.99 | G. Beem Rao | CPI(M) | 96,844 | 52.09 | Selvam K | PMK | 72,833 | 39.17 | 24,011 | Selvan S | BJP | 6,381 | 3.43 |
| 8 | Ambattur | 70.36 | S. Vedachalam | AIADMK | 99,330 | 53.3 | Ranaganathan. B | DMK | 76,613 | 41.11 | 22,717 | Jeyachandra. T | BJP | 3,912 | 2.1 |
| 9 | Madavaram | 75.23 | V. Moorthy | AIADMK | 99,330 | 53.3 | Kanimozhi N S | DMK | 76,613 | 41.11 | 22,717 | Sivakumar B | BJP | 3,912 | 2.1 |
| 10 | Thiruvottiyur | 74.38 | K. Kuppan | AIADMK | 93,944 | 57.03 | Samy. K.P.P. | DMK | 66,653 | 40.47 | 27,291 | Venkatakrishnan. V. | BJP | 1,719 | 1.04 |
| 11 | Dr. Radhakrishnan Nagar | 72.72 | P. Vetrivelu* | AIADMK | 83,777 | 59.04 | Sekarbabu P K | DMK | 52,522 | 37.01 | 31,255 | Vinayagam K R | BJP | 1,300 | 0.92 |
| 12 | Perambur | 69.74 | Soundararajan A | CPI(M) | 84,668 | 52.26 | N.R.Dhanapalan | DMK | 67,245 | 41.5 | 17,423 | R.Ravindrakumar | BJP | 2,758 | 1.7 |
| 13 | Kolathur | 68.29 | M.K. Stalin | DMK | 68,677 | 48.35 | Sadai.Sa. Duraisamy | AIADMK | 65,943 | 46.43 | 2,734 | Armstrong K. | BSP | 4,004 | 2.82 |
| 14 | Villivakkam | 67.71 | Prabhakar Jcd | AIADMK | 68,612 | 52.44 | K. Anbazhagan | DMK | 57,830 | 44.2 | 10,782 | Masana Muthu D | BJP | 1,850 | 1.41 |
| 15 | Thiru-Vi-Ka-Nagar | 68.31 | Neelakandan. V | AIADMK | 72,887 | 58.87 | Natesan .C. Dr. | INC | 43,546 | 35.17 | 29,341 | Karunanidhi. E | BJP | 3,561 | 2.88 |
| 16 | Egmore | 67.98 | Nallathambi K | DMDK | 51,772 | 46.23 | Parithi Ellamvazhuthi | DMK | 51,570 | 46.05 | 202 | Kumaravadivel N.S | BJP | 4,911 | 4.38 |
| 17 | Royapuram | 70.58 | D. Jayakumar | AIADMK | 65,099 | 57.89 | Manohar. R | INC | 43,727 | 38.88 | 21,372 | Chandar (Alias) Chandru.D | BJP | 1,683 | 1.5 |
| 18 | Harbour | 63.14 | Karuppiah .Pala | AIADMK | 53,920 | 55.89 | Altaf Hussain | DMK | 33,603 | 34.83 | 20,317 | Jaisankar M | BJP | 4,663 | 4.83 |
| 19 | Chepauk-Thiruvallikeni | 69.32 | Anbazhagan. J | DMK | 64,191 | 49.44 | Thameemun Ansari. M | MMK | 54,988 | 42.35 | 9,203 | Venkataraman. S | BJP | 5,374 | 4.14 |
| 20 | Thousand Lights | 66.79 | Valarmathi. B | AIADMK | 67,522 | 50.55 | Hasan Mohamed Jinnah | DMK | 59,930 | 44.87 | 7,592 | Photo Siva Alias Sivalingam. M | BJP | 3,098 | 2.32 |
| 21 | Anna Nagar | 66.84 | Gokula Indira S | AIADMK | 88,954 | 58.67 | Arivazhagan V.K. | INC | 52,364 | 34.54 | 36,590 | Haribabu P.K. | BJP | 3,769 | 2.49 |
| 22 | Virugampakkam | 67.05 | Partha Sarathy B | DMDK | 71,524 | 49.65 | Thanasekaran K | DMK | 57,430 | 39.86 | 14,094 | Sritharan P | BJP | 7,525 | 5.22 |
| 23 | Saidapet | 70.49 | Senthamizhan G' | AIADMK | 79,856 | 51.78 | Magesh Kumaar M | DMK | 67,785 | 43.95 | 12,071 | Kalidass V | BJP | 3,018 | 1.96 |
| 24 | Thiyagarayanagar | 66.58 | Kalairajan V P | AIADMK | 75,883 | 58.48 | Chellakumar A | INC | 43,421 | 33.46 | 32,462 | Ravichandran K | BJP | 4,575 | 3.53 |
| 25 | Mylapore | 66.35 | Rajalakshmi R | AIADMK | 80,063 | 56.03 | K. V. Thangkabalu | INC | 50,859 | 35.6 | 29,204 | Vanathi Srinivasan | BJP | 6,911 | 4.84 |
| 26 | Velachery | 67.06 | Ashok M.K. | AIADMK | 82,145 | 53.91 | Jayaraman M | PMK | 50,425 | 33.1 | 31,720 | E. Sarathbabu | IND | 7,472 | 4.9 |
| 27 | Shozhinganallur | 67.27 | K.P. Kandan | AIADMK | 145,385 | 60.43 | S.S. Balaji | VCK | 78,413 | 32.59 | 66,972 | S. Mohandoss Gandhi | BJP | 7,275 | 3.02 |
| 28 | Alandur | 70.07 | S. Ramachandran | DMDK | 76,537 | 45.52 | Dr. K.Ghayathri Devi | INC | 70,783 | 42.1 | 5,754 | S. Sathya Narayanan | BJP | 9,628 | 5.73 |
| 29 | Sriperumbudur | 81.86 | R. Perumal | AIADMK | 101,751 | 59.07 | D. Yasodha | INC | 60,819 | 35.31 | 40,932 | C. Dhanasekaran | PB | 2,968 | 1.72 |
| 30 | Uthiramerur | 86.46 | P. Ganesan | AIADMK | 86,912 | 51.75 | Ponkumar | DMK | 73,146 | 43.55 | 13,766 | M. Mohanavelu | IND | 1,917 | 1.14 |
| 31 | Kancheepuram | 80.83 | V. Somasundaram | AIADMK | 102,710 | 53.43 | P. S. Ulagarakshagan | PMK | 76,993 | 40.05 | 25,717 | A. N. Radhakrishnan | AIPPMR | 2,806 | 1.46 |
| 32 | Pallavaram | 72.2 | P. Dhansingh | AIADMK | 105,631 | 52.7 | T.M. Anbarasan | DMK | 88,257 | 44.03 | 17,374 | R. Kumar | LSP | 1,082 | 0.54 |
| 33 | Tambaram | 69.9 | T. K. M. Chinneyah | AIADMK | 91,702 | 51.45 | S. R. Raja | DMK | 77,718 | 43.61 | 13,984 | A. Veda Subramaniam | BJP | 3,061 | 1.72 |
| 34 | Chengalpattu | 74.05 | D. Murugesan | DMDK | 83,297 | 44.58 | V. G. Rangasamy | PMK | 83,006 | 44.42 | 291 | M. Panneer Selvam | AIJMK | 4,124 | 2.21 |
| 35 | Thiruporur | 82.62 | K. Manoharan | AIADMK | 84,169 | 53.06 | K. Arumugam | PMK | 65,881 | 41.53 | 18,288 | G. Sivalingam | PB | 1,598 | 1.01 |
| 36 | Cheyyur | 81 | V. S . Raji | AIADMK | 78,307 | 55.59 | D. Parventhan | VCK | 51,723 | 36.72 | 26,584 | O. E. Sankar | PB | 2,322 | 1.65 |
| 37 | Maduranthakam | 81.86 | S. Kanitha | AIADMK | 79,256 | 53.64 | Dr. K. Jeyakumar | INC | 60,762 | 41.13 | 18,494 | C. Jaisankar | IND | 1,885 | 1.28 |
| 38 | Arakkonam | 78.84 | S.Ravi | AIADMK | 79,409 | 55.94 | S.Sellapandian | VCK | 53,172 | 37.46 | 26,237 | G.Mahalingam | PB | 3,007 | 2.12 |
| 39 | Sholingur | 84.72 | P.R.Manokar | DMDK | 69,963 | 38.98 | A.M.Muniratinam | IND | 60,925 | 33.94 | 9,038 | Arulanbarasu | INC | 36,957 | 20.59 |
| 40 | Ranipet | 79.41 | A.Mohammed John | AIADMK | 83,834 | 53.14 | Gandhi.R | DMK | 69,633 | 44.14 | 14,201 | R.Murugan | IND | 1,213 | 0.77 |
| 41 | Arcot | 83.2 | R. Srinivasan | AIADMK | 93,258 | 53.11 | K.L. Elavazagan | PMK | 74,005 | 42.14 | 19,253 | M. Velu | IND | 3,211 | 1.83 |
| 42 | Katpadi | 79.54 | Duraimurugan | DMK | 75,064 | 49.55 | Appu S.R.K.(A) Radhakrishnan.S. | AIADMK | 72,091 | 47.59 | 2,973 | Varadarajan.A | BJP | 1,539 | 1.02 |
| 43 | Vellore | 73.59 | Vijay.Dr.V.S. | AIADMK | 71,522 | 50.82 | Gnanasekaran.C. | INC | 56,346 | 40.04 | 15,176 | Hassan.J. | IND | 5,273 | 3.75 |
| 44 | Anaikattu | 78.06 | Kalaiarasu.M. | PMK | 80,233 | 54.51 | Velu.V.B. | DMDK | 52,330 | 35.55 | 27,903 | Dharman.M | MMKA | 4,696 | 3.19 |
| 45 | Kilvaithinankuppam | 80.03 | Thamizharasan.C.K | AIADMK | 72,002 | 51.12 | Seetharaman.K | DMK | 62,242 | 44.19 | 9,760 | Anumanthan.S | IND | 1,350 | 0.96 |
| 46 | Gudiyattam | 76.99 | K. Lingamuthu | CPI | 79,416 | 49.07 | K. Rajamarthandan. | DMK | 73,574 | 45.46 | 5,842 | C. Bharathi | IJK | 1,687 | 1.04 |
| 47 | Vaniyambadi | 78.8 | Sampath Kumar .Govi | AIADMK | 80,563 | 54.65 | Abdul Basith .H | DMK | 62,338 | 42.29 | 18,225 | Mohammed Iliyas | IND | 2,548 | 1.73 |
| 48 | Ambur | 77.7 | Aslam Basha.A | MMK | 60,361 | 44.01 | Vijay Elanchezian.J | INC | 55,270 | 40.3 | 5,091 | Sampath E | IND | 6,553 | 4.78 |
| 49 | Jolarpet | 81.64 | Veeramani. K.C. | AIADMK | 86,273 | 55.13 | Ponnusamy.G. | PMK | 63,337 | 40.47 | 22,936 | Annamalai.M | IND | 1,912 | 1.22 |
| 50 | Tirupattur (Vellore) | 82.4 | K.G.Ramesh | AIADMK | 82,895 | 55.31 | S.Rajendran | DMK | 61,103 | 40.77 | 21,792 | M. Selva Kumar | BJP | 1,087 | 0.73 |
| 51 | Uthangarai | 82.09 | Manoranjitham | AIADMK | 90,381 | 58.92 | Muniyammal | VCK | 51,223 | 33.39 | 39,158 | Vediyappan.S | IND | 4,134 | 2.7 |
| 52 | Bargur | 81.83 | K.E.Krishnamurthi | AIADMK | 88,711 | 56.02 | T.K.Raja | PMK | 59,271 | 37.43 | 29,440 | K.Asokan | BJP | 2,314 | 1.46 |
| 53 | Krishnagiri | 79.43 | K.P.Munusamy | AIADMK | 89,776 | 55.98 | Syed Ghiyas Ul Haq | INC | 60,679 | 37.83 | 29,097 | Kotteswaran | BJP | 3,025 | 1.89 |
| 54 | Veppanahalli | 85.33 | T.Senguttuvan | DMK | 71,471 | 45.09 | Kandan @ Murugesan.S.M | DMDK | 63,867 | 40.29 | 7,604 | V.Ranganathan | UMK | 8,943 | 5.64 |
| 55 | Hosur | 75 | K. Gopinath | INC | 65,034 | 37.79 | S. John Timothy | DMDK | 50,882 | 29.56 | 14,152 | S. A. Sathya | IND | 24,639 | 14.32 |
| 56 | Thalli | 84.2 | Ramachandran. T. | CPI | 74,353 | 47.9 | Prakaash. Y. | DMK | 67,918 | 43.75 | 6,435 | Narendiran. K.S. | BJP | 4,727 | 3.05 |
| 57 | Palacode | 86.72 | Anbalagan K P | AIADMK | 94,877 | 60.72 | Selvam V | PMK | 51,664 | 33.06 | 43,213 | Harinath K | IND | 2,449 | 1.57 |
| 58 | Pennagaram | 83.02 | Nanjappan N | CPI | 80,028 | 49.31 | Inbasekaran P N P | DMK | 68,485 | 42.2 | 11,543 | Munusamy M | IND | 3,047 | 1.88 |
| 59 | Dharmapuri | 77.92 | Baskar A | DMDK | 76,943 | 45.73 | Santhamoorthy P | PMK | 72,900 | 43.33 | 4,043 | Raja P S | IND | 6,937 | 4.12 |
| 60 | Pappireddippatti | 80.91 | Palaniappan P | AIADMK | 76,582 | 45.39 | Mullaiventhan V | DMK | 66,093 | 39.17 | 10,489 | Velu M | IND | 18,710 | 11.09 |
| 61 | Harur | 79.61 | Dillibabu P | CPI(M) | 77,703 | 51.71 | Nandhan B M | VCK | 51,200 | 34.07 | 26,503 | Parthiban P | IND | 5,290 | 3.52 |
| 62 | Chengam | 84.25 | Suresh@Sureshkumar.T | DMDK | 83,722 | 46.95 | Selvaperunthagai.K | INC | 72,225 | 40.5 | 11,497 | Sureshkumar.R | IND | 8,543 | 4.79 |
| 63 | Tiruvannamalai | 80.82 | Velu E.V | DMK | 84,802 | 49.4 | Ramachandran.S | AIADMK | 79,676 | 46.41 | 5,126 | Arjunan.A | BJP | 1,519 | 0.88 |
| 64 | Kilpennathur | 84.47 | Aranganathan.A.K | AIADMK | 83,663 | 48.2 | Pitchandi.K | DMK | 79,582 | 45.85 | 4,081 | Sridharan.D | IND | 2,301 | 1.33 |
| 65 | Kalasapakkam | 86.36 | T.Senguttuvan | AIADMK | 91,833 | 58.95 | Vijayakumar.P.S | INC | 53,599 | 34.4 | 38,234 | Vijayakumar.A | IND | 2,615 | 1.68 |
| 66 | Polur | 84.85 | Jayasudha.L | AIADMK | 92,391 | 55.42 | Edirolimanian.G | PMK | 63,846 | 38.3 | 28,545 | Perumal.V | IJK | 2,320 | 1.39 |
| 67 | Arani | 82.36 | Babu Murugavel.R.M | DMDK | 88,967 | 50.06 | Sivanandham.R | DMK | 81,001 | 45.58 | 7,966 | Gopi.P | BJP | 1,639 | 0.92 |
| 68 | Cheyyar | 84.9 | Subramanian.N | AIADMK | 96,180 | 53.67 | Vishnu Prasad.M.K. | INC | 70,717 | 39.46 | 25,463 | Viswanathan.D | IND | 3,022 | 1.69 |
| 69 | Vandavasi | 81.6 | Gunaseelan.V | AIADMK | 84,529 | 52.05 | Kamalakkannan.J | DMK | 72,233 | 44.48 | 12,296 | Devendiran.A | IND | 2,020 | 1.24 |
| 70 | Gingee | 81.63 | Ganesh Kumar.A | PMK | 77,026 | 44.15 | Sivalingam. R | DMDK | 75,215 | 43.12 | 1,811 | Sivamark.K | IND | 8,627 | 4.95 |
| 71 | Mailam | 82.47 | Nagarajan.P | AIADMK | 81,656 | 53.92 | Prakash.R | PMK | 61,575 | 40.66 | 20,081 | Elumalai.B | BJP | 1,844 | 1.22 |
| 72 | Tindivanam | 81.28 | Haridoss.D | AIADMK | 80,553 | 52.59 | Sankar M.P | PMK | 65,016 | 42.45 | 15,537 | Munusamy.M | IND | 2,071 | 1.35 |
| 73 | Vanur | 80.92 | Janakiraman.I | AIADMK | 88,834 | 55.99 | Pushparaj.S | DMK | 63,696 | 40.14 | 25,138 | Vetrivendan.D | BJP | 1,520 | 0.96 |
| 74 | Villupuram | 82.65 | Shanmugam.C.V | AIADMK | 90,304 | 52.18 | Ponmudy.K | DMK | 78,207 | 45.19 | 12,097 | Arokiyasamy.C | BJP | 1,100 | 0.64 |
| 75 | Vikravandi | 81.39 | Ramamurthy.R | CPI(M) | 78,656 | 51.72 | Rathamani.K | DMK | 63,759 | 41.93 | 14,897 | Ramamoorthi.K | IND | 2,442 | 1.61 |
| 76 | Tirukkoyilur | 80.51 | Venkatesan.L | DMDK | 78,229 | 49.18 | Thangam. M | DMK | 69,438 | 43.65 | 8,791 | Venkatesan.V | IND | 6,029 | 3.79 |
| 77 | Ulundurpettai | 83.41 | Kumaraguru.R | AIADMK | 114,794 | 60.09 | Mohamedyousuf.M | VCK | 61,286 | 32.08 | 53,508 | Chandirasekaran.N | IND | 3,642 | 1.91 |
| 78 | Rishivandiyam | 82.88 | Vijaykant | DMDK | 91,164 | 53.19 | Sivaraj.S | INC | 60,369 | 35.22 | 30,795 | Vijayakanth.M | IND | 7,355 | 4.29 |
| 79 | Sankarapuram | 81.8 | Mohan.P | AIADMK | 87,522 | 51.24 | Udhayasuriyan.T | DMK | 75,324 | 44.09 | 12,198 | Venkatesan.S | IND | 1,933 | 1.13 |
| 80 | Kallakurichi | 82.35 | K.Alaguvelu | AIADMK | 111,249 | 62.18 | A.C.Pavarasu | VCK | 51,251 | 28.65 | 59,998 | K.Natesan | IND | 4,031 | 2.25 |
| 81 | Gangavalli | 81.88 | Subha.R | DMDK | 72,922 | 48.6 | Chinnadurai.K | DMK | 59,457 | 39.63 | 13,465 | Manimaran.J | IND | 5,978 | |
| 82 | Attur | 80.52 | Madheswaran.S | AIADMK | 88,036 | 55.53 | Arthanari.S.K. | INC | 58,180 | 36.7 | 29,856 | Arulkumar.N | IJK | 2,993 | |
| 83 | Yercaud | 85.41 | Perumal.C | AIADMK | 104,221 | 58.06 | Tamilselvan.C. | DMK | 66,639 | 37.13 | 37,582 | Selvam.L. | IND | 2,437 | |
| 84 | Omalur | 82.6 | Krishnan.C | AIADMK | 112,102 | 59.7 | Tamizharasu.A | PMK | 65,558 | 34.91 | 46,544 | Sivaram.B | BJP | 2,139 | |
| 85 | Mettur | 76.94 | Parthiban.S.R. | DMDK | 75,672 | 44.62 | Mani.G.K. | PMK | 73,078 | 43.09 | 2,594 | Padmarajan.(Dr).K. | IND | 6,273 | |
| 86 | Edappadi | 85.45 | Palaniswami.K | AIADMK | 104,586 | 56.38 | Karthe.M | PMK | 69,848 | 37.66 | 34,738 | Venkatesan.M | IJK | 3,638 | |
| 87 | Sankari | 86.13 | Vijayalakshmi Palanisamy.P | AIADMK | 105,502 | 57.07 | Veerapandi S.Arumugam | DMK | 70,423 | 38.1 | 35,079 | Boopathy.M | IND | 1,194 | |
| 88 | Salem (West) | 79.92 | Venkatachalam.G | AIADMK | 95,935 | 56.5 | Rajendran.R | DMK | 68,274 | 40.21 | 27,661 | Elumalai.K.K. | BJP | 1,327 | |
| 89 | Salem (North) | 74.49 | Alagapuram R Mohanraj | DMDK | 88,956 | 54.46 | Jayaprakash G | INC | 59,591 | 36.48 | 29,365 | Chinnusamy C | UMK | 4,517 | |
| 90 | Salem (South) | 78.87 | Selvaraju.M.K. | AIADMK | 112,691 | 64.97 | Sivalingam.S.R. | DMK | 52,476 | 30.25 | 60,215 | Annadurai.N | BJP | 2,377 | |
| 91 | Veerapandi | 89.13 | Selvam.S.K | AIADMK | 100,155 | 55.73 | Rajendran.A. | DMK | 73,657 | 40.98 | 26,498 | Vaithi.M | IND | 1,558 | |
| 92 | Rasipuram | 83.36 | Dhanapal.P | AIADMK | 90,186 | 55.6 | Duraisamy.V.P | DMK | 65,469 | 40.36 | 24,717 | Murugan.L | BJP | 1,730 | 1.07 |
| 93 | Senthamangalam | 81.59 | Santhi.R | DMDK | 76,637 | 47.51 | Ponnusamy.K | DMK | 68,132 | 42.24 | 8,505 | Santhi.T | IND | 5,208 | 3.23 |
| 94 | Namakkal | 82.06 | Baskar.K.P.P. | AIADMK | 95,579 | 56.34 | Devarasan.R. | KMK | 59,724 | 35.2 | 35,855 | Sathyamoorthy.C. | IJK | 2,996 | 1.77 |
| 95 | Paramathi Velur | 81.26 | Thaniyarasu.U | AIADMK | 82,682 | 54.5 | Vadivel.C | PMK | 51,664 | 34.06 | 31,018 | Vaithiyanathan.V | IND | 6,233 | 4.11 |
| 96 | Tiruchengodu | 82.03 | Sampathkumar. P | DMDK | 78,103 | 52.12 | Sundaram. M.R. | INC | 54,158 | 36.14 | 23,945 | Selvaraj .S | IND | 3,809 | 2.54 |
| 97 | Kumarapalayam | 86.33 | Thangamani.P | AIADMK | 91,077 | 56.59 | Selvaraju.G | DMK | 64,190 | 39.88 | 26,887 | Balamurugan.K.S | BJP | 1,600 | 0.99 |
| 98 | Erode (East) | 77.58 | Chandhirakumar V.C | DMDK | 69,166 | 50.83 | Muthusamy S | DMK | 58,522 | 43.01 | 10,644 | Rajeshkumar P | BJP | 3,244 | 2.38 |
| 99 | Erode (West) | 79.28 | Ramalingam K.V | AIADMK | 90,789 | 59.29 | Yuvaraja M | INC | 52,921 | 34.56 | 37,868 | Palanisamy N.P | BJP | 3,516 | 2.3 |
| 100 | Modakkurichi | 81.51 | Kittusamy R.N | AIADMK | 87,705 | 57.29 | Palanisami R.M | INC | 47,543 | 31.06 | 40,162 | Kathirvel T | BJP | 8,376 | 5.47 |
| 101 | Perundurai | 83.9 | Venkatachalam.N.D | AIADMK | 89,960 | 60.15 | KKC Balu | KMK | 47,793 | 31.96 | 42,167 | Anbazhagan.G | BSP | 2,033 | 1.36 |
| 102 | Bhavani | 81.82 | Narayanan.P.G | AIADMK | 87,121 | 54.28 | Mahendran.K.S | PMK | 59,080 | 36.81 | 28,041 | Shithi Vinayagan.K.A | BJP | 3,432 | 2.14 |
| 103 | Anthiyur | 82.29 | Ramanitharan.S.S | AIADMK | 78,496 | 54.92 | Raaja.N.K.K.P | DMK | 53,242 | 37.25 | 25,254 | Pongiyia Gounder.K | IND | 2,269 | 1.59 |
| 104 | Gobichettipalayam | 83.33 | Sengottaiyan K.A | AIADMK | 94,872 | 54.47 | Sivaraj.N.S | KMK | 52,960 | 30.4 | 41,912 | Venkatachalam C.S | IND | 10,095 | 5.8 |
| 105 | Bhavanisagar | 81.96 | Sundaram P.L | CPI | 82,890 | 50.69 | Logeswari R | DMK | 63,487 | 38.83 | 19,403 | Palaniswami R | BJP | 4,440 | 2.72 |
| 106 | Dharapuram | 79.09 | Ponnusamy.K | AIADMK | 83,856 | 51.68 | Jayanthi.R | DMK | 68,831 | 42.42 | 15,025 | Karunakaran.P | BJP | 3,353 | 2.07 |
| 107 | Kangayam | 81.79 | Nataraj.Nsn | AIADMK | 96,005 | 60.63 | Videyal Sekar.S. | INC | 54,240 | 34.26 | 41,765 | Ponnusamy.C. | BJP | 1,884 | 1.19 |
| 108 | Avanashi | 73.07 | A. A. Karuppasamy | AIADMK | 103,002 | 66.60 | Natarajan. A. R. | INC | 41,591 | 26.89 | 61,411 | Alwas.M | BJP | 3,040 | 2.51 |
| 109 | Tiruppur (North) | 74.39 | Anandan.M.S.M | AIADMK | 113,640 | 70.62 | Govindasamy. C | DMK | 40,369 | 25.09 | 73,271 | Parthiban A | BJP | 3,009 | 1.87 |
| 110 | Tiruppur (South) | 72.88 | Thangavel.K | CPI(M) | 75,424 | 61.63 | Senthilkumar K | INC | 37,121 | 30.33 | 38,303 | Pointmani N | BJP | 4,397 | 3.59 |
| 111 | Palladam | 77.38 | Paramasivam.K.P | AIADMK | 118,140 | 66.78 | Balasubramanian.K | KMK | 48,364 | 27.34 | 69,776 | Shanmuga Sundaram.M | BJP | 4,423 | 2.5 |
| 112 | Udumalaipettai | 78.25 | Pollachi Jayaraman. V | AIADMK | 95,477 | 60.87 | Ilamparrithi. T | KMK | 50,917 | 32.46 | 44,560 | Viswanathan. M | BJP | 3,817 | 2.43 |
| 113 | Madathukulam | 81.49 | C.Shanmugavelu | AIADMK | 78,622 | 54.71 | M.P. Saminathan | DMK | 58,953 | 41.02 | 19,669 | D.Varadharajan | IND | 1,742 | 1.21 |
| 114 | Udhagamandalam | 71.29 | Budhichandhiran | AIADMK | 61,605 | 50.22 | Ganesh.R | INC | 54,060 | 44.07 | 7,545 | Kumaran.B | BJP | 2,716 | 2.21 |
| 115 | Gudalur | 71.51 | Thiravidamani.M | DMK | 66,871 | 58.67 | Selvaraj.S | DMDK | 39,497 | 34.65 | 27,374 | Anbarasan.D | BJP | 3,741 | 3.28 |
| 116 | Coonoor | 73.07 | Ramachandran.K | DMK | 61,302 | 50.66 | Bellie.A | CPI | 52,010 | 42.98 | 9,292 | Alwas.M | BJP | 3,040 | 2.51 |
| 117 | Mettupalayam | 81.13 | Chinnaraj O K | AIADMK | 93,700 | 54.53 | Arunkumar B | DMK | 67,925 | 39.53 | 25,775 | Nandhakumar K R | BJP | 5,647 | 3.29 |
| 118 | Sulur | 80.16 | Thinakaran K | DMDK | 88,680 | 52.29 | Eswaran E R | KMK | 59,148 | 34.88 | 29,532 | Dhinakaran K | IND | 7,285 | 4.3 |
| 119 | Kavundampalayam | 73.58 | Arukutty V C | AIADMK | 137,058 | 63.22 | Subramanian T P | DMK | 67,798 | 31.27 | 69,260 | Nandakumar R | BJP | 6,175 | 2.85 |
| 120 | Coimbatore (North) | 69.99 | Malaravan T. | AIADMK | 93,276 | 60.07 | Veeragopal M. | DMK | 53,178 | 34.25 | 40,098 | Subbian G.M. | BJP | 4,910 | 3.16 |
| 121 | Thondamuthur | 75.09 | Velumani S P | AIADMK | 99,886 | 62.4 | Kandaswamy M N | INC | 46,683 | 29.16 | 53,203 | Shridhar Murthy A | BJP | 5,581 | 3.49 |
| 122 | Coimbatore (South) | 71.55 | Doraiswamy R Alias Challenger Dorai | AIADMK | 80,637 | 56.27 | Pongalur Palanisamy N | DMK | 52,841 | 36.88 | 27,796 | Nandha Kumar C R | BJP | 5,177 | 3.61 |
| 123 | Singanallur | 68.98 | Chinnasamy R | AIADMK | 89,487 | 56.32 | Mayura S Jayakumar | INC | 55,161 | 34.71 | 34,326 | Rajendran R | BJP | 8,142 | 5.12 |
| 124 | Kinathukadavu | 78.07 | Damodaran S | AIADMK | 94,123 | 59.17 | M.Kannappan | DMK | 63,857 | 38.11 | 30,266 | Dharmalingam K | BJP | 4,587 | 2.74 |
| 125 | Pollachi | 80.06 | Muthukaruppannasamy M K | AIADMK | 81,446 | 57.46 | Nithyanandhan. K | KMK | 51,138 | 36.08 | 30,308 | Ragunathan V K | BJP | 3,909 | 2.76 |
| 126 | Valparai | 76.74 | Arumugham M | CPI | 61,171 | 49.16 | Kovaithangam | INC | 57,750 | 46.41 | 3,421 | Murugesan P | BJP | 2,273 | 1.83 |
| 127 | Palani | 80.97 | Venugopalu. K.S.N, | AIADMK | 82,051 | 48.3 | Senthilkumar. I.P | DMK | 80,297 | 47.27 | 1,754 | Deenadayalan, K | BJP | 1,745 | 1.03 |
| 128 | Oddanchatram | 86.13 | Sakkarapani.R | DMK | 87,743 | 51.99 | Baalasubramani. P | AIADMK | 72,810 | 43.14 | 14,933 | Velkumar.P, | IND | 3,092 | 1.83 |
| 129 | Athoor | 83.42 | Periyasamy.I | DMK | 112,751 | 59.58 | Balasubramani.S | DMDK | 58,819 | 31.08 | 53,932 | Balasubramani. S, | IND | 6,685 | 3.53 |
| 130 | Nilakottai | 78.87 | Ramasamy.A | PT | 75,124 | 52.45 | Rajangam.K. | INC | 50,410 | 35.19 | 24,714 | Johnpandian.B | TMMK | 6,882 | 4.8 |
| 131 | Natham | 84.95 | Viswanathan.R. | AIADMK | 94,947 | 53.87 | Vijayan.K | DMK | 41,858 | 23.75 | 53,089 | Andi Ambalam.M.A | IND | 29,834 | 16.93 |
| 132 | Dindigul | 76.79 | Balabharathi.K. | CPI(M) | 86,932 | 58.82 | Paul Baskar .J | PMK | 47,817 | 32.35 | 39,115 | Bose. P.G. | BJP | 5,761 | 3.9 |
| 133 | Vedasandur | 79.68 | Palanichamy. S. | AIADMK | 104,511 | 61.92 | Dhandapani. M. | INC | 53,799 | 31.88 | 50,712 | Varatharaj. P | IND | 2,018 | 1.2 |
| 134 | Aravakurichi | 85.94 | Pallanishamy.K.C | DMK | 72,831 | 49.71 | Senthilnathan.V | AIADMK | 68,290 | 46.61 | 4,541 | Vijayakumar.R | IND | 1,530 | 1.04 |
| 135 | Karur | 83.93 | Senthil Balaji, V. | AIADMK | 99,738 | 61.18 | Jothi Mani, S. | INC | 55,593 | 34.1 | 44,145 | Sivamani, S. | BJP | 2,417 | 1.48 |
| 136 | Krishnarayapuram | 86.73 | Kamaraj.S | AIADMK | 83,145 | 54.81 | Kamaraj.P | DMK | 60,636 | 39.97 | 22,509 | Senthilkumar.V | IND | 2,300 | 1.52 |
| 137 | Kulithalai | 78.07 | Damodaran S | AIADMK | 94,123 | 59.17 | M.Kannappan | DMK | 63,857 | 38.11 | 30,266 | Dharmalingam K | BJP | 4,587 | 2.74 |
| 138 | Manapaarai | 80.05 | Chandra Sekar R | AIADMK | 81,020 | 46.77 | Ponnusamy K | IND | 52,721 | 30.43 | 28,299 | Subbha Somu | INC | 26,629 | 15.37 |
| 139 | Srirangam | 80.74 | J Jayalalithaa | AIADMK | 105,328 | 58.99 | N Anand | DMK | 63,480 | 35.55 | 41,848 | Arivalagon K.A.S | BJP | 2,017 | 1.13 |
| 140 | Tiruchirappalli (West) | 75.04 | N.Mariam Pitchai | AIADMK | 77,492 | 50.21 | K.N.Nehru | DMK | 70,313 | 45.56 | 7,179 | R.Thirumalai | BJP | 2,569 | 1.66 |
| 141 | Tiruchirappalli (East) | 75.38 | Manoharan R | AIADMK | 83,046 | 54.84 | Anbil Periyasamy | DMK | 62,420 | 41.22 | 20,626 | Parthiban P | BJP | 3,170 | 2.09 |
| 142 | Thiruverumbur | 71.9 | S.Senthilkumar | DMDK | 71,356 | 47.4 | K.N.Seharan | DMK | 67,151 | 44.61 | 4,205 | A.Edwin Jerald | IJK | 3,688 | 2.45 |
| 143 | Lalgudi | 83.46 | Soundarapandian.A | DMK | 65,363 | 44.71 | Sendhureswaran.A.D | DMDK | 58,208 | 39.81 | 7,155 | Parkkavan Pachamuthu.P | IJK | 14,004 | 9.58 |
| 144 | Manachanallur | 84.06 | Poonachi. T.P. | AIADMK | 83,105 | 53.12 | Selvaraj. N | DMK | 63,915 | 40.86 | 19,190 | Subramaniam. M | BJP | 4,127 | 2.64 |
| 145 | Musiri | 81.55 | N.R.Sivapathy | AIADMK | 82,631 | 54.79 | M.Rajasekharan | INC | 38,840 | 25.75 | 43,791 | K. Kanniyan | IND | 19,193 | 12.73 |
| 146 | Thuraiyur | 82.02 | Indraganthi T | AIADMK | 75,228 | 50.67 | Parimala Devi S | DMK | 64,293 | 43.31 | 10,935 | S.Rengaraji | BJP | 1,828 | 1.23 |
| 147 | Perambalur | 82.62 | Tamizhselvan.R | AIADMK | 98,497 | 52.19 | Prabhaharan.M | DMK | 79,418 | 42.08 | 19,079 | Jayabalaji.J | IJK | 3,668 | 1.94 |
| 148 | Kunnam | 82.91 | Sivasankar.S.S | DMK | 81,723 | 46.89 | Durai.Kamaraj | DMDK | 58,766 | 33.72 | 22,957 | Jayaseelan.P | IJK | 13,735 | 7.88 |
| 149 | Ariyalur | 84.82 | Manivel, Durai. | AIADMK | 88,726 | 47.77 | Amaramoorthy D | INC | 70,906 | 38.17 | 17,820 | Baskar C | IJK | 9,501 | 5.11 |
| 150 | Jayankondam | 83.24 | Guru @ Gurunathan J | PMK | 92,739 | 51.53 | Elavazhagan P | AIADMK | 77,601 | 43.12 | 15,138 | Krishnamoorthy S | BJP | 1,775 | 0.99 |
| 151 | Tittakudi | 79.24 | K.Tamil Azhagan | DMDK | 61,897 | 44.45 | M.Sinthanaiselvan | VCK | 49,255 | 35.37 | 12,642 | P.Palaniammal | IND | 8,577 | 6.16 |
| 152 | Vriddhachalam | 80.8 | V. Muthukumar | DMDK | 72,902 | 46.06 | T. Neethirajan | INC | 59,261 | 37.44 | 13,641 | R. Krishnamoorthy | IJK | 11,214 | 7.08 |
| 153 | Neyveli | 82.7 | M.P.S.Sivasubramaniyan | AIADMK | 69,549 | 50.63 | T.Velmurugan | PMK | 61,431 | 44.72 | 8,118 | M.Karpagam | BJP | 1,406 | 1.02 |
| 154 | Panruti | 83.25 | P.Sivakolunthu | DMDK | 82,187 | 50.91 | Saba.Rajendran | DMK | 71,471 | 44.27 | 10,716 | R.Sankar | IJK | 1,570 | 0.97 |
| 155 | Cuddalore | 78.02 | M.C. Sampath | AIADMK | 85,953 | 60.56 | E.Pugazhendi | DMK | 52,275 | 36.83 | 33,678 | R. Gunasekaran | BJP | 1,579 | 1.11 |
| 156 | Kurinjipadi | 86.14 | R.Rajendran | AIADMK | 88,345 | 56.38 | M.R.K.Panneerselvam | DMK | 64,497 | 41.16 | 23,848 | R.Panneerselvam | IND | 1,863 | 1.19 |
| 157 | Bhuvanagiri | 82.03 | Selvi.R | AIADMK | 87,413 | 51.34 | T.Arivuselvan | PMK | 74,296 | 43.64 | 13,117 | K. Murugavel | IND | 2,511 | 1.47 |
| 158 | Chidambaram | 77.92 | K.Balakrishnan | CPI(M) | 72,054 | 48.3 | Sridhar Vandaiyar | DMK | 69,175 | 46.37 | 2,879 | V.Kannan | BJP | 4,034 | 2.7 |
| 159 | Kattumannarkoil | 79.52 | N.Murugumaran | AIADMK | 83,665 | 57.79 | D.Ravikumar | VCK | 51,940 | 35.88 | 31,725 | L.E.Nandhakumar | IND | 2,330 | 1.61 |
| 160 | Sirkazhi | 78.82 | Sakthi . M | AIADMK | 83,881 | 54.62 | Durairajan .P | VCK | 56,502 | 36.79 | 27,379 | Kalaivani . P | IND | 4,018 | 2.62 |
| 161 | Mayiladuthurai | 76.68 | R.Arulselvan | DMDK | 63,326 | 44.64 | S. Rajakumar | INC | 60,309 | 42.52 | 3,017 | B. Manimaran | IND | 6,023 | 4.25 |
| 162 | Poompuhar | 79.89 | Pavunraj.S | AIADMK | 85,839 | 50.66 | Agoram.K | PMK | 74,466 | 43.94 | 11,373 | Mohamed Tharik .M .Y | SDPI | 2,984 | 1.76 |
| 163 | Nagapattinam | 79.46 | K A Jayapal | AIADMK | 61,870 | 51.26 | Mohamed Sheik Dawood | DMK | 56,127 | 46.51 | 5,743 | M Muruganantham | BJP | 1,972 | 1.63 |
| 164 | Kilvelur | 85.88 | Mahalingam P | CPI(M) | 59,402 | 48.99 | Mathivanan U | DMK | 58,678 | 48.39 | 724 | Devaki G | IND | 1,487 | 1.23 |
| 165 | Vedaranyam | 84.29 | N.V.Kamaraj | AIADMK | 53,799 | 41.16 | S.K.Vedarathinam | IND | 42,871 | 32.8 | 10,928 | R.Chinnathurai | PMK | 22,925 | 17.54 |
| 166 | Thiruthuraipoondi | 80.63 | K.Ulaganathan | CPI | 83,399 | 53.36 | P.Selvadurai | INC | 61,112 | 39.1 | 22,287 | P.Sivashanmugam | BJP | 3,025 | 1.94 |
| 167 | Mannargudi | 80.86 | Rajaa, T.R.B. | DMK | 81,320 | 48.93 | Rajamanickam, Siva. | AIADMK | 77,338 | 46.54 | 3,982 | Jayachandran, M. | IND | 1,863 | 1.12 |
| 168 | Thiruvarur | 82.64 | Karunanidhi. M | DMK | 109,014 | 62.96 | Rajendran. M | AIADMK | 58,765 | 33.94 | 50,249 | Sriramachandran Pn | IND | 1,741 | 1.01 |
| 169 | Nannilam | 82.55 | Kamaraj.R | AIADMK | 92,071 | 50.96 | Elangovan.R | DMK | 81,667 | 45.2 | 10,404 | Ganesan.G | IJK | 2,835 | 1.57 |
| 170 | Thiruvidaimarudur | 81.56 | Chezhiaan.Govi | DMK | 77,175 | 48.12 | Pandiyarajan.T | AIADMK | 76,781 | 47.87 | 394 | Kudanthai Arasan | IND | 1,646 | 1.03 |
| 171 | Kumbakonam | 80.55 | Anbalagan.G | DMK | 78,642 | 48.72 | Eramanathan.Rama | AIADMK | 77,370 | 47.93 | 1,272 | Annamalai.Pl | BJP | 1,606 | 0.99 |
| 172 | Papanasam | 80.81 | R. Doraikkannu | AIADMK | 85,635 | 53.47 | M. Ramkumar | INC | 67,628 | 42.22 | 18,007 | T.Mahendren | BJP | 1,596 | 1 |
| 173 | Thiruvaiyaru | 83.78 | M.Rethinasami | AIADMK | 88,784 | 51.11 | S. Aranganathan | DMK | 75,822 | 43.65 | 12,962 | G. Muthukumar | IJK | 4,879 | 2.81 |
| 174 | Thanjavur | 73.83 | M.Rengasamy | AIADMK | 75,415 | 50.57 | S.N.M.Ubayadullah | DMK | 68,086 | 45.66 | 7,329 | M.S.Ramalingam | BJP | 1,901 | 1.27 |
| 175 | Orathanadu | 82.11 | R.Vaithilingam | AIADMK | 91,724 | 57.8 | T.Mahesh Krishanasamy | DMK | 59,080 | 37.23 | 32,644 | A. Arokiyasamy | IJK | 1,843 | 1.16 |
| 176 | Pattukkottai | 78 | N.R.Rengarajan | INC | 55,482 | 37.91 | N.Senthilkumar, | DMDK | 46,703 | 31.91 | 8,779 | A.R.M.Yoganandam | IND | 22,066 | 15.08 |
| 177 | Peravurani | 80.81 | C. Arunpandian | DMDK | 51,010 | 36.42 | K. Mahendran | INC | 43,816 | 31.29 | 7,194 | S.V. Thirugnana Sambandam | IND | 25,137 | 17.95 |
| 178 | Gandharvakottai | 80.14 | Subramanian. N | AIADMK | 67,128 | 54.85 | Kavithaipithan. S | DMK | 47,429 | 38.76 | 19,699 | Selvarani. R | IJK | 2,974 | 2.43 |
| 179 | Viralimalai | 86.02 | Vijaya Basker. C | AIADMK | 77,285 | 55.99 | Regupathy. S | DMK | 37,976 | 27.51 | 39,309 | Palaniappan. M | IND | 15,397 | 11.16 |
| 180 | Pudukkottai | 78.89 | Muthukumaran.P | CPI | 65,466 | 46.78 | Periyannan Arassu | DMK | 62,365 | 44.56 | 3,101 | Srinivasan. N | IJK | 4,098 | 2.93 |
| 181 | Thirumayam | 78.74 | Vairamuthu. P.K. | AIADMK | 78,913 | 58.27 | Subburam. Rm. | INC | 47,778 | 35.28 | 31,135 | Vadamalai .P | BJP | 2,686 | 1.98 |
| 182 | Alangudi | 81.93 | Krishnan.Kupa | AIADMK | 57,250 | 41.42 | Arulmani.S | PMK | 52,123 | 37.71 | 5,127 | Rajapandiyan.A.V | IND | 21,717 | 15.71 |
| 183 | Aranthangi | 75.06 | Raja Nayagam M | AIADMK | 67,559 | 52.77 | Thirunavukkarasar Su | INC | 50,903 | 39.76 | 16,656 | Shariff Km | IND | 2,729 | 2.13 |
| 184 | Karaikudi | 74.38 | Palanichamy.Cholan.Ct | AIADMK | 86,104 | 51.01 | Ramasamy.Kr | INC | 67,204 | 39.81 | 18,900 | Chidambaram.V | BJP | 4,194 | 2.48 |
| 185 | Tiruppattur (Sivaganga) | 79.2 | Periyakaruppan.Kr | DMK | 83,485 | 48.25 | Raja Kannappan.Rs | AIADMK | 81,901 | 47.34 | 1,584 | Manickavalli.M | IND | 1,289 | 0.75 |
| 186 | Sivaganga | 73.46 | Gunasekaran.S | CPI | 75,176 | 47.82 | Rajasekaran.V | INC | 70,794 | 45.03 | 4,382 | Rajendran.P.M | BJP | 2,957 | 1.88 |
| 187 | Manamadurai | 76.62 | Gunasekaran.M | AIADMK | 83,535 | 51.68 | Tamilarasi.A | DMK | 69,515 | 43.01 | 14,020 | Murugavelrajan.K | BSP | 2,883 | 1.78 |
| 188 | Melur | 77.55 | Samy R | AIADMK | 85,869 | 55.74 | Rani R | DMK | 61,407 | 39.86 | 24,462 | Dharmalingam P V | BJP | 1,608 | 1.04 |
| 189 | Madurai East | 77.18 | Tamilarasan K | AIADMK | 99,447 | 55.29 | Moorthy P | DMK | 70,692 | 39.3 | 28,755 | Srinivasan K | BJP | 2,677 | 1.49 |
| 190 | Sholavandan | 82.66 | Karuppiah M V | AIADMK | 86,376 | 59.84 | Ilanseliyan M | PMK | 49,768 | 34.48 | 36,608 | Palanivelswamy S | BJP | 2,002 | 1.39 |
| 191 | Madurai North | 72.87 | Bose.A.K | AIADMK | 90,706 | 63.62 | Rajendran.K.S.K | INC | 44,306 | 31.08 | 46,400 | Kumaralingam.M | BJP | 3,505 | 2.46 |
| 192 | Madurai South | 75.79 | Annadurai R | CPI(M) | 83,441 | 61.59 | Varadharajan S P | INC | 37,990 | 28.04 | 45,451 | Anuppanadi Jeya K | IND | 6,243 | 4.61 |
| 193 | Madurai Central | 74.76 | Sundarrajan R | DMDK | 76,063 | 52.77 | Syed Ghouse Basha S | DMK | 56,503 | 39.2 | 19,560 | Sasikumar A | BJP | 3,708 | 2.57 |
| 194 | Madurai West | 74.13 | Raju K | AIADMK | 94,798 | 59.64 | Thalapathi G | DMK | 56,037 | 35.25 | 38,761 | Rajarathinam M | BJP | 3,149 | 1.98 |
| 195 | Thiruparankundram | 76.08 | Raja A.K.T | DMDK | 95,469 | 58.7 | Sundararajan C R | INC | 46,967 | 28.88 | 48,502 | Arumugam G | IND | 9,793 | 6.02 |
| 196 | Tirumangalam | 81.63 | Muthuramalingam M | AIADMK | 101,494 | 55.55 | Manimaran M | DMK | 75,127 | 41.12 | 26,367 | Jayapandi P | IND | 1,469 | 0.8 |
| 197 | Usilampatti | 79.31 | Kathiravan P V | AIFB | 88,253 | 51.22 | Ramasamy S O | DMK | 72,933 | 42.33 | 15,320 | Kannan C | IND | 3,354 | 1.95 |
| 198 | Andipatti | 81.61 | Thangatamilselvan | AIADMK | 91,721 | 53.75 | Mookaiah.L | DMK | 70,690 | 41.42 | 21,031 | Kumar.R | BJP | 1,660 | 0.97 |
| 199 | Periyakulam | 78.89 | Laser.A | CPI(M) | 76,687 | 47.86 | Anbazhagan.V | DMK | 71,046 | 44.34 | 5,641 | Ganapathy.M | BJP | 3,422 | 2.14 |
| 200 | Bodinayakanur | 81 | Panneerselvam O | AIADMK | 95,235 | 56.69 | Lakshmanan S | DMK | 65,329 | 38.89 | 29,906 | Veerasamy S N | BJP | 1,598 | 0.95 |
| 201 | Cumbum | 76.22 | Eramakrishnan.N | DMK | 80,307 | 48.58 | Murugesan.P | DMDK | 68,139 | 41.22 | 12,168 | Abbas Mandhiri.R | IND | 6,205 | 3.75 |
| 202 | Rajapalayam | 80.24 | K.Gopalsamy | AIADMK | 80,125 | 53.8 | S.Thangapandian | DMK | 58,693 | 39.41 | 21,432 | N.S.Ramakrishnan | BJP | 5,428 | 3.64 |
| 203 | Srivilliputhur | 80.03 | V. Ponnupandi | CPI | 73,485 | 47.79 | R.V.K.Durai | DMK | 67,257 | 43.74 | 6,228 | S. Chinnapparaj | IND | 5,720 | 3.72 |
| 204 | Sattur | 81.93 | Krishnan.Kupa | AIADMK | 57,250 | 41.42 | Arulmani.S | PMK | 52,123 | 37.71 | 5,127 | Rajapandiyan.A.V | IND | 21,717 | 15.71 |
| 205 | Sivakasi | 81.05 | Rajenthra Bhalaji.K.T | AIADMK | 87,333 | 59.17 | Vanaraja .T | DMK | 51,679 | 35.01 | 35,654 | Meera Devi.P | BJP | 4,198 | 2.84 |
| 206 | Virudhunagar | 79.02 | Pandiarajan.K | DMDK | 70,441 | 52.36 | Armstrongnaveen.T. | INC | 49,003 | 36.42 | 21,438 | Karkuvelmariselvam.S | IND | 5,652 | 4.2 |
| 207 | Aruppukkottai | 83.35 | Vaigaichelvan | AIADMK | 76,546 | 51.15 | Ramachandran. K.K.S.S.R | DMK | 65,908 | 44.05 | 10,638 | Vetrivel. R | BJP | 1,966 | 1.31 |
| 208 | Tiruchuli | 84.5 | Thangam Thenarasu | DMK | 81,613 | 54.36 | Esakki Muthu | AIADMK | 61,661 | 41.07 | 19,952 | Vijaya Ragunathan.P. | BJP | 1,998 | 1.33 |
| 209 | Paramakudi | 72.43 | Sundararaj.S (Dr) | AIADMK | 86,150 | 57.88 | Ramprabu.R | INC | 51,544 | 34.63 | 34,606 | Nagarajan.Suba | BJP | 4,787 | 3.22 |
| 210 | Tiruvadanai | 71.61 | Thangavelan Suba | DMK | 64,165 | 41.11 | Mujupur Rahman S | DMDK | 63,238 | 40.52 | 927 | Pandivelu U | IND | 6,667 | 4.27 |
| 211 | Ramanathapuram | 71.05 | M. H. Jawahirullah | MMK | 65,831 | 40.96 | Hasan Ali K | INC | 50,074 | 31.16 | 15,757 | Kannan D | BJP | 28,060 | 17.46 |
| 212 | Mudhukulathur | 69.06 | Murugan M | AIADMK | 83,225 | 46.87 | Sathiamoorthy V | DMK | 63,136 | 35.56 | 20,089 | Johnpandian B | TMMK | 21,701 | 12.22 |
| 213 | Vilathikulam | 76.01 | Markandayan. V | AIADMK | 72,753 | 54.58 | Perumalsamy. K | INC | 50,156 | 37.63 | 22,597 | Karuthu Maiyanan. M | IND | 2,378 | 1.78 |
| 214 | Thoothukkudi | 73.73 | Chellapandian S.T | AIADMK | 89,010 | 56.78 | Geetha Jeevan P | DMK | 62,817 | 40.07 | 26,193 | Venkatesh, V. | JMK | 1,025 | 0.65 |
| 215 | Tiruchendur | 76.92 | Anitha R Radhakrishnan | DMK | 68,741 | 47.04 | Manoharan. Pr | AIADMK | 68,101 | 46.6 | 640 | Nattar. N | JMK | 3,240 | 2.22 |
| 216 | Srivaikuntam | 75.03 | Shunmuganathan.S.P | AIADMK | 69,708 | 52.86 | Sudalaiyandi.M.B | INC | 48,586 | 36.84 | 21,122 | Sudalaimani.S | JMK | 6,033 | 4.57 |
| 217 | Ottapidaram | 75.48 | Dr.K.Krishnasamy | PT | 71,330 | 56.41 | S.Raja | DMK | 46,204 | 36.54 | 25,126 | A.Muthupalavesam | BJP | 2,614 | 2.07 |
| 218 | Kovilpatti | 72.18 | Kadambur Raju C | AIADMK | 73,007 | 55.85 | Ramachandran G | PMK | 46,527 | 35.59 | 26,480 | Mariappan P | IND | 2,685 | 2.05 |
| 219 | Sankarankovil | 75.71 | Karuppasamy.C | AIADMK | 72,297 | 49.99 | Umamaheswari.M | DMK | 61,902 | 42.8 | 10,395 | Lakshmi Nathan.A | IND | 2,198 | 1.52 |
| 220 | Vasudevanallur | 76.49 | Dr.Duraiappa.S., M.B.B.S., | AIADMK | 80,633 | 56.77 | Ganesan.S | INC | 52,543 | 37 | 28,090 | Rajkumar.N | BJP | 2,340 | 1.65 |
| 221 | Kadayanallur | 75.42 | Chendur Pandian .P | AIADMK | 80,794 | 49.83 | Peter Alphonse .S | INC | 64,708 | 39.91 | 16,086 | Mohamed Mubarak .S. | SDPI | 6,649 | 4.1 |
| 222 | Tenkasi | 78.91 | Sarath Kumar.R | AIADMK | 92,253 | 54.3 | Karuppasami Pandian.Y | DMK | 69,286 | 40.78 | 22,967 | Anburaj.S.V | BJP | 2,698 | 1.59 |
| 223 | Alangulam | 81.02 | P. G. Rajendran | AIADMK | 78,098 | 47.29 | Dr.Poongothai Aladi Aruna | DMK | 77,799 | 47.11 | 299 | S. Sudalaiyandi | BJP | 2,664 | 1.61 |
| 224 | Tirunelveli | 76.88 | Nainar Nagenthran | AIADMK | 86,220 | 54.81 | Lakshmanan.A.L.S | DMK | 47,729 | 30.34 | 38,491 | Velammal.G | JMK | 7,771 | 4.94 |
| 225 | Ambasamudram | 75.08 | E Subaya | AIADMK | 80,156 | 55.11 | R Avudaiappan | DMK | 55,547 | 38.19 | 24,609 | S Nambirajan | JMK | 2,971 | 2.04 |
| 226 | Palayamkottai | 68.62 | T.P.M.Mohideen Khan | DMK | 58,049 | 42.76 | V.Palani | CPI(M) | 57,444 | 42.31 | 605 | K.S.Sahul Hameed | IND | 7,032 | 5.18 |
| 227 | Nanguneri | 76.8 | A.Narayanan | AIADMK | 65,510 | 45.91 | H.Vasanthakumar | INC | 53,230 | 37.31 | 12,280 | T.Dhevanathan Yadav | JMK | 13,425 | 9.41 |
| 228 | Radhapuram | 71.09 | S.Michael Rayappan | DMDK | 67,072 | 48.36 | P.Veldurai, | INC | 45,597 | 32.88 | 21,475 | N.Nallakannu | JMK | 6,336 | 4.57 |
| 229 | Kanniyakumari | 75.77 | Patchaimal.K.T | AIADMK | 86,903 | 48.22 | Suresh Rajan.N | DMK | 69,099 | 38.34 | 17,804 | Gandhi.M.R | BJP | 20,094 | 11.15 |
| 230 | Nagercoil | 70.12 | Nanjil Murugesan.A | AIADMK | 58,819 | 40.01 | Mahesh.R | DMK | 52,092 | 35.43 | 6,727 | Radhakrishnan.Pon | BJP | 33,623 | 22.87 |
| 231 | Colachel | 64.29 | Prince.J.G | INC | 58,428 | 40.16 | Larence.P | AIADMK | 46,607 | 32.03 | 11,821 | Ramesh.P | BJP | 35,778 | 24.59 |
| 232 | Padmanabhapuram | 69.95 | Dr.Pushpa Leela Alban | DMK | 59,882 | 41.48 | S.Austin | DMDK | 40,561 | 28.1 | 19,321 | G.Sujith Kumar | BJP | 34,491 | 23.89 |
| 233 | Vilavancode | 69.33 | Vijayadharani.S | INC | 62,898 | 43.69 | Leemarose.R | CPI(M) | 39,109 | 27.17 | 23,789 | Jayaseelan.R | BJP | 37,763 | 26.23 |
| 234 | Killiyoor | 63.91 | John Jacob.S | INC | 56,932 | 41.69 | Chandra Kumar.T | BJP | 32,446 | 23.76 | 24,486 | George.R | AIADMK | 29,920 | 21.91 |

- P. Vetrivel resigned on 17 May 2015.
