= T. R. Masilamani =

Member of the Legislative Assembly, Tamil Nadu Legislative Assembly
- In office 1989–1991
- Preceded by: G. Ananthakrishna
- Succeeded by: D. Sudarsanam
- Constituency: Poonamallee

Personal details
- Born: 27 September 1934 Thirumazhisai
- Party: DMK
- Profession: Farmer

T. R. Masilamani is an Indian politician and a former member of the Tamil Nadu Legislative Assembly hailing from Thirumazhisai in Thiruvallur district. Having completed his high school education, Masilamani joined the DMK party. He was elected to the Tamil Nadu Legislative Assembly from the Poonamallee constituency in the 1989 state assembly election, serving as a Member of the Legislative Assembly.

== Electoral Performance ==
=== 1989 ===
1989 Tamil Nadu Legislative Assembly election : Poonamallee
Party	Candidate	Votes	%	±%
DMK	T. R. Masilamani	58,640	48.11%	▲6.93
INC	G. Anantha Krishna	29,345	24.07%	▼31.90
Independent	M. Moorthy	13,429	11.02%	New
Independent	R. Goverdhanan	8,932	7.33%	New
AIADMK	Era. Kulasekaran	6,657	5.46%	New
Independent	R. Murugesan	1,678	1.38%	New
Independent	S. Muruganandam	813	0.67%	New
Independent	Somusa	790	0.65%	New
Margin of victory		29,295	24.03%	▲9.24
Turnout		123,888	67.27%	▲0.30
Total valid votes		121,900		
Registered electors		184,163		▲21.35
DMK gain from INC		Swing	▼7.86	
