= D. Rajarathinam =

Indian politician

Member of the Tamil Nadu Legislative Assembly
- In office 1967 - 1972; 1971 - 1976
- Constituency: Sriperumbudur
- In office 1977 - 1982; 1980 - 1985
- Constituency: Poonamallee

Personal details
- Party: Dravida Munnetra Kazhagam

D. Rajarathinam was an Indian politician and former Member of the Legislative Assembly of Tamil Nadu. He was elected to the Tamil Nadu Legislative Assembly from Sriperumbudur Constituency as a Dravida Munnetra Kazhagam candidate in 1967 and 1971 elections. He was elected from Poonamallee Constituency as a Dravida Munnetra Kazhagam candidate in 1977 and 1980 elections.

== Electoral performance ==
1991 Tamil Nadu Legislative Assembly election: Poonamallee
| Party | Candidate | Votes | % | ±% |
|---|---|---|---|---|
| INC | D. Sudarsanam | 68,392 | 55.50% | +31.43 |
| DMK | D. Rajarathinam | 44,240 | 35.90% | −12.2 |
| PMK | R. K. Kothandan | 7,544 | 6.12% | New |
| BJP | V. Sampath | 1,866 | 1.51% | New |
| Margin of victory | | 24,152 | 19.60% | −4.43% |
| Turnout | | 123,225 | 59.46% | −7.81% |
| Registered electors | | 212,565 | | |
| INC gain from DMK | | Swing | 7.40% | |

1984 Tamil Nadu Legislative Assembly election: Poonamallee
| Party | Candidate | Votes | % | ±% |
|---|---|---|---|---|
| INC | G. Anantha Krishna | 55,129 | 55.97% | New |
| DMK | D. Rajarathinam | 40,562 | 41.18% | −7.65 |
| Independent | S. Subramani | 1,150 | 1.17% | New |
| Independent | M. Dilli | 589 | 0.60% | New |
| Independent | A. Samuel Patrick | 502 | 0.51% | New |
| Margin of victory | | 14,567 | 14.79% | 0.55% |
| Turnout | | 98,506 | 66.97% | 10.24% |
| Registered electors | | 151,761 | | |
| INC gain from DMK | | Swing | 7.14% | |

1980 Tamil Nadu Legislative Assembly election: Poonamallee
| Party | Candidate | Votes | % | ±% |
|---|---|---|---|---|
| DMK | D. Rajarathinam | 38,018 | 48.83% | +12.34 |
| GKC | Sambandan | 26,930 | 34.59% | New |
| Independent | Poovai P. Chinnasamy | 8,547 | 10.98% | New |
| Independent | M. Moorthy | 2,246 | 2.88% | New |
| BJP | G. Thiruven Gadam | 1,605 | 2.06% | New |
| Independent | T. Lakshmipathy Naidu | 514 | 0.66% | New |
| Margin of victory | | 11,088 | 14.24% | 7.52% |
| Turnout | | 77,860 | 56.73% | 4.97% |
| Registered electors | | 139,060 | | |
| DMK hold | | Swing | 12.34% | |

1977 Tamil Nadu Legislative Assembly election: Poonamallee
| Party | Candidate | Votes | % | ±% |
|---|---|---|---|---|
| DMK | D. Rajarathinam | 26,552 | 36.49% | New |
| AIADMK | Era Kulasekaran | 21,659 | 29.76% | New |
| JP | J. Madan Raj | 16,660 | 22.89% | New |
| INC | A. Palapandvan | 7,357 | 10.11% | New |
| Margin of victory | | 4,893 | 6.72% | |
| Turnout | | 72,774 | 51.76% | |
| Registered electors | | 143,250 | | |
| DMK win (new seat) | | | | |

1971 Tamil Nadu Legislative Assembly election: Sriperumbudur
| Party | Candidate | Votes | % | ±% |
|---|---|---|---|---|
| DMK | D. Rajarathinam | 46,617 | 59.15% | +5.01 |
| INC | Manali Ramakrishna Mudaliar | 32,201 | 40.85% | −1.68 |
| Margin of victory | | 14,416 | 18.29% | 6.69% |
| Turnout | | 78,818 | 72.42% | −9.94% |
| Registered electors | | 1,11,779 | | |
| DMK hold | | Swing | 5.01% | |

1967 Madras Legislative Assembly election: Sriperumbudur
| Party | Candidate | Votes | % | ±% |
|---|---|---|---|---|
| DMK | D. Rajarathinam | 41,655 | 54.13% | +6.31 |
| INC | M. Bhaktavatsalam | 32,729 | 42.53% | −7.1 |
| Independent | Guindirathinam | 1,640 | 2.13% | New |
| Independent | Subramanian | 558 | 0.73% | New |
| Margin of victory | | 8,926 | 11.60% | 9.78% |
| Turnout | | 76,949 | 82.37% | 7.06% |
| Registered electors | | 96,287 | | |
| DMK gain from INC | | Swing | 4.50% | |
