= Varadhan =

Varadhan is a surname. Notable people with the surname include:

- Polur Varadhan (1952–2011), Indian politician
- S. R. Srinivasa Varadhan (born 1940), Indian American mathematician
  - Varadhan's lemma
