= Polur Varadhan =

Indian politician

Member of the Tamil Nadu Legislative Assembly
- In office 2001–2011
- Preceded by: K. V. Nannan
- Succeeded by: T. Sureshkumar
- Constituency: Chengam
- In office 1991–1996
- Preceded by: E. Kothandam
- Succeeded by: E. Kothandam
- Constituency: Sriperumbudur

Personal details
- Born: 25 February 1952 Keezhkarikkathur, Tiruvannamalai district, Tamilnadu
- Died: January 27, 2011 (aged 58) Chennai, Tamilnadu
- Party: Indian National Congress
- Spouse: Prema
- Children: Rajiv
- Occupation: politician

Polur M. Varadhan (25 February 1952 – 27 January 2011) was an Indian politician and Member of the Legislative Assembly of Tamil Nadu. He was elected to the Tamil Nadu legislative assembly from Chengam constituency as an Indian National Congress candidate in 2001, and 2006 elections and from Sriperumbudur constituency in 1991 election.

== Personal life ==
Varadhan was born in Keezhkarikkathur village in Polur Taluk in Tiruvannamalai district in Tamil Nadu on 25 February 1952. He died in Chennai on 27 January 2011 due to an unreported liver illness. He is survived by his wife Prema and a son named Rajiv.

== Electoral performance ==
Election	Constituency	Political party	Result	Vote %	Opposition			Ref
Election	Constituency	Political party	Result	Vote %	Candidate	Political party	Vote %	Ref
1989	Egmore	INC	Lost	22.34%	Parithi Ilamvazhuthi	DMK	49.80%	
1991	Sriperumbudur	INC	Won	60.95%	E. Kothandam	DMK	29.89%	
2001	Chengam	INC	Won	48.43%	R. Shamala	Makkal Tamil Desam	37.45%	
2006	Chengam	INC	Won	42.75%	P. Sakthivel	VCK	34.58%	
