= Prakasam R. =

Indian politician (born 1982)

Member of the Tamil Nadu Legislative Assembly
- Incumbent
- Assumed office 2026
- Constituency: Poonamallee
- Majority: 72,740

Personal details
- Born: 1982 (age 43–44) India
- Occupation: Politician

Raja Prakasam (born 1982) is an Indian politician from Tamil Nadu. He is a member of the Tamil Nadu Legislative Assembly from Poonamallee Assembly constituency which is reserved for Scheduled Caste community in Thiruvallur district representing Tamilaga Vettri Kazhagam.

== Early life ==
Prakasam is from Poonamallee, Tamil Nadu. He is the son of Raja. He studied at Government Higher School, Manavalanagar, Thiruvallur and passed the SSLC (Class 10) examinations in March 1998.

== Career ==
Prakasam became an MLA for the first time winning the 2026 Tamil Nadu Legislative Assembly election from Poonamallee Assembly constituency representing Tamilaga Vettri Kazhagam. He polled 1,61,309 votes and defeated his nearest rival, A. Krishnaswamy of the Dravida Munnetra Kazhagam, by a margin of 72,740 votes.
