= K. Armstrong =

Indian lawyer and politician

State President of Bahujan Samaj Party, Tamil Nadu
- In office 4 July 2010 – 5 July 2024
- President: Mayawati
- Preceded by: K. Selvaperunthagai
- Succeeded by: P. Anandan
- In office 24 September 2007 – 11 November 2008
- President: Mayawati
- Succeeded by: K. Selvaperunthagai

Personal details
- Born: 31 January 1972 Chennai, Tamil Nadu, India
- Died: July 5, 2024 (aged 52)
- Cause of death: Assassination
- Party: Bahujan Samaj Party
- Other political affiliations: Puratchi Bharatam Katchi; Independent
- Spouse: Porkodi Armstrong (m. 2016)
- Children: 1
- Occupation: politician, lawyer, activist

K. Armstrong (31 January 1972 – 5 July 2024) was an Indian lawyer and politician from the state of Tamil Nadu. He was the state president of Tamil Nadu unit of the Bahujan Samaj Party. An Ambedkarite Buddhist, Armstrong was known as a prominent Dalit social and political activist in the state.

He was assassinated outside his residence on 5 July 2024. His murder led to protests and public demonstrations in parts of Tamil Nadu, with Dalit organisations and political leaders demanding justice and highlighting violence against Dalits.

== Early and Personal life ==
Armstrong was born and brought up in Chennai’s Perambur to M. Krishnan and Lily. His father was a supporter of Periyar and Dravida Kazhagam. After studying law from Sri Venkateswara University, Tirupati, he began practising in the Chennai courts. Armstrong enrolled with the Bar Council of Tamil Nadu in 2009, a year after his childhood friend Porkodi had registered. On 6 March 2016, he married Porkodi (born 8 August 1974) in a ceremony attended by 50 Buddhist monks from various South Asian countries; on the same occasion, he embraced Buddhism. On 14 March 2023, the couple had a daughter named Savitribai, after seven years of marriage.

== Political career ==
In 2000, he joined active politics with the Puratchi Bharatham Katchi under the leadership of Poovai Murthy. In 2006, he contested as an independent candidate and was elected from a ward in North Chennai as a councillor in the Chennai Municipal Corporation elections. Subsequently he joined the BSP on 24 September 2007 and was made the state unit president.

In 2011, he contested unsuccessfully against then deputy chief minister M.K Stalin in the assembly elections from Kolathur. He was the state president of Bahujan Samaj Party for 17 years from 2007 till his death.

== Assassination ==
On 5 July 2024, Armstrong was attacked and killed by a group of six people near his home, which was under construction. He is survived by his wife and daughter.

=== Investigation ===
From July to October 2024, the Tamil Nadu Police arrested 26 individuals in connection with the case, including two functionaries each from the AIADMK and the BJP. In September 2024, the Madras High Court ordered the transfer of the investigation to the CBI. In November 2025, the Supreme Court of India stayed the transfer of the probe to the CBI.

== Reaction ==
His murder led to protests and public demonstrations in parts of Tamil Nadu, with Dalit organisations and political leaders demanding justice and highlighting violence against Dalits. Among the prominent figures demanding justice included his friend and film director Pa. Ranjith.

== Election contested ==
2011 Tamil Nadu Legislative Assembly election: Kolathur
Party	Candidate	Votes	%	±%
DMK	M. K. Stalin	68,677	48.35	
AIADMK	Saidai Duraisamy	65,943	46.43	
BSP	K. Armstrong	4,004	2.82	
Margin of victory		2,734	1.92	
Turnout		1,41,989	68.28	
Registered electors		2,07,990		
DMK win (new seat)				
