= T. Sureshkumar =

Indian politician

Member of the Tamil Nadu Legislative Assembly
- In office 2011–2016
- Preceded by: Polur Varadhan
- Succeeded by: M. P. Giri
- Constituency: Chengam

Personal details
- Party: Desiya Murpokku Dravida Kazhagam

T. Sureshkumar is an Indian politician and incumbent Member of the Tamil Nadu Legislative Assembly from the Chengam constituency. He represents the Desiya Murpokku Dravidar Kazhagam party.

== Electoral performance ==
Election	Constituency	Political party	Result	Vote %	Opposition			Ref
Election	Constituency	Political party	Result	Vote %	Candidate	Political party	Vote %	Ref
2011	Chengam	DMDK	Won	46.95%	K. Selvaperunthagai	INC	40.50%	
