= K. Selvaperunthagai =

Indian politician

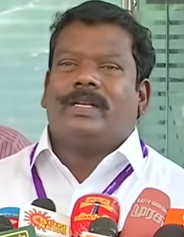

President of the Tamil Nadu Congress Committee
- In office 18 February 2024 – 27 June 2026
- National President: Mallikarjun Kharge
- Preceded by: K. S. Alagiri
- Succeeded by: Manickam Tagore

Leader of Congress Legislative Party, Tamil Nadu Assembly
- In office May 2021 – February 2024
- Preceded by: K.R.Ramasamy
- Succeeded by: S. Rajeshkumar

State Chairman, SC Department, Tamil Nadu Congress Committee
- In office 2012–2022

Chair Person, Public Accounts Committee, Tamil Nadu Legislative Assembly
- In office 25 June 2021 – 4 May 2026
- Preceded by: M.K.Stalin

Member, Tamil Nadu Legislative Assembly (MLA)
- In office 2 May 2021 – 6 May 2026
- Preceded by: K. Palani
- Succeeded by: Thennarasu. K.
- Constituency: Sriperumbudur
- In office 11 May 2006 – 13 May 2011
- Preceded by: C. V. Ganesan
- Succeeded by: Assembly delimited as Tittakudi
- Constituency: Mangalore

Member, SC/ST Welfare Committee, Government of Tamil Nadu
- Incumbent
- Assumed office 24 July 2021

State President of BSP, Tamil Nadu
- In office 11 November 2008 – 4 July 2010
- Preceded by: K. Armstrong
- Succeeded by: K. Armstrong

Personal details
- Born: 14 April 1964 (age 62) Manimangalam, Madras State, India
- Party: Indian National Congress(Since 2010)
- Spouse: Umayal Selvaperunthagai
- Education: BL (Sri Venkateswara University); MA (Madras University)
- Occupation: Politician, advocate

Kuppusamy Selvaperunthagai is an Indian politician representing the party Indian National Congress. He was the president of Tamil Nadu Congress party from 2024 to 2026. He served as the State Chairman of the Tamil Nadu Congress Committee's section of SC Department. He is an Ex MLA from Sriperumbudur Constituency.

== Early life ==
K.Selvaperunthagai was born on 14 April 1964 at Manimangalam Village, Sriperumbudur, Tamil Nadu. His parents were Kuppusamy and Rasammal.

He did his Bachelor of Law at Sri Venkateswara University, Tirupati and MA at Madras University.

== Political career ==
He started his political career at Puratchi Bharatham Katchi. He later joined Puthiya Tamilagam Party and got expelled in January 2001. He was elected to the Tamil Nadu Legislative Assembly from Mangalore constituency in the 2006 Tamil Nadu Assembly elections as a member of the party Viduthalai Chiruthaigal Katchi, After that, due to a disagreement with Thirumavalavan, he left the VCK and joined Bahujan Samaj Party on 11 November 2008 and later switched to Congress on 1 August 2010.

== Member of Legislative Assembly ==
He was Member of Legislative Assembly (MLA) to the 2021 Tamil Nadu Assembly elections from Sriperumbudur Assembly constituency on behalf of the Indian National Congress and has been elected as the Leader of the Legislative Assembly of the Congress Party. On 25 June 2021, he was unanimously nominated as Chairperson of the Public Accounts Committee of Tamil Nadu Legislative Assembly. On 24 July 2021, he was appointed a member of All party SC/ST Welfare Committee, Government of Tamil Nadu by Chief Minister Thiru. M.K.Stalin.

Committee assignments of 16th Tamil Nadu Assembly

- Chairperson (2021–23) Public Accounts Committee

== Electoral performances ==
Year	Election	Party	Constituency Name	Result	Votes gained	Vote share%
2006	Tamil Nadu Assembly Election	Viduthalai Chiruthaigal Katchi	Mangalore	Won	62,217	43.7%
2011	Tamil Nadu Assembly Election	Indian National Congress	Chengam	Lost	72,225	40.50%
2016	Tamil Nadu Assembly Election	Indian National Congress	Sriperumbudur	Lost	90,285	38.23%
2021	Tamil Nadu Assembly Election	Indian National Congress	Sriperumbudur	Won	1,15,353	43.65%
2026	Tamil Nadu Assembly Election	Indian National Congress	Sriperumbudur	Lost	93,365	28.20%

2026 Tamil Nadu Legislative Assembly election: Sriperumbudur
Party	Candidate	Votes	%	±%
TVK	Thennarasu. K	147,611	44.58	New
INC	K. Selvaperunthagai	93,365	28.20	▼15.45
AIADMK	K. Palani	73,182	22.10	▼17.43
NTK	M. Sindhu Ezhilarasan	13,150	3.97	▼4.37
NOTA	NOTA	1,161	0.35	▼0.46
CPI(ML)L	M. Tamilarasan	511	0.15	New
All India Puratchi Thalaivar Makkal Munnetra Kazhagam	D. Purushothaman	489	0.15	New
Anaithinthiya Anna Dravida Makkal Seyal Katchi	A. Guruanandhan	479	0.14	New
TVK	A. Gnanasekaran	271	0.08	New
Independent	P. Vedhagiri	258	0.08	New
Independent	G. Rajathi	211	0.06	New
Independent	J. Nithya	176	0.05	New
Independent	Elangovan Sivakumar	112	0.03	New
Independent	E. Murugan	112	0.03	New
Margin of victory		54,246	16.38	▲12.26
Turnout		3,31,088	86.72	▲12.32
Registered electors		3,81,807		▲26,609
TVK gain from INC		Swing	▲44.58	

2021 Tamil Nadu Legislative Assembly election: Sriperumbudur
Party	Candidate	Votes	%	±%
INC	K. Selvaperunthagai	115,353	43.65%	+5.42
AIADMK	Palani	1,04,474	39.53%	−3.24
NTK	Pushparaj	22,034	8.34%	+6.88
MNM	Thanigaivel	8,870	3.36%	New
Independent	Vairamuthu	6,340	2.40%	New
AMMK	Perumal	3,144	1.19%	New
NOTA	NOTA	2,139	0.81%	−0.44
Margin of victory		10,879	4.12%	−0.42%
Turnout		2,64,262	74.40%	−2.70%
Rejected ballots		31	0.01%	
Registered electors		3,55,198		
INC gain from AIADMK		Swing	0.88%	

2016 Tamil Nadu Legislative Assembly election: Sriperumbudur
Party	Candidate	Votes	%	±%
AIADMK	K. Palani	101,001	42.77%	−16.3
INC	K. Selvaperunthagai	90,285	38.23%	+2.93
PMK	C. Muthuraman	18,185	7.70%	New
VCK	M. Veerakumar	13,679	5.79%	New
BJP	M. Manoharan	3,939	1.67%	+0.47
NTK	B. Sivaranjini	3,441	1.46%	New
NOTA	NOTA	2,956	1.25%	New
Margin of victory		10,716	4.54%	−19.22%
Turnout		2,36,142	77.10%	−4.76%
Registered electors		3,06,296		
AIADMK hold		Swing	-16.30%	

2011 Tamil Nadu Legislative Assembly election : Chengam
Party	Candidate	Votes	%	±%
DMDK	T. Sureshkumar	83,722	46.95%	▲34.29
INC	K. Selvaperunthagai	72,225	40.50%	▼2.25
Independent	R. Sureshkumar	8,543	4.79%	
BJP	A. Jayaraman	4,465	2.50%	▼0.71
Independent	R. Kumar	2,511	1.41%	
IJK	M. Mani	1,670	0.94%	New
BSP	A. V. Subramanian	1,636	0.92%	▼1.19
Independent	K. Sankar	1,364	0.76%	
Independent	T. Suresh	1,347	0.76%	
Margin of victory		11,497	6.45%	▼1.72
Turnout		178,371	84.27%	▲13.00
Total valid votes		178,325		
Rejected ballots		46	0.03%	▲0.03
Registered electors		211,656		▲20.84
DMDK gain from INC		Swing	▲4.20	

2006 Tamil Nadu Legislative Assembly election: Mangalore
Party	Candidate	Votes	%	±%
VCK	K. Selvam	62,217	43.71%	
DMK	C. V. Ganesan	55,303	38.85%	−9.02%
DMDK	D. Mahadevan	15,992	11.23%	
Independent	K. Thiruvalluvan	2,462	1.73%	
BJP	R. Narentheran	2,173	1.53%	
Independent	T. Elavarasan	1,585	1.11%	
Margin of victory		6,914	4.86%	3.48%
Turnout		142,349	73.42%	4.15%
Registered electors		193,879		
VCK gain from DMK		Swing	-4.16%	
