= D. Yasodha =

Indian politician (1944–2020)

Member of the Tamil Nadu Legislative Assembly
- In office 2001–2011
- Constituency: Sriperumbudur
- In office 1980–1989
- Constituency: Sriperumbudur

Personal details
- Born: March 27, 1944 Chennai, Egmore, Tamil Nadu
- Died: 27 December 2020 (aged 76) Chennai, Tamil Nadu, India
- Party: INC
- Children: 2 (adopted)
- As of 27 December, 2020

D. Yasodha (27 March 1944 – 27 December 2020) was an Indian politician and four times Member of Legislative assembly. She was elected to Tamil Nadu legislative assembly from Sriperumbudur constituency 1980, 1984, 2001 and 2006 elections as an Indian National Congress candidate.

Yasodha died on 27 December 2020, in Chennai due to illness.

== Electoral performance ==
2006 Tamil Nadu Legislative Assembly election: Sriperumbudur
Party	Candidate	Votes	%	±%
INC	D. Yasodha	70,066	43.78%	−6.15
VCK	K. Balakrishnan	52,272	32.66%	New
DMDK	C. Palani	30,096	18.81%	New
BJP	G. Sivakumar	2,866	1.79%	New
Independent	R. Ranganathan	1,803	1.13%	New
Independent	A. Anbazagan	1,350	0.84%	New
Independent	M. Kadirvelu	911	0.57%	New
Margin of victory		17,794	11.12%	−1.03%
Turnout		1,60,042	67.04%	3.58%
Registered electors		2,38,710		
INC hold		Swing	-6.15%	

2001 Tamil Nadu Legislative Assembly election: Sriperumbudur
Party	Candidate	Votes	%	±%
INC	D. Yasodha	70,663	49.93%	+21.11
DMK	Raghavan M	53,470	37.78%	−20.93
Puratchi Bharatham	M. Moorthy	9,322	6.59%	New
MDMK	Sampath V	4,864	3.44%	−1.3
Independent	N. Nithi Alias Karunanithi	1,834	1.30%	New
SPSP	Selvam N	1,362	0.96%	New
Margin of victory		17,193	12.15%	−17.74%
Turnout		1,41,515	63.47%	−4.12%
Registered electors		2,22,968		
INC gain from DMK		Swing	-8.78%	

1991 Tamil Nadu Legislative Assembly election: Egmore
Party	Candidate	Votes	%	±%
DMK	Parithi Ilamvazhuthi	23,139	50.47	+0.67
INC	D. Yasodha	21,936	47.84	+25.5
Independent	Sivakumar	276	0.60	New
Margin of victory		1,203	2.62	−24.83
Turnout		45,849	35.95	−31.35
Registered electors		1,28,272		
DMK hold		Swing	0.67	

1989 Tamil Nadu Legislative Assembly election : Ponneri
Party	Candidate	Votes	%	±%
DMK	K. Sundaram	51,928	44.53%	▲4.57
AIADMK	K. Tamizharasan	44,321	38.01%	New
INC	D. Yasodha	14,410	12.36%	New
AIADMK	K. P. K. Sekar Alias K. P. Kulasekaran	5,280	4.53%	New
Margin of victory		7,607	6.52%	▼12.57
Turnout		118,907	71.28%	▼5.13
Total valid votes		116,616		
Registered electors		166,812		▲16.57
DMK gain from AIADMK		Swing	▼14.52	

1984 Tamil Nadu Legislative Assembly election: Sriperumbudur
Party	Candidate	Votes	%	±%
INC	D. Yasodha	46,421	53.94%	+0.97
DMK	K. M. Panchatcharam	34,601	40.21%	New
Independent	T. S. Lakshmanan	3,403	3.95%	New
Independent	T. C. Gopal	595	0.69%	New
Independent	K. Sambandan	471	0.55%	New
Margin of victory		11,820	13.73%	5.19%
Turnout		86,059	75.06%	13.90%
Registered electors		1,20,459		
INC hold		Swing	0.97%	

1980 Tamil Nadu Legislative Assembly election: Sriperumbudur
Party	Candidate	Votes	%	±%
INC	D. Yasodha	37,370	52.97%	+40.08
AIADMK	S. Jaganathan	31,341	44.42%	+1.43
JP	T. Ayyavoo	1,842	2.61%	New
Margin of victory		6,029	8.55%	−3.50%
Turnout		70,553	61.16%	−2.45%
Registered electors		1,16,937		
INC gain from AIADMK		Swing	9.97%	
