= T. Swamikannu =

Indian politician

T. Swamikannu was an Indian politician and former Member of the Legislative Assembly of Tamil Nadu. He was elected to the Tamil Nadu legislative assembly from Chengam constituency as an Anna Dravida Munnetra Kazhagam candidate in 1977, 1980, and 1984 elections.

== Electoral performance ==
Election	Constituency	Political party	Result	Vote %	Opposition			Ref
Election	Constituency	Political party	Result	Vote %	Candidate	Political party	Vote %	Ref
1977	Chengam	AIADMK	Won	46.36%	N. Poosanar	DMK	24.16%	
1980	Chengam	AIADMK	Won	48.06%	A. Arumugam	INC	46.56%	
1984	Chengam	AIADMK	Won	61.42%	P. Anbalagan	JP	28.23%	
1989	Chengam	AIADMK	Lost	15.03%	M. Settu	JP	34.74%	
1991	Chengam	Independent	Lost	7.66%	P. Veera Pandiyan	AIADMK	59.31%	
