= M. P. Giri =

Indian politician

Member of the Tamil Nadu Legislative Assembly
- In office 16 May 2016 – 4 May 2026
- Preceded by: T. Sureshkumar
- Succeeded by: S. Velu
- Constituency: Chengam

Personal details
- Party: Dravida Munnetra Kazhagam

M. P. Giri is an Indian politician who is a Member of Legislative Assembly of Tamil Nadu. He was elected from Chengam as a Dravida Munnetra Kazhagam candidate in 2016 and 2021.

== Electoral performance ==
Election	Constituency	Political party	Result	Vote %	Opposition			Ref
Election	Constituency	Political party	Result	Vote %	Candidate	Political party	Vote %	Ref
2016	Chengam	DMK	Won	45.60%	M. Dinagaran	AIADMK	39.57%	
2021	Chengam	DMK	Won	48.50%	M. S. Nainakannu	AIADMK	43.30%	-
2026	Chengam	DMK	Lost	28.96%	S. Velu	AIADMK	36.15%	-
