= S. Velu =

Indian politician (born 1973)

Member of the Tamil Nadu Legislative Assembly
- Incumbent
- Assumed office 11 May 2026
- Preceded by: M. P. Giri
- Constituency: Chengam

Personal details
- Born: 1973 (age 52–53) Chengam, Tamil Nadu, India
- Party: All India Anna Dravida Munnetra Kazhagam
- Parent: T. Samikannu (father)
- Education: Annamalai University (B.Sc.)
- Occupation: Agriculturalist, Politician

T. Samikannu Velu (born 1973) is an Indian politician from Tamil Nadu. He is a member of the Tamil Nadu Legislative Assembly from Chengam Assembly constituency which is reserved for Scheduled Caste community in Tiruvannamalai district representing the All India Anna Dravida Munnetra Kazhagam.

Velu is from Chengam, Tiruvannamalai district, Tamil Nadu. He is the son of Tha. Samikannu. He completed his B.Sc. in agriculture in 1999 at Annamalai University and is into farming. He declared assets worth Rs.9 crore in his affidavit to the Election Commission of India.

He became an MLA winning the 2026 Tamil Nadu Legislative Assembly election from Chengam Assembly constituency representing the All India Anna Dravida Munnetra Kazhagam. He polled 87,802 votes and defeated his nearest rival K. Bharatidhasan, of the Tamilaga Vettri Kazhagam, by a margin of 13,278 votes.

== Electoral performance ==
Election	Constituency	Political party	Result	Vote %	Opposition			Ref
Election	Constituency	Political party	Result	Vote %	Candidate	Political party	Vote %	Ref
2026	Chengam	AIADMK	Won	36.15%	K. Bharathidhasan	TVK	30.68%	-
