= R. Manimaran (Poonamallee MLA) =

Indian politician

R. Manimaran is an Indian politician and former Member of the Legislative Assembly of Tamil Nadu. In the 2011 elections, he won a seat in the 14th Tamil Nadu Legislative Assembly from the Poonamallee constituency, which is reserved for Scheduled Castes, as a candidate of the All India Anna Dravida Munnetra Kazhagam party.

The elections of 2016 resulted in his constituency being won by T. A. Elumalai.
