= Sriperumbudur Assembly constituency =

State Legislative Assembly Constituency in Tamil Nadu

Coordinates: 12.93°N 79.91°E

Sriperumbudur
- Constituency No. 29 for the Tamil Nadu Legislative Assembly

Constituency details
- Country: India
- Region: South India
- State: Tamil Nadu
- District: Kanchipuram
- Lok Sabha constituency: Sriperumbudur
- Established: 1951
- Total electors: 3,81,807
- Reservation: SC

Member of Legislative Assembly
- 17th Tamil Nadu Legislative Assembly
- Incumbent Thennarasu. K.
- Party: TVK
- Alliance: TVK+
- Elected year: 2026

Sriperumbudur is a state assembly constituency in Kancheepuram district of Tamil Nadu, India. Its State Assembly Constituency number is 29. It is reserved for candidates from the Scheduled Castes and comprises a portion of Sriperumbudur taluk. It falls under Sriperumbudur Lok Sabha constituency for elections to the Parliament of India. It is one of the 234 State Legislative Assembly Constituencies in Tamil Nadu, in India.

== Members of Legislative Assembly ==
=== Madras State ===
Year	Winner	Party
1952	T. Shanmugam	Independent
1957	M. Bhaktavatsalam	Indian National Congress
1962	M. Bhaktavatsalam (Chief Minister)	Indian National Congress
1967	D. Rajarathinam	Dravida Munnetra Kazhagam

=== Tamil Nadu ===
Year	Winner	Party
1971	D. Rajarathinam	Dravida Munnetra Kazhagam
1977	N. Krishnan	All India Anna Dravida Munnetra Kazhagam
1980	D. Yasodha	Indian National Congress (I)
1984	D. Yasodha	Indian National Congress
1989	E. Kothandam	Dravida Munnetra Kazhagam
1991	Polur Varadhan	Indian National Congress
1996	E. Kothandam	Dravida Munnetra Kazhagam
2001	D. Yasodha	Indian National Congress
2006	D. Yasodha	Indian National Congress
2011	R. Perumal	All India Anna Dravida Munnetra Kazhagam
2016	K. Palani	All India Anna Dravida Munnetra Kazhagam
2021	K. Selvaperunthagai	Indian National Congress
2026	Thennarasu. S. P. K	Tamilaga Vettri Kazhagam

== Election results ==
Vote share of winning candidates
2026	44.58%
2021	43.65%
2016	42.77%
2011	59.07%
2006	43.78%
2001	49.93%
1996	58.72%
1991	60.95%
1989	42.21%
1984	53.94%
1980	52.97%
1977	43.00%
1971	59.15%
1967	54.13%
1962	49.64%
1957	53.05%
1952	41.67%

=== 2026 ===
2026 Tamil Nadu Legislative Assembly election: Sriperumbudur
Party	Candidate	Votes	%	±%
TVK	Thennarasu. K	147,611	44.58	New
INC	K. Selvaperunthagai	93,365	28.20	▼15.45
AIADMK	K. Palani	73,182	22.10	▼17.43
NTK	M. Sindhu Ezhilarasan	13,150	3.97	▼4.37
NOTA	NOTA	1,161	0.35	▼0.46
Margin of victory		54,246	16.38	▲12.26
Turnout		3,31,088	86.72	▲12.32
Registered electors		3,81,807		▲26,609
TVK gain from INC		Swing	▲44.58	

=== 2021 ===
2021 Tamil Nadu Legislative Assembly election: Sriperumbudur
Party	Candidate	Votes	%	±%
INC	K. Selvaperunthagai	115,353	43.65%	+5.42
AIADMK	Palani	1,04,474	39.53%	−3.24
NTK	Pushparaj	22,034	8.34%	+6.88
MNM	Thanigaivel	8,870	3.36%	New
Independent	Vairamuthu	6,340	2.40%	New
AMMK	Perumal	3,144	1.19%	New
NOTA	NOTA	2,139	0.81%	−0.44
Margin of victory		10,879	4.12%	−0.42%
Turnout		2,64,262	74.40%	−2.70%
Rejected ballots		31	0.01%	
Registered electors		3,55,198		
INC gain from AIADMK		Swing	0.88%	

=== 2016 ===
2016 Tamil Nadu Legislative Assembly election: Sriperumbudur
Party	Candidate	Votes	%	±%
AIADMK	K. Palani	101,001	42.77%	−16.3
INC	K. Selvaperunthagai	90,285	38.23%	+2.93
PMK	C. Muthuraman	18,185	7.70%	New
VCK	M. Veerakumar	13,679	5.79%	New
BJP	M. Manoharan	3,939	1.67%	+0.47
NTK	B. Sivaranjini	3,441	1.46%	New
NOTA	NOTA	2,956	1.25%	New
Margin of victory		10,716	4.54%	−19.22%
Turnout		2,36,142	77.10%	−4.76%
Registered electors		3,06,296		
AIADMK hold		Swing	-16.30%	

=== 2011 ===
2011 Tamil Nadu Legislative Assembly election: Sriperumbudur
Party	Candidate	Votes	%	±%
AIADMK	R. Perumal	101,751	59.07%	New
INC	D. Yasodha	60,819	35.31%	−8.47
Puratchi Bharatham	C. Dhanasekaran	2,968	1.72%	New
BJP	A. Harikrishnan	2,072	1.20%	−0.59
Independent	V. Ramesh	960	0.56%	New
PPIS (Tamil Nadu)	D. Kumaresan	950	0.55%	New
Margin of victory		40,932	23.76%	12.64%
Turnout		1,72,263	81.85%	14.81%
Registered electors		2,10,457		
AIADMK gain from INC		Swing	15.29%	

=== 2006 ===
2006 Tamil Nadu Legislative Assembly election: Sriperumbudur
Party	Candidate	Votes	%	±%
INC	D. Yasodha	70,066	43.78%	−6.15
VCK	K. Balakrishnan	52,272	32.66%	New
DMDK	C. Palani	30,096	18.81%	New
BJP	G. Sivakumar	2,866	1.79%	New
Independent	R. Ranganathan	1,803	1.13%	New
Independent	A. Anbazagan	1,350	0.84%	New
Independent	M. Kadirvelu	911	0.57%	New
Margin of victory		17,794	11.12%	−1.03%
Turnout		1,60,042	67.04%	3.58%
Registered electors		2,38,710		
INC hold		Swing	-6.15%	

=== 2001 ===
2001 Tamil Nadu Legislative Assembly election: Sriperumbudur
Party	Candidate	Votes	%	±%
INC	D. Yasodha	70,663	49.93%	+21.11
DMK	Raghavan M	53,470	37.78%	−20.93
Puratchi Bharatham	M. Moorthy	9,322	6.59%	New
MDMK	Sampath V	4,864	3.44%	−1.3
Independent	N. Nithi Alias Karunanithi	1,834	1.30%	New
SPSP	Selvam N	1,362	0.96%	New
Margin of victory		17,193	12.15%	−17.74%
Turnout		1,41,515	63.47%	−4.12%
Registered electors		2,22,968		
INC gain from DMK		Swing	-8.78%	

=== 1996 ===
1996 Tamil Nadu Legislative Assembly election: Sriperumbudur
Party	Candidate	Votes	%	±%
DMK	E. Kothandam	71,575	58.72%	+28.83
INC	K. N. Chinnandi	35,139	28.83%	−32.12
Independent	A. Seppan	7,447	6.11%	New
MDMK	V. Sampath	5,779	4.74%	New
BJP	C. Shanmugam	1,329	1.09%	New
Margin of victory		36,436	29.89%	−1.16%
Turnout		1,21,900	67.59%	0.22%
Registered electors		1,86,960		
DMK gain from INC		Swing	-2.23%	

=== 1991 ===
1991 Tamil Nadu Legislative Assembly election: Sriperumbudur
Party	Candidate	Votes	%	±%
INC	Polur Varadhan	63,656	60.95%	+44.16
DMK	E. Kothandam	31,220	29.89%	−12.32
PMK	S. Manogaran	8,752	8.38%	New
Margin of victory		32,436	31.05%	24.05%
Turnout		1,04,448	67.37%	2.54%
Registered electors		1,60,453		
INC gain from DMK		Swing	18.74%	

=== 1989 ===
1989 Tamil Nadu Legislative Assembly election: Sriperumbudur
Party	Candidate	Votes	%	±%
DMK	E. Kothandam	38,496	42.21%	+2
AIADMK	Arulupugazhenthi	32,106	35.20%	New
INC	K. N. Chinnandi	15,312	16.79%	−37.15
Independent	C. Deenadayalan	4,064	4.46%	New
Independent	S. P. Chinnappa	682	0.75%	New
Margin of victory		6,390	7.01%	−6.73%
Turnout		91,210	64.84%	−10.22%
Registered electors		1,43,453		
DMK gain from INC		Swing	-11.74%	

=== 1984 ===
1984 Tamil Nadu Legislative Assembly election: Sriperumbudur
Party	Candidate	Votes	%	±%
INC	D. Yasodha	46,421	53.94%	+0.97
DMK	K. M. Panchatcharam	34,601	40.21%	New
Independent	T. S. Lakshmanan	3,403	3.95%	New
Independent	T. C. Gopal	595	0.69%	New
Independent	K. Sambandan	471	0.55%	New
Margin of victory		11,820	13.73%	5.19%
Turnout		86,059	75.06%	13.90%
Registered electors		1,20,459		
INC hold		Swing	0.97%	

=== 1980 ===
1980 Tamil Nadu Legislative Assembly election: Sriperumbudur
Party	Candidate	Votes	%	±%
INC	D. Yasodha	37,370	52.97%	+40.08
AIADMK	S. Jaganathan	31,341	44.42%	+1.43
JP	T. Ayyavoo	1,842	2.61%	New
Margin of victory		6,029	8.55%	−3.50%
Turnout		70,553	61.16%	−2.45%
Registered electors		1,16,937		
INC gain from AIADMK		Swing	9.97%	

=== 1977 ===
1977 Tamil Nadu Legislative Assembly election: Sriperumbudur
Party	Candidate	Votes	%	±%
AIADMK	N. Krishnan	29,038	43.00%	New
DMK	T. S. Lakshmanan	20,901	30.95%	−28.2
INC	P. Appavoor	8,705	12.89%	−27.97
JP	V. Emperuman	7,953	11.78%	New
Independent	G. B. Govindan	941	1.39%	New
Margin of victory		8,137	12.05%	−6.24%
Turnout		67,538	63.61%	−8.81%
Registered electors		1,08,219		
AIADMK gain from DMK		Swing	-16.15%	

=== 1971 ===
1971 Tamil Nadu Legislative Assembly election: Sriperumbudur
Party	Candidate	Votes	%	±%
DMK	D. Rajarathinam	46,617	59.15%	+5.01
INC	Manali Ramakrishna Mudaliar	32,201	40.85%	−1.68
Margin of victory		14,416	18.29%	6.69%
Turnout		78,818	72.42%	−9.94%
Registered electors		1,11,779		
DMK hold		Swing	5.01%	

=== 1967 ===
1967 Madras Legislative Assembly election: Sriperumbudur
Party	Candidate	Votes	%	±%
DMK	D. Rajarathinam	41,655	54.13%	+6.31
INC	M. Bhaktavatsalam	32,729	42.53%	−7.1
Independent	Guindirathinam	1,640	2.13%	New
Independent	Subramanian	558	0.73%	New
Margin of victory		8,926	11.60%	9.78%
Turnout		76,949	82.37%	7.06%
Registered electors		96,287		
DMK gain from INC		Swing	4.50%	

=== 1962 ===
1962 Madras Legislative Assembly election: Sriperumbudur
Party	Candidate	Votes	%	±%
INC	M. Bhaktavatsalam	33,825	49.64%	−3.41
DMK	Annamalai	32,588	47.82%	New
We Tamils	M. P. Ponnuswamy	1,732	2.54%	New
Margin of victory		1,237	1.82%	−9.71%
Turnout		68,145	75.31%	20.47%
Registered electors		93,368		
INC hold		Swing	-3.41%	

=== 1957 ===
1957 Madras Legislative Assembly election: Sriperumbudur
Party	Candidate	Votes	%	±%
INC	M. Bhaktavatsalam	21,784	53.05%	+18.64
Independent	C. V. M. Annamalai	17,050	41.52%	New
Independent	J. Venkatachala Naicker	1,211	2.95%	New
Independent	G. D. Bagyam	1,018	2.48%	New
Margin of victory		4,734	11.53%	4.26%
Turnout		41,063	54.85%	2.71%
Registered electors		74,870		
INC gain from Independent		Swing	11.38%	

=== 1952 ===
1952 Madras Legislative Assembly election: Sriperumbudur
Party	Candidate	Votes	%	±%
Independent	T. Shanmugham	14,244	41.67%	New
INC	Seshachari	11,761	34.41%	New
KMPP	Devaraja Naicker	4,435	12.98%	New
Socialist	V. Kannappan	3,740	10.94%	New
Margin of victory		2,483	7.26%	
Turnout		34,180	52.13%	
Registered electors		65,563		
Independent win (new seat)				
