= T. A. Elumalai =

Indian politician

T. A. Elumalai is a politician from Tamil Nadu, India. He was elected from the Poonamallee constituency to the Fifteenth Tamil Nadu Legislative Assembly as a member of the All India Anna Dravida Munnetra Kazhagam political party in the 2016 Tamil Nadu legislative assembly elections.

He was one of the 18 members who were disqualified were disqualified by Speaker P. Dhanapal as they withdrew support to Chief Minister Edappadi K. Palaniswami and became loyal to rebel leader T.T.V. Dhinakaran and joined his party Amma Makkal Munnetra Kazhagam.

== Electoral performance ==
2016 Tamil Nadu Legislative Assembly election : Poonamallee
Party	Candidate	Votes	%	±%
AIADMK	T. A. Elumalai	103,952	43.32%	▼11.27
DMK	I. Paranthamen	92,189	38.41%	New
PMK	C. Parthasarathy	15,827	6.59%	New
MDMK	D. Kandan	15,051	6.27%	New
BJP	A. Amarnath	3,456	1.44%	New
NOTA	None of the above	3,265	1.36%	New
BSP	V. Vijayabalaji	2,066	0.86%	New
Margin of victory		11,763	4.90%	▼17.92
Turnout		240,126	76.06%	▲76.06
Total valid votes		239,987		
Rejected ballots		139	0.06%	
Registered electors		315,718		▲37.59
AIADMK hold		Swing	▼11.27	

2019 Tamil Nadu Legislative Assembly By-election : Poonamallee
Party	Candidate	Votes	%	±%
DMK	A. Krishnaswamy	136,905	54.22%	▲15.81
AIADMK	Vaithiyanathan. G	76,809	30.42%	▼12.90
Independent	T. A. Elumalai	14,804	5.86%	New
MNM	Jagadish Kumar. A	11,772	4.66%	New
NOTA	None of the above	3,164	1.25%	▼0.11
Margin of victory		60,096	23.80%	▲18.90
Turnout		255,668	76.92%	▲0.86
Total valid votes		252,504		
Registered electors		332,379		▲5.28
DMK gain from AIADMK		Swing	▲10.90	
