= Poonamallee Assembly constituency =

State Legislative Assembly Constituency in Tamil Nadu

Coordinates: 13.048°N 80.094°E

Poonamallee
- Constituency No. 5 for the Tamil Nadu Legislative Assembly

Constituency details
- Country: India
- Region: South India
- State: Tamil Nadu
- Established: 1977
- Total electors: 368,634
- Reservation: SC

Member of Legislative Assembly
- 17th Tamil Nadu Legislative Assembly
- Incumbent Prakasam. R.
- Party: TVK
- Elected year: 2026

Poonamallee is a state assembly constituency in Tiruvallur district in Tamil Nadu. Its State Assembly Constituency number is 5. The seat is reserved for candidates from the Scheduled Castes. It comprises portions of Poonamallee and Thiruvallur taluks and is a part of Thiruvallur Lok Sabha constituency for national elections to the Parliament of India. It is one of the 234 State Legislative Assembly Constituencies in Tamil Nadu, in India.

== Members of the Legislative Assembly ==
Election	Member	Party
1977	D. Rajarathinam	Dravida Munnetra Kazhagam
1980	D. Rajarathinam	Dravida Munnetra Kazhagam
1984	G. Anantha Krishna	Indian National Congress
1989	T. R. Masilamani	Dravida Munnetra Kazhagam
1991	D. Sudarsanam	Indian National Congress
1996	D. Sudarsanam	Tamil Maanila Congress
2001	S. Shanmugam	Pattali Makkal Katchi
2006	D. Sudarsanam	Indian National Congress
2011	R. Manimaran	All India Anna Dravida Munnetra Kazhagam
2016	T. A. Elumalai	All India Anna Dravida Munnetra Kazhagam
2019 By-election	A. Krishnaswamy	Dravida Munnetra Kazhagam
2021	A. Krishnaswamy	Dravida Munnetra Kazhagam
2026	Prakasam. R.	Tamilaga Vettri Kazhagam

== Election results ==
Vote share of winning candidates
2026	52.22%
2021	57.34%
2019 by-election	53.46%
2016	43.32%
2011	54.59%
2006	48.49%
2001	37.51%
1996	53.20%
1991	55.50%
1989	48.11%
1984	55.97%
1980	48.83%
1977	36.49%

=== 2026 ===
2026 Tamil Nadu Legislative Assembly election : Poonamallee
Party	Candidate	Votes	%	±%
TVK	Prakasam. R.	161,309	52.22%	New
DMK	A. Krishnaswamy	88,569	28.67%	▼28.67
Amma Makkal Munnettra Kazagam	T. A. Elumalai	43,280	14.01%	New
NTK	Mekala. J	11,697	3.79%	▼7.66
NOTA	None of the above	1,571	0.51%	▼0.59
Margin of victory		72,740	23.55%	▼12.53
Turnout		309,019	83.81%	▲10.11
Total valid votes		308,894		
Registered electors		368,694		▲2.92
TVK gain from DMK		Swing	▼5.12	

=== 2021 ===
2021 Tamil Nadu Legislative Assembly election : Poonamallee
Party	Candidate	Votes	%	±%
DMK	A. Krishnaswamy	149,578	57.34%	▲3.12
PMK	S. X. Rajamannar	55,468	21.26%	New
NTK	A. Manimekalai	29,871	11.45%	▲7.14
MNM	J. Revathi Manimegalai	11,927	4.57%	▼0.09
AMMK	T. A. Elumalai	8,805	3.38%	New
BSP	A. C. Sathyamurthy	2,891	1.11%	New
NOTA	None of the above	2,871	1.10%	▼0.15
Margin of victory		94,110	36.08%	▲12.28
Turnout		264,011	73.70%	▼3.22
Total valid votes		260,865		
Rejected ballots		275	0.10%	▲0.10
Registered electors		358,218		▲7.77
DMK hold		Swing	▲3.12	

=== 2019 by-election ===
2019 Tamil Nadu Legislative Assembly By-election : Poonamallee
Party	Candidate	Votes	%	±%
DMK	A. Krishnaswamy	136,905	54.22%	▲15.81
AIADMK	Vaithiyanathan. G	76,809	30.42%	▼12.90
Independent	T. A. Elumalai	14,804	5.86%	New
MNM	Jagadish Kumar. A	11,772	4.66%	New
NTK	Bharathi Priya. P	10,871	4.31%	▲3.24
NOTA	None of the above	3,164	1.25%	▼0.11
Margin of victory		60,096	23.80%	▲18.90
Turnout		255,668	76.92%	▲0.86
Total valid votes		252,504		
Registered electors		332,379		▲5.28
DMK gain from AIADMK		Swing	▲10.90	

=== 2016 ===
2016 Tamil Nadu Legislative Assembly election : Poonamallee
Party	Candidate	Votes	%	±%
AIADMK	T. A. Elumalai	103,952	43.32%	▼11.27
DMK	I. Paranthamen	92,189	38.41%	New
PMK	C. Parthasarathy	15,827	6.59%	New
MDMK	D. Kandan	15,051	6.27%	New
BJP	A. Amarnath	3,456	1.44%	New
NOTA	None of the above	3,265	1.36%	New
NTK	A. Ponnarasu	2,562	1.07%	New
BSP	V. Vijayabalaji	2,066	0.86%	New
Margin of victory		11,763	4.90%	▼17.92
Turnout		240,126	76.06%	▲76.06
Total valid votes		239,987		
Rejected ballots		139	0.06%	
Registered electors		315,718		▲37.59
AIADMK hold		Swing	▼11.27	

=== 2011 ===
2011 Tamil Nadu Legislative Assembly election : Poonamallee
Party	Candidate	Votes	%	±%
AIADMK	R. Manimaran	99,097	54.59%	New
INC	Kanchi G. V. Mathiazhagan	57,678	31.77%	▼16.72
Puratchi Bharatham	M. Jaganmoorthy	21,118	11.63%	New
Independent	K. Murali	2,022	1.11%	New
IJK	P. Theinmathi	1,616	0.89%	New
Margin of victory		41,419	22.82%	▲15.30
Total valid votes		181,531		
Rejected ballots		202	0.00%	
Registered electors		229,460		▼31.76
AIADMK gain from INC		Swing	▲6.10	

=== 2006 ===
2006 Tamil Nadu Legislative Assembly election : Poonamallee
Party	Candidate	Votes	%	±%
INC	D. Sudarsanam	98,920	48.49%	New
MDMK	R. Senguttuvan	83,590	40.98%	▲30.35
DMDK	G. Chandrasekar	15,711	7.70%	New
BJP	N. Manoharan	2,062	1.01%	New
Independent	A. G. Jothimani	1,432	0.70%	New
Margin of victory		15,330	7.52%	▲6.12
Turnout		204,112	60.70%	▲6.56
Total valid votes		203,991		
Registered electors		336,248		▲9.76
INC gain from PMK		Swing	▲10.98	

=== 2001 ===
2001 Tamil Nadu Legislative Assembly election : Poonamallee
Party	Candidate	Votes	%	±%
PMK	S. Shanmugam	62,220	37.51%	▲29.97
DMK	S. Chezhiyan	59,904	36.12%	New
Puratchi Bharatham	M. Moorthy	21,194	12.78%	New
MDMK	R. Andhridoss	17,628	10.63%	▼5.54
Independent	B. Ramaiah Naidu	2,146	1.29%	New
Independent	A. Ashokan	1,827	1.10%	New
Margin of victory		2,316	1.40%	▼34.08
Turnout		165,864	54.14%	▼7.28
Total valid votes		165,860		
Registered electors		306,344		▲25.79
PMK gain from TMC(M)		Swing	▼15.69	

=== 1996 ===
1996 Tamil Nadu Legislative Assembly election : Poonamallee
Party	Candidate	Votes	%	±%
TMC(M)	D. Sudarsanam	75,731	53.20%	New
INC	P. Krishnamoorthy	25,220	17.72%	▼37.78
MDMK	Anarias @ Anthridoss	23,011	16.17%	New
PMK	E. Ravi	10,739	7.54%	▲1.42
Independent	V. Ravi	3,397	2.39%	New
BJP	V. G. Karunagaran	1,956	1.37%	▼0.14
Margin of victory		50,511	35.48%	▲15.88
Turnout		149,570	61.42%	▲1.96
Total valid votes		142,348		
Registered electors		243,536		▲14.57
TMC(M) gain from INC		Swing	▼2.30	

=== 1991 ===
1991 Tamil Nadu Legislative Assembly election : Poonamallee
Party	Candidate	Votes	%	±%
INC	D. Sudarsanam	68,392	55.50%	▲31.43
DMK	D. Rajarathinam	44,240	35.90%	▼12.21
PMK	R. K. Kothandan	7,544	6.12%	New
BJP	V. Sampath	1,866	1.51%	New
Margin of victory		24,152	19.60%	▼4.43
Turnout		126,397	59.46%	▼7.81
Total valid votes		123,225		
Registered electors		212,565		▲15.42
INC gain from DMK		Swing	▲7.39	

=== 1989 ===
1989 Tamil Nadu Legislative Assembly election : Poonamallee
Party	Candidate	Votes	%	±%
DMK	T. R. Masilamani	58,640	48.11%	▲6.93
INC	G. Anantha Krishna	29,345	24.07%	▼31.90
Independent	M. Moorthy	13,429	11.02%	New
Independent	R. Goverdhanan	8,932	7.33%	New
AIADMK	Era. Kulasekaran	6,657	5.46%	New
Independent	R. Murugesan	1,678	1.38%	New
Independent	S. Muruganandam	813	0.67%	New
Independent	Somusa	790	0.65%	New
Margin of victory		29,295	24.03%	▲9.24
Turnout		123,888	67.27%	▲0.30
Total valid votes		121,900		
Registered electors		184,163		▲21.35
DMK gain from INC		Swing	▼7.86	

=== 1984 ===
1984 Tamil Nadu Legislative Assembly election : Poonamallee
Party	Candidate	Votes	%	±%
INC	G. Anantha Krishna	55,129	55.97%	New
DMK	D. Rajarathinam	40,562	41.18%	▼7.65
Independent	S. Subramani	1,150	1.17%	New
Margin of victory		14,567	14.79%	▲0.55
Turnout		101,638	66.97%	▲10.24
Total valid votes		98,506		
Registered electors		151,761		▲9.13
INC gain from DMK		Swing	▲7.14	

=== 1980 ===
1980 Tamil Nadu Legislative Assembly election : Poonamallee
Party	Candidate	Votes	%	±%
DMK	D. Rajarathinam	38,018	48.83%	▲12.34
GKC	Sambandan	26,930	34.59%	New
Independent	Poovai P. Chinnasamy	8,547	10.98%	New
Independent	M. Moorthy	2,246	2.88%	New
BJP	G. Thiruven Gadam	1,605	2.06%	New
Independent	T. Lakshmipathy Naidu	514	0.66%	New
Margin of victory		11,088	14.24%	▲7.52
Turnout		78,888	56.73%	▲4.97
Total valid votes		77,860		
Registered electors		139,060		▼2.92
DMK hold		Swing	▲12.34	

=== 1977 ===
1977 Tamil Nadu Legislative Assembly election : Poonamallee
Party	Candidate	Votes	%	±%
DMK	D. Rajarathinam	26,552	36.49%	New
AIADMK	Era. Kulasekaran	21,659	29.76%	New
JP	J. Madan Raj	16,660	22.89%	New
INC	A. Palapandvan	7,357	10.11%	New
Margin of victory		4,893	6.72%	
Turnout		74,148	51.76%	
Total valid votes		72,774		
Registered electors		143,250		
DMK win (new seat)				
