= Chengam Assembly constituency =

State Legislative Assembly Constituency in Tamil Nadu

Coordinates: 12.3°N 78.8°E

Chengam
- Constituency No. 62 for the Tamil Nadu Legislative Assembly

Constituency details
- Country: India
- Region: South India
- State: Tamil Nadu
- District: Tiruvannamalai
- Lok Sabha constituency: Tiruvannamalai
- Established: 1951
- Total electors: 2,69,423
- Reservation: SC

Member of Legislative Assembly
- 17th Tamil Nadu Legislative Assembly
- Incumbent T. S. Velu
- Party: AIADMK
- Alliance: NDA
- Elected year: 2026

Chengam is a state assembly constituency in Tiruvannamalai district in Tamil Nadu, India. Its State Assembly Constituency number is 62. The seat is reserved for candidates from the Scheduled Castes and comprises a portion of Chengam taluk. It is a part of Tiruvannamalai Lok Sabha constituency for national elections to the Parliament of India. It is one of the 234 State Legislative Assembly Constituencies in Tamil Nadu, in India.

== Members of the Legislative Assembly ==
Election	Member	Party
1952	Ramaswami Gounder	Commonweal Party
1957	T. Karia Goundar	Indian National Congress
1962	C. K. Chinnaraji	Dravida Munnetra Kazhagam
1967	P. S. Santhanam	Dravida Munnetra Kazhagam
1971	C. Pandurangam	Dravida Munnetra Kazhagam
1977	T. Swamikannu	All India Anna Dravida Munnetra Kazhagam
1980	T. Swamikannu	All India Anna Dravida Munnetra Kazhagam
1984	T. Swamikannu	All India Anna Dravida Munnetra Kazhagam
1989	M. Settu	Janata Party
1991	P. Veera Pandiyan	All India Anna Dravida Munnetra Kazhagam
1996	K. V. Nannan	Dravida Munnetra Kazhagam
2001	Polur Varadhan	Indian National Congress
2006	Polur Varadhan	Indian National Congress
2011	T. Sureshkumar	Desiya Murpokku Dravida Kazhagam
2016	M. P. Giri	Dravida Munnetra Kazhagam
2021	M. P. Giri	Dravida Munnetra Kazhagam
2026	S. Velu	All India Anna Dravida Munnetra Kazhagam

Madras State

== Election results ==
Vote share of winning candidates
2026	36.15%
2021	48.73%
2016	45.6%
2011	46.9%
2006	42.75%
2001	48.43%
1996	59.11%
1991	59.31%
1989	34.74%
1984	61.42%
1980	48.06%
1977	46.36%
1971	61.39%
1967	56.84%
1962	55.22%
1957	56.44%
1952	36.86%

=== 2026 ===
2026 Tamil Nadu Legislative Assembly election : Chengam
Party	Candidate	Votes	%	±%
AIADMK	S. Velu	87,802	36.15%	New
TVK	K. Bharathidhasan	74,524	30.68%	New
DMK	M. P. Giri	70,346	28.96%	▼19.54
NTK	J. Shoba	6,335	2.61%	▼2.81
NOTA	None of the above	1,114	0.46%	▼0.03
Margin of victory		13,278	5.47%	▲0.28
Turnout		243,703	90.45%	▲8.65
Total valid votes		242,897		
Registered electors		269,423		▼2.18
AIADMK gain from DMK		Swing	▼12.35	

=== 2021 ===
2021 Tamil Nadu Legislative Assembly election : Chengam
Party	Candidate	Votes	%	±%
DMK	M. P. Giri	108,081	48.50%	▲2.90
AIADMK	M. S. Nainakannu	96,511	43.30%	▲3.73
NTK	S. Vennila	12,080	5.42%	▲5.10
DMDK	S. Anbu	2,769	1.24%	▼2.57
NOTA	None of the above	1,085	0.49%	▼0.18
Margin of victory		11,570	5.19%	▼0.84
Turnout		225,298	81.80%	▼2.40
Total valid votes		222,865		
Registered electors		275,419		▲10.16
DMK hold		Swing		

=== 2016 ===
2016 Tamil Nadu Legislative Assembly election : Chengam
Party	Candidate	Votes	%	±%
DMK	M. P. Giri	95,939	45.60%	New
AIADMK	M. Dinagaran	83,248	39.57%	New
PMK	C. Murugan	15,114	7.18%	New
DMDK	A. Kalaiarasi	8,007	3.81%	▼43.14
NOTA	None of the above	1,403	0.67%	New
Margin of victory		12,691	6.03%	▼0.42
Turnout		210,517	84.20%	▼0.07
Total valid votes		210,403		
Rejected ballots		114	0.05%	▲0.02
Registered electors		250,015		▲18.12
DMK gain from DMDK		Swing	▼1.35	

=== 2011 ===
2011 Tamil Nadu Legislative Assembly election : Chengam
Party	Candidate	Votes	%	±%
DMDK	T. Sureshkumar	83,722	46.95%	▲34.29
INC	K. Selvaperunthagai	72,225	40.50%	▼2.25
Independent	R. Sureshkumar	8,543	4.79%	
BJP	A. Jayaraman	4,465	2.50%	▼0.71
Independent	R. Kumar	2,511	1.41%	
IJK	M. Mani	1,670	0.94%	New
BSP	A. V. Subramanian	1,636	0.92%	▼1.19
Independent	K. Sankar	1,364	0.76%	
Independent	T. Suresh	1,347	0.76%	
Margin of victory		11,497	6.45%	▼1.72
Turnout		178,371	84.27%	▲13.00
Total valid votes		178,325		
Rejected ballots		46	0.03%	▲0.03
Registered electors		211,656		▲20.84
DMDK gain from INC		Swing	▲4.20	

=== 2006 ===
2006 Tamil Nadu Legislative Assembly election : Chengam
Party	Candidate	Votes	%	±%
INC	Polur Varadhan	53,366	42.75%	▼5.68
VCK	P. Sakthivel	43,166	34.58%	New
DMDK	T. Suresh	15,808	12.66%	New
BJP	V. Thiruppathi	4,009	3.21%	New
BSP	R. Jaganathan	2,631	2.11%	New
Independent	V. Ramasamy	2,576	2.06%	
SP	R. Shamala	1,792	1.44%	New
Independent	B. Saroja	1,494	1.20%	
Margin of victory		10,200	8.17%	▼2.81
Turnout		124,843	71.27%	▲6.85
Total valid votes		124,842		
Registered electors		175,158		▲0.83
INC hold		Swing		

=== 2001 ===
2001 Tamil Nadu Legislative Assembly election : Chengam
Party	Candidate	Votes	%	±%
INC	Polur Varadhan	54,145	48.43%	New
Makkal Tamil Desam	R. Shamala	41,868	37.45%	New
Independent	K. Munusamy	4,788	4.28%	
MDMK	A. Marimuthu	4,780	4.28%	New
Independent	S. Muthammal	2,401	2.15%	
JD(U)	P. Anbalagan	2,218	1.98%	New
JD(S)	M. Settu	1,597	1.43%	New
Margin of victory		12,277	10.98%	▼15.72
Turnout		111,908	64.42%	▼2.56
Total valid votes		111,797		
Rejected ballots		111	0.10%	▼5.05
Registered electors		173,711		▲10.88
INC gain from DMK		Swing	▼10.68	

=== 1996 ===
1996 Tamil Nadu Legislative Assembly election : Chengam
Party	Candidate	Votes	%	±%
DMK	K. V. Nannan	58,958	59.11%	New
AIADMK	C. K. Thamizharasan	32,325	32.41%	New
Independent	C. Raji	4,645	4.66%	
JD	M. Settu	3,086	3.09%	▼15.37
Margin of victory		26,633	26.70%	▼14.15
Turnout		104,933	66.98%	▼0.55
Total valid votes		99,747		
Rejected ballots		5,403	5.15%	▼0.75
Registered electors		156,671		▲8.11
DMK gain from AIADMK		Swing	▼0.20	

=== 1991 ===
1991 Tamil Nadu Legislative Assembly election : Chengam
Party	Candidate	Votes	%	±%
AIADMK	P. Veera Pandiyan	54,611	59.31%	New
JD	K. Munusamy	16,994	18.46%	New
PMK	M. Annappan	11,283	12.25%	New
Independent	T. Swamikannu	7,056	7.66%	
BJP	K. Kesavalu	1,109	1.20%	New
Margin of victory		37,617	40.85%	▲35.67
Turnout		97,856	67.53%	▲7.12
Total valid votes		92,081		
Rejected ballots		5,775	5.90%	▲2.93
Registered electors		144,912		▲12.38
AIADMK gain from JP		Swing	▲24.57	

=== 1989 ===
1989 Tamil Nadu Legislative Assembly election : Chengam
Party	Candidate	Votes	%	±%
JP	M. Settu	26,256	34.74%	▲6.51
AIADMK	P. Veerapandiyan	22,344	29.56%	New
INC	Jaya Arumugam	13,020	17.23%	New
AIADMK	T. Swamikannu	11,363	15.03%	New
Independent	L. Anandan	1,393	1.84%	
Independent	P. Dhanapal	990	1.31%	
Margin of victory		3,912	5.18%	▼28.01
Turnout		77,898	60.41%	▼11.83
Total valid votes		75,584		
Rejected ballots		2,314	2.97%	▼4.85
Registered electors		128,945		▲15.23
JP gain from AIADMK		Swing	▼26.68	

=== 1984 ===
1984 Tamil Nadu Legislative Assembly election : Chengam
Party	Candidate	Votes	%	±%
AIADMK	T. Swamikannu	45,770	61.42%	▲13.36
JP	P. Anbalagan	21,039	28.23%	New
Independent	A. Kannan	4,721	6.34%	
Independent	N. Vattaru	2,615	3.51%	
Margin of victory		24,731	33.19%	▲31.69
Turnout		80,841	72.24%	▲17.12
Total valid votes		74,520		
Rejected ballots		6,321	7.82%	▲6.13
Registered electors		111,906		▲8.65
AIADMK hold		Swing		

=== 1980 ===
1980 Tamil Nadu Legislative Assembly election : Chengam
Party	Candidate	Votes	%	±%
AIADMK	T. Swamikannu	26,823	48.06%	New
INC	A. Arumugam	25,987	46.56%	New
Independent	P. Arumugam	3,006	5.39%	
Margin of victory		836	1.50%	▼20.70
Turnout		56,773	55.12%	▲3.17
Total valid votes		55,816		
Rejected ballots		957	1.69%	▲0.15
Registered electors		102,993		▲7.16
AIADMK gain from AIADMK		Swing	▲1.70	

=== 1977 ===
1977 Tamil Nadu Legislative Assembly election : Chengam
Party	Candidate	Votes	%	±%
AIADMK	T. Swamikannu	22,789	46.36%	New
DMK	N. Poosanar	11,877	24.16%	▼37.23
JP	P. Anbalagan	8,094	16.47%	New
CPI	D. Raja	4,492	9.14%	New
Independent	P. Dhanapal	1,478	3.01%	
Independent	A. Jaya Arumugam	317	0.64%	
Margin of victory		10,912	22.20%	▼7.40
Turnout		49,928	51.95%	▼14.95
Total valid votes		49,158		
Rejected ballots		770	1.54%	▲1.54
Registered electors		96,111		▲13.61
AIADMK gain from DMK		Swing	▼15.03	

=== 1971 ===
1971 Tamil Nadu Legislative Assembly election : Chengam
Party	Candidate	Votes	%	±%
DMK	C. Pandurangam	32,260	61.39%	▲4.55
INC	A. Arumugam	16,705	31.79%	New
Independent	A. Ramasamy	3,586	6.82%	
Margin of victory		15,555	29.60%	▲8.53
Turnout		56,597	66.90%	▼2.78
Total valid votes		52,551		
Registered electors		84,601		▲7.80
DMK hold		Swing		

=== 1967 ===
1967 Madras State Legislative Assembly election : Chengam
Party	Candidate	Votes	%	±%
DMK	P. S. Santhanam	29,828	56.84%	▲1.62
INC	A. Arumugham	18,773	35.77%	▼4.40
Independent	P. Dhanapal	1,927	3.67%	
RPI	R. Kanniah	1,425	2.72%	New
Independent	C. K. Manickam	524	1.00%	
Margin of victory		11,055	21.07%	▲6.03
Turnout		54,684	69.68%	▼4.59
Total valid votes		52,477		
Registered electors		78,478		▼9.91
DMK hold		Swing		

=== 1962 ===
1962 Madras State Legislative Assembly election : Chengam
Party	Candidate	Votes	%	±%
DMK	C. K. Chinnaraji Gounder	34,374	55.22%	New
INC	Y. Shanmugam	25,008	40.17%	▼16.27
Independent	Thammaya Dass	1,350	2.17%	
Independent	Manickam	1,082	1.74%	
Independent	K. S. Rathnavel	440	0.71%	
Margin of victory		9,366	15.04%	▼5.40
Turnout		64,691	74.27%	▲27.99
Total valid votes		62,254		
Registered electors		87,108		▲13.33
DMK gain from INC		Swing	▼1.22	

=== 1957 ===
1957 Madras State Legislative Assembly election : Chengam
Party	Candidate	Votes	%	±%
INC	T. Karia Goundar	20,079	56.44%	▲32.25
Independent	R. Venkatachala Mudaliar	12,806	36.00%	
Independent	E. Venkatachala Mudaliar	2,691	7.56%	
Margin of victory		7,273	20.44%	▲7.78
Turnout		35,576	46.28%	▼5.69
Total valid votes		35,576		
Registered electors		76,865		▲9.76
INC gain from Commonweal Party		Swing	▲19.58	

=== 1952 ===
1952 Madras State Legislative Assembly election : Chengam
Party	Candidate	Votes	%	±%
Commonweal Party	Ramaswami Gounder	13,413	36.86%	New
INC	Muthukrishna Chettiar	8,804	24.19%	New
Justice Party	Rengaswami Reddiar	7,434	20.43%	New
CPI	Ramaswami	6,741	18.52%	New
Margin of victory		4,609	12.66%	
Turnout		36,392	51.97%	
Total valid votes		36,392		
Registered electors		70,029		
Commonweal Party win (new seat)				
