= K. V. Nannan =

Indian politician

K. V. Nannan was elected to the Tamil Nadu Legislative Assembly from the Chengam constituency, which is reserved for candidates from the Scheduled Castes, in the 1996 elections. He was a candidate of the Dravida Munnetra Kazhagam (DMK) party.

== Electoral performance ==
Election	Constituency	Political party	Result	Vote %	Opposition			Ref
Election	Constituency	Political party	Result	Vote %	Candidate	Political party	Vote %	Ref
1996	Chengam	DMK	Won	59.11%	C. K. Thamizharasan	AIADMK	32.41%	
