= SPSP =

SPSP is a four-letter initialism that may refer to:

- Single-pair shortest path, in approaches to the shortest path problem
- Society for Personality and Social Psychology, an academic society for psychologists
- Sony PlayStation Portable, a handheld game console
- São Paulo, São Paulo (city, state; analogous to New York, New York)
- Sas Plus/Sas Pussy, EP by Karpe
