= A. Krishnaswamy =

Indian politician

Member of the Tamil Nadu Legislative Assembly
- In office 23 May 2019 – 4 May 2026
- Preceded by: T. A. Ezhumalai
- Constituency: Poonamallee

Member of Parliament, Lok Sabha for Sriperumbudur
- In office 6 October 1999 — 16 May 2009
- Preceded by: K. Venugopal
- Succeeded by: T. R. Balu

Personal details
- Born: 12 December 1965 (age 60) Triuvellore, Tamil Nadu
- Party: DMK
- Spouse: Malathy
- Children: 1 Daughter
- As of 22 September, 2006

A. Krishnaswamy (born 12 December 1965) was a member of the 14th Lok Sabha of India. He represented the Sriperumbudur constituency of Tamil Nadu and is a member of the Dravida Munnetra Kazhagam (DMK) political party.

== Electoral performance ==
Election	Party	Constituency Name	Result	Votes gained	Vote share%
2021	Dravida Munnetra Kazhagam	Poonamallee	Won	149,578	57.34%
2016	Dravida Munnetra Kazhagam	Poonamallee	Won	136,905	53.46%
2004	Dravida Munnetra Kazhagam	Sriperumbudu	Won	517,617	61.39%
1999	Dravida Munnetra Kazhagam	Sriperumbudu	Won	385,558	52.88%
