= D. Sudarsanam =

Indian politician

D. Sudarsanam (1941/42 – 26 June 2010) was an Indian politician and Member of the Legislative Assembly of Tamil Nadu.He has three sons Amaranth, Gopinath and Aravind. He has two grandsons Pranav chitta and Ishaan raghav and four granddaughters Shivani, Jyoshita, Advaitha and Aarika.

== Early political life as Congress MLA ==
He was elected to the Tamil Nadu legislative assembly from Poonamallee constituency as an Indian National Congress candidate in 1991 election, and as a Tamil Maanila Congress (Moopanar) candidate in 1996 election.

== Tamil Maanila Congress ==
He supported G. K. Moopanar when he split from the Indian National Congress to form the Tamil Maanila Congress. He was made the Treasurer of the party. He was elected from Tiruvallur constituency as a Tamil Maanila Congress (Moopanar) candidate in the 2001 election. He remained with TMC till its merger with Congress.

== Congress Legislature party leader ==
He was elected as an Indian National Congress candidate in 2006 election. He served as the leader of the Congress in Tamil Nadu legislature after the 2006 election and served as acting speaker of Tamil Nadu Legislative Assembly.

== Death ==
He died of multiple organ failure in a hospital in Coimbatore. He became ill and was admitted to the hospital while attending the 2010 world Tamil conference. He was 68 when he died and is survived by his three sons.
