= 1996 Tamil Nadu Legislative Assembly election =

Indian election

- 27 April 1996 (150 Seats); 2 May 1996 (83 Seats); 1 June 1996 (1 Seat)

All 234 seats in the Legislature of Tamil Nadu 118 seats needed for a majority
- Turnout: 66.95% (▲3.11%)
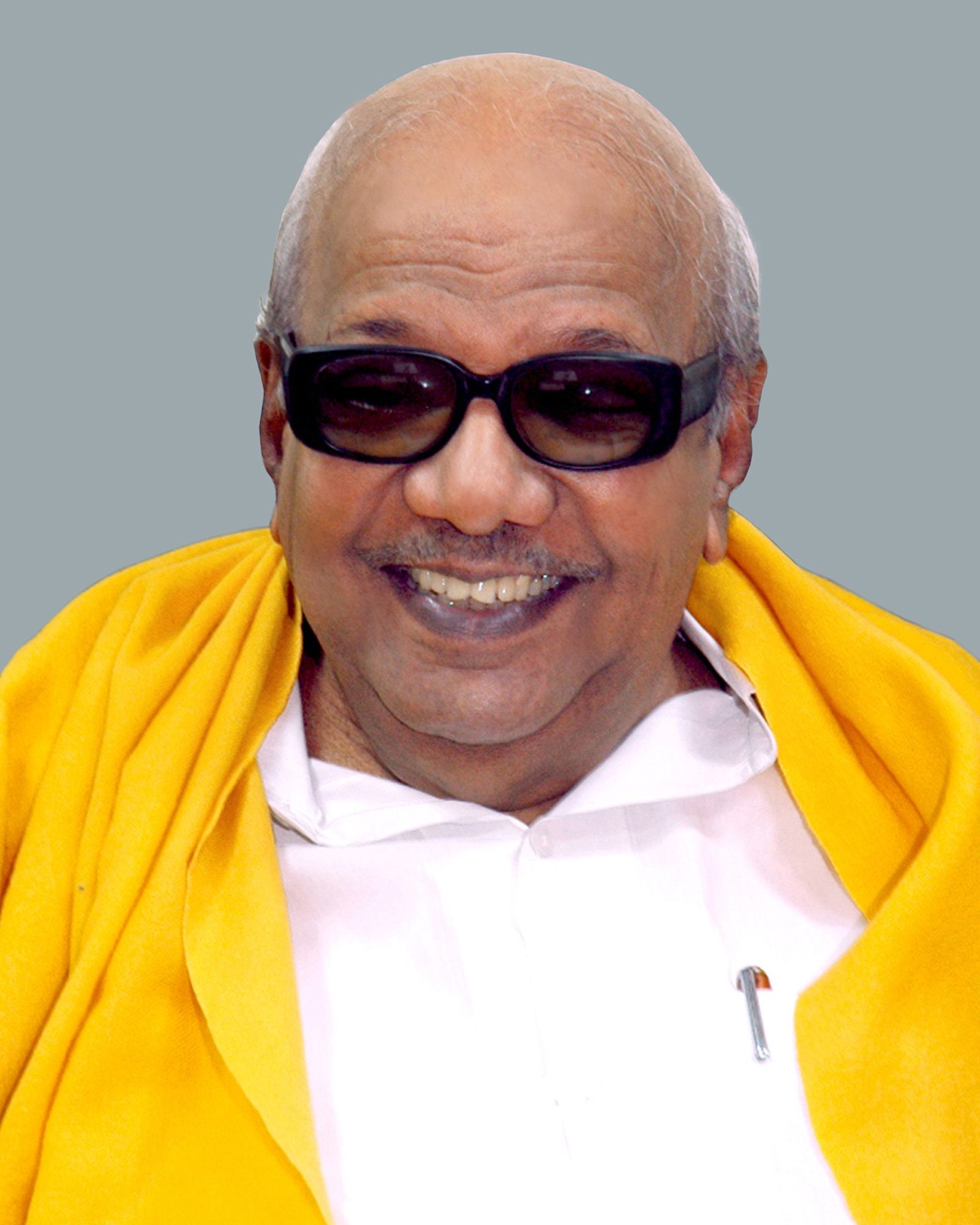

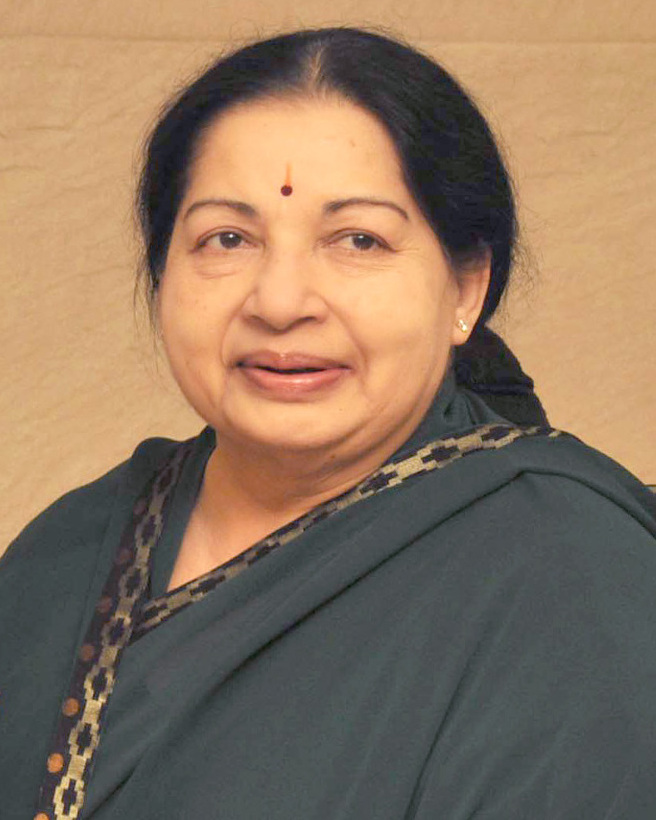
	First party	Second party
Leader	M. Karunanidhi	J. Jayalalithaa
Party	DMK	AIADMK
Alliance	United Front	Congress alliance
Leader's seat	Chepauk	Bargur (lost)
Seats won	173	4
Seat change	▲171	▼160
Popular vote	11,423,380	5,831,383
Percentage	42.07%	21.47%
Swing	▲19.57%	▼22.93%
Alliance seats	221	4
Alliance seat change	▲214	▼221
Alliance popular vote	14,600,748	7,354,723
Alliance percentage	53.77%	27.08%
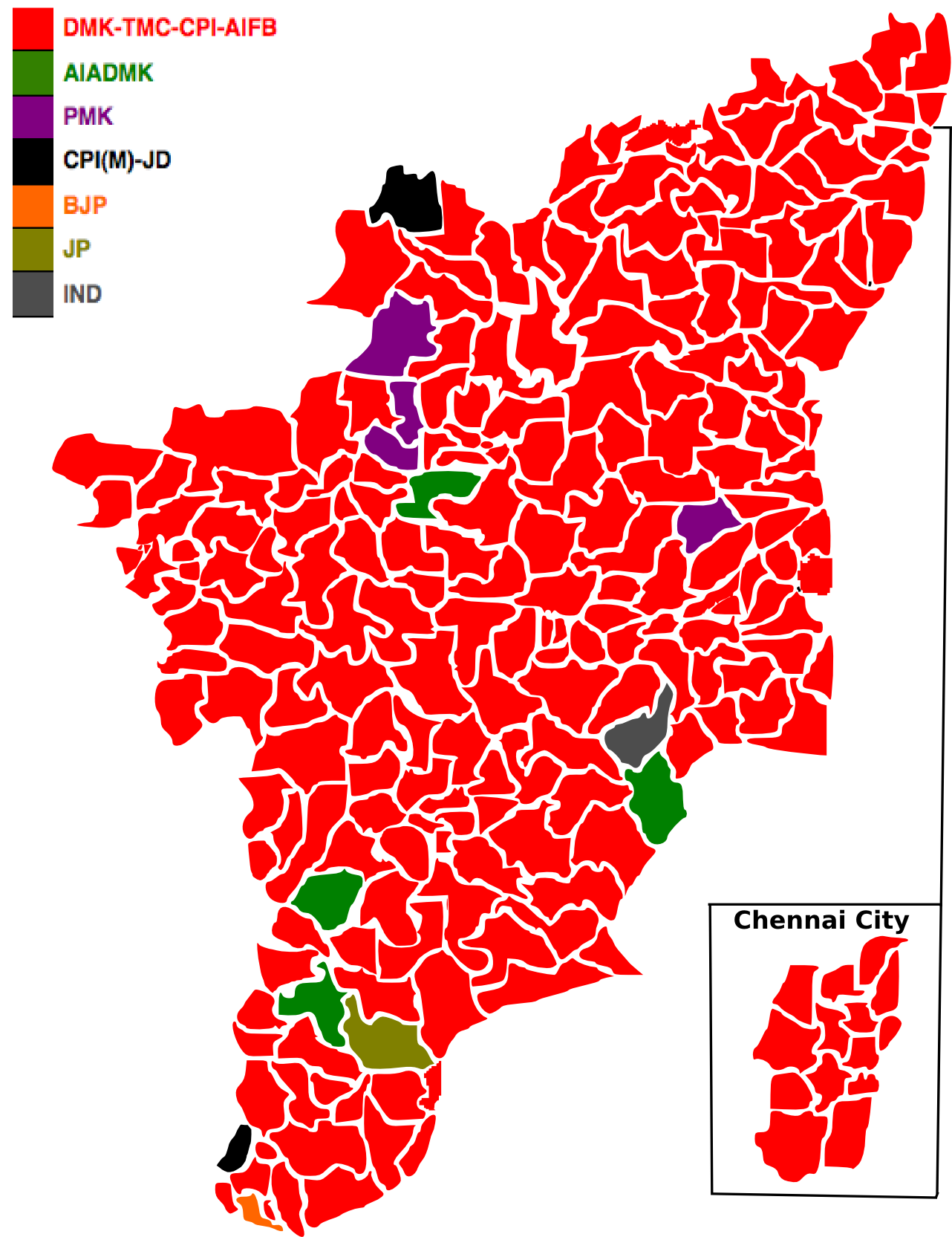
- 1996 election map (by constituencies)

- Alliance wise Result
Chief Minister before election
J. Jayalalithaa
AIADMK
Elected Chief Minister
M. Karunanidhi
DMK

The eleventh legislative assembly election of Tamil Nadu was held on two phases 27 April and 2 May 1996 to elect members from 234 constituencies for the state legislature. The Dravida Munnetra Kazhagam (DMK) led front won the election securing 221 seats in the 234 seat Tamil Nadu Legislative Assembly, and its leader M. Karunanidhi, became the chief minister.

In the tenth Tamil Nadu assembly, All India Anna Dravida Munnetra Kazhagam (AIADMK) held the majority with its leader J. Jayalalithaa as the chief minister. The elections resulted in a landslide defeat for the incumbent government, with the AIADMK winning only four seats. Outgoing chief minister Jayalalithaa lost the election from the Bargur, and became the first incumbent chief minister since M. Bakthavatsalam in 1967 to lose the elections.

== Election Schedule ==
Poll event	Phases		
Poll event	I	II	III
Notification date	27 March 1996		
Last date for filing nomination	3 April 1996		
Scrutiny of nomination	4 April 1996		
Last date for withdrawal of nomination	6 April 1996		
Date of poll	27 April 1996	2 May 1996	1 June 1996
Number of constituencies	150	83	1 (Note: Elecrion were postponed in Modakkurichi constituency, as it had 1033 candidates (a huge number in Indian History), created Administrative Difficulties.)
Date of counting of votes	8 May 1996		4 June 1996

== Background ==
=== Anti-Incumbency ===
The J. Jayalalithaa led All India Anna Dravida Munnetra Kazhagam (AIADMK) government, which had been in power since 1991 was beset with corruption scandals and public discontent. A series of corruption scandals, a growing reputation for high handedness and an extravagant public wedding for Jayalalithaa's foster son Sudhakaran all combined to erode the AIADMK support base and the goodwill she had enjoyed with the electorate in the 1991 elections.

During the election campaign, Jayalalithaa and the ruling AIADMK candidates faced hostile reactions in several constituencies. On 11 April 1996, at Usilampatti, a slipper was reportedly thrown at Jayalalithaa and her vehicle was stoned. In Theni, Finance Minister V. R. Nedunchezhiyan was prevented from entering parts of his constituency, with similar incidents reported elsewhere. In response, Jayalalithaa intensified attacks on Karunanidhi, accusing him of being anti-woman, anti-national, and politically destabilising.

=== Formation of TMC ===
The AIADMK's alliance with Indian National Congress (INC), which had helped it to win the 1991 elections ran into trouble midway through the AIADMK's term. J. Jayalalithaa terminated the alliance and Congress served as the principal opposition party in the Tamil Nadu Legislative Assembly. When the 1996 elections drew closer, it was expected that the Congress would contest the elections in alliance with the DMK. However against the wishes of the Tamil Nadu state unit of the Congress, the national congress leader (and then Indian prime minister) P. V. Narasimha Rao announced that the Congress would ally with the AIADMK. This led to a split in the Tamil Nadu Congress with a majority of the party workers and cadre forming the Tamil Maanila Congress (TMC) led by G. K. Moopanar. The TMC contested the elections in alliance with the DMK.

=== Formation of MDMK ===
In 1993, the DMK suffered a split when one of its more prominent second rung leaders, Vaiko was expelled from the party membership. The next year Vaiko floated a new party – the Marumalarchi Dravida Munnetra Kazhagam (MDMK).

=== Coalitions ===
There were four main coalitions in the 1996 elections. The DMK-TMC front which also included the Communist Party of India (CPI) and the AIADMK-Congress front were the main political groupings in the state. Both fronts had a number of smaller parties as constituents. The Indian National League and the All India Forward Bloc were part of the DMK front, while the AIADMK front also had Muslim Leagues, Forward Block, All India Republic Party, Uzhavar Uzhaippalar Katchi and United Communist Party. Apart from these two fronts, there was a MDMK led coalition which included the Communist Party of India (Marxist) (CPM), the Janata Dal (JD) and the Samajwadi Janata Party (SJP). The alliance between Pattali Makkal Katchi (PMK) and All India Indira Congress (Tiwari) (Tiwari Congress) led by Vazhappady Ramamurthy was the fourth coalition that contested the elections. Initially, before the TMC was formed, the DMK put together a seven party alliance comprising itself, PMK, CPI, Tiwari Congress and a few other parties. However, this alliance fell through when the Tiwari Congress and PMK left the front after differences between Karunanidhi and Ramamurthy. After this, Cho Ramaswamy (editor of Thuglak) played a vital role in bringing together the DMK-TMC coalition and obtaining actor Rajinikanth's support for it. There were a few other smaller political formations and parties contesting the election – the Bharatiya Janata Party (BJP) contested the elections alone; Subramanian Swamy's Janata Party contested in alliance with the caste organisation Devendra Kula Velalar Sangam led by Dr. K. Krishnasamy.

=== Rajinikanth's support ===
The DMK-TMC alliance enlisted the popular Tamil film actor Rajinikanth to campaign against the AIADMK in the elections. Rajinikanth declared his support for the DMK-TMC combine and members of his numerous fan clubs campaigned for the DMK front across Tamil Nadu. In a widely watched campaign appearance broadcast in Sun TV, he declared "even God cannot save Tamil Nadu if AIADMK returns to power".Rajinikanth's support gave enormous victory to DMK

=== Highlights ===
In the Modakurichi Assembly constituency of Erode district, a record 1,033 candidates, comprising 1,005 men and 28 women, contested the election, leading the ECI to postpone polling by a month. The delay was necessitated by the allocation of election symbols, the resolution of related disputes, and the printing of an extensive ballot booklet. While polling across the rest of Tamil Nadu was held on 2 May, voting in Modakurichi took place on 1 June 1996, where voters faced difficulty in locating their preferred symbols.

== Seat allotments ==
=== United Front ===
DMK-led Alliance
Party	Flag	Symbol	Leader	Seats	
Dravida Munnetra Kazhagam			M. Karunanidhi	176	182
Indian National League			M. Abdul Latheif	5	182
All India Forward Bloc			L. Santhanam	1	182
Tamil Maanila Congress			G. K. Moopanar	40	
Communist Party of India			R. Nallakannu	11	
All India Forward Bloc			P. N. Vallarasu	1	
Total				234	

=== Congress Front ===
AIADMK-led Alliance
Party	Flag	Symbol	Leader	Seats	
All India Anna Dravida Munnetra Kazhagam			J. Jayalalithaa	163	168
Indian Union Muslim League			K. M. Kader Mohideen	2	168
Uzhavar Uzhaippalar Katchi				1	168
Republican Party of India			C. K. Thamizharasan	1	168
Forward Bloc (Rebellion)			S. Andi Thevar	1	168
Indian National Congress			Kumari Anandan	64	
Independent (Note: Initially he was announced as a candidate of Papanasam constituency from Tiwari Congress, but he joined in Congress during scrutiny of nomination, so his form-B to allot hand symbol was rejected, he was allotted (Independent) car symbol from the ECI.)			R. Thirunavukkarasar	1	
Total				233	

=== People's Democratic Front ===
People's Democratic Front
Party	Flag	Symbol	Leader	Seats	
Marumalarchi Dravida Munnetra Kazhagam			Vaiko	175	177
Samajwadi Party (Note: ECI had allotted cycle symbol to TMC, so it had contested on MDMK symbol.)			Mulayam Singh Yadav	2	177
Janata Dal			Ram Vilas Paswan	39 + 1 (Note: Friendly Contest on Thalli between CPM and Janata Dal)	
Communist Party of India (Marxist)			N. Sankaraiah	15 + 1	
Total				232	

=== PMK-Tiwari Congress Front ===
PMK-led Alliance
Party	Flag	Symbol	Leader	Seats
Pattali Makkal Katchi			Dr. Ramdoss	116
All India Indira Congress (Tiwari)			Vazhappady Ramamurthy	46
Human Rights Party of India			L. Elayaperumal	2
Total				164

== List of Candidates ==
Constituency		DMK+		AIADMK+		MDMK+	
#	Name	Party	Candidate	Party	Candidate	Party	Candidate
1	Royapuram	DMK	R. Mathivanan	ADMK	D. Jayakumar	MDMK	S. Mohan
2	Harbour	DMK	K. Anbazhagan	INC	Paul Earnest	MDMK	H. Basheer Ahamed
3	Dr. R. K. Nagar	DMK	S. P. Sarguna	ADMK	R. M. D. Raveendran	MDMK	G. V. Siva
4	Park Town	DMK	T. Rajendar	INC	S. V. Shankar	MDMK	Kootharasan
5	Perambur (SC)	DMK	Chengai Sivam	ADMK	V. Neelakandan	CPM	R. Sarala
6	Purasawalkam	TMC	B. Ranganathan	INC	J. Gnanam Kathipara	JD	G. Ethirajan
7	Egmore (SC)	DMK	Parithi Ilamvazhuthi	INC	N. Lakshmi	MDMK	M. Kanniappan
8	Anna Nagar	DMK	N. Arcot Veeraswami	INC	R. Balasubramanian	CPM	K. Varadarajan
9	Theagaraya Nagar	TMC	A. Chellakumar	ADMK	S. Vijayan	JD	K. Jagaveera Pandian
10	Thousand Lights	DMK	M. K. Stalin	ADMK	Zeenath Sheriffdeen	MDMK	K. Thiyagarajan
11	Chepauk	DMK	M. Karunanidhi	INC	N. S. S. Nellai Kannan	JD	S. K. Doraiswamy
12	Triplicane	DMK	K. Manoharan	ADMK	A. Wahab (Note: Indian Union Muslim League contested on the "Two Leaves" symbol of the All India Anna Dravida Munnetra Kazhagam (AIADMK), and is officially recorded as a AIADMK candidate in electoral records.)	MDMK	O. Sundaram
13	Mylapore	DMK	N. P. Ramajayam	ADMK	T. K. Sampath	JD	K. S. Srinivasan
14	Saidapet	DMK	K. Saidai Kittu	ADMK	Saidai Duraisamy	MDMK	M. R. Panneerselvam
15	Gummidipundi	DMK	K. Venu	ADMK	R. S. Munirathinam	MDMK	M. Natarajan
16	Ponneri (SC)	DMK	K. Sundaram	ADMK	G. Gunasekaran	MDMK	R. Krishnamoorthy
17	Thiruvottiyur	DMK	T. C. Vijayan	ADMK	B. Balraj	CPM	A. Soundararajan
18	Villivakkam	TMC	J. M. Aaroon Rashid	INC	M. G. Mohan	MDMK	M. Venugopal
19	Alandur	DMK	C. Shanmugam	ADMK	K. Purushothaman	MDMK	Vijaya Thayanban
20	Tambaram	DMK	M. A. Vaithyalingam	INC	K. B. Madhavan	MDMK	K. Somasundaram
21	Tirupporur (SC)	DMK	G. Chockalingam	ADMK	N. K. Loganathan	MDMK	E. Sathiyaseelan
22	Chengalpattu	DMK	V. Tamilmani	ADMK	C. V. N. Kumarasamy	MDMK	N. Radhakrishnan
23	Maduranthakam	DMK	S. K. Venkatesan	ADMK	S. D. U. Kamchand	MDMK	K. R. Veeraraghavan
24	Acharapakkam (SC)	DMK	S. Mathivanan	ADMK	A. Boovaraghamoorthy	JD	A. V. Nagarajan
25	Uthiramerur	DMK	K. Sundar	ADMK	N. K. Gnanasekaran	MDMK	K. P. Janakiraman
26	Kancheepuram	DMK	P. Murugesan	ADMK	S. S. Thirunavukkarasu	CPM	Y. M. Narayanasamy
27	Sriperumbudur (SC)	DMK	E. Kothandam	INC	K. N. Chinnandi	MDMK	V. Sampath
28	Poonamallee	TMC	D. Sudarsanam	INC	P. Krishnamoorthy	MDMK	Anarias Anthridoss
29	Tiruvallur	DMK	C. S. Mani	ADMK	G. Kanagaraaj	MDMK	D. Gajendran
30	Tiruttani	DMK	E. A. P. Sivaji	ADMK	G. Hari	MDMK	Narasimhan
31	Pallipet	TMC	E. S. S. Raman	INC	B. Thangavel	MDMK	K. S. Athyaraj
32	Arkonam (SC)	DMK	R. Thamizh Chelvan	INC	D. Yasodha	MDMK	A. Kesavan
33	Sholinghur	TMC	A. M. Munirathinam	INC	R. Jayababu	MDMK	R. Shanmugham
34	Ranipet	DMK	R. Gandhi	ADMK	M. Masilamani	MDMK	J. Hassain
35	Arcot	DMK	P. N. Subramani	ADMK	K. V. Ramadoss	MDMK	K. S. Natarajan
36	Katpadi	DMK	Durai Murugan	ADMK	K. Pandurangan	CPM	T. R. Purushothaman
37	Gudiyatham	DMK	V. G. Dhanapal	INC	S. Ramgopal	MDMK	N. Panneer
38	Pernambut (SC)	DMK	V. Govindan	ADMK	I. Tamizharasan	JD	R. S. J. Ashok Ilayaraja
39	Vaniayambadi	DMK	M. Abdul Lathief (Note: Indian National League contested on the "Rising Sun" symbol of the Dravida Munnetra Kazhagam (DMK), and is officially recorded as a DMK candidate in electoral records.)	INC	K. Kuppusamy	JD	K. Jayapal
40	Natrampalli	DMK	R. Mahendran	ADMK	H. D. Hanumanthan	MDMK	K. Rajendran
41	Tiruppattur	DMK	G. Shanmugam	ADMK	P. G. Mani	MDMK	K. C. Alagiri
42	Chengam (SC)	DMK	K. V. Nannan	ADMK	C. K. Thamizharasan (Note: Republican Party of India contested on the "Two Leaves" symbol of the All India Anna Dravida Munnetra Kazhagam (AIADMK), and is officially recorded as a AIADMK candidate in electoral records.)	JD	M. Settu
43	Thandarambattu	TMC	K. Manivarma	ADMK	A. P. Kuppusamy	MDMK	V. Jhayabal
44	Tiruvannamalai	DMK	K. Pitchandi	INC	A. Arunachalam	MDMK	T. Elango
45	Kalasapakkam	DMK	P. S. Thiruvengadam	INC	M. Sundarasami	MDMK	S. Arivalagan
46	Polur	DMK	A. Rajendran	ADMK	Agri Krishnamurthy	MDMK	A. Karthikeyan
47	Anaicut	DMK	C. Gopu	ADMK	C. M. Suryakala	MDMK	N. M. Murugesan
48	Vellore	TMC	C. Gnanasekharan	INC	S. B. Bhaskaran	MDMK	N. Subramani
49	Arni	DMK	R. Sivanandam	ADMK	M. Chinnakulamdai	MDMK	D. Dhakshinamoorthy
50	Cheyyar	DMK	V. Anbalagan	ADMK	P. Chandran	MDMK	R. Ramalingam
51	Vandavasi (SC)	DMK	Bala Anandan	ADMK	V. Gunaseelan	MDMK	V. Rajagopal
52	Peranamallur	DMK	N. Pandurangan	ADMK	C. Srinivasan		
53	Melmalayanur	DMK	A. Gnanasekar	INC	Dharmarasan	MDMK	R. Panchatcharan
54	Gingee	DMK	T. Natarajan	INC	T. N. Muruganandam	MDMK	N. Ramachandran
55	Tindivanam	DMK	R. Sedunathan	INC	D. Rajaram	MDMK	R. Masilamani
56	Vanur (SC)	DMK	A. Marimuthu	ADMK	S. P. Erasendiran	MDMK	K. Manjini
57	Kandamangalam (SC)	DMK	S. Alaguvelu	ADMK	V. Subramanian	MDMK	P. Venkatachalapathy
58	Villupuram	DMK	K. Ponmudy	ADMK	S. S. Panneerselvam	MDMK	M. Panneerselvam
59	Mugaiyur	DMK	A. G. Sampath	ADMK	T. M. Arangarathan	MDMK	P. Rajagopal
60	Thirunavalur	DMK	A. J. Manikannan	ADMK	K. G. P. Gnanamoorthy	MDMK	A. V. Balasubramaniyan
61	Ulundurpet (SC)	DMK	A. Mani	ADMK	M. Anandan	MDMK	K. Angamuthu
62	Nellikuppam	DMK	A. Mani	ADMK	M. C. Dhamodaran	MDMK	V. Krishnamoorthi
63	Cuddalore	DMK	E. Pugazhendi	INC	K. V. Rajendiran	MDMK	S. Padmanaban
64	Panruti	DMK	V. Ramaswamy	ADMK	R. Rajendran	MDMK	K. Nandagopalakrishnan
65	Kurinjipadi	DMK	M. R. K. Panneerselvam	ADMK	N. Pandarinathan	CPM	K. Balakrishnan
66	Bhuvanagiri	DMK	A. V. Abdul Naser	ADMK	P. M. Rasavel	MDMK	D. Anbarasan
67	Kattumannarkoil (SC)	DMK	E. Ramalingam	ADMK	R. Kousalya	MDMK	Kanagasabai Muthu
68	Chidambaram	TMC	K. S. Alagiri	INC	A. Radhakrishnan	MDMK	Durai Krishnamoorthy
69	Vridhachalam	DMK	K. Tamizharasan	ADMK	C. Ramanathan	MDMK	M. M. Srinivasan
70	Mangalore (SC)	TMC	S. Puratchimani	INC	V. M. S. Saravanakumar	MDMK	G. Soundararajan
71	Rishivandiam	TMC	S. Sivaraj	ADMK	P. Annadurai	MDMK	N. Durairaj
72	Chinnasalem	DMK	R. Mookappan	ADMK	P. Mohan	MDMK	K. Venkatapathy
73	Sankarapuram	DMK	T. Udhayasuriyan	ADMK	A. Saruvar Kasim	CPM	M. Chinnappa
74	Hosur	TMC	T. Venkata Reddy	INC	K. Gopinath	JD	B. Venkatasamy
75	Thalli	CPI	S. Raja Reddy	INC	Venkatarama Reddy	CPM	M. Lagumiah (Note: Constituency 75 (Thalli): In addition to the CPI(M) candidate listed, there was also a JD candidate, B. Ramachandra Reddi, who secured the 6th position in MDMK-led alliance)
76	Kaveripattinam	DMK	P. V. S. Venkatesan	ADMK	K. P. Munusamy	MDMK	V. C. Govindasamy
77	Krishnagiri	DMK	K. Kamalanathan	ADMK	K. P. Kathavarayan	MDMK	K. R. Pandiyan
78	Bargur	DMK	E. G. Sugavanam	ADMK	J. Jayalalitha	MDMK	K. Viswanathan
79	Harur (SC)	DMK	Vedammal	INC	J. Natesan	CPM	P. Shanmugam
80	Morappur	DMK	V. Mullaivendhan	ADMK	K. Singaram	MDMK	R. Ravanan
81	Palacode	DMK	G. L. Venkatachalam	ADMK	C. Gopal	MDMK	G. V. Madhaiyan
82	Dharmapuri	DMK	K. Manoharan	INC	Mase Harur	MDMK	K. Devarajan
83	Pennagaram	CPI	M. Arumugam	ADMK	R. Anbalagan	MDMK	K. E. Sekar
84	Mettur	DMK	P. Gopal	ADMK	P. Soundram	CPM	M. Rajagopal
85	Taramangalam	DMK	P. Elavarasan	INC	R. Palanisamy	MDMK	P. Kandasamy
86	Omalur	TMC	R. R. Sekaran	ADMK	C. Krishnan	MDMK	A. Sundaram
87	Yercaud (ST)	DMK	V. Perumal	ADMK	R. Gunasekaran	JD	R. Kuppusamy
88	Salem-I	DMK	K. R. G. Dhanapalan	INC	A. T. Natarajan	MDMK	T. Ravikrishnan
89	Salem-II	DMK	A. L. Thangavel	ADMK	S. Semmalai	MDMK	Thamarai Kannan
90	Veerapandi	DMK	S. Arumugam	ADMK	K. Arjunan	MDMK	Anbu Rajendran
91	Panamarathupatty	DMK	S. R. Sivalingam	ADMK	P. Vijayalakshmi	MDMK	E. Manickam
92	Attur	DMK	A. M. Ramasamy	ADMK	A. K. Murugesan	MDMK	M. Manoharan
93	Talavasal (SC)	TMC	K. Rani	INC	K. Kaliaperumal	MDMK	M. Singaravel
94	Rasipuram	DMK	R. R. Damayandhi	ADMK	P. R. Sundaram	MDMK	B. A. R. Elangovan
95	Sendamangalam (ST)	DMK	C. Chandrasekaran	ADMK	K. Kalavathi	MDMK	S. Thennavan
96	Namakkal (SC)	DMK	K. Velsamy	ADMK	S. Anbaiagan	MDMK	R. Mayavan
97	Kapilamalai	DMK	K. K. Veerappan	ADMK	R. Rajalingam	MDMK	M. Kandasamy
98	Tiruchengode	DMK	T. P. Arumugam	ADMK	S. Chinnusamy	CPM	A. Athi Narayanan
99	Sankari (SC)	DMK	V. Muthu	ADMK	K. K. Ramasamy	CPM	C. Duraisamy
100	Edapadi	DMK	P. A. Murugesan	ADMK	K. Palaniswami	MDMK	G. Anbumathi Selvan
101	Mettupalayam	DMK	B. Arunkumar	ADMK	K. Doraiswamy	MDMK	T. T. Arangasamy
102	Avanashi (SC)	DMK	G. Elango	ADMK	M. Thiagarajan	MDMK	R. Shanmuga Sundharam
103	Thondamuthur	DMK	C. R. Ramachandran	ADMK	T. Malaravan	CPM	U. K. Vellingiri
104	Singanallur	DMK	N. Palaniswamy	ADMK	R. Duraisamy	MDMK	M. Kannappan
105	Coimbatore West	DMK	C. T. Dhandapani	INC	Raja Thangavel	MDMK	S. Govindharajan
106	Coimbatore East	TMC	V. K. Lakshmanan	INC	R. S. Velan	CPM	K. C. Karunakaran
107	Perur	DMK	A. Natarajan	ADMK	R. Thirumalaisamy	CPM	N. Amirtham
108	Kinathukkadavu	DMK	M. Shanmugham	ADMK	K. M. Mylswamy	MDMK	K. Kandasamy
109	Pollachi	DMK	S. Raju	ADMK	V. Jayaraman	MDMK	Andu Nachimuthu
110	Valparai (SC)	DMK	V. P. Singaravelu	ADMK	Kurichimanimaran	MDMK	A. Tamilvanan
111	Udumalpet	DMK	D. Selvaraj	ADMK	C. Shanmugavelu	MDMK	R. T. Mariappan
112	Dharapuram (SC)	DMK	R. Saraswathy	ADMK	P. Easwaramurthi	MDMK	K. Mayavan
113	Vellakoil	DMK	M. P. Saminathan	ADMK	Dhurai Ramaswamy	MDMK	V. N. Shanmugam
114	Pongalur	TMC	P. Mohan Kandaswamy	INC	Thalapathy Murugesan	MDMK	P. R. Selvaraj
115	Palladam	DMK	S. S. Ponmudi	ADMK	K. S. Duraimurugan	MDMK	A. Ku. Palanisamy
116	Tiruppur	CPI	K. Subbarayan	ADMK	C. Sivasamy	MDMK	S. Duraisamy
117	Kangayam	DMK	N. S. Rajkumar	ADMK	N. Ramasamy	MDMK	K. Periyasamy
118	Modakurichi	DMK	Subbulakshmi	ADMK	R. N. Kittusamy	MDMK	K. Elanchezhian
119	Perundurai	CPI	N. Periyasamy	ADMK	P. Periyasamy	MDMK	V. M. Kandasamy
120	Erode	DMK	N. K. K. Periasamy	ADMK	S. Muthusamy	MDMK	A. Ganeshamurthi
121	Bhavani	TMC	S. N. Balasubramanian	ADMK	K. S. Manivannan	CPM	P. Palanisamy
122	Andhiyur (SC)	DMK	P. Selvarasu	ADMK	M. Subramaniam	MDMK	Eradha Rukmani
123	Gobichettipalayam	DMK	G. P. Venkidu	ADMK	K. A. Sengottaiyan	MDMK	K. R. Kalathinathan
124	Bhavanisagar	DMK	V. A. Andamuthu	ADMK	V. K. Chinnasamy	MDMK	T. K. Subramaniam
125	Sathyamangalam	DMK	S. K. Rajendran	ADMK	T. R. Attiannan	CPM	A. M. Kadar
126	Coonoor (SC)	DMK	N. Thangavel	ADMK	S. Karuppusamy	MDMK	S. Selvaraj
127	Ootacamund	DMK	T. Gundan	INC	H. M. Raju	JD	N. Chickiah
128	Gudalur	DMK	B. M. Mubarak	ADMK	K. R. Raju	CPM	N. Vasu
129	Palani (SC)	DMK	T. Poovendhan	ADMK	P. Karuppuchamy	CPM	A. Nagarajan
130	Oddanchatram	DMK	R. Sakkarapani	ADMK	K. Sellamuthu	MDMK	T. Mohan
131	Periyakulam	DMK	L. Mookaiah	ADMK	K. M. Kader Mohideen	MDMK	O. Rajangam
132	Theni	TMC	N. R. Alagaraja	ADMK	V. R. Nedunchezhiyan	MDMK	G. Ponnu Pillai
133	Bodinayakkanur	DMK	A. Sudalaimuthu	ADMK	S. P. Jeyakumar	MDMK	R. Subramani
134	Cumbum	TMC	O. R. Ramachandran	INC	K. A. Somasundaram	CPM	S. Dharmaraj
135	Andipatti	DMK	P. Aasiyan	ADMK	A. Muthiah	MDMK	Sekar Balasundaram
136	Sedapatti	DMK	G. Thalapathi	ADMK	R. Muthiah	MDMK	Pon. Muthuramalingam
137	Thirumangalam	DMK	M. Muthuramalingam	ADMK	S. Andi Thevar (Note: Andi Thevar-led Forward Bloc contested on the "Two Leaves" symbol of the All India Anna Dravida Munnetra Kazhagam (AIADMK), and is officially recorded as a AIADMK candidate in electoral records.)	MDMK	R. Saminathan
138	Usilampatti	AIFB	P. N. Vallarasu	ADMK	P. Veluchamy		
139	Nilakottai (SC)	TMC	A. S. Ponnammal	INC	A. Rasu	MDMK	M. Arivazhaghan
140	Sholavandan	DMK	L. Santhanam (Note: All India Forward Bloc contested on the "Rising Sun" symbol of the Dravida Munnetra Kazhagam (DMK), and is officially recorded as a DMK candidate in electoral records.)	ADMK	A. M. Paramasivan	MDMK	P. S. Manian
141	Tirupparankundram	DMK	C. Ramachandran	ADMK	S. V. Shanmugam	CPM	K. Kandasamy
142	Madurai West	DMK	Palanivel Rajan	INC	R. Muthusamy	JD	K. John Moses
143	Madurai Central	TMC	A. Deivanayagam	INC	T. Thangaraj	CPM	N. Nanmaran
144	Madurai East	DMK	V. Velusamy	ADMK	T. R. Janardhanan	MDMK	V. Muniyandi
145	Samayanallur (SC)	DMK	S. Selvaraj	ADMK	R. Raja Selvaraj	MDMK	P. Pandiammal
146	Melur	TMC	K. V. V. Rajamanickam	INC	C. R. Sundararajan	MDMK	Veera Ilavarasan
147	Natham	TMC	M. Andi Ambalam	INC	S. Asai Alangaram	MDMK	P. Chellam
148	Dindigul	DMK	R. Manimaran	ADMK	V. Marutharaj	CPM	R. S. Rejendran
149	Athoor	DMK	I. Periyasamy	ADMK	C. Chinnamuthu	CPM	K. Nagalakshmi
150	Vedasandur	DMK	S. V. Krishnan	ADMK	S. Gandhirajan	MDMK	V. P. Balasubramanian
151	Aravakurichi	DMK	S. S. Md. Ismail	ADMK	V. K. Duraisamy	MDMK	P. Monjanur Ramasamy
152	Karur	DMK	Vasuki Murugesan	ADMK	M. Chinnasamy	MDMK	R. Palanisamy
153	Krishnarayapuram (SC)	DMK	S. Nagarathinam	ADMK	A. Arivalagan	CPM	S. Thirunavukkarasu
154	Marungapuri	DMK	B. M. Senguttuvan	ADMK	K. Solairaj	MDMK	A. Durairaj
155	Kulithalai	DMK	R. Selvam	ADMK	A. Pappa Sundaram	MDMK	R. Pugalendhi
156	Thottiam	DMK	K. Kannaiyan	ADMK	N. Nedumaran	MDMK	E. P. Rathinam
157	Uppiliapuram (ST)	DMK	T. Karuppusami	ADMK	R. Saroja	MDMK	P. Rajendran
158	Musiri	DMK	M. N. Jothi	ADMK	C. Mallika Chinnasamy	MDMK	N. Selvaraj
159	Lalgudi	DMK	K. N. Nehru	INC	J. Logambal	MDMK	Pon. Pandian
160	Perambalur (SC)	DMK	M. Devarajan	ADMK	S. Murugesan	MDMK	M. Vibushnan
161	Varahur (SC)	DMK	B. Duraisamy	ADMK	A. Palanimuthu	JD	M. Palanimuthu
162	Ariyalur	TMC	D. Amaramoorthy	ADMK	A. Elavarasan	MDMK	K. Chinnappa
163	Andimadam	DMK	Sivasubramaniyan	INC	Arthur Hellar	MDMK	Ramalingam
164	Jayankondam	DMK	K. C. Ganesan	INC	N. Masilamani	MDMK	Dhana Sekhar
165	Srirangam	DMK	T. P. Mayavan	ADMK	M. Paranjothi	MDMK	Perur Dharmalingam
166	Tiruchirapalli-I	DMK	B. Paranikumar	ADMK	Pa. Krishnan	MDMK	A. Malarmannan
167	Tiruchirapalli-II	DMK	Anbil Poyyamozhi	ADMK	P. Selvaraj	CPM	G. Vijayalakshmi
168	Thiruverambur	DMK	K. Durai	ADMK	T. Rathinavel	CPM	Mohamed Ali
169	Sirkali (SC)	DMK	M. Panneerselvam	ADMK	V. Bharathi	MDMK	R. Senthilselvan
170	Poompuhar	DMK	G. Mohandasan	ADMK	N. Vijayabalan	MDMK	S. M. Samsudeen
171	Mayuram	TMC	M. M. S. Abul Hassan	INC	Rama Chidambaram	MDMK	M. Mahalingam
172	Kuttalam	DMK	P. Kalayanam	ADMK	M. Rajendran	MDMK	R. Rajamanickam
173	Nannilam (SC)	TMC	Padma	ADMK	K. Gopal	CPM	P. Thangaiyan
174	Tiruvarur (SC)	DMK	Nagai Asokan	INC	P. Arumuga Pandian	CPM	S. Veerasamy
175	Nagapattinam	DMK	G. Nizamudeen	ADMK	R. Jeevanantham	CPM	V. Marimuthu
176	Vedaranyam	DMK	S. K. Vedarathinam	INC	P. C. V. Balasubramaniam	MDMK	M. Meenakshi
177	Tiruthuraipundi (SC)	CPI	G. Palanisamy	INC	K. Gopalsami	CPM	P. N. Thangarasu
178	Mannargudi	CPI	V. Sivapunniam	ADMK	K. Kaliyaperumal	MDMK	P. Tamilarasan
179	Pattukkottai	DMK	P. Balasubramanian	ADMK	Seeni Baskaran	MDMK	G. Renganathan
180	Peravurani	TMC	S. V. T. Sambandam	INC	K. Sakthivel	MDMK	M. K. Lenin
181	Orathanad	DMK	P. Rajamanickam	ADMK	V. Suriyamoorthy	MDMK	L. Ganesan
182	Thiruvonam	DMK	M. Ramachandran	ADMK	K. Thangamuthu	MDMK	Durai Balakrishnan
183	Thanjavur	DMK	S. N. M. Ubayadullah	ADMK	S. D. Somasundaram	MDMK	K. Veluchamy
184	Tiruvaiyaru	DMK	Durai Chandrasekaran	ADMK	M. Subramanian	CPM	V. Jeevakumar
185	Papanasam	TMC	N. Karuppanna Odayar	IND	R. Thirunavukkarasu	MDMK	K. Arumugham
186	Valangiman (SC)	DMK	Gomathi Srinivasan	ADMK	V. Vivekanandan	CPM	M. Malathi
187	Kumbakonam	DMK	Ko. Si. Mani	ADMK	Rama Ramanathan	MDMK	V. Kaliaperumal
188	Thiruvidaimarudur	DMK	S. Ramalingam	INC	T. R. Loganathan	MDMK	R. Murugan
189	Thirumayam	TMC	V. Chinniah	ADMK	S. Regupathy	MDMK	R. Pavanan
190	Kolathur (SC)	DMK	Selvaraj Kavithaipithan	ADMK	A. Karuppayee	MDMK	R. Gunasekaran
191	Pudukkottai	DMK	A. Periannan	INC	S. C. Swaminathan	MDMK	V. N. Mani
192	Alangudi	CPI	S. Erasasekaran	ADMK	V. P. Raman	MDMK	K. Chandrasekaran
193	Arantangi	DMK	S. Shanmugam	ADMK	Su. Thirunavukkarasar	MDMK	A. B. R. Janardhanan
194	Tiruppattur	DMK	R. Sivaraman	ADMK	S. Kannappan	MDMK	S. Sevanthiappan
195	Karaikudi	TMC	N. Sundaram	ADMK	M. Raju	MDMK	K. R. Asokan
196	Tiruvadanai	TMC	K. R. Ramasamy	INC	D. Sakthivel	MDMK	M. Mangaleswaran
197	Ilayangudi	DMK	M. Tamilkudimagan	ADMK	V. D. Nadarajan	MDMK	V. Malaikannan
198	Sivaganga	DMK	Tha. Kiruttinan	ADMK	K. R. Muruganandam	MDMK	Peri Krishnan
199	Manamadurai (SC)	CPI	K. Thangamani	ADMK	M. Gunasekaran	CPM	K. Balasubramanian
200	Paramakudi (SC)	DMK	U. Thisaiveeran	ADMK	S. Sundararaj	MDMK	T. K. Siraimeetan
201	Ramanathapuram	DMK	A. Rahman Khan	ADMK	S. K. G. Sekar	MDMK	K. Singaraj
202	Kadaladi	DMK	Suba Thangavelan	ADMK	V. Sathiamoorthy	MDMK	A. Piraanavanathan
203	Mudukulathur	TMC	S. Balakrishnan	INC	R. Nagalingam	MDMK	P. Villi Thevar
204	Aruppukottai	DMK	V. Thangapandian	ADMK	K. Sundarapandian	MDMK	R. M. Shanmugasundaram
205	Sattur	DMK	K. M. Vijayakumar	ADMK	Sattur Ramachandran	MDMK	M. Gnanaprakasam
206	Virudhunagar	DMK	A. R. R. Seenivasan	INC	G. Karikolraj	MDMK	B. Boopathirajaram
207	Sivakasi	TMC	R. Chokkar	ADMK	N. Alagarsamy	MDMK	R. Gnanadoss
208	Srivilliputhur	CPI	T. Ramasamy	ADMK	R. Thamaraikani	MDMK	M. Sivasubramanian
209	Rajapalayam (SC)	DMK	V. P. Rajan	ADMK	P. Prabakar	MDMK	T. S. Tirumalaikumar
210	Vilathikulam	DMK	K. Ravisankar	ADMK	N. K. Perumal	MDMK	Vaiko
211	Ottapidaram (SC)	DMK	S. Sundaram	ADMK	S. Paulraj	MDMK	A. S. Ganesan
212	Koilpatti	CPI	L. Ayyalusamy	ADMK	L. Radhakrishnan	MDMK	K. S. Radhakrishnan
213	Sankaranayanarkoil (SC)	DMK	S. Rasiah Raja	ADMK	C. Karuppasamy	MDMK	S. Thangavelu
214	Vasudevanallur (SC)	TMC	R. Eswaran	INC	P. Suresh Babu	CPM	R. Krishnan
215	Kadayanallur	DMK	K. Naina Md.	ADMK	A. M. Gani	MDMK	M. Sanjeevi
216	Tenkasi	TMC	K. Ravi Arunan	INC	Aladi Sankaraiya	MDMK	Asan Ibrahim
217	Alangulam	DMK	Aladi Aruna	INC	M. S. Kamaraj	MDMK	M. P. Murugiah
218	Tirunelveli	DMK	A. L. Subramanian	ADMK	Karuppasamy Pandian	MDMK	M. Achiyur Mani
219	Palayamcottai	DMK	Md. Kodar Maideen	ADMK	P. Dharmalingam	MDMK	M. S. Sudarsan
220	Cheranmahadevi	TMC	P. Veldurai	ADMK	M. R. Janarthanan	CPM	S. K. Palanichamy
221	Ambasamudram	DMK	R. Avudaiyappan	ADMK	R. Murugaiah Pandian	MDMK	K. Meena Zacharias
222	Nanguneri	CPI	S. V. Krishnan	ADMK	A. S. A. Karunakaran	MDMK	R. Vamadevan
223	Radhapuram	TMC	M. Appavu	INC	S. K. Chandrasekaran	MDMK	M. Raymond
224	Sattangulam	TMC	S. S. Mani Nadar	INC	B. Kasianantham	JD	P. S. Sivasubramanian
225	Tiruchendur	DMK	S. Jennifer Chandran	ADMK	T. Thamotharan	MDMK	D. Ramachandran
226	Srivaikuntam	DMK	S. David Selvyn	INC	S. Daniel Raj	CPM	Thirugnana Sambantham
227	Tuticorin	DMK	N. Periasamy	ADMK	R. Henry	MDMK	T. S. M. Sampath Kumar
228	Kanniyakumari	DMK	N. Suresh Rajan	ADMK	S. Thanu Pillai	MDMK	S. Ramiah Pillai
229	Nagercoil	TMC	M. Moses	INC	V. Seluvai Antony	MDMK	S. Retnaraj
230	Colachel	DMK	Era Bernard	INC	A. Pauliah	MDMK	R. Sambath Chandra
231	Padmanabhapuram	DMK	Bala Janathipathy	ADMK	K. Lawrence	CPM	S. Noor Md.
232	Thiruvattar	DMK	V. Alban			CPM	J. Hemachandran
233	Vilavancode	DMK	V. Thankaraj	INC	M. Sundardas	CPM	D. Moni
234	Killiyoor	TMC	D. Kumaradas	INC	A. Selvaraj	JD	Mano Thangaraj

== Opinion poll trends ==
In the 1996 election, strong anti-incumbency against Jayalalithaa and the strength of the Dravida Munnetra Kazhagam – Tamil Maanila Congress alliance made their victory predictable. A poll by India Today with Prannoy Roy and Dorab R. Sopariwala projected 11–37 seats for the AIADMK, but it won only four.

A survey conducted by the CSDS in collaboration with NDTV and Frontline found that 60% of the electorate was “not satisfied at all” with then incumbent Jayalalithaa regime, while only 13% reported being “very satisfied.”

== Voting and results ==
Polling took place on 2 May 1996 for 233 Assembly constituencies and results were announced on 12 May. The Election to Modakurichi Assembly of Erode district had been postponed due to the contest of 1033 csndidates. The turnout among registered voters was 66.95%. The assembly elections were held simultaneously along with the 1996 Indian general election.

=== Results by Pre-Poll Alliance ===
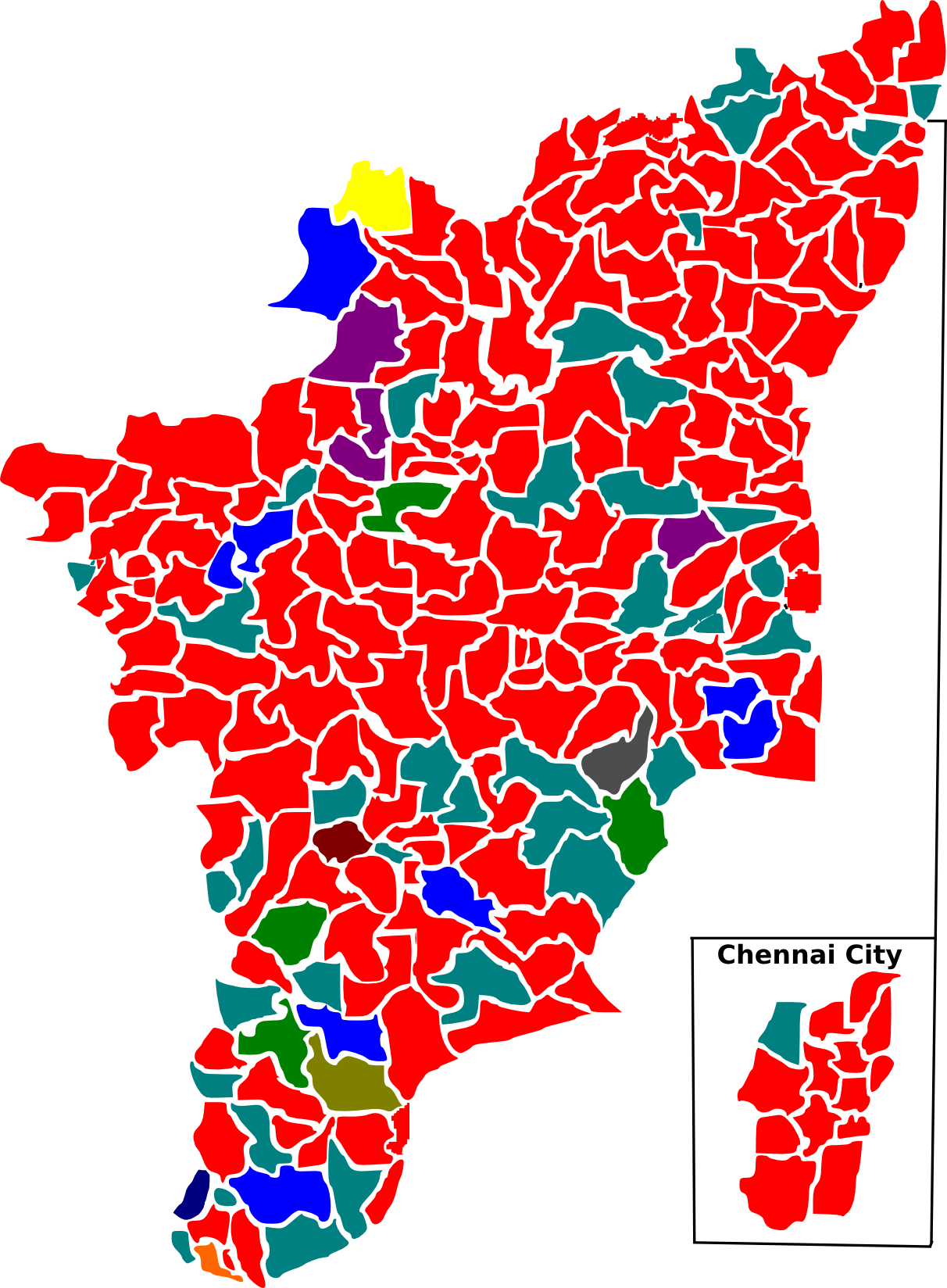
Election map of results based on parties. Colours are based on the results table on the left

Summary of the 1996 June Tamil Nadu Legislative Assembly election results
Alliance/Party	Seats won	Change	Popular Vote	Vote %	Adj. %^{‡}
DMK+ Alliance	221	+214	14,600,748	53.77%	
DMK	173	+171	11,423,380	42.07%	54.04%
TMC(M)	39	+39	2,526,474	9.3%	55.21%
CPI	8	+7	575,570	2.12%	42.95%
AIFB	1	+1	75,324	0.28%	76.18%
AIADMK+ alliance	4	-221	7,354,723	27.08%	
AIADMK	4	-160	5,831,383	21.47%	29.24%
INC	0	-60	1,523,340	5.61%	21.09%
MDMK+ alliance	2	0	2,143,141	7.89%	
MDMK	0	0	1,569,168	5.78%	7.6%
CPI(M)	1	0	456,712	1.68%	9.57%
JD	1	0	117,801	0.43%	7.31%
PMK+ Alliance	4	+3	1,252,275	4.61%	
PMK	4	+3	1,042,333	3.84%	7.61%
AIIC(T)	0	0	209,942	0.77%	4.23%
Others	3	+1	1,662,926	6.12%	
BJP	1	+1	490,453	1.81%	2.93%
JP	1	+1	150,134	0.55%	2.51%
IND	1	0	1,022,339	3.76%	3.8%
Total	234	–	27,154,721	100%	

=== Results by District (Party Wise) ===
District	Seats				
District	Seats	DMK	TMC	CPI	OTH
Chennai	14	12	2	—N/a	—N/a
Chengalpattu	17	14	3	—N/a	—N/a
Vellore	12	10	2	—N/a	—N/a
Tiruvannamalai	9	8	1	—N/a	—N/a
Villupuram	12	11	1	—N/a	—N/a
Cuddalore	9	7	2	—N/a	—N/a
Dharmapuri	10	7	—N/a	1	2
Salem	17	12	2	—N/a	3
Coimbatore	17	14	2	1	—N/a
Erode	8	6	1	1	—N/a
Nilgiris	3	3	—N/a	—N/a	—N/a
Dindigul	7	5	2	—N/a	—N/a
Karur	4	4	—N/a	—N/a	—N/a
Tiruchirapalli	9	9	—N/a	—N/a	—N/a
Perambalur	5	3	1	—N/a	1
Thanjavur	14	9	3	2	—N/a
Nagapattinam	6	5	1	—N/a	—N/a
Pudukottai	5	2	1	—N/a	2
Sivaganga	6	3	2	1	—N/a
Ramanathapuram	4	3	1	—N/a	—N/a
Virudhunagar	6	4	1	—N/a	1
Madurai	15	10	4	—N/a	1
Thoothukudi	7	4	1	1	1
Tirunelveli	11	5	4	1	1
Kanyakumari	7	3	2	—N/a	2
Total	234	173	39	8	14 (Note: OTH (Others) consists of the remaining seats won by candidates from the following parties.: Bharatiya Janata Party–1; Janata Party–1; Independent (IND)–1; Pattali Makkal Katchi–4; All India Anna Dravida Munnetra Kazhagam–4; Janata Dal–1; All India Forward Bloc–1; Communist Party of India (Marxist)–1)

=== Results by District (Alliance Wise) ===
District	Seats					
District	Seats	DMK+	ADK+	MDMK	PMK	OTH
Chennai	14	14	—N/a	—N/a	—N/a	—N/a
Chengalpattu	17	17	—N/a	—N/a	—N/a	—N/a
Vellore	12	12	—N/a	—N/a	—N/a	—N/a
Tiruvannamalai	9	9	—N/a	—N/a	—N/a	—N/a
Villupuram	12	12	—N/a	—N/a	—N/a	—N/a
Cuddalore	9	9	—N/a	—N/a	—N/a	—N/a
Dharmapuri	10	8	—N/a	1	1	—N/a
Salem	17	14	1	—N/a	2	—N/a
Coimbatore	17	17	—N/a	—N/a	—N/a	—N/a
Erode	8	8	—N/a	—N/a	—N/a	—N/a
Nilgiris	3	3	—N/a	—N/a	—N/a	—N/a
Dindigul	7	7	—N/a	—N/a	—N/a	—N/a
Karur	4	4	—N/a	—N/a	—N/a	—N/a
Tiruchirapalli	9	9	—N/a	—N/a	—N/a	—N/a
Perambalur	5	4	—N/a	—N/a	1	—N/a
Thanjavur	14	14	—N/a	—N/a	—N/a	—N/a
Nagapattinam	6	6	—N/a	—N/a	—N/a	—N/a
Pudukottai	5	3	1	—N/a	—N/a	1
Sivaganga	6	6	—N/a	—N/a	—N/a	—N/a
Ramanathapuram	4	4	—N/a	—N/a	—N/a	—N/a
Virudhunagar	6	5	1	—N/a	—N/a	—N/a
Madurai	15	15	—N/a	—N/a	—N/a	—N/a
Thoothukudi	7	6	—N/a	—N/a	—N/a	1
Tirunelveli	11	10	1	—N/a	—N/a	—N/a
Kanyakumari	7	5	—N/a	1	—N/a	1
Total	234	221	4	2	4	3 (Note: OTH (Others) consists of the remaining 3 seats won by candidates from following parties.: Bharatiya Janata Party–1; Janata Party–1; Independent (IND)–1)

== Constituency wise results ==
Constituency		Winner				Runner Up				Margin	%
#	Name	Candidate	Party	Votes	%	Candidate	Party	Votes	%	Margin	%
1	Royapuram	R. Mathivanan	DMK	44,893	57.78	D. Jayakumar	ADMK	27,485	35.37	17,408	22.41
2	Harbour	K. Anbazhagan	DMK	39,263	70.57	Earnest Paul	INC	9,007	16.19	30,256	54.38
3	R. K. Nagar	S. P. Sarguna	DMK	75,125	62.12	R. M. D. Raveendran	ADMK	32,044	26.50	43,081	35.62
4	Park Town	T. Rajendar	DMK	44,565	68.43	S. V. Shankar	INC	15,086	23.17	29,479	45.26
5	Perambur (SC)	Chengai Sivam	DMK	90,683	67.29	V. Neelakandan	ADMK	32,332	23.99	58,351	43.30
6	Purasawalkam	B. Ranganathan	TMC(M)	98,157	70.61	J. Kathipara Gnanam	INC	25,543	18.37	72,614	52.24
7	Egmore (SC)	Parithi Ilamvazhuthi	DMK	51,061	72.57	N. Lakshmi	INC	13,876	19.72	37,185	52.85
8	Anna Nagar	Arcot N. Veeraswami	DMK	1,03,819	67.05	R. Balasubramanian	INC	34,802	22.48	69,017	44.57
9	T. Nagar	A. Chellakumar	TMC(M)	76,461	67.16	S. Vijayan	ADMK	27,463	24.12	48,998	43.04
10	Thousand Lights	M. K. Stalin	DMK	66,905	69.72	Zeenath Sheriffdeen	ADMK	22,028	22.95	44,877	46.77
11	Chepauk	M. Karunanidhi	DMK	46,097	77.05	N. S. S. Nellai Kannan	INC	10,313	17.24	35,784	59.81
12	Triplicane	Nanjil K. Manoharan	DMK	50,401	70.10	A. Wahab	ADMK	15,390	21.41	35,011	48.69
13	Mylapore	N. P. Ramajayam	DMK	79,736	67.25	T. K. Sampath	ADMK	27,932	23.56	51,804	43.69
14	Saidapet	K. Saidai Kittu	DMK	76,031	58.10	Saidai Duraisamy	ADMK	46,178	35.29	29,853	22.81
15	Gummidipundi	K. Venu	DMK	61,946	49.69	R. S. Munirathinam	ADMK	40,321	32.34	21,625	17.35
16	Ponneri (SC)	K. Sundaram	DMK	87,547	61.72	G. Gunasekaran	ADMK	42,156	29.72	45,391	32.00
17	Thiruvottiyur	T. C. Vijayan	DMK	1,15,939	64.19	B. Balraj	ADMK	40,917	22.65	75,022	41.54
18	Villivakkam	J. M. Aaroon Rashid	TMC(M)	1,94,471	70.24	M. G. Mohan	INC	46,724	16.88	1,47,747	53.36
19	Alandur	C. Shanmugam	DMK	1,17,545	66.23	K. Purushothaman	ADMK	41,551	23.41	75,994	42.82
20	Tambaram	M.A. Vaidyalingam	DMK	1,66,401	64.91	K.B. Madhavan	INC	52,442	20.46	1,13,959	44.45
21	Tirupporur (SC)	G. Chokkalingam	DMK	62,414	50.77	N.K. Loganathan	ADMK	30,518	24.82	31,896	25.95
22	Chengalpattu	V. Tamilmani	DMK	66,443	57.53	C.V.N. Kumarasamy	ADMK	29,638	25.66	36,805	31.87
23	Maduranthakam	S.K. Venkatesan	DMK	53,563	49.79	S.D. U. Kamchand	ADMK	42,970	39.94	10,593	9.85
24	Acharapakkam (SC)	S. Mathivanan	DMK	54,558	56.15	A. Bhuvaraghamoorthy	ADMK	29,187	30.04	25,371	26.11
25	Uthiramerur	K. Sundar	DMK	66,086	52.84	N.K. Gnanasekaran	ADMK	32,994	26.38	33,092	26.46
26	Kancheepuram	P. Murugesan	DMK	77,723	55.90	S.S. Thirunavukarasu	ADMK	45,094	32.43	32,629	23.47
27	Sriperumbudur (SC)	E. Kothandam	DMK	71,575	58.72	K.N. Chinnandi	INC	35,139	28.83	36,436	29.89
28	Poonamallee	D. Sudarsanam	TMC(M)	75,731	53.20	P. Krishnamoorthy	INC	25,220	17.72	50,511	35.48
29	Tiruvallur	C. Subramani	DMK	65,432	60.78	G. Kanagaraaj	ADMK	32,178	29.89	33,254	30.89
30	Tiruttani	E.A.P. Sivaji	DMK	58,049	53.90	G. Hari	ADMK	28,507	26.47	29,542	27.43
31	Pallipet	E. S. S. Raman	TMC(M)	79,848	67.03	B. Thangavel	INC	21,356	17.93	58,492	49.10
32	Arkonam (SC)	R. Thamizh Chelvan	DMK	70,550	58.13	R. Elumalai	PMK	23,730	19.55	46,820	38.58
33	Sholinghur	A.M. Munirathinam	TMC(M)	65,361	54.33	S. Shanmugham	PMK	31,431	26.13	33,930	28.20
34	Ranipet	R. Gandhi	DMK	71,346	50.80	M. Masilamani	ADMK	37,219	26.50	34,127	24.30
35	Arcot	P.N. Subramani	DMK	62,974	58.74	K.V. Ramadoss	ADMK	36,567	34.11	26,407	24.63
36	Katpadi	Duraimurugan	DMK	75,439	61.20	K. Pandurangan	ADMK	34,432	27.93	41,007	33.27
37	Gudiyatham	V.G. Dhanapal	DMK	48,837	48.62	S. Ramgopal	INC	19,701	19.61	29,136	29.01
38	Pernambut (SC)	V. Govindan	DMK	63,655	58.36	I. Tamizharasan	ADMK	32,481	29.78	31,174	28.58
39	Vaniayambadi	M. Abdul Latheef	DMK	74,223	67.36	K. Kuppusamy	INC	26,970	24.48	47,253	42.88
40	Natrampalli	R. Mahendran	DMK	50,118	39.65	T. Anbazhagan	IND	46,897	37.10	3,221	2.55
41	Tiruppattur	G. Shanmugam	DMK	66,207	53.44	P.G. Mani	ADMK	34,549	27.89	31,658	25.55
42	Chengam (SC)	K.V. Nannan	DMK	58,958	59.11	C.K. Thamizharasan	ADMK	32,325	32.41	26,633	26.70
43	Thandarambattu	K. Manivarma	TMC(M)	72,636	62.96	A.P. Kuppusamy	ADMK	32,822	28.45	39,814	34.51
44	Tiruvannamalai	K. Pitchandi	DMK	83,731	66.55	A. Arunachalam	INC	30,753	24.44	52,978	42.11
45	Kalasapakkam	P.S. Thiruvengadam	DMK	72,177	59.12	M. Sundarasami	INC	37,647	30.83	34,530	28.29
46	Polur	A. Rajendran	DMK	59,070	55.45	Agri. S. Krishnamoorthy	ADMK	34,917	32.78	24,153	22.67
47	Anaicut	C. Gopu	DMK	58,982	55.79	C.M. Suryakala	ADMK	27,366	25.89	31,616	29.90
48	Vellore	C. Gnanasekaran	TMC(M)	82,339	70.86	S.B. Bhaskaran	INC	21,451	18.46	60,888	52.40
49	Arni	R. Sivanandam	DMK	63,014	51.29	M. Chinnakulamdai	ADMK	44,835	36.49	18,179	14.80
50	Cheyyar	V. Anbalagan	DMK	71,416	61.24	P. Chandran	ADMK	33,930	29.09	37,486	32.15
51	Vandavasi (SC)	Bala Anandan	DMK	65,775	59.97	V. Gunaseelan	ADMK	26,029	23.73	39,746	36.24
52	Peranamallur	N. Pandurangan	DMK	57,907	52.17	C. Srinivasan	ADMK	30,114	27.13	27,793	25.04
53	Melmalayanur	A. Gnanasekar	DMK	50,905	45.68	Dharmarasan	INC	22,491	20.18	28,414	25.50
54	Gingee	T. Natarajan	DMK	51,327	42.60	T.N. Muruganandam	INC	25,893	21.49	25,434	21.11
55	Tindivanam	R. Sedunathan	DMK	45,448	45.40	M. Karunanithi	PMK	20,068	20.05	25,380	25.35
56	Vanur (SC)	A. Marimuthu	DMK	58,966	50.23	S.P. Erasendiran	ADMK	35,024	29.84	23,942	20.39
57	Kandamangalam (SC)	S. Alaguvelu	DMK	64,256	54.32	V. Subramaniyan	ADMK	34,261	28.96	29,995	25.36
58	Villupuram	K. Ponmudy	DMK	74,891	58.24	S.S. Panneerselvam	ADMK	33,305	25.90	41,586	32.34
59	Mugaiyur	A.G. Sampath	DMK	68,215	61.77	T.M. Arangarathan	ADMK	26,619	24.10	41,596	37.67
60	Thirunavalur	A.J. Manikkannan	DMK	43,983	41.28	K.G.P. Gnanamoorthy	ADMK	31,547	29.61	12,436	11.67
61	Ulundurpet (SC)	A. Mani	DMK	67,088	54.34	M. Anandan	ADMK	46,113	37.35	20,975	16.99
62	Nellikuppam	A. Mani	DMK	57,977	53.84	M.C. Dhamodaran	ADMK	32,594	30.27	25,383	23.57
63	Cuddalore	E. Pugazhendhi	DMK	74,480	62.27	K.V. Rajendiran	INC	25,853	21.62	48,627	40.65
64	Panruti	V. Ramaswamy	DMK	68,021	57.32	R. Rajendran	ADMK	28,891	24.35	39,130	32.97
65	Kurinjipadi	M.R.K. Panneerselvam	DMK	67,152	54.99	N. Pandarinathan	ADMK	28,139	23.04	39,013	31.95
66	Bhuvanagiri	A.V. Abdul Naser	DMK	49,457	43.80	P.D. Elangovan	PMK	30,112	26.67	19,345	17.13
67	Kattumannarkoil (SC)	E. Ramalingam	DMK	46,978	45.83	L. Elayaperumal	HRPI	37,159	36.25	9,819	9.58
68	Chidambaram	S. Azhagiri	TMC(M)	52,066	50.52	A. Radhakrishnan	INC	23,050	22.37	29,016	28.15
69	Vridhachalam	Kuzhandai Tamizharasan	DMK	49,103	37.42	R. Govindasamy	PMK	42,218	32.18	6,885	5.24
70	Mangalore (SC)	S. Puratchimani	TMC(M)	50,908	42.71	V.M.S. Saravanakumar	INC	31,620	26.53	19,288	16.18
71	Rishivandiam	S. Sivaraj	TMC(M)	65,230	61.34	P. Annadurai	ADMK	25,166	23.66	40,064	37.68
72	Chinnasalem	R. Mookkappan	DMK	66,981	59.83	P. Mohan	ADMK	35,336	31.56	31,645	28.27
73	Sankarapuram	T. Udhayasuriyan	DMK	62,673	53.68	A. Saruvar Kasim	ADMK	40,515	34.70	22,158	18.98
74	Hosur	B. Venkatasamy	JD	41,456	34.89	T. Venkatareddy	TMC(M)	39,719	33.43	1,737	1.46
75	Thalli	S. Raja Reddi	CPI	26,427	28.78	Venkatarama Reddi	INC	18,938	20.63	7,489	8.15
76	Kaveripattinam	P.V.S. Venkatesan	DMK	72,945	62.52	K.P. Munusamy	ADMK	37,086	31.78	35,859	30.74
77	Krishnagiri	Kanchana Kamalanathan	DMK	67,849	64.11	K.P. Kathavarayan	ADMK	32,238	30.46	35,611	33.65
78	Bargur	E.G. Sugavanam	DMK	59,148	50.71	J. Jayalalitha	ADMK	50,782	43.54	8,366	7.17
79	Harur (SC)	Vedammal	DMK	70,561	55.59	J. Natesan	INC	34,158	26.91	36,403	28.68
80	Morappur	V. Mullaiventhan	DMK	59,518	53.98	K. Singaram	ADMK	31,244	28.34	28,274	25.64
81	Palacode	G.L. Venkatachalam	DMK	56,917	49.74	C. Gopal	ADMK	34,844	30.45	22,073	19.29
82	Dharmapuri	K. Manokaran	DMK	63,973	55.28	Mase Harur	INC	26,951	23.29	37,022	31.99
83	Pennagaram	G.K. Mani	PMK	34,906	31.63	M. Arumugam	CPI	34,500	31.26	406	0.37
84	Mettur	P. Gopal	DMK	50,799	43.97	R. Balakrishnan	PMK	30,793	26.65	20,006	17.32
85	Taramangalam	P. Govindan	PMK	50,502	44.19	P. Elavarasan	DMK	25,795	22.57	24,707	21.62
86	Omalur	R.R. Sekaran	TMC(M)	41,523	40.62	C. Krishnan	ADMK	33,593	32.86	7,930	7.76
87	Yercaud (ST)	V. Perumal	DMK	38,964	45.15	R. Gunasekaran	ADMK	29,570	34.26	9,394	10.89
88	Salem-I	K.R.G. Dhanapalan	DMK	67,566	58.82	A.T. Natarajan	INC	37,299	32.47	30,267	26.35
89	Salem-II	A.L. Thangavel	DMK	63,588	54.93	S. Semmalai	ADMK	36,097	31.18	27,491	23.75
90	Veerapandi	S. Arumugam	DMK	75,563	54.34	K. Arjunan	ADMK	54,412	39.13	21,151	15.21
91	Panamarathupatty	S.R. Sivalingam	DMK	56,330	49.76	P. Vijayalakshmi Pa.	ADMK	43,159	38.12	13,171	11.64
92	Attur	A.M. Ramasamy	DMK	59,353	57.17	A.K. Murugesan	ADMK	37,057	35.69	22,296	21.48
93	Talavasal (SC)	K. Rani	TMC(M)	63,132	57.71	K. Kaliaperumal	INC	35,750	32.68	27,382	25.03
94	Rasipuram	P.R. Sundaram	ADMK	42,294	37.93	R.R. Damayandhi	DMK	41,840	37.52	454	0.41
95	Sendamangalam (ST)	C. Chandrasekaran	DMK	58,673	56.14	K. Kalavathi	ADMK	38,748	37.08	19,925	19.06
96	Namakkal (SC)	K. Veisamy	DMK	76,860	62.15	S. Anbaiagan	ADMK	38,795	31.37	38,065	30.78
97	Kapilamalai	K.K. Veerappan	DMK	64,605	56.00	R. Rajalingam	ADMK	34,895	30.25	29,710	25.75
98	Tiruchengode	T.P. Arumugam	DMK	96,456	58.10	S. Chinnusamy	ADMK	53,836	32.43	42,620	25.67
99	Sankari (SC)	V. Muthu	DMK	64,216	54.43	K.K. Ramasamy	ADMK	42,880	36.35	21,336	18.08
100	Edapadi	I. Ganesan	PMK	49,465	37.68	P.A. Murugesan	DMK	40,273	30.68	9,192	7.00
101	Mettupalayam	B. Arunkumar	DMK	71,954	55.60	K. Doraiswamy	ADMK	41,202	31.84	30,752	23.76
102	Avanashi (SC)	G. Elango	DMK	66,006	56.53	M. Thiagarajan	ADMK	39,549	33.87	26,457	22.66
103	Thondamuthur	C.R. Ramachandran	DMK	1,13,025	60.23	T. Malaravan	ADMK	50,888	27.12	62,137	33.11
104	Singanallur	N. Palaniswamy	DMK	92,379	60.15	R. Duraisamy	ADMK	33,967	22.12	58,412	38.03
105	Coimbatore West	C.T. Dhandapani	DMK	51,652	62.47	Raja Thangavel	INC	13,353	16.15	38,299	46.32
106	Coimbatore East	V.K. Lakshmanan	TMC(M)	61,860	68.81	R.S. Velan	INC	14,174	15.77	47,686	53.04
107	Perur	A. Natarasan	DMK	96,507	61.01	R. Thirumalaisamy	ADMK	38,934	24.61	57,573	36.40
108	Kinathukkadavu	M. Shanmugham	DMK	49,231	49.42	K.M. Mylswamy	ADMK	35,267	35.40	13,964	14.02
109	Pollachi	S. Raju	DMK	58,709	49.20	V. Jayaraman	ADMK	36,895	30.92	21,814	18.28
110	Valparai (SC)	V.P. Singaravelu	DMK	55,284	59.50	Kurichimanimaran	ADMK	30,012	32.30	25,272	27.20
111	Udumalpet	D. Selvaraj	DMK	69,286	52.53	C. Shanmugavel	ADMK	44,966	34.09	24,320	18.44
112	Dharapuram (SC)	R. Saraswathy	DMK	62,027	55.49	P. Easwaramurthi	ADMK	38,989	34.88	23,038	20.61
113	Vellakoil	M.P. Saminathan	DMK	57,467	49.37	Dhurai Ramaswamy	ADMK	50,553	43.43	6,914	5.94
114	Pongalur	P. Mohan	TMC(M)	51,827	53.25	Thalapathy Murugesan	INC	29,886	30.71	21,941	22.54
115	Palladam	S.S. Ponmudi	DMK	73,901	55.64	K.S. Duraimurugan	ADMK	41,361	31.14	32,540	24.50
116	Tiruppur	K. Subbarayan	CPI	1,01,392	50.56	C. Sivasamy	ADMK	60,337	30.09	41,055	20.47
117	Kangayam	N. S. Rajkumar	DMK	63,801	56.67	N. Ramasamy	ADMK	37,792	33.57	26,009	23.10
118	Modakurichi	S. Jagadeesan	DMK	64,436	54.97	R.N. Kittusamy	ADMK	24,896	21.24	39,540	33.73
119	Perundurai	N. Periyasamy	CPI	60,587	49.79	P. Periyasamy	ADMK	43,036	35.36	17,551	14.43
120	Erode	N.K.K. Periasamy	DMK	1,04,726	59.80	S. Muthusamy	ADMK	56,889	32.48	47,837	27.32
121	Bhavani	Balasubramanian	TMC(M)	57,256	51.23	K.S. Manivannan	ADMK	28,427	25.43	28,829	25.80
122	Andhiyur (SC)	P. Selvarasu	DMK	52,535	52.97	M. Subramaniam	ADMK	27,541	27.77	24,994	25.20
123	Gobichettipalayam	G.P. Venkidu	DMK	59,983	53.86	K.A. Sengottayan	ADMK	45,254	40.63	14,729	13.23
124	Bhavanisagar	V.A. Andamuthu	DMK	63,483	54.89	V.K. Chinnasamy	ADMK	40,032	34.62	23,451	20.27
125	Sathyamangalam	S.K. Rajendran	DMK	50,885	48.65	T.R. Attiannan	ADMK	42,101	40.25	8,784	8.40
126	Coonoor (SC)	N. Thangavel	DMK	63,919	64.27	S. Karuppusamy	ADMK	28,404	28.56	35,515	35.71
127	Ootacamund	T. Gundan	DMK	69,636	70.25	H.M. Raju	INC	22,456	22.65	47,180	47.60
128	Gudalur	B.M. Mubarak	DMK	73,565	59.43	K.R. Raju	ADMK	27,660	22.35	45,905	37.08
129	Palani (SC)	T. Poovendhan	DMK	68,246	57.87	P. Karuppuchamy	ADMK	31,586	26.79	36,660	31.08
130	Oddanchatram	R. Sakkarapani	DMK	66,379	58.57	K. Sellamuthu	ADMK	29,556	26.08	36,823	32.49
131	Periyakulam	L. Mookaiah	DMK	53,427	46.75	K.M. Kader Mohideen	ADMK	31,520	27.58	21,907	19.17
132	Theni	N.R. Alagaraja	TMC(M)	77,522	62.76	V.R. Nedunchezhiyan	ADMK	28,378	22.97	49,144	39.79
133	Bodinayakkanur	A. Sudalaimuthu	DMK	54,893	51.26	S.P. Jeyakumar	ADMK	28,806	26.90	26,087	24.36
134	Cumbum	O.R. Ramachandran	TMC(M)	58,628	54.66	R.T. Gopalan	IND	22,888	21.34	35,740	33.32
135	Andipatti	P. Aasiyan	DMK	50,736	44.90	A. Muthiah	ADMK	37,035	32.77	13,701	12.13
136	Sedapatti	G. Thalapathi	DMK	48,899	49.69	R. Muthiah	ADMK	38,698	39.33	10,201	10.36
137	Thirumangalam	M. Muthuramalingam	DMK	56,950	53.41	S. Andithevar	ADMK	28,025	26.28	28,925	27.13
138	Usilampatti	P.N. Vallarasu	AIFB	75,324	76.18	P. Veluchamy	ADMK	19,421	19.64	55,903	56.54
139	Nilakottai (SC)	A.S. Ponnammal	TMC(M)	59,541	54.48	A. Rasu	INC	27,538	25.20	32,003	29.28
140	Sholavandan	L. Santhanam	DMK	52,151	49.29	A.M. Paramasivan	ADMK	33,343	31.52	18,808	17.77
141	Tirupparankundram	C. Ramachandran	DMK	99,379	60.75	S.V. Shanmugam	ADMK	37,970	23.21	61,409	37.54
142	Madurai West	P.T.R. Palanivel Rajan	DMK	61,723	62.42	R. Muthusamy	INC	17,465	17.66	44,258	44.76
143	Madurai Central	A. Deivanayagam	TMC(M)	38,010	46.69	V.S. Chandraleka	JP	20,069	24.65	17,941	22.04
144	Madurai East	V. Velusamy	DMK	39,478	46.24	T.R. Janardhanan	ADMK	20,181	23.64	19,297	22.60
145	Samayanallur (SC)	S. Selvaraj	DMK	1,01,807	60.01	R. Raja Selvaraj	ADMK	46,159	27.21	55,648	32.80
146	Melur	K.V.V. Rajamanickam	TMC(M)	73,999	62.21	C.R. Sundararajan	INC	29,258	24.60	44,741	37.61
147	Natham	M. Andi Ambalam	TMC(M)	62,527	57.33	S. Asai Alangaram	INC	26,891	24.66	35,636	32.67
148	Dindigul	R. Manimaran	DMK	94,353	65.53	V. Marutharaj	ADMK	29,229	20.30	65,124	45.23
149	Athoor	I. Periasamy	DMK	82,294	64.09	C. Chinnamuthu	ADMK	32,002	24.92	50,292	39.17
150	Vedasandur	S.V. Krishnan	DMK	60,639	43.98	S. Gandhirajan	ADMK	39,870	28.92	20,769	15.06
151	Aravakurichi	S. S. Md. Ismail	DMK	41,153	38.36	V.K. Duraisamy	ADMK	32,059	29.89	9,094	8.47
152	Karur	Vasuki Murugesan	DMK	79,302	53.87	M. Chinnasamy	ADMK	47,294	32.13	32,008	21.74
153	Krishnarayapuram (SC)	S. Nagarathinam	DMK	57,638	50.35	A. Arivalagan	ADMK	42,461	37.09	15,177	13.26
154	Marungapuri	B.M. Senguttuvan	DMK	56,380	46.86	K. Solairaj	ADMK	49,986	41.54	6,394	5.32
155	Kulithalai	R. Selvam	DMK	60,521	49.19	A. Pappasundaram	ADMK	42,771	34.76	17,750	14.43
156	Thottiam	K. Kannaiyan	DMK	74,903	65.22	N. Nedumaran	ADMK	33,921	29.54	40,982	35.68
157	Uppiliapuram (ST)	T. Karuppusami	DMK	70,372	62.20	R. Saroja	ADMK	35,804	31.65	34,568	30.55
158	Musiri	M.N. Jothi Kannan	DMK	67,319	51.04	C. Mallika Chinnasamy	ADMK	39,551	29.99	27,768	21.05
159	Lalgudi	K.N. Nehru	DMK	84,113	68.47	J. Logambal	INC	24,609	20.03	59,504	48.44
160	Perambalur (SC)	M. Devarajan	DMK	64,918	55.07	S. Murugesan	ADMK	41,517	35.22	23,401	19.85
161	Varahur (SC)	Duraisamy	DMK	56,076	51.97	A. Palanimuthu	ADMK	34,925	32.37	21,151	19.60
162	Ariyalur	D. Amaramoorthy	TMC(M)	62,157	53.19	A. Elavarasan	ADMK	37,263	31.89	24,894	21.30
163	Andimadam	Rajendiran	PMK	49,853	47.48	Sivasubramaniyan	DMK	36,451	34.72	13,402	12.76
164	Jayankondam	K.C. Ganesan	DMK	52,421	42.93	Kaduvetti Guru	PMK	39,931	32.70	12,490	10.23
165	Srirangam	T.P. Mayavan	DMK	73,371	55.74	M. Paranjothi	ADMK	43,512	33.06	29,859	22.68
166	Tiruchirapalli-I	B. Baranikumar	DMK	48,045	63.47	Pa. Krishnan	ADMK	20,535	27.13	27,510	36.34
167	Tiruchirapalli-II	Anbil Poyyamozhi	DMK	71,058	68.24	P. Selvaraj	ADMK	26,229	25.19	44,829	43.05
168	Thiruverambur	K. Durai	DMK	78,692	62.60	T. Rathinavel	ADMK	31,939	25.41	46,753	37.19
169	Sirkali (SC)	M. Panneerselvam	DMK	63,975	59.25	V. Bharathi	ADMK	34,281	31.75	29,694	27.50
170	Poompuhar	G. Mohanadasan	DMK	51,285	49.88	N. Vijayabalan	ADMK	32,872	31.97	18,413	17.91
171	Mayuram	M.M.S. Abul Hasan	TMC(M)	60,522	58.50	Rama Chidambaram	INC	25,918	25.05	34,604	33.45
172	Kuttalam	P. Kalayanam Kuttalam	DMK	60,940	54.14	M. Rajendran	ADMK	35,219	31.29	25,721	22.85
173	Nannilam (SC)	Padma	TMC(M)	66,773	61.37	K. Gopal	ADMK	30,800	28.31	35,973	33.06
174	Tiruvarur (SC)	A. Asohan	DMK	69,212	60.03	P. Arumuga Pandian	INC	24,845	21.55	44,367	38.48
175	Nagapattinam	G. Nizamudeen	DMK	46,533	43.68	R. Jeevanantham	ADMK	26,805	25.16	19,728	18.52
176	Vedaranyam	S.K. Vedarathinam	DMK	54,185	46.92	P. C. V. Balasubramaniam	INC	31,393	27.19	22,792	19.73
177	Tiruthuraipundi (SC)	G. Palanisami	CPI	79,103	63.39	K. Gopalsami	INC	25,415	20.37	53,688	43.02
178	Mannargudi	V. Sivapunniam	CPI	71,803	59.80	K. Kaliyaperumal	ADMK	31,969	26.62	39,834	33.18
179	Pattukkottai	P. Balasubramanian	DMK	69,880	59.51	Seeni Baskaran	ADMK	36,259	30.88	33,621	28.63
180	Peravurani	V. Thirugnanasambandam	TMC(M)	70,112	58.68	K. Sakthivel	INC	30,472	25.50	39,640	33.18
181	Orathanad	P. Rajamanickam	DMK	68,213	57.24	V. Suriyamoorthy	ADMK	37,864	31.77	30,349	25.47
182	Thiruvonam	N. Ramachandran	DMK	72,403	57.36	K. Thangamuthu	ADMK	40,853	32.37	31,550	24.99
183	Thanjavur	S.N.M. Ubayadullah	DMK	79,471	65.82	S.D. Somasundaram	ADMK	34,389	28.48	45,082	37.34
184	Tiruvaiyaru	D. Chandrasekaran	DMK	57,429	56.32	M. Subramanian	ADMK	30,418	29.83	27,011	26.49
185	Papanasam	N. Karuppanna Odayar	TMC(M)	58,757	56.60	R. Thirunavukkarasu	IND	20,415	19.67	38,342	36.93
186	Valangiman (SC)	Gomathi Srinivasan	DMK	48,019	50.78	V. Vivekanandan	ADMK	27,508	29.09	20,511	21.69
187	Kumbakonam	K.S. Mani	DMK	69,849	61.69	Erama Eramanatham	ADMK	34,539	30.51	35,310	31.18
188	Thiruvidaimarudur	S. Ramalingam	DMK	70,500	59.67	T.R. Loganathan	INC	28,559	24.17	41,941	35.50
189	Thirumayam	V. Chinnaiah	TMC(M)	53,552	47.35	S. Regupathy	ADMK	41,664	36.84	11,888	10.51
190	Kolathur (SC)	Selvaraj	DMK	72,706	54.88	A. Karuppayee	ADMK	48,550	36.65	24,156	18.23
191	Pudukkottai	A. Periannan	DMK	79,205	56.66	S.C. Swaminathan	INC	36,422	26.05	42,783	30.61
192	Alangudi	A. Venkatachalam	IND	35,345	25.58	S. Erasasekaran	CPI	34,693	25.11	652	0.47
193	Arantangi	S. Thirunavukkarasu	ADMK	70,260	50.10	S. Shanmugam	DMK	56,028	39.95	14,232	10.15
194	Tiruppattur	R. Sivaraman	DMK	58,925	56.76	S. Kannappan	ADMK	39,648	38.19	19,277	18.57
195	Karaikudi	N. Sundaram	TMC(M)	76,888	62.98	M. Raju	ADMK	26,504	21.71	50,384	41.27
196	Tiruvadanai	Kr. Ramasamy	TMC(M)	68,837	61.77	D. Sakthivel	INC	17,437	15.65	51,400	46.12
197	Ilayangudi	M. Tamilkudimagan	DMK	43,080	49.37	V.D. Nadarajan	ADMK	28,276	32.40	14,804	16.97
198	Sivaganga	Tha. Kiruttinan	DMK	64,438	60.65	K.R. Muruganandam	ADMK	31,437	29.59	33,001	31.06
199	Manamadurai (SC)	K. Thangamani	CPI	49,639	49.82	M. Gunasekaran	ADMK	31,869	31.99	17,770	17.83
200	Paramakudi (SC)	U. Thisaiveeran	DMK	44,472	43.18	K. Muniasamy	IND	25,571	24.83	18,901	18.35
201	Ramanathapuram	A. Rahmankhan	DMK	59,794	51.22	S.K.G. Sekar	ADMK	23,903	20.47	35,891	30.75
202	Kadaladi	S.P. Thangavelan	DMK	56,031	53.23	V. Sathiyamoorthy	ADMK	36,061	34.26	19,970	18.97
203	Mudukulathur	S. Balakrishnan	TMC(M)	41,850	44.71	V. Bose	IND	19,322	20.64	22,528	24.07
204	Aruppukottai	V. Thangapandian	DMK	45,081	43.70	K. Sundarapandian	ADMK	28,716	27.84	16,365	15.86
205	Sattur	K.M. Vijayakumar	DMK	58,972	43.20	S. Ramachandran	ADMK	49,608	36.34	9,364	6.86
206	Virudhunagar	A.R.R. Seenivasan	DMK	47,247	41.53	G. Karikolraj	INC	23,760	20.88	23,487	20.65
207	Sivakasi	R. Chokkar	TMC(M)	61,322	40.14	N. Alagarsamy	ADMK	42,590	27.88	18,732	12.26
208	Srivilliputhur	R. Thamaraikkani	ADMK	49,436	38.50	T. Ramasamy	CPI	40,769	31.75	8,667	6.75
209	Rajapalayam (SC)	V.P. Rajan	DMK	49,984	38.62	P. Prabakar	ADMK	31,045	23.99	18,939	14.63
210	Vilathikulam	K. Ravisankar	DMK	30,190	32.10	Vai. Gopalsamy	MDMK	29,556	31.43	634	0.67
211	Ottapidaram (SC)	K. Krishnasamy	JP	24,585	27.32	S. Paulraj	ADMK	23,437	26.05	1,148	1.27
212	Koilpatti	L. Ayyalusamy	CPI	39,315	35.19	K.S. Radhakrishnan	MDMK	31,828	28.49	7,487	6.70
213	Sankarankoil (SC)	C. Karuppasamy	ADMK	37,933	33.94	S. Rasiah @ Raja	DMK	37,333	33.41	600	0.53
214	Vasudevanallur (SC)	R. Eswaran	TMC(M)	32,693	32.50	P. Suresh Babu	INC	32,077	31.89	616	0.61
215	Kadayanallur	K. Naina Mohamed	DMK	49,641	46.58	A.M. Gani	ADMK	32,949	30.92	16,692	15.66
216	Tenkasi	K. Ravi Arunan	TMC(M)	60,758	52.82	Aladi Sankaraiya	INC	29,998	26.08	30,760	26.74
217	Alangulam	Aladi Aruna	DMK	53,374	46.10	M.S. Kamaraj	INC	29,038	25.08	24,336	21.02
218	Tirunelveli	A.L. Subramanian	DMK	59,914	52.48	Karuppasamy	ADMK	36,590	32.05	23,324	20.43
219	Palayamcottai	Md. Kodar Maideen	DMK	71,303	62.98	P. Dharmalingam	ADMK	26,939	23.80	44,364	39.18
220	Cheranmahadevi	P. Veldurai	TMC(M)	39,004	39.41	P.H. Pandian	IND	26,897	27.18	12,107	12.23
221	Ambasamudram	R. Avudaiappan	DMK	46,116	48.89	R. Murugaiah Pandian	ADMK	26,427	28.02	19,689	20.87
222	Nanguneri	S.V. Krishnan	CPI	37,342	40.27	A.S.A. Karunakaran	ADMK	34,193	36.87	3,149	3.40
223	Radhapuram	M. Appavu	TMC(M)	45,808	46.60	S.K. Chandrasekaran	INC	16,862	17.15	28,946	29.45
224	Sattangulam	S. S. Mani Nadar	TMC(M)	44,376	54.51	B. Kasianantham	INC	19,140	23.51	25,236	31.00
225	Tiruchendur	S. Jennifer Chandran	DMK	59,206	59.22	T. Thamotharan	ADMK	28,175	28.18	31,031	31.04
226	Srivaikuntam	S. David Selwyn	DMK	36,917	42.57	S. Danielraj	INC	23,708	27.34	13,209	15.23
227	Tuticorin	N. Periasamy	DMK	56,511	38.16	Roche Victoria	IND	35,140	23.73	21,371	14.43
228	Kanniyakumari	N. Suresh Rajan	DMK	42,755	43.63	S. Thanu Pillai	ADMK	20,892	21.32	21,863	22.31
229	Nagercoil	M. Moses	TMC(M)	51,086	48.40	S. Velpandian	BJP	22,608	21.42	28,478	26.98
230	Colachel	Era Bernard	DMK	41,217	42.85	S.P. Kutty	BJP	33,791	35.13	7,426	7.72
231	Padmanabhapuram	C. Velayuthan	BJP	27,443	31.76	Bala Janathipathy	DMK	22,903	26.51	4,540	5.25
232	Thiruvattar	V. Alban	DMK	37,523	41.23	J. Hema Chandran	CPI(M)	25,169	27.66	12,354	13.57
233	Vilavancode	D. Mony	CPI(M)	42,867	43.35	V. Thankaraj	DMK	21,585	21.83	21,282	21.52
234	Killiyoor	Kumaradas	TMC(M)	33,227	41.24	C. Santhakumar	BJP	22,810	28.31	10,417	12.93

== Impact and Aftermath ==
AIADMK suffered a rout in the elections. Most of sitting ministers of the AIADMK government, including the chief minister Jayalalithaa lost their seats. Jayalalithaa lost to DMK's E. G. Sugavanam by a margin of 8,366 votes in the Bargur constituency. A year after the election, the AIADMK split, when a faction led by the Arantangi MLA Su. Thirunavukkarasar broke away from the party. The MDMK which was contesting its first statewide elections since its formation in 1994 drew a blank. MDMK leader Vaiko was defeated in both the Vilathikulam Assembly constituency and the Sivakasi parliamentary constituency. This election also saw the PMK electing four members to the assembly. The massive victory of the DMK-TMC-CPI combine in the assembly elections spilled over to the parliamentary elections. The coalition was able to win all 39 parliamentary seats in Tamil Nadu and the lone parliamentary seat in the nearby Pondicherry. This tally of 40 seats enabled the DMK-TMC combine to be part of the United Front government during 1996–98.

In June 1996, AIADMK General Secretary J. Jayalalithaa stated that her close aide V. K. Sasikala was not responsible for the party’s electoral defeat, alleging that some party members were attempting to use her as a scapegoat to conceal their own failures. She maintained that Sasikala and her family had no role in party affairs or elections. Jayalalithaa further claimed that internal sabotage by party members denied tickets to contest, along with dissatisfaction among others, contributed to the defeat. Referring to her loss in Bargur, she attributed it to false propaganda and electoral malpractices. She denied corruption allegations against her, asserting her innocence and stating that she was prepared to face legal proceedings and prove the charges to be fabricated.

== Cabinet ==
S.no	Name	Designation	Party
Chief Minister
1.	M. Karunanidhi	Chief Minister	DMK
Cabinet Ministers
2.	K. Anbazhagan	Minister for Education	DMK
3.	Arcot N. Veerasamy	Minister for Health and Electricity	DMK
4.	Nanjil K. Manoharan	Minister for Revenue	DMK
5.	Ko. Si. Mani	Minister for Rural Development and Local Administration	DMK
6.	Veerapandi S. Arurmugam	Minister for Agriculture	DMK
7.	Duraimurugan	Minister for Public Works	DMK
8.	K. Ponmudy	Minister for Transport	DMK
9.	Dr M.Tamizhkudimagan	Minister for Tamil Language & Culture	DMK
10.	K.N. Nehru	Minister for Food, PDS and Co-operation	DMK
11.	K. Sundaram	Minister for Milk	DMK
12.	A. Rahman Khan	Minister for Labour	DMK
13.	Aladi Aruna	Minister for Law	DMK
14.	V. Thangapandian	Minister for Co-operation	DMK
15.	N.K.K.Periyasamy	Minister for Handlooms	DMK
16	M.R.K. Panneerselvam	Minister for Backward Classes	DMK
17.	Pongalur N. Palanisamy	Minister for Animal Husbandry	DMK
18.	K. Pitchandi	Minister for Housing	DMK
19.	I. Periyasamy	Minister for Rural Industries and Registration	DMK
20.	V.Mullaivendan	Minister for Information	DMK
21.	Pulavar Senguttuvan	Minister for Hindu Religious & Charitable Endowments	DMK
22.	S.P. Sarkuna Pandian	Minister for Social Welfare	DMK
23.	Samayanallur S. Selvarasu	Minister for Adi Dravidar and Tribal Welfare	DMK
24.	N. Suresh Rajan	Minister for Tourism	DMK
25.	Andhiyur P. Selvarasu	Minister for Khadi & Printing	DMK
26.	S. Jennifer Chandran	Minister for Fisheries	DMK

| After the death of the minister Thiru V.Thangapandian there is a Inclusion of Thiru Pasumpon Tha Kirittinan as Minister for Highways and seniority changes done he is placed in No 9 in ministers list and the cabinet re-designated several changes shuffling done.

== Bypolls (1996–2001) ==
Date	Constituency	MLA before election	Party before election	Elected MLA	Party after election
8 February 1997	Pudukkottai	A. Periannan	Dravida Munnetra Kazhagam	P. Mari Ayya	Dravida Munnetra Kazhagam
22 February 1998	Aruppukkottai	V. Thangapandian	Dravida Munnetra Kazhagam	Thangam Thennarasu	Dravida Munnetra Kazhagam
22 February 1998	Coonoor	N. Thangavel	Dravida Munnetra Kazhagam	M. Renganathan	Dravida Munnetra Kazhagam
5 September 1999	Thiruvattar	V. Alban	Dravida Munnetra Kazhagam	S. Philomin Dhas	Tamil Maanila Congress
11 September 1999	Natham	M. Andi Ambalam	Tamil Maanila Congress	Natham R. Vishwanthan	All India Anna Dravida Munnetra Kazhagam
17 February 2000	Tiruchirappalli-II	Anbil Poyyamozhi	Dravida Munnetra Kazhagam	Anbil Periyasamy	Dravida Munnetra Kazhagam
17 February 2000	Nellikuppam	A. Mani	Dravida Munnetra Kazhagam	V. C. Shanmugham	Dravida Munnetra Kazhagam

== See also ==
- Elections in Tamil Nadu
- Legislature of Tamil Nadu
- Government of Tamil Nadu
