= Ilaiyangudi Assembly constituency =

Not existing

Coordinates: 9.63°N 78.63°E

Ilaiyangudi
- Former constituency for the Tamil Nadu Legislative Assembly

Constituency details
- Country: India
- Region: South India
- State: Tamil Nadu
- District: Sivaganga
- Lok Sabha constituency: Sivaganga
- Established: 1967
- Abolished: 2008
- Total electors: 1,45,800 (2006)
- Reservation: None

Ilaiyangudi is a state assembly constituency in Sivaganga district in Tamil Nadu.

In 2008, under a Delimitation of Parliamentary and Assembly Constituency Order, the Ilaiyangudi assembly constituency was merged with Manamadurai.

== Members of the Legislative Assembly ==
Year	Winner	Party
1967	V. Malaikannan	Dravida Munnetra Kazhagam
1971	V. Malaikannan	Dravida Munnetra Kazhagam
1977	S. Sivasamy	Communist Party of India
1980	S. Sivasamy	Communist Party of India
1984	Anbalangan, P	All India Anna Dravida Munnetra Kazhagam
1989	M. Sathiah	Dravida Munnetra Kazhagam
1991	M. S. M. Ramachandran	All India Anna Dravida Munnetra Kazhagam
1996	M. Tamilkudimagan	Dravida Munnetra Kazhagam
2001	V. D. Natarajan	All India Anna Dravida Munnetra Kazhagam
2006	R. S. Rajakannappan	Dravida Munnetra Kazhagam
2009	Suba. Mathiarasan	Dravida Munnetra Kazhagam

== Election results ==
=== 2009 Bypoll ===
Nine contestants were in fray in Ilayankudi constituency. They included three from major political parties, Suba. Mathiarasan of DMK, Azhagu. Balakrishnan of DMDK and P. M. Rajendran of BJP.

Tamil Nadu assembly by-election, 2009: Ilayankudi
Party	Candidate	Votes	%	±%
DMK	Suba. Mathiarasan	61,084	71.97%	
DMDK	Azhagu. Balakrishnan	19,628	23.13%	
Majority		41,456		
Turnout		84,875		
DMK hold		Swing		

=== 2006 ===
2006 Tamil Nadu Legislative Assembly election: Ilaiyangudi
Party	Candidate	Votes	%	±%
DMK	Raja Kannappan	50,952	52.28%	
AIADMK	K. Ayyachamy	38,246	39.24%	−8.62%
DMDK	V. Manimaran	2,705	2.78%	
BJP	M. Deivendran	1,344	1.38%	
Independent	R. Murugesan	1,229	1.26%	
AIFB	M. Saravanan	1,123	1.15%	
BSP	S. Sethubathi Durai	614	0.63%	
Independent	S. Ayyasamy	434	0.45%	
JD(U)	S. S. Balakrishnan	348	0.36%	
Independent	R. Baskaran	272	0.28%	
Independent	S. A. Krishnan	198	0.20%	
Margin of victory		12,706	13.04%	8.09%
Turnout		97,465	66.85%	4.73%
Registered electors		145,800		
DMK gain from AIADMK		Swing	4.42%	

=== 2001 ===
2001 Tamil Nadu Legislative Assembly election: Ilaiyangudi
Party	Candidate	Votes	%	±%
AIADMK	V. D. Nadarajan	45,342	47.86%	15.45%
MTD	Raja Kannappan	40,660	42.92%	
MDMK	V. Malaikannan	4,080	4.31%	−8.06%
Independent	A. Joseph Vincent Amalraj	2,379	2.51%	
Independent	M. Maliraju	844	0.89%	
Independent	P. M. K. Rasool Khan	843	0.89%	
Independent	A. Jesu	595	0.63%	
Margin of victory		4,682	4.94%	−12.02%
Turnout		94,743	62.12%	−0.33%
Registered electors		152,529		
AIADMK gain from DMK		Swing	-1.51%	

=== 1996 ===
1996 Tamil Nadu Legislative Assembly election: Ilaiyangudi
Party	Candidate	Votes	%	±%
DMK	M. Tamilkudimagan	43,080	49.37%	15.64%
AIADMK	V. D. Nadarajan	28,276	32.40%	−29.52%
MDMK	V. Malaikannan	10,790	12.37%	
Independent	M. Gnanathiraviam	2,182	2.50%	
PMK	A. Ramu	1,438	1.65%	
Independent	J. Arockiasamy	539	0.62%	
Independent	V. Alagar	232	0.27%	
Independent	P. Ananthan	228	0.26%	
Independent	A. Mani	199	0.23%	
Independent	A. N. A. Abdul Sukkur	140	0.16%	
Independent	N. Alagar	113	0.13%	
Margin of victory		14,804	16.97%	−11.23%
Turnout		87,260	62.45%	−0.14%
Registered electors		147,929		
DMK gain from AIADMK		Swing	-12.55%	

=== 1991 ===
1991 Tamil Nadu Legislative Assembly election: Ilaiyangudi
Party	Candidate	Votes	%	±%
AIADMK	Ma. Sa. Ma. Ramachandran	52,994	61.92%	38.52%
DMK	N. Nallasethupathi	28,864	33.73%	−12.23%
IUML	N. H. Mohamed Cassim	2,784	3.25%	
Independent	S. Jeyarani	346	0.40%	
Independent	M. Selvam	325	0.38%	
Independent	A. Mani	269	0.31%	
Margin of victory		24,130	28.20%	7.12%
Turnout		85,582	62.58%	−8.46%
Registered electors		143,630		
AIADMK gain from DMK		Swing	15.96%	

=== 1989 ===
1989 Tamil Nadu Legislative Assembly election: Ilaiyangudi
Party	Candidate	Votes	%	±%
DMK	M. Sathiah	41,914	45.96%	2.31%
INC	S. Palanichamy	22,692	24.88%	
AIADMK	M. K. Khaja Najumudeen	21,344	23.40%	−25.24%
Independent	N. Rajendiran	2,724	2.99%	
Independent	K. Malaikhannan	1,679	1.84%	
Independent	S. Siva Kumar	448	0.49%	
Independent	P. Aruldoss	252	0.28%	
Independent	A. Mani	146	0.16%	
Margin of victory		19,222	21.08%	16.09%
Turnout		91,199	71.04%	−5.25%
Registered electors		130,395		
DMK gain from AIADMK		Swing	-2.68%	

=== 1984 ===
1984 Tamil Nadu Legislative Assembly election: Ilaiyangudi
Party	Candidate	Votes	%	±%
AIADMK	P. Anbalangan	40,974	48.64%	
DMK	V. Malaikannan	36,771	43.65%	−2.78%
Independent	A. Rethinam	5,065	6.01%	
Independent	A. Vedamanickam	694	0.82%	
Independent	Panai A. Mani	427	0.51%	
Independent	N. N. K. Seenippulavar	303	0.36%	
Margin of victory		4,203	4.99%	4.91%
Turnout		84,234	76.30%	8.05%
Registered electors		116,902		
AIADMK gain from CPI		Swing	2.14%	

=== 1980 ===
1980 Tamil Nadu Legislative Assembly election: Ilaiyangudi
Party	Candidate	Votes	%	±%
CPI	S. Sivasamy	34,437	46.51%	
DMK	V. Malaikkannan	34,381	46.43%	23.29%
Independent	M. P. Kalimuthan	3,343	4.51%	
Independent	R. Subramanian	1,342	1.81%	
Independent	N. N. K. Seenippulavar	545	0.74%	
Margin of victory		56	0.08%	−1.01%
Turnout		74,048	68.24%	−2.05%
Registered electors		109,607		
CPI hold		Swing	22.29%	

=== 1977 ===
1977 Tamil Nadu Legislative Assembly election: Ilaiyangudi
Party	Candidate	Votes	%	±%
CPI	R. Sivasamy	17,677	24.22%	
DMK	V. Malaikkannan	16,887	23.14%	
Independent	Muhammed Sheriff	15,362	21.05%	
Independent	S. Mathavan	15,055	20.63%	
JP	R. Sankar	5,303	7.27%	
Independent	R. Thangiah	1,707	2.34%	
Independent	N. N. Seeni Pulavar	877	1.20%	
Independent	S. N. K. J. Naina Mohamed	115	0.16%	
Margin of victory		790	1.08%	
Turnout		72,983	70.29%	−57.58%
Registered electors		105,262		
CPI gain from DMK		Swing		

=== 1971 ===
1971 Tamil Nadu Legislative Assembly election: Ilaiyangudi
Party	Candidate	Votes	%	±%
DMK	V. Malaikannan	45,551	61.99%	4.55%
INC	S. Ramakrishna Thevar	24,138	32.85%	−9.71%
Independent	S. Viaguiam Udayar	2,397	3.26%	
Independent	N. M. Nagainam Aboobacker	771	1.05%	
Independent	Candidate Name Not Given	625	0.85%	
Margin of victory		21,413	29.14%	14.26%
Turnout		73,482	127.87%	48.54%
Registered electors		58,857		
DMK hold		Swing	4.55%	

=== 1967 ===
1967 Madras Legislative Assembly election: Ilaiyangudi
Party	Candidate	Votes	%	±%
DMK	V. Malaikannan	40,461	57.44%	
INC	S. Ramachandran	29,978	42.56%	
Margin of victory		10,483	14.88%	
Turnout		70,439	79.32%	
Registered electors		90,804		
DMK win (new seat)				
