= T. P. Alagamuthu =

Indian politician

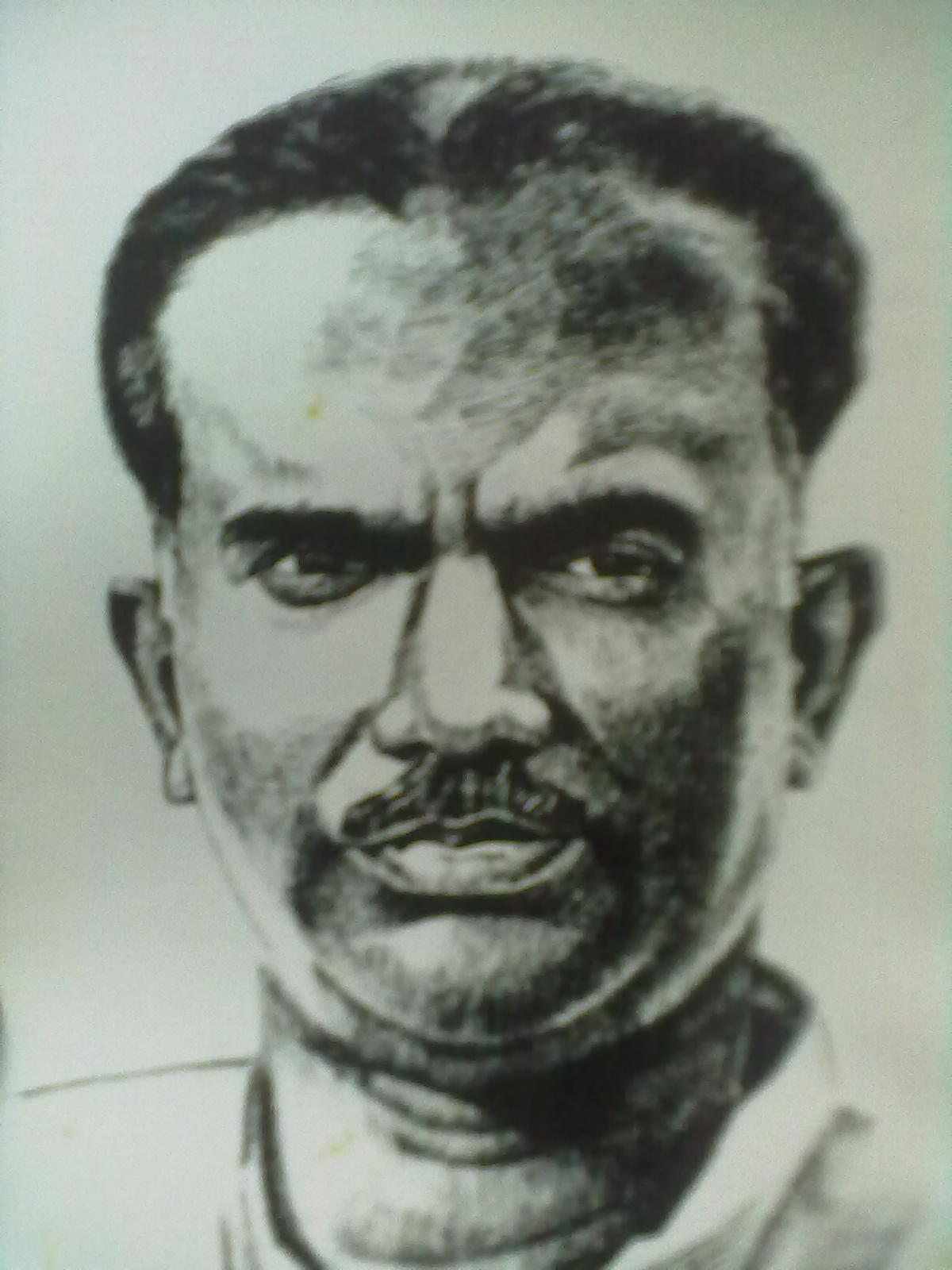

T. P. Alagamuthu was an Indian politician and former Member of the Legislative Assembly of Tamil Nadu. He was elected to the Tamil Nadu legislative assembly as a Dravida Munnetra Kazhagam candidate from Perambalur constituency in 1962 election and from Uppiliyapuram constituency in 1967 and 1971 elections.
