= Uppiliapuram Assembly constituency =

Former constituency in Tamil Nadu, India

Coordinates: 11.27°N 78.52°E

Uppilyapuram
- Former constituency for the Tamil Nadu Legislative Assembly

Constituency details
- Country: India
- Region: South India
- State: Tamil Nadu
- District: Trichy
- Lok Sabha constituency: Perambalur
- Established: 1962
- Abolished: 2008
- Total electors: 173,935
- Reservation: ST

Uppiliyapuram is a state assembly constituency in Tiruchirappalli district in Tamil Nadu. It is a Scheduled Tribe reserved constituency.

== Members of the Legislative Assembly ==
Year	Winner	Party
Madras State
1962	V. A. Mutthiah	Indian National Congress
1967	T. P. Alagamuthu	Dravida Munnetra Kazhagam
Tamil Nadu
1971	T. P. Alagamuthu	Dravida Munnetra Kazhagam
1977	R. Periasamy	Indian National Congress
1980	V. Rangarajan	All India Anna Dravida Munnetra Kazhagam
1984	R. Saroja	All India Anna Dravida Munnetra Kazhagam
1989	R. Mookkan	Anna Dravida Munnetra Kazhagam (Jayalalitha)
1991	V. Ravichandran	All India Anna Dravida Munnetra Kazhagam
1996	T. Karuppusami	Dravida Munnetra Kazhagam
2001	R. Saroja	All India Anna Dravida Munnetra Kazhagam
2006	R. Rani	Dravida Munnetra Kazhagam

== Election results ==
Vote share of winning candidates
2006	46.98%
2001	50.47%
1996	62.20%
1991	67.46%
1989	39.93%
1984	60.61%
1980	49.46%
1977	37.08%
1971	51.60%
1967	56.29%
1962	47.26%

=== 2006 ===
2006 Tamil Nadu Legislative Assembly election: Uppiliapuram
Party	Candidate	Votes	%	±%
DMK	R. Rani	59,171	46.98%	7.10%
AIADMK	P. Muthusamy	46,789	37.15%	−13.33%
DMDK	Mookan	14,514	11.52%	
Independent	Rajendran	2,066	1.64%	
BJP	Sivakumar	1,548	1.23%	
Independent	P. Ravi	1,248	0.99%	
Independent	Chelladurai	621	0.49%	
Margin of victory		12,382	9.83%	−0.77%
Turnout		125,957	72.42%	10.32%
Registered electors		173,935		
DMK gain from AIADMK		Swing	-3.50%	

=== 2001 ===
2001 Tamil Nadu Legislative Assembly election: Uppiliapuram
Party	Candidate	Votes	%	±%
AIADMK	R. Saroja	58,810	50.47%	18.83%
DMK	R. Rani	46,459	39.87%	−22.32%
Independent	P. Ravi	5,745	4.93%	
MDMK	E. Pon Rajendran	5,503	4.72%	−0.71%
Margin of victory		12,351	10.60%	−19.95%
Turnout		116,517	62.10%	−6.78%
Registered electors		187,653		
AIADMK gain from DMK		Swing	-11.72%	

=== 1996 ===
1996 Tamil Nadu Legislative Assembly election: Uppiliapuram
Party	Candidate	Votes	%	±%
DMK	T. Karuppusami	70,372	62.20%	30.87%
AIADMK	R. Saroja	35,804	31.65%	−35.81%
MDMK	P. Rajendran	6,144	5.43%	
Independent	P. Periasamy	389	0.34%	
Independent	T. Selvarani	259	0.23%	
Independent	V. Ravichandran	174	0.15%	
Margin of victory		34,568	30.55%	−5.58%
Turnout		113,142	68.88%	4.37%
Registered electors		170,627		
DMK gain from AIADMK		Swing	-5.26%	

=== 1991 ===
1991 Tamil Nadu Legislative Assembly election: Uppiliapuram
Party	Candidate	Votes	%	±%
AIADMK	V. Ravichandaran	69,748	67.46%	27.53%
DMK	M. Sundravadanam	32,392	31.33%	−4.40%
THMM	M. Periyasamy	714	0.69%	
Independent	M. Sekar	542	0.52%	
Margin of victory		37,356	36.13%	31.93%
Turnout		103,396	64.51%	−10.03%
Registered electors		165,647		
AIADMK hold		Swing	27.53%	

=== 1989 ===
1989 Tamil Nadu Legislative Assembly election: Uppiliapuram
Party	Candidate	Votes	%	±%
AIADMK	R. Mookkan	43,384	39.93%	−20.68%
DMK	M. Varadarajan	38,824	35.73%	−2.31%
INC	M. Selvaraj	18,774	17.28%	
AIADMK	S. Sivaprakasan	5,900	5.43%	−55.18%
Independent	K. Perumal	1,041	0.96%	
Independent	P. Periasamy	728	0.67%	
Margin of victory		4,560	4.20%	−18.37%
Turnout		108,651	74.54%	−0.65%
Registered electors		149,200		
AIADMK hold		Swing	-20.68%	

=== 1984 ===
1984 Tamil Nadu Legislative Assembly election: Uppiliapuram
Party	Candidate	Votes	%	±%
AIADMK	R. Saroja	59,347	60.61%	11.14%
DMK	R. Mookkayee	37,249	38.04%	
Independent	P. Periyasamy	712	0.73%	
Independent	O. K. Perumal	612	0.63%	
Margin of victory		22,098	22.57%	19.98%
Turnout		97,920	75.19%	5.98%
Registered electors		134,178		
AIADMK hold		Swing	11.14%	

=== 1980 ===
1980 Tamil Nadu Legislative Assembly election: Uppiliapuram
Party	Candidate	Votes	%	±%
AIADMK	V. Rengarajan	43,263	49.46%	19.07%
INC	R. Palani Muthu	40,997	46.87%	9.79%
JP	K. Perumal	1,751	2.00%	
Independent	O. K. Perumal	1,121	1.28%	
Independent	A. Ramaraju	333	0.38%	
Margin of victory		2,266	2.59%	−4.10%
Turnout		87,465	69.21%	5.91%
Registered electors		128,076		
AIADMK gain from INC		Swing	12.38%	

=== 1977 ===
1977 Tamil Nadu Legislative Assembly election: Uppiliapuram
Party	Candidate	Votes	%	±%
INC	R. Periasamy	31,642	37.08%	−6.32%
AIADMK	M. Atchaya Gopal	25,936	30.40%	
DMK	R. Natarasan	23,524	27.57%	−24.03%
JP	C. Chinna Samy	4,222	4.95%	
Margin of victory		5,706	6.69%	−1.51%
Turnout		85,324	63.30%	−19.24%
Registered electors		136,600		
INC gain from DMK		Swing	-14.51%	

=== 1971 ===
1971 Tamil Nadu Legislative Assembly election: Uppiliapuram
Party	Candidate	Votes	%	±%
DMK	T. P. Alagamuthu	42,861	51.60%	−4.69%
INC	R. Periasami	36,054	43.40%	2.71%
Independent	S. R. Nararajan	4,150	5.00%	
Margin of victory		6,807	8.19%	−7.40%
Turnout		83,065	82.53%	−5.08%
Registered electors		104,712		
DMK hold		Swing	-4.69%	

=== 1967 ===
1967 Madras Legislative Assembly election: Uppiliapuram
Party	Candidate	Votes	%	±%
DMK	T. P. Alagamuthu	43,453	56.29%	9.60%
INC	A. V. Mudaliar	31,416	40.69%	−6.57%
Independent	P. Chinnasamy	2,330	3.02%	
Margin of victory		12,037	15.59%	15.02%
Turnout		77,199	87.62%	3.08%
Registered electors		91,046		
DMK gain from INC		Swing	9.02%	

=== 1962 ===
1962 Madras Legislative Assembly election: Uppiliapuram
Party	Candidate	Votes	%	±%
INC	V. A. Muthiah	29,435	47.26%	
DMK	N. Pethureddiar	29,077	46.69%	
Independent	O. P. Sivalingam	3,766	6.05%	
Margin of victory		358	0.57%	
Turnout		62,278	84.53%	
Registered electors		76,113		
INC win (new seat)				
