= Pernambut Assembly constituency =

Former constituency in Tamil Nadu, India

Coordinates: 12.94°N 78.71°E

Peranambattu
- Former constituency for the Tamil Nadu Legislative Assembly

Constituency details
- Country: India
- Region: South India
- State: Tamil Nadu
- District: Thiruvannamalai
- Established: 1971
- Abolished: 2008
- Total electors: 188,544
- Reservation: SC

Pernambut was a state assembly constituency in Tamil Nadu. It is a Scheduled Caste reserved constituency. Elections and winners in the constituency are listed below.

== Members of the Legislative Assembly ==
Year	Winner	Party
1971	N. Krishnan	Dravida Munnetra Kazhagam
1977	I. Tamilarasan	All India Anna Dravida Munnetra Kazhagam
1980	G. Moorthy	All India Anna Dravida Munnetra Kazhagam
1984	C. K. Thamizharasan	All India Anna Dravida Munnetra Kazhagam
1989	V. Govindan	Dravida Munnetra Kazhagam
1991	J. Parandaman	All India Anna Dravida Munnetra Kazhagam
1996	V. Govindan	Dravida Munnetra Kazhagam
2001	C. Kanagathara	All India Anna Dravida Munnetra Kazhagam
2006	A. Chinnasamy	Dravida Munnetra Kazhagam

== Election results ==
Vote share of winning candidates
1971	59.61%
1977	37.21%
1980	45.31%
1984	56.17%
1989	42.94%
1991	67.54%
1996	58.36%
2001	59.07%
2006	50.05%

=== 1971 ===
1971 Tamil Nadu Legislative Assembly election: Pernambut
Party	Candidate	Votes	%	±%
DMK	N. Krishnan	35,804	59.61%	
INC	P. Rajagopal	21,665	36.07%	
Independent	Anairaj	2,195	3.65%	
Independent	L. Balakrishnan	399	0.66%	
Margin of victory		14,139	23.54%	
Turnout		60,063	72.30%	
Registered electors		86,711		
DMK win (new seat)				

=== 1977 ===
1977 Tamil Nadu Legislative Assembly election: Pernambut
Party	Candidate	Votes	%	±%
AIADMK	I. Tamilarsan	24,536	37.21%	
JP	P. Rajagopal	20,873	31.66%	
DMK	V. Govindan	15,862	24.06%	−35.56%
INC	R. P. Ulaganambi	3,628	5.50%	−30.57%
Independent	K. Saman	1,040	1.58%	
Margin of victory		3,663	5.56%	−17.99%
Turnout		65,939	64.72%	−7.57%
Registered electors		103,535		
AIADMK gain from DMK		Swing	-22.40%	

=== 1980 ===
1980 Tamil Nadu Legislative Assembly election: Pernambut
Party	Candidate	Votes	%	±%
AIADMK	G. Moorthy	30,048	45.31%	8.10%
INC	C. Rajarathinam	24,713	37.26%	31.76%
JP	P. Rajagopal	8,982	13.54%	
Independent	K. Samannan	1,044	1.57%	
Independent	S. Munisamy	731	1.10%	
Independent	B. Perumal	517	0.78%	
Independent	A. Tamilarasan	288	0.43%	
Margin of victory		5,335	8.04%	2.49%
Turnout		66,323	59.58%	−5.14%
Registered electors		113,142		
AIADMK hold		Swing	8.10%	

=== 1984 ===
1984 Tamil Nadu Legislative Assembly election: Pernambut
Party	Candidate	Votes	%	±%
AIADMK	C. K. Thamizharasan	47,813	56.17%	10.86%
DMK	V. Govindan	36,420	42.78%	
Independent	A. Raghunathan	895	1.05%	
Margin of victory		11,393	13.38%	5.34%
Turnout		85,128	74.54%	14.96%
Registered electors		119,028		
AIADMK hold		Swing	10.86%	

=== 1989 ===
1989 Tamil Nadu Legislative Assembly election: Pernambut
Party	Candidate	Votes	%	±%
DMK	V. Govindan	42,264	42.94%	0.16%
AIADMK	I. Tamilarasan	30,818	31.31%	−24.86%
INC	C. Rajaratnam	17,106	17.38%	
AIADMK	C. Sagadevan	7,386	7.50%	−48.66%
Independent	P. Subramani	337	0.34%	
Independent	K. Samannan	296	0.30%	
Independent	Subramani	224	0.23%	
Margin of victory		11,446	11.63%	−1.75%
Turnout		98,431	72.02%	−2.52%
Registered electors		139,817		
DMK gain from AIADMK		Swing	-13.23%	

=== 1991 ===
1991 Tamil Nadu Legislative Assembly election: Pernambut
Party	Candidate	Votes	%	±%
AIADMK	J. Parandaman	67,398	67.54%	36.23%
DMK	V. Govindan	24,900	24.95%	−17.98%
BJP	A. C. Ventaktasamy	3,870	3.88%	
PMK	S. S. Pandian	2,566	2.57%	
JP	T. Thirumal	646	0.65%	
Independent	P. Subramani	260	0.26%	
Independent	M. Chinnakuppan	144	0.14%	
Margin of victory		42,498	42.59%	30.96%
Turnout		99,784	64.13%	−7.89%
Registered electors		161,962		
AIADMK gain from DMK		Swing	24.61%	

=== 1996 ===
1996 Tamil Nadu Legislative Assembly election: Pernambut
Party	Candidate	Votes	%	±%
DMK	V. Govindan	63,655	58.36%	33.41%
AIADMK	I. Tamizharasan	32,481	29.78%	−37.76%
AIIC(T)	D. Stalin	5,166	4.74%	
BJP	K. Muthukrishnan	3,004	2.75%	−1.12%
JD	R. S. J. Ashok Ilayaraja	2,544	2.33%	
Independent	H. Kandappan	860	0.79%	
Independent	N. Gajendran	357	0.33%	
Independent	Amudha	241	0.22%	
Independent	K. Raghavan	165	0.15%	
Independent	A. Rajendran	137	0.13%	
Independent	T. P. Saravanan	97	0.09%	
Margin of victory		31,174	28.58%	−14.01%
Turnout		109,071	68.19%	4.06%
Registered electors		169,817		
DMK gain from AIADMK		Swing	-9.18%	

=== 2001 ===
2001 Tamil Nadu Legislative Assembly election: Pernambut
Party	Candidate	Votes	%	±%
AIADMK	C. Kanagathara	65,366	59.07%	29.29%
BJP	S. Thondral Nayagan	36,511	32.99%	30.24%
Independent	Dr. H. Kandappan	2,615	2.36%	
Independent	G. Sureshkumar	1,759	1.59%	
BSP	L. Gangadharan	1,560	1.41%	
JD(S)	R. Kamalavalli	1,232	1.11%	
Independent	K. Raghavan	1,017	0.92%	
LJSP	C. Dhansing	598	0.54%	
Margin of victory		28,855	26.08%	−2.51%
Turnout		110,658	60.92%	−7.27%
Registered electors		181,724		
AIADMK gain from DMK		Swing	0.71%	

=== 2006 ===
2006 Tamil Nadu Legislative Assembly election: Pernambut
Party	Candidate	Votes	%	±%
DMK	A. Chinnasamy	65,805	50.05%	
AIADMK	S. Chandra Settu	48,890	37.18%	−21.89%
DMDK	H. Kandappan	12,296	9.35%	
Independent	Chinnuswamy	1,527	1.16%	
BSP	P. Subramani	1,042	0.79%	−0.62%
BJP	R. Panneerselvam	1,023	0.78%	−32.22%
Independent	S. Karunanithi	908	0.69%	
Margin of victory		16,915	12.86%	−13.21%
Turnout		131,491	69.74%	8.82%
Registered electors		188,544		
DMK gain from AIADMK		Swing	-9.03%	
