= R. Rani =

Indian politician

R. Rani is an Indian politician and incumbent Member of the Legislative Assembly of Tamil Nadu. She was elected to the Tamil Nadu legislative assembly as a Dravida Munnetra Kazhagam candidate from Uppiliyapuram constituency in 2006 elections.
