= V. Govindan =

Indian politician (died 2021)

V. Govindan (1940/1941 – 23 October 2021) was an Indian politician who served as Member of the Legislative Assembly of Tamil Nadu. He was elected to the Tamil Nadu legislative assembly from Pernambut constituency as a Dravida Munnetra Kazhagam candidate in the 1989 and 1996 elections. The constituency was reserved for candidates from the Scheduled Castes.
