= T. Karuppusami =

Indian politician

T. Karuppusami was elected to the Tamil Nadu Legislative Assembly from the Uppiliyapuram constituency in the 1996 elections. The constituency was reserved for candidates from the Scheduled Tribes. He was a candidate of the Dravida Munnetra Kazhagam (DMK) party.
