= N. R. Alagaraja =

Indian politician

- Occupation: Politician
- Known for: Former Member of the Legislative Assembly

N. R. Alagaraja is an Indian politician and was a Member of the Legislative Assembly. His grandson Srimaan Ramachandra Raja currently serves as the All India Secretary of NSUI, the Students wing of Indian National Congress and is a key figure in Tamil Nadu congress Committee

== Career ==
Alagaraja was elected to the Tamil Nadu legislative assembly as a Tamil Maanila Congress (Moopanar) (TMC) candidate from Theni constituency in the 1996 elections. He had been runner-up as a candidate of the Indian National Congress in the same constituency in 1989. His grandson Srimaan Ramachandra Raja currently serves as the All India Secretary of NSUI, the Students wing of Indian National Congress.
