= N. Pandurangan =

Indian politician

N. Pandurangan is an Indian politician and former Member of the Legislative Assembly of Tamil Nadu. He was elected to the Tamil Nadu legislative assembly as a Dravida Munnetra Kazhagam candidate from Peranamallur constituency in the 1996 election. Now Treasurer of the District Party.
