= Peranamallur Assembly constituency =

Constituency of the Tamil Nadu Legislative Assembly in India

Coordinates: 12.57°N 79.43°E

Peranamallur
- Former constituency for the Tamil Nadu Legislative Assembly

Constituency details
- Country: India
- Region: South India
- State: Tamil Nadu
- District: Thiruvannamalai
- Lok Sabha constituency: Vandavasi
- Established: 1962
- Abolished: 2008
- Total electors: 170,898
- Reservation: None

Peranamallur is a former state assembly constituency in Tamil Nadu in present-day Tiruvanamalai district since 1989. Prior to that, it was part of North Arcot district. Elections and winners in the constituency are listed below.

== Members of the Legislative Assembly ==
| Year | Winner | Party |
|---|---|---|
Madras State
| 1962 | P. Ramachandran | Indian National Congress |
| 1967 | V. D. Annamalai Mudaliyar | Dravida Munnetra Kazhagam |
Tamil Nadu
| 1971 | P. Ettiappan | Dravida Munnetra Kazhagam |
| 1977 | P. Chandran | All India Anna Dravida Munnetra Kazhagam |
| 1980 | P. M. Venkatesan | All India Anna Dravida Munnetra Kazhagam |
| 1984 | R. Hari Kumar | All India Anna Dravida Munnetra Kazhagam |
| 1989 | R. Ettiyappan | Dravida Munnetra Kazhagam |
| 1991 | A. K. Srinivasan | All India Anna Dravida Munnetra Kazhagam |
| 1996 | N. Pandurangan | Dravida Munnetra Kazhagam |
| 2001 | A. K. S. Anbalagan | All India Anna Dravida Munnetra Kazhagam |
| 2006 | G. Edirolimanian | Pattali Makkal Katchi |

== Election results ==
Vote share of winning candidates
| 2006 | 46.47% |
| 2001 | 45.62% |
| 1996 | 52.17% |
| 1991 | 54.55% |
| 1989 | 45.86% |
| 1984 | 54.39% |
| 1980 | 44.09% |
| 1977 | 40.47% |
| 1971 | 64.50% |
| 1967 | 46.25% |
| 1962 | 49.50% |

=== 2006 ===
2006 Tamil Nadu Legislative Assembly election: Peranamallur
| Party | Candidate | Votes | % | ±% |
|---|---|---|---|---|
| PMK | G. Ediroli Manian | 56,331 | 46.47% | |
| AIADMK | A. K. S. Anbalagan | 49,643 | 40.95% | −4.67% |
| DMDK | A. Gopinathan | 9,149 | 7.55% | |
| Independent | L. K. Mani | 2,105 | 1.74% | |
| BSP | K. Anbukannan | 1,163 | 0.96% | |
| BJP | P. M. Vengatesan | 1,071 | 0.88% | |
| Independent | K. Mani | 979 | 0.81% | |
| Independent | R. Dhanusu | 790 | 0.65% | |
| Margin of victory | | 6,688 | 5.52% | −1.73% |
| Turnout | | 121,231 | 70.94% | 4.81% |
| Registered electors | | 170,898 | | |
| PMK gain from AIADMK | | Swing | 0.85% | |

=== 2001 ===
2001 Tamil Nadu Legislative Assembly election: Peranamallur
| Party | Candidate | Votes | % | ±% |
|---|---|---|---|---|
| AIADMK | A. K. S. Anbalagan | 52,625 | 45.62% | 18.49% |
| MTD | B. Bose | 44,266 | 38.37% | |
| Independent | C. S. Shanmugasundaram | 9,054 | 7.85% | |
| Independent | R. M. Venugobalan | 2,721 | 2.36% | |
| MDMK | R. Murugan | 1,846 | 1.60% | |
| JD(S) | J. Jayakaran Joseph | 1,590 | 1.38% | |
| Independent | P. M. Venkatesan | 962 | 0.83% | |
| Independent | V. Murugan | 902 | 0.78% | |
| Independent | A. Ramakrishnan | 759 | 0.66% | |
| Independent | V. Thiyagarajan | 324 | 0.28% | |
| Independent | C. Dharanendira Kumar | 306 | 0.27% | |
| Margin of victory | | 8,359 | 7.25% | −17.79% |
| Turnout | | 115,355 | 66.13% | −3.66% |
| Registered electors | | 174,454 | | |
| AIADMK gain from DMK | | Swing | -6.55% | |

=== 1996 ===
1996 Tamil Nadu Legislative Assembly election: Peranamallur
| Party | Candidate | Votes | % | ±% |
|---|---|---|---|---|
| DMK | N. Pandurangan | 57,907 | 52.17% | 23.78% |
| AIADMK | C. Srinivasan | 30,114 | 27.13% | −27.43% |
| PMK | M. Durai | 20,143 | 18.15% | |
| Independent | G. Ramanujalu | 1,379 | 1.24% | |
| Independent | S. Aruldoss | 467 | 0.42% | |
| Independent | S. S. Rajamanickam | 320 | 0.29% | |
| Independent | R. Krishnan | 282 | 0.25% | |
| Independent | A. Anbudoss | 230 | 0.21% | |
| Independent | M. Annamalai | 163 | 0.15% | |
| Margin of victory | | 27,793 | 25.04% | −1.13% |
| Turnout | | 111,005 | 69.78% | 1.20% |
| Registered electors | | 166,984 | | |
| DMK gain from AIADMK | | Swing | -2.39% | |

=== 1991 ===
1991 Tamil Nadu Legislative Assembly election: Peranamallur
| Party | Candidate | Votes | % | ±% |
|---|---|---|---|---|
| AIADMK | A. K. Srinivasan | 56,653 | 54.55% | 27.65% |
| DMK | G. Subramaniyan | 29,481 | 28.39% | −17.47% |
| PMK | L. Anandan | 17,712 | 17.06% | |
| {{{party}}} | {{{candidate}}} | {{{votes}}} | {{{percentage}}} | |
| Margin of victory | | 27,172 | 26.17% | 7.21% |
| Turnout | | 103,846 | 68.58% | 3.22% |
| Registered electors | | 158,084 | | |
| AIADMK gain from DMK | | Swing | 8.70% | |

=== 1989 ===
1989 Tamil Nadu Legislative Assembly election: Peranamallur
| Party | Candidate | Votes | % | ±% |
|---|---|---|---|---|
| DMK | R. Ettiyappan | 41,908 | 45.86% | 4.62% |
| AIADMK | Jacob Jaison | 24,588 | 26.90% | −27.48% |
| INC | C. K. Natarajan | 14,972 | 16.38% | |
| AIADMK | R. Hari Kumar | 5,585 | 6.11% | −48.28% |
| Independent | M. Selvaraj | 2,270 | 2.48% | |
| Independent | M. Ramalingam | 646 | 0.71% | |
| Independent | R. Jayamary | 308 | 0.34% | |
| Independent | S. Aruldass | 306 | 0.33% | |
| Independent | K. Punithavathi | 290 | 0.32% | |
| Independent | N. R. Sriramulu | 264 | 0.29% | |
| Independent | D. S. Thirunavukkarasu | 156 | 0.17% | |
| Margin of victory | | 17,320 | 18.95% | 5.80% |
| Turnout | | 91,392 | 65.36% | −10.64% |
| Registered electors | | 142,908 | | |
| DMK gain from AIADMK | | Swing | -8.53% | |

=== 1984 ===
1984 Tamil Nadu Legislative Assembly election: Peranamallur
| Party | Candidate | Votes | % | ±% |
|---|---|---|---|---|
| AIADMK | R. Hari Kumar | 49,591 | 54.39% | 10.30% |
| DMK | A. Rajendran | 37,599 | 41.24% | |
| Independent | M. Thellu Dharumarasan | 1,674 | 1.84% | |
| Independent | M. M. Balaraman | 1,445 | 1.58% | |
| Independent | Subramania Gounder | 319 | 0.35% | |
| Independent | K. Narayanasami | 297 | 0.33% | |
| Independent | M. Loganatha Achari | 255 | 0.28% | |
| Margin of victory | | 11,992 | 13.15% | 11.97% |
| Turnout | | 91,180 | 76.00% | 13.77% |
| Registered electors | | 127,862 | | |
| AIADMK hold | | Swing | 10.30% | |

=== 1980 ===
1980 Tamil Nadu Legislative Assembly election: Peranamallur
| Party | Candidate | Votes | % | ±% |
|---|---|---|---|---|
| AIADMK | P. M. Venkitesan | 32,645 | 44.09% | 3.62% |
| INC | R. Margabandu | 31,767 | 42.90% | 32.02% |
| JP | S. Parswanathan | 8,275 | 11.18% | |
| Independent | N. V. Ilango | 1,356 | 1.83% | |
| Margin of victory | | 878 | 1.19% | −10.49% |
| Turnout | | 74,043 | 62.23% | 2.88% |
| Registered electors | | 121,318 | | |
| AIADMK hold | | Swing | 3.62% | |

=== 1977 ===
1977 Tamil Nadu Legislative Assembly election: Peranamallur
| Party | Candidate | Votes | % | ±% |
|---|---|---|---|---|
| AIADMK | P. Chandran | 27,860 | 40.47% | |
| DMK | P. Ettappan | 19,822 | 28.79% | −35.70% |
| JP | D. Subramanian | 11,685 | 16.97% | |
| INC | D. Krishnaswamy Naidu | 7,495 | 10.89% | −24.62% |
| Independent | A. John Xavier | 1,813 | 2.63% | |
| Independent | C. S. Padmanabhan | 165 | 0.24% | |
| Margin of victory | | 8,038 | 11.68% | −17.32% |
| Turnout | | 68,840 | 59.35% | −13.85% |
| Registered electors | | 117,644 | | |
| AIADMK gain from DMK | | Swing | -24.03% | |

=== 1971 ===
1971 Tamil Nadu Legislative Assembly election: Peranamallur
| Party | Candidate | Votes | % | ±% |
|---|---|---|---|---|
| DMK | P. Ettiappan | 39,160 | 64.50% | 18.25% |
| INC | Boopalan | 21,557 | 35.50% | 3.70% |
| Margin of victory | | 17,603 | 28.99% | 14.55% |
| Turnout | | 60,717 | 73.20% | −6.46% |
| Registered electors | | 85,345 | | |
| DMK hold | | Swing | 18.25% | |

=== 1967 ===
1967 Madras Legislative Assembly election: Peranamallur
| Party | Candidate | Votes | % | ±% |
|---|---|---|---|---|
| DMK | V. D. Anamalai Mudaliar | 29,413 | 46.25% | 13.83% |
| INC | P. Ramachandran | 20,225 | 31.80% | −17.70% |
| Independent | P. Ettiappan | 10,714 | 16.85% | |
| Independent | D. K. Naidu | 2,480 | 3.90% | |
| Independent | D. Subramaniam | 769 | 1.21% | |
| Margin of victory | | 9,188 | 14.45% | −2.64% |
| Turnout | | 63,601 | 79.66% | 8.27% |
| Registered electors | | 85,233 | | |
| DMK gain from INC | | Swing | -3.25% | |

=== 1962 ===
1962 Madras Legislative Assembly election: Peranamallur
| Party | Candidate | Votes | % | ±% |
|---|---|---|---|---|
| INC | P. Ramachandran | 24,817 | 49.50% | |
| DMK | V. D. Anamalai Mudaliar | 16,252 | 32.41% | |
| SWA | P.Ettiyappa Gounder | 6,670 | 13.30% | |
| Independent | P. K. Adikesava Mudaliar | 2,400 | 4.79% | |
| Margin of victory | | 8,565 | 17.08% | |
| Turnout | | 50,139 | 71.38% | |
| Registered electors | | 74,329 | | |
| INC win (new seat) | | | | |
