= R. Saroja =

Indian politician

R. Saroja is an Indian politician and former Member of the Legislative Assembly of Tamil Nadu. She was elected to the Tamil Nadu legislative assembly as an All India Anna Dravida Munnetra Kazhagam candidate from Uppiliyapuram constituency in 1984 and 2001 elections.
