= M. Tamilkudimagan =

Indian politician and academic

- மு. தமிழ்க்குடிமகன்
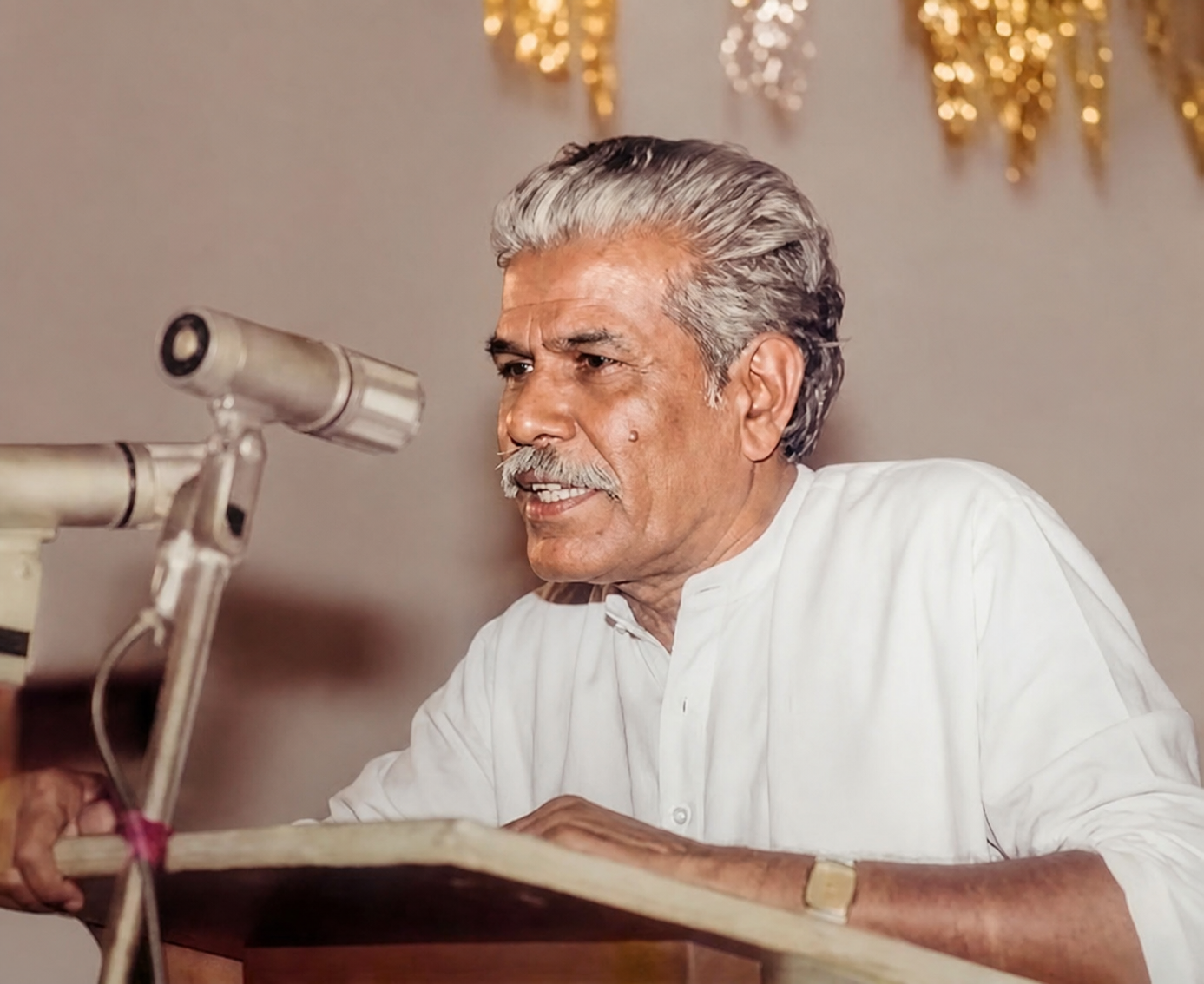
- Portrait photograph of M. Tamilkudimagan

7th Speaker of the Tamil Nadu Legislative Assembly
- In office 1989–1991
- Preceded by: P. H. Pandian
- Succeeded by: R. Muthiah

Minister for Tamil Language and Culture
- In office 1996–2001

Personal details
- Party: Dravida Munnetra Kazhagam (DMK); Later All India Anna Dravida Munnetra Kazhagam (AIADMK)
- Spouse: Vetri Selvi
- Children: 4
- Occupation: Politician, academic

M. Tamilkudimagan (Tamil: மு. தமிழ்க்குடிமகன்) was an Indian politician, academic and Member of the Tamil Nadu Legislative Assembly who served as Speaker of the Tamil Nadu Legislative Assembly from 1989 to 1991.

He later served as the DMK Minister for Tamil Language and Culture in the Government of Tamil Nadu from 1996 to 2001 under Chief Minister M. Karunanidhi.

Before entering full-time politics, Tamilkudimagan served as Principal of Yadava College, Madurai and was associated with Tamil literary and educational activities.

== Political career ==
Tamilkudimagan was associated with the Dravida Munnetra Kazhagam (DMK) and participated in political and public activities connected with the Dravidian movement in Tamil Nadu.

Following the 1989 Tamil Nadu Legislative Assembly election, he was elected Speaker of the Tamil Nadu Legislative Assembly during the administration headed by M. Karunanidhi.

In 1996, he was appointed Minister for Tamil Language and Culture in the Government of Tamil Nadu.

In the later phase of his political career, Tamilkudimagan joined the All India Anna Dravida Munnetra Kazhagam (AIADMK).

== Personal life ==
His original name was Sathiah. Tamilkudimagan was married to Vetri Selvi and had three sons and one daughter.

== See also ==
- Tamil Nadu Legislative Assembly
- Dravida Munnetra Kazhagam
- All India Anna Dravida Munnetra Kazhagam
- M. Karunanidhi
