= 1984 Tamil Nadu Legislative Assembly election =

Indian election

- 24 December 1984

All 234 seats in the Legislature of Tamil Nadu 118 seats needed for a majority
- Turnout: 73.47% (▲8.05%)
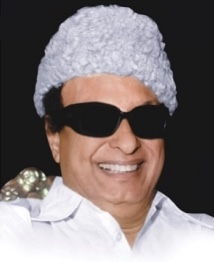

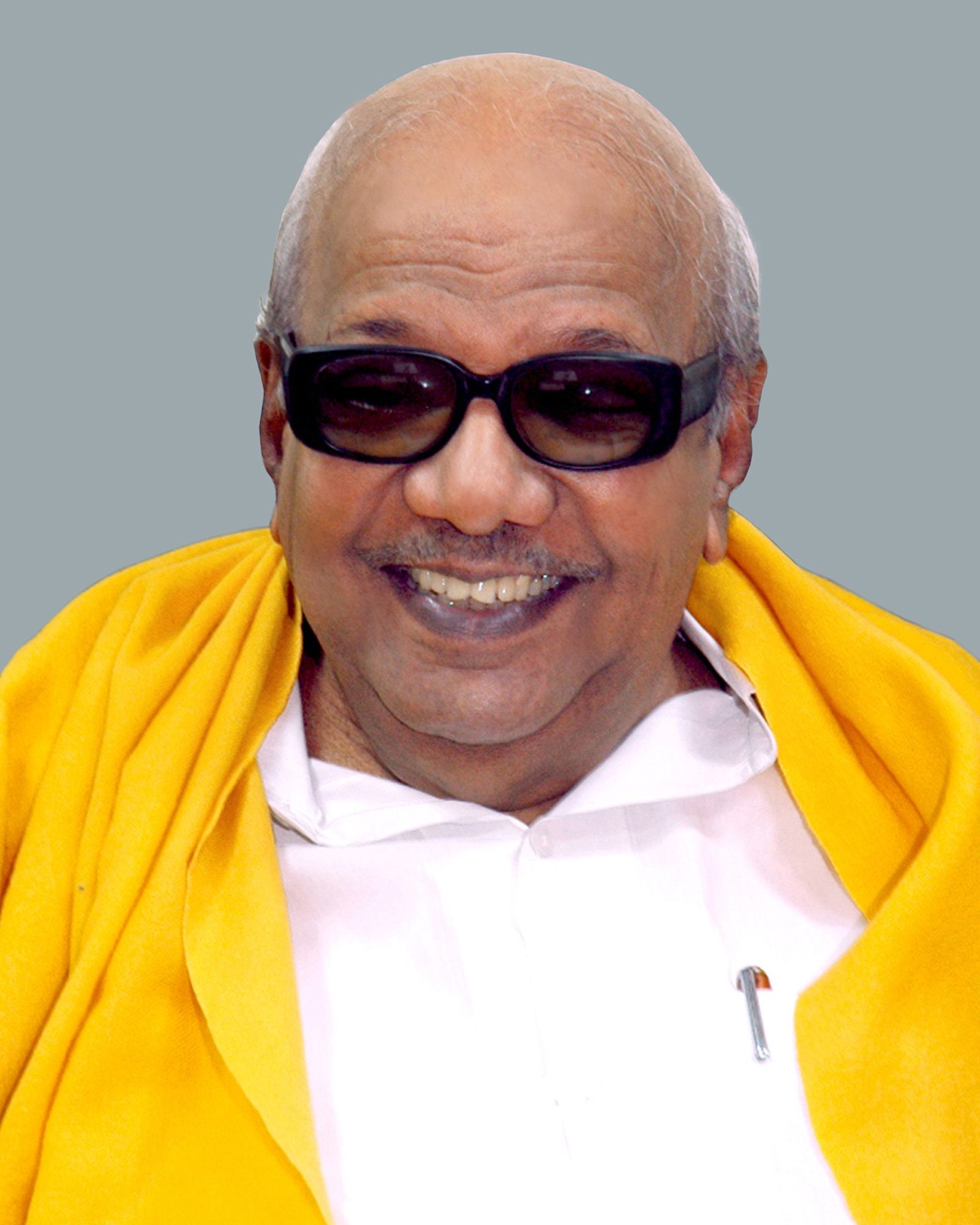
	First party	Second party
Leader	M. G. Ramachandran	M. Karunanidhi
Party	AIADMK	DMK
Alliance	INC+	Janata alliance + Left Front
Leader's seat	Andipatti	Did not contest (Note: M. Karunanidhi was elected to Legislative Council)
Seats won	132	24
Seat change	▲3	▼13
Popular vote	8,030,809	6,362,770
Percentage	37.0%	29.3%
Swing	▼1.8%	▲7.2%
Alliance seats	195	34
Alliance seat change	▲33	▼25
Alliance popular vote	11,681,221	8,021,293
Alliance percentage	53.9%	37.0%
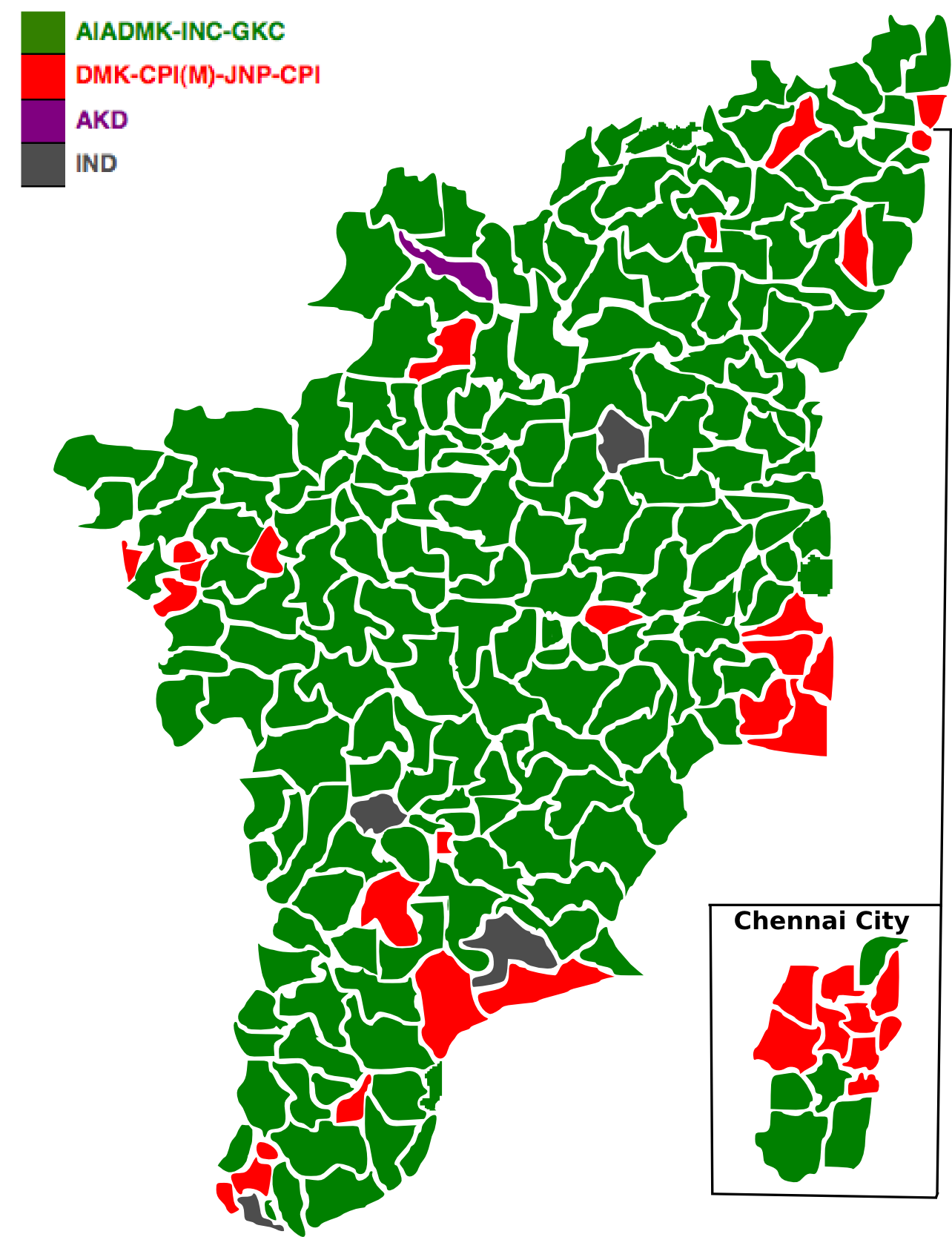
- 1984 election map (by constituencies)

- Alliance wise Result
Chief Minister before election
M. G. Ramachandran
AIADMK
Elected Chief Minister
M. G. Ramachandran
AIADMK

The eighth legislative assembly election for Tamil Nadu was held on 24 December 1984. All India Anna Dravida Munnetra Kazhagam (AIADMK) won the election and its general secretary, incumbent M. G. Ramachandran (M.G.R) was sworn in as Chief Minister, for the third time. The election victory was mainly attributed to the sympathy wave created by Indira Gandhi's assassination and M.G.R's illness coupled with Rajiv Gandhi's popularity. This is the last election M.G.R contested as he died in office in 1987. This is also the only general election which M. Karunanidhi did not contest since 1957 until his death, as he sought to avoid a direct, disadvantageous contest due to a volatile political climate. As now, this is the last election where the ruling party gained seats. All ministers from the outgoing Ramachandran cabinet, except M. Vijayasarathy, won and retained their respective constituencies.

== Schedule ==
Event	Date
Date for Nominations	20 November 1984
Last Date for filing Nominations	27 November 1984
Date for scrutiny of nominations	28 November 1984
Last date for withdrawal of candidatures	30 November 1984
Date of poll	24 December 1984
Date of counting	31 December 1984

== Background ==
Indira Gandhi was assassinated on 31 October 1984. During the same time, M. G. Ramachandran was diagnosed with kidney failure and admitted to a hospital in New York City. Rajiv Gandhi assumed office immediately. Rajiv Gandhi felt that his Government required a fresh mandate from the people, and dissolved the Lok Sabha a year before its actual end of term, for fresh general elections. At the same time, Chief minister of Tamil Nadu, M.G.R. recommended dissolution of Tamil Nadu State Assembly a year ahead of end of term, to use the sympathy wave of Congress, and also check his popularity. Indian National Congress (Indira) and All India Anna Dravida Munnetra Kazhagam formed an alliance and contested both general elections.

== Parties ==
National parties Bharatiya Janta Party, Communist Party of India, Communist Party of India (Marxist), Indian National Congress and Janata Party, state parties All India Anna Dravida Munnetra Kazhagam, Dravida Munnetra Kazhagam, Indian Congress (J), and registered unrecognised parties Ambedkar Kranti Dal, Gandhi Kamaraj National and Tamil Nadu Congress (K) contested the election.

== Seat allocation ==
The allocation of seats was later dubbed "The M.G.R. formula". Where the regional party would contest 70% of the assembly seats and the national party would be given 70% of the Lok Sabha seats. This would be the last election M.G.R contested, due to his death during his chief ministership.

== Campaigning ==
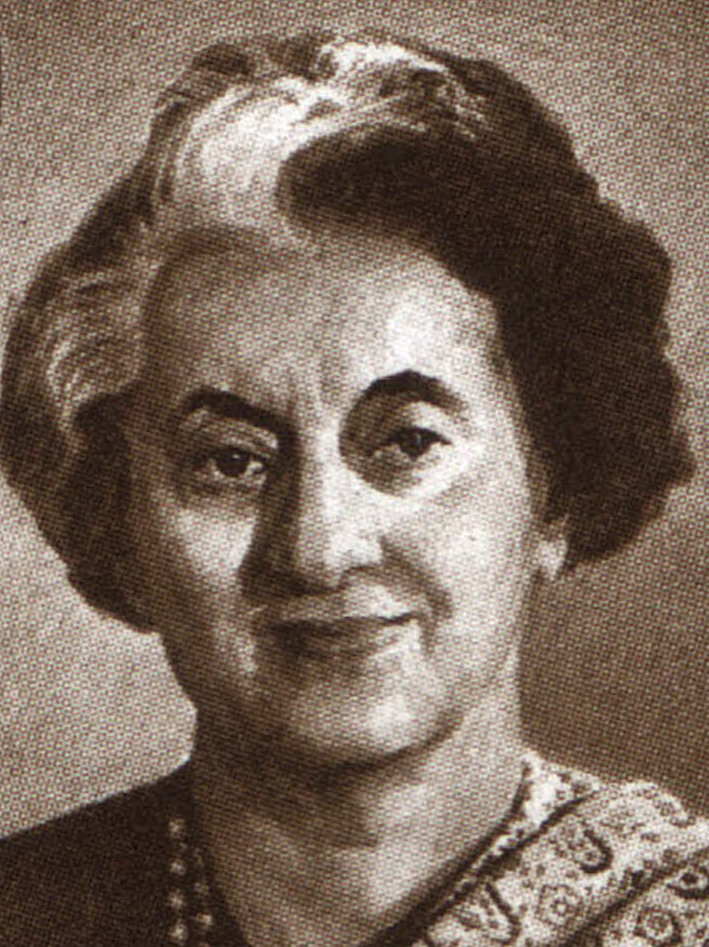
Indira Gandhi
1917–1984

The election was held in the aftermath of the assassination of Prime Minister Indira Gandhi on 31 October 1984, with the premature dissolution of both the Lok Sabha and the Tamil Nadu Assembly to capitalise on the ensuing sympathy wave

M. G. Ramachandran was confined to the hospital. During the campaign, DMK President M. Karunanidhi stated that he would step down if elected and hand over the government to his ailing friend, MGR, who was undergoing treatment in the United States, upon his return after recovery. At the same time, he raised serious doubts about Ramachandran’s health and his ability to govern. He also criticized the AIADMK’s seven-year rule, alleging a rise in poverty and unemployment. He also contended that the MGR's nutritious noon-meal scheme was an expansion of an initiative originally introduced by K. Kamaraj, and declared that the forthcoming election would mark a new chapter in Tamil Nadu’s history.

Launching the Tamil Nadu election campaign at Coimbatore in the absence of MGR, Prime Minister Rajiv Gandhi stated that India could not ignore the plight of Sri Lankan Tamils and urged the Sri Lankan government to address the crisis. AICC General Secretary G. K. Moopanar clarified that the Congress would not take part in AIADMK ministry. He emphasized that the Congress–AIADMK alliance was formed to secure a mandate against divisive and secessionist forces, adding that former Prime Minister Indira Gandhi had approved the arrangement based on MGR’s earlier assurances.

Reports indicated that supporters of R. M. Veerappan attempted to sideline then Rajya Sabha MP and Former Propaganda Secretary J. Jayalalithaa within the party. The statements were circulated claiming that she would not campaign. However, following discussions involving Prime Minister Rajiv Gandhi and the Indian National Congress, she was permitted to participate, As both sides realized that open warfare would destroy the party's chances. They agreed to split responsibilities. Veerappan stayed in Chennai to handle the backend machinery, seat sharing with allies, and government logistics. On the other side, Jayalalithaa’s campaign drew large crowds, as many voters sought reassurance regarding MGR’s health. She stated, “The leader is doing well… he will return” (“Thalaivar nalamaga irukkar… meendum varuvaar”) and also appealed to voters by saying, “See MGR in my face” (“En mugathil neengal MGR-ai paarungal”). Beginning on 3 December 1984 from Andipatti Constituency, where MGR was nominated to contest after his signed authorization was obtained in the presence of Ram Dass, a consular agent of the Consulate General of India in New York, alongside Tamil Nadu Health Minister H. V. Hande on November 21 from a hospital in the United States, Jayalalithaa undertook a 21-day statewide tour covering regions including Tirunelveli, Madurai, Ramanathapuram, Coimbatore, Erode, and Salem. She adopted a “question-and-answer” style campaign, addressing public queries and responding to claims by the opposition Dravida Munnetra Kazhagam regarding MGR’s health. Her campaign was widely reported to have helped compensate for MGR’s absence and contributed to the electoral success of the AIADMK.

"Andavane Un Paadhangalai" ("O God, at Your Feet"), an emotional prayer song from the 1968 MGR-starrer Oli Vilakku, was revived decades later and widely played across Tamil Nadu amid party workers' apprehension over a future without MGR, with the polling day approaching. Slogans such as “Thaayilla pillai-kku oru vote” (“a vote for the motherless child”), “Vaayilla pillai-kku oru vote” (“a vote for the voiceless child”), “Saavukku oru vote” (“a vote for death”), and “Novukku oru vote” (“a vote for the ailing”) were widely used by AIADMK cadres. Video coverage of M.G.R recuperating in hospital, eating meat and gesturing the AIADMK’s “Two Leaves” symbol, edited by S. P. Muthuraman along with Indira Gandhi's assassination were stitched together by AIADMK man in charge of campaigning R. M. Veerappan. He underwent a kidney transplant on 19 December 1987. The video was distributed and played across all over Tamil Nadu. AIADMK also stuck pictures on street walls showing MGR recuperating in hospital. Rajiv Gandhi visited cyclone-hit areas in Tamil Nadu which also created a major political sensation and boosted the alliance. The sympathy wave created by Indira's assassination, M.G.R's illness and Rajiv Gandhi's charisma helped the alliance sweep the election. DMK leader M. Karunanidhi did not contest this election, due to the fact that the AIADMK founder M.G.R was admitted to a hospital in the U.S. and Indira Gandhi being assassinated.

== Seat Allotment ==
=== Congress-AIADMK Front ===
AIADMK-led Alliance
Party	Flag	Symbol	Leader	Seats	
All India Anna Dravida Munnetra Kazhagam			M. G. Ramachandran	155	156
Republican Party of India (Khobragade)				1	156
Indian National Congress			M. Palaniyandi	71 (Note: Park Town and Chinnasalem Candidates of Congress Enlisted as independents.) +4 (Note: Friendly contests between ADMK and INC in the following constituencies: 136–Sedapatti, 146–Melur, 150–Vedasandur, and 221–Ambasamudram.)	
Gandhi Kamaraj National Congress			Kumari Ananthan	4	
Forward Bloc (Note: Forward Bloc Contested as Independent.)			S. Andi Thevar	3	
Total				234	

=== DMK Progressive Alliance ===
DMK Progressive Alliance
Party	Flag	Symbol	Leader	Seats	
Dravida Munnetra Kazhagam			M. Karunanidhi	160	168
Indian Union Muslim League			A. K. A. Abdul Samad	6	168
Tamil Nadu Forward Bloc (Note: Tamil Nadu Forward Bloc Contested as Independent on Usilampatti and Rising Sun symbol on Andipatti and Sedapatti constituencies.)			P. N. Vallarasu	2	168
Communist Party of India			P. Manickam	17	
Communist Party of India (Marxist)			A. Nallasivam	16	
Janata Party			Era Sezhiyan	15 + 1 (Note: Friendly contests between DMK and JP in the Kumbakonam (187))	
Uzhavar Uzhaippalar Katchi (Note: Contested as independents)			Narayanasamy Naidu	10	
Tamil Nadu Kamaraj Congress			Pazha. Nedumaran	5	
Independent				2	
Tamil Nadu Forward Bloc			P. K. M. Muthuramalinga Thevar	1	
Total				234	

== List of Candidates ==
District	Constituency		AIADMK+		DMK+	
District	#	Name (Note: SC and ST indicate constituencies reserved for Scheduled Castes and Scheduled Tribes respectively.)	Party	Candidate	Party	Candidate
Madras	1	Royapuram	GKC	K. Rajan	DMK	P. Punnurangam
Madras	2	Harbour	ADMK	K. Liakath Ali Khan	DMK	A. Selvarasan
Madras	3	R. K. Nagar	INC	S. Venugopal	DMK	S. P. Sargunam
Madras	4	Park Town	IND	M. Jothi	DMK	K. Anbazhagan
Madras	5	Perambur (SC)	ADMK	Sathiavani Muthu	DMK	Parithi Elamvazhuthi
Madras	6	Purasawalkam	ADMK	K. Suppu	DMK	Nanjil K. Manoharan
Madras	7	Egmore (SC)	INC	K. R. Sri Ramulu	DMK	S. Balan
Madras	8	Anna Nagar	ADMK	V. Kothandaraman	DMK	S. M. Ramachandran
Madras	9	Theagaraya Nagar	INC	K. Sourirajan	JP	G. Kalivaradan
Madras	10	Thousand Lights	ADMK	K. A. Krishnasamy	DMK	M. K. Stalin
Madras	11	Chepauk	ADMK	S. V. Marimuthu	DMK	A. Rahman Khan
Madras	12	Triplicane	INC	K. S. G. Haja Shareeff	DMK	A. K. A. Abdul Samad (Note: Indian Union Muslim League contested on the "Rising Sun" symbol of the Dravida Munnetra Kazhagam (DMK), and is officially recorded as a DMK candidate in electoral records.)
Madras	13	Mylapore	ADMK	B. Valarmathi	DMK	R. S. Bharathi
Madras	14	Saidapet	ADMK	Saidai Duraisamy	DMK	D. Purushothaman
Chengalpattu	15	Gummidipundi	ADMK	R. S. Munirathinam	DMK	K. Vezhavendan
Chengalpattu	16	Ponneri (SC)	ADMK	K. P. K. Sekar	DMK	K. Sundaram
Chengalpattu	17	Thiruvottiyur	INC	G. K. J. Bharathi	DMK	T. K. Palaniswamy
Chengalpattu	18	Villivakkam	ADMK	J. C. D. Prabhakar	CPI(M)	V. P. Chintan
Chengalpattu	19	Alandur	ADMK	R. Mohanarangam	DMK	M. Abragham
Chengalpattu	20	Tambaram	ADMK	Ella Rajamanickam	DMK	M. A. Vaidialingam
Chengalpattu	21	Tirupporur (SC)	ADMK	Thamizhmani	DMK	G. Chokkalingam
Chengalpattu	22	Chengalpattu	ADMK	G. Annor Jegadesan	DMK	V. Rudrakotti
Chengalpattu	23	Maduranthakam	INC	Sachuthanandam	DMK	G. Arumugam
Chengalpattu	24	Acharapakkam (SC)	ADMK	K. Ethirajan	DMK	E. Ramakrishnan
Chengalpattu	25	Uthiramerur	ADMK	K. Narasimma Pallavan	DMK	C. V. M. A. Ponmozhi
Chengalpattu	26	Kancheepuram	ADMK	K. Balaji	DMK	C. M. Palani Raja Kumar
Chengalpattu	27	Sriperumbudur (SC)	INC	D. Yashoda	DMK	K. M. Panchatcharam
Chengalpattu	28	Poonamallee	INC	G. Ananthakrishna	DMK	D. Rajarathinam
Chengalpattu	29	Tiruvallur	ADMK	S. Pattabiraman	DMK	S. R. Munirathinam
Chengalpattu	30	Tiruttani	ADMK	R. Shanmugam	JP	C. Chiranjeevulu Naidu
Chengalpattu	31	Pallipet	ADMK	P. m. Narasimhan	IND	A. Eakambaram (Note: Uzhavar Uzhaippalar Katchi contested on the "Independent" symbol, and is officially recorded as an independent candidate in electoral records.)
North Arcot	32	Arakkonam (SC)	ADMK	M. Vijayasarathi	DMK	V. K. Raju
North Arcot	33	Sholinghur	ADMK	N. Shunmugam	DMK	K. Moorthi
North Arcot	34	Ranipet	INC	M. Kadirvelu	DMK	V. M. Abdul Jabbar
North Arcot	35	Arcot	ADMK	T. Palani	DMK	Arcot Veeraswamy
North Arcot	36	Katpadi	ADMK	G. Raghupathi	DMK	Duraimurugan
North Arcot	37	Gudiyatham	INC	R. Govindasamy	CPI(M)	K. R. Sundaram
North Arcot	38	Pernambut (SC)	ADMK	C. K. Thamizharasan (Note: Republican Party of India (Khobragade) contested on the "Two Leaves" symbol of the All India Anna Dravida Munnetra Kazhagam (AIADMK), and is officially recorded as a AIADMK candidate in electoral records.)	DMK	V. Govindan
North Arcot	39	Vaniayambadi	INC	H. Abdul Majeed	DMK	A. P. Abdul Majid
North Arcot	40	Natrampalli	ADMK	T. Anbazhagan	DMK	N. K. Raja
North Arcot	41	Tiruppattur	INC	Y. Shanmugam	DMK	B. Sundaram
North Arcot	42	Chengam (SC)	ADMK	T. Swamikannu	JP	P. Anbalagan
North Arcot	43	Thandarambattu	ADMK	E. Vachiravelu	DMK	D. Venugopal
North Arcot	44	Tiruvannamalai	INC	A. S. Ravindran	DMK	S. Murugaiyan
North Arcot	45	Kalasapakkam	ADMK	M. Pandurangan	DMK	P. S. Thiruvengadam
North Arcot	46	Polur	INC	J. Rajababu	DMK	T. K. Subramantan
North Arcot	47	Anaicut	ADMK	V. R. Krishnasamy	IND	P. N. Rajagopal
North Arcot	48	Vellore	ADMK	A. K. Ranganathan	DMK	V. M. Devaraj
North Arcot	49	Arni	ADMK	M. Chinnakulandai	DMK	R. Sivanandam
North Arcot	50	Cheyyar	ADMK	K. Murugan	DMK	Babu Janarthanam
North Arcot	51	Vandavashi (SC)	INC	A. Arumugham	DMK	V. Rajagopal
North Arcot	52	Peranamallur	ADMK	R. Hari Kumar	DMK	A. Rajendran
South Arcot	53	Melmalayanur	ADMK	P. U. Shanmugam	DMK	P. R. Aranganathan
South Arcot	54	Gingee	INC	T. N. Muruganandam	DMK	Gingee Ramachandran
South Arcot	55	Tindivanam	INC	K. M. Thangamani	JP	Subramanya Kounder
South Arcot	56	Vanur (SC)	ADMK	M. N. Ramajayam	DMK	A. Poopalan
South Arcot	57	Kandamangalam (SC)	ADMK	V. Subramaniyan	DMK	S. Alaguvelu
South Arcot	58	Villupuram	ADMK	M. Rajarathinam Mani	DMK	K. P. Palaniappan
South Arcot	59	Mugaiyur	ADMK	M. Chandrasekar	DMK	A. G. Sampath
South Arcot	60	Thirunavalur	ADMK	T. N. G. A. Menoharan	DMK	A. V. Balasubramanian
South Arcot	61	Ulundurpet (SC)	ADMK	M. Anandan	DMK	K. Varaharajulu
South Arcot	62	Nellikuppam	ADMK	Anbarasan Ramalingam	CPI(M)	Govindarajan
South Arcot	63	Cuddalore	INC	V. G. Cheelappa	DMK	V. Krishnamurthy
South Arcot	64	Panruti	ADMK	Panruti Ramachandran	DMK	K. Nandagopala Krishnan
South Arcot	65	Kurinjipadi	ADMK	A. Thangarasu	DMK	C. Kuppusami
South Arcot	66	Bhuvanagiri	ADMK	V. V. Swaminathan	DMK	Durai Krishnamoorthy
South Arcot	67	Kattumannarkoil (SC)	INC	S. Jayachandran	DMK	K. P. Thangaswamy
South Arcot	68	Chidambaram	ADMK	K. R. Ganpathi	DMK	K. S. Subramanian
South Arcot	69	Vridhachalam	INC	R. Thiyagarajan	DMK	D. Rasavelu
South Arcot	70	Mangalore (SC)	ADMK	S. Thangaraju	DMK	N. Muthuvel
South Arcot	71	Rishivandiam	INC	S. Sivaraj	DMK	M. Natesha Udayar
South Arcot	72	Chinnasalem	IND	S. Sivaraman	DMK	D. Periyasamy
South Arcot	73	Sankarapuram	ADMK	S. Kalitherthan	DMK	K. Venkatapathy
Dharmapuri	74	Hosur	INC	T. Venkata Reddy	JP	E. Venkatasamy
Dharmapuri	75	Thalli	INC	K. V. Venugopal	JP	D. C. Vijayendraiah
Dharmapuri	76	Kaveripattinam	ADMK	K. Samarasam	DMK	V. C. Govindasamy
Dharmapuri	77	Krishnagiri	ADMK	K. R. Chinnaraju	DMK	Kanchana
Dharmapuri	78	Bargur	ADMK	T. M. Venkatachalam	DMK	P. V. Veeramani
Dharmapuri	79	Harur (SC)	ADMK	R. Rajamanickam	CPI(M)	M. Annamalai
Dharmapuri	80	Morappur	INC	T. Theerthagiri Gounder	DMK	V. Samikannu
Dharmapuri	81	Palacode	INC	P. Theertharaman	DMK	M. B. Munusamigounder
Dharmapuri	82	Dharamapuri	ADMK	S. Aranganathan	DMK	R. Chinnasamy
Dharmapuri	83	Pennagaram	ADMK	H. G. Arumugam	CPI	N. Nanjappan
Salem	84	Mettur	ADMK	K. P. Nachimuthu	CPI(M)	M. Seerangan
Salem	85	Taramangalam	ADMK	S. Semmalai	DMK	K. Arjunan
Salem	86	Omalur	INC	Anbalagan	CPI	S. Kuppusamy
Salem	87	Yercaud (ST)	INC	P. R. Thirugnanam	DMK	K. Manickam
Salem	88	Salem-I	ADMK	G. Krishnaraj	DMK	G. K. Subasu
Salem	89	Salem-II	ADMK	Arumugam	DMK	Veerapandi S. Arumugam
Salem	90	Veerapandi	ADMK	P. Vijayalakshmi Palanisamy	DMK	Subramaniams
Salem	91	Panamarathupatty	ADMK	K. Rajaram	DMK	S. R. Sivalingam
Salem	92	Attur	INC	C. Palanimuthu	DMK	A. M. Ramaswamy
Salem	93	Talavasal (SC)	INC	T. Rajambal	DMK	R. Ravichandar
Salem	94	Rasipuram	ADMK	K. P. Ramalingam	DMK	P. Kaliappan
Salem	95	Sendamangalam (ST)	ADMK	S. Sivaprakasam	DMK	S. Kalavathi
Salem	96	Namakkal (SC)	ADMK	R. Arunachalam	DMK	K. Veluchami
Salem	97	Kapilamalai	INC	P. Sengottaiyan	IND	K. A. Mani
Salem	98	Tiruchengode	ADMK	C. Ponnaiyan	DMK	M. M. Kandasamy
Salem	99	Sankari (SC)	ADMK	P. Dhanapal	DMK	S. Murugesan
Salem	100	Edapadi	INC	Govindaswamy	DMK	P. Arumugam
Coimbatore	101	Mettupalayam	ADMK	M. Chinnaraj	DMK	M. Mathiyan
Coimbatore	102	Avanashi (SC)	ADMK	P. Lakshmi	CPI	M. Arumugam
Coimbatore	103	Thondamuthur	ADMK	Aranganayakam	CPI(M)	U. K. Vellingiri
Coimbatore	104	Singanallur	INC	A. Subramaniam	JP	R. Sengalippan
Coimbatore	105	Coimbatore West	INC	M. A. Hakkeem	DMK	M. Ramanathan
Coimbatore	106	Coimbatore East	ADMK	Kovai Thambi	CPI(M)	K. Ramani
Coimbatore	107	Perur	ADMK	K. Marudasalam	DMK	A. Natarasan
Coimbatore	108	Kinathukkadavu	ADMK	K. V. Kandasamy	DMK	M. Kannappan
Coimbatore	109	Pollachi	ADMK	M. V. Rathinam	DMK	S. Raju
Coimbatore	110	Valparai (SC)	INC	V. Thangavelu	CPI	A. T. Karuppiah
Coimbatore	111	Udumalpet	INC	S. Thirumalaisamy Gounder	DMK	R. T. Mariyappan
Coimbatore	112	Dharapuram (SC)	ADMK	A. Periasamy	DMK	R. Ayyasamy
Coimbatore	113	Vellakoil	ADMK	Durai Ramasamy	DMK	Appan Palanisamy
Coimbatore	114	Pongalur	ADMK	P. Kandaswamy	IND	N. S. Palanisamy
Coimbatore	115	Palladam	ADMK	P. N. Paramasiva Gounder	IND	Sivasamy
Coimbatore	116	Tiruppur	ADMK	R. Manimaran	CPI	K. Subbarayan
Coimbatore	117	Kangayam	ADMK	K. C. Palanisamy	DMK	M. Sivasabapathy
Erode	118	Modakurichi	ADMK	S. Balakrishnan	DMK	A. Ganeshamurthy
Erode	119	Perundurai	ADMK	A. Ponnusamy	CPI	T. K. Nallappan
Erode	120	Erode	ADMK	S. Muthusamy	DMK	Subbulakshmi Jagadeesan
Erode	121	Bhavani	ADMK	P. G. Narayanan	DMK	N. K. K. Periasamy
Erode	122	Andhiyur (SC)	ADMK	U. P. Mathaiyan	DMK	S. Lakshmi
Erode	123	Gobichettipalayam	ADMK	K. A. Sengottaiyan	DMK	M. Andamuthu
Erode	124	Bhavanisagar	ADMK	V. K. Chinnsammy	JP	S. Vellingiri
Erode	125	Sathyamangalam	INC	E. V. K. S. Elangovan	DMK	T. K. Subramaniam
Nilgiris	126	Coonoor (SC)	ADMK	M. Sivakumar	DMK	M. Ranganathan
Nilgiris	127	Ootacamund	INC	K. Kallan	DMK	S. A. Mahalingam
Nilgiris	128	Gudalur	ADMK	K. Hutchi Gowder	DMK	K. Karuppusamy
Madurai	129	Palani (SC)	INC	A. S. Ponnammal	CPI(M)	N. Palanivel
Madurai	130	Oddanchatram	ADMK	K. Kuppusamy	IND	K. Chellamuthu
Madurai	131	Periyakulam	ADMK	T. Mohammed Saleem	DMK	P. N. Maya Thevar
Madurai	132	Theni	ADMK	V. R. Jeyaraman	CPI	K. T. K. Thagamani
Madurai	133	Bodinayakkanur	INC	K. S. M. Ramachandran	DMK	Muthu Manoharan
Madurai	134	Cumbum	ADMK	S. Subburayar	DMK	N. Eramakrishnan
Madurai	135	Andipatti	ADMK	M. G. Ramachandran	DMK	P. N. Vallarasu (Note: Tamil Nadu Forward Bloc contested on the "Rising Sun" symbol of the Dravida Munnetra Kazhagam (DMK), and is officially recorded as a DMK candidate in electoral records.)
Madurai	136	Sedapatti	ADMK	Sedapatti Muthiah	IND	S. S. Rajendran
Madurai	136	Sedapatti	INC	N. S. Selvaraj	IND	S. S. Rajendran
Madurai	137	Thirumangalam	INC	N. S. V. Chitthan	DMK	A. Athiyanan
Madurai	138	Usilampatti	IND	S. Andi Thever (Note: Forward Bloc-led by Andi Thevar contested on the "Independent" symbol, and is officially recorded as an independent candidate in electoral records.)	IND	P. K. M. Muthuramalingam (Note: Tamil Nadu Forward Bloc contested on the "Independent" symbol, and is officially recorded as an independent candidate in electoral records.)
Madurai	139	Nilakottai (SC)	ADMK	A. Buluchamy	DMK	M. Arivazhagan
Madurai	140	Sholavandan	INC	A. Chandrasekaran	JP	S. P. Rajangam
Madurai	141	Tirupparankundram	ADMK	M. Marimuthu	DMK	A. Ayyanan Ambalam
Madurai	142	Madurai West	ADMK	S. Pandian	DMK	Pon. Muthuramalingam
Madurai	143	Madurai Central	INC	A. Deivanyagam	TNC	Pazha Nedumaran
Madurai	144	Madurai East	ADMK	K. Kalimuthu	CPI(M)	P. M. Kumar
Madurai	145	Samayanallur (SC)	ADMK	A. Sivakumar	DMK	S. Selvaraj
Madurai	146	Melur	ADMK	K. Thiyagarajan	INC(J)	A. M. Paramasivan
Madurai	146	Melur	INC	K. V. Veeranamabalam]	INC(J)	A. M. Paramasivan
Madurai	147	Natham	INC	M. Andi Ambalam	TNC	T. Alagirisamy
Madurai	148	Dindigul	ADMK	A. Premkumar	CPI(M)	N. Varadarajan
Madurai	149	Athoor	ADMK	V. R. Nedunchezhiyan	DMK	K. Rajambal
Madurai	150	Vedasandur	ADMK	V. P. Balasubramaniam	IND	P. Muthusamy
Madurai	150	Vedasandur	INC	G. S. Veerappan	IND	P. Muthusamy
Tiruchirapalli	151	Aravakurichi	ADMK	S. Jegatheesan	DMK	P. Ramasami
Tiruchirapalli	152	Karur	ADMK	K. Vadivel	DMK	K. V. Ramasamy
Tiruchirapalli	153	Krishnarayapuram (SC)	INC	P. M. Thangavelraj	DMK	K. Krishnan
Tiruchirapalli	154	Marungapuri	ADMK	K. Sholairaj	IND	P. Ramasamy
Tiruchirapalli	155	Kulithalai	ADMK	P. Musiri Puppnan	CPI	B. Karuppaiah
Tiruchirapalli	156	Thottiam	INC	Periyasamy	DMK	S. R. Vadivel
Tiruchirapalli	157	Uppiliapuram (ST)	ADMK	R. Saroja	DMK	R. Mookkayee
Tiruchirapalli	158	Musiri	ADMK	S. Rathinavelu	DMK	R. Natarajan
Tiruchirapalli	159	Lalgudi	INC	K. Venkatachalam	TNC	A. Swaminkan
Tiruchirapalli	160	Perambalur (SC)	INC	K. Nallamuthu	DMK	T. Sarojini
Tiruchirapalli	161	Varahur (SC)	ADMK	A. Arunachalam	DMK	K. Kanaga Sabai
Tiruchirapalli	162	Ariyalur	ADMK	S. Purushothaman	DMK	T. Arumugam
Tiruchirapalli	163	Andimadam	ADMK	Adhimoolam Gandhi	DMK	S. Sivasubramaniyan
Tiruchirapalli	164	Jayankondam	INC	N. Masilamani	JP	J. Pannirselvam
Tiruchirapalli	165	Srirangam	ADMK	R. Soudararajan	JP	C. Ramasamy Udayar
Tiruchirapalli	166	Tiruchirappalli-I	INC	R. Perumal	DMK	A. Malaramannan
Tiruchirapalli	167	Tiruchirappalli-II	ADMK	N. Nallusamy	DMK	Anbil Dharmalingam
Tiruchirapalli	168	Thiruverambur	ADMK	M. Guruswamy	CPI(M)	Pappa Umanath
Thanjavur	169	Sirkali (SC)	ADMK	K. Balasubramaniam	DMK	K. Paneerselvam
Thanjavur	170	Poompuhar	ADMK	N. Vijayabalan	DMK	Jama Imoideen Papa
Thanjavur	171	Mayuram	ADMK	M. Thangamani	DMK	K. Satiyaseelan
Thanjavur	172	Kuttalam	ADMK	Pappa Subbramanian	DMK	R. Rajamanickam
Thanjavur	173	Nannilam (SC)	ADMK	S. Anbarasan	DMK	M. Manimaran
Thanjavur	174	Tiruvarur (SC)	INC	P. Selvadurai	CPI(M)	M. Sellamuthu
Thanjavur	175	Nagapattinam	ADMK	S. Thenkovan	CPI(M)	G. Veeraiyan
Thanjavur	176	Vedaranyam	INC	P. V. Rajendran	DMK	Meenakshi Sundaram
Thanjavur	177	Thiruthuraipundi (SC)	ADMK	J. Archunan	CPI	P. Uthirapathi
Thanjavur	178	Mannargudi	ADMK	S. Gnanasundaram	CPI	P. Ramalingam
Thanjavur	179	Pattukkottai	ADMK	P. N. Ramachandran	DMK	A. V. Subramanian
Thanjavur	180	Peravurani	ADMK	M. R. Govendhan	CPI	A. M. Gopu
Thanjavur	181	Orathanad	ADMK	T. Veeraswamy	DMK	L. Ganesan
Thanjavur	182	Thiruvonam	INC	V. Sivagnanam	DMK	M. Ramachandran
Thanjavur	183	Thanjavur	INC	Durai Krishnamurthy	DMK	P. S. Thangamuthu
Thanjavur	184	Thiruvaiyaru	ADMK	Durai Govindarajan	TNC	A. Ramamurthy
Thanjavur	185	Papanasam	INC	S. Rajaraman	DMK	S. Sachidhanandam
Thanjavur	186	Valangiman (SC)	ADMK	Gomathi Srinivasan	DMK	N. Somasundaram Sithmalli
Thanjavur	187	Kumbakonam	INC	K. Krishnamoorthy	DMK	S. Kaliyanasudaram
Thanjavur	187	Kumbakonam	INC	K. Krishnamoorthy	JP	R. Padmanthan
Thanjavur	188	Thiruvidamarudur	INC	M. Rajangam	DMK	S. Ramalingam
Pudukottai	189	Thirumaiyam	INC	T. Pushparaj	DMK	R. Pawanan
Pudukottai	190	Kolathur (SC)	ADMK	T. Marimuthu	DMK	A. Tamilselvan Keerai
Pudukottai	191	Pudukkottai	INC	J. Mohamed Gani	CPI	K. R. Subbiah
Pudukottai	192	Alangudi	ADMK	Venkatachalam	DMK	A. Periannan
Pudukottai	193	Arantangi	ADMK	S. Thirunvukkarasu	DMK	S. Ramanathan
Ramanathapuram	194	Tiruppattur	ADMK	S. Madhavan	DMK	Pr. Algu
Ramanathapuram	195	Karaikudi	ADMK	S. P. Durairasu	DMK	C. T. Chidambaram
Ramanathapuram	196	Tiruvadanai	INC	K. Sornalingam	IND	M. Gnanaprakasam
Ramanathapuram	197	Ilayangudi	ADMK	P. Anbalangan	DMK	V. Malaikannan
Ramanathapuram	198	Sivaganga	INC	O. Subramanian	CPI	V. R. Ayyadurai
Ramanathapuram	199	Manamadurai (SC)	INC	K. Paramalai	TNC	V. Gopal
Ramanathapuram	200	Paramakudi (SC)	ADMK	K. Balauchamy	DMK	T. K. Siraimeetan
Ramanathapuram	201	Ramanathapuram	ADMK	T. Ramasamy	DMK	M. S. Abdul Raheem
Ramanathapuram	202	Kadaladi	IND	V. Sivathavilli Thevar	DMK	A. Piranavanathan
Ramanathapuram	203	Mudukulathur	IND	K. Muthuvel	DMK	S. Kather Batcha
Ramanathapuram	204	Aruppukottai	ADMK	M. Pitchai	DMK	V. Thangapandian
Ramanathapuram	205	Sattur	ADMK	K. K. S. S. R. Ramachandran	DMK	S. S. Karuppasamy
Ramanathapuram	206	Virudhunagar	ADMK	M. Sudararajan	JP	A. S. A. Arumugam
Ramanathapuram	207	Sivakasi	ADMK	V. Balakrishnan	IND	N. Perumal Samy
Ramanathapuram	208	Srivilliputhur	ADMK	R. Thamaraikkani	DMK	P. Srinivasan
Ramanathapuram	209	Rajapalayam (SC)	INC	K. Raman	CPI	I. Paulraj
Tirunelveli	210	Vilathikulam	ADMK	R. K. Perumal	DMK	S. Kumara Gurubara
Tirunelveli	211	Ottapidaram (SC)	INC	R. S. Arumugam	CPI	M. Appadurai
Tirunelveli	212	Koilpatti	INC	R. Rangasamy	CPI	S. Alagarsamy
Tirunelveli	213	Sankaranayanarkoil (SC)	ADMK	S. Sangaralingam	DMK	S. Thangavelu
Tirunelveli	214	Vasudevanallur (SC)	INC	R. Eswaran	CPI(M)	M. S. Periasamy
Tirunelveli	215	Kadayanallur	ADMK	T. Perumal	DMK	Kathiravan alias Samsudden
Tirunelveli	216	Tenkasi	INC	T. R. Venkataramanan	DMK	M. Kuthalingam
Tirunelveli	217	Alangulam	ADMK	N. Shanmuchiah Pendian	DMK	P. Thambi Thurai
Tirunelveli	218	Tirunelveli	ADMK	S. Narayanan	DMK	A. L. Subramanian
Tirunelveli	219	Palayamcottai	ADMK	V. Karuppasami Pandian	DMK	V. S. T. Shamsulalam
Tirunelveli	220	Cheranmahadevi	ADMK	P. H. Pandian	DMK	P. S. Pandian
Tirunelveli	221	Ambasamudram	ADMK	Balasubramanian	CPI(M)	A. Nallasivan
Tirunelveli	221	Ambasamudram	INC	M. Eramasamy	CPI(M)	A. Nallasivan
Tirunelveli	222	Nanguneri	ADMK	M. John Vincent	DMK	E. Namdi
Tirunelveli	223	Radhapuram	GKC	Kumari Ananthan	IND	B. Subramania Nadar
Tirunelveli	224	Sattangulam	GKC	S. N. Ramasami	JP	M. A. Ganesapandian
Tirunelveli	225	Tiruchendur	ADMK	Subramanai Anthithan	DMK	K. P. Kandasamy
Tirunelveli	226	Srivaikuntam	INC	S. Daniel Raj	DMK	S. P. Muthu
Tirunelveli	227	Tuticorin	ADMK	S. N. Rajendran	DMK	A. Ayyasamy
Kanyakumari	228	Kanniyakumari	ADMK	K. Perumal Pillay	DMK	M. Sankaraligom
Kanyakumari	229	Nagercoil	ADMK	S. Jagatheeson	DMK	S. Retnaraj
Kanyakumari	230	Colachel	ADMK	F. M. Rajarethnam	DMK	N. Paramonydhas
Kanyakumari	231	Padmanabhapuram	ADMK	M. Vincent	JP	P. D. S. Mony
Kanyakumari	232	Thiruvattar	GKC	S. Natarajan	CPI(M)	J. Hemachandran
Kanyakumari	233	Vilavancode	INC	M. Sundardas	CPI(M)	D. Moni
Kanyakumari	234	Killiyoor	INC	A. Pauliah	JP	D. Kumaradas

== Voting and results ==
=== Results by Pre-Poll Alliance ===
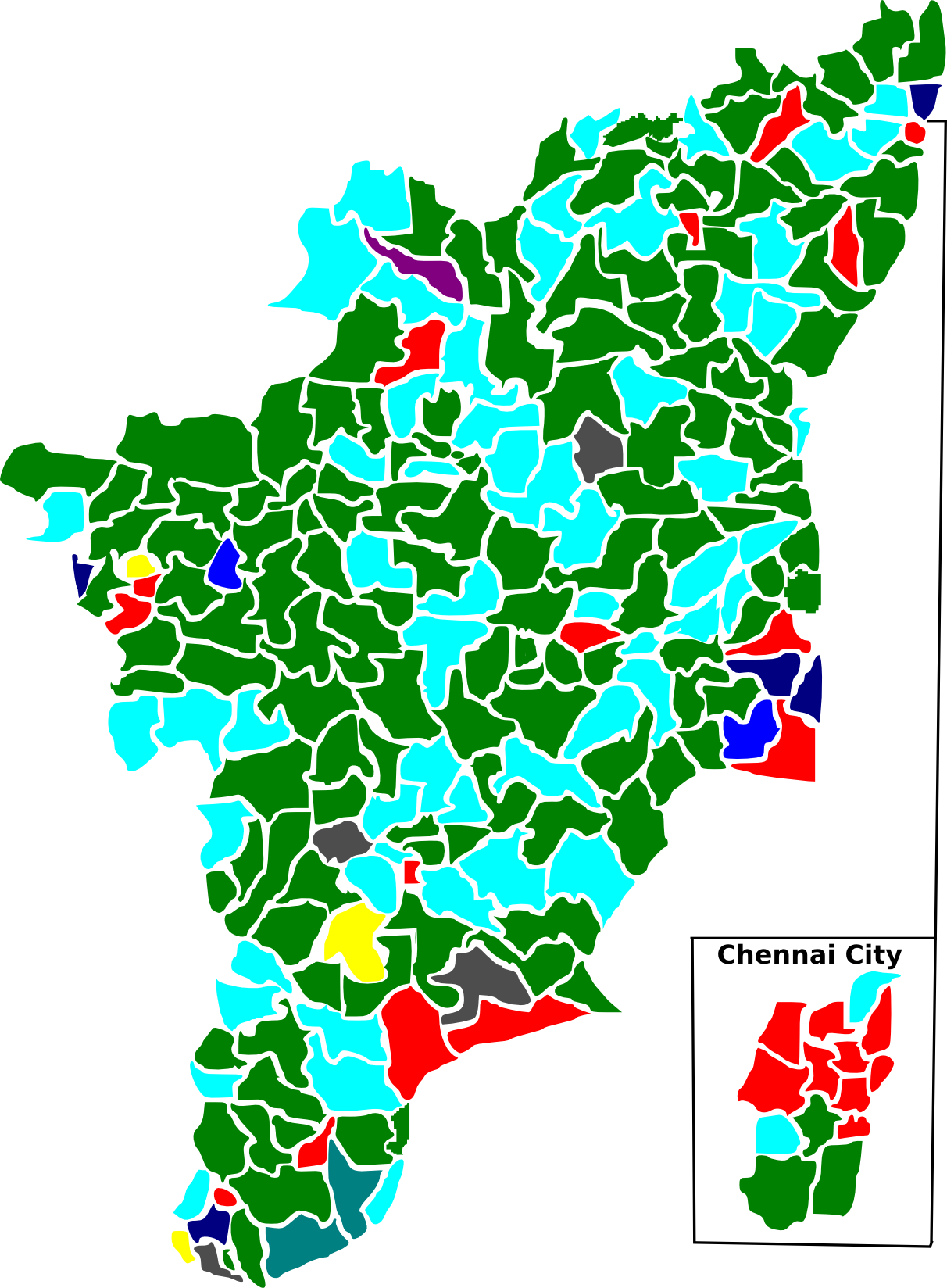
Election map of results based on parties. Colours are based on the results table on the left

Summary of the 1984 December Tamil Nadu legislative Assembly election results
Alliance/Party	Seats won	Change	Popular Vote	Vote %	Adj. %^{‡}
AIADMK+ alliance	195	+33	11,681,221	53.9%	
AIADMK	132	+3	8,030,809	37.0%	54.3%
INC(I)	61	+30	3,529,708	16.3%	54.5%
GKC	2	-4	120,704	0.6%	40.4%
DMK+ alliance	34	-25	8,021,293	37.0%	
DMK	24	-13	6,362,770	29.3%	40.8%
CPI(M)	5	-6	597,622	2.8%	39.6%
JNP	3	+1	493,374	2.3%	36.4%
CPI	2	-7	567,527	2.6%	35.5%
Others	5	-4	1,983,959	9.1%	
IND	4	-4	1,619,921	7.5%	7.9%
AKD	1	–	47,212	0.7%	57.2%
TNC	0	–	152,315	0.7%	34.9%
ICJ	0	–	110,121	0.5%	3.2%
BJP	0	–	54,390	0.3%	3.7%
Total	234	–	21,686,473	100%	–

‡: Vote % reflects the percentage of votes the party received compared to the entire electorate that voted in this election. Adjusted (Adj.) Vote %, reflects the % of votes the party received per constituency that they contested.
Sources: Election Commission of India

=== Results by district ===
District	Seats			
District	Seats	ADK+	DMK+	OTH
Chengalpattu	17	14	3	—N/a
Madras	14	5	9	—N/a
North Arcot	21	19	2	—N/a
South Arcot	21	20	—N/a	1
Dharmapuri	10	8	1	1
Salem	17	17	—N/a	—N/a
Coimbatore	17	12	5	—N/a
Erode	8	8	—N/a	—N/a
Nilgiris	3	3	—N/a	—N/a
Tiruchirapalli	18	17	1	—N/a
Thanjavur	20	15	5	—N/a
Pudukottai	5	5	—N/a	—N/a
Ramanathapuram	16	13	2	1
Madurai	22	20	1	1
Tirunelveli	18	16	2	—N/a
Kanyakumari	7	3	3	1
Total	234	195	34	5

=== By Region ===
Alliance-wise Results
Region	Total Seats	AIADMK-led Alliance	DMK-led Alliance
Northern Tamil Nadu	73	58 / 73 (79%)	14 / 73 (19%)
Western Tamil Nadu	55	48 / 55 (87%)	6 / 55 (11%)
Southern TamilNadu	63	52 / 63 (83%)	8 / 63 (13%)
Central TamilNadu	43	37 / 43 (86%)	6 / 43 (14%)

=== By constituency ===
Winner, runner-up, voter turnout, and victory margin in every constituency
District	Assembly Constituency		Winner				Runner Up				Margin
District	#k	Name	Candidate	Party	Votes	%	Candidate	Party	Votes	%	Margin
Madras	1	Royapuram	P. Punnurangam	DMK	40,727	50.26	K. Rajan	GKC	39,432	48.66	1,295
Madras	2	Harbour	A. Selvarasan	DMK	38,953	55.3	K. Liakath Ali Khan	AIADMK	30,649	43.51	8,304
Madras	3	Dr. Radhakrishnan Nagar	Venugopal S.	INC	54,334	50.71	S. P. Sarguna Pandian	DMK	50,483	47.12	3,851
Madras	4	Park Town	K. Anbazhagan	DMK	37,540	50.89	Jothi. M.	IND	34,613	46.92	2,927
Madras	5	Perambur	Parithi Ilamvazhuthi	DMK	53,325	53.04	Sathyavani Muthu	AIADMK	46,121	45.87	7,204
Madras	6	Purasawalkam	Nanjil K. Manoharan	DMK	61,246	51.14	Suppu. K.	AIADMK	56,736	47.37	4,510
Madras	7	Egmore	S. Balan	DMK	29,795	51.84	Sri Ramulu K. R.	INC	27,246	47.41	2,549
Madras	8	Anna Nagar	S. M. Ramachandran	DMK	63,854	52.59	Kothandaraman V.	AIADMK	56,128	46.22	7,726
Madras	9	Thiyagaraya Nagar	K. Sourirajan	INC	49,038	49.26	G. Kalivaradan	JP	40,154	40.34	8,884
Madras	10	Thousand Lights	K. A. Krishnaswamy	AIADMK	46,246	50.36	M. K. Stalin	DMK	43,954	47.86	2,292
Madras	11	Chepauk	A. Rahman Khan	DMK	36,234	56.26	Sri Ramulu K. R.	INC	27,246	47.41	8,988
Madras	12	Triplicane	Abdul Samad	DMK	36,410	50.52	K. S. G. Haja Shareef	INC	30,302	42.05	6,108
Madras	13	Mylapore	B. Valarmathi	AIADMK	51,870	51.68	Bharathi. R. S.	DMK	46,396	46.22	5,474
Madras	14	Saidapet	Saidai Duraisamy	AIADMK	52,869	49.35	Purushothaman. D.	DMK	52,679	49.17	190
Chengalpattu	15	Gummidipoondi	R. S. Munirathinam	AIADMK	55,221	55.56	K. Vezhavendan	DMK	43,174	43.44	12,047
Chengalpattu	16	Ponneri	K. P. K. Sekar Alias K. P. Kulasekaran	AIADMK	61,559	59.05	K. Sundaram	DMK	41,655	39.96	19,904
Chengalpattu	17	Thiruvottiyur	G. K. J. Baarathi	INC	65,194	54.26	T. K. Palaniswamy	DMK	53,684	44.68	11,510
Chengalpattu	18	Villivakkam	V. P. Chintan	CPI(M)	81,595	48.21	J. C. D. Prabhakar	AIADMK	80,549	47.59	1,046
Chengalpattu	19	Alandur	M. Abraham	DMK	61,300	49.14	Mohanarangam. R.	AIADMK	60,394	48.41	906
Chengalpattu	20	Tambaram	Ella Rajamanickam	AIADMK	75,155	51.75	M. A. Vaithyalingam	DMK	68,009	46.83	7,146
Chengalpattu	21	Thiruporur	Thamizhmani	AIADMK	38,075	47.28	Chokkalingam. G.	DMK	31,641	39.29	6,434
Chengalpattu	22	Chengalpattu	P. G. Anoor Jegadeesan	AIADMK	45,423	50.14	Rudrakotti. V.	DMK	44,203	48.8	1,220
Chengalpattu	23	Maduranthakam	C. Arumugam	DMK	40,105	46.21	Sachuthanandam	INC	37,745	43.49	2,360
Chengalpattu	24	Acharapakkam	K. Ethirajan	AIADMK	43,323	54.66	E. Ramakrishnan	DMK	34,744	43.83	8,579
Chengalpattu	25	Uthiramerur	Narasimma Pallavan. K.	AIADMK	57,797	57.21	Ponmozhi. C. V. M. A.	DMK	40,007	39.6	17,790
Chengalpattu	26	Kancheepuram	K. Balaji	AIADMK	60,363	55.31	Palani Raja Kumar. C. M.	DMK	47,362	43.4	13,001
Chengalpattu	27	Sriperumbudur	D. Yasodha	INC	46,421	53.94	Panchatcharam. K. M.	DMK	34,601	40.21	11,820
Chengalpattu	28	Poonamallee	G. Ananthakrishna	INC	55,129	55.97	D. Rajarathinam	DMK	40,562	41.18	14,567
Chengalpattu	29	Thiruvallur	S. Pattabiraman	AIADMK	44,461	51.73	S. R. Munirathinam	DMK	39,908	46.43	4,553
Chengalpattu	30	Tiruttani	R. Shanmugam	AIADMK	41,669	50.48	Chiranjeevulu Naidu. C.	JP	37,740	45.72	3,929
Chengalpattu	31	Pallipet	Narasimhan. P. N.	AIADMK	34,935	39.96	Bakambaram. A.	IND	28,724	32.85	6,211
North Arcot	32	Arakkonam	V. K. Raju	DMK	52,657	52.24	M. Vijayasarathy	AIADMK	46,344	45.98	6,313
North Arcot	33	Sholingur	N. Shanmugam	AIADMK	47,967	51.38	K. Moorthi	DMK	43,918	47.05	4,049
North Arcot	34	Ranipet	M. Kadirvelu	INC	56,068	55.6	Abdul Jabbar V. M.	DMK	33,337	33.06	22,731
North Arcot	35	Arcot	T. Palani	AIADMK	52,222	58.96	Arcot N. Veerasamy	DMK	34,509	38.96	17,713
North Arcot	36	Katpadi	G. Raghupathi	AIADMK	53,077	57.08	Durai Murugan	DMK	36,839	39.62	16,238
North Arcot	37	Gudiyatham	R. Govindasamy	INC	32,077	39.15	A. K. Sundararajan	IND	25,630	31.28	6,447
North Arcot	38	Pernambut	K. Thamizharasan	AIADMK	47,813	56.17	V. Govindan	DMK	36,420	42.78	11,393
North Arcot	39	Vaniyambadi	H. Abdul Majeed	INC	39,141	45.36	A. P. Abdul Majid	DMK	37,856	43.87	1,285
North Arcot	40	Natrampalli	T. Anbazhagan	AIADMK	56,503	58.55	N. K. Raja	DMK	27,293	28.28	29,210
North Arcot	41	Tirupattur (Vellore)	Shanmugam Y.	INC	46,884	49.02	B. Sundaram	DMK	28,781	30.09	18,103
North Arcot	42	Chengam	T. Swamikannu	AIADMK	45,770	61.42	P. Anbalagan	JP	21,039	28.23	24,731
North Arcot	43	Thandarambattu	E. Vachiravelu	AIADMK	53,422	58.96	D. Venugopal	DMK	34,649	38.24	18,773
North Arcot	44	Tiruvannamalai	A. S. Ravindran	INC	49,782	51.31	S. Murugaiyan	DMK	44,409	45.77	5,373
North Arcot	45	Kalasapakkam	Pandurangan. M.	AIADMK	54,969	58.78	P. S. Thiruvengadam	DMK	35,303	37.75	19,666
North Arcot	46	Polur	Rajababu. J.	INC	52,437	62.4	Subramantan. T. K.	DMK	30,319	36.08	22,118
North Arcot	47	Anaikattu	V. R. Krishnasamy	AIADMK	45,312	58.42	Rajagopal. P. N.	IND	26,692	34.42	18,620
North Arcot	48	Vellore	Devaraj. V. M.	DMK	54,453	54.01	A. K. Ranganathan	AIADMK	44,430	44.07	10,023
North Arcot	49	Arani	M. Chinnakulandai	AIADMK	54,653	54.83	R. Sivanandam	DMK	43,620	43.76	11,033
North Arcot	50	Cheyyar	K. Murugan	AIADMK	53,945	58.46	Babu Janarthanam	DMK	37,405	40.53	16,540
North Arcot	51	Vandavasi	A. Arumugham	INC	48,712	53.29	V. Rajagopal	DMK	38,326	41.93	10,386
North Arcot	52	Peranamallur	R. Hari Kumar	AIADMK	49,591	54.39	A. Rajendran	DMK	37,599	41.24	11,992
South Arcot	53	Melmalayanur	P. U. Shanmugam	AIADMK	61,289	67.63	P. R. Aranganathan	DMK	27,343	30.17	33,946
South Arcot	54	Gingee	Muruganandam. T. N.	INC	56,156	60.61	Ramachandran. N.	DMK	34,054	36.76	22,102
South Arcot	55	Tindivanam	K. M. Thangamani	INC	45,404	58.67	Subramanya Kounder	JP	26,088	33.71	19,316
South Arcot	56	Vanur	M. N. Ramajayam	AIADMK	58,196	64.54	A. Poopalan	DMK	31,980	35.46	26,216
South Arcot	57	Kandamangalam	V. Subramanian	AIADMK	53,211	58.01	Alaguvelu S.	DMK	38,514	41.99	14,697
South Arcot	58	Villupuram	Rajarathinam Mani M.	AIADMK	50,156	52.71	Palaniappan K. P.	DMK	36,302	38.15	13,854
South Arcot	59	Mugaiyur	Chandrasekar. M.	AIADMK	45,863	56.87	Sampath. A. G.	DMK	31,128	38.6	14,735
South Arcot	60	Thirunavalur	Menoharan T. N. G. A.	AIADMK	40,539	49.79	Balasubramanian A. V.	DMK	32,566	40	7,973
South Arcot	61	Ulundurpet	K. Murugesan Anandan	AIADMK	56,200	63.18	K. Varaharajulu	DMK	29,318	32.96	26,882
South Arcot	62	Nellikuppam	Anbarasan Alias Ramalingam	AIADMK	48,018	56.71	Govindarajan	CPI(M)	26,641	31.46	21,377
South Arcot	63	Cuddalore	V. G. Cheelappa	INC	53,759	58.02	V. Krishnamurthy	DMK	37,063	40	16,696
South Arcot	64	Panruti	S. Ramachandaran	AIADMK	51,900	53.97	K. Nandagopala Krishnan	DMK	44,263	46.03	7,637
South Arcot	65	Kurinjipadi	A. Thangarasu	AIADMK	45,400	49.9	C. Kuppusami	DMK	34,434	37.85	10,966
South Arcot	66	Bhuvanagiri	V. V. Swaminathan	AIADMK	51,922	56.2	Durai Krishnamoorthy	DMK	39,621	42.89	12,301
South Arcot	67	Kattumannarkoil	S. Jayachandran	INC	42,928	50.67	K. P. Thangaswamy	DMK	41,796	49.33	1,132
South Arcot	68	Chidambaram	K. R. Ganapathi	AIADMK	47,067	54.55	K. S. Subramanian	DMK	37,824	43.84	9,243
South Arcot	69	Vriddhachalam	R. Thiyagarajan	INC	53,731	57.33	D. Rasavelu	DMK	35,609	37.99	18,122
South Arcot	70	Mangalore	S. Thangaraju	AIADMK	55,408	61.4	N. Muthuvel	DMK	32,273	35.76	23,135
South Arcot	71	Rishivandiyam	S. Sivaraj	INC	43,439	51.95	M. Natesha Udayar	DMK	38,318	45.82	5,121
South Arcot	72	Chinnasalem	S. Sivaraman	IND	53,630	63.65	Periyasamy D.	DMK	30,633	36.35	22,997
South Arcot	73	Sankarapuram	S. Kalitheerthan	AIADMK	53,162	59.49	K. Venkatapathy	DMK	29,131	32.6	24,031
Dharmapuri	74	Hosur	T. Venkata Reddy	INC	35,293	48.37	E. Venkatasamy	JP	15,096	20.69	20,197
Dharmapuri	75	Thalli	K. V. Venugopal	INC	36,441	49.05	D. C. Vijayendraiah	JP	34,017	45.79	2,424
Dharmapuri	76	Kaveripattinam	K. Samarasam	AKD	47,212	57.18	V. C. Govindasamy Gounder	DMK	31,533	38.19	15,679
Dharmapuri	77	Krishnagiri	Chinnaraju K. R.	AIADMK	40,585	54.83	Kanchana	DMK	29,570	39.95	11,015
Dharmapuri	78	Bargur	T. M. Venkatachalam	AIADMK	57,388	69.71	Veeramani P. V.	DMK	24,577	29.86	32,811
Dharmapuri	79	Harur	R. Rajamanickam	AIADMK	60,106	66.96	Annamalai M.	CPI(M)	27,799	30.97	32,307
Dharmapuri	80	Morappur	Theerthagiri Gounder T.	INC	39,779	50.77	Samikannu V.	DMK	27,453	35.04	12,326
Dharmapuri	81	Palacode	Theertharaman P.	INC	55,459	65.93	Munusamigounder M. B.	DMK	26,045	30.96	29,414
Dharmapuri	82	Dharmapuri	R. Chinnasamy	DMK	46,383	54.21	Aranganathan S.	AIADMK	37,929	44.33	8,454
Dharmapuri	83	Pennagaram	H. G. Arumugam	AIADMK	44,616	54.98	Nanjappan N.	CPI	25,518	31.45	19,098
Salem	84	Mettur	Machimuthu K. P.	AIADMK	46,083	48.15	Gurusamy K.	IND	28,253	29.52	17,830
Salem	85	Taramangalam	S. Semmalai	AIADMK	63,407	69.68	Arjunan K.	DMK	25,429	27.95	37,978
Salem	86	Omalur	Anbalagan	INC	51,703	66.04	Kuppusamy S.	CPI	22,961	29.33	28,742
Salem	87	Yercaud	Thirugnanam P. R.	INC	48,787	74.4	Manickam. K	DMK	16,785	25.6	32,002
Salem	88	Salem-I	G. Krishnaraj	AIADMK	54,749	51.8	G. K. Subasu	DMK	48,863	46.24	5,886
Salem	89	Salem-Ii	Arumugam	AIADMK	49,339	53.79	Veerapandy S. Arumugam	DMK	41,333	45.07	8,006
Salem	90	Veerapandi	P. Vijayalakshmi	AIADMK	61,609	63.7	Subramaniams	DMK	33,549	34.69	28,060
Salem	91	Panamarathupatty	Rajaram K.	AIADMK	48,726	60.35	Sivalingam. S. R.	DMK	27,810	34.45	20,916
Salem	92	Attur	C. Palanimuthu	INC	55,927	66.53	A. M. Ramaswamy	DMK	24,804	29.51	31,123
Salem	93	Talavasal	T. Rajambal	INC	53,104	64.73	R. Ravichandar	DMK	25,291	30.83	27,813
Salem	94	Rasipuram	Ramalingam K. P.	AIADMK	51,565	52.45	Kaliappan. P.	DMK	41,087	41.79	10,478
Salem	95	Sendamangalam	S. Sivaprakasam	AIADMK	54,129	64.17	Kalavathi. S.	DMK	26,277	31.15	27,852
Salem	96	Namakkal	R. Arunachalam	AIADMK	58,158	56.93	K. Veluchami	DMK	40,868	40.01	17,290
Salem	97	Kapilamalai	P. Sengottaiyan	INC	51,233	53.52	K. A. Mani	IND	40,090	41.88	11,143
Salem	98	Tiruchengodu	Ponnaiyan C.	AIADMK	77,659	55.38	Kandasamy. M. M.	DMK	58,437	41.67	19,222
Salem	99	Sankari	P. Dhanapal	AIADMK	58,276	56.99	Murugesan. S.	DMK	41,906	40.98	16,370
Salem	100	Edapadi	Govindaswamy	INC	68,583	64.78	Arumugam. P.	DMK	27,860	26.32	40,723
Coimbatore	101	Mettupalayam	Chinnaraj. M.	AIADMK	61,951	59.6	Mathiyan. M.	DMK	41,527	39.95	20,424
Coimbatore	102	Avanashi	Lakshmi P.	AIADMK	58,677	67.3	Arumugam. M.	CPI	24,504	28.11	34,173
Coimbatore	103	Thondamuthur	Aranganayakam	AIADMK	67,679	57.48	Vellingiri. U. K.	CPI(M)	45,353	38.52	22,326
Coimbatore	104	Singanallur	Sengalippan R.	JP	54,787	49.37	Subramaniam. A.	INC	49,856	44.92	4,931
Coimbatore	105	Coimbatore (West)	M. Ramanathan	DMK	44,542	51.91	Hakkeem M. A.	INC	37,650	43.87	6,892
Coimbatore	106	Coimbatore (East)	K. Ramani	CPI(M)	40,891	48.14	Kovai Thambi	AIADMK	39,832	46.89	1,059
Coimbatore	107	Perur	A. Natarasan	DMK	58,302	52.63	K. Marudasalam	AIADMK	51,241	46.26	7,061
Coimbatore	108	Kinathukadavu	K. V. Kandaswamy	AIADMK	50,375	56.69	M. Kannappan	DMK	38,492	43.31	11,883
Coimbatore	109	Pollachi	M. V. Rathinam	AIADMK	54,337	52.6	S. Raju	DMK	47,527	46.01	6,810
Coimbatore	110	Valparai	V. Thangavelu	INC	48,779	63.46	A. T. Karuppiah	CPI	26,109	33.97	22,670
Coimbatore	111	Udumalaipettai	S. Thirumalaisamy Gounder	INC	56,004	53.3	R. T. Mariyappan	DMK	46,526	44.28	9,478
Coimbatore	112	Dharapuram	Periasamy. A.	AIADMK	51,919	59.09	Ayyasamy. R.	DMK	35,951	40.91	15,968
Coimbatore	113	Vellakoil	Durai Ramasamy	AIADMK	54,188	55.82	Appan Palanisamy	DMK	42,881	44.18	11,307
Coimbatore	114	Pongalur	Kandaswamy P.	AIADMK	46,535	57.77	Palanisamy N. S.	IND	30,934	38.4	15,601
Coimbatore	115	Palladam	P. N. Paramasiva Gounder	AIADMK	51,083	53.97	Sivasamy	IND	40,510	42.8	10,573
Coimbatore	116	Tiruppur	K. Subbarayan	CPI	51,874	40.92	Manimaran. R.	AIADMK	50,634	39.94	1,240
Coimbatore	117	Kangayam	K. C. Palanisamy	AIADMK	54,252	57.78	M. Sivasabapathy	DMK	37,495	39.94	16,757
Erode	118	Modakkurichi	S. Balakrishnan	AIADMK	65,641	56.56	A. Ganeshamurthy	DMK	48,315	41.63	17,326
Erode	119	Perundurai	A. Ponnusamy	AIADMK	60,830	64.34	T. K. Nallappan	CPI	32,465	34.34	28,365
Erode	120	Erode	S. Muthusamy	AIADMK	71,722	53.5	Subbulakshmi Jagadeesan	DMK	60,075	44.81	11,647
Erode	121	Bhavani	P. G. Narayanan	AIADMK	58,350	63.3	N. K. K. Periasamy	DMK	33,116	35.93	25,234
Erode	122	Anthiyur	U. P. Mathaiyan	AIADMK	53,825	69.75	Lakshmi S.	DMK	22,479	29.13	31,346
Erode	123	Gobichettipalayam	K. A. Sengottaiyan	AIADMK	56,884	63.08	Andamuthu M.	DMK	31,879	35.35	25,005
Erode	124	Bhavanisagar	V. K. Chinnasamy	AIADMK	52,539	59.06	Vellingiri S. Alias Giri S. V.	JP	35,743	40.18	16,796
Erode	125	Sathyamangalam	E. V. K. S. Elangovan	INC	50,725	62.97	Subramaniam T. K.	DMK	25,006	31.04	25,719
Nilgiris	126	Coonoor	M. Sivakumar	AIADMK	47,113	56.7	M. Ranganathan	DMK	34,990	42.11	12,123
Nilgiris	127	Udhagamandalam	K. Kallan	INC	52,145	62.99	Mahalingam S. A.	DMK	29,345	35.45	22,800
Nilgiris	128	Gudalur	K. Hutchi Gowder	AIADMK	52,470	57.8	K. Karuppusamy	DMK	36,013	39.67	16,457
Madurai	129	Palani	A. S. Ponnammal	INC	62,344	66.27	N. Palanivel	CPI(M)	30,794	32.73	31,550
Madurai	130	Oddanchatram	K. Kuppuswamy	AIADMK	46,466	49.86	Chellamuthu K.	IND	43,985	47.19	2,481
Madurai	131	Periyakulam	Mohammed Saleem T.	AIADMK	58,021	63.04	Maya Thevar Alias Mayan P. N.	DMK	31,554	34.28	26,467
Madurai	132	Theni	V. R. Jayaraman	AIADMK	56,970	57.36	K. T. K. Thangamani	CPI	40,611	40.89	16,359
Madurai	133	Bodinayakkanur	K. S. M. Ramachandran	INC	54,231	61	Muthu Manoharan	DMK	34,359	38.65	19,872
Madurai	134	Cumbum	S. Subburayar	AIADMK	52,228	52.17	N. Eramakrishnan	DMK	47,005	46.95	5,223
Madurai	135	Andipatti	M. G. Ramachandran	AIADMK	60,510	67.4	Thangaraj Alias Vallarasu	DMK	28,026	31.22	32,484
Madurai	136	Sedapatti	Sedapatti Muthiah	AIADMK	38,808	47.29	N. S. Selvaraj	INC	33,810	41.2	4,998
Madurai	137	Tirumangalam	N. S. V. Chitthan	INC	46,146	55.23	A. Athiyanan	DMK	35,304	42.26	10,842
Madurai	138	Usilampatti	Muthuramalingam. P. K. M.	IND	50,876	60.9	Andi Thever S.	IND	30,135	36.07	20,741
Madurai	139	Nilakottai	A. Baluchamy	AIADMK	55,162	62.88	M. Arivazhagan	DMK	25,313	28.86	29,849
Madurai	140	Sholavandan	Chandrasekaran A.	INC	44,464	53.35	Rajagopal. P. N.	IND	26,692	34.42	17,772
Madurai	141	Thiruparankundram	M. Marimuthu	AIADMK	58,559	53.47	Ayyanan Ambalam	DMK	45,886	41.9	12,673
Madurai	142	Madurai West	Pon. Muthuramalingam	DMK	48,247	51.24	Pandian S.	AIADMK	45,131	47.93	3,116
Madurai	143	Madurai Central	Deivanyagam A.	INC	41,272	50.76	Nedumaran P.	TNC(K)	39,012	47.98	2,260
Madurai	144	Madurai East	K. Kalimuthu	AIADMK	43,210	51.08	P. M. Kumar	CPI(M)	36,972	43.71	6,238
Madurai	145	Samayanallur	Sivakumar. A.	AIADMK	65,883	58.44	Selvaraj. S.	DMK	45,746	40.58	20,137
Madurai	146	Melur	Veeranambalam. D. V.	INC	60,794	60.11	Thiyagarajan. K.	AIADMK	33,748	33.37	27,046
Madurai	147	Natham	M. Andi Ambalam	INC	57,214	68.48	Alagirisamy. T.	TNC(K)	18,004	21.55	39,210
Madurai	148	Dindigul	A. Premkumar	AIADMK	67,718	62.68	N. Varadarajan	CPI	34,952	32.35	32,766
Madurai	149	Athoor	V.R. Nedunchezhiyan	AIADMK	67,178	63.16	Rajambal K.	DMK	37,605	35.35	29,573
Madurai	150	Vedasandur	V. P. Balasubramanian	AIADMK	60,583	55.48	P. Muthusamy	IND	32,714	29.96	27,869
Tiruchirapalli	151	Aravakurichi	S. Jegatheesan	AIADMK	57,887	55.72	P. Ramasamy	DMK	44,273	42.62	13,614
Tiruchirapalli	152	Karur	K. Vadivel	AIADMK	65,363	54.35	K. V. Ramasamy	DMK	53,160	44.2	12,203
Tiruchirapalli	153	Krishnarayapuram	P. M. Thangavelraj	INC	65,928	70.4	Krishnan. K.	DMK	25,613	27.35	40,315
Tiruchirapalli	154	Marungapuri	K. Sholairaj	AIADMK	62,656	69.36	P. Ramasamy	IND	24,135	26.72	38,521
Tiruchirapalli	155	Kulithalai	P. Musiri Puppnan	AIADMK	62,165	64.05	B. Karuppaiah	CPI	32,317	33.3	29,848
Tiruchirapalli	156	Thottiam	Periyasamy	INC	66,131	68.39	Vadivel S. R.	DMK	26,615	27.52	39,516
Tiruchirapalli	157	Uppiliapuram	R. Saroja	AIADMK	59,347	60.61	R. Mookkayee	DMK	37,249	38.04	22,098
Tiruchirapalli	158	Musiri	Rathinavelu. S.	AIADMK	65,759	59.75	Natarajan. R.	DMK	42,086	38.24	23,673
Tiruchirapalli	159	Lalgudi	K. Venkatachalam	INC	61,590	60.09	A. Swaminkan	TNC(K)	36,468	35.58	25,122
Tiruchirapalli	160	Perambalur	K. Nallamuthu	INC	57,021	63.88	T. Sarojini	DMK	27,751	31.09	29,270
Tiruchirapalli	161	Varahur	A. Arunachalam	AIADMK	50,012	56.92	K. Kanaga Sabai	DMK	37,302	42.45	12,710
Tiruchirapalli	162	Ariyalur	S. Purushothaman	AIADMK	56,815	58.36	T. Arumugam	DMK	39,045	40.11	17,770
Tiruchirapalli	163	Andimadam	Adhimoolam Alias Gandhi	AIADMK	43,911	52.92	S. Sivasubramanian	DMK	37,895	45.67	6,016
Tiruchirapalli	164	Jayankondam	Masilamani. N.	INC	57,468	62.94	J. Pannirselvam	JP	22,778	24.95	34,690
Tiruchirapalli	165	Srirangam	R. Soudararajan	AIADMK	58,861	56.52	C. Ramasamy Udayar	JP	38,399	36.87	20,462
Tiruchirapalli	166	Tiruchirappalli I	A. Malarmannan	DMK	37,802	50.84	Perumal. R.	INC	34,909	46.95	2,893
Tiruchirapalli	167	Tiruchirappalli Ii	N. Nallusamy	AIADMK	46,589	51.63	Anbil P. Dharmalingam	DMK	41,908	46.44	4,681
Tiruchirapalli	168	Thiruverumbur	M. Guruswamy Alias Annadasan	AIADMK	47,900	47.84	Pappa Umanath	CPI(M)	43,421	43.36	4,479
Thanjavur	169	Sirkazhi	K. Balasubramanian	AIADMK	51,438	55.65	M. Panneerselvam	DMK	40,152	43.44	11,286
Thanjavur	170	Poompuhar	Vijayabalan. N.	AIADMK	44,860	50.22	Jama Imoideen Papa	DMK	41,780	46.77	3,080
Thanjavur	171	Mayiladuthurai	M. Thangamani	AIADMK	47,119	51.87	K. Satiyaseelan	DMK	42,948	47.28	4,171
Thanjavur	172	Kuttalam	Pappa Subbramanian	AIADMK	53,214	55.63	Rajamanickam. R.	DMK	41,454	43.33	11,760
Thanjavur	173	Nannilam	M. Manimaran	DMK	50,072	51.72	Anbarasan. S.	AIADMK	45,564	47.06	4,508
Thanjavur	174	Thiruvarur	M. Sellamuthu	CPI(M)	56,273	55.99	P. Selvadurai	INC	44,227	44.01	12,046
Thanjavur	175	Nagapattinam	G. Veeraiyan	CPI(M)	43,684	48.24	S. Thenkovan	AIADMK	38,698	42.74	4,986
Thanjavur	176	Vedaranyam	M. Meenakshi Sundaram	DMK	49,922	50.23	Rajendran. P. V.	INC	48,646	48.94	1,276
Thanjavur	177	Thiruthuraipoondi	P. Uthirapathy	CPI	59,834	54.44	J. Archunan	AIADMK	49,019	44.6	10,815
Thanjavur	178	Mannargudi	S. Gnanasundaram	AIADMK	49,471	47.96	P. Ramalingam	CPI	45,044	43.67	4,427
Thanjavur	179	Pattukkottai	Ramachandran P. N.	AIADMK	50,493	51.04	Subramanian. A. V.	DMK	35,376	35.76	15,117
Thanjavur	180	Peravurani	Govendhan. M. R.	AIADMK	52,690	55.46	Gopu. A. M.	CPI	25,423	26.76	27,267
Thanjavur	181	Orathanadu	T. Veeraswamy	AIADMK	46,717	46.28	L. Ganesan	DMK	42,648	42.24	4,069
Thanjavur	182	Thiruvonam	Sivagnanam. V.	INC	46,777	48.25	M. Ramachandran	DMK	35,707	36.83	11,070
Thanjavur	183	Thanjavur	Durai Krishnamurthy	INC	48,065	49.9	Thangamuthu. P. S.	DMK	46,304	48.08	1,761
Thanjavur	184	Thiruvaiyaru	Durai Govindarajan	AIADMK	46,974	55.75	Ramamurthy A.	TNC(K)	33,885	40.21	13,089
Thanjavur	185	Papanasam	S. Rajaraman	INC	52,202	58.52	Sachidhanandam. S.	DMK	34,924	39.15	17,278
Thanjavur	186	Valangiman	Gomathi Srinivasan	AIADMK	46,618	55.78	Somasundaram Sithmalli. N.	DMK	34,347	41.1	12,271
Thanjavur	187	Kumbakonam	K. Krishnamurthy	INC	58,334	64.57	Kaliyanasudaram. S.	DMK	20,666	22.88	37,668
Thanjavur	188	Thiruvidaimarudur	Rajangam. M	INC	50,002	51.18	Ramalingam. S.	DMK	36,539	37.4	13,463
Pudukottai	189	Thirumayam	Pushparaju T.	INC	65,043	69.42	Pawanan. R.	DMK	26,360	28.13	38,683
Pudukottai	190	Kolathur	Marimuthu. T.	AIADMK	62,391	62.72	Tamilselvan Keerai. A.	DMK	34,544	34.73	27,847
Pudukottai	191	Pudukkottai	J. Mohamed Gani	INC	63,877	62.37	K. R. Subbiah	CPI	26,214	25.6	37,663
Pudukottai	192	Alangudi	A. Venkatachalam	AIADMK	74,202	65.86	A. Periyannan	DMK	37,173	32.99	37,029
Pudukottai	193	Aranthangi	S. Thirunavukkarasu	AIADMK	70,101	62.68	Ramanathan. S.	DMK	40,197	35.94	29,904
Ramanathapuram	194	Tiruppattur (Sivaganga)	S. Madhavan	AIADMK	51,581	59.99	Algu. Pr.	DMK	29,673	34.51	21,908
Ramanathapuram	195	Karaikudi	S. P. Durairasu	AIADMK	47,760	48.98	C. T. Chidambaram	DMK	38,101	39.08	9,659
Ramanathapuram	196	Tiruvadanai	Sornalingam. K.	INC	47,618	47.8	Gnanaprakasam. M.	IND	28,801	28.91	18,817
Ramanathapuram	197	Ilayangudi	Anbalangan. P.	AIADMK	40,974	48.64	Malaikannan. V.	DMK	36,771	43.65	4,203
Ramanathapuram	198	Sivaganga	O. Subramanian	INC	49,407	55.92	Ayyadurai. V. R.	CPI	25,582	28.95	23,825
Ramanathapuram	199	Manamadurai	K. Paramalai	INC	52,587	61.67	V. Gopal	TNC(K)	24,946	29.25	27,641
Ramanathapuram	200	Paramakudi	K. Baluchamy	AIADMK	54,401	58.19	T. K. Siraimeettan	DMK	37,480	40.09	16,921
Ramanathapuram	201	Ramanathapuram	T. Ramasamy	AIADMK	56,342	59.91	M. S. Abdul Raheem	DMK	35,615	37.87	20,727
Ramanathapuram	202	Kadaladi	A. Piranavanathan	DMK	37,399	39.81	V. Sivathavilli Thevar	IND	30,697	32.67	6,702
Ramanathapuram	203	Mudukulathur	K. Muthuvel	IND	32,199	37.33	Kadher Batcha Alias S. Vellaichamy	DMK	23,611	27.38	8,588
Ramanathapuram	204	Aruppukottai	M. Pitchai	AIADMK	39,839	45.32	V. Thangapandian	DMK	36,405	41.42	3,434
Ramanathapuram	205	Sattur	K. K. S. S. R. Ramachandran	AIADMK	58,745	51.03	S. S. Karuppasamy	DMK	51,338	44.6	7,407
Ramanathapuram	206	Virudhunagar	A. S. A. Arumugam	JP	42,852	45.36	M. Sundararajan	AIADMK	35,776	37.87	7,076
Ramanathapuram	207	Sivakasi	V. Balakrishnan	AIADMK	41,731	38.73	Perumal Samy. N.	IND	30,930	28.71	10,801
Ramanathapuram	208	Srivilliputhur	R. Thamaraikani	AIADMK	54,458	53.35	Senivasan. P.	DMK	46,245	45.31	8,213
Ramanathapuram	209	Rajapalayam	K. Raman	INC	54,670	54.49	Paulraj-I	CPI	44,924	44.78	9,746
Tirunelveli	210	Vilathikulam	S. Kumara Kurubara Ramanathan	DMK	32,481	40.52	R. K. Perumal	AIADMK	26,143	32.62	6,338
Tirunelveli	211	Ottapidaram	R. S. Arumugam	INC	46,190	67.89	M. Appadurai	CPI	20,868	30.67	25,322
Tirunelveli	212	Kovilpatti	R. Rangasamy	INC	45,623	55.75	S. Alagarsamy	CPI	28,327	34.61	17,296
Tirunelveli	213	Sankarankoil	S. Sankaralingam	AIADMK	48,411	54.45	S. Thangavelu	DMK	36,028	40.52	12,383
Tirunelveli	214	Vasudevanallur	R. Eswaran	INC	50,303	62.34	Periasamy. M. S.	CPI(M)	27,875	34.55	22,428
Tirunelveli	215	Kadayanallur	T. Perumal	AIADMK	49,186	53.44	Samusudeen Alias Kathiravan	DMK	41,584	45.18	7,602
Tirunelveli	216	Tenkasi	T. R. Venkataraman	INC	57,011	60.45	M. Kuthalingam	DMK	35,383	37.52	21,628
Tirunelveli	217	Alangulam	N. Shanmugiah Pandian	AIADMK	48,109	54.49	Thambi Thurai. P.	DMK	27,076	30.67	21,033
Tirunelveli	218	Tirunelveli	S. Narayanan	AIADMK	56,409	59.57	A. L. Subramanian	DMK	37,547	39.65	18,862
Tirunelveli	219	Palayamkottai	V. S. T. Shamsulalam	DMK	45,209	51.92	V. Karuppasamy Pandian	AIADMK	41,004	47.09	4,205
Tirunelveli	220	Cheranmahadevi	P. H. Pandian	AIADMK	55,898	67.45	Pandian. P. S.	DMK	26,225	31.64	29,673
Tirunelveli	221	Ambasamudram	Balasubramanian	AIADMK	44,707	54.75	Nallasivan A.	CPI(M)	36,041	44.14	8,666
Tirunelveli	222	Nanguneri	M. John Vincent	AIADMK	45,825	58	Namdi. E.	DMK	31,807	40.25	14,018
Tirunelveli	223	Radhapuram	Kumari Ananthan	GKC	40,213	53.99	Subramania Nadar. B.	IND	25,075	33.66	15,138
Tirunelveli	224	Sattangulam	S. N. Ramasamy	GKC	37,892	53.69	Ganesapandian. M. A.	JP	29,275	41.48	8,617
Tirunelveli	225	Tiruchendur	S. R. Subramania Adityan	AIADMK	45,953	50.7	K. P. Kandasamy	DMK	43,565	48.07	2,388
Tirunelveli	226	Srivaikuntam	S. Daniel Raj	INC	41,513	53.76	S. P. Muthu	DMK	34,140	44.21	7,373
Tirunelveli	227	Thoothukkudi	S. N. Rajendran	AIADMK	59,622	56.54	A. Ayyasamy	DMK	37,549	35.61	22,073
Kanyakumari	228	Kanniyakumari	K. Perumal Pillai	AIADMK	45,353	54.05	Sankaraligom. M.	DMK	37,696	44.92	7,657
Kanyakumari	229	Nagercoil	S. Retnaraj	DMK	41,572	47.86	Jagatheeson. S.	AIADMK	40,301	46.39	1,271
Kanyakumari	230	Colachel	F. M. Rajarathnam	AIADMK	33,585	39.33	M. R. Gandhi	BJP	32,996	38.64	589
Kanyakumari	231	Padmanabhapuram	V. Balachandran	IND	28,465	37.77	M. Vincent	AIADMK	24,148	32.05	4,317
Kanyakumari	232	Thiruvattar	J. Hemachandran	CPI(M)	26,851	36.97	M. Mohndahs	IND	22,762	31.34	4,089
Kanyakumari	233	Vilavancode	M. Sundardas	INC	47,169	57.49	D. Moni	CPI(M)	34,876	42.51	12,293
Kanyakumari	234	Killiyoor	D. Kumaradas	JP	36,944	58.24	Pauliah. A.	INC	25,458	40.14	11,486

== Third Ramachandran cabinet ==
After the General Elections held in December 1984, the Governor appointed Dr. M. G. Ramachandran as Chief Minister heading the new Government with effect from the forenoon of 10 February 1985. The Governor, on the advice of Hon. Chief Minister appointed 16 more Ministers on 14 February 1985.

== Janaki's cabinet ==
S.no	Name	Designation	Party
Chief Minister
1.	V. N. Janaki	Chief Minister	AIADMK
Cabinet Ministers
2.	R. M. Veerappan	Minister for Local Administration	AIADMK
3.	P. U. Shanmugam	Minister for Health	AIADMK
4.	C. Ponnaiyan	Minister for Education and Law	AIADMK
5.	S. Muthusamy	Minister for Transport	AIADMK
6.	V. V. Swaminathan	Minister for Tourism, Prohibition and Electricity	AIADMK
7.	T. Ramasamy	Minister for Commercial Taxes	AIADMK
8.	A. Arunachalam	Minister for Adi Dravidar Welfare	AIADMK

After MGR's death, VR Neduncheziyan was sworn in as Acting Chief Minister. But, one week later, the party majority led by R.M.Veerappan supported MGR's widow Janaki to become Chief minister and she was sworn in as Chief minister. Janaki doubled as the finance minister in her Cabinet. The Governor gave V. N. Janaki Ramachandran 30 days time to prove majority support in the house. This was a problem because, 30 MLAs of her own party were supporting J. Jayalalithaa to become the new Chief minister. Hence Janaki had the support of only 105 MLAs in the house of 234, as VR Neduncheziyan's 10 supporters chose to remain neutral and boycott the voting.

Hence, on the day of voting, Speaker PH pandiyan disqualified and dismissed 20 MLAs of opposition party DMK and 15 MLAs of AIADMK (Jayalalithaa faction ) from their MLA posts, due to demeaning behaviour in the house and thus announced that the majority was reduced to a mere 100, as the house then had only 199 members.

Before commencement of oral voting, violence erupted in the house and the speaker was injured. With bleeding head, he announced that Janaki had proved her majority with 105 MLAs and adjourned the house immediately. Then the members of the assembly were escorted out.

The Governor of state refused to accept this voting which was done under suspicious environment and recommended the Central government to dismiss the legislature and hold fresh general elections. The central government accepted the recommendation and the legislature was dissolved by the President.

== See also ==
- Elections in Tamil Nadu
- Legislature of Tamil Nadu
- Government of Tamil Nadu
