= Velappan =

Velappan is a surname. Notable people with the surname include:

- C. V. Velappan, Indian politician
- Peter Velappan (1935–2018), Malaysian football executive
