= Bhaktavatsala Perumal Temple =

Bhaktavatsala Perumal temple may refer to these Vishnu temples in Tamil, Nadu, India:

- Bhaktavatsala Perumal temple, Thirunindravur, Chennai
- Bhaktavatsala Perumal temple, Tirukannamangai, Tiruvarur

== See also ==
- M. Bhaktavatsalam, Indian politician
  - Bhaktavatsalam Vidyashram, school in Chennai, India
- Bhaktavatsalu Naidu, Indian politician
