= Arakkonam Assembly constituency =

State Legislative Assembly Constituency in Tamil Nadu

Coordinates: 13°04′40″N 79°40′00″E

Arakkonam
- Constituency No. 38 for the Tamil Nadu Legislative Assembly

Constituency details
- Country: India
- Region: South India
- State: Tamil Nadu
- District: Ranipet
- Lok Sabha constituency: Arakkonam
- Established: 1951
- Total electors: 2,00,986
- Reservation: SC

Member of Legislative Assembly
- 17th Tamil Nadu Legislative Assembly
- Incumbent V. Gandhiraj
- Party: TVK
- Alliance: TVK+
- Elected year: 2026

Arakkonam (also known as Arkonam) is a state assembly constituency in the Indian state of Tamil Nadu. Its State Assembly Constituency number is 38. It includes the city of Arakkonam in Ranipettai district and is reserved for candidates from the Scheduled Castes. It is part of Arakkonam Lok Sabha constituency for national elections to the Parliament of India. It is one of the 234 State Legislative Assembly Constituencies in Tamil Nadu in India.

== Members of the Legislative Assembly ==
| Election | Member | Party |
|---|---|---|
| 1952 | Bhaktavatsalu Naidu | Independent politician |
| 1957 | S. C. Sadayappa Mudaliar | Indian National Congress |
| 1962 | S. J. Ramaswamy Mudali | Dravida Munnetra Kazhagam |
| 1967 | S. J. Ramaswamy Mudali | Dravida Munnetra Kazhagam |
| 1971 | N. S. Balaraman | Dravida Munnetra Kazhagam |
| 1977 | V. K. Raju | All India Anna Dravida Munnetra Kazhagam |
| 1980 | M. Vijayasarathy | All India Anna Dravida Munnetra Kazhagam |
| 1984 | V. K. Raju | Dravida Munnetra Kazhagam |
| 1989 | V. K. Raju | Dravida Munnetra Kazhagam |
| 1991 | Lata Priyakumar | Indian National Congress |
| 1996 | R. Thamizh Chelvan | Dravida Munnetra Kazhagam |
| 2001 | K. Bhavani Karunakaran | All India Anna Dravida Munnetra Kazhagam |
| 2006 | M. Jaganmoorthy | Dravida Munnetra Kazhagam |
| 2011 | S. Ravi | All India Anna Dravida Munnetra Kazhagam |
| 2016 | S. Ravi | All India Anna Dravida Munnetra Kazhagam |
| 2021 | S. Ravi | All India Anna Dravida Munnetra Kazhagam |
| 2026 | V. Gandhiraj | Tamilaga Vettri Kazhagam |

Madras State

== Election results ==
Vote share of winning candidates
| 2026 | 40.46% |
| 2021 | 50.31% |
| 2016 | 41.21% |
| 2011 | 55.94% |
| 2006 | 47.17% |
| 2001 | 55.09% |
| 1996 | 58.13% |
| 1991 | 55.24% |
| 1989 | 46.78% |
| 1984 | 52.24% |
| 1980 | 48.84% |
| 1977 | 33.50% |
| 1971 | 60.11% |
| 1967 | 52.78% |
| 1962 | 38.98% |
| 1957 | 62.46% |
| 1952 | 45.98% |

=== Assembly election 2026 ===
2026 Tamil Nadu Legislative Assembly election : Arakkonam
| Party | Candidate | Votes | % | ±% |
|---|---|---|---|---|
| TVK | V. Gandhiraj | 73,776 | 40.46% | New |
| VCK | Ezhil Caroline | 50,655 | 27.78% | ▼6.52 |
| AIADMK | S. Ravi | 50,052 | 27.45% | New |
| NTK | K. Rajkumar | 5,191 | 2.85% | ▼5.77 |
| NOTA | None of the above | 899 | 0.49% | ▼0.49 |
| Margin of victory | | 23,121 | 12.68% | ▼3.32 |
| Turnout | | 182,493 | 90.80% | ▲15.39 |
| Total valid votes | | 182,340 | | |
| Registered electors | | 200,986 | | ▼11.58 |
| TVK gain from AIADMK | | Swing | ▼9.85 | |

=== Assembly election 2021 ===
2021 Tamil Nadu Legislative Assembly election : Arakkonam
| Party | Candidate | Votes | % | ±% |
|---|---|---|---|---|
| AIADMK | S. Ravi | 85,399 | 50.31% | ▲9.10 |
| VCK | J. Gowthama Sannah | 58,230 | 34.30% | ▲31.15 |
| NTK | E. Abirami | 14,631 | 8.62% | ▲7.99 |
| AMMK | K. C. Manivannan | 4,777 | 2.81% | New |
| MNM | S. Baskaran | 3,543 | 2.09% | New |
| BSP | P. Sudhakar | 1,825 | 1.08% | ▲0.09 |
| NOTA | None of the above | 1,656 | 0.98% | ▼0.26 |
| Margin of victory | | 27,169 | 16.00% | ▲13.48 |
| Turnout | | 171,417 | 75.41% | ▲0.08 |
| Total valid votes | | 169,756 | | |
| Rejected ballots | | 5 | 0.00% | |
| Registered electors | | 227,320 | | ▲3.51 |
| AIADMK hold | | Swing | | |

=== Assembly election 2016 ===
2016 Tamil Nadu Legislative Assembly election : Arakkonam
| Party | Candidate | Votes | % | ±% |
|---|---|---|---|---|
| AIADMK | S. Ravi | 68,176 | 41.21% | ▼14.73 |
| DMK | N. Rajkumar | 64,015 | 38.69% | New |
| PMK | R. Arpudham | 20,130 | 12.17% | New |
| VCK | G. Gopinath | 5,213 | 3.15% | ▼34.31 |
| NOTA | None of the above | 2,049 | 1.24% | New |
| BJP | C. Vijayan | 2,021 | 1.22% | New |
| BSP | P. Sudhakar | 1,641 | 0.99% | ▼0.44 |
| NTK | M. Saravanan | 1,038 | 0.63% | New |
| Margin of victory | | 4,161 | 2.52% | ▼15.96 |
| Turnout | | 165,445 | 75.33% | ▼3.55 |
| Total valid votes | | 165,441 | | |
| Rejected ballots | | 4 | 0.00% | ▼0.05 |
| Registered electors | | 219,621 | | ▲21.98 |
| AIADMK hold | | Swing | | |

=== Assembly election 2011 ===
2011 Tamil Nadu Legislative Assembly election : Arakkonam
| Party | Candidate | Votes | % | ±% |
|---|---|---|---|---|
| AIADMK | S. Ravi | 79,409 | 55.94% | ▲14.15 |
| VCK | S. Sellapandian | 53,172 | 37.46% | New |
| Puratchi Bharatham | G. Mahalingam | 3,007 | 2.12% | New |
| BSP | P. Sudhakar | 2,030 | 1.43% | New |
| IJK | S. Sendilkumar | 1,755 | 1.24% | New |
| Akhila India Jananayaka Makkal Katchi (Dr. Issac) | W. Titus Thiyagarajan | 1,483 | 1.04% | New |
| Independent | D. Ravi | 1,103 | 0.78% | |
| Margin of victory | | 26,237 | 18.48% | ▲13.11 |
| Turnout | | 142,028 | 78.88% | ▲4.90 |
| Total valid votes | | 141,959 | | |
| Rejected ballots | | 69 | 0.05% | ▲0.05 |
| Registered electors | | 180,053 | | ▼5.39 |
| AIADMK gain from DMK | | Swing | ▲8.77 | |

=== Assembly election 2006 ===
2006 Tamil Nadu Legislative Assembly election : Arakkonam
| Party | Candidate | Votes | % | ±% |
|---|---|---|---|---|
| DMK | M. Jaganmoorthy | 66,338 | 47.17% | ▲8.73 |
| AIADMK | S. Ravi | 58,782 | 41.79% | New |
| DMDK | R. Usha Rani | 9,185 | 6.53% | New |
| Independent | V. Ravi | 2,092 | 1.49% | |
| BJP | C. Vijayan | 1,561 | 1.11% | New |
| SP | M. Amutha | 1,143 | 0.81% | New |
| Margin of victory | | 7,556 | 5.37% | ▼11.28 |
| Turnout | | 140,786 | 73.98% | ▲10.44 |
| Total valid votes | | 140,646 | | |
| Registered electors | | 190,314 | | ▼0.63 |
| DMK gain from AIADMK | | Swing | ▼7.92 | |

=== Assembly election 2001 ===
2001 Tamil Nadu Legislative Assembly election : Arakkonam
| Party | Candidate | Votes | % | ±% |
|---|---|---|---|---|
| AIADMK | K. Bhavani Karunakaran | 67,034 | 55.09% | New |
| DMK | R. Ravishankar | 46,778 | 38.44% | ▼19.69 |
| MDMK | Ramani Perumal | 3,530 | 2.90% | ▲0.31 |
| Independent | E. Vasu | 1,729 | 1.42% | |
| RPI | S. Arunkumar | 1,634 | 1.34% | New |
| Puratchi Bharatham | Ravikumar. P | 985 | 0.81% | New |
| Margin of victory | | 20,256 | 16.65% | ▼21.92 |
| Turnout | | 121,695 | 63.54% | ▼6.65 |
| Total valid votes | | 121,690 | | |
| Registered electors | | 191,523 | | ▲4.85 |
| AIADMK gain from DMK | | Swing | ▼3.04 | |

=== Assembly election 1996 ===
1996 Tamil Nadu Legislative Assembly election : Arakkonam
| Party | Candidate | Votes | % | ±% |
|---|---|---|---|---|
| DMK | R. Thamizh Chelvan | 70,550 | 58.13% | ▲30.80 |
| PMK | R. Elumalai | 23,730 | 19.55% | ▲2.94 |
| INC | D. Yasodha | 22,802 | 18.79% | ▼36.45 |
| MDMK | A. Kesavan | 3,147 | 2.59% | New |
| Margin of victory | | 46,820 | 38.57% | ▲10.66 |
| Turnout | | 128,223 | 70.19% | ▲3.54 |
| Total valid votes | | 121,374 | | |
| Rejected ballots | | 6,884 | 5.37% | ▲2.78 |
| Registered electors | | 182,670 | | ▲6.85 |
| DMK gain from INC | | Swing | ▲2.89 | |

=== Assembly election 1991 ===
1991 Tamil Nadu Legislative Assembly election : Arakkonam
| Party | Candidate | Votes | % | ±% |
|---|---|---|---|---|
| INC | Lata Priyakumar | 61,314 | 55.24% | ▲32.64 |
| DMK | G. Mani | 30,332 | 27.33% | ▼19.45 |
| PMK | Ezhilarasu | 18,433 | 16.61% | New |
| Margin of victory | | 30,982 | 27.91% | ▲3.73 |
| Turnout | | 113,940 | 66.65% | ▲6.42 |
| Total valid votes | | 110,992 | | |
| Rejected ballots | | 2,948 | 2.59% | ▲0.51 |
| Registered electors | | 170,964 | | ▲10.97 |
| INC gain from DMK | | Swing | ▲8.46 | |

=== Assembly election 1989 ===
1989 Tamil Nadu Legislative Assembly election : Arakkonam
| Party | Candidate | Votes | % | ±% |
|---|---|---|---|---|
| DMK | V. K. Raju | 42,511 | 46.78% | ▼5.46 |
| INC | P. Rajakumar | 20,538 | 22.60% | New |
| Independent | M. Varadarajan | 18,653 | 20.53% | |
| AIADMK | K. Rajendran | 7,602 | 8.37% | New |
| Independent | K. Pattabi Aravindan | 667 | 0.73% | |
| Independent | P. Mani | 625 | 0.69% | |
| Margin of victory | | 21,973 | 24.18% | ▲17.92 |
| Turnout | | 92,795 | 60.23% | ▼17.83 |
| Total valid votes | | 90,869 | | |
| Rejected ballots | | 1,926 | 2.08% | ▼2.04 |
| Registered electors | | 154,062 | | ▲14.39 |
| DMK hold | | Swing | | |

=== Assembly election 1984 ===
1984 Tamil Nadu Legislative Assembly election : Arakkonam
| Party | Candidate | Votes | % | ±% |
|---|---|---|---|---|
| DMK | V. K. Raju | 52,657 | 52.24% | New |
| AIADMK | M. Vijayasarathy | 46,344 | 45.98% | ▼2.86 |
| Independent | G. B. Govindan | 770 | 0.76% | |
| Independent | M. Varadarajan | 685 | 0.68% | |
| Margin of victory | | 6,313 | 6.26% | ▲5.02 |
| Turnout | | 105,130 | 78.06% | ▲17.57 |
| Total valid votes | | 100,802 | | |
| Rejected ballots | | 4,328 | 4.12% | ▲2.93 |
| Registered electors | | 134,680 | | ▲8.26 |
| DMK gain from AIADMK | | Swing | ▲3.40 | |

=== Assembly election 1980 ===
1980 Tamil Nadu Legislative Assembly election : Arakkonam
| Party | Candidate | Votes | % | ±% |
|---|---|---|---|---|
| AIADMK | M. Vijayasarathy | 36,314 | 48.84% | New |
| INC | G. Jayaraj | 35,393 | 47.60% | ▲28.70 |
| JP | M. Varadarajan | 1,486 | 2.00% | New |
| Independent | S. M. N. Natarajan | 758 | 1.02% | |
| Margin of victory | | 921 | 1.24% | ▼9.08 |
| Turnout | | 75,248 | 60.49% | ▼1.91 |
| Total valid votes | | 74,355 | | |
| Rejected ballots | | 893 | 1.19% | ▲0.04 |
| Registered electors | | 124,404 | | ▲4.36 |
| AIADMK gain from AIADMK | | Swing | ▲15.34 | |

=== Assembly election 1977 ===
1977 Tamil Nadu Legislative Assembly election : Arakkonam
| Party | Candidate | Votes | % | ±% |
|---|---|---|---|---|
| AIADMK | V. K. Raju | 24,630 | 33.50% | New |
| DMK | A. Kannayiram | 17,041 | 23.18% | ▼36.93 |
| JP | A. Jayaraman | 15,503 | 21.09% | New |
| INC | G. Jayaraj | 13,893 | 18.90% | New |
| Independent | V. Balraj | 1,342 | 1.83% | |
| Independent | K. Subramaniam | 1,116 | 1.52% | |
| Margin of victory | | 7,589 | 10.32% | ▼11.56 |
| Turnout | | 74,384 | 62.40% | ▼14.84 |
| Total valid votes | | 73,525 | | |
| Rejected ballots | | 859 | 1.15% | ▲1.15 |
| Registered electors | | 119,208 | | ▲21.84 |
| AIADMK gain from DMK | | Swing | ▼26.61 | |

=== Assembly election 1971 ===
1971 Tamil Nadu Legislative Assembly election : Arakkonam
| Party | Candidate | Votes | % | ±% |
|---|---|---|---|---|
| DMK | N. S. Balaraman | 42,256 | 60.11% | ▲7.33 |
| INC | S. K. Subramania Mudaly | 26,878 | 38.24% | New |
| Independent | Gajenthiran | 1,160 | 1.65% | |
| Margin of victory | | 15,378 | 21.88% | ▲11.44 |
| Turnout | | 75,572 | 77.24% | ▼5.81 |
| Total valid votes | | 70,294 | | |
| Registered electors | | 97,843 | | ▲7.25 |
| DMK hold | | Swing | | |

=== Assembly election 1967 ===
1967 Madras State Legislative Assembly election : Arakkonam
| Party | Candidate | Votes | % | ±% |
|---|---|---|---|---|
| DMK | S. J. Ramaswamy Mudali | 38,478 | 52.78% | ▲13.80 |
| INC | B. Naidu | 30,870 | 42.35% | ▲5.48 |
| Independent | Bakthavatchalam | 3,549 | 4.87% | |
| Margin of victory | | 7,608 | 10.44% | ▲8.34 |
| Turnout | | 75,765 | 83.05% | ▲2.07 |
| Total valid votes | | 72,897 | | |
| Registered electors | | 91,231 | | ▲3.69 |
| DMK hold | | Swing | | |

=== Assembly election 1962 ===
1962 Madras State Legislative Assembly election : Arakkonam
| Party | Candidate | Votes | % | ±% |
|---|---|---|---|---|
| DMK | S. J. Ramaswamy Mudali | 26,586 | 38.98% | New |
| INC | Bhaktavatsalu Naidu | 25,152 | 36.87% | ▼25.59 |
| RPI | P. Thomas | 6,798 | 9.97% | New |
| Independent | Duraswamy Reddi | 4,787 | 7.02% | |
| Independent | G. Deenadayalu Naidu | 3,161 | 4.63% | |
| SWA | Chockalinga Reddi | 1,728 | 2.53% | New |
| Margin of victory | | 1,434 | 2.10% | ▼38.20 |
| Turnout | | 71,248 | 80.98% | ▲25.51 |
| Total valid votes | | 68,212 | | |
| Registered electors | | 87,985 | | ▲2.76 |
| DMK gain from INC | | Swing | ▼23.48 | |

=== Assembly election 1957 ===
1957 Madras State Legislative Assembly election : Arakkonam
| Party | Candidate | Votes | % | ±% |
|---|---|---|---|---|
| INC | S. C. Sadayappa Mudaliar | 29,669 | 62.46% | ▲20.61 |
| Independent | P. Thomas | 10,527 | 22.16% | |
| Independent | A. L. C. Krishnasamy Naidu | 7,302 | 15.37% | |
| Margin of victory | | 19,142 | 40.30% | ▲36.17 |
| Turnout | | 47,498 | 55.47% | ▼11.80 |
| Total valid votes | | 47,498 | | |
| Registered electors | | 85,622 | | ▲25.76 |
| INC gain from Independent | | Swing | ▲16.48 | |

=== Assembly election 1952 ===
1952 Madras State Legislative Assembly election : Arakkonam
| Party | Candidate | Votes | % | ±% |
|---|---|---|---|---|
| Independent | Bhaktavatsalu Naidu | 21,057 | 45.98% | New |
| INC | Vedachalam | 19,165 | 41.85% | New |
| KMPP | Jamadagni | 3,933 | 8.59% | New |
| Independent | Amavasigan | 1,644 | 3.59% | New |
| Margin of victory | | 1,892 | 4.13% | |
| Turnout | | 45,799 | 67.27% | |
| Total valid votes | | 45,799 | | |
| Registered electors | | 68,084 | | |
| Independent win (new seat) | | | | |
