= S. Ravi (politician) =

Indian politician

Member of the Tamil Nadu Legislative Assembly
- In office 14 May 2011 – 5 May 2026
- Preceded by: M. Jagan Moorthy
- Constituency: Arakkonam

Personal details
- Born: 20 February 1964 (age 62) Arakkonam, Madras State, India
- Party: Tamilaga Vettri Kazhagam (2026-present)
- Other political affiliations: All India Anna Dravida Munnetra Kazhagam
- Parent: Subramani (father)
- Occupation: Politician

Subramani Ravi is an Indian politician and incumbent member of the Tamil Nadu Legislative Assembly from the Arakkonam constituency. Formerly a member of the All India Anna Dravida Munnetra Kazhagam, he currently represents the Tamilaga Vettri Kazhagam party, having joined in June 2026.

Ravi was elected to be a member of the 14th Tamil Nadu Legislative Assembly from Arakkonam and was re-elected in the elections of 2016.

== Electoral performance ==
Election	Constituency	Political party	Result	Vote %	Opposition			Ref
Election	Constituency	Political party	Result	Vote %	Candidate	Political party	Vote %	Ref
2006	Arakkonam	AIADMK	Lost	41.79%	M. Jaganmoorthy	DMK	47.17%	
2011	Arakkonam	AIADMK	Won	55.94%	S. Sellapandian	VCK	37.46%	
2016	Arakkonam	AIADMK	Won	41.21%	N. Rajkumar	DMK	38.69%	
2021	Arakkonam	AIADMK	Won	50.31%	J. Gowthama Sannah	VCK	34.30%	-
2026	Arakkonam	AIADMK	Lost	27.45%	V. Gandhiraj	TVK	40.46%	-
