= R. Indira Kumari =

Indian politician (1950/1951 – 2024)

R. Indira Kumari (1950/1951 – 15 April 2024) was an Indian politician and minister from the state of Tamil Nadu. She was elected to the Tamil Nadu legislative assembly as an Anna Dravida Munnetra Kazhagam candidate from Natrampalli constituency in the 1991 election. She served as a Social welfare minister in the J. Jayalalithaa cabinet during 1991–96. She switched parties and joined the Dravida Munnetra Kazhagam (DMK) in 2006.

On 29 September 2021, Indira Kumari and her husband, Babu, were convicted in a misappropriation of funds case, filed in 1996. The special court for MLAs and MPs sentenced them to five years in prison.

R. Indira Kumari died on 15 April 2024, at the age of 73.
