= V. K. Raju =

Indian politician

V. K. Raju is an Indian politician and former Member of the Legislative Assembly of Tamil Nadu. He was elected to the Tamil Nadu legislative assembly as a Dravida Munnetra Kazhagam candidate from Arakkonam constituency in 1977, 1984 and 1989 elections.

== Electoral performance ==
Election	Constituency	Political party	Result	Vote %	Opposition			Ref
Election	Constituency	Political party	Result	Vote %	Candidate	Political party	Vote %	Ref
1977	Arakkonam	AIADMK	Won	33.50%	A. Kannayiram	DMK	23.18%	
1984	Arakkonam	DMK	Won	52.24%	M. Vijayasarathy	AIADMK	45.98%	
1989	Arakkonam	DMK	Won	46.78%	P. Rajakumar	INC	22.60%	
