= K. K. Veerappan =

Indian politician (died 2022)

K. K. Veerappan (1944/1945 – 15 June 2022) was an Indian politician.

He was elected to the Tamil Nadu Legislative Assembly from the Kapilamalai constituency in the 1996 elections. He was a candidate of the Dravida Munnetra Kazhagam (DMK) party.

The DMK denied him the opportunity to contest the 2001 elections and later suspended him for alleged anti-party activities.
