= Kabilarmalai Assembly constituency =

Former legislative Assembly constituency in Andhra Pradesh, India

Coordinates: 11.15°N 77.94°E

Kabilarmalai
- Former constituency for the Tamil Nadu Legislative Assembly

Constituency details
- Country: India
- Region: South India
- State: Tamil Nadu
- District: Namakkal
- Established: 1962
- Abolished: 2008
- Total electors: 1,71,751

Kabilarmalai was former state assembly constituency in Namakkal district in Tamil Nadu.

== Members of the Legislative Assembly ==
=== Madras State ===
Year	Winner	Party
1962	V. Velappa Gounder	Dravida Munnetra Kazhagam
1967	C. V. Velappan	Dravida Munnetra Kazhagam

=== Tamil Nadu ===
Year	Winner	Party
1971	C. V. Velappan	Dravida Munnetra Kazhagam
1977	K. Sengodan	All India Anna Dravida Munnetra Kazhagam
1980	C. V. Velappan	All India Anna Dravida Munnetra Kazhagam
1984	P. Sengottaiyan	Indian National Congress
1989	K. A. Mani	Anna Dravida Munnetra Kazhagam (Jayalalitha)
1991	P. Saraswathi	All India Anna Dravida Munnetra Kazhagam
1996	K. K. Veerappan	Dravida Munnetra Kazhagam
2001	A. R. Malaiyappasamy	Pattali Makkal Katchi
2006	K. Nedumchezhiyan	Pattali Makkal Katchi

== Election results ==
=== 2006 ===
2006 Tamil Nadu Legislative Assembly election: Kapilamalai
Party	Candidate	Votes	%	±%
PMK	K. Nedunchezhian	58,048	47.25%	
MDMK	T. N. Guruswamy	49,101	39.96%	37.76%
DMDK	K. Selvi	9,576	7.79%	
Independent	K. Vijayakumar	1,639	1.33%	
Independent	E. Rangasamy	1,012	0.82%	
BJP	L. Raju	911	0.74%	
Independent	S. Egambaram	589	0.48%	
Independent	M. P. Dharmalingam	529	0.43%	
Independent	N. Yoganathan	387	0.31%	
Independent	K. Selvarasu	261	0.21%	
Independent	A. Palanivel	250	0.20%	
Margin of victory		8,947	7.28%	3.57%
Turnout		122,862	71.53%	8.36%
Registered electors		171,751		
PMK hold		Swing	5.50%	

=== 2001 ===
2001 Tamil Nadu Legislative Assembly election: Kapilamalai
Party	Candidate	Votes	%	±%
PMK	A. R. Malaiyappasamy	48,447	41.75%	
DMK	S. Gandhiselvan	44,135	38.03%	−17.96%
Independent	K. K. Veerappan	9,999	8.62%	
MDMK	K. C. Krishnamoorthy	2,563	2.21%	−4.62%
Independent	R. Tamilmani	2,341	2.02%	
Independent	K. T. Velavan	1,984	1.71%	
Independent	K. K. Shanmugam	1,830	1.58%	
Independent	R. Appan	1,770	1.53%	
Independent	C. Rajamani	1,022	0.88%	
RLD	D. Muthukumar	950	0.82%	
Independent	K. N. Sekar	666	0.57%	
Margin of victory		4,312	3.72%	−22.04%
Turnout		116,042	63.17%	−6.32%
Registered electors		183,691		
PMK gain from DMK		Swing	-14.25%	

=== 1996 ===
1996 Tamil Nadu Legislative Assembly election: Kapilamalai
Party	Candidate	Votes	%	±%
DMK	K. K. Veerappan	64,605	56.00%	29.29%
AIADMK	R. Rajalingam	34,895	30.25%	−36.78%
MDMK	M. Kandasamy	7,882	6.83%	
PMK	K. Chandrasekaran	5,221	4.53%	
BJP	A. Ramalingam	664	0.58%	
Independent	S. Ilango	355	0.31%	
Independent	K. Gunasekaran	203	0.18%	
Independent	K. C. Devaraj	159	0.14%	
Independent	A. Mani	132	0.11%	
Independent	P. Marimuthu	127	0.11%	
Independent	S. Velusamy	127	0.11%	
Margin of victory		29,710	25.75%	−14.57%
Turnout		115,369	69.49%	3.50%
Registered electors		171,394		
DMK gain from AIADMK		Swing	-11.03%	

=== 1991 ===
1991 Tamil Nadu Legislative Assembly election: Kapilamalai
Party	Candidate	Votes	%	±%
AIADMK	P. Saraswathi	72,903	67.03%	25.76%
DMK	S. Moorthy	29,050	26.71%	−7.00%
PMK	S. Ramesh	5,539	5.09%	
THMM	P. Ashok Kumar	259	0.24%	
Independent	M. Subramaniam	182	0.17%	
Independent	P. Chandrasekaran	153	0.14%	
Independent	C. Dhanapal	145	0.13%	
Independent	A. Selvam	140	0.13%	
Independent	R. K. Kaliappan	132	0.12%	
Independent	R. Murugesan	100	0.09%	
Independent	G. Krishnamoorthy	91	0.08%	
Margin of victory		43,853	40.32%	32.76%
Turnout		108,764	65.99%	−8.14%
Registered electors		169,105		
AIADMK hold		Swing	25.76%	

=== 1989 ===
1989 Tamil Nadu Legislative Assembly election: Kapilamalai
Party	Candidate	Votes	%	±%
AIADMK	K. A. Mani	46,223	41.27%	
DMK	K. S. Moorthy	37,757	33.71%	
INC	P. Sengottayan	23,201	20.72%	−32.81%
Independent	A. R. Chinnusamy	1,478	1.32%	
Independent	A. Mani	712	0.64%	
Independent	C. Palanisamy	614	0.55%	
Independent	K. Sekar	530	0.47%	
Independent	T. K. Ramasamy	302	0.27%	
Independent	K. Subbarayan	264	0.24%	
Independent	K. Netasan	174	0.16%	
Independent	S. Veeramani	146	0.13%	
Margin of victory		8,466	7.56%	−4.08%
Turnout		111,993	74.13%	−1.27%
Registered electors		153,675		
AIADMK gain from INC		Swing	-12.25%	

=== 1984 ===
1984 Tamil Nadu Legislative Assembly election: Kapilamalai
Party	Candidate	Votes	%	±%
INC	P. Sengottaiyan	51,233	53.52%	14.62%
Independent	K. A. Mani	40,090	41.88%	
Independent	V. P. Badrinarayanan	1,738	1.82%	
Independent	V. Aridhas	1,409	1.47%	
Independent	R. Kondappan	1,253	1.31%	
Margin of victory		11,143	11.64%	5.43%
Turnout		95,723	75.40%	8.02%
Registered electors		135,937		
INC gain from AIADMK		Swing	8.41%	

=== 1980 ===
1980 Tamil Nadu Legislative Assembly election: Kapilamalai
Party	Candidate	Votes	%	±%
AIADMK	C. V. Velappan	39,224	45.11%	8.57%
INC	P. Sengottaiyan	33,823	38.90%	24.84%
JP	V. S. Paramashivam	13,032	14.99%	
Independent	A. Mani	869	1.00%	
Margin of victory		5,401	6.21%	−7.58%
Turnout		86,948	67.38%	1.18%
Registered electors		131,117		
AIADMK hold		Swing	8.57%	

=== 1977 ===
1977 Tamil Nadu Legislative Assembly election: Kapilamalai
Party	Candidate	Votes	%	±%
AIADMK	K. Sengodan	30,194	36.54%	
JP	S. Paramasivam	18,798	22.75%	
Independent	P. Arunagiri	11,785	14.26%	
INC	P. R. Kumaramangalam	11,621	14.07%	−28.75%
DMK	V. Manivasaham	9,637	11.66%	−44.08%
Independent	A. Mani	587	0.71%	
Margin of victory		11,396	13.79%	0.87%
Turnout		82,622	66.20%	−5.37%
Registered electors		126,322		
AIADMK gain from DMK		Swing	-19.20%	

=== 1971 ===
1971 Tamil Nadu Legislative Assembly election: Kapilamalai
Party	Candidate	Votes	%	±%
DMK	C. V. Velappan	43,022	55.74%	3.49%
INC	P. Thyagarajan	33,045	42.82%	1.13%
Independent	A. Mani	1,113	1.44%	
Margin of victory		9,977	12.93%	2.36%
Turnout		77,180	71.57%	−6.81%
Registered electors		110,808		
DMK hold		Swing	3.49%	

=== 1967 ===
1967 Madras Legislative Assembly election: Kapilamalai
Party	Candidate	Votes	%	±%
DMK	C. V. Velappan	41,026	52.25%	−11.57%
INC	R. S. Gounder	32,733	41.69%	5.51%
Independent	P. Gounder	2,223	2.83%	
Independent	P. P. Naicker	1,945	2.48%	
Independent	K. R. Arumugam	590	0.75%	
Margin of victory		8,293	10.56%	−17.08%
Turnout		78,517	78.39%	6.49%
Registered electors		103,680		
DMK hold		Swing	-11.57%	

=== 1962 ===
1962 Madras Legislative Assembly election: Kapilamalai
Party	Candidate	Votes	%	±%
DMK	V. Velappa Gounder	36,960	63.82%	
INC	P. K. Ramalinga Gounder	20,954	36.18%	
Margin of victory		16,006	27.64%	
Turnout		57,914	71.90%	
Registered electors		83,811		
DMK win (new seat)				
