= S. J. Ramaswamy Mudali =

Indian politician

S. J. Ramaswamy Mudaliar is an Indian politician and former Member of the Legislative Assembly of Tamil Nadu. He was elected to the Tamil Nadu legislative assembly as a Dravida Munnetra Kazhagam candidate from Arakkonam constituency in 1962 and 1967 elections. He was elected from Sholinghur constituency as an Anna Dravida Munnetra Kazhagamin 1977 election.

== Electoral performance ==
Election	Constituency	Political party	Result	Vote %	Opposition			Ref
Election	Constituency	Political party	Result	Vote %	Candidate	Political party	Vote %	Ref
1962	Arakkonam	DMK	Won	38.98%	B. Baktavatsalu Naidu	INC	36.87%	
1967	Arakkonam	DMK	Won	52.78%	B. Baktavatsalu Naidu	INC	42.35%	
1977	Sholingur	AIADMK	Won	38.23%	K. Murthi	DMK	29.93%	
