= Kallipalayam =

- Village
- Location in Tamil Nadu Location in India Location in Asia Location in Earth
- Coordinates: 11.08109°N 77.95286°E
- Country: India
- State: Tamil Nadu
- District: Namakkal
- Time zone: UTC+5:30 (IST)
- PIN: 637208
- STD Code: 04268
- Vehicle registration: TN-88
- Nearest city: Paramathi velur
- Lok Sabha constituency: Namakkal

Kallipalayam is a village in Vengarai panchayat of Namakkal district in Tamil Nadu, India. Kallipalayam is part of Kongu Nadu located on the banks of River Kaveri. Around 500 families peacefully live in this village. Agriculture and transport are major businesses in this village. Mr. C. V. Velappan was born in this village. He was the sitting MLA in the Kabilarmalai constituency during M. G. Ramachandran's administration.
