= M. Vijayasarathy =

Indian politician

M. Vijayasarathy is an Indian politician and former Member of the Legislative Assembly of Tamil Nadu. He was elected to the Tamil Nadu legislative assembly as an Anna Dravida Munnetra Kazhagam candidate from Arakkonam constituency in 1980 election.

== Electoral performance ==
Election	Constituency	Political party	Result	Vote %	Opposition			Ref
Election	Constituency	Political party	Result	Vote %	Candidate	Political party	Vote %	Ref
1980	Arakkonam	AIADMK	Won	48.84%	G. Jayaraj	INC	47.60%	
1984	Arakkonam	AIADMK	Lost	45.98%	V. K. Raju	DMK	52.24%	
