= R. Thamizh Chelvan =

Indian politician

R. Thamizh Chelvan is an Indian politician and former Member of the Legislative Assembly of Tamil Nadu. He was elected to the Tamil Nadu legislative assembly as a Dravida Munnetra Kazhagam candidate from Arakkonam constituency in 1996 election.

== Electoral performance ==
Election	Constituency	Political party	Result	Vote %	Opposition			Ref
Election	Constituency	Political party	Result	Vote %	Candidate	Political party	Vote %	Ref
1996	Arakkonam	DMK	Won	58.13%	R. Elumalai	PMK	19.55%	
