= S. C. Sadayappa Mudaliar =

Indian politician

S. C. Sadayappa Mudaliar was an Indian politician and former Member of the Legislative Assembly of Tamil Nadu. He was elected to the Tamil Nadu Legislative Assembly as an Indian National Congress candidate from Arakkonam constituency in 1957 election.

== Electoral performance ==
Election	Constituency	Political party	Result	Vote %	Opposition			Ref
Election	Constituency	Political party	Result	Vote %	Candidate	Political party	Vote %	Ref
1957	Arakkonam	INC	Won	62.46%	P. Thomas	Independent	22.16%	
