= Natrampalli Assembly constituency =

Former Legislative Assembly Constituency in Tamil Nadu, India

Coordinates: 12.59°N 78.50°E

Natrampalli
- Former constituency for the Tamil Nadu Legislative Assembly

Constituency details
- Country: India
- Region: South India
- State: Tamil Nadu
- District: Tirupathur
- Lok Sabha constituency: Vellore
- Established: 1967
- Abolished: 2008
- Total electors: 2,10,823

Natrampalli is a state assembly constituency in Vellore district in Tamil Nadu. Elections and winners in the constituency are listed below.

== Members of the Legislative Assembly ==
Year	Winner	Party
1967	T. C. Thimmaraya Gounder	Dravida Munnetra Kazhagam
1971	T. C. Thimmaraya Gounder	Dravida Munnetra Kazhagam
1977	T. Anbazhagan	All India Anna Dravida Munnetra Kazhagam
1980	T. Anbazhagan	All India Anna Dravida Munnetra Kazhagam
1984	T. Anbazhagan	All India Anna Dravida Munnetra Kazhagam
1989	R. Mahendran	Dravida Munnetra Kazhagam
1991	R. Indrakumari	All India Anna Dravida Munnetra Kazhagam
1996	R. Mahendran	Dravida Munnetra Kazhagam
2001	S. Natarajan	Pattali Makkal Katchi
2006	N. K. R. Sooriyakumar	Dravida Munnetra Kazhagam

== Election results ==
=== 2006 ===
2006 Tamil Nadu Legislative Assembly election: Natrampalli
Party	Candidate	Votes	%	±%
DMK	N. K. R. Sooriyakumar	78,689	50.79%	
AIADMK	K. G. Subramani	61,446	39.66%	
DMDK	A. Fayas Basha	8,951	5.78%	
BJP	P. Pushparaj	1,931	1.25%	
Independent	S. Varadharajan	1,466	0.95%	
Independent	M. Prakasam	681	0.44%	
Independent	K. Shamaraj	549	0.35%	
NCP	K. Perumal	346	0.22%	
BSP	K. Ramamoorthy	335	0.22%	
Independent	K. Devaraj	290	0.19%	
Independent	K. Chinnathambi	232	0.15%	
Margin of victory		17,243	11.13%	2.30%
Turnout		154,916	73.48%	5.78%
Registered electors		210,823		
DMK gain from PMK		Swing	1.83%	

=== 2001 ===
2001 Tamil Nadu Legislative Assembly election: Natrampalli
Party	Candidate	Votes	%	±%
PMK	S. Natarajan	67,046	48.96%	
MGRK	T. Anbazhagan	54,958	40.13%	
MDMK	P. Krishnamurthy	4,352	3.18%	1.61%
Independent	K. Perumal	3,033	2.21%	
Independent	T. Amirtham	2,995	2.19%	
Independent	B. A. Asokan	2,447	1.79%	
Independent	K. Prema Barathi	1,104	0.81%	
Independent	S. Kalahastri	1,003	0.73%	
Margin of victory		12,088	8.83%	6.28%
Turnout		136,938	67.70%	−2.29%
Registered electors		202,275		
PMK gain from DMK		Swing	9.31%	

=== 1996 ===
1996 Tamil Nadu Legislative Assembly election: Natrampalli
Party	Candidate	Votes	%	±%
DMK	R. Mahendran	50,118	39.65%	11.31%
Independent	T. Anbazhagan	46,897	37.10%	
AIADMK	H. D. Hanumanthan	24,321	19.24%	−48.81%
PMK	A. C. Mahendiran	2,105	1.67%	
MDMK	K. Rajendran	1,987	1.57%	
BSP	B. C. Vajjiram	193	0.15%	
Independent	T. H. Kasinathan	177	0.14%	
Independent	P. K. Arjunan	165	0.13%	
Independent	C. Magadevan	150	0.12%	
Independent	A. G. Pannerselvan	128	0.10%	
Independent	P. Venkatesan	84	0.07%	
Margin of victory		3,221	2.55%	−37.16%
Turnout		126,395	69.99%	−0.12%
Registered electors		194,832		
DMK gain from AIADMK		Swing	-28.40%	

=== 1991 ===
1991 Tamil Nadu Legislative Assembly election: Natrampalli
Party	Candidate	Votes	%	±%
AIADMK	R. Indira Kumari	81,446	68.05%	44.39%
DMK	N. K. Raja	33,917	28.34%	−3.66%
PMK	A. C. Mahendiran	3,837	3.21%	
	V. N. Thathappan	329	0.27%	
Independent	V. Ramasamy	153	0.13%	
Margin of victory		47,529	39.71%	31.38%
Turnout		119,682	70.10%	−3.00%
Registered electors		176,023		
AIADMK gain from DMK		Swing	36.06%	

=== 1989 ===
1989 Tamil Nadu Legislative Assembly election: Natrampalli
Party	Candidate	Votes	%	±%
DMK	R. Mahendran	36,774	32.00%	3.72%
AIADMK	A. R. Rajendran	27,193	23.66%	−34.88%
AIADMK	T. Anbazhagan	21,558	18.76%	−39.79%
INC	V. K. Kamalalakannan	18,906	16.45%	
Independent	Arumugam	8,944	7.78%	
Independent	M. Kannan	478	0.42%	
India Farmers and Tailers Party	S. Kalahastri	353	0.31%	
Independent	A. G. Panneerselvam	244	0.21%	
Independent	S. M. Raja	151	0.13%	
Independent	K. Anandan	111	0.10%	
Independent	V. N. Krishnamurthy	84	0.07%	
Margin of victory		9,581	8.34%	−21.93%
Turnout		114,931	73.10%	−2.22%
Registered electors		160,322		
DMK gain from AIADMK		Swing	-26.55%	

=== 1984 ===
1984 Tamil Nadu Legislative Assembly election: Natrampalli
Party	Candidate	Votes	%	±%
AIADMK	T. Anbazhagan	56,503	58.55%	8.72%
DMK	N. K. Raja	27,293	28.28%	−13.83%
Independent	Durai Jayaraman	11,000	11.40%	
BJP	G. K. Velayudham	544	0.56%	
Independent	A. Mani	419	0.43%	
Independent	B. C. Vajjiram	341	0.35%	
Independent	V. Subramaniam	223	0.23%	
Independent	Mani Varadarajan	123	0.13%	
Independent	Manickammal	66	0.07%	
Margin of victory		29,210	30.27%	22.55%
Turnout		96,512	75.32%	6.76%
Registered electors		137,300		
AIADMK hold		Swing	8.72%	

=== 1980 ===
1980 Tamil Nadu Legislative Assembly election: Natrampalli
Party	Candidate	Votes	%	±%
AIADMK	T. Anbazhagan	42,786	49.82%	5.39%
DMK	N. K. Raja	36,161	42.11%	20.67%
JP	K P. Namachivayam	6,934	8.07%	
Margin of victory		6,625	7.71%	−15.29%
Turnout		85,881	68.56%	8.34%
Registered electors		127,218		
AIADMK hold		Swing	5.39%	

=== 1977 ===
1977 Tamil Nadu Legislative Assembly election: Natrampalli
Party	Candidate	Votes	%	±%
AIADMK	T. Anbazhagan	31,015	44.43%	
DMK	M. Marappan	14,960	21.43%	−33.90%
JP	R. V. Lakshmipathy Gounder	14,294	20.48%	
INC	T. M. Kandasamy Gounder	6,161	8.83%	−35.84%
Independent	L. K. Karibeera Gounder	1,432	2.05%	
Independent	N. Krishnan	788	1.13%	
Independent	M. Ramaswami	694	0.99%	
Independent	S. S. Singaravelu	456	0.65%	
Margin of victory		16,055	23.00%	12.33%
Turnout		69,800	60.22%	−14.40%
Registered electors		117,533		
AIADMK gain from DMK		Swing	-10.90%	

=== 1971 ===
1971 Tamil Nadu Legislative Assembly election: Natrampalli
Party	Candidate	Votes	%	±%
DMK	T. C. Thimmaraya Gounder	33,303	55.33%	3.16%
INC	K. Shanmugasundaram	26,882	44.67%	−3.16%
Margin of victory		6,421	10.67%	6.31%
Turnout		60,185	74.62%	1.55%
Registered electors		84,331		
DMK hold		Swing	3.16%	

=== 1967 ===
1967 Madras Legislative Assembly election: Natrampalli
Party	Candidate	Votes	%	±%
DMK	T. C. Thimmaraya Gounder	29,215	52.18%	
INC	R. C. S. Gounder	26,776	47.82%	
Margin of victory		2,439	4.36%	
Turnout		55,991	73.07%	
Registered electors		79,565		
DMK win (new seat)				
