= K. Bhavani Karunakaran =

Indian politician

K. Bhavani Karunakaran is an Indian politician and former Member of the Legislative Assembly of Tamil Nadu. She was elected to the Tamil Nadu legislative assembly as an Anna Dravida Munnetra Kazhagam candidate from Arakkonam constituency in 2001 election.

== Electoral performance ==
Election	Constituency	Political party	Result	Vote %	Opposition			Ref
Election	Constituency	Political party	Result	Vote %	Candidate	Political party	Vote %	Ref
2001	Arakkonam	AIADMK	Won	55.09%	R. Ravishankar	DMK	38.44%	
