= Uzhavar Uzhaippalar Katchi =

Political party

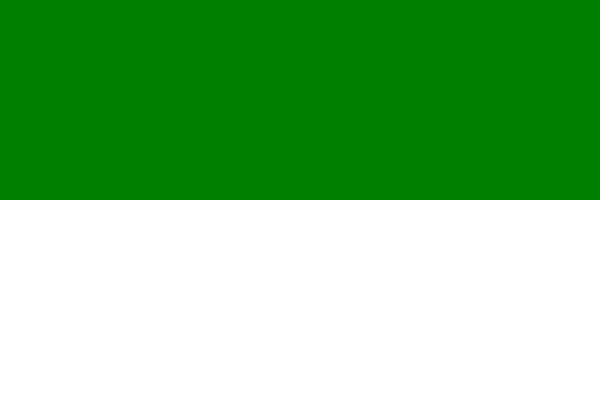
Flag of the party

Uzhavar Uzhaippalar Katchi (UUK) (Tamil: உழவர் உழைப்பாளர் கட்சி, 'Farmers and Workers Party'), a political party in the Indian state of Tamil Nadu.The president of UUK is vettavalam Manikandan.

UUK supported the Admk-led National Democratic Alliance in 1998 Loksabha Election and Dmk-led NDA in the 2001 Tamil Nadu assembly elections. At the time, NDA in Tamil Nadu was dominated by the (DMK).

The party opposes the introduction of genetically modified rice in the agriculture of Tamil Nadu.
