= B. Baktavatsalu Naidu =

Indian politician

Bhaktavatsalu Naidu

Member of the Madras State Assembly
- In office 1952–1962
- Preceded by: Vedachalam
- Constituency: Arakkonam

Personal details
- Party: Independent politician

B. Baktavatsalu Naidu was an Indian politician, and a member of the Legislative Assembly of Madras state (modern day Tamil Nadu). He was elected to the Tamil Nadu legislative assembly as an independent candidate from Arakkonam constituency in 1952 election. He served as the Deputy Speaker of the Madras Legislative Assembly from 1952 to 1962.

== Electoral performance ==
Election	Constituency	Political party	Result	Vote %	Opposition			Ref
Election	Constituency	Political party	Result	Vote %	Candidate	Political party	Vote %	Ref
1952	Arakkonam	Independent	Won	45.98%	Vedachalam	INC	41.85%	
1962	Arakkonam	INC	Lost	36.87%	S. J. Ramaswamy Mudali	DMK	38.98%	
