= K. A. Mani =

Indian politician

K. A. Mani is an Indian politician and former member of the Tamil Nadu Legislative Assembly. He was elected to the Tamil Nadu Legislative Assembly as an All India Anna Dravida Munnetra Kazhagam candidate from Kabilarmalai constituency. He is a native of Koodacheri village, near Paramathi-Velur.
