= C. V. Velappan =

Indian politician

C. V. Velappan was an Indian politician and former Member of the Legislative Assembly of Tamil Nadu. He was elected to the Tamil Nadu legislative assembly as a Dravida Munnetra Kazhagam candidate from Kabilarmalai constituency in 1967, and 1971 elections and as an Anna Dravida Munnetra Kazhagam candidate in 1980 election. He was from Kallipalayam.
