= Govindan =

Govindan is a name. People with the name include:

- M. V. Govindan
- G. Govindan
- T. K. Govindan
- M. Govindan
- Marshall Govindan
- Santhini Govindan
- E. K. Govindan
- P. Govindan
- R. Govindan
- Ramesh Govindan
- Pulavar K. Govindan
- V. Govindan
- Chadayan Govindan
- T. Govindan
- M. R. Govindan
- Rajeev Govindan
- Velayudhan Govindan
- Govindan Pallikappil
- Govindan Rangarajan
- Govindan Aravindan
- Govindan Kutty Adoor
- Govindan Rajamohan
- Govindan Sundararajan
- Govindan Lakshmanan
- T K Govindan Master
- P. Govindan Kutty
- Edasseri Govindan Nair
- Chandramana Govindan Namboothiri
- M. P. Govindan Nair
- Paravoor Govindan Devarajan
- N. Govindan Kutty
- P. Govindan Nambiar
- Mathoor Govindan Kutty
- Kambalath Govindan Nair
- Kolady Govindan Kutty Menon
- V. K. Govindan Nair
- M. N. Govindan Nair
- Sithamalli Govindan Murugaiyan
- Kenoth Govindan Adiyodi
