= S. Sundararaj =

Indian politician

Member of the Legislative Assembly
- In office 1984–1996
- Preceded by: K. Baluchamy
- Succeeded by: U. Thisaiveeran
- Constituency: Paramakudi
- In office 2011–2016
- Preceded by: R. Ramprabhu
- Succeeded by: Dr. S. Muthiah
- Constituency: Paramakudi

Personal details
- Party: All India Anna Dravida Munnetra Kazhagam

S. Sundararaj is an Indian politician and member of the Tamil Nadu Legislative Assembly from the Paramakudi constituency. He was elected to the Tamil Nadu legislative assembly as an Anna Dravida Munnetra Kazhagam (Jayalalitha) candidate in the 1989 and 1991 elections. He is the former minister for Youth Welfare and Sports Development of the government of Tamil Nadu.

A cabinet reshuffle by Jayaram Jayalalithaa in November 2011 saw Sundararaj replace B. V. Ramanaa as Minister for Handlooms, while Ramanaa became Minister for the Environment.

He was criticized for humiliating female hockey players during a visit to a school in Pudukottai.

== Political career ==
=== Tamilnadu Legislative Assembly Elections Contested ===
Elections	Constituency	Party	Result	Vote percentage	Opposition Candidate	Opposition Party	Opposition vote percentage
1989 Tamil Nadu Legislative Assembly election	Paramakudi	AIADMK(J)	Won	36.53	K. V. R. Kandasmay	DMK	33.20
1991 Tamil Nadu Legislative Assembly election	Paramakudi	AIADMK	Won	66.72	S. Jeyapaul	CPI	26.35
1996 Tamil Nadu Legislative Assembly election	Paramakudi	AIADMK	Lost	22.53	U. Thisaiveeran	DMK	43.18
2006 Tamil Nadu Legislative Assembly election	Paramakudi	AIADMK	Lost	44.42	R. Ramprabhu	INC	45.36
2011 Tamil Nadu Legislative Assembly election	Paramakudi	AIADMK	Won	57.88	R. Ramprabhu	INC	34.63
