= Govindankutty (disambiguation) =

Govindankutty, or N. Govindan Kutty (1924–1994), was an Indian actor in Malayalam-language films.

Govindankutty may also refer to:

- Govindankutty (actor) (fl. 21st century), Indian actor in Malayalam-language films
- Mathoor Govindan Kutty (1940–2021), Indian Kathakali artist
- P. Govindan Kutty (died 2007), Indian Kathakali artist

== See also ==
- Govindan
