= Kodiyalur Agastheeswarar Temple =

Coordinates: 10°57′44″N 79°38′30″E

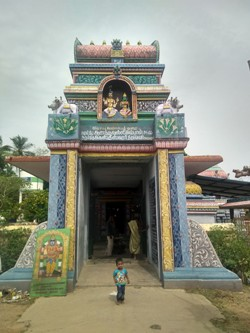
Entrance

Kodiyalur Agastheeswarar Temple, is a Hindu temple situated at Kodiyalur near Peralam in Tiruvarur district of Tamil Nadu, India.

== Presiding deity ==
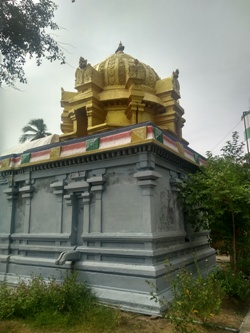
Vimana of the presiding deity

The presiding deity of the temple is Agastheeswarar and the Goddess is Anandavalli. In the prakara shrines of Muruga, Vinayaka, Chandikesvara, Navagraha, Bhairava, and Lakshmi are found.

== Speciality ==
Like Tirunallar and Tirukkollikkadu Shani is found in a separate shrine. This is the birth place of Shani and Yama and they worshipped in this temple. Surya alongwith his consorts Sayadevi and Ushadevi also worshipped here. The shrine of Yama is found in the south and Shani in North.
