= S. Murugesan =

S. Murugesan may refer to:

- S. Murugesan (AIADMK politician)
- S. Murugesan (DMK politician)
