= R. Ramprabhu =

Tamil Nadu politician

K. V. R. Ramprabu
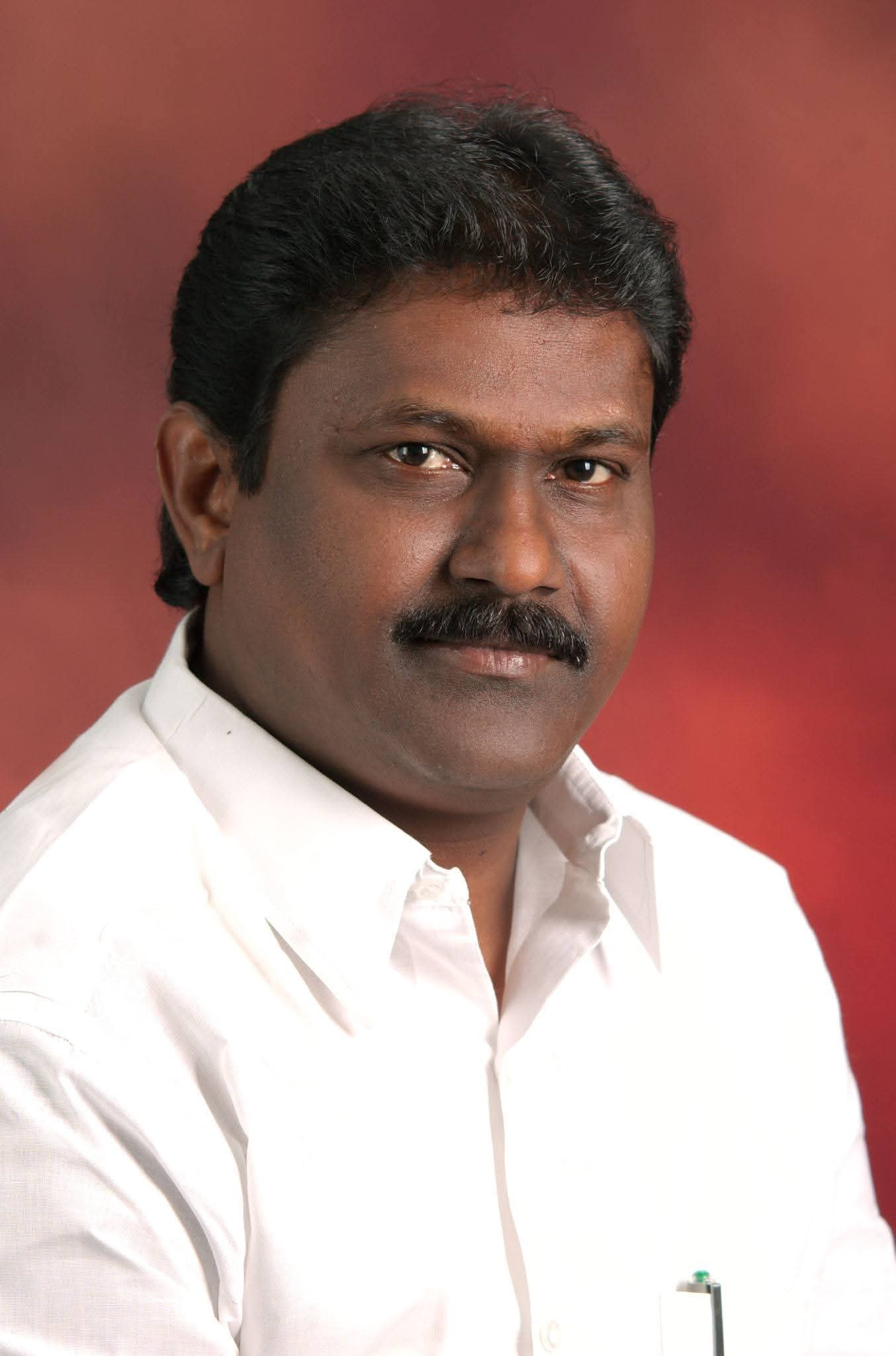
- K. V. R. Ramprabu

Member of the Legislative Assembly
- In office 13 May 2001 – 13 May 2011
- Preceded by: U. Thisaiveeran
- Succeeded by: S. Sundararaj
- Constituency: Paramakudi

Personal details
- Born: November 5, 1967 (age 58) Paramakudi, Ramanathapuram district, Tamil Nadu, India
- Party: Tamil Maanila Congress (Moopanar)
- Other political affiliations: Indian National Congress
- Spouse: Jeeva Ramprabu
- Children: 2
- Profession: Advocate

K. V. Rakkan Ramprabu (born 5 November 1967) is a Tamil politician and advocate from Tamil Nadu. He served as a two-term Member of the Legislative Assembly representing the Paramakudi constituency in the Tamil Nadu Legislative Assembly from 2001 to 2011.

He was elected in the 2001 Tamil Nadu Legislative Assembly election as a candidate of the Tamil Maanila Congress (Moopanar), and was re-elected in the 2006 election as a candidate of the Indian National Congress.

== Early life and education ==
Ramprabu was born in Paramakudi, Ramanathapuram district, Tamil Nadu. He belongs to the Scheduled Caste community. He completed a Bachelor of Arts (B.A.) and Bachelor of Laws (LL.B.) degree and later enrolled as an advocate with the Bar Council.

He is the son of K. V. Rakkan, an advocate and former Congress leader in Ramanathapuram district.

== Political career ==
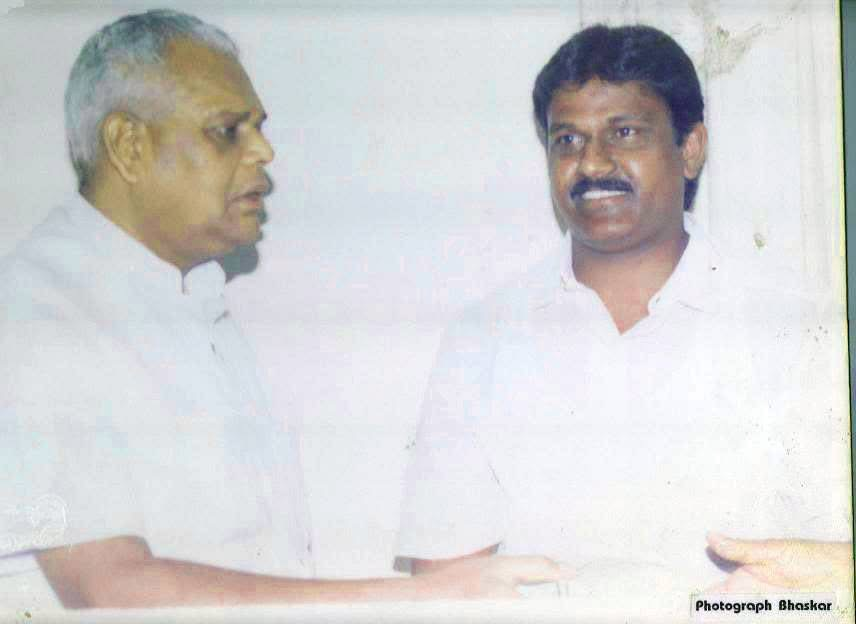
Ramprabu with G. K. Moopanar

Ramprabu began his political career as Secretary of the Tamil Nadu Youth Congress Committee.

In 1996, following the formation of the Tamil Maanila Congress (Moopanar) by G. K. Moopanar after its split from the Indian National Congress, Ramprabu aligned with the party.

He was elected to the Tamil Nadu Legislative Assembly from Paramakudi constituency in 2001 as a candidate of the Tamil Maanila Congress (Moopanar).

He was re-elected in the 2006 Tamil Nadu Legislative Assembly election as a candidate of the Indian National Congress.

He served two consecutive terms until 2011.

Following subsequent political realignments, including the revival of the Tamil Maanila Congress under G. K. Vasan, he continued his association with the party and has served as State President of the SC/ST Wing of the Tamil Maanila Congress (Moopanar).

== Legislative tenure (2001–2011) ==
During his tenure, development initiatives in the Paramakudi constituency included expansion of municipal borewells, improvements in sanitation infrastructure in rural areas, and implementation of the Cauvery Combined Water Supply Scheme.

Paramakudi has historically been regarded as a communally sensitive constituency. During his tenure from 2001 to 2011, no major incidents of communal violence resulting in significant loss of life or property were officially recorded within the constituency.

== Legal career ==
Ramprabu practices law in Ramanathapuram district. He has served as President of the Tamil Nadu Bar Association (TNBA), Ramanathapuram district. He is also associated with Onyx Animation Studio as proprietor.

== Personal life ==
Ramprabu is married to Jeeva Ramprabu, an engineer and former member of the Indian Youth Congress. The couple have two children.

== Early life and education ==
Ramprabu was born on 5 November 1967 in Paramakudi, Ramanathapuram district, Tamil Nadu. He belongs to the Scheduled Caste community. He completed a Bachelor of Arts (B.A.) and Bachelor of Laws (LL.B.) degree and enrolled as an advocate with the Bar Council.

== Legal career ==
Ramprabu practices law in Ramanathapuram district. He served as President of the Tamil Nadu Bar Association (TNBA), Ramanathapuram district. He is also associated with Onyx Animation Studio as proprietor.

== Political career ==
Ramprabu began his political career as Secretary of the Tamil Nadu Youth Congress Committee. In 1996, he joined the Tamil Maanila Congress (Moopanar), founded by G. K. Moopanar following the party's split from the Indian National Congress.

Following subsequent political realignments, including the merger of the Tamil Maanila Congress with the Indian National Congress and its later revival under G. K. Vasan, he continued his association with the Tamil Maanila Congress (Moopanar). He has served as the State President of the SC/ST Wing of the party.

== Legislative tenure (2001–2011) ==
Ramprabu was elected from the Paramakudi constituency in 2001 and re-elected in 2006. He served two consecutive terms in the Tamil Nadu Legislative Assembly.

During his tenure, development initiatives in the constituency included expansion of borewells in Paramakudi Municipality, improvements in rural sanitation infrastructure, and implementation of the Cauvery Combined Water Supply Scheme in the region.

Paramakudi has historically been regarded as a communally sensitive constituency. During his tenure (2001–2011), no major incidents of communal violence resulting in significant loss of life or property were officially recorded within the constituency.

== Political background ==
He is the son of K. V. Rakkan, an advocate and Congress leader who served as Vice President of the Ramanathapuram District Congress Committee, Director of Pandian Grama Bank, and Member of the Southern Railway Recruitment Board.

== Personal life ==
Ramprabu is married to Jeeva Ramprabu, an engineer and former Indian Youth Congress member. She is also associated with the Tamil Maanila Congress (Moopanar). They have two children.

== Political career ==
=== Tamil Nadu Legislative Assembly Elections Contested ===
Elections	Constituency	Party	Result	Vote percentage	Opposition Candidate	Opposition Party	Opposition vote percentage
2001 Tamil Nadu Legislative Assembly election	Paramakudi	TMC(M)	Won	49.58	S. Chelliah	PT	44.22
2006 Tamil Nadu Legislative Assembly election	Paramakudi	INC	Won	45.36	Dr.S. Sundararaj	AIADMK	44.42
2011 Tamil Nadu Legislative Assembly election	Paramakudi	INC	Lost	34.63	Dr.S. Sundararaj	AIADMK	57.88
