= Najeeb Kanthapuram =

Legislator

Najeeb Kanthapuram MLA
- നജീബ് കാന്തപുരം
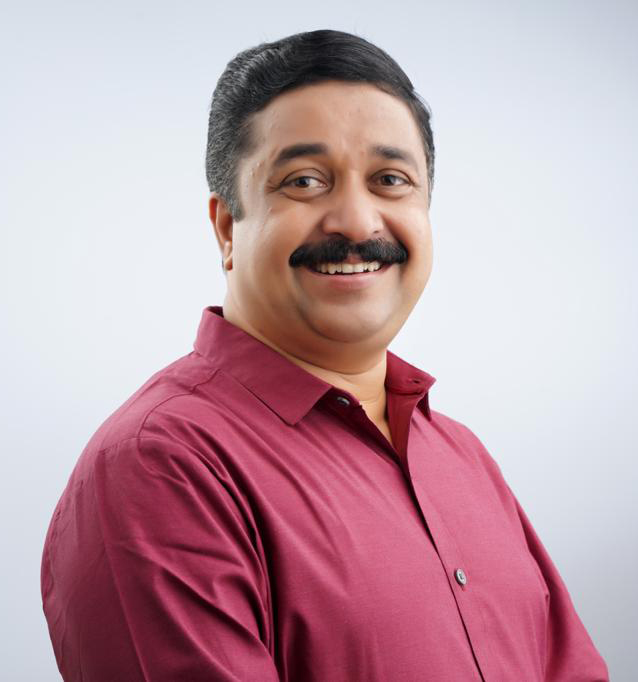

Member of the Kerala Legislative Assembly for Perinthalmanna
- In office 2026–Incumbent
- Preceded by: Himself
- In office 2021–2026
- Preceded by: Manjalamkuzhi Ali

Personal details
- Born: 20 April 1975 (age 51) Kozhikode
- Education: Bachelor of Arts from Farook College; Bachelor of Education from University of Calicut (1996)

Najeeb Kanthapuram is an Indian politician, writer, academic, newspaper editor, and journalist. He belongs to Indian Union Muslim League. He was elected as a member of Kerala Legislative Assembly from the Perinthalmanna constituency on 2 May 2021 and re-elected in 21 May 2026.

== Early life ==
Najeeb Kanthapuram was born to Muhammad Master at Kozhikode on 20 April 1975. He was graduated as a Bachelor of Arts from Farook College, Kozhikode, and as a Bachelor of Education from University of Calicut in the year 1996. He has completed his LLB from law academy Trivandrum in year 2025. He was a journalist who worked with Chandrika (newspaper) over 20 years. He worked in Chandrika (newspaper) in different roles and resigned while he was working as Chief Sub Editor. He has started his political career as unit president of Muslim Students Federation. Later on he became panchayath office bearer of Muslim youth league, then president of Koduvally constituency Muslim Youth League. Later he worked as district youth league treasurer two times. Then he was elected as district youth league president by election. Then he became the senior vice president of MYL, Kerala State.

== Political career ==
Earlier, Najeeb Kanthapuram had been the senior vice-president of MYL since December 2016. Due to the end of term of the last sitting MLA Manjalamkuzhi Ali, Perinthalmanna went to poll as a part of 2021 Kerala general election on 6 April 2021. Najeeb Kanthapuram was the candidate fielded by UDF from Perinthalmanna. There were 217,959 registered voters in Perinthalmanna Constituency for the election. Najeeb Kanthapuram won the election by a narrow margin of 38 votes, making it the lowest victory margin in the election .

== Election Performance ==
2021 Kerala Legislative Assembly election: Perinthalmanna
Party	Candidate	Votes	%	±%
IUML	Najeeb Kanthapuram	76,530	46.21%	▼0.68
LDF	K. P. M. Musthafa	76,492	46.19%	▼0.31
BJP	Suchitra Mattada	8,021	4.84%	▲0.93
Independent	Adv. Abdul Afsal. P. T	906	0.55%	N/A
NOTA	None of the above	867	0.52%	▲0.19
Independent	Najeeb Kutteeri	828	0.50%	N/A
Independent	Muhammad Musthafa. K. P	751	0.45%	N/A
Independent	Musthafa. P. K	750	0.45%	N/A
Independent	Musthafa S/O Muhammad	471	0.28%	N/A
Margin of victory		38	0.02%	▼0.37
Turnout		1,62,875	74.73%	▼2.93
IUML hold		Swing	▼0.68	

== Writer ==
Apart from being a journalist he made imprints in his career as a lyricist and director. He directed "INIYUM" a socially relevant docu-fiction film based on Nandigram Bengal. He contributed as a lyricist in "'പാടുക നിലാവേ" (Paaduka Nilaave), a ghazal music album composed by V.T. Murali. Singers of the album were M. Jayachandran, P. Sujatha, Venugopal. In 2013 MT Vasudevan Nair released the album "JAYAHE" a revolutionary song written during CPIM Protest gained wide popularity. The song containing the lyrics "ഇത്രയേയുള്ളൂവെന്നറിയുവാന്‍ നമ്മളെത്രദൂരം നടന്നു" (ithreyulluvennariyuvaan nammalethra dhooram nadanu) became popular among the people.

== Awards and achievements ==
He won several achievements in poetry and speeches since his student life. In the year 2004, he won IMA State award for the feature story അര്‍ബുദത്തിന്റെ തീ നാമ്പുകള്‍, (arbudhathinte thee naambukal) awarded by then health minister M.A. Kuttapan. In 2011, he won K.V. Surendranath state award for best editorial for "ലജ്ജിച്ചു തല താഴ്ത്തുക നാം" (lajjichu thalathaythuka naam) a socially relevant editorial published in Chandrika daily on 9 December 2010. He received the award from the famous poet O.N.V. Kurup at the award ceremony held in Trivandrum.
