= K. K. Kathiravan =

Indian politician (born 1986)

K. K. Kathiravan (born 1986) is an Indian politician from Tamil Nadu. He is a member of the Tamil Nadu Legislative Assembly from the Paramakudi Assembly constituency in Ramanathapuram district representing the Dravida Munnetra Kazhagam.

== Early life ==
Kathiravan is from Paramakudi, Ramanathapuram district, Tamil Nadu. He did his schooling at Pallivasal Higher Secondary School, Mudukulathur and passed the SSLC examinations in 2001. He completed his Class 12 at Keela Muslim Higher Secondary School, Paramakudi in 2003. Later, he completed his LLB in 2015 at Dr. Ambedkar Global Law Institute which is affiliated with Sri Venkateswara University, Tirupati.

== Career ==
Kathiravan won the Paramakudi Assembly constituency representing the Dravida Munnetra Kazhagam in the 2026 Tamil Nadu Legislative Assembly election. He polled 59,161 votes and defeated his nearest rival, G. Gopirajan of Tamilaga Vettri Kazhagam, by a margin of 3,548 votes.
