= Natarajan Pandiyan =

Indian physician and academic (born 1953)

Dr. Natarajan Pandiyan
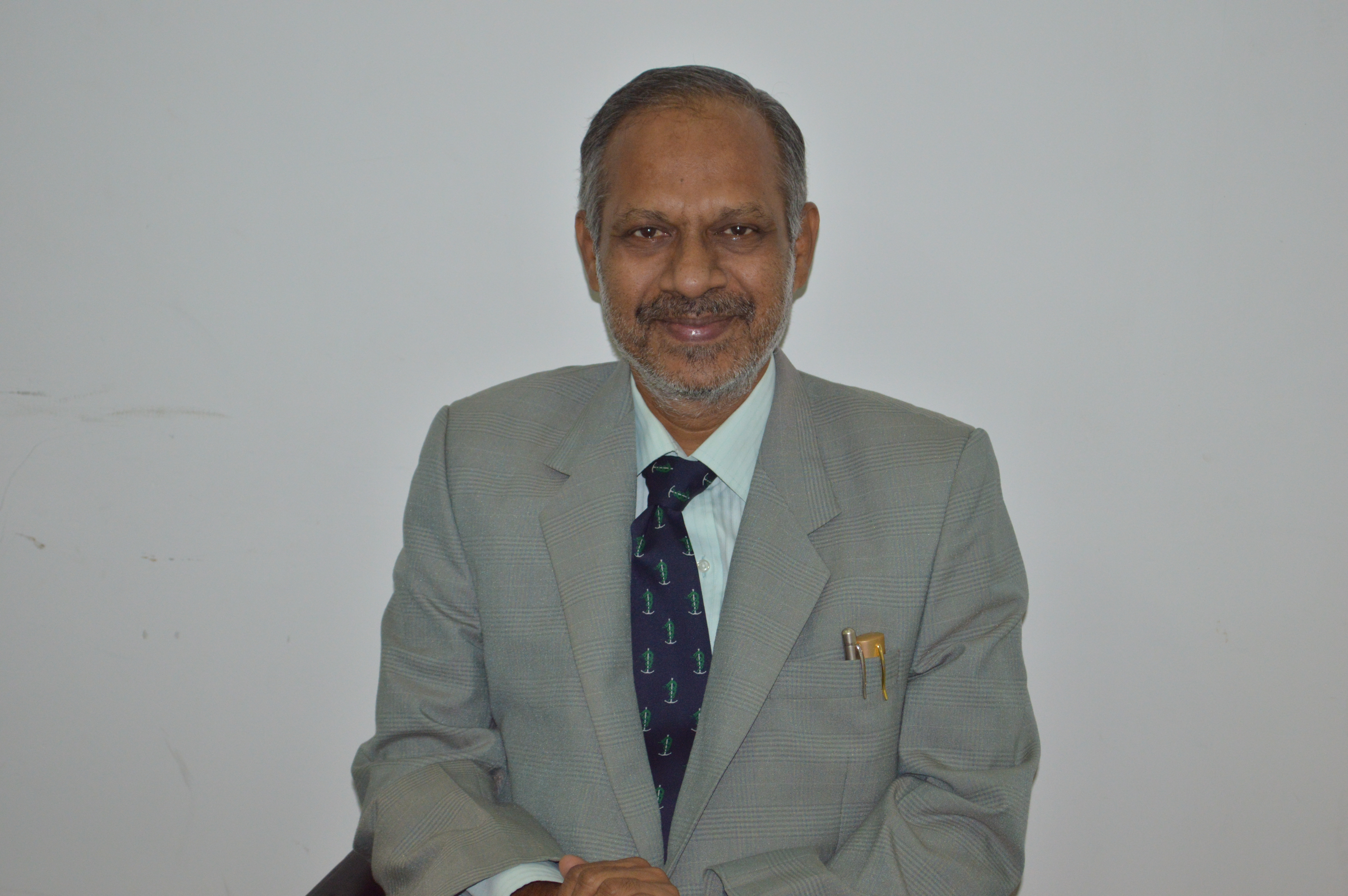
- Born: 1 January 1953 (age 73); Peralam, Tamil Nadu
- Education: Madras Medical College; University of Nottingham
- Known for: Reproductive medicine In-vitro fertilization Andrology
- Scientific career
- Workplaces: Madras Medical College; University of Nottingham; Apollo Hospitals; Chettinad Health City

N. Pandiyan (Natarajan Pandiyan) is an Indian physician and academic who is the Chief consultant of Andrology and Reproductive Medicine, Head of the Department of Reproductive Medicine at Chettinad Health City, in Kelambakkam, Tamil Nadu, in India.

Pandiyan is also the founder of the International Fertility Research Foundation (IFReF), a not for profit organization that promotes research and an evidence-based management of infertility.

In 1993, Pandiyan was considered as one of the only about ten gynaecologists in the world trained in the medical, surgical and Assisted Reproductive technology (A.R.T) management of infertile men and women

== Background ==
A native of Peralam, Tamil Nadu, he was born to Neyyadupakkam Duraiswamy Natarajan and Thilakam Natarajan on 1 January 1953.

Pandiyan obtained his M.B.B.S from Madras Medical College in 1977. Following graduation he obtained his Diploma in OBS-GYN in 1979 followed by M.D in 1980 and M.N.A.M.S from the same institute in 1981. He stood university first during his postgraduate training and won several academic medical prizes throughout his post-graduation.

Pandiyan was appointed assistant professor at the Institute of Obstetrics and Gynecology, Government Hospital for Women and Children, Egmore, Chennai.

== Academics ==
Pandiyan started the first infertility clinic in 1983 at the Institute of Obstetrics and Gynecology. A Commonwealth scholarship took him to U.K, where he trained under Professor Anne Jequier at the University Hospital, Nottingham.

Pandiyan's research interestz included culture of rat Sertoli Cells, GnRH pump therapy for inducing ovulation in women presenting with amenorrhea, the use of Computer assisted semen analysis (CASA) and the clinical management of male and female infertility. Upon completing his Postdoctoral Fellowship in Andrology and Reproductive Sciences in 1987, he undertook Andrological microsurgical training at the Clinical Research Centre, Northwick Park Hospital, London under Professor Green and Dr. Sherman Silber in St Louis, US.

== Career highlights ==
Upon returning to India Pandiyan started the first joint male and female infertility clinic in 1987 at Government General Hospital and Madras Medical College. His team established the IVF unit at Apollo hospitals, Chennai in 1988. He was appointed as the Chief Consultant in Andrology and Reproductive Sciences, Apollo hospitals, a position he held from 1997-2005.

In the year 2000, Pandiyan was invited by Robert Edwards to join the editorial board of Reproductive BioMedicine (RBM) Online. Between 2005 and 2007, Pandiyan served as a Consultant in Andrology, Reproductive Medicine, Obstetrics and gynaecology and Head of the department of Obstetrics and Gynaecology, Jerudong Park Medical centre, Jerudong park, Brunei Darussalam. From August 2007 till date, he has been attached to Chettinad Health City, where he established the Department Of Reproductive Medicine, here patients presenting with infertility are treated using IVF/ICSI and other A.R.T .

Pandiyan has helped in the establishment and running of Infertility/IVF clinics at Kanchipuram, Vijayawada, Rajahmundhry, Nellore, Bangalore, Coimbatore, Erode, Colombo, Sri Lanka and Brunei.

== Career achievements ==
- First semen Bank in India January, 1988
- First IVF twins with frozen spermatozoa in Asia –Nov 1992.
- First world report on Cryopreservation of Epididymal spermatozoa-Sep 1993.
- First world report on ‘Cryopreservation of testicular tissue’ and its superiority over ‘Cryopreservation of spermatozoa recovered from the testicular tissue.’ –1997.
- Reported a new ‘Non invasive technique of sperm retrieval from the bladder in retrograde ejaculation.’-1998.
- Reported a new technique of ‘Vasal sperm aspiration in situational anejacualtion.’-1999.
- Editor and contributor in 'Handbook of Andrology'- March 1999
- Interviewed by BBC Radio, London on the programme 'Science in action'.
- Featured in Millennium edition of Marquis Who is Who
- Life Time achievement Award from The Tamil Nadu Dr MGR Medical University on 5 September 2012.
- Established the 'Chettinad Health City Medical Journal', to support original research in medicine and medicine related technology.

== Contribution to science and education ==
Pandiyan has published more than 50 papers in peer reviewed journals, presented more than 300 papers in national and international conferences.

Pandiyan is a member of the PhD screening committee and governing council of the Tamil Nadu Dr. M.G.R Medical University, he has trained more than 50 clinicians from all over India, including neighboring countries. He is also an expert committee member at the Indian Council of Medical Research and member at several task-force meetings.
