= K. Ugrapandian =

Indian politician

K. Ugrapandian was an Indian politician and former Member of the Legislative Assembly of Tamil Nadu. He was elected to the Tamil Nadu Legislative Assembly as an Anna Dravida Munnetra Kazhagam candidate from Paramakudi constituency in 1977 election.
