= Kenoth G. Adiyodi =

Indian zoologist

Kenoth Govindan Adiyodi
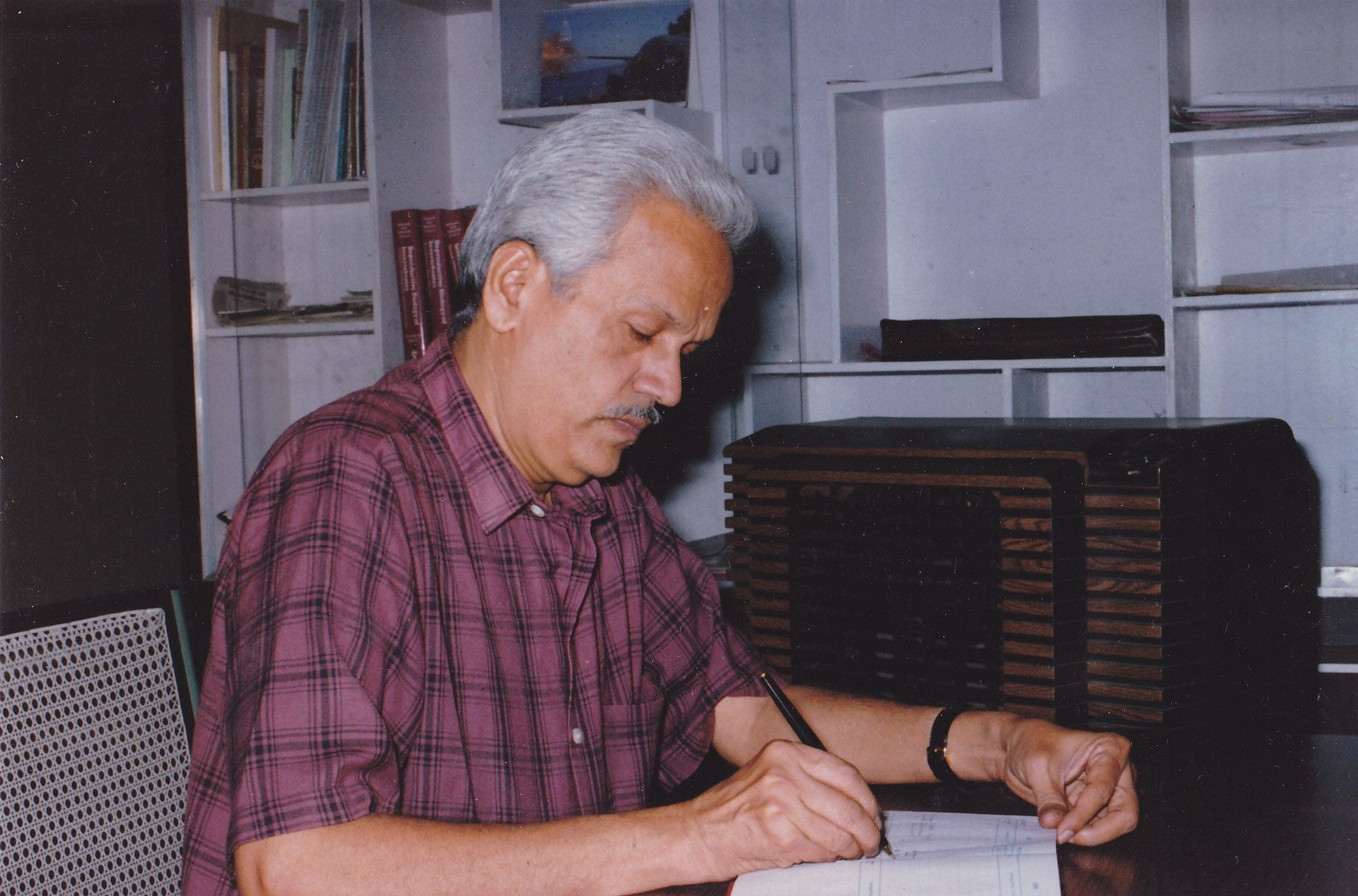
- K. G. Adiyodi in 1995
- Born: 12 January 1937; Peralam, North Malabar (present-day Peralam, Kannur District, Kerala, India)
- Died: 28 May 2001 (aged 63); New Delhi, India
- Education: Madras Christian College, Kerala University

Kenoth Govindan Adiyodi (12 January 1937 – 28 May 2001) was an Indian zoologist, author, and administrator. He was a member of the Union Public Service Commission of India (UPSC) at the time of his death in 2001.

K. G. Adiyodi's scientific achievements include founding the International Society for Invertebrate Reproduction, launching the Society's International Journal of Invertebrate Reproduction, and publishing a 12 volume, 18 book treatise titled Reproductive Biology of Invertebrates with his wife and former Rhodes Visiting Fellow, Rita G. Adiyodi.

K. G. Adiyodi served as Vice Chancellor of Cochin University of Science and Technology and as Dean of Faculty of Science, University of Calicut.

== Life and career ==
=== Early life and education ===
Kenoth Govindan Adiyodi was born in 1937 at Karivelloor, Peralam, a village in the Kannur District of Kerala State, to Kavil Kambrath Govinda Poduval and Kenoth Lakshmi Pillayathiri Amma. After his initial schooling at Payyanur, he completed his Intermediate (Pre-University) from St. Aloysius College, Mangalore in 1955 and graduated with a B.Sc. (Hons) in Zoology from Madras Christian College in 1958. He completed his MA from University of Madras. He moved to Thiruvananthapuram in 1964 to work on a research project funded by the Ford Foundation and was awarded a doctorate degree by Kerala University in 1970 for his work on Insect Neuroendocrinology under the supervision of K. K. Nayar.

=== Career ===
Adiyodi began his teaching career as lecturer at St. Agnes College, Karnataka University, Mangalore (1958–1959). He was also Lecturer at St. Joseph's College, Devagiri (1959–1964).

Adiyodi joined University of Calicut in 1970 where he served as Reader in Zoology (1970 to 1977), Professor of Invertebrate Reproductive Physiology (1977 to 1994), and Dean of Faculty of Science (1988 to 1991).

Adiyodi was Vice-Chancellor, Cochin University of Science and Technology (1994–1996) and was the first Malayali to serve as a member of the Union Public Service Commission of India (1996–2001).

=== Academic achievements ===
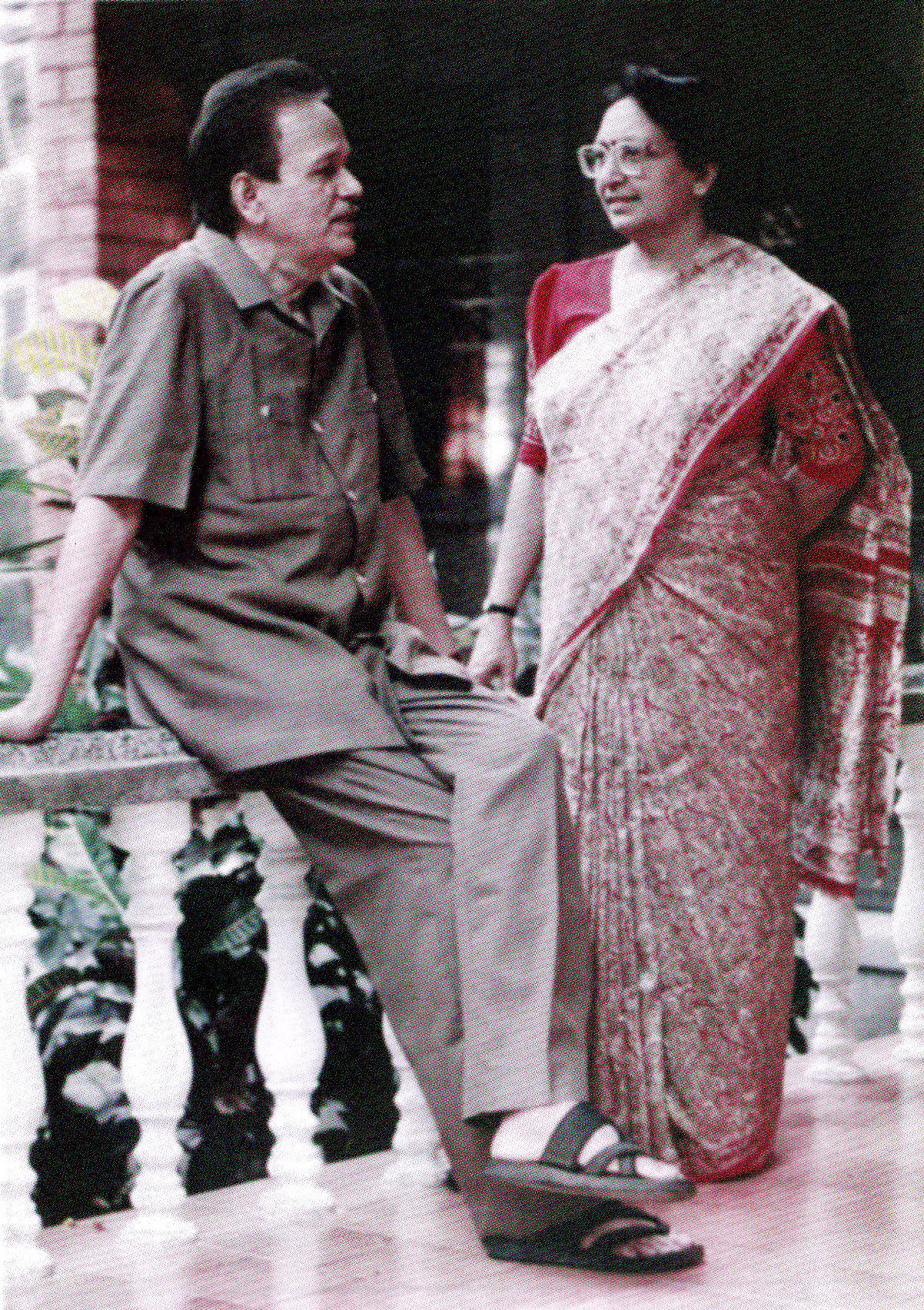
K. G. Adiyodi and Rita G. Adiyodi.

Adiyodi began his research career in insect physiology. His research interests turned to crustacean reproduction and growth after his marriage to Rita Gomez in 1966 who was then doing research work on growth, regeneration, and reproduction in land crabs. Adiyodi published in many international journals including Journal of Insect Physiology, Journal of Morphology, Biological Bulletin, General & Comparative Endocrinology, and Experientia (now Cellular and Molecular Life Sciences). His work “Endocrine Control of Reproduction in Decapod Crustacea” published in Biological Reviews, Cambridge Philosophical Society (1970) was a notable landmark in his scientific career.

=== International Society for Invertebrate Reproduction ===
It was while attending an international conference on comparative endocrinology in London in the early 1970s that K. G. Adiyodi felt the need to bring all areas of invertebrate reproductive biology into a comprehensive discipline of its own. Until then, studies on comparative endocrinology were mostly on vertebrates. His discussions with many like-minded participants at the London conference motivated him to take the initial steps to organize an international symposium dedicated to invertebrate reproduction.

The first International Symposium on Reproductive Physiology of Invertebrates (ISIR) was organised by K. G. Adiyodi and Rita G. Adiyodi at University of Calicut (1975). The International Society for Invertebrate Reproduction was founded at the Calicut symposium and ISIR was recognized as the first international symposium organized by the Society. Advances in Invertebrate Reproduction (Vol.I) published in 1977 was based on proceedings of the inaugural symposium.

The International Society of Invertebrate Reproduction held its second symposium at University of California, Davis (1978) where Adiyodi was honoured with an honorary plaque as the Society's Founder. K. G. Adiyodi was Founder Secretary General of the Society from 1975 to 1986. The Society later expanded its scope to include invertebrate development and renamed itself as the International Society of Invertebrate Reproduction and Development. The Society's meetings are now called the International Congress of Invertebrate Reproduction and Development (ICIRD).

=== International Journal for ISIR ===
The Adiyodis moved to University of Oxford when Rita Adiyodi won the Rhodes Visiting Fellowship in 1976 and K. G. Adiyodi joined her on another assignment in 1977. Adiyodi started work on launching an international journal for ISIR in 1977 while at Oxford and his efforts bore fruition when Elsevier Biomedical Press, Amsterdam agreed to publish the journal after a favourable feasibility study. The journal was named International Journal of Invertebrate Reproduction and went to print in 1979. Adiyodi served as the editor-in-chief of the new publication with Prof. K. G. Davey of York University, Canada and K. C. Highnam of University of Sheffield, UK as associate editors. The journal was renamed the International Journal of Invertebrate Reproduction and Development in 1984, and then, the Invertebrate Reproduction and Development. Balaban Press, Israel later took over the publication of the journal from Elsevier Biomedical Press. Volume 41, Numbers 1-3 (September 2002) issue of this journal, published by Balaban Press was dedicated to the memory of Adiyodi. The journal is currently published by Taylor & Francis.

=== Reproductive Biology of Invertebrates (RBI) – a multi-volume treatise ===
The groundwork for putting together a multi-volume treatise on the reproductive biology of invertebrates was made when the Adiyodis were at Oxford University. The treatise was originally planned in six volumes on a thematic basis. Boullin initiated this project at John Wiley & Sons, Inc. in 1978 and Stephen D. Thornton, helped with its work as Publishing Editor, Life Sciences. Volume I of the treatise was published in 1982. Some operational changes following the release of Volume II in 1983 led to the signing of a partnership with Oxford & IBH, New Delhi for the Indian Editions of the treatise from Volume III onwards. John Wiley & Sons, Inc. continued to publish the international editions. With the release of Volume VI Part B (1994), the Adiyodis completed all six planned volumes (eight books) of the original series. Subsequent volumes, collectively named as the Progress Series, were guest-edited by scientists of international standing. A total of 18 books were published in the 12 volume, RBI series, the last in 2005.

==== Titles of books in the treatise ====
- Adiyodi, K.G. and Adiyodi, R.G. (Editors) (1982) Reproductive Biology of Invertebrates, Vol. I, Oogenesis, Oviposition and Oosorption. John Wiley & Sons, Chichester, UK.
- Adiyodi, K.G. and Adiyodi, R.G. (Editors) (1983) Reproductive Biology of Invertebrates, Vol.II Spermatogenesis and Sperm Function. John Wiley & Sons, Chichester, UK.
- Adiyodi, K.G. and Adiyodi, R.G. (Editors) (1988) Reproductive Biology of Invertebrates, Vol..III, Accessory Sex Glands. John Wiley & Sons, Chichester, UK and Oxford & IBH Publishing Company, New Delhi.
- Adiyodi, K.G. and Adiyodi, R.G. (Editors) (1989) Reproductive Biology of Invertebrates, Vol.IV Part A Fertilization, Development and Parental Care. John Wiley & Sons, Chichester, UK and Oxford & IBH Publishing Company, New Delhi.
- Adiyodi, K.G. and Adiyodi, R.G. (Editors) (1990) Reproductive Biology of Invertebrates, Vol.IV Part B Fertilization, Development and Parental Care. John Wiley & Sons, Chichester, UK .and Oxford & IBH Publishing Company, New Delhi.
- Adiyodi, K.G. and Adiyodi, R.G. (Editors) (1992) Reproductive Biology of Invertebrates, Vol.V Sexual Differentiation & Behaviour. John Wiley & Sons, Chichester, UK and Oxford & IBH Publishing Company, New Delhi.
- Adiyodi, K.G. and Adiyodi, R.G. (Editors) (1993) Reproductive Biology of Invertebrates, Vol.VI Part A. Asexual Propagation and Reproductive Strategies. John Wiley & Sons, Chichester, UK and Oxford & IBH Publishing Company, New Delhi.
- Adiyodi, K.G. and Adiyodi, R.G. (Editors) (1994) Reproductive Biology of Invertebrates, Vol. VI Part B. Asexual Propagation and Reproductive Strategies. John Wiley & Sons, Chichester, UK and Oxford & IBH Publishing Company, New Delhi.
- Adiyodi, K.G. and Adiyodi, R.G. (Series Editors) J. R. Collier (Volume Editor) (1997) Reproductive Biology of Invertebrates, Vol. VII Progress in Developmental Biology. John Wiley & Sons, Chichester, UK and Oxford & IBH Publishing Company, New Delhi.
- Adiyodi, K.G. and Adiyodi, R.G. (Series Editors) T. S. Adams (Volume Editor) (1997) Reproductive Biology of Invertebrates, Vol. VIII Progress in Reproductive Endocrinology. John Wiley & Sons, Chichester, UK and Oxford & IBH Publishing Company, New Delhi.
- Adiyodi, K.G. and Adiyodi, R.G. (Series Editors) B. G. M. Jamieson (Volume Editor) (1999) Reproductive Biology of Invertebrates, Vol. IX Part A. Progress in Male Gamete Ultrastructure and Phylogeny. John Wiley & Sons, Chichester, UK and Oxford & IBH Publishing Company, New Delhi.
- Adiyodi, K.G. and Adiyodi, R.G. (Series Editors) B. G. M. Jamieson (Volume Editor) (2000) Reproductive Biology of Invertebrates, Vol.IX Part B. Progress in Male Gamete Ultrastructure and Phylogeny. John Wiley & Sons, Chichester, U. K. and Oxford & IBH Publishing Company, New Delhi.
- Adiyodi, K.G. and Adiyodi, R.G. (Series Editors) B.G.M. Jamieson (Volume Editor) (2000) Reproductive Biology of Invertebrates, Vol.IX Part C. Progress in Male Gamete Ultrastructure and Phylogeny. John Wiley & Sons, Chichester, UK and Oxford & IBH Publishing Company, New Delhi.
- Adiyodi, K.G. and Adiyodi, R.G. (Series Editors) August Dorn (Volume Editor) (2000) Reproductive Biology of Invertebrates, Vol.X Part A. Progress in Developmental Endocrinology. John Wiley & Sons, Chichester, UK and Oxford & IBH Publishing Company, New Delhi.
- Adiyodi, K.G. and Adiyodi, R.G. (Series Editors) August Dorn (Volume Editor) (2000) Reproductive Biology of Invertebrates, Vol. X Part B. Progress in Developmental Endocrinology. John Wiley & Sons, Chichester, UK and Oxford & IBH Publishing Company, New Delhi.
- Adiyodi, K.G. and Adiyodi, R.G. (Series Editors) Roger N. Hughes (Volume Editor) (2002) Reproductive Biology of Invertebrates, Vol.XI Progress in Asexual Reproduction. John Wiley & Sons, Chichester, UK and Oxford & IBH Publishing Company, New Delhi.
- Adiyodi, K.G. and Adiyodi, R.G. (Series Editors) Alexander S. Raikhel and Thomas W. Sappington (Volume Editors) (2002) Reproductive Biology of Invertebrates, Vol.XII Part A. Progress in Vitellogenesis. Science Publishers, Inc., Enfield, USA and Plymouth, UK.
- Adiyodi, K.G. and Adiyodi, R.G. (Series Editors) A. S. Raikhel (Volume Editor) (2005) Reproductive Biology of Invertebrates, Vol.XII Part B. Progress in Vitellogenesis. CRC Press, Taylor and Francis Group.

=== Popular scientific literature ===
Adiyodi was the Founder Secretary of the Kerala Sastra Sahitya Parishad, a not-for-profit organization and one of India's largest popular science organizations. He also served as the President of Deseeya Sastra Vedi (National Science Forum), a similar organization.

Adiyodi was a prolific writer in English and Malayalam. His first book Theyyavum Thirayum was published when he was an intermediate student. Jeevante Udbhavavum Bhaviyum won him the M.P. Paul Prize in 1965. Adiyodi's Keralathile Vishapambukal, a book on the poisonous snakes of Kerala was published in the weekly edition of Mathrubhumi in the early 1960s. Pradhamika Janthusastram written for teaching zoology at the undergraduate level was published by the Kerala Sahitya Academy in 1967.

=== Vice-Chancellor of Cochin University of Science & Technology ===
Adiyodi served as Vice-Chancellor of Cochin University of Science and Technology from 1994 to 1996. Collaborative partnerships in teaching and research with reputed universities around the world during this time helped bring Cochin University into national and international focus. Adiyodi secured the prestigious MHO-Partnership Programme of the Government of Netherlands for CUSAT which allowed the university to receive financial grants from the Dutch government. The Dutch government selects one University from each partner country.

=== Leadership roles ===
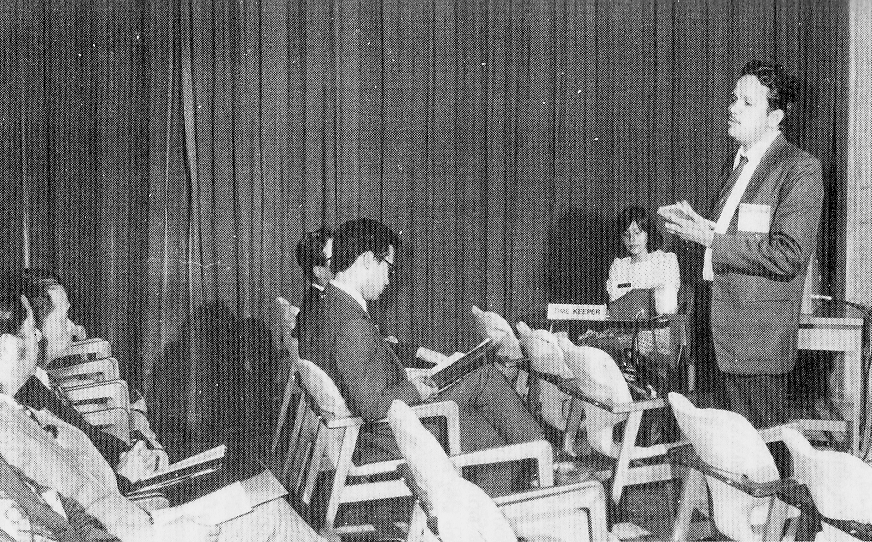
K. G. Adiyodi speaking at the International Congress of Histochemistry and Cytochemistry in Kyoto, Japan, 1972.

Adiyodi served in various leadership roles, some of which are listed below:

- Founder Secretary General, International Society of Invertebrate Reproduction, Tubingen, Germany (1975-1986)
- Founder President, Indian Society of Invertebrate Reproduction (1978-1986)
- Vice-President, Indian Society of Comparative Endocrinology, 1974
- Vice-President, Indian Society of Comparative Animal Physiology, 1994
- President, Calicut University Teachers Association
- Founder and Founder Secretary, Kerala Sastra Sahitya Parishad (1962-1965)
- President, Desiya Sastra Vedi (1986-1994)
- President, Kerala Biotechnology Consortium, 1995
- Member, Science, Technology and Environment Committee of the Govt. of Kerala, 1993
- Member, Environment Research Council, Govt. of Kerala, 1993
- Chairman/Member of several other statutory committees of Govt. of Kerala
- Advisor, Swadeshi Science Movement of Kerala
- Member, Governing Council, Nuclear Centre (UGC), New Delhi, 1996
- Member, Board of studies in Engineering, AICTE, New Delhi (1994 to 1996)

=== Visiting assignments ===
- Visiting scientist/Professor, University of Oxford, 1973, 1977-1978
- Guest scientist at Koln (1973) and Paris (1973) Universities
- Lectured at various Universities, chaired sessions at several international conferences and symposia in Japan, USA, and the EU.

== Recognition & awards ==
- Hon. Member (Fellow) of the International Society of Invertebrate Reproduction, Nagoya, Japan, 1988
- Invited to be active member, New York Academy of Sciences, 1993
- M.P. Paul Prize for the best science book in Malayalam, 1965
- ISIR International Foundation Award, 1979

== Notable publications ==
- Adiyodi, K.G. (Editor-in-Chief) (1979). International Journal of Invertebrate Reproduction, Vol.I, Numbers 1 to 6. Elsevier Biomedical Press, Amsterdam and New York.
- Adiyodi, K.G. (Editor-in-Chief) (1980). International Journal of Invertebrate Reproduction, Vol.II, Numbers 1 to 6. Elsevier Biomedical Press, Amsterdam and New York.
- Adiyodi, K.G. (Editor-in-Chief) (1981). International Journal of Invertebrate Reproduction, Vol III, Numbers 1 to 6 and Vol IV, Numbers 1 to 3. Elsevier Biomedical Press, Amsterdam and New York.
- Adiyodi, K.G. (Editor-in-Chief) (1982). International Journal of Invertebrate Reproduction, Vol.VI, Numbers 4 to 6 and Vol. V, Numbers 1 to 6. Elsevier Biomedical Press, Amsterdam and New York.
- Adiyodi, K.G., and Adiyodi, R.G.(Editors) (1975). Invertebrate Reproduction. Publication Division, ISIR Secretariat, Calicut University.
- Adiyodi, K.G., and Adiyodi, R.G.(Editors) (1977). Advances in Invertebrate Reproduction, Vol.I Proceedings of the First International Symposium on Invertebrate Reproduction. Peralam Kenoth, Karivellur.
- Bell, W.J., and Adiyodi, K.G.(Editors) (1982). The American Cockroach. Chapman and Hall, London.
- Adiyodi, K.G. (1973). “Functional morphology of the cephalic neuroendocrine complex of two species of Blattidae: an in situ study”, in Neurosecretion: The Final Neuroendocrine Pathway (Eds. F. Knowles and L. Vollrath), Springer-Verlag, Berlin.
- Adiyodi, K.G. (1974). “Post cerebral neuroendocrine complex of the blaberid cockroaches, Nauphoeta cinerea (Olivier) and Trichoblatta sericea (Saussure): An in situ study”, Marathwada Univ. J. Sci., 13, 87-102 (Symp. Comp.Endocrinol, Aurangabad, p.8).
- Adiyodi, K.G. (1974). Extracerebral cephalic neuroendocrine complex of the blattids, Periplaneta americana (L.) and Neostylopyga rhombifolia (Stoll): An in situ study, J. Morphol.,144,469-484.
- Adiyodi, K.G. (1975). Comparative physiology of invertebrates, Ann. Rev. Zool.,2,58-79.
- Adiyodi, K.G. (1976). Integration within the neuroendocrine control systems in arthropods, Plenary Lecture, IV All India Symp.Comp. Endocrinol., Mysore.
- Adiyodi, K.G. (1976) - Neuroendocrine influences in reproduction in invertebrates, Plenary Lecture, Gen. Comp. Endocrinol. Symp., New Delhi.
- Adiyodi, K.G. (1977). New Perspectives and Challenges, in Advances in Invertebrate Reproduction (Editors Adiyodi K.G. and Adiyodi R.G.), Vol.I, Peralam-Kenoth, Karivellur, pp. 1-3.
- Adiyodi, K.G. (1982). Some thoughts on the evolution of "reproductive" hormones in invertebrates, in Progress in Invertebrate Reproduction and Aquaculture (Eds. T. Subramoniam and S. Varadarajan), Indian Society of Invertebrate Reproduction, Madras, pp.89-93.
- Adiyodi, K.G. (1983). Accessory sex glands in annelids, Second All India Symp. Inv. Reprod. and Nat. Sem. Recent Trends in Entomol. Res., Calcutta, p.1.
- Adiyodi, K.G. (1988). Annelida, in Reproductive Biology of Invertebrates, Vol.III. Accessory Sex Glands (Eds. Adiyodi, K.G. and Adiyodi, R.G.), Wiley (Interscience), Chichester and New York and Oxford & IBH, New Delhi, pp.189-250.
- Adiyodi, K.G. (1993) Endocrine control of carbohydrate metabolism in arthropods, Contemporary Zoology
- Adiyodi, K.G., and Adiyodi, R.G. (1970). Peroxidase isozymes in the conglobate gland of male cockroaches, Periplaneta americana, Indian J.Exp. Biol.,8,55-56.
- Adiyodi, K. G., and Adiyodi, R.G. (1970). Endocrine control of reproduction in decapod Crustacea, Biol. Rev., Cambridge Phil.Soc., 45, 121-165.
- Adiyodi, K.G., and Adiyodi, R.G. (1972). Soluble proteins in the haemocytes, midgut and hepatic caeca of adult female Periplaneta americana (L.), J. Kerala Acad.Biol., 3, 7-11.
- Adiyodi, K.G., and Adiyodi, R.G. (1972). Plasma proteins of male American cockroaches during the larval-adult transformation, Indian J. exp. Biol.,10, 189-192.
- Adiyodi, K.G., and Adiyodi, R.G. (1972). Lipids in the accessory sex gland complex of adult male American cockroaches, in Histochemistry and Cytochemistry (Proc. IV Internatl. Congr.Histochem. Cytochem., Japan), (Eds. T. Takeuchi, K. Ogawa, and S. Fujita), p.255.
- Adiyodi, K.G., and Adiyodi, R.G. (1974). Some structural evidence in support of functional integration within the cephalic neuroendocrine complex of Periplaneta americana (L.), Experientia, 30,805-807.
- Adiyodi, K. G., and Adiyodi, R.G. (1974). Social influence in arthropod reproduction: A review, Satellite Symp. Endrocrines and Pheromones, Trivandrum.
- Adiyodi, K.G., and Adiyodi, R.G. (1974). Control mechanisms in cockroach reproduction, J. Sci. Indust. Res., 33,343-358.
- Adiyodi, K.G., and Adiyodi, R.G. (1974) - Comparative physiology of reproduction in arthropods, in Comparative Physiology and Biochemistry (Ed. O. Lowenstein), Vol.5, Academic Press, New York, pp. 37-107.
- Adiyodi, K.G., and Adiyodi, R.G. (1975). Morphology and cytology of accessory sex glands in invertebrates, in International Review of Cytology (Eds. G.H. Bourne, J.F. Danielli, and K.W. Jeon), Vol 43, Academic Press, New York, pp.353-398.
- Adiyodi, K.G., and Adiyodi, R.G. (1985). Reproduction vs. growth: Endocrine programming in the Brachyura, in Current trends in Comparative Endocrinology (Eds. B. Lofts and W.N. Holmes), Hong Kong University Press, Hong Kong, pp.313-315.
- Adiyodi, K.G., Adiyodi, R.G., and Brunet, P.C.J. (1978) - Programming of the production of indoxyl sulphatase in the male dermal glands of Periplaneta americana (L.), Proc. VIII Internatl. Symp. Comp.Endocrinol., Amsterdam, p.3.
- Adiyodi, K.G., Adiyodi, R.G., and Sudha, C.K. (1976). Histochemistry and histophysiology of the hepatopancreas of the scorpion, Palamnaeus scaber, V Internatl. Congr. Histochem. Cytochem., Bucharest, Romania.
- Adiyodi, K.G., Adiyodi, R.G., and Sudha, C.K. (1978). Changes in the hepatopancreas of the scorpion, Palamnaeus scaber in relation to the ovarian cycle, IV All India Symp. Comp. Anim. Physiol. Endocrinol., Tirupati, p.40
- Adiyodi, K.G., and Anilkumar, G. (1988). Arthropoda-Crustacea, in Reproductive Biology of Invertebrates, Vol. III. Accessory Sex Glands (Editors Adiyodi K.G. and Adiyodi R.G.), Wiley (Interscience), Chichester and New York and Oxford & IBH, New Delhi, pp.261-318.
- Adiyodi, R.G., and Adiyodi, K.G. (1970). Lipid metabolism in relation to reproduction and moulting in the crab, Paratelphusa hydrodromous (Herbst): Phospholipids and reproduction, Indian J. exp. Biol., 8, 222-223.
- Adiyodi, R.G., and Adiyodi, K.G. (1971). Sustained neurosecretory activity in the brain implants in Paratelphusa hydrodromous (Herbst). J. Kerala Acad. Biol., 3, 48-50.
- Adiyodi, R.G., and Adiyodi, K.G. (1971) - Lipid metabolism in relation to reproduction and moulting in the crab, Paratelphusa hydrodromous (Herbst): Cholesterol and unsaturated fatty acids, Indian J. exp. Biol., 9,514-515.
- Adiyodi, R.G., and Adiyodi, K.G. (1972). Hepatopancreas of Paratelphusa hydrodromous (Herbst): Histophysiology and the pattern of proteins in relation to reproduction and moult, Biol. Bull., mar. biol. Lab., Woods Hole, 142, 359-369.
- Adiyodi, R.G., and Adiyodi, K.G. (1972). Histochemistry of the integumentary connective tissue of a crab in relation to the moult cycle, in Histochemistry and Cytochemistry 1972 (Proc. IV Internatl. Cong. Histochem. Cytochem., Japan), (Eds. T. Takeuchi, K. Ogawa, and S. Fujita), p.545.
- Adiyodi, R.G., and Adiyodi, K.G. (1973). Moult-related neuroendocrine events in the crab, Paratelphusa hydrodromous, in Neurosecretion: The Final Neuroendocrine Pathway (Eds.F. Knowles and L. Vollrath), Springer-Verlag, Berlin, p.294.
- Adiyodi, R.G., and Adiyodi, K.G. (1974). Ultrastructure of the utriculi majores in the mushroom-shaped male accessory gland of Periplaneta americana (L.), Z. Zellforsch., 147,433-440.
- Adiyodi, R.G., and Adiyodi, K.G. (1976). Seasonal changes in the activity of the androgenic gland of the crab, Paratelphusa hydrodromous (Herbst), IV All India Symp. Comp. Endocrinol., Mysore, P.1.
- Adiyodi, R.G., and Subramoniam, T. (1983). Arthropoda-Crustacea, in Reproductive Biology of Invertebrates, Vol.I. Oogenesis, Oviposition and Oosorption (Eds. K. G. Adiyodi and R.G. Adiyodi), Wiley (Interscience), Chichester and New York, pp.443-495.
- Anilkumar, G., and Adiyodi, K.G. (1975) - Histochemical and histophysiological studies on the spermatheca of the freshwater crab, Paratelphusa hydrodromous (Herbst) in relation to the ovarian cycle, Proc. First Internatl. Symp. Inv., Calicut University, pp.45-46.
- Anilkumar, G., and Adiyodi, K.G. (1976). Fluctuations in the hepatopancreatic reserves of the edible freshwater crab, Paratelphusa hydrodromous (Herbst) in relation to ovarian growth, Second All India Symp.Anim. Physiol., Nagpur.
- Anilkumar, G., and Adiyodi, K.G. (1976). Histology and histochemistry of the hepatopancreas of the freshwater crab, Paratelphusa hydrodromous, Proc. V Internatl. Congr. Histochem. Cytochem., Bucharest, Romania.
- Anilkumar, G., and Adiyodi, K.G. (1976). A quantitative study of the lipids in the hepatopancreas and ovary of the freshwater crab, Paratelphusa hydrodromous in relation to ovarian growth, Proc. II All India Symp. Comp. Anim. Physiol., Nagpur.
- Anilkumar, G., and Adiyodi, K.G. (1977). Spermatheca of the freshwater crab, Paratelphusa hydrodromous in relation to ovarian cycle, in Advances in Invertebrate Reproduction (Eds. K.G. Adiyodi and R.G. Adiyodi), Vol.I, Peralam-Kenoth, Karivellur, pp.269-274.
- Anilkumar, G., and Adiyodi, K.G. (1978). The reproductive cycle of the freshwater crab, Paratelphusa hydrodromous (Herbst), IV All India Symp. Comp. Anim. Physiol. Endocrinol., Sri Venkateswara University, Tirupati, p.97.
- Anilkumar, G., and Adiyodi, K.G. (1979). Ovarian growth induced by eyestalk ablation during the pre-breeding season is not normal in the crab, Paratelphusa hydrodromous (Herbst), Proc. II Internatl. Symp. Inv. Reprod., in Advances in Invertebrate Reproduction, Vol. II (Eds. W. H. Clark Jr. and T. S. Adams), Elsevier Biomedical Press, New York, p.358 (abstract).
- Anilkumar, G., and Adiyodi, K.G. (1979). Effect of eyestalk ablation on hepatopancreatic reserves in Paratelphusa hydrodromous, All India Workshop Crust. Reprod. Biol., Calicut University, pp.27-28.
- Anilkumar, G., and Adiyodi, K.G. (1980). Some observations on accelerated vitellogenesis induced by eyestalk ablation in the crab, Paratelphusa hydrodromous (Herbst), First All India Symp.Invert. Reprod., Madras, p.3.
- Anilkumar, G., and Adiyodi, K.G. (1980). Ovarian growth, induced by eyestalk ablation during the pre-breeding season, is not normal in the crab, Paratelphusa hydrodromous (Herbst), Internatl. J. Inv.Reprod., 2, 95-105.
- Anilkumar, G., and Adiyodi, K.G. (1983). Fluctuations in hepatopancreatic reserves of the edible freshwater crab, Paratelphusa hydrodromous (Herbst) in relation to ovarian growth, First Internatl. Biennial Conf. Warm Water Aquacult Crustacea, Hawaii, p.14.
- Anilkumar, G., and Adiyodi, K.G. (1983). Changes in the haemolymph organic constituents of the freshwater crab, Paratelphusa hydrodromous in relation to reproduction and moult, Second All India Symp. Inv. Reprod. and Nat. Sem. Trends in Entomol.Res., Calcutta, pp.15-16.
- Anilkumar, G., and Adiyodi, K.G. (1983)- Reproductive strategies of two populations of the freshwater crab, Paratelphusa hydrodromous (Herbst), Third International. Symposium. Inv. Reprod., Tubingen, West Germany, p.2.
- Anilkumar, G., and Adiyodi, K.G. (1985). The role of eyestalk hormones in vitellogenesis during the breeding season in the crab, Paratelphusa hydrodromous (Herbst), Biol. Bull. mar. Biol. Lab., Woods Hole, 169,689-695.
- Anilkumar, G., and Adiyodi, K.G. (1986). Induced ovarian growth by eyestalk ablation in the crab, Paratelphusa hydrodromous (Herbst): Physiology of the haemolymph, IV Internatl. Symp. Inv. Reprod., Lille, France, p.50.
- Anilkumar, G., Adiyodi, K.G., and Adiyodi, R.G. (1981). Induced ovarian growth under bilateral and unilateral eyestalk ablation in the crab, Paratelphusa hydrodromous (Herbst), UK Mtg.Internatl. Soc. Inv. Reprod., Newcastle, U.K., p.2.
- Bell, W.J., and Adiyodi, K.G. (1982). Reproduction, in The American Cockroach (Eds. W.J. Bell and K.G. Adiyodi), Chapmam and Hall, London, pp.343-370.
- Gupta, S.N.V., and Adiyodi, K.G. (1983). Dietary value of crab meat, First Internatl. Biennial Cong. Warm water Aquacult. Crustacea, Hawaii, p.57.
- Gupta, S.N.V., and Adiyodi, K.G. (1992). Studies on utilisation of yolk for embryogenesis in the freshwater crab, Paratelphusa hydrodromous (Herbst). XIV Annual Conf. Indian Soc. Comp. Anim. Physiol., Calicut University, p.45.
- Gupta, S.N.V., and Adiyodi, K.G. (1992). Organic composition of the meat of the freshwater crab, Paratelphusa hydrodromous (Herbst), J. Zool. Soc. Kerala, 2(1), 25-30.
- Gupta, S.N.V., Kurup, K.N.P., Adiyodi, R.G., and Adiyodi, K.G. (1987). The antagonism between somatic growth and ovarian growth during different phases in intermoult (Stage C4) in sexually mature freshwater crab, Paratelphusa hydrodromous, Internatl. J. Inv.Reprod. Dev., 12, 307-318.
- Gupta, S.N.V., Kurup, K.N.P., Adiyodi, R.G., and Adiyodi, K.G. (1989). The antagonism between somatic growth and testicular activity during different phases in intermoult (Stage C4) in sexually mature freshwater crab, Paratelphusa hydrodromous, Inv. Reprod. Dev., 16,195-204.
- Janardanan, K.P., and Adiyodi, K.G. (1980). Histophysiology of the prostate gland of the earthworm, Megoscolex sp., V All India Symp. Comp. Anim. Physiol., Pune, pp.24-25.
- Krishnakumar, R., and Adiyodi, K.G. (1980). Endocrine control of spermathecal activity in the crab, Paratelphusa hydrodromous (Herbst), First All India Symp. Inv. Reprod., Madras, p.4.
- Krishnakumar, R., and Adiyodi, K.G. (1981). Spermatheca of the crab, Paratelphusa hydrodromous (Herbst): Mechanisms controlling its activity, U.K. Mtg. Internatl. Soc. Inv. Reprod., Newcastle, UK, p.38.
- Krishnakumar, R., and Adiyodi, K.G. (1983). Seasonal and moult-related changes in major biochemical components of the spermatheca of the crab, Paratelphusa hydrodromous (Herbst), Third Internatl. Symp. Inv. Reprod., Tubingen, West Germany, p.35.
- Krishnakumar, R., and Adiyodi, K.G. (1989). Influence of mating on ovarian development in the freshwater crab, Paratelphusa hydrodromous (Herbst), Comp. Physiol. Ecol., 14, 198-201.
- Krishnakumar, R., and Adiyodi, K.G. (1992). Sexual maturation-related changes in spermatheca of the freshwater crab, Paratelphusa hydrodromous (Herbst) XIV Ann. Conf. Indian Soc. Comp. Anim. Physiol., Calicut University, p.46.
- Krishnakumar, R., Adiyodi, K.G., and Adiyodi, R.G. (1992). Spermatozoa of Paratelphusa hydrodromous (Herbst) and their viability, XIV Ann. Conf. Indian Soc. Comp. Anim. Physiol, Calicut University, p.36.
- Krishnakumar, R., Vijayalekshmi, V.R., and Adiyodi, K.G. (1979). Uptake of yolk proteins by developing crustacean oocytes as revealed by trypan blue technique, All India Workshop Crust. Reprod. Biol., Calicut University, pp.29-30.
- Mathad, S.G., and Adiyodi, K.G. (1979). On the histophysiology of the male sex duct and spermatophore formation in Paratelphusa hydrodromous, All India Workshop Crust. Reprod. Biol., Calicut University, pp.28-29.
- Mathad, S.G., and Adiyodi, K.G. (1980). Composition of semen in Barytelphusa cunicularis, First All India Symp. Inv. Reprod., Madras, p.72.
- Mathad, S.G., and Adiyodi, K.G. (1981). Endocrine control of semen production in the crab, Paratelphusa hydrodromous, First Indo-Pacific Symp. Inv. Reprod., Aurangabad, pp.43-44.
- Mathad, S.G., and Adiyodi, K.G. (1990). Changes in biochemical composition of the testis and semen during different phases of the intermoult in the freshwater crab, Paratelphusa hydrodromous (Herbst), Proc. Indian Nat. Sci. Acad.,56B,259-264.
- Mathad, S.G., and Adiyodi, K.G. (1991). Role of male genital duct in the formation of spermatophore and other seminal components in the freshwater crab, Paratelphusa hydrodromous, J. Anim. Morphol. Physiol., 38, 203-214.
- Mathad, S.G., and Adiyodi, K.G. (1992). The role of eyestalk in semen production in the freshwater crab, Paratelphusa hydrodromous (Herbst), XIV Ann. Conf. Indian Soc.Comp. Anim. Physiol., Calicut University, p.50.
- Muthuraman, AL., and Adiyodi, K.G. (1980). Histophysiology of the reproductive system of the male prawn, Penaeus indicus (H.M. Edwards), First All India Symp. Inv. Reprod., Madras, p.48.
- Muthuraman, AL., and Adiyodi, K.G. (1981). Seasonal changes in the composition of semen in the prawn, Penaeus indicus, First Indo-Pacific Symp. Inv. Reprod. Aurangabad, pp.57-58.
- Muthuraman, AL., and Adiyodi, K.G. (1983). Semen production in the Indian prawn, Penaeus indicus, First Internatl. Biennial Conf. Warm Water Aquacult. Crustacea, Hawaii, p.12.
- Muthuraman, AL., and Adiyodi, K.G. (1986). Some observations on the composition of semen in the Indian prawn, Penaeus indicus, in Indian Ocean: Biology of Benthic Marine Organisms, Techniques and Methods as Applied to the Indian Ocean (Eds. M-F Thompson, R. Sarojini, and R. Nagabhushanam) Oxford & IBH, New Delhi, pp.131-141.
- Narayanan, S., and Adiyodi, K.G. (1991). Seasonal changes in pattern of reproduction and moulting in the freshwater shrimp, Macrobrachium idella, Nat. Sem. Shrimp Seed Production and farming, Orissa.
- Radhakrishnan, C., and Adiyodi, K.G. (1977). Histochemical studies on vitellogenesis in the millipede, Jonespeltis splendidus, in Advances in Invertebrate Reproduction, Vol.I (Eds. K.G. Adiyodi and R.G. Adiyodi), Peralam-Kenoth, Karivellur, pp.193-198.
- Radhakrishnan, C., and Adiyodi, K.G. (1977). Fluctuations in the organic constituents of the body in relation to ovarian growth in the millipede, Jonespeltis splendidus (Verhoeff). Proc. II Orient. Entomol. Symp., Madras, pp.23-27.
- Radhakrishnan, C., and Adiyodi, K.G. (1978). Fat body of the millipede, Jonespeltis splendidus - Changes in relation to reproduction and moult, IV Internatl. Symp. Myriapodol., Milan (Italy), p.50.
- Raman, K., and Adiyodi, K.G. (1980). Reproductive bionomics of the freshwater crab, Paratelphusa hydrodromous (Herbst), First All India Symp. Inv. Reprod., Madras, p.27.
- Sabeeda, K.C., and Adiyodi, K.G. (1974). Composition of the spermiducal secretions of the crab, Paratelphusa drodromous (Herbst), J. Reorod. Fert., 38,244.
- Sareen, M.L., and Adiyodi, K.G. (1983). Arthropoda-Myriapoda, in Reproductive Biology on Invertebrates, Vol.I Oogenesis, Oviposition, and Oosorption (Eds. K.G. Adiyodi and R.G. Adiyodi), Wiley (Interscience), Chichester and New York, pp. 497-520.
- Sreekumar, S., Adiyodi, R.G., and Adiyodi, K.G. (1982). Aspects of semen production in Macrobrachium sp., in Giant Prawn, Developments in Aquaculture and Fisheries Sciences, Vol.10 (Ed.M.B. New), Elsevier, Amsterdam, pp.83-89.
- Sukumaran, M., and Adiyodi, K.G. (1980). Studies on semen production in Ocypode platytarsis - First All India Symp. Inv. Reprod., Madras, pp.70-71.
- Sukumaran, M., and Adiyodi, K.G. (1981). Semen of the ghost crab, Ocypode platytarsis: Composition and the role of eyestalk principles in its production, UK Mtg. Interntl. Soc. Inv. Reprod., Newcastle, U.K., p.60.
- Sukumaran, M., and Adiyodi, K.G. (1983). Eyestalk influence of semen in the ghost crab, Ocypode platytarsis, Third Interntl. Symp. Inv. Reprod., Tubingen, West Germany, p.66.
- Sukumaran, M., and Adiyodi, K.G. (1992). Semenogenesis in the ghost crab, Ocypode platytarsis: Role of accessory sex glands, XIV Ann. Conf. Indian Soc. Comp. Anim. Physiol., Calicut University, p.47.
- Vasudevan, M.P., and Adiyodi, K.G. (1981). Correlation between reproduction and moult in the freshwater shrimp, Macrobrachium idella, U. K. Mtg. Internatl. Soc. Inv. Reprod., Newcastle, U.K., p.63.
- Vijaya, B., and Adiyodi, K.G. (1990). Oogenesis and foliculogenesis in the freshwater shrimp, Macrobrachium idella, Nat. Symp. Freshw. Prawns, Kochi.
- Vijayalekshmi, V.R., and Adiyodi, K.G. (1973). Accessory sex glands of male Periplaneta americana (L.), Part-I. A qualitative analysis of some non-enzymic components, Indian J.exp. Biol., 11, 512-514.
- Vijayalekshmi, V.R., and Adiyodi, K.G. (1973). Accessory sex glands of male Periplaneta americana (L.), Part-II. Secretory behaviour and maturation of the mushroom gland complex, Indian J.exp. Biol.11,515-520.
- Vijayalekshmi, V.R., and Adiyodi, K.G. (1973) - Accessory sex glands of male Periplaneta americana (L.), Part-III. Histochemistry of the mushroom-shaped and conglobate glands, Indian J. exp. Biol., 11, 521-524.
- Vijayalekshmi, V.R., and Adiyodi, K.G. (1975). Mushroom-shaped accessory sex gland of the cockroach, Nauphoeta cinerea (Olivier). Histology and histochemistry, Proc. First Internatl. Symp. Inv. Reprod., Calicut University, p.42.
- Vijayalekshmi, V.R., and Adiyodi, K.G. (1976). Neuroendocrine changes in relation to post metamorphic sexual maturation in male Periplaneta americana (L.), Symp. Gen. Comp. Endocrinol., New Delhi.
- Vijayalekshmi, V.R., and Adiyodi, K.G. (1977). Comparative histology and histochemistry of the mushroom-shaped glands in the male accessory sex gland complex of three species of Dictyoptera, Orient. Entomol. Symp., Madras.
- Vijayalekshmi, V.R., and Adiyodi, K.G. (1983). Biochemical composition of the accessory sex gland of male Periplaneta americana, Internatl. Conf. Natural Products as Regulators of Insect Reproduction, Jammu, p.1.
- Vijayalekshmi, V.R., Adiyodi, R.G., and Adiyodi, K.G. (1974). Biochemistry of the accessory sex gland complex in male cockroaches (Periplaneta americana), J. Reprod. Fert., 38, 228-229.

== Personal life ==
K. G. Adiyodi died of a cardiac arrest at New Delhi on May 28, 2001. His wife Rita G. Adiyodi was a co-editor of the series Reproductive Biology of Invertebrates. They had two children.
