= S. Murugesan (DMK politician) =

Indian politician

Member of the Tamil Nadu Legislative Assembly
- In office 12 May 2021 – 10 May 2026
- Preceded by: N. Sadhan Prabhakar
- Constituency: Paramakudi

Personal details
- Party: Dravida Munnetra Kazhagam

S. Murugesan is an Indian politician who is a Member of Legislative Assembly of Tamil Nadu. He was elected from Paramakudi as a Dravida Munnetra Kazhagam candidate in 2021.

== Elections performance ==
| Election | Constituency | Party | Result | Vote % | Runner-up | Runner-up Party | Runner-up vote % | Ref. |
|---|---|---|---|---|---|---|---|---|
| 2021 Tamil Nadu Legislative Assembly election | Paramakudi | DMK | Won | 46.91% | N. Sadhan Prabhakar | ADMK | 39.57% | |
