= Paramakudi Assembly constituency =

One of the 234 State Legislative Assembly Constituencies in Tamil Nadu, in India

Coordinates: 9°32′42.65″N 78°33′48.08″E

Paramakudi
- Constituency No. 209 for the Tamil Nadu Legislative Assembly

Constituency details
- Country: India
- Region: South India
- State: Tamil Nadu
- District: Ramanathapuram
- Lok Sabha constituency: Ramanathapuram
- Established: 1951
- Total electors: 234,608
- Reservation: SC

Member of Legislative Assembly
- 17th Tamil Nadu Legislative Assembly
- Incumbent Advocate Kathiravan K K
- Party: DMK
- Elected year: 2026

Paramakudi is a state assembly constituency in Ramanathapuram district in Tamil Nadu. It is reserved for the Scheduled Castes. It is a component of Ramanathapuram Lok Sabha constituency. It is one of the 234 State Legislative Assembly Constituencies in Tamil Nadu.

Elections and winners in the constituency are listed below.

== Members of Legislative Assembly ==
Year	Member	Political party
Madras State
1952	Govindan	Indian National Congress
1957	K. Ramachandran	Independent politician
1962	C. Srinivasa Iyengar	Indian National Congress
1967	T. K. Siraimeetan	Dravida Munnetra Kazhagam
Tamil Nadu
1971	T. K. Siraimeettan	Dravida Munnetra Kazhagam
1977	K. Ugrapandian	All India Anna Dravida Munnetra Kazhagam
1980	R. Thavasi	All India Anna Dravida Munnetra Kazhagam
1984	K. Baluchamy	All India Anna Dravida Munnetra Kazhagam
1989	Dr. S. Sundararaj	All India Anna Dravida Munnetra Kazhagam
1991	Dr. S. Sundararaj	All India Anna Dravida Munnetra Kazhagam
1996	U. Thisaiveeran	Dravida Munnetra Kazhagam
2001	R. Ramprabhu	Tamil Maanila Congress (Moopanar)
2006	R. Ramprabhu	Indian National Congress
2011	S. Sundararaj	All India Anna Dravida Munnetra Kazhagam
2016	S. Muthiah (Note: disqualification by Assembly Speaker 2017)	All India Anna Dravida Munnetra Kazhagam
2019 (Note: By-Election)	N. Sadhan Prabhakar	All India Anna Dravida Munnetra Kazhagam
2021	S. Murugesan	Dravida Munnetra Kazhagam
2026	K. K. Kathiravan	Dravida Munnetra Kazhagam

== Election results ==
Vote share of winning candidates
2026	31.18%
2021	46.59%
2019 by-election	46.86%
2016	46.89%
2011	57.88%
2006	45.36%
2001	49.58%
1996	43.18%
1991	66.72%
1989	36.53%
1984	58.19%
1980	54.22%
1977	36.31%
1971	58.97%
1967	56.67%
1962	44.78%
1957	54.68%
1952	41.01%

=== 2026 ===
2026 Tamil Nadu Legislative Assembly election: Paramakudi
Party	Candidate	Votes	%	±%
DMK	K. K. Kathiravan	59,161	31.18	▼15.73
TVK	Gopirajan G	55,613	29.31	New
AIADMK	Dr Muthiah S	54,099	28.51	▼11.06
NTK	Ezhil Elavarasi R	15,363	8.1	▼0.98
AIPTMMK	Amirtha M	2,239	1.18	
PT	Rathina Prakash K	1,004	0.53	
NOTA	NOTA	710	0.37	
Margin of victory		3,548		
Turnout		1,89,753		
Rejected ballots				
Registered electors		233,433		
DMK hold		Swing		

=== 2021 ===
2021 Tamil Nadu Legislative Assembly election: Paramakudi
Party	Candidate	Votes	%	±%
DMK	S. Murugesan	84,864	46.91%	+6.76
AIADMK	N. Sadhan Prabhakar	71,579	39.57%	−7.33
NTK	S. Sasikala	16,430	9.08%	+7.51
MNM	M. Karuppu Raja	3,488	1.93%	New
DMDK	U. Selvi	2,009	1.11%	New
NOTA	NOTA	1,258	0.70%	−0.25
Margin of victory		13,285	7.34%	0.61%
Turnout		180,900	70.76%	2.05%
Rejected ballots		287	0.16%	
Registered electors		255,654		
DMK gain from AIADMK		Swing	0.02%	

=== 2019 by-election ===
2019 Tamil Nadu Legislative Assembly by-elections: Paramakudi
Party	Candidate	Votes	%	±%
AIADMK	N. Sadhan Prabhakar	82,438	46.86	
DMK	S. Sambathkumar	68,406		
Independent	Dr. S. Muthiah	9,672		
NTK	Hemalatha	6,710		
MNM	A. Shankar	5,421		
NOTA	None of the Above	1,616		
Majority		14,032		
Turnout		1,75,916		
Registered electors		2,46,727		
AIADMK hold		Swing		

=== 2016 ===
2016 Tamil Nadu Legislative Assembly election: Paramakudi
Party	Candidate	Votes	%	±%
AIADMK	Dr. S. Muthiah	79,254	46.89%	−10.98
DMK	U. Thisaiveeran	67,865	40.15%	New
BJP	V. Pon. Balaganapathy	9,537	5.64%	+2.43
VCK	M. Irulan	3,780	2.24%	New
NTK	V. Hemalatha	2,655	1.57%	New
NOTA	NOTA	1,598	0.95%	New
Margin of victory		11,389	6.74%	−16.51%
Turnout		169,009	68.71%	−3.71%
Registered electors		245,978		
AIADMK hold		Swing	-10.98%	

=== 2011 ===
2011 Tamil Nadu Legislative Assembly election: Paramakudi
Party	Candidate	Votes	%	±%
AIADMK	Dr. S. Sundararaj	86,150	57.88%	+13.45
INC	R. Ramprabhu	51,544	34.63%	−10.73
BJP	Suba Nagarajan	4,787	3.22%	+1.36
BSP	R. Gandhi	1,538	1.03%	−0.44
Independent	V. Velu	1,522	1.02%	New
TMMK	M. Saravanakumar	1,444	0.97%	New
Margin of victory		34,606	23.25%	22.31%
Turnout		148,855	72.42%	5.81%
Registered electors		205,541		
AIADMK gain from INC		Swing	12.52%	

=== 2006 ===
2006 Tamil Nadu Legislative Assembly election: Paramakudi
Party	Candidate	Votes	%	±%
INC	R. Ramprabhu	51,075	45.36%	New
AIADMK	Dr. S. Sundararaj	50,021	44.42%	New
DMDK	A. Thirumamalai Raja	4,554	4.04%	New
BJP	K. Ugrapandian	2,090	1.86%	New
BSP	A. Kalidass	1,654	1.47%	New
Independent	R. Pandian	1,307	1.16%	New
Independent	U. Kamarasan	614	0.55%	New
Margin of victory		1,054	0.94%	−4.42%
Turnout		112,600	66.61%	6.99%
Registered electors		169,035		
INC gain from TMC(M)		Swing	-4.22%	

=== 2001 ===
2001 Tamil Nadu Legislative Assembly election: Paramakudi
Party	Candidate	Votes	%	±%
TMC(M)	R. Ramprabhu	53,746	49.58%	New
PT	S. Chelliah	47,939	44.22%	New
MDMK	K. Durairaju	4,153	3.83%	−1.61
Independent	Sakthivel M	1,497	1.38%	New
Independent	B. Elavarasan	1,075	0.99%	New
Margin of victory		5,807	5.36%	−12.99%
Turnout		108,410	59.62%	−6.28%
Registered electors		181,847		
TMC(M) gain from DMK		Swing	6.40%	

=== 1996 ===
1996 Tamil Nadu Legislative Assembly election: Paramakudi
Party	Candidate	Votes	%	±%
DMK	U. Thisaiveeran	44,472	43.18%	New
Independent	K. Muniasamy	25,571	24.83%	New
AIADMK	S. Sundararaj	23,207	22.53%	−44.19
MDMK	T. K. Siraimeettan	5,604	5.44%	New
PMK	K. Ugrapandian	946	0.92%	New
Independent	S. Ramasamy	871	0.85%	New
Independent	S. M. R. Thangasamy Devendiran	775	0.75%	New
Margin of victory		18,901	18.35%	−22.02%
Turnout		103,001	65.91%	6.56%
Registered electors		169,729		
DMK gain from AIADMK		Swing	-23.54%	

=== 1991 ===
1991 Tamil Nadu Legislative Assembly election: Paramakudi
Party	Candidate	Votes	%	±%
AIADMK	S. Sundararaj	63,577	66.72%	+30.19
CPI	S. Jeyapaul	25,111	26.35%	New
Independent	N. Chandran	4,274	4.49%	New
Independent	R. Madasamy	1,229	1.29%	New
Independent	M. Magarajan	1,100	1.15%	New
Margin of victory		38,466	40.37%	37.04%
Turnout		95,291	59.34%	−9.40%
Registered electors		171,075		
AIADMK hold		Swing	30.19%	

=== 1989 ===
1989 Tamil Nadu Legislative Assembly election: Paramakudi
Party	Candidate	Votes	%	±%
AIADMK	S. Sundararaj	37,494	36.53%	−21.66
DMK	K. V. R. Kandasmay	34,080	33.20%	−6.89
INC	K. R. V. Rakkan	19,681	19.17%	New
AIADMK	A. Baluchamy	8,473	8.25%	−49.94
BJP	S. Nagarajan	2,164	2.11%	New
Independent	V. Govindan	749	0.73%	New
Margin of victory		3,414	3.33%	−14.77%
Turnout		102,641	68.75%	−4.72%
Registered electors		151,860		
AIADMK hold		Swing	-21.66%	

=== 1984 ===
1984 Tamil Nadu Legislative Assembly election: Paramakudi
Party	Candidate	Votes	%	±%
AIADMK	K. Baluchamy	54,401	58.19%	+3.97
DMK	T. K. Siraimeettan	37,480	40.09%	−3.17
Independent	K. Muthukkannu	1,216	1.30%	New
Margin of victory		16,921	18.10%	7.14%
Turnout		93,485	73.47%	7.65%
Registered electors		133,365		
AIADMK hold		Swing	3.97%	

=== 1980 ===
1980 Tamil Nadu Legislative Assembly election: Paramakudi
Party	Candidate	Votes	%	±%
AIADMK	R. Thavasi	43,710	54.22%	+17.91
DMK	A. Elamaran	34,876	43.26%	+22.98
Independent	V. Kairasi Pandian	1,298	1.61%	New
Margin of victory		8,834	10.96%	5.71%
Turnout		80,616	65.82%	2.72%
Registered electors		123,848		
AIADMK hold		Swing	17.91%	

=== 1977 ===
1977 Tamil Nadu Legislative Assembly election: Paramakudi
Party	Candidate	Votes	%	±%
AIADMK	K. Ugrapandian	27,303	36.31%	New
INC	K. Krishnan	23,357	31.06%	−3.35
DMK	T. K. Siraimeettan	15,254	20.29%	−38.69
JP	A. V. Swaminathan	8,156	10.85%	New
Independent	V. Govindan Chatrakudi	817	1.09%	New
Margin of victory		3,946	5.25%	−19.32%
Turnout		75,194	63.10%	−8.78%
Registered electors		120,599		
AIADMK gain from DMK		Swing	-22.66%	

=== 1971 ===
1971 Tamil Nadu Legislative Assembly election: Paramakudi
Party	Candidate	Votes	%	±%
DMK	T. K. Siraimeettan	42,614	58.97%	+2.31
INC	K. V. Rakkan	24,864	34.41%	−1.98
Independent	V. Govindan	4,782	6.62%	New
Margin of victory		17,750	24.56%	4.29%
Turnout		72,260	71.88%	−6.10%
Registered electors		103,332		
DMK hold		Swing	2.31%	

=== 1967 ===
1967 Madras Legislative Assembly election: Paramakudi
Party	Candidate	Votes	%	±%
DMK	T. K. Siraimeetan	40,428	56.67%	+26.49
INC	R. Thavasi	25,962	36.39%	−8.39
CPI	Pasumalai	3,391	4.75%	−9.11
ABJS	K. Muthurakku	675	0.95%	New
Independent	P. Kapuppiah	649	0.91%	New
Margin of victory		14,466	20.28%	5.67%
Turnout		71,344	77.99%	5.46%
Registered electors		94,043		
DMK gain from INC		Swing	11.89%	

=== 1962 ===
1962 Madras Legislative Assembly election: Paramakudi
Party	Candidate	Votes	%	±%
INC	C. Srinivasa Iyengar	33,301	44.78%	+15.11
DMK	S. P. Thangavelan	22,439	30.17%	New
CPI	M. Muttusamy	10,313	13.87%	New
SWA	S. Ramasamy Thevar	3,945	5.30%	New
PSP	M. Shanmugam Servai	2,283	3.07%	New
Independent	K. Velu	2,091	2.81%	New
Margin of victory		10,862	14.60%	−10.41%
Turnout		74,372	72.52%	27.56%
Registered electors		106,433		
INC gain from Independent		Swing	-9.91%	

=== 1957 ===
1957 Madras Legislative Assembly election: Paramakudi
Party	Candidate	Votes	%	±%
Independent	K. Ramachandran	24,695	54.68%	New
INC	Govindan	13,398	29.67%	−11.34
Independent	M. Sathivel	5,023	11.12%	New
Independent	A. Thiagaraj	2,045	4.53%	New
Margin of victory		11,297	25.01%	4.98%
Turnout		45,161	44.96%	−6.70%
Registered electors		100,451		
Independent gain from INC		Swing	13.68%	

=== 1952 ===
1952 Madras Legislative Assembly election: Paramakudi
Party	Candidate	Votes	%	±%
INC	Govindan	13,859	41.01%	New
CPI	Natarajan	7,088	20.97%	New
Independent	Srinivasa Naidu	6,088	18.01%	New
Socialist Party (India)	Pitchu	5,421	16.04%	New
Independent	Sontiago	1,342	3.97%	New
Margin of victory		6,771	20.03%	
Turnout		33,798	51.66%	
Registered electors		65,430		
INC win (new seat)				
