= T. K. Siraimeetan =

Indian politician

T. S. Siraimeetan was an Indian politician and former Member of the Legislative Assembly of Tamil Nadu. He was elected to the Tamil Nadu legislative assembly as a Dravida Munnetra Kazhagam candidate from Paramakudi constituency in the 1967 and 1971 elections.
