= G. Govindan =

Indian politician

Member of the Tamil Nadu Legislative Assembly
- Incumbent
- Assumed office 1952
- Constituency: Paramakudi

Personal details
- Party: Indian National Congress

G. Govindan was an Indian politician and former Member of the Legislative Assembly of Tamil Nadu. He was elected to the Tamil Nadu Legislative Assembly as an Indian National Congress candidate from Paramakudi constituency in 1952 election.
