= C. Srinivasa Iyengar =

Indian politician

C. Srinivasa Iyengar was an Indian politician and former Member of the Legislative Assembly of Tamil Nadu. He was elected to the Tamil Nadu Legislative Assembly as an Indian National Congress candidate from Paramakudi constituency in 1962 election.
