= Tirukkollikkadu Agneeswarar Temple =

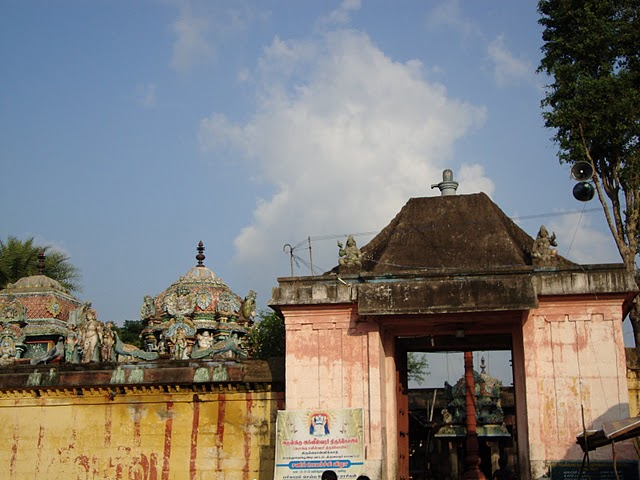

Religion
- Affiliation: Hinduism
- District: Tiruvarur
- Deity: Lord Shiva

Location
- Location: Tirukkollikkadu in Tiruvarur district
- State: Tamil Nadu
- Country: India
- Interactive map of Tirukkollikkadu Agneeswarar Temple

Architecture
- Type: Dravidian architecture

Tirukkollikkadu Agneeswarar Temple is a Hindu temple located at Tirukkollikkadu in Tiruvarur district, Tamil Nadu, India. The temple is dedicated to Shiva, as the moolavar presiding deity, in his manifestation as Agneeswarar. His consort, Parvati, is known as Panjin Melladi Ammai. The historical name of the place is Keeralathur. This is a Sacred Temple which is believed to bring good fortune and burn hindrances of the devotees.

== Significance ==
It is one of the shrines of the 275 Paadal Petra Sthalams (No:115) - Shiva Sthalams glorified in the early medieval Tevaram poems by Tamil Saivite Nayanar Tirugnanasambandar.
