= S. Muthiah (politician) =

Indian politician

S. Muthiah is an Indian politician who was elected to the 15th Tamil Nadu Legislative Assembly in the 2016 elections from the Paramakudi constituency. He was a candidate of the All India Anna Dravida Munnetra Kazhagam party.

He was one of the 18 members who were disqualified by Speaker P. Dhanapal as they withdrew support to Chief Minister Edappadi K. Palaniswami and became loyal to rebel leader T.T.V. Dhinakaran and joined his party Amma Makkal Munnetra Kazhagam.
