= Kambalath Govindan Nair =

Indian freedom fighter and poet

- Born: 15 April 1914; Malappuram, Kerala
- Died: 30 April 1983; Malappuram
- Occupations: Teacher, poet, activist
- Known for: Indian Independence Movement
- Spouse: Shinnammu Amma

Kambalath Govindan Nair (1914-1983) was an Indian freedom fighter, founder of a Teachers' Organization and a Malayalam poet in Kerala. He plays a major role in Malabar Rebellion by writing War Songs ( padappattu)

== Life and career ==
He was born in Nediyiruppu Village of Malappuram District in 1924. His parents were Kunhan Nair and Naniyamma.

== Family ==
He was married to Shinnammu Amma. They had 8 children.

== War Song (Padappattu) ==
In 1944, when Govindan Nair was working as a Clerk cum Bill Collector in Nediyiruppu Panchayath, a protest struggle started demanding the demolition of the Hitchcock memorial statue in Valluvambram. Hitchcock was the British District Police Officer who suppressed the Malabar Revolt. Govindan Nair was in the forefront of the protest. His war song (padappattu) titled "The Brave Children of Eranad" got widespread appreciation during and after the Indian independence struggle.

"Way back in [19]21 in this land of Malayalam

United we fought the forces of the white
with the sons of Eranad who shed blood
facing battle tanks with bare chests
Kunhahammadhaji of Variankunnath
led his team of souls moved by truth

Reason for our fight
was our objection to
feeding the lords
with our rice

Reason for our fight
was our objection to
sending our assets
to England

He did erect stone on our chest
that pig killed our brothers?
you can see the dead Hitchcock's grave stone
the real satan's tomb
on the road of Mongam
miles away from manjeri

This land has brave patriots
Oh white men
If you want to live long

escape to England soon"

— Kambalath Govindan Nair,

The Deshabhimani Weekly was confiscated by the British Government for publishing this war song of Kambalath Govindan Nair. It was prohibited then to keep this book or to sing the song.

== Works ==
- Onappudava
