= K. Baluchamy =

Indian politician

K. Baluchamy is an Indian politician and former Member of the Legislative Assembly of Tamil Nadu. He was elected to the Tamil Nadu legislative assembly as an Anna Dravida Munnetra Kazhagam candidate from Paramakudi constituency in 1984 Tamil Nadu state assembly election. He is a very humble, and kind hearted party man. He was a bus conductor and being a diehard and loyal grassroot party worker, he was awarded to contest in legislative assembly election by his Idol Dr. MGR and won the election by securing 54401 votes with margin of 16921 votes against the runner-up DMK's D.k.Siraimeetan. Since then Baluchamy has become famous leader in AIADMK and he was go to men for Ramanathapuram District's AIADMK party workers.
