= P. Govindan Nambiar =

Indian politician

P. Govindan Nambiar (15 December 1915 - 1969) was an Indian politician and leader of Communist Party of India. He represented Perinthalmanna constituency in the 1st Kerala Legislative Assembly.

He was also the President of Perinthalmanna Grama Panchayat. He entered politics in 1932 and joined the CPI in 1942. He was imprisoned several times.
