= N. Sadhan Prabhakar =

Indian politician

Niraikulathan Sadhan Prabhakar is an Indian politician and is Former Member of the Legislative Assembly of Tamil Nadu. He was elected to the Tamil Nadu legislative assembly as an All India Anna Dravida Munnetra Kazhagam candidate from Paramakudi constituency in the by-election in 2019. He lost in the 2021 Tamil Nadu Legislative Assembly Elections by a margin of 11,000 votes.

He is the son of Former Rajya Sabha MP from Tamil Nadu and AIADMK leader Thiru. Niraikulathan.
