= Kolady Govindan Kutty Menon =

Indian politician and leader of Communist Party of India (1928–2003)

Member of the Kerala Legislative Assembly
- In office 16 March 1957 – 31 July 1959
- Preceded by: Position established
- Succeeded by: B. V. S. Thangal
- Constituency: Andathode

Personal details
- Born: 1928
- Died: 13 August 2003 (aged 75)

Kolady Govindan Kutty Menon (1928 – 13 August 2003) was an Indian politician and leader of Communist Party of India (CPI). He represented Andathode constituency in 1st Kerala Legislative Assembly elected in the 1957 Kerala Legislative Assembly election.
