= Santhini Govindan =

Indian writer

Santhini Govindan (née Kutty) is an Indian author of children's literature in English. Her works include poetry, picture books, and short stories for children of all ages and have been translated into many Indian languages. She has also written articles, stories and features for children that have been published in children's magazines and national dailies in India and overseas. Govindan has also conducted workshops for children at schools across Mumbai and in other Indian cities, and has taught creative writing at the under-graduate level at Mumbai University.

== Early life and education ==
Santhini Govindan was born in San Francisco, California, to Santha Kutty and her husband Madhavan Kutty, a career diplomat in the Indian Foreign Service. She studied at the American Embassy International Schools at Prague in Czechoslovakia, in Bern, Switzerland, and in Colombo, Sri Lanka, where her father was posted as a diplomat. In 1977, she graduated with a bachelor's degree in economics from the University of Madras and went on to complete a master's degree in English literature in 1979.

== Literary career ==
Her writing career began after she won a prize in the National Competition for Writers of Children's books, organized by the Children's Book Trust, New Delhi, for her story "A Tale of Tuffy Turtle."

Govindan was awarded a two-year Junior Fellowship in Literature from the Ministry of Human Resource Development, Department of Culture, Government of India in 1996, to write historical fiction for children in the short story form. She was later awarded a two-year Senior Fellowship in Literature by the Department of Culture, Govt. of India, for a research project on "Children's Literature in English in India". In July 2001, she was the first Indian writer to be invited to attend the annual Highlights Foundation Writers Workshop, held at Chautauqua, New York, in the United States.

She has also worked for Highlights for Children, including to create the Parent and Teacher Guide for the Highlights Primary Education Foundation Programme, and the Parent and Teacher Guide for Getting Ready For School Programme and the Primary Plus Programme.

Govindan has subsequently won twenty awards for her stories in different categories and for different age groups at the National Competition for writers of Children's books organized by the Children's Book Trust from 1987 to 2016.

In October 2018, Govindan was awarded a two year Lok Sabha Research Fellowship by the Parliament of India, through its Speaker's Research Initiative, to write a book for children and adolescents about the role and functioning of the parliament of India.

She wrote two columns in the monthly children's magazine Chandamama on historical fiction and mythology for two years from 2011 until the magazine ceased publication in 2013.

Her book, The Anger of Apsu, (published by CBT, new Delhi) was recommended by the Department of Elementary Education, Early Literacy Programme, NCERT (National Council of Educational Training and Research, in its suggested list of selected children's literature, Level 2, (Grades III- IV) 2014. Govindan has written several books for children on Indian history for IL&FS ETS including It Happened 5000 years ago, (on the Indus Valley Civilization) Asoka’s Diary and The Magical Maratha on the Maratha king Shivaji.

In 2019, she published the children's book The Magic of Curly Whorly.

== Personal life ==
She is married to K. M. Govindan. She has a son and a daughter and resides and works in Mumbai, India.
