= P. Govindan Kutty =

Kathakali artist

P. Govindan Kutty, usually known as Govindan Kutty or Guru Govindan Kutty, was a Kathakali dancer.
