= Peralam =

- Town Panchayat
- Location in Tamil Nadu, India
- Coordinates: 10°58′02″N 79°40′16″E
- Country: India
- State: Tamil Nadu
- District: Thiruvarur

Population (2001)
  - Total: 5,844

Languages
  - Official: Tamil
- Time zone: UTC+5:30 (IST)
- Postal code: 609405

Peralam is a panchayat town in Thiruvarur district in the Indian state of Tamil Nadu.

== Demographics ==
As of 2001 India census, Peralam had a population of 5,844. Males constitute 50% of the population and females 50%. Peralam has an average literacy rate of 80%, higher than the national average of 59.5%: male literacy is 84%, and female literacy is 77%. In Peralam, 10% of the population is under 6 years of age.

== Notable people ==
- Rajesh Ramesh (athlete), sprinter specializing in the 400 meters
- Natarajan Pandiyan, physicist and academic

== Economy ==
The economy of Peralam is predominantly based on agriculture and small-scale industries. The town is known for its production of bamboo baskets and coir products.

== Geography and Climate ==
Peralam covers an area of 3.76 square kilometers, with a population density of 1,635.37 persons per square kilometer. The town experiences a typical tropical climate, with an average annual rainfall of 1,325.8 mm. The temperature ranges between a maximum of 38.8°C and a minimum of 20.5°C.

== Transportation ==
Peralam is well-connected by road and rail. The nearest major city is Tiruchirappalli, located 130 km away, while the state capital, Chennai, is 300 km distant. The town has its own railway station and bus station, which serve as key transit points for residents and visitors.

== Population Growth ==
The population of Peralam has shown gradual growth over the years. According to the Census of 2001, the population was 5,844. By 2011, it had increased to 6,149. The current estimated population in 2024 is approximately 8,500.

== Cultural and Religious Composition ==
Peralam has a predominantly Hindu population, constituting 97.12% of the total population. Muslims make up 1.69%, and Christians account for 0.78%. The town has a rich cultural heritage influenced by these communities.

== Local Governance and Administration ==
Peralam is administered by a Town Panchayat, which is responsible for providing basic amenities such as water, sewerage, and road construction. The town is divided into 12 wards, with elections held every five years.

== Education and Literacy ==
The literacy rate in Peralam is 88.77%, which is higher than the state average of 80.09%. Educational facilities include several primary and secondary schools that cater to the town's population.

== Local Economy and Agriculture ==
Peralam's economy is largely driven by agriculture, with a significant portion of the population engaged in farming. The primary crops include paddy, coconut, and groundnut. The town is also known for its cottage industries, particularly the production of bamboo baskets and coir products.

== Infrastructure and Public Services ==
Peralam has basic infrastructure, including a primary healthcare center and several private clinics. Public transportation is available via the town's railway station and bus station, connecting it to nearby cities like Tiruchirappalli and Chennai.

== Recent Developments ==
The construction of the Karaikal-Peralam railway line is a significant development that is expected to improve connectivity and boost the local economy. As of November 2023, 80% of the work on this railway line has been completed.

== Education ==
Peralam hosts several educational institutions that serve the local community.

== Temples Near Peralam ==
=== Sri Suyambunadhar Temple, Peralam ===
The Sri Suyambunadhar Temple is a significant Hindu temple located within Peralam itself. This ancient temple is dedicated to Lord Shiva, worshipped here as Suyambunadhar. The temple is known for its historical and spiritual significance, with many devotees visiting to seek blessings and perform rituals. The temple's architecture features traditional Tamil Nadu temple elements, including a Rajagopura (main tower) and a Dhwaja Stambha (flagstaff). The temple is also associated with various local legends and is an important religious site for the residents of Peralam and surrounding areas.

=== Mariamman Temple, Peralam ===
The Mariamman Temple in Peralam is a significant local shrine dedicated to Goddess Mariamman, who is widely revered as a powerful deity associated with rain, fertility, and health. This temple is a focal point for the local community, particularly during the annual Peralam Spring Festival. This festival typically occurs between March and April and is marked by various vibrant rituals, including processions, offerings, and traditional performances.

The festival is celebrated with great fervor, with devotees participating in events such as carrying milk pots, walking on embers, and offering special prayers to the goddess. The temple is elaborately decorated during the festival, and it draws visitors not only from Peralam but also from neighboring regions.

=== Thirumeeyachur Lalithambigai Temple ===
Located just 1 km west of Peralam, the Thirumeeyachur Lalithambigai Temple is a renowned temple dedicated to Lord Shiva, known here as Meghanatha Swami, and Goddess Lalithambika. The temple is deeply revered for its spiritual significance, particularly the belief that it is an auspicious place for chanting the Lalitha Sahasranama. The temple is famous for its architectural beauty, with intricate carvings and a unique Gajaprishta Vimana (a vimana shaped like the back of an elephant). The temple is also associated with various legends, including the story of Surya (the Sun God) worshipping Lord Shiva here to rid himself of a curse.

=== Paampuranathar Temple, Thirupampuram ===
Situated approximately 20 km from Peralam, the Paampuranathar Temple is another significant Shiva temple. It is particularly well-known for being a parihara sthalam, where devotees come to perform rituals to alleviate Naga Dosham (afflictions related to serpents). The temple's history is closely tied to the Chola dynasty, and it is one of the 276 Paadal Petra Sthalams, celebrated in Tamil Shaivite hymns. The temple is believed to have been constructed over a piece of Mount Kailash that fell to the earth.

=== Thirunallar Saneeswaran Temple ===
The Thirunallar Saneeswaran Temple is a highly revered Hindu temple located approximately 15 kilometers from Peralam, in the town of Thirunallar, Karaikal district. This temple is dedicated to Lord Shani (Saneeswaran), the planet Saturn, and is one of the most significant temples in India for devotees seeking relief from the malefic effects of Saturn.

==== Significance ====
Thirunallar Saneeswaran Temple is one of the Navagraha (nine planetary) temples in Tamil Nadu, specifically associated with Shani. The temple is particularly famous for the ritual of "Shani Peyarchi," which marks the transit of Saturn from one zodiac sign to another. Devotees from all over India visit the temple to offer prayers and perform rituals to appease Lord Shani, hoping to reduce the hardships believed to be caused by the influence of Saturn in their astrological charts.

==== Rituals and Practices ====
A key ritual at this temple is the "Nala Theertham" bath, which is believed to wash away sins and alleviate the hardships caused by Saturn's influence. Devotees usually take a dip in this sacred tank before entering the temple to offer their prayers. Inside the temple, special poojas (rituals) and offerings are made to Lord Shani, especially on Saturdays, which is considered the most auspicious day to worship Shani.

==== Architecture and Temple Complex ====
The temple features traditional Dravidian architecture, with a towering gopuram (gateway tower) and intricate carvings that reflect the ancient temple design of Tamil Nadu. The main deity, Lord Shani, is enshrined in a sanctum sanctorum that draws large crowds, especially during important astrological events.

==== Accessibility from Peralam ====
The Thirunallar Saneeswaran Temple is easily accessible from Peralam via road. Regular buses and private vehicles provide convenient transportation between the two towns, making it a popular pilgrimage destination for the residents of Peralam and nearby areas.

==== Festivals ====
The temple is especially crowded during the "Shani Peyarchi" festival, which occurs every two and a half years when Saturn moves from one zodiac sign to the next. During this time, thousands of devotees flock to the temple to seek the blessings of Lord Shani and participate in the special rituals organized by the temple authorities.

=== Thiruvarur Thyagaraja Temple ===
About 25 km from Peralam, the Thyagaraja Temple in Thiruvarur is one of the most prominent temples dedicated to Lord Shiva. Known as Thyagarajaswamy, Shiva here is worshipped in the form of a Lingam. This temple is famed for its massive chariot, the largest of its kind in Tamil Nadu, used during the annual chariot festival. The temple complex is vast and includes numerous shrines and a large temple tank, Kamalalayam. The temple has a rich history, with connections to the Chola dynasty and significant contributions from various Tamil saints.

=== Sri Vanchinathaswamy Temple, Srivanchiyam ===
Located about 30 km from Peralam, this temple is unique as it is considered "one-sixteenth" more sacred than Varanasi, making it a highly revered pilgrimage site. The temple is dedicated to Lord Shiva as Vanchinathar, with the deity believed to be a Swayambumurthi (self-manifested). The temple has a rich history and is an important site for performing ancestral rituals.
