= B. V. Ramanaa =

Indian politician

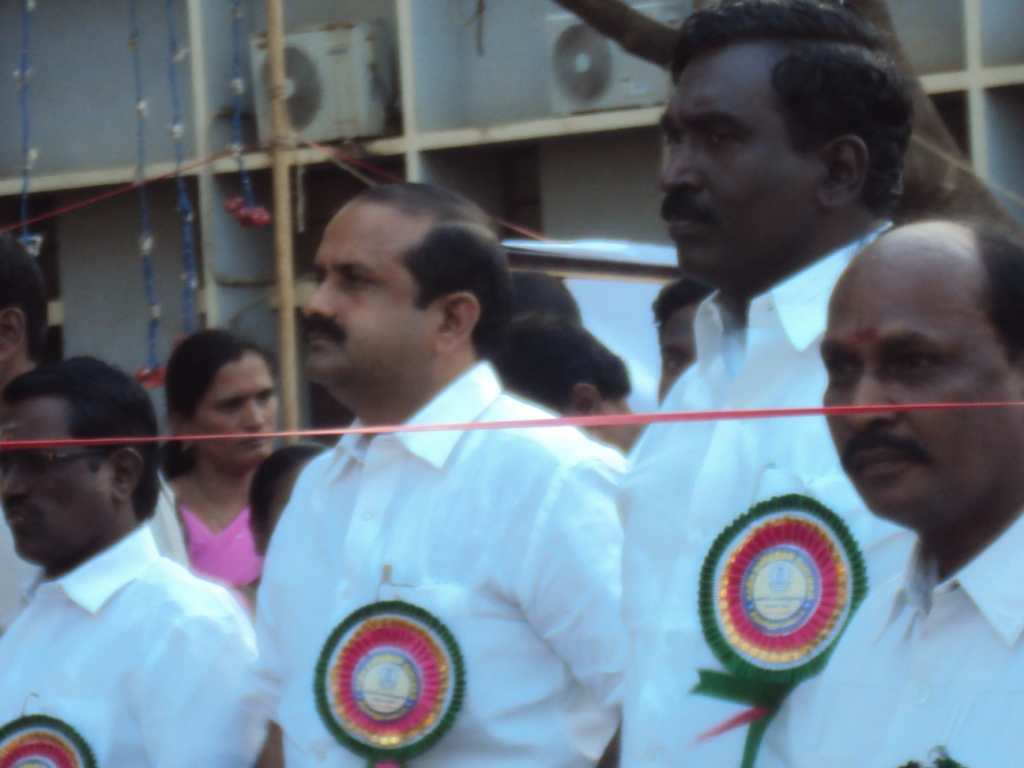
- Ministers Ramana Moorthy

Minister to the Government of Tamil Nadu
- In office 16 May 2011 – 20 February 2016
- Constituency: Thiruvallur

Member of Tamil Nadu legislative assembly
- In office 14 May 2011 – 20 May 2016
- Preceded by: E. A. P. Sivaji
- Succeeded by: V. G. Raajendran
- Constituency: Thiruvallur

Personal details
- Party: All India Anna Dravida Munnetra Kazhagam

B. V. Ramanaa (born 8 May 1967) is an Indian politician who was a member of the 14th Tamil Nadu Legislative Assembly from the Thiruvallur constituency. He represented the All India Anna Dravida Munnetra Kazhagam party.

Ramanaa was appointed Minister for Handlooms and in November 2011 a cabinet reshuffle by Jayalalithaa resulted in him replacing T. K. M. Chinnayya as Minister for the Environment, with S. Sundararaj taking over the Handlooms portfolio. As a minister, he handled the portfolios for Commercial Taxes and Registration, Revenue and Milk & Dairy Development in the Government of Tamil Nadu.

During the elections of 2016, he did not contest as seat was not given to him resulted in constituency being won by Dravida Munnetra Kazhagam's V. G. Raajendran. In 2021 he contested and lost in Thiruvallur constituency by 22207 votes to VGR of DMK.

== Electoral performance ==
2021 Tamil Nadu Legislative Assembly election: Thiruvallur
Party	Candidate	Votes	%	±%
DMK	V. G. Raajendran	107,709	50.27%	+11.26
AIADMK	Be. Vee. Ramanah	85,008	39.68%	+3.15
NTK	P. Pasupathy	15,028	7.01%	+6.31
BSP	D. Doss	2,329	1.09%	+0.03
NOTA	NOTA	1,872	0.87%	+0.19
Margin of victory		22,701	10.60%	8.10%
Turnout		214,243	77.94%	−2.14%
Rejected ballots		159	0.07%	
Registered electors		274,876		
DMK hold		Swing	11.26%	

2011 Tamil Nadu Legislative Assembly election: Thiruvallur
Party	Candidate	Votes	%	±%
AIADMK	B. V. Ramanaa	91,337	53.69%	+12.22
DMK	E. A. P. Sivaji	67,689	39.79%	−8.35
Puratchi Bharatham	E. James	2,220	1.30%	New
BJP	R. M. R. Janakiraman	1,869	1.10%	+0.28
RJD	T. A. Deivasigamani	1,080	0.63%	New
BSP	V. Shanthakumar	1,039	0.61%	+0.07
Margin of victory		23,648	13.90%	7.23%
Turnout		170,115	81.81%	10.91%
Registered electors		207,935		
AIADMK gain from DMK		Swing	5.55%	

2006 Tamil Nadu Legislative Assembly election: Thiruvallur
Party	Candidate	Votes	%	±%
DMK	E. A. P. Sivaji	64,378	48.14%	New
AIADMK	B. V. Ramanaa	55,454	41.47%	New
DMDK	B. Paratha Sarathi	8,048	6.02%	New
Independent	S. Jegajeevanram	1,413	1.06%	New
BJP	R. S. Veeramani	1,092	0.82%	New
Independent	M. Vasan	885	0.66%	New
BSP	D. Srinivasan	722	0.54%	New
Margin of victory		8,924	6.67%	−11.20%
Turnout		133,732	70.90%	13.11%
Registered electors		188,609		
DMK gain from TMC(M)		Swing	5.24%	
