= C. K. Thamizharasan =

Indian politician

Member of Tamil Nadu Legislative Assembly
- In office 13 May 2011 – 19 May 2016
- Constituency: K. V. Kuppam
- In office 13 May 2001 – 11 May 2006
- Constituency: Nannilam
- In office 18 June 1991 – 12 May 1996
- Constituency: Vandavasi
- In office 31 December 1984 – 30 January 1988
- Constituency: Peranambut

C. K. Tamilarasan is an Indian politician and was a member of the Tamil Nadu Legislative Assembly from the K. V. Kuppam constituency. He represented the Republican Party of India party. He was made the Interim Speaker in the floor of Fourteenth Assembly.

The elections of 2016 resulted in his constituency being won by G. Loganathan.
