= S. Chandran =

Indian politician

Member of the Tamil Nadu Legislative Assembly
- Incumbent
- Assumed office 12 May 2021
- Preceded by: P. M. Narasimhan
- Constituency: Tiruttani

Personal details
- Party: Dravida Munnetra Kazhagam
- Spouse: C. Bhama
- Children: C. Kanishka
- Education: University of Madras; Vivekananda College of Law

S. Chandran is an Indian politician Member of Legislative Assembly of Tamil Nadu. He was elected from Tiruttani as a Dravida Munnetra Kazhagam candidate in 2021.

== Electoral performance ==
2021 Tamil Nadu Legislative Assembly election : Tiruttani
Party	Candidate	Votes	%	±%
DMK	S. Chandran	120,314	52.09	New
AIADMK	G. Hari	91,061	39.43	▼2.41
DMDK	D. Krishnamoorthi	3,928	1.70	▼5.34
NOTA	None of the above	1,665	0.72	▼0.21
Margin of victory		29,253	12.67	▲2.27
Turnout		233,222	80.05	▼0.89
Total valid votes		230,959		
Rejected ballots		598	0.26	▲0.25
Registered electors		291,336		▲6.01
DMK gain from AIADMK		Swing	▲10.25	
