= Thiruvallur Assembly constituency =

State Legislative Assembly Constituency in Tamil Nadu

Coordinates: 13.12°N 79.91°E

Tiruvallur
- Constituency No. 4 for the Tamil Nadu Legislative Assembly

Constituency details
- Country: India
- Region: South India
- State: Tamil Nadu
- Established: 1951
- Total electors: 251,018
- Reservation: None

Member of Legislative Assembly
- 17th Tamil Nadu Legislative Assembly
- Incumbent Dr. Arunkumar
- Party: TVK
- Alliance: TVK
- Elected year: 2026

Tiruvallur is a state assembly constituency in Tiruvallur district in Tamil Nadu. Its State Assembly Constituency number is 4. It consists of portions of Tiruttani and Thiruvallur taluks. It falls under Thiruvallur Lok Sabha constituency. It is one of the 234 State Legislative Assembly Constituencies in Tamil Nadu, in India. Elections and winners in the constituency are listed below.

== Members of the Legislative Assembly ==
Election	Member	Party
1952	M. Dharmalingam	Kisan Mazdoor Praja Party
1952	V. Govindaswamy Naidu	Kisan Mazdoor Praja Party
1957	Eakambara Mudaly	Indian National Congress
1957	V. S. Arunachalam	Indian National Congress
1962	V. S. Arunachalam	Indian National Congress
1967	S. M. Dorairaj	Dravida Munnetra Kazhagam
1971	S. M. Dorairaj	Dravida Munnetra Kazhagam
1977	S. Pattabiraman	All India Anna Dravida Munnetra Kazhagam
1980	S. Pattabiraman	All India Anna Dravida Munnetra Kazhagam
1984	S. Pattabiraman	All India Anna Dravida Munnetra Kazhagam
1989	S. R. Munirathinam	Dravida Munnetra Kazhagam
1991	D. Devaraj Sakkubai	All India Anna Dravida Munnetra Kazhagam
1996	C. Subramani	Dravida Munnetra Kazhagam
2001	D. Sudarsanam	Tamil Maanila Congress
2006	E. A. P. Sivaji	Dravida Munnetra Kazhagam
2011	B. V. Ramanaa	All India Anna Dravida Munnetra Kazhagam
2016	V. G. Raajendran	Dravida Munnetra Kazhagam
2021	V. G. Raajendran	Dravida Munnetra Kazhagam
2026	Dr. T. Arunkumar	Tamilaga Vettri Kazhagam

Madras State

== Election results ==
Vote share of winning candidates
2026	40.71%
2021	50.27%
2016	36.09%
2011	53.69%
2006	48.14%
2001	42.90%
1996	60.78%
1991	56.91%
1989	47.18%
1984	51.73%
1980	41.49%
1977	45.38%
1971	62.81%
1967	66.06%
1962	50.19%
1957	33.72%
1952	26.65%

=== 2026 ===
2026 Tamil Nadu Legislative Assembly election : Thiruvallur
Party	Candidate	Votes	%	±%
TVK	Dr. T. Arunkumar	92,190	40.71%	New
DMK	V. G. Raajendran	67,430	29.78%	▼20.94
AIADMK	Be. Vee. Ramanah	56,562	24.98%	New
NTK	K. Senthil Kumar	5,513	2.43%	▼4.65
NOTA	None of the above	1,132	0.50%	▼0.38
Margin of victory		24,760	10.94%	▲0.25
Turnout		226,788	90.31%	▲12.34
Total valid votes		226,428		
Registered electors		251,111		▼8.68
TVK gain from DMK		Swing	▼10.01	

=== 2021 ===
2021 Tamil Nadu Legislative Assembly election : Thiruvallur
Party	Candidate	Votes	%	±%
DMK	V. G. Raajendran	107,709	50.72%	▲11.70
AIADMK	Be. Vee. Ramanah	85,008	40.03%	▲3.50
NTK	P. Pasupathy	15,028	7.08%	▲6.38
BSP	D. Doss	2,329	1.10%	▲0.05
NOTA	None of the above	1,872	0.88%	▲0.19
Margin of victory		22,701	10.69%	▲8.20
Turnout		214,402	77.97%	▼2.20
Total valid votes		212,371		
Rejected ballots		159	0.07%	▼0.05
Registered electors		274,982		▲6.77
DMK hold		Swing	▲11.70	

=== 2016 ===
2016 Tamil Nadu Legislative Assembly election : Thiruvallur
Party	Candidate	Votes	%	±%
DMK	V. G. Raajendran	80,473	39.02%	▼0.77
AIADMK	A. Baskaran	75,335	36.53%	▼17.16
PMK	V. Balayogi	31,935	15.48%	New
VCK	A. Balasubramani	7,006	3.40%	New
BSP	M. Prem Sekar	2,171	1.05%	▲0.44
BJP	K. Srinivasan	1,826	0.89%	▼0.21
NTK	K. Senthil Kumar	1,451	0.70%	New
NOTA	None of the above	1,418	0.69%	New
Margin of victory		5,138	2.49%	▼11.41
Turnout		206,488	80.17%	▲80.17
Total valid votes		206,244		
Rejected ballots		244	0.12%	
Registered electors		257,558		▲23.86
DMK gain from AIADMK		Swing	▼14.67	

=== 2011 ===
2011 Tamil Nadu Legislative Assembly election : Thiruvallur
Party	Candidate	Votes	%	±%
AIADMK	B. V. Ramanaa	91,337	53.69%	▲12.22
DMK	E. A. P. Sivaji	67,689	39.79%	▼8.35
Puratchi Bharatham	E. James	2,220	1.30%	New
BJP	R. M. R. Janakiraman	1,869	1.10%	▲0.28
RJD	T. A. Deivasigamani	1,080	0.63%	New
BSP	V. Shanthakumar	1,039	0.61%	▲0.07
Margin of victory		23,648	13.90%	▲7.23
Total valid votes		170,115		
Rejected ballots		554	0.00%	
Registered electors		207,935		▲10.25
AIADMK gain from DMK		Swing	▲5.55	

=== 2006 ===
2006 Tamil Nadu Legislative Assembly election : Thiruvallur
Party	Candidate	Votes	%	±%
DMK	E. A. P. Sivaji	64,378	48.14%	New
AIADMK	B. V. Ramanaa	55,454	41.47%	New
DMDK	B. Paratha Sarathi	8,048	6.02%	New
Independent	S. Jegajeevanram	1,413	1.06%	New
BJP	R. S. Veeramani	1,092	0.82%	New
Independent	M. Vasan	885	0.66%	New
Margin of victory		8,924	6.67%	▼11.20
Turnout		133,734	70.91%	▲13.11
Total valid votes		133,732		
Registered electors		188,609		▼2.48
DMK gain from TMC(M)		Swing	▲5.24	

=== 2001 ===
2001 Tamil Nadu Legislative Assembly election : Thiruvallur
Party	Candidate	Votes	%	±%
TMC(M)	D. Sudarsanam	47,899	42.90%	New
PNK	V. G. Raajendran	27,948	25.03%	New
Independent	T. S. Sachithanandham	18,145	16.25%	New
Independent	P. Vijayakumar	6,090	5.45%	New
Puratchi Bharatham	E. James	4,738	4.24%	New
MDMK	R. Vasu	2,674	2.40%	▼2.04
Independent	C. Karunakaran	1,141	1.02%	New
Independent	Pauldoss Alias Murugesan	815	0.73%	New
Independent	R. Mohana	696	0.62%	New
Margin of victory		19,951	17.87%	▼13.02
Turnout		111,789	57.80%	▼11.15
Total valid votes		111,648		
Registered electors		193,411		▲18.51
TMC(M) gain from DMK		Swing	▼17.88	

=== 1996 ===
1996 Tamil Nadu Legislative Assembly election : Thiruvallur
Party	Candidate	Votes	%	±%
DMK	C. Subramani	65,432	60.78%	▲31.58
AIADMK	G. Kanagaraaj	32,178	29.89%	New
MDMK	D. Gajendran	4,781	4.44%	New
Independent	R. Dhalapathi	3,485	3.24%	New
BJP	Suba. Selvarasan	923	0.86%	▼1.28
Margin of victory		33,254	30.89%	▲3.18
Turnout		112,527	68.95%	▲3.66
Total valid votes		107,657		
Registered electors		163,199		▲6.69
DMK gain from AIADMK		Swing	▲3.87	

=== 1991 ===
1991 Tamil Nadu Legislative Assembly election : Thiruvallur
Party	Candidate	Votes	%	±%
AIADMK	D. Devaraj Sakkubai	54,267	56.91%	New
DMK	C. Subramani	27,847	29.20%	▼17.98
PMK	S. Arumugam	5,795	6.08%	New
Independent	J. Baskar	3,915	4.11%	New
BJP	M. Loganathan	2,038	2.14%	New
Margin of victory		26,420	27.71%	▲4.44
Turnout		99,876	65.29%	▼6.35
Total valid votes		95,353		
Registered electors		152,972		▲12.42
AIADMK gain from DMK		Swing	▲9.73	

=== 1989 ===
1989 Tamil Nadu Legislative Assembly election : Thiruvallur
Party	Candidate	Votes	%	±%
DMK	S. R. Munirathinam	45,091	47.18%	▲0.75
AIADMK	M. Selvaraj	22,852	23.91%	New
INC	D. Sudarsanam	17,686	18.51%	New
AIADMK	S. Pattabiraman	7,300	7.64%	New
INS(SCS)	R. Surendran	1,134	1.19%	New
Margin of victory		22,239	23.27%	▲17.97
Turnout		97,487	71.64%	▼5.32
Total valid votes		95,567		
Registered electors		136,072		▲14.06
DMK gain from AIADMK		Swing	▼4.55	

=== 1984 ===
1984 Tamil Nadu Legislative Assembly election : Thiruvallur
Party	Candidate	Votes	%	±%
AIADMK	S. Pattabiraman	44,461	51.73%	▲10.24
DMK	S. R. Munirathinam	39,908	46.43%	New
BJP	M. Loganathan	1,142	1.33%	New
Margin of victory		4,553	5.30%	▼2.33
Turnout		91,815	76.96%	▲12.12
Total valid votes		85,956		
Registered electors		119,300		▲4.90
AIADMK hold		Swing	▲10.24	

=== 1980 ===
1980 Tamil Nadu Legislative Assembly election : Thiruvallur
Party	Candidate	Votes	%	±%
AIADMK	S. Pattabiraman	30,121	41.49%	New
INC	R. Purushothaman	24,585	33.87%	▲29.19
JP	B. Muniratham Naidu	12,560	17.30%	New
Independent	M. Selvaraj	4,794	6.60%	New
Margin of victory		5,536	7.63%	▼4.65
Turnout		73,737	64.84%	▲1.81
Total valid votes		72,595		
Registered electors		113,728		▲4.33
AIADMK gain from AIADMK		Swing	▼3.89	

=== 1977 ===
1977 Tamil Nadu Legislative Assembly election : Thiruvallur
Party	Candidate	Votes	%	±%
AIADMK	S. Pattabiraman	30,670	45.38%	New
JP	Munirathinam Naidu	22,368	33.09%	New
DMK	T. K. Ponnuvelu	7,943	11.75%	▼51.06
INC	T. Gopalan	3,165	4.68%	New
Independent	D. Ethurasan	2,792	4.13%	New
Independent	P. Gopal	651	0.96%	New
Margin of victory		8,302	12.28%	▼19.96
Turnout		68,704	63.03%	▼8.29
Total valid votes		67,589		
Registered electors		109,003		▲19.73
AIADMK gain from DMK		Swing	▼17.43	

=== 1971 ===
1971 Tamil Nadu Legislative Assembly election : Thiruvallur
Party	Candidate	Votes	%	±%
DMK	S. M. Dorairaj	36,496	62.81%	▼3.25
INC	V. S. Arunachalam	17,759	30.56%	New
Independent	Gopal	3,855	6.63%	New
Margin of victory		18,737	32.24%	▼2.92
Turnout		64,934	71.32%	▼2.34
Total valid votes		58,110		
Registered electors		91,042		▲4.18
DMK hold		Swing	▼3.25	

=== 1967 ===
1967 Madras State Legislative Assembly election : Thiruvallur
Party	Candidate	Votes	%	±%
DMK	S. M. Dorairaj	40,687	66.06%	▲26.17
INC	V. S. Arunachalam	19,030	30.90%	▼19.29
Independent	P. Gopal	1,875	3.04%	New
Margin of victory		21,657	35.16%	▲24.86
Turnout		64,372	73.66%	▲12.90
Total valid votes		61,592		
Registered electors		87,391		▲17.54
DMK gain from INC		Swing	▲15.87	

=== 1962 ===
1962 Madras State Legislative Assembly election : Thiruvallur
Party	Candidate	Votes	%	±%
INC	V. S. Arunachalam	21,609	50.19%	▼12.62
DMK	S. M. Dorairaj	17,175	39.89%	New
SWA	M. Dharmalingam	4,269	9.92%	New
Margin of victory		4,434	10.30%	▼9.14
Turnout		45,173	60.76%	▼9.65
Total valid votes		43,053		
Registered electors		74,349		▼56.10
INC hold		Swing	▲16.47	

=== 1957 ===
1957 Madras State Legislative Assembly election : Thiruvallur
Party	Candidate	Votes	%	±%
INC	Eakambara Mudaly	40,214	33.72%	▲2.76
INC	V. S. Arunachalam	34,689	29.09%	▼1.87
Independent	N. Govindasamy Naidu	17,035	14.29%	New
Independent	M. Dharmalingam	7,564	6.34%	New
Independent	K. M. Balu Nayagar	6,001	5.03%	New
Independent	Narayana Nayagar	4,569	3.83%	New
Independent	Sulochana Mudaliar	3,248	2.72%	New
Independent	Joh Sundaram	2,994	2.51%	New
Independent	Dhanarajan	2,930	2.46%	New
Margin of victory		23,179	19.44%	▲8.64
Turnout		119,244	70.41%	▼9.88
Total valid votes		119,244		
Registered electors		169,359		▲11.15
INC gain from KMPP		Swing	▲7.07	

=== 1952 ===
1952 Madras State Legislative Assembly election : Thiruvallur
Party	Candidate	Votes	%	±%
KMPP	M. Dharmalingam	32,599	26.65%	New
KMPP	V. Govindaswamy Naidu	28,462	23.26%	New
INC	N. Egambara Mudaliar	19,392	15.85%	New
INC	V. S. Arunachalam	18,480	15.11%	New
AIFB	N. Govindasamy Naidu	11,502	9.40%	New
RPI	Dharmapillai	8,217	6.72%	New
Independent	J. Mangilal	3,689	3.02%	New
Margin of victory		13,207	10.80%	
Turnout		122,341	80.29%	
Total valid votes		122,341		
Registered electors		152,367		
KMPP win (new seat)				
