= E. S. S. Raman =

Indian politician

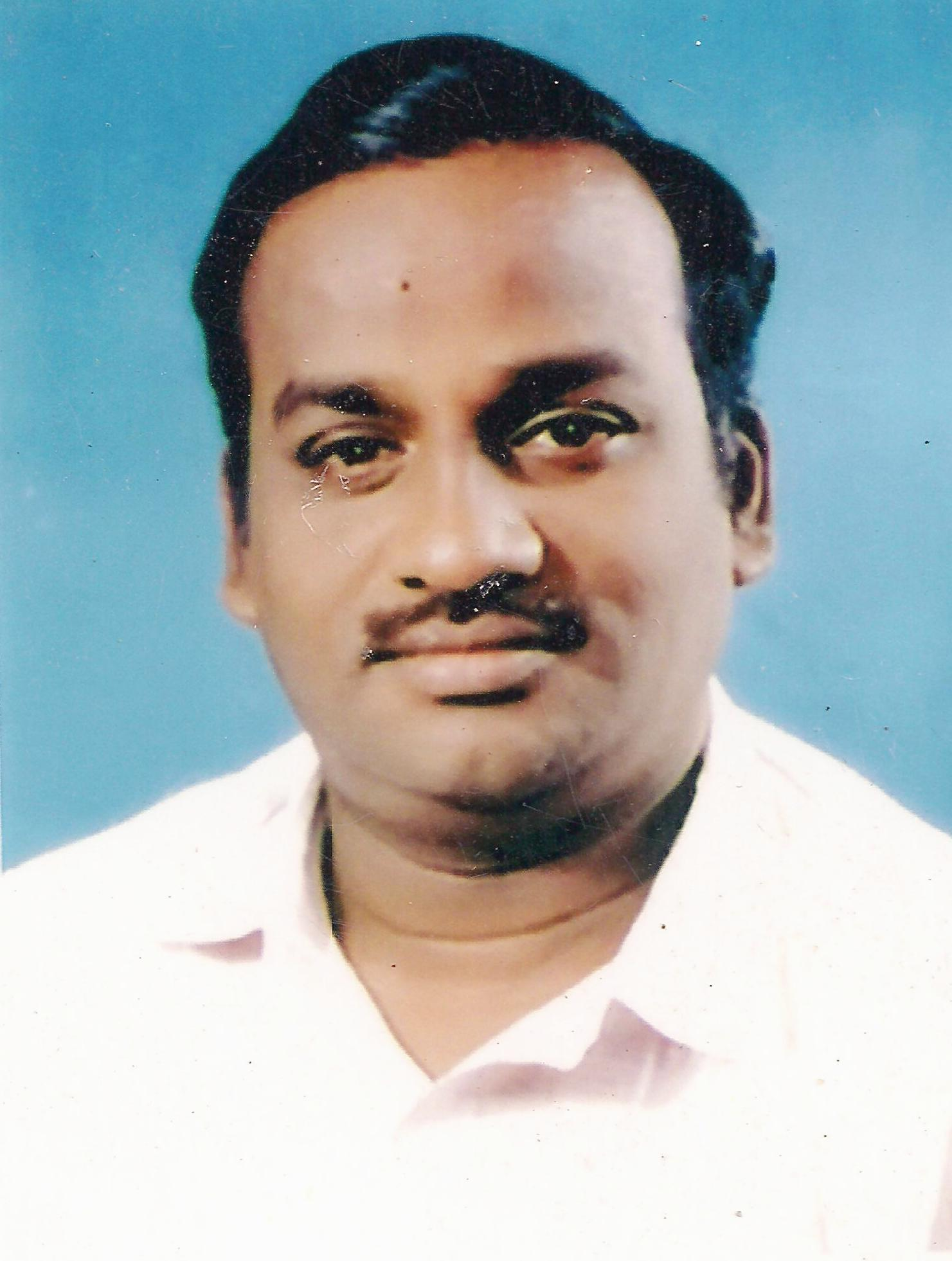
- E. S. S. Raman

Member of Tamil Nadu Legislative Assembly
- In office 11 May 2006 – 13 May 2011
- Preceded by: P. M. Narasimhan
- Succeeded by: constituency switched to Tiruttani constituency
- Constituency: Pallipattu
- In office 9 May 1996 – 13 May 2001
- Preceded by: A. Eakambara Reddy
- Succeeded by: P. M. Narasimhan
- Constituency: Pallipattu

Personal details
- Born: 1 July 1954 (age 72) Pothatturpettai, Thiruvallur District, Tamil Nadu, India
- Party: Tamil Maanila Congress
- Education: Kilpauk Medical College

Ekiri Sanjeevi Subramanya Raman (born 1 July 1954) is an Indian politician with the Tamil Maanila Congress (States Treasurer) and was formerly MLA for Pallipattu constituency in the Tamil Nadu Legislative Assembly. He is a diabetologist in his home town of Pothatturpettai. He represented Pallipattu from 1996–2001 and 2006–2011.

== Early life ==
Raman was born to E. S. Subramanian Mudaliar and Saradha Ammayar from Sengunthar Kaikola Mudaliar (Echaan gothram) family in Pothatturpettai in Thiruvallur district in the state of Tamil Nadu, India. His grandfather, Sanjeeviyar, was the district board member during 1937 for the Chittoor district and the president of the local panchayat (unopposed). His father, a rationalist close to veteran Dravidian movement leaders Periyar E. V. Ramasamy and C. N. Annadurai, was a candidate of behalf of the Tamil People's Party in the first post independence elections in 1952, in which he lost to his nearest rival by 1,021 votes. He was instrumental in getting his father's younger brother E. S. Thyagarajan Mudaliar elected to the Tamil Nadu Legislative Assembly in 1971.

Raman is the only son in his family; he has ten sisters. His family interests covered farming, textile and educational institutions.

== Medical career ==
After graduating in 1978 from Kilpauk Medical College, Chennai, Raman was hired by the Tamil Nadu Public Service Commission as Medical Officer at the government primary health centre in his home town. He headed that from 1978 to 1988, after which he joined Madras Medical College for his post-graduate studies. Later, he joined the faculty of Stanley Medical College and resigned his government job to partake in politics actively.

During his tenure, he implemented a low cost sanitary latrine program known as RCAP. In his jurisdiction, he successfully completed 500 such RCAP latrines without requesting any financial help from the government. For this achievement, the Government of Tamil Nadu nominated Raman for a World Health Organization award in the amount of $US 5,000. He was the first person recommended for said award.

== Political career ==
Raman was district co-convener of the medical wing of the Tamil Nadu Congress Committee from 1989 to 1996. He was a supporter of G. K. Moopanar, political heir of K. Kamaraj. After breaking away from Congress in 1996, Moopanar formed a separate regional political party called the Tamil Maanila Congress (TMC). Raman followed Moopanar and was fielded as the new party candidate for Pallipattu assembly constituency by Moopanar in 1996. Raman won with a margin of 58,492 votes; all his opponents lost their deposits.

Moopanar nominated Raman as the District President of his party (1998–2001). After the death of Moopanar, G. K. Vasan merged TMC with its parent organisation, the Indian National Congress (INC), under the leadership of Sonia Gandhi in 2002. As a follower of Vasan, Raman was appointed the State Organising Secretary for Tamil Nadu Congress Committee (2002 to till date).

Raman served as the District Election Officer for Salem district and Election Observer for Coimbatore and Erode districts (organisational elections) of the TMC. Later after the merger of TMC with INC, Raman served as the High Command Observer for Thanjavur district, the native district of his mentors Moopanar and Vasan, by All India Congress Committee (AICC).

Raman was selected for a second time to contest Pallipattu, this time in the 2006 state assembly elections. He won again. In 2009, Raman was appointed the All India Congress Observer (Pre-Poll −2009) for Andhra Pradesh by Gandhi for three parliamentary constituencies and 21 assembly constituencies (Nandyal, Anantapur and Kurnool parliament constituencies); his observations proved nearly 100% successful and he was lauded for the same.

Raman left the INC when Vasan re-floated the TMC in November 2014. He was appointed as State vice-president of the party in 2015.

=== Elections contested ===
Election	Constituency	Party	Result	Vote %	Runner-up	Runner-up Party	Runner-up vote %	Ref.
2011 Tamil Nadu Legislative Assembly election	Tiruttani	INC	Lost	37.64%	M. Arun Subramanian	DMDK	50.16%	
2006 Tamil Nadu Legislative Assembly election	Pallipet	INC	Won	46.21%	P. M. Narasimhan	AIADMK	40.43%	
1996 Tamil Nadu Legislative Assembly election	Pallipet	TMC	Won	67.03%	B. Thangavel	INC	17.93%	

== Author ==
Raman has written many books in Tamil, namely Isaipada vazhvom, Paalvinai Noigal, Neeryizhivu Noyalikku Vazhakai Muraigal, Naalvar Sutriya Naangu Nadugal, Maruthuvathin Maru Pakkam, and Padhivugal. His book on diabetes won him the first prize from the government of Tamil Nadu for the best Tamil medical book, for which he was given a cash reward and citation by the then Chief Minister, M. G. Ramachandran. The same book was released as an audio cassette, a novel venture at that time, in 1983 for the benefit of patients who can listen better than reading. Raman also wrote a biography of Moopanar in the form of poems with rare photographs of the leader.

Raman has contributed many articles to popular Tamil dailies and other periodicals including Dinamani, Daily Thanthi, Kalki, Manavam, Manavarism, Desiya Murasu and All India Radio. He was a regular writer for Junior Vikatan and Kumudam Reporter, the popular bi-weekly magazines of Tamil Nadu, on Tamil Nadu Assembly proceedings (as a critic) between 2006–2009. He has also worked as a cover artist and illustrator for many magazines including Alai Osai, Manavam, Manarism, Murasoli and Vanoli. He contributed broadcast tributes to the Congress leader Kamaraj on the day of his death.

Raman has travelled widely in and out of India. He undertook a tour to various countries including Hong Kong, Thailand, Malaysia, and Singapore in 1984 and wrote a travelogue on the same. He visited Malaysia and Singapore many other times. He visited the United States in 2011 and participated in the inauguration of a new Joslin Diabetes Center at Pontiac, Illinois.

== Philanthropy ==
Following the example of his ancestors, Raman has established educational institutions in his home town in memory of his father (1909–1977). ESSM Teacher Training Institute, ESSM College of Education, and ESSM College of Arts and Science serve the needs of the locality and particularly benefit the education of women.
