= E. A. P. Sivaji =

Indian politician

E. A. P. Sivaji is an Indian politician and was a Member of the Legislative Assembly (MLA). He was elected to the Tamil Nadu legislative assembly as a Dravida Munnetra Kazhagam (DMK) candidate from Tiruttani constituency in the 1996 election.

Having lost his Tiruttani seat to G. Raviraj of the Pattali Makkal Katchi in 2001, Sivaji stood in the 2006 assembly elections for the Tirvallur constituency at a time when he was district secretary of the DMK in that area. He won the seat then but in the 2011 election he was runner-up to B. V. Ramanaa of the All India Anna Dravida Munnetra Kazhagam.

== Electoral performance ==
2011 Tamil Nadu Legislative Assembly election : Thiruvallur
Party	Candidate	Votes	%	±%
AIADMK	B. V. Ramanaa	91,337	53.69%	▲12.22
DMK	E. A. P. Sivaji	67,689	39.79%	▼8.35
Puratchi Bharatham	E. James	2,220	1.30%	New
BJP	R. M. R. Janakiraman	1,869	1.10%	▲0.28
RJD	T. A. Deivasigamani	1,080	0.63%	New
BSP	V. Shanthakumar	1,039	0.61%	▲0.07
Margin of victory		23,648	13.90%	▲7.23
Total valid votes		170,115		
Rejected ballots		554	0.00%	
Registered electors		207,935		▲10.25
AIADMK gain from DMK		Swing	▲5.55	

2006 Tamil Nadu Legislative Assembly election : Thiruvallur
Party	Candidate	Votes	%	±%
DMK	E. A. P. Sivaji	64,378	48.14%	New
AIADMK	B. V. Ramanaa	55,454	41.47%	New
DMDK	B. Paratha Sarathi	8,048	6.02%	New
Independent	S. Jegajeevanram	1,413	1.06%	New
BJP	R. S. Veeramani	1,092	0.82%	New
Independent	M. Vasan	885	0.66%	New
Margin of victory		8,924	6.67%	▼11.20
Turnout		133,734	70.91%	▲13.11
Total valid votes		133,732		
Registered electors		188,609		▼2.48
DMK gain from TMC(M)		Swing	▲5.24	

2001 Tamil Nadu Legislative Assembly election : Tiruttani
Party	Candidate	Votes	%	±%
PMK	G. Eraviraj	58,549	50.01	▲38.03
DMK	E. A. P. Sivaji	44,675	38.16	▼15.74
Puratchi Bharatham	G. Mahalingam	7,412	6.33	New
MDMK	N. S. Dharman	2,406	2.06	▼3.18
Independent	A. Jayaraman	1,499	1.28	New
Independent	D. Munirathinam	877	0.75	New
Margin of victory		13,874	11.85	▼15.58
Turnout		117,063	67.29	▼2.40
Total valid votes		117,063		
Registered electors		173,980		▲7.05
PMK gain from DMK		Swing	▼3.89	

1996 Tamil Nadu Legislative Assembly election : Tiruttani
Party	Candidate	Votes	%	±%
DMK	E. A. P. Sivaji	58,049	53.90	New
AIADMK	G. Hari	28,507	26.47	New
PMK	G. Eraviraj	12,896	11.98	▼1.64
MDMK	Narasimhan	5,638	5.24	New
BJP	M. Krishnamoorthy	815	0.76	▼0.21
Margin of victory		29,542	27.43	▲3.83
Turnout		113,258	69.69	▲4.47
Total valid votes		107,691		
Registered electors		162,521		▲5.87
DMK gain from AIADMK		Swing	▲0.70	
