= R. Chakarapani =

Indian politician

R. Chakrapani

legislative Assembly , Tamil Nadu legislative
- In office 1980–1984
- Preceded by: S. M. Durairaj
- Succeeded by: Sekar alias K . P. Kulasekaran
- Constituency: Ponneri

Personal details
- Born: 4 June 1946 Vallur
- Party: India Anna Dravida Munnetra Kazhagam (AIADMK)
- Profession: Farmer

R. Chakrapani is an Indian politician and a former member of the Tamil Nadu Legislative Assembly. He hails from Ponneri, Thiruvallur district. Born in Vallur, Chakrapani studied at TVS Reddy High School. He was a member of the All India Anna Dravida Munnetra Kazhagam (AIADMK) and was elected to the Tamil Nadu Legislative Assembly in the 1980 Tamil Nadu Legislative Assembly election.

== Electoral performance ==
=== 1980 ===
1980 Tamil Nadu Legislative Assembly election: Ponneri
Party	Candidate	Votes	%	±%
AIADMK	R. Chakarapani	42,408	51.07%	+8.43
DMK	P. Nagalingam	27,490	33.11%	+5.58
Independent	G. Vetriveeran	7,508	9.04%	New
JP	R. S. Munivel	4,619	5.56%	New
Margin of victory		14,918	17.97%	2.85%
Turnout		83,033	62.40%	5.89%
Registered electors		1,35,012		
AIADMK hold		Swing	8.43%	
