= M. Jagan Moorthy =

Indian politician

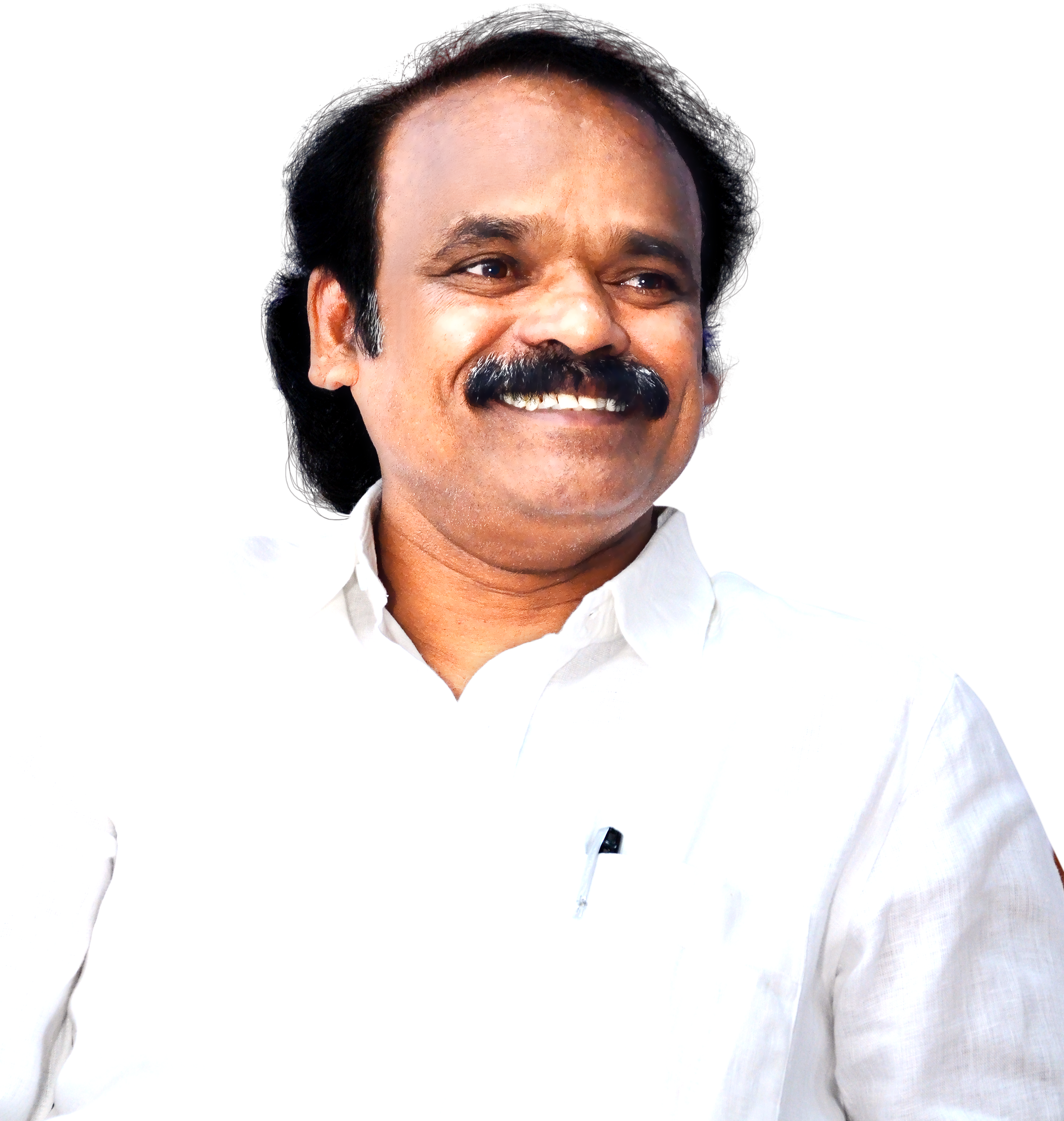

Member of Tamil Nadu legislative assembly
- In office 2 May 2021 – 6 May 2026
- Preceded by: G. Loganathan
- Succeeded by: E. Thenral Kumar
- Constituency: K. V. Kuppam
- In office 11 May 2006 – 13 May 2011
- Preceded by: K. Bhavani Karunakaran
- Succeeded by: S. Ravi
- Constituency: Arakkonam

President of Puratchi Bharatham Katchi
- Incumbent
- Assumed office 7 September 2002
- Preceded by: Poovai M. Moorthy

Personal details
- Born: 10 May 1966 (age 60) Andersonpettai, Poonamallee, Madras State (now in Thiruvallur District, Tamil Nadu), India
- Party: Puratchi Bharatham Katchi

M . Jagan Moorthy (born 10 May 1966) is an Indian politician and social activist from Tamil Nadu, India. He served as a Member of the Legislative Assembly from K. V. Kuppam in Vellore District, Tamil Nadu. Further, he lost the May 2026 State Assembly elections to TVK. He is the current President of the Puratchi Bharatham Katchi (PBK), a political party rooted in Ambedkarite ideology that that aims to represent and uplift Dalits in Tamil Nadu. Moorthy became the president of the PBK on 7 September 2002, with the unanimous support of senior party executives.

In 2006, Moorthy formed an alliance with the DMK front, contesting and winning Arakkonam seat. He later supported the AIADMK-led alliance in the 2016 Tamil Nadu Legislative Assembly election. He would remain in the alliance for the 2021 Tamil Nadu Legislative Assembly election, and contest and win from K. V. Kuppam constituency.

== Electoral performance ==
Election	Constituency	Political party	Result	Vote %	Opposition			Ref
Election	Constituency	Political party	Result	Vote %	Candidate	Political party	Vote %	Ref
2006	Arakkonam	DMK	Won	47.17%	S. Ravi	AIADMK	41.79%	
