= Pallipattu Assembly constituency =

Coordinates: 13.33°N 79.45°E

Pallipet
- Former constituency for the Tamil Nadu Legislative Assembly

Constituency details
- Country: India
- Region: South India
- State: Tamil Nadu
- District: Thiruvallur
- Established: 1977
- Abolished: 2008
- Total electors: 1,73,462

Pallipattu is a state assembly constituency in Tamil Nadu. Elections and winners in the constituency are listed below.

== Members of the Legislative Assembly ==
Year	Winner	Party
1977	Ekambara Reddy	Indian National Congress
1980	P. M. Narasimhan	All India Anna Dravida Munnetra Kazhagam
1984	P. M. Narasimhan	All India Anna Dravida Munnetra Kazhagam
1989	A. Eakambara Reddy	Indian National Congress
1991	A. Eakambara Reddy	Indian National Congress
1996	E. S. S. Raman	Tamil Maanila Congress
2001	P. M. Narasimhan	All India Anna Dravida Munnetra Kazhagam
2006	E. S. S. Raman	Indian National Congress

== Election results ==
Vote share of winning candidates
2006	46.21%
2001	49.42%
1996	67.03%
1991	50.24%
1989	30.46%
1984	39.96%
1980	35.03%
1977	33.62%

=== 2006 ===
2006 Tamil Nadu Legislative Assembly election: Pallipet
Party	Candidate	Votes	%	±%
INC	E. S. S. Raman	58,534	46.21%	
AIADMK	P. M. Narasimhan	51,219	40.43%	−8.99%
DMDK	V. Nethaji	10,957	8.65%	
Independent	A. Velu	1,490	1.18%	
BJP	R. Radhakrishnan	1,336	1.05%	−25.96%
Independent	S. Ponramar	1,195	0.94%	
Independent	G. V. Ravi	648	0.51%	
Independent	V. G. Kumar	424	0.33%	
LJP	T. D. Vinayagam	282	0.22%	
Independent	M. Ramesh Kumar	257	0.20%	
Independent	S. Sreenivasalu	174	0.14%	
Margin of victory		7,315	5.77%	−16.63%
Turnout		126,680	73.03%	4.43%
Registered electors		173,462		
INC gain from AIADMK		Swing	-3.22%	

=== 2001 ===
2001 Tamil Nadu Legislative Assembly election: Pallipet
Party	Candidate	Votes	%	±%
AIADMK	P. M. Narasimhan	62,289	49.42%	
BJP	M. Chakravarthy	34,049	27.02%	26.35%
Independent	P. A. Vinayagam	26,081	20.69%	
Puratchi Bharatham	G. Sankaran	1,558	1.24%	
RJD	M. Gajendran	780	0.62%	
Independent	D. Panchatcharam	647	0.51%	
Independent	M. S. Govindasamy Muthiraiyar Alias Govindasamy	375	0.30%	
LJP	A. K. Thiruvengadam	258	0.20%	
Margin of victory		28,240	22.41%	−26.70%
Turnout		126,037	68.60%	−8.02%
Registered electors		183,742		
AIADMK gain from TMC(M)		Swing	-17.61%	

=== 1996 ===
1996 Tamil Nadu Legislative Assembly election: Pallipet
Party	Candidate	Votes	%	±%
TMC(M)	E. S. S. Raman	79,848	67.03%	
INC	B. Thangavel	21,356	17.93%	−32.31%
MDMK	K. S. Athyaraj	11,200	9.40%	
PMK	Dalit P. D. Selvam	5,238	4.40%	
BJP	A. M. Govindaswamy	788	0.66%	
Independent	M. Ravi	174	0.15%	
Independent	J. John Joshi	126	0.11%	
Independent	M. Arumugam	119	0.10%	
Independent	D. Narayanaswamy	106	0.09%	
Independent	J. Arbutharaj	100	0.08%	
Independent	B. Prakash	62	0.05%	
Margin of victory		58,492	49.10%	17.27%
Turnout		119,117	76.62%	11.50%
Registered electors		160,107		
TMC(M) gain from INC		Swing	16.79%	

=== 1991 ===
1991 Tamil Nadu Legislative Assembly election: Pallipet
Party	Candidate	Votes	%	±%
INC	A. Eakambara Reddy	48,516	50.24%	19.78%
Independent	L. S. Annamalai	17,776	18.41%	
DMK	T. Lokanathan	14,845	15.37%	
PMK	C. Thiyagarajank	9,384	9.72%	
Independent	V. M. Pandiyank	293	0.30%	
Independent	S. Lesavan	229	0.24%	
Independent	K. K. Raja	208	0.22%	
JP	R. Suryanarayanan	190	0.20%	
Independent	S. K. Nagarathinam	147	0.15%	
Independent	A. M. Gurunathan	105	0.11%	
Independent	G. K. Krishnan	93	0.10%	
Margin of victory		30,740	31.83%	27.45%
Turnout		96,565	65.12%	−8.36%
Registered electors		152,410		
INC hold		Swing	19.78%	

=== 1989 ===
1989 Tamil Nadu Legislative Assembly election: Pallipet
Party	Candidate	Votes	%	±%
INC	A. Eakambara Reddy	30,417	30.46%	
AIADMK	P. M. Narasimhan	26,040	26.07%	−13.88%
AIADMK	E. M. Swaminathan	24,985	25.02%	−14.94%
JP	V. Loganathan	18,424	18.45%	
{{{party}}}	{{{candidate}}}	{{{votes}}}	{{{percentage}}}	
Margin of victory		4,377	4.38%	−2.72%
Turnout		99,866	73.49%	−3.10%
Registered electors		138,436		
INC gain from AIADMK		Swing	-9.50%	

=== 1984 ===
1984 Tamil Nadu Legislative Assembly election: Pallipet
Party	Candidate	Votes	%	±%
AIADMK	P. M. Narasimhan	34,935	39.96%	4.93%
Independent	A. Bakambaram	28,724	32.85%	
Independent	P. Chinni Krishniah	23,770	27.19%	
Margin of victory		6,211	7.10%	6.56%
Turnout		87,429	76.59%	9.09%
Registered electors		120,983		
AIADMK hold		Swing	4.93%	

=== 1980 ===
1980 Tamil Nadu Legislative Assembly election: Pallipet
Party	Candidate	Votes	%	±%
AIADMK	P. M. Narasimhan	26,377	35.03%	7.54%
INC	A. Eakambara Reddy	25,967	34.48%	0.86%
Independent	E. M. Swaminathan	22,964	30.49%	
Margin of victory		410	0.54%	−5.59%
Turnout		75,308	67.50%	3.31%
Registered electors		113,473		
AIADMK gain from INC		Swing	1.40%	

=== 1977 ===
1977 Tamil Nadu Legislative Assembly election: Pallipet
Party	Candidate	Votes	%	±%
INC	A. Eakambara Reddy	23,480	33.62%	
AIADMK	K. M. Balaraman	19,194	27.49%	
DMK	N. K. S. Ganesan	17,252	24.71%	
JP	A. Aswatha	7,195	10.30%	
Independent	Y. Munuswamy	2,449	3.51%	
Independent	C. Rajagopal	260	0.37%	
Margin of victory		4,286	6.14%	
Turnout		69,830	64.19%	
Registered electors		110,571		
INC win (new seat)				
