= Tiruttani Assembly constituency =

State Legislative Assembly Constituency in Tamil Nadu

Coordinates: 13°10′25.78″N 79°34′13.80″E

Tiruttani
- Constituency No. 3 for the Tamil Nadu Legislative Assembly

Constituency details
- Country: India
- Region: South India
- State: Tamil Nadu
- District: Tiruvallur
- Lok Sabha constituency: Arakkonam
- Established: 1951
- Total electors: 261,857
- Reservation: None

Member of Legislative Assembly
- 17th Tamil Nadu Legislative Assembly
- Incumbent G. Hari
- Party: AIADMK
- Alliance: NDA
- Elected year: 2026

Tiruttani Assembly Constituency is a state assembly constituency in Tiruvallur district in Tamil Nadu. Its State Assembly constituency number is 3. It consists of Pallipattu taluk and a portion of Tiruttani taluk. It falls under Arakkonam Lok Sabha constituency. It is one of the 234 state legislative assembly constituencies in Tamil Nadu, India. Elections and winners in the constituency are listed below.

== Demographics ==
Demographics (2016)
Category	Data
Created	2016
Sengundhar Kaikola Mudaliyar	27.40%
Vanniyar	23.75%
Adi Dravida	16.45%
Kamma Naidu, Kapu	12.42%
Others	22%
Total Electorate	2,73,660

== Members of the Legislative Assembly ==
Election	Member	Party
1952	Kidambi Varadachari	Indian National Congress
1952	M. Dorai Kannu	Indian National Congress
1955	Gopalu Reddy	Indian National Congress
1955	M. Dorai Kannu	Indian National Congress
1962	C. Chinrajeevulu Naidu	Independent politician
1967	K. Vinayakam	Indian National Congress
1971	E. S. Thyagarajan	Dravida Munnetra Kazhagam
1977	R. Shanmugam	All India Anna Dravida Munnetra Kazhagam
1980	R. Shanmugam	All India Anna Dravida Munnetra Kazhagam
1984	R. Shanmugam	All India Anna Dravida Munnetra Kazhagam
1989	P. Natarajan	Dravida Munnetra Kazhagam
1991	K. Rasanbabu	All India Anna Dravida Munnetra Kazhagam
1996	E. A. P. Sivaji	Dravida Munnetra Kazhagam
2001	G. Eraviraj	Pattali Makkal Katchi
2006	G. Hari	All India Anna Dravida Munnetra Kazhagam
2011	M. Arun Subramanian	Desiya Murpokku Dravida Kazhagam
2016	P. M. Narasimhan	All India Anna Dravida Munnetra Kazhagam
2021	S. Chandran	Dravida Munnetra Kazhagam
2026	G. Hari	All India Anna Dravida Munnetra Kazhagam

Madras State
Andhra State

== Election results ==
Vote share of winning candidates
2026	37.34%
2021	52.09%
2016	41.84%
2011	50.16%
2006	43.09%
2001	50.01%
1996	53.90%
1991	53.20%
1989	41.88%
1984	50.48%
1980	49.60%
1977	43.68%
1971	61.72%
1967	40.34%
1962	50.51%
1952	19.57%

=== 2026 ===
2026 Tamil Nadu Legislative Assembly election : Tiruttani
Party	Candidate	Votes	%	±%
AIADMK	G. Hari	89,169	37.34	▼2.09
TVK	M. Sathya Kumar	83,376	34.91	New
DMDK	D. Krishnamurthy	54,863	22.97	▲21.27
NTK	Chandran .S. S	6,704	2.81	▼2.39
NOTA	None of the above	1,210	0.51	▼0.21
Margin of victory		5,793	2.43	▼10.24
Turnout		239,451	91.22	▲11.17
Total valid votes		238,798		
Registered electors		262,500		▼9.90
AIADMK gain from DMK		Swing	▼14.75	

=== 2021 ===
2021 Tamil Nadu Legislative Assembly election : Tiruttani
Party	Candidate	Votes	%	±%
DMK	S. Chandran	120,314	52.09	New
AIADMK	G. Hari	91,061	39.43	▼2.41
NTK	L. Akila	12,007	5.20	▲4.72
DMDK	D. Krishnamoorthi	3,928	1.70	▼5.34
NOTA	None of the above	1,665	0.72	▼0.21
Margin of victory		29,253	12.67	▲2.27
Turnout		233,222	80.05	▼0.89
Total valid votes		230,959		
Rejected ballots		598	0.26	▲0.25
Registered electors		291,336		▲6.01
DMK gain from AIADMK		Swing	▲10.25	

=== 2016 ===
2016 Tamil Nadu Legislative Assembly election : Tiruttani
Party	Candidate	Votes	%	±%
AIADMK	P. M. Narasimhan	93,045	41.84	New
INC	A. G. Chidambaram	69,904	31.43	▼6.21
PMK	A. Vaithilingam	29,596	13.31	New
DMDK	D. Krishnamurthy	15,648	7.04	▼43.12
BJP	M. Chakravarthy	5,525	2.48	▲1.72
NOTA	None of the above	2,076	0.93	New
BSP	S. Jaibaskaran	1,445	0.65	▼0.32
Margin of victory		23,141	10.40	▼2.11
Turnout		222,431	80.94	▲80.94
Total valid votes		222,409		
Rejected ballots		22	0.01	
Registered electors		274,818		▲16.09
AIADMK gain from DMDK		Swing	▼8.32	

=== 2011 ===
2011 Tamil Nadu Legislative Assembly election : Tiruttani
Party	Candidate	Votes	%	±%
DMDK	M. Arun Subramanian	95,918	50.16	▲40.96
INC	E. S. S. Raman	71,988	37.64	New
JMM	A. K. Subramani	9,760	5.10	New
Independent	S. Rambai	3,232	1.69	New
BSP	D. Dass	1,859	0.97	▲0.72
Independent	M. Ramesh Kumar	1,524	0.80	New
BJP	J. Babu	1,450	0.76	▼0.10
Puratchi Bharatham	J. Ramesh	1,296	0.68	New
Independent	N. D. Suresh Babu	1,242	0.65	New
Margin of victory		23,930	12.51	▲11.76
Total valid votes		191,237		
Rejected ballots		14	0.00	
Registered electors		236,733		▲43.66
DMDK gain from AIADMK		Swing	▲7.07	

=== 2006 ===
2006 Tamil Nadu Legislative Assembly election : Tiruttani
Party	Candidate	Votes	%	±%
AIADMK	G. Hari	52,871	43.09	New
PMK	G. Eraviraj	51,955	42.35	▼7.66
DMDK	R. Sekar	11,293	9.20	New
Independent	D. Rajapandiyan	1,965	1.60	New
BJP	P. Siranjeevulu	1,051	0.86	New
Independent	G. Raghu	874	0.71	New
Margin of victory		916	0.75	▼11.10
Turnout		122,823	74.53	▲7.24
Total valid votes		122,687		
Registered electors		164,790		▼5.28
AIADMK gain from PMK		Swing	▼6.92	

=== 2001 ===
2001 Tamil Nadu Legislative Assembly election : Tiruttani
Party	Candidate	Votes	%	±%
PMK	G. Eraviraj	58,549	50.01	▲38.03
DMK	E. A. P. Sivaji	44,675	38.16	▼15.74
Puratchi Bharatham	G. Mahalingam	7,412	6.33	New
MDMK	N. S. Dharman	2,406	2.06	▼3.18
Independent	A. Jayaraman	1,499	1.28	New
Independent	D. Munirathinam	877	0.75	New
Margin of victory		13,874	11.85	▼15.58
Turnout		117,063	67.29	▼2.40
Total valid votes		117,063		
Registered electors		173,980		▲7.05
PMK gain from DMK		Swing	▼3.89	

=== 1996 ===
1996 Tamil Nadu Legislative Assembly election : Tiruttani
Party	Candidate	Votes	%	±%
DMK	E. A. P. Sivaji	58,049	53.90	New
AIADMK	G. Hari	28,507	26.47	New
PMK	G. Eraviraj	12,896	11.98	▼1.64
MDMK	Narasimhan	5,638	5.24	New
BJP	M. Krishnamoorthy	815	0.76	▼0.21
Margin of victory		29,542	27.43	▲3.83
Turnout		113,258	69.69	▲4.47
Total valid votes		107,691		
Registered electors		162,521		▲5.87
DMK gain from AIADMK		Swing	▲0.70	

=== 1991 ===
1991 Tamil Nadu Legislative Assembly election : Tiruttani
Party	Candidate	Votes	%	±%
AIADMK	K. Rasanbabu Alias Thanigai Babu	50,037	53.20	New
JD	C. Chinrajeevulu Naidu	27,845	29.61	New
PMK	E. Murthy	12,808	13.62	New
Independent	V. Thullukkanam Naidu	1,820	1.94	New
BJP	D. Premchand	916	0.97	New
Margin of victory		22,192	23.60	▲12.85
Turnout		100,112	65.22	▲2.37
Total valid votes		94,046		
Registered electors		153,507		▲11.10
AIADMK gain from DMK		Swing	▲11.32	

=== 1989 ===
1989 Tamil Nadu Legislative Assembly election : Tiruttani
Party	Candidate	Votes	%	±%
DMK	P. Natarajan	35,555	41.88	New
AIADMK	Munu Adhi	26,432	31.14	New
INC	Ramakrishnan Manali	15,329	18.06	New
AIADMK	G. Jayaraman	5,485	6.46	New
Margin of victory		9,123	10.75	▲5.99
Turnout		86,844	62.85	▼12.19
Total valid votes		84,888		
Registered electors		138,174		▲16.40
DMK gain from AIADMK		Swing	▼8.60	

=== 1984 ===
1984 Tamil Nadu Legislative Assembly election : Tiruttani
Party	Candidate	Votes	%	±%
AIADMK	R. Shanmugam	41,669	50.48	▲0.88
JP	C. Chinrajeevulu Naidu	37,740	45.72	New
Independent	K. S. Arjunan	2,507	3.04	New
Independent	M. Chockalingam	632	0.77	New
Margin of victory		3,929	4.76	▼9.20
Turnout		89,074	75.04	▲9.09
Total valid votes		82,548		
Registered electors		118,704		▲6.45
AIADMK hold		Swing	▲0.88	

=== 1980 ===
1980 Tamil Nadu Legislative Assembly election : Tiruttani
Party	Candidate	Votes	%	±%
AIADMK	R. Shanmugam	35,845	49.60	New
INC	T. Namashivayam	25,754	35.64	▲32.28
JP	C. Chinrajeevulu Naidu	8,967	12.41	New
Independent	P. V. Shambugam	1,456	2.01	New
Margin of victory		10,091	13.96	▼1.54
Turnout		73,548	65.95	▲0.26
Total valid votes		72,270		
Registered electors		111,514		▲8.29
AIADMK gain from AIADMK		Swing	▲5.92	

=== 1977 ===
1977 Tamil Nadu Legislative Assembly election : Tiruttani
Party	Candidate	Votes	%	±%
AIADMK	R. Shanmugam	29,070	43.68	New
DMK	A. B. Ramachandran	18,754	28.18	▼33.54
JP	C. Subbarayalu	13,540	20.35	New
INC	D. S. Varadaraj	2,236	3.36	New
Independent	R. Narayanadu Alias Narayanadoss	1,788	2.69	New
Independent	C. Radhakrishna Reddy	808	1.21	New
Margin of victory		10,316	15.50	▼7.94
Turnout		67,645	65.69	▼7.54
Total valid votes		66,547		
Registered electors		102,979		▼0.09
AIADMK gain from DMK		Swing	▼18.04	

=== 1971 ===
1971 Tamil Nadu Legislative Assembly election : Tiruttani
Party	Candidate	Votes	%	±%
DMK	E. S. Thyagarajan	43,436	61.72	▲24.04
INC	A. Ekambara Reddy	26,938	38.28	New
Margin of victory		16,498	23.44	▲20.78
Turnout		75,479	73.23	▲0.82
Total valid votes		70,374		
Registered electors		103,073		▲2.83
DMK gain from INC		Swing	▲21.38	

=== 1967 ===
1967 Madras State Legislative Assembly election : Tiruttani
Party	Candidate	Votes	%	±%
INC	K. Vinayakam	27,123	40.34	▼6.47
DMK	V. K. Kuppuswamy	25,337	37.68	New
Independent	G. Desappan	14,777	21.98	New
Margin of victory		1,786	2.66	▼1.05
Turnout		72,576	72.41	▼6.00
Total valid votes		67,237		
Registered electors		100,232		▲2.34
INC gain from Independent		Swing	▼10.17	

=== 1962 ===
1962 Madras State Legislative Assembly election : Tiruttani
Party	Candidate	Votes	%	±%
Independent	C. Chinrajeevulu Naidu	36,884	50.51	New
INC	E. S. Thyagarajan	34,176	46.81	▼4.49
Independent	Ismail	1,957	2.68	New
Margin of victory		2,708	3.71	▼8.32
Turnout		76,802	78.41	▲17.36
Total valid votes		73,017		
Registered electors		97,943		▼13.21
Independent gain from INC		Swing	▼0.79	

=== 1955 ===
1955 Andhra state Legislative Assembly election : Tiruttani
Party	Candidate	Votes	%	±%
INC	Gopalu Reddy	35,350	51.30	▲14.73
Independent	E. S. Thyagaraja Mudali	27,059	39.27	New
CPI	Bhimireddy Venkataramana Reddy	6,493	9.42	New
INC	M. Dorai Kannu			
Margin of victory		8,291	12.03	▲8.64
Turnout		68,902	61.05	▼23.78
Total valid votes		68,902		
Registered electors		112,854		▼22.95
INC hold		Swing	▲31.73	

=== 1952 ===
1952 Madras State Legislative Assembly election : Tiruttani
Party	Candidate	Votes	%	±%
INC	Kidambi Varadachari	24,312	19.57	New
INC	M. Dorai Kannu	21,125	17.00	New
Independent	E. Subramaiah Mudali	20,104	16.18	New
Independent	G. Doraiswami Naiudu	16,527	13.30	New
Independent	D. Muniratnam Naiudu	13,096	10.54	New
KMPP	K. C. Veerabaraju	12,531	10.08	New
Independent	S. G. Varadarajulu Mudali	10,002	8.05	New
Independent	M. Vadivelu	6,558	5.28	New
Margin of victory		4,208	3.39	
Turnout		124,255	84.83	
Total valid votes		124,255		
Registered electors		146,477		
INC win (new seat)				
