= Deva (composer) =

Indian film composer and singer (1950–2026)

- Deva in 2024

Background information
- Also known as: Thenisai Thendral; Godfather of Gaana
- Born: Devanesan Chokkalingam; 20 November 1950; Mylapore, Madras, Madras State, India
- Died: 17 October 2026 (aged 75) Chennai, Tamil Nadu, India
- Occupations: Film composer, music director
- Instruments: Vocals, guitar, keyboard, harmonium, piano
- Works: List of works
- Years active: 1988–2026

Devanesan Chokkalingam (20 November 1950 – 17 October 2026), popularly known as Deva, was an Indian composer and singer who predominantly worked in Tamil cinema. He composed songs and provided background music for Tamil, Kannada, Telugu, and Malayalam films in a career that spanned nearly four decades.

Deva composed music for more than 400 films. He was widely credited for bringing Gaana music into mainstream films in India and was nicknamed the "Godfather of Gaana music" and "Thenisai Thendral”. Although he is notable for his Gaana music contributions, Deva was also known for his melody music.

== Early life ==
Devanesan Chokkalingam was born in Mylapore, Madras, on 20 November 1950. He developed an interest in music through exposure to public performances and later taught himself the harmonium while working in the Tamil theatre circuit. He was associated with stage musicians such as Kamesh and Rajamani, initially working in a non-musical capacity before becoming a performer.

== Career ==
In 1973, he co-founded a musical troupe with composer Chandrabose.

After an early, partial involvement in film projects, Deva briefly stepped away from cinema. During this period, Deva worked at Doordarshan Podhigai channel and composed songs for the show Vayalum Vaazhvum. He learned piano under Dhanraj Master—who also taught Illayaraja—and studied Indian classical music on the harmonium under J. B. Krishna. By the 1980s, he began composing devotional albums and produced several hundred such works. Deva's brothers Sabesh and Murali meanwhile worked in the musical troupes of Illayaraja and other music directors as instrumentalists. They played a significant role in introducing him to the film industry. Deva often credited his brothers with his career, stating that his recognition as a composer was closely tied to their support and collaboration.

A turning point in his career came in 1985, when veteran composer M. S. Viswanathan publicly praised his work at a felicitation event held at the Tiruverkadu Temple, where Deva was being honoured for composing a large number of devotional albums. During his speech, Viswanathan urged the industry to offer Deva opportunities in cinema, stating that he had the potential to make a significant impact, and also conferred on him the title “Thenisai Thendral” (“breeze of sweet music”). Within months of this event, Deva received his first major film opportunity. He later recalled seeking Viswanathan's guidance at the start of his film career. Deva maintained a close professional and personal association with Viswanathan, who is noted to have followed his work and offered feedback on his compositions. As a mark of respect and gratitude, Deva invited Viswanathan to contribute as a singer in one of his early films, Vaidehi Vanthachu (1991).

Deva made his debut as a full-fledged composer in Tamil cinema with Mattukkara Mannaru (1986). His first major star film, Manasukketha Maharasa, was released in 1989. He was then called to work on the movie Vaigasi Poranthachu. In 1992, Deva composed music for Annaamalai, starring Rajinikanth and produced by K. Balachander. Deva continued his collaboration with Rajinikanth in films such as Baashha (1995) and Arunachalam (1997), where he composed introductory songs and background scores designed to enhance the actor's mass appeal. These compositions are characterised by high-energy rhythms and strong melodic hooks intended to create an immediate audience response.

Throughout the 1990s, Deva was among the most prolific composers in Tamil cinema. In 1996 alone, Deva composed tunes for 36 films. His scores played a big role in the emergence of actors Ajith Kumar and Vijay, with hits such as Aasai (1995), Kadhal Kottai (1996), Nerrukku Ner (1997), Ninaithen Vandhai (1998), Priyamudan (1998), Vaalee (1999), Kushi (2000) helping them establish themselves as the next-generation superstars.

He was widely associated with the popularisation of the Gaana genre in Tamil cinema. Drawing from musical forms prevalent in North Chennai, he incorporated gaana elements into film songs and contributed to their wider acceptance in mainstream cinema. His efforts over several years are noted for helping bring a previously localised musical style into broader commercial circulation.

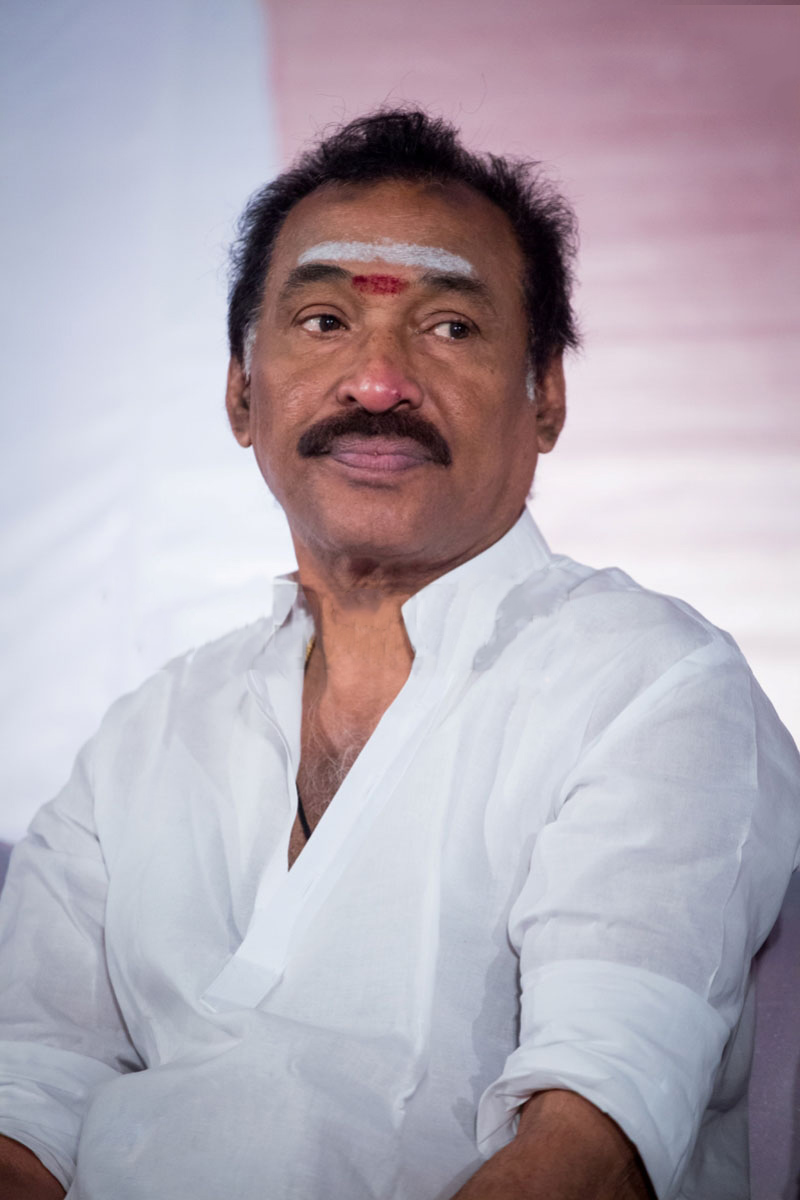
Deva in 2015

Deva was also noted for his collaborative approach within the industry. Deva frequently worked with mentors, contemporaries, and other composers, and invited several of them to contribute as singers in his compositions. Conversely, he himself rendered vocals in numerous songs for other music directors. He was regarded as one of the most prolific music directors in Tamil cinema to have also sung extensively across his own and others’ compositions.

Deva's compositional style has been described as prioritising simplicity, immediacy, and memorability, with particular emphasis on the pallavi (refrain). While not always adhering strictly to classical frameworks, his works often incorporated elements of Carnatic music alongside folk and contemporary influences. He was known for his speed of composition, occasionally completing songs within short timeframes to meet production schedules. He also adapted to changing musical trends during the 1990s and 2000s, at times incorporating styles popularised by other composers while maintaining his own mass-oriented approach.

Some of his works have attracted criticism for similarities to pre-existing tunes, particularly in cases where compositions were influenced by reference tracks provided during production. Deva and his brothers have acknowledged such practices as part of industry demands, while maintaining that his compositions involved adaptation and modification rather than direct replication.

Deva's music attained international recognition after the former President of Singapore, S. R. Nathan, requested Deva’s song "Thanjavuru Mannu Eduthu"from the 1997 film Porkkaalam to be played at his state funeral service in 2016. However, this was not telecasted anywhere in India.

Over the course of his career, Deva composed music for more than 400 films across Tamil, Kannada, Telugu, and Malayalam cinema, in addition to a substantial body of devotional music. In 2014, Anirudh Ravichander chose Deva to sing a gaana song in his album Maan Karate. In 2023, Deva collaborated with lyricist Alpha Something and game developer Visai Games to create a song for the video game Venba, drawing heavily from themes of Tamil culture.

Indian music researcher Karthik Srinivasan, through his music plagiarism tracking site Itwofs, alleged that in 22 instances between 1992 and 2003 some of Deva's songs were said to be "lifted", "copied", "based", or "inspired" from those of tunes by other musicians, including Dr. Alban. In articles Karthik wrote for Film Companion, he noted that films such as the Telugu film Tholi Prema (1998) and Mugavaree (2000) feature several songs that were reused from international artists. In response to criticism of "copying" songs, Deva replied that he would simply compose based on what directors would want from him with the songs they provide. Regarding the song "Oh Nenje" from Mugavaree interpolating "Get Down" by Backstreet Boys, Deva said he assumed it was a 10-year old song when he was provided it, adding that while he may have lifted a few portions of that song, "Oh Nenje" was mostly original.

== Personal life and death ==
Deva's son Srikanth Deva is also a music composer, as are his brothers, who have formed the duo Sabesh–Murali. His nephew Jai is an actor and occasional music composer.

Deva died from a sudden cardiac arrest at Surya Hospital in Kodambakkam, Chennai on 17 October 2026 at the age of 75. His funeral was held the next day in Chennai with state honors. He was later buried at his garden in the Ranipet district of Chakkramallur.

== Legacy ==
Following his death, The Hollywood Reporter noted Deva as "one of the most prolific composers in Tamil cinema" and one of Tamil cinema's "greatest-ever composers". The Times of India called Deva one of Tamil cinema's "most distinctive music composers" and attributed his works to help bring Chennai’s gaana music into mainstream films. The Hindustan Times regarded Deva as a "legendary composer".

== Awards ==
In 1990, he received his first Tamil Nadu State Film Award for Best Music Director. He received the Tamil Nadu Government's Kalaimamani Award in the year 1992. Deva received an award by Guinness World Records for Sivappu Mazhai as the world fastest movie from script to screening. He won the Filmfare Award for Best Music Director - Kannada film Amrutha Varshini.

== Filmography ==
=== Film ===
Year	Title	Role	Notes	Ref.
1994	Killadi Mappillai	Himself	Appeared in Title card Music Director Name	
1996	Summa Irunga Machan	Himself	Special appearance in the song "Chandhiranum"	
1998	Unnidathil Ennai Koduthen	Himself	Special appearances	
1999	Chinna Raja	Himself	Special appearances	
2004	Adi Thadi	Himself	Special appearances	
2005	Englishkaran	Himself	Special appearances	
2009	Modhi Vilayadu	Himself	Special appearance in the song "Modhi Vilayadu"	

=== Television ===
Year	Name of Television Show	Role	Network	Ref.
2024	Super Singer Season 10	Guest	Star Vijay	
