= T. Arunkumar =

Indian politician (born 1987)

Dr. T. Arunkumar

Member of the Tamil Nadu Legislative Assembly
- Incumbent
- Assumed office 2026
- Preceded by: V. G. Raajendran
- Constituency: Thiruvallur
- Majority: 24,760 (2026)

Personal details
- Born: 1987 (age 38–39)
- Party: Tamilaga Vettri Kazhagam
- Occupation: Politician, Doctor

T. Arunkumar (born 1987) is an Indian politician from Tamil Nadu. He is a member of the Tamil Nadu Legislative Assembly from Thiruvallur Assembly constituency in Thiruvallur district representing Tamilaga Vettri Kazhagam.

== Political career ==
Arunkumar became an MLA for the first time winning the 2026 Tamil Nadu Legislative Assembly election from Thiruvallur Assembly constituency representing Tamilaga Vettri Kazhagam. He polled 92,190 votes and defeated his nearest rival, V. G. Rajendran of the Dravida Munnetra Kazhagam, by a margin of 24,760 votes.
