= E. Thenral Kumar =

Indian politician

Member of the Tamil Nadu Legislative Assembly
- Incumbent
- Assumed office 4 May 2026
- Preceded by: M. Jaganmoorthy
- Constituency: K. V. Kuppam

Personal details
- Party: Tamilaga Vettri Kazhagam
- Occupation: Politician

E. Thendral Kumar is an Indian politician who is a Member of the 17th Legislative Assembly of Tamil Nadu. He was elected from K. V. Kuppam as an TVK candidate in 2026.

== Elections contested ==
2026 Tamil Nadu Legislative Assembly election: K. V. Kuppam
Party	Candidate	Votes	%	±%
TVK	E. Thenral Kumar	74,305	39.13	New
Puratchi Bharatham (AIADMK)	Jegan Moorthy. M	54,050	28.46	▼20.62
DMK	Dr. Rajeswari. R	53,898	28.38	▼14.56
NTK	Kalaiyenthiri. R	5,183	2.73	▼3.09
NOTA	NOTA	972	0.51	▼0.53
All India Puratchi Thalaivar Makkal Munnetra Kazhagam	Anandalai Thangaraj. M	482	0.25	New
Independent	Jayashankar. J	227	0.12	New
TVK	Raja. M	202	0.11	New
Independent	Jaya Bharath. J	157	0.08	New
Independent	Sathish. A	157	0.08	New
Independent	Murugan. K.P	146	0.08	New
Independent	Kumaresan. L	113	0.06	New
Margin of victory		20,255	10.67	▲4.53
Turnout		1,89,892	87.50	▲11.67
Registered electors		2,17,021		▼10,220
TVK gain from AIADMK		Swing	▲39.13	
