= S. M. Dorairaj =

Indian politician

Member of the Tamil Nadu Legislative Assembly
- In office 1967 - 1972; 1971 - 1976
- Preceded by: V. S. Arunachalam
- Constituency: Thiruvallur

Personal details
- Political party: Dravida Munnetra Kazhagam

S. M. Dorairaj was an Indian politician and former Member of the Legislative Assembly of Tamil Nadu. He was elected to the Tamil Nadu legislative assembly from Tiruvallur constituency as a Dravida Munnetra Kazhagam candidate in 1967, and 1971 elections and he was also first Treasurer of the ADMK party. He was elected from Ponneri constituency as an Anna Dravida Munnetra Kazhagam candidate in 1977 election.

== Electoral performance ==
1971 Tamil Nadu Legislative Assembly election: Thiruvallur
Party	Candidate	Votes	%	±%
DMK	S. M. Dorairaj	36,496	62.81%	−3.25
INC	V. S. Arunachalam	17,759	30.56%	−0.34
Independent	Gopal	3,855	6.63%	New
Margin of victory		18,737	32.24%	−2.92%
Turnout		58,110	71.32%	−2.34%
Registered electors		91,042		
DMK hold		Swing	-3.25%	

1967 Madras Legislative Assembly election: Thiruvallur
Party	Candidate	Votes	%	±%
DMK	S. M. Dorairaj	40,687	66.06%	+26.17
INC	V. S. Arunachalam	19,030	30.90%	−19.29
Independent	P. Gopal	1,875	3.04%	New
Margin of victory		21,657	35.16%	24.86%
Turnout		61,592	73.66%	12.90%
Registered electors		87,391		
DMK gain from INC		Swing	15.87%	

1962 Madras Legislative Assembly election: Thiruvallur
Party	Candidate	Votes	%	±%
INC	V. S. Arunachalam	21,609	50.19%	+16.47
DMK	S. M. Dorairaj	17,175	39.89%	New
SWA	M. Dharmalingam	4,269	9.92%	New
Margin of victory		4,434	10.30%	5.67%
Turnout		43,053	60.76%	−9.65%
Registered electors		74,349		
INC hold		Swing	16.47%	
