= Kilvaithinankuppam Assembly constituency =

State Legislative Assembly Constituency in Tamil Nadu

Coordinates: 12.96°N 78.99°E

Kilvaithinankuppam
- Constituency No. 45 for the Tamil Nadu Legislative Assembly

Constituency details
- Country: India
- Region: South India
- State: Tamil Nadu
- District: Vellore
- Lok Sabha constituency: Vellore
- Established: 2008
- Total electors: 2,17,021
- Reservation: SC

Member of Legislative Assembly
- 17th Tamil Nadu Legislative Assembly
- Incumbent E. Thendral Kumar
- Party: TVK
- Alliance: TVK+
- Elected year: 2026

K. V. Kuppam, or Kilvaithinankuppam, is a state assembly constituency in Tamil Nadu, India, formed after the constituency delimitation in 2008. Its State Assembly Constituency number is 45. The seat is reserved for candidates from the Scheduled Castes. It is included in Vellore Lok Sabha constituency for national elections. It is one of the 234 State Legislative Assembly Constituencies in Tamil Nadu.

== Members of the Legislative Assembly ==
Year	Member	Party
2011	S. K. Tamilarasan	All India Anna Dravida Munnetra Kazhagam
2016	G. Loganathan	All India Anna Dravida Munnetra Kazhagam
2021	M. Jagan Moorthy	All India Anna Dravida Munnetra Kazhagam
2026	E. Thendral Kumar	Tamilaga Vettri Kazhagam

== Election results ==
Vote share of winning candidates
2026	39.13%
2021	49.08%
2016	45.76%
2011	51.12%

=== 2026 ===
2026 Tamil Nadu Legislative Assembly election: K. V. Kuppam
Party	Candidate	Votes	%	±%
TVK	E. Thenral Kumar	74,305	39.13	New
Puratchi Bharatham (AIADMK)	Jegan Moorthy. M	54,050	28.46	▼20.62
DMK	Dr. Rajeswari. R	53,898	28.38	▼14.56
NTK	Kalaiyenthiri. R	5,183	2.73	▼3.09
NOTA	NOTA	972	0.51	▼0.53
All India Puratchi Thalaivar Makkal Munnetra Kazhagam	Anandalai Thangaraj. M	482	0.25	New
Independent	Jayashankar. J	227	0.12	New
TVK	Raja. M	202	0.11	New
Independent	Jaya Bharath. J	157	0.08	New
Independent	Sathish. A	157	0.08	New
Independent	Murugan. K.P	146	0.08	New
Independent	Kumaresan. L	113	0.06	New
Margin of victory		20,255	10.67	▲4.53
Turnout		1,89,892	87.50	▲11.67
Registered electors		2,17,021		▼10,220
TVK gain from AIADMK		Swing	▲39.13	

=== 2021 ===
2021 Tamil Nadu Legislative Assembly election: Kilvaithinankuppam
Party	Candidate	Votes	%	±%
AIADMK	M. Jagan Moorthy	84,579	49.08	3.32
DMK	K. Seetharaman	73,997	42.94	3.08
NTK	J. Divya Rani	10,027	5.82	5.34
NOTA	Nota	1,798	1.04	−0.16
DMDK	P. Dhanaseelan	1,432	0.83	−1.69
RPPRINAT	K. Elavarasan	547	0.32	
IJK	K. Venkatasamy	519	0.30	
BSP	D. Pushpalatha	519	0.30	0.02
Independent	S. Selva Chenguttuvan	331	0.19	
Independent	E. P. Elanchezhiyan	242	0.14	
NDPOSI	K. Sathu	133	0.08	
Margin of victory		10,582	6.14	0.24
Turnout		172,326	75.83	−4.56
Rejected ballots		553	0.32	
Registered electors		227,241		
AIADMK hold		Swing	3.32	

=== 2016 ===
2016 Tamil Nadu Legislative Assembly election: Kilvaithinankuppam
Party	Candidate	Votes	%	±%
AIADMK	G. Loganathan	75,612	45.76	−5.36
DMK	V. Amulu	65,866	39.86	−4.33
PMK	C. Kusalakumari	13,046	7.90	
DMDK	M. Deviyammal	4,170	2.52	
BJP	R. Vimala	2,210	1.34	
NOTA	None Of The Above	1,990	1.20	
NTK	N. Archana	788	0.48	
BSP	K. Mohan	457	0.28	−0.59
Independent	J. Raja	283	0.17	
Independent	S. Annammal	238	0.14	
LJP	A. Selva Kumar	229	0.14	
Margin of victory		9,746	5.90	−1.03
Turnout		165,226	80.39	0.36
Registered electors		205,533		
AIADMK hold		Swing	-5.36	

=== 2011 ===
2011 Tamil Nadu Legislative Assembly election: Kilvaithinankuppam
Party	Candidate	Votes	%	±%
AIADMK	C. K. Thamizharasan	72,002	51.12	
DMK	K. Seetharaman	62,242	44.19	
Independent	S. Anumanthan	1,350	0.96	
BSP	B. Saravanan	1,226	0.87	
IJK	N. Ilayakumar	1,111	0.79	
Independent	M. Ravi	1,061	0.75	
Independent	S. Ramesh	592	0.42	
Independent	Tamilarasan	454	0.32	
Independent	S. Sudhakar	370	0.26	
LJP	C. Chandran	257	0.18	
Independent	M. Sankar	183	0.13	
Margin of victory		9,760	6.93	
Turnout		175,992	80.03	
Registered electors		140,848		
AIADMK win (new seat)				
