= G. Hari =

Indian politician

Member of Tamil Nadu Legislative Assembly
- Incumbent
- Assumed office 11 May 2026
- Preceded by: S. Chandran
- Constituency: Tiruttani
- In office 11 May 2006 – 13 May 2011
- Preceded by: G. Raviraj
- Succeeded by: M. Arun Subramanian
- Constituency: Tiruttani

Member of Parliament, Lok Sabha
- In office 1 September 2014 – 23 May 2019
- Preceded by: S. Jagathrakshakan
- Succeeded by: S. Jagathrakshakan
- Constituency: Arakkonam

Personal details
- Born: 25 July 1960 (age 66) Kuppamkandigai, Tiruvallur, Tamil Nadu
- Party: All India Anna Dravida Munnetra Kazhagam
- Spouse: Smt. Usharani
- Children: 3
- Education: Madras University, Annamalai University, Madras Law College
- Occupation: Advocate
- As of 17 December, 2016

G. Hari (b 1960) is an Indian politician and Member of Parliament elected from Tamil Nadu. He is elected to the Lok Sabha from Arakkonam constituency as an Anna Dravida Munnetra Kazhagam candidate in 2014 election.

He is a practicing advocate at a Tiruthani court and as of 2014 he is the district secretary of the MGR Manram (Tiruthani North). He is a native of Kuppankadiagai village in Thiruvalangadu block near Tiruthani. He represented the party in Tamil Nadu Assembly as the Tiruthani MLA during 2006–2011.

== Electoral performance ==
2026 Tamil Nadu Legislative Assembly election : Tiruttani
Party	Candidate	Votes	%	±%
AIADMK	G. Hari	89,169	37.34	▼2.09
TVK	M. Sathya Kumar	83,376	34.91	New
DMDK	D. Krishnamurthy	54,863	22.97	▲21.27
NOTA	None of the above	1,210	0.51	▼0.21
Margin of victory		5,793	2.43	▼10.24
Turnout		239,451	91.22	▲11.17
Total valid votes		238,798		
Registered electors		262,500		▼9.90
AIADMK gain from DMK		Swing	▼14.75	

2021 Tamil Nadu Legislative Assembly election : Tiruttani
Party	Candidate	Votes	%	±%
DMK	S. Chandran	120,314	52.09	New
AIADMK	G. Hari	91,061	39.43	▼2.41
DMDK	D. Krishnamoorthi	3,928	1.70	▼5.34
NOTA	None of the above	1,665	0.72	▼0.21
Margin of victory		29,253	12.67	▲2.27
Turnout		233,222	80.05	▼0.89
Total valid votes		230,959		
Rejected ballots		598	0.26	▲0.25
Registered electors		291,336		▲6.01
DMK gain from AIADMK		Swing	▲10.25	

2006 Tamil Nadu Legislative Assembly election : Tiruttani
Party	Candidate	Votes	%	±%
AIADMK	G. Hari	52,871	43.09	New
PMK	G. Eraviraj	51,955	42.35	▼7.66
DMDK	R. Sekar	11,293	9.20	New
Independent	D. Rajapandiyan	1,965	1.60	New
BJP	P. Siranjeevulu	1,051	0.86	New
Independent	G. Raghu	874	0.71	New
Margin of victory		916	0.75	▼11.10
Turnout		122,823	74.53	▲7.24
Total valid votes		122,687		
Registered electors		164,790		▼5.28
AIADMK gain from PMK		Swing	▼6.92	

1996 Tamil Nadu Legislative Assembly election : Tiruttani
Party	Candidate	Votes	%	±%
DMK	E. A. P. Sivaji	58,049	53.90	New
AIADMK	G. Hari	28,507	26.47	New
PMK	G. Eraviraj	12,896	11.98	▼1.64
MDMK	Narasimhan	5,638	5.24	New
BJP	M. Krishnamoorthy	815	0.76	▼0.21
Margin of victory		29,542	27.43	▲3.83
Turnout		113,258	69.69	▲4.47
Total valid votes		107,691		
Registered electors		162,521		▲5.87
DMK gain from AIADMK		Swing	▲0.70	
