= C. Subramani =

Indian politician

C. Subramani, also known as C. S. Mani, is an Indian politician and was a Member of the Legislative Assembly. He was elected to the Tamil Nadu legislative assembly as a Dravida Munnetra Kazhagam (DMK) candidate from Tiruvallur constituency in the 1996 election.

In October 2003, four properties connected to Subramani were searched by the Directorate of Vigilance and Anti-Corruption probing allegations that he possessed assets disproportionate to his known income. This formed part of a wider investigation into similar allegations raised by the Government of Tamil Nadu which was by then controlled by Jayalalithaa's All India Anna Dravida Munnetra Kazhagam party. He, his wife and two sons were formally charged in 2005. All charges were dismissed by the courts in 2015 due to lack of evidence.
