= S. Pattabiraman =

Indian politician

S. Pattabiraman was an Indian politician and former Member of the Legislative Assembly of Tamil Nadu. He was elected to the Tamil Nadu legislative assembly from Tiruvallur constituency as an Anna Dravida Munnetra Kazhagam candidate in 1977, 1980, and 1984 elections.
