= Sakkaramallur =

Sakkaramallur (Arcot)
- Modern village panchayat
- Country: India
- State: Tamil Nadu
- District: Ranipet District

Population (2011)
  - Total: 5,000

Languages
  - Official: Tamil
- Time zone: UTC+5:30 (IST)
- PIN: 632504
- Telephone code: 04172
- Vehicle registration: TN23, TN 73 Ranipet division
- Nearest city: Vellore, Kanchipuram, Chennai
- Sex ratio: 100 ♂/♀
- Literacy: 69.77%%
- Lok Sabha constituency: Arakkonam

Sakkaramallur is an Indian village panchayat located in Arcot Taluk of Ranipet District in the state of Tamil Nadu. Sakkaramallur is located on Right Bank of Palar River.

== Climate ==
The taluk has fairly healthy climate. The study area has distinctly high temperature in hot months and cold weather is for a short duration.

The climatic seasons are generally classified as follows:

- Cold season from November to January with a mean maximum and minimum temperature of 29 C and 18.4 C respectively.
- Warm season from February to March and from July to October with a mean maximum and minimum temperature of 45 C and 30 C respectively.
- Hot season from April to June with a mean maximum and minimum temperature of 35 C and 27 C respectively.

The main maximum temperature during summer normal occurs in the month of May while the minimum temperature in winter occurs in January.

The north–east monsoon gives most of the rains. The average rainfall for a year is found to be 600 mm. The maximum rainfall occurs during the month of September and October due to north-east monsoon.

== Demographics ==
Religious census
Religion	Percent(%)
Hindu	100%
Muslim	0%
Christian	0.1%
Sikh	0.0%
Buddhist	0.0%
Jain	0.0%
Other	0.0%
No religion	0.0%

== Politics ==
Eswarappan is the sitting MLA from Dravida Munnetra Kazhagam and G. Hari is sitting Member of Parliament, from Anna Dravida Munnetra Kazhagam (ADMK).

Sakkaramllur is part of Arcot Assembly Constituency. Arcot assembly constituency is part of Arakkonam (Lok Sabha constituency). R. Srinivasan is the sitting Chairperson of the Municipality from ADMK.

== Transport ==
The main mode of transport is by bus since it is economical, and well connected by road. A national highway and two state highways pass through Nearby Arcot Town. There are frequent buses to almost all parts of Tamil Nadu. Buses depart every 15 minutes from Arcot Town to Chennai City and there are also buses to Hosur, Bangalore, Tirupathi, Pondicherry (Puducherry). There are lot of private bus operators as well, who provide services on local and short-distance routes. The nearest railway station to sakkaramallur is Walaja Road, which is around 10 km from Sakkaramallur. There are buses (Route 202) Between Arani and Chennai very frequently and also straight buses (Route 123) between Arcot to Chennai. The local bus from Karivedu to Arcot Town is route no.36,37,38.Buses depart every 15–20 minutes from Arcot Town to sakkaramallur Village. Connectivity available on Arcot town Bus-stop In All Areas.

The nearest railway station is walajah Road station 10 km from the town lying between Arakkonam and Vellore-Katpadi Junction 40 km. The new broad gauge line from Tindivanam to Nagari via Walajah Road Junction will pass through nearby Arcot Town. It will function within one year.

== Background ==
Neighbouring villages are Puthupadi, Anathangal, Essaiyanur, Valavanur. The village is home to a population of around 5000 in around 1500 households. The main occupations represented in the village is farming. The village has a pond and a lake; after the rainy season, villagers use the lake water and palar river for irrigation. One corporate bank is available in the village, the bank offers loan facilities for farming families. One Govt post office is available in the village One famous Government higher secondary school is also located in the village. There is a Cricket ground is situated to the local School. Villagers hold Summer cricket tournaments against neighbouring village teams.

The route from Arcot to Kancheepuram en route these villages. Arcot→Mupathuvetti→Puthupadi→Sakkaramallur→Anathangal→Essaiyanur→Valavanur→Brahmadesam→Kancheepuram.

Some of the nearest towns are:

- Arcot (15 km)
- Cheyyar (25 km)
- Walajapet (10 km)

Some of the district headquarters are:

- Vellore (33 km)
- Kanceepuram (40 km)

== Educational facilities ==
Some of the colleges for students:

- Adhiparasakthi Engineering & Agricultural college, GB Nagar.
- SSS college of arts and science, Arcot.
- C.Abdul Hakeem Engineering college, Melvisharam.
- VIT University, Katpadi.
- Arinjar Anna Arivial college, Cheyyar.
- Thiruvalluvar University, Vellore.
- Periyar Engineering College, Vellore.
- M.M.E.S Women's Arts and Science College, Melvisharam.
- Global Institute of Engineering & Technology, Visharam.
- Sitheeswarar Polytechnic College, Arcot.
- Mahalakshmi women's college, Vilapakkam.
- AAA Women's college, Walajapet.

Some of the schools:

- Government Higher Secondary School, Sakkaramallur.
- Government Girls Higher Secondary School, Arcot.
- Sri Ramakrishna Matriculation Higher Secondary School, Arcot.
- GVC Higher Secondary School, Arcot.
- Balsam Academy, Ranipet.
