= E. S. Thyagarajan =

Indian politician

Ekiri Sanjeevi Mudaliar Thyagarajan Mudaliar is an Indian politician and former Member of the Legislative Assembly of Tamil Nadu. He was elected to the Tamil Nadu legislative assembly from Tiruttani constituency as a Tamil Arasu Kazhagam candidate in 1971 election.

Born in Sengunthar Kaikola Mudaliyar (Echaan Gothram), he is the son of philanthropist Ekiri Sanjeevi Mudaliar. His nephew is Dr. E.S.S. Raman, who was also a former Member of the Legislative Assembly.
