= V. S. Arunachalam =

Indian politician and former Member of the Legislative Assembly of Tamil Nadu

Member of the Madras State Assembly
- In office 1957 - 1962; 1962 - 1967
- Constituency: Thiruvallur

Personal details
- Political party: Indian National Congress

V. S. Arunachalam was an Indian politician and former Member of the Legislative Assembly of Tamil Nadu. He was elected to the Tamil Nadu legislative assembly from Tiruvallur constituency as an Indian National Congress candidate in 1957, and 1962 elections.
