= P. M. Narasimhan =

Indian politician

Member of the Tamil Nadu Legislative Assembly
- In office May 2016 – May 2021
- Preceded by: A. G. Chidambaram
- Succeeded by: M. Arun Subramanian
- Constituency: Tiruttani
- In office 2001 - 2006
- Constituency: Pallipet
- In office 1980 - 1989
- Constituency: Pallipet

Personal details
- Party: All India Anna Dravida Munnetra Kazhagam

P. M. Narasimhan is a politician from Tamil Nadu, India. Former Acting Speaker of Tamil Nadu Legislative Assembly, He was elected from the Tiruttani constituency to the Fifteenth Tamil Nadu Legislative Assembly as a member of the All India Anna Dravida Munnetra Kazhagam political party in the 2016 Tamil Nadu legislative assembly elections.

== Elections contested ==
| Election | Constituency | Party | Result | Vote % | Runner-up | Runner-up Party | Runner-up vote % | Ref. |
|---|---|---|---|---|---|---|---|---|
| 2016 Tamil Nadu Legislative Assembly election | Tiruttani | AIADMK | Won | 41.84% | A. G. Chidambaram | INC | 31.43% | |
| 2006 Tamil Nadu Legislative Assembly election | Pallipet | AIADMK | Lost | 40.43% | E. S. S. Raman | INC | 46.21% | |
| 2001 Tamil Nadu Legislative Assembly election | Pallipet | AIADMK | Won | 49.42% | M. Chakravarthy | BJP | 27.02% | |
| 1984 Tamil Nadu Legislative Assembly election | Pallipet | AIADMK | Won | 39.96% | A. Bakambaram | IND | 32.85% | |
| 1980 Tamil Nadu Legislative Assembly election | Pallipet | AIADMK} | Won | 35.03% | A. Eakambara Reddy | INC | 34.48% | |
