= G. Loganathan =

Indian politician

G. Loganathan is an Indian politician. He serves as the Vellore ADMK party general secretary and Member of the Legislative Assembly (MLA). In 2016, he was selected as MLA candidate (KV Kuppam constituency) by CM Jayalalithaa. He won that election by 9,746 votes, defeating the DMK MLA candidate V. Amalu. He served in the Indian Army.
