= V. G. Raajendran =

Indian politician

Member of the Tamil Nadu Legislative Assembly
- In office 16 May 2016 – 6 May 2026
- Constituency: Thiruvallur

Personal details
- Born: 11 June 1967 (age 58) Chennai
- Party: Dravida Munnetra Kazhagam
- Spouse: R. Indira
- Children: R. Vasisht Adavaith (son) R. Priyadarshni (daughter)
- Occupation: Managing Director, Indira Foundation (P) Ltd. Chairman, Indira Medical College and Hospital

V. G. Raajendran is an Indian politician who is a Member of Legislative Assembly of Tamil Nadu. He was elected from Thiruvallur as a Dravida Munnetra Kazhagam candidate in 2021.

== Electoral performance ==
Election	Party	Constituency Name	Result	Votes gained	Vote share%
2021	Dravida Munnetra Kazhagam	Thiruvallur	Won	107,709	50.27%
2016	Dravida Munnetra Kazhagam	Thiruvallur	Won	80,473	39.02%
