= Puratchi Bharatham Katchi =

Indian political party

- Abbreviation: PBK
- President: M. Jagan Moorthy
- Treasurer: M. Maran
- Founder: Poovai M. Moorthy
- Founded: 26 January 1978; 48 years ago
- Headquarters: 13, First Floor, Perum Salai, P.R.C. Complex, Poonamallee, Chennai – 600056, Tamil Nadu, India.
- Ideology: Scheduled Castes interests
- Political position: Syncretic
- Colours: Blue
- ECI status: Unrecognised Party
- Alliance: AIADMK front (2019-2026), DPA (2006-2011)
- Seats in Rajya Sabha: 0 / 245
- Seats in Lok Sabha: 0 / 543
- Seats in Tamil Nadu Legislative Assembly: 1 / 234
- Number of states and union territories in government: 0 / 31

Party flag
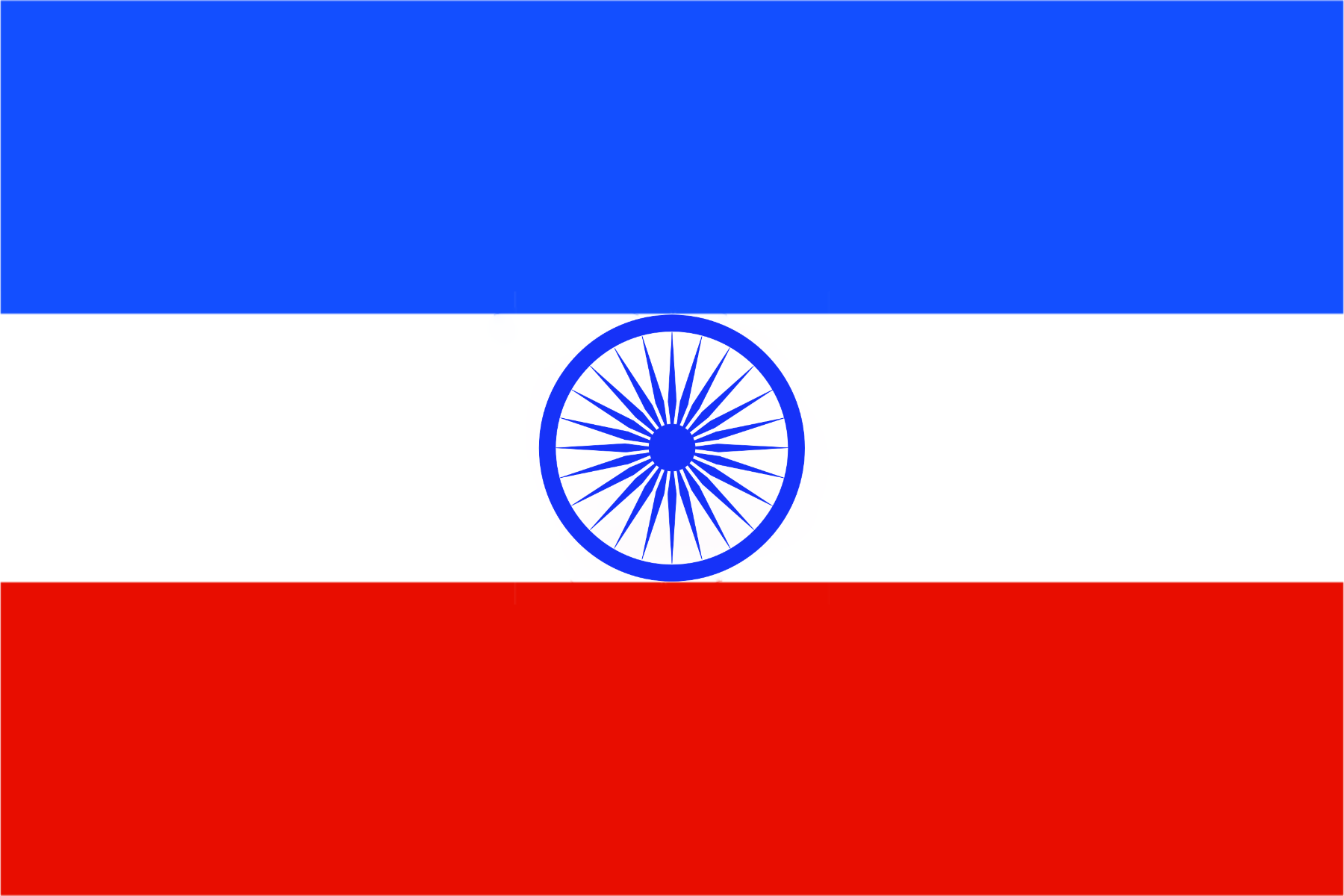

Website
- www.thepbk.in

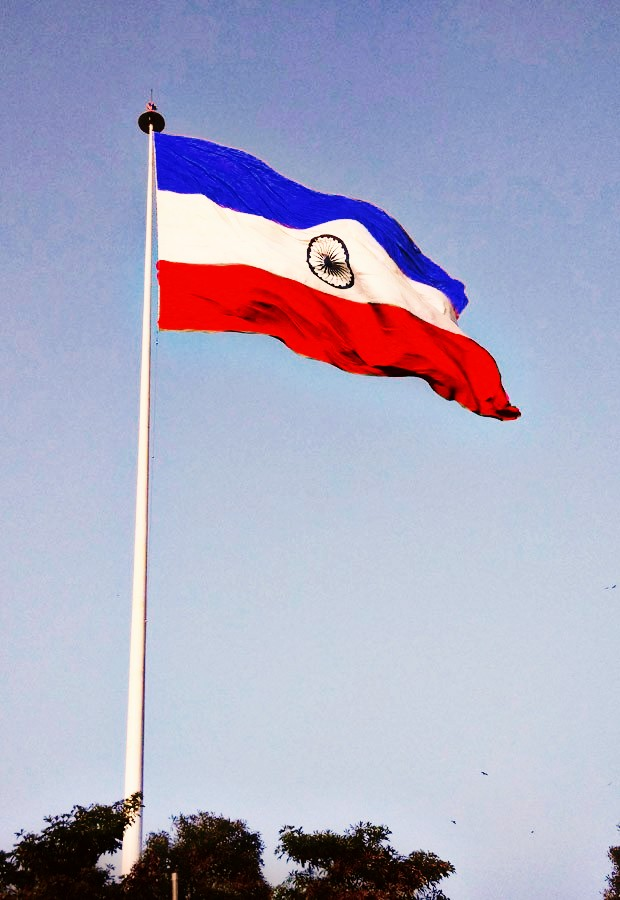
Party flag

The Puratchi Bharatham Katchi (transl. Revolutionary India party; abbreviated as PBK) is an Indian social movement and political party active in the state of Tamil Nadu that seeks to combat caste-based discrimination. It is founded by M. Murthy. The party operates in the states of Tamil Nadu, Puducherry and Andhra Pradesh. M. Jagan Moorthy is the current president of the party. This party was established for education, employment and economic development of the Scheduled Caste people.

== History ==
It was initially started as the Ambedkar Mandram in 1978 by Moorthy and later reformed into Ambedkar People Liberation Front (APLF). In 1998, It became a full-fledged political party on its current form of 'Puratchi Bhartham Katchi'. After Poovai Moorthy's death in 2002, his brother M. Jagan Moorthy became the party leader. The party leader M. Jagan Moorthy contested in DMK-led Democratic Progressive Alliance and won the Arakkonam Assembly constituency in 2006 Tamil Nadu Legislative Assembly election on the DMK symbol. The party extended its support to the AIADMK in the 2016. In the 2021 Tamil Nadu Election, M. Jagan Moorthy contested on behalf of the AIADMK-led Alliance in the Kilvaithinankuppam Assembly constituency on the AIADMK symbol and won 83,989 (48.57%) votes, defeating the Dravida Munnetra Kazhagam candidate.

== Controversy ==
There was a case in the court against the usage of Ashoka Chakra in the middle of the party flag.

== List of party leaders ==
=== Presidents ===
No.	Portrait	Name (Birth–Death)	Term in office		
No.	Portrait	Name (Birth–Death)	Assumed office	Left office	Time in office
1		Poovai M. Moorthy (1953–2002)	26 January 1978	2 September 2002	24 years, 219 days
2		M. Jagan Moorthy (1966–)	7 September 2002	Incumbent	23 years, 327 days
