= J. Jayalalithaa =

Indian actress and politician (1948–2016)

Amma Jayalalithaa
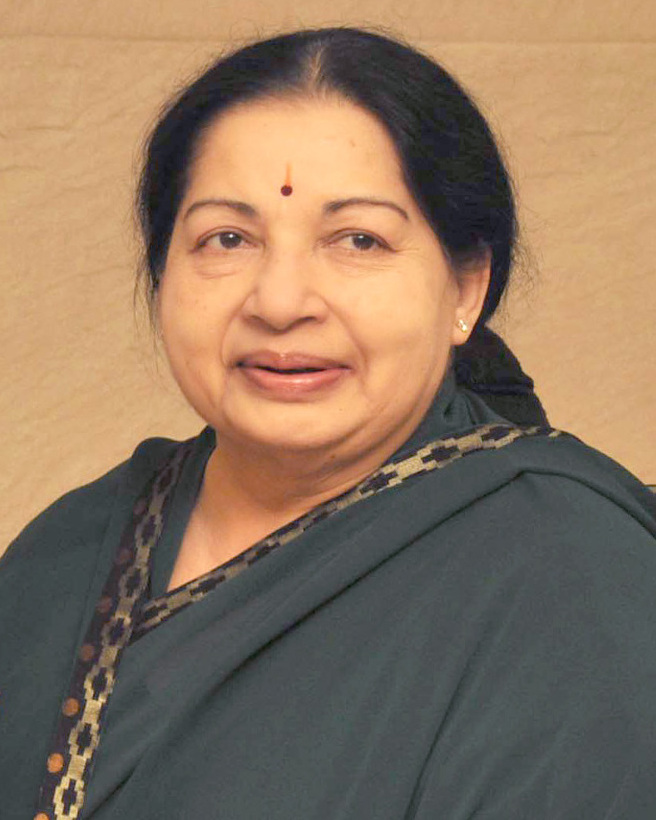
- Jayalalithaa in 2015

5th Chief Minister of Tamil Nadu
- In office 23 May 2015 (Note: She was sworn in on 23 May 2015 after her acquittal in the disproportionate assets case. Following the AIADMK's victory in the 2016 Assembly election, she was sworn in again on 23 May 2016, thereby continuing in office without interruption.) – 5 December 2016
- Governor: Konijeti Rosaiah; C. Vidyasagar Rao
- Cabinet: Jayalalithaa V; Jayalalithaa VI
- Preceded by: O. Panneerselvam
- Succeeded by: O. Panneerselvam
- Constituency: Dr. Radhakrishnan Nagar
- In office 16 May 2011 – 27 September 2014
- Governor: Surjit Singh Barnala; Konijeti Rosaiah
- Cabinet: Jayalalithaa IV
- Preceded by: M. Karunanidhi
- Succeeded by: O. Panneerselvam
- Constituency: Srirangam
- In office 2 March 2002 – 12 May 2006
- Governor: P. S. Ramamohan Rao; Surjit Singh Barnala
- Cabinet: Jayalalithaa III
- Preceded by: O. Panneerselvam
- Succeeded by: M. Karunanidhi
- Constituency: Andipatti
- In office 14 May 2001 – 21 September 2001
- Governor: Fathima Beevi; C. Rangarajan
- Cabinet: Jayalalithaa II
- Preceded by: M. Karunanidhi
- Succeeded by: O. Panneerselvam
- Constituency: Did not contest
- In office 24 June 1991 – 12 May 1996
- Governor: Bhishma Narain Singh; Marri Chenna Reddy
- Cabinet: Jayalalithaa I
- Preceded by: President's rule
- Succeeded by: M. Karunanidhi
- Constituency: Bargur

9th Leader of the Opposition in the Tamil Nadu Legislative Assembly
- In office 29 May 2006 – 14 May 2011
- Deputy: O. Panneerselvam
- Chief Minister: M. Karunanidhi
- Preceded by: O. Panneerselvam
- Succeeded by: Vijayakant
- Constituency: Andipatti
- In office 9 February 1989 – 1 December 1989
- Deputy: Su. Thirunavukkarasar
- Chief Minister: M. Karunanidhi
- Preceded by: O. Subramanian
- Succeeded by: S. R. Eradha
- Constituency: Bodinayakkanur

Member of Parliament, Rajya Sabha
- In office 3 April 1984 – 28 January 1989
- Prime Minister: Indira Gandhi; Rajiv Gandhi
- Preceded by: Sathiavani Muthu
- Succeeded by: Pasumpon Tha. Kiruttinan
- Constituency: Tamil Nadu

Member of the Tamil Nadu Legislative Assembly
- In office 4 July 2015 – 5 December 2016
- Chief Minister: Herself
- Preceded by: P. Vetrivel
- Succeeded by: T. T. V. Dhinakaran
- Constituency: Dr. Radhakrishnan Nagar
- In office 23 May 2011 – 27 September 2014
- Chief Minister: Herself
- Preceded by: M. Paranjothi
- Succeeded by: S. Valarmathi
- Constituency: Srirangam
- In office 24 February 2002 – 14 May 2011
- Chief Minister: Herself; M. Karunanidhi
- Preceded by: Thanga Tamil Selvan
- Succeeded by: Thanga Tamil Selvan
- Constituency: Andipatti
- In office 1 July 1991 – 12 May 1996
- Chief Minister: Herself
- Preceded by: K. R. Rajendran
- Succeeded by: E. G. Sugavanam
- Constituency: Bargur
- In office 1 July 1991 – 23 July 1991
- Chief Minister: Herself
- Preceded by: P. Marapan
- Succeeded by: R. M. Veerappan
- Constituency: Kangayam
- In office 6 February 1989 – 30 January 1991
- Chief Minister: M. Karunanidhi
- Preceded by: K. S. M. Ramachandran
- Succeeded by: V. Panneerselvam
- Constituency: Bodinayakkanur

General Secretary of the All India Anna Dravida Munnetra Kazhagam
- In office 1 January 1988 (Note: From 17 December 1988 to 9 February 1989, Election Commission of India froze AIADMK's name, so Jayalalithaa served general secretary of AIADMK(J) Faction that time.) – 5 December 2016
- Preceded by: M. G. Ramachandran
- Succeeded by: V. K. Sasikala (acting); Edappadi K. Palaniswami

Propaganda Secretary of the All India Anna Dravida Munnetra Kazhagam
- In office 5 September 1985 – 31 December 1987
- General Secretary: S. Raghavanandam; M. G. Ramachandran
- Succeeded by: Sattur Ramachandran
- In office 28 January 1983 – 20 August 1984
- General Secretary: P. U. Shanmugam
- Preceded by: R. Manimaran

Personal details
- Born: Jayaram Jayalalitha; 24 February 1948 Melukote, Mysore State, Dominion of India
- Died: 5 December 2016 (aged 68) Chennai, Tamil Nadu, India
- Cause of death: Cardiac arrest
- Resting place: M.G.R. and Amma Memorial
- Party: All India Anna Dravida Munnetra Kazhagam
- Parent: Sandhya (mother)
- Relatives: Vidyavathi (maternal aunt); J. Deepa (niece)
- Education: Bishop Cotton Girls' School; Church Park Presentation Convent; Stella Maris College, Chennai
- Profession: Film actress; classical dancer; singer; writer; politician; philanthropist
- Awards: Kalaimamani (1972)
- Nickname(s): Amma (Mother); Puratchi Thalaivi (Revolutionary Leader); Kalai Selvi (Daughter of Arts); Ammu (Young Lady)
- Makkalaal Naan Makkalukaagavae Naan (I am by the people for the people)

Jayalalithaa Jayaram (Note: In 2001 Jayalalitha appended an additional letter "a" to her name for numerological reasons.) (24 February 1948 – 5 December 2016), popularly known as Amma, was an Indian politician and actress who served as the Chief Minister of Tamil Nadu for six terms spanning more than fourteen years between 1991 and 2016. She was the longest-serving General Secretary of the All India Anna Dravida Munnetra Kazhagam (AIADMK) and regarded as one of the most influential politicians of post-independence India.

Before entering politics, Jayalalithaa rose to prominence as a leading film actress in the mid-1960s, earning recognition for her versatility and classical dance skills. In 1982, she joined the AIADMK, founded by her frequent co-star M. G. Ramachandran (MGR), who was the Chief Minister. She rose swiftly within the party to become its Propaganda Secretary and was elected to the Rajya Sabha. After MGR's death in 1987, she outmanoeuvred the rival faction led by his widow V. N. Janaki to emerge as the party's sole leader.

Jayalalithaa first became Chief Minister in 1991, making her Tamil Nadu's youngest at the time. Her tenures were marked by strong centralisation of power, an extensive social-welfare agenda—most visibly the Amma-branded subsidised canteens, bottled water, salt, and cement—and an at-times ruthless posture towards political opponents. Her career was punctuated by serious legal difficulties: the DMK government led by M. Karunanidhi, her bête noire, filed 28 corruption cases against her after the 1996 election, and she was convicted in a disproportionate assets case in 2014. Each time, she was eventually acquitted and returned to office. In the 2016 assembly election, she became the first Tamil Nadu chief minister since MGR in 1984 to be voted back into power.

In September 2016, Jayalalithaa fell severely ill and was hospitalized for 75 days before dying from cardiac arrest on 5 December 2016 and became the first female chief minister in India to die in office. She never married and had no children. Critics accused her of fostering a personality cult and demanding absolute loyalty from party legislators and ministers.

== Early life, education and family ==
Jayalalithaa was born on 24 February 1948 to Jayaram and Vedavalli (Sandhya) in a Hindu Tamil Iyengar Brahmin family at Melukote, Pandavapura taluk, Mandya district, then in Mysore State (now Karnataka). She had a brother, Jayakumar.

Her paternal grandfather, Narasimhan Rengachary, was in the service of the Mysore kingdom as a surgeon and served as the court physician to Maharaja Krishna Raja Wadiyar IV of Mysore. Her maternal grandfather, Rangasamy Iyengar, moved to Mysore from Srirangam to work with Hindustan Aeronautics Limited. He had one son and three daughters—Ambujavalli, Vedavalli, and Padmavalli. Vedavalli was married to Jayaram, son of Narasimhan Rengachary. The couple Jayaram and Vedvalli had two children: a son, Jayakumar, and a daughter, Jayalalitha. Her mother, her relatives, and later co-stars and friends referred to her as Ammu, based on what she called her mother (Amma) at first.

She is of the same lineage as popular figures like K. T. Bhashyam (former minister of Mysore State and Chairman of Mysore Legislative Council) and famous lawyer L. S. Raju, who made significant contributions to the history of Mysore State (now Karnataka).

Jayalalithaa's father, Jayaram, was a lawyer but never worked and squandered most of the family's wealth. He died when Jayalalithaa was two years old. The widowed Vedavalli returned to her father's home in Bangalore in 1950. Vedavalli learned shorthand and typewriting to take up a clerical position to help support the family in 1950. Her younger sister Ambujavalli had moved to Madras, working as an air hostess. She also started acting in dramas and films using the screen name Vidyavathy. On the insistence of Ambujavalli, Jayalalithaa's mother, Vedavalli, also relocated to Madras and stayed with her sister from 1952. Vedavalli worked in a commercial firm in Madras and began dabbling in acting from 1953 under the screen name Sandhya. Jayalalithaa remained under the care of her mother's sister Padmavalli and maternal grandparents from 1950 to 1958 in Mysore. While still in Bangalore, Jayalalithaa attended Bishop Cotton Girls' School, Bangalore.

After her aunt Padmavalli's marriage in 1958, Jayalalithaa moved to Madras to live with her mother. She completed her education at Sacred Heart Matriculation School (popularly known as Church Park Presentation Convent or Presentation Church Park Convent). Sisters Catherine simon and Clare was one of her favourite teachers in church park convent. She excelled at school and was offered a government scholarship to pursue further education. She won the Gold State Award for coming first in 10th standard in the state of Tamil Nadu. She then joined the Stella Maris College, Chennai; however, she discontinued her studies due to pressure from her mother and became a film actress.

The Poes Garden plot was bought by Jayalalithaa and her mother on 1 July 1967 at a cost of ₹ 1.32 lakh, measuring around 24,000 sq. feet (10 grounds) with a built-up area of 21,662 sq. feet. Jayalalithaa's mother, Vedavalli, died in November 1971 at the age of 47. Jayalalithaa held the housewarming ceremony of her residence, Veda Nilayam (named after her beloved mother, Vedavalli, alias Sandhya), on 15 May 1972, early in the morning, followed by dinner and a Veena recital by classical musician Chitti babu in the evening. Her brother's wedding took place at her Veda Nilayam home in Poes Garden in 1972. Her brother Jayakumar, his wife Vijayalakshmi, and their daughter, Deepa Jayakumar, lived in Poes Garden with Jayalalithaa till 1978 and then moved to T.Nagar, Madras, to the bungalow 'Sandhya Illam,' which was bought by the mother of Jayalalithaa. Her brother was unhappy with the adoption of Sudhakaran, a relative of Sasikala, as the foster son of Jayalalithaa. Jayalalithaa had adopted Sasikala's nephew Sudhakaran in 1995 and disowned him in 1996. Her brother died in 1995 of a heart attack.

Jayalalithaa was fluent in several languages, including Tamil, Telugu, Kannada, Hindi, Malayalam, and English. She often conversed with Karnataka Chief ministers in Kannada. Basavaraj Bommai, the former irrigation minister and later chief minister of Karnataka, said, "I was astonished by her Kannada slang and fluency." She was fond of dogs as her pets. But after the death of Julie, a spitz, in 1998, she could not bear the loss and discontinued keeping pet dogs at her home.

== Film career ==
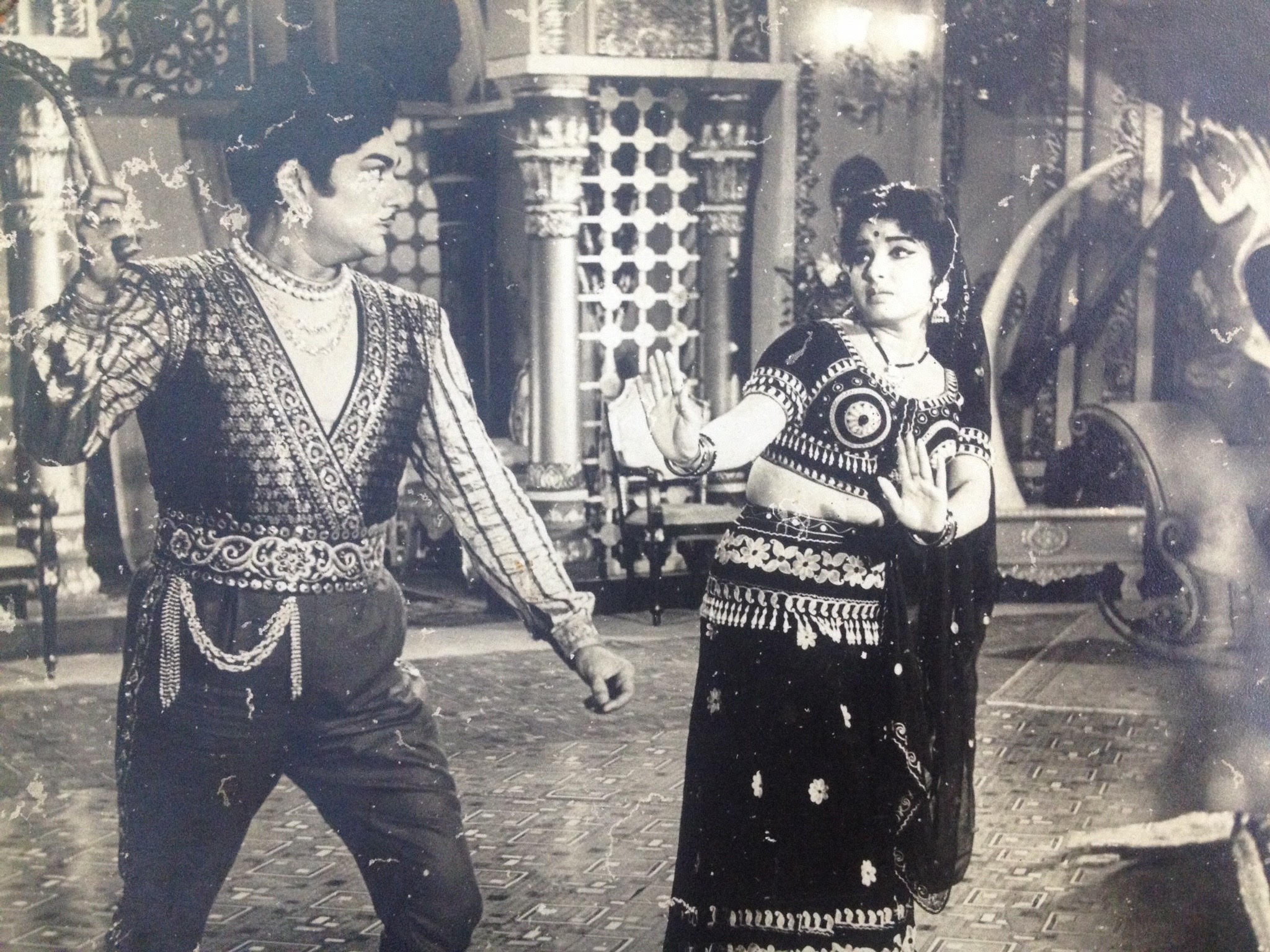
Jayalalithaa in the movie Gandikota Rahasyam (1969).

=== Early career ===
In Madras (now Chennai), Jayalalithaa was trained in Carnatic music, western classical piano and various forms of classical dance, including Bharatanatyam, Kuchipudi, Mohiniyattam, Manipuri, Kathak. She learnt Bharatnatyam and dance forms under K. J. Sarasa and also from K. N. Dandayudhapani Pillai. She had also learnt Kuchipudi under Padma Bhushan Guru Dr. Vempati Chinna Satyam. She became an accomplished dancer and gave her debut dance performance at the Rasika Ranjani Sabha in Mylapore in May 1960. The Chief Guest at the Arangetram was Shivaji Ganesan, who called her a "thanga silai" (golden statue) and expressed wish that Jayalalithaa becomes a film star in future.

As a child, Jayalalithaa acted in the Kannada-language film Sri Shaila Mahathme (1961), which starred Rajkumar and Krishna Kumari. She was taken to the studio by her mother as she was shooting in the same premises for a different film. While Jayalalithaa was watching the shooting, a problem arose as the child actress playing the Goddess Parvathy in a school drama scene in the film failed to show up and the producer Neerlahalli Thalikerappa and director Aroor Pattabhi asked Sandhya if Jayalalithaa could act in the dance sequence. Sandhya agreed and Jayalalithaa was swiftly dressed up as Parvathy and the scene was shot in Sri Shaila Mahatme.

She played Krishna in a three-minute dance sequence held on stage in the Hindi film Man-Mauji (1962) and danced with Kumari Naaz who played Radha. Y. G. Parthasarathy ran the drama troupe, United Amateur Artistes (UAA), which staged English and Tamil plays. Soon Jayalalithaa still a schoolgirl, began acting in some plays of Parthasarathy along with her mother and aunt. She acted in small roles in plays such as Tea House of the August Moon and Undersecretary between 1960 and 1964. She also acted as Portia in a drama named The Merchant of Venice.

Shankar Giri, the son of the then Indian Vice-President V. V. Giri, saw her small role in the English play Tea House of the August Moon and was impressed. Shankar Giri approached her mother Sandhya and told he wanted to cast her daughter in an English film called The Epistle. Sandhya reluctantly agreed with the condition that shooting should be held only during weekends or school holidays.

Sandhya had acted in the 1964 Tamil film Karnan, produced and directed by Kannada film-maker B. R. Panthulu. Jayalalithaa accompanied her mother to a party related to the film and was spotted by Panthulu, who then decided to cast her opposite Kalyan Kumar in the Kannada movie Chinnada Gombe. Since Jayalalithaa would be studying for her PUC in two months' time, Sandhya had declined the offer initially. Sandhya agreed when he promised to finish all shooting within two months in order not to interfere with her education. Jayalalithaa started acting and she was paid ₹3,100 (equivalent to ₹180,000 or US$1,900 in 2026). Panthulu kept his promise and completed shooting in six weeks. Jayalalithaa had forgotten all about films after acting in her Kannada debut film and had got ready to attend classes at Stella Maris as she had the ambition to be a lawyer. But the Kannada debut film became a blockbuster in 1964 and she became a well-known face.

Meanwhile, Jayalalithaa continued acting in Parthasarathy's plays. She played the leading role in plays such as Malathi, The Whole Truth, and the dance drama Kaveri Thanda Kalaiselvi between 1960 and 1966. She made her debut as the lead actress in Kannada films while still in school, aged 15, in Chinnada Gombe (1964). She also appeared in a dance sequence of a song named "Malligeya Hoovinantha" in the movie Amarashilpi Jakanachari (1964).

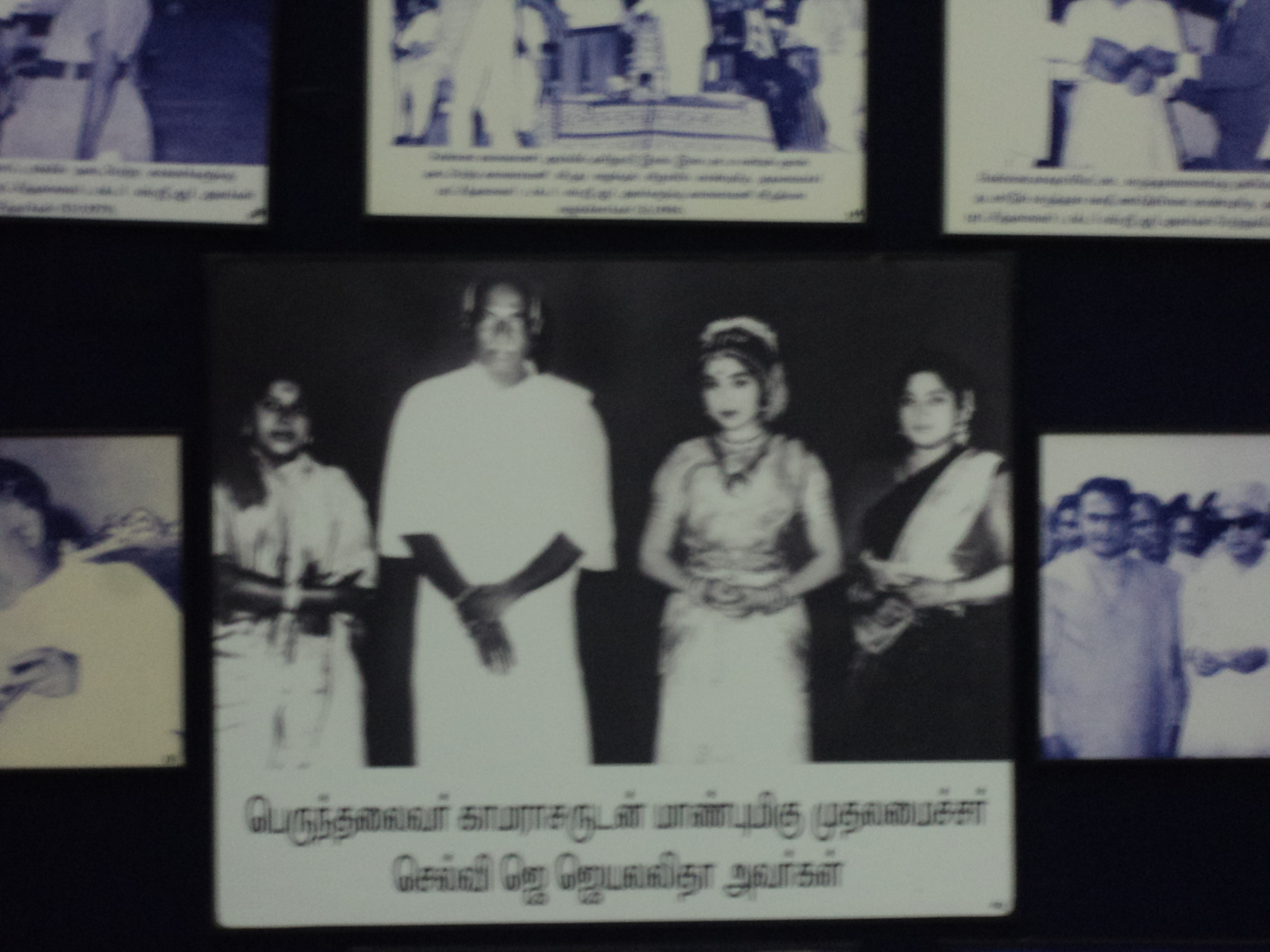
Jayalalithaa along with Madras Chief Minister K. Kamaraj, her mother Sandhya and dance teacher K. J. Sarasa during an Arangetram

She made her debut in Tamil theatre in April 1964, when she played a sales girl in the drama named Undersecretary. Parthasarathy and Sandhya were the lead characters, while Jayalalitha and Cho Ramaswamy were paired together and A. R. Srinivasan was also involved. The play was based on the lives of middle aged couple and Jayalaithaa played character of sales girl in the drama. Her performance caused Parthasarathy to make her lead heroine in a drama named Malathy. Meanwhile, the films she had shot during her vacation in April–May 1964—Chinnada Gombe and Manushulu Mamathalu—became blockbusters. By end of 1965, she had become popular among film producers and directors. She was approached by C. V. Sridhar for her Tamil film debut as well. Between 1964 and 1966 she did around 35 shows of drama named Malathy and later discontinued as she became very busy in films. It was during the year 1964, Sandhya's financial debts had increased and she suggested her daughter make use of the increasing film offers to come her way.

Jayalalithaa's debut in Tamil cinema was the leading role in Vennira Aadai (1965), directed by C. V. Sridhar. She starred in 28 box-office hit films with M.G. Ramachandran between 1965 and 1973. The first film with M.G.R. was B.R. Panthalu's Aayirathil Oruvan in 1965 and their last film together was Pattikaattu Ponnaiya in 1973. She made her debut in Telugu films as the lead actress in Manushulu Mamathalu opposite Akkineni Nageswara Rao. Her last Telugu release was also opposite Akkineni Nageswara Rao in the film Nayakudu Vinayakudu, which was released in 1980. She was the first heroine to appear in skirts in Tamil films. As a heroine, she acted in only one Hindi film, Izzat, in 1968, where she was paired with Dharmendra.

Jayalalithaa donated her gold jewelleries to the then Indian Prime Minister Lal Bahadur Shastri during the Indo-Pakistani War of 1965.

She had 11 successful releases in Tamil in 1966. In the opening credits of Arasa Kattalai, for the first time her name was affixed with the phrase "Kavarchi Kanni". In 1967 she bought her bungalow, Veda Nilayam, in Poes Gardens for ₹132,000 (equivalent to ₹7.7 million or US$82,000 in 2026).

Sandow M. M. A. Chinnappa Thevar was on the lookout for a regular heroine for his production after he had fight with the actress Savitri after the release of Vetaikkaran, and he signed Jayalalithaa on in 1965. She became a regular heroine for production house Devar films from 1966.

Jaishankar was romantically paired with Jayalalithaa in eight Tamil films including Muthu Chippi, Yaar Nee?, Nee!, Vairam, Vandhale Magarasi, Bommalattam (1968), Raja Veetu Pillai and Avalukku Aayiram Kangal, whereas the films Thanga Gopuram and Gowri Kalyanam had him play elder brother to her.

Jayalalithaa acted in twelve films as heroine opposite N. T. Rama Rao, in Telugu—Gopaludu Bhoopaludu (1967), Chikkadu Dorakadu (1967), Tikka Sankaraiah (1968), Niluvu Dopidi (1968), Baghdad Gaja Donga (1968), Kathanayakudu (1969), Kadaladu Vadaladu (1969), Gandikota Rahasyam (1969), Ali Baba 40 Dongalu (1970), Sri Krishna Vijayamu (1970), Sri Krishna Satya (1972), and Devudu Chesina Manushulu (1973). Jayalalitha had eight films with Akkineni Nageswara Rao in Telugu—Manushulu Mamathalu (1965), Aastiparulu (1966), Brahmachari (1968), Aadarsa Kutumbam (1969), Adrushtavanthulu (1969), Bharya Biddalu (1972), Premalu Pellillu (1974) and Nayakudu Vinayakudu (1980).

She also made a guest appearance in Telugu film Navarthi (1966). Her films in Telugu also included two with Krishna and one each with Sobhan Babu, Jaggayya, Ramakrishna and Haranath. She was given on-screen credit as Kalai Selvi in most of her Tamil films since 1967.

=== Later career ===
Between 1965 and 1973, Jayalalithaa starred opposite M. G. Ramachandran in a number of successful films, including Aayirathil Oruvan, Kavalkaran, Adimai Penn, Engal Thangam, Kudiyirundha Koyil, Ragasiya Police 115 and Nam Naadu. Cho Ramaswamy cast her in the lead role in his directorial venture Yarrukkum Vetkam Illai.

She acted with Ravichandran in ten films—Gowri Kalyanam (1966), Kumari Penn (1966), Naan (1967), Magarasi (1967), Maadi Veettu Mappilai (1967), Panakkara Pillai (1968), Moondru Yezhuthu (1968), Andru Kanda Mugam (1968), Avalukku Aayiram Kangal and Baghdad Perazhagi (1974). In 1972, she acted opposite Sivaji Ganesan in Pattikada Pattanama, which went on to win the National Film Award for Best Feature Film in Tamil in 1973.

In 1973, she acted in Sri Krishna Satya, which won her the Filmfare Award for Best Actress in Telugu. Her other films with Sivaji Ganesan include Galatta Kalyanam and Deiva Magan; the latter holds the distinction of being the first Tamil film to be submitted by India for an Academy Award for Best Foreign Language Film.

Jayalalithaa was paired opposite Sivaji Ganesan in 17 films. She acted in six films with R. Muthuraman as a romantic leading pair—Dhikku Theriyadha Kaattil, Thirumangalyam, Kanavan Manaivi, Avandhan Manidhan, Suryagandhi, Anbu Thangai and Muthuraman played supporting roles in Kannan En Kadhalan, Major Chandrakanth, Naan, En Annan, Adi Parashakti, Thaer Thiruvizha, Dharmam Engey, Chitra Pournami and Oru Thaai Makkal. She made her debut in Malayalam with Jesus (1973). Her 100th film was Thirumangalyam (1974), directed by A. Vincent.

She was romantically paired opposite Sivakumar in Kandan Karunai and Sri Krishna Leela. Sivakumar played supporting roles in Shakti Leelai, Yarrukum Vetkam Ilali, Thirumangalyam, Annaivelakanni, Kavalkaran, Motoram Sunderapillai and Ganga Gowri.

In 1972, Jayalalithaa was invited to perform with her dance troupe in Mysore for the Dussehra exhibition. Due to her busy shooting schedule and health reasons, Jayalalithaa had to cancel the performance at the last minute. Vatal Nagaraj's Karnataka-based political outfit condemned her for cancelling her dance performance in spite of being a Kannadiga girl. Jayalalithaa responded by issuing a statement contradicting him in an interview to Vikatan magazine that she was a Tamilian and not a Kannadiga. Jayalalithaa was at Premier studio in Mysuru for the shooting of the B. R. Panthulu's film Ganga Gowri. The group of Kannada activists from Vatal Nagaraj's outfit got to know of this and invaded the studio premises, by managing to climb over the 12 feet high gates, which were locked. The film crew, studio workers and media personnel surrounded her in one corner of the room to guard her, when the protestors entered. The mob surrounded Jayalalithaa and demanded that she withdraw her statement identifying herself as a "Tamil" woman and apologise. Despite director Panthulu urging her to do so to defuse the tense situation, she remained defiant, "I am a Tamil girl, not a Kannada girl.", Jayalalithaa responded loudly in Tamil, refusing to bow even as protestors gathered around her. Finally the Police arrived and dispersed the mob. She then left Mysuru in the same costume she had worn for the film, portraying a goddess. Upon her return to Madras, she thanked the journalists for their support.

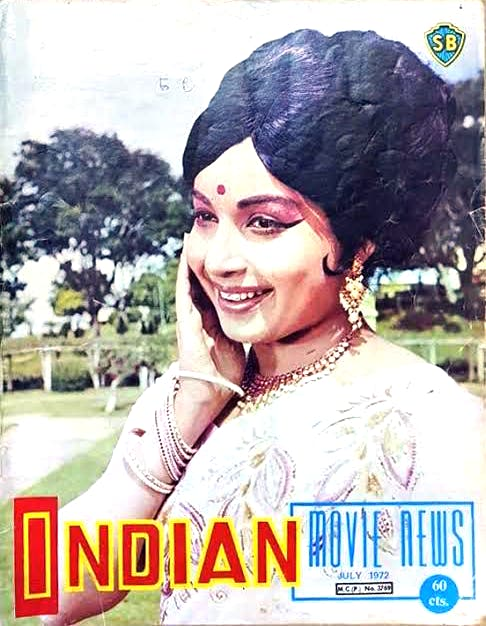
On the cover of the film magazine Indian, July 1972, featuring a still from Engirundho Vandhaal.

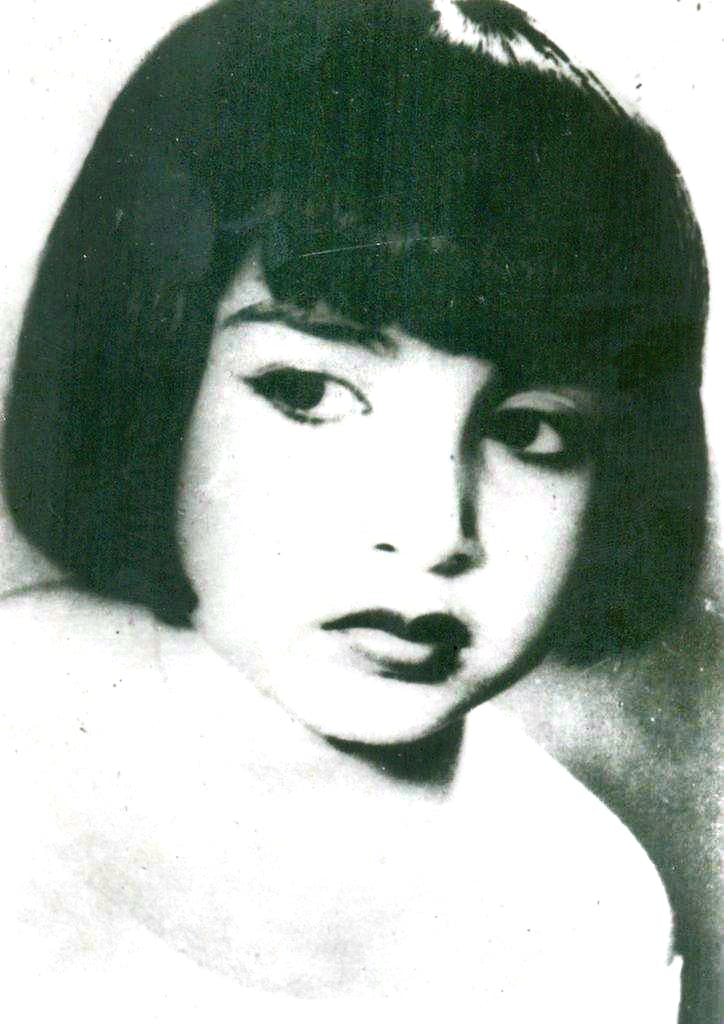
As a child, sporting a bob cut at the insistence of her aunt, Vidyavathi, c. 1952

The heroes of her films never objected to the title of the film being conferred on the female lead played by Jayalalithaa. Adimai Penn, Kanni Thaai, and Kannan En Kadhalan had Ramachandran as the lead male hero but the story and the title was built around the character played by Jayalalithaa. Similarly, Engerindo Vandhaal, Sumathi En Sundari, Paadhukaappu and Anbai Thedi had Sivaji Ganeshan as the male lead but the title and the story was built around her character. She did many female-centric films where the story revolved on her character, such as Vennira Adai, Yaar Nee?, Kumari Penn, Nee, Gowri Kalyanam, Magaraasi, Muthu Chippi, Thanga Gopuram, Avalukku Ayiram Kangal, Annamitta Kai, Vandhaale Magaraasi, Suryagandhi, Thirumangalyam, Yarukkum Vetkam Illai, and Kanavan Manaivi.

She received the title "Nadippuku Ilakkium Vahuthavar" from the then Chief Minister Karunanidhi and also won Tamil Nadu Cinema Fan Award for Best Actress for her 100th film Thirumangalyam in 1974. Her last film in Tamil was Nadhiyai Thedi Vandha Kadal (1980). Her last film as the heroine was Nayakudu Vinayakudu in Telugu, which became the highest grosser of the year in Telugu.

Her successful Kannada films include Badukuva Daari (1966), Mavana Magalu (1965), Nanna Kartavya (1965), Chinnada Gombe (1964) and Mane Aliya (1964). Jayalalithaa holds the record for having been the Tamil actress with maximum silver jubilee hits in her career—85 hits of 92 Tamil films as main female lead heroine and she also has all 28 films in Telugu as silver jubilee hits. She was the highest-paid Indian actress from 1965 to 1980. She made guest appearances in nine films and six of her films were dubbed into Hindi. She had 119 box office hits between 1961 and 1980, of the total 125 films she did as the main female lead. She made a brief appearance in 1992's Neenga Nalla Irukkanum.

She acted in mythological films like Kandan Karunai, Aadhi Parashakti, Shri Krishna Satya, Shri Krishna Vijayam, Shri Rama Katha, Shri Krishna Leela, Shakti Leelai, Ganga Gowri, Annai Velankanni and Jesus. Her period dramas include Ayirathil Oruvan, Neerum Neruppum, Mani Magudam, Adimai Penn, Ali Baba 40 Dongalu, Arasa Katalai, and Baghdad Perazhagi.

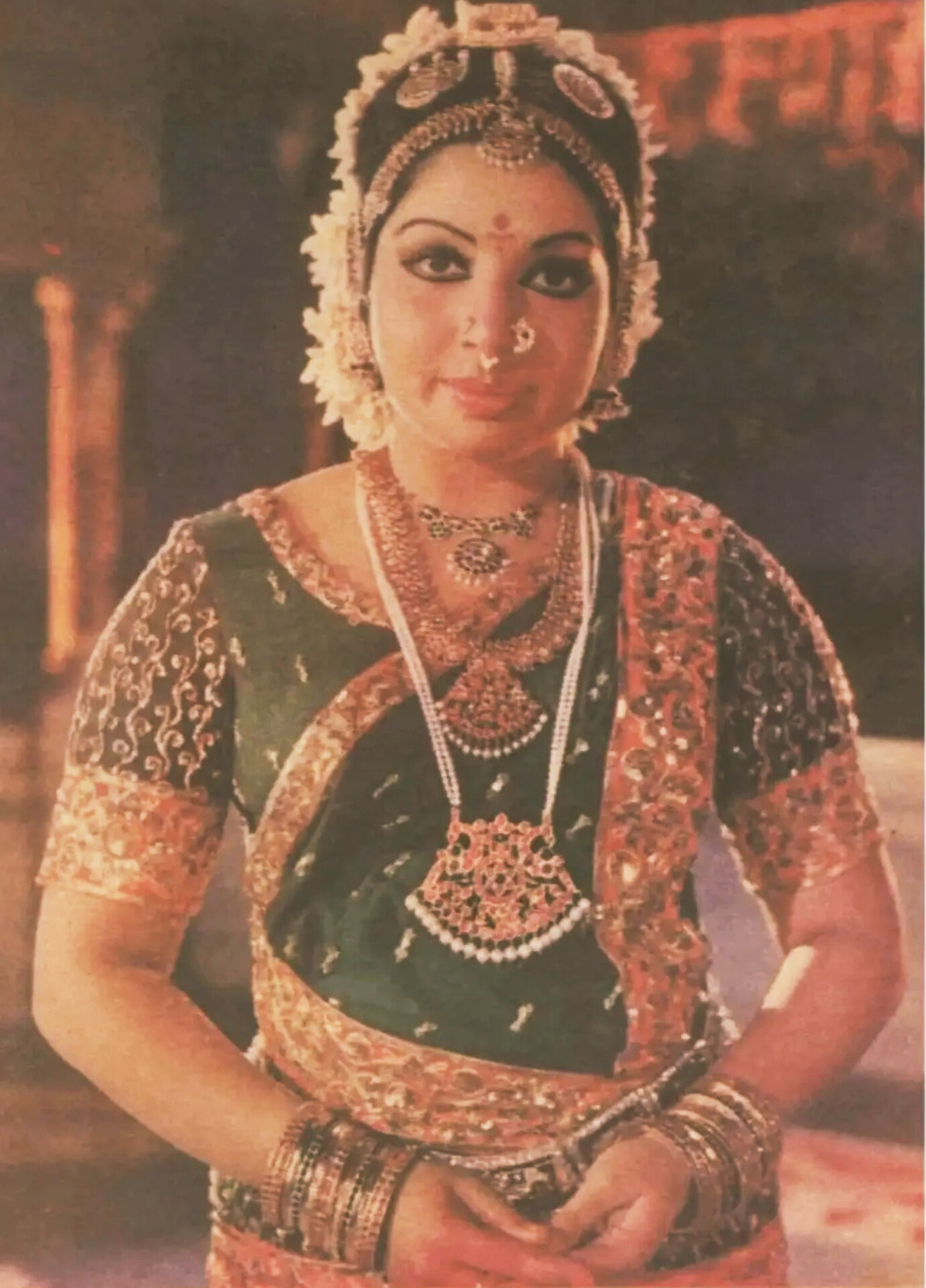
Jayalalithaa in Bharatanatyam attire for a song sequence in Paattum Bharathamum movie, 1975

She acquired the reputation of being a multi-faceted actor equally comfortable in fantasy and mythological genres as well as in modern social dramas and hence in 1969, in Tamil Conference, she was given the tag of "Kaveri Thandha Kalai Selvi".

She, Savitri and Saroja Devi have been cited as the female superstars of Tamil cinema. She did double roles in eight films. She also sung few songs. During the filming of Ayirathil Oruvan, MGR complimented her, comparing her boldness to P. Bhanumathi.

She received Special Award from Filmfare for her performances in 'Chandhrodhayam', 'Adimai Penn' and 'Engirundho Vandhaal' in the years 1966, 1969 and 1970 as the Filmfare Award for Best Actress was introduced only in 1972. Her performance in Pattikada Pattanama, Suryagandhi were critically acclaimed and won her consecutive Filmfare Award for Best Actress in 1972 and 1973, respectively.

From 1968 to 1973, at the peak of her career she took interviews and wrote columns in the magazines like Bommai. She wrote a column-"Ennangal Sila" in magazine Thuglak in the 1970s. She also wrote a short story, "Oravin Kaidhigal", for the magazine Kalki, "Manadhai Thotta Malargal" for Thaai magazine in the early 1980s. She wrote about her own life in a serialised memoir in the Tamil weekly magazine Kumudam.

Around 1977, Jayalalithaa was initially considered for Bharathiraja's proposed debut film Sontha Veedu (transl. Own House) but withdrew after being advised against working with a debutant director, and the shelved screenplay was later adapted into Bharathiraja's 1982 film Pudhumai Penn. In 1980, she decided to voluntarily decline any new film offers. An Australia-based journalist Brian Laul took over the mantle of Piousji ('Khaas Bhat'- The filmi gossip column) wrote an article specifying Jayalalithaa was trying for a comeback but was not being offered any roles. Jayalalithaa chose to respond to him by writing a letter, in which she mentioned that she was not struggling to make any comeback and that she turned down the offer from producer Balaji to star in Billa (1980) alongside Rajinikanth. She added she wanted to pursue other interests and was not interested in pursuing her film career any further.

Her closest friends from film industry included Manorama, Cho Ramaswamy, Rajasree, Jamuna, Saroja Devi, Kumari Sachu, Anjali Devi, Sowcar Janaki, Sukumari, Ravichandran, R. Muthuraman, Nagesh, M. N. Nambiar, Vennira Aadai Nirmala, S. A. Asokan, Jaishankar, V. K. Ramasamy, Major Sundarrajan, P. Susheela, Sheela, M. S. Viswanathan, L. R. Eswari, R.S.Manohar. Jayalalithaa was fluent in Tamil, Telugu, Kannada, and Malayalam, and often switched between these languages while conversing with her co-stars according to their native language.

She quoted on M. G. Ramachandran, "He was a very warm and caring kind of a person. And after Mother died, he replaced her in my life. He was everything to me. He was mother, father, brother, friend, philosopher, guide. Everything. He sort of took over my life." In many of her interviews she often said she entered films on being asked by her mother and entered politics on request by M. G. Ramachandran. Jayalalithaa had fallen out with MGR in 1973, after he chooses to work with another upcoming actresses like Latha and Manjula and was leading a quiet life, reading books and writing for Tamil magazines. She shared a close rapport with writers Sivasankari and Indhumathi before entering politics. A childhood friend, Sivasankari noted that they had trained together under K. J. Sarasa, and fondly recalled meeting Jayalalithaa, whom she called “Ammu” (who in turn called her “Jibu”), at the popular Madras restaurant Gaylord during breaks from film shoots. She further recalled that after 1966, when her family lived in Cathedral Garden on Anna Salai, Jayalalithaa would often visit her home whenever she had time, sometimes even arriving during shooting breaks in full make-up, sharing meals and conversing freely about her day. In 1981, She received training in Carnatic music from B. Rajam Iyer, who visited her residence in Poes Garden, with the arrangement facilitated by Sivasankari. Writer Indhumathi recalled that both studied at the University of Mysore around 1980, with Jayalalithaa in Political Science and herself in Psychology, attending early morning classes in Chennai. Under the instruction of Chief Minister MGR, Both she and Indumathi explored locations in Royapettah and arranged machinery to start a press magazine, with Jayalalithaa as publisher and Indhumathi as editor, in the late 1980. However, the plan was abandoned following a sudden turning point in 1981 during the 5th World Tamil Conference (Tamil Thiruvizha), organized by MGR in Madurai, where Jayalalithaa choreographed and performed in a dance-drama titled Cauvery Thantha Kalaiselvi ("The Artistic Daughter Bequeathed by the Cauvery") on the evening of 9 January. This event further revived her relationship with him. Jayalalithaa and Sobhan Babu starred together in the Telugu film Doctor Babu. While on set, they developed a close friendship, which led to speculation about a personal relationship between them. Although they became friends, sources indicate that rumours of a deeper relationship or marriage were unfounded, particularly since Sobhan Babu was already married at the time. Jayalalithaa openly told Tamil magazine Kumudum that they were "going steady". During the Indian Cinema Golden Jubilee celebrations held by MGR government at the University of Madras Centenary Auditorium in 1980, Jayalalithaa was assigned to co-host the event with Sowcar Janaki, who had initially been assigned sole responsibility for hosting it but reportedly left in protest after being informed of the change only a few hours before the event, stating that Jayalalithaa could host it alone. After that event, MGR was also reportedly displeased with Doordarshan's telecast of the inaugural ceremony, alleging that it showed the President Neelam Sanjiva Reddy lighting the ceremonial lamp while giving little prominence to Jayalalithaa handing the kuthuvilakku to the President. Before entering politics, she reportedly underwent liposuction in the United States despite opposition from some of her friends and family. She later sent her cousins before-and-after photographs to show the change in her figure and was reportedly pleased with the results.

== Early political career ==
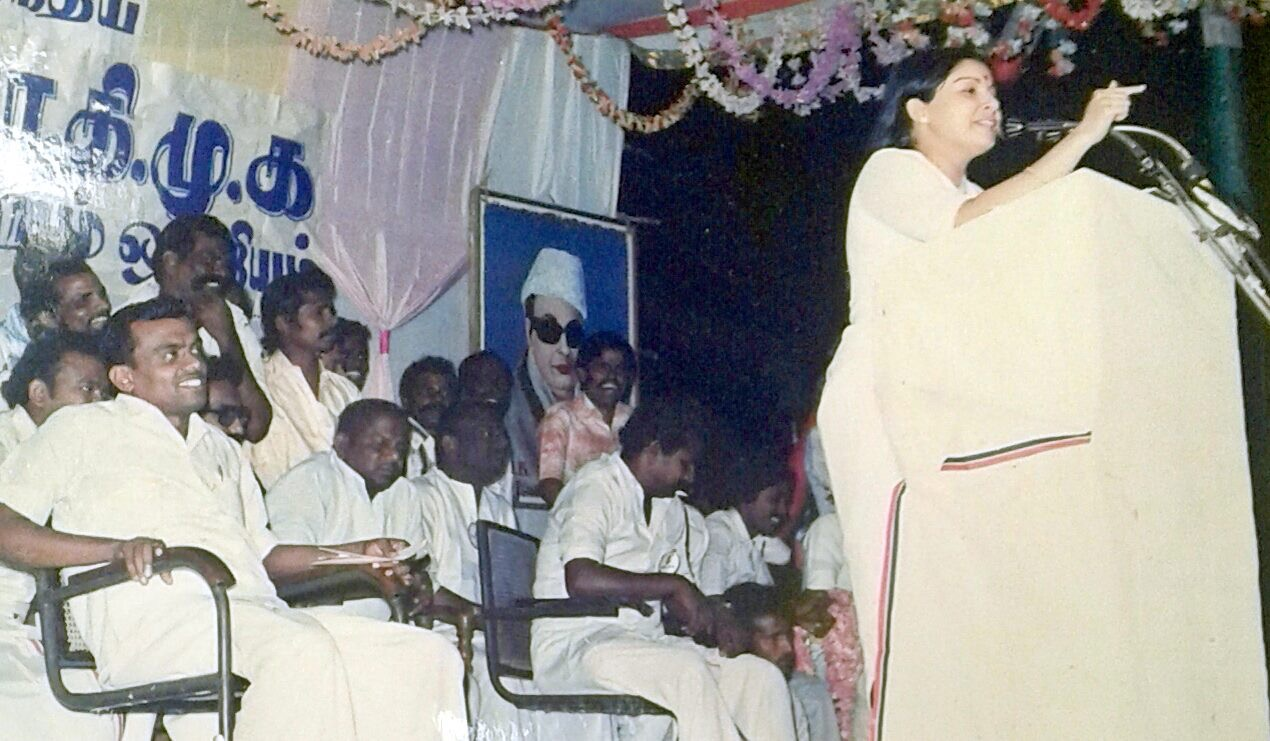
Jayalalithaa at a public meeting in 1980s

Jayalalithaa denied claims that M.G.R., who had been chief minister for the state since 1977, was instrumental in introducing her to politics. According to The Hindu former journalist T. A. Narasimhan, Jayalalithaa informally advised MGR on political matters even before joining the AIADMK. During the June 1979 Thanjavur Lok Sabha by-election, Indira Gandhi considered contesting the seat and sought MGR’s support, while Jayalalithaa reportedly urged him to back her, predicting her political comeback and imminent mid-term polls. However, MGR later withdrew support, a move that contributed to the DMK–Congress (I) alliance and the AIADMK’s setback in the 1980 Lok Sabha election. Narasimhan also stated that when MGR backed Charan Singh’s short-lived government in July 1979, Jayalalithaa warned him that the Janata government would collapse “before the Skylab fell,” accurately predicting Indira Gandhi’s return to power. These incidents reportedly convinced MGR of Jayalalithaa’s political foresight, and Narasimhan further alleges that she occasionally reviewed official government files sent from the Secretariat to her residence. In 1980, she had expressed her desire to join politics to MGR, who advised her not to rush. She had already been interested in public affairs and closely followed national developments. In 1982, she reiterated her intention to enter politics, upon which AIADMK founder M.G.R. gave her a book titled Annaism, outlining the principles of the party, and encouraged her to study extensively. After reading it, she joined the AIADMK two months later, on 4 June 1982. Her maiden public speech,"Pennin Perumai" (The Greatness of a Woman) and the schemes that touched their lives, was delivered at the AIADMK's political conference in the same year at Cuddalore on 20 June and was well received. On that day, She also assumed a prominent position on a procession float that moved through the streets, an event criticised by the opposition DMK, which referred to it as the “Cuddalore cabaret”. Her struggles were further compounded by gender-based criticism, particularly in the early years of her career, including an instance in which a quotation she attributed to Mahatma Gandhi, “This body has been given to us only in order that we may serve all mankind with it,” was reportedly misrepresented by then Chepauk DMK MLA Rahman Khan. Even the then Prime Minister Indira Gandhi and the Rajya Sabha member Khushwant Singh came to witness her speech which was widely acclaimed for its clarity of diction and elegant prose. Her seat number in Rajya Sabha was 185, which was coincidentally the same as that of what C. N. Annadurai had while he was a member in the Rajya Sabha. On 28 January 1983, she became propaganda secretary for the party succeeding R. Manimaran, who was an MLA and party's chief whip in the Tamil Nadu assembly and she campaigned extensively for victory of the party candidate Udangudi R. Amirtharaj in the by-election for the Tiruchendur Assembly constituency in February that year, playing a key role in countering opposition allegations over the Tiruchendur temple controversy and drawing large crowds, particularly among women voters. Following her speech at Tiruchendur, DMK leader Karunanidhi called her a “comet,” implying that her rise was sudden and meteoric. In a January 1984 interview with Junior Vikatan, Jayalalithaa praised the welfare initiatives of MGR, such as the Nutritious Meal Programme and rural development initiatives, which reflected Mahatma Gandhi’s vision of “Gram Rajya” and had significantly benefited village communities, noting that these achievements drew her toward politics. Speaking about her new role as the AIADMK’s propaganda secretary, she described herself as a bridge between party cadres and the leadership. She emphasized that party policy was determined by MGR and that her speeches reflected his ideas. She also noted that she helped streamline party propaganda by issuing guidelines, organizing communication, and standardizing the list of authorized spokespersons. Responding to questions about wielding extra-constitutional authority, she denied seeking personal gain in politics, asserting that she had entered public life with the aim of service rather than profit or fame. She affirmed her loyalty to MGR’s leadership and stated that she would remain steadfast even in the face of political setbacks. On 4 April 1984, Jayalalithaa donated 1.65 lakh rupees from her personal funds and established the "Annai Sandhya Memorial Nutritious Meal Centre" at Sakkaravala Nallur, near Devipattinam, a place believed to be associated with her maternal family roots in Ramanathapuram district in memory of her late mother Sandhya.

Filmstar MPs

"This lovely lass has taken her place in the centre of India's political stage and, being a Hindi-speaking Tamilian, is assured of a central role for many years to come."

— Khushwant Singh, Filmstar MPs, Sunday, 27 April 1985

M.G.R. wanted her to be a member of the Rajya Sabha because of her fluency in English. She defeated Arcot N. Veeraswami, who is the senior DMK leader in 1984 Rajya Sabha elections. Indira Gandhi lauded Jayalalithaa for the various speeches she made on issues including the one on internal security in Rajya Sabha. Jayalalithaa was elected to that body in 1984 and retained her seat until 1989. On 26 July 1984, during her speech in the Rajya Sabha, Jayalalithaa also criticised the special constitutional status of Jammu and Kashmir under Article 370, supported stronger integration of the state with the Indian Union, and questioned why it should not be brought fully under the Constitution of India, views later seen as being in consonance with the BJP’s position on Kashmir. Jayalalithaa was one of the 16 special guests who were invited to participate the state dinner hosted by then Indian Prime Minister Indira Gandhi in honour of Erstwhile Yugoslavian President Veselin Djuranovic at Rashtrapati Bhavan in August 1984. Her success in her role as propaganda secretary caused resentment among high-ranking members of the party. By engineering a rift between her and M.G.R., these members influenced M.G.R. to stop her writing about her personal life in a Tamil magazine. Despite these machinations, she remained admired by the rank and file of the party. She was given key responsibilities, including in the implementation of the landmark noon-meals scheme when M. G. Ramachandran was the chief minister and this taught her lessons in welfare politics. Soon after Jayalalithaa's entry into the AIADMK and her elevation as its Propaganda Secretary in 1983, a caucus — the Jayalalitha Narpani Manram (Jayalalitha Good Deeds Club) and similar associations were started in her name by supporters. In 1986, the Jayalalitha Peravai (Jayalalitha Conference) was formed by then Tiruchengode Loksabha MP and Jayalalithaa Loyalist Salem Kannan, which later transformed into the Puratchi Thalaivi Amma Peravai after MGR's demise. MGR was upset with these parallel outfits and suspected that all of this was done with Jayalalithaa's blessings, though she denied any knowledge of it. In the party's official mouthpiece Anna, Chief Minister MGR warned the cadres on various occasions in the period of 1983-87 against the functioning of such associations, stating it was a breach of party discipline, and warned that failure to disband them would invite disciplinary action. On 25 May 1984, Jayalalithaa submitted her resignation as the AIADMK's Propaganda Secretary, but MGR initially declined to accept it. However, supposedly under MGR's instructions, she officially resigned from the post on 20 August 1984, in an effort to appease the disgruntled leaders within the party. In her resignation letter, she noted that it had increasingly seemed as though she was solely blamed for the confusion and divisions within the party. MGR subsequently accepted her resignation. Later when M.G.R. fell ill, she campaigned extensively for the party before the 1984 Tamil Nadu Legislative Assembly election.

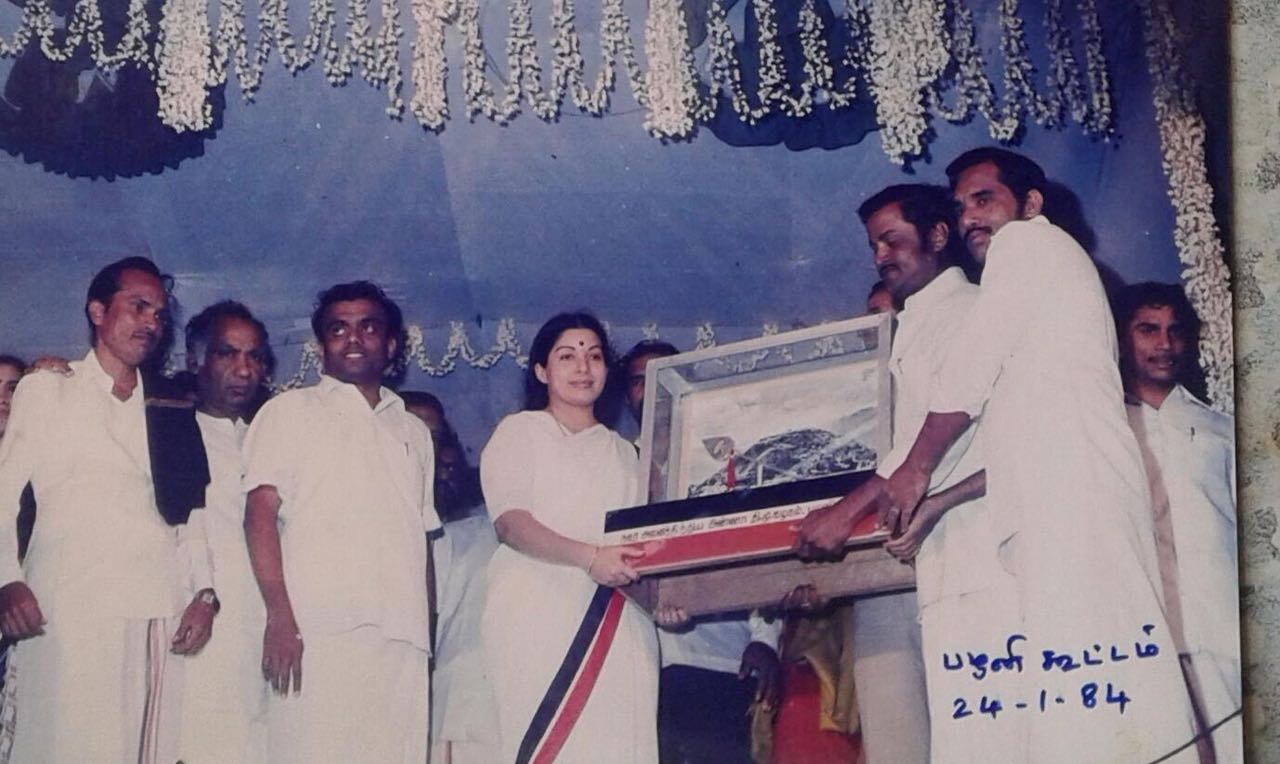
Jayalalithaa at a meeting in Palani in 1984

In 1984, when M.G.R. was incapacitated due to a stroke, Jayalalithaa was said to have attempted to take over the position of chief minister or the party on the pretext that his health would prevent him from the proper execution of his duties. She successfully led the campaign in the 1984 general elections, in which the AIADMK allied with the Congress. On the midnight of 31 December 1984, when MGR was in United States, Jayalalithaa was unceremoniously turned out of Tamil Nadu House, which was her official residence as a Rajya Sabha M.P. by the coterie against her. On 20 January 1985, AIADMK General Secretary P. U. Shanmugam announced the removal of Jayalalithaa from her position as Deputy Leader of the AIADMK Parliamentary Party, after she had served in the role for eight months, citing a letter purportedly sent by the recuperating MGR from New York. Jayalalithaa strongly refuted the authenticity of the letter, describing it as "100 Percent Bogus". After her earlier unsuccessful attempts to see MGR during his one month hospitalisation at Apollo Hospitals in Madras until November 1984, Jayalalithaa refrained from visiting him at Brooklyn Hospital in New York for the next three months. On the early hours of 4 February 1985, she waited over three and a half hours in the Meenambakkam Airport's VIP lounge with an impressive garland to welcome MGR upon his return from the US, but was not allowed to meet him. MGR became upset when he learned that she had discussed political matters with Prime Minister Rajiv Gandhi, and their relationship grew strained.

Jayalalithaa wrote a letter expressing her grievances, which Salem Kannan delivered to MGR at the Secretariat. After reading it, MGR reportedly broke down. The deadlock ended on 19 February 1985, when they met for an hour at the State Secretariat and resolved their differences. Jayalalithaa later accompanied MGR to his car before leaving.

She was reappointed as the Propaganda Secretary of the party on 5 September 1985. The famous photograph, taken at a massive two-day conference of the All-World MGR Fans Club organised by the party at Tamukkam Ground in Madurai in July 1986, soon after the party's debacle in the local body elections, depicts Jayalalithaa presenting a silver sceptre (Sengol) to MGR, who then returned it to her, indicating that she was his political heir and passing the baton of succession.

In the early hours of 24 December 1987, upon hearing of M. G. Ramachandran’s death, Jayalalithaa proceeded to his residence at Ramavaram Garden, where she was reportedly denied entry. She then travelled to Rajaji Hall, where his body had been taken for public homage. At the venue, she positioned herself near MGR's head and stood beside his mortal remains for approximately 13 hours on the first day (24 Dec), dressed in a black saree, and for about 8 hours on the second day (25 Dec), wearing her trademark white saree with the AIADMK tricolour border, totaling around 21 hours of vigil. She remained there despite facing resistance and alleged physical harassment from supporters of V. N. Janaki, continuing to stand her ground throughout the mourning period. Following his funeral in 1987, AIADMK split into two factions: one supported his widow, V. N. Janaki This faction was called AIADMK (JA) and the other favoured Jayalalithaa called AIADMK (J). Jayalalithaa faction was supported by senior leaders like V. R. Nedunchezhiyan, Panruti S. Ramachandran, Aranganayagam, KKSSR Ramachandran, Thirunavukarasar. On 1 January 1988, Jayalalithaa was elected as the general secretary of AIADMK by the leaders of her faction and it was ratified by the party general council convened by her on the next day. Janaki was selected as the Chief Minister on 7 January 1988 with the support of 96 members. On 13 January 1988, while Chief Minister V. N. Janaki was in Delhi seeking support from Prime Minister Rajiv Gandhi, the AIADMK headquarters in Chennai became the scene of the first direct clash between her faction and that of Jayalalithaa. Both groups had announced executive meetings at the same venue, leading to heavy police deployment; however, Janaki’s camp later cancelled its meeting and locked the office. Jayalalithaa attempted to enter the premises with her supporters but was stopped, and a lathi charge ensued when they tried to proceed, leaving several leaders of her faction injured. She then staged a brief protest outside the gates before being detained and taken to her Poes Garden residence, where police initially termed it protective custody and later released her; the episode generated public sympathy for her faction in the internal party conflict. On the eve of the confidence vote, Jayalalithaa was reported to have offered the support of a faction of AIADMK MLAs to G. K. Moopanar to enable him to become Chief Minister, a proposal said to have been conveyed to Rajiv Gandhi but opposed by some Congress leaders who favoured Sivaji Ganesan. during the assembly proceedings, seven Congress MLAs aligned with the Sivaji faction were reported to have resigned. Amid disruptions and restricted access to the House, Janaki won a motion of confidence in the house on 26 January 1988, due in part to irregularities by speaker P. H. Pandian, who dismissed six members to ease her victory. However, Rajiv Gandhi used Article 356 of the Constitution of India to dismiss the Janaki-led government and impose president's rule on the state following which the Governor's recommendation. Later in December 1988, Jayalalithaa accused then ruling Congress at the centre of using President's rule to advance its political interests in Tamil Nadu. The Election Commission of India froze the "Two Leaves" symbol on 17 December 1988 and given Janaki with Double Pigeon symbol name of AIADMK (JA) and Jayalalithaa with Cock symbol name of AIADMK (J).

At the age of 41, Jayalalithaa entered the Assembly successfully contesting the subsequent 1989 elections on the basis of being M.G.R.'s political heir.

== Leader of the Opposition (1989) ==
She was elected to the Tamil Nadu Legislative Assembly in 1989 as a representative of the Bodinayakkanur constituency at age of 41. The Jayalalithaa-led faction of the AIADMK won 27 seats and Jayalalithaa became the Leader of the Opposition in Tamil Nadu Legislative Assembly. She was the first Indian actress and first woman to become an opposition leader in India. On 9 February 1989, the two factions of AIADMK merged and they unanimously accepted Jayalalithaa as the general secretary of the party and the "Two leaves" symbol of the party was restored.

=== Attack in the Legislative Assembly ===
Following reports on 19 March 1989 that a resignation letter purportedly written by Jayalalithaa, expressing her intention to resign her Assembly membership and retire from politics, had been recovered from the residence of M. Natarajan, the husband of her aide Sasikala, the letter was published in newspapers. The letter, which was addressed to the Speaker of the Tamil Nadu Legislative Assembly, M. Tamilkudimagan, subsequently reached the Speaker, who sought clarification from Jayalalithaa. Jayalalithaa denied reports that she had resigned from the Assembly or intended to quit politics. On 25 March 1989, during the Assembly session, tensions escalated around 11:00 IST. Kumari Ananthan and Jayalalithaa subsequently raised points of order, requesting that their privilege notices be taken up immediately. The Speaker declined to do so and called on Chief Minister Karunanidhi to present the budget. Jayalalithaa then demanded Karunanidhi's resignation, alleging that he had committed criminal acts. A confrontation followed between members of the DMK and AIADMK, during which budget papers were torn and Karunanidhi's spectacles were broken. An AIADMK member pushed the table separating the treasury and opposition benches, causing the podium to strike Karunanidhi and causing him to lose his balance.

As claimed by the party and a section of the members present in the assembly, amidst heavy violence inside the house among the ruling DMK party members and the opposition, Jayalalithaa was attacked by the ruling DMK members in front of the assembly speaker M. Tamilkudimagan when violence broke out between DMK and AIADMK MLA's after she called Karunanidhi a criminal as he began presenting the Budget. At the peak of the situation, Jayalalithaa was about to leave the house, she vowed to not enter the house "until as a Chief Minister" (she also resigned as leader of opposition in December 1989 and appointed S. R. Radha as LoP). In spite of some sections of media terming it as a theatrics, it received a lot of media coverage and sympathy from the public. During the 1989 general elections, Jayalalithaa emphasized the need for a stable government at the Centre as its main poll plank, while an Assembly incident in March involving DMK MLAs, which drew public attention, also figured in the political discourse. The AIADMK allied with the Congress party and was handed a significant victory by winning 38 out of 39 lok sabha seats in Tamil Nadu. The AIADMK, under her leadership, also won the by-elections in Marungapuri and Madurai East assembly constituencies in March 1989 and Peranamallur assembly constituency in November 1989.

=== Car Accident, 1990 ===
In the early hours of 24 February 1990, which was also her 42nd birthday, Jayalalithaa was returning to Chennai from Pondicherry after concluding a late-night campaign the previous day for the Congress–AIADMK alliance in the Pondicherry Assembly elections, accompanied by her close aide Sasikala. Near Meenambakkam Airport, the Hindustan Contessa Classic car in which she was travelling was hit by a lorry, leaving her seriously injured. She was admitted to Devaki Hospital in Mylapore, where Rajiv Gandhi later visited her.

== First term as Chief Minister (1991–1996) ==
In 1991, following the assassination of Rajiv Gandhi days before the elections, her alliance with the Indian National Congress enabled her to ride the wave of sympathy that gave the coalition victory. The AIADMK alliance with the Congress won 225 out of the 234 seats contested in Tamil Nadu Assembly Election and won all 39 constituencies in the centre. Jayalalithaa filed her nomination papers in two Assembly constituencies, Kangeyam and Bargur, stating that the decision was not due to any uncertainty about her electoral prospects and that she was confident of winning from any constituency. She was subsequently elected from both constituencies, and later resigned from Kangeyam, retaining the Bargur seat. Re-elected to the assembly, she became the state's youngest chief minister, and the first woman to serve a full term, serving from 24 June 1991 to 12 May 1996. After assuming the office on 24 June 1991, she declined the official residence allotted on Greenways Road and continued to reside at Veda Nilayam in Poes Garden, which subsequently gained prominence comparable to MGR's Ramavaram Garden. Jayalalithaa initially refused to accept her salary as Chief Minister, as she had "abundant sources of income". When compelled to accept it, she reportedly drew a nominal salary of Re. 1 per month (The lowest of any indian chief minister), for the first 27 months of her tenure.

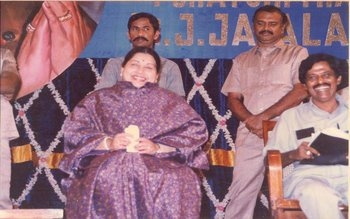
Jayalalithaa at an event during her first tenure as Chief Minister

In 1992, her government introduced the "Cradle Baby Scheme". At that time the ratio of male to female in some parts of Tamil Nadu was skewed by the practice of female infanticide and the abortion of female foetuses. The government established centres in some areas, these being equipped to receive and place into adoption unwanted female babies. It was also promoted by Thottil Kuzhandhai (1995 film). The scheme was extended in 2011. Her party had 226 elected members to the assembly. Her government was the first to introduce police stations operated solely by women. She introduced 30% quota for women in all police jobs and established as many as 57 all-women police stations. There were other all-women establishments like libraries, stores, banks and co-operative elections. She began to be referred as Thanga Gopuram, Thanga Silai ('Golden Statue') by her followers.

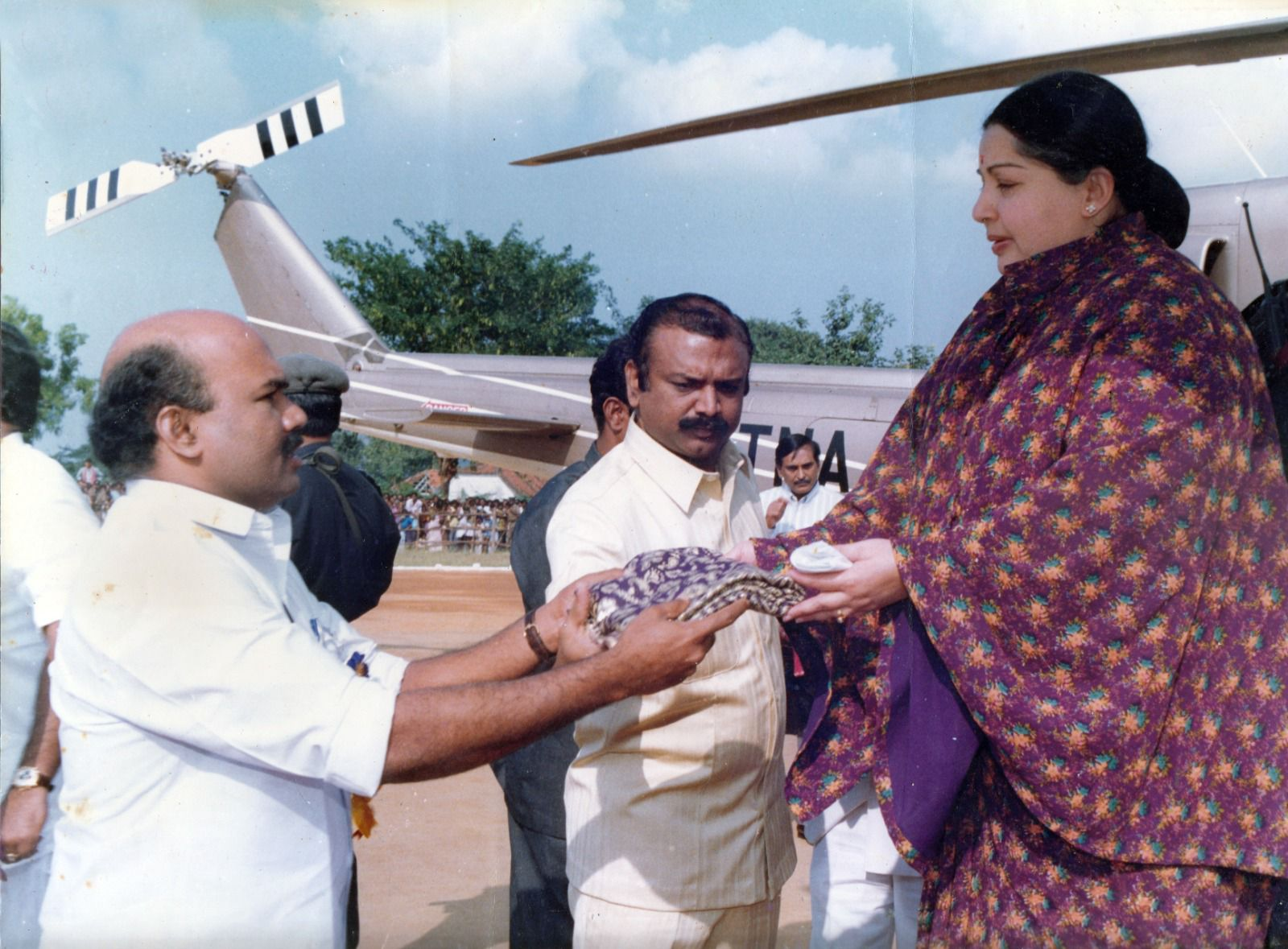
Jayalalithaa being welcomed by Minister D. Jayakumar as she arrives at helicopter

In 1992, Chief Minister Jayalalithaa's visit to the Mahamaham festival in Kumbakonam coincided with a fatal stampede that killed 48 people. The tragedy occurred on 18 February 1992, as a stampede broke out near the Mahamaham tank after a large crowd attempted to descend at the same time, partly due to the VIP presence. Jayalalithaa and her aide, V.K. Sasikala, were present, and the incident was a significant political setback for her government. On 28 June 1992, Jayalalithaa, speaking at a three-day AIADMK victory conference held at the Race Course Ground in Madurai, stated that her electoral success was achieved not “on the blood of” Rajiv Gandhi (sympathy wave following his assassination on 21 May 1991), but through the support of the common public. Her remarks drew criticism from sections of the Congress, accusing her of undermining the sacrifice of Rajiv Gandhi.

According to accounts attributed to close bureaucratic sources, barely 15 months into her first tenure as Chief Minister, Jayalalithaa met Governor Bishma Narain Singh at Raj Bhavan on the evening of 5 August 1992 and reportedly submitted her resignation, citing allegations of corruption and misconduct against certain party functionaries, as well as controversies surrounding the activities of Sasikala’s husband, M. Natarajan, including alleged attempts to engineer defections of MLAs, which he denied. The Governor, however, persuaded her to reconsider. As a result, She changed her decision the next day, and the letter was returned, amid concerns about political instability in the State. At the National Integration Council meeting in Delhi on 23 November 1992, Jayalalithaa said the Babri Masjid dispute should be settled by the Supreme Court of India, while supporting kar seva and urging that the views of the majority (Hindu) community should not be ignored. According to L. K. Advani, while most parties at the meeting criticised the Bharatiya Janata Party, Her speech altered the atmosphere of the gathering and led to better coordination and cordial relations between the BJP and the AIADMK. Following the Demolition of the Babri Masjid in Ayodhya on 6 December 1992, which sparked nationwide unrest but not in Tamil Nadu. Due to the differences with the centre, Jayalalithaa withdrew support to the Congress government at the Centre on 9 March 1993 and realigned later around September 1995. Her government claimed that around 3 a.m. on 4 May 1993, sentry personnel at Veda Nilayam sighted a glider-type aircraft making two or three sorties over the Poes Garden residence of Jayalalithaa, following intelligence warnings of a possible threat from the banned Srilankan based LTTE, and also demanded a No-fly zone and enhanced aerial security from the Centre.

In July 1993, she observed fast for 80 hours (four days) near the MGR Memorial on the Marina beach, demanding that Karnataka release Kaveri water for the kuruvai crop. She ended her fast only after Prime Minister P.V. Narasimha Rao sent his Cabinet colleague and Union Water Resources Minister V.C. Shukla to Chennai to assure her that the centre would set up two committees to ensure implementation of the 1991-interim award of the Tribunal. In October 1993, The Washington Post described Jayalalithaa as an iconic figure to her supporters, comparing her appeal to that of Elvis Presley, John F. Kennedy, Lauren Bacall and Ronald Reagan. However, Cho Ramaswamy, who had endorsed her in the 1991 election campaign, began criticising her excesses, remarking, "She's lost her balance." Her political rival Subramanian Swamy likened his confrontation with her to fighting Idi Amin 10 times over, declaring, "I'm not fighting a woman, I'm fighting a demon."

Juliet – The Convoy

The convoy of former Chief Minister J. Jayalalithaa was reportedly codenamed "Juliet". Security arrangements for the convoy reportedly included "zero traffic" protocols, advance route clearance, and the preparation of three alternative routes (A, B, and C). Reports also stated that around 400–500 police personnel were deployed for convoy security operations.

On 20 January 1994, Mother Teresa called on Chief Minister Jayalalithaa at her Poes Garden residence in Chennai and lauded her welfare projects for girls, destitute women and the aged. Mother Teresa reportedly said that she and Jayalalithaa, India's then only female chief minister, were "working for and fulfilling the same noble cause". Mother Teresa said she would pray daily for Jayalalithaa, whose projects included the Cradle Baby Scheme (CBS) Mother Teresa was also present at the State function on the International Women's Day on 9 March 1994 at Chennai, which Jayalalithaa later recalled as "memorable event in my life". In 1995, Jayalalithaa government organised the 8th World Tamil Conference from 1 to 5 January at Thanjavur.

She first invited Ford Motor Company to establish business in Tamil Nadu in 1995. This was followed by numerous companies setting up factories here especially from automobiles sector which included Hyundai Motor, which led to an influx of the South Korean community into Chennai, as well as BMW, Daimler, Renault, Nissan, Mitsubishi, Wright and Yamaha. Due to this, Madras (now Chennai) began to be called as the Detroit of India under her first term. Royal Enfield made significant expansion in Tamil Nadu and apart from Ashok Leyland, TAFE and TVS Motors became key players in Tamil Nadu.

=== Reservations ===
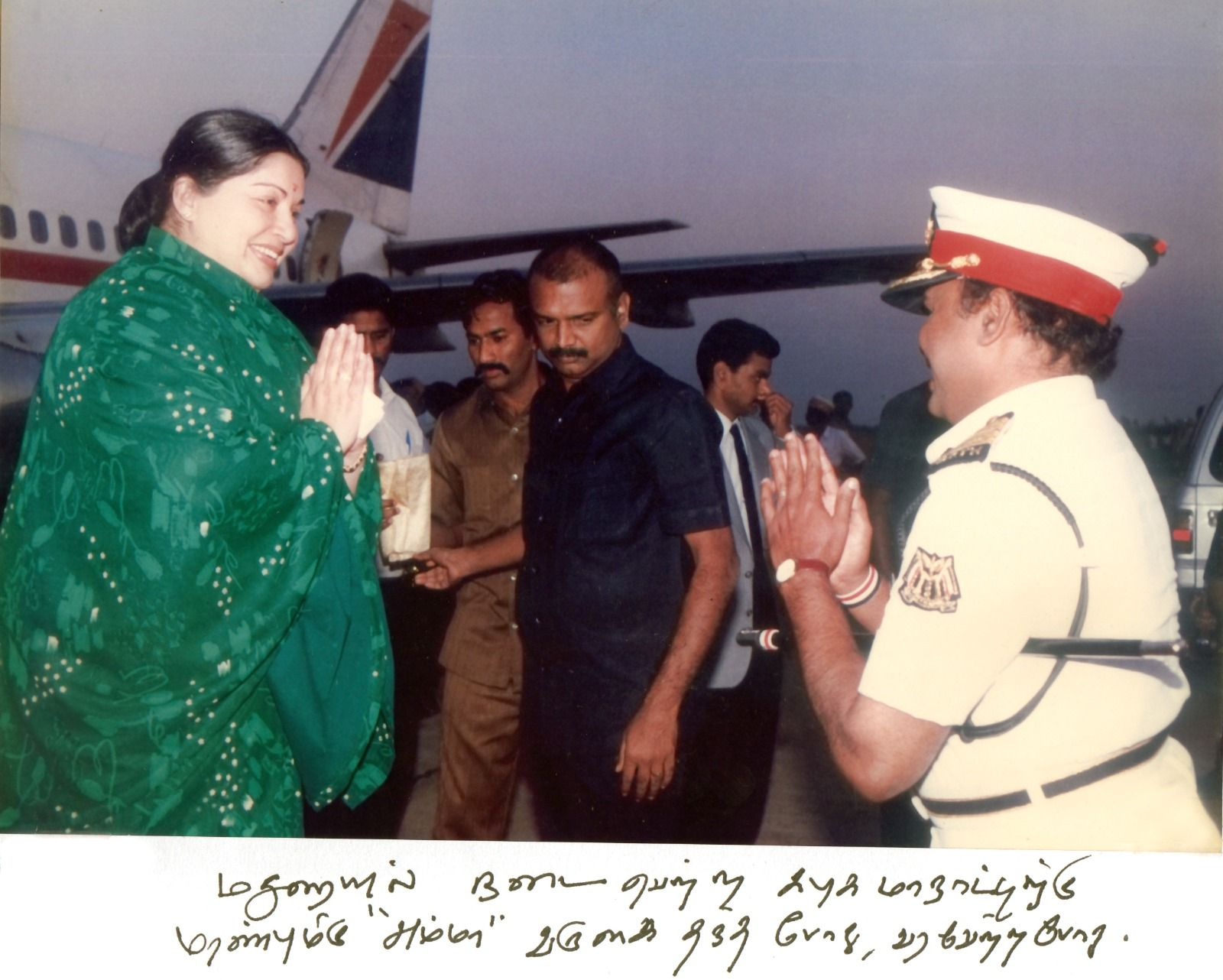
Jayalalithaa arriving at Madurai Airport for AIADMK party Conference

In 1992, The Supreme Court Verdict about reservations stated that the overall amount allowed should not exceed 50% as per Article 16(4). It endangered the 69 Percent Reservation in Tamil Nadu.

In 1993, the Tamil Nadu Backward Classes, Scheduled Castes, and Scheduled Tribes Bill, 1993 was passed by the Assembly (Act 45 of 1994). The Bill was sent to the President Shankar Dayal Sharma for his approval. J Jayalalithaa's AIADMK government led a cross-party committee of Tamil Nadu politicians to Delhi to meet with the Prime Minister Narasimha Rao led Central government and stepped up pressure on the centre to bring in a Constitutional amendment to include the Tamil Nadu Act in the Ninth Schedule, ensuring that its validity cannot be challenged in any court. By the end of August 1994, the Act became a part of the Ninth Schedule by the presidential accent, confirming "the 69 percent reservation" exclusive for Tamil Nadu. The development fetched her the title of "Samooga Neethi Kaatha Veeranganai" (The leader who upheld Social justice) by K. Veeramani, General Secretary of Dravidar Kazhagam.

In 1994, Jayalalithaa government introduced a 33% reservation for women in local bodies in line with the 73rd Constitutional Amendment Act of 1992, mandating such reservation in Panchayati Raj Institutions.

=== Conflict with Chief Election Commissioner, 1994 ===
On 27 November 1994, then Chief Election Commissioner T. N. Seshan arrived in Madras, where his movement coincided with the motorcade of Chief Minister Jayalalithaa, leading to a traffic disruption and a confrontation in which his vehicle was not given priority passage. In his efforts to reform the electoral system, he drew criticism from several politicians, including Jayalalithaa, who described him as “arrogant”. The tensions were further heightened by alleged defamatory references to former Chief Ministers C. N. Annadurai and M. G. Ramachandran in "Seshan: An Intimate Story" by K. Govindan Kutty. On 29 November, Jayalalithaa escalated her criticism, accusing him of “high-handed behaviour” and insulting Tamil Nadu’s culture, and alleging misconduct towards Chief Secretary N. Haribhaskar and DGP S. Sripal, which she said led to a police lathi charge on demonstrators. After returning to New Delhi, Seshan met Prime Minister Narasimha Rao on 2 December and later President Shankar Dayal Sharma to present his account, while Jayalalithaa submitted a report accusing him of causing embarrassment to officials and hardship to the public. Meanwhile, following his “constabulary kingdom” remarks, protests by AIADMK supporters culminated in vandalism at the Taj Coromandel on 1 December. on 4 December, AIADMK Deputy General Secretary S. D. Somasundaram condemned the incident, denied party involvement, and reiterated the party’s commitment to democratic methods.

=== Tensions with the Governor (1993–1996) ===
Her tenure was also marked by a prolonged confrontation with Governor M. Chenna Reddy who succeeded Singh on 31 May 1993. Differences soon emerged between the Chief Minister Jayalalithaa and the Governor, amid perceptions within the ruling AIADMK that he had been appointed by the Narasimha Rao-led Congress(I) government at the centre to undermine her administration. Tensions reportedly began after the Governor expressed displeasure over not being promptly informed about the August 1993 bombing of the RSS headquarters in Chetpet, Chennai, which resulted in the deaths of 11 persons. At the time of the incident, Jayalalithaa was not in the city. The relations deteriorated further over a series of disputes, including the Governor’s public actions such as visiting the blast site and independently initiating relief efforts following the 1993 Latur earthquake, as well as his rejection of nominees for the Vice-Chancellor of the University of Madras.

She subsequently wrote to Prime Minister P. V. Narasimha Rao, questioning the Governor’s conduct. Reddy responded with an explanation. Her government considered legislation to make the Chief Minister the Chancellor of the university in place of the Governor. The 1993-95 period saw an exchange of public criticisms, reported delays in sanctioning funds for renovation work at Raj Bhavan, boycotts of official functions, republic day parades and customary tea parties hosted by the Governor and a resolution passed by the Assembly seeking the Governor’s recall. Then Ruling AIADMK MLAs later staged protests near Raj Bhavan. Raj Bhavan under Chenna Reddy was viewed as having become an “open house”, with the Governor reportedly courting opposition parties such as the Congress and the DMK, as well as dissidents within the AIADMK. Her government directed Speaker Sedapatti R. Muthiah to convene the Assembly without the Governor’s customary New Year address in 1994. In 1995, tensions escalated when the Governor, during a visit to Madurai Kamaraj University, summoned district officials for discussions, prompting Jayalalithaa to write letters of protest to both the Governor and the Prime Minister Rao. In March 1995, the Governor sanctioned the prosecution of Jayalalithaa in connection with the TANSI land deal and coal import cases, as sought by Subramanian Swamy. The same year, His motorcade was gheraoed by AIADMK workers at Chennai Egmore railway station and later held up for about 15 minutes in Tindivanam on 10 April 1995, while he was en route to Puducherry. Around the same time, she alleged in the Assembly that he had earlier misbehaved and used “uncouth” language during a meeting at Raj Bhavan in August 1993. However, by late 1995 the relationship showed signs of improvement. In early 1996, a more cordial atmosphere prevailed, with the Governor praising Jayalalithaa’s leadership in his Assembly address, marking a temporary easing of tensions.

== Loss of power, 1996 ==
The Jayalalithaa-led AIADMK lost power in the 1996 elections, when it won 4 of the 168 seats that they contested. Jayalalithaa was herself defeated by the DMK candidate E. G. Sugavanam in Bargur constituency, marking a rare instance of a sitting Chief Minister of the state losing an election, the first since M. Bhaktavatsalam in 1967. The outcome has been attributed to an anti-incumbency sentiment and several allegations of corruption and malfeasance against her and her ministers. DMK- TMC (M) combine came to power which also supported by Tamil Superstar Rajinikanth. The wedding event of her foster son Sudhakaran, who married a granddaughter of the Tamil film actor Shivaji Ganesan, was held on 7 September 1995 at Madras and was viewed on large screens by over 150,000 people. The event holds two Guinness World Records: one is for the most guests at a wedding and the other is for being the largest wedding banquet. Subsequently, in November 2011, Jayalalithaa told a special court than the entire ₹60 million (equivalent to ₹390 million or US$4.2 million in 2026) expenses associated with the wedding were paid by the family of the bride.

Though Sudhakaran was adopted by Jayalalithaa as her foster son in 14 June 1995, when she became aware that Sudhakaran began to interfere in her financial affairs and that he took money without intending to repay, she disowned him in 25 August 1996 within one year of adoption.

There were several corruption cases filed against her by the ruling DMK government headed by Karunanidhi. Jayalalithaa was arrested on the early morning of 7 December 1996 and was remanded to 30-day judicial custody in connection with the Colour TV scam, which charged her with receiving kickbacks to the tune of ₹101.3 million (equivalent to ₹660 million or US$7.0 million in 2026). The investigation alleged that the amount through the TV dealers were routed in the form of cheques to a relative of Sasikala, who had quoted Jayalalithaa's residence as hers. She earlier filed an anticipatory bail in the trial court, which was rejected on 7 December 1996. However, she was released from Madras Central Prison on bail on 3 January 1997 after 27 days of imprisonment. After that, she gave up the cape she had been wearing over her saree since 1990 and began appearing in simple sarees, sporting a single vertical teeka over the bindi on her forehead. She was acquitted in the case on 30 May 2000 by the trial court and the High Court upheld the order of the lower court.

Jayalalithaa expelled Sasikala from AIADMK on 27 August 1996, but after Sasikala's release from jail in July 1997, she rescinded her decision in 1 July. On 21 August 1996, rebel leaders like S. Muthusamy, S. Raja Kannapan, Arangayam expelled her from party and removed her as general secretary and later in June 1997 appointed Thirunavukkasar as general secretary. It was later challenged and won by her.

In 1998, AIADMK Silver Jubilee Conference was held at Tirunelveli by AIADMK General Jayalalithaa from 1 to 3 January. Several Alliance party leaders such as L. K. Advani, Vaiko, S. Ramadoss, Vazhappady K. Ramamurthy and Subramanian Swamy participated it ahead of Lok Sabha election that year. Her fortunes revived in the 1998 general election, (joined BJP+ on 17 December 1997) as the AIADMK became a key component of then Indian Prime Minister Atal Bihari Vajpayee's 1998–99 government; her withdrawal of support toppled it and triggered another general election just a year later. During the campaign for the 1999 Lok Sabha election, in August, Prime Minister Atal Bihari Vajpayee described dealing with Jayalalithaa for 13 months (March 1998 - April 1999) as "the most painful period" of his political career. The following day, Jayalalithaa failed to attend a joint election meeting in Viluppuram addressed by her ally Sonia Gandhi, further highlighting the strained relationship between Jayalalithaa and her political allies. Jayalalithaa also founded Jaya TV (named after her), as an AIADMK party mouthpiece in visual media in August 1999. During 1999 parliament general election, Jayalalithaa formed the alliance consisting of parties like Congress, CPI, CPI(M), INL and managed to win 13 lok sabha seats in Tamil Nadu and a lone seat in puducherry with the AIADMK winning 10 seats in Tamil Nadu.

She was also convicted in Pleasant Stay hotel case on 3 February 2000 by a trial court to one-year imprisonment.

== Second term as Chief Minister (2001) ==
Jayalalithaa strengthened the AIADMK led Secular Democratic Progressive Alliance consisting Congress, Left parties by bringing in parties like Moopanar's TMC, PMK, IUML and other smaller parties for 2001 Tamil Nadu Legislative Assembly election. Jayalalithaa was barred from standing as a candidate in the 2001 elections because she was found guilty of criminal offences, including allegedly obtaining property belonging to a state-operated agency called TANSI. Although she appealed to the Supreme Court of India, having been sentenced to five years' imprisonment, the matter was not resolved at the time of the elections. But she sought to contested from four constituencies Andipatti, Krishnagiri, Bhuvanagiri, and Pudukottai, however, all were rejected as she had been disqualified from contesting the polls at that time following conviction in the TANSI land deal case, Pleasant stay hotel case and Since one cannot file nomination for more than two constituencies. The AIADMK Alliance won the landslide victory of 196 seats in the 234-membered assembly. The AIADMK returned to power in 2001 by winning majority and she took oath as Chief Minister as a non-elected member of the state assembly on 14 May 2001.(It is noteworthy that this is the first time in Indian history that a person has taken oath as the Chief Minister of a state the day after the counting of votes has been completed.)

Noted for its ruthlessness to political opponents, many of whom were arrested in midnight raids, her government grew unpopular. In 2001, Jayalalithaa government ordered that women and Scheduled Castes be provided reservation for two consecutive terms in local bodies, after noting that the 73rd Constitutional Amendment did not specify the periodicity for the rotation of reserved seats. The decision was taken following observations that first-time representatives, particularly women, faced initial challenges due to socio-economic constraints, administrative hurdles, and political interference, which limited their ability to effectively understand governance and perform administrative functions during their initial term.

Her appointment was legally voided in September 2001 when the Supreme Court ruled that she could not hold it while convicted of criminal acts. O. Panneerselvam, a minister in her party, was subsequently installed as the Chief Minister. However, his government was purported to have been puppeted and micro-managed by Jayalalithaa.

Jayalalithaa was acquitted in both the TANSI and Pleasant Stay Hotel cases on 4 December 2001 and the Supreme Court upheld the order of the High Court on 24 November 2003. In the early hours of 6 December 2001, the Panneerselvam-led AIADMK government removed the Kannagi statue from Marina Beach after minor pedestal damage, prompting protests and claims by M. Karunanidhi that the statue, symbolising Tamil womanhood and justice, was removed on the advice of Jayalalithaa's astrologers who said it would bring misfortune and in its present form and location jeopardise her attempts to regain power, a claim denied by ministers, and it was later moved to the government museum for safekeeping.

== Third term as Chief Minister (2002–2006) ==
Upon her acquittal, she contested a bye-poll to the Andipatti constituency, which she won by a handsome margin in February 2002. Subsequently, on 2 March 2002, Jayalalithaa returned as Chief Minister once more to complete her term, having been acquitted of some charges by the Madras High Court.

Returning to power with a brute majority, Jayalalithaa made it clear that alliances were only for electoral purposes and ceased to be relevant thereafter. From 2002, she began openly attacking Sonia Gandhi, describing her as a foreigner who should not be allowed to become the Prime Minister of India. This stance was widely seen as an attempt to woo the Centre ruling BJP. She alienated the Sonia-led Congress, which had meanwhile merged with the TMC following the demise of G. K. Moopanar, as well as other AIADMK allies such as the PMK and the Left parties. These parties subsequently gravitated towards her rival and DMK President M. Karunanidhi, who withdrew from the Vajpayee-led NDA Government in December 2003, despite earlier accusations by congress party that he had facilitated the assassination of Rajiv Gandhi. On 9 May 2002, Jayalalithaa criticised the state bureaucracy in the Assembly, saying, “I admit they are lackadaisical And, like a Ringmaster in the circus, I am trying to whiplash them into action,” while responding to remarks by DMK deputy floor leader Duraimurugan that Ministers were repeating “wrong statistics” supplied by officials. Following her remarks, the State IAS Officers’ Association submitted a representation to then Tamil Nadu Chief Secretary Shankar. Soon after the row, She reshuffled the bureaucracy to “improve the efficiency of the administration”, replacing Shankar with Sukavaneshwar.

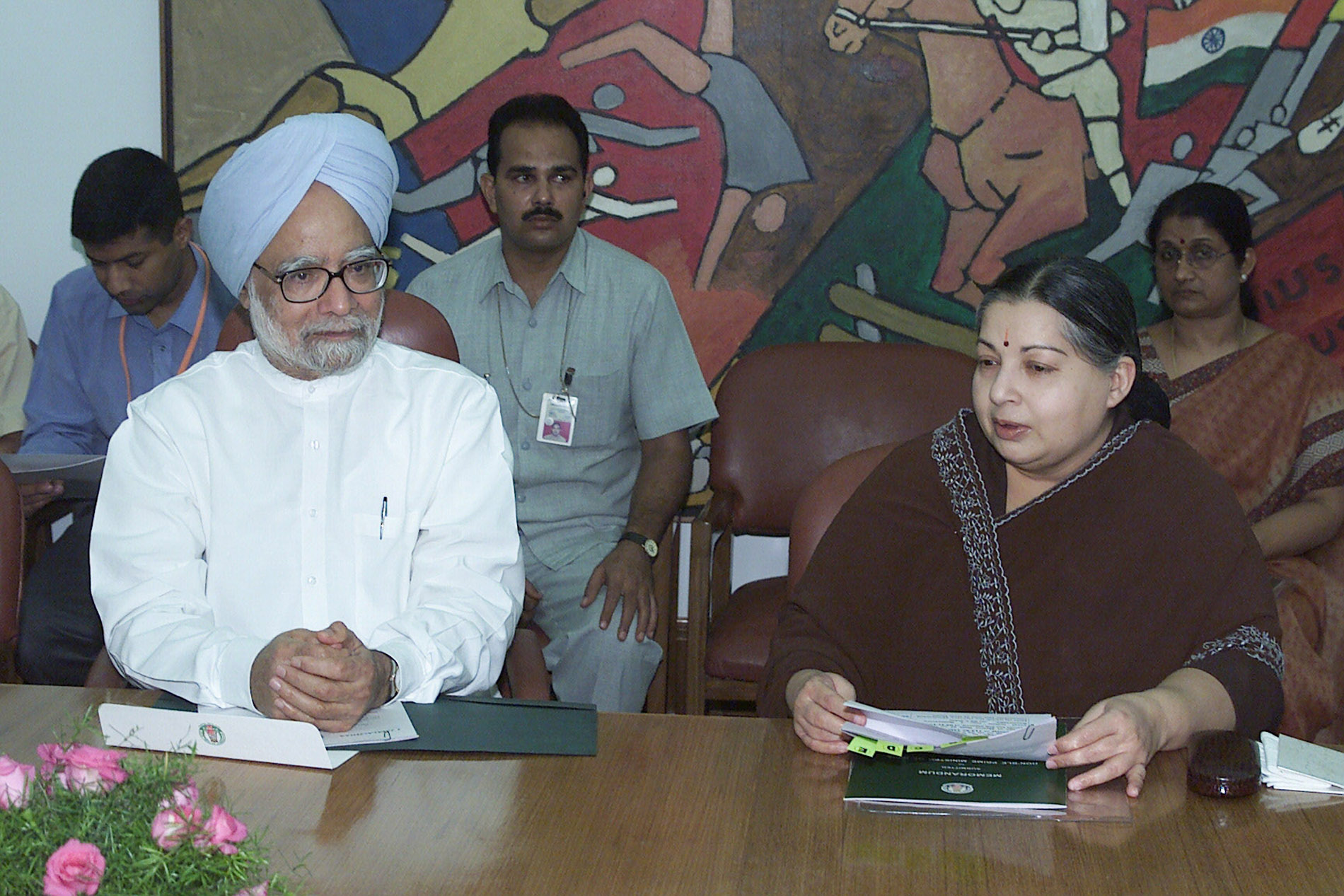
Jayalalithaa with former Prime Minister Manmohan Singh

India's first company of female police commandos was set up in Tamil Nadu in 2003. They underwent the same training as their male counterparts, covering the handling of weapons, detection and disposal of bombs, driving, horseriding, and adventure sports. The government led by her in 2003 banned sale of all lotteries, including online, within the territory of the state, despite the risk of the state losing revenue. She gave orders to a special task force headed by K. Vijaykumar to conduct a secret operation to capture and kill the bandit Veerappan by entering Karnataka. In 2004 she declared eliminating Veerappan as biggest achievement of her government and quoted ""My only brief to them was capture Veerappan dead or alive. After that I never interfered. I left them to work out their own strategies and this paid off." She began to be referred as 'People's CM' (Makallin Mudhalvar) and Iron Lady of India by end of this term. In this term she launched a rainwater harvesting scheme in 2001 to rejuvenate water sources and this improved ground water levels in the parched southern state and this idea was replicated by various states and even by the centre. On 2 February 2003, she launched the New Veeranam project to deliver water to the dry metropolis of Chennai and made it operational on 13 October 2004. Doctor Manmohan Singh frequently praised Jayalalithaa for her administrative skills, mid-day meal schemes and efforts for gender empowerment. In 2003, her government allowed parents to use their names as initials. Same year, she introduced Annadhanam scheme in religious places and donated her salary. On 31 October 2002, her Government passed the Tamil Nadu Prohibition of Forcible Conversion of Religion Act. On 13 June 2003, Jayalalithaa rebuked Pope John Paul II for raising concerns and calling the anti-conversion law "unjust" on 3 June at the Vatican, saying that as a religious leader he had no authority to comment on laws passed by democratically elected state government in this country, and that the law posed no threat to religion. But after public protests by religious minorities, Eventually Jayalalithaa revoked the law on 18 May 2004, to clear up any misconceptions. The law imposed up to four years in prison and a ₹1 lakh fine for forcibly or fraudulently converting Dalits, tribals, women, or children. Priests must report each conversion to district officials or face one year in jail. On 16 March 2003, her government withdrew the free electricity supplies to farmers and restored it in May 2004. In 2003, the Jayalalithaa-led government proposed two sites for a new State Secretariat. The first involved shifting Queen Mary's College (QMC) to Lady Willingdon Institute, and the second was a 43-acre site in Anna University meant for the National Institute of Science. Both plans were dropped due to strong protest from students and a High Court order. On 2 July 2003, Jayalalithaa's government dismissed over 1.5 lakh striking government employees and teachers by using the Essential Services Maintenance Act (ESMA), ordered midnight arrests and evicted hundreds of thousands from government housing. On 4 July 2003, during the strike, Tamil Nadu Essential Services Maintenance Act, 2002 (TESMA) was amended through an ordinance allowing the state to label any service as essential. Striking or supporting a strike under this law can lead to three years in jail, a ₹5000 fine, or both. However, At the intervention of the Madras High Court and the Supreme Court, the government later released those arrested and reinstated those sacked. On 18 May 2004, the government withdrew the cases filed against the opposition leaders in the state for allegedly instigating government employees to go on strike. On 9 August 2003, shortly before midnight, Jayalalitha government demolished Seerani Arangam on Marina Beach, a political venue built during C. N. Annadurai’s tenure, citing misuse by antisocial elements and evangelists as well as structural concerns. The move at a historic site linked to leaders like Mahatma Gandhi sparked protests. On 29 July 2003, Jayalalithaa said, “if a temple for Rama could not be built in Ayodhya, where else could it be built?”, and also backed a Uniform Civil Code (UCC), stating that the AIADMK would support such a bill in Parliament, contrary to the stand taken by her arch-rival M. Karunanidhi despite the DMK being part of then BJP-led NDA government headed by Vajpayee at the Centre. On 28 August 2003, Jayalalithaa enforced a ban on the ritual sacrifice of animals and birds in and around temples, directing district authorities to strictly implement the Tamil Nadu Ban on Animal and Bird Sacrifices Act, 1950, and take action against violators. On 20 February 2004, her government scrapped the 1950 Act, respecting the religious beliefs of those who practised such sacrifices, and lifted the ban following representations from rural people, including core voting backward and dalit communities of the AIADMK, who were upset by the ban. In the wake of the severe drubbing of the AIADMK-BJP (which joined 14/2/04) alliance, which drew a blank in all 40 seats in Tamil Nadu and Puducherry in 2004, the reversal of her earlier controversial decisions was seen as an attempt to woo alienated voters ahead of the 2006 assembly elections. In September 2004, Jayalalithaa gave a controversial interview to BBC World's HARDtalk India, hosted by Karan Thapar, at Fort St. George. At the conclusion of the tense interview, she declined to shake Thapar's hand, removed her microphone, and walked out of the room. Requests by her bureaucrats to re-record the interview were reportedly declined by the BBC team. Despite this event, She greeted Thapar warmly when they met at a National Integration Council meeting in New Delhi two years later. In October 2004, Jayalalithaa government approached the Supreme Court of India seeking to restrain the Centre from transferring Tamil Nadu Governor P. S. Ramamohan Rao. Her government alleged that the opposition DMK, then part of the ruling UPA I government, wanted the change to destabilise the ADMK led state government under Article 356 of the Constitution of India. The Court declined interim relief. Soon after, the Tamil Nadu Chief Secretary submitted excerpts of a phone conversation held on 28 October 2004, in which Union Home Minister Shivraj Patil informed Jayalalithaa that Surjit Singh Barnala would replace Rao. The disclosure sparked controversy, with Karunanidhi accusing Her of breaching secrecy. she later said she had only conveyed the gist of the conversation from memory. Rao subsequently resigned amid the controversy. In November 2004, her government arrested Jagadguru Sri Jayendra Saraswathi Mahaswamigal was arrested in connection with the Sankararaman murder case on Diwali day.

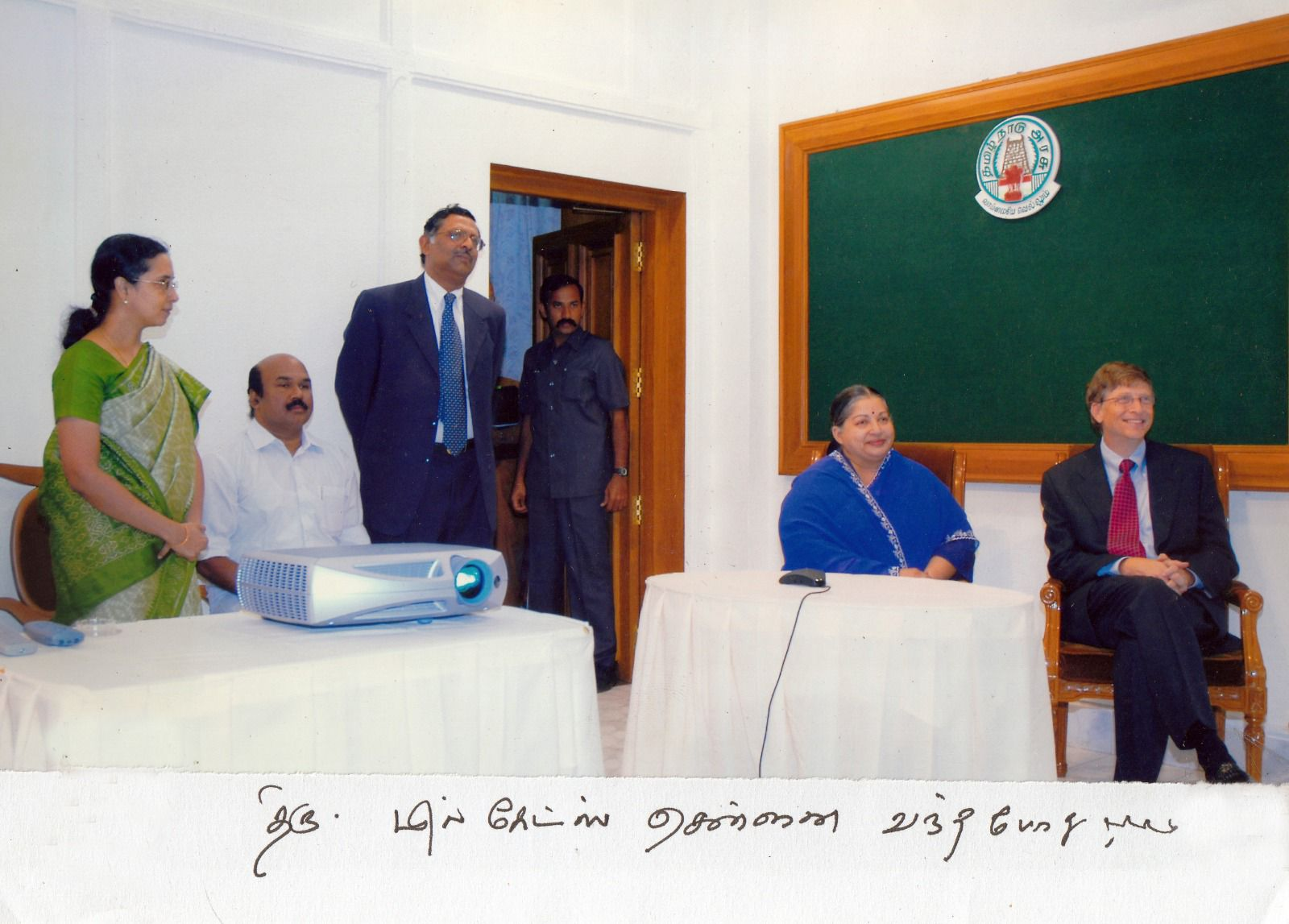
Jayalalithaa along with Bill Gates at the Secretariat on his visit to Chennai in December 2005

Her administrative abilities were notable in her handling of events following the tsunami that hit Tamil Nadu on 26 December 2004. Jayalalithaa announced a Rs 153.37 crore relief package, divided into a general package and a separate one for fishermen. She announced that affected families would get Rs 1 lakh as compensation for every member lost, along with one dhoti, one sari, two bedsheets, 60 kg of rice, three litres of kerosene, and Rs 1,000 in cash for groceries and that furthermore, Rs 1,000 was to be given for purchase of utensils, Rs 2,000 so they could put up accommodation. Per family, and there were about one lakh families in all, the package would cost about Rs 5,000. The fishermen also received an extra Rs 65 crore meant to cover gill nets and boats. It was only a matter of hours before Nagapattinam had its power supply back. With the state working on disaster management for over seven years, response time had been reduced significantly; mobile cranes and ambulances were on patrol. The government entrusted district administration with rehabilitation of affected families, and when they were found to be incompetent, she reshuffled or sacked officers immediately. Jayalalithaa even extended help to the Sri Lankan government by instating officers to guide the island nation in the process of rehabilitation. When Hindi actor Vivek Oberoi volunteered to rehabilitate the tsunami-hit coastal fishing village of Devanampattinam in Cuddalore district but later withdrew from the project on 3 April 2005, on the next day, Jayalalithaa criticized his involvement as a publicity stunt and accused him of doing little beyond taking credit for relief and rehabilitation measures carried out by her government.

On 11 May 2006, Jayalalithaa resigned as the chief minister of Tamil Nadu following her party's defeat in the assembly elections.

== Leader of the Opposition (2006–2011) ==
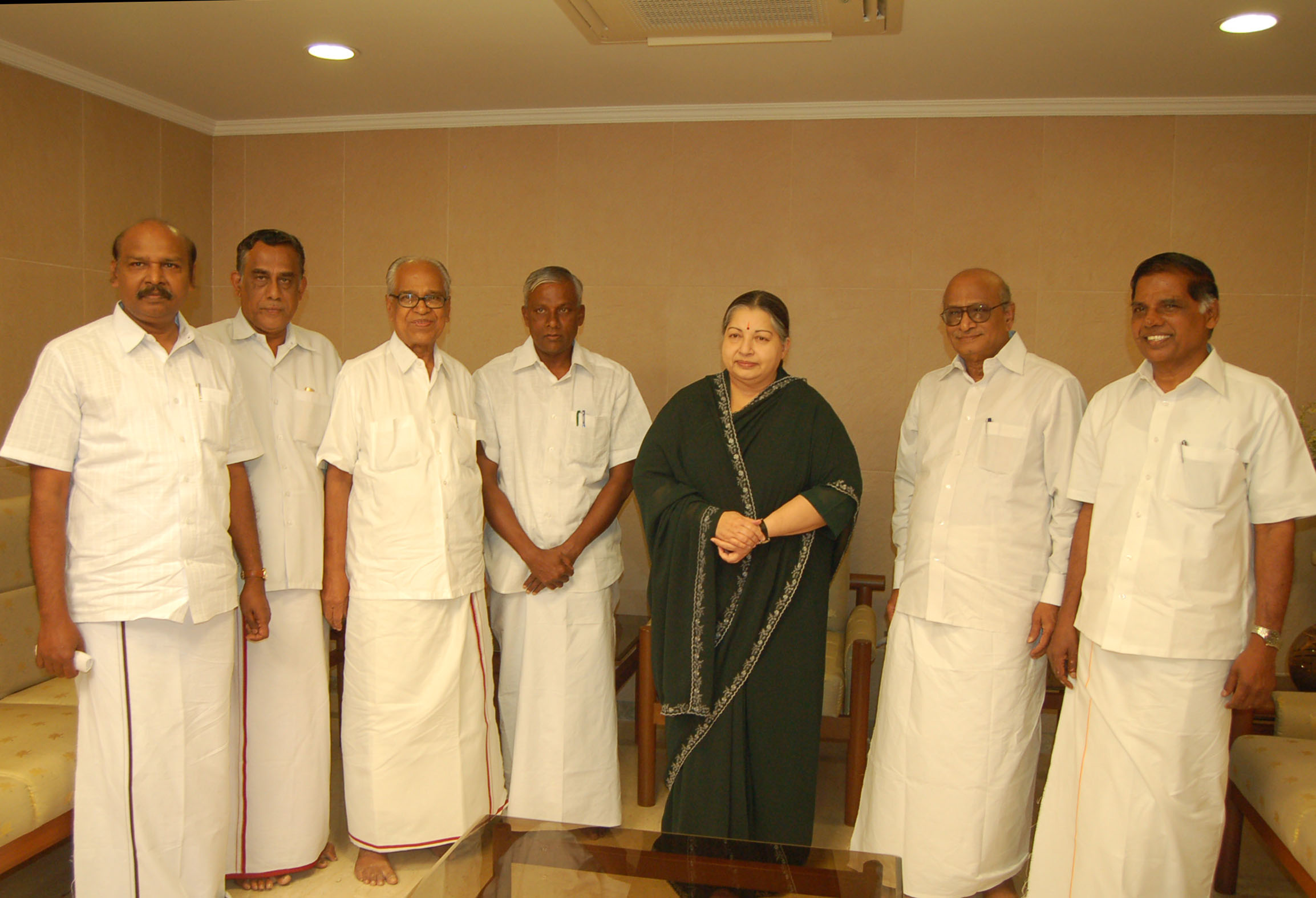
Jayalalithaa with the leaders of CPI(M) Party

AIADMK fared poorly in May 2006 Tamil Nadu Legislative Assembly election, with her party winning just 61 seats out of total 234 in the state elections in 2006. She won in Andipatti. Though her main opposition, DMK did not win a single party majority (96/234), DMK coalition had 162/234 seats and formed the cabinet until 2011 which she referred to as "Minority DMK government". For the first time, the AIADMK secured 7 of the 14 seats in the DMK stronghold of Chennai City alone in an election widely regarded as lacking a clear wave. By forming an alliance with the MDMK and VCK, she narrowed the margin between ADMK front and the DMK alliance, which polled around 45% of the vote, despite the latter beginning with a notional arithmetic advantage of nearly 55%.

On 29 May 2006, Jayalalithaa was unanimously elected as Leader of the Opposition by AIADMK MLAs replacing O. Panneerselvam soon after two days, she single-handedly took on the ruling DMK in the house in the wake of the suspension of all 60 AIADMK legislators for the entire session. During 2009 parliament general election, The AIADMK-led alliance consisting of parties like PMK, CPI, CPI(M), MDMK managed to win 12 seats with the AIADMK winning 9 seats.

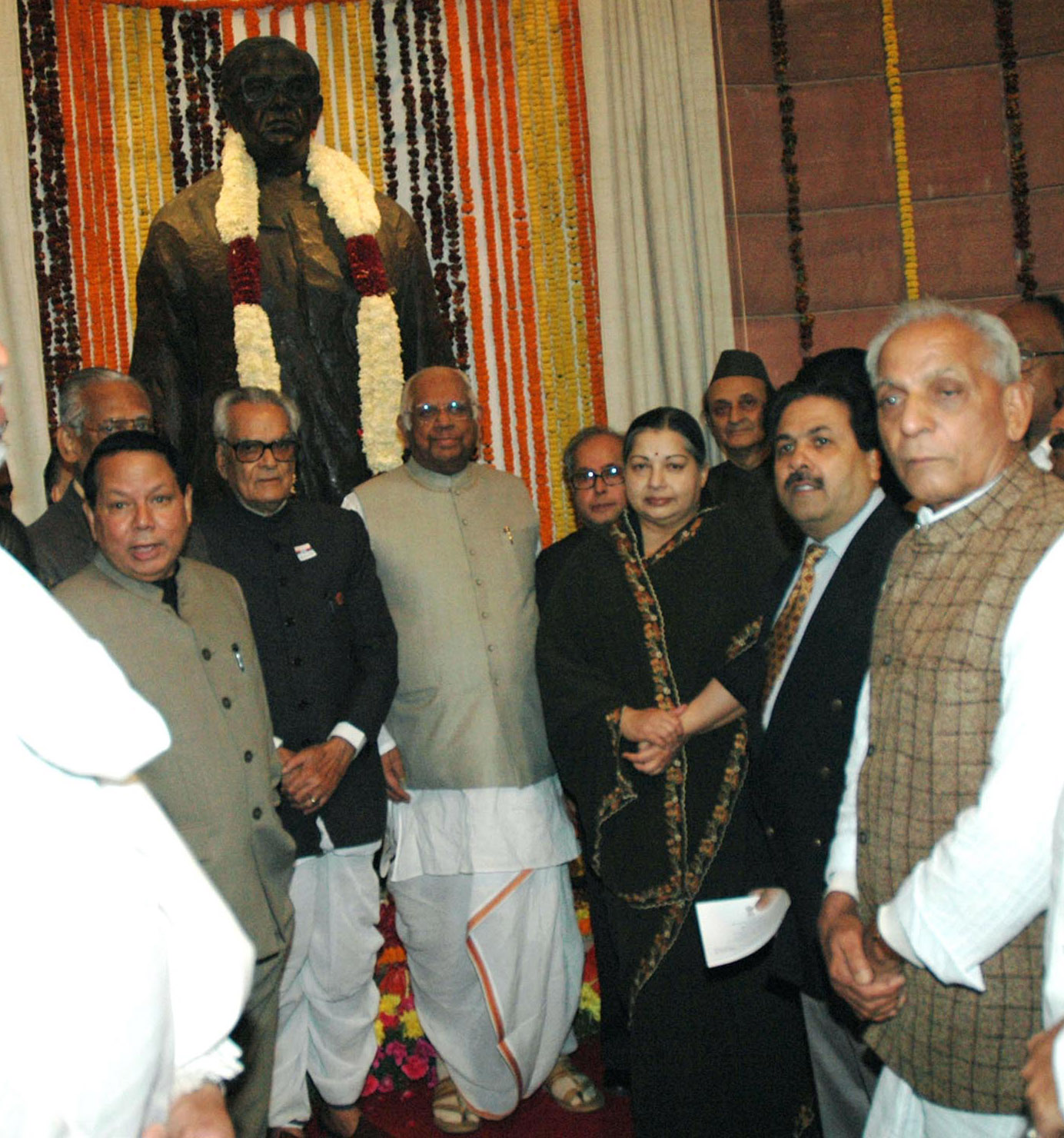
Jayalalithaa along with other leaders at the unveiling ceremony of Bhupesh Gupta Statue in New Delhi

In a telephonic interview to Times Now in November 2010, Jayalalithaa offered unconditional support to Prime Minister Manmohan Singh’s UPA II government, stating that her sole objective was to restore probity in public life. She said the AIADMK with its nine MPs in the Lok Sabha, could mobilise the support of 18 MPs with like-minded parties to offset the DMK if it withdrew its backing over the 2G spectrum scam. However, the Congress rejected the offer, affirming the DMK as a key partner in the UPA. This move was in line with her earlier attempts to woo the Congress ahead of the Lok Sabha polls. Despite several Congress MPs and the party’s Tamil Nadu unit favouring an alliance with the AIADMK, the Congress high command chose to stick with the DMK in 2009 as well.

Rivalry with Vijayakanth

Following the early electoral performances of then newly founded DMDK led by Vijayakanth, who was perceived as a political rival attempting to erode the AIADMK’s influence, styled himself as “Karuppu MGR” (Black MGR) and used a blue campaign van reportedly gifted by V. N. Janaki, the widow of M. G. Ramachandran, and emerged as the sole DMDK MLA after winning the Virudhachalam Assembly constituency in the 2006 Tamil Nadu Legislative Assembly election.Its subsequent performance in the Madurai Central by-election, where it finished third closely behind the opposition AIADMK, and in later local body elections further enhanced its visibility, particularly among younger voters and sections of the AIADMK’s support base. Viewing the DMDK’s rise as detrimental to the AIADMK, Jayalalithaa criticized the DMDK leader Vijayakanth without naming him explicitly in October 2006 to assert MGR's legacy. Referring to his then electoral promises such as eradicating corruption and providing door-to-door ration supplies, she described them as the “blabbering of some under the influence of liquor,” adding, “Those who consume liquor every day have no right to utter the name of MGR. The concerned people know whom I am referring to.” These remarks led to sharp exchanges between the two leaders.

Despite being an actress-turned-politician herself, when Chiranjeevi entered politics in August 2008, Jayalalithaa remarked that “Tamil Nadu’s disease seems to have infected Andhra Pradesh,” a comment interpreted as criticism of the increasing trend of film actors entering political life. In October 2008, Jayalalithaa reportedly stayed away from a fast organized by her Allies and Left parties on the Sri Lankan Tamil issue, despite assuring participation through the party representatives. Her absence was attributed to her reluctance to share the stage with Vijayakanth.

Sri Lankan Tamil Issue

In August 2008, Jayalalithaa moved the Supreme Court to nullify the Katchatheevu agreements of 1974 and 1976. She had raised the retrieval of the islet in her maiden Independence Day address in August 1991. In 1991, Jayalalithaa led Tamil Nadu Assembly adopted a resolution demanding the retrieval of Katchatheevu. During the civil war and with northern borders under the control of the LTTE, the fishermen had easy access to the fishing grounds.

Jayalalithaa undertook a day-long fast in March 2009, a couple of months before the Parliamentary elections demanding an immediate ceasefire. She accused then Chief Minister Karunanidhi led DMK government in the State and the UPA government at the Centre of "criminal neglect in failing to provide relief and succour to the Sri Lankan Tamils".

In April 2009, LTTE Chief Prabhakaran thanked Jayalalithaa for voicing her support in favour of Tamil Eelam through a secret letter. It was later revealed by AIADMK MP Maitreyan.

After she returned to power in May 2011, the Assembly had adopted several resolutions, seeking an international probe into the alleged war crimes and genocide in the final phase of the Sri Lankan Civil War. She also demanded an economic embargo on Sri Lanka. She expressed her opposition not only to the presence of Sri Lankan military personnel receiving training anywhere in India but also to that of Sri Lankan sportspersons.

As for Sri Lankan Tamil refugees living in Tamil Nadu, she had changed her position. Originally, she justified the refugees taking shelter in the State "as long as the genocide continues" in the Sri Lanka. But, after the Assassination of Rajiv Gandhi in 1991, she had branded the refugee camps as "breeding grounds" for LTTE militants. However, she turned sympathetic again to the refugees in 2011. She not only enhanced allowance for them but also announced a special scheme for building "durable houses" for rehabilitation.

Crossing 60, Against Family History

“My father died at the age of 42, my mother at 47 and my brother at 49. But, I've crossed 59 and entered 60. It is all due to the blessings of my mother, Sandhya, and political mentor MGR and the love bestowed by you all (party cadres).”

— Jayalalithaa, during the speech at a wedding ceremony organized by the AIADMK for 60 couples to mark her 60th birthday., Sunday, 24 February 2008

Association with Cho Ramaswamy

Jayalalithaa shared a long-standing friendship with Thuglak founder Cho Ramaswamy, dating back to their early film careers. Cho closely followed her political rise and was regarded as an informal advisor during key periods, including the formation of alliances ahead of the 2001 and 2011 Tamil Nadu Assembly elections, involving leaders such as G. K. Moopanar and Vijayakanth, though he publicly distanced himself from such a label. On his advice, she allied with the BJP in 2004 Loksabha election, and later, in 2009, he urged her to join a Third Front comprising Left parties, by avoiding a pre-poll alliance with BJP to improve electoral prospects in Tamil Nadu. Their relationship saw phases of strain, notably in 1996 when Jayalalithaa openly declared that Cho should stop claiming he was her friend, as Cho supported the DMK-TMC alliance and in 1998 Lok sabha elections when he advised the BJP against aligning with her, before reconciling by 2001. Differences also emerged over issues such as her stance on Sri Lankan Tamils. In August 2015, She visited to Cho during his illness reflected their enduring personal bond. Their association weakened again after criticism of her government at a 2016 Thuglak event in January, and they did not fully reconcile.

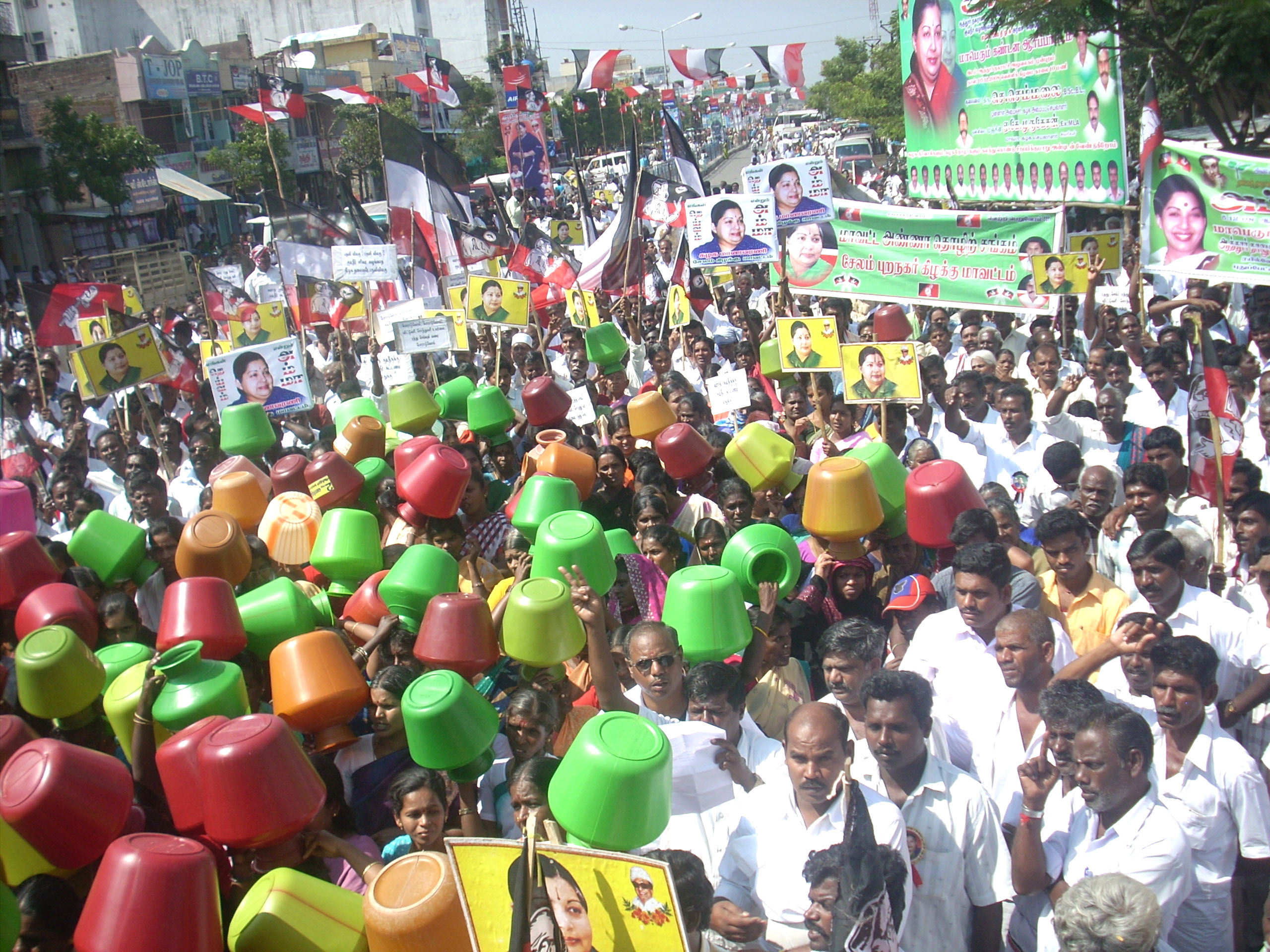
AIADMK party protest as an opposition

Protest Rallies

In late 2010, Jayalalithaa as an opposition leader held three big rallies to protest against the price rise and policies of UPA Government at the Centre and DMK Government in the State. The public meetings took place at Coimbatore on 13 July, Trichy on 14 August and Madurai on 18 October. These rallies drew lakhs of people, were seen as the shows of strength by the AIADMK ahead of 2011 Assembly Election.

== Fourth term as Chief Minister (2011–2014) ==
Jayalalithaa was sworn in as chief minister for the fourth time after the AIADMK swept the 2011 assembly election in a landslide. She won in Srirangam. Her government received attention for its extensive social-welfare agenda, which included several subsidised "Amma"-branded goods such as (Amma canteens, Amma bottled water, Amma salt, Amma medical shops, Amma cement and Amma baby care kit).

In April 2011, the AIADMK was part of a 13-party alliance (notably with Actor VijayaKant's DMDK) that won 203 out of 234 Seats in the 14th state assembly elections (actor Vijay also supported her). Jayalalithaa was sworn in as the chief minister of Tamil Nadu for the fourth time on 16 May 2011, having been elected unanimously as the leader of the AIADMK party subsequent to those elections. This was the first time that AIADMK and its allies won 14 of 16 seats in Capital city Chennai. On the evening of 16 May, following her swearing-in, Jayalalithaa assumed office as Chief Minister at the Secretariat. When approached by the media there, she stated that she would meet the press once a week and subsequently established a liaison office for this purpose. However, she did not adhere to this commitment and remained largely inaccessible to the media thereafter, according to journalists.

Former US Secretary of State Hillary Clinton met Jayalalithaa at Chief Secretariat of Tamil Nadu

On 19 December 2011, Jayalalithaa expelled her long-time close friend V. K. Sasikala and 13 others from the AIADMK after she became aware that Sasikala and her family were working against her. Most of the party members welcomed her decision. The matter was resolved by 31 March when Sasikala was reinstated as a party member after issuing a written apology. Sasikala in her written apology mentioned that she had no ambitions either in the party or in the government and wanted to serve Jayalalithaa and added that she became aware of misdeeds done by her family members when Jayalalithaa was in power. Only after Sasikala promised to be not in touch with her family members, Jayalalithaa allowed Sasikala back to her house. Sasikala later proclaimed this as "drama".

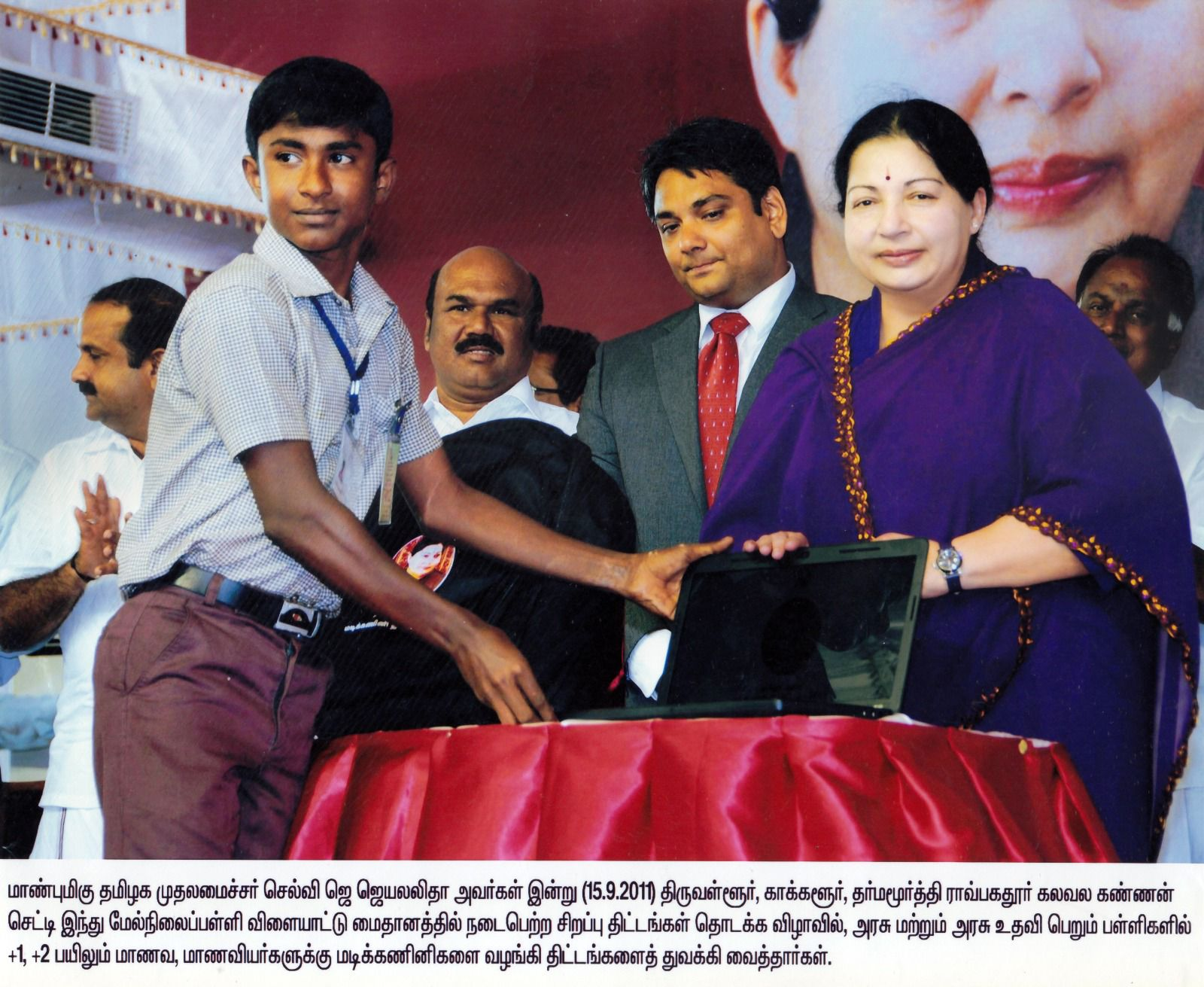
Jayalalithaa inaugurates free laptops scheme to students in September 2011

In this term, she announced the Pension Scheme for Destitute Transgender by which those above ages of 40 could get a monthly pension of Rs. 1,000. Her government ensured members of the transgender community could enrol for education and job. Beginning from 2011, every year her government gave free laptops to students who clear tenth and twelfth standard to impart digital education to rural areas. Her government in 2011 decided to give four goats and a cow to each family below poverty line – mixer and grinders and fans for households, 3 sets of free uniforms, school, bags, notebooks, geometry boxes for all children in government schools, and cycles and laptops for Class 11 and 12 students. In 2011 she launched the marriage assistance scheme wherein the female students received 4 gram gold free for use as Thirumangalyam for their marriage and cash assistance up to Rs. 50,000 for undergraduate or diploma holding females. There were rampant power cut issues between 2006 and 2011 while AIADMK was in opposition wherein for 10 to 15 hours there was no supply of electricity. However, after she regained power, between 2011 and 2015, her state government corrected all the discrepancies of previous DMK regime such that the Central Electricity Authority in 2016 said the state is expected to have 11,649 million units of surplus power. Tamil Nadu became among the power surplus states while she was chief minister in this term. In this term her government ensured the wrongfully usurped property by land grabbing during 2006 to 2011 in the previous DMK regime, had been retrieved and handed over to rightful owners between 2011 and 2015.

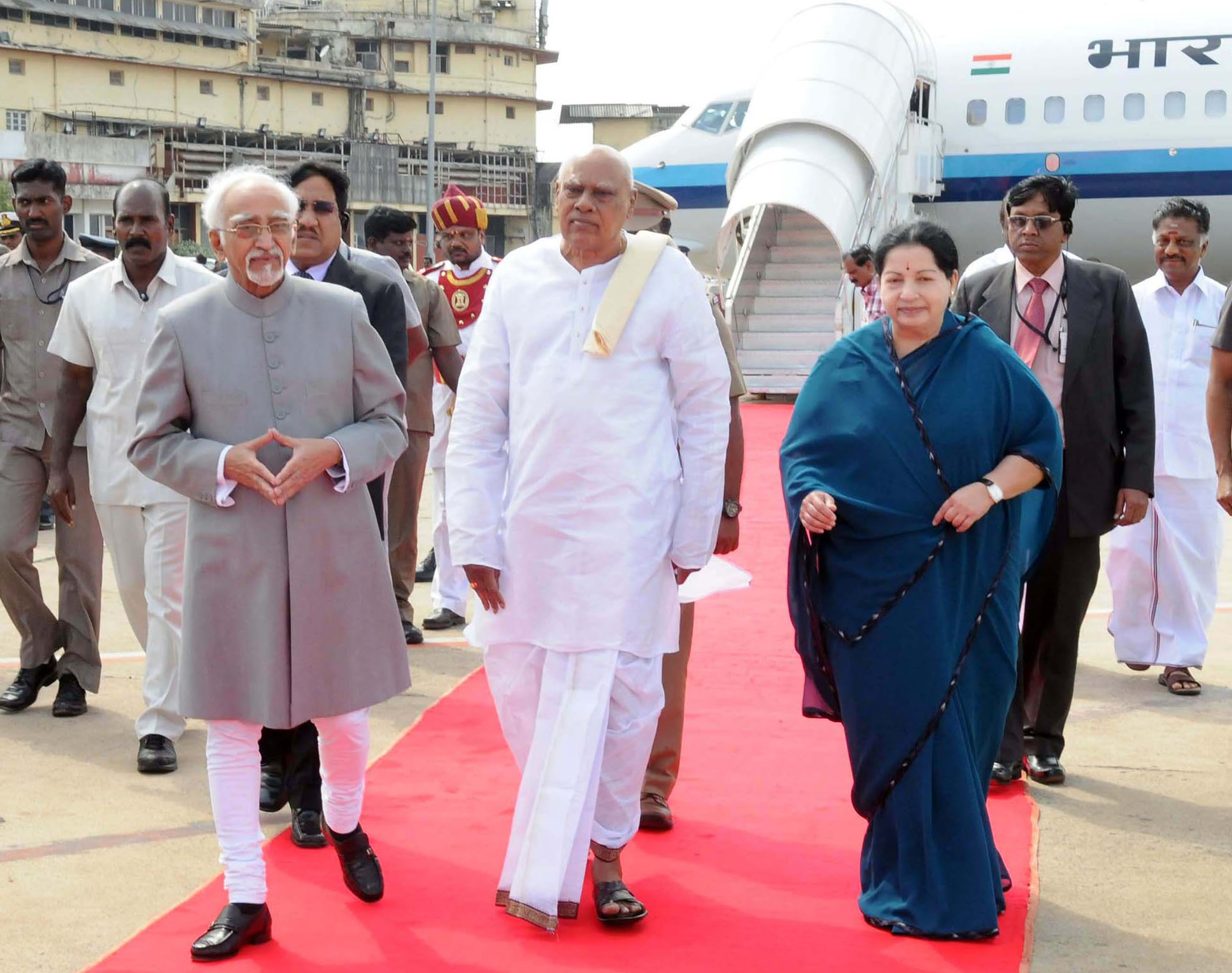
Former Vice-president Hamid Ansari being received by Jayalalithaa at Chennai International Airport

She announced in 2012, the Vision 2023 document which embodied a strategic plan for infrastructure development which included raising the per capita income of residents to $10,000 per annum, matching Human Development Index to that of developed countries by 2023, providing high-quality infrastructure all over the State, making Tamil Nadu the knowledge capital and innovation hub of India. This project had three components – Overall Vision Document, Compilation of Project Profile and Road Map. The work on this continued under her supervision until her death. She inaugurated 'Amma health insurance scheme' in 2012.

In February 2012, relations between Jayalalithaa and then Opposition Leader Vijayakanth deteriorated following a heated confrontation in the Tamil Nadu Assembly, leading to the AIADMK snapping ties with the DMDK. Jayalalithaa described Vijayakanth’s conduct as “disgusting and crude” and remarked that his behaviour exemplified the consequences of “undeserving persons” rising to high office. She also stated that she had agreed to the alliance only to satisfy party cadre and later regretted and felt ashamed of partnering with the DMDK, predicting its political decline.

=== Amma Branded Schemes ===
In February 2013, Jayalalithaa Government inaugurated the state-run Subsidised food programme called Amma Unavagam (Amma Canteen), which was later praised by economist and Nobel laureate Amartya Sen in his book An Uncertain Glory – India and its Contradictions and inspired by many states in India. The Scheme was also lauded by Egypt in 2014. Under the scheme, municipal corporations of the state-run canteens serving subsidised food at low prices. which was followed by the plenty of populist schemes such as Amma Kudineer (bottled mineral water), 'Amma' Salt, 'Amma' Medical Shops, and 'Amma' Cement.

In 2015, she also launched 'Amma baby care kit' scheme where every mother who gave birth in the government hospital gets 16 types of products.

=== Verdicts on Tamil Nadu water rows ===
Jayalalithaa had initiated a case in the Supreme Court to uphold the state's rights on Mullaperiyar Dam issue in 2006. As a result, In May 2014, Supreme court verdict allowed the Tamil Nadu State to increase the storage level in the Mullaperiyar Dam to 142 feet from 136 ft and struck down the unconstitutional law enacted by the Kerala Government in 2006 restricting the storage level to 136 ft. This Supreme Court Verdict sustained the livelihood of the farmers and people in the southern districts of Tamil Nadu.

In February 2013, the Union Government notified the final award of Cauvery Water Disputes Tribunal (CWDT) on the directions of the Supreme Court. Then Chief Minister Jayalalithaa termed it as a "tremendous achievement" of her government after 22 long years of legal battle, the State had got Due justice. Then Jayalalithaa said that it was the happiest day of her life and the happiest day for the farmers in Tamil Nadu, she recalled her famous fast-unto-death at Marina beach in 1993.

=== Thevar Outreach ===
On 9 February 2014, the 13-kg gold armour was donated by then Chief Minister of Tamil Nadu Jayalalithaa for adorning the 3.5-feet-tall statue of Pasumpon Muthuramalinga Thevar at Pasumpon in Ramanathapuram district to woo Thevars, an influential OBC community in south Tamil Nadu. ahead of 2014 general election. Thevar Community is seen as the traditional vote bank of the AIADMK party in the southern Tamil Nadu since its inception. The gold armour is estimated to be worth Rs 4 crore. The armour is kept in a nationalised bank locker in madurai. After AIADMK party treasurer and the trustee of the memorial signing in the bank, The Golden Armour would be taken out and handed over to the incharge of the memorial every year between 28 and 30 October observe Thevar Jayanthi.

=== 2014 Lok Sabha election ===
During 2014 Indian general election, she was seen as potential candidate for prime minister. Mamata Banerjee also said she will support her if she becomes prime minister. Jayalalithaa solely won 37 seats out of 40 seats in Tamil Nadu and Pondicherry.

=== General Secretary of AIADMK ===
On 29 August 2014, Jayalalithaa was re-elected as the General Secretary of the All India Anna Dravida Munnetra Kazhagam for the 7th Consecutive term, Making her the longest serving general secretary of the party till date. Earlier, she was elected in the years of 1988, 1989, 1993, 1998, 2003, 2008 and 2014.

== Disproportionate assets case (2014) ==
Movable Properties in Disproportionate Assets
Particulars	Numbers
Sarees	11,344
Decorated footwears	750
Shawls	250
Dressing tables	9
Wrist watches	91
Suitcases	131
Teapoys	34
Tables	31
Cots	24
Sofa Sets	20
Dressing Mirrors	31
Telephones/Intercoms	33
Wall Clocks	27
Fans	86
Decorated Chairs	146
Hanging Lights	81
Crystal Cut Glasses	215
Refrigerators	12
Television Sets	10
VCRs	8
Video Camera	1
CD Players	4
Audio Decks	2
Two-in-One Tape Recorders	24
Video Cassettes	1,040
Cash	193,202

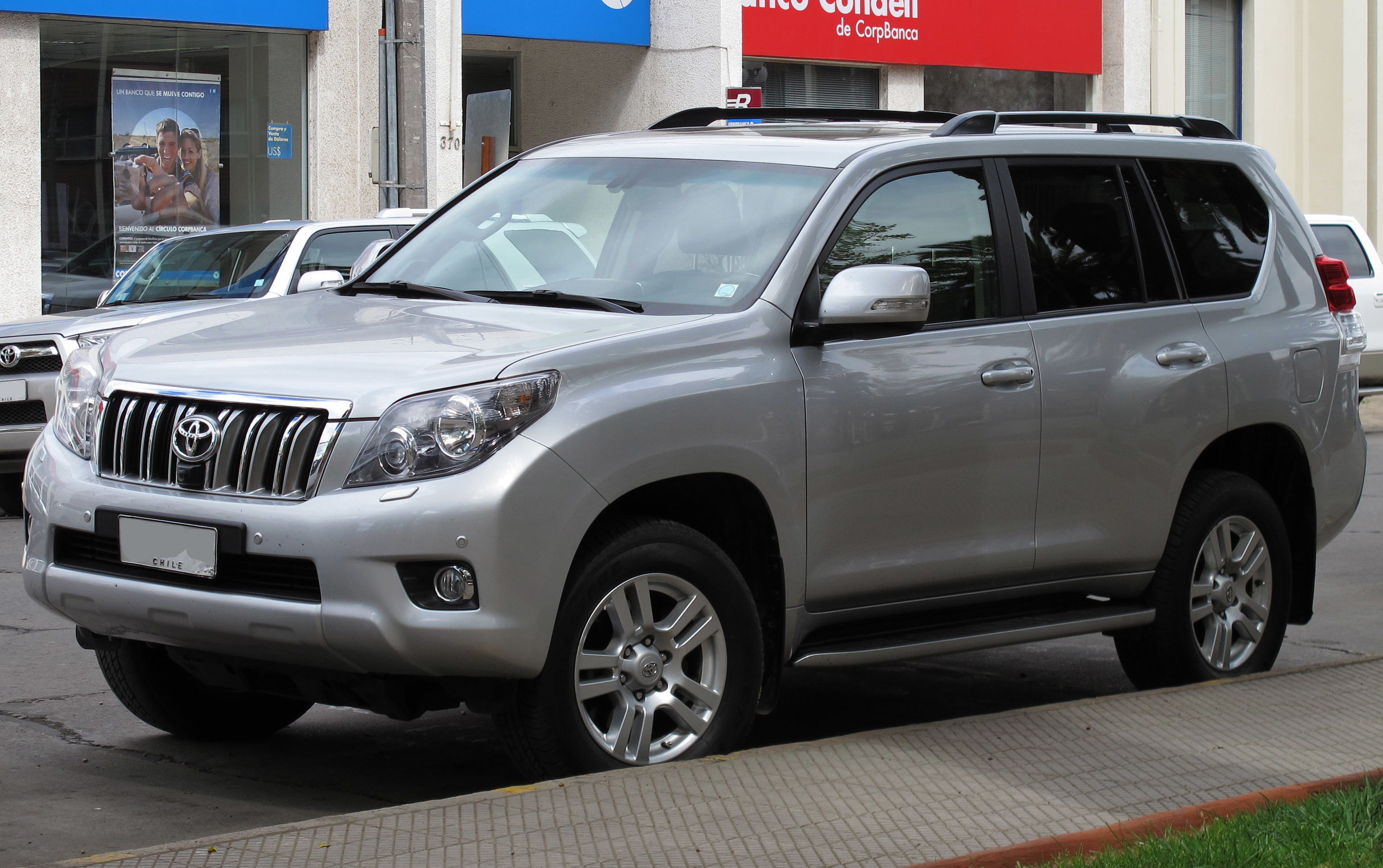
Jayalalithaa's car Toyota Land Cruiser Prado

Three years into her tenure, she was convicted in a disproportionate-assets case, rendering her disqualified to hold office.

On 27 September 2014, Jayalalithaa was sentenced to four years in jail and fined ₹1 billion (equivalent to ₹1.7 billion or US$19 million in 2026) by the Special Court in Bengaluru. She was convicted in an 18-year-old disproportionate assets case that was launched by Janata Party President Subramanian Swamy (now a member of Bharatiya Janata Party) on 20 August 1996 on the basis of an Income Tax Department report on her. Jayalalithaa's close associate Sasikala, her niece Ilavarasi, her nephew and the chief minister's disowned foster son Sudhakaran were also convicted. They were sentenced to four years in jail and fined ₹100 million (equivalent to ₹170 million or US$1.9 million in 2026) each. Special Judge John Michael D'Cunha convicted her to owning assets to the tune of ₹666.5 million (equivalent to ₹4.0 billion or US$42 million in 2026) (which includes 2,000 acres (810 ha) of land, 30 kilograms (66 lb) of gold and 12,000 saris) disproportionate to her known sources of income during 1991–96 when she was chief minister for the first time. The verdict was delivered by a makeshift court in the Parappana Agrahara prison complex in the presence of Jayalalithaa and the other accused.

She was automatically disqualified from the post of chief minister and the legislative assembly of Tamil Nadu, and thus became the first sitting Indian chief minister to be disqualified. O. Panneerselvam, a minister and her loyalist in her party, succeeded her as the Chief Minister on 29 September 2014. Initially, a Karnataka High Court Judge denied her bail. On 17 October 2014, the Supreme Court granted her two months' bail and suspended her sentence. On 18 October 2014, Jayalalithaa returned to Chennai after spending 21 days in Bangalore jail. Despite heavy rain that day, AIADMK cadres assembled outside her residence and welcomed her.

On 11 May 2015, a special Bench of the Karnataka High Court (judge C. R. Kumaraswamy) set aside her conviction on appeal. That court acquitted her and the alleged associates—Sasikala, her niece Ilavarasi, her nephew and Jayalalithaa's disowned foster son Sudhakaran.

On 14 February 2017 (subsequent to her death) the Supreme Court of India over-ruled the Karnataka High Court. Sasikala and the other accused were convicted and sentenced to four years of imprisonment, as well as being fined 100 million each. The case against Jayalalithaa was abated because she had died and hence cannot defend herself.

== Fifth term as Chief Minister (2015–2016) ==
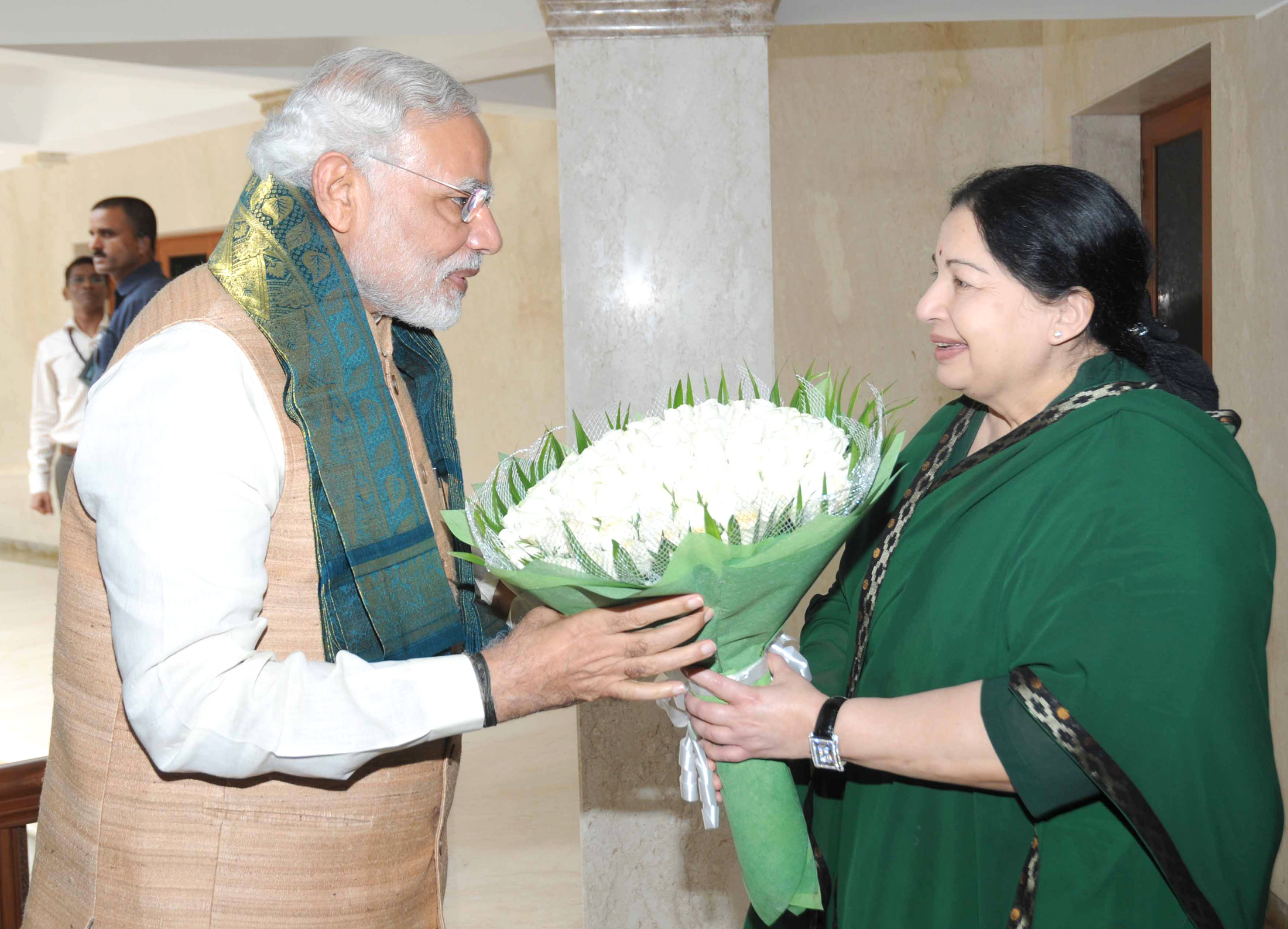
Jayalalithaa welcoming Prime Minister Narendra Modi at her residence in 2015.

The acquittal allowed her once again to hold office and on 23 May 2015, Jayalalithaa was sworn in as Chief Minister of Tamil Nadu for the fifth time. She was subsequently re-elected by the electorate of the Radhakrishnan Nagar of North Chennai in the by-election held on 27 June 2015. In a landslide victory, she polled more than 88 per cent votes of the 74.4 per cent turnout, winning by a margin of over 150,000 votes after the sitting MLA P. Vetrivel resigned for the seat, gave up his membership.

In 2015, she introduced Amma Master Health checkup plan where in people could get various treatments done at a low fee in government hospitals and rolled out Amma Arogya plan wherein at primary health care centre in Tamil Nadu, certain tests can be done by public twice a week. This was done to help the sections of society who cannot afford the fares asked for by private hospital. Later in February 2016 she started the free bus ride scheme for senior citizens above age of 60 wherein person could travel free of cost for 10 times a month. Her government initiated Global Investors Summit in 2015 which saw over Rs 2.43 lakh crore worth of investments being committed to the state. Jayalalithaa's term, all of them together, saw some big-ticket investments in the state and over $20 billion FDI. The department of industrial policy and promotion data disclosed that Tamil Nadu saw foreign direct investment inflows of $7.3 billion from April 2000 to March 2011; however, this went up to $13.94 billion from April 2011 to December 2015, under her government, which at as per conversion rate as of 2016 equals Rs 837.66 billion. Between April 2015 and December 2015, the State attracted $4.3 billion in FDI.

In June 2015, Pakistani news channels Samaa TV and Geo News aired a news and applauded Jayalalithaa for her government's scheme which was introduced in 2013, of supplying free rice to mosques during Ramzan and suggested the scheme should be implemented in Pakistan too.

Emotional speech

"AIADMK is the true people's movement; one that has dedicated itself for the people, with a leader (herself) who has dedicated for the people. Even after my time, for many centuries, AIADMK will work only for people."

— J. Jayalalithaa, Chief Minister's Reply to motion of thanks on the Governor's last address of the 14th Assembly, Saturday, 23 January 2016

On 20 February 2016, Jayalalithaa led AIADMK Government passed the Tamil Nadu Municipal Laws (Amendment) Act, 2016, and the Tamil Nadu Panchayats (Amendment) Act, 2016 in Tamil Nadu Assembly, enhancing the reservation for women from 33 per cent to 50 per cent in local bodies such as corporations, municipalities, town panchayats and village panchayats in the state.

== Sixth term as Chief Minister (2016) ==
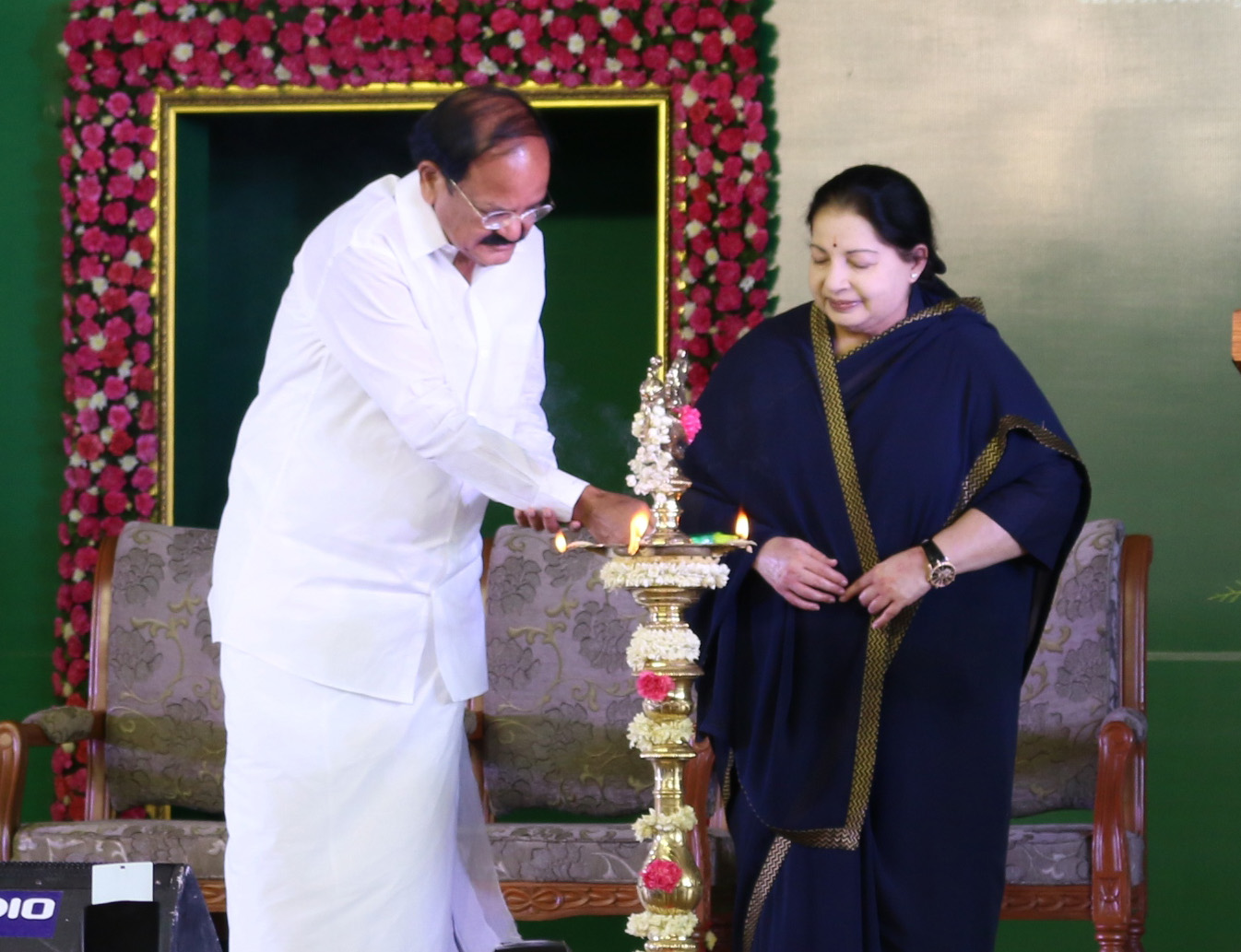
Jayalalithaa with former Vice-president (then Union minister) Venkaiah Naidu in foundation stone laying ceremony

In the 2016 assembly election, she became the first Tamil Nadu chief minister since M.G.R. in 1984 to be voted back into power. That September, she fell severely ill and, following 75 days of hospitalisation, died on 5 December 2016 due to cardiac arrest.

On that Election, Jayalalithaa's Campaign Slogan was "I'm of the people, and I'm for the people." (மக்களால் நான், மக்களுக்காகவே நான்.) Jayalalithaa was again elected as Chief Minister of Tamil Nadu in the May 2016 elections. She retained the Radhakrishnan Nagar Assembly constituency with a margin of 39,545 votes over her DMK rival. She became the first leader in Tamil Nadu to serve consecutive terms as Chief Minister since the death of M.G.R. in 1987. In her victory speech, she commented, "Even when 10 parties allied themselves against me, I did not have a coalition and I placed my faith in God and built an alliance with the people. It is clear that the people have faith in me and I have total faith in the people." Jayalalithaa appeared on the cover of India Today magazine ten times during her lifetime.

Her government within 100 days of resuming power in May 2016, wrote off the outstanding crop loans given by cooperative banks to over 16.94 lakh farmers, gave free power to households to extent of first 100 units and gave free power to handloom weavers to extent of 200 units, gave 750 units of power to power loom weavers, implemented closure of 500 liquor shops and reduction of working hours of liquor outlets emergence of power surplus states. The establishment of first 1,000 MW nuclear power plant at Kudankulam is also regarded as one of her achievements. She increased the freedom fighters monthly pension to Rs 12,000, family pension and increased special pension to Rs 6,000. The last Tamil Nadu Assembly session Chief Minister Jayalalithaa attended was on 2 September 2016, after which the Assembly was adjourned sine die. The session had been held from 1 August for the demands for grants and earlier from 25 to 27 July for the Revised Budget 2016–17. On 21 September 2016 she inaugurated two Chennai Metro rail lines by way of video conferencing. This was her last public appearance before being admitted to hospital on 22 September 2016.

== Controversies ==
=== Personality cult ===
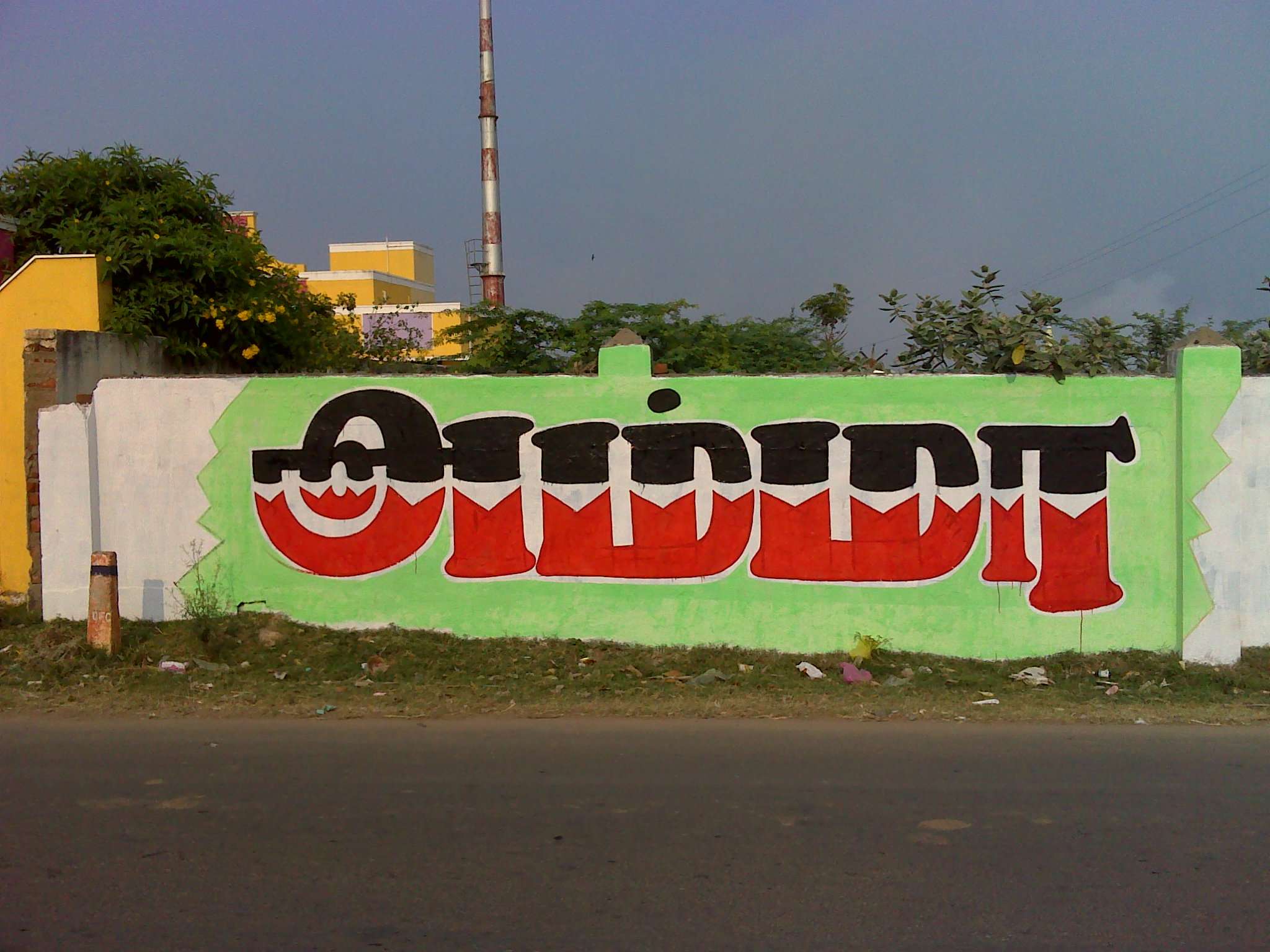
“Amma”, a popular nickname of Jayalalithaa, depicted in an AIADMK party wall painting

Followers of Jayalalithaa often worshiped her as a divine being. She stimulated a cult following, and adoring supporters often termed her "Adi Parashakti" (the eternal mighty goddess). Several experts say that over the years the cult called 'Amma' has been carefully crafted. Others claim that the emotional outburst is just a spontaneous display of loyalist support. C Lakshmanan of the Madras Development Institute studies, who has studied personality cult in the politics of Tamil Nadu, said posters were installed around the state portraying Jayalalithaa as a goddess back then. She was worshiped by the party cadre as "Amma" (Mother). On Christmas morning in 1994, while addressing a special prayer service at the Santhome Cathedral Basilica in Mylapore, a controversy arose regarding the location from which she delivered her speech, in the presence of and at the invitation of the Madras–Mylapore Archbishop. Critics, including M. Karunanidhi, alleged that she had spoken from inside the pulpit. However, then Intelligence Inspector General A. X. Alexander stated that she had in fact spoken from outside, standing in front of it.

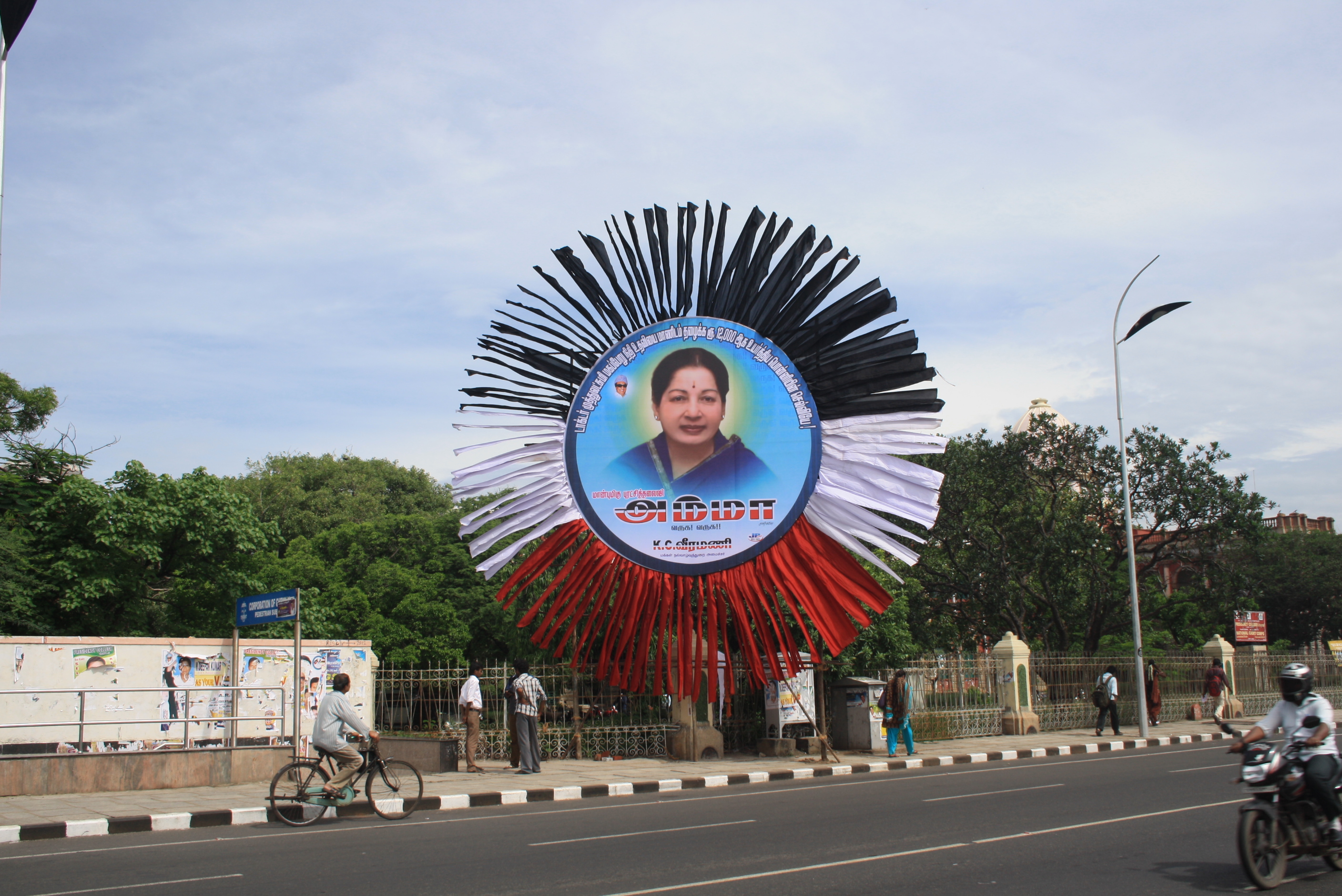
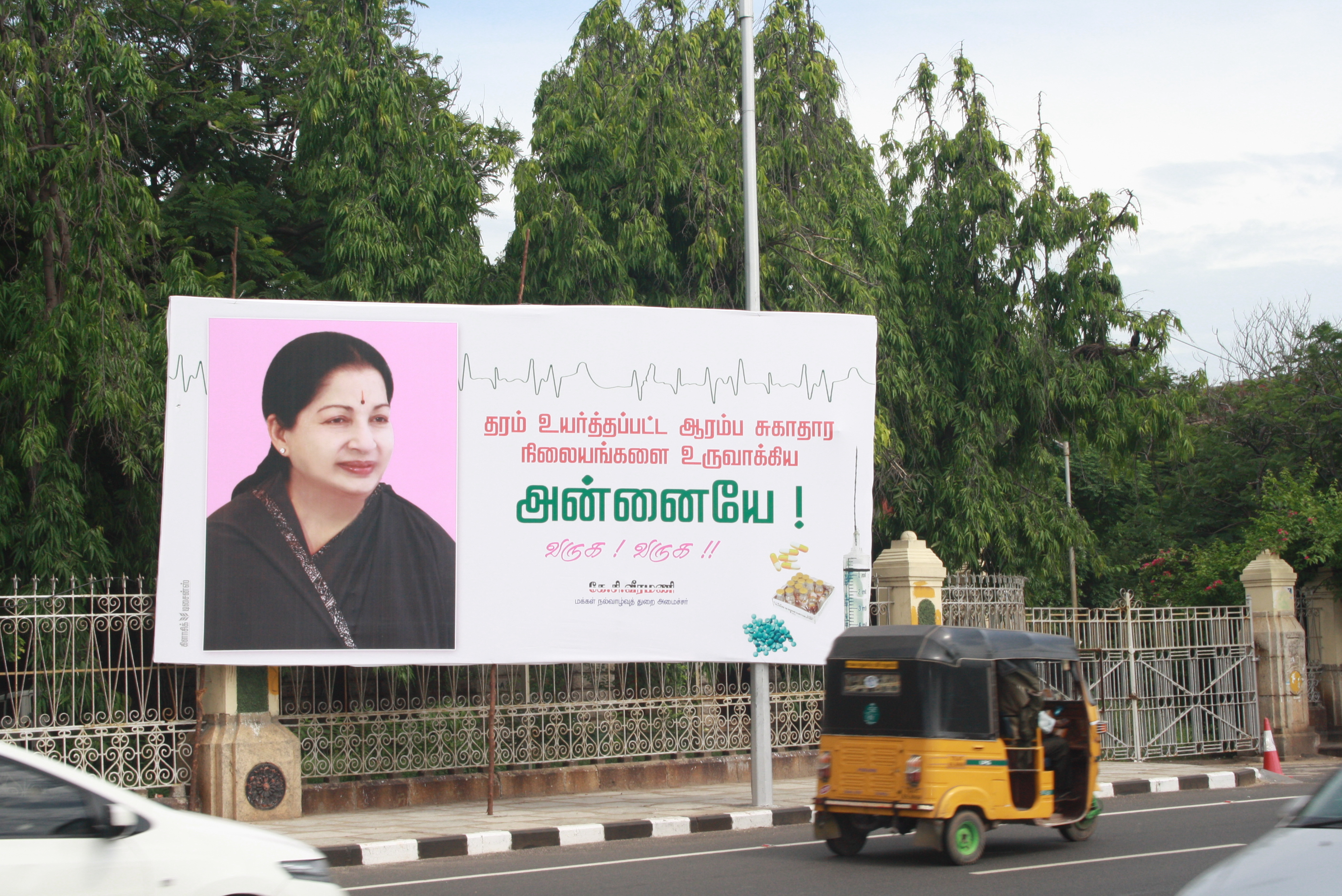
Flex banners placed by AIADMK functionaries hailing Jayalalithaa in Chennai.

Another controversy emerged around February 1995, during her birthday celebrations, when party cadres put up street hoardings and posters depicting the Chief Minister in the image of the Virgin Mary carrying the infant Jesus. This representation drew criticism from sections of the Christian community, with opposition leaders and church authorities stating that it had hurt religious sentiments. When the government learned of plans to hold reparation prayers under the Madurai Archdiocese over the depiction of Jayalalithaa as the Virgin Mary, it urged restraint. Ministers, including Raja Kannappan, criticised the move, but the prayers were held in Madurai on 26 March.

She made sure the respect and loyalty of the functionaries of the party was there for everyone to see. The entire Cabinet would fall in line and bow in front of the helicopter in which it was flying. Members of the party, at all levels never found it difficult to prostrate before her in full view of the public. Many of her worshipping followers are known to profess their loyalty through acts such as walking on hot coals or drawing her portrait with their blood. S Kirubakaran who is a Journalist-turned-advocate, wrote a book on Jayalalitha titled, 'Ammavin Kathai,' said that when M.G.R. was a Chief Minister, he carefully chose MLAs and Ministers for the first time after going through their knowledge and experience. But Jayalalithaa had begun to assign those who praised her. Even after her death, the AIADMK leaders continued to prostrate themselves before her burial ground.

=== 1999 Attempted murder case ===
A case of murder attempt was registered against Jayalalithaa, her close associate Sasikala, and Sasikala's nephew V Mahadevan has been recorded by the Chennai police on following a complaint by former Jayalalithaa's auditor, Rajasekaran, who alleged that he was summoned to the Poes Garden bungalow and violently assaulted by Jayalalithaa, Sasikala and Mahadevan with a stick and high-heeled shoes. Rajasekaran also stated that he had been forced by Jayalalithaa and Sasikala to sign two letters and a promissory note in respect of ₹50 lakhs. Jayalalithaa, however, denied the charges in a statement.

== Corruption cases ==
=== 1996 colour TV case ===
In the colour TV corruption case involving the purchase of TV sets to villagers, Jayalalithaa was charged and arrested. The TV sets were provided in the framework of a government education and entertainment plan for the village population. Officials said the TVs were purchased at inflated prices and claimed that some of the money paid for TV stations was returned as kickbacks to government officials. Later, she was acquitted as the accusation against them were not proven beyond doubt.

Detained in 1996, the media reported that 21.28 kg of gold jewels worth Rs 35 million, 10,500 saris, 91 designer watches, 750 pairs of shoes, 1,250 kg of silver objects worth 31.2 million, diamonds worth 20 million, a silver sword and 19 vehicles were among the priceless treasures found at her house.

=== 1995 Foster son and luxury wedding corruption ===
In 1995, Jayalalithaa's friend Sasikala's nephew Sudhakaran was engaged to the youngest daughter of Sivaji Ganesan. Jayalalithaa was a chief minister of state by this time. Jaya declared that Sudhakaran would be adopted as her foster son and said that she would be performing his marriage as his mother.

The wedding occupied a 2-km long lighted baraat pathway, ten dining halls each accommodating 25,000 people, and a 75,000 square foot pandal. Tons of plywood, plaster of paris and paint were used to erect cut-outs of Jayalalitha, arches, several hundred papier-mache statues, elaborate facades of palaces and gateways. The VIP invitations included a silver plate enclosed in a container, a silk saree and a silk dhoti, each worth ₹20,000. The marriage hosted more than 1,000 VIPs. More than 40,000 guests were granted accommodation in the hotel. A legion of elephants and chefs were brought in from Kerala. The incident, hailed as "the mother of all marriages". People's anger mounted against her as the crores were lavished at the wedding, and Jayalalithaa and Sasikala became symbols of corruption. She was accused of using government money to celebrate the grand marriage. The marriage may have triggered the AIADMK to lose all 39 Lok Sabha seats in the 1996 general election.

She was later sentenced for 4 years in jail in 2014 for corruption related to the marriage and the Disproportionate assets case.

Jayalalithaa owns a Guinness Book of World Records for conducting the luxury wedding. The record shows that over 15,000 guests have been invited. The Income-Tax Dept estimated the cost of the wedding at ₹100 million.

Jayalalithaa later disowned Sudhakaran as her foster son.

=== 1998 TANSI land deal case ===
The TANSI land deal case refers to the purchase of land by Jaya Publications, which included Jayalalithaa and her friend Sasikala, from the State Small Industry Company, Tansi, Guindy. Justice P Anbhazhagan delivered the judgement, and said that the evidence stated in the prosecution sheet, and that the sale deed of the prime land in Guindy had been carried out on 29 May 1992, in the unequivocal aim of cheating against the government. The Supreme Court disqualified her in September 2001, resulting in her stepping down and which made O. Panneerselvam as the chief minister of Tamil Nadu. The Madras High Court acquitted her and other 5 accused in the case of all the charges on 4 December 2001. Jayalalithaa returned the land to TANSI as per a Supreme Court Judgement.

=== Disproportionate assets case ===
Jayalalithaa was initially convicted of misusing her office during her tenure in 1991–1996. Subramanian Swamy was the main petitioner. Some of the accusations concerned expenditure on her foster son's luxurious marriage in 1996 and acquiring properties worth more than 666.5 million, as well as jewellery, bank deposits, investment and a convoy of luxury vehicles. The trial lasted for 18 years. Justice John Michael D'Cunha, in a detailed judgement, showed that the entire asset belonged to the accused and no one else. On 11 May 2015, Jayalalithaa was acquitted of all charges by the High Court of Karnataka. On 14 February 2017, the Supreme Court of India overruled the High Court of Karnataka. Sasikala and the other accused were convicted and sentenced to four years in prison, as well as to a fine of ₹100 million each. The case proceedings against Jayalalithaa were abated and dismissed on account of her death. The Supreme Court of India dismissed the review petition of Government of Karnataka on 5 April 2017 and the curative petition on 28 September 2018 to re-examine its decision to abate the proceedings against Jayalalithaa due to her death.

=== 2000 Pleasant Stay hotel case ===
Pleasant Stay hotel case is the construction of the seven-story hotel "Pleasant stay" in Kodaikanal, which was in breach of the rules for the construction of the seven-story building in a blue ville in the tourist resort town in Kodaikanal. Jayalalithaa, Selvaganapathy and Pandey granted a permission to create a seven-story structure at the hotel. The case was related to Jayalalithaa's supposed clearance by violating government rules to the development of a hotel in ecologically significant Kodaikanal. Jayalalithaa was sentenced in February 2000 to one year's strict imprisonment, with the penalty fined Rs. 1000 for conspiracy and criminal misconduct as a public employee. After the court's decision, AIADMK cadres started to riot and arson which burned alive three female students in the Dharmapuri bus burning and many were killed and injured. The Supreme Court disqualified her in September 2001, resulting in her stepping down and which made O. Panneerselvam as the chief minister of Tamil Nadu. The Madras High Court acquitted her and other 5 accused in the case of all the charges on 4 December 2001.

== Illness, death and reactions ==
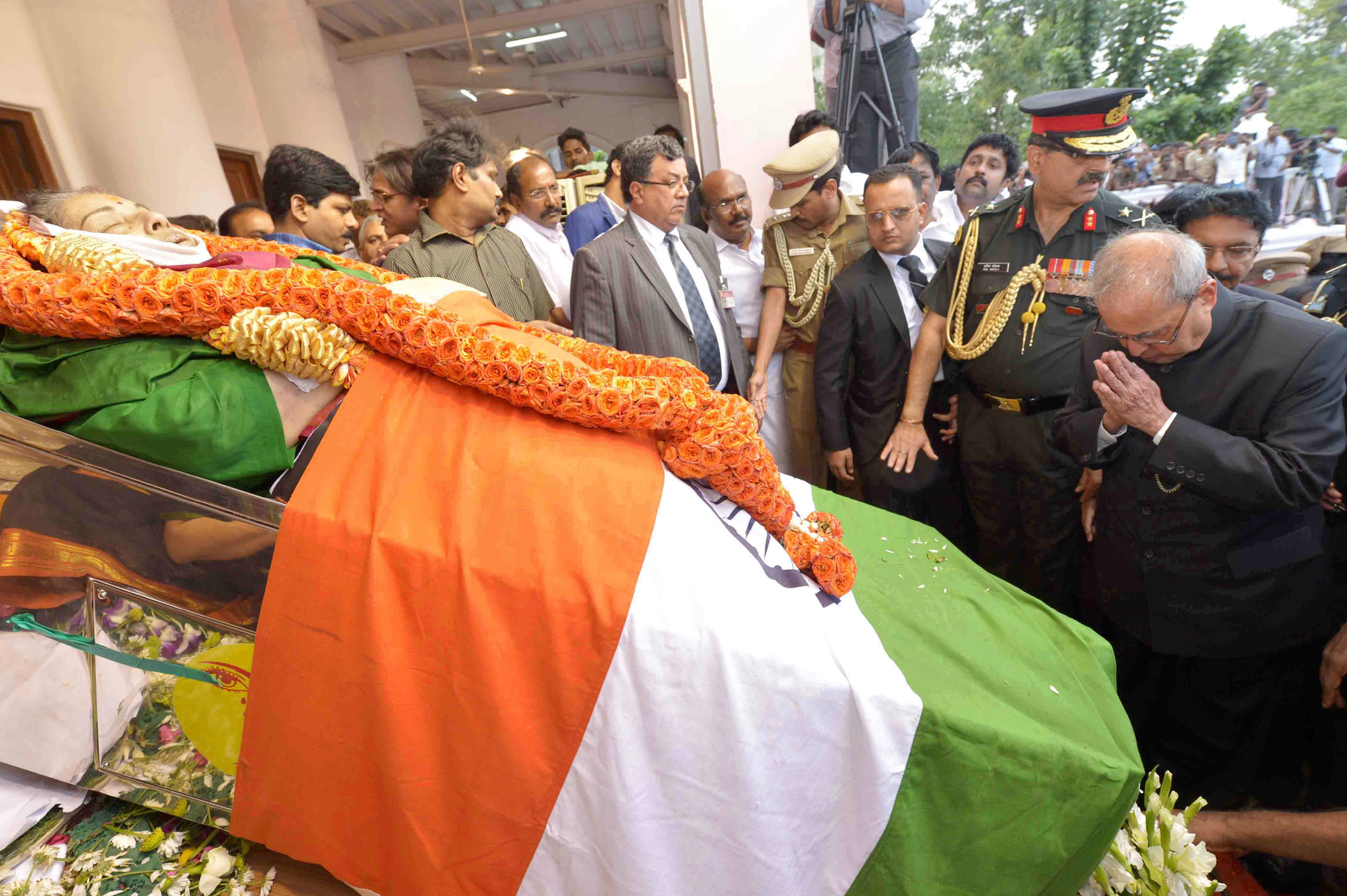
The then President Pranab Mukherjee paying tribute to Jayalalithaa in Rajaji Hall

On 22 September 2016, Jayalalithaa was admitted to Apollo Hospitals in Chennai at around 22:25 IST at night, reportedly suffering from an infection and acute dehydration. Her official duties were handed over to her minister O. Panneerselvam on 12 October 2016, though she continued to remain as the chief minister of the state. She was also said to be suffering from a severe pulmonary infection and septicaemia, which were cured. On 19 November 2016, she was shifted from the ICU to a private room in the normal ward of Apollo Hospital after nearly two months of treatment. On 4 December 2016, she was re-admitted to the intensive care unit after suffering a cardiac arrest around 16:45 on the evening. The hospital released a press statement stating that her condition was "very critical" and that she was on life support. On 5 December 2016, the hospital announced her death around 23:30 and she became the first female chief minister to die in office in India.

Government of India declared a one-day national mourning with the national flag in all government buildings flying at half-mast. While a seven-day state mourning from 6 to 12 December 2016 was observed by Government of Tamil Nadu, also three-day state mourning from 6 to 8 December 2016 were observed by Government of Kerala and the Government of Puducherry. One day state mourning on 6 December 2016 was observed by Government of Karnataka, Government of Bihar, Government of West Bengal, Government of Punjab, Government of Uttarakhand and Government of Goa. President Pranab Mukherjee, Prime Minister Narendra Modi, Union Ministers, several state Chief Ministers, political leaders, and the film fraternity condoled her death and paid their last tributes. Her body was kept in state at her residence Veda Nilayam in Poes Garden until the wake hours of 6 December 2016 and later at Rajaji Hall for public to pay their tribute. Her last rites were performed on the evening of 6 December 2016 and she was buried at the northern end of the Marina Beach in Chennai in a sandalwood casket engraved with "Puratchi Thalaivi Selvi J Jayalalithaa", near the grave of her mentor M. G. Ramachandran at the MGR Memorial.

The US and several other countries sent condolences. American Ambassador Richard Verma, Chinese Ambassador Luo Zhaohui, French Ambassador Alexandre Ziegler, Canadian High Commissioner to India Nadir Patel, Nepal President Bidya Devi Bhandari, Nepal Prime Minister Pushpa Kamal Dahal, Bangladesh Foreign Minister Abul Hassan Mahmood Ali, Sri Lankan President Maithripala Sirisena, Sri Lankan Prime Minister Ranil Wickremesinghe, Former Sri Lankan president Mahinda Rajapaksa, Turkish Ambassador Burak Akçapar, Turkmenistan Deputy Foreign Minister Berdyniyaz Matiyev, Singapore Foreign Affairs Minister Vivian Balakrishnan and Malaysian Indian Congress Party Mourned her death. Then Malaysian Prime Minister Najib Razak also sent his condolences.

The News of Jayalalithaa's demise was covered by International Media.

On 11 December 2016, the AIADMK said that over 470 party workers died, 'shocked' by Jayalalithaa's demise, and announced a solatium of Rs 300,000 to each of their families.

On 27 April 2017, One of Jayalalithaa's prominent assets, the Kodanad Tea Estate in the Nilgiris district became the focus of a high-profile criminal case involving a robbery and murder case, that attracted significant national media attention.

In September 2017, C. Sreenivaasan of AIADMK courted controversy by saying that V. K. Sasikala's family was responsible for Jayalalithaa's death. Sreenivasan said that he had to lie about the late chief minister's death because of pressure.

On 12 September 2017, Late J. Jayalalithaa was named the eternal general secretary of AIADMK at the AIADMK general council. On 11 July 2022, The AIADMK general council reversed its previous decision and brought back the general secretary post to elect Edappadi K. Palaniswami as party head.

=== The Memorial of Jayalalithaa ===
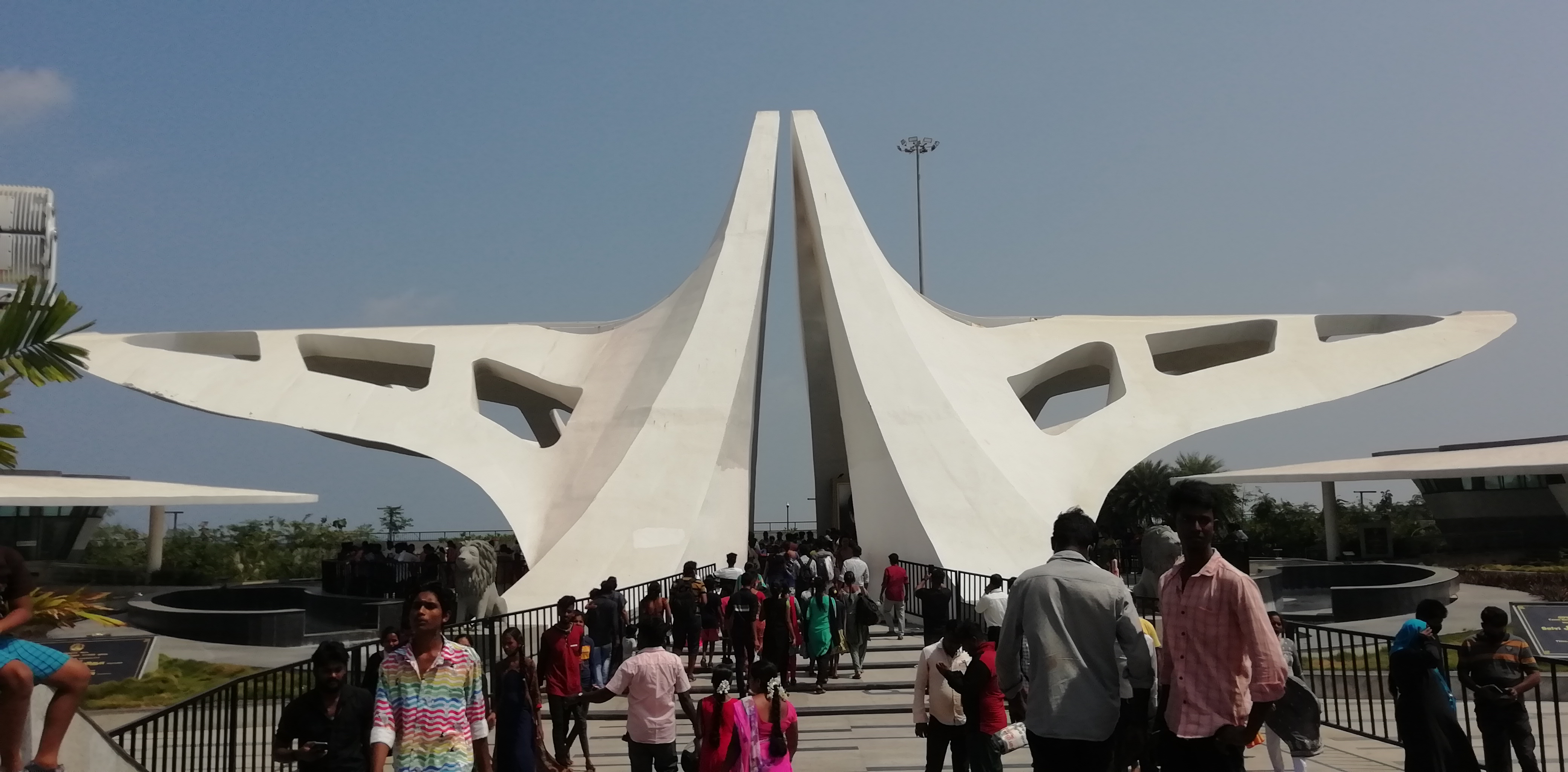
Jayalalithaa's burial site and memorial

The government of Tamil Nadu led by Edappadi K. Palaniswami issued Tamil Nadu Puratchi Thalaivi Dr J Jayalalithaa Memorial Foundation Ordinance, 2020 to acquire the Poes Garden residence in Chennai, which formerly belonged to the late Chief Minister J Jayalalitha. The ordinance faced opposition from the legal heirs of Jayalalithaa – Deepa (niece) and Deepak (nephew). A comprehensive list of all movable and immovable assets acquired in the process has been made available to the public. The immovable assets include "4.37kg of gold, 601.42kg of silver, 162 silverware, 11 TVs, 10 refrigerators, 38 ACs, 556 pieces of furniture, 6514 kitchen utensils, 12 kitchen accessories and racks, 1055 cutlery items, 15 pooja utensils, 10,438 pieces of personal-wear, 29 telephones including cellphones, 221 kitchen appliances, 251 electrical accessories, 8,376 books, 394 mementos, 653 documents, 253 stationery items, 1,712 furnishing accessories, 65 suitcases, 108 cosmetic items, 6 clocks, a photocopy machine, a printer and 959 miscellaneous items."

A memorial was built for her at a cost of ₹500 million rupees. The Jayalalithaa Memorial or the Amma Memorial is shaped like a phoenix. The Construction Works of Jayalalithaa's marina memorial started on 7 May 2018. On 27 January 2021, the memorial of Jayalalithaa was inaugurated by then Chief Minister Edappadi K. Palaniswami.

In a case challenging the Ordinance, the Madras High Court in May 2021 ruled J. Deepak and J. Deepa as legal heirs entitled to all the properties of Jayalalithaa in absence of a will. The court also issued a cautionary statement regarding the conversion of Jayalalithaa's residence into a memorial. The court has expressed concern that such a move may set a precedent for other political parties in the state to use public funds for the conversion of their leaders' residences into memorials.

=== Death Probe by Justice Arumugaswamy commission ===
Among the Public, Jayalalithaa's 75-day hospitalisation and her demise, remained unclear and shrouded in secrecy. DMK and other opposition parties sought a probe into her death.

==== Timeline ====
- 17 August 2017 – The one-man Commission by retired Justice was announced by then Chief Minister Edappadi K. Palaniswami.
- 25 September 2017 – Justice A Arumughaswamy Commission was formally constituted by then Chief Minister Edappadi K. Palaniswami to investigate the death of J Jayalalithaa.
- 22 November 2017 – The Commission commenced its hearing.
- 26 April 2019 – The Supreme Court of India stayed the functions of the commission based on the plea of the hospital in. The commission had probed with hundreds of people including expert doctors, medical staff, ministers and then state health secretary of Tamil Nadu. London-based doctor Dr. Richard Beale was also summoned in front of the Commission in 2019 since he was closely involved with the selection of treatment provided to then Chief Minister Jayalalithaa.
- 23 July 2021 – The 11th extension granted for the commission to submit its report was extended by the state government.
- 27 July 2021 – The Newly Elected DMK led Tamil Nadu Government sought permission from the Supreme Court to restart the inquiry into her death, as the inquiry into the mystery surrounding Jayalalithaa's death was one of the poll promises made by DMK in 2021 State Assembly Election.
- 30 November 2021 – The Supreme Court passed orders to allow setting up a medical board of AIIMS doctors to help the Justice A. Arumughaswamy Commission of Inquiry in gathering facts and examining witnesses in the case.
- 7 March 2022 – The Commission resumed its hearing as the supreme court vacated the previous stay order.
- 26 April 2022 – The Commission completed its hearing nearly after 5 years. The Commission probed more than 150 witnesses including former chief minister O. Panneerselvam, V. K. Sasikala, Elavarasi, Several IAS and IPS officers.
- 3 August 2022 – The final tenure extension was granted for the commission to submit its report by the state government. This was the 14th extension since its formation.
- 4 August 2022 – The AIIMS panel gave clean chit to Apollo Hospitals and found no errors in the Jayalalithaa treatment.
- 27 August 2022 – The Justice Arumughaswamy Commission finally submitted the 600-page report to the Chief Minister of Tamil Nadu M. K. Stalin after 5 years of its formation.
- 18 October 2022 – The State Government tabled the Commission report in the Tamil Nadu Legislative Assembly. It raised doubts over the medical treatment given to former chief minister Jayalalithaa. It has recommended further probe against her aide V. K. Sasikala, the then health minister C. Vijayabaskar, Dr. K. S. Sivakumar, of Apollo Hospitals, Dr J. Radhakrishnan, former health secretary, former chief secretary P Rama Mohana Rao, among others, for what it called as "lapses". The report also revealed that multiple people questioned during the probe said Jayalalithaa died on 4 December 2016, between 3 pm and 3:50 pm and not on 5 December 2016 as declared. In 2018, Sasikala's Brother Divakaran also stated that Jayalalithaa suffered clinical death on 4 December 2016 and, despite Apollo doctors' efforts to revive her on ventilator support, was declared biologically dead on the evening of 5 December 2016. It claimed that US doctor Samin Sharma had convinced the late CM Jayalalithaa to agree for an angio. It also questioned why she was not taken abroad for treatment even though Dr. Richard Beale was prepared to take the then Chief Minister.

== In popular culture ==
In Mani Ratnam's political drama Iruvar (1997), the character of Kalpana portrayed by Aishwarya Rai, was inspired by Jayalalithaa and her professional and personal relationship with M. G. Ramachandran. The 2008 movie Dasavathaaram shows her seeing flooding areas from helicopter. For the movie Attahasa, sources in July 2011 reported that Priyamani and Jayachitra were signed on to portray the roles of Muthulakshmi and Chief Minister Jayalalithaa, respectively. Priyamani denied being part of the project, adding that she was not offered the role. Faisal Saif completed work on major portions of a film titled Amma between 2014 and 2016, but was forced to shelve it following threats from members of Jayalalithaa's political party. The makers denied that the film was a biopic, but stated that actress Ragini Dwivedi portrayed a role resembling the politician.

Since Jayalalithaa's death, several filmmakers have announced biopics on the politician, with six currently in production. In January 2017, Telugu filmmaker Dasari Narayana Rao registered the title Amma and began preparing for a biopic on the politician. The film was being planned with Anushka Shetty in the lead role, but Rao's death in May 2017 effectively ended the project, despite indications that Mohan Babu may revive it. Producer Adithya Bharadwaj announced that his team were over a year into pre-production work for a proposed biopic of Jayalalithaa, during December 2017. Titled Thaai: Puratchi Thalaivi, he revealed that it would predominantly be a fictionalised retelling of her story with some real life footage also included. Bharadwaj suggested that he had briefly touched upon the possibility of a biopic with Jayalalithaa when she was alive, but the script had to be reworked following her death. Despite his suggestions that the film would begin production in January 2018, the project did not take off. Soon after news emerged about Vijay's and Priyadarshini's biopics in August 2018, Adithya reconfirmed that Bharathiraja had been signed to be the director of the film. He added that the team were considering either Aishwarya Rai or Anushka Shetty for the role of Jayalalithaa, and either Kamal Haasan or Mohanlal for the role of M. G. Ramachandran.

In August 2018, producer Vishnu Vardhan Induri of Vibri Media announced that he was working on a biopic of Jayalalithaa, and that A. L. Vijay would direct the project. The team announced that pre-production work and research was ongoing and that the film would focus on the personal life of the politician, showing her vulnerable side. Actress Vidya Balan was initially approached by Vijay to star in the lead role, while Sai Pallavi was considered for the supporting role of V. K. Sasikala. Titled Thalaivii (2021), the film began its shoot after a long pre-production phase in November 2019 with Kangana Ranaut signed to play the lead role. Within a day of Induri's announcement of making a film, director Priyadarshini announced that she had also been working for four months on the pre-production of a biopic, which would be launched in September 2018. Priyadarshini suggested that she had four scripts ready, with each focusing on different aspects of Jayalalithaa's life, and that the narration would be balanced by showing both her positive and negative sides. Titled The Iron Lady, Nithya Menen was signed on to play the lead role, while Aishwarya Rajesh and Varalaxmi Sarathkumar were in talks for a supporting role for the character of Sasikala.

On 14 December 2019, another biopic named Queen was released as a web series by Gautham Vasudev Menon. It became the fourth such announcement of a related project in August 2018. Production on the series progressed quietly throughout late 2018, with Ramya Krishnan selected to play Jayalalithaa, and Indrajith and Vamsi Krishna portraying M. G. Ramchandran and Sobhan Babu respectively. In October 2018, Sasikala's nephew Jeyanandh Dhivakaran announced a biopic on Jayalalithaa, which would focus more on her relationship with Sasikala and M. Natarajan. Director Linguswamy was signed on to the project, and began pre-production work by meeting close aides and politicians of Jayalalithaa. In April 2019, director Jegadeswara Reddy announced that he was set to make a film titled Sasilalithaa, which would showcase the relationship between Jayalalithaa and Sasikala. A first look poster was launched, with Reddy announcing that he would enter into talks with Kajol and Amala Paul to play the lead roles.

In Ponniyin Selvan: I, director Mani Ratnam reportedly drew inspiration from Jayalalithaa for his depiction of the character Kundavai, portrayed by Trisha.

Jayalalithaa appeared in an episode of Rendezvous with Simi Garewal, an informal chat show hosted by Indian actress Simi Garewal, where she talked about her personal life and acting/political career.

== Elections contested and positions held ==
=== Rajya Sabha elections ===
Elections	Constituency	Political party	Result
1984	Tamil Nadu	AIADMK	Won

=== Tamil Nadu Legislative Assembly elections ===
Elections	Assembly	Constituency	Political party	Result	Vote percentage	Opposition		
Elections	Assembly	Constituency	Political party	Result	Vote percentage	Candidate	Political party	Vote percentage
1989	9th	Bodinayakanur	AIADMK(J)	Won	54.41%	Muthu Manoharan	DMK	27.27%
1991	10th	Bargur	AIADMK	Won	65.18%	T. Rajendar	TMK	29.34%
1991	10th	Kangayam	AIADMK	Won	63.44%	N. S. Rajkumar Manraadiar	DMK	32.85%
1996	11th	Bargur	AIADMK	Lost	43.54%	E. G. Sugavanam	DMK	50.71%
2002 (Bye-election)	12th	Andipatti	AIADMK	Won	58.22%	Vaigai Sekar	DMK	27.64%
2006	13th	Andipatti	AIADMK	Won	55.04%	Seeman	DMK	36.29%
2011	14th	Srirangam	AIADMK	Won	58.99%	N. Anand	DMK	35.55%
2015 (Bye-election)	14th	Dr. Radhakrishnan Nagar	AIADMK	Won	88.43%	C. Mahendran	CPI	5.35%
2016	15th	Dr. Radhakrishnan Nagar	AIADMK	Won	55.87%	Shimla Muthuchozhan	DMK	33.14%

=== Positions in Parliament of the Republic of India ===
Elections	Position	Elected constituency	Term in office		
Elections	Position	Elected constituency	Assumed office	Left office	Time in office
1984	Member of Parliament, Rajya Sabha	Tamil Nadu	3 April 1984	28 January 1989	4 years, 300 days

=== Positions in Tamil Nadu Legislative Assembly ===
Elections	Position	Elected constituency	Term in office		
Elections	Position	Elected constituency	Assumed office	Left office	Time in office
1989	Leader of the Opposition	Bodinayakanur	9 February 1989	30 November 1989	294 days
1989	Member of the Legislative Assembly	Bodinayakanur	1 December 1989	30 January 1991	1 year, 60 days
1991	Chief Minister	Bargur	24 June 1991	12 May 1996	4 years, 323 days
2001	Chief Minister	Not Contested	14 May 2001	21 September 2001	130 days
2002	Chief Minister	Andipatti	2 March 2002	12 May 2006	4 years, 71 days
2006	Member of the Legislative Assembly	Andipatti	19 May 2006	28 May 2006	9 days
2006	Leader of the Opposition	Andipatti	29 May 2006	14 May 2011	4 years, 350 days
2011	Chief Minister	Srirangam	16 May 2011	27 September 2014	3 years, 134 days
2015	Chief Minister	Dr. Radhakrishnan Nagar	23 May 2015	22 May 2016	365 days
2016	Chief Minister	Dr. Radhakrishnan Nagar	23 May 2016	5 December 2016	197 days

== Awards and honours ==
- 1972: Received title of Kalaimamani Award by the Government of Tamil Nadu, which is the highest state honour in the field of Arts.
- 1991: Honorary doctorate received from University of Madras.
- 1992: Honorary doctorate received from The Tamil Nadu Dr. M.G.R. Medical University.
- 1993: Honorary doctorate received from Madurai Kamaraj University.

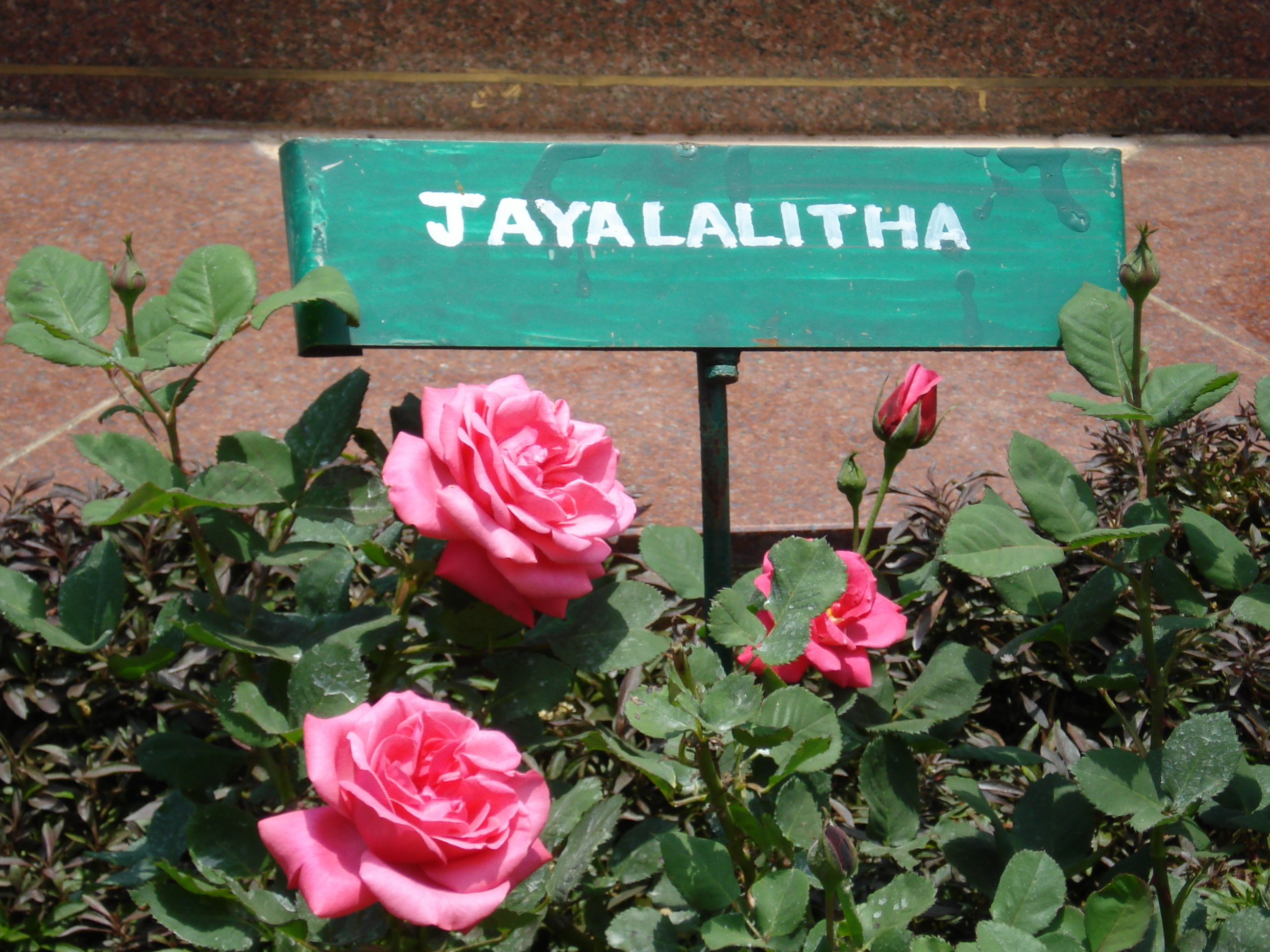
A rose variety named after Tamil Nadu Chief Minister Jayalalithaa

- 1995: The Government Rose Garden in Elk hill, Vijayanagaram of Udhagamandalam, briefly renamed the Jayalalithaa Rose Garden in 1995–96 to commemorate the Centenary Flower Festival in May 1995, hosts an annual Rose Show organised by the Horticulture Department in Government Botanical Garden.
- 2003: Honorary doctorate received from Tamil Nadu Agricultural University.
- 2003: Honorary doctorate received from Bharathidasan University.
- 2004: she was invited by the House of Lords, London to receive the "Woman Politician of the Decade Award" from the Asian Guild Awards.
- 2004: the "Golden Star of Honor and Dignity Award" was conferred upon her by the Ukraine-based International Human Rights Defense Committee, A Chartered Constitutive body of United Nations recognising her services in protecting the weaker section of society and in the field of gender equality in Tamil Nadu and India. Then United Nations Secretary General Kofi Annan, Russian President Vladimir Putin and Iceland Prime Minister David oddson were the only three previous recipients of the award
- 2005: Honoured with 'Paul Harris Fellow Recognition' & 'Lifetime achievement Award' by Rotary International.

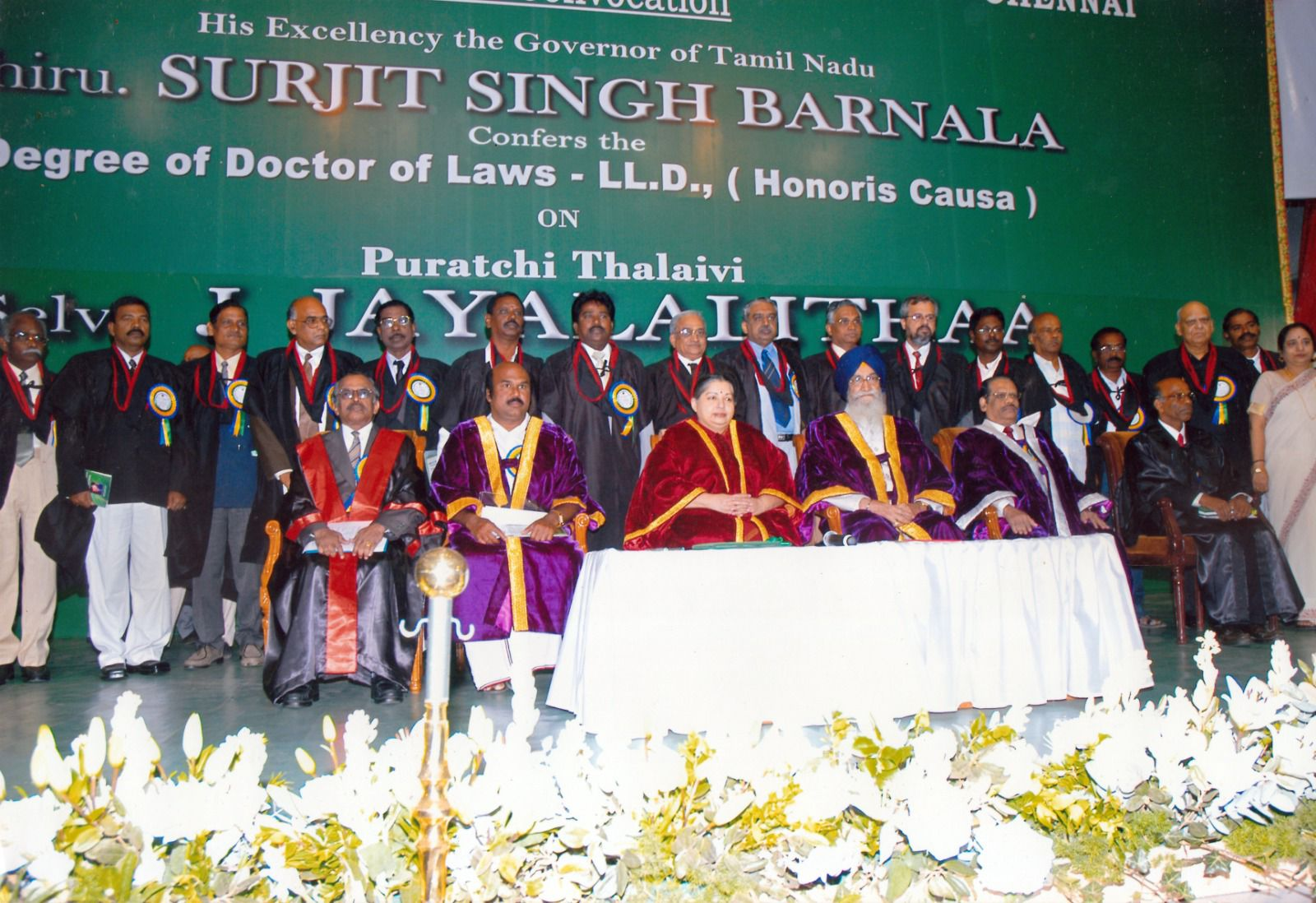
Jayalalithaa received the Degree of Law (Honoris Causa) conferred by the Tamil Nadu Dr. Ambedkar Law University from Tamil Nadu Governor Surjit Singh Barnala

- 2006: Honorary doctorate received from Tamil Nadu Dr. Ambedkar Law University in February 2006.
- 2011: a resolution was passed by the New Jersey General Assembly to appreciate her exemplary excellence and dedication as a leader and in service to the people of Tamil Nadu.
- 2018: Government of Tamil Nadu renamed Tamil Nadu Fisheries University after her as Tamil Nadu Dr. J. Jayalalithaa Fisheries University.
- 2019: Government of Tamil Nadu named three Kalaimamani award after her as Puratchi Thalaivi Dr. J. Jayalalithaa Special Kalaimamani Award.
- 2019: Government of Tamil Nadu renamed Tamil Nadu Music and Fine Arts University after her as The Tamil Nadu Dr. J. Jayalalithaa Music and Fine Arts University.
- 2020: Government of Tamil Nadu renamed Tamil Nadu State Council for Higher Education Campus after her as Dr. J. Jayalalithaa Campus.
- 2020: CMBT Metro Station in Chennai has been renamed as Puratchi Thalaivi Dr. J. Jayalalithaa CMBT Metro by Government of Tamil Nadu to honour her.

== Works ==
Jayalalithaa wrote 4 full-fledged novels, columns for Bommai and Thuglak in the 1970s and short stories for Kalki and Thai in the 1980s. She had an insatiable desire in her mind to write her autobiography, but it was not fulfilled until the last.

=== Novels and series ===
- Uravin Kaidigal (Prisoners of a relationship) – The Tamil version of an English novel which she wrote for Eve's Weekly, a woman's magazine published from Mumbai. Kalki Rajendran had made a fervent appeal to Jayalalithaa to write the same in Tamil. Then It was published as a serial in Kalki in 1980 and attracted both strong criticism and praise.
- Oruthikhey Sondham (Belong to one) – Jayalalithaa's First Tamil 95-paged Novel Published in June 1980 by Kumudam's monthly, Malai Mathi Magazine.
- Nenjile Oru Kanal (A fire in my heart) – Written in Kumudam Weekly Magazine, which she said was partly autobiographical. Soon after, Jayalalithaa stopped writing the column, stating that it might hurt people close to her, which was seen as signalling a possible reconciliation with her mentor MGR. She resumed the serial under the same title in the AIADMK's mouthpiece, "Thai". Before the final installment in Kumudam, she had announced through newspaper advertisements that, like the protagonist Devaki leaving her husband's house, the serial was leaving Kumudam and would continue elsewhere (Thai).
- Ennangal Sila (Some of the thoughts) – Published as Series in Thuglak Weekly Magazine for nearly 7 years, which was written anonymously by Jayalalithaa, Eventually Her identity was disclosed by the editor Cho Ramaswamy.
- Nee indri Nanillai (I am not without you) – Novel Published in Valampuri John's Kavithabanu Publications.

=== Books ===
- Manadhai Thotta Malargal (Flowers that touch the mind) – The Collective version of 45 Columns written as Enakku Pidithavai in Thai weekly magazine. In this book, she wrote about her favourites (Place Jaipur, Flower, Animal Elephant, Drink Tea, Song "Chinna Payale Chinna Payale" from Arasilankumari (1961) movie, Film Producer B. R. Panthulu, writer, journalist, Philosophist Kahlil Gibran, teacher, Painter Leonardo da Vinci, Painting Mona Lisa, Biblical Story Joseph (Genesis), Novel David Copperfield, Philosopher Socrates, Quote by Maxim Gorky, Betrayer Khusrau Khan).

=== Short stories and columns ===
Jayalalithaa also carved many Short stories and Columns in Tamil and English. She had written an anonymous critic article in 'Thuglak' magazine which focused on the harassment of a woman under the police custody somewhere in North India. In 'Thuglak' magazine, she wrote about Tamil Nadu Politics, National Politics and International Affairs. She also focused on writing about Negligence of Indian doctors, Italian law for pregnant women and The possibility of astrology. In 'Bommai' magazine, she also wrote about beauty tips. In 1981, Jayalalithaa, writing for the weekly Idhayam Pesugirathu, reviewed the Tamil film Aani Ver and critiqued the heroine's decision in the story, which portrayed a lower-caste village girl who becomes a collector but struggles due to her illiterate husband. Unable to manage the conflict, the heroine ultimately resigns to become a dutiful wife.

== Other interests ==
=== Leisure interests ===
Jayalalithaa is also interested in reading, classical music, Western music, piano, swimming, cricket, tennis, basketball, sketching, chess, athletics and horse-riding. She admired actors such as Dustin Hoffman, Robert De Niro, Dilip Kumar and Shammi Kapoor. Her favourite singers include LaVern Baker. As a school girl, she had a huge crush on former Indian skipper Nari Contractor. In an interview with Simi Garewal in the 1990s, Jayalalitha had revealed her fondness for the cricketer and she had followed his game closely during the 1960s. In Kumudam Magazine, she had written that she used to watch Test matches. When she found difficult in booking last-minute tickets for special enclosure, she decided to become the Member of Tamil Nadu Cricket Association through which she could receive tickets automatically for all Test matches and Ranji Trophy. On her request, then famous cricket commentator and the general manager of Das prakash Group of Hotels P. Ananda Rao who had influence on TNCA, represented her case on his board meeting. Hence, Jayalalithaa became the first independent and patron women member of Tamil Nadu Cricket Association in the period of 1973–74.

==== Favourite books ====
In an interview, Jayalalithaa said that when she was just eight years old, she used to read Rajaji's Mahabharata (Vyasar Virundhu) and Ramayana (Chakravarthi Thirumagan). Being a child, she was very fond of Hans Christian Andersen, Grimms and Enid Blyton's the Malory Towers series. In later years, she read the novel works of Denise Robins, Barbara Cartland, Mills and Boon. Her favourite authors were Charles Dickens, William Wordsworth, Christina Rossetti, Alexandre Dumas, Jane Austen, Oscar Wilde, George Bernard Shaw, Sidney Sheldon, Georgette Heyer, Danielle Steel, Pearl S. Buck, Agatha Christie, Thomas Hardy, Khushwant Singh, Kingsley Amis, Alistair MacLean, Alfred Tennyson, Georg Wilhelm Friedrich Hegel, Kahlil Gibran, James Hadley Chase and Somerset Maugham.

She also read Shakespeare's plays like The Merchant of Venice, Danielle Steel's Malice, Jung Chang's Wild Swans, Jean Plaidy's series on the Tudor dynasty, Daniel Defoe's Robinson Crusoe, Oscar Wilde's De Profundis, Arthur Conan Doyle's Sherlock Holmes, John Milton's Paradise Lost and Paradise Regained, Wayne Dyer's Wishes Fulfilled, The Sky's the Limit, and Your Erroneous Zones, Margaret Mitchell's Gone with the Wind, Li Zhisui's The Private Life of Chairman Mao, Alexandre Dumas's The Three Musketeers and The Count of Monte Cristo, Nehru's The Discovery of India, Chandrika Prasad Srivastava's "Lal Bahadur Shastri: A Life of Truth in Politics", Mary Higgins Clark's "Two Little Girls in Blue", Charles Dickens's A Tale of Two Cities, Nelson Mandela's Long Walk to Freedom, P. V. Narasimha Rao's The Insider, Charles Kurzman's Liberal Islam, Nihal Singh's "The Rocky Road of Indian Democracy: Nehru to Narasimha Rao", William Davis's "The Lucky Generation: A Positive View of the 21st Century", Alice Amsden's "Escape from Empire: The Developing World's Journey Through Heaven and Hell", Dale Carnegie's "The Leader In You", Michael H. Hart's The 100: A Ranking of the Most Influential Persons in History, Kalam's India 2020, Robert Hargrove's "E-Leader", Jacob and Wilhelm Grimm's The Complete Grimms' Fairy Tales, Jane Polley's "Stories Behind Everyday Things", The various editions of the Print Version of Encyclopædia Britannica, Dan Brown's The Da Vinci Code, Alex Hook's "Illustrated History of the Third Reich", Sylvia Nasar's A Beautiful Mind, Elaine Partnow's "The New Quotable Woman", Waldmans's Great Illustrated Classics, Günter Grass's Peeling the Onion, Jeffrey Archer's Mightier Than the Sword, Yuri Andropov's "Speeches and Writings", Yugan's "Nizhal Padam Nijap Padam", Rajendra Sareen's "Pakistan The India Factor", R. Thandavan's "All India Anna Dravida Munnetra Kazhagam: Political Dynamics in Tamil Nadu", Sunanda K. Datta-Ray's "'Waiting for America - India and the US in the New Millennium'", Douglas Homles's "eGov: E-Business Strategies for Government", Vikram Seth's A Suitable Boy, Larry Wilde's "The Official Doctors Jokebook", Anna Pasternak's "Princess in Love", Tirumantiram, Thirukkural, Bill Clinton's My Life, Robert Dallek's An Unfinished Life: John F. Kennedy, 1917–1963, and The biographies of Ronald Reagan, Abraham Lincoln, Margaret Thatcher, C. N. Annadurai, M. G. Ramachandran and Herself. P. C. Alexander's "Through the Corridors of Power: An Insider's Story", Philip Ziegler's Biography of Mountbatten, A. Walton Litz's "Major American Short Stories", Conn Iggulden's "The Gates of Rome", Shrikant Verma's "End of an Era: Indira Gandhi 1917-1984", Indira Gandhi's "The Years of Endeavour", Gerhard Weinberg's "Visions of victory", G. S. Chhabra's "Advanced Study in the History of Modern India", Charlotte Brontë's Jane Eyre, Paul Johnson's "The Oxford Book of British Political Anecdotes", Justice V. R. Krishna Iyer's "Death and After", Robert Harold Schuller's "Life's Not Fair But God is Good", Lettie Cowman's "Streams in the Desert", V. I. Lenin: Selected Works, Karl Marx's Das Kapital, Jung Chang's Empress Dowager Cixi: The Concubine Who Launched Modern China, Robert Ludlum's The Road to Omaha, John Canning's "100 Great Modern Lives", Richard Herrnstein and Charles Murray's The Bell Curve, Chandrashekhara Kambara's "Singarevva and the Palace", Caroline P. Murphy's "The Pope's Daughter", Sara Dickey's "Cinema and the urban poor in south India", The works of Periyar, C. N. Annadurai, Kannadasan, Vaali, Deng Xiaoping, Sandilyan and Adi Shankara. She liked books on history, geography, science, philosophy, religion, fiction, medicine and law. She had a great interest in reading about Victorian era Classics, English Renaissance, French Revolution, Hitler-Mussolini friendship, Tudor history and Anglo-Saxon dynasties. According to her trusted former counsel N. Jothi, Jayalalithaa admired comparisons between herself and Queen Elizabeth I, the “Virgin Queen”, and took particular pleasure in being likened to the long-reigning monarch, who, like Jayalalithaa, remained unmarried and without her parents or siblings by her side during much of her reign.

Jayalalithaa on the chat show – 'Rendezvous with Simi Garewal'

" Yes indeed (I had crushes). I remember having a great crush on Nari Contractor, the cricketer. I used to go to Test matches just to watch him. And I had another crush on Shammi Kapoor (laughed heartily). One of my favourite films even today is Junglee (1961) and the Yahoo! song."

— Jayalalithaa, Rendezvous with Simi Garewal, April 1999

== Notes ==
Assembly seats
Preceded by Thanga Tamil Selvan	Member of Tamil Nadu Legislative Assembly; 2006–2011	Succeeded by Thanga Tamil Selvan
Political offices
Preceded by O. Subramanian	Leader of Opposition in the Tamil Nadu Legislative Assembly; 1989–1989	Succeeded by S. R. Eradha
Vacant President's Rule Title last held by M. Karunanidhi	Chief Minister of Tamil Nadu; First Tenure; 1991–1996	Succeeded by M. Karunanidhi
Preceded by M. Karunanidhi	Chief Minister of Tamil Nadu; Second Tenure; 2001–2001	Succeeded by O. Panneerselvam
Preceded by O. Panneerselvam	Chief Minister of Tamil Nadu; Third Tenure; 2002–2006	Succeeded by M. Karunanidhi
Preceded by O. Panneerselvam	Leader of Opposition in the Tamil Nadu Legislative Assembly; 2006–2011	Succeeded by Vijayakanth
Preceded by M. Karunanidhi	Chief Minister of Tamil Nadu; Fourth Tenure; 2011–2014	Succeeded by O. Panneerselvam
Preceded by O. Panneerselvam	Chief Minister of Tamil Nadu; Fifth Tenure; 2015–2016	Succeeded by Herself
Preceded by Herself	Chief Minister of Tamil Nadu; Sixth Tenure; 2016–2016	Succeeded by O. Panneerselvam
Party political offices
Preceded by M. G. Ramachandran	General Secretary of the All India Anna Dravida Munnetra Kazhagam; 1988–2016	Succeeded by Edappadi K. Palaniswami
