= A. M. Nandakumar =

Indian film director and screenwriter

A.M. Nandakumar
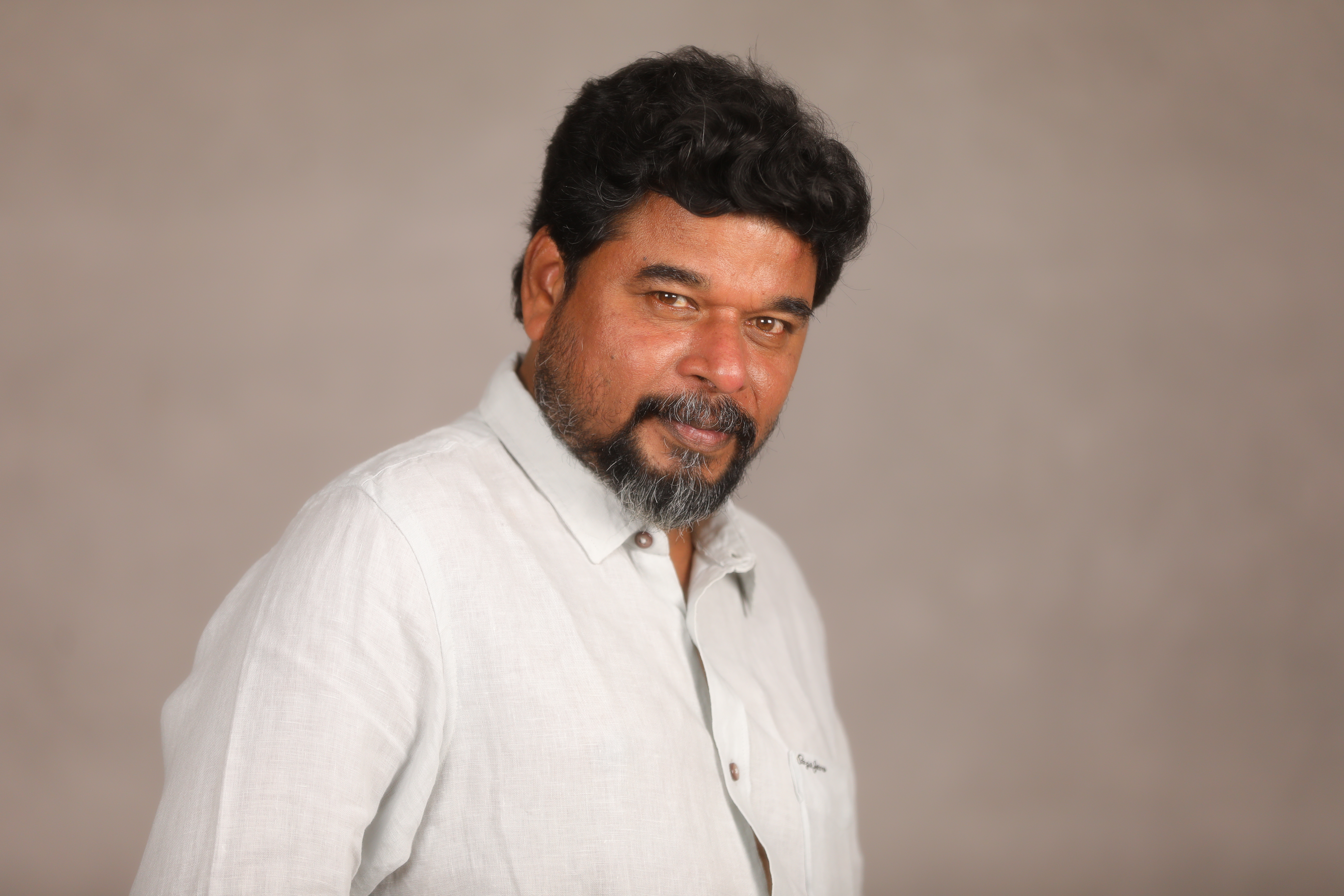
- Born: Aranthangi, Pudukottai District
- Education: VSS Govt. Arts College
- Occupations: Film director, screen writer
- Years active: 1997 — present

A. M. Nandakumar is an Indian film director and screenwriter who has worked on Tamil language films. His first was the 2003 action drama film, Thennavan, starring Vijaykanth and Kiran Rathod.

== Career ==
After working as an assistant director for several years to P. Vasu, Manivannan and Rajasekar, Nandakumar successfully pitched the story of Kodiesvaran to the producer K. T. Kunjumon. After initially considering either Vijay or Ajith Kumar for the lead role, the team chose the producer's son, Eby Kunjumon. Production started in 1997 with Eby appearing with Simran and the Hindi actress Karisma Kapoor making a guest appearance in an item number. The film's music album and trailer were released in early 1999, but Kunjumon's financial troubles meant that the film failed to have a theatrical release. If released, the film would have been among the highest budgeted films of the time. As the film became stuck, Nandakumar worked on a Japanese film titled Nattu Odoru! Ninja Densetsu, starring Neha Dhupia, that was shot in Chennai.

Nandakumar worked on another script titled Aasan. He approached Vijayakanth to work on the film, but it became clear that the script had been already pitched to the actor as Ramana by AR Murugadoss. Following the confusion, Vijayakanth apologetically called Nandakumar to make another film with him titled Thennavan (2003). The film opened to mixed reviews, with a critic from The Hindu noting, "Thennavan would have been a tailor made story for Vijayakanth but for the flawed script, clichéd dialogue and unappealing caricatures. Somewhere down the line everyone from the director (M. Nandakumaran) and the hero seem to have lost interest."

Nandakumar announced Jambhavan (2006) in December 2005 and began production shortly after a launch event held in Tirupathi. Prashanth was signed to play the lead role, while Nila and Meghna Naidu were signed to portray the film's lead heroines. The team began filming with a 30-day schedule in Tenkasi in southern Tamil Nadu. The making of the film was disrupted in January 2006, when the actress Nila briefly walked out of the film after falling out with the producers. The film opened in September 2006 and received predominantly negative reviews. A critic from Sify noted, "This film is a slapdash enterprise that will make you groan," adding "It caters strictly to B and C class audiences and leaves you cold." Another reviewer noted the similarity to Baashha (1995) adding "the quality of these remakes has ranged from entertaining to outright bad and Prashanth's Jaambavan unfortunately comes in at the lower end of that scale". Indiaglitz also noted the similarity adding that "director Nandakumar has taken cue from a few 'mass films', but just has not managed to cobble them with any sense of purpose".

In 2014, Nandakumar made Kalkandu and the film gained media attention before release, owing to the lead actor Gajesh's debut. He was the son of the actor-dancer Anand Babu and grandson of the comedian Nagesh. Following the appearance of late actor Nagesh's animation in Kochadaiiyaan (2014), Nandakumar insisted on having a sequence in his film, where all three generations of the family appear in one scene through computer imagery. The film was shot mainly in Tamil Nadu, in places such as Tiruchi and Kanyakumari. It had a limited release in October 2014, owing to the presence of bigger budget films at the box office, and opened to mixed reviews with a critics noting it "gets stuck towards average". Another reviewer noted that the film had a dated feel and called it "excruciatingly long". Nandakumar later worked on a project titled K7 - Kesavan with debutant Sakthivel, though the film failed to have a theatrical release.

== Filmography ==
=== Films ===
| Year | Title | Language | Production House | Cast | Notes |
|---|---|---|---|---|---|
| 2003 | Thennavan | Tamil | Captain Cine Creations | Vijayakanth Kiran Rathod | |
| 2006 | Jambhavan | Tamil | ESK Frames Rajalakshmi Kalaikudam | Prashanth Nila Meghna Naidu | |
| 2014 | Kalkandu | Tamil | Rajarathinam Films | Gajesh Dimple Chopade Akhil|| | |

=== Television ===
| Year | Title | Functioned as | | Production House | Channel | Language |
| Year | Title | Director | Project Head | Production House | Channel | Language |
|---|---|---|---|---|---|---|
| 2018 | Maya | Yes | No | Avni Telemedia | Sun TV | |
| 2019 | Lakshmi Stores | No | Yes | Avni Telemedia | Sun TV | Tamil & Telugu |
| 2021 | Jyothi | No | Yes | Avni Telemedia | Sun TV | |
| 2024 | Moondru Mudichu | Yes | No | A R Film World | Sun TV | |
