= Diminished responsibility =

Legal defense

In criminal law, diminished responsibility (or diminished capacity) is a potential defense by excuse by which defendants argue that although they broke the law, they should not be held fully criminally liable for doing so, as their mental functions were "diminished" or impaired.

== Overview ==
Diminished capacity is a partial defense to charges that require that the defendant act with a particular state of mind. For example, if the felony murder rule does not apply, first degree murder requires that the state prove beyond a reasonable doubt that the defendant acted with premeditation, deliberation, and the specific intent to kill—all three are necessary elements of the state's case. If evidence exists, sufficient to create a reasonable doubt as to whether the defendant because of mental illness or "defect" possessed the capacity to premeditate, deliberate or form the specific intent to kill then the state cannot convict the defendant of first degree murder. This does not mean that the defendant is entitled to an acquittal. The defendant still might be convicted of second-degree murder which only requires that the defendant act with general malice.

The defense's acceptance in American jurisdictions varies considerably. The majority of states have adopted it by statute or case decision, and a minority even recognise broader defenses such as "irresistible impulse". Some U.S. states restrict the defense to the charge of murder only where a successful defense will result in a manslaughter conviction instead of murder. Until recently, the Republic of Ireland did not accept the partial defense. The Irish Supreme Court had rejected the existence of the defense in DPP v O'Mahony. The case was abrogated, however, by enactment of the Criminal Law (Insanity) Act 2006, effective June 1, 2006. The act, in pertinent part, specifically adopted the partial defense for the charge of murder where a successful defense will result in a manslaughter conviction instead of murder.

The defense is to be contrasted with insanity which is a complete but affirmative defense. In most jurisdictions a defendant would be acquitted on the grounds of insanity if the defendant established to the satisfaction of the jury that he suffered from such a mental disease or defect that he was unable to appreciate the consequences of his actions or did not know what he was doing was wrong. As noted a successful insanity defense will result in acquittal although a number of jurisdictions have adopted the guilty but insane verdict. The defense of insanity and diminished capacity although clearly distinct are not inconsistent defenses and both may be at issue in the same case. The critical distinctions are that diminished capacity is a partial, negating defense (negates an element of the state's case) with the burden on the state to show that the defendant acted with the requisite state of mind while insanity is a complete but affirmative defense—the defendant bearing the burden of proving that he was legally insane.

This is an aspect of a more general insanity defense (see the M'Naghten rules). The defense "was first recognized by Scottish common law to reduce the punishment of the 'partially insane'." It developed from the practice of juries in the 19th century of returning verdicts of guilty with a recommendation as to mercy or mitigation of sentence to reflect any extenuating circumstances. In a series of decisions, given mainly by Lord Deas, a doctrine grew that various types of mental weakness could have the effect of reducing what would otherwise be a conviction for murder (which attracted capital punishment) to one for culpable homicide (where the courts had greater discretion in sentencing). An example of a "diminished capacity" might be extremely low intelligence. In the English case of R v Raven, a man who had a physical age of 22 years but a mental age of only 9 years felt provoked by homosexual advances and killed his perceived attacker. His mental deficiency was not in dispute and, since a child of 9 years would not have been criminally responsible (see s50 Children and Young Persons Act 1933), and his mental responsibility for his acts was substantially impaired, manslaughter was the only realistic verdict. The rationale of the defense is that, as a precondition to punishment, the criminal law requires conduct to be voluntary. If something interferes with the capacity of the individual to choose to break the law, this should be reflected by an excuse or exculpation. The law should balance the need to be fair to the individual wrongdoer, but equally offer some protection to society from a person who may not have complete control over their behavior.

The effect of the defense varies between the jurisdictions and depends on the offence charged. In some cases, it will result in full excuse and therefore produce a verdict of "not guilty". In others, it offers only exculpation to a degree, resulting in the substitution of a lesser offence (e.g., manslaughter instead of murder) or a mitigated sentence.

== English law ==
Section 2 of the Homicide Act 1957 states:

(1) Where a person kills or is party to a killing of another, he shall not be convicted of murder if he was suffering from an abnormality of mental functioning which –

(a) arose from a medical condition

(b) substantially impaired D's ability to do one or more of the things mentioned in subsection (1A), and

(c) provides an explanation for D's acts and omissions in doing or being a party to the killing.

(1A) Those things are –

(a) to understand the nature of D's conduct;

(b) to form a rational judgment;

(c) to exercise self-control.

(1B) For the purposes of subsection (1)(c), an abnormality of mental functioning provides and explanation of D's conduct if it causes, or is a significant contributory factor in causing, D to carry out that conduct.

== Scottish law ==
Although the term is not used during the proceedings, the 1795 trial of Sir Archibald Gordon Kinloch for the murder of his brother Sir Francis Kinloch, 6th baronet of Gilmerton under Robert McQueen, Lord Braxfield is one of the earliest clear examples of recognition of diminished responsibility. Whilst found guilty, and usually expecting a death sentence, not only was Kinloch sentenced to life imprisonment instead, but two days after the judgement (17 July 1795) the accused was released into the care of a doctor (William Farquharson) on the understanding that Kinloch be kept in a secure environment (the doctor's own house).

During the course of the 20th century the courts began to limit the mental conditions falling within diminished responsibility. In HM Advocate v Savage Lord Alness addressed the jury (at 51):

It is very difficult to put it in a phrase, but it has been put in this way: that there must be aberration or weakness of mind; that there must be some form of mental unsoundness; that there must be a state of mind which is bordering on, though not amounting to, insanity; that there must be a mind so affected that responsibility is diminished from full responsibility to partial responsibility. In other words, the prisoner in question must be only partially accountable for his actions. And I think one can see running through the cases that there is implied ... that there must be some form of mental disease.

This statement became the authoritative version of the test for diminished responsibility and the various factors mentioned by Lord Alness were regarded as being cumulative in nature. The effect was that the test became difficult to satisfy, and the courts adopted the position that the scope of the plea was not to be further widened (e.g. Carraher v HM Advocate) held that the plea was not available to a person suffering from psychopathic personality. But in Galbraith v HM Advocate it was held that the formula in Savage was not to be read in a narrow sense, and it was not necessary that all the criteria in that formula had to be present. Furthermore, although the plea had to be based on some form of mental abnormality, that condition need not be one bordering on insanity. Instead the court ruled that diminished responsibility required the existence of an abnormality of mind which had the effect that the accused's ability to determine or control his actings was substantially impaired. However, the Court excluded from the scope of the plea:

1. any condition brought on by the consumption of drink or drugs, and
2. psychopathic personality disorder.

The Scottish Law Commission reported in 2004 proposing changes to the law on insanity and diminished responsibility.

== Australia ==
At present, diminished responsibility exists as a statutory partial defence in most Australian jurisdictions. The defence is only available in cases of murder and serves to reduce the offence to manslaughter. In Australia it has been the subject of sentencing concerns specifically in relation to the weight attributed to protection of the community when sentencing offenders found guilty of manslaughter on the grounds of diminished responsibility

In NSW, the partial defence of 'diminished responsibility' was replaced by the partial defence of "substantial impairment" in 1998. The burden is on the defendant to prove the defence, on the balance of probabilities. There are three conditions that the defendant must prove. The first is the defendant must be suffering from an abnormality of the mind at the time of the acts/omissions causing death; see also the case of Byrne for the definition of 'abnormality of the mind'. Second, the abnormality must be the result of an underlying condition. Third, the impairment must be so substantial as to warrant liability for murder being reduced to manslaughter.

== India ==
Supreme Court of India bench headed by Justice Gogoi in a review petition upheld the principle of Diminished responsibility in the 2000 Dharmapuri bus burning and commuted to life imprisonment the death penalty given by the Salem district court and upheld by the Madras High Court and by another Supreme Court bench to three AIADMK party activists who had a set on fire a fully occupied bus with 44 girls and 2 lecturers of the Tamil Nadu Agricultural University on an educational tour to protest Jayalalithaa's conviction in Pleasant Stay hotel case in this three college girls were burnt alive and 16 college girls suffered burn injuries were acting on mob frenzy and setting a legal precedent.

== United States ==
=== Federal law ===
The U.S. Sentencing Guidelines provide, "A downward departure may be warranted if (1) the defendant committed the offense while suffering from a significantly reduced mental capacity; and (2) the significantly reduced mental capacity contributed substantially to the commission of the offense."

=== State law ===
California was the first state in the U.S. to adopt the diminished capacity defense, beginning with People v. Wells (1949) and People v. Gorshen (1959). The doctrine would soon be abolished by ballot initiative in 1982 following the negative publicity surrounding the case of Dan White, who in 1978 had killed George Moscone and Harvey Milk. While White's defense team did argue successfully for a ruling of diminished capacity, resulting in a verdict of voluntary manslaughter rather than murder, an urban legend that the defense had blamed White's actions on the ingestion of sugar and junk food (the so-called "Twinkie defense") sprang up out of inaccurate media coverage. Weeks later, in a subsequent debate in the state legislature over diminished capacity rulings, assemblyman Alister McAlister waved a Twinkie in the air to make his point. As of 2002, the California Penal Code states, "The defense of diminished capacity is hereby abolished ... there shall be no defense of diminished capacity, diminished responsibility, or irresistible impulse".

== See also ==
- Insanity defense
- Intoxication defense
- Right to an effective remedy
- Settled insanity
- Victims' rights
