= Pagadi Aattam =

2017 Indian film by Ram K. Chandran

- Release poster
- Directed by: Ram K. Chandran
- Produced by: T. S. Kumar; K. Ramaraj; D. Subas Chandrabose; A. Gunasekar
- Starring: Rahman; Gowri Nandha; Surendar; Monica; Akhil
- Cinematography: Krishnasamy
- Edited by: K. Sreenivas
- Music by: Karthik Raja
- Production companies: Marram Movies; Bharani Movies
- Release date: 17 February 2017
- Country: India
- Language: Tamil

Pagadi Aattam (transl. Chess Game) is a 2017 Indian Tamil-language crime film written and directed by Ram K. Chandran. Featuring Rahman, Gowri Nandha, Surendar Shanmugam, Akhil, Monica and, the film's score and soundtrack is composed by Karthik Raja and cinematography is done by E. Krishnasamy. The film began production during early 2016 and was released on 17 February 2017.

== Plot ==
Surya is a rich spoiled brat, who is also a playboy. He has many girlfriends, whose names are saved in his phone as noodles, lemon, coffee etc. On his way to pick one of his girlfriends, he is kidnapped. He wakes up in a small confined box, with a phone inside. Later, Surya gets a call from the kidnapper. Surya demands the terms to set him free. The kidnapper asks him to cut off his private part within an hour's time.

An hour later the kidnapper calls back but Surya has not done as he was instructed. Surya begs the kidnapper for his release. The kidnapper asks if Surya remembers the sins he has committed and how many women he has ruined so far. Then Surya remembers the name of a girl named Kousalya, an innocent poor girl whom he had cheated in the name of love and recorded their intimate video. After which the girl commits suicide.

Meanwhile, the Investigating Officer Devendra Kumar takes up this case. Using his skill, he tracks down the history of Surya and finds out that he is a womaniser and is responsible for the death of Kousalya. He also finds out that Kousalya's sister is the kidnapper. But he tells her that Surya doesn't deserve to live and lets him die in the box, which is shown to be buried deep underground in a far away place.

== Cast ==
- Rahman as ACP Devendrakumar
- Gowri Nandha as Indrani
- Surendar Shanmugam as Surya
- Monica Chinnakotla as Kausalya
- Nizhalgal Ravi as Karthikeyan, Surya's father
- Sudha as Surya's mother
- Rajashree as Kausalya's mother
- Akhil as Surya's friend
- Boys Rajan as Commissioner Vijaya Sundaram
- Jeeva Ravi as John
- Kovai Senthil as Domestic worker
- V. M. Subburaj as Police constable
- Scissor Manohar as Police constable
- Sahana Shetty as Gayathri

== Production ==
The film's director Ram k Chandrran, this is filmy name his original name k. Ramaraj, one of the producer also in this movie, an erstwhile assistant to filmmakers Mahendran and Selvaraj, revealed that the film would focus on the dark side of advent of technology and would explore cyber crime. Pagadi Aattam completed its shoot by October 2015, with actor Rahman appearing as a police officer in the film. Following the shoot, the film was put on hold as it could not find a distributor.

The makers prepared the film for release in early 2017 following the success of Rahman's other project, Dhuruvangal Pathinaaru (2016), which had also featured him as a police officer. Rahman was subsequently featured as the centrepiece of the promotions, with the makers trying to bank on the similarity of his character to his previous film. However, the actor chose not to promote the film leading up to its release.

== Soundtrack ==
Pagadi Aattam

Soundtrack album by Karthik Raja
- Released: 2 February 2017
- Recorded: 2015–16
- Language: Tamil
- Label: Orange Music
- Producer: Karthik Raja

Karthik Raja chronology
Padaiveeran (2015)	Pagadi Aattam (2017)	Maadathy (2019)

The film's music was composed by Karthik Raja, while the audio rights of the film was acquired by Orange Music. The album released on 2 February 2017 and featured two songs.

Track list
No.	Title	Lyrics	Singer(s)	Length
1.	"Pookkal Methile"	Karthik Raja	Archana Nandakumar	1:40
2.	"Vachale Kaiye"	Vijay Saagar	Haricharan	3:28

== Release ==
The film opened on 17 February 2017 to mixed reviews, with the critic from The Times of India stating Pagadi Aattam is "partly inspired from the Hollywood flick Buried, the story and its execution falls flat" and that "the technical aspects, too, hardly offer anything to cheer about". The Deccan Chronicle stated it is a "movie which is watchable once" adding that "post interval it picks up momentum after the entry of Rahman". Giving a negative review, Indiaglitz.com stated "venture into this game at your own risk if only to receive some relevant messages for today's youth" and labelled the film as a "mess". The film took a low profile opening at the box office and went largely unnoticed.
