= Vaalmiki (film) =

2009 film by G. Anantha Narayanan

- Promotional Poster
- Directed by: G. Anantha Narayanan
- Produced by: Vikatan Talkies (P) Ltd.
- Starring: Akhil; Meera Nandan; Devika
- Cinematography: N Azhagappan
- Music by: Illayaraja
- Release date: 3 July 2009
- Language: Tamil

Vaalmiki is a 2009 Indian Tamil-language film directed by G. Anantha Narayanan, starring Akhil, Meera Nandan and Devika.

== Plot ==
Vaalmiki is the story of a petty thief, popularly known as Pickpocket Pandi. He does all the petty crimes for a living and he never regrets to steal, snatch and even rob. He loves his fairly happy-go-lucky lifestyle in the company of his friends. His antics always land him in prison. One day he meets a girl, Vandana, a well behaved, sweet-tempered girl. They are attracted to each other even though they have very little in common. A flower-seller Kanaka, forms the third angle. Whether Vandana reforms Pandi forms the climax.

== Cast ==
- Akhil as Pandi
- Meera Nandan as Vandana
- Devika as Kanaka
- Manivannan
- Badava Gopi

== Production ==
The film marked the directorial debut of Anantha Narayanan, who earlier assisted Shankar and Gandhi Krishna.

== Soundtrack ==
Valmiki

Film score by Ilaiyaraaja
- Genre: Feature film soundtrack
- Length: 24:48

The music was composed by Ilaiyaraaja and lyrics by Vaali. Behindwoods wrote "As usual, Ilayaraja’s music blends so delightfully with the lyrics". Milliblog wrote "Ilayaraja returns with a mixed bag in Valmiki; the better parts of the album amazingly outshine even his stupendous work in Azhagarmalai".

No.	Song	Singers	Lyrics
1	"Achadicha Kaasa..."	Ilaiyaraaja	Vaali
2	"Ennada Pandi..."	Ilaiyaraaja	Vaali
3	"Koodavaruviya..."	Bela Shende	Vaali
4	"Oli Tharum Sooriyan..."	Bela Shende, Ilaiyaraaja	Vaali
5	"Poo Sirikkuthu..."	Rita, Rahul Nambiar	Vaali
6	"Rekka Katti Parakthu..."	Tippu, Rahul Nambiar	Vaali
7	"Thendralum Maruthu..."	Shreya Ghosal	Vaali

== Release ==
The Times of India gave the film two out of five stars and wrote that "If only the director had gone the extra mile, the film would have been even more enjoyable". Rediff wrote "Though the screenplay is fairly logical, with Pandi's life changing slowly, there are moments when the moralising gets to you. The first half is racy, but post intermission, the pace slackens".
