= Thennavan (film) =

- Poster
- Directed by: A. M. Nandakumar
- Written by: A. M. Nandakumar; R. N. R. Manohar
- Produced by: L. K. Sudhish
- Starring: Vijayakanth; Kiran Rathod
- Cinematography: A. Ramesh Kumar
- Edited by: B. S. Vasu; Saleem
- Music by: Yuvan Shankar Raja
- Production company: Captain Cine Creations
- Release date: 15 August 2003
- Running time: 146 minutes
- Country: India
- Language: Tamil

Thennavan is a 2003 Indian Tamil-language political action film written and directed by newcomer A. M. Nandakumar and produced by Vijayakanth, who played the title role Thennavan IAS, in-charge as the Chief Election Commissioner and fights against corrupt politicians. The musical score was by Yuvan Shankar Raja. The film was released on 15 August 2003, coinciding with India's Independence Day.

== Plot ==
Thennavan (Vijayakanth) is an honest and upright IAS officer and he is handpicked by the Prime Minister of India to be the Chief Election Commissioner of India. His first assignment is conducting the Indian general election in Tamil Nadu and for the election, he suggests passing five laws in order to fix the electoral system. Thennavan quickly gains the support of the public. The current Chief Minister of Tamil Nadu Ilanthiraiyan (Nassar), a corrupt and greedy politician who wants to win the next election, successfully convinces the Prime Minister to not pass the five laws. In the meantime, Divya (Kiran Rathod) falls in love with Thennavan and tries to convince him to marry her.

To win the election, Ilanthiraiyan orders Mustafa (Thalaivasal Vijay) to plant a bomb during one of his public meetings. As he expected, the bomb kills many innocent people. Ilanthiraiyan blames his enemies to have planned it and gains sympathy from the voters. During the polls, Thennavan finds out about the sham and stops the vote counting. An angry Ilanthiraiyan takes the matter to court. In court, Thennavan provides uncontested evidence and the culprits including Ilanthiraiyan are sentenced to life imprisonment. Divya eventually marries her lover Thennavan.

With Ilanthiraiyan in jail, his naive wife Pushpalatha (Urvasi) replaces him as the new chief minister and bails him out of jail. Thennavan is then arrested but Pushpalatha makes him release due to public pressure. After a small quarrel with her husband, Pushpalatha resigns from her function and her government is dismissed by the governor. With the election campaign going on full swing, Thennavan resigns from his position. He then holds a public meet: he urges the voters to boycott the election to save the country from corrupt politicians and to stop people who will try to vote. The day of the election, not a single vote has been cast and it is well received by the public. The prime minister praises Thennavan for his achievement and accepts to pass the five laws.

== Cast ==
- Vijayakanth as Thennavan IAS
- Kiran Rathod as Divya, Thennavan's love interest
- Nassar as Ilanthiraiyan
- Urvasi as Pushpalatha
- Ravichandran as Azhagarsamy, Thennavan's father
- Vivek as Dada Mani
- Ponnambalam as Inspector Arumugam
- Sriman as Auto rickshaw driver
- Mansoor Ali Khan as S. R. S.
- Raj Kapoor as Politician
- Krishnamoorthy as Krishnamoorthy
- Laxmi Rattan as Divya's father
- Thyagu as Viswanathan
- Thalaivasal Vijay as Mustafa
- Jayamani as Pakkiri
- Thenali as Dada Mani's sidekick
- Chinrasu as Dada Mani's sidekick
- Benjamin as Dada Mani's sidekick
- LIC Narasimhan as Temple trustee
- Chelladurai as Politician
- Nellai Siva
- Set Govindaraj as Party member
- Mudhalvan Mahendran as Director general of police
- R. N. R. Manohar as Nagappa
- S. N. Lakshmi as Thennavan's grandmother
- Indhu as Thennavan's mother
- Rajini Nivetha as Servant
- Vijaya Singh as Divya's mother
- Minnal Deepa as Jeni
- Theni Kunjarammal as Old woman
- Kovai Senthil as Mani's father
- Vijay Ganesh as Village doctor
- Vijay Easwaran as Henchman
- Bobby as Henchman
- Bayilvan Ranganathan
- Auditor Sridhar as Government employee
- Siva Narayana Murthy as Police inspector
- S. Mani
- Sujibala as Nurse

== Production ==
The film was directed by debutant M. Nandakumar who has worked with directors like P. Vasu and Rajasekhar, this became his first film to release after his actual directorial debut Kodiesvaran remained unreleased. R. N. R. Manohar, dialogue writer of this film appeared in a small role as a gangster. Shooting for the film commenced in Chennai, and some fight scenes were picturised on top of highrise buildings like the Y.M.C.A and the Devi Theater, and on a set erected at the Prasad Studios. The hero and the unit at Prasad Studios had a surprise visitor cricketer Brian Lara. Lara had come for a friendly go-Kart competition and visited the sets to watch the shooting. Some scenes between the lead pair were picturised at the old Mahabalipuram road, while a song was picturised at sets erected at the AVM and Prasad Studios. Choreographed by Kala, the dance number had about a hundred dancers dancing around the lead pair. The song picturised at five sets, and shot with three cameras simultaneously, reportedly cost about Rs. 35 lakhs to picturise it. Yet another song was picturised with the lead pair at locations in and around Pollachi. Choreographed by Brinda, it took ten days to complete the picturisation. The fight scene between the hero and the jailor was filmed at Prasad Studios, where a lavish set of jail was erected at a cost of about Rs. 25 lakhs. While most of the shooting took place in Chennai and Pollachi, the unit also shot at locations in Jodhpur, Orissa and Visakhapatnam. For a single scene of a political meeting, about 5000 junior artistes were hired.

== Soundtrack ==
The music was composed by Yuvan Shankar Raja.

Track listing
No.	Title	Lyrics	Singer(s)	Length
1.	"Vatta Vatta"	Muthu Vijayan	Unni Menon, Padmalatha	4:12
2.	"Vinodhane"	Na. Muthukumar	Srinivas, Mahalakshmi Iyer	4:50
3.	"Dhesa Kaatre"	Pa. Vijay	Shankar Mahadevan, Ganga	4:13
4.	"Englishil Paadinaa"	Pa. Vijay	Malgudi Subha	4:01
5.	"Vinodhane" (version 2)	Na. Muthukumar	Srinivas, Srilekha Parthasarathy	4:49
6.	"Adi Saamy"	Snehan	S. P. Balasubrahmanyam, Sharmila	4:24

== Critical reception ==
Malathi Rangarajan of The Hindu wrote, "Thennavan would have been a tailor-made story for Vijayakanth but for the flawed script, clichéd dialogue and unappealing caricatures. Somewhere down the line, everyone from the director and the hero seems to have lost interest". Malini Mannath of Chennai Online wrote, "As for the debutant director, he seems to have seen some earlier Vijayakanth films - all the wrong ones - and taken his inspiration. And as for the hero, unless Vijayakanth does some serious rethinking, he's likely to lose the slight edge he has over his contemporaries".
