= Rain (2005 film) =

- Theatrical release poster
- Directed by: Amol Shetge
- Written by: Amol Shetge
- Produced by: Manju Bachchan; Vinod Bachchan
- Starring: see below
- Cinematography: Ishwar R. Bidri
- Edited by: Ashfaq Makrani
- Music by: Satish Ajay
- Production company: V. R. Entertainers
- Release date: 30 September 2005
- Running time: 129 minutes
- Country: India
- Language: Hindi

Rain is a 2005 Bollywood erotic-thriller film directed by Amol Shetge and produced by Vinod Bachchan under the banner of V. R. Entertainers. It features actors Meghna Naidu and Himanshu Malik in the lead roles. Satish–Ajay scored the music for the film.

== Plot ==
Sandhya Bhatnagar, a blind writer with a mysterious past, lives alone and has and a serious rain phobia. One day she is visited by a reporter named Prakash who is a fan of her novels. He pretends to be her psychiatrist and persuades her to reveal her past – she had an unhappy childhood and was gangraped as a teenager. Sandhya ends up falling in love with the reporter, however, it turns out that Prakash is actually the rapist who caused her misery in the first place.

== Cast ==
- Himanshu Malik as Prakash/Avinash
- Meghna Naidu as Sandhya Bhatnagar
- Panne Chatterjee as Avinash's wife
- Rajdev Jamdade
- Vijay Shukla

== Music ==
All lyrics are written by Praveen Bhardwaj; all music is composed by Satish–Ajay.

Rain (Original Motion Picture Soundtrack)
No.	Title	Artist(s)	Length
1.	"Badaloon Ki Ad Le Le"	Shreya Ghoshal, Udit Narayan	5:58
2.	"Mujhe Bhig Jane Do"	Sunidhi Chauhan	4:54
3.	"Kuch Bunde Tan Pe Giri" (Female Version)	Sunidhi Chauhan	4:33
4.	"Dhalne Lagi Shaam"	Kunal Ganjawala	5:52
5.	"Ye Dard Bada Bedardi"	Alka Yagnik	5:31
6.	"Kuch Bunde Tan Pe Giri" (Male Version)	Ajay Jaiswal	4:30
Total length:			31:18
