= 2000 Dharmapuri bus burning =

Bus burned by AIADMK cadres killing three people

- The Hindu photo
- Location: Ilakiyampatti, Dharmapuri, Tamil Nadu, India
- Date: 2 February 2000
- Target: Tamil Nadu Agricultural University bus passengers
- Attack type: Arson, mass murder
- Weapon: Petrol bomb
- Deaths: 3
- Injuries: 16
- Perpetrators: Muniappan, Nedunchezhian, Ravindran D.K. Rajendran and 24 other AIADMK members
- Motive: Protest against Jayalalithaa's conviction in the Pleasant Stay hotel case

The Dharmapuri bus burning occurred on 2 February 2000 in Ilakiyampatti, on the outskirts of Dharmapuri in Tamil Nadu, India. Three students from Tamil Nadu Agricultural University, Coimbatore (TNAU) were burned to death in a bus by AIADMK cadres after the conviction of Jayalalithaa by a special court for the Kodaikanal Pleasant Stay Hotel case. After this incident then Chief Minister M. Karunanidhi ordered a CB-CID investigation, and Jayalalithaa demanded a CBI probe to ensure a fair trial. The three men — Muniappan, Nedunchezhian, and Ravindran—were sentenced to death, and their sentences were initially upheld by the Supreme Court of India. Their sentences were later commuted to life imprisonment, however, by a three-member bench headed by Justice Ranjan Gogoi after a review petition. The Salem District Court had said that the crime was committed "only for the political career". Although defense lawyer L. Nageswara Rao admitted that the three culprits took petrol from a workshop, set fire to the bus and killed the students, they were "in a state of mob frenzy" and his defense was based on diminished responsibility.

The government advocated their release; the governor Banwarilal Purohit returned their files to the state government for reconsideration of their premature release and but it again sent to him and the three men all members were released from the Vellore Central Prison in November 2018.

== Background ==
Soon after coming to power in Tamil Nadu in 1996, the Dravida Munnetra Kazhagam (DMK) party filed a series of corruption cases against former chief minister and AIADMK general secretary Jayalalithaa and other ministers and bureaucrats in her government. In the Pleasant Stay hotel case, a special-court ruling by Justice V. Radhakrishnan convicted Jayalalithaa and sentenced her to one year of "rigorous imprisonment". The ruling led to statewide protests and violence, including damage to public property by AIADMK members. Protests in Elakiyampatti, Dharmapuri were led by AIADMK Dharmapuri Union Secretary D. K. Rajendran and other AIADMK party workers, including former Dharmapuri secretary Nedu (Nedunchezhiyan), MGR Forum functionary Madhu (Ravindran), and former panchayat president P. Muniappan.

== Burning ==
Seventy students from Tamil Nadu Agricultural University, returning from a study tour, were separated by gender on two buses. During their trip, they learned about Jayalalithaa's conviction in the Pleasant Stay hotel case. Latha (a lecturer accompanying the students) called TNAU's vice-chancellor, who recommended that they go to a safe place and return to Coimbatore when it was safer. They tried to drive to the district collector's office, but were unable to reach it due to traffic obstruction. The party workers threw petrol bombs into the bus containing 44 female students and two lecturers. The front of the bus caught fire, and the flames spread backward. Since the bus's back door was locked and the keys were unavailable, lecturers Latha, Akila, and several students left the other bus and broke through the back door to pull out the students. Three female students (Hemalatha from Chennai, V. Gayathri from Virudhachalam and Kokilavani from Namakkal) were burned to death, and 16 others were injured. The bus burning was broadcast the following day on Sun TV.

== Aftermath ==
By 6 November 2001, all eleven witnesses had become hostile during cross-examination in Krishnagiri. The witnesses included three Tamil Nadu State Transport Corporation drivers and people working in, or owning, establishments near the incident location. Drivers Saleem Basha of the Coimbatore-Hosur bus and Kamaraj recanted initial statements made to the CB-CID that they could identify the persons involved; they drove buses which were damaged that day in Erapatti and near the Patchaiamman temple, respectively.

The burning angered the student community. Schools and colleges were asked to close for a week, and students statewide held silent protest marches condemning the act. Chief Minister M. Karunanidhi ordered a CB-CID investigation, and Jayalalithaa demanded a CBI probe to ensure a fair trial. During the initial trial at Krishnagiri Court, 20 witnesses became hostile. N. P. Veerasamy, Kokilavani's father, appealed to the Madras High Court for a change of venue; AIADMK had returned to power in Tamil Nadu, the case prosecutor was appointed by the party, and the accused were AIADMK functionaries and party activists. The high court halted the trial; Judge V. Kanagaraj called it a "colossal failure and eyewash", and ordered a retrial at Salem Court. After a series of delays in appointing a special public prosecutor and problems with missing case bundles, the trial progressed. Seven years after the burning, on 15 February 2007, the Salem court sentenced three AIADMK members to death and 25 others to seven years' imprisonment. Two others were acquitted, and one died during the investigation. The judgment (including the three capital sentences) was upheld by Madras High Court on 6 December 2007, and the Supreme Court on 30 August 2010. However, the sentences were commuted to life imprisonment after defence lawyers L. Nageswara Rao and Sushil Kumar said that the AIADMK mob only aimed to damage buses, not kill; they had acted impulsively. The Supreme Court of India then accepted their argument of diminished responsibility. It was learned that Dharmapuri AIADMK leader D. K. Rajendran, the first suspect in the case which organized the road protest (with a seven-year conviction which was reduced to two years), held four positions in a cooperative milk society become known. Rajendran later resigned after the Madras High Court expressed "deep anguish and displeasure" that a convict could hold positions despite being disqualified. A granite memorial with the names of the three victims was built at the Tamil Nadu Agricultural University hostel; all were 20 years old at the time of their deaths.

The AIADMK-ruled Tamil Nadu government attempted to release the three suspects in the bus burning. According to prison sources, at least 1,500 prisoners would benefit from the government's general amnesty, which included the three convicts and was seen as a tactical move by the party. On 19 November 2018, the AIADMK members convicted in the bus burning were released. Veerasamy the father of Kokilavani one of the girls burnt alive criticized the release of the convicts and called it a "Murder of Justice".

== Case timeline ==
2000

On 2 February, AIADMK chief Jayalalithaa was sentenced by a special court to a one-year imprisonment for her role in the Kodaikanal Pleasant Stay hotel case. AIADMK protesters set fire to the Tamil Nadu Agricultural University bus. Three students were burned to death, and 16 others were injured. Tamil Nadu Chief Minister M. Karunanidhi ordered a CB-CID investigation, and Jayalalithaa insisted on a CBI probe. On 3 February, three AIADMK members and 25 others were convicted.

2001

Up to 20 witnesses turned hostile before the trial in Krishnagiri, and the Madras High Court transferred the case to Salem District Court. Missing case files and the appointment of a special prosecutor delayed the trial.

2007

The Salem court sentenced the three AIADMK men to death on 16 February, a verdict upheld by the Madras High Court on 6 December.

2010

On 30 August, the Supreme Court upheld the Madras High Court ruling.

2016

On 4 March, the three convicts filed a review petition in the Supreme Court seeking to commute their death sentences. Seven days later, the court commuted their sentences to life imprisonment.

2018

The Tamil Nadu government issued an orders to release over 1,600 long-time prisoners, including the Dharmapuri bus-burning convicts, on 1 February to mark the birth centenary of former Chief Minister M. G. Ramachandran (MGR). In October, the governor rejected the recommendation to release the three convicts. The following month, however, the Tamil Nadu government reiterated its recommendation to release the trio; the governor approved the recommendation this time, and they were released from Vellore Central Prison on 19 November.

== In popular culture ==
The Tamil language film Kalloori was released in December 2007, days before the Madras High Court upheld the Salem court judgment. The film's climax was the bus-burning incident and, after public and media demands, its ending was changed.
