= Hitudu =

Hithudu
- Movie Poster
- Directed by: Viplove
- Written by: Viplove
- Produced by: KSV
- Starring: Jagapati Babu; Meera Nandan
- Cinematography: Bharani K. Dharan
- Edited by: Dharmendra Kakarala
- Music by: Koti
- Production company: KSV Films
- Release date: 11 December 2015
- Country: India
- Language: Telugu

Hithudu (transl. Well Wisher) is a 2015 Telugu-language philosophy film, produced by KSV on KSV Films banner and directed by Viplove. The film stars Jagapati Babu Meera Nandan in pivotal roles and the music composed by Koti.

The film won Nandi Award for Third Best Feature Film for the year 2014.

== Cast ==
- Jagapati Babu as Sita Ram
- Meera Nandan as Abhilasha
- Banerjee
- Anoojram
- C. V. L. Narasimha Rao
- Laxman Meesala

== Soundtrack ==
Hitudu

Film score by Koti
- Released: 2015
- Genre: Soundtrack
- Length: 24:23
- Label: Aditya Music
- Producer: Koti

Koti chronology
Onamalu (2012)	Hitudu (2015)	Mama Manchu Alludu Kanchu (2015)

Music was composed by Koti and released by ADITYA Music Company. Lyrics were written by Ananta Sriram.

No.	Title	Singer(s)	Length
1.	"Chinni Chinni"	Sravana Bhargavi	4:39
2.	"Epudu Nee Dyaase"	Shruthi	5:32
3.	"Chedugudu Koothalu"	Shiva	4:39
4.	"Navvali Navvali"	Hemachandra	5:06
5.	"Nagumomu"	Lakshmi Gayatri	4:18
Total length:			24:23
