= Classic – Dance of Love =

2005 film by Babbar Subhash

- Directed by: Babbar Subhash
- Written by: Babbar Subhash
- Produced by: Babbar Subhash
- Starring: Mithun Chakraborty; Vikas Bharadwaj; Meghna Naidu; Naveen Nischol
- Cinematography: Manoj Gupta
- Edited by: Arun
- Music by: Bappi Lahiri; Sukhwinder Singh
- Distributed by: B. Subhash Movie Unit
- Release date: 18 March 2005
- Running time: 145 minutes
- Country: India
- Language: Hindi

Classic – Dance of Love is a 2005 Hindi-language Indian film directed by Babbar Subhash, starring Mithun Chakraborty, Vikas Bhardwaj and Meghna Naidu, with Shashi Kiran and Navin Nischol featuring in supporting roles.

== Plot ==
Guru, Dr. Ram Gopal Acharya (preacher), teaches his disciples the core difference between paap (sin) and punya (good deeds). One of his life's thinkings is that man should never succumb to temptation and sex to "sinners," and women's only responsibility is to seduce men for money and ultimately destroy them.

Doli, the bar dancer, dances to entertain her customer, drawing false visions of lust and arousing passion in men through her sensual figure movements, keeping the dream that some day her Prince Charming, riding on a white horse, would come and take her away. Meanwhile, she meets Suraj, a London-based NRI who comes to India for business. Love blossoms between the two, and Suraj transforms Doli from a symbol of disgrace into a symbol of pure and noble love.

But unfortunately, Dr. Acharya's loyalty, rather better to tell the wicked side of him, towards his friend J. K. Malhotra, father of Suraj, evokes to insult Doli and calls her a prostitute, sinner, lady of the night, and adulteress, and blames her for tarnishing Suraj's reputation. Fatigued, Doli finds no way other than the decision to take refuge in Acharya's ashram. A victorious smile cures his lips, as Acharya cannot resist the lure, the forbidden joy of passion, which he always condemned—sex.

Doli gradually realises Dr. Acharya's lustful intention to his disciples. Suraj rescues Doli from the evil clutches of Acharya as he tries to forcefully marry her. His heart is set on fire with the longing for Doli, and his feet begin to quiver to the tune of wild romance, sex, and passion performing this story.

== Cast ==
- Mithun Chakraborty as Dr. Ramgopal Acharya
- Vikas Bhardwaj as Suraj J. Malhotra
- Meghna Naidu as Doli
- Krishna Bhatt
- Dinesh Hingoo as Sitara's assistant
- Shashi Kiran as Sadanand
- Vivek Mishran
- Navin Nischol as J. K. Malhotra
- Gyan Prakash
- Mansee Shah
- Himani Shivpuri as Sitaradevi

== Songs ==
1. "Mohabbat Hojaye" - Sukhwinder Singh
2. "Classic Dance Of Love" - Sukhwinder Singh
3. "Saathi Mere" - Kailash Kher
4. "Main Tujhpe Qurbaan" - Sukhwinder Singh
5. "Saiyaji" - Shreya Ghoshal
6. "Aa Mujhe Dekh" - Sunidhi Chauhan
