= Irresistible impulse =

Insanity defence

In criminal law, irresistible impulse is a defense by excuse, in this case some sort of insanity, in which the defendant argues that they should not be held criminally liable for their actions that broke the law, because they could not control those actions, even if they knew them to be wrong. It was added to the M'Naghten rule as a basis for acquittal in the mid 20th century.

In 1994, Lorena Bobbitt was found not guilty when her defense argued that an irresistible impulse led her to cut off her husband's penis.

The Penal Code of the U.S. state of California states (2002), "The defense of diminished capacity is hereby abolished ... there shall be no defense of ... diminished responsibility or irresistible impulse..."

The "policeman at the elbow" test is a test used by some courts to determine whether the defendant was insane when they committed a crime. It is a variant of the M'Naghten Rules that addresses the situation in which the defendant knew that what they were going to do was wrong, but had no ability to restrain themself from doing it. The test asks whether they would have done what they did even if a police officer were standing at their elbow, hence its name.

== Irresistible impulse in English law ==
In English law the concept of "irresistible impulse" was developed in the 1960 case R v. Byrne. The appellant (described as a violent sexual psychopath) strangled and mutilated a young woman; it was alleged that Byrne suffered from violent and perverted sexual desires which he found impossible to control. Lord Parker C.J. broadened the definition of "abnormality of mind" to include those lacking "the ability to exercise will-power to control acts in accordance with [their] rational judgment".

"Irresistible impulse" can be pleaded only under the defense of diminished responsibility, not under the defense of insanity. Thus it operates only as a partial defence to murder, reducing the charge to manslaughter, and giving the judge discretion as to length of sentence and whether committal would be more appropriate than incarceration.

== See also ==
- Impulse control disorder
- Anatomy of a Murder
