= Mohammed Khadeer Babu =

Indian writer

- ముహమ్మద్ ఖదీర్ బాబు
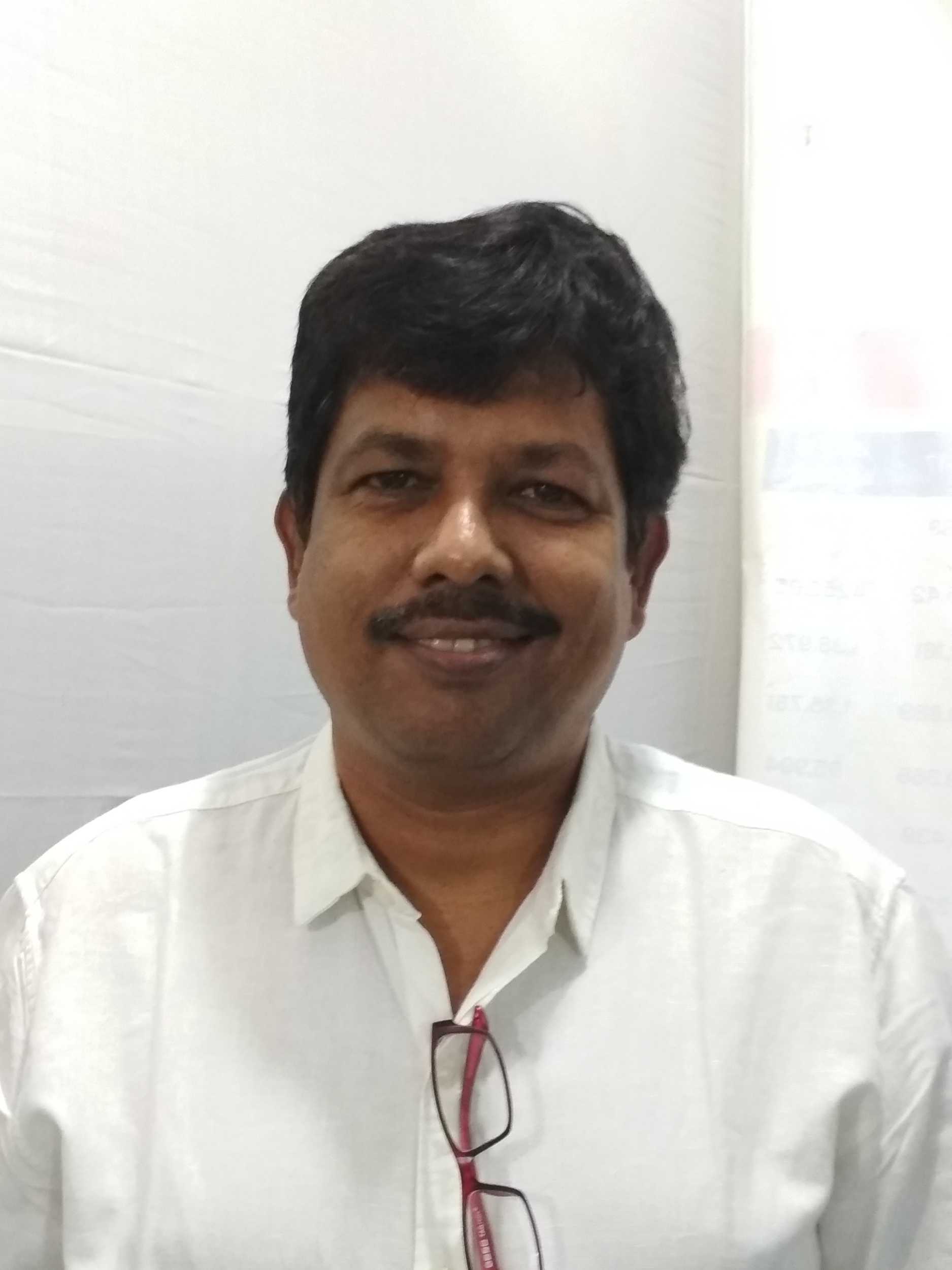
- Khadeer babu at Vijayawada book festival 2018
- Born: Kavali
- Occupation: Journalist
- Spouse: Mohammed Shabeena
- Writing career
- Language: Telugu
- Genres: Children literature, fictional short stories
- Notable works: Dargamitta kathalu Poleramma banda kathalu Puppujaan kathalu New Bombay tailors Beyond Coffee; Bollywood classics Man chahe geet Noorella Telugu Katha; Kathalu Ilaa Kooda Raastaaru; Metro Kathalu

Mohammad Khadeer Babu (born April 28, 1972) is a Telugu short story writer, journalist, editor, and Telugu film scriptwriter from India. He is known for his unique narrative style, which often uses the regional dialect of the Nellore district and reflects the culture and traditions of the Muslim community, frequently intertwining humor and pathos.

== Childhood and early life ==
Mohammad Khadeer Babu was born in a middle class Muslim family to Mohammed Kareem and Sartaj Begum on April 28, 1972, in Kavali, a town in the Nellore district of Andhra Pradesh. He was born into a middle-class Muslim family. He studied B.Sc. Computer Science at Jawahar Bharati College.

== Career ==
His writing career began in 1995 with the short story 'Pushpaguchham' (The Bouquet) published in the Andhra Jyothy weekly magazine. The subsequent loss of his father in 1996 and the new responsibilities it brought, gave him a deeper understanding of life, which significantly influenced his decision to write more stories, starting with 'Dawat' in 1997.

=== As short story writer ===
His short stories Dargamitta Kathalu and Polerammabanda Kathalu are known for their nativity and regional dialect. Being a Muslim, his stories reflect the traditions and culture of Muslim community. The stories in these two volumes are the childhood experiences of the writer narrated from the point of view of a child. The real beauty of the stories lies in the way the writer narrates the incidents using the regional dialect without losing his grip on the childhood innocence which gives a realistic picture of the life. This aspect makes the audience look into the details of the life lived by the writer and his family which the child himself is hardly aware of. This spirit in the story makes humour and pathos run hand in hand in the story. New Bombay Tailors, Phuppujaan Kathalu, Beyond Coffee, Metro Kathalu, Zero Blood are his other major works.

=== As Movie script writer ===
As a movie script writer, Khadeer babu has written dialogues for Onamalu, Brahmotsavam, Manamantha.

=== Other Literary Contributions ===
- His stories like "Head Curry" have been translated into English, Hindi, and Urdu. The story collection New Bombay Tailors earned him the Charles Wallace Fellowship from the University of Edinburgh, UK, making him the first from South India to receive this fellowship for a story collection.
- He was an organiser of Writers' Meet conventions for over 25 years, starting in 2001.
- His short story compilation of Dargamitta Kathalu and Polerammabanda Kathalu has been translated into English by DV Subhashri as That's A Fire Ant Right There

== Adaptations ==
Mohammad Khadeer Babu's literary works have been adapted for both the stage and screen.

=== Theatrical Adaptations (Plays) ===
- 'New Bombay Tailors' (Telugu): His story collection New Bombay Tailors was adapted into a play in Telugu and successfully staged as a ticket show across Andhra Pradesh and Telangana.
- 'Bombay Tailors' (Malayalam): The same work was also translated and adapted into a play in the Malayalam language and performed as a ticketed show in Kerala, Singapore, and Dubai, demonstrating its reach beyond the Telugu-speaking regions.

=== Screen Adaptations (Film and Web Series) ===
- 'Metro Stories' (Web Anthology): His short story collection 'Metro Kathalu' was adapted into the first-ever Telugu web anthology, titled 'Metro Stories,' released on the Aha OTT platform.
- 'Oka Vantu' (Short Film): The short story 'Oka Vantu' was adapted into a short film named 'Pranathi,' which was released on YouTube.

== Film and Media Career ==
=== Film Scriptwriter ===
Khadeer Babu has contributed to the Telugu film industry as a script and dialogue writer.

1. Onamalu (2012)
2. Brahmotsavam
3. Manamantha

=== OTT and Digital Media ===
1. He was the scriptwriter for the first Telugu web anthology, 'Metro Stories,' released on the Aha platform, based on his book Metro Kathalu.
2. He wrote 'Ippudu Vistunna Gaali,' credited as the first literary web column in Telugu, featuring introductions to 50 literary figures on Nihar Online (2000–2001).

== Awards and honors ==
Mohammad Khadeer Babu has received numerous awards for his literary contributions, including:

1. Katha Award, Delhi (twice: for 'Jameen' story in 1998 and 'New Bombay Tailors' story in 2000).
2. Bhasha Samman Puraskar (Indian Institute of Indian Languages, Mysore – 2004).
3. Ravi Sastri Puraskaram (2005).
4. Chaso Puraskaram (2006).
5. Akkineni Cinema Award and Bharatamuni Award (for dialogues in Onamalu – 2012).
6. Madabhushi Rangacharyulu Award (2015).
7. Madhurantakam Rajaram 'Katha Kokila' Puraskaram (2016).
8. K.N.Y. Patanjali Puraskaram (2018).
9. Gidugu Ramamurthy Pantulu Bhasha Puraskaram (Telugu Academy, Andhra Pradesh).
10. YSR Excellence Award (Government of Andhra Pradesh – 2023).
