= Kizhakku Karai =

- Poster
- Directed by: P. Vasu
- Written by: P. Vasu
- Produced by: Mohan Natarajan; V. Shanmugam
- Starring: Prabhu; Khushbu
- Cinematography: Ravindar
- Edited by: P. Mohanraj
- Music by: Deva
- Production company: Sree Rajakaali Amman Enterprises
- Release date: 20 September 1991
- Running time: 140 minutes
- Country: India
- Language: Tamil

Kizhakku Karai (transl. East Shore) is a 1991 Indian Tamil-language crime film written and directed by P. Vasu. The film stars Prabhu and Khushbu. It was released on 20 September 1991.

== Plot ==
Sekhar and Murali are best friends. Murali sacrifices his job opportunity for his friend, thus Sekhar becomes a customs officer. Thereafter, Murali returns to his native village. His cousin Mahalakshmi falls in love with him.

Ranganathan, Murali's father, works for a smuggler named Daaha for twenty-five years. When Murali discovers his father's profession, he convinces him to quit his job. Finally, Ranganathan decides to leave this odd job but Daaha kills him for fear of reprisal. Murali decides to take revenge and becomes a smuggler as well.

== Cast ==
- Prabhu as Murali
- Khushbu as Mahalakshmi
- Chandrasekhar as Sekhar
- Goundamani as Raja (Jacky)
- Vijayakumar as Ranganathan, Murali's father
- Srividya as Janaki, Murali's mother
- Vennira Aadai Moorthy as Raja's father
- Manimala as Mill Manager
- Mohan Natarajan as Inspector Kumar
- Rocky as Michael
- K. Rajpreeth as Daaha
- Oru Viral Krishna Rao as Lodge manager
- LIC Narasimhan as Dhayanatham Minister
- King Kong as Foreign Palli
- Uday Prakash as Murali Partners
- G. M. Sundar as Murali Partners
- Dileep as Murali Partners
- Veera Pandiyan as Murali Partners
- Perumal
- Radhakrishnan
- Varalakshmi as Raja's mother
- Babitha as Mary
- Sharmili
- Baby Jennifer as Murali's and Mahalakshmi's son

== Soundtrack ==
The soundtrack was composed by Deva, with lyrics written by Vaali.

Song	Singer(s)	Duration
"Enakenna Perandhava"	S. P. Balasubrahmanyam, K. S. Chithra	4:23
"Sannadhi Vaasalil Vandhadhu"	S. P. Balasubrahmanyam	4:55
"Selu Selu Seluvena Kaathu"	K. S. Chithra	4:50
"Nandhavanam Endhamanam"	S. P. Balasubrahmanyam, S. A. Seeni Muhammed	5:05
"Ediosaigal Ketkattum"	S. P. Balasubrahmanyam	4:46

== Reception ==
N. Krishnaswamy of The Indian Express stated, "The narrative does not roll credibly, the camera work is mediocre and Deva has scored a few sweet numbers" but he praised actor K. Rajpreeth's performance and the climax's message.
