= TANSI land acquisition case =

1991–96 case in Tamil Nadu, India

- Date: 10 June 1999
- Location: Chennai
- Participants: J. Jayalalithaa, V. K. Sasikala, T.R. Srinivasan, Mohammed Asif, S. Nagarajan, R. Karpoorasundarapandian
- Charges: Misuse of office, Corruption, Criminal conspiracy
- Verdict: Supreme Court: Acquitted of all charges, High Court: Acquitted of all charges Trial Court: Two year rigorous and ₹50,000 fine for all six.Land returned to TANSI
- Convictions: High Court: none; Trial Court: 6
- Litigation: 7 years

Participants
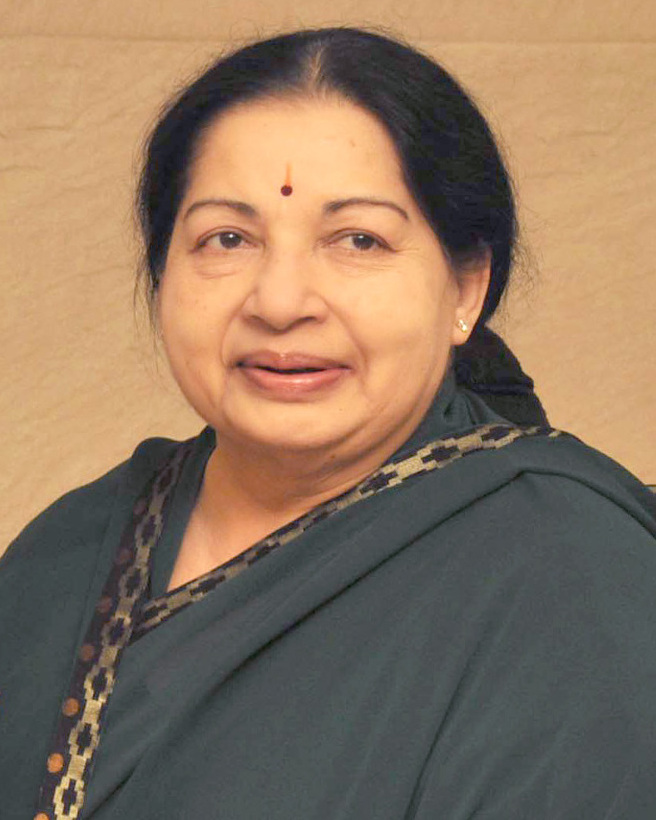
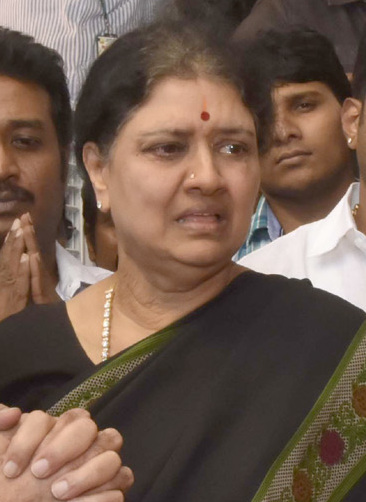
J.Jayalalithaa (pictured left) V. K. Sasikala (right).

TANSI land acquisition case (or TANSI case) was a sensational case against J. Jayalalithaa in Tamil Nadu, during 1991-96. Jaya Publication and Sasi Enterprises, the companies in which J. Jayalalithaa and her associate V. K. Sasikala had holdings, purchased lands of Tamil Nadu Small Industries Corporation (TANSI), a state government agency, in 1992. The case was filed by Subramanian Swamy and chargesheet were filed during the following DMK (Dravida Munnetra Kazhagam) government headed by M. Karunanidhi in 1996. Jayalalitha and her associate, Sasikala were convicted in the lower court, which sentenced her to two year rigorous imprisonment and fined ₹50,000 on 9 October 2000. The case had political implications as Jayalalithaa was disqualified from contesting the 2001 Tamil Nadu Legislative Assembly election. Though Jayalalithaa's nomination papers were rejected, she took oath as chief minister after the victory of AIADMK in the elections. The Supreme Court disqualified her in September 2001, resulting in her stepping down and elevation of O. Panneerselvam as the chief minister. The governor of Tamil Nadu, Fathima Beevi, who administered oath to J. Jayalalithaa, was advised to step down by the union ministry, who also sent the report to the President of India.

The Madras High Court acquitted her and other five accused in the case of all the charges on 4 December 2001. The Supreme Court upheld the order of Madras High Court on 24 November 2003 on grounds of lack of evidence. She came back to power winning the 2002 Tamil Nadu assembly by-election from Andipatti constituency in March 2002.Jayalalithaa returned the land to TANSI as per a Supreme Court Judgement in 2008.

== Background ==
Jayalalithaa Jayaram (24 February 1948-05 December 2016), commonly referred to as J. Jayalalithaa, was an Indian politician and six time Chief Minister of Tamil Nadu during various times from 24 June 1991 – 12 May 1996, 14 May 2001 – 21 September 2001, 2 March 2002 – 12 May 2006, 16 May 2011 – 27 September 2014, 23 May 2015 – 05 December 2016. Jaya Publication and Sasi Enterprises, the companies in which Jayalalithaa and Sasikala had holdings, purchased lands of Tamil Nadu Small Industries Corporation (TANSI), a state government agency, in 1992. The companies bought 3 acres (1.2 ha) land and building belonging to TANSI, which was quoted to be ₹35 crores less than the market price. The chargesheet filed during 1996 stated that the purchase of foundry property caused a loss of ₹2.28 crores and enamel wire factory caused a loss of ₹58.8 lakh to the state exchequer.

== Trial ==
The case was filed by Subramanian Swamy in the Madras trial court. The trial court framed charges against her and five others on 10 June 1999. The Madras Court discharged her from the case on 13 January 2000, but based on the leave petition filed by the state government, the court ordered her to face the trial. She was convicted of criminal conspiracy by the trial court on 9 October 2000, sentencing her to two year rigorous imprisonment in the two cases and fined ₹50,000. She was sentenced under Sections 120-B (for punishment of criminal conspiracy) and 409 (for criminal breach of trust by public servant or by banker, merchant or agent) of the Indian Penal Code (IPC) and Sections 13 (2) and 13 (1)(c) and (d) of the Prevention of Corruption Act (PCA). While Jayalalithaa and Sasikala were sentenced as the first and second accused, four others, namely, the former Chairman and Managing Director of TANSI T.R. Srinivasan, former Rural Industries Minister Mohammed Asif, former Special Deputy Collector (Stamps) S. Nagarajan and Jayalalitha's former Additional Secretary R. Karpoorasundarapandian, were sentenced to two years rigorous imprisonment and levied a fine of ₹10,000 each in the Jaya Publications case. The six were sentenced in the Sasi Enterprises case as well and similar sentence was awarded. In November 2000, the Madras Court stayed the conviction, but still debarred her from contesting the state assembly elections in 2001.

== Political implications ==
Supreme Court judgement

Good ethical behaviour on the part of those who are in power is the hallmark of a good administration and people in public life must perform in a spirit of public service rather than by assuming power to indulge in callous cupidity regardless of self imposed discipline. Irrespective of the fact whether we reach the conclusion that Jayalalithaa is guilty of the offences with which she is charged or not, she must atone for the same not only by returning the property to TANSI unconditionally but also ponder over whether she had done the right thing in breaching the spirit of Code of Conduct and take steps to expiate herself

— ~ Supreme Court judgement, 24 November 2003

The AIADMK party swept the poll in 2001 and though she was disqualified from contesting, she was sworn in as the Chief Minister. There was an appeal in Supreme Court against her appointment as Chief minister quoting a convicted person cannot hold government office. K. Venugopal appeared as counsel for Jayalalithaa and Sasikala, while Venkatapathy acted as the public prosecutor. While the prosecutor sought further time to study the case, the court went ahead with the hearing of the appellate. K. Venugopal argued that there was no impropriety with Jayalalithaa continuing as Chief minister as it was a large scale people's mandate that wanted her as the chief minister. On 21 September 2001, a five member bench of the Supreme Court ordered that a disqualified person cannot hold office of the Chief minister. The judges quoted that people's mandate cannot overrule constitution. The governor of Tamil Nadu, Fathima Beevi, who administered oath to Jayalalithaa, was advised to step down by the union ministry, who also sent the report to the President of India. It was a rare case of a constitutional functionary being removed from power for omission of duties. She resigned before she could be called back by the central government on 1 July 2001 and her resignation was accepted and C. Rangarajan, the then governor of neighbouring state Andhra Pradesh was given additional charge as governor of Tamil Nadu.

Following the disqualification of Jayalalithaa as Chief minister, media reported various front runners for the post. There were no clear names emerging. Subsequently, at a meeting of AIADMK, O. Panneerselvam was chosen as the Chief Minister of Tamil Nadu.

On 4 December 2001, the Madras High Court acquitted her of all the charges on the TANSI land acquisition. She contested the Andipatti assembly constituency and was sworn-in again as the Chief Minister. The Supreme Court reserved the orders of the lower court against the leave petition filed by DMK party counsel against the lower court verdict. Subramaniya Swami appealed against her acquittal in the lower court in the Supreme Court of India, which again acquitted her from the two cases on 24 November 2003 ruling that though there is strong suspicion about her involvement in the case, there was no legal evidence to prove her guilt. The judge also ordered "She must atone her conscience in the whole controversy". It was later reported that she returned the land to the agency at throwaway price.

== Aftermath ==
Jayalalithaa came back to power winning the 2002 Tamil Nadu assembly by-election from Andipatti constituency. Politicians believe that the outcome of the case along with the other cases filed by the DMK government against her resulted in a political vendetta between the ruling AIADMK and the opposition DMK parties. After assuming power, the Jayalalithaa government filed a slew of corruption cases against the DMK government ministers who were in office from 1996 - 2001. Karunanidhi, the leader of DMK and ex-chief minister was arrested in an alleged flyover construction scam. The arrest created a controversy in the state as the videotapes of the arrest were telecast live by Sun TV, the channel run by Karunanidhi's nephew. The ruling AIADMK government also transferred all the officials who were seen close to the previous government.

== Timeline ==
- 15 November 1996 - Chargesheet filed against Jayalalithaa and all the accused in the case
- 10 June 1999 - Charges framed against the six accused in the case
- 13 January 2000 - Supreme Court orders Jayalalithaa to face trial
- 9 October 2000 - Chennai trial court convicts Jayalalithaa to three years imprisonment and two years rigorous with a fine of ₹50,000
- November 2000 - Madras High Court stays the verdict and not the sentence, preventing Jayalalithaa from contesting Assembly polls
- May 2001 - AIADMK led by Jayalalithaa sweeps polls (earlier Jayalilathaa disqualified from contesting)
- 14 May 2001 - Jayalalithaa assumes office amid controversy. Governor Fathima Beevi administers oath of confidence.
- 1 July 2001 - Fathima Beevi, the then governor of Tamil Nadu resigns after being asked to step down by the union ministry.
- 21 September 2001 - Supreme Court disqualifies Jayalalithaa
- 4 December 2001 - Madras High Court acquits Jayalalithaa of all her charges in the two cases.
- March 2002 - Jayalalithaa becomes the Chief Minister of Tamil Nadu.
- 24 November 2003 - Supreme Court of India upholds the verdict of High Court.
