= Padaiveeran =

- Directed by: Dhana
- Written by: Dhana
- Produced by: Madhivanan
- Starring: Vijay Yesudas; Amritha Aiyer; Bharathiraja; Akhil
- Cinematography: Rajavel Mohan Ashokkumar ( 1 song )
- Edited by: Bhuvan Srinivasan
- Music by: Karthik Raja
- Production company: Evoke
- Release date: February 2, 2018
- Country: India
- Language: Tamil

Padaiveeran (transl. Soldier) is a 2018 Indian Tamil-language drama film written and directed by Dhana. The film stars Vijay Yesudas and debutant Amritha Aiyer, with Bharathiraja and Akhil in supporting roles. The film features music composed by Karthik Raja, editing by Bhuvan Srinivasan, and cinematography by Rajavel Mohan. Padaiveeran was released on 2 February 2018.

== Plot ==
The film is based on a true story.

Set in modern times in a rural village in Theni in south India, the film portrays communal riots due to caste. Muneeshwaran (Vijay Yesudas) is a young jobless man who spends all his time with his like-minded friends, roaming around in the village with no purpose in life. One day, while Muneesh is accompanying an old lady to the police station, he learns that the villagers have high regard for cops, as they earn easy money and get free liquor. Before leaving, he promises his childhood sweetheart Malar (Amritha Aiyer) in the village that he will complete the training and marry her. Muneesh's uncle Krishnan (Bharathiraja), a retired army officer, helps Muneesh get entry into the police force by bribing the higher officials. Muneesh finds it tough at the training camp and even runs away halfway through to his village. However, his seniors manage to track him down and forcefully bring him back to camp. Eventually, Muneesh completes his training and becomes a police officer.

While Muneesh is away at camp, his widowed cousin is killed by his own relatives after her family finds out that she is in love with a young man from another caste who has made plans to elope with her. The man is brutally murdered, as well, prompting violent retaliation from members of the rival clan, leading to a caste war. As part of his first duty as a police officer, Muneesh is posted to his village to control the communal riots, which are fueled by one of his own uncles. Muneesh has to choose between staying loyal to his duties or his caste. He then joins forces with his superior Selvam (Akhil) and arrests all those who were involved in the deadly riots, including his own uncle and cousins. However, all of them were released on bail.

In the end, both leaders of the rival clans promise to make peace in order for the annual temple festival to be held. Muneesh attends the festival to ensure that his uncle and cousins do not cause any problems. However, they throw petrol on Muneesh and set him on fire. Krishnan and Malar try to save Muneesh but are stopped by the other villagers, who feel that Muneesh has betrayed their clan. The burning Muneesh forcefully hugs his own uncle, who was the leader of his caste gang, and both of them die. Later, a drunk Krishnan is seen erecting a memorial stone at Muneesh's burial site.

== Cast ==
- Vijay Yesudas as Constable Muneeshwaran
- Amritha Aiyer as Malar, Muneesh's love interest
- Bharathiraja as Krishnan, a retired army officer and Muneesh's uncle
- Akhil as Selvam, Muneesh's superior
- Manoj Kumar as Muneesh's father
- Appukutty as Muneesh's friend
- Singampuli as Bartender
- Mahanadi Shankar
- Nitish Veera as Ammasi, Muneesh's friend
- Kavitha Bharathy
- Vijaibalaji

== Production ==
In May 2016, Dhana Sekaran, an erstwhile assistant of Mani Ratnam announced that he would make his directorial debut with a film starring Vijay Yesudas and Bharathiraja. Bharathiraja agreed to work on the film, alongside his commitments for Kutra Parambirai, but later delayed the other venture. The film began filming in Theni later that month.

The film's first look was released by actor Arvind Swamy in February 2017, with the makers revealing that Akhil and actress Amritha Aiyer had also joined the cast. Amritha Aiyer had been chosen after the director was impressed with her performance in a short film she had worked on, and also worked on Kiruthiga Udhayanidhi's Kaali (2018) before the release of Padaiveeran. Vijay Yesudas held a screening of the film for his friend, Dhanush, during September 2017. After seeing the film, Dhanush appreciated the team's work and offered to sing a song to help expand the film's reach. Final patchwork and the new song was shot was completed in November 2017, with Dhanush visiting the sets of the film to see his song "Local Sarakka Foreign Sarakka" being shot.

== Release ==
The satellite rights of the film were sold to Zee Tamil.

== Soundtrack ==
Padaiveeran

Soundtrack album by Karthik Raja
- Released: 22 April 2015
- Recorded: 2015–18
- Genre: Film soundtrack
- Length: 27:58
- Language: Tamil
- Label: U1 Records

Karthik Raja chronology
Sagaptham (2015)	Padaiveeran (2015)	Pagadi Aattam (2017)

The film's music was composed by Karthik Raja, and the album was produced by Yuvan Shankar Raja's U1 Records label. The audio was launched in April 2015 by directors Mani Ratnam and Mysskin. After the release of the album, a further song "Local Sarakka Foreign Sarakka" sung by Dhanush was added to the album in November 2017.

No.	Title	Writer(s)	Singer(s)	Length
1.	"Mattikkitten"	Dhana	Rita Thyagarajan, Haricharan	3:08
2.	"Ithuvarai Naan (Male)"	Dhana	Yuvan Shankar Raja	3:58
3.	"Ithuvarai Naan (Female)"	Priyan	Chinmayi	3:58
4.	"Inaiye Inaiye"	Dhana	Vijay Yesudas	2:39
5.	"Kombadhi Kombanada"	Mohan Rajan	Mukesh Mohamed	3:02
6.	"Left Right"	Dhana	Karthik Raja, Dhana Sekaran	2:04
7.	"Hkkumtada"	Dhana	Vijay Yesudas	1:33
8.	"Theera Nadhi"	Dhana	Prithvi	3:05
9.	"Local Sarakka Foreign Sarakka"	Priyan	Dhanush	4:32
