= Onamalu =

- Movie Poster
- Directed by: Kranthi Madhav
- Screenplay by: Kranthi Madhav
- Story by: Potluri Satyanarayana; Madhukuri Raja
- Produced by: Kranthi Madhav
- Starring: Rajendra Prasad; Kalyani
- Cinematography: Hari Anumolu
- Edited by: Gautham Raju
- Music by: Koti
- Production company: Sunshine Cinema
- Release date: 27 June 2012
- Running time: 121 mins
- Country: India
- Language: Telugu

Onamalu (transl. Alphabet) is a 2012 Telugu-language philosophical film, produced & directed by Kranthi Madhav on Sunshine Cinema banner. Starring Rajendra Prasad, Kalyani and music composed by Koti. The film premiered on 22 June 2012. The film is a debut for director Kranthi Madhav's into the film industry and known Telugu literary personality Mohd Khadeer Babu first time penned dialogue for the film. The film received CineMAA Awards for Best debut Director and Best outstanding Actor.

== Cast ==
- Rajendra Prasad as Narayana Rao Master
- Kalyani as Rukmini
- Chalapathi Rao as President
- Giri Babu as Peddi Raju
- Chandra Mohan as Ram Babu
- Brahmanandam as Balaraju
- Raghu Babu as Erramanjil
- Kondavalasa as Military Chowdary
- Praveen as Sundaram
- Ravi Prakash as Khadar
- Bhupal Raju as Chitti Raju
- Ananth as Mangapati Master
- Jenny
- Sasidhar as Venkatesh
- Sarika Ramachandra Rao as Cyclone Subba Rao
- Chitti as Rama Krishna
- Siva Parvathi as Mahalakshmi
- Meena as Nazhira
- Maheswari as Sarala
- Poornima
- Bhavani as Lata
- Goparaju Ramana

== Soundtrack ==
Onamalu

Film score by Koti
- Released: 2011
- Genre: Soundtrack
- Length: 19:17
- Label: Aditya Music
- Producer: Koti

Koti chronology
Aha Naa Pellanta (2011)	Onamalu (2011)	Hitudu (2015)

Music composed by Koti. Lyrics were written by Sirivennela Sitarama Sastry. Music released on ADITYA Music Company.

No.	Title	Singer(s)	Length
1.	"Sooridu"	Koti	3:41
2.	"Arudhaina"	Sri Krishna	3:10
3.	"Pandugante"	Krishna Chaitanya, Chaitra	3:32
4.	"Hey Yamma"	Malavika	2:02
5.	"Pillalu Baagunnara"	Nitya Santoshini	6:56
Total length:			19:17

== Awards 2012 ==
CineMAA Awards

- CineMAA Award for Best Debut Director - Kranthi Madhav
- CineMAA Award for Best Outstanding Actor - Rajendra Prasad
- Chennai Telugu Academy Awards - Kranthi Madhav - Best Feature Film
- Santosham Awards- Kranthi Madhav- Best Feature Film
- ANR - Abhinandana Awards - Best Feature Film, Best Debut Director - Kranthi Madhav
- Bharatamuni Awards - Best Message Oriented Film, Best Debut Director - Kranthi Madhav

Nandi Awards

- Nandi Award for Best Male Comedian - Raghu Babu
