= Kalkandu =

2014 Indian film by A. M. Nandakumar

- Directed by: A. M. Nandakumar
- Produced by: J. Mahalakshmi
- Starring: Gajesh; Dimple Chopade; Akhil
- Cinematography: K. V. Suresh
- Edited by: Suresh Urs
- Music by: Kannan
- Production company: Rajarathinam Films
- Release date: 31 October 2014
- Country: India
- Language: Tamil

Kalkandu (lit. 'Rock candy') is a 2014 Indian Tamil film written and directed by A. M. Nandakumar. The film features Gajesh and Dimple Chopade in the lead roles, and was released in October 2014.

== Plot synopsis ==
A demanding father pressures his son into attending medical school, despite his protestations that he does not wish to study medicine. However, due to a mix up at the admissions office, the man's life changes forever.

== Cast ==
- Gajesh as Karthik
- Dimple Chopade as Karthika
- Akhil as Vignesh
- Ganja Karuppu as Azhappan
- Manobala as Principal Kamalnath
- Swaminathan as Ramanathan
- Nancy Jennifer as Porkodi
- T. P. Gajendran as Doctor
- Sriranjani
- Mayilswamy
- Mahanadi Shankar
- Muthuraman
- Bonda Mani

== Production ==
A. M. Nandakumar first approached Vimal to feature in the lead role, but was discouraged by the actor's salary request. The film later gained media attention prior to release, owing to the lead actor Gajesh's debut. He is the son of Anand Babu and grandson of comedian Nagesh. Following the appearance of Nagesh's animation in Kochadaiiyaan (2014), the director insisted on having a sequence in his film, where all three generations of the family appear in one scene through computer imagery. The film was shot mainly in Tamil Nadu, in places such as Karaikudi, Tiruchi and Kanyakumari.

== Release ==
The film had a limited release across Tamil Nadu on 31 October 2014, owing to the presence of bigger budget films at the box office. It opened to mixed reviews with a critics noting the film "is the kind of story that Tamil cinema had beaten to death in the 90s." Another reviewer noted that the film had a dated feel and called it "excruciatingly long".
