= Pleasant Stay hotel case =

1999 political scandal in Tamil Nadu, South India

- Date: 10 June 1999
- Location: Chennai
- Participants: J.Jayalalithaa, V. R. Nedunchezhiyan and T. M. Selvaganapathy
- Charges: Misuse of office, Corruption, Criminal conspiracy
- Verdict: Supreme Court: Acquitted of all charges, High Court: Acquitted of all charges Trial Court: One year imprisonment for all six
- Convictions: High Court: none; Trial Court: 5
- Litigation: 7 years

Participants
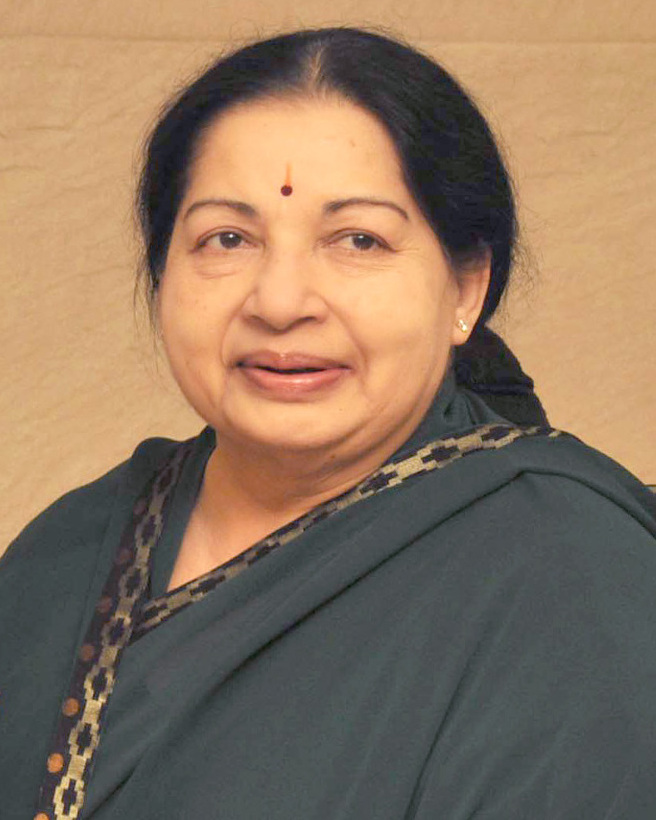
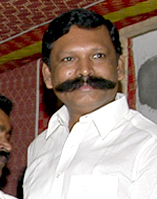
J.Jayalalithaa (pictured left) T. M. Selvaganapathy (right).

The Pleasant Stay hotel case was a case against Jayalalithaa, the late Chief Minister of Tamil Nadu, a state in South India during her tenure in 1991–1996. Jayalalitha and her ministerial colleague, V. R. Nedunchezhiyan and T. M. Selvaganapathy, were charged with misusing the office to allow Pleasant Stay Hotel in Kodaikanal to build seven floors against the norms. The case and charge sheet were filed during the following Dravida Munnetra Kazhagam (DMK) government headed by Karunanidhi in 1996. Jayalalitha and Selvaganapathy were convicted in the lower court, which sentenced her to one-year imprisonment to the two and three others involved. The case had political implications as the aftermath of violence created a furor in the state. In the statewide violence five buses were torched, and three girls students of the Tamil Nadu Agricultural University were burnt alive in a bus in Dharmapuri. Another 50 buses were damaged, and 40 people were injured. Three AIADMK party workers were convicted in the case of the death of the three students and given the death sentence in 2007, but their sentence was commuted to life imprisonment. The case had political implications as Jayalalithaa was disqualified from contesting the 2001 Tamil Nadu Legislative Assembly election. Though Jayalalithaa's nomination papers were rejected, she took oath as chief minister after the victory of AIADMK in the elections. The Supreme Court disqualified her in September 2001, resulting in her stepping down and elevation of O. Panneerselvam as the chief minister (Sasikala Suggested). The governor of Tamil Nadu, Fathima Beevi, who administered oath to J. Jayalalithaa, was advised to step down by the union ministry, who also sent the report to the President of India.

The Madras High Court acquitted her and the other four accused in the case of all the charges on 4 December 2001 along with the TANSI land acquisition case. The Supreme Court upheld the order of Madras High Court on 24 November 2003 on grounds of lack of evidence. She came back to power winning the 2002 Tamil Nadu assembly by-election from the Andipatti constituency in March 2002.

== Background ==
In April 1991, Mittal was permitted to construct two floors of his hotel named Pleasant Stay in Kodaikanal. In January 1992, he submitted a revised plan seeking permission to build seven floors altogether. His petition was rejected by Kodaikanal township and he filed an appeal. Not waiting for the appeal, he started constructing four floors of the hotel. On 13 May 1994, the Jayalalithaa government passed a government order G.O. Ms. No.126, which permitted Mittal to build five extra floors in a total of seven floors against the norms. Jayalalitha, the local administration minister Selvaganapathy, the municipal administration, and water supply secretary H.M. Pandey, executive director of the hotel Rakesh Mittal, and chairman and managing director of the hotel, Palai N. Shanmugham, were the five accused in the case.

It was reported that when P.C. Cyriac, who was the secretary of municipal administration and water supply, did not authorize the construction, he was transferred and replaced by Pandey. It was also inferred that the government order was passed by Jayalalitha, Selvaganapathy, and Pandey, against the recommendation by the Architectural and Aesthetics Aspects Committee (AAAC) headed by the chief secretary of the Government of Tamil Nadu. On 6 December 1994, the government passed another order G.O., Ms. No.317 with effect from 13 May 1994, preventing buildings from provisions of the Development Control Rules. On 31 March 1994, Mittal was ordered by Madras High Court not to use any floor other than the zero and first floors. He appealed higher, which was quashed along with the G.O. of 13 May 1994. The Palani Hills Conservation Council (PHCC) obtained a stay from Madras High Court in December 1997. There was a legal tangle between the hotel and PHCC, which PHCC won.

== Trial ==
The trial was held in a trial court in Chennai and was presided over by a special judge, Radhakrishnan. The prosecution team was headed by N. Natarajan, a senior special public prosecutor for corruption cases against Jayalalitha - it was conducted by special public prosecutors S. Ramasamy, K.E. Venkataraman, R. Karunakaran and advocate Sunder Mohan.

The judge noted that the First Investigation Report (FIR) was filed only two years after the incident on account of the involvement of higher officials and politicians. He also noted that there was a pecuniary advantage to the hotel management, though it was not proved that the passing of government orders in favour of the hotel management has no reciprocal benefit for the government officials involved. It quoted that Pandey, who knew the details about the case, did not follow the secretarial functions of passing the file directly to Jayalalitha via Selvaganapathy.

On 2 February 2000, the five were convicted and Jayalalithaa was sentenced to one year of rigorous imprisonment and levied a fine of ₹2,000 on charges of criminal conspiracy and criminal misconduct by a public servant. The judge in his order stated, "We have sufficient circumstantial evidence which proves beyond any reasonable doubt that Jayalalithaa, Selvaganapathy, and Pandey committed criminal misconduct abetted by Rakesh and Palani, and all were party to the criminal conspiracy. Hence I am inclined to impose the minimum sentence contemplated under Section 13(2) of the Prevention of Corruption Act".

On 9 February 2000, the Madras High Court suspended the implementation of the sentence on appeal from Jayalalitha.

== Aftermath ==
The supporters of Jayalalithaa were angered by the verdict, which led to statewide protests and violence, including damage to public property by AIADMK members. Two AIADMK cadres committed suicide by setting themselves ablaze. The violence resulted in the burning of five buses, damaging fifty buses, and leaving 40 people injured. Major violence took place in the state capital Chennai where 22 buses of the state-run MTC buses were damaged, leaving 27 people with injuries. The state bus transport was suspended for 24 hours and the police arrested 400 people across the state, with 317 from Chennai alone.

The major violence was that of 2000 Dharmapuri bus burning, where three girls were killed. On 2 February 2000, seventy students from the Tamil Nadu Agricultural University, Coimbatore, were returning from a study tour in two buses. They were stopped by the mob, who forced the students to alight. One of the men threw a petrol bomb, setting fire to a bus before all of the students got out. Three girls, Hemalatha from Chennai, V. Gayathri from Virudhachalam, and Kokilavani from Namakkal were burned to death, and 16 others sustained injuries. The scenes of the bus burning were captured and broadcast the following day on Sun TV. The incident caused anger amongst the student community. Schools and colleges were asked to shut for a week, and students across the state held silent processions and protest marches condemning the act. The three AIADMK men who were charged in the act went on to be sentenced by the High Court to death on 5 December 2007, confirming the lower court order. There was 25 other cadre of AIADMK who were convicted on lesser charges and sentenced to seven years of rigorous imprisonment.

The verdict came at a time when the Tamil Maanila Congress, which was in alliance with DMK during the 1996 parliamentary elections, was supporting the AIADMK in the upcoming by-elections. DMK was alleging that it was the handiwork of AIADMK cadre, while AIADMK demanded a Central Bureau of Investigation (CBI) probe in the issue questioning the presence of DMK supported Sun TV crew during the time of burning.

== Timeline ==
- April 1991 - Mittal was allowed to construct two floors of Pleasant Stay Hotel in Kodaikanal.
- 13 May 1994 - Jayalalithaa government passed a government order, G.O. Ms. No.126, which permitted Mittal to build five extra floors in a total of seven floors against the norms.
- 6 December 1994 - The government passed another order, G.O., Ms. No.317 with effect from 13 May 1994, preventing buildings from provisions of the Development Control Rules.
- 31 March 1994 - Mittal was ordered by Madras High Court not to use any floor other than the zero and first floors. He went on higher appeal, which was quashed along with the G.O. of 13 May 1994.
- 18 January 1997 - Directorate of Vigilance and Anti-Corruption (DVAC) files charge sheet against the five accused.
- 2 February 2000 - Jayalalitha and the other four accused, the local administration minister Selvaganapathy, the municipal administration and water supply secretary H.M. Pandey, executive director of the hotel Rakesh Mittal, and chairman and managing director of the hotel, Palai N. Shanmugham, were sentenced to one-year imprisonment.
- Widespread violence in the state, where three college students were burnt alive in a bus.
- May 2001 - AIADMK led by Jayalalithaa sweeps polls.
- 14 May 2001 - Jayalalithaa assumes office amid controversy. Governor Fathima Beevi administers oath of confidence.
- 1 July 2001 - Fathima Beevi, the then governor of Tamil Nadu resigns after being asked to step down by the union ministry.
- 21 September 2001 - Supreme Court disqualifies Jayalalithaa.
- 4 December 2001 - Madras High Court acquits Jayalalithaa of all her charges in the two cases.
- March 2002 - Jayalalithaa becomes the Chief Minister of Tamil Nadu.
- 24 November 2003 - Supreme Court of India upholds the verdict of High Court along with TANSI land acquisition case.
- 15 February 2007 - Trial court sentences three AIADMK cadre to death involved in bus burning incident and 25 others get seven years rigorous imprisonment.
- 5 December 2007 - High court confirms death to the three AIADMK cadre involved in bus burning incident killing three girls.

== Political implications ==
The AIADMK party swept the poll in 2001 and though she was disqualified from contesting, she was sworn in as the Chief Minister. There was an appeal in Supreme Court against her appointment as Chief minister quoting a convicted person cannot hold government office. K. Venugopal appeared as counsel for Jayalalithaa and Sasikala, while Venkatapathy acted as the public prosecutor. While the prosecutor sought further time to study the case, the court went ahead with the hearing of the appellate. K. Venugopal argued that there was no impropriety with Jayalalithaa continuing as Chief minister as it was a large scale people's mandate that wanted her as the chief minister. On 21 September 2001, a five-member bench of the Supreme Court ordered that a disqualified person cannot hold office of the Chief minister. The judges quoted that people's mandate cannot overrule constitution. The governor of Tamil Nadu, Fathima Beevi, who administered oath to Jayalalithaa, was advised to step down by the union ministry, who also sent the report to the President of India. It was a rare case of a constitutional functionary being removed from power for omission of duties. She resigned before she could be called back by the central government on 1 July 2001 and her resignation was accepted and C. Rangarajan, the then governor of neighbouring state Andhra Pradesh was given additional charge as governor of Tamil Nadu.

Following the disqualification of Jayalalithaa as Chief minister, media reported various front runners for the post. There were no clear names emerging. Subsequently, at a meeting of AIADMK, O. Panneerselvam was chosen as the Chief Minister of Tamil Nadu.

On 4 December 2001, the Madras High Court acquitted her of all the charges on the Pleasant Stay hotel case. She contested the Andipatti assembly constituency and was sworn in again as the Chief Minister. The Supreme Court reserved the orders of the lower court against the leave petition filed by DMK party counsel against the lower court verdict. Subramaniya Swami appealed against her acquittal in the lower court in the Supreme Court of India, which again acquitted her from the two cases on 24 November 2003 ruling that though there is strong suspicion about her involvement in the case, there was no legal evidence to prove her guilt. The judge also ordered "She must atone her conscience in the whole controversy". It was later reported that she returned the land to the agency at throwaway price.
