= Mohammad Asif (politician) =

Indian politician

Mohammad Asif is a politician and minister from the Indian state of Tamil Nadu. He was elected to the Tamil Nadu legislative assembly as an Anna Dravida Munnetra Kazhagam candidate from Triplicane constituency in 1991 election. He served as rural industries minister in Jayalalitha cabinet formed after 1991 election.

== See also ==
- TANSI land acquisition case
