= Jambhavan =

- Poster
- Directed by: A. M. Nandakumar
- Written by: A. M. Nandakumar
- Produced by: T. T. Raja; S. Sathya Narayanan
- Starring: Prashanth; Nila; Meghna Naidu
- Cinematography: Ramesh Babu
- Edited by: Shankar
- Music by: Bharadwaj
- Production companies: ESK Frames; Rajalakshmi Kalaikudam
- Release date: 8 September 2006
- Running time: 158 minutes
- Country: India
- Language: Tamil

Jambhavan (/dʒɑːmbəvɑːn/) is a 2006 Indian Tamil-language action film written and directed by A. M. Nandakumar. The film stars Prashanth, Nila and Meghna Naidu, while Vivek, Vijayan and Vijayakumar play other pivotal roles. Featuring music composed by Bharadwaj, the film was released on 8 September 2006.

== Plot ==
Velan is a responsible son of a village landlord. Adored by the villagers for his good deeds, Velan gets a shock when the landlord informs him that he is his foster son. A shocked Velan sets out on a mission to learn about his past. He reaches Chennai and learns that his family members were killed by the dreaded gangster Deva. He then vows to kill him and his gang. In the name of Jambhavan, he starts to kill rowdies in the society. Suffering a head injury, Velan loses his memory and is later adopted by the landlord. He realises that his job was just half-done. The remainder of the movie is how he puts an end to Deva and his men.

== Cast ==
- Prashanth as Velan (Jambhavan)
- Meera Chopra as Ezhil
- Meghna Naidu as Anu
- Vijayan as Deva
- Vijayakumar as Velan's foster father
- Vivek as Subhash
- Madhan Bob as Doctor
- Y. G. Mahendran as CBI officer Ganapathy
- T. N. Seshagopalan
- Nancy Jennifer
- Mayilsamy
- Venba

== Production ==
The making of the film was disrupted in early 2006, when Nila walked out of the film after falling out with the producers. It was revealed that for a bathing scene in Courtallam she had asked for the tub to be filled with mineral water and when the team could not satisfy that demand, she had a difference of opinion with the producers. Nila revealed that she was an asthma sufferer and was unable to get into the tub of water that the team had provided. Nila eventually put aside her differences with the producers. The scene that could not be filmed in Courtallam was later filmed in Bangkok, Thailand. A thirty-day schedule was held in Tenkasi.

== Soundtrack ==
The soundtrack was composed by Bharadwaj.

Song	Singer(s)	Lyrics
"Pana Marathuley"	Ranjith, Janani Bharadwaj	Na. Muthukumar
"Velan Vetri Velan"	Karthik	Kabilan
"Sandhakaram"	T. N. Seshagopalan	Andal Priyadarshini
"Pen Alaiye"	Kavitha	Kabilan
"Halwa Ponnu"	Roshni, Tippu	Pa. Vijay
"Jambavaan Theme"	Instrumental	
"Ethanai Varusham"	Janani Bharadwaj, Vijay Yesudas	Muthu Vijayan

== Critical reception ==
A critic from Sify noted, "this film is a slapdash enterprise that will make you groan", adding "it caters strictly to B and C class audiences and leaves you cold". S. R. Ashok Kumar of The Hindu wrote, "Prasanth's acting and Shankar's editing act as the saving graces of ESK Frames' Rajalakshmi Kalaikoodam "Jaambavan." The director Nandakumar, also in charge of screenplay and dialogue, falls short in his effort to make the film a wholesome entertainer".
