= Kalloori =

2007 film by Balaji Sakthivel

- Theatrical release poster
- Directed by: Balaji Sakthivel
- Written by: Balaji Sakthivel
- Produced by: S. Shankar
- Starring: Akhil; Tamannaah Bhatia; Bharani; Hemalatha; Maya Reddy; Sailatha; Prakaash; Kamakshinathan; Rajeswari; Thisaigal Arunkumar
- Cinematography: Chezhiyan
- Edited by: G. Sasikumar
- Music by: Joshua Sridhar
- Production company: S Pictures
- Distributed by: S Pictures
- Release date: 7 December 2007
- Country: India
- Language: Tamil

Kalloori (transl. College) is a 2007 Indian Tamil-language coming-of-age drama film by director Balaji Sakthivel. The film was produced by S. Shankar via S Pictures. The story, based on a college campus, stars Akhil, Tamannaah Bhatia, and Bharani alongside an ensemble cast including Hemalatha, Maya Reddy, Rajeshwari, Sailatha, Prakaash, Kamakshinathan, and Thisaigal Arunkumar. The music was scored by Joshua Sridhar, and lyrics were written by Na. Muthukumar.

Kalloori drew inspiration from a real-life incident in which three college girls from the Tamil Nadu Agricultural University were burnt alive in the 2000 Dharmapuri bus burning incident. Released on 7 December 2007, the film became a success and is recognized as a milestone in Bhatia's career.

== Plot ==
The film opens with a group of students clearing weeds near a roadside tree. Flashing back a few years earlier, a bus full of college students heads towards Government Arts College in a small town. Among them are Muthuchelvan, Ramesh, Kayalvizhi, Adhilakshmi, Nagarani, Albert, Kamakshinathan, Salima, and Ayyanar, who have been friends since high school. Muthu showcases his athletic talent, while Ramesh is a charismatic flirt and movie enthusiast. Kayal is determined and independent, adamant about not falling in love within their friend group. Adhilakshmi has a passion for food, while Nagarani, who speaks Telugu, suffers from fits when frightened. Albert, a Christian, faces abuse from his alcoholic father. Kamakshinathan, although wealthy, struggles with shyness, especially when meeting new classmates. Salima excels in academics and dance, and Ayyanar adds a quirky touch to the group dynamics. As they step into college for the first time, their journey begins.

In a classroom, a strikingly different girl named Shobhana catches the attention of the group. Initially puzzled by her aloof demeanor, they later discover that she's grieving the recent loss of her mother in an accident. Sympathizing with her, the group warmly embraces Shobhana, and she becomes an integral part of their circle. Despite her initial plans to pursue studies in Delhi, she chooses to stay with her newfound friends during college. As their friendship blossoms, the movie portrays the vibrancy of college life and the diverse backgrounds of the friends, many of whom hail from impoverished families. Among them is Muthu, an aspiring athlete with ambitions to uplift his family through sports. Shobhana, coming from a privileged background, is deeply moved by Muthu's determination and supports him wholeheartedly. Initially offering encouragement, her feelings gradually evolve into a special connection with Muthu. Despite their growing affection, they prioritize their friendship with the group and mutually agree to set aside their romantic feelings for the greater good.

Eventually, the friends take a college trip to Andhra. During a stop at a hotel serving only non-vegetarian food, Muthu volunteers to fetch vegetarian food for Shobhana. In a heartfelt moment, Shobhana confesses her love for Muthu to Kayal, who accepts it graciously despite her reservations about romantic involvement between friends. Adhilakshmi overhears this conversation and shares it with the group, bringing surprise and joy. However, their plans are disrupted when the hotel is abruptly closed due to a political incident. As they rush to safety, their bus is stopped by protestors who set it on fire. Amid the chaos, some students are trapped, and tragically, Kayal, Adhilakshmi, and Shobhana perish while trying to escape. The last scene flashes back to the beginning of the movie, where the group of people was clearing the weeds. It has been eight years since the incident, and every year, the group of friends come to pay respects to their lost friends, and Muthu still keeps Shobhana's handkerchief in remembrance of their love.

== Cast ==
- Akhil as Muthuchelvan
- Tamannaah Bhatia as Shobana
- Bharani as Ramesh
- Hemalatha as Kayalvizhi
- Maya Reddy as Saleema
- Sailatha as Nagarani
- Prakaash as Albert
- Kamakshinathan as Kamakshinathan
- Rajeswari as Adhilakshmi
- Thisaigal Arunkumar as Ayyanar
- Mohamed Mufak as Karthi
- Balamurugan
- Arunkumar
- Alex
- Vinoth as Iruvar
- Sivakumar as Lecturer
- Usha Elizabeth as Lecturer

== Production ==
Actor Akhil and art director Mayil Krishnan made their debut with this film. Filming began in May 2007, and the first schedule was held at Sivaganga and its surrounding areas. By November filming was complete, and the film was in its "finishing touches".

== Soundtrack ==
The music was composed by Joshua Sridhar, with lyrics by Na. Muthukumar. The audio launch was held at Green Park Hotel, Chennai in November 2007.

Track listing
No.	Title	Singer(s)	Length
1.	"June July Matham"	Krish, Rita Thyagarajan	5:55
2.	"Sariya Ithu Thavara"	Haricharan	5:22
3.	"Unnarugil Varugaiyil"	Haricharan, Harini Sudhakar	5:29
4.	"Kalloori Theme Music"	Haricharan	5:23
5.	"Vandanam Ayya Vandanam"	Thiyagu, Ramesh, Prakash	5:50
Total length:			27:59

== Critical reception ==
Pavithra Srinivasan of Rediff.com gave the film 3.5/5 stars, stating, "Kalloori might be devoid of action, item songs and glitzy costumes -- but what it gives you is the real deal." She expressed that the film offers a refreshing take on college life, focusing on the genuine camaraderie and struggles of a group of friends in a rural setting. With a naturalistic portrayal of characters and an unexpected storyline, the film captivates audiences by eschewing clichés and embracing realism. The Times of India, in their review rated the film 2.5/5 stars and commented that it tells the story of nine close-knit friends from unprivileged backgrounds at a small-town college, whose lives change with the arrival of Shobana, a wealthy girl from Bangalore. The film beautifully captures the tender dynamics between Shobana and Muthu but concludes with an unexpectedly brutal climax, undermining its otherwise heartwarming narrative. Malini Mannath of Chennai Online wrote "'Kalloori', coming on the lines of 'S' Production's earlier films like 'Kadhal' and 'Veyil', is a film with it's [sic] poignant moments, engaging narration and a wholesome appeal". Deccan Herald wrote, "The director, casting many newcomers, has elicited the best from them. Their performances can astound even the best of actors in Tamil cinema. Tamanna could have done a better job though."

== Controversy ==
After the film was released, Balaji Sakthivel altered the climax following negative reactions to a scene reminiscent of the 2000 Dharmapuri bus burning in which three girls were killed in a bus.
