= Masani (film) =

2013 Indian film by K. Padmaraja and LGR

- Theatrical release poster
- Directed by: K. Padmaraja; LGR
- Written by: LGR (Dialogue)
- Screenplay by: Sri Green Productions Team
- Story by: K. Padmaraja
- Produced by: M. S. Saravanan
- Starring: Ramki; Akhil; Ineya; Sija Rose
- Cinematography: Raja Guru
- Edited by: V. T. Vijayan; T. S. Jay
- Music by: S.N. Fazil
- Production company: Sri Green Productions
- Distributed by: Studio 9 Productions; Abi & Abi Pictures
- Release date: 24 May 2013
- Running time: 150 minutes
- Country: India
- Language: Tamil

Masani is a 2013 Indian Tamil-language supernatural horror film directed by K. Padmaraja and LGR. The film stars Ramki, Akhil, Ineya, and Sija Rose, while Roja, Sarath Babu, Aadukalam Naren, and Y. G. Mahendra play supporting roles. The film marks Ramki's comeback to Tamil cinema after six years. The music is composed by S. N. Fazil. The film was released on 24 May 2013.

== Plot ==
Vishwa, a graduate, is raised by Swami, a leading sculptor, and has learned the skill of sculpting from Swami. Vishwa meets Kavitha, and both of them like each other. Meanwhile, there is a village where many sculptors come to finish a god's idol that is left incomplete a few years back, but all efforts go in vain as the sculptors are frightened and sent away by a ghost which prevents the completion of the idol. The village head's wife Rajeshwari has enmity with her relative Devanna Gounder, who happens to be Kavitha's father. As per the advice from an astrologer, Devanna meets Swami, requesting him to visit his village and complete the god's idol. However, Swami insists Vishwa to do the job on his behalf.

Swami tells a flashback to Vishwa. Vetri is the only brother of the village head who falls in love with Masani, a lower caste girl from the same village. Masani gets pregnant, and Vetri decides to marry her against Rajeshwari's wishes. Vetri stands firm in his decision, but Rajeshwari poisons and kills him. She also insults Masani for getting pregnant before wedding and isolates her out of the village, asking no one to help her. Masani undergoes many hardships as she is left alone. Swami comes to the village to make the god's idol and sees Masani in labor pain. Despite his attempts, no one comes forward to help her. Masani delivers a baby boy, informs about her life to Swami, and passes away. Swami gets furious on the village people and leaves the village without completing the idol, believing that the entire village will one day realize their mistake.

Swami adopts the baby, who is none other than Vishwa. Vishwa comes to the village and successfully completes the idol. Masani's soul thrashes Rajeshwari, which makes her confess all the truth to villagers. Rajeshwari then gets killed by Masani's soul. Swami arrives and informs that Vishwa is none other than the son of Vetri and Masani. The entire village realizes their mistake and apologizes to Vishwa. Finally, Vishwa is married to Kavitha.

== Cast ==
- Ramki as Vettri
- Akhil as Vishva
- Ineya as Masaani (Voice dubbed by Uma Mageshwari)
- Sija Rose as Kavitha (Voice dubbed by Savitha Radhakrishnan)
- Roja as Rajeshwari
- Sarath Babu as Village Head
- Aadukalam Naren as Devanna Gounder
- Y. G. Mahendra as Swami
- Manobala as Priest
- Pandi as Vishva's friend
- Chitti Babu as Minor
- Devan as Swami
- Uma Padmanabhan as Mahalakshmi
- Sutha Prakash as Kamala
- Rajhesh Vaidhya
- Mohan Vaidya as Temple priest
- Bonda Mani
- Vasu Vikram
- Halwa Vasu
- Kovai Senthil
- Theni Murugan
- Rajendranath

== Soundtrack ==
The soundtrack was composed by S. N. Fazil.

Track listing
No.	Title	Singer(s)	Length
1.	"Uyir Ragam"	K. S. Chithra	5:35
2.	"Malli Malli"	Krishnaraj	5:32
3.	"Yedho Yedho"	Shweta Mohan, Haricharan	4:44
4.	"Naan Paada"	Chinmayi	4:54
5.	"Aatha Ingey"	Mukesh Mohamed	4:04
Total length:			29:10

== Critical reception ==
M Suganth of The Times of India wrote, "Taking such a dated concept, directors Padmaraja and LGR have created a film that feels redundant and terribly dull. Even the supernatural serials that you have on TV have some bit of tension which is sorely lacking here". Dinamalar also reviewed the film negatively for its outdated subject. Sify wrote, "On the whole, it is more fatiguing than frightening. It’s rather interesting to note how films like this are still made in Tamil? A waste of time, energy and resources".
