= Akhil (Tamil actor) =

Indian actor

- Born: 3 May 1988 (age 38); Dindigul, Tamil Nadu, India
- Occupation: Actor
- Years active: 2007–present

Akhil (born 3 May 1988) is an Indian actor who has appeared in Tamil language films. He made his debut in the 2007 film, Kalloori, directed by Balaji Sakthivel.

== Career ==
The actor made his debut in Balaji Sakthivel's critically acclaimed film Kalloori (2007) alongside Tamannaah and produced by S. Shankar. Akhil farook was Selected by the director after seeing him in his school football team. The film opened to positive reviews and Akhil subsequently won a nomination for the Vijay Award for Best Debut Actor category. He was next seen in Vaalmiki (2009) alongside Meera Nandan but the film opened to negative reviews, while Nandhi (2011) alongside Sanusha also released with little publicity. In 2013, he played in the supernatural horror thriller film, Masani. His following films were Dhanush 5am Vaguppu (2014), Rettai Vaalu (2014) and Kalkandu (2014).

In 2016, he appeared in Azhagu Kutti Chellam which received positive reviews followed by Ilami where he has brilliantly transformed as a menacing villain in this film. His other films include Pagadi Aattam (2017), Padaiveeran (2018), Alai Pesi (2018), 50 Roova (2019) and Engada Iruthinga Ivvalavu Naala (2021).

== Filmography ==
Year	Film	Role	Notes
2007	Kalloori	Muthu Selvan	Nominated, Vijay Award for Best Debut Actor
2009	Vaalmiki	Pandi	
2011	Nandhi	Pazhani	
2013	Masani	Vishva	
2014	Dhanush 5am Vaguppu	Paarai	
2014	Rettai Vaalu	Sekar	
2014	Kalkandu	Vignesh	
2016	Azhagu Kutti Chellam	Saravanan	
2016	Ilami	Sadai Puli	
2017	Pagadi Aattam	Surya's friend	
2018	Padaiveeran	Selvam	
2018	Alai Pesi		
2019	50 Roova		
2021	Engada Iruthinga Ivvalavu Naala	Sanjay	
2022	Mofussil	Surya	Delayed film; released on YouTube

=== Music videos ===
Year	Title	Artist	Notes	Ref.
2010	"Semmozhiyaana Thamizh Mozhiyaam"	A. R. Rahman	Non-album single	
