= Nancy Jennifer =

Indian actress

- Born: Chennai, India
- Other names: Baby Jennifer
- Occupation: Actress
- Years active: 1991-present

Nancy Jennifer, previously credited as Baby Jennifer, is an Indian actress who has appeared in Tamil language films. After making her debut as a child artiste, Jennifer has also featured in supporting and lead roles.

== Career ==
Nancy Jennifer began acting as a child actress and featured in Vasanth's Nerrukku Ner (1997), as a small child who is caught up by her parents’ divorce. She later appeared in films including Asokavanam and Ghilli (2004), portraying Vijay's sister. In the late 2000s, she became a lead actress and appeared in the low-budget films Thozha (2008) and Puthiya Payanam. After being unable to garner success as a lead actress, Jennifer has regularly featured as a supporting actress and as a host for STAR Vijay.

== Selected filmography ==
Year	Film	Role	Notes
1991	Kizhakku Karai	Murali's and Mahalakshmi's son	Child artist
1992	Idhuthanda Sattam	Meena (Baby)	Child artist
1996	Thayagam	Angela	Child artist
1997	Sakthi	Devi	Child artist
1997	Nerrukku Ner	Sona	Child artist
1998	Ulavuthurai	Priya	Child artist
1998	Sandhippoma	Vishwa's sister	Child artist
1999	Kanmani Unakkaga	Kanmani	Child artist
1999	Time	Priya's sister	Child artist
2000	Independence Day	Indu	Child artist
2001	Asokavanam	Priya	Child artist
2004	Ghilli	Bhuvana	
2005	February 14	Gayathri	
2006	Unakkum Enakkum	Santhosh's distant cousin	
2006	Jambhavan		
2008	Thozha	Priya	
2013	Theeya Velai Seiyyanum Kumaru	Maya	
2014	Kalkandu	Porkodi	
2017	Kootathil Oruthan	Ranjini	
2021	Trip	Jenny	

== Television ==
Year	Title	Role	Channel
1998-1999	Jannal - Adutha Veetu Kathaigal		Sun TV
1998	Chinna Chinna Aasai - Pooja	Pooja	Sun TV
2012	Naalaiya Iyakkunar Season 4	Host	Kalaignar TV
2013-2014	Thayumanavan	Indra	Vijay TV
2016-2017	Keladi Kanmani	Nageshwari	Sun TV
2017-2018	Valli	Brindha	Sun TV
2017-2018	Star Wars	Herself	Sun TV
2021	Idhayathai Thirudathey	Anitha	Colors Tamil
2021	Chithi 2	Jeni	Sun TV
