= Moondru Mudichu (Tamil TV series) =

2024 Indian Tamil–language romantic love triangle drama series

- Genre: Drama
- Written by: R. Kumaran
- Screenplay by: R. Kumaran; Bharathi Thambi(1-400) Nandhan Sreedharan (401-Present) (dialogues)
- Directed by: Nanthan C. Muthiah
- Starring: Swathi Konde; Niyaz Khan
- Opening theme: "Pennaaga Piranthaale"; Vandana Srinivasan (Vocals); Snehan (Lyrics)
- Country of origin: India
- Original language: Tamil
- No. of seasons: 1
- No. of episodes: 800+

Production
- Producers: A. Anburaja; A. Suresh Babu
- Cinematography: K.G Venkatesh; S.Narendra Kumar
- Editor: C.M. Selvakumar
- Camera setup: Multi-camera
- Running time: Approx.20–22 minutes per episode (2024–Jan.2026); Approx.42–44 minutes per episode (Feb.2026–present)
- Production company: AR Film World

Original release
- Network: Sun TV
- Release: 19 August 2024 – present

Moondru Mudichu (transl. Three Knots) is an Indian Tamil-language television series starring Swathi Konde and Niyaz Khan. This story evolves around a girl and her husband, whose lives are changed after an unexpected marriage.

This series is directed by Nanthan C. Muthiah and produced by Sun Entertainment and AR Film World. It premiered on 19 August 2024, and airs Monday to Sunday on Sun TV and also available on the digital platform Sun NXT.

== Plot ==
Nandini, a strong-willed girl of a middle-class single father, lives in a village. She is well liked and places her family's happiness above hers. Suryakumar is a young businessman and hates his mother. His rich joint family members have different thoughts. He resents his mother and deliberately bonds with Nandini to cause strife. Then, Surya forcibly marries Nandhini. At first, they dislike this marriage, but eventually fall in love with each other. The story revolves around Nandini's life in Suryakumar's joint family.

== Cast ==
=== Main ===
- Swathi Konde as Nandhini Suryakumar: Suryakumar's wife
- Niyaz Khan as Suryakumar Arunachalam alias Surya: Nandhini's husband; A young businessman, Arunachalam and Sundaravalli's only son

=== Recurring ===
- Preethi Sanjiv as Sundaravalli Arunachalam: Surya's mother
- Krithika Laddu as Madhavi Ashokan: Surya's elder sister
- Poraali Dileepan as Ashokan alias Ashok: Madhavi's husband
- Sai Lavanyaa as Surekha Elantharian: Surya's younger sister; Ranjith's ex-husband; Elantharian wife
- Prabhakaran Chandran as Arunachalam: Surya's father
- Hariharan as Elantharian: Surekha's husband
- Doubt Senthil as Vivek: Viji's husband; Surya's best friend
- Sruthi Shanmuga Priya as Viji Vivek: Vivek's wife

=== Other cast ===
- Dharshna Sripal Golecha as Archana: Surya's fiancé
- Pulikutty Selvam as Kalyanam: Surya's servant
- V. Jayalakshmi as Parameshwari: Sundaravalli's arch-rival
- Arun Chandra Kumar as Ranjith: Surekha's fiancee
- Maheswari Yayathiraj as Haritha: Surya's cousin
- Niyaz Musaliyar as Pandian: Sundaravalli's brother
- Nivishka as Jothi: Pandian's wife
- Theni Murukan / Hello Kandasamy as Singaaram: Nandhini's father (2024–2025) / (2026–present)
- Geetha Ravishankar as Nandhini's grandmother
- Kavya Bellu / Hema as Punitha: Nandhini's sister (2024–2025) / (2026–present)
- Baby Kaavya as Ranjitha: Nandhini's sister
- Vidhu Balaji / J.Durairaj as Kaushik: Ranjith's friend (2026) / (2026–present)
- Sahana Shetty as Madhangi: Ranjith's henchwoman
- Vijay Babu as Tiger Chakravarthy: Dileepan's father
- Premalatha as Revathi: Tiger Chakravarthy's wife
- Agathiyan as Ex-Minister Rathnavelu: Archana's father
- Meena Vemuri as Kamatchi: Rathnavelu's wife
- Durai Sudhakar as Sudhakar
- Manikandan Raj as Inspector Pandian
- Vadivukkarasi as Rajalakshmi
- Bhagyalakshmi as Usha
- Sudharsanam as Veera: Parameshwari's brother-in-law
- Indran as Robinhood

=== Special Appearance ===
- Marumagal family members in Mahasangamam and Megasangamam (2025;2026)
- Singapennae family members in Mahasangamam and Megasangamam (2026)

== Production ==
=== Development ===
The series was announced as a part of Sun TV's slate of six upcoming series announced in April 2024. The series is directed by Nanthan C. Muthiah. AR Film World produces the show. Initially, the title of the serial was named 'Devathai' and 'Vaaranam Aayiram'. The first promo was released in the name of as 'Moondru Mudichu' on 31 July 2024.

=== Casting ===
Actress Swathi Konde was cast as Nandhini. This marks Swathi Konde's return to Tamil television after Eeramana Rojave 2. Preethi Sanjiv was cast as Sundaravalli. Niyaz Khan was cast as the male lead Surya. Niyaz to act in this series, he left the series Sandakozhi which aired on Zee Tamil.

In September, Dharshna Sripal Golecha was cast as Archana, making her third collaboration with Sun TV after Chithi 2 and Poova Thalaya. The same month Tamil film director Agathiyan was cast as Archana's father.

=== Release ===
The serial was released on 19 August 2024, replacing Vanathai Pola.

== Broadcast history ==
It began airing on Sun TV on 19 August 2024 from Monday to Saturday at 20:30 (IST). Starting on 20 July 2026, Later, a serial named Iru Malargal it shifted to the evening slot at 21:30 IST..

== Adaptations ==
Language	Title	Original release	Network(s)	Last aired	Notes	Ref.
Telugu	Moodu Mullu మూడు ముల్లు	30 September 2024	Gemini TV	Ongoing	Remake	
Malayalam	Swayamvarapanthal സ്വയംവരപന്തൽ	17 February 2025	Surya TV	Ongoing	Remake	
Kannada	Mangalya ಮಾಂಗಲ್ಯ	2 September 2025	Udaya TV	Ongoing	Remake	
