= Rettai Vaalu =

2014 Indian film by Desika

- Directed by: Desika
- Produced by: S. K. Jaya Ilavarasan
- Starring: Akhil; Saranya Nag; Kovai Sarala; Thambi Ramaiah
- Cinematography: Chitti Babu.K
- Music by: V. Selvaganesh
- Production company: Pranav Productions
- Release date: 19 September 2014
- Country: India
- Language: Tamil

Rettai Vaalu (transl. Double tail or two tails ) is a 2014 Indian Tamil language romantic drama film written and directed by Desika. The film stars Akhil and Saranya Nag, and was released in September 2014.

== Plot ==
Sekar, a thief taking refuge by working on a farm, falls in love with Anjali, a local girl. When Anjali's parents discover that he is a thief, they discourage her from continuing the relationship. Anjali ignores her parents' advice and continues making plans to elope with him. While Sekar's parents make arrangements for the young couple to marry, Sekar continues his criminal activities. On the night before Sekar and Anjali's marriage, Sekar's criminal cronies intoxicate him in order to sell Anjali into slavery. Sekar looks for Anjali, eventually finding the place where she was sold, and kills a woman working in the slavery business. Meanwhile, Anjali is injured by slave traders as she is thrown from a car when the drivers learn of the woman's murder by Sekar. While hospitalized, Anjali is killed by her father who fears unwanted media attention. Sekar reaches the hospital and learns about the death of Anjali.

== Cast ==
- Akhil as Sekar
- Saranya Nag as Anjali
- Kovai Sarala
- Thambi Ramaiah as Ramasamy Padayatchi
- Pasanga Sivakumar
- Sairamani
- Benven Prabhakaran

== Production ==
Desika made his directorial debut with the film, after having apprenticed under Thambi Ramaiah, Sairamani and Sakthi Chidambaram for fifteen years. He approached real estate businessman, Jaya Ilavarasan, with the script and persuaded him to finance the film. The team began filming scenes across Chennai in September 2012 under the title of Vaalu. During production, the film faced a legal dispute over the title with the makers of the Silambarasan movie Vaalu. The Tamil Film Producers Council concluded that Desika's team had not registered the title and the film was renamed Rettai Vaalu.

== Soundtrack ==
The music for the film was composed by V. Selvaganesh, and the lyrics were written by Vairamuthu. In June 2013, the team held an audio launch function where the first CD was released by Vairamuthu and received by producers R. B. Choudary and Keyaar.

- Aatha Enakku - Srinivas, M. M. Manasi
- Kulu Kulungudhu - Chinmayi
- Maalai Soodiya - Karthik, M. M. Manasi
- Ulloor Samigala - Krishnaraj, Priya Himesh
- Pallikoodam - Laxman Aravind, Harish, Rishi Ravikumar
- Vandhu Nillu - Priya Himesh, Lallu Prasad

== Release and reception ==
The film had a limited release across Tamil Nadu on 19 September 2014 due to the presence of bigger budget films at the box office. The New Indian Express wrote "The verbosity, and a flippant first half alienates the audience from the lovers plight. With no big names to boast of, there was no expectation from the film. And so no great disappointment either".
