= Meghna Naidu =

Indian actress

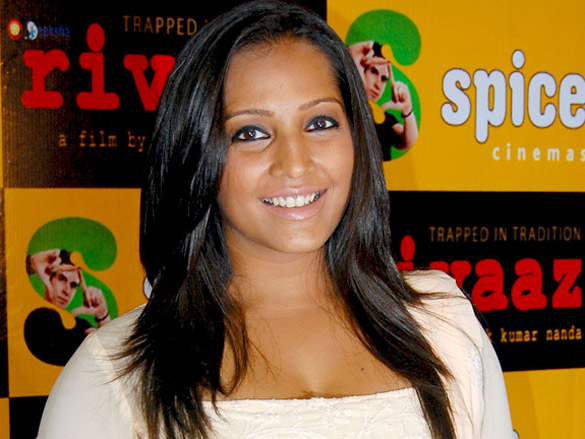
- Naidu at the press conference of Rivaaz
- Born: 19 September 1980 (age 45); Vijayawada, Andhra Pradesh, India
- Occupation: Actress
- Years active: 1999—2019
- Spouse: Luis Miguel Reis (m. 2016)

Meghna Naidu (born 19 September 1980) is an Indian actress who has starred primarily in Hindi films. She has also appeared in Telugu, Tamil, Kannada, Malayalam, Marathi and Bengali films.

== Biography ==
Naidu's first major appearance was in the music video for UMI10's "Kaliyon Ka Chaman" (2002), an official remix of Lata Mangeshkar's 1981 song "Thoda Resham Lagta Hai" (in turn, the 2002 song "Addictive" by Truth Hurts was inspired by the remix). She was also featured in Saru Maini's video "Dil De Diya Tha (Sutta Mix)" before starting to work in Indian films.

== Early life ==
Naidu was born on 19 September 1980 in Vijayawada, Andhra Pradesh, India. Her father Ethiraj works for Air India and was a tennis coach and her mother Purnima, was a school teacher. She has one younger sister, Sona. She told that she requested her mother to quit her job and accompany her to shooting locations, after her sister who used to travel with her got a job abroad. She grew up in Mumbai, Maharashtra, and considers herself "more of a Mumbaiite". She studied at Bhavan's College, Andheri, Mumbai, and graduated with a B.Com degree. She trained in classical bharatanatyam for seven years. She stated that she also was coaching tennis in the US for four years.

== Career ==
At the age of 18, she met a model co-ordinator at the wedding of her cousin in Chennai, who called her for a screen test for a feature film. Luckily she secured a role in the Telugu film Prema Sakshi (1999), following which she appeared in one more Telugu and two Kannada films. She then appeared in UMI10's music video "Kaliyon Ka Chaman", directed by Radhika Rao and Vinay Sapru, which she says happened by accident. She was accompanying her friend to the audition for the video, when she was approached by the team. She was asked to send in her photographs and within few days, she was selected for the video. "Kaliyon Ka Chaman" became a grand success and gained her recognition. She subsequently went on to do many stage performances in and outside of India.

She made her Bollywood debut with the B-grade film Hawas (2004), which dealt with extramarital affair. It was followed by lead roles in Classic Dance of Love (2005), which featured her as a dancer, and Rain: The Terror Within... (2005), in which she played a blind author. In Mashooka, she played a character with negative shades. In her latter career, she mostly made special appearances in item numbers in South Indian films.

She also participated in the television shows Fear Factor - Khatron Ke Khiladi and Dancing Queen. She played the role of Benazir in the TV series, Jodha Akbar.

== Personal life ==
Naidu started a relationship with tennis player Luis Miguel Reis in 2011; they married on 12 December 2016. They live in Dubai, and she travels to India for work.

== Filmography ==
Year	Title	Role	Language	Other notes
1999	Prema Sakshi		Telugu	Debut
2002	Action No. 1		Telugu	
2002	Prudhvi Narayana		Telugu	
2002	Vendi Mabbulu	Shanaya Sardesai	Telugu	
2003	Katthegalu Saar Katthegalu		Kannada	Debut
2003	Don	Jhansi a.k.a. Kaveri	Kannada	
2004	Hawas	Sapna R. Mittal	Hindi	Debut
2004	AK-47		Hindi	Special appearance
2004	Coolie		Bengali	Debut
2004	Satruvu	Club Dancer in Dubai	Telugu	
2005	Jackpot – The Money Game	Gauri	Hindi	
2005	Classic Dance of Love	Doli	Hindi	
2005	Mashooka	Sanjana	Hindi	
2005	Bhama Kalapam	Anjali	Telugu	
2005	Rain: The Terror Within...	Sandhya Bhatnagar	Hindi	
2005	Bad Friend	Sargam	Hindi	
2006	Saravana	Sathya	Tamil	Debut
2006	Eight: The Power of Shani	Sapna	Hindi	
2006	Vikramarkudu	Dancer Chameli	Telugu	Special appearance
2006	Jambhavan	Anu	Tamil	
2006	Bada Dosth		Malayalam	Debut Special appearance
2007	Aadavari Matalaku Ardhalu Verule	Herself	Telugu	Special appearance
2007	Veerasamy		Tamil	
2008	Vaitheeswaran	Roopa	Tamil	
2008	Pandurangadu		Telugu	Special appearance
2008	Pandhayam	Herself	Tamil	Cameo appearance
2010	Kutty	Dancer on the train	Tamil	Special appearance
2011	Siruthai	Item girl	Tamil	Special appearance
2011	100% Love	Herself	Telugu	Special appearance
2011	Rivaaz	Chanda	Hindi	
2011	Puli Vesham		Tamil	Special appearance
2011	Vellore Maavattam		Tamil	Special appearance
2011	Pilla Zamindar	Herself	Telugu	Special appearance
2012	Love at First Sight		Hindi	
2012	Ishq Deewana		Hindi	
2013	Parari		Kannada	Special appearance
2013	Election		Kannada	Special appearance
2014	Ranathantra		Kannada	Special appearance
2014	Dhamak		Marathi	Debut S Special appearance
2016	Kya Kool Hain Hum 3	Maasi	Hindi	
2016	Ilamai Oonjal		Tamil	
2019	Dharmaprabhu		Tamil	
2019	Sitara		Bengali	
2024	Sur Lagu De		Marathi	

Television shows

- Fear Factor: Khatron Ke Khiladi 1 on Colors TV
- Dancing Queen on Colors TV
- Jodha Akbar on Zee TV
- MTV Fanaah on MTV India
- Adaalat on Sony Entertainment Television
- Sasural Simar Ka on Colors
- Maharakshak Aryan on Zee TV
