= Tamil Nadu Small Industries Corporation Limited =

Indian state government corporation

Tamil Nadu Small Industries Corporation Limited (TANSI)
- Native name: தமிழ்நாடு சிறுதொழில் வளர்ச்சிக் கழகம் (வரையறுக்கப்பட்டது) (டான்சி)
- Company type: A Government of Tamil Nadu Undertaking
- Industry: Small Scale
- Founded: 1 December 1965; 60 years ago
- Headquarters: Guindy, Chennai, Tamil Nadu, India
- Area served: Tamil Nadu
- Website: TANSI

Tamil Nadu Small Industries Corporation Limited (TANSI) (Tamil: தமிழ்நாடு சிறுதொழில் வளர்ச்சிக் கழகம் (வரையறுக்கப்பட்டது) (டான்சி)) is a state-government undertaking of Government of Tamil Nadu located in the Indian state of Tamil Nadu.

== Formation of TANSI ==
- The Tamil Nadu Small Industries Corporation Limited, popularly known as TANSI was formed on 1.12.1965 (registered under Companies Act, 1956) to take over the small scale units that were set up and run by the Department of Industries and Commerce, total numbered 64
- In next phase TANSI started some new units after formation
- In 1985 TANSI started Tamil Nadu Paints And Allied Products Limited (TAPAP)(a subsidiary company) with a Small Chemicals Unit in Ambttur, Thiruvallur for the need of Tamil Nadu Government & its organisation
- The TAPAP Ambttur Unit commenced production on 1 April 1986.

== TANSI Group Products ==
TANSI:

- Wooden & Steel Furniture Products
- Wooden & Steel Furnishing and Interior Decorations
- Metal Fabricated Products
- Engineering / Structural / Galvanizing / Boiler - Products and services
- Engineering / Tools / Foundry - Products and services
- Pumps & Spares and Street Light Poles
- Polish Chemicals

TAPAP:

- Paints

== TANSI Operation ==
Functioning Units of TANSI are:

=== TANSI Wooden Furniture Units ===
- Furniture Works, Guindy
- Furniture Works, Pudukkottai
- Furniture Works, Madurai
- Furniture Works, Krishnagiri
- Furniture & Engg. Works, Pettai.
- Furniture Works, Cuddalore.

=== TANSI Steel Furniture/ Fabrication Units ===
- Fabrication works, Palani
- Fabrication works, Vellore
- Fabrication Works, Rajapalayam

=== TANSI Structural Units ===
- Structural Units:
  - Structural & Galvanizing Works, Metturdam
  - Structural Works, Trichy
- Engineering Units:
  - Tool & Engineering Works, Madurai
  - Engineering Works, Thanjavur
  - Engineering works, Mayiladuthurai

=== TANSI Special Units ===
- Pump Unit, Ambattur
- Tool & Engg works, Trichy
- Polish Unit, Ambattur
- Watch Assembly Unit, Ooty

=== TANSI Project Cells ===
- Project Cell, Guindy
- Project Cell, Ambattur
- Project Cell, Mettur Dam
- Project Cell, Mayiladuthurai
- Project Cell, Thanjavur

=== TANSI Sales Centres ===
- Chennai
- Coimbatore
- Madurai
- Trichy

== TAPAP Operation ==
Tamil Nadu Paints & Allied Products Ltd is a subsidiary company of Tamil Nadu Small Industries Corporation Limited (TANSI). Tamil Nadu Paints & Allied Products Ltd is manufacturer of "ARASU" Brand Paint and Allied Products

- TAPAP Manufacturing Location - Ambattur, Tiruvallur District
