= Meera Nandan =

Indian actress

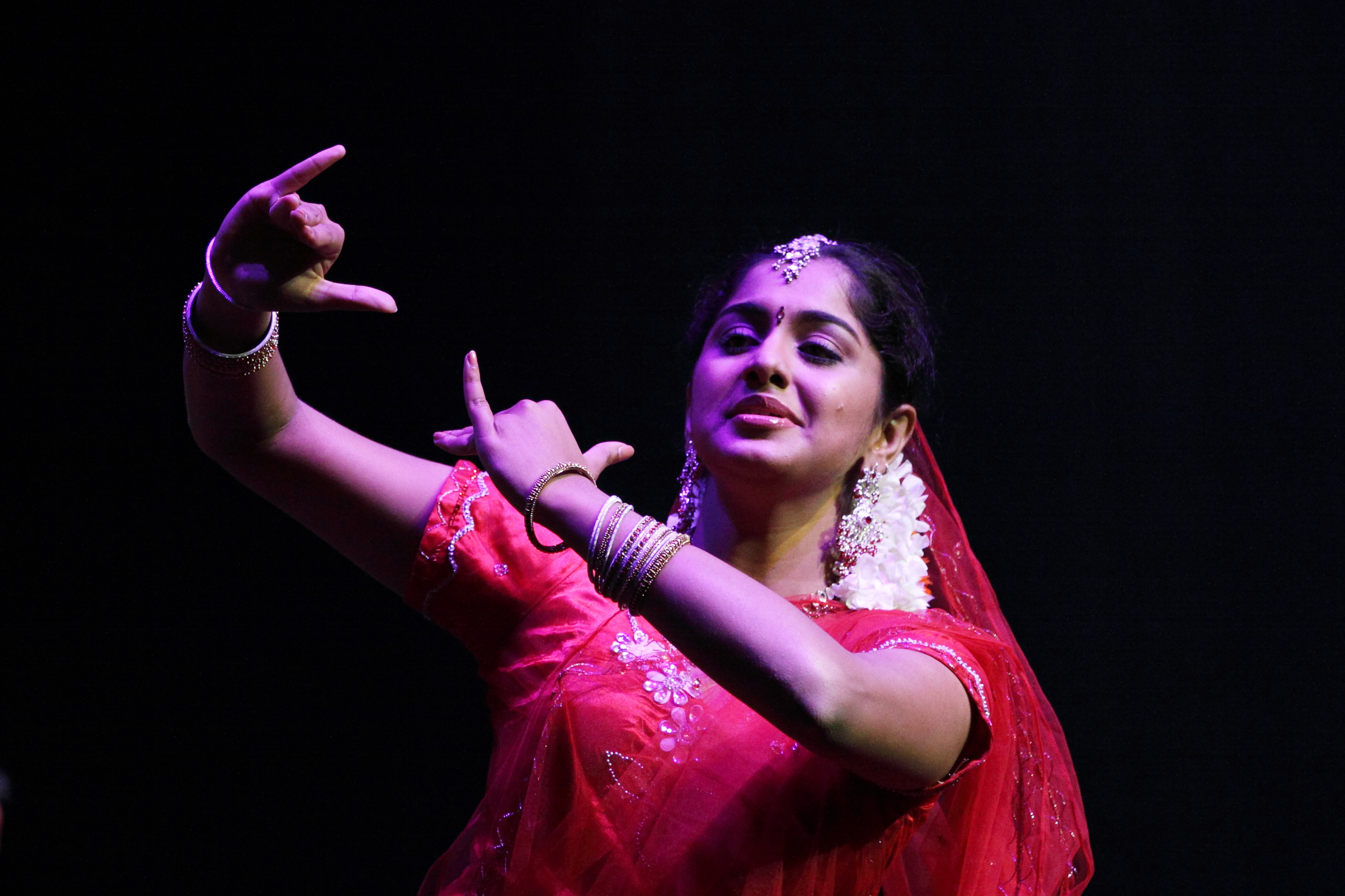
- Born: Meera Nandakumar; 26 November 1990 (age 35); Kochi, Kerala, India
- Occupations: Actor; radio jockey; model; TV host
- Years active: 2006–2018; 2023–2024
- Spouse: Sreeju (m. 2024)

Meera Nandan (born 26 November 1990) is an Indian radio jockey and actress who appears mainly in Malayalam films. She has acted in over 40 films.

== Early life ==
Meera Nandan was born as Meera Nandakumar on 26 November 1990 as the daughter of Nandakumar and Maya at Perandoor, Elamakkara, Kochi. She did her schooling in Bhavans Vidya Mandir, Elamakkara. After completing her degree in English literature from St. Teresa's College, Ernakulam, she pursued her master's degree in Mass Communication with Journalism through distant education from Manipal University. She is distantly related to former actress and classical dancer Divya Unni.

== Personal life ==
On 29 June 2024, Meera married Sreeju, who is an accountant by profession.

== Career ==
Meera first appearance before the camera was in an advertisement for Mohanlal's Taste Buds. In 2007, she auditioned as a contestant in Idea Star Singer aired on Asianet Television but was selected as an anchor for the programme. She anchored television programmes on Amrita TV and Jeevan TV as well.

She made her acting debut in Malayalam cinema the following year, playing the female lead in Lal Jose's Mulla. Lal Jose was looking for "a new face with a girl next door look" and Poornima, wife of actor Indrajith Sukumaran, thought that Meera suited the role and approached her. After discussing with her parents, she accepted the role of Lachi, a "bold, smart and outgoing girl", which won her accolades. The next year she made her Tamil cinema debut with Vaalmiki and quickly signed a few more Tamil films: K. T. Kunjumon's Kadhalukku Maranamillai, Ayyanar and Suriya Nagaram.

She debuted in Telugu cinema in 2011 with Jai Bolo Telangana. The Malayalam film, Seniors saw her playing the role of a villain, with Meera stating that the film was "a revelation even to me". Including Seniors she had four Malayalam releases in 2011, but she felt that it was not a good year for her as none of them helped her career. In 2013, she was first seen as a journalist in Lokpal. That year she also turned playback singer. She sang the romantic number "Mazhayude Ormakal" composed by Ratheesh Vegha for V. K. Prakash's Silence. Her debut Kannada film Karodpathi, for which she had begun shooting in 2012, then titled as Kotyadhipathi, released after a long delay in 2014. She played the role of a tribal girl in Black Forest, which won the National Film Award for Best Film on Environment Conservation/Preservation.

She was next seen playing a prominent role in Madhav Ramadasan's Apothecary. Her final release Mylanchi Monchulla Veedu in which she played a Muslim girl. 2015 she had next first release in three years, Sandamarutham. In Telugu, she has completed filming for Hitudu (earlier titled Gunde Ninda Gudigantalu), in which she will be seen as a tribal woman in three different stages, as a 14-year-old, as a 23-year-old and as a 35-year-old. She lent her voice for Taapsee's character in the film Doubles.

== Other Work ==
In 2014, she moved to Dubai to work as a Radio Jockey in Radio Red 94.7 FM. She, however, informed in social media that she will continue to work in films along with her job as RJ.

She has now joined Gold 101.3 FM in Ajman as RJ.

== Filmography ==
=== Films ===
Year	Film	Role	Language	Notes
2008	Mulla	Lachi	Malayalam	
2009	Currency	Rose	Malayalam	
2009	Valmiki	Vandhana	Tamil	
2009	Puthiya Mukham	Sreedevi	Malayalam	
2009	Kerala Cafe	James' sister	Malayalam	
2009	Patham Nilayile Theevandi	Indu	Malayalam	
2010	Pulliman	Radha	Malayalam	
2010	Elsamma Enna Aankutty	Jeni	Malayalam	
2010	Ayyanar	Anitha	Tamil	
2010	Oridathoru Postman	Usha	Malayalam	
2011	Jai Bolo Telangana	Sahaja	Telugu	
2011	Kathalukku Maranamillai	Rahul's lover	Tamil	
2011	Seniors	Lakshmi	Malayalam	
2011	Shankaranum Mohananum	Rajalakshmi	Malayalam	
2011	Ven Shankhu Pol	Aswathy (Achu)	Malayalam	
2011	Swapna Sanchari	Lakshmi	Malayalam	
2012	Padmasree Bharat Dr. Saroj Kumar	Actress	Malayalam	
2012	Sooriya Nagaram	Thamizhselvi	Tamil	
2012	Mallu Singh	Neethu	Malayalam	
2012	Madirasi	Bhama	Malayalam	
2012	Bhoomiyude Avakashikal	Saradha	Malayalam	
2013	Lokpal	Jain	Malayalam	
2013	Red Wine	Jasna	Malayalam	
2013	Yathra Thudarunnu	Chandrika	Malayalam	
2013	Aattakatha	Sethulakhsmi	Malayalam	
2013	Tourist Home	Reshma	Malayalam	
2013	Kadal Kadannoru Mathukkutty	Kunjumol	Malayalam	
2014	Black Forest	Cheera	Malayalam	
2014	Karoodpathi	Vidya	Kannada	
2014	Apothecary	Daisy	Malayalam	
2014	Mylanchi Monchulla Veedu	Shahina	Malayalam	
2015	Sandamarutham	Maha	Tamil	
2015	Kaattum Mazhayum	Anjaly	Malayalam	
2015	Hitudu	Abhilasha	Telugu	
2016	Naanu Nam Hudgi		Kannada	
2016	Angane Thanne Nethave Anchettennam Pinnale	Anu	Malayalam	
2016	Ner Mugam	Ramya	Tamil	
2017	4th Degree		Telugu	
2017	Gold Coins	Smrithi teacher	Malayalam	
2023	Ennalum Ente Aliya	Jesna	Malayalam	

Music albums

Year	Title	Language	Notes
2006	Pranayathin Jalakam - album	Malayalam	
	Mookambika - album	Malayalam	Actress & Singer
	Devi Mahatmyamn- album	Malayalam	singer
	Varavarnini - album	Malayalam	singer
	Vara Roopini - album	Malayalam	singer
	Devi Theertham - album	Malayalam	singer
2018	Doore Doore - Musical video	Malayalam	
2020	Vaseegara × Zara Zara	Tamil/Hindi	Actress & Singer

As singer

- Silence (2013)

As dubbing artiste

- Doubles for Taapsee Pannu

== Television ==
Year	Show	Role	Channel	Language
2023	Cook With Comedy	Host	Asianet	Malayalam
2017–2018	Lal Salam	Host with Mohanlal	Amrita TV	Malayalam
2017	Asianet Film Awards	Host with Govind Padmasoorya	Asianet	Malayalam
2016	Sell Me the Answer	Participant	Asianet	Malayalam
2014	Page 3	Model	Kappa TV	Malayalam
2011	Vivel Big Break	Judge	Surya TV	Malayalam
2011	Onakkodi	Host	Surya TV	Malayalam
2008	Manjil Virinja Tharam	Co Host	Kairali TV	Malayalam
2007	Idea Star Singer	Co Host	Asianet	Malayalam
2007	Veedu	Actress	Surya TV	Malayalam

== Awards and nominations ==
Year	Award	Category	Film	Result
2007	Kerala State Television Awards	Best Second Actress	Veedu	Won
2008	Filmfare Awards South	Best Female Debut	Mulla	Won
2008	Filmfare Awards South	Best Actress - Malayalam	Mulla	Nominated
2009	Asianet Film Awards	Best New Face of the Year (Female)	Mulla	Won
2009	AMMA Awards	Best Supporting Actress	Puthiya Mukham	Won
