= E. V. Velu =

Indian senior politician (born 1951)

E.V. Velu

Cabinet Minister Government of Tamil Nadu
- In office 7 May 2021 – 5 May 2026
- Minister: Minister of Public Works
- Governor: Banwarilal Purohit
- Chief minister: M. K. Stalin
- Preceded by: Edappadi K. Palaniswami
- Succeeded by: Aadhav Arjuna
- In office 13 May 2006 – 15 May 2011
- Minister: Minister for Food and Civil Supplies
- Chief minister: M. Karunanidhi

Member of the Tamil Nadu Legislative Assembly
- Incumbent
- Assumed office 13 May 2011
- Preceded by: K. Pitchandi
- Constituency: Tiruvannamalai
- In office 13 May 2001 – 13 May 2011
- Preceded by: K. Manivarma
- Succeeded by: Constituency Abolished
- Constituency: Thandarambattu
- In office 31 December 1984 – 22 January 1988
- Preceded by: D. Venugopal
- Succeeded by: D. Ponnumudi
- Constituency: Thandarambattu

Personal details
- Born: Ethirajulu Vajjaravelu; 15 March 1951 (age 75) Koovanur, Manalurpet, Kallakurichi, Madras State, (now Tamil Nadu), India
- Party: Dravida Munnetra Kazhagam (from 1997)
- Other political affiliations: All India Anna Dravida Munnetra Kazhagam (1972–1997)
- Spouse: Sankari Velu (Known as Jeeva Velu)
- Children: 1.Dr.E.V.V.Kamban (State Vice President of DMK Medical Wing); 2.Er.E.V.V.Kumaran
- Parent(s): Ethirajulu (Father); Saraswati Ammal (Mother)
- Relatives: Manogaran (Brother)
- Education: Annamalai University (MA, History)
- Occupation: Politician, Founder of Saraswathy Ammal Educational Trust

Ethirajulu Vajjaravelu or E. V. Velu (born 15 March 1951) is an Indian senior politician who has been serving as the Minister of Public Works, Highways and Minor Ports in the M. K. Stalin ministry of the state of Tamil Nadu since 2021.2026 He formerly served as the Minister for Food and Civil Supplies in the state under M. Karunanidhi (2006–2011).

== Early life ==
Velu was born in Koovanur near Manalurpet in Kallakurichi district in a Telugu Gavara Naidu family on 15 March 1951. His parents Ethirajulu and Saraswati Ammal were farmers. He holds a master's degree in history from Annamalai University. Velu started out as a pump repairman but later joined a bus company named as Dhamodharan Bus Services in the Tiruvannamalai district as a bus conductor. An admirer of M. G. Ramachandran, he became an AIADMK member on its inception, becoming its deputy organizer for Thandarambattu.

He was involved in film distribution along with politics and acted in a couple of films like Thilakam.

He is member of Saraswathi Ammal Educational Trust, Tiruvannamalai; Arunai Medical College and Hospital; Arunai Engineering College; Saraswathi Ammal Educational Trust which is managed by his wife Sankari Velu.

== Political career ==
He has served as a Minister for Public Works and Highways Minister of Tamil nadu.

He formerly served as the Minister for Food and Civil Supplies in the state under M. Karunanidhi (2006–2011).

Velu has been elected to the Tamil Nadu legislative assembly as All India Anna Dravida Munnetra Kazhagam (AIADMK) party candidate from Thandarambattu constituency, in 1984. In 1997, he joined DMK (at a time when the MGR Anna Dravida Munnetra Kazhagam split from the AIADMK to ally with the BJP) and got elected from the same constituency in 2001 and 2006. He was subsequently elected twice from Tiruvannamalai constituency as a Dravida Munnetra Kazhagam candidate in 2011 and 2016 and 2021.

== Controversies ==
=== "India" comment ===
After the DMK joined the I.N.D.I.A political alliance, Velu gave a speech regarding the word "India", and was questioned about the impact the word had on the people of Tamil Nadu.

Translation of speech:

“What is the state today? The word India never had any impact on us. When has India had an impact on us? I’m making an open statement. There wasn’t any such impact on us. I'm talking about some time ago. Where did we have an impact? There was no impact. India is someplace in North India. We belong to Tamil Nadu. If possible, we have to create a Dravida Nadu. Our thought process was going in that direction.”

Velu later said the BJP had misquoted his statements, after the party raised objections against the speech in the Lok Sabha. He clarified that he was only talking about how some people in the state had perceived the word in the past, "I was explaining what the situation was earlier and what the situation is now. I mentioned that once upon we did not have impactful feelings towards “India” - but that was once upon a time," he said. Further adding that the current DMK Dravidian ideology has the responsibility to protect India and M. K. Stalin plays a crucial role in it.

== Elections Contested and results ==
Elections	Constituency	Party	Result
1984	Thandarambattu	ADMK	Won
2001	Thandarambattu	DMK	Won
2006	Thandarambattu	DMK	Won
2011	Tiruvannamalai	DMK	Won
2016	Tiruvannamalai	DMK	Won
2021	Tiruvannamalai	DMK	Won
2026	Tiruvannamalai	DMK	Won
