= D. Vijayaraj =

Former legislative member of Tamil Nadu assembly

Member of the Madras Legislative Assembly
- In office 1967–1971
- Preceded by: P. U. Shanmugam
- Succeeded by: P. U. Shanmugam
- Constituency: Tiruvannamalai

Personal details
- Born: 15 February 1932
- Party: Indian National Congress
- Profession: Bus Owner

D. Vijayaraj is an Indian politician and a former member of the Tamil Nadu Legislative Assembly. He hails from Tiruvannamalai town in Tiruvannamalai district. He studied at Tiruvannamalai Municipal High School. Belonging to the Indian National Congress party, he contested in the 1967 Tamil Nadu Legislative Assembly elections from the Tiruvannamalai constituency and won, becoming a Member of the Legislative Assembly (MLA).

== Electoral performance ==
=== 1967 ===
1967 Madras Legislative Assembly election: Tiruvannamalai
Party	Candidate	Votes	%	±%
INC	D. Vijayaraj	38,153	49.39	−0.68
DMK	P. U. Shanmugam	34,968	45.26	−2.31
Independent	M. Arumugam	4,134	5.35	New
Margin of victory		3,185	4.12	1.63
Turnout		77,255	84.43	10.86
Registered electors		94,545		
INC hold		Swing	-0.68	
