= S. Gokula Indira =

Indian politician

S.Gokula Indira

Minister of Handlooms and Textiles
- In office 21 May 2014 – 22 May 2016
- Chief Minister: J.Jayalalithaa; O. Panneerselvam; J. Jayalalithaa
- Preceded by: S. Sundararaj
- Succeeded by: O. S. Manian

Minister for Tourism and Tourism Development
- In office 16 May 2011 – 27 February 2013
- Chief Minister: J.Jayalalithaa
- Preceded by: N. Suresh Rajan
- Succeeded by: P. Chendur Pandian

Member of the Tamil Nadu Legislative Assembly
- In office 16 May 2011 – 22 May 2016
- Preceded by: Arcot N. Veeraswami
- Succeeded by: M. K. Mohan
- Constituency: Anna Nagar

State Secretary of the AIADMK Women's Wing
- In office 6 January 2016 – 8 June 2016
- General Secretary: J. Jayalalithaa
- Preceded by: Sasikala Pushpa
- Succeeded by: Vijila Sathyananth
- In office 28 January 2010 – 28 May 2013
- General Secretary: J. Jayalalithaa
- Preceded by: B. Valarmathi
- Succeeded by: Sasikala Pushpa
- In office 19 November 2001 – 1 January 2007
- General Secretary: J. Jayalalithaa
- Preceded by: Valarmathi Jebaraj
- Succeeded by: B. Valarmathi

Personal details
- Born: 1 June 1966 (age 60)
- Party: All India Anna Dravida Munnetra Kazhagam
- Spouse: A. R. Chandrasekhar (m. 1990; died 2025)
- Occupation: Lawyer; politician

S. Gokula Indira is an Indian politician and was a member of the 14th Tamil Nadu Legislative Assembly from the Anna Nagar constituency. She represented the All India Anna Dravida Munnetra Kazhagam party. She earlier served as Rajya Sabha MP.

She was inducted into Jayalalithaa ministry as Minister of Tourism in 2011. However, in February 2013, she was sacked from the Cabinet, possibly due to underperformance, only to be reinducted as Minister of Handlooms and Textiles in May 2014 in yet another reshuffle.

Indira lost in the elections of 2016 despite her party retaining power. Her constituency was won by M. K. Mohan. She was one among the incumbent 13 ADMK ministers who lost the 2016 polls.

== Electoral performance ==
Election	Constituency	Political party	Result	Vote %	Opposition			Ref
Election	Constituency	Political party	Result	Vote %	Candidate	Political party	Vote %	Ref
2011	Anna Nagar	AIADMK	Won	58.67%	V. K. Arivazhagan	INC	34.54%	
2016	Anna Nagar	AIADMK	Lost	40.95%	M. K. Mohan	DMK	41.59%	
2021	Anna Nagar	AIADMK	Lost	32.17%	M. K. Mohan	DMK	48.95%	-
2026	Anna Nagar	AIADMK	Lost	21.05%	V. K. Ramkumar	TVK	43.70%	-
