= Vijila Sathyananth =

Indian politician and educationalist

Vijila Sathyanath

MP of Rajya Sabha for Tamil Nadu
- In office 3 April 2014 – 2 April 2020
- Constituency: Tamil Nadu

State Secretary of the AIADMK Women's Wing
- In office 8 June 2016 – 8 July 2021
- General Secretary: J. Jayalalithaa
- Preceded by: S. Gokula Indira
- Succeeded by: B. Valarmathi

Mayor of Tirunelveli Municipal Corporation
- In office 25 October 2011 – 23 January 2014
- Preceded by: A. L. Subramanian
- Succeeded by: E. Bhuvaneswari

Personal details
- Party: DMK
- Other political affiliations: AIADMK (1998-2021)

Vijila Sathyananth is an Indian politician, Educationalist and former Mayor of Tirunelveli Municipal Corporation. She represents Dravida Munnetra Kazhagam party. She also represents as a member in the party's general council. She is also a member in Rajya Sabha from 2014-20. She joined the DMK.

She belongs to Christian CSI Pillai community. She served in AIADMK from 1998 to 2021, when she switched to DMK.
