= Tirupattur Lok Sabha constituency =

Lok Sabha Constituency in Tamil Nadu

Coordinates: 12.5°N 78.6°E

Tiruppattur
- Former Lok Sabha constituency
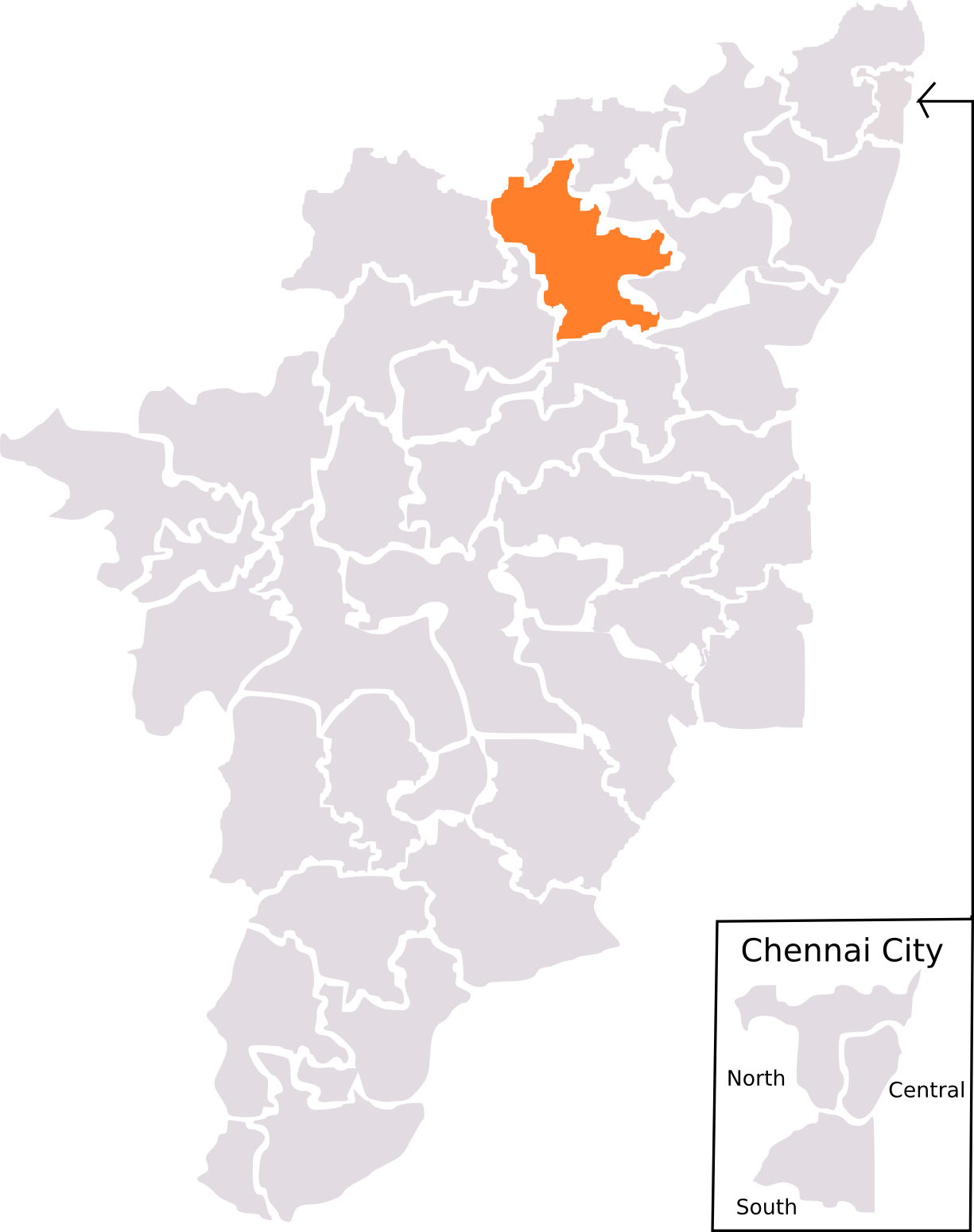
- Tirupattur constituency, 1971 delimitation.

Constituency details
- Country: India
- Region: South India
- State: Tamil Nadu
- Assembly constituencies: 1. Vaniyambadi; 2. Natrampalli; 3. Tiruppattur; 4. Chengam (SC); 5. Thandarambattu; 6. Kalasapakkam
- Established: 1971
- Abolished: 2009
- Total electors: 12,13,662
- Reservation: None

Tiruppattur was a Lok Sabha constituency in Tamil Nadu. After delimitation in 2009, it is now a defunct constituency.

== Assembly segments ==
Tiruppattur Lok Sabha constituency is composed of the following assembly segments:

1. Vaniyambadi (moved to Vellore constituency)
2. Natrampalli (defunct)
3. Tiruppattur (moved to Tiruvannamalai constituency)
4. Chengam (SC) (moved to Tiruvannamalai constituency)
5. Thandarambattu (defunct)
6. Kalasapakkam (moved to Tiruvannamalai constituency)

== Members of Parliament ==
Year	Winner	Party
1971	C. K. Chinnaraji Gounder	Dravida Munnetra Kazhagam
1977	C. N. Viswanathan	Dravida Munnetra Kazhagam
1980	S. Murugaiyan	Dravida Munnetra Kazhagam
1984	A. Jayamohan	Indian National Congress
1989	A. Jayamohan	Indian National Congress
1991	A. Jayamohan	Indian National Congress
1996	D. Venugopal	Dravida Munnetra Kazhagam
1998	D. Venugopal	Dravida Munnetra Kazhagam
1999	D. Venugopal	Dravida Munnetra Kazhagam
2004	D. Venugopal	Dravida Munnetra Kazhagam

== Election results ==
Vote share of Winning candidates
2004	58.47%
1999	47.94%
1998	47.88%
1996	61.55%
1991	60.12%
1989	55.79%
1984	55.59%
1980	62.84%
1977	60.06%
1971	57.65%
1967	54.21%
1962	51.59%
1957	44.55%

=== General Elections 2004 ===
2004 Indian general election : Tiruppattur
Party	Candidate	Votes	%	±%
DMK	D. Venugopal	453,786	58.47%	10.54%
AIADMK	K. G. Subramani	2,72,884	35.16%	−9.55%
JD(U)	P. Rajendiran	12,327	1.59%	
BSP	P. Rajendiran	8,284	1.07%	
Independent	C. P. Radhakrishnan	6,171	0.80%	
JP	P. Vijayakumar	4,171	0.54%	
Independent	G. Ramu	4,117	0.53%	
Independent	P. Venugopal	3,733	0.48%	
Margin of victory		1,80,902	23.31%	20.08%
Turnout		7,76,085	63.95%	−1.22%
Registered electors		12,13,662		6.01%
DMK hold		Swing	10.54%	

=== General Elections 1999 ===
1999 Indian general election : Tiruppattur
Party	Candidate	Votes	%	±%
DMK	D. Venugopal	350,703	47.94%	−13.61%
AIADMK	A. R. Rajendran	3,27,090	44.71%	
TMC(M)	A. Jayamohan	51,932	7.10%	
Margin of victory		23,613	3.23%	3.19%
Turnout		7,31,615	65.17%	−3.82%
Registered electors		11,44,891		4.68%
DMK hold		Swing	-13.61%	

=== General Elections 1998 ===
1998 Indian general election : Tiruppattur
Party	Candidate	Votes	%	±%
DMK	D. Venugopal	322,990	47.88%	
AIADMK	S. Krishnamoorthy	3,22,716	47.83%	
INC	R. Kannabiran	28,095	4.16%	
Margin of victory		274	0.04%	−34.29%
Turnout		6,74,645	63.99%	−4.99%
Registered electors		10,93,701		3.00%
DMK hold		Swing	-13.67%	

=== General Elections 1996 ===
1996 Indian general election : Tiruppattur
Party	Candidate	Votes	%	±%
DMK	D. Venugopal	430,766	61.55%	30.97%
INC	Era. Anbarasu	1,90,502	27.22%	−32.90%
PMK	S. Natarajan	35,976	5.14%	
MDMK	G. Vanagamudi	23,667	3.38%	
BJP	S. Vijayan	10,555	1.51%	−0.52%
Margin of victory		2,40,264	34.33%	4.79%
Turnout		6,99,892	68.98%	1.11%
Registered electors		10,61,817		7.74%
DMK gain from INC		Swing	1.43%	

=== General Elections 1991 ===
1991 Indian general election : Tiruppattur
Party	Candidate	Votes	%	±%
INC	A. Jayamohan	387,649	60.12%	4.33%
DMK	K. C. Alagiri	1,97,188	30.58%	−5.24%
PMK	D. P. Chandran	40,289	6.25%	
BJP	V. Ananthasayanam	13,097	2.03%	
Margin of victory		1,90,461	29.54%	9.57%
Turnout		6,44,841	67.87%	−1.26%
Registered electors		9,85,576		−0.66%
INC hold		Swing	4.33%	

=== General Elections 1989 ===
1989 Indian general election : Tiruppattur
Party	Candidate	Votes	%	±%
INC	A. Jayamohan	376,733	55.79%	0.20%
DMK	K. C. Alagiri	2,41,900	35.82%	2.94%
Independent	S. Babu	37,057	5.49%	
Margin of victory		1,34,833	19.97%	−2.74%
Turnout		6,75,288	69.14%	−6.65%
Registered electors		9,92,148		32.09%
INC hold		Swing	0.20%	

=== General Elections 1984 ===
1984 Indian general election : Tiruppattur
Party	Candidate	Votes	%	±%
INC	A. Jayamohan	298,159	55.59%	
DMK	M. Abdul Lathief	1,76,372	32.88%	−29.95%
Independent	P. Venkatesan	51,157	9.54%	
Independent	T. C. Thangaraj	10,684	1.99%	
Margin of victory		1,21,787	22.71%	−3.73%
Turnout		5,36,372	75.79%	11.05%
Registered electors		7,51,122		9.35%
INC gain from DMK		Swing	-7.25%	

=== General Elections 1980 ===
1980 Indian general election : Tiruppattur
Party	Candidate	Votes	%	±%
DMK	S. Murugaiyan	274,216	62.84%	2.78%
AIADMK	A. R. Shahul Hameed	1,58,855	36.40%	−0.63%
Independent	A. A. Rasheed	3,322	0.76%	
Margin of victory		1,15,361	26.44%	3.41%
Turnout		4,36,393	64.74%	−2.28%
Registered electors		6,86,891		4.63%
DMK hold		Swing	2.78%	

=== General Elections 1977 ===
1977 Indian general election : Tiruppattur
Party	Candidate	Votes	%	±%
DMK	C. N. Viswanathan	257,322	60.06%	2.41%
AIADMK	C. K. Chinnaraje Gounder	1,58,656	37.03%	
Independent	N. Raji Naidu	3,646	0.85%	
Independent	D. Rajan	3,553	0.83%	
Independent	M. Ramaswamy	2,813	0.66%	
Margin of victory		98,666	23.03%	7.74%
Turnout		4,28,433	67.03%	−5.71%
Registered electors		6,56,520		27.22%
DMK hold		Swing	2.41%	

=== General Elections 1971 ===
1971 Indian general election : Tiruppattur
Party	Candidate	Votes	%	±%
DMK	C. K. Chinnaraji Gounder	207,562	57.65%	3.44%
SWA	N. Parthasarathy	1,52,499	42.35%	
Margin of victory		55,063	15.29%	6.88%
Turnout		3,60,061	72.73%	−2.15%
Registered electors		5,16,063		7.92%
DMK hold		Swing	3.44%	

=== General Elections 1967 ===
1967 Indian general election : Tiruppattur
Party	Candidate	Votes	%	±%
DMK	R. Muthu Gounder	188,309	54.21%	2.62%
INC	T. A. Wahid	1,59,078	45.79%	5.63%
Margin of victory		29,231	8.41%	−3.01%
Turnout		3,47,387	74.89%	7.37%
Registered electors		4,78,183		5.46%
DMK hold		Swing	2.62%	

=== General Elections 1962 ===
1962 Indian general election : Tiruppattur
Party	Candidate	Votes	%	±%
DMK	R. Muthu Gounder	151,938	51.59%	
INC	Duraiswami Goundan	1,18,303	40.17%	−4.38%
We Tamil	Siva Prakasam	11,372	3.86%	
Independent	Abdul Kareem	8,457	2.87%	
Independent	V. M. Chinnaswami	4,454	1.51%	
Margin of victory		33,635	11.42%	−6.44%
Turnout		2,94,524	67.51%	29.14%
Registered electors		4,53,447		8.34%
DMK gain from INC		Swing	7.04%	

=== General Elections 1957 ===
1957 Indian general election : Tiruppattur
Party	Candidate	Votes	%	±%
INC	A. Duraisami Gounder	71,564	44.55%	
Independent	C. P. Chitrarasu	42,875	26.69%	
Independent	S. S. V. Govindasami Chetty	22,867	14.24%	
Independent	Krishnasami Iyer	8,639	5.38%	
Independent	V. Rangasami Gounder	8,509	5.30%	
Independent	D. Vardarajan	6,175	3.84%	
Independent	R. Muthu Gounder	0	0.00%	
Margin of victory		28,689	17.86%	
Turnout		1,60,629	38.38%	
Registered electors		4,18,543		
INC win (new seat)				

== See also ==
- Tirupattur
- List of constituencies of the Lok Sabha
