= A. Jayamohan =

Indian politician

Adikesavan Jayamohan was an Indian politician and former Member of Parliament elected from Tamil Nadu. He was elected to the Lok Sabha from Tiruppattur constituency as an Indian National Congress candidate in the 1984, 1989 and 1991 elections.

He died near Ambur on the Chennai-Bangalore highway, in a road accident on 25 April 2010.
