= S. M. Ramachandran =

Indian politician

S. M. Ramachandran is an Indian politician and former Member of the Legislative Assembly of Tamil Nadu. He was elected to the Tamil Nadu legislative assembly as a Dravida Munnetra Kazhagam candidate from Anna Nagar constituency in 1984 election.

== Electoral performance ==
Election	Constituency	Political party	Result	Vote %	Opposition			Ref
Election	Constituency	Political party	Result	Vote %	Candidate	Political party	Vote %	Ref
1984	Anna Nagar	DMK	Won	52.59%	V. Kothadaraman	AIADMK	46.22%	
1991	Anna Nagar	DMK	Lost	36.58%	A. Chellakumar	INC	57.29%	
