= Death and state funeral of J. Jayalalithaa =

Death and state funeral of the 5th Chief Minister of Tamil Nadu

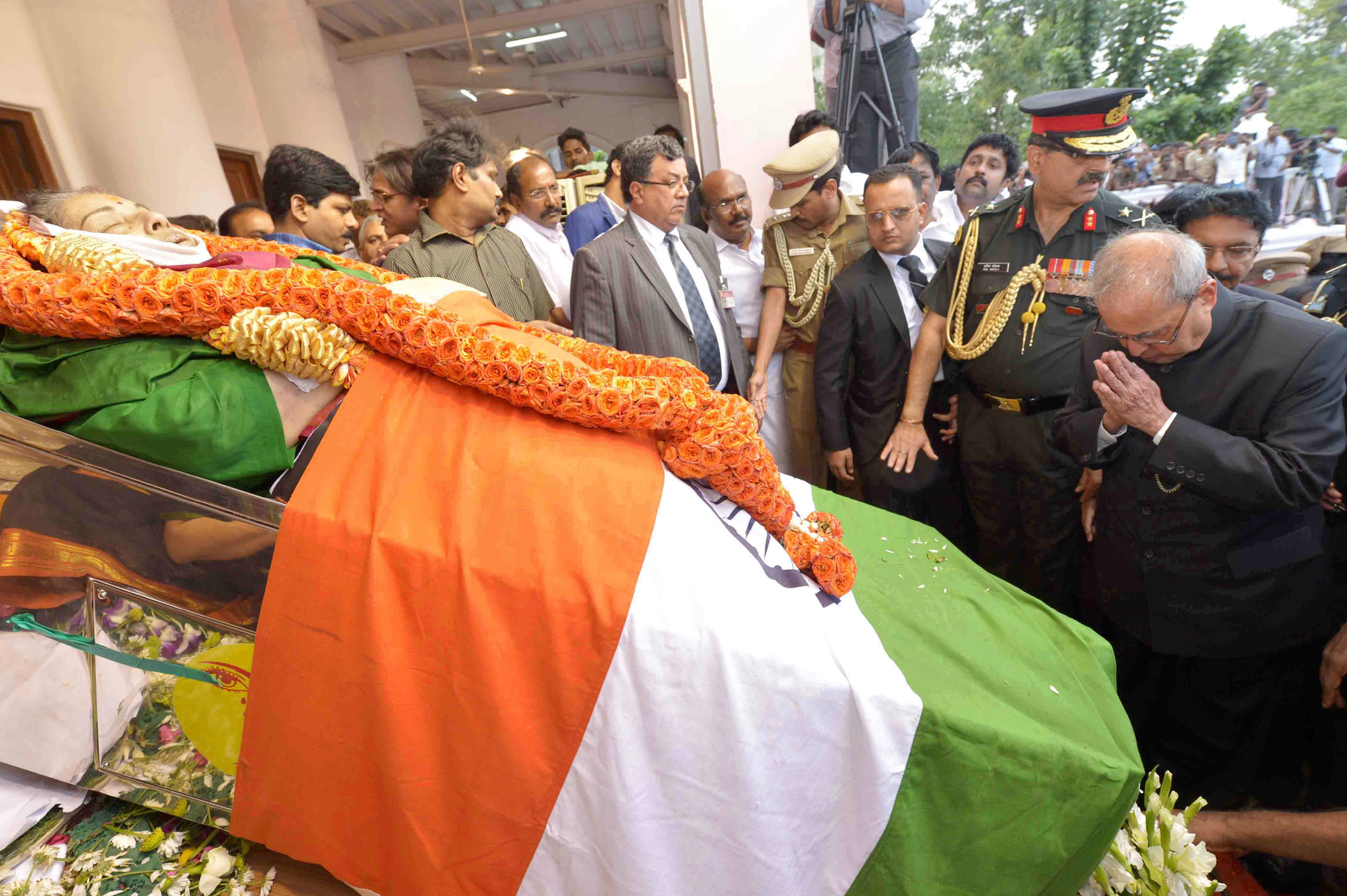
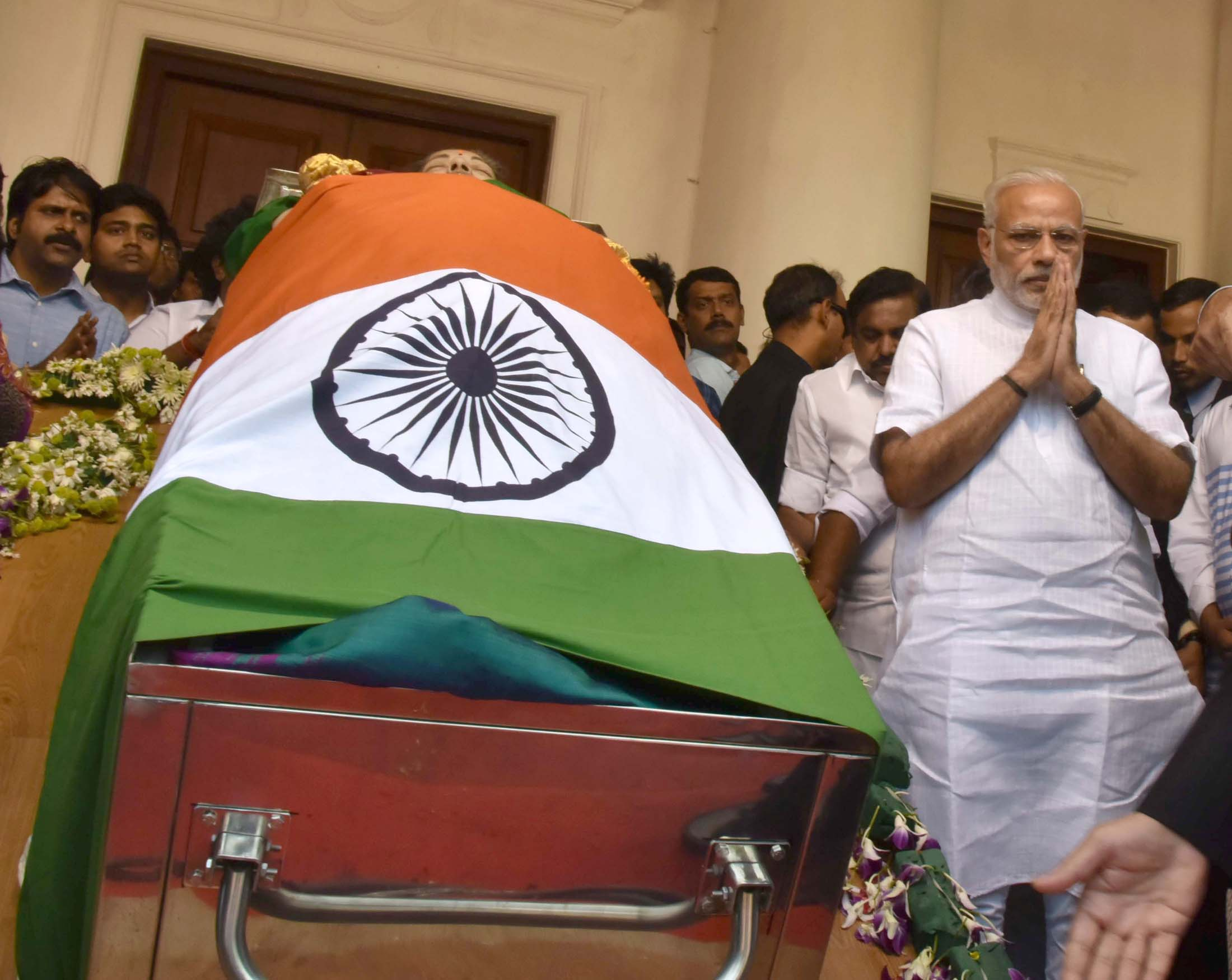
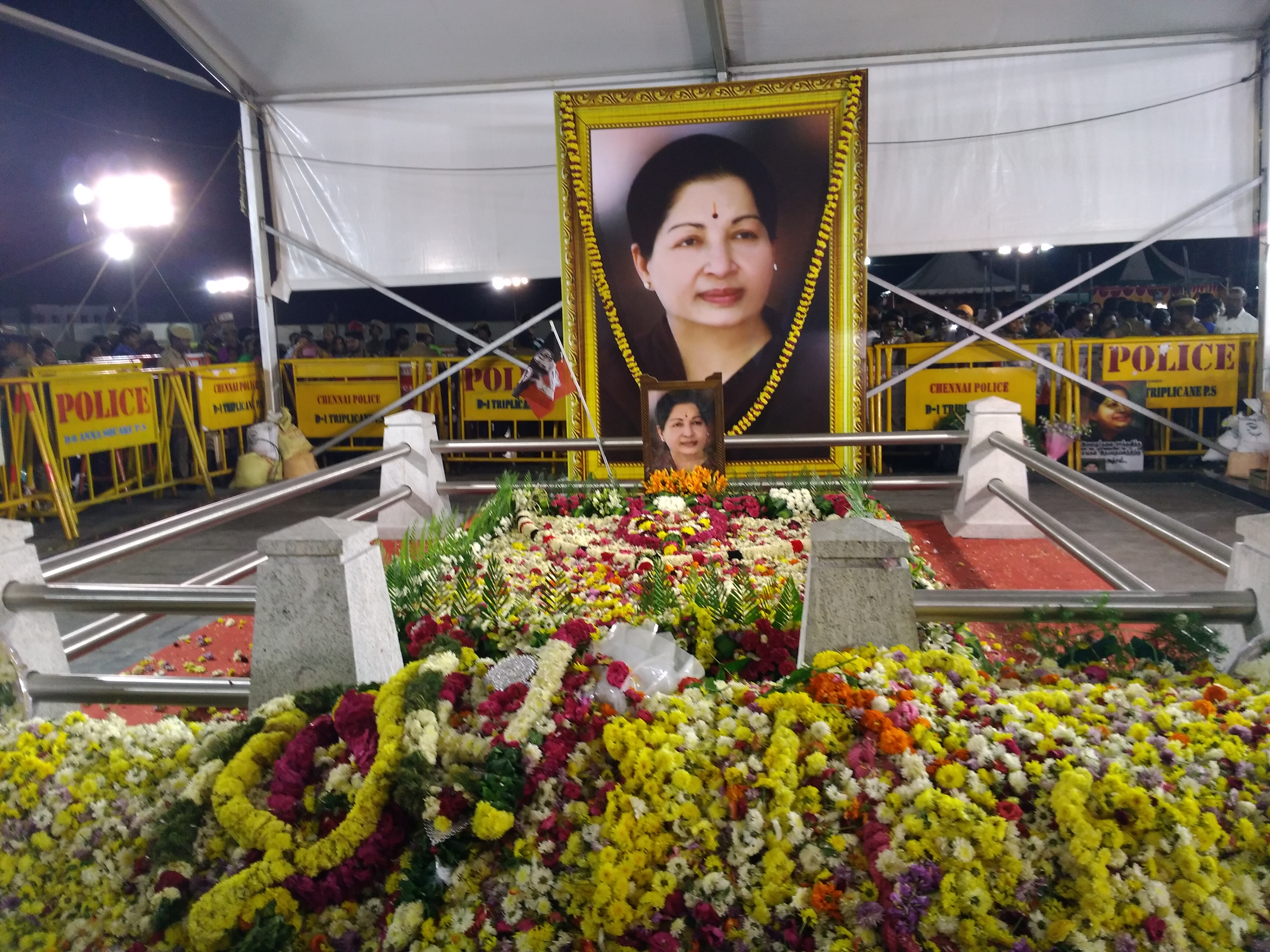
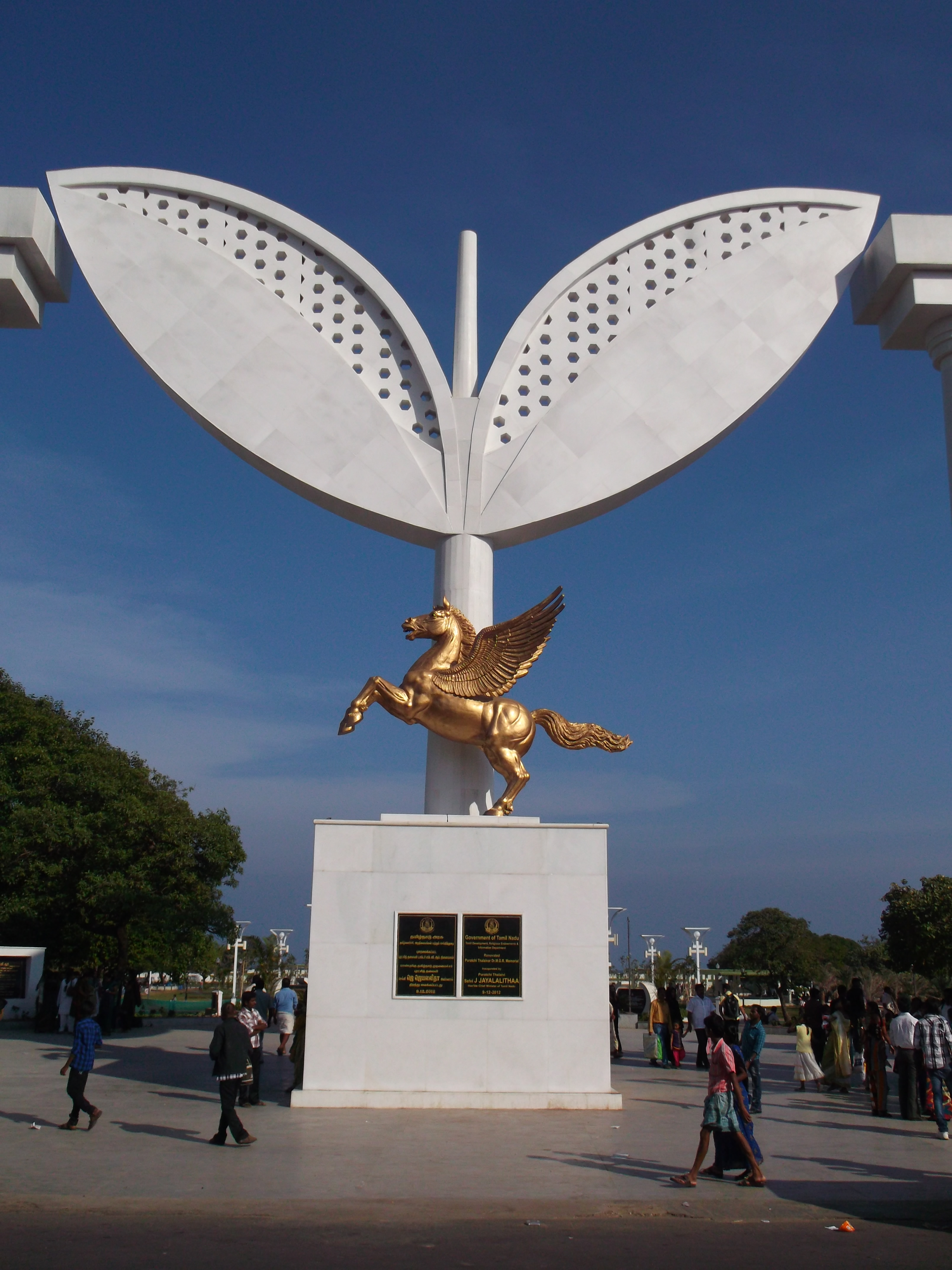
- Top to bottom, left to right: 1. President Pranab Mukherjee paid tributes to the mortal remains of J. Jayalalithaa; 2. Prime Minister Narendra Modi pays tributes to J. Jayalalithaa; 3. Burial Site of the Chief Minister of Tamil Nadu J. Jayalalitha; 4. Entrance of the resting place of J. Jayalalithaa at Marina beach
- Date: 5 December 2016, at 23:30 (IST); (death); 6 December 2016; (state funeral and burial)
- Location: Apollo Hospitals, Chennai; (death); Rajaji Hall, Chennai; (lying-in-state); M.G.R. and Amma Memorial, Chennai; (resting place); 13°3′47.502″N 80°15′5.7024″E
- Cause: Cardiac arrest

On 5 December 2016, at 23:30 IST, J. Jayalalithaa, Chief Minister of Tamil Nadu and the longest-serving general secretary of the All India Anna Dravida Munnetra Kazhagam, died of cardiac arrest in Chennai, Tamil Nadu, at the age of 68. Jayalalithaa's death was publicly announced at 00:15 on 6 December 2016. She was succeeded by her finance minister, O. Panneerselvam.

Government of India declared a one-day national mourning with the national flag in all government buildings flying at half-mast. Government of Tamil Nadu observed a seven-day state mourning period from 6 to 12 December 2016. Jayalalithaa's's lying in state took place in Rajaji Hall on 6 December 2016, during which time an estimated 1,000,000 people queued to pay their respects. It became one of the notable funerals in the world.

The state funeral service was held, and Jayalalithaa was buried next to her mentor M. G. Ramachandran's cemetery at the M.G.R. and Amma Memorial Complex later that evening.

== Background ==
On 22 September 2016, at around 10:00 p.m., the Apollo Hospitals emergency helpline received a call from Jayalalithaa's residence at Poes Garden reporting that she was unwell. Upon arrival, the medical team found that she was intermittently unresponsive, experiencing breathlessness, and had a critically low oxygen saturation level of approximately 48%. Jayalalithaa was admitted to Apollo Hospitals in Chennai at around 22:25 IST at night, reportedly suffering from an infection and acute dehydration. She received immediate treatment in the emergency department, including non-invasive ventilation, diuretics, empirical antibiotics, bronchodilators, and intravenous insulin infusion. During her hospitalization, she was treated by a team of 18 Apollo doctors, with additional consultations from specialists including an AIIMS team led by G. C. Khilnani, UK intensivist Richard Beale, and experts from Tata Memorial Hospital, P. D. Hinduja Hospital, Johns Hopkins Hospital, and other international institution. Her official duties were handed over to her minister O. Panneerselvam on 12 October 2016, though she continued to remain as the chief minister of the state.

A Ray of hope

“I came to inquire about her health as the Chief Minister of Tamil Nadu and as the senior artist (Mootha Kalaivani) of the field of arts to which I belong. Given the struggles she has faced, I am confident that she will recover through medical strength and mental fortitude.”

— Lyricist Vairamuthu, during his visit to inquire about Jayalalithaa's health, Thursday, 27 October 2016

She was also said to be suffering from a severe pulmonary infection and septicaemia, which were cured. On 19 November 2016, she was shifted from the ICU to a private room in the normal ward of Apollo Hospital after nearly two months of treatment.

On 3 December, she was reported to be fully conscious and able to sit in a chair for about 20 minutes, although she was unable to stand because of neuromuscular weakness. On 4 December 2016, she was re-admitted to the intensive care unit after suffering a cardiac arrest around 16:45 on the evening. Her condition deteriorated despite advanced life support. The hospital released a press statement stating that her condition was "very critical" and that she was on life support. On the same night, Keeping in mind critical condition of Jayalalithaa, DGP of the state has ordered the force on high alert to avoid any kind of untoward incident which may arise due to her highly emotional supporters and asked all police officers, personnel to report for duty by 7:00 IST on December 5. At 3:30 IST on December 5, She showed 'Intrinsic heart rhythm'. Doctors also observed at 16:30 IST on December 5, 2016, was considered a “sign of life” that made the hospital keep her connected to the ECMO device longer.

At around 17:30 IST on the evening of December 5, Thanthi TV, then headed by Rangaraj Pandey aired a flash report stating that Jayalalithaa had died. Following the report, several South Indian news outlets, including Sun TV, Jaya TV, the official television channel associated with the AIADMK and Puthiya Thalaimurai, published alerts and reports announcing her death, although no official confirmation had been issued by Apollo Hospitals or the AIADMK. Amid the chaos, desperate AIADMK cadres smashed the barricades that had been erected outside the hospital. Around 17:45 IST, the AIADMK flag at the party headquarters in Royapettah was lowered to half-mast, further contributing to speculation about her condition. National media organisations, including India Today, subsequently reported the news, citing Tamil media outlets. The reports were later contradicted by Apollo Hospitals, which issued a statement approximately 30 minutes after the initial Jaya TV report, stating that Jayalalithaa's condition remained grave but that she was still alive. The hospital added that a team of doctors from Apollo Hospitals and AIIMS continued to provide life-saving treatment. The television channels that had carried the reports withdrew or corrected their death alerts. Jaya TV also removed the erroneous report, although its management subsequently denied having broadcast the death announcement. Shortly after 18:00 IST, the AIADMK flag at the party headquarters was raised again. Following the hospital's clarification, the situation outside Apollo Hospital, where Jayalalithaa was undergoing treatment, eased. However, Thanthi TV's office became the target of angry supporters, amid criticism of the channel's reporting of her purported death.

Following the cardiac arrest, A neurological examination on 5 December revealed brainstem dysfunction, after which the treating team decided to discontinue veno-arterial Extracorporeal membrane oxygenation (VA-ECMO) and other life-support measures. The decision was communicated to Tamil Nadu Chief Secretary P. Rama Mohana Rao, Acting Chief Minister O. Panneerselvam, Lok Sabha Deputy Speaker M. Thambidurai, Health Minister C. Vijayabaskar, Health Secretary J. Radhakrishnan, and V. K. Sasikala to facilitate the smooth power succession. According to the treatment summary, Jayalalithaa had significant multiple underlying, pre-existing medical conditions, including obesity, hypertension, poorly controlled hypothyroidism, irritable bowel syndrome with chronic diarrhoea, and chronic seasonal bronchitis. She also experienced persistent sleep disturbances despite optimized sedative therapy. Richard Beale assessed her overall mortality risk at approximately 40% during the course of treatment.

== Death and national mourning ==
=== Death and announcement ===
Death certificate issued for J Jayalalithaa

On 6 December 2016 at around 0:15 IST, the hospital officially announced that she had died at 23:30 (5 December 2016), ending her reign and she became the first female chief minister to die in office in India.

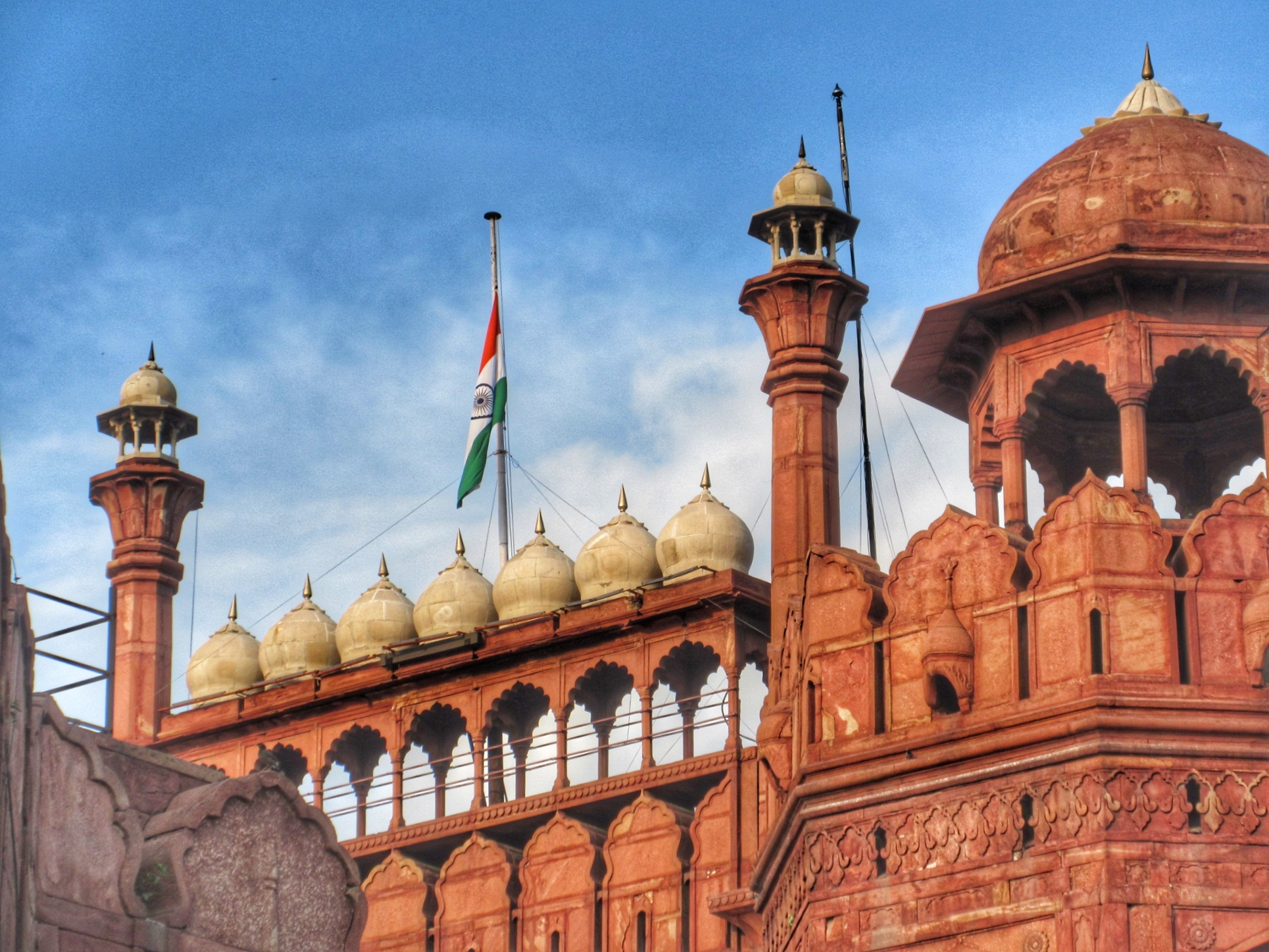
Government of India announced that the national flag would fly half-mast for one day in the capitals of all Indian states and union territories, including Delhi, as a mark of respect on her demise

Government of India declared a one-day national mourning with the national flag in all government buildings flying at half-mast. While a seven-day state mourning from 6 to 12 December 2016 was observed by Government of Tamil Nadu, also three-day state mourning from 6 to 8 December 2016 were observed by Government of Kerala and the Government of Puducherry. One day state mourning on 6 December 2016 was observed by Government of Karnataka,Government of Bihar,Government of West Bengal,Government of Punjab,Government of Uttarakhand and Government of Goa.

=== Lying-in-state ===
Her body was kept in state at her residence Veda Nilayam in Poes Garden until the wee hours of 6 December 2016 and later at Rajaji Hall for public to pay their tribute.

== State funeral ==
On the evening of 6 December 2016, the glass casket carrying her mortal remains was taken in an army truck adourned with flowers from Rajaji Hall to M.G.R. Memorial for a 3 km (1.9 mi) long grand public procession. Around one million people paid a visit to the funeral. Jayalalithaa's body was draped in her green coloured silk saree though with a red border and adorned with a diamond-studded gold dollar chain, diamond earrings, a Seiko wristwatch on her left wrist, one diamond ring on each hand, and a golden bangle on her right hand, and kept inside a sandalwood coffin engraved with the words "Puratchi Thalaivi Selvi J Jayalalithaa" (Eternal Leader Miss J Jayalalithaa). Her long-time aide V. K. Sasikala carried out the last rites, sprinkling rose petals, milk and holy water. Jayalalithaa was buried into the ground at the northern end of Marina Beach in Chennai, near the grave of her mentor and the former chief minister of Tamil Nadu M. G. Ramachandran at the M.G.R. and Jayalalithaa memorial complex.

== Reactions ==
=== India ===
India:

- President Pranab Mukherjee condoled and paid his tributes to her, stating, "One of India’s most charismatic & popular leaders, Ms. Jayalalithaa was a visionary & able administrator".
- Vice President Hamid Ansari said: "Jayalalithaa's demise is an irreparable loss to the people of India".

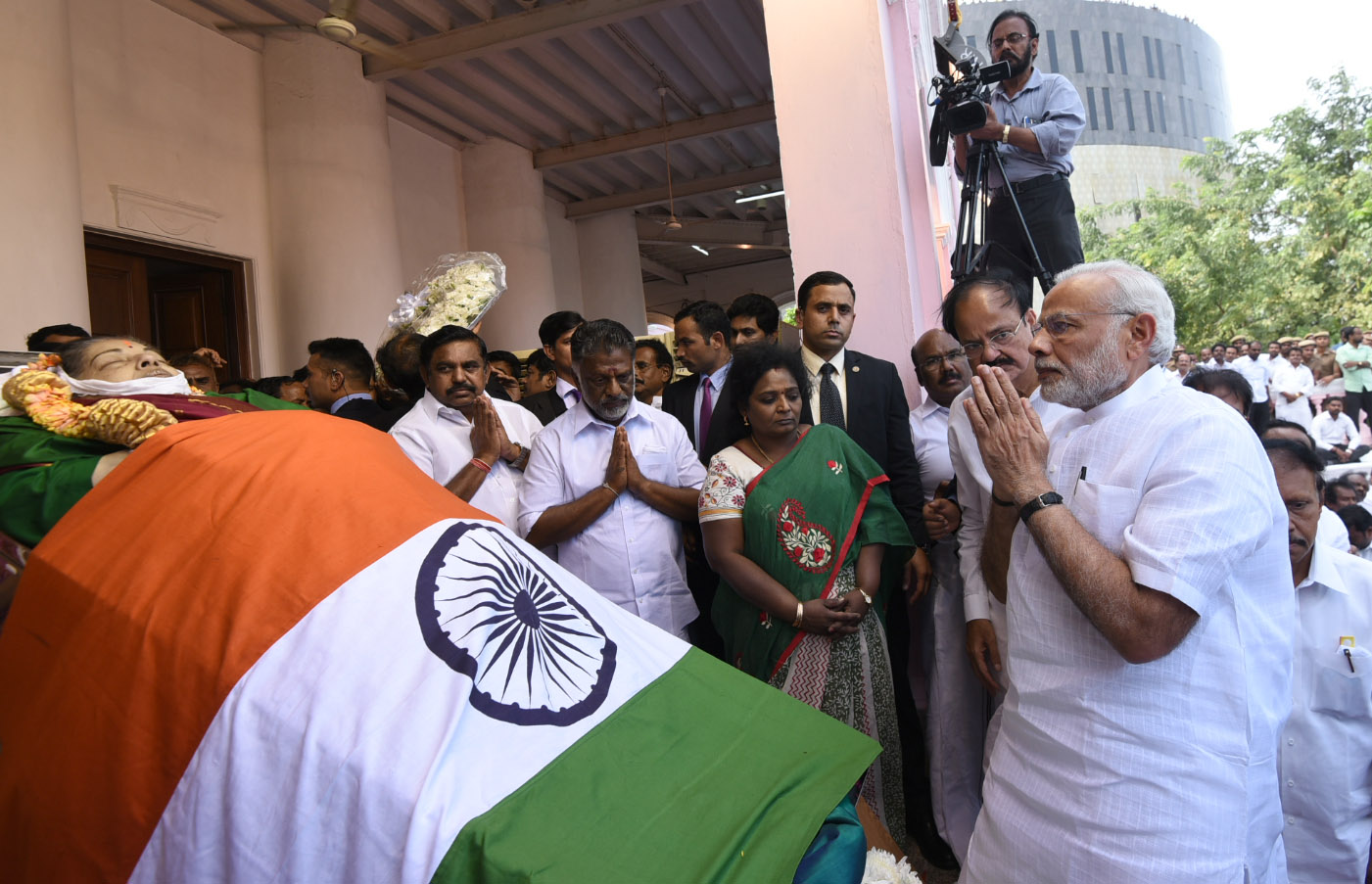
Prime Minister Narendra Modi paid tributes to the mortal remains of J. Jayalalithaa

- Prime Minister Narendra Modi expressed his condolence and tweeted that "Jayalalithaa ji's connect with citizens, concern for welfare of the poor, the women & marginalized will always be a source of inspiration".
  - Union Finance Minister Arun Jaitley said: "Saddened by the untimely passing away of J Jayalalithaa ji, an exceptional leader and Chief Minister of Tamil Nadu".
  - Union Home Minister Rajnath Singh said: "Selvi Jayalalithaa was one of the most iconic political figures of India who had an enormous impact on the people of Tamil Nadu".
  - Union External Affairs Minister Sushma Swaraj said: "It is tragic. It is painful. She was a woman of dignity and self-respect. We shared a warm personal relationship".
  - Union Commerce Minister Nirmala Sitharaman commented: "Sad to hear that Hon. CM of TN Selvi.Jayalalitha is no more. Her life's journey is a story of grit & perseverance. Understood the mind of the poor & the women. Stayed connected to her people. Remember fondly the affection she showed each time we met. Condolences".
  - Former Prime Minister Manmohan Singh said: "I join millions of admirers of Jayalalithaji in mourning her sad and untimely demise. She was a charismatic leader who will be remembered forever as the beloved Amma by the people of Tamil Nadu. She was an outstanding leader who was passionately devoted to the welfare of the people of Tamil Nadu."
  - Former Union Minister P. Chidambaram said: "Jayalalithaa was most dominant political personality of Tamilnadu in last 25 years. Jayalalithaa acquired large loyal following that equalled that of her mentor MGR. She brought a hard uncompromising style to politics and governance that won praise and criticism".
  - Lok sabha speaker Sumitra Mahajan said: "J Jayalalithaa ji was not only strong but also a good administrator. It is a big setback for politics. Not just Tamil Nadu but entire nation mourns the demise of Jayalalithaa ji. She was a very good administrator".
  - BJP president Amit Shah said: "Saddened by the demise of Tamil Nadu CM J.Jayalalithaa ji. I extend my deepest condolences to her party and followers in this hour of grief."
  - Congress President Sonia Gandhi said: "We pay our respects to J. Jayalalithaa ji. May her soul Rest In Peace".
  - Congress Vice President Rahul Gandhi said: "I would like to offer my condolences to the people of Tamil Nadu. Jayalalithaa ji was a great leader. She was not only a great leader of Tamil Nadu, she was a leader of this country. I, on behalf of the Congress and party president Sonia Gandhi and every single Congress worker in this country, pay our respects to a great lady, to a great leader of Tamil Nadu".

=== Indian States ===
- Andhra Pradesh Chief Minister Chandrababu Naidu said: "My deepest condolences to her well-wishers & supporters. She will remain in our memories as leader who truly cared for people".
- Arunachal Pradesh Chief Minister Pema Khandu said: "I express my grief of losing one of the most charismatic, influential and dedicated leaders ever produced by the country. Lovingly called Amma, who worked for the poor and the downtrodden she left behind a political legacy to cherish. I believe, leaving this mortal world will not diminish the love and affection showered on her by the people and her soul will remain immortal."
- Assam Chief Minister Sarbananda Sonowal said: "Deeply saddened by the demise of Tamil Nadu CM Jayalalithaa ji. India has lost one of its tallest leaders. May her soul rest in eternal peace."
- Bihar Chief Minister Nitish Kumar said: "It is unfortunate. It is a loss not only for Tamil Nadu politics but also for rest of the country. All of Bihar is in mourning today."
- Chhattisgarh Chief Minister Raman Singh said: "Work she did for people is remarkable, was a very popular leader as we can see the whole state is in mourning."
- Delhi - Chief Minister Arvind Kejriwal said: "Very sad to hear the demise of Amma. A very very popular leader. Aam admi's leader. May her soul rest in peace."

- Former Chief Minister Sheila Dikshit said: "I have always had fond regards for Jayalalithaa ji and I still cherish the memories of our friendship."

- Goa Chief Minister Laxmikant Parsekar said: "I am saddened by the demise of Jayalalithaa ji. It was a shock for all of us. She had been a great, popular leader. I pay homage on behalf of the state of Goa. May her soul rest in peace."
- Gujarat Chief Minister Vijay Rupani said: "Deeply saddened by the demise of Tamil Nadu CM Jayalalithaa ji. My thoughts and prayers are with the people of Tamil Nadu in this hour of grief."
- Haryana Chief Minister Manohar Lal Khattar said: "Deeply grieved to hear of the unfortunate demise of Tamil Nadu Chief Minister Jayalalithaa ji. My heartfelt condolences. My heartfelt tributes to Jayalalithaa ji - an iconic political figure, who was continually dedicated to the service of the people."
- Himachal Pradesh Chief Minister Virbhadra Singh said: "Deeply saddened by the untimely demise of Tamil Nadu CM Jayalalithaa. She has left a huge void in Dravidian politics. May her soul rest in peace."
- Jammu and Kashmir Chief Minister Mehbooba Mufti stated Jayalalithaa as "a leader of masses" and praised her women-specific initiatives. She said, "Jayalalithaa was an example personified of women empowerment who brought a unique style to country's politics."
- Jharkhand Chief Minister Raghubar Das said: "With her charismatic leadership, she took Tamil Nadu on the path of development. Her relation with the people was strong. The country lost a leader whose replacement was not possible."
- Karnataka Chief Minister Siddaramaiah said: "J Jayalalithaa's demise is a huge loss. I am going to Chennai to attend her last rites ceremony."
- Kerala

- Governor P. Sathasivam said: "She was the greatest woman political leader in contemporary India." - Chief Minister Pinarayi Vijayan said: "Jayalalithaa was as an extraordinary politician with a rare political acumen and administrative skills, which made her a distinct leader in Indian politics." A three-day state mourning from 6 to 8 December 2016 was observed by Government of Kerala.

- Madhya Pradesh Chief Minister Shivraj Singh Chouhan said: "Tamil Nadu Chief Minister Jayalalithaa's passing away is a great loss to the state and its people, we stand by them in this hour of grief."
- Maharashtra Chief Minister Devendra Fadnavis said: "She was one of the most respected leaders in the Tamil Nadu politics who earned the affectionate title of 'Amma' on account of her deep concern for the people."
- Manipur Governor Najma Heptulla said: "She was one of those politicians who had seen ups and downs in politics but she never bent down; she always held her head high and she was always clear in what she wanted to do."
- Meghalaya Chief Minister Mukul Sangma said: "I am deeply saddened at the demise of honourable Jayalalithaa ji. Her death leaves a deep void in not only her state but also in the nation as well. The departed leader will always be remembered for the numerous poverty alleviation initiatives pioneered by her to provide better and more meaningful life to the people especially the less fortunate."
- Mizoram Chief Minister Lal Thanhawla informed the Mizoram Assembly on 6 December 2016 about the death of Jayalalithaa, though an official obituary reference was not made as the funeral was yet to be performed. A formal obituary reference was later made on 15 March 2017.
- Nagaland Chief Minister T. R. Zeliang also condoled her death.
- Odisha Chief Minister Naveen Patnaik said: "I am deeply shocked at the passing away of Tamil Nadu Chief Minister Selvi J Jayalalithaa. She was a leader of the masses and had made immense contribution to the development and welfare of the people of Tamil Nadu."
- Puducherry

- Lieutenant Governor Kiran Bedi said: "Ms. Jayalalithaa was a rare political personality who charted a distinct path of governance through her strong and able leadership." - Chief Minister V. Narayanasamy said: "Jayalalithaa has done a lot of good work for the development of Tamil Nadu and for the welfare of the people. I mourn her death personally and also on behalf of the people of the union territory." Government of Puducherry observed a three-day state mourning from 6 to 8 December 2016.

- Punjab Chief Minister Parkash Singh Badal expressed profound grief and sorrow over the demise of Jayalalithaa.
- Rajasthan Chief Minister Vasundhara Raje said: "My heartfelt condolences and thoughts are with the bereaved family and followers. She shall be eternally cherished for her service to the people."
- Tamil Nadu

- Governor C. Vidyasagar Rao said: "Deeply shocked and sad. People's Chief Minister of Tamil Nadu". - Former Chief Minister M. Karunanidhi said: "I offer deep condolences on the passing away of Jayalalithaa. Wishes of lakhs of her followers will make her immortal." - Leader of Opposition M. K. Stalin said: "Deeply saddened by the demise of our CM Selvi Jayalalithaa. My deepest condolences to the party cadres & well wishers in this hour of grief. She was an iconic & courageous leader."

- Telangana Chief Minister K. Chandrashekar Rao said: "I offer my deep condolences on the demise of Tamil Nadu CM 'Puratchi Thalaivi' Kumari Jayalalithaa. Her political journey was a courageous one. Her demise is a deep loss to the Tamil society."
- Tripura Chief Minister Manik Sarkar said in a condolence message that it was an untimely and premature demise: "I convey my condolences to the people of Tamil Nadu at this hour of shock and sorrow."
- Uttar Pradesh Chief Minister Akhilesh Yadav said: "The country as a whole will miss the charismatic leadership of J Jayalalithaa. Her schemes for the poor will continue to inspire governance."
- Uttarakhand Chief Minister Harish Rawat visited Tamil Nadu House in Delhi to condole her death by garlanding her picture.
- West Bengal Chief Minister Mamata Banerjee said: "Popular, strong, bold, efficient, people-friendly, charismatic leader, Amma. Always at the heart of people. Big loss. I am shocked, saddened."

=== International ===
The US and several other countries sent condolences.

- United States:
  - American Ambassador Richard Verma offered his message of condolence in a statement: "On behalf of the United States, I extend my deepest condolences to the family of Chief Minister J. Jayalalithaa and the people of Tamil Nadu following her passing yesterday. Chief Minister Jayalalithaa will be remembered for her years of public service to Tamil Nadu and as a supporter of closer ties between the United States and India. Our thoughts and prayers are with the people of Tamil Nadu during this time of sorrow".
- China:
  - Chinese Ambassador Luo Zhaohui sent the letter of condolence to the Government of Tamil Nadu: "I was shocked to hear the unfortunate demise of Smt. Jayalalithaa Jayaraman, former Chief Minister of Tamil Nadu. I'd like to hereby express my deepest condolences to the Government and people of Tamil Nadu. Smt. Jayalalithaa is a prominent political leader in India I pay sincere respect to. Her irreplaceable contributions to the development of Tamil Nadu will be long remembered by history and people. I'm firmly believing that people of Tamil Nadu who just lost a great leader will soon summon up under the new leadership of Tamil Nadu. Tamil Nadu and China share a tradition of friendly relations, harmonious atmosphere between two peoples and frequent commercial exchanges."
- France:
  - French Ambassador Alexandre Ziegler condoled her death and stating that "On behalf of France, I express my heartfelt condolences on the demise of Chief Minister J. Jayalalithaa. Chief Minister Jayalalithaa was a prominent leader who was loved and admired by millions. My thoughts and sympathy go out to her near and dear ones and the grief-stricken people of Tamil Nadu and India".
- Germany:
  - Consulate General of Germany Achim Fabig sent a message of condolence on her demise.
- Canada:
  - Canadian High Commissioner to India Nadir Patel issued a statement of condolence: "On behalf of the High Commission of Canada, I am deeply saddened by Chief Minister Jayalalithaa's passing and I extend my sincere condolences to her family, and to the people of Tamil Nadu.Chief Minister Jayalalithaa and her valuable contributions to the people, development and progress of Tamil Nadu will not be forgotten".
- Nepal:
  - Nepal President Bidya Devi Bhandari and Prime Minister Pushpa Kamal Dahal sent separate messages of condolence to Indian President Pranab Mukherjee and Prime Minister Narendra Modi on the death of The Chief Minister of Tamil Nadu Jayalalithaa and through them to the bereaved family members.
- Bangladesh:
  - Bangladesh Foreign Minister Abul Hassan Mahmood Ali signed the condolence book at Dhaka on the demise of Jayalalithaa, by stating that "We express our deep condolences on the sad demise of the Chief Minister of Tamil Nadu, Selvi J Jayalalithaa. Our thoughts and prayers are with the people of Tamil Nadu at this hour of grief".
- Sri Lanka:
  - Sri Lankan President Maithripala Sirisena expressed his condolences and stating that "I am saddened by the news of the demise of the Chief Minister of Tamil Nadu J Jayalalithaa. She was totally dedicated to the welfare of the people and was dearly loved by her people. India loses a female politician and a truly pro-poor leader, whom people fondly called Amma".
  - Sri Lankan Prime Minister Ranil Wickremesinghe stated in a letter to Raj Bhavan: "Jayalalithaa was a visionary leader of our times. Sri Lanka mourns the loss of a stateswoman who upheld the welfare of her people and was much loved by them. Jayalalithaa leaves behind a legacy that speaks of political acumen and leadership skills. The people and the Government of Sri Lanka join me in offering our deepest sympathies".
  - Former Sri Lankan president Mahinda Rajapaksa offered his condolences, stating "she captured the hearts of India's Tamil community".
- Singapore:
  - Foreign Affairs Minister Vivian Balakrishnan wrote a letter of condolence to Chief Minister of Tamil Nadu O. Panneerselvam, saying:"The late Chief Minister Jayalalithaa dedicated her life to the socio-economic development of Tamil Nadu and through her leadership, Tamil Nadu grew to become one of India's key economies and industrialised states. She was also a strong proponent of building closer relations between Tamil Nadu and Singapore. Her passion, energy and grand vision were so inspiring. India has lost a great daughter and Singapore a staunch friend. It was therefore with deep sadness that I had attended her funeral to pay my last respects. Her Excellency Jayalalithaa left an indelible mark in Tamil Nadu and will be missed".
- Malaysia:
  - Malaysian Prime Minister Najib Razak also conveyed his condolences and stating that "My condolences to the people of India on the passing of the late J. Jayalalithaa, Chief Minister of Tamil Nadu".
  - President of Malaysia's Senate Vigneswaran Sanasee offered his condolences and stating that "I am very sad. All (of us) knew Jayalalithaa. She was also a famous actress. Hope the people (of Tamil Nadu) will be calm."
  - Malaysian Indian Congress Party condoled her death and described her as a "Charismatic leader who had done a lot for the Indian people, especially concerning for welfare of the poor, the women and the marginalised community".
- Turkey:
  - Turkish Ambassador Burak Akçapar condoled her demise and stated that "Sri Jayalalithaa-ji was among the first Indian leaders I had the honour to meet five years ago. I remember our conversation very positively. I am grateful to her supportive words for strong relations between Turkey and India. On this sad occasion, I extend our sincere condolences to the people of India and the state of Tamil Nadu."
- Turkmenistan:
  - Turkmenistan Deputy Foreign Minister Berdyniyaz Matiyev and Several Ambassadors signed the condolence book on the demise of Jayalalithaa.
- South Africa: South African Tamil Federation (SATF) has called on all its affiliates across the country to host special prayer services for the late Tamil Nadu Chief Minister, describing her as "a friend of the Tamil community worldwide".

=== Others ===
- Actor Rajinikanth said: "The brave leader's loss is not just for Tamil Nadu, but for whole of India. My prayers for our respectful CM's soul to rest in peace."
- Amitabh Bachchan, Shah Rukh Khan, Sachin Tendulkar, Rishi Kapoor, B. Saroja Devi, Vijay, Ajith Kumar, AR Rahman, Mohanlal, Mammooty, Mahesh Babu, Nagarjuna, Parthiban, Suriya Sivakumar and Other Film fraternity Condoled and paid last tributes on her demise.
- "I was two years elder than Ammu. As a little girl, she looked like a doll. I had acted with her mother and knew her grandmother. We worked together in 26 films. She was always focused on set and could speak on any subject, reflecting how well-read she was. Along with her, Kanchana, Rajasri, Jamuna and I made up quite a gang of friends. No one but Ammu could have followed in the footsteps of MGR, and lead his party in a stellar way all these years" – Actress Kumari Sachu, who acted 26 films with Jayalalithaa.
- "She was this most gorgeous, articulate chief minister of one of the greatest states of India, Tamil Nadu. She conducted herself with so much dignity. She spoke impeccable English and Tamil. I used to tell her she had all the Ashtalakshmis with her, specially the virtues of fairness and courage. At the 2013 Indian Cinema Centenary celebrations, she reminded me that I had not received a state award, adding that I belonged to the nation and would receive an honour from the President of India instead. Though we had political differences and our film careers rarely overlapped, our friendship and mutual respect remained unchanged"– Veteran Actress and Dancer Vyjayanthimala.
- "I knew Jayalalithaa since she was six, when her mother Sandhya often left her at my home. She was a brilliant student, a doll-like child, and later my co-star in Oli Vilakku. She rose through her own efforts to become a dynamic leader. She once hosted us for lunch, gifted us saris, and treasured every letter I wrote praising her work. Though we had occasional differences in films, I always admired her. In power or out, she remained a queen, and her compassion for the poor is why the common people mourn her." — Veteran Actress Sowcar Janaki, co-star acted with Jayalalithaa in Oli Vilakku and Neethi
- "We acted together in three or four films. She was a voracious reader and often brought books, including those on politics, to film sets. She also suggested changes to my costumes on Malayalam film sets in Chennai. She was my neighbour and visited me in the hospital at midnight after the birth of my son, bringing a basket of silver utensils as a gift. Although we lost touch after she entered politics, we later met at several public events."– Actress Sheela.
- "I worked with Jayalalithaa only in Sri Krishna Vijayam. When she invited us to the artistes' get-together at her home in 2012, it happened to be my birthday. She was not just a glamorous star but a talented performer. I admired her courage, intellect, and dynamism in politics. Even after I left Chennai decades ago, she remembered to invite me. She dedicated her life to the poor, and it was a life well lived."– Actress Jamuna.
- "I wanted to see her at the hospital, but no one was allowed inside. We first worked together in a play before acting in films, and she often visited me and invited me to her home. I am still in shock. She was a dignified, self-respecting, well-read, and intelligent woman whose few words always carried meaning. Her death is a great loss to the nation."–Actress K. R. Vijaya, co-star.
- "I acted with Jayalalithaa in Premalu Pellillu and admired her graceful walk and dignity. She was courageous, gifted, and had an exceptional memory for lengthy dialogues. We read about Rani Lakshmibai, but our generation saw that courage in Jayalalithaa. People across political parties admired her as a truly dynamic personality."– Actress Sarada, co-star.
- "I spent about a month-and-a-half with Jayalalithaa during the shoot of Izzat. She was friendly, courteous, and an avid reader. She would often cook for us, and even then, her eloquence hinted at her future as a politician"–Actor Dharmendra, lead in Jayalalithaa's only hindi film Izzat.
- "She would always report to sets on time as she was a stickler for punctuality. Like sivaji, She would hear the dialogues once and instantly say that she is ready for the take, even if the dialogues went for a few pages." – Actor Sivakumar, co-star
- "My parents were close to her mother Sandhya. My father was the chief guest at Amma's arangetram, where he called her a 'thanga silai' and encouraged her to act.She cared so much about Tamil Nadu. I would say people have lost a wonderful mother. We lost her too soon."– Actor Prabhu, son of former co-star Sivaji Ganesan.
- "Amma often read books between shots. During the filming of Anbai Thedi, after Sivaji Ganesan advised that actors should stay attentive to the filming, she accepted his advice with humility, apologized, and stopped reading on the set thereafter. During the making of Suryagandhi, she suggested that Kannadasan, who penned the song ' Paramasivan Kazhuthilirundhu ', should appear in it. She also proposed inviting Periyar E. V. Ramasamy to preside over the film's 100th-day celebration, and he later delivered a 30 minute memorable speech after hearing the film's story."– Director Muktha Srinivasan, directed her in four films - Bommalattam, Anbai Thedi, Suryagandhi and Cinema Paithiyam (in which she played a guest role).
- "We began our careers together with Vennira Aadai and later became close friends. She was sophisticated, well-behaved, and never indulged in gossip, preferring to discuss dance, fitness, and books. During the filming of Aayirathil Oruvan, her determination in independently taking a boat along with a female assistant of her age, to the shooting ship location impressed MGR, who praised her courage. Though politics later placed us on opposite sides in 1989, she understood my circumstances, never spoke ill of me, and remained courteous after I rejoined AIADMK in 2014. Her death was a great loss to the state."– Actress Vennira Aadai Nirmala, co-star from Jayalalithaa's debutant tamil film.
- "I knew her from when she was 10 years old. She was a quiet, dignified, and studious girl who later secured second rank in the state in the matriculation examinations. I even borrowed her notes for my own exams. Her mother was like family to us, and my father, Y. G. Parthasarathy, regarded her as his eldest daughter and he also called her a Japanese doll. Despite being a leading actress, she welcomed guests at my engagement in 1975. She remained close to my family, attending major family events, honouring my mother and me with awards, and visiting our home on her 60th birthday to seek my mother's blessings. To me, she was the sister I never had." – Actor Y. Gee. Mahendra, family friend.
- "She was the most articulate, dignified, cultured and caring lady I’ve ever met. I feel lucky to have worked with her. I, along with millions of people from the fraternity, will miss her."– Actress Sridevi Kapoor, who co-starred as a child artiste with Jayalalithaa in films - Nam Naadu, Aathi Parasakthi, Thirumangalyam and Unnai Suttrum Ulagam.
- "We made our sabha debut together in 1964 in Undersecretary. Having already acted as a child artiste and in the English play Teahouse of the August Moon, she was admired for her exceptional fluency in English, prompting Cho to remark, ' Everyone acted well, but only Jayalalithaa spoke English. ' She did not get friendly with everybody. She would gauge a person and only if she found them to be of her wavelength did she make them her friends. Our drama troupe used to sit around and chat before the start of the play, but the moment someone started gossiping, she would quietly leave and not participate in such discussions."– Actor A. R. Srinivasan (ARS), co-star during her theatre days.
- "She was seven years my senior in Church park school. Renowned for her beauty and academic excellence, she consistently won sports day medals in subjects like Science and Mathematics. we would all hang out of our class to see her walk past our classroom. Though admired by everyone, she was reserved and had only a few close friends. I vividly remember her 1970 performance at the Music Academy. Despite already being a well-known actress, she stayed in touch with her school teachers and regularly invited them to her programmes" – Dancer Anita Ratnam
- "Though I never met Jayalalithaa at Church Park as she was my senior, she was an inspiration to every student there, admired for her academic excellence and sporting achievements. My aunt, K. J. Sarasa, taught her Bharatanatyam, and we would cling to the classroom windows to catch a glimpse of her during dance lessons. I later worked on Paattum Bharathamum, though we did not share any scenes"– Actress Sripriya.
- "Amma’s death is an inconsolable loss, not only for politics but also to millions of women including me for whom she was an inspiration and a role model. When I came back to Chennai from Kerala, I felt like the city had lost something and there's a big void. It will take a long time for all of us to get over this". – Actress Trisha.

== Coverage ==
The news of Jayalalithaa's demise was covered by international media outlets such as the BBC, The Washington Post, The New York Times, The Guardian, The Telegraph, The Wall Street Journal and many more.

== Succession and aftermath ==
On 6 December 2016, O. Panneerselvam was elected as the AIADMK legislative party leader and chief minister of Tamil Nadu following the death of incumbent Chief Minister Jayalalithaa. At 01:15 IST, Panneerselvam along with 31 other cabinet ministers, was administered the oath of office and secrecy by Tamil Nadu Governor C. Vidyasagar Rao at a solemn ceremony in the Raj Bhavan. On 11 December 2016, the AIADMK stated that more than 470 party cadres had died, allegedly from 'shock' following Jayalalithaa's demise. The figure was later revised to 597, and the party announced a solatium of ₹3 lakh for each of their families. On 31 December 2016, the AIADMK general council appointed Jayalalithaa's aide V. K. Sasikala as the acting general secretary of the AIADMK until a formal election was held for the post.
