= M. K. Mohan =

Indian politician

M.K. Mohan

Member of the Tamil Nadu Legislative Assembly
- In office 19 May 2016 – 4 May 2026
- Preceded by: S. Gokula Indira
- Constituency: Anna Nagar
- Majority: 27,445

Personal details
- Party: Dravida Munnetra Kazhagam
- Spouse: Geetha Mohan
- Children: Karthik mohan
- Parent: Mannar Kothandapani (father)
- Occupation: Politician

| Birth = 13 May 1954 Mannar Kothandapani Mohan is the former Member of Legislative Assembly for the Anna Nagar Constituency, Chennai. He is a member of the Dravida Munnetra Kazhagam (DMK) political party of Tamil Nadu. He was the industrialist and former Councillor for Anna Nagar as well as a board member of Chennai Metro Water and trustee of the Pachaiyappa Trust.

== Electoral performance ==
Election	Constituency	Political party	Result	Vote %	Opposition			Ref
Election	Constituency	Political party	Result	Vote %	Candidate	Political party	Vote %	Ref
2016	Anna Nagar	DMK	Won	41.59%	S. Gokula Indira	AIADMK	40.95%	
2021	Anna Nagar	DMK	Won	48.95%	S. Gokula Indira	AIADMK	32.17%	-
