= Koovanur, Kallakurichi =

Village in Tamil Nadu, India

Koovanur
- village
- Location in Tamil Nadu, India Koovanur (India)
- Coordinates: 11°58′27″N 79°06′04″E
- Country: India
- State: Tamil Nadu
- District: Kallakurichi

Population (2011)
  - Total: 3,068

Languages
  - Official: Tamil
- Time zone: UTC+5:30 (IST)
- PIN: 605754
- Vehicle registration: TN 32
- Nearest city: Tiruvannamalai
- Lok Sabha constituency: Kallakurichi
- Vidhan Sabha constituency: Rishivandiyam

Koovanur is a village in Tirukkoyilur Taluk in Kallakurichi district in the state of Tamil Nadu, India. It is about 41.7 km from the town of Kallakurichi.

Koovanur has a total population of 3,068 people per Population Census 2011. Tamilnadu Minister E. V. Velu is from Koovanur.

The Koovanur assembly constituency is part of Rishivandiyam state assembly constituency and Kallakurichi Lok Sabha constituency. Agastheeswarar Temple is an ancient temple situated in Koovanur.
