= S. Raghavanandam =

Indian politician

Minister for Labour, Tamil Nadu
- In office 9 June 1980 – 15 November 1984
- Chief Minister: M. G. Ramachandran
- Preceded by: himself
- Succeeded by: K. A. Krishnaswamy
- In office 30 June 1977 – 17 February 1980
- Chief Minister: M. G. Ramachandran
- Preceded by: K. Rajaram
- Succeeded by: himself

Member of Tamil Nadu Legislative Council
- In office 2 August 1977 – 1 November 1986
- In office 1 March 1968 – 19 August 1971

4th General Secretary of the All India Anna Dravida Munnetra Kazhagam
- In office 14 March 1985 – 16 October 1986
- Preceded by: P. U. Shanmugam
- Succeeded by: M. G. Ramachandran

Personal details
- Party: Dravida Munnetra Kazhagam (1990 - 1999) (before 1972)
- Other political affiliations: All India Anna Dravida Munnetra Kazhagam (1972 - 1990)

S. Raghavanandam (1917–1999) was an Indian politician and former General Secretary of AIADMK. He was the Labour Minister in M. G. Ramachandran's Cabinet in 1977 and 1980. He was elected as the member of Tamil Nadu Legislative Council thrice in 1968, 1977 and 1988 representing both DMK and AIADMK.

== Political career ==
Raghavanandam served as the member of the Legislative Council representing DMK from 1968 to 1971. In 1972, when the DMK expelled MGR, joined the AIADMK. A letter was given to the chairman of the Board stating that he had resigned from the M.L.C. post. But Ragavanandam denied that he had written the resignation letter.

Raghavanandam was one of the senior leaders next to MGR in AIADMK. M.G.R, who was the general secretary of the AIADMK in the early days, became the chief minister and Raghavanandam became labour minister on his cabinet in 1977 and again in 1980. He was elected to Tamil Nadu Legislative Council representing AIADMK in 1977 and 1983. After P. U. Shanmugam, He served as the general secretary of AIADMK from 1985 to 1986. After the party split in 1988, He also held the post of Deputy General Secretary of AIADMK Janaki faction. In February 1989 after AIADMK United under Jayalalithaa, He continued as the Deputy General Secretary of the party. He joined back DMK in 1990.
