= Anna Nagar Assembly constituency =

State Legislative Assembly Constituency in Tamil Nadu

Coordinates: 13.0846°N 80.2179°E

Anna Nagar
- Constituency No. 21 for the Tamil Nadu Legislative Assembly

Constituency details
- Country: India
- Region: South India
- State: Tamil Nadu
- District: Chennai
- Lok Sabha constituency: Chennai Central
- Established: 1977
- Total electors: 188,861

Member of Legislative Assembly
- 17th Tamil Nadu Legislative Assembly
- Incumbent V. K. Ramkumar
- Party: TVK
- Elected year: 2026

Anna Nagar is a state assembly constituency in the Indian state of Tamil Nadu. Its State Assembly Constituency number is 21. It includes the locality of Anna Nagar, which is in Chennai. It is part of Chennai Central Lok Sabha constituency. Anna Nagar was one of 17 assembly constituencies to have VVPAT facility with EVMs in the 2016 Tamil Nadu Legislative Assembly election. It is one of the 234 State Legislative Assembly Constituencies in Tamil Nadu. Former chief minister Karunanidhi represented two times.

== Overview ==
As per orders of the Delimitation Commission, No. 21 Anna Nagar Assembly constituency is composed of Ward 100-103 & 105-107 of Greater Chennai Corporation.

== Members of the Legislative Assembly ==
Election	Member	Party
1977	M. Karunanidhi	Dravida Munnetra Kazhagam
1980	M. Karunanidhi	Dravida Munnetra Kazhagam
1984	S. M. Ramachandran	Dravida Munnetra Kazhagam
1989	K. Anbazhagan	Dravida Munnetra Kazhagam
1991	A. Chellakumar	Indian National Congress
1996	Arcot N. Veeraswami	Dravida Munnetra Kazhagam
2001	Arcot N. Veeraswami	Dravida Munnetra Kazhagam
2006	Arcot N. Veeraswami	Dravida Munnetra Kazhagam
2011	S. Gokula Indira	All India Anna Dravida Munnetra Kazhagam
2016	M. K. Mohan	Dravida Munnetra Kazhagam
2021	M. K. Mohan	Dravida Munnetra Kazhagam
2026	V. K. Ramkumar	Tamilaga Vettri Kazhagam

== Election results ==
Vote share of winning candidates
2026	43.7%
2021	48.95%
2016	41.59%
2011	58.67%
2006	46.20%
2001	48.20%
1996	67.05%
1991	57.29%
1989	49.94%
1984	52.59%
1980	48.97%
1977	50.10%

=== Assembly election 2026 ===
2026 Tamil Nadu Legislative Assembly election : Anna Nagar
Party	Candidate	Votes	%	±%
TVK	V. K. Ramkumar	71,375	43.70%	New
DMK	N. Chitrarasu	50,012	30.62%	▼18.33
AIADMK	S. Gokula Indira	34,382	21.05%	New
NTK	S. Shankar	4,839	2.96%	▼3.40
NOTA	None of the above	963	0.59%	▼0.35
Margin of victory		21,363	13.08%	▼3.70
Turnout		163,432	86.51%	▲28.55
Total valid votes		163,339		
Registered electors		188,908		▼33.97
TVK gain from DMK		Swing	▼5.25	

=== Assembly election 2021 ===
2021 Tamil Nadu Legislative Assembly election : Anna Nagar
Party	Candidate	Votes	%	±%
DMK	M. K. Mohan	80,054	48.95%	▲7.36
AIADMK	S. Gokula Indira	52,609	32.17%	▼8.78
MNM	V. Ponraj	17,522	10.71%	New
NTK	S. Shankar	10,406	6.36%	▲4.67
NOTA	None of the above	1,545	0.94%	▼1.39
AMMK	K. N. Gunasekaran	1,169	0.71%	New
Margin of victory		27,445	16.78%	▲16.14
Turnout		165,822	57.96%	▼2.08
Total valid votes		163,551		
Rejected ballots		726	0.44%	▲0.35
Registered electors		286,090		▲0.79
DMK hold		Swing		

=== Assembly election 2016 ===
2016 Tamil Nadu Legislative Assembly election : Anna Nagar
Party	Candidate	Votes	%	±%
DMK	M. K. Mohan	70,812	41.59%	New
AIADMK	S. Gokula Indira	69,726	40.95%	▼17.72
BJP	K. Suresh	8,832	5.19%	▲2.70
MDMK	Mallika Dayalan	6,384	3.75%	New
PMK	A. M. Akhilesh	5,402	3.17%	New
NOTA	None of the above	3,970	2.33%	New
NTK	N. Amutha	2,885	1.69%	New
Margin of victory		1,086	0.64%	▼23.49
Turnout		170,429	60.04%	▼6.82
Total valid votes		170,281		
Rejected ballots		148	0.09%	▲0.05
Registered electors		283,857		▲25.14
DMK gain from AIADMK		Swing	▼17.08	

=== Assembly election 2011 ===
2011 Tamil Nadu Legislative Assembly election : Anna Nagar
Party	Candidate	Votes	%	±%
AIADMK	S. Gokula Indira	88,954	58.67%	New
INC	V. K. Arivazhagan	52,364	34.54%	New
BJP	P. K. Haribabu	3,769	2.49%	▼1.15
Margin of victory		36,590	24.13%	▲18.41
Turnout		151,671	66.86%	▲5.29
Total valid votes		151,608		
Rejected ballots		63	0.04%	▲0.04
Registered electors		226,836		▼35.71
AIADMK gain from DMK		Swing	▲12.47	

=== Assembly election 2006 ===
2006 Tamil Nadu Legislative Assembly election : Anna Nagar
Party	Candidate	Votes	%	±%
DMK	Arcot N. Veeraswami	100,099	46.20%	▼2.00
MDMK	Vijaya Thayanban	87,709	40.48%	▲36.30
LKPT	K. Rajamany	11,665	5.38%	New
BJP	H. V. Hande	7,897	3.64%	New
DMDK	K. Senthamarai Kannan	6,594	3.04%	New
Margin of victory		12,390	5.72%	▲2.24
Turnout		217,235	61.57%	▲18.98
Total valid votes		216,659		
Registered electors		352,829		▼6.35
DMK hold		Swing		

=== Assembly election 2001 ===
2001 Tamil Nadu Legislative Assembly election : Anna Nagar
Party	Candidate	Votes	%	±%
DMK	Arcot N. Veeraswami	77,353	48.20%	▼18.85
PMK	C. Arumugam	71,775	44.73%	▲43.07
MDMK	C. Appandurai	6,708	4.18%	New
Margin of victory		5,578	3.48%	▼41.09
Turnout		160,469	42.59%	▼12.03
Total valid votes		160,469		
Registered electors		376,745		▲30.26
DMK hold		Swing		

=== Assembly election 1996 ===
1996 Tamil Nadu Legislative Assembly election : Anna Nagar
Party	Candidate	Votes	%	±%
DMK	Arcot N. Veeraswami	103,819	67.05%	▲30.47
INC	R. Balasubramanian	34,802	22.48%	▼34.81
CPI(M)	K. Varadarajan	7,203	4.65%	New
BJP	V. Elumalai	3,625	2.34%	▼0.72
PMK	V. J. Pandian	2,576	1.66%	▼0.24
Margin of victory		69,017	44.57%	▲23.86
Turnout		157,985	54.62%	▲3.72
Total valid votes		154,842		
Rejected ballots		3,170	2.01%	▲0.72
Registered electors		289,232		▲10.25
DMK gain from INC		Swing	▲9.76	

=== Assembly election 1991 ===
1991 Tamil Nadu Legislative Assembly election : Anna Nagar
Party	Candidate	Votes	%	±%
INC	A. Chellakumar	75,512	57.29%	▲41.14
DMK	S. M. Ramachandran	48,214	36.58%	▼13.36
BJP	S. P. Ramakrishnan Alias Ramki	4,031	3.06%	New
PMK	G. Selvam Alias Tamil Selvam	2,498	1.90%	New
Margin of victory		27,298	20.71%	▼1.96
Turnout		133,530	50.90%	▼13.66
Total valid votes		131,814		
Rejected ballots		1,716	1.29%	▲0.26
Registered electors		262,348		▲17.24
INC gain from DMK		Swing	▲7.35	

=== Assembly election 1989 ===
1989 Tamil Nadu Legislative Assembly election : Anna Nagar
Party	Candidate	Votes	%	±%
DMK	K. Anbazhagan	71,401	49.94%	▼2.65
AIADMK	V. Sukumar Babu	38,994	27.28%	New
INC	G. Lakshmanan	23,083	16.15%	New
AIADMK	V. Kothadaraman	7,089	4.96%	New
Margin of victory		32,407	22.67%	▲16.31
Turnout		144,459	64.56%	▲1.77
Total valid votes		142,965		
Rejected ballots		1,494	1.03%	▼0.76
Registered electors		223,765		▲13.65
DMK hold		Swing		

=== Assembly election 1984 ===
1984 Tamil Nadu Legislative Assembly election : Anna Nagar
Party	Candidate	Votes	%	±%
DMK	S. M. Ramachandran	63,854	52.59%	▲3.62
AIADMK	V. Kothadaraman	56,128	46.22%	▼2.09
Margin of victory		7,726	6.36%	▲5.69
Turnout		123,640	62.79%	▲0.54
Total valid votes		121,427		
Rejected ballots		2,213	1.79%	▲0.92
Registered electors		196,896		▲16.01
DMK hold		Swing		

=== Assembly election 1980 ===
1980 Tamil Nadu Legislative Assembly election : Anna Nagar
Party	Candidate	Votes	%	±%
DMK	M. Karunanidhi	51,290	48.97%	▼1.13
AIADMK	H. V. Hande	50,591	48.31%	New
JP	R. Jebamani	2,335	2.23%	▼9.89
Margin of victory		699	0.67%	▼18.45
Turnout		105,653	62.25%	▲13.61
Total valid votes		104,731		
Rejected ballots		922	0.87%	▲0.01
Registered electors		169,720		▼4.79
DMK hold		Swing		

=== Assembly election 1977 ===
1977 Tamil Nadu Legislative Assembly election : Anna Nagar
Party	Candidate	Votes	%	±%
DMK	M. Karunanidhi	43,076	50.10%	New
AIADMK	G. Krishnamurthy	26,638	30.98%	New
JP	T. Andiappan	10,419	12.12%	New
INC	R. Jayachandran	5,258	6.12%	New
Margin of victory		16,438	19.12%	
Turnout		86,717	48.64%	
Total valid votes		85,974		
Rejected ballots		743	0.86%	
Registered electors		178,266		
DMK win (new seat)				

== See also ==
- C. N. Annadurai
