= Manalurpet =

- Town
- Location in Tamil Nadu, India Manalurpet (India)
- Coordinates: 12°00′24″N 79°05′28″E
- Country: India
- State: Tamil Nadu
- District: Kallakurichi
- Taluk: Vanapuram

Area
  - Total: 2.86 km^{2} (1.10 sq mi)

Population (2011)
  - Total: 8,523
  - Density: 2,980/km^{2} (7,720/sq mi)

Languages
  - Official: Tamil
- Time zone: UTC+5:30 (IST)

Manalurpet is a town panchayat in the Vanapuram taluk of Kallakurichi district, in the Indian state of Tamil Nadu.

== Geography ==
Manalurpet is within Vanapuram taluk, which is in the northeastern part of Kallakurichi district. The town covers 2.86 square kilometres (1.10 sq mi) of land in the northern part of the taluk. It is located 15 kilometres (9.3 mi) northwest of Tirukoilur, the taluk headquarters, 43 kilometres (27 mi) northeast of Kallakurichi, the district headquarters, and 225 kilometres (140 mi) southwest of the state capital of Chennai. The town is located just north of the Ponnaiyar River, and is along State Highway 9A.

== Demographics ==
In 2011 Manalurpet had a population of 8,523 people living in 1,944 households. 4,256 (49.9%) of the inhabitants were male, while 4,267 (50.1%) were female. 989 children in the town, about 11.9% of the population, were at or below the age of 6. 70.0% of the population was literate, with the male-only literacy rate of 73.3% higher than the female rate of 58.6%. Scheduled Castes and Scheduled Tribes accounted for 11.4% and 0% of the population, respectively.
