= V. K. Ramkumar =

Indian politician

Member of the Tamil Nadu Legislative Assembly
- Incumbent
- Assumed office 2026
- Constituency: Anna Nagar
- Majority: 21,363

Personal details
- Born: 1981 (age 44–45) Anna Nagar, Chennai district, Tamil Nadu, India
- Party: Tamilaga Vettri Kazhagam
- Education: University of Melbourne
- Occupation: Politician, businessman

V. Krishnamoorthy Ramkumar (born 1981) is an Indian politician from Tamil Nadu. He is a Member of the Legislative Assembly from the Anna Nagar Assembly constituency in Chennai district representing the Tamilaga Vettri Kazhagam (TVK).

== Early life and education ==
Ramkumar is from Anna Nagar, Chennai district, Tamil Nadu. He is the son of Krishnamoorthy. He completed his Masters in Electronics at University of Melbourne, Australia in 2004. He is into business tourism and declared assets worth Rs.28 crore in his affidavit to the Election Commission of India.

== Career ==
Ramkumar won the Anna Nagar Assembly constituency representing the Tamilaga Vettri Kazhagam in the 2026 Tamil Nadu Legislative Assembly election. He polled 71,375 votes and defeated his nearest rival, N. Chitrarasu of the Dravida Munnetra Kazhagam (DMK), by a margin of 21,363 votes.

== Electoral performance ==
Election	Constituency	Political party	Result	Vote %	Opposition			Ref
Election	Constituency	Political party	Result	Vote %	Candidate	Political party	Vote %	Ref
2026	Anna Nagar	TVK	Won	43.70%	N. Chitrarasu	DMK	30.62%	-
