= D. Venugopal =

Indian politician (1931–2024)

D Venugopal

Member of Parliament
- In office 1996–2014
- Constituency: Tiruppattur, Tiruvannamalai

Member of Tamil Nadu Legislative Assembly
- In office 1977–1980
- Constituency: Thandarambattu

Member of Tamil Nadu Legislative Assembly
- In office 1980–1984
- Constituency: Thandarambattu

Personal details
- Born: 5 November 1931 Tiruvannamalai, Madras Presidency, British India
- Died: 15 February 2024 (aged 92)
- Party: DMK
- Spouse: Uthirambal
- Children: 3 daughters
- As of August, 2013

Danapal Venugopal (5 November 1931 – 15 February 2024) was an Indian politician who was a member of the 15th Lok Sabha from Tiruvannamalai Constituency. Previously, he represented the Tiruppattur constituency of Tamil Nadu and was a member of the Dravida Munnetra Kazhagam (DMK) political party.

== Life and career ==
Venugopal got elected to Lok Sabha 5 times and 2 times to Tamil Nadu state assembly.

Venugopal died on 15 February 2024, at the age of 92.
