= K. Manivarma =

Indian politician

K. Manivarma is an Indian politician and was a Member of the Legislative Assembly of Tamil Nadu. He was elected to the Tamil Nadu legislative assembly as a Tamil Maanila Congress (TMC) candidate from Thandarambattu constituency in the 1996 election.

In 2015, it was announced that Manivarma was taking the office of TMC district president.
