= Tiruvannamalai Assembly constituency =

State Legislative Assembly Constituency in Tamil Nadu

Coordinates: 12°14′27.38″N 79°01′40.99″E

Tiruvannamalai
- Constituency No. 63 for the Tamil Nadu Legislative Assembly

Constituency details
- Country: India
- Region: South India
- State: Tamil Nadu
- District: Tiruvannamalai
- Lok Sabha constituency: Tiruvannamalai
- Established: 1951
- Total electors: 2,50,026

Member of Legislative Assembly
- 17th Tamil Nadu Legislative Assembly
- Incumbent E. V. Velu
- Party: DMK
- Alliance: SPA
- Elected year: 2026

Tiruvannamalai is a state assembly constituency in Tiruvannamalai district of Tamil Nadu, India. Its State Assembly Constituency number is 63. It comprises portions of Chengam and Tiruvannamalai taluks and is a part of Tiruvannamalai Lok Sabha constituency for national elections to the Parliament of India. Most successful party: DMK (ten times). It is one of the 234 State Legislative Assembly Constituencies in Tamil Nadu, in India.

== Members of Legislative Assembly ==
Year	Member	Political party
Madras State
1952	Thangavelu	Indian National Congress
1952	Ramachandra Reddiar	Indian National Congress
1957	P. U. Shanmugam	Independent
1957	P. S. Santhanam	Independent
1962	P. Palani Pillai	Indian National Congress
1963	P. U. Shanmugam	Dravida Munnetra Kazhagam
1967	D Vijayaraj	Indian National Congress
Tamil Nadu
1971	P. U. Shanmugam	Dravida Munnetra Kazhagam
1977	P. U. Shanmugam	Dravida Munnetra Kazhagam
1980	K. Narayanasamy	Indian National Congress (I)
1984	A. S. Ravindran	Indian National Congress
1989	K. Pitchandi	Dravida Munnetra Kazhagam
1991	V. Kannan	Indian National Congress
1996	K. Pitchandi	Dravida Munnetra Kazhagam
2001	K. Pitchandi	Dravida Munnetra Kazhagam
2006	K. Pitchandi	Dravida Munnetra Kazhagam
2011	E. V. Velu	Dravida Munnetra Kazhagam
2016	E. V. Velu	Dravida Munnetra Kazhagam
2021	E. V. Velu	Dravida Munnetra Kazhagam
2026	E. V. Velu	Dravida Munnetra Kazhagam

== Election results ==
Vote share of winning candidates
2026	40.11%
2021	66.72%
2016	57.15%
2011	49.40%
2006	49.88%
2001	47.75%
1996	66.55%
1991	58.94%
1989	54.61%
1984	51.31%
1980	58.78%
1977	32.22%
1971	62.21%
1967	49.39%
1963 by-election	0.0%
1962	50.06%
1957	29.42%

=== 2026 ===
2026 Tamil Nadu Legislative Assembly election: Tiruvannamalai
Party	Candidate	Votes	%	±%
DMK	Velu. E.V	88,273	40.11	▼26.61
TVK	Arul Arumugam	85,818	39.00	New
BJP	Elumalai. C	34,280	15.58	▼5.33
NTK	Vignesh. S	6,011	2.73	▼4.04
NOTA	NOTA	785	0.36	▼0.70
RPI(A)	Benny Rajan. C.J	627	0.28	New
Independent	Salam. M	474	0.22	New
Independent	Elumalai. A S/o Arumugam	356	0.16	New
Independent	Arul. K	325	0.15	New
Independent	Kothandapani. B	284	0.13	New
BSP	Raj. S	281	0.13	New
Naadaalum Makkal Katchi	Vijayakumar. S	277	0.13	New
Veerath Thiyagi Viswanathadoss Thozhilalarkal Katchi	Kannan. P	256	0.12	New
Independent	Palani. N	219	0.10	New
Independent	Ananth. A.M	212	0.10	New
Independent	Adhithya Palanisamy. A	188	0.09	New
Independent	Arul Anand. V	169	0.08	New
Thamizhaka Padaippalar Makkal Katchi	Nakkiran. A	135	0.06	New
Independent	Elumalai. C S/o Chinnakuzhanthai	130	0.06	New
Independent	Ramesh. V	129	0.06	New
TVK	Malli. S	122	0.06	New
Independent	Vignesh. M	93	0.04	New
Independent	Raja. V	91	0.04	New
Independent	Elumalai. C S/o Chinnarasu	87	0.04	New
ACDP	Velu. V	81	0.04	New
Independent	Maheswari. R	77	0.03	New
Independent	Venkatesan. M	66	0.03	New
Independent	Marikkannu. E	61	0.03	New
Independent	Anbalagan. M	59	0.03	New
Independent	Velu. K	58	0.03	New
Independent	Moorthy. P	42	0.02	New
Margin of victory		2,455	1.11	▼44.70
Turnout		2,20,066	88.02	▲15.86
Registered electors		2,50,026		▼36,354
DMK hold		Swing	▼26.61	

=== 2021 ===
2021 Tamil Nadu Legislative Assembly election: Tiruvannamalai
Party	Candidate	Votes	%	±%
DMK	E. V. Velu	137,876	66.72	+9.57
BJP	S. Thanigaivel	43,203	20.91	+19.96
NTK	J. Kamalakkannan	13,995	6.77	+5.95
MNM	R. Arul	6,246	3.02	New
NOTA	NOTA	2,194	1.06	+0.18
AMMK	A. G. Panchatcharam	2,108	1.02	New
Margin of victory		94,673	45.81	21.11
Turnout		206,642	72.16	−7.71
Rejected ballots		130	0.06	
Registered electors		286,380		
DMK hold		Swing	9.57	

=== 2016 ===
2016 Tamil Nadu Legislative Assembly election: Tiruvannamalai
Party	Candidate	Votes	%	±%
DMK	E. V. Velu	116,484	57.15	+7.75
AIADMK	Perumal Nagar K. Rajan	66,136	32.45	−13.96
PMK	L. Pandian	7,916	3.88	New
DMDK	S. Manikandan	5,075	2.49	New
BJP	Venkatachalapathi	1,935	0.95	+0.06
NOTA	NOTA	1,803	0.88	New
NTK	J. Kamalakkannan	1,686	0.83	New
Margin of victory		50,348	24.70	21.72
Turnout		203,825	79.87	−0.95
Registered electors		255,195		
DMK hold		Swing	7.75	

=== 2011 ===
2011 Tamil Nadu Legislative Assembly election: Tiruvannamalai
Party	Candidate	Votes	%	±%
DMK	E. V. Velu	84,802	49.40	−0.49
AIADMK	S. Ramachandran	79,676	46.41	+5.07
BJP	A. Arjunan	1,519	0.88	−0.21
Independent	S. Sathasivaraja	1,186	0.69	New
BSP	S. Raji	955	0.56	New
Margin of victory		5,126	2.99	−5.56
Turnout		171,679	80.82	11.15
Registered electors		212,430		
DMK hold		Swing	-0.49	

=== 2006 ===
2006 Tamil Nadu Legislative Assembly election: Tiruvannamalai
Party	Candidate	Votes	%	±%
DMK	K. Pitchandi	74,773	49.88	+2.14
AIADMK	R. Pavan Kumar	61,970	41.34	New
DMDK	S. Kumaran	6,660	4.44	New
BJP	Narayana Gandhi @ G. Gandhi	1,635	1.09	New
SP	A. Kalingan	1,289	0.86	New
Independent	E. Pichandi	889	0.59	New
Margin of victory		12,803	8.54	5.50
Turnout		149,893	69.67	9.50
Registered electors		215,158		
DMK hold		Swing	2.14	

=== 2001 ===
2001 Tamil Nadu Legislative Assembly election: Tiruvannamalai
Party	Candidate	Votes	%	±%
DMK	K. Pitchandi	64,115	47.75	−18.8
PMK	M. Shunmugasundaram	60,025	44.70	+39.11
MDMK	J. Senthil Kumar	3,140	2.34	+0.57
Independent	K. Mohan	2,518	1.88	New
Independent	A. Alagesan	1,720	1.28	New
Independent	P. Arumugam	764	0.57	New
Independent	T. Pakkiri	695	0.52	New
Margin of victory		4,090	3.05	−39.06
Turnout		134,281	60.17	−9.34
Registered electors		223,433		
DMK hold		Swing	-18.80	

=== 1996 ===
1996 Tamil Nadu Legislative Assembly election: Tiruvannamalai
Party	Candidate	Votes	%	±%
DMK	K. Pitchandi	83,731	66.55	+33.04
INC	A. Arunachalam	30,753	24.44	−34.5
PMK	B. Sekar	7,040	5.60	New
MDMK	T. Elango	2,231	1.77	New
BJP	R. Pandurangan	671	0.53	New
Margin of victory		52,978	42.11	16.68
Turnout		125,822	69.50	1.25
Registered electors		188,514		
DMK gain from INC		Swing	7.61	

=== 1991 ===
1991 Tamil Nadu Legislative Assembly election: Tiruvannamalai
Party	Candidate	Votes	%	±%
INC	V. Kannan	67,034	58.94	+36.97
DMK	K. Pitchandi	38,115	33.51	−21.1
PMK	M. Shanmugasundaram	6,887	6.06	New
Margin of victory		28,919	25.43	−7.22
Turnout		113,737	68.26	−3.43
Registered electors		171,857		
INC gain from DMK		Swing	4.33	

=== 1989 ===
1989 Tamil Nadu Legislative Assembly election: Tiruvannamalai
Party	Candidate	Votes	%	±%
DMK	K. Pitchandi	57,556	54.61	+8.84
INC	A. S. Ravindran	23,154	21.97	−29.34
AIADMK	K. P. Kannan	18,061	17.14	New
Independent	G. Krishnamoorthy	4,431	4.20	New
Independent	T. C. Kannan	887	0.84	New
Independent	V. Ramasamy	592	0.56	New
Margin of victory		34,402	32.64	27.10
Turnout		105,394	71.68	−6.49
Registered electors		150,265		
DMK gain from INC		Swing	3.30	

=== 1984 ===
1984 Tamil Nadu Legislative Assembly election: Tiruvannamalai
Party	Candidate	Votes	%	±%
INC	A. S. Ravindran	49,782	51.31	−7.47
DMK	S. Murugaiyan	44,409	45.77	New
Independent	N. Ramanujam	2,385	2.46	New
Margin of victory		5,373	5.54	−14.31
Turnout		97,027	78.17	−0.02
Registered electors		129,693		
INC hold		Swing	-7.47	

=== 1980 ===
1980 Tamil Nadu Legislative Assembly election: Tiruvannamalai
Party	Candidate	Votes	%	±%
INC	K. Narayanasamy	54,437	58.78	+28.17
AIADMK	P. U. Shanmugam	36,052	38.93	+14.57
Independent	S. Narayanasamy	634	0.68	New
Independent	K. R. Venkatesan	520	0.56	New
Margin of victory		18,385	19.85	18.24
Turnout		92,609	78.19	5.25
Registered electors		120,155		
INC gain from DMK		Swing	26.56	

=== 1977 ===
1977 Tamil Nadu Legislative Assembly election: Tiruvannamalai
Party	Candidate	Votes	%	±%
DMK	P. U. Shanmugam	27,148	32.22	−29.99
INC	D. Pattuswamy	25,786	30.61	−7.18
AIADMK	K. R. Venkatesan	20,525	24.36	New
JP	P. Thandavarayan	8,689	10.31	New
Independent	A. R. Sugunapandian	2,100	2.49	New
Margin of victory		1,362	1.62	−22.81
Turnout		84,248	72.94	−4.42
Registered electors		117,397		
DMK hold		Swing	-29.99	

=== 1971 ===
1971 Tamil Nadu Legislative Assembly election: Tiruvannamalai
Party	Candidate	Votes	%	±%
DMK	P. U. Shanmugam	46,633	62.21	+16.95
INC	D. Annamalai Pillai	28,323	37.79	−11.6
Margin of victory		18,310	24.43	20.30
Turnout		74,956	77.36	−7.08
Registered electors		104,261		
DMK gain from INC		Swing	12.83	

=== 1967 ===
1967 Madras Legislative Assembly election: Tiruvannamalai
Party	Candidate	Votes	%	±%
INC	D. Vijayaraj	38,153	49.39	−0.68
DMK	P. U. Shanmugam	34,968	45.26	−2.31
Independent	M. Arumugam	4,134	5.35	New
Margin of victory		3,185	4.12	1.63
Turnout		77,255	84.43	10.86
Registered electors		94,545		
INC hold		Swing	-0.68	

=== 1963 by-election ===
P. U. Shanmugam won.

=== 1962 ===
1962 Madras Legislative Assembly election: Tiruvannamalai
Party	Candidate	Votes	%	±%
INC	P. Palani Pillai	35,148	50.06	+30.46
DMK	P. U. Shanmugam	33,399	47.57	New
SWA	P. Kanna Kandar	1,663	2.37	New
Margin of victory		1,749	2.49	−2.87
Turnout		70,210	73.57	−15.95
Registered electors		99,596		
INC gain from Independent		Swing	20.64	

=== 1957 ===
1957 Madras Legislative Assembly election: Tiruvannamalai
Party	Candidate	Votes	%	±%
Independent	P. U. Shanmugham	48,447	29.42	
Independent	C. Santhanam (SC)	39,622	24.06	
INC	V. K. Annamalai Kounder	32,273	19.60	
INC	A. Arumugam	29,328	17.81	
Independent	K. Arunachalam (SC)	8,555	5.20	
Independent	S. Chinnasamy (SC)	2,537	1.54	
Independent	N. Subbarayan (SC)	2,002	1.22	
Independent	M. Perumal Nainar	1,888	1.15	
Margin of victory		8,825	5.36	
Turnout		1,64,652	89.52	
Registered electors		1,83,923		
Independent win (new seat)				

=== 1952 ===
1952 Madras Legislative Assembly election: Thiruvannamalai
Party	Candidate	Votes	%	±%
INC	Ramachandra Reddiar	21,579	20.60	20.60
INC	Thangavelu	18,895	18.04	18.04
Commonweal Party	Vadivalu Gounder	18,283	17.45	
Independent	T. V. Devaraja Mudaliar	14,970	14.29	
Commonweal Party	Raghavan	9,620	9.18	
RPI	Santhanam	6,195	5.91	
Independent	Manickavelu Mudalier	5,304	5.06	
Akhil Bharat Hindu Maha Sabha	Rajagopal Naidu	3,009	2.87	
Independent	Vettaraya Gounder	3,008	2.87	
Independent	Ponnuswamy	2,262	2.16	
Independent	Ayyadurai Pillai	1,635	1.56	
Margin of victory		2,684	2.56	
Turnout		1,04,760	73.23	
Registered electors		1,43,057		
INC win (new seat)				
