= Thandarambattu Assembly constituency =

Former constituency in Tamil Nadu, India

Coordinates: 12.154°N 78.948°E

Thandarampattu
- Former constituency for the Tamil Nadu Legislative Assembly

Constituency details
- Country: India
- Region: South India
- State: Tamil Nadu
- District: Thiruvannamalai
- Lok Sabha constituency: Thirupattur
- Established: 1971
- Abolished: 2008
- Total electors: 187,339
- Reservation: None

Thandarambattu is a former state assembly constituency in Tiruvannamalai district in Tamil Nadu.

== Members of the Legislative Assembly ==
Year	Winner	Party
1971	M. S. Radhakrishnan	Dravida Munnetra Kazhagam
1977	D. Venugopal	Dravida Munnetra Kazhagam
1980	D. Venugopal	Dravida Munnetra Kazhagam
1984	E. V. Velu	All India Anna Dravida Munnetra Kazhagam
1989	D. Ponnumudi	Dravida Munnetra Kazhagam
1991	M. K. Sundaram	All India Anna Dravida Munnetra Kazhagam
1996	K. Manivarma	Tamil Maanila Congress
2001	E. V. Velu	Dravida Munnetra Kazhagam
2006	E. V. Velu	Dravida Munnetra Kazhagam

== Election results ==
Vote share of winning candidates
2006	56.67%
2001	48.86%
1996	62.96%
1991	64.26%
1989	45.62%
1984	58.96%
1980	63.86%
1977	38.01%
1971	58.82%

=== 2006 ===
2006 Tamil Nadu Legislative Assembly election: Thandarambattu
Party	Candidate	Votes	%	±%
DMK	E. V. Velu	81,592	56.67	7.82
AIADMK	S. Ramachandran	50,891	35.35	
DMDK	Mohammad M	4,582	3.18	
Independent	Murugesan A	1,333	0.93	
SP	Kuppan M	1,293	0.90	
BJP	Dharuman M R	1,069	0.74	
Independent	Rajendran A N	704	0.49	
Independent	Palani Mohan P	652	0.45	
BSP	Baskaran. M. R	527	0.37	
Independent	Mayavan N	492	0.34	
Independent	Mani M	267	0.19	
Margin of victory		30,701	21.32	17.61
Turnout		1,43,976	76.85	8.10
Registered electors		1,87,339		
DMK hold		Swing	7.82	

=== 2001 ===
2001 Tamil Nadu Legislative Assembly election: Thandarambattu
Party	Candidate	Votes	%	±%
DMK	E. V. Velu	63,599	48.86	
TMC(M)	K. Manivarma	58,762	45.14	
MDMK	Kulanthaivel. K.	2,487	1.91	−2.47
Independent	Velusamy. M.	1,475	1.13	
Independent	Anbazhagan. M.	1,398	1.07	
Independent	Ranganathan. A.	911	0.70	
Independent	Vadivel. G.	841	0.65	
Independent	Theerthagiri. P.	706	0.54	
Margin of victory		4,837	3.72	−30.79
Turnout		1,30,179	68.75	−3.95
Registered electors		1,89,344		
DMK gain from TMC(M)		Swing	-14.10	

=== 1996 ===
1996 Tamil Nadu Legislative Assembly election: Thandarambattu
Party	Candidate	Votes	%	±%
TMC(M)	K. Manivarma	72,636	62.96	
AIADMK	Kuppusamy. A. P.	32,822	28.45	−35.81
MDMK	Jhayabal. V.	5,051	4.38	
PMK	Masilamani. A.	3,013	2.61	
Independent	Murugesan. A.	1,266	1.10	
BSP	Govindaraj. C.	259	0.22	
SAP	Rajavel. P.	107	0.09	
Independent	Sadayan. A.	102	0.09	
Independent	Elumalai. P. K.	78	0.07	
Independent	Sanniyasi. C.	42	0.04	
Margin of victory		39,814	34.51	0.39
Turnout		1,15,376	72.70	0.55
Registered electors		1,67,532		
TMC(M) gain from AIADMK		Swing	-1.31	

=== 1991 ===
1991 Tamil Nadu Legislative Assembly election: Thandarambattu
Party	Candidate	Votes	%	±%
AIADMK	M. K. Sundaram	69,433	64.26	37.19
DMK	D. Ponnumudi	32,570	30.14	−15.47
PMK	Babu Kandar S.	5,212	4.82	
Independent	Devaraj P.	308	0.29	
Independent	Narayanasamy P.	274	0.25	
THMM	Mani A.	250	0.23	
Margin of victory		36,863	34.12	15.58
Turnout		1,08,047	72.15	−6.77
Registered electors		1,54,707		
AIADMK gain from DMK		Swing	18.64	

=== 1989 ===
1989 Tamil Nadu Legislative Assembly election: Thandarambattu
Party	Candidate	Votes	%	±%
DMK	D. Ponnumudi	48,048	45.62	7.38
AIADMK	E. V. Velu	28,519	27.08	−31.88
AIADMK	Sundaram. M.K.	13,052	12.39	−46.56
INC	Sahadevar. K.	12,481	11.85	
Independent	Devaraju. P.	1,451	1.38	
Independent	Jaganathan. S.	835	0.79	
Independent	Venkatakrishnan. N.P.	492	0.47	
Independent	Nadesan. K.M.	275	0.26	
Independent	Velu. S.	175	0.17	
Margin of victory		19,529	18.54	−2.18
Turnout		1,05,328	78.92	−1.06
Registered electors		1,36,462		
DMK gain from AIADMK		Swing	-13.34	

=== 1984 ===
1984 Tamil Nadu Legislative Assembly election: Thandarambattu
Party	Candidate	Votes	%	±%
AIADMK	E. V. Velu	53,422	58.96	
DMK	D. Venugopal	34,649	38.24	−25.62
Independent	K. Munusamykander	1,024	1.13	
Independent	M. Veerabathiran	835	0.92	
Independent	P. Ramachandran	443	0.49	
Independent	G. Dhanakotiudayar	240	0.26	
Margin of victory		18,773	20.72	−8.33
Turnout		90,613	79.98	13.50
Registered electors		1,20,070		
AIADMK gain from DMK		Swing	-4.91	

=== 1980 ===
1980 Tamil Nadu Legislative Assembly election: Thandarambattu
Party	Candidate	Votes	%	±%
DMK	D. Venugopal	46,326	63.86	25.86
GKC	U. Kasinathan	25,257	34.82	
Independent	K. Munusamy Kandar	593	0.82	
Independent	B. Ramu Reddiar	364	0.50	
Margin of victory		21,069	29.04	19.82
Turnout		72,540	66.48	−5.05
Registered electors		1,10,889		
DMK hold		Swing	25.86	

=== 1977 ===
1977 Tamil Nadu Legislative Assembly election: Thandarambattu
Party	Candidate	Votes	%	±%
DMK	D. Venugopal	28,605	38.01	−20.81
AIADMK	A. Ramalingam	21,661	28.78	
INC	M.A. Ponnusamv Reddy	18,933	25.16	−16.03
JP	K. Munusamy Kandar	6,064	8.06	
Margin of victory		6,944	9.23	−8.41
Turnout		75,263	71.53	−3.43
Registered electors		1,07,350		
DMK hold		Swing	-20.81	

=== 1971 ===
1971 Tamil Nadu Legislative Assembly election: Thandarambattu
Party	Candidate	Votes	%	±%
DMK	M. S. Radhakrishnan	37,991	58.82	
INC	Sahadeva Ginder K.	26,600	41.18	
Margin of victory		11,391	17.64	
Turnout		64,591	74.96	
Registered electors		90,062		
DMK win (new seat)				

=== 1967 ===
1967 Tamil Nadu Legislative Assembly election: Thandarambattu
Party	Candidate	Votes	%	±%
INC	K. Shahadeva Gandar	29,524	48.35	
DMK	R. Dharmalingam	28,185	46.16	
Margin of victory		1339	2.19	
Turnout		61,061	73.74	
Registered electors		82,797		
INC win (new seat)				
