= P. U. Shanmugam =

Indian politician

P U Shanmugam
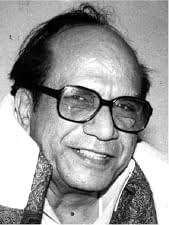

3rd General Secretary of the All India Anna Dravida Munnetra Kazhagam
- In office 11 June 1980 – 13 March 1985
- Preceded by: V. R. Nedunchezhiyan
- Succeeded by: S. Raghavanandam

Convenor of DMK High Level Working Committee
- In office 1989–2007
- Preceded by: position established
- Succeeded by: P. V. Kalyanasundaram; K. Ponmudy

Organizing Secretary of Dravida Munnetra Kazhagam
- In office 1972–1977
- Preceded by: N. V. Natarajan
- Succeeded by: Neela Narayanan

Minister for Health, Government of Tamil Nadu
- In office 22 October 1986 – 30 January 1988
- Chief Minister: M. G. Ramachandran; V. R. Nedunchezhiyan (interim); V. N. Janaki
- Preceded by: H. V. Hande
- Succeeded by: K. Ponmudy

Minister of Local Administration, Tamil Nadu
- In office 18 March 1985 – 21 October 1986
- Chief Minister: M. G. Ramachandran
- Preceded by: R. Soundararajan
- Succeeded by: K. A. Krishnaswamy

Minister of Public Works, Government of Tamil Nadu
- In office 1971–1976
- Chief Minister: M. Karunanidhi
- Preceded by: S. J. Sadiq Pasha
- Succeeded by: Panruti S. Ramachandran

Minister for Commercial Taxes, Tamil Nadu
- In office 1969–1973
- Chief Minister: M. Karunanidhi
- Preceded by: K. A. Mathiazhagan
- Succeeded by: S. J. Sadiq Pasha

Member of Tamil Nadu Legislative Assembly
- In office 1984–1988
- Political Party: AIADMK
- Preceded by: A. Chinnadurai
- Succeeded by: R. Panchatcharam
- Constituency: Melmalayanur
- In office 1971–1980
- Political Party: DMK
- Preceded by: D. Vijayaraj
- Succeeded by: K. Narayanasamy
- Constituency: Tiruvannamalai
- In office 1963–1967
- Political Party: DMK
- Preceded by: P. Palani Pillai
- Succeeded by: D. Vijayaraj
- Constituency: Tiruvannamalai
- In office 1957–1962
- Political Party: Independent
- Preceded by: Ramachandra Reddiar
- Succeeded by: P. Palani Pillai
- Constituency: Tiruvannamalai

Personal details
- Born: 15 August 1924 Tiruvannamalai, Madras Presidency, British India (
- Died: 11 April 2007 (aged 82) Chennai, Tamil Nadu, India
- Cause of death: Parkinson's disease
- Party: Dravida Munnetra Kazhagam
- Other political affiliations: All India Anna Dravida Munnetra Kazhagam (1977–1989); Makkal Dravida Munnetra Kazhagam (1977)

P. U. Shanmugam, affectionately called as Paa Vuu Saa (15 August 1924 - 11 April 2007) was an Indian politician and former minister of Tamil Nadu for Internal affairs, former minister of Public works, former minister of public health and various other portfolios on various tenures. The Dravidian veteran also worked as the Organisation Secretary of DMK and the 3rd General Secretary of AIADMK. He defeated the Indian National Congress candidate in Tiruvannamalai Assembly constituency by-election in 1963 on DMK ticket.

== Early life ==
P. U. Shanmugam was born in a Tuluva Vellala Mudaliar family of Tiruvannamalai in 1924. He was SSLC educated at Municipal High School in Tiruvannamalai.

== Legislative victories ==
He was elected to the Tamil Nadu legislative assembly from Tiruvannamalai constituency as an independent candidate in 1957 election, as a Dravida Munnetra Kazhagam candidate in 1971, and 1977 elections. He lost to Congress candidate in 1980 election from Tiruvannamalai constituency as an All India Anna Dravida Munnetra Kazhagam Candidate. He was elected to the Tamil Nadu legislative assembly respresenting All India Anna Dravida Munnetra Kazhagam in 1984 election. He also contested from Melmalayanur constituency and lost in 1989 election as a candidate of All India Anna Dravida Munnetra Kazhagam (AIADMK) Janaki faction. In 1989, He joined DMK and served as the Convenor of DMK Party High Level Working Committee till his death in 2007.
