= List of general secretaries of the All India Anna Dravida Munnetra Kazhagam =

General Secretary of the All India Anna Dravida Munnetra Kazhagam

General Secretary of the All India Anna Dravida Munnetra Kazhagam
- Aṉaittintiya Aṇṇā Tirāviṭa Muṉṉēṟṟak Kaḻaka Potuc Ceyalāḷar
- Flag of the AIADMK

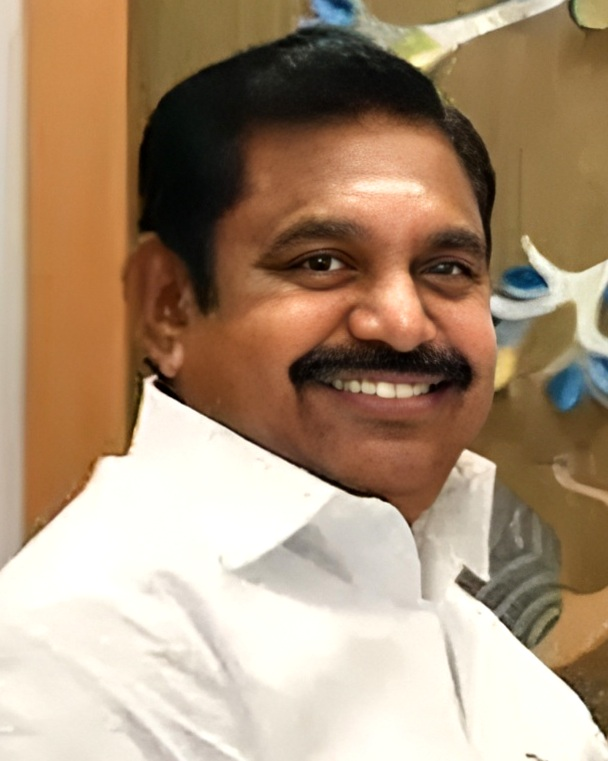
- Incumbent; Edappadi K. Palaniswami since 11 July 2022
- General Secretary's Office
- Type: Head of the All India Anna Dravida Munnetra Kazhagam
- Status: Leader of the Party
- Abbreviation: GSOAIADMK
- Member of: All India Anna Dravida Munnetra Kazhagam
- Residence: 4/32, Deiva Sigamani Street, Balaji Nagar, Royapettah, Chennai – 600014, Tamil Nadu, India
- Seat: Puratchi Thalaivar M.G.R. Maaligai, 226, V.P. Raman Salai, Royapettah, Chennai – 600014, Tamil Nadu, India.
- Appointer: Committee consisting of members of the All India Anna Dravida Munnetra Kazhagam from the General and Executive Councils
- Constituting instrument: Constitution of the All India Anna Dravida Munnetra Kazhagam
- Formation: 17 October 1972; 53 years ago
- First holder: M. G. Ramachandran
- Deputy: K. P. Munusamy
- Website: www.aiadmk.com

The General Secretary of the All India Anna Dravida Munnetra Kazhagam is the head of the All India Anna Dravida Munnetra Kazhagam (AIADMK), an Indian regional political party with great influence in the state of Tamil Nadu and the union territory of Puducherry. It is a Dravidian party founded by the former chief minister of Tamil Nadu M. G. Ramachandran (M.G.R.) at Madurai on 17 October 1972 as a breakaway faction from the Dravida Munnetra Kazhagam after M. Karunanidhi expelled him from the party for demanding an account as the party treasurer. The party is adhering to the policy of socialism and secularism based on the principles of C. N. Annadurai (Anna) collectively coined as Annaism by M.G.R. The party has won a seven-time majority in the Tamil Nadu Legislative Assembly and has emerged as the most successful political outfit in the state's history. Since 1976, the AIADMK general secretary has been the leader of the party.

According to the Constitution of the All India Anna Dravida Munnetra Kazhagam, the general secretary serves as an ex officio member of the Chief Executive Council and General Body Council, Party's de facto top decision-making body. The general secretary also sets the agenda of Chief Executive Council and General Body Council meetings. The General Secretary has been a symbol of stability and continuity in the party.

The incumbent general secretary is Edappadi K. Palaniswami, who took office on 28 March 2023, after serving as the interim general secretary from 11 July 2022. The last person who held the position was the Former Chief Minister of Tamil Nadu J. Jayalalithaa, who served as Party General Secretary from 1988 (Note: From 17 December 1988 to 8 February 1989, Election Commission of India froze AIADMK's name and symbol, so Jayalalithaa served general secretary of AIADMK(J) Faction that time.) until her death in 2016. In 21st August 1996, rebel leaders like Thirunavukkasar, S. Muthusamy, S. Raja Kannapan, Arangayam expelled her from party and removed her as general secretary and later appointed Thirunavukkasar as general secretary. It was later challenged and won by her.

== History ==
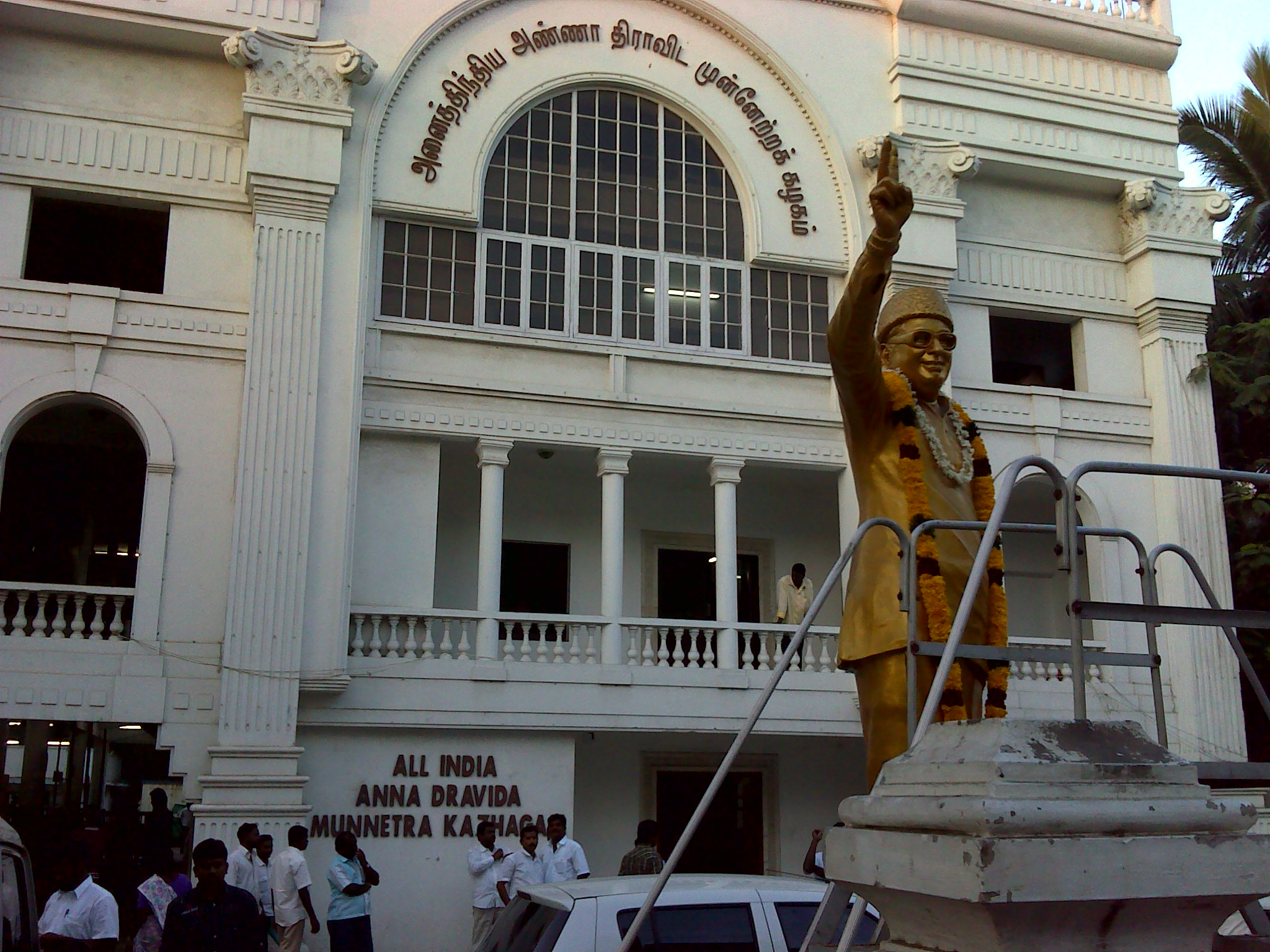
Puratchi Thalaivar M.G.R. Maaligai
Headquarters of the party

The party was founded on 17 October 1972, as Anna Dravida Munnetra Kazhagam (ADMK) by M. G. Ramachandran (M.G.R.), a veteran Tamil film star and popular politician. It was set up as a breakaway faction from the Dravida Munnetra Kazhagam after its president M. Karunanidhi expelled him from the party for demanding an account as the party treasurer. M.G.R., who wanted to start a new political party, then incorporated into Anakaputhur Ramalingam's party, which had registered under the name ADMK. He then quoted, "I joined the party started by an ordinary volunteer" and gave the post of Member of Legislative Council (MLC) to Ramalingam.

On 1 November 1976, M.G.R. prefixed the All India (AI) tag to the party's name to protect the party during the Maintenance of Internal Security Act (MISA) and The Party Constitution formally came into effect with the General Secretary position as its head. During the lifetime of M. G. Ramachandran, He was the face of the party until his death on 24 December 1987, though others such as V. R. Nedunchezhiyan, P. U. Shanmugam, S. Raghavanandam served as the general secretaries of the party in different times. On 1 January 1988, Jayalalithaa was elected general secretary of the AIADMK by the prominent members of her faction, and it was ratified by the party general council convened by her the next day. The party began to crumble due to infighting and broke into two factions, one under Jayalalithaa and the other under VN Janaki, wife of M.G.R. and another film actress-turned-politician who had starred with M.G.R. The Election Commission of India froze the "Two Leaves" symbol on 17 December 1988. Following the AIADMK's rout in the 1989 Tamil Nadu election, the factions led by Janaki and Jayalalithaa merged under Jayalalithaa's leadership on 7 February 1989, as Janaki decided to quit politics as it was not her forte. On 8 February 1989, then Chief Election Commissioner R. V. S. Peri Sastri granted the Two Leaves symbol to the united AIADMK led by Jayalalithaa. From then, The AIADMK was led by the former chief minister of Tamil Nadu J. Jayalalithaa (Amma) as general secretary of the party till her death in 5 December 2016. She was admired as the Mother of the party by her cadre and was highly popular among the Tamil populace until her death in 2016.

After her death, The Party General Council appointed Jayalalithaa's aide V. K. Sasikala as the acting general secretary of the party on 31 December 2016. On 12 September 2017, A dual leadership system was amended in the constitution of the party by removing the designation of general secretary and Late J. Jayalalithaa was named the eternal general secretary of AIADMK at the AIADMK general council. After constituting the new designations for the party's leadership, O. Panneerselvam and Edappadi K. Palaniswami became the coordinator and joint coordinator of the AIADMK respectively.

On 11 July 2022, The AIADMK general council reversed its previous decision and brought back the general secretary position to elect Edappadi K. Palaniswami as party head. i.e., Interim general secretary On 28 March 2023, Edappadi K. Palaniswami was elected as the general secretary of the party through a general secretary election. On 20 April 2023, the Election Commission of India recognized Edappadi K. Palaniswami as the general secretary of the party, acknowledging the amendments to the party constitution and changes to the list of office-bearers. On 10 July 2023, the Election Commission of India recognized the changes made in the party organization after the party's due election.

== The General Council ==
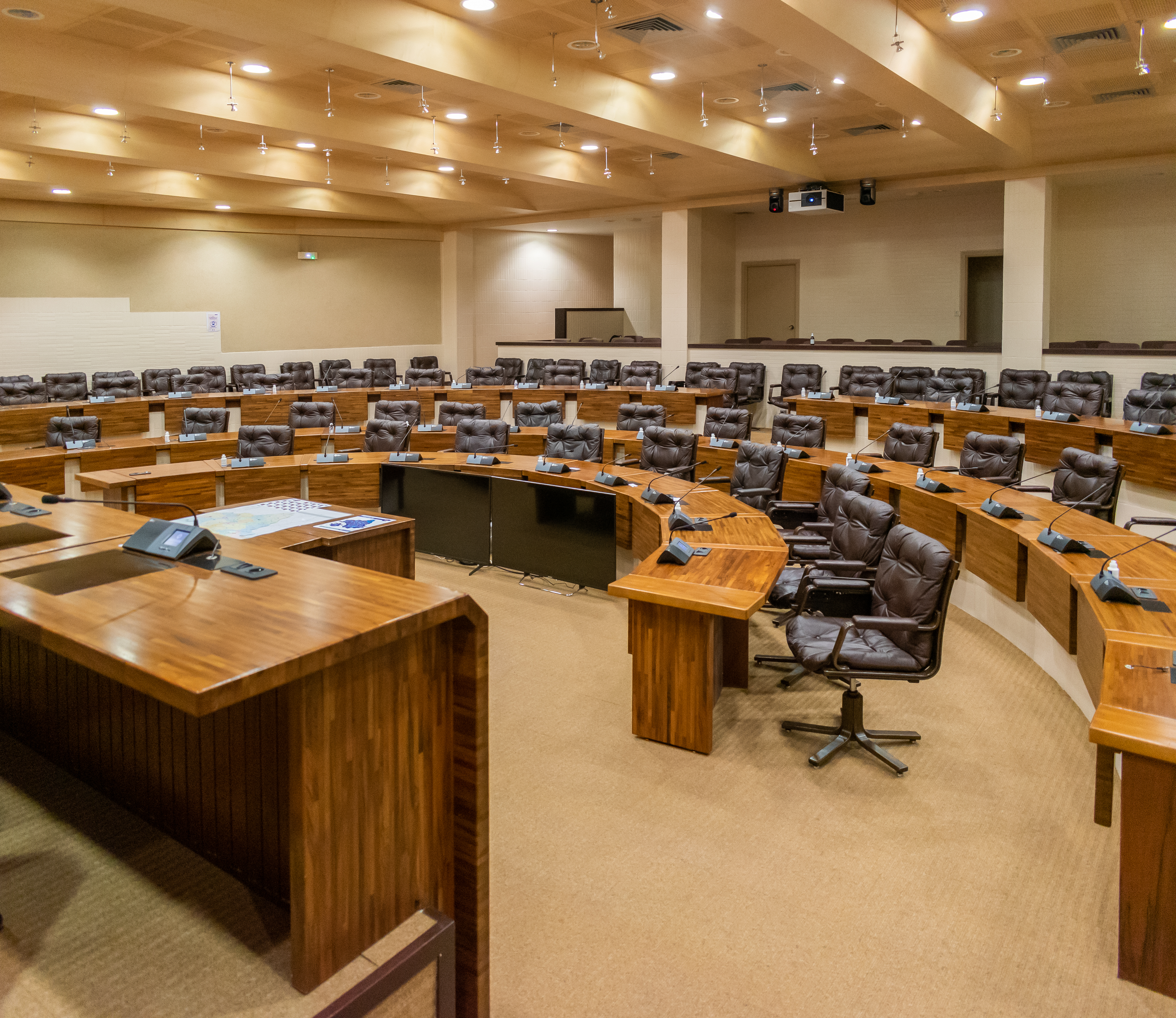
The General Council shall be the Supreme body of the party with all powers.

The General Council consists of Presidium Chairman, General Secretary, Deputy General Secretaries Treasurer, Headquarters Secretaries, the members of executive council and general council elected from all districts and other states, the members of Audit Committee, Property Protection Committee and Parliamentary Board. The General Council Meeting shall be convened once in a year and Central Executive Council twice in a year or whenever it is considered. The General council (GC) has 5-year term. The tenure shall get extended till the next GC meeting is convened.

The General Council will elect the Presidium Chairman to preside over the proceedings of the Central Executive Council and The General council meetings. In his absence, one of the GC member will temporarily preside over and conduct the meetings.

== Election ==
The General Secretary of the AIADMK is elected for a five-year term

The AIADMK general secretary shall be elected by the primary members of the party. In practice, the de facto method of selecting the general secretary has varied over time. V. K. Sasikala and Edappadi K. Palaniswami were first elevated to the position of interim general secretary by the general council. The interim general secretary would later succeed the retiring or deceased general secretary as part of a generational leadership transition at the subsequent general council meeting. Under this informal process, the interim general secretary would be chosen during deliberations by incumbent members of the general council in the lead-up to a formal election.

Eligibility

The members of the party who fulfill the following eligibility criteria prescribed in the rules and regulations shall be eligible to participate in the elections:

- The member who wishes to contest for the post of general secretary should be a member of the party for ten continuous years.
- The member who wishes to contest for the post of general secretary should have served as an office-bearer in the M.G.R. Puratchiyagam for five years.
- The name of the candidate who wishes to contest for the post of general secretary shall be proposed by at least 10 district secretaries of the party's organizational districts, and such a proposal should be seconded by at least 10 other district secretaries of the party's organizational districts. A district secretary can propose or second only one candidate.

== Powers and position ==
The powers and roles of the general secretary are defined, with 5-year term limits and written rules for selecting a successor. However, the general secretaries have been unanimously elected so far. The general secretary holds ultimate power and authority over the party and government while in power and is usually considered the supreme leader of the cadres. However, most of the people until Edappadi K. Palaniswami, who have held the post, have held far less power than M. G. Ramachandran and J. Jayalalithaa.

According to the constitution of the party,

- The general secretary shall be elected by the primary members of the party for a 5-year term.
- The general secretary alone is empowered to admit a person to the primary membership of the party.
- The general secretary is responsible for the entire administration of the party. The decisions of the General Secretary and General Council shall be final regarding crucial party matters.
- If any member resorts to any court proceedings against the decision of the General Council, he or she shall cease to be a primary member of the party.
- The general secretary will constitute the Central Executive Committee, consisting of the General Secretary, Presidium Chairman, Deputy General Secretaries, Treasurer, Puratchi Thalaivar M.G.R. Secretaries, District Secretaries, and the nominated members.
- The members of the Central Executive Committee, Treasurer, and Headquarters Secretaries nominated by the General Secretary will hold the office during the tenure of the General Secretary.
- If for any reason the general secretary is relieved of the post, removed from the post, is unable to perform his or her functions, or the post falls vacant before the expiry of the tenure, an Interim General Secretary elected by the general council shall function until the new general secretary is elected and assumes office.
- The power to immediately call for the general council is given to office-bearers who were nominated by the previous general secretary. Such a meeting shall be called for within 30 days.
- The State Council set up in Tamil Nadu and other states shall be fixed by the General Secretary according to the strength of the parties in the respective states.
- The General Council Meeting shall be convened once in a year and Central Executive Council twice in a year or whenever it is considered by the general secretary.
- The General Secretary shall have the powers and responsibilities to convene the Executive and the General Council Meeting, to implement policies and programmes of the Party as decided by the councils.
- The General Secretary is empowered to take all kinds of disciplinary actions in accordance with the party rules against the party units and its office bearers who violate the party rules, regulations or act against the party interests.
- The General Secretary is empowered to take decisions and actions on important political events, policies and programmes of urgent nature which cannot brook delay and wait the meeting of either executive or general council. Such actions or decisions have to be ratified by the general council on the next meeting.
- The General Secretary is vested with powers to deposit the party funds in any legally constituted banks or financial institutions either in current accounts or fixed deposits and to authorize the party treasurer to operate the bank accounts on his behalf to deposit or to withdraw funds or to obtain loans for the party purposes.
- The Authorization Forms addressed to the election Officers for the allotment of the Two Leaves Symbol to the AIADMK party candidates shall be signed only by The General Secretary of the party.
- If 1/5 of the total members of the general council request the general secretary to convene the special meeting of the general council, the General Secretary should do so within 30 days of the receipt of such a requisition.

== List of party general secretaries ==
No.	Portrait	Name (Birth–Death)	Term in office			Elected via	Electoral officer(s)
No.	Portrait	Name (Birth–Death)	Assumed office	Left office	Time in office	Elected via	Electoral officer(s)
1		M. G. Ramachandran (1917–1987)	17 October 1972	31 October 1976	6 years, 316 days	Resolution	General Council
1		M. G. Ramachandran (1917–1987)	1 November 1976	22 June 1978	6 years, 316 days	Election	N/A
1		M. G. Ramachandran (1917–1987)	17 October 1986	24 December 1987	6 years, 316 days	Election	V. R. Nedunchezhiyan
2		V. R. Nedunchezhiyan (1920–2000)	23 June 1978	10 June 1980	1 year, 353 days	Election	N/A
3		P. U. Shanmugam (1924–2007)	11 June 1980	13 March 1985	4 years, 275 days	Election	V. R. Nedunchezhiyan
4		S. Raghavanandam (1917–1999)	14 March 1985	16 October 1986	1 year, 216 days	Election	V. R. Nedunchezhiyan
5		J. Jayalalithaa (1948–2016)	1 January 1988 (Note: From 17 December 1988 to 9 February 1989, Election Commission of India froze AIADMK's name, so Jayalalithaa served general secretary of AIADMK(J) Faction that time.)	8 February 1989	28 years, 339 days	Resolution	General Council
5		J. Jayalalithaa (1948–2016)	9 February 1989	22 June 1993	28 years, 339 days	Election	V. R. Nedunchezhiyan
5		J. Jayalalithaa (1948–2016)	23 June 1993	22 September 1998	28 years, 339 days	Election	V. R. Nedunchezhiyan
5		J. Jayalalithaa (1948–2016)	23 September 1998	9 September 2003	28 years, 339 days	Election	V. R. Nedunchezhiyan
5		J. Jayalalithaa (1948–2016)	10 September 2003	9 September 2008	28 years, 339 days	Election	C. Ponnaiyan
5		J. Jayalalithaa (1948–2016)	10 September 2008	28 August 2014	28 years, 339 days	Election	Visalakshi Nedunchezhiyan
5		J. Jayalalithaa (1948–2016)	29 August 2014	5 December 2016	28 years, 339 days	Election	Visalakshi Nedunchezhiyan
Acting		V. K. Sasikala (b. 1954)	31 December 2016	17 February 2017	48 days	Resolution	General Council
Interim		Edappadi K. Palaniswami (b. 1954)	11 July 2022	27 March 2023	4 years, 77 days	Resolution	General Council
6		Edappadi K. Palaniswami (b. 1954)	28 March 2023	Incumbent	4 years, 77 days	Election	Natham R. Viswanathan and Pollachi V. Jayaraman

== Notes ==
- From 21 August 2017 to 23 June 2022, the party was led under the dual leadership of the former chief ministers of Tamil Nadu O. Panneerselvam and Edappadi K. Palaniswami as co-ordinator and joint co-ordinator respectively.
