= T. Vediyappan =

Indian politician (1959)

Member-Tamil Nadu Legislative Assembly
- In office 1991–1996
- Preceded by: A. Rajendran
- Succeeded by: A. Rajendran
- Constituency: Polur

Personal details
- Born: 6 June 1959 Panappampattu
- Party: All India Anna Dravida Munnetra Kazhagam
- Profession: Farmer

T. Vediyappan is an Indian politician and a former Member of the Legislative Assembly (MLA) of Tamil Nadu. He hails from Panappampattu village in the Tiruvannamalai district. Having completed his Pre-University Course (PUC), Vediyappan is a member of the All India Anna Dravida Munnetra Kazhagam (AIADMK) party. He contested and won the 1991 Tamil Nadu Legislative Assembly election from the Polur Assembly constituency to become a Member of the Legislative Assembly.

== Electoral Performance ==
=== 1991 ===
1991 Tamil Nadu Legislative Assembly election: Polur
Party	Candidate	Votes	%	±%
AIADMK	T. Vediyappan	60,262	62.13%	+35.83
DMK	A. Rajendran	21,637	22.31%	−16.49
PMK	K. G. Elumalai	13,026	13.43%	New
AAP	S. Santha	705	0.73%	New
Independent	M. Annamalai	505	0.52%	New
Margin of victory		38,625	39.82%	27.32%
Turnout		97,001	67.13%	4.37%
Registered electors		151,807		
AIADMK gain from DMK		Swing	23.33%	
