= R. Abishek =

Indian politician

Member of the Tamil Nadu Legislative Assembly
- Incumbent
- Assumed office 11 May 2026
- Preceded by: Agri S. S. Krishnamoorthy
- Constituency: Polur

Personal details
- Party: Tamilaga Vettri Kazhagam

R. Abishek is an Indian politician and member of Tamilaga Vettri Kazhagam (TVK). He is the elected Member of the Legislative Assembly (MLA) for the Polur Assembly constituency in Tiruvannamalai district, Tamil Nadu, in the 2026 Tamil Nadu Legislative Assembly election.
