= V. Panneerselvam =

Indian politician (born 1972)

சட்டமன்ற உறுப்பினர், தமிழ்நாடு சட்டமன்றம்
- In office 2016–2021
- Preceded by: Agri S. S. Krishnamurthy
- Succeeded by: P. S. T. Saravanan
- Constituency: Kalasapakkam Assembly constituency

Personal details
- Born: 17 May 1972 Bolur
- Party: All India Anna Dravida Munnetra Kazhagam
- Profession: Business

V. Panneerselvam is an Indian politician and a former Member of the Legislative Assembly (MLA) of Tamil Nadu. He belongs to the Polur area of Tiruvannamalai district. Panneerselvam, who has studied up to the 10th grade, is affiliated with the All India Anna Dravida Munnetra Kazhagam (AIADMK). He contested and won the election for the Kalasapakkam Assembly constituency in the 2016 Tamil Nadu Legislative Assembly election, thereby becoming a Member of the Legislative Assembly.

== Electoral performance ==
=== 2016 ===
2016 Tamil Nadu Legislative Assembly election: Kalasapakkam
Party	Candidate	Votes	%	±%
AIADMK	V. Panneerselvam	84,394	45.41%	−13.54
INC	G. Kumar	57,980	31.20%	−3.21
PMK	R. Kalidass	23,825	12.82%	New
DMDK	M. Nehru	9,932	5.34%	New
NOTA	NOTA	1,510	0.81%	New
Independent	P. Rajaprabu	1,387	0.75%	New
Independent	E. Rajkumar	1,047	0.56%	New
Margin of victory		26,414	14.21%	−10.33%
Turnout		185,859	84.75%	−1.61%
Registered electors		219,301		
AIADMK hold		Swing	-13.54%	
