= Mersal controversies =

2017 Indian film controversies

The 2017 Indian film Mersal was the subject of several controversies. The first of these was the issue of the title, where a lawsuit was filed against the producers for using the title for promotions. The release also faced complications following the Tamil Film Producers Council's strike following the double taxation issue; this was a protest against the 10% entertainment tax additionally over the 28% GST, with the last minute denial of a censor certificate from the censor board, after Animal Welfare Board of India denied NOC over the usage of few animals without their permission. Upon release, the film was criticised by several organisations including the Bharatiya Janata Party and the then ruling AIADMK government objected to scenes featuring Vijay criticising the recently introduced Goods and Services Tax, and another scene in which a character ridicules the Digital India initiative. The party demanded that those scenes must be removed from future viewership. The Indian Medical Association and several other medical associations called for a boycott on the film, following their criticism over the alleged cynical portrayal of doctors working in government-operated hospitals. Several opposition parties and the film fraternity of India condemned the actions instructed by political organisations as a critical attack on freedom of speech in India.

== Title naming ==
The Madras High Court issued an interim ban against the film producers Thenandal Studio Limited using the title Mersal. In a lawsuit filed by A. Rajendran of AR Film Factory, it stated that Rajendran had registered the title Mersalayitten at the Tamil Film Producers Council in 2014, and claimed the similarities over the film's title may affect the prospects of his film. Following the restrictions by court, the team decided to change the title as Aalaporaan Thamizhan but the producers decided to stick to the original title. On 6 October 2017, the high court dismissed the plea and the team decided to retain its title.

== Pre-release complications ==
=== Tamil Film Producers Council strike ===
On 27 September 2017, the Tamil Nadu government slapped 10% local body entertainment tax for Tamil films and 20% tax for non-Tamil films in addition to the 28% Goods and Services Tax levied by the Central government. This decision was criticised by Tamil film exhibitors and distributors, and in response to this issue, the Tamil Film Producers Council announced that the release of new films will be halted from 6 October, following the double taxation row. Many multiplex chains such as PVR and Inox, stopped screening of films in Chennai theatres starting from 3 October, protesting against the entertainment tax issue. The move led fans anxious, that whether the film may release on 18 October (Diwali) or may postpone to a later date, despite the producers continued to promote the film as a Diwali release. The strike was later withdrawn on 13 October 2017, after government agreed to reduce the entertainment tax from 8%. Vishal, the president of Tamil Film Producer Council, clarified about the film's release on the said date, the first film post-strike. However, the film was not screened at PVR and Inox on the day of release, as the multiplex chains continued the strike, but was withdrawn on 24 October 2017 and released the film on that date. Prior to the release, Vijay met chief minister Edappadi K. Palaniswami thanking the government for the reduction of entertainment tax, though media reports claimed that the meet is mostly due to resolving issues over the film.

=== Censorship issue ===
On 12 October 2017, the Animal Welfare Board of India (AWBI) denied the team's approval for NOC, for their using of few animals without their permission. This resulted in the denial of a censor certificate from the Central Board of Film Certification. The officials from the Censor Board said that the certain animals used during the film's production were real animals and not with the use of computer graphics, as a result, the team had approached AWBI for granting NOC. But the approval was rejected following the production team's failure to furnish the necessary documents. Two of the scenes under question were edited, so as to get approval from AWBI. On 16 October, the AWBI granted NOC for the film, citing that the necessary documents were submitted and also received censor certificate. As per the NOC certificate, there have been more than 110 animals been used in the film.

== Political controversies ==
Upon release, several notions expressed in the film were opposed by various organisations. The Bharatiya Janata Party (BJP), the ruling political party of Government of India, and the then ruling AIADMK had raised objections to the scenes in which the protagonist, played by Vijay, criticises the recently introduced Goods and Services Tax, and also a scene in which a character ridicules Digital India, an initiative promoted by the BJP. The party demanded that those scenes be cut from the film for future viewership. Tamilisai Soundararajan and H. Raja were among the few members who criticised the film's notions while, H. Raja posted a controversial tweet mentioning Vijay's religion and posting the actor's voter ID card, in response to the criticism against Vijay over running a "hatred campaign" against BJP.

=== Protests by Indian Medical Association ===
Several medical associations such as the Tamil Nadu Government Doctors' Association, condemned the film for the alleged cynical portrayal of doctors working in government-operated hospitals. Doctors working with the Indian Medical Association planned to boycott the film and shared links of the film on pirated websites online, in the hope that it would cause monetary losses to the makers of the film.

=== Reactions ===
The acts were seen as an attack on freedom of expression by opposing political parties and various other celebrities working in Tamil cinema. Shashi Tharoor condemned BJP's acts against Mersal, similar to infringement of democratic rights. Rajinikanth, Kamal Haasan, Vishal, Vijay Sethupathi, Arvind Swamy and Khushbu, extended his support towards Mersal and praised Vijay and the team for "bravely addressing social issues in the film". On 23 October 2017, after Vishal extended his support for the film, the office of his production house was raided by GST intelligence agency, but the officials claimed that they had nothing to do with the film and it was a routine procedure to monitor violations on tax deduction at source (TDS).

As H. Raja criticised the Censor Board officials over the film's certification after watching the film online, demanding that they should be removed from posts, Gautami Tadimalla, the member of CBFC who watched a screening of the film on 22 October, claimed that "Mersal has been given a fair censor certificate. There was no foul in the film’s dialogues with reference to GST, and asking the scenes to be lifted off the film is a direct threat to freedom of speech." The South Indian Film Chamber of Commerce wrote a letter to Smriti Irani, the Information and Broadcasting minister, seeking action against H. Raja for watching the pirated version of the film online.

The controversies surrounded over the film, affected its dubbed Telugu version Adirindhi as the censorship issues delayed the film's original release of 27 October 2017 to 9 November 2017. Prasoon Joshi, chief of CBFC approved the dubbed Telugu version without any cuts. The makers edited and trimmed the objectionable scenes in the television premiere of the film.

== Financial tussles ==
Though the film was touted to have an approximate collection of ₹250 crore, the production house Thenandal Studio Limited had to file for bankruptcy due to the high production costs involved. The social media propaganda loss of this film amounts to an approximate ₹60 crore, with references citing Atlee exceeding the production budget. However, G. Dhananjayan opined that the film was considered profitable to all distributors across Tamil Nadu region, as was, the film's producer Murali Ramaswamy. In November 2018, the Canada-based magician Raman Sharma, who worked in the project accused Thenandal Studios of non-payment of dues and slammed the company for their unprofessional behaviour. In August, Sharma's team sent a legal notice to the makers, demanding the rest of his payment under the Insolvency and Bankruptcy Code, 2016. The financial tussles surrounding over the production house led the makers shelve all of their upcoming projects: notably the company's big-budget film Sangamithra, Dhanush's untitled project with Karthik Subbaraj and his directorial film, (Note: The project was later exchanged to YNOT Studios and released under the title Jagame Thandhiram in 2021.) A. R. Rahman's virtual reality film Le Musk, and other productions; furthermore, their completed project Iravaakaalam remains unreleased.
