= L. Jaya Sudha =

Indian politician

Member of Tamil Nadu Legislative Assembly
- Incumbent
- Assumed office 6 May 2026
- Preceded by: Sevvoor S. Ramachandran
- Constituency: Arani
- In office 16 May 2011 – 19 May 2016
- Preceded by: P. S. Vijayakumar
- Succeeded by: K. V. Sekaran
- Constituency: Polur

Personal details
- Born: 19 June 1975 (age 51) Polur, Tamil Nadu, India
- Party: All India Anna Dravida Munnetra Kazhagam
- Spouse: K. Lakshmikanthan
- Occupation: Politician, Industry, Silk Trade, Rent Politics and Social Service

L. Jaya Sudha, also known as L. Jayasudha and L. Jayasudha Lakshmikanthan, (born 19 June 1975) is an Indian politician and was a member of the 14th Tamil Nadu Legislative Assembly from the Polur constituency. She represented the All India Anna Dravida Munnetra Kazhagam party. The party allocated her seat to C. M. Murugan to contest in the 2016 elections.

She became MLA for the second time winning the 2026 Tamil Nadu Legislative Assembly election from Aarani Assembly constituency.

Sudha was born on 19 June 1975 in Polur. She has a BA degree and is married with three children.

== Electoral performance ==
Election	Constituency	Party	Result	Votes %	Opposition Candidate	Opposition Party	Opposition vote %	Ref
2011	Polur	AIADMK	Won	55.42%	G. Ediroli Manian	PMK	38.30%	
2026	Aarani	AIADMK	Won	33.34%	Mahalakshmi Govarthanan	DMK	30.89%	-
