= S. Ramachandran (Kalasapakkam) =

Indian politician (born 1960)

Member of the Tamil Nadu Legislative Assembly
- Incumbent
- Assumed office 11 May 2026
- Preceded by: K. Pitchandi
- Constituency: Kilpennathur
- In office 14 May 2001 – 11 May 2006
- Preceded by: P. S. Thiruvengadam
- Succeeded by: Agri S. S. Krishnamurthy
- Constituency: Kalasapakkam

Personal details
- Born: 25 June 1960 (age 66) Desurpalayam, Tiruvannamalai, Tamil Nadu, India
- Party: All India Anna Dravida Munnetra Kazhagam
- Profession: Agriculture, Business

S. Ramachandran is an Indian politician and a former member of the Tamil Nadu Legislative Assembly. Hailing from Tiruvannamalai town in the Tiruvannamalai district, he completed his education up to the tenth grade. Representing the All India Anna Dravida Munnetra Kazhagam (AIADMK) party, he contested and won the 2001 Tamil Nadu Legislative Assembly election from the Kalasapakkam Assembly constituency.

== Electoral Performance ==
=== 2001 ===
2001 Tamil Nadu Legislative Assembly election: Kalasapakkam
Party	Candidate	Votes	%	±%
AIADMK	S. Ramachandran	75,880	58.05%	New
DMK	P. S. Thiruvengadam	46,990	35.95%	−23.17
Independent	N. Raju	3,103	2.37%	New
MDMK	A. A. Rajamanickam	2,328	1.78%	+0.8
Independent	P. Chandra	1,051	0.80%	New
Margin of victory		28,890	22.10%	−6.18%
Turnout		130,721	69.12%	−5.10%
Registered electors		189,131		
AIADMK gain from DMK		Swing	-1.07%	
