= Sivanandam =

Sivanandam may refer to

- R. Sivanandam Indian politician
- Thiagarajan Sivanandam Indian actor
