= P. S. Thiruvengadam =

Indian politician (1935–2022)

Member of Legislative Assembly of Tamil Nadu
- In office 13 May 1996 – 15 May 2001
- Preceded by: M. Sundarasami
- Succeeded by: Agri S. S. Krishnamoorthy
- Constituency: Kalasapakkam
- In office 27 January 1989 – 30 January 1991
- Preceded by: M. Pandurangan
- Succeeded by: M. Sundarasami
- Constituency: Kalasapakkam
- In office 1980–1984
- Succeeded by: M. Pandurangan
- Constituency: Kalasapakkam
- In office 1977–1980
- Preceded by: S. Murugaiyan
- Constituency: Kalasapakkam

Personal details
- Born: 17 August 1935 Periyakilambadi, Madras Presidency, British India
- Died: 12 September 2022 (aged 87)
- Party: Dravida Munnetra Kazhagam

Periyakilambadi Subburayan Thiruvengadam (17 August 1935 – 14 September 2022) was an Indian politician who served as member of the Tamil Nadu Legislative Assembly on four separate occasions. He was a member of the Dravida Munnetra Kazhagam (DMK), a Dravidian political party in the state of Tamil Nadu.

Thiruvengadam was elected to the Tamil Nadu legislative assembly from Kalasapakkam constituency as a Dravida Munnetra Kazhagam candidate in 1977, 1980, 1989, and 1996 elections. He was latterly a member of DMK Asset Protection Committee. This post was assigned to him by former chief minister of Tamil Nadu M. Karunanidhi.
