= Polur Assembly constituency =

State Legislative Assembly Constituency in Tamil Nadu

Coordinates: 12.51°N 79.12°E

Polur
- Constituency No. 66 for the Tamil Nadu Legislative Assembly

Constituency details
- Country: India
- Region: South India
- State: Tamil Nadu
- District: Tiruvannamalai
- Lok Sabha constituency: Arani
- Established: 1951
- Total electors: 2,35,091

Member of Legislative Assembly
- 17th Tamil Nadu Legislative Assembly
- Incumbent R. Abishek
- Party: TVK
- Elected year: 2026

Polur is a state assembly constituency in Tiruvannamalai district of Tamil Nadu, India. Its State Assembly Constituency number is 66. It comprises portions of the Chetpet, Pernamallur, Kalambur and Polur towns and unions. Polur is a part of Arani Lok Sabha constituency for national elections to the Parliament of India. It is one of the 234 State Legislative Assembly Constituencies in Tamil Nadu, in India.

== Members of Legislative Assembly ==
=== Madras State ===
Year	Winner	Party
1952	Manickavelu Naicker	Commonweal Party
1957	S. M. Annamalai	Dravida Munnetra Kazhagam
1962	Kesava Reddiar	Dravida Munnetra Kazhagam
1967	S. Kuppammal	Dravida Munnetra Kazhagam

=== Tamil Nadu ===
Year	Winner	Party
1971	T. P. Srinivasan	Dravida Munnetra Kazhagam
1977	K. J. Subramanian	All India Anna Dravida Munnetra Kazhagam
1980	L. Balaraman	Indian National Congress (I)
1984	J. Rajababu	Indian National Congress
1989	A. Rajendran	Dravida Munnetra Kazhagam
1991	T. Vediyappan	All India Anna Dravida Munnetra Kazhagam
1996	A. Rajendran	Dravida Munnetra Kazhagam
2001	Nalini Manokaran	All India Anna Dravida Munnetra Kazhagam
2006	P. S. Vijayakumar	Indian National Congress
2011	L. Jaya Sudha	All India Anna Dravida Munnetra Kazhagam
2016	K. V. Sekaran	Dravida Munnetra Kazhagam
2021	S. S. Agri Krishnamurthy	All India Anna Dravida Munnetra Kazhagam
2026	R. Abishek	Tamilaga Vettri Kazhagam

== Election results ==
Vote share of winning candidates
2026	32.10%
2021	48.65%
2016	34.02%
2011	55.42%
2006	47.08%
2001	51.31%
1996	55.45%
1991	62.13%
1989	38.80%
1984	62.40%
1980	48.92%
1977	37.82%
1971	57.92%
1967	56.92%
1962	62.16%
1957	42.96%
1952	54.65%

=== 2026 ===
2026 Tamil Nadu Legislative Assembly election: Polur
Party	Candidate	Votes	%	±%
TVK	Abishek. R	67,961	32.10	New
DMDK	Saravanan. P	67,734	31.99	New
PMK	Baskaran. C.R	61,444	29.02	New
NTK	Umadevi. A	6,425	3.03	▼2.05
Independent	Purusothaman. M	1,674	0.79	New
ACDP	Dhavamani. P	1,328	0.63	New
Veerath Thiyagi Viswanathadoss Thozhilalarkal Katchi	Shanmugavelu. A	970	0.46	New
Independent	Baskaran. C	908	0.43	New
RPI(A)	Banupriya. D	869	0.41	New
NOTA	NOTA	798	0.38	▼0.19
Independent	Subha. A	425	0.20	New
Independent	Saravanan. P	349	0.16	New
Aanaithinthiya Jananayaka Pathukappu Kazhagam	Manikandan. R	319	0.15	New
TVK	Syed Mukram. R.N	251	0.12	New
Independent	Ezhil Arasu. M M.A. L.L.M.	150	0.07	New
Independent	Saravanan. M	138	0.07	New
Margin of victory		227	0.11	▼4.73
Turnout		2,14,127	91.67	▲9.29
Registered electors		2,35,091		▼8,742
TVK gain from AIADMK		Swing	▲32.10	

=== 2021 ===
2021 Tamil Nadu Legislative Assembly election: Polur
Party	Candidate	Votes	%	±%
AIADMK	Agri S. S. Krishnamurthy	97,732	48.65%	+18.86
DMK	K.V. Sekaran.	88,007	43.81%	+9.79
NTK	L. Lavanya	10,197	5.08%	New
MNM	G. Kalavathi	1,580	0.79%	New
Independent	R. Daksnamoorthy	1,188	0.59%	New
NOTA	NOTA	1,144	0.57%	−0.06
Margin of victory		9,725	4.84%	0.61%
Turnout		200,868	82.38%	−3.48%
Rejected ballots		366	0.18%	
Registered electors		243,833		
AIADMK gain from DMK		Swing	14.63%	

=== 2016 ===
2016 Tamil Nadu Legislative Assembly election: Polur
Party	Candidate	Votes	%	±%
DMK	K. V. Sekaran	66,588	34.02%	New
AIADMK	M. Murugan	58,315	29.80%	−25.63
Independent	C. Elumalai	38,861	19.86%	New
PMK	A. Velayutham	17,184	8.78%	−29.52
CPI(M)	P. Selvan	5,000	2.55%	New
Independent	A. Dhashanamoorthy	1,858	0.95%	New
BJP	D. Tamilarasi	1,232	0.63%	−0.19
NOTA	NOTA	1,230	0.63%	New
Margin of victory		8,273	4.23%	−12.90%
Turnout		195,714	85.86%	1.02%
Registered electors		227,936		
DMK gain from AIADMK		Swing	-21.40%	

=== 2011 ===
2011 Tamil Nadu Legislative Assembly election: Polur
Party	Candidate	Votes	%	±%
AIADMK	L. Jaya Sudha	92,391	55.42%	+14.4
PMK	G. Ediroli Manian	63,846	38.30%	New
IJK	V. Perumal	2,320	1.39%	New
Independent	M. Munisamy	2,132	1.28%	New
Independent	D. Murugesan	1,881	1.13%	New
BJP	N. Venkatesan	1,360	0.82%	−1.03
Margin of victory		28,545	17.12%	11.06%
Turnout		166,702	84.85%	13.32%
Registered electors		196,477		
AIADMK gain from INC		Swing	8.34%	

=== 2006 ===
2006 Tamil Nadu Legislative Assembly election: Polur
Party	Candidate	Votes	%	±%
INC	P. S. Vijayakumar	58,595	47.08%	New
AIADMK	T. Vediyappan	51,051	41.02%	−10.3
DMDK	S. C. Purushothaman	6,867	5.52%	New
BJP	G. Elangeswaran	2,299	1.85%	New
Independent	M. B. Lakshmanan	2,089	1.68%	New
SP	G. Shanmugam	2,011	1.62%	New
Independent	M. Durairaj	815	0.65%	New
Independent	C. Sankar	729	0.59%	New
Margin of victory		7,544	6.06%	−3.23%
Turnout		124,456	71.53%	5.29%
Registered electors		173,999		
INC gain from AIADMK		Swing	-4.23%	

=== 2001 ===
2001 Tamil Nadu Legislative Assembly election: Polur
Party	Candidate	Votes	%	±%
AIADMK	Nalini Manokaran	59,678	51.31%	New
DMK	C. Elumalai	48,871	42.02%	−13.43
Independent	J. Jayachandran	2,524	2.17%	New
MDMK	A. Karthikeyan	1,896	1.63%	New
Puratchi Bharatham	J. Bhaskar	1,647	1.42%	New
Independent	M. Durairaj	1,002	0.86%	New
Independent	M. Muniappan	680	0.58%	New
Margin of victory		10,807	9.29%	
Turnout		116,298	66.23%	−4.75%
Registered electors		175,601		
AIADMK gain from DMK		Swing	-4.14%	

=== 1996 ===
1996 Tamil Nadu Legislative Assembly election: Polur
Party	Candidate	Votes	%	±%
DMK	A. Rajendran	59,070	55.45%	+33.15
Margin of victory		{{{votes}}}	{{{percentage}}}	
Turnout		106,525	70.98%	3.85%
Registered electors		159,775		
DMK gain from AIADMK		Swing	-6.67%	

=== 1991 ===
1991 Tamil Nadu Legislative Assembly election: Polur
Party	Candidate	Votes	%	±%
AIADMK	T. Vediyappan	60,262	62.13%	+35.83
DMK	A. Rajendran	21,637	22.31%	−16.49
PMK	K. G. Elumalai	13,026	13.43%	New
AAP	S. Santha	705	0.73%	New
Independent	M. Annamalai	505	0.52%	New
Margin of victory		38,625	39.82%	27.32%
Turnout		97,001	67.13%	4.37%
Registered electors		151,807		
AIADMK gain from DMK		Swing	23.33%	

=== 1989 ===
1989 Tamil Nadu Legislative Assembly election: Polur
Party	Candidate	Votes	%	±%
DMK	A. Rajendran	31,478	38.80%	+2.71
AIADMK	S. Kannan	21,334	26.29%	New
INC	J. Rajababu	15,453	19.05%	−43.36
AIADMK	A. Selvan	12,096	14.91%	New
Independent	T. C. Manilingam	527	0.65%	New
Margin of victory		10,144	12.50%	−13.82%
Turnout		81,137	62.76%	−12.26%
Registered electors		132,966		
DMK gain from INC		Swing	-23.61%	

=== 1984 ===
1984 Tamil Nadu Legislative Assembly election: Polur
Party	Candidate	Votes	%	±%
INC	J. Rajababu	52,437	62.40%	+13.48
DMK	T. K. Subramantan	30,319	36.08%	New
Independent	R. Shunmugam	1,273	1.51%	New
Margin of victory		22,118	26.32%	23.35%
Turnout		84,029	75.02%	8.74%
Registered electors		116,495		
INC hold		Swing	13.48%	

=== 1980 ===
1980 Tamil Nadu Legislative Assembly election: Polur
Party	Candidate	Votes	%	±%
INC	L. Balaraman	35,456	48.92%	+39.14
AIADMK	A. Selvan	33,303	45.95%	+8.14
Independent	K. G. Vediappan	1,898	2.62%	New
Independent	K. J. Subramanian	1,183	1.63%	New
Independent	P. C. Murugesa Gounder	635	0.88%	New
Margin of victory		2,153	2.97%	−1.22%
Turnout		72,475	66.28%	4.05%
Registered electors		111,477		
INC gain from AIADMK		Swing	11.11%	

=== 1977 ===
1977 Tamil Nadu Legislative Assembly election: Polur
Party	Candidate	Votes	%	±%
AIADMK	K. J. Subramanian	24,631	37.82%	New
DMK	S. Murugaiyan	21,902	33.63%	−24.29
JP	T. M. Subramanian	11,279	17.32%	New
INC	S. M. Annamalai	6,373	9.78%	−32.3
Independent	A. P. Ramachandran	950	1.46%	New
Margin of victory		2,729	4.19%	−11.65%
Turnout		65,135	62.23%	−11.05%
Registered electors		107,103		
AIADMK gain from DMK		Swing	-20.10%	

=== 1971 ===
1971 Tamil Nadu Legislative Assembly election: Polur
Party	Candidate	Votes	%	±%
DMK	T. P. Srinivasan	34,728	57.92%	+0.99
INC	T. R. Natesa Gounder	25,232	42.08%	+7.5
Margin of victory		9,496	15.84%	−6.51%
Turnout		59,960	73.28%	−1.93%
Registered electors		85,660		
DMK hold		Swing	0.99%	

=== 1967 ===
1967 Madras Legislative Assembly election: Polur
Party	Candidate	Votes	%	±%
DMK	S. Kuppamal	33,292	56.92%	−5.23
INC	S. M. Annamalai	20,224	34.58%	−3.26
Independent	P. Kothandaraman	4,969	8.50%	New
Margin of victory		13,068	22.34%	−1.97%
Turnout		58,485	75.20%	15.23%
Registered electors		81,835		
DMK hold		Swing	-5.23%	

=== 1962 ===
1962 Madras Legislative Assembly election: Polur
Party	Candidate	Votes	%	±%
DMK	Kesava Reddiar	29,283	62.16%	New
INC	Periasami	17,828	37.84%	+18.85
Margin of victory		11,455	24.31%	7.84%
Turnout		47,111	59.98%	11.10%
Registered electors		82,973		
DMK gain from Independent		Swing	19.20%	

=== 1957 ===
1957 Madras Legislative Assembly election: Polur
Party	Candidate	Votes	%	±%
Independent	S. M. Annamalai	17,222	42.96%	New
Independent	T. B. Kesava Reddiar	10,616	26.48%	New
INC	V. Krishnakanthan	7,613	18.99%	−26.36
Independent	Vediappa Mudaliar	4,059	10.13%	New
Independent	Purushothama Mudali	578	1.44%	New
Margin of victory		6,606	16.48%	7.18%
Turnout		40,088	48.88%	−5.51%
Registered electors		82,019		
Independent gain from Commonweal Party		Swing	-11.69%	

=== 1952 ===
1952 Madras Legislative Assembly election: Polur
Party	Candidate	Votes	%	±%
Commonweal Party	M. A. Manickavelu Naicker	19,508	54.65%	New
INC	Annamalai Chetty	16,190	45.35%	New
Margin of victory		3,318	9.29%	
Turnout		35,698	54.39%	
Registered electors		65,635		
Commonweal Party win (new seat)				
