= Nalini Manokaran =

Indian politician

Member of the Legislative Assembly-Tamil Nadu
- In office 2001–2006
- Preceded by: A. Rajendran
- Succeeded by: P. S. Vijayakumar
- Constituency: Polur

Personal details
- Born: 27 October 1965 Chennai
- Party: All India Anna Dravida Munnetra Kazhagam
- Profession: Farmer

Nalini Manokaran is an Indian politician and a former Member of the Legislative Assembly (MLA) of Tamil Nadu. She hails from Kuppam village in the Tiruvannamalai district. Having completed her education up to the tenth grade, she is a member of the All India Anna Dravida Munnetra Kazhagam (AIADMK) party. She contested and won the 2001 Tamil Nadu Legislative Assembly election from the Polur Assembly constituency to become a Member of the Legislative Assembly.

== Electoral Performance ==
=== 2001 ===
2001 Tamil Nadu Legislative Assembly election: Polur
Party	Candidate	Votes	%	±%
AIADMK	Nalini Manokaran	59,678	51.31%	New
DMK	C. Elumalai	48,871	42.02%	−13.43
Independent	J. Jayachandran	2,524	2.17%	New
MDMK	A. Karthikeyan	1,896	1.63%	New
Puratchi Bharatham	J. Bhaskar	1,647	1.42%	New
Independent	M. Durairaj	1,002	0.86%	New
Independent	M. Muniappan	680	0.58%	New
Margin of victory		10,807	9.29%	
Turnout		116,298	66.23%	−4.75%
Registered electors		175,601		
AIADMK gain from DMK		Swing	-4.14%	
