= Tiruvannamalai Lok Sabha constituency =

Parliamentary constituency in Tamil Nadu, India

Coordinates: 12.2°N 79.1°E

Tiruvannamalai
- Lok Sabha constituency
- Interactive map of Tiruvannamalai Loksabha constituency, post-2008 delimitation

Constituency details
- Country: India
- Region: South India
- State: Tamil Nadu
- Assembly constituencies: Jolarpet; Tirupattur; Chengam; Tiruvannamalai; Kilpennathur; Kalasapakkam
- Established: 2008
- Total electors: 1,470,203
- Reservation: None

Member of Parliament
- 18th Lok Sabha
- Incumbent C. N. Annadurai
- Party: DMK
- Alliance: None
- Elected year: 2024
- Preceded by: R. Vanaroja

Tiruvannamalai Lok Sabha constituency (Tamil: திருவண்ணாமலை மக்களவைத் தொகுதி) is one of the 39 Lok Sabha (parliamentary) constituencies in Tamil Nadu, a state in southern India. Its Tamil Nadu Parliamentary Constituency number is 11.

== Assembly Segments ==
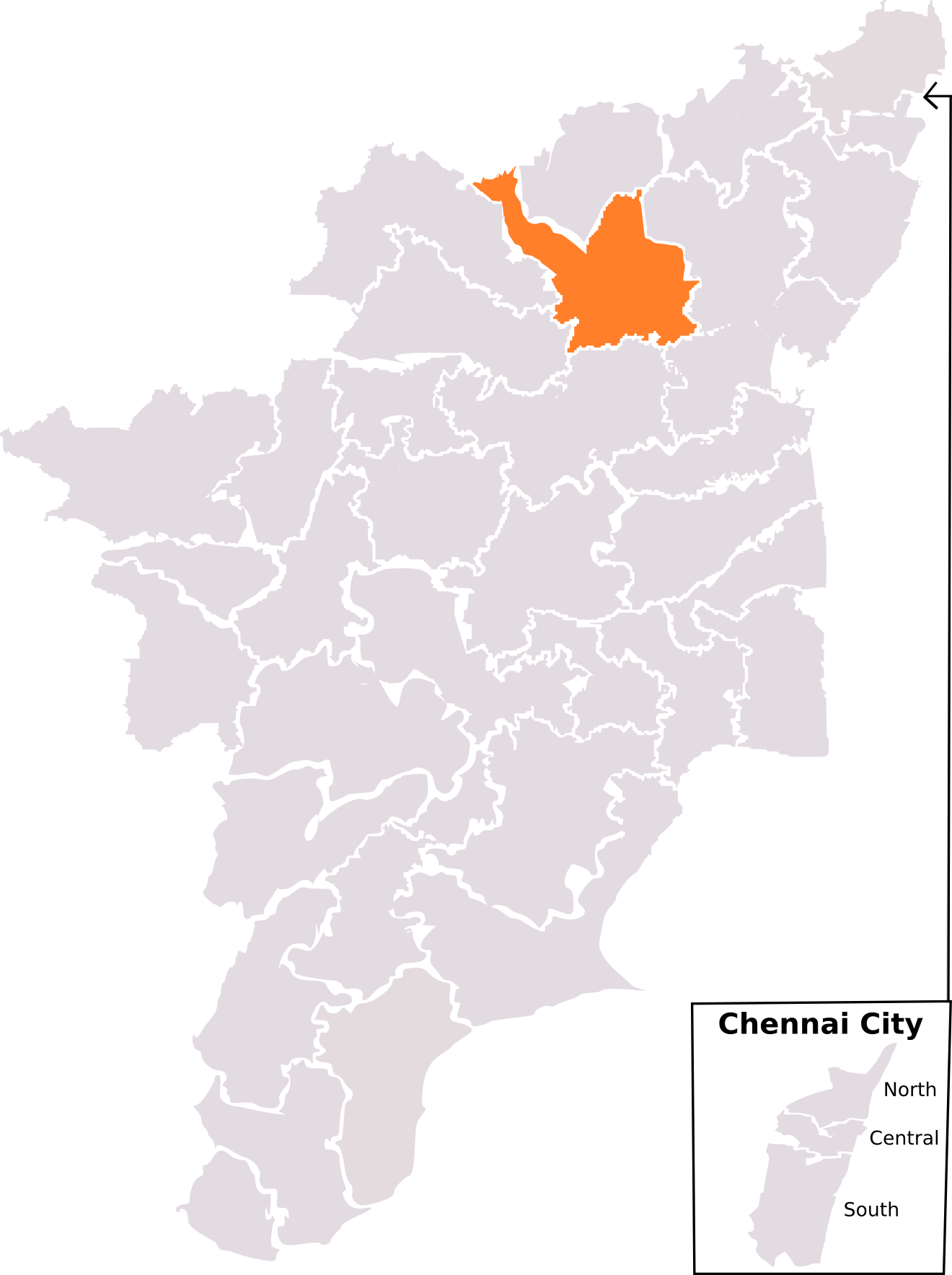
Tiruvannamalai constituency as laid out by 2008 Delimitation

Tiruvannamalai Lok Sabha constituency comprises the following legislative assembly segments:

Constituency number	Name	Reserved for (SC/ST/None)	District	Party	2024 Lead
49	Jolarpet	None	Tirupathur	AIADMK	DMK
50	Tirupattur	None	Tirupathur	TVK	DMK
62	Chengam	SC	Tiruvannamalai	AIADMK	DMK
63	Tiruvannamalai	None	Tiruvannamalai	DMK	DMK
64	Kilpennathur	None	Tiruvannamalai	AIADMK	DMK
65	Kalasapakkam	None	Tiruvannamalai	AIADMK	DMK

== Members of the Parliament ==
Year	Winner	Party
2009	D. Venugopal	Dravida Munnetra Kazhagam
2014	R. Vanaroja	All India Anna Dravida Munnetra Kazhagam
2019	C. N. Annadurai	Dravida Munnetra Kazhagam
2024	C. N. Annadurai	Dravida Munnetra Kazhagam

== Election results ==
Vote share of Winning candidates
2024	47.75%
2019	58.21%
2014	47.34%
2009	52.10%
1962	48.99%
1957	41.75%

=== General Elections 2024 ===
2024 Indian general election: Tiruvannamalai
Party	Candidate	Votes	%	±%
DMK	Annadurai C N	547,379	47.75	▼10.46
AIADMK	M. Kaliyaperumal	313,448	27.34	▼4.30
BJP	Ashvathaman	156,650	13.67	▲13.67
NOTA	None of the above	11,957	1.04	▼0.04
Margin of victory		233,931	20.41	▼6.17
Turnout		1,146,273	74.24	▼3.52
Registered electors		15,33,099		
DMK hold		Swing		

=== General Elections 2019 ===
2019 Indian general election: Tiruvannamalai
Party	Candidate	Votes	%	±%
DMK	Annadurai C N	666,272	58.21	26.81
AIADMK	Agri S. S. Krishnamurthy	3,62,085	31.64	−15.70
Independent	A. Gnanasekar	38,639	3.38	
MNM	R. Arul	14,654	1.28	
NOTA	None of the above	12,317	1.08	0.17
Margin of victory		3,04,187	26.58	10.64
Turnout		11,44,549	77.66	−0.53
Registered electors		14,73,862		8.94
DMK gain from AIADMK		Swing	10.88	

=== General Elections 2014 ===
2014 Indian general election: Tiruvannamalai
Party	Candidate	Votes	%	±%
AIADMK	R. Vanaroja	500,751	47.34	
DMK	Annadurai C N	3,32,145	31.40	−20.70
PMK	G. Ediroli Manian	1,57,954	14.93	
INC	A. Subramaniyan	17,854	1.69	
Independent	K. Murugesan	10,708	1.01	
NOTA	None of the above	9,595	0.91	
SP	C. Arumugam	6,278	0.59	
Margin of victory		1,68,606	15.94	−1.75
Turnout		10,57,852	78.19	−1.47
Registered electors		13,52,966		28.54
AIADMK gain from DMK		Swing	-4.77	

=== General Elections 2009 ===
2009 Indian general election: Tiruvannamalai
Party	Candidate	Votes	%	±%
DMK	D. Venugopal	436,866	52.10	
PMK	Kaduvetti Guru	2,88,566	34.42	
DMDK	S. Manikandan	56,960	6.79	
LJP	K. S. Afroz Husna	5,798	0.69	
Independent	R. Ravi	5,432	0.65	
Independent	M. Shanmugavel	5,126	0.61	
Independent	S. Guru (A) Gurumoorthy	4,927	0.59	
BSP	P. Govindasamy	4,731	0.56	
Margin of victory		1,48,300	17.69	
Turnout		10,52,587	79.66	
Rejected ballots		330	0.04	
DMK win (new seat)				

=== General Elections 1962 ===
1962 Indian general election: Tiruvannamalai
Party	Candidate	Votes	%	±%
DMK	Dharmalingam	141,254	48.99	
INC	G. Neelakantan	1,37,528	47.69	11.02
Independent	Arjuna Gounder	9,574	3.32	
Margin of victory		3,726	1.29	−3.78
Turnout		2,88,356	66.61	19.28
Registered electors		4,49,968		5.46
DMK gain from Independent		Swing	7.24	

=== General Elections 1957 ===
1957 Indian general election: Tiruvannamalai
Party	Candidate	Votes	%	±%
Independent	Dharmalingam	84,309	41.75	
INC	G. Neelakantan	74,070	36.68	
Independent	T. P. Thayuman	25,145	12.45	
Independent	N. Munisami	18,436	9.13	
Independent	Doraiswamy Reddiar	0	0.00	
Margin of victory		10,239	5.07	
Turnout		2,01,960	47.33	
Registered electors		4,26,665		
Independent win (new seat)				
