= R. M. Babu Murugavel =

Indian politician

Member of the Tamil Nadu Legislative Assembly
- In office 2011–2016
- Constituency: Aarani

Personal details
- Party: Desiya Murpokku Dravida Kazhagam

R. M. Babu Murugavel is an Indian politician and a member of the 14th Tamil Nadu Legislative Assembly from the Arni constituency. He represented the Desiya Murpokku Dravidar Kazhagam party.

The elections of 2016 resulted in his constituency being won by S. Sevoor Ramachandran. He is currently under Edapadi Palaniswamy's AIADMK as Advocate wing State joint secretary, the party's official spokesman and a member of the legal advisory committee.

== Electoral performance ==
Election	Constituency	Political party	Result	Vote %	Opposition			Ref
Election	Constituency	Political party	Result	Vote %	Candidate	Political party	Vote %	Ref
2011	Aarani	DMDK	Won	50.06%	R. Sivanandam	DMK	45.58%	
2016	Aarani	DMDK	Lost	3.35%	Sevvoor S. Ramachandran	AIADMK	44.89%	
