= Injimedu =

Injimedu Yagnamedu
- village
- Location in Tamil Nadu, India Injimedu (India)
- Coordinates: 12°32′36″N 79°25′25″E
- Country: India
- State: Tamil Nadu
- District: Tiruvannamalai

Population (2001)
  - Total: 1,663

Languages
  - Official: Tamil
- Time zone: UTC+5:30 (IST)
- PIN: 604503
- Telephone code: 91(04183)-
- Vehicle registration: TN-25
- Nearest city: Vellore Aarani and Vandavasi
- Sex ratio: 0.93 ♂/♀
- Literacy: 95%
- Avg. summer temperature: 40 °C (104 °F)
- Avg. winter temperature: 20 °C (68 °F)-25 °C (77 °F)
- Website: www.injimedu.in

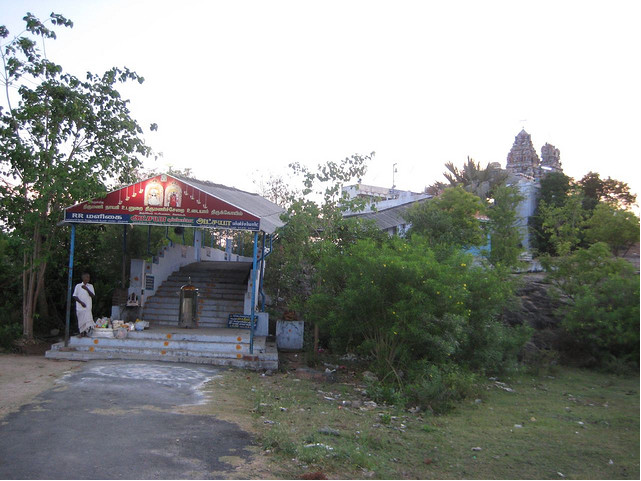
Periyamalai Shiva Temple

Injimedu is a village in Vandavasi taluk, Tiruvannamalai District, state of Tamil Nadu, India. As of the 2001 census, it had a population of 1,663 in 406 households.

== Landmarks ==
- Injimedu Periyamalai Temple is dedicated to Lord Shiva.
- An epigraph by Chola King Vikramadhitya located atop a hillock that dates back to 1126 A.D. and describes the story of Lord Shiva

== Transport ==
Injimedu is located at 3 km from the town Peranamallur. The route to go Injimedu is

1. Kancheepuram - Cheyyaru - Pernamallur - Injimedu
2. Tambaram - Uthiramerur - Vandavasi - Mazhaiyur (Chetpet Road) - Chinna kozhipuliyur - Injimedu.
