= A. K. Aranganathan =

Indian politician

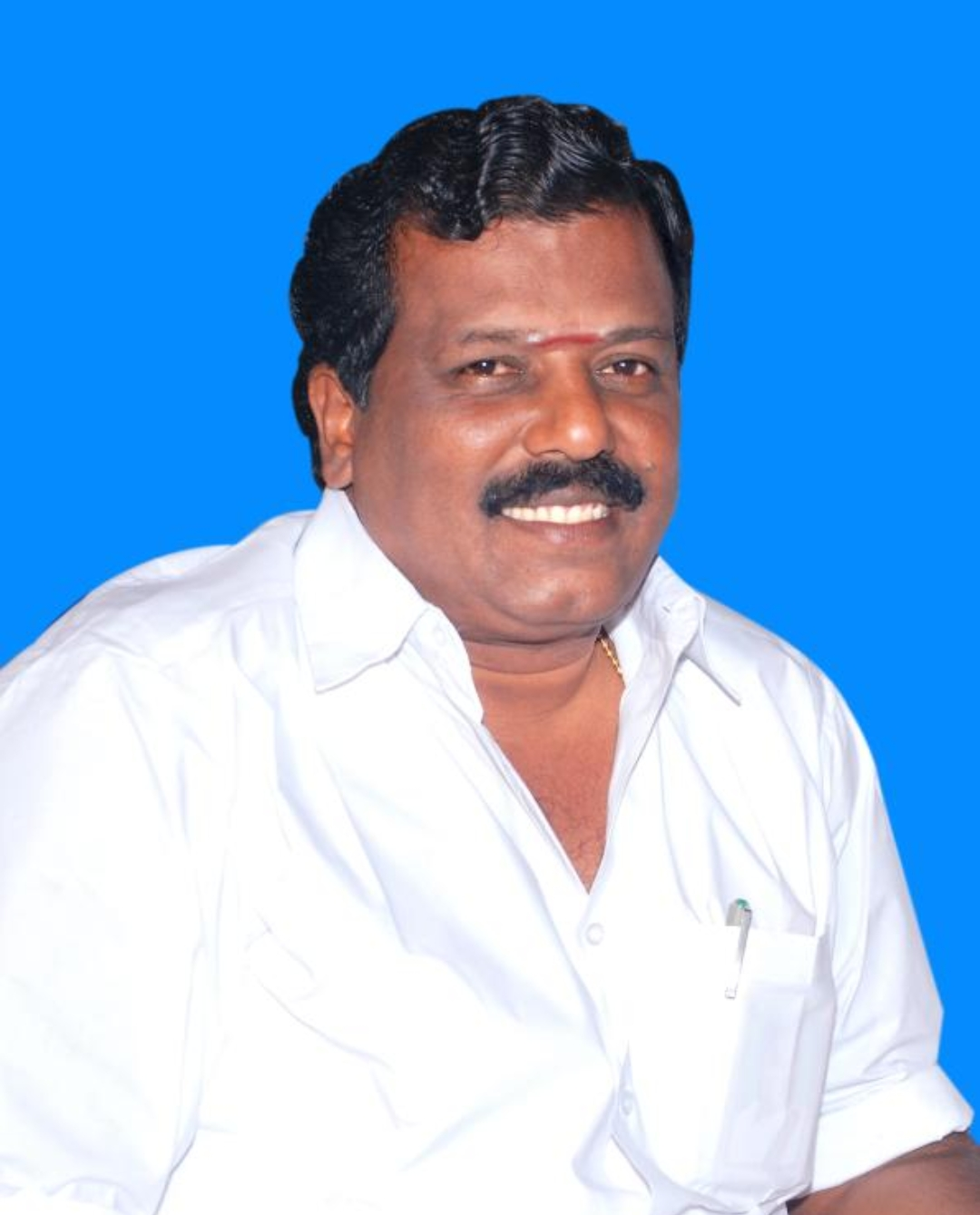
A. K. Aranganathan

A. K. Aranganathan is an Indian politician and was a member of the 14th Tamil Nadu Legislative Assembly from the Kilpennathur constituency. He represented the All India Anna Dravida Munnetra Kazhagam party.

He was defeated in the elections of 2016 by K. Pitchandi. A. K. Aranganathan is only the first to have defeated K. Pitchandi in 2011. The history was created by him, K. Pitchandi his only win in Kilpennathur constituency but A. K. Aranganathan broke his record.
