= Kalasapakkam Assembly constituency =

State Legislative Assembly Constituency in Tamil Nadu

Coordinates: 12°25′0″N 79°6′0″E

Kalasapakkam
- Constituency No. 65 for the Tamil Nadu Legislative Assembly

Constituency details
- Country: India
- Region: South India
- State: Tamil Nadu
- District: Tiruvannamalai
- Lok Sabha constituency: Tiruvannamalai
- Established: 1951
- Total electors: 2,33,595
- Reservation: None

Member of Legislative Assembly
- 17th Tamil Nadu Legislative Assembly
- Incumbent Agri S. S. Krishnamoorthy
- Party: AIADMK
- Alliance: NDA
- Elected year: 2026

Kalasapakkam is a state assembly constituency in Tiruvannamalai district of Tamil Nadu, India. It comprises portions of the Kalasapakkam, Polur and Chengam taluks and is a part of Tiruvannamalai Lok Sabha constituency for national elections to the Parliament of India. This constituency did not exist during the elections held in 1957 and 1962. It is one of the 234 State Legislative Assembly Constituencies in Tamil Nadu, in India.

== Members of Legislative Assembly ==
=== Madras State ===
| Year | Winner | Party |
|---|---|---|
| 1952 | Nataraja Mudaliar | Independent |
| 1957 | | |
| 1962 | | |
| 1967 | S. Murugaiyan | Indian National Congress |

=== Tamil Nadu ===
| Year | Winner | Party |
|---|---|---|
| 1971 | S. Murugaiyan | Dravida Munnetra Kazhagam |
| 1977 | P. S. Thiruvengadam | Dravida Munnetra Kazhagam |
| 1980 | P. S. Thiruvengadam | Dravida Munnetra Kazhagam |
| 1984 | M. Pandurangan | All India Anna Dravida Munnetra Kazhagam |
| 1989 | P. S. Thiruvengadam | Dravida Munnetra Kazhagam |
| 1991 | M. Sundarasami | Indian National Congress |
| 1996 | P. S. Thiruvengadam | Dravida Munnetra Kazhagam |
| 2001 | S. Ramachandran | All India Anna Dravida Munnetra Kazhagam |
| 2006 | Agri S. S. Krishnamoorthy | All India Anna Dravida Munnetra Kazhagam |
| 2011 | Agri S. S. Krishnamoorthy | All India Anna Dravida Munnetra Kazhagam |
| 2016 | V. Panneerselvam | All India Anna Dravida Munnetra Kazhagam |
| 2021 | P. S. T. Saravanan | Dravida Munnetra Kazhagam |
| 2026 | Agri S. S. Krishnamoorthy | All India Anna Dravida Munnetra Kazhagam |

== Election results ==
Vote share of winning candidates
| 2026 | 41.86% |
| 2021 | 47.92% |
| 2016 | 45.41% |
| 2011 | 58.95% |
| 2006 | 48.23% |
| 2001 | 58.05% |
| 1996 | 59.12% |
| 1991 | 57.35% |
| 1989 | 48.24% |
| 1984 | 58.78% |
| 1980 | 54.49% |
| 1977 | 35.39% |
| 1971 | 58.88% |
| 1967 | 51.37% |
| 1952 | 54.09% |

=== 2026 ===
2026 Tamil Nadu Legislative Assembly election: Kalasapakkam
| Party | Candidate | Votes | % | ±% |
|---|---|---|---|---|
| AIADMK | Agri Krishnamurthy. S.S | 89,629 | 41.86 | ▼1.37 |
| DMK | Saravanan. P.S.T | 62,889 | 29.37 | ▼18.55 |
| TVK | Elumalai. P | 51,666 | 24.13 | New |
| NTK | Seetha Sivanandam. P | 5,312 | 2.48 | ▼2.01 |
| Independent | Santhakumaran. A | 697 | 0.33 | New |
| Independent | Deiveegan. P | 654 | 0.31 | New |
| Independent | Krishnamurthy. R | 576 | 0.27 | New |
| Independent | Balaji. P | 433 | 0.20 | New |
| NOTA | NOTA | 423 | 0.20 | ▼0.61 |
| Independent | Saravanan. K | 405 | 0.19 | New |
| Naadaalum Makkal Katchi | Sathya. V | 245 | 0.11 | New |
| Independent | Kamaraj. G | 198 | 0.09 | New |
| Independent | Kothandapani. B | 175 | 0.08 | New |
| Independent | Raja. N | 156 | 0.07 | New |
| Independent | Manikandan. K | 147 | 0.07 | New |
| Independent | Krishnamurthy. M | 105 | 0.05 | New |
| TVK | Saravanan. V | 102 | 0.05 | New |
| Aanaithinthiya Jananayaka Pathukappu Kazhagam | Suman. M | 91 | 0.04 | New |
| Independent | Baskaran. R | 75 | 0.04 | New |
| Independent | Krishnamurthy. S | 66 | 0.03 | New |
| Independent | Elumalai. S | 46 | 0.02 | New |
| Independent | Elumalai. T | 37 | 0.02 | New |
| Margin of victory | | 26,740 | 12.49 | ▲7.80 |
| Turnout | | 2,14,127 | 91.67 | ▲10.77 |
| Registered electors | | 2,33,595 | | ▼9,205 |
| AIADMK gain from DMK | | Swing | ▼1.37 | |

=== 2021 ===
2021 Tamil Nadu Legislative Assembly election: Kalasapakkam
| Party | Candidate | Votes | % | ±% |
|---|---|---|---|---|
| DMK | P. S. T. Saravanan | 94,134 | 47.92% | New |
| AIADMK | V. Panneerselvam | 84,912 | 43.23% | −2.18 |
| NTK | E. Balaji | 8,822 | 4.49% | New |
| DMDK | M. Nehru | 2,756 | 1.40% | −3.94 |
| NOTA | NOTA | 1,595 | 0.81% | −0 |
| Margin of victory | | 9,222 | 4.69% | −9.52% |
| Turnout | | 196,434 | 80.90% | −3.85% |
| Rejected ballots | | 146 | 0.07% | |
| Registered electors | | 242,800 | | |
| DMK gain from AIADMK | | Swing | 2.51% | |

=== 2016 ===
2016 Tamil Nadu Legislative Assembly election: Kalasapakkam
| Party | Candidate | Votes | % | ±% |
|---|---|---|---|---|
| AIADMK | V. Panneerselvam | 84,394 | 45.41% | −13.54 |
| INC | G. Kumar | 57,980 | 31.20% | −3.21 |
| PMK | R. Kalidass | 23,825 | 12.82% | New |
| DMDK | M. Nehru | 9,932 | 5.34% | New |
| NOTA | NOTA | 1,510 | 0.81% | New |
| Independent | P. Rajaprabu | 1,387 | 0.75% | New |
| Independent | E. Rajkumar | 1,047 | 0.56% | New |
| Margin of victory | | 26,414 | 14.21% | −10.33% |
| Turnout | | 185,859 | 84.75% | −1.61% |
| Registered electors | | 219,301 | | |
| AIADMK hold | | Swing | -13.54% | |

=== 2011 ===
2011 Tamil Nadu Legislative Assembly election: Kalasapakkam
| Party | Candidate | Votes | % | ±% |
|---|---|---|---|---|
| AIADMK | Agri S. S. Krishnamurthy | 91,833 | 58.95% | +10.71 |
| INC | P. S. Vijayakumar | 53,599 | 34.40% | New |
| Independent | A. Vijayakumar | 2,615 | 1.68% | New |
| BSP | S. Devendiran | 1,656 | 1.06% | New |
| IJK | M. S. Rajendran | 1,329 | 0.85% | New |
| BJP | K. Amesh | 1,323 | 0.85% | −0.43 |
| Margin of victory | | 38,234 | 24.54% | 19.15% |
| Turnout | | 155,790 | 86.36% | 8.23% |
| Registered electors | | 180,390 | | |
| AIADMK hold | | Swing | 10.71% | |

=== 2006 ===
2006 Tamil Nadu Legislative Assembly election: Kalasapakkam
| Party | Candidate | Votes | % | ±% |
|---|---|---|---|---|
| AIADMK | Agri S. S. Krishnamurthy | 68,586 | 48.23% | −9.81 |
| PMK | R. Kalodoss | 60,920 | 42.84% | New |
| DMDK | L. Sankar | 5,069 | 3.56% | New |
| Independent | M. Jagadeeswaran | 1,902 | 1.34% | New |
| BJP | V. Ramakrishnan | 1,818 | 1.28% | New |
| Independent | S. Arumugam | 1,103 | 0.78% | New |
| Independent | S. Selvaraj | 978 | 0.69% | New |
| Independent | V. Sekar | 944 | 0.66% | New |
| Margin of victory | | 7,666 | 5.39% | −16.71% |
| Turnout | | 142,192 | 78.14% | 9.02% |
| Registered electors | | 181,980 | | |
| AIADMK hold | | Swing | -9.81% | |

=== 2001 ===
2001 Tamil Nadu Legislative Assembly election: Kalasapakkam
| Party | Candidate | Votes | % | ±% |
|---|---|---|---|---|
| AIADMK | S. Ramachandran | 75,880 | 58.05% | New |
| DMK | P. S. Thiruvengadam | 46,990 | 35.95% | −23.17 |
| Independent | N. Raju | 3,103 | 2.37% | New |
| MDMK | A. A. Rajamanickam | 2,328 | 1.78% | +0.8 |
| Independent | P. Chandra | 1,051 | 0.80% | New |
| Margin of victory | | 28,890 | 22.10% | −6.18% |
| Turnout | | 130,721 | 69.12% | −5.10% |
| Registered electors | | 189,131 | | |
| AIADMK gain from DMK | | Swing | -1.07% | |

=== 1996 ===
1996 Tamil Nadu Legislative Assembly election: Kalasapakkam
| Party | Candidate | Votes | % | ±% |
|---|---|---|---|---|
| DMK | P. S. Thiruvengadam | 72,177 | 59.12% | +30.79 |
| INC | M. Sundarasami | 37,647 | 30.83% | −26.52 |
| PMK | S. Babu Kander | 9,901 | 8.11% | New |
| MDMK | S. Arivalagan | 1,194 | 0.98% | New |
| Margin of victory | | 34,530 | 28.28% | −0.74% |
| Turnout | | 122,092 | 74.22% | −1.04% |
| Registered electors | | 169,589 | | |
| DMK gain from INC | | Swing | 1.76% | |

=== 1991 ===
1991 Tamil Nadu Legislative Assembly election: Kalasapakkam
| Party | Candidate | Votes | % | ±% |
|---|---|---|---|---|
| INC | M. Sundarasami | 65,096 | 57.35% | +41.87 |
| DMK | P. S. Thiruvengadam | 32,152 | 28.33% | −19.91 |
| PMK | R. Kalaiselvan | 12,762 | 11.24% | New |
| BJP | P. Sripathi | 1,501 | 1.32% | New |
| Independent | S. Praphu | 984 | 0.87% | New |
| Independent | M. Saravanan | 668 | 0.59% | New |
| Margin of victory | | 32,944 | 29.03% | 7.01% |
| Turnout | | 113,497 | 75.25% | 2.97% |
| Registered electors | | 156,148 | | |
| INC gain from DMK | | Swing | 9.11% | |

=== 1989 ===
1989 Tamil Nadu Legislative Assembly election: Kalasapakkam
| Party | Candidate | Votes | % | ±% |
|---|---|---|---|---|
| DMK | P. S. Thiruvengadam | 47,535 | 48.24% | +10.49 |
| AIADMK | S. Krishnamurthy | 25,840 | 26.22% | −32.55 |
| INC | K. P. K. Thangamani | 15,257 | 15.48% | New |
| AIADMK | M. Pandurangan | 8,533 | 8.66% | −50.12 |
| Independent | L. Chokkalan | 510 | 0.52% | New |
| Margin of victory | | 21,695 | 22.02% | 0.99% |
| Turnout | | 98,533 | 72.28% | −8.35% |
| Registered electors | | 140,054 | | |
| DMK gain from AIADMK | | Swing | -10.54% | |

=== 1984 ===
1984 Tamil Nadu Legislative Assembly election: Kalasapakkam
| Party | Candidate | Votes | % | ±% |
|---|---|---|---|---|
| AIADMK | M. Pandurangam | 54,969 | 58.78% | +18.79 |
| DMK | P. S. Thiruvengadam | 35,303 | 37.75% | −16.74 |
| Independent | M. Seetharaman | 3,245 | 3.47% | New |
| Margin of victory | | 19,666 | 21.03% | 6.53% |
| Turnout | | 93,517 | 80.63% | 7.04% |
| Registered electors | | 123,335 | | |
| AIADMK gain from DMK | | Swing | 4.29% | |

=== 1980 ===
1980 Tamil Nadu Legislative Assembly election: Kalasapakkam
| Party | Candidate | Votes | % | ±% |
|---|---|---|---|---|
| DMK | P. S. Thiruvengadam | 44,923 | 54.49% | +19.1 |
| AIADMK | C. N. Visvanathan | 32,972 | 39.99% | +6.64 |
| Independent | C. Dhanapal | 2,994 | 3.63% | New |
| Independent | A. P. Natesan | 1,554 | 1.88% | New |
| Margin of victory | | 11,951 | 14.50% | 12.46% |
| Turnout | | 82,443 | 73.60% | 6.33% |
| Registered electors | | 114,081 | | |
| DMK hold | | Swing | 19.10% | |

=== 1977 ===
1977 Tamil Nadu Legislative Assembly election: Kalasapakkam
| Party | Candidate | Votes | % | ±% |
|---|---|---|---|---|
| DMK | P. S. Thiruvengadam | 26,841 | 35.39% | −23.49 |
| AIADMK | S. Sundaresa Udayar | 25,298 | 33.35% | New |
| INC | A. Mannankatti Kandar | 16,893 | 22.27% | −18.85 |
| JP | G. Rajakumar | 5,591 | 7.37% | New |
| Independent | N. C. Marimuthu | 1,228 | 1.62% | New |
| Margin of victory | | 1,543 | 2.03% | −15.72% |
| Turnout | | 75,851 | 67.26% | −10.06% |
| Registered electors | | 114,750 | | |
| DMK hold | | Swing | -23.49% | |

=== 1971 ===
1971 Tamil Nadu Legislative Assembly election: Kalasapakkam
| Party | Candidate | Votes | % | ±% |
|---|---|---|---|---|
| DMK | S. Murugaiyan | 42,893 | 58.88% | +26.58 |
| INC | M. Sundraswamy | 29,960 | 41.12% | −10.25 |
| Margin of victory | | 12,933 | 17.75% | −1.33% |
| Turnout | | 72,853 | 77.32% | 4.52% |
| Registered electors | | 96,470 | | |
| DMK gain from INC | | Swing | 7.50% | |

=== 1967 ===
1967 Madras Legislative Assembly election: Kalasapakkam
| Party | Candidate | Votes | % | ±% |
|---|---|---|---|---|
| INC | S. Murugaiyan | 32,697 | 51.37% | New |
| DMK | M. Sundarasan | 20,554 | 32.30% | New |
| Independent | K. R. K. Gounder | 10,393 | 16.33% | New |
| Margin of victory | | 12,143 | 19.08% | |
| Turnout | | 63,644 | 72.80% | |
| Registered electors | | 92,766 | | |
| INC win (new seat) | | | | |

=== 1952 ===
1952 Madras Legislative Assembly election: Kalasapakkam
| Party | Candidate | Votes | % | ±% |
|---|---|---|---|---|
| Independent | Nataraja Mudaliar | 16,184 | 54.09% | New |
| INC | Periasami Gounder | 12,460 | 41.64% | New |
| Independent | Adithyan | 1,276 | 4.26% | New |
| Margin of victory | | 3,724 | 12.45% | |
| Turnout | | 29,920 | 45.71% | |
| Registered electors | | 65,462 | | |
| Independent win (new seat) | | | | |
