= P. S. Vijayakumar =

Member-Legislative Assembly, Tamil Nadu.
- In office 2006–2011
- Preceded by: Nalini Manokaran
- Succeeded by: L. Jaya Sudha
- Constituency: Polur

Personal details
- Born: 4 May 1954 Tiruvannamalai
- Party: Indian National Congress
- Profession: Advocate

P. S. Vijayakumar is an Indian politician and a former Member of the Legislative Assembly (MLA) of Tamil Nadu. He hails from the Polur region in the Tiruvannamalai district. Vijayakumar has completed M. A. degree at Annamalai University, Chidambaram and studied LLB at Bangalore in the year 2005. Representing the Indian National Congress party, he contested and won the 2006 Tamil Nadu Legislative Assembly election from the Polur Assembly constituency to become a member of the state assembly.

== Electoral Performance ==
=== 2006 ===
2006 Tamil Nadu Legislative Assembly election: Polur
Party	Candidate	Votes	%	±%
INC	P. S. Vijayakumar	58,595	47.08%	New
AIADMK	T. Vediyappan	51,051	41.02%	−10.3
DMDK	S. C. Purushothaman	6,867	5.52%	New
BJP	G. Elangeswaran	2,299	1.85%	New
Independent	M. B. Lakshmanan	2,089	1.68%	New
SP	G. Shanmugam	2,011	1.62%	New
Independent	M. Durairaj	815	0.65%	New
Independent	C. Sankar	729	0.59%	New
Margin of victory		7,544	6.06%	−3.23%
Turnout		124,456	71.53%	5.29%
Registered electors		173,999		
INC gain from AIADMK		Swing	-4.23%	
