= K. Pitchandi =

Indian politician

Deputy Speaker of Tamil Nadu Legislative Assembly
- In office 12 May 2021 – 5 May 2026
- Speaker: M. Appavu
- Chief Minister: MK Stalin
- Dy Chief Minister: Udhayanidhi Stalin
- Preceded by: Pollachi V. Jayaraman
- Succeeded by: M. Ravisankar

Minister for Housing and Urban Development, Government of Tamil Nadu
- In office 13 May 1996 – 13 May 2001
- Chief Minister: M. Karunanidhi

Member of the Tamil Nadu Legislative Assembly
- In office 19 May 2016 – 5 May 2026
- Preceded by: A. K. Aranganathan
- Succeeded by: S. Ramachandran
- Constituency: Kilpennathur
- In office 10 May 1996 – 14 May 2011
- Preceded by: V. Kannan
- Succeeded by: E. V. Velu
- Constituency: Tiruvannamalai
- In office 6 February 1989 – 30 January 1991
- Preceded by: A. S. Ravindran
- Succeeded by: V. Kannan
- Constituency: Tiruvannamalai

Personal details
- Born: Tiruvannamalai district, Tamil Nadu
- Party: Dravida Munnetra Kazhagam (1989 - Present)
- Relations: Mayilsamy (brother-in-law); Arumainayagam Mayilsamy alias Anbu (son-in-law)
- Occupation: Politician

K. Pitchandi, also known as K. Pichandi, is an Indian politician and the 14th & served as Deputy Speaker of Tamil Nadu Legislative Assembly from 2021 till 2026. A. K. Aranganathan only defeated K. Pitchandi in 2011 and 2026. Pitchandi continues to be the speaker. His record was broken in 2011 - 2016 and 2026-2031.

== Politics ==
Pitchandi was elected to the Tamil Nadu legislative assembly from Tiruvannamalai constituency as a Dravida Munnetra Kazhagam (DMK) candidate in the 1989, 1996, 2001 and 2006 elections. He also contested the constituency in the 1991 elections, when he finished as runner-up to V. Kannan of the Indian National Congress.

Pitchandi was the Minister for Housing and Urban Development in the Tamil Nadu Cabinet from 1996 to 2001. He stood as a candidate in 2011 in the Kilpennathur constituency, where he finished as runner-up to A. K. Aranganathan of the All India Anna Dravida Munnetra Kazhagam (AIADMK) party.

Pitchandi remained loyal to the DMK party, for which he was rewarded with the mostly honorific position of deputy whip in May 2016. He had won the Kilpennathur seat in the elections of 2021 to become MLA once again, after which he was made the Deputy Speaker of the Tamil Nadu Legislative Assembly.

Pitchandi was instrumental in persuading E. V. Velu to transfer his allegiance to the DMK from the AIADMK. Velu, who had already served twice as an AIADMK MLA, was elected to Pitchandi's former seat in Tiruvannamalai as a DMK member from 2011.

In 2021 he was the pro tem Speaker of the Tamil Nadu Legislative Assembly.

He stood as a candidate in 2026 in the Kilpennathur constituency, where he lost to S. Ramachandran of the All India Anna Dravida Munnetra Kazhagam (AIADMK) party.

== Personal life ==
On 13 September 2019, his daughter Aishwarya married Arumainayagam (alias Anbu), the son of late Tamil actor Mayilsamy.
