= K. Devaraji =

Indian politician

Member of the Tamil Nadu Legislative Assembly
- In office 12 May 2021 – 10 May 2026
- Preceded by: K.C. Veeramani
- Succeeded by: K.C. Veeramani
- Constituency: Jolarpet

Personal details
- Party: Dravida Munnetra Kazhagam

K. Devaraji is an Indian politician who is a Member of Legislative Assembly of Tamil Nadu. He was elected from Jolarpet as a Dravida Munnetra Kazhagam candidate in 2021.

== Electoral performance ==
2021 Tamil Nadu Legislative Assembly election: Jolarpet
Party	Candidate	Votes	%	±%
DMK	K. Devaraji	89,490	45.89%	+6.38
AIADMK	K. C. Veeramani	88,399	45.33%	−0.24
NTK	A. Siva	13,328	6.83%	New
NOTA	NOTA	1,337	0.69%	−0.13
Independent	R. Karunanidhi	1,067	0.55%	New
Margin of victory		1,091	0.56%	−5.51%
Turnout		195,021	81.46%	0.43%
Rejected ballots		255	0.13%	
Registered electors		239,415		
DMK gain from AIADMK		Swing	0.31%	
