= K. C. Veeramani =

Indian politician (born 1964)

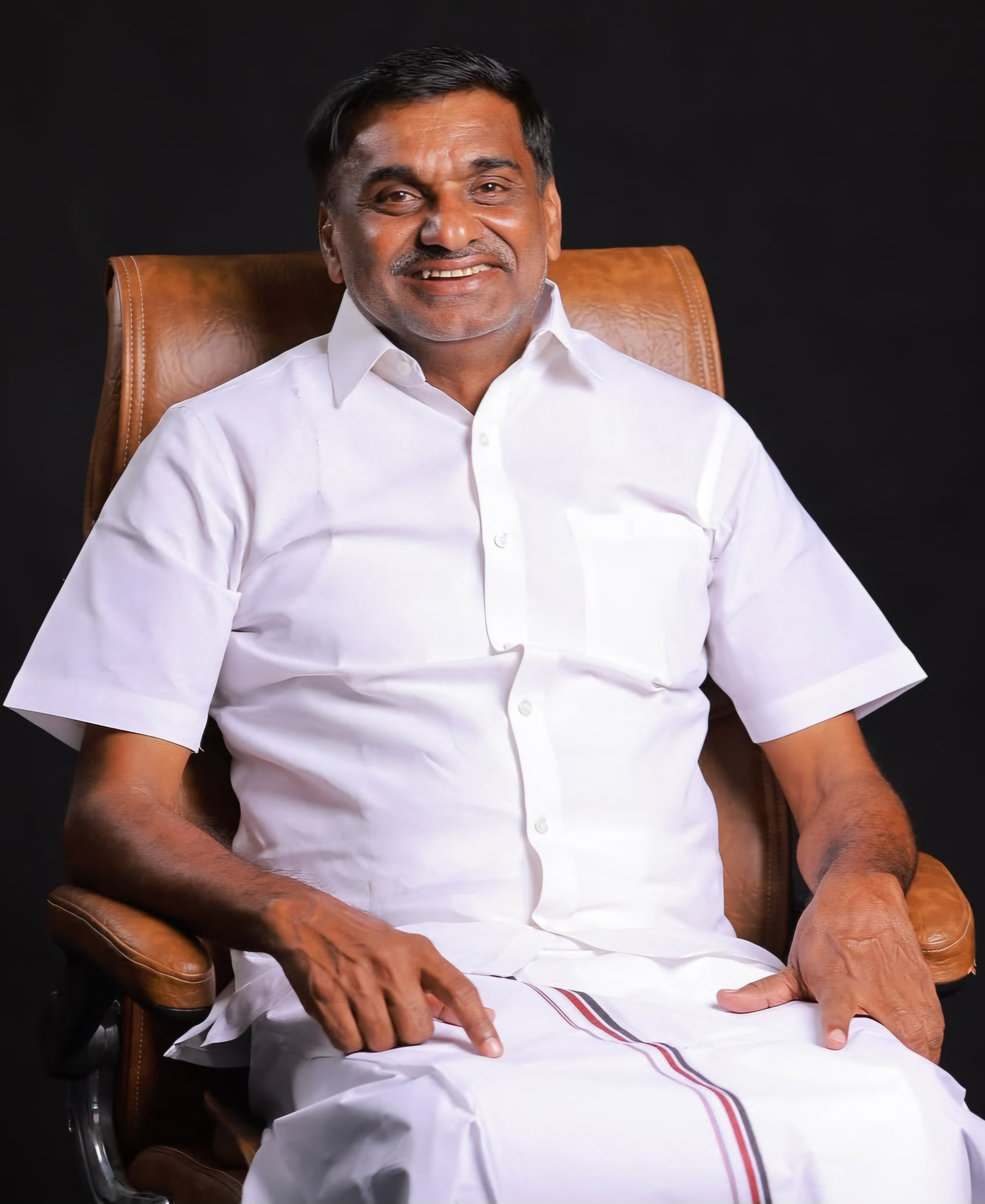
- K. C. Veeramani in 2024

Member of Tamil Nadu Legislative Assembly
- Incumbent
- Assumed office 11 May 2026
- Preceded by: K. Devaraji
- Constituency: Jolarpet
- In office 16 May 2011 – 4 May 2021
- Preceded by: Constituency Established
- Succeeded by: K. Devaraji
- Constituency: Jolarpet

Department of Commercial Taxes and Registration (Tamil Nadu)
- In office 2016 – 2 May 2021
- Succeeded by: P. Moorthy

Minister of School Education, Archaeology, Sports and Youth Welfare, Tamil Official Language and Tamil Culture
- In office 2013–2016
- Succeeded by: Edappadi K. Palaniswami

Department of Health and Family Welfare (Tamil Nadu)
- In office Feb 2013 – Oct 2013
- Succeeded by: C. Vijayabaskar

Personal details
- Born: 27 August 1964 (age 62) Edaiyampatti, Jolarpet, Tamil Nadu, India
- Party: All India Anna Dravida Munnetra Kazhagam
- Parent: Chinnaraji (father)

K. C. Veeramani (born 27 August 1964) is an Indian politician from Tamil Nadu, who served as several department Tamil nadu Cabinet Minister for Department of Commercial Taxes and Registration (Tamil Nadu), Department of School Education (Tamil Nadu), Tamil Nadu State Department of Archaeology, Department of Tamil Official Language and Tamil Culture of Tamil Nadu, Minister for Department of Health and Family Welfare (Tamil Nadu). He is the current Member of the Legislative Assembly from Jolarpet assembly constituency in Tirupattur district, Tamil Nadu. He is AIADMK District Secretary for Tirupattur district. He was elected as a representative of the All India Anna Dravida Munnetra Kazhagam party in 2011 and again in the elections of 2016. In 2021, he was defeated by around 1,000 votes. In 2026, he recontested and won from Jolarpet by a margin of 16,000 votes, with the runner-up being the Tamilaga Vettri Kazhagam candidate.

He was the Minister of Commercial Taxes and Registration Departments of Tamil Nadu. He is a former Minister For School Education and earlier served as the Health and Welfare minister for Tamil Nadu in 2011–16.
