= Annadurai C. N. =

Indian politician

Annadurai C N

Member of Parliament, Lok Sabha
- Incumbent
- Assumed office 23 May 2019
- Preceded by: R. Vanaroja
- Constituency: Tiruvannamalai

Personal details
- Born: 21 June 1973 (age 53) Devanampattu, Tiruvannamalai district, Tamil Nadu
- Party: Dravida Munnetra Kazhagam
- Spouse: Smt Deepa Annadurai
- Children: 1
- Education: Pachayappa's college

Annadurai C N is an Indian politician. He was elected to the Lok Sabha, the lower house of the Parliament of India, from Tiruvannamalai, Tamil Nadu, in the 2019 Indian general election as a member of the Dravida Munnetra Kazhagam.
