= Aarani Assembly constituency =

State Legislative Assembly Constituency in Tamil Nadu

Coordinates: 12.67°N 79.28°E

Arani
- Constituency No. 67 for the Tamil Nadu Legislative Assembly

Constituency details
- Country: India
- Region: South India
- State: Tamil Nadu
- District: Tiruvannamalai
- Lok Sabha constituency: Arani
- Established: 1951
- Total electors: 2,56,474
- Reservation: None

Member of Legislative Assembly
- 17th Tamil Nadu Legislative Assembly
- Incumbent L. Jaya Sudha
- Party: AIADMK
- Alliance: NDA
- Elected year: 2026

Arani is a state assembly constituency in Tiruvannamalai district of Tamil Nadu, India, which includes the city of Arni. Its State Assembly Constituency number is 67. Until and including the 2006 elections, the constituency was part of Vellore Lok Sabha constituency for national elections to the Parliament of India; thereafter, it has been part of Arani Lok Sabha constituency. It is one of the 234 State Legislative Assembly Constituencies in Tamil Nadu, in India.

== Members of the Legislative Assembly ==
Election	Member	Party
1952	V. K. Kannan	Commonweal Party
1957	P. Doraisamyu Reddiar	Independent politician
1962	C. K. Bhagavathar	Indian National Congress
1967	A. C. Narasimhan	Dravida Munnetra Kazhagam
1971	A. C. Narasimhan	Dravida Munnetra Kazhagam
1977	V. Arjunan	All India Anna Dravida Munnetra Kazhagam
1980	A. C. Shanmugam	All India Anna Dravida Munnetra Kazhagam
1984	M. Chinnakulandai	All India Anna Dravida Munnetra Kazhagam
1989	A. C. Dayalan	Dravida Munnetra Kazhagam
1991	I. R. Jaison Jacob	All India Anna Dravida Munnetra Kazhagam
1996	R. Sivanandam	Dravida Munnetra Kazhagam
2001	K. Ramachandran	All India Anna Dravida Munnetra Kazhagam
2006	R. Sivanandam	Dravida Munnetra Kazhagam
2011	R. M. Babu Murugavel	Desiya Murpokku Dravida Kazhagam
2016	Sevvoor S. Ramachandran	All India Anna Dravida Munnetra Kazhagam
2021	Sevvoor S. Ramachandran	All India Anna Dravida Munnetra Kazhagam
2026	L. Jaya Sudha	All India Anna Dravida Munnetra Kazhagam

Madras State

== Election results ==
Vote share of winning candidates
2026	33.34%
2021	46.86%
2016	44.89%
2011	50.06%
2006	49.40%
2001	50.98%
1996	51.29%
1991	58.51%
1989	36.21%
1984	54.83%
1980	50.65%
1977	41.47%
1971	60.50%
1967	56.26%
1962	51.60%
1957	51.59%
1952	48.14%

=== Assembly election 2026 ===
2026 Tamil Nadu Legislative Assembly election : Aarani
Party	Candidate	Votes	%	±%
AIADMK	L. Jaya Sudha	76,735	33.34	New
DMK	Mahalakshmi Govarthanan	71,104	30.89	▼14.54
TVK	Venkatesh Kumar. D	70,857	30.79	New
NTK	Dhavamani. R	6,888	2.99	▼1.78
NOTA	None of the above	707	0.31	▼0.46
Margin of victory		5,631	2.45	▲1.03
Turnout		231,139	90.12	▲9.72
Total valid votes		230,162		
Registered electors		256,474		▼7.65
AIADMK gain from AIADMK		Swing	▼13.52	

=== Assembly election 2021 ===
2021 Tamil Nadu Legislative Assembly election : Aarani
Party	Candidate	Votes	%	±%
AIADMK	Sevvoor S. Ramachandran	102,961	46.86	▲1.97
DMK	S. S. Anbalagan	99,833	45.43	▲4.03
NTK	D. Prakalatha	10,491	4.77	▲4.35
MNM	V. Manikandan	2,213	1.01	New
DMDK	G. Baskaran	1,861	0.85	▼2.50
NOTA	None of the above	1,690	0.77	▼0.06
Margin of victory		3,128	1.42	▼2.08
Turnout		223,285	80.40	▼1.45
Total valid votes		219,732		
Rejected ballots		466	0.21	▲0.08
Registered electors		277,727		▲8.35
AIADMK hold		Swing		

=== Assembly election 2016 ===
2016 Tamil Nadu Legislative Assembly election : Aarani
Party	Candidate	Votes	%	±%
AIADMK	Sevvoor S. Ramachandran	94,074	44.89	New
DMK	S. Babu	86,747	41.40	▼4.18
PMK	S. Rajasekar	12,877	6.15	New
DMDK	R. M. Babu Murugavel	7,025	3.35	▼46.71
NOTA	None of the above	1,749	0.83	New
BJP	P. Gopi	1,304	0.62	▼0.30
Margin of victory		7,327	3.50	▼0.98
Turnout		209,811	81.85	▼1.80
Total valid votes		209,545		
Rejected ballots		266	0.13	▲0.13
Registered electors		256,327		▲18.78
AIADMK gain from DMDK		Swing	▼5.17	

=== Assembly election 2011 ===
2011 Tamil Nadu Legislative Assembly election : Aarani
Party	Candidate	Votes	%	±%
DMDK	R. M. Babu Murugavel	88,967	50.06	▲45.60
DMK	R. Sivanandam	81,001	45.58	▼3.82
BJP	P. Gopi	1,639	0.92	▼0.09
BSP	A. Ganesan	1,459	0.82	New
Independent	K. Murugavel	1,327	0.75	
Margin of victory		7,966	4.48	▼4.24
Turnout		180,512	83.65	▲7.09
Total valid votes		177,723		
Registered electors		215,794		▲17.07
DMDK gain from DMK		Swing	▲0.66	

=== Assembly election 2006 ===
2006 Tamil Nadu Legislative Assembly election : Aarani
Party	Candidate	Votes	%	±%
DMK	R. Sivanandam	69,722	49.40	New
AIADMK	A. Santhanam	57,420	40.68	New
DMDK	D. Ramesh	6,292	4.46	New
PNK	E. Gangadharan	3,877	2.75	▼37.87
Independent	R. Nallathambi	1,547	1.10	
BJP	K. Narayanan	1,427	1.01	New
Independent	D. Thirugnanam	849	0.60	
Margin of victory		12,302	8.72	▼1.63
Turnout		141,135	76.56	▲7.49
Total valid votes		141,134		
Registered electors		184,336		▼2.35
DMK gain from AIADMK		Swing	▼1.58	

=== Assembly election 2001 ===
2001 Tamil Nadu Legislative Assembly election : Aarani
Party	Candidate	Votes	%	±%
AIADMK	K. Ramachandran	66,371	50.98	▲14.49
PNK	A. C. Shanmugam	52,889	40.62	New
Independent	P. Rajendiran	4,639	3.56	
MDMK	D. Raja	4,540	3.49	▼0.05
Independent	A. C. R. Umapathy	1,762	1.35	
Margin of victory		13,482	10.35	▼4.45
Turnout		130,386	69.07	▼5.99
Total valid votes		130,201		
Rejected ballots		185	0.14	▼4.21
Registered electors		188,770		▲10.49
AIADMK gain from DMK		Swing	▼0.31	

=== Assembly election 1996 ===
1996 Tamil Nadu Legislative Assembly election : Aarani
Party	Candidate	Votes	%	±%
DMK	R. Sivanandam	63,014	51.29	▲23.03
AIADMK	M. Chinnakulandai	44,835	36.49	New
PMK	V. Subbiramani	8,477	6.90	▼3.60
MDMK	D. Dhakshinamoorthy	4,344	3.54	New
Margin of victory		18,179	14.80	▼15.46
Turnout		128,241	75.06	▲1.98
Total valid votes		122,867		
Rejected ballots		5,584	4.35	▲0.66
Registered electors		170,847		▲6.04
DMK gain from AIADMK		Swing	▼7.22	

=== Assembly election 1991 ===
1991 Tamil Nadu Legislative Assembly election : Aarani
Party	Candidate	Votes	%	±%
AIADMK	I. R. Jaison Jacob	66,355	58.51	New
DMK	E. Selvarasu	32,043	28.26	▼7.95
PMK	M. Gounder Moorthi	11,902	10.50	New
AAP	M. Kandasamy	2,202	1.94	New
Margin of victory		34,312	30.26	▲23.06
Turnout		117,747	73.08	▼3.72
Total valid votes		113,405		
Rejected ballots		4,342	3.69	▲0.86
Registered electors		161,120		▲12.90
AIADMK gain from DMK		Swing	▲22.30	

=== Assembly election 1989 ===
1989 Tamil Nadu Legislative Assembly election : Aarani
Party	Candidate	Votes	%	±%
DMK	A. C. Dayalan	38,558	36.21	▼7.55
AIADMK	D. Karunakaran	30,891	29.01	New
AIADMK	A. C. Shanmugam	21,827	20.50	New
INC	A. Loganathan	12,793	12.01	New
Margin of victory		7,667	7.20	▼3.87
Turnout		109,596	76.80	▼4.58
Total valid votes		106,498		
Rejected ballots		3,098	2.83	▼0.54
Registered electors		142,709		▲12.58
DMK gain from AIADMK		Swing	▼18.62	

=== Assembly election 1984 ===
1984 Tamil Nadu Legislative Assembly election : Aarani
Party	Candidate	Votes	%	±%
AIADMK	M. Chinnakulandai	54,653	54.83	▲4.18
DMK	R. Sivanandam	43,620	43.76	▼0.93
Independent	K. Ramachandran	907	0.91	
Margin of victory		11,033	11.07	▲5.11
Turnout		103,158	81.38	▲7.89
Total valid votes		99,678		
Rejected ballots		3,480	3.37	▲1.48
Registered electors		126,766		▲7.83
AIADMK hold		Swing		

=== Assembly election 1980 ===
1980 Tamil Nadu Legislative Assembly election : Aarani
Party	Candidate	Votes	%	±%
AIADMK	A. C. Shanmugam	42,928	50.65	New
DMK	E. Selvarasu	37,877	44.69	▲14.49
JP	G. Ethiraju	3,956	4.67	New
Margin of victory		5,051	5.96	▼5.31
Turnout		86,392	73.49	▼0.80
Total valid votes		84,761		
Rejected ballots		1,631	1.89	▲0.21
Registered electors		117,556		▲4.97
AIADMK gain from AIADMK		Swing	▲9.18	

=== Assembly election 1977 ===
1977 Tamil Nadu Legislative Assembly election : Aarani
Party	Candidate	Votes	%	±%
AIADMK	V. Arjunan	33,925	41.47	New
DMK	E. Selvarasu	24,703	30.20	▼30.30
JP	M. Thellur Dharumarasan	19,448	23.78	New
INC	R. Shanmugam	2,831	3.46	New
Independent	M. A. Khader	892	1.09	
Margin of victory		9,222	11.27	▼9.74
Turnout		83,198	74.29	▼1.42
Total valid votes		81,799		
Rejected ballots		1,399	1.68	▲1.68
Registered electors		111,994		▲31.56
AIADMK gain from DMK		Swing	▼19.03	

=== Assembly election 1971 ===
1971 Tamil Nadu Legislative Assembly election : Aarani
Party	Candidate	Votes	%	±%
DMK	A. C. Narasimhan	37,682	60.50	▲4.24
INC	M. Darumarajan	24,599	39.50	New
Margin of victory		13,083	21.01	▼9.63
Turnout		64,446	75.71	▼3.26
Total valid votes		62,281		
Registered electors		85,126		▼3.80
DMK hold		Swing		

=== Assembly election 1967 ===
1967 Madras State Legislative Assembly election : Aarani
Party	Candidate	Votes	%	±%
DMK	A. C. Narasimhan	38,038	56.26	▲17.60
INC	T. B. J. Chettiar	17,320	25.62	▼25.98
Independent	M. Muniswamy	5,880	8.70	
Independent	K. P. K. Naicker	1,383	2.05	
Margin of victory		20,718	30.64	▲17.70
Turnout		69,879	78.97	▲0.51
Total valid votes		67,613		
Registered electors		88,490		▲11.55
DMK gain from INC		Swing	▲4.66	

=== Assembly election 1962 ===
1962 Madras State Legislative Assembly election : Aarani
Party	Candidate	Votes	%	±%
INC	C. Kothandarama Bhagavathar	30,773	51.60	▲3.19
DMK	A. C. Narasimhan	23,055	38.66	New
TNP	M. Darumarajan	5,805	9.73	New
Margin of victory		7,718	12.94	▲9.76
Turnout		62,240	78.46	▲26.86
Total valid votes		59,633		
Registered electors		79,330		▲4.36
INC gain from Independent		Swing	▲0.01	

=== Assembly election 1957 ===
1957 Madras State Legislative Assembly election : Aarani
Party	Candidate	Votes	%	±%
Independent	P. Doraisamyu Reddiar	20,237	51.59	
INC	V. K. Kannan	18,989	48.41	▲20.41
Margin of victory		1,248	3.18	▼16.96
Turnout		39,226	51.60	▼9.78
Total valid votes		39,226		
Registered electors		76,019		▲26.46
Independent gain from Commonweal Party		Swing	▲3.45	

=== Assembly election 1952 ===
1952 Madras State Legislative Assembly election : Aarani
Party	Candidate	Votes	%	±%
Commonweal Party	V. K. Kannan	17,761	48.14	New
INC	W. S. Sreenivasa Rao	10,329	28.00	New
Independent	S. A. Meenakshisundara Mudaliaer	6,559	17.78	New
CPI	T. K. Shanmugam	2,246	6.09	New
Margin of victory		7,432	20.14	
Turnout		36,895	61.38	
Total valid votes		36,895		
Registered electors		60,113		
Commonweal Party win (new seat)				
