= S. M. Annamalai =

Member of the Legislative Assembly. Tamil Nadu
- In office 1957–1962
- Preceded by: Manickavelu Naicker
- Succeeded by: Kesava Reddiar
- Constituency: Polur

Personal details
- Born: 1 July 1921
- Party: DMK
- Profession: Farmer

S. M. Annamalai (born 1 July 1921) was an Indian politician who was a member of the Tamil Nadu Legislative Assembly. He was from Kadambur village in Tiruvannamalai district. He studied at Tiruvannamalai Municipal High School and Vellore High School. A member of the Dravida Munnetra Kazhagam party, he contested and won the 1957 Tamil Nadu Legislative Assembly election from the Polur Assembly constituency, becoming a Member of the Legislative Assembly.

== Electoral performance ==
=== 1957 ===
1957 Madras Legislative Assembly election: Polur
Party	Candidate	Votes	%	±%
Independent	S. M. Annamalai	17,222	42.96%	New
Independent	T. B. Kesava Reddiar	10,616	26.48%	New
INC	V. Krishnakanthan	7,613	18.99%	−26.36
Independent	Vediappa Mudaliar	4,059	10.13%	New
Independent	Purushothama Mudali	578	1.44%	New
Margin of victory		6,606	16.48%	7.18%
Turnout		40,088	48.88%	−5.51%
Registered electors		82,019		
Independent gain from Commonweal Party		Swing	-11.69%	
