= Kilpennathur Assembly constituency =

State Legislative Assembly Constituency in Tamil Nadu

Coordinates: 12.24°N 79.23°E

Kilpennathur
- Constituency No. 64 for the Tamil Nadu Legislative Assembly

Constituency details
- Country: India
- Region: South India
- State: Tamil Nadu
- District: Tiruvannamalai
- Lok Sabha constituency: Tiruvannamalai
- Established: 2008
- Total electors: 2,41,209

Member of Legislative Assembly
- 17th Tamil Nadu Legislative Assembly
- Incumbent S. Ramachandran
- Party: AIADMK
- Alliance: NDA
- Elected year: 2026

Kilpennathur is a state assembly constituency in Tamil Nadu, India, that was formed after constituency delimitations in 2008. Its State Assembly Constituency number is 64. It comprises a portion of Tiruvannamalai taluk and is included in the similarly named parliamentary constituency for national elections. It is one of the 234 State Legislative Assembly Constituencies in Tamil Nadu, in India.

== Members of the Legislative Assembly ==
Year	Member	Party
2011	A. K. Aranganathan	All India Anna Dravida Munnetra Kazhagam
2016	K. Pitchandi	Dravida Munnetra Kazhagam
2021	K. Pitchandi	Dravida Munnetra Kazhagam
2026	S. Ramachandran	All India Anna Dravida Munnetra Kazhagam

== Election results ==
Vote share of winning candidates
2026	41.17%
2021	51.34%
2016	50.22%
2011	48.20%

=== 2026 ===
2026 Tamil Nadu Legislative Assembly election: Kilpennathur
Party	Candidate	Votes	%	±%
AIADMK	Ramachandran. S	90,503	41.18	New
DMK	Pitchandi. K	60,038	27.32	▼24.02
TVK	Raja. D	59,130	26.90	New
NTK	Loganathan. V	6,184	2.81	▼2.85
Independent	Pichandi. R	604	0.27	New
Independent	Pichandi. D	533	0.24	New
NOTA	NOTA	440	0.20	
Margin of victory		30,465	13.86	▲0.72
Turnout		2,19,790	91.12	▲10.57
Registered electors		2,41,209		▼11,892
AIADMK gain from DMK		Swing	New	

=== 2021 ===
2021 Tamil Nadu Legislative Assembly election: Kilpennathur
Party	Candidate	Votes	%	±%
DMK	K. Pitchandi	104,675	51.34%	+1.12
PMK	K. Selvakumar	77,888	38.20%	+27.69
NTK	Dr. R. Ramesh Babu	11,541	5.66%	New
AMMK	P. Karthikeyan	2,191	1.07%	New
MNM	V. Suganantham	1,437	0.70%	New
Margin of victory		26,787	13.14%	−4.43%
Turnout		203,884	80.55%	−3.90%
Rejected ballots		252	0.12%	
Registered electors		253,101		
DMK hold		Swing	1.12%	

=== 2016 ===
2016 Tamil Nadu Legislative Assembly election: Kilpennathur
Party	Candidate	Votes	%	±%
DMK	K. Pitchandi	99,070	50.22%	+4.37
AIADMK	K. Selvamani	64,404	32.64%	−15.55
PMK	G. Ediroli Manian	20,737	10.51%	New
CPI	K. Jothi	4,613	2.34%	New
BSP	S. Devendiran	1,273	0.65%	−0.05
BJP	M. Subbarayan	1,209	0.61%	−0.43
NOTA	NOTA	1,164	0.59%	New
Margin of victory		34,666	17.57%	15.22%
Turnout		197,287	84.45%	−0.02%
Registered electors		233,605		
DMK gain from AIADMK		Swing	2.02%	

=== 2011 ===
2011 Tamil Nadu Legislative Assembly election: Kilpennathur
Party	Candidate	Votes	%	±%
AIADMK	A. K. Aranganathan	83,663	48.20%	New
DMK	K. Pitchandi	79,582	45.85%	New
Independent	D. Sridharan	2,301	1.33%	New
BJP	D. Pitchandi	1,811	1.04%	New
Independent	R. Settu	1,724	0.99%	New
BSP	A. Isaac Newton	1,203	0.69%	New
Independent	M. Murugan	1,057	0.61%	New
Margin of victory		4,081	2.35%	
Turnout		173,576	84.47%	
Registered electors		205,491		
AIADMK win (new seat)				
