= Jolarpet Assembly constituency =

State Legislative Assembly Constituency in Tamil Nadu

Coordinates: 12.6387567°N 78.5002115°E

Jolarpet
- Constituency No. 49 for the Tamil Nadu Legislative Assembly

Constituency details
- Country: India
- Region: South India
- State: Tamil Nadu
- District: Tirupathur
- Lok Sabha constituency: Tiruvannamalai
- Established: 2008
- Total electors: 2,37,465
- Reservation: None

Member of Legislative Assembly
- 17th Tamil Nadu Legislative Assembly
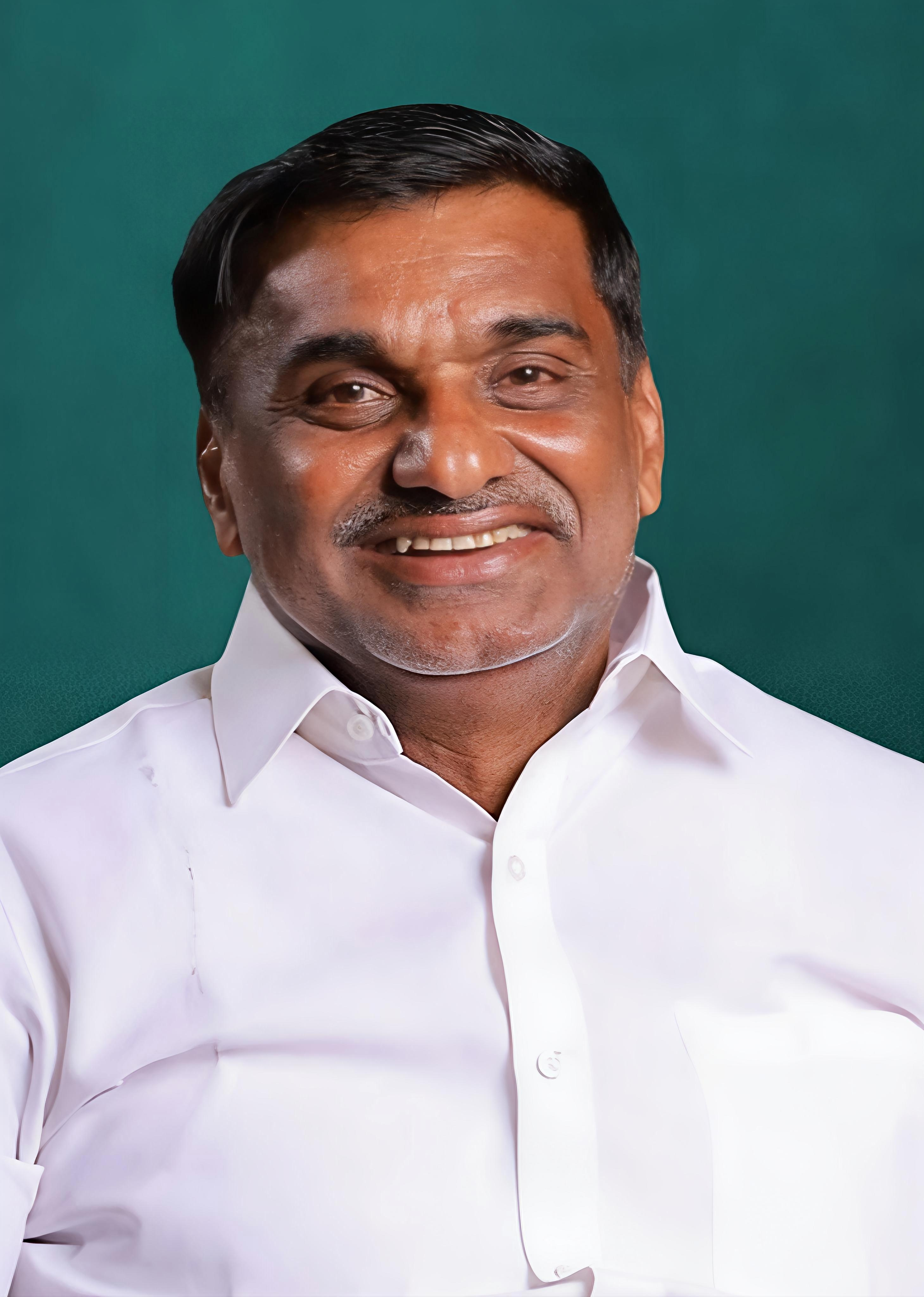
- Incumbent K. C. Veeramani
- Party: AIADMK
- Alliance: NDA
- Elected year: 2026

Jolarpet is a state assembly constituency in Tamil Nadu, India, formed after constituency delimitations in 2008. Its State Assembly Constituency number is 49. It comprises portions of Natrampalli taluk, Vaniyambadi and Tirupattur taluks and is a part of Tiruvannamalai Lok Sabha constituency for national elections. It is one of the 234 State Legislative Assembly Constituencies in Tamil Nadu in India. After newly formed constituency, first election held on 2011 Tamil Nadu Legislative Assembly election and Jolarpet Assembly constituency 's first MLA is K.C. Veeramani from AIADMK and Of the four elections held since this constituency's formation (2011, 2016, 2021, and 2026), K.C. Veeramani has emerged victorious in three.

== Members of Legislative Assembly ==
| Year | Winner | Party |
|---|---|---|
| 2011 | K. C. Veeramani | All India Anna Dravida Munnetra Kazhagam |
| 2016 | K. C. Veeramani | All India Anna Dravida Munnetra Kazhagam |
| 2021 | K. Devaraji | Dravida Munnetra Kazhagam |
| 2026 | K. C. Veeramani | All India Anna Dravida Munnetra Kazhagam |

== Election results ==
Vote share of winning candidates
| 2026 | 36.91% |
| 2021 | 45.89% |
| 2016 | 45.57% |
| 2011 | 55.13% |

=== 2026 ===
2026 Tamil Nadu Legislative Assembly election: Jolarpet
| Party | Candidate | Votes | % | ±% |
|---|---|---|---|---|
| AIADMK | K. C. Veeramani | 78,633 | 36.91 | ▼8.42 |
| TVK | C. Munisamy | 62,550 | 29.36 | New |
| DMK | Kavitha Dhandapani | 61,977 | 29.09 | ▼16.80 |
| NTK | K. Sasirekha | 5,974 | 2.80 | ▼4.03 |
| NOTA | NOTA | 695 | 0.33 | ▼0.36 |
| Margin of victory | | 16,083 | 7.55 | ▲6.99 |
| Turnout | | 2,12,480 | 89.48 | ▲8.02 |
| Registered electors | | 2,37,465 | | ▼1,950 |
| AIADMK gain from DMK | | Swing | ▼8.42 | |

=== 2021 ===
2021 Tamil Nadu Legislative Assembly election: Jolarpet
| Party | Candidate | Votes | % | ±% |
|---|---|---|---|---|
| DMK | K. Devaraji | 89,490 | 45.89% | +6.38 |
| AIADMK | K. C. Veeramani | 88,399 | 45.33% | −0.24 |
| NTK | A. Siva | 13,328 | 6.83% | New |
| NOTA | NOTA | 1,337 | 0.69% | −0.13 |
| Independent | R. Karunanidhi | 1,067 | 0.55% | New |
| Margin of victory | | 1,091 | 0.56% | −5.51% |
| Turnout | | 195,021 | 81.46% | 0.43% |
| Rejected ballots | | 255 | 0.13% | |
| Registered electors | | 239,415 | | |
| DMK gain from AIADMK | | Swing | 0.31% | |

=== 2016 ===
2016 Tamil Nadu Legislative Assembly election: Jolarpet
| Party | Candidate | Votes | % | ±% |
|---|---|---|---|---|
| AIADMK | K. C. Veeramani | 82,525 | 45.57% | −9.55 |
| DMK | C. Kavitha | 71,534 | 39.50% | New |
| PMK | G. Ponnusamy | 17,516 | 9.67% | −30.8 |
| DMDK | A. Fayaz Basha | 3,509 | 1.94% | New |
| NOTA | NOTA | 1,483 | 0.82% | New |
| VBMP | A. Thirumalai | 1,224 | 0.68% | New |
| BJP | N. Oveyam Ranjan | 1,021 | 0.56% | New |
| Margin of victory | | 10,991 | 6.07% | −8.59% |
| Turnout | | 181,084 | 81.03% | −0.62% |
| Registered electors | | 223,488 | | |
| AIADMK hold | | Swing | -9.55% | |

=== 2011 ===
2011 Tamil Nadu Legislative Assembly election: Jolarpet
| Party | Candidate | Votes | % | ±% |
|---|---|---|---|---|
| AIADMK | K. C. Veeramani | 86,273 | 55.13% | New |
| PMK | G. Ponnusamy | 63,337 | 40.47% | New |
| Independent | M. Annamalai | 1,912 | 1.22% | New |
| Independent | M. S. Veeramani | 1,442 | 0.92% | New |
| BSP | M. Gandhibabu | 956 | 0.61% | New |
| Independent | G. M. Ponnuswamy | 889 | 0.57% | New |
| Independent | K. Paramasivam | 864 | 0.55% | New |
| Margin of victory | | 22,936 | 14.66% | |
| Turnout | | 156,501 | 81.64% | |
| Registered electors | | 191,688 | | |
| AIADMK win (new seat) | | | | |
