= Sevvoor S. Ramachandran =

Indian politician

Cabinet Minister Government of Tamil Nadu
- In office 16 May 2016 – 7 May 2021
- Minister: Minister of Hindu Religious and Charitable Endowments
- Chief Minister: J. Jayalalithaa; O. Panneerselvam; Edappadi K. Palaniswamy
- Succeeded by: P. K. Sekar Babu

Member of the Tamil Nadu Legislative Assembly
- In office 16 May 2016 – 6 May 2026
- Preceded by: R. M. Babu Murugavel
- Succeeded by: L. Jaya Sudha
- Constituency: Arani

Personal details
- Born: 3 June 1973 (age 53) Sevvoor, Tiruvannamalai, Tamil Nadu
- Citizenship: Indian
- Party: All India Anna Dravida Munnetra Kazhagam
- Parent: P. M. Somasundharam Mudaliar (father)
- Occupation: Politician, farmer

Sevvoor Somasundharam Ramachandran is an Indian politician and a member of the 15th Tamil Nadu Legislative Assembly. He was elected from Arni constituency, Thiruvannamalai as a candidate of the AIADMK. He served as the Minister for Hindu Religious and Charitable Endowments in the 15th Tamil Nadu Assembly.

He belongs to the Sengunthar Kaikola Mudaliar (Kadambarayan Gothram) community.
