= R. Vanaroja =

Indian politician and Member of Parliament elected from Tamil Nadu

R Vanaroja

Member of Parliament, Lok Sabha
- In office 1 September 2014 – 23 May 2019
- Succeeded by: Annadurai C N
- Constituency: Tiruvannamalai

Personal details
- Born: 20 January 1959 (age 67) Vellore, Tamil Nadu
- Party: AIADMK
- Spouse: N Shanmugam
- Children: 2

R Vanaroja (b 1963) is an Indian politician and former Member of Parliament elected from Tamil Nadu. She was elected to the Lok Sabha from Tiruvannamalai constituency as an Anna Dravida Munnetra Kazhagam candidate in the 2014 general election.

She is a post graduate and Tiruvannamalai district (south) AIADMK Women's Wing secretary and native of Neepathurai village in Chengam taluk.

== Education qualifications ==
M.A., B.Ed. Educated at Annamalai University

== Positions held ==
May, 2014 Elected to 16th Lok Sabha 1 Sep. 2014 onwards Member, Committee on Empowerment of Women Member, Standing Committee on Information Technology Member, Consultative Committee, Ministry of Women and Child Development.
