= Agri S. S. Krishnamurthy =

Indian politician

Member of the Tamil Nadu Legislative Assembly
- Incumbent
- Assumed office 11 May 2026
- Preceded by: P. S. T. Saravanan
- Constituency: Kalasapakkam
- In office 12 May 2021 – 6 May 2026
- Preceded by: K. V. Sekaran
- Succeeded by: R. Abishek
- Constituency: Polur
- In office 11 May 2006 – 20 May 2016
- Preceded by: S. Ramachandran
- Succeeded by: V. Panneerselvam
- Constituency: Kalasapakkam

Minister for Agriculture Government of Tamil Nadu
- In office 19 May 2014 – March 2015

Minister of Food Government of Tamil Nadu
- In office 16 May 2011 – 2012

Personal details
- Born: 26 September 1959 (age 67) Elathur, Kalasapakkam, Tamil Nadu, India
- Party: All India Anna Dravida Munnetra Kazhagam
- Parent: S. Sundaresan (father)

Agri S. Sundaresan Krishnamurthy is an Indian politician and was a member of the 14th Tamil Nadu Legislative Assembly from Kalasapakkam constituency. As a representative of the Anna Dravida Munnetra Kazhagam, he was previously elected to the same constituency in the 2006 elections.

== Personal life ==
Born in an agricultural family of Thuluva Vellalar community of Elathur village in the present Kalasapakkam taluk of Tiruvannamalai district on 23 March 1959. Father S. Sundaresan and Mother Jagadambal. Married to Vijayakumari and is father of three children. He served as Chairman of Kalasapakkam Panchayat Union in the initial part of his career.

== Political career ==
He was elected as MLA from Kalasapakkam constituency at 2006 and was re-elected from Kalasapakkam constituency as a Member of Legislative Assembly in 2011 assembly election on an AIADMK ticket and was included in the Jayalalithaa ministry as Food minister. Later his portfolio was altered and he was given Commercial Taxes department. Again in a short period his portfolio was changed to Education and within a week from this change he was dropped from the cabinet. He is an agricultural graduate and thus earned the nickname 'Agri'.

Krishnamoorthy replaced S. Damodaran as Minister for Agriculture in the Government of Tamil Nadu on 19 May 2014, when Jayalalithaa reshuffled her government.
