= R. Sivanandam =

Indian politician

Member of the Tamil Nadu Legislative Assembly
- In office 2006–2011
- Constituency: Aarani
- In office 1996–2001

Personal details
- Party: Dravida Munnetra Kazhagam

R. Sivanandam is an Indian politician and incumbent Member of the Legislative Assembly of Tamil Nadu. He was elected to the Tamil Nadu legislative assembly from Arni constituency as a Dravida Munnetra Kazhagam candidate in 1996 and 2006 elections.

== Electoral performance ==
Election	Constituency	Political party	Result	Vote %	Opposition			Ref
Election	Constituency	Political party	Result	Vote %	Candidate	Political party	Vote %	Ref
1984	Aarani	DMK	Lost	43.76%	M. Chinnakulandai	AIADMK	54.83%	
1996	Aarani	DMK	Won	51.29%	M. Chinnakulandai	AIADMK	36.49%	
2006	Aarani	DMK	Won	49.40%	A. Santhanam	AIADMK	40.68%	
2011	Aarani	DMK	Lost	45.58%	R. M. Babu Murugavel	DMDK	50.06%	
