= S. Murugaiyan =

Indian politician

Member of the Tamil Nadu Legislative Assembly
- In office 1967 - 1972; 1971 - 1976
- Preceded by: M. Sundraswamy
- Constituency: Kalasapakkam

Personal details
- Political party: Dravida Munnetra Kazhagam

S. Murugaiyan (7 August 1920 - 6 January 2003) was an Indian politician, former Member of parliament, Lok Sabha and former Member of the Legislative Assembly of Tamil Nadu. He was elected to the Tamil Nadu legislative assembly from Thurinjapuram constituency in 1962 and from Kalasapakkam constituency as a Dravida Munnetra Kazhagam candidate in the 1967 and 1971 elections. He was also elected as Member of Parliament from Tirupattur constituency in 1980 lok sabha election. He then served as Municipal Chairman of Tiruvannamalai and leader of Tiruvannamalai Sengunthar Mahajana sangam.

In Tiruvannamalai an educational institution was named as S. Murugaiyan memorial model high school.

== Electoral performance ==
1971 Tamil Nadu Legislative Assembly election: Kalasapakkam
| Party | Candidate | Votes | % | ±% |
|---|---|---|---|---|
| DMK | S. Murugaiyan | 42,893 | 58.88% | +26.58 |
| INC | M. Sundraswamy | 29,960 | 41.12% | −10.25 |
| Margin of victory | | 12,933 | 17.75% | −1.33% |
| Turnout | | 72,853 | 77.32% | 4.52% |
| Registered electors | | 96,470 | | |
| DMK gain from INC | | Swing | 7.50% | |

1967 Madras Legislative Assembly election: Kalasapakkam
| Party | Candidate | Votes | % | ±% |
|---|---|---|---|---|
| INC | S. Murugaiyan | 32,697 | 51.37% | New |
| DMK | M. Sundarasan | 20,554 | 32.30% | New |
| Independent | K. R. K. Gounder | 10,393 | 16.33% | New |
| Margin of victory | | 12,143 | 19.08% | |
| Turnout | | 63,644 | 72.80% | |
| Registered electors | | 92,766 | | |
| INC win (new seat) | | | | |
