= Peranamallur =

- Township
- Location in Tamil Nadu, India
- Coordinates: 12.5699°N 79.4338°E
- Country: India
- State: Tamil Nadu
- District: Tiruvanamalai
- Elevation: 145.87 m (478.6 ft)

Population (2011)
  - Total: 5,801

Languages
  - Official: Tamil
- Time zone: UTC+5:30 (IST)
- PIN: 604 503

Peranamallur is a panchayat town in Tiruvannamalai district in the Indian state of Tamil Nadu.

== Geography ==
Peranamallur is located with the coordinates of (12.5699°N 79.4338°E). It has an average elevation of 145.87 m above the mean sea level.

== History ==
Since war happened between two groups of soldiers at this place, this town got name as "pe-ra-ni-mallur" then it became "pe-ra-ni-nallur" and now it called as " per-na-mallur". Some believe is there like because of a dam build across the panai-yaar, this name came. This is one of important place of pallava and early cholas on Thondaimandalam. The chola kings used to stay here for rest while they travel to pazhaiyaar, So this became the head for all around the villages. It is mainly dominated and administrated by Samburayar kings like vallavaraiyar headed Thiruvannamalai.

== Demographics ==
The Peranamallur Town Panchayat is divided into 12 wards for which elections are held every 5 years. The Peranamallur Town Panchayat has population of 5,801 of which 2,878 are males while 2,923 are females as per report released by Census India 2011.

The population of children aged 0-6 is 569 which is 9.81% of total population of Peranamallur (TP). In Peranamallur Town Panchayat, the female sex ratio is 1016 against state average of 996. Moreover, the child sex ratio in Peranamallur is around 903 compared to Tamil Nadu state average of 943. literacy rate of Peranamallur city is 76.85% lower than state average of 80.09%. In Peranamallur, male literacy is around 87.32% while the female literacy rate is 66.68%.

Peranamallur Town Panchayat has total administration over 1,450 houses to which it supplies basic amenities like water and sewerage. It is also authorize to build roads within Town Panchayat limits and impose taxes on properties coming under its jurisdiction..

The Pernamallur block is a revenue block in the Thiruvannamalai district of Tamil Nadu, India. It has a total of 57 panchayat villages.

This Town and near by villages have Vanniyars (Vanniya Goundars) dominantly and Scheduled Caste peoples. Other than these, Mudaliyaar. Chettiyar, Brahmin, Kammalar, and other Hindu religion peoples also living along with Jain, Muslims and Christians peoples.

== Politics ==
Pernamallur was an assembly constituency Since 1957.

=== Madras State ===
Year	Winner	Party
1957	K. Periyannan and Krishnasami	Indian National Congress
1962	P. Ramachandra	Indian National Congress
1967	V.D.annamalai	Dravida Munnetra Kazhagam

=== Tamil Nadu ===
Year	Winner	Party
1971	P. Ettiappan	Dravida Munnetra Kazhagam
1977	P. Chandran	Anna Dravida Munnetra Kazhagam
1980	P. M. Venkatesan	Anna Dravida Munnetra Kazhagam
1984	R. Hari Kumar (politician)	Anna Dravida Munnetra Kazhagam
1989	R. Ettiyappan	Dravida Munnetra Kazhagam
1989	M. Chinna Kuzhandhao	Anna Dravida Munnetra Kazhagam
1991	A. K. Srinivasan	Anna Dravida Munnetra Kazhagam
1996	N. Pandurangan	Dravida Munnetra Kazhagam
2001	A. K. S. Anbalagan	Anna Dravida Munnetra Kazhagam
2006	G. Edirolimanian	Pattali Makkal Katchi

Due to reformation of assembly constituencies in Tamil Nadu, pernamallur Assembly dissolved and merged in Vandavasi and Polur due to 2008 assembly delimitation.

Now Pernamallur town became part of Vandavasi Assembly and in Arani (Lok Sabha constituency).

Notable Benchmark:

AIADMK chief J.Jayalalitha secured victories in 1991 and became CM of Tamil Nadu for the first time. But Specially Peranamallur voters given Miss Jayalalitha a victorious support for her re-entry even before to the assembly elections 1991. Her candidate Mr.Chinnakozhandhi won in 1989 by-election conducted for Peranamallur Assembly among with 3 other assembly constituencies.

== Places of interest ==
Valarkiri velmurugan temple (built on the side of pernamallur big lake and on the big rock (Valarkiri), from where one can see the nature view of lake and (an oval-shaped rock standing on another sliding rock)

Thiru-karai-yeswarar temple – The great Shiva devotee Kocengannan built this temple and hence this temple tank called as kochengannan therrtham. Once upon a time, there was a river called paniyaar flew in this area. Panaiyaar is got the name since plenty of panai trees there on the banks of this river. The chola king Kocengannan built this temple on the banks of the panai yaar. Other than this, this town has more ancient temples for Perumal, Anjaneya, Ettiyamman and also for Jain. more info, https://temple.dinamalar.com/new.php?id=1170

Famous and ancient temples for Lord Shiva and Lord Perumal are there in around villages.

Famous Shiva temple is there at Injimedu Village near Peranamallur.

Famous prasanna Vengadewsa perumal temple is there in (injimedu) near Peranamallur. https://temple.dinamalar.com/New.php?id=399

1000-year-old historical famous Samanar temples there in ponnur which is few km away and on the way to vandavasi.

Near by Avaniyapuram has a dam on the river which is part of cheyyar which built at British period.
