= K. V. Sekaran =

K. V. Sekaran is an Indian politician and a member of the Tamil Nadu Legislative Assembly. He was elected to the Tamil Nadu Legislative Assembly in the 2016 elections as a candidate of the Dravida Munnetra Kazhagam (DMK) from the Polur Assembly constituency.

== Electoral Performance ==
=== 2016 ===
2016 Tamil Nadu Legislative Assembly election: Polur
Party	Candidate	Votes	%	±%
DMK	K. V. Sekaran	66,588	34.02%	New
AIADMK	M. Murugan	58,315	29.80%	−25.63
Independent	C. Elumalai	38,861	19.86%	New
PMK	A. Velayutham	17,184	8.78%	−29.52
CPI(M)	P. Selvan	5,000	2.55%	New
Independent	A. Dhashanamoorthy	1,858	0.95%	New
BJP	D. Tamilarasi	1,232	0.63%	−0.19
NOTA	NOTA	1,230	0.63%	New
Margin of victory		8,273	4.23%	−12.90%
Turnout		195,714	85.86%	1.02%
Registered electors		227,936		
DMK gain from AIADMK		Swing	-21.40%	
