= P. S. T. Saravanan =

Indian politician

Member of the Tamil Nadu Legislative Assembly
- In office 12 May 2021 – 4 May 2026
- Preceded by: V. Panneerselvam
- Succeeded by: V. Panneerselvam
- Constituency: Kalasapakkam

Personal details
- Party: Dravida Munnetra Kazhagam

P. S. T. Saravanan is an Indian politician who is a Member of Legislative Assembly of Tamil Nadu. He was elected from Kalasapakkam as a Dravida Munnetra Kazhagam candidate in 2021.

== Elections contested ==
Election	Constituency	Party	Result	Vote %	Runner-up	Runner-up Party	Runner-up vote %
2021 Tamil Nadu Legislative Assembly election	Kalasapakkam	DMK	Won	47.92%	V. Panneerselvam	AIADMK	43.23%
