= A. Rajendran =

Indian politician

- Occupation: politician

Annaswamy Rajendran is an Indian politician and former Member of the Legislative Assembly of Tamil Nadu. He was elected to the Tamil Nadu legislative assembly from Polur constituency as a Dravida Munnetra Kazhagam candidate in 1989 and 1996.

== Date of birth ==
Rajendran is a son of T.C. Annaswamy, an agriculrist of Tchambadi Village. He was twice elected to the Tamil Nadu legislative assembly from Polur constituency as a DMK candidate, once in 1989 and the next time in 1996.

Currently, he is the chairman of the Oxford College of Engineering which is located in the village of Karai Poondi, Polur Tauk, Tiruvannamalai District, Tamil Nadu, India.

== Social service ==
He plays an active role in various social organizations of the Tamil Jain community. He is a trustee of the Acharya Shri Akalanka Educational Trust which manages the Arihanthagiri Jain Math located at Tiruvannaamalai, Polur Taluk, Tiruvannamalai District, Tamil Nadu.
