= 2014 Indian general election in Tamil Nadu =

Elections in Tamil Nadu

- 24 April 2014

39 Seats
- Opinion polls
- Turnout: 73.74% (▲0.71%)
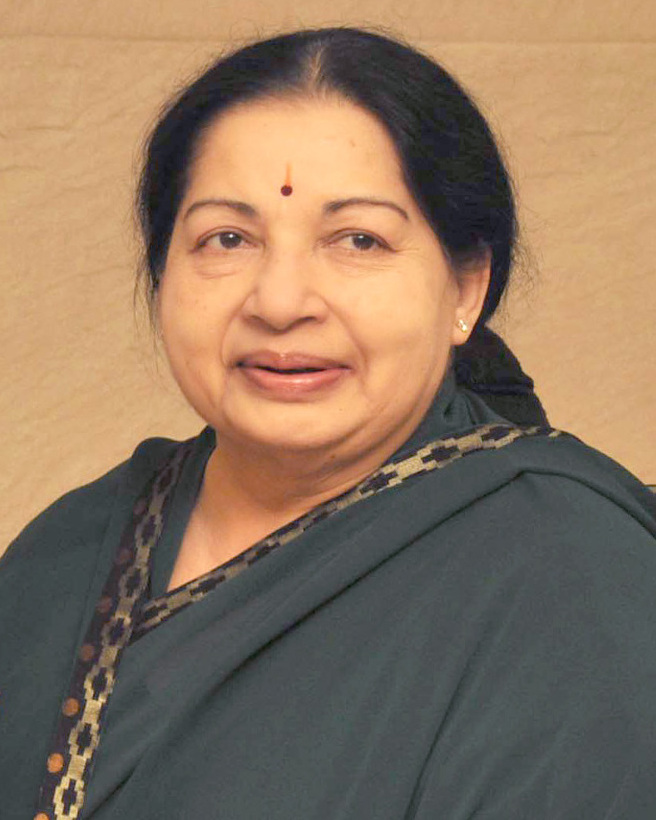

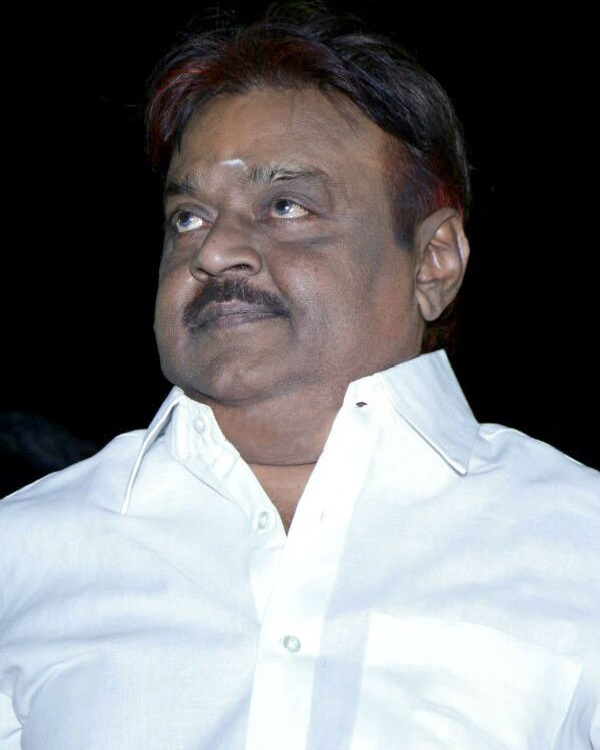
	First party	Second party
Leader	J. Jayalalithaa	Vijayakant
Party	AIADMK	DMDK
Alliance	AIADMK+	NDA
Leader since	1988	2005
Leader's seat	Did not contest	Did not contest
Seats before	9	0
Seats won	37	2
Seat change	▲28	▲2
Popular vote	17,978,922	7,524,756
Percentage	44.92%	18.80%
Swing	▲22.01%	▼3.01%
Prime Minister before election
Manmohan Singh
INC
Prime Minister after election
Narendra Modi
BJP

The 2014 Indian general elections for Tamil Nadu's 39 seats in the 16th Lok Sabha were held on 24 April 2014. The All India Anna Dravida Munnetra Kazhagam led by its general secretary J. Jayalalithaa won a spectacular victory, taking 37 of the 39 seats. The total electors in the state of Tamil Nadu for the election was 55,114,867 and 73.74% of voters exercised their right to do so. The results of the elections were declared on 16 May 2014.

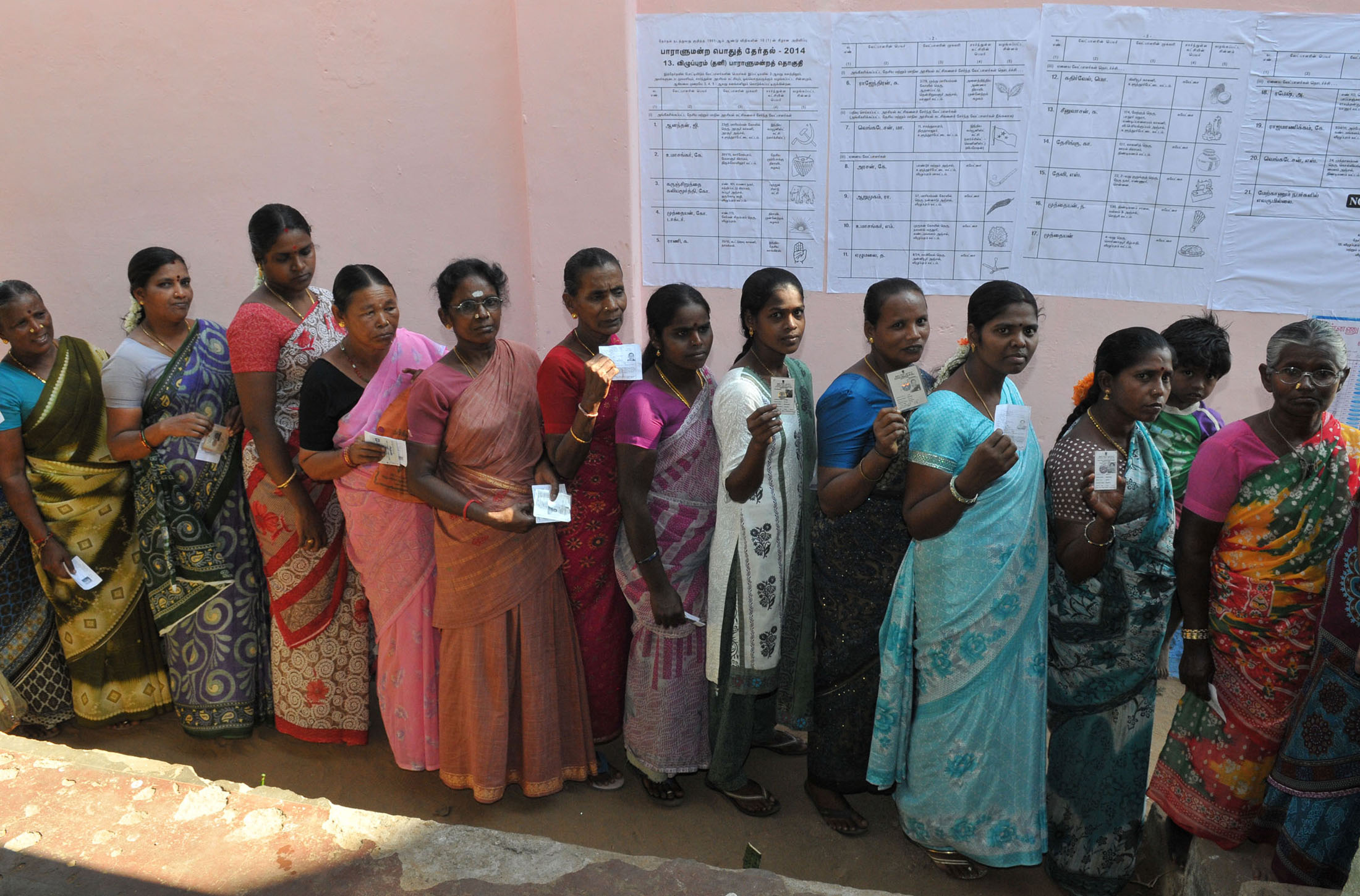
Women voters standing in a queue to cast their votes at a polling booth in Viluppuram for the Lok Sabha election on 24 April 2014

== Overview ==
The election process is carried out by the state election commission headed by Praveen Kumar, and for the first time, Section 144 of the CrPC was used in the election for 36 hours before polling to prevent cash distribution to bribe voters. As of 23 April 2014, the commission had seized ₹39 crore in the state.

== Schedule ==
Event	Date (Day)
Issue of Notification	29 March 2014 (Saturday)
Last date for filing Nominations	5 April 2014 (Saturday)
Scrutiny of Nominations	7 April 2014 (Monday)
Last date for withdrawal of candidature	9 April 2014 (Wednesday)
Date of poll	24 April 2014 (Thursday)
Counting of votes	16 May 2014 (Friday)
Date before which the election process shall be completed	28 May 2014 (Wednesday)

== Parties and alliances ==
All India Anna Dravida Munnetra Kazhagam (AIADMK)

In January 2014, All India Anna Dravida Munnetra Kazhagam's general secretary J. Jayalalithaa stated that she would campaign and win all 39 seats by allying with CPI and CPI(M). Members of the AIADMK party declared her the prime ministerial candidate, despite rumours that she might support Narendra Modi. On 24 February 2014, the date of her birthday, she announced candidates for all 39 Lok Sabha constituencies in Tamil Nadu.

National Democratic Alliance (NDA)

The Bharatiya Janata Party-led National Democratic Alliance, with Narendra Modi as prime ministerial candidate, formed an alliance with Desiya Murpokku Dravida Kazhagam (DMDK), Pattali Makkal Katchi (PMK), Marumalarchi Dravida Munnetra Kazhagam (MDMK), Indhiya Jananayaga Katchi (IJK), Kongunadu Makkal Desia Katchi (KMDK) and Puthiya Needhi Katchi (PNK). The seats were allotted on 20 March 2014 in Chennai by the national president of the Bharatiya Janata Party and the former chief minister of Uttar Pradesh Rajnath Singh.

Democratic Progressive Alliance (DPA)

The Dravida Munnetra Kazhagam-led Democratic Progressive Alliance, under the leadership of M. Karunanidhi withdrew its support from the Indian National Congress-led United Progressive Alliance government on 19 March 2013 over Sri Lanka issues. On 25 March 2014, DMK also expelled its south zone organisational secretary and the former minister of chemicals and fertilizers of the Republic of India M. K. Alagiri from the party for violating party discipline. DPA formed an alliance with Viduthalai Chiruthaigal Katchi (VCK), Manithaneya Makkal Katchi (MMK), the Indian Union Muslim League (IUML), and Puthiya Tamilagam (PT).

Indian National Congress (INC)

The Indian National Congress under the leadership of Rahul Gandhi stated that they would decide the prime ministerial candidate after the election. They lost their major ally, Dravida Munnetra Kazhagam last year. So INC decided to contest alone in all 39 seats in the state. The minister of shipping of the Republic of India G. K. Vasan and the minister of finance of the Republic of India P. Chidambaram, opted out of the election.

Left and Secular Alliance (LSA)

After six rounds of seat-sharing talks with All India Anna Dravida Munnetra Kazhagam for the Lok Sabha seats, the Communist Party of India (Marxist) and the Communist Party of India failed to bear fruit, and they opted to make an alliance of their own. On 14 March 2014 the two parties held a joint press conference in Chennai, declaring that CPI(M) would contest nine seats and CPI would contest eight seats.

== Seat sharing of parties ==
Party/Alliance		Flag	Electoral symbol	Portrait	Leader	Seats contested	
All India Anna Dravida Munnetra Kazhagam					J. Jayalalithaa	39	
National Democratic Alliance	Desiya Murpokku Dravida Kazhagam				Vijayakant	14	
National Democratic Alliance	Bharatiya Janata Party				Pon. Radhakrishnan	6 (Note: Originally BJP had decided to contest 7 seats, but their nomination was rejected in Nilgiris constituency.)	9
National Democratic Alliance	Indhiya Jananayaga Katchi				T. R. Paarivendhar	1	9
National Democratic Alliance	Kongunadu Makkal Desia Katchi				E. R. Eswaran	1	9
National Democratic Alliance	Puthiya Needhi Katchi				A. C. Shanmugam	1	9
National Democratic Alliance	Pattali Makkal Katchi				S. Ramadoss	8	
National Democratic Alliance	Marumalarchi Dravida Munnetra Kazhagam				Vaiko	7	
Democratic Progressive Alliance	Dravida Munnetra Kazhagam				M. Karunanidhi	34	
Democratic Progressive Alliance	Viduthalai Chiruthaigal Katchi				Thol. Thirumavalavan	2	
Democratic Progressive Alliance	Indian Union Muslim League				K. M. Kader Mohideen	1	
Democratic Progressive Alliance	Manithaneya Makkal Katchi				M. H. Jawahirullah	1	
Democratic Progressive Alliance	Puthiya Tamilagam				K. Krishnasamy	1	
Indian National Congress					B. S. Gnanadesikan	39	
Left and Secular Alliance	Communist Party of India (Marxist)				G. Ramakrishnan	9	
Left and Secular Alliance	Communist Party of India				D. Pandian	8	

== Candidates ==
Constituency		AIADMK		NDA		DPA		INC		LSA	
#	Name	Party	Candidate	Party	Candidate	Party	Candidate	Party	Candidate	Party	Candidate
1	Tiruvallur	ADMK	P. Venugopal	DMDK	V. Yuvaraj	VCK	D. Ravikumar	INC	M. Jayakumar	CPI	A. S. Kannan
2	Chennai North	ADMK	T. G. Venkatesh Babu	DMDK	M. Soundarapandian	DMK	R. Girirajan	INC	Biju Chacko	CPM	U. Vasuki
3	Chennai South	ADMK	J. Jayavardhan	BJP	La. Ganesan	DMK	T. K. S. Elangovan	INC	S. V. Ramani		
4	Chennai Central	ADMK	S. R. Vijayakumar	DMDK	Constandine Ravindran	DMK	Dayanidhi Maran	INC	C. D. Meyyappan		
5	Sriperumbudur	ADMK	K. N. Ramachandran	MDMK	R. Masilamani	DMK	S. Jagathrakshakan	INC	Arul Anbarasu		
6	Kancheepuram	ADMK	K. Maragatham	MDMK	C. E. Sathya	DMK	G. Selvam	INC	P. Viswanathan		
7	Arakkonam	ADMK	G. Hari	PMK	R. Velu	DMK	N. R. Elango	INC	R. Rajesh		
8	Vellore	ADMK	B. Senguttuvan	BJP	A. C. Shanmugam (Note: Puthiya Needhi Katchi (PNK) contested on the "Lotus" symbol of the Bhartiya Janata Party (BJP), and is officially recorded as a BJP candidate in electoral records.)	IUML	M. Abdul Rahman	INC	J. Vijay Elanchezian		
9	Krishnagiri	ADMK	K. Ashok Kumar	PMK	G. K. Mani	DMK	P. Chinna Pillappa	INC	A. Chellakumar		
10	Dharmapuri	ADMK	P. S. Mohan	PMK	Anbumani Ramadoss	DMK	R. Thamaraiselvan	INC	Rama Suganthan		
11	Tiruvannamalai	ADMK	R. Vanaroja	PMK	G. Ediroli Manian	DMK	C. N. Annadurai	INC	A. Subramaniyan		
12	Arani	ADMK	V. Elumalai	PMK	A. K. Moorthy	DMK	R. Sivanandam	INC	M. K. Vishnu Prasad		
13	Viluppuram	ADMK	S. Rajendran	DMDK	K. Umasankar	DMK	K. Muthaiyan	INC	K. Rani	CPM	G. Anandan
14	Kallakurichi	ADMK	K. Kamaraj	DMDK	V. P. Eswaran	DMK	R. Manimaran	INC	R. Devadass		
15	Salem	ADMK	V. Pannerselvam	DMDK	L.K. Sudhish	DMK	S. Umarani	INC	R. M. Kumaramangalam		
16	Namakkal	ADMK	P. R. Sundaram	DMDK	S. K. Vel	DMK	S. Gandhiselvan	INC	G. R. Subramaniyan		
17	Erode	ADMK	S. Selvakumara Chinnayan	MDMK	A. Ganeshamurthi	DMK	H. Pavithravalli	INC	P. Gopi		
18	Tiruppur	ADMK	V. Sathyabama	DMDK	N. Dineshkumar	DMK	M. Senthilnathan	INC	E. V. K. S. Elangovan	CPI	K. Subbarayan
19	Nilgiris	ADMK	C. Gopalakrishnan			DMK	A. Raja	INC	P. Gandhi		
20	Coimbatore	ADMK	P. Nagarajan	BJP	C. P. Radhakrishnan	DMK	K. Ganeshkumar	INC	R. Prabhu	CPM	P. R. Natarajan
21	Pollachi	ADMK	C. Mahendran	BJP	E. R. Eswaran (Note: Kongunadu Makkal Desia Katchi (KMDK) contested on the "Lotus" symbol of the Bhartiya Janata Party (BJP), and is officially recorded as a BJP candidate in electoral records.)	DMK	Pongalur N. Palanisamy	INC	Selvaraj		
22	Dindigul	ADMK	M. Udhaya Kumar	DMDK	A. Krishnamoorthy	DMK	S. Gandhirajan	INC	N. S. V. Chitthan	CPM	N. Pandi
23	Karur	ADMK	M. Thambidurai	DMDK	N. S. Krishnan	DMK	M. Chinnasamy	INC	S. Jothimani		
24	Tiruchirappalli	ADMK	P. Kumar	DMDK	A. M. G. Vijaykumar	DMK	Mu. Anbhalagan	INC	Sarubala R. Tondaiman	CPM	S. Sridhar
25	Perambalur	ADMK	R. P. Marutharajaa	BJP	T. R. Paarivendhar (Note: Indiya Jananayaka Katchi (IJK) contested on the "Lotus" symbol of the Bhartiya Janata Party (BJP), and is officially recorded as a BJP candidate in electoral records.)	DMK	S. Seemanur Prabu	INC	M. Rajasekharan		
26	Cuddalore	ADMK	A. Arunmozhithevan	DMDK	C. R. Jayasankar	DMK	K. Nandagopalakrishnan	INC	K. S. Alagiri	CPI	K. Balasubramanian
27	Chidambaram	ADMK	M. Chandrakasi	PMK	Sudhamanirathinem	VCK	Thol. Thirumavalavan	INC	P. Vallal Peruman		
28	Mayiladuthurai	ADMK	R. K. Bharathi Mohan	PMK	K. Agoram	MNMK	S. Hyder Ali	INC	Mani Shankar Aiyar		
29	Nagapattinam	ADMK	K. Gopal	PMK	Vadivel Ravanan	DMK	A. K. S. Vijayan	INC	Thalai Senthilpandian	CPI	G. Palanisamy
30	Thanjavur	ADMK	K. Parasuraman	BJP	M. Muruganantham	DMK	T. R. Baalu	INC	T. Krishnasamy Vandayar	CPM	S. Tamilselvi
31	Sivaganga	ADMK	P. R. Senthilnathan	BJP	H. Raja	DMK	Dhurai Raaj Subha	INC	Karti P. Chidambaram	CPI	S. Krishnan
32	Madurai	ADMK	R. Gopalakrishnan	DMDK	D. Sivamuthu Kumar	DMK	V. Velusamy	INC	T. N. Bharath Nachiappan	CPM	B. Vikraman
33	Theni	ADMK	R. Parthipan	MDMK	K. Alagusundaram	DMK	Pon. Muthuramalingam	INC	J. M. Aaroon Rashid		
34	Virudhunagar	ADMK	T. Radhakrishnan	MDMK	Vaiko	DMK	S. Rethinavelu	INC	B. Manickam Tagore	CPM	K. Samuelraj
35	Ramanathapuram	ADMK	A. Anwhar Raajhaa	BJP	D. Kuppu Ramu	DMK	S. Mohamed Jaleel	INC	Su. Thirunavukkarasar	CPI	R. T. Uma Mageswari
36	Thoothukkudi	ADMK	J. Jayasingh Natterjee	MDMK	S. Joel	DMK	P. Jegan	INC	A. P. C. V. Shanmugam	CPI	A. Mohanraj
37	Tenkasi	ADMK	M. Vasanthi	MDMK	T. Sadhan Tirumalaikumar	PT	K. Krishnasamy	INC	K. Jayakumar	CPI	P. Lingam
38	Tirunelveli	ADMK	K. R. P. Prabakaran	DMDK	S. Sivananenthaperumal	DMK	Devadasa Sundaram	INC	S. S. Ramasubbu		
39	Kanniyakumari	ADMK	D. John Thankam	BJP	Pon. Radhakrishnan	DMK	F. M. Rajarathnam	INC	H. Vasanthakumar	CPM	A. V. Bellarmin

== Opinion poll ==
Polling agency	Date published						Lead	Ref.
Polling agency	Date published	AIADMK	NDA	DPA	INC	Others	Lead	Ref.
Times Now-India TV-CVoter	August – October 2013	28	0	5	1	5	AIADMK	
India Today-CVoter	December 2013 – January 2014	29	–	5	0	5	AIADMK	
Times Now-India TV-CVoter	January – February 2014	27	0	5	1	6	AIADMK	
NDTV-Hansa Research	March 2014	27	0	10	0	2	AIADMK	
CNN-IBN-Lokniti-CSDS	March – April 2014	15–21	6 – 10	10 – 16	0	0	AIADMK	
NDTV-Hansa Research	April 2014	22	3	14	0	0	AIADMK	
India Today-Cicero	4 – 12 April 2014	20–24	4 – 6	9 – 13	0	0–2	AIADMK	

== Results ==
=== By Party ===
Party		Popular vote			Seats		
Party		Votes	%	±pp	Contested	Won	+/−
All India Anna Dravida Munnetra Kazhagam		17,978,922	44.92	▲22.01	39	37	▲28
NDA	Bharatiya Janata Party	2,223,566	5.56	▲3.21	9	1	▲1
NDA	Pattali Makkal Katchi	1,804,812	4.51	▼1.21	8	1	▲1
NDA	Desiya Murpokku Dravida Kazhagam	2,078,843	5.19	▼4.89	14	0	Steady
NDA	Marumalarchi Dravida Munnetra Kazhagam	1,417,535	3.54	▼0.12	7	0	▼1
NDA	Total	7,524,756	18.80	▼3.01	38	2	▲1
DPA	Dravida Munnetra Kazhagam	9,570,666	23.91	▼1.21	34	0	▼18
DPA	Viduthalai Chiruthaigal Katchi	606,110	1.51	▼0.90	2	0	▼1
DPA	Puthiya Tamilagam	262,812	0.66	▲0.26	1	0	Steady
DPA	Manithaneya Makkal Katchi	236,679	0.59	▲0.37	1	0	Steady
DPA	Indian Union Muslim League	205,896	0.51	Steady	1	0	Steady
DPA	Total	10,882,163	27.18	▼1.48	39	0	▼19
Indian National Congress		1,750,990	4.37	▼10.66	39	0	▼8
LSA	Communist Party of India (Marxist)	220,632	0.55	▼1.65	9	0	▼1
LSA	Communist Party of India	219,866	0.55	▼2.30	8	0	▼1
LSA	Total	440,498	1.10	▼3.95	17	0	▼2
Others		866,317	2.20	Steady	673	0	Steady
NOTA		581,782	1.43	Steady			
Total		40,025,367	100	N/A	845	39	N/A
Vote statistics
Valid votes		40,025,367	72.62				
Invalid votes		651,915	1.12				
Votes cast/turnout		40,644,282	73.74				
Abstentions		14,470,585	26.26				
Registered voters		55,114,867	100				

=== By Member ===
37	1	1
AIADMK	BJP	PMK

=== By Constituency ===
Constituency		Winner				Runner Up				Margin	%
#	Name	Candidate	Party	Votes	%	Candidate	Party	Votes	%	Margin	%
1	Tiruvallur	P. Venugopal	ADMK	628,499	50.10	D. Ravikumar	VCK	305,069	24.32	323,430	25.78
2	Chennai North	T. G. Venkatesh Babu	ADMK	406,704	44.67	R. Girirajan	DMK	307,000	33.72	99,704	10.95
3	Chennai South	J. Jayavardhan	ADMK	434,540	40.03	T. K. S. Elangovan	DMK	298,965	27.54	135,575	12.49
4	Chennai Central	S. R. Vijayakumar	ADMK	333,296	40.88	Dayanidhi Maran	DMK	287,455	35.26	45,841	5.62
5	Sriperumbudur	K. N. Ramachandran	ADMK	545,820	42.42	S. Jagathrakshakan	DMK	443,174	34.44	102,646	7.98
6	Kancheepuram	K. Maragatham	ADMK	499,395	44.20	G. Selvam	DMK	352,529	31.20	146,866	13.00
7	Arakkonam	G. Hari	ADMK	493,534	45.29	N. R. Elango	DMK	252,768	23.19	240,766	22.10
8	Vellore	B. Senguttuvan	ADMK	383,719	39.35	A. C. Shanmugam	BJP	324,326	33.26	59,393	6.09
9	Krishnagiri	K. Ashok Kumar	ADMK	480,491	44.93	P. Chinna Pillappa	DMK	273,900	25.61	206,591	19.32
10	Dharmapuri	Anbumani Ramadoss	PMK	468,194	42.46	P. S. Mohan	ADMK	391,048	35.46	77,146	7.00
11	Tiruvannamalai	R. Vanaroja	ADMK	500,751	46.86	C. N. Annadurai	DMK	332,145	31.08	168,606	15.78
12	Arani	V. Elumalai	ADMK	502,721	45.85	R. Sivanandam	DMK	258,877	23.61	243,844	22.24
13	Viluppuram	S. Rajendran	ADMK	482,704	45.19	K. Muthaiyan	DMK	289,337	27.09	193,367	18.10
14	Kallakurichi	K. Kamaraj	ADMK	533,383	48.16	R. Manimaran	DMK	309,876	27.98	223,507	20.18
15	Salem	V. Pannerselvam	ADMK	556,546	48.36	S. Umarani	DMK	288,936	25.11	267,610	23.25
16	Namakkal	P. R. Sundaram	ADMK	563,272	53.14	S. Gandhiselvan	DMK	268,898	25.37	294,374	27.77
17	Erode	S. S. Chinnayan	ADMK	466,995	46.26	A. Ganeshamurthi	MDMK	255,432	25.30	211,563	20.96
18	Tiruppur	V. Sathyabama	ADMK	442,778	42.14	N. Dineshkumar	DMDK	263,463	25.07	179,315	17.07
19	Nilgiris	C. Gopalakrishnan	ADMK	463,700	49.67	A. Raja	DMK	358760	38.43	104,940	11.24
20	Coimbatore	P. Nagarajan	ADMK	431,717	36.69	C. P. Radhakrishnan	BJP	389,701	33.12	42,016	3.57
21	Pollachi	C. Mahendran	ADMK	417,092	41.18	E. R. Eswaran	BJP	276,118	27.26	140,974	13.92
22	Dindigul	M. Udhaya Kumar	ADMK	510,462	47.10	S. Gandhirajan	DMK	382,617	35.31	127,845	11.79
23	Karur	M. Thambidurai	ADMK	540,722	51.64	M. Chinnasamy	DMK	345,475	32.99	195,247	18.65
24	Tiruchirappalli	P. Kumar	ADMK	458,478	46.37	Mu. Anbhalagan	DMK	308,002	31.15	150,476	15.22
25	Perambalur	R. P. Marutharajaa	ADMK	462,693	44.85	S. Seemanur Prabu	DMK	249,645	24.20	213,048	20.65
26	Cuddalore	A. Arunmozhithevan	ADMK	481,429	48.87	K. Nandagopalakrishnan	DMK	278,304	28.25	203,125	20.62
27	Chidambaram	M. Chandrakasi	ADMK	429,536	39.45	Thol. Thirumavalavan	VCK	301,041	27.65	128,495	11.80
28	Mayiladuthurai	R. K. Bharathi Mohan	ADMK	513,729	50.04	S. Hyder Ali	MNMK	236,679	23.06	277,050	26.98
29	Nagapattinam	K. Gopal	ADMK	434,174	46.06	A. K. S. Vijayan	DMK	328,095	34.81	106,079	11.25
30	Thanjavur	K. Parasuraman	ADMK	510,307	50.39	T. R. Baalu	DMK	366,188	36.16	144,119	14.23
31	Sivaganga	P. R. Senthilnathan	ADMK	475,993	46.33	Dhurai Raaj Subha	DMK	246,608	24.00	229,385	22.33
32	Madurai	R. Gopalakrishnan	ADMK	453,785	46.48	V. Velusamy	DMK	254,361	26.05	199,424	20.43
33	Theni	R. Parthipan	ADMK	571,254	53.06	Pon. Muthuramalingam	DMK	256,722	23.84	314,532	29.22
34	Virudhunagar	T. Radhakrishnan	ADMK	406,694	40.20	Vaiko	MDMK	261,143	25.81	145,551	14.39
35	Ramanathapuram	A. Anwhar Raajhaa	ADMK	405,945	40.54	S. Mohamed Jaleel	DMK	286,621	28.63	119,324	11.91
36	Thoothukkudi	J. Thiyagaraj Natterjee	ADMK	366,052	39.92	P. Jegan	DMK	242,050	26.40	124,002	13.52
37	Tenkasi	M. Vasanthi	ADMK	424,586	41.65	K. Krishnasamy	PT	262,812	25.78	161,774	15.87
38	Tirunelveli	K. R. P. Prabakaran	ADMK	398,139	41.36	Devadasa Sundaram	DMK	272,040	28.26	126,099	13.10
39	Kanniyakumari	Pon. Radhakrishnan	BJP	372,906	37.62	H. Vasanthakumar	INC	244,244	24.64	128,662	12.98

== Assembly Seat wise leads ==
Lok Sabha	Constituency		Winner		Runner-up		2nd Runner-up		Margin
Lok Sabha	#	Name	Party	Votes	Party	Votes	Party	Votes	Margin
Tiruvallur	1	Gummidipoondi	ADMK	1,01,570	VCK	40,215	DMDK	36,472	61,355
Tiruvallur	2	Ponneri (SC)	ADMK	95,281	VCK	47,219	DMDK	22,716	48,062
Tiruvallur	4	Thiruvallur	ADMK	93,878	VCK	43,244	DMDK	32,739	50,634
Tiruvallur	5	Poonamallee (SC)	ADMK	1,09,435	VCK	53,360	DMDK	31,597	56,075
Tiruvallur	6	Avadi	ADMK	1,11,114	VCK	58,898	DMDK	40,739	52,216
Tiruvallur	9	Madhavaram	ADMK	1,17,092	VCK	62,002	DMDK	40,428	55,090
Chennai North	10	Thiruvottiyur	ADMK	87,020	DMK	56,122	DMDK	15,585	30,898
Chennai North	11	R. K. Nagar	ADMK	74,760	DMK	48,301	DMDK	13,683	26,459
Chennai North	12	Perambur	ADMK	77,018	DMK	56,313	DMDK	17,745	20,705
Chennai North	13	Kolathur	ADMK	59,637	DMK	59,422	DMDK	17,185	215
Chennai North	15	Thiru-Vi-Ka-Nagar (SC)	ADMK	57,638	DMK	47,386	DMDK	11,302	10,252
Chennai North	17	Royapuram	ADMK	50,479	DMK	39,143	DMDK	11,452	11,336
Chennai South	22	Virugampakkam	ADMK	65,727	BJP	41,181	DMK	40,651	24,546
Chennai South	23	Saidapet	ADMK	65,253	DMK	54,171	BJP	30,255	11,082
Chennai South	24	Thiyagarayanagar	ADMK	53,416	BJP	41,358	DMK	33,114	12,058
Chennai South	25	Mylapore	ADMK	59,646	DMK	44,382	BJP	35,719	15,264
Chennai South	26	Velachery	ADMK	62,655	BJP	47,405	DMK	42,613	15,250
Chennai South	27	Shozhinganallur	ADMK	1,31,396	DMK	86,310	BJP	60,576	45,086
Chennai Central	14	Villivakkam	ADMK	60,606	DMK	50,381	DMDK	17,918	10,225
Chennai Central	16	Egmore (SC)	ADMK	47,494	DMK	43,582	DMDK	17,108	3,912
Chennai Central	18	Harbour	ADMK	35,385	DMK	34,661	DMDK	25,904	724
Chennai Central	19	Chepauk-Thiruvallikeni	ADMK	56,526	DMK	56,062	DMDK	12,511	464
Chennai Central	20	Thousand Lights	ADMK	58,549	DMK	50,438	DMDK	17,276	8,111
Chennai Central	21	Anna Nagar	ADMK	74,543	DMK	51,856	DMDK	24,042	22,687
Sriperumbudur	7	Maduravoyal	ADMK	98,344	DMK	66,149	MDMK	40,196	32,195
Sriperumbudur	8	Ambattur	ADMK	87,889	DMK	64,571	MDMK	33,898	23,318
Sriperumbudur	28	Alandur	ADMK	86,581	DMK	68,546	MDMK	25,384	18,035
Sriperumbudur	29	Sriperumbudur (SC)	ADMK	87,909	DMK	81,214	MDMK	25,855	6,695
Sriperumbudur	30	Pallavaram	ADMK	97,338	DMK	87,025	MDMK	29,543	10,313
Sriperumbudur	31	Tambaram	ADMK	87,582	DMK	75,401	MDMK	32,173	12,181
Kancheepuram	32	Chengalpattu	ADMK	90,460	DMK	75,517	MDMK	45,861	14,943
Kancheepuram	33	Thiruporur	ADMK	79,031	DMK	51,175	MDMK	44,396	27,856
Kancheepuram	34	Cheyyur (SC)	ADMK	70,319	DMK	50,553	MDMK	26,917	19,766
Kancheepuram	35	Madurantakam (SC)	ADMK	79,101	DMK	50,005	MDMK	25,373	29,096
Kancheepuram	36	Uthiramerur	ADMK	83,305	DMK	61,544	MDMK	28,936	21,761
Kancheepuram	37	Kancheepuram	ADMK	96,794	DMK	63,057	MDMK	35,397	33,737
Arakkonam	3	Tiruttani	ADMK	1,00,165	DMK	45,619	PMK	34,668	54,546
Arakkonam	38	Arakkonam (SC)	ADMK	74,594	DMK	34,907	PMK	32,431	39,687
Arakkonam	39	Sholingur	ADMK	79,207	PMK	60,797	DMK	37,145	18,410
Arakkonam	40	Katpadi	ADMK	75,358	DMK	43,130	PMK	28,488	32,228
Arakkonam	41	Ranipet	ADMK	73,690	DMK	47,281	PMK	39,659	26,409
Arakkonam	42	Arcot	ADMK	89,653	DMK	43,991	PMK	37,347	45,662
Vellore	43	Vellore	ADMK	56,931	BJP	55,011	IUML	37,877	1,920
Vellore	44	Anaikattu	ADMK	66,398	BJP	65,381	IUML	23,750	1,017
Vellore	45	Kilvaithinankuppam (SC)	ADMK	65,138	BJP	59,491	IUML	19,136	5,647
Vellore	46	Gudiyattam (SC)	ADMK	79,741	BJP	45,768	IUML	44,895	33,973
Vellore	47	Vaniyambadi	ADMK	57,272	BJP	54,150	IUML	39,760	3,122
Vellore	48	Ambur	ADMK	58,103	BJP	44,257	IUML	39,821	13,846
Krishnagiri	51	Uthangarai (SC)	ADMK	72,985	PMK	46,423	DMK	35,184	26,562
Krishnagiri	52	Bargur	ADMK	80,493	PMK	40,684	DMK	36,827	39,809
Krishnagiri	53	Krishnagiri	ADMK	80,361	PMK	46,196	DMK	43,850	34,165
Krishnagiri	54	Veppanahalli	ADMK	83,112	DMK	56,291	PMK	23,730	26,821
Krishnagiri	55	Hosur	ADMK	89,237	DMK	54,318	PMK	38,944	34,919
Krishnagiri	56	Thalli	ADMK	74,253	DMK	47,406	PMK	28,943	26,847
Dharmapuri	57	Palacode	PMK	69,625	ADMK	63,850	DMK	29,511	5,775
Dharmapuri	58	Pennagaram	PMK	89,654	ADMK	51,261	DMK	26,480	38,393
Dharmapuri	59	Dharmapuri	PMK	95,041	ADMK	56,004	DMK	28,702	39,037
Dharmapuri	60	Pappireddippatti	PMK	90,012	ADMK	65,785	DMK	30,247	24,227
Dharmapuri	61	Harur (SC)	ADMK	78,185	PMK	51,558	DMK	33,636	26,627
Dharmapuri	85	Mettur	ADMK	75,633	PMK	71,885	DMK	31,534	3,748
Tiruvannamalai	49	Jolarpet	ADMK	82,898	DMK	46,175	PMK	26,110	36,723
Tiruvannamalai	50	Tirupattur	ADMK	79,498	DMK	48,065	PMK	24,505	31,433
Tiruvannamalai	62	Chengam (SC)	ADMK	93,561	DMK	55,820	PMK	28,251	37,741
Tiruvannamalai	63	Tiruvannamalai	ADMK	80,810	DMK	68,712	PMK	20,147	12,098
Tiruvannamalai	64	Kilpennathur	ADMK	76,511	DMK	62,437	PMK	32,951	14,074
Tiruvannamalai	65	Kalasapakkam	ADMK	86,059	DMK	49,057	PMK	25,427	37,002
Arani	66	Polur	ADMK	81,935	DMK	45,473	PMK	38,512	36,462
Arani	67	Arani	ADMK	98,727	DMK	51,106	PMK	32,923	47,621
Arani	68	Cheyyar	ADMK	84,891	PMK	48,540	DMK	46,367	36,351
Arani	69	Vandavasi (SC)	ADMK	72,860	PMK	42,629	DMK	42,523	30,231
Arani	70	Gingee	ADMK	89,539	PMK	43,409	DMK	41,761	46,130
Arani	71	Mailam	ADMK	73,710	PMK	46,297	DMK	30,286	27,413
Viluppuram	72	Tindivanam (SC)	ADMK	74,968	DMK	40,763	DMDK	36,032	34,205
Viluppuram	73	Vanur (SC)	ADMK	85,666	DMK	41,767	DMDK	30,703	43,899
Viluppuram	74	Villupuram	ADMK	80,170	DMK	56,729	DMDK	32,453	23,441
Viluppuram	75	Vikravandi	ADMK	71,750	DMK	43,040	DMDK	39,827	28,710
Viluppuram	76	Tirukkoyilur	ADMK	75,326	DMK	46,614	DMDK	31,447	28,712
Viluppuram	77	Ulundurpettai	ADMK	93,416	DMK	58,921	DMDK	38,700	34,495
Kallakurichi	78	Rishivandiyam	ADMK	80,341	DMK	55,390	DMDK	28,217	24,951
Kallakurichi	79	Sankarapuram	ADMK	89,089	DMK	59,440	DMDK	24,060	29,649
Kallakurichi	80	Kallakurichi (SC)	ADMK	97,538	DMK	57,253	DMDK	29,990	40,285
Kallakurichi	81	Gangavalli (SC)	ADMK	80,141	DMK	41,192	DMDK	23,998	38,949
Kallakurichi	82	Attur (SC)	ADMK	84,127	DMK	43,485	DMDK	28,134	40,642
Kallakurichi	83	Yercaud (ST)	ADMK	1,00,129	DMK	51,777	DMDK	29,620	48,352
Salem	84	Omalur	ADMK	92,434	DMK	45,707	DMDK	44,782	46,727
Salem	86	Edappadi	ADMK	97,855	DMDK	45,152	DMK	42,323	52,703
Salem	88	Salem (West)	ADMK	86,590	DMK	50,784	DMDK	32,787	35,806
Salem	89	Salem (North)	ADMK	82,695	DMK	50,061	DMDK	26,507	32,634
Salem	90	Salem (South)	ADMK	99,209	DMK	45,729	DMDK	25,037	53,480
Salem	91	Veerapandi	ADMK	97,278	DMK	53,948	DMDK	26,821	43,330
Namakkal	87	Sankari	ADMK	97,440	DMK	51,335	DMDK	34,320	46,105
Namakkal	92	Rasipuram (SC)	ADMK	97,398	DMK	45,930	DMDK	19,174	51,468
Namakkal	93	Senthamangalam (ST)	ADMK	99,271	DMK	44,868	DMDK	19,503	54,403
Namakkal	94	Namakkal	ADMK	93,640	DMK	45,346	DMDK	27,983	48,294
Namakkal	95	Paramathi-Velur	ADMK	86,757	DMK	40,507	DMDK	21,875	46,250
Namakkal	96	Tiruchengodu	ADMK	88,393	DMK	40,425	DMDK	23,913	47,968
Erode	97	Kumarapalayam	ADMK	92,745	DMK	33,948	MDMK	33,784	58,797
Erode	98	Erode (East)	ADMK	59,988	MDMK	38,429	DMK	35,053	21,559
Erode	99	Erode (West)	ADMK	75,227	MDMK	51,490	DMK	33,772	23,737
Erode	100	Modakkurichi	ADMK	74,726	MDMK	52,402	DMK	29,465	22,324
Erode	101	Dharapuram (SC)	ADMK	78,183	DMK	48,846	MDMK	36,459	29,337
Erode	102	Kangayam	ADMK	85,513	MDMK	42,194	DMK	35,276	43,319
Tiruppur	103	Perundurai	ADMK	75,999	DMDK	43,162	DMK	27,392	32,837
Tiruppur	104	Bhavani	ADMK	77,493	DMDK	43,374	DMK	30,675	34,119
Tiruppur	105	Anthiyur	ADMK	65,256	DMDK	36,000	DMK	34,372	29,256
Tiruppur	106	Gobichettipalayam	ADMK	77,231	DMK	46,482	DMDK	38,981	30,749
Tiruppur	113	Tiruppur (North)	ADMK	86,510	DMDK	59,426	DMK	32,623	27,084
Tiruppur	114	Tiruppur (South)	ADMK	59,811	DMDK	42,109	DMK	33,322	17,702
Nilgiris	107	Bhavanisagar (SC)	ADMK	97,005	DMK	67,748	INC	6,264	29,257
Nilgiris	108	Udhagamandalam	ADMK	63,023	DMK	53,092	INC	5,708	9,931
Nilgiris	109	Gudalur (SC)	DMK	51,091	ADMK	48,877	INC	7,360	2,214
Nilgiris	110	Coonoor	ADMK	57,882	DMK	56,343	INC	4,346	1,539
Nilgiris	111	Mettuppalayam	ADMK	1,00,332	DMK	72,253	INC	6,478	28,079
Nilgiris	112	Avanashi (SC)	ADMK	96,151	DMK	56,747	INC	7,524	39,404
Coimbatore	115	Palladam	ADMK	91,733	BJP	71,034	DMK	34,811	20,699
Coimbatore	116	Sulur	ADMK	79,687	BJP	66,328	DMK	30,951	13,359
Coimbatore	117	Kavundampalayam	ADMK	95,394	BJP	81,796	DMK	46,124	13,598
Coimbatore	118	Coimbatore (North)	ADMK	62,402	BJP	60,384	DMK	34,171	2,018
Coimbatore	120	Coimbatore (South)	BJP	48,930	ADMK	47,591	DMK	33,138	1,339
Coimbatore	121	Singanallur	BJP	60,439	ADMK	54,102	DMK	37,387	6,337
Pollachi	119	Thondamuthur	ADMK	68,705	BJP	56,522	DMK	48,629	12,183
Pollachi	122	Kinathukadavu	ADMK	75,546	BJP	55,955	DMK	48,488	19,591
Pollachi	123	Pollachi	ADMK	68,380	BJP	48,188	DMK	34,494	20,192
Pollachi	124	Valparai (SC)	ADMK	60,054	DMK	38,251	BJP	28,243	21,803
Pollachi	125	Udumalaipettai	ADMK	73,484	BJP	48,558	DMK	40,090	24,926
Pollachi	126	Madathukulam	ADMK	70,197	DMK	41,138	BJP	37,890	29,059
Dindigul	127	Palani	ADMK	80,298	DMK	62,974	DMDK	19,076	17,324
Dindigul	128	Oddanchatram	ADMK	81,083	DMK	66,239	DMDK	11,491	14,844
Dindigul	129	Athoor	DMK	93,751	ADMK	84,567	DMDK	13,248	9,184
Dindigul	130	Nilakkottai (SC)	ADMK	86,666	DMK	50,107	DMDK	11,905	36,559
Dindigul	131	Natham	ADMK	95,125	DMK	59,239	DMDK	16,212	35,886
Dindigul	132	Dindigul	ADMK	82,270	DMK	49,682	DMDK	21,774	32,588
Karur	133	Vedasandur	ADMK	1,01,172	DMK	54,792	DMDK	17,533	46,380
Karur	134	Aravakurichi	ADMK	70,012	DMK	63,017	DMDK	11,663	6,995
Karur	135	Karur	ADMK	92,415	DMK	64,313	DMDK	10,956	28,102
Karur	136	Krishnarayapuram (SC)	ADMK	88,252	DMK	55,116	DMDK	11,026	33,136
Karur	138	Manapparai	ADMK	1,04,235	DMK	58,863	DMDK	15,217	45,372
Karur	179	Viralimalai	ADMK	83,042	DMK	48,496	DMDK	10,052	34,546
Tiruchirappalli	139	Srirangam	ADMK	1,03,422	DMK	54,410	DMDK	19,347	49,012
Tiruchirappalli	140	Tiruchirappalli (West)	ADMK	65,379	DMK	59,535	DMDK	17,836	5,844
Tiruchirappalli	141	Tiruchirappalli (East)	ADMK	73,438	DMK	52,403	DMDK	15,853	21,035
Tiruchirappalli	142	Thiruverumbur	ADMK	75,109	DMK	55,636	DMDK	16,746	19,473
Tiruchirappalli	178	Gandharvakottai (SC)	ADMK	67,826	DMK	38,640	DMDK	9,938	29,186
Tiruchirappalli	180	Pudukkottai	ADMK	72,203	DMK	46,344	DMDK	14,847	25,859
Perambalur	137	Kulithalai	ADMK	75,201	DMK	40,946	BJP	38,431	34,255
Perambalur	143	Lalgudi	ADMK	66,898	DMK	41,603	BJP	36,350	25,295
Perambalur	144	Manachanallur	ADMK	75,954	BJP	41,201	DMK	39,020	34,753
Perambalur	145	Musiri	ADMK	75,308	BJP	40,573	DMK	35,255	34,735
Perambalur	146	Thuraiyur (SC)	ADMK	75,095	DMK	37,115	BJP	33,023	37,980
Perambalur	147	Perambalur (SC)	ADMK	93,621	DMK	54,722	BJP	47,713	38,899
Cuddalore	151	Tittakudi (SC)	ADMK	82,147	DMK	35,598	DMDK	21,371	46,549
Cuddalore	152	Vridhachalam	ADMK	83,342	DMK	45,105	DMDK	28,768	38,237
Cuddalore	153	Neyveli	ADMK	67,457	DMK	45,164	DMDK	23,043	22,293
Cuddalore	154	Panruti	ADMK	82,418	DMK	55,344	DMDK	24,644	27,074
Cuddalore	155	Cuddalore	ADMK	82,185	DMK	42,843	DMDK	22,735	39,342
Cuddalore	156	Kurinjipadi	ADMK	82,803	DMK	53,639	DMDK	26,453	29,164
Chidambaram	148	Kunnam	ADMK	82,225	VCK	51,444	PMK	44,413	30,781
Chidambaram	149	Ariyalur	ADMK	93,672	VCK	43,979	PMK	39,897	49,693
Chidambaram	150	Jayankondam	ADMK	79,632	PMK	58,480	VCK	42,150	21,152
Chidambaram	157	Bhuvanagiri	ADMK	63,683	VCK	55,688	PMK	51,253	7,995
Chidambaram	158	Chidambaram	ADMK	60,042	VCK	48,796	PMK	43,166	11,246
Chidambaram	159	Kattumannarkoil (SC)	VCK	58,294	ADMK	49,604	PMK	41,118	8,690
Mayiladuthurai	160	Sirkazhi (SC)	ADMK	80,423	MNMK	41,083	PMK	29,139	39,340
Mayiladuthurai	161	Mayiladuthurai	ADMK	75,859	MNMK	36,077	PMK	26,880	39,782
Mayiladuthurai	162	Poompuhar	ADMK	95,563	MNMK	44,508	PMK	25,023	51,055
Mayiladuthurai	170	Thiruvidaimarudur (SC)	ADMK	84,754	MNMK	38,140	PMK	29,004	46,614
Mayiladuthurai	171	Kumbakonam	ADMK	86,507	MNMK	36,832	PMK	21,082	49,675
Mayiladuthurai	172	Papanasam	ADMK	89,650	MNMK	39,412	INC	15,277	50,238
Nagapattinam	163	Nagapattinam	ADMK	68,391	DMK	45,316	CPI	5,380	23,075
Nagapattinam	164	Kilvelur (SC)	ADMK	58,484	DMK	45,322	CPI	15,685	13,162
Nagapattinam	165	Vedaranyam	ADMK	69,061	DMK	38,901	PMK	11,000	30,160
Nagapattinam	166	Thiruthuraipoondi (SC)	ADMK	64,772	DMK	51,550	CPI	36,345	13,222
Nagapattinam	168	Thiruvarur	DMK	75,985	ADMK	74,143	CPI	17,032	1,842
Nagapattinam	169	Nannilam	ADMK	98,391	DMK	69,894	PMK	7,903	28,497
Thanjavur	167	Mannargudi	ADMK	84,437	DMK	66,922	BJP	7,611	17,515
Thanjavur	173	Thiruvaiyaru	ADMK	98,405	DMK	69,236	BJP	7,950	29,169
Thanjavur	174	Thanjavur	ADMK	77,421	DMK	67,164	BJP	10,470	10,257
Thanjavur	175	Orathanadu	ADMK	92,334	DMK	57,057	BJP	6,529	35,277
Thanjavur	176	Pattukkottai	ADMK	76,792	DMK	56,827	BJP	13,516	19,965
Thanjavur	177	Peravurani	ADMK	80,198	DMK	47,243	BJP	12,371	32,955
Sivaganga	181	Thirumayam	ADMK	72,251	DMK	32,692	INC	17,771	39,559
Sivaganga	182	Alangudi	ADMK	68,383	DMK	36,113	BJP	19,317	32,270
Sivaganga	184	Karaikudi	ADMK	83,522	DMK	40,604	BJP	34,759	42,918
Sivaganga	185	Tiruppattur	ADMK	85,489	DMK	48,770	BJP	24,956	36,719
Sivaganga	186	Sivaganga	ADMK	83,597	DMK	38,739	BJP	21,902	44,858
Sivaganga	187	Manamadurai (SC)	ADMK	82,484	DMK	49,281	BJP	16,886	33,203
Madurai	188	Melur	ADMK	84,947	DMK	47,180	DMDK	11,292	37,767
Madurai	189	Madurai East	ADMK	92,444	DMK	57,736	DMDK	23,274	34,708
Madurai	191	Madurai North	ADMK	68,050	DMK	39,903	DMDK	25,119	28,147
Madurai	192	Madurai South	ADMK	64,769	DMK	30,887	DMDK	30,053	33,882
Madurai	193	Madurai Central	ADMK	62,044	DMK	40,688	DMDK	27,591	21,356
Madurai	194	Madurai West	ADMK	81,494	DMK	40,040	DMDK	29,852	41,454
Theni	190	Sholavandan (SC)	ADMK	83,587	DMK	42,818	MDMK	16,286	40,769
Theni	197	Usilampatti	ADMK	1,09,269	DMK	47,738	MDMK	17,631	61,531
Theni	198	Andipatti	ADMK	1,01,528	DMK	39,663	MDMK	23,996	61,865
Theni	199	Periyakulam (SC)	ADMK	85,581	DMK	43,894	MDMK	28,959	41,687
Theni	200	Bodinayakanur	ADMK	99,633	DMK	39,402	MDMK	23,784	60,231
Theni	201	Cumbum	ADMK	91,321	DMK	42,986	MDMK	23,567	48,335
Virudhunagar	195	Thiruparankundram	ADMK	81,338	MDMK	49,764	DMK	36,962	31,574
Virudhunagar	196	Thirumangalam	ADMK	82,891	MDMK	46,362	DMK	45,403	36,529
Virudhunagar	204	Sattur	ADMK	65,139	MDMK	45,823	DMK	40,099	19,316
Virudhunagar	205	Sivakasi	ADMK	64,840	MDMK	43,518	DMK	43,307	21,322
Virudhunagar	206	Virudhunagar	ADMK	55,130	MDMK	37,030	DMK	34,072	18,100
Virudhunagar	207	Aruppukkottai	ADMK	56,894	DMK	41,246	MDMK	37,820	15,648
Ramanathapuram	183	Aranthangi	ADMK	51,408	CPI	34,659	SDPI	26,774	16,749
Ramanathapuram	208	Tiruchuli	ADMK	73,467	CPI	47,975	BJP	14,446	25,492
Ramanathapuram	209	Paramakudi (SC)	ADMK	66,740	CPI	45,539	BJP	30,004	21,201
Ramanathapuram	210	Tiruvadanai	ADMK	69,739	CPI	53,385	BJP	29,234	16,354
Ramanathapuram	211	Ramanathapuram	ADMK	63,268	BJP	51,479	CPI	49,089	11,789
Ramanathapuram	212	Mudhukulathur	ADMK	80,848	CPI	55,373	BJP	26,278	25,475
Thoothukkudi	213	Vilathikulam	ADMK	65,903	DMK	34,999	MDMK	27,971	30,904
Thoothukkudi	214	Thoothukkudi	ADMK	63,690	DMK	44,617	MDMK	35,005	19,073
Thoothukkudi	215	Tiruchendur	ADMK	57,260	DMK	42,725	MDMK	27,869	14,535
Thoothukkudi	216	Srivaikuntam	ADMK	60,339	DMK	37,676	MDMK	27,428	22,663
Thoothukkudi	217	Ottapidaram (SC)	ADMK	56,990	DMK	42,733	MDMK	26,740	14,257
Thoothukkudi	218	Kovilpatti	ADMK	61,200	DMK	38,885	MDMK	36,558	22,315
Tenkasi	202	Rajapalayam	ADMK	70,718	PT	34,162	MDMK	33,770	36,556
Tenkasi	203	Srivilliputhur (SC)	ADMK	77,345	PT	44,323	MDMK	25,090	33,022
Tenkasi	219	Sankarankovil (SC)	ADMK	67,686	MDMK	39,011	PT	37,224	28,675
Tenkasi	220	Vasudevanallur (SC)	ADMK	64,074	PT	44,326	MDMK	25,607	19,748
Tenkasi	221	Kadayanallur	ADMK	67,931	PT	56,280	MDMK	28,971	11,651
Tenkasi	222	Tenkasi	ADMK	76,255	PT	45,442	MDMK	36,937	30,813
Tirunelveli	223	Alangulam	ADMK	76,156	DMK	53,011	DMDK	19,955	23,145
Tirunelveli	224	Tirunelveli	ADMK	77,116	DMK	49,728	DMDK	20,728	27,388
Tirunelveli	225	Ambasamudram	ADMK	69,547	DMK	41,249	DMDK	20,103	28,298
Tirunelveli	226	Palayamkottai	DMK	50,040	ADMK	49,128	DMDK	17,702	912
Tirunelveli	227	Nanguneri	ADMK	62,705	DMK	44,579	DMDK	21,384	18,126
Tirunelveli	228	Radhapuram	ADMK	63,125	DMK	32,867	DMDK	27,308	30,258
Kanniyakumari	229	Kanniyakumari	BJP	73,481	ADMK	53,961	DMK	32,631	19,520
Kanniyakumari	230	Nagercoil	BJP	71,876	ADMK	31,750	INC	25,402	40,126
Kanniyakumari	231	Colachel	BJP	62,931	INC	39,995	ADMK	26,220	22,936
Kanniyakumari	232	Padmanabhapuram	BJP	56,239	INC	48,880	ADMK	22,693	7,359
Kanniyakumari	233	Vilavancode	BJP	58,806	INC	51,957	ADMK	16,702	6,849
Kanniyakumari	234	Killiyoor	INC	52,095	BJP	49,239	ADMK	24,856	2,856
Tiruvallur	—	Postal Ballot	VCK	131	ADMK	129	DMDK	43	2
Chennai North	—	Postal Ballot	DMK	313	ADMK	152	DMDK	37	161
Chennai South	—	Postal Ballot	DMK	538	ADMK	311	BJP	292	227
Chennai Central	—	Postal Ballot	DMK	475	ADMK	193	DMDK	39	282
Sriperumbudur	—	Postal Ballot	DMK	268	ADMK	177	MDMK	45	91
Kancheepuram	—	Postal Ballot	DMK	678	ADMK	385	MDMK	200	293
Arakkonam	—	Postal Ballot	ADMK	867	DMK	695	PMK	372	172
Vellore	—	Postal Ballot	IUML	657	BJP	268	ADMK	136	389
Krishnagiri	—	Postal Ballot	ADMK	50	PMK	43	DMK	24	7
Dharmapuri	—	Postal Ballot	PMK	419	ADMK	330	DMK	187	89
Tiruvannamalai	—	Postal Ballot	DMK	1,879	ADMK	1,414	PMK	563	465
Arani	—	Postal Ballot	DMK	1,361	ADMK	1,059	PMK	1,022	302
Viluppuram	—	Postal Ballot	DMK	1,503	ADMK	1,408	DMDK	501	95
Kallakurichi	—	Postal Ballot	ADMK	2,018	DMK	1,339	DMDK	164	679
Salem	—	Postal Ballot	ADMK	485	DMK	384	DMDK	179	101
Namakkal	—	Postal Ballot	DMK	487	ADMK	373	DMDK	114	114
Erode	—	Postal Ballot	DMK	900	MDMK	674	ADMK	613	226
Tiruppur	—	Postal Ballot	DMK	545	ADMK	478	DMDK	411	67
Nilgiris	—	Postal Ballot	DMK	1,486	ADMK	430	AAP	27	1,056
Coimbatore	—	Postal Ballot	ADMK	808	BJP	790	DMK	501	18
Pollachi	—	Postal Ballot	BJP	762	DMK	739	ADMK	726	23
Dindigul	—	Postal Ballot	DMK	625	ADMK	453	DMDK	88	172
Karur	—	Postal Ballot	ADMK	1,594	DMK	878	DMDK	113	716
Tiruchirappalli	—	Postal Ballot	ADMK	1,101	DMK	1,034	DMDK	218	67
Perambalur	—	Postal Ballot	BJP	1,596	DMK	984	ADMK	616	612
Cuddalore	—	Postal Ballot	ADMK	1,077	DMK	611	DMDK	592	466
Chidambaram	—	Postal Ballot	VCK	690	PMK	689	ADMK	678	1
Mayiladuthurai	—	Postal Ballot	ADMK	973	MNMK	627	PMK	468	346
Nagapattinam	—	Postal Ballot	DMK	1,127	ADMK	932	PMK	181	195
Thanjavur	—	Postal Ballot	DMK	1,739	ADMK	720	BJP	74	1,019
Sivaganga	—	Postal Ballot	DMK	409	ADMK	267	BJP	184	142
Madurai	—	Postal Ballot	ADMK	419	DMK	297	DMDK	119	122
Theni	—	Postal Ballot	ADMK	335	DMK	221	MDMK	139	114
Virudhunagar	—	Postal Ballot	MDMK	826	ADMK	462	DMK	416	364
Ramanathapuram	—	Postal Ballot	DMK	601	ADMK	475	BJP	465	126
Thoothukkudi	—	Postal Ballot	ADMK	670	MDMK	620	DMK	415	50
Tenkasi	—	Postal Ballot	PT	1,055	MDMK	847	ADMK	577	208
Tirunelveli	—	Postal Ballot	DMK	566	ADMK	362	DMDK	190	204
Kanniyakumari	—	Postal Ballot	BJP	334	INC	145	DMK	61	189

== Analysis ==
The ruling AIADMK, after winning 37 out of 39 seats, emerged as the third largest party in the Lok Sabha, the lower house of the Indian Parliament. It is noted as the best performance by any party in the state since the INC, which secured 31 seats in the 1962 election. Prominent DMK leaders and former union cabinet ministers T. R. Baalu, A. Raja, and Dayanidhi Maran lost their respective seats. AIADMK's big success can be understood from the fact that, despite being a multi-cornered contest between AIADMK, NDA, DPA, INC, and LSA, 33 seats were won by the party with a margin of more than 1 lakh votes.

However, AIADMK general secretary J. Jayalalithaa ruled out joining the new government of India led by the BJP-led NDA.

After the result of the 1989 and 1991 elections, it was the third time that the DMK had no representative in the Lok Sabha and also happened the third time for the INC after the 1996 and 1998 elections. Similarly, the communist parties, the CPI and CPI(M), did not win any seats, their worst performances since the 1999 and 1996 elections, respectively.

The factors attributed to the sweeping result in favour of AIADMK were the implementation of various welfare schemes by the government led by J. Jayalalithaa and the hope people in Tamil Nadu had in her that she would protect Tamil interests.

== Key positions held by elected members of parliament ==
=== Deputy speakers of the Lok Sabha ===
No.	Portrait	Name (Birth–Death)	Elected constituency	Term in office			Political party	Speaker
No.	Portrait	Name (Birth–Death)	Elected constituency	Assumed office	Left office	Time in office	Political party	Speaker
1		M. Thambi Durai (b. 1947)	Karur	13 August 2014	25 May 2019	4 years, 285 days	All India Anna Dravida Munnetra Kazhagam	Sumitra Mahajan

=== Ministers of state of the Union ===
No.	Portrait	Name (Birth–Death)	Elected constituency	Portfolio	Term in office			Political party	Cabinet Minister
No.	Portrait	Name (Birth–Death)	Elected constituency	Portfolio	Assumed office	Left office	Time in office	Political party	Cabinet Minister
1		Pon. Radhakrishnan (b. 1952)	Kanniyakumari	Ministry of Heavy Industries and Public Enterprises	27 May 2014	8 November 2014	165 days	Bharatiya Janata Party	Anant Geete
1		Pon. Radhakrishnan (b. 1952)	Kanniyakumari	Ministry of Road Transport and Highways	9 November 2014	2 September 2017	2 years, 297 days	Bharatiya Janata Party	Nitin Gadkari
1		Pon. Radhakrishnan (b. 1952)	Kanniyakumari	Ministry of Shipping	9 November 2014	24 May 2019	4 years, 196 days	Bharatiya Janata Party	Nitin Gadkari
1		Pon. Radhakrishnan (b. 1952)	Kanniyakumari	Ministry of Finance	3 September 2017	24 May 2019	1 year, 263 days	Bharatiya Janata Party	Arun Jaitley Piyush Goyal Arun Jaitley

== See also ==
- Elections in India
- Elections in Tamil Nadu
- 2014 Indian general election
