= List of members of the 16th Lok Sabha =

Members of Lok Sabha (2014–19)

Seat distribution in the 16th Lok Sabha

This is a list of members of the 16th Lok Sabha (2014-2019), arranged by state-wise and union territory-wise representation in Lok sabha. These members of the Lower house of the Indian Parliament were elected in the 2014 Indian general election held from 7 April to 12 May 2014.

== Andhra Pradesh ==
Keys: TDP (15) YSRCP (2) BJP (2) Vacant (6)

No.	Constituency	Member of Parliament	Party affiliation	Roles and responsibilities
1	Araku (ST)	Kothapalli Geetha	YSR Congress Party	
2	Srikakulam	Ram Mohan Naidu Kinjarapu	Telugu Desam Party	
3	Vizianagaram	Ashok Gajapathi Raju	Telugu Desam Party	Cabinet Minister, Civil Aviation (2014–2018)
4	Visakhapatnam	Kambhampati Hari Babu	Bharatiya Janata Party	
5	Anakapalli	Muttamsetti Srinivasa Rao	Telugu Desam Party	
6	Kakinada	Thota Narasimham	Telugu Desam Party	Lok Sabha Leader, Telugu Desam Party
7	Amalapuram (SC)	Pandula Ravindra Babu	Telugu Desam Party	
8	Rajahmundry	Murali Mohan Maganti	Telugu Desam Party	
9	Narasapuram	Gokaraju Ganga Raju	Bharatiya Janata Party	
10	Eluru	Maganti Venkateswara Rao	Telugu Desam Party	
11	Machilipatnam	Konakalla Narayana Rao	Telugu Desam Party	
12	Vijayawada	Kesineni Srinivas	Telugu Desam Party	
13	Guntur	Galla Jayadev	Telugu Desam Party	
14	Narasaraopet	Rayapati Sambasiva Rao	Telugu Desam Party	
15	Bapatla (SC)	Malyadri Sriram	Telugu Desam Party	
16	Ongole	Y. V. Subba Reddy (resigned on 20 June 2018)	YSR Congress Party	
16	Ongole	Vacant from 20 June 2018		
17	Nandyal	S. P. Y. Reddy (Died on 30 April 2019)	YSR Congress Party	
17	Nandyal	Vacant from 30 April 2019		
18	Kurnool	Butta Renuka	YSR Congress Party	
19	Anantapur	J. C. Diwakar Reddy	Telugu Desam Party	
20	Hindupur	Kristappa Nimmala	Telugu Desam Party	
21	Kadapa	Y. S. Avinash Reddy (resigned on 20 June 2018)	YSR Congress Party	
21	Kadapa	Vacant from 20 June 2018		
22	Nellore	Mekapati Rajamohan Reddy (resigned on 20 June 2018)	YSR Congress Party	Lok Sabha Leader, YSR Congress Party (2014–2018)
22	Nellore	Vacant from 20 June 2018		
23	Tirupati (SC)	Varaprasad Rao Velagapalli (resigned on 20 June 2018)	YSR Congress Party	
23	Tirupati (SC)	Vacant from 20 June 2018		
24	Rajampet	P. V. Midhun Reddy (resigned on 20 June 2018)	YSR Congress Party	
24	Rajampet	Vacant from 20 June 2018		
25	Chittoor (SC)	Naramalli Sivaprasad	Telugu Desam Party	

== Arunachal Pradesh ==
Keys: BJP (1) INC (1)

No.	Constituency	Member of Parliament	Party affiliation	Roles and responsibilities
1	Arunachal West	Kiren Rijiju	Bharatiya Janata Party	Minister of State, Home Affairs
2	Arunachal East	Ninong Ering	Indian National Congress	

== Assam ==
Keys: BJP (7) INC (3) AIUDF (3) Independent (1)

No.	Constituency	Member of Parliament	Party affiliation	Roles and responsibilities
1	Karimganj (SC)	Radheshyam Biswas	All India United Democratic Front	
2	Silchar	Sushmita Dev	Indian National Congress	
3	Autonomous District (ST)	Biren Singh Engti	Indian National Congress	
4	Dhubri	Badruddin Ajmal	All India United Democratic Front	Lok Sabha Leader, All India United Democratic Front
5	Kokrajhar (ST)	Naba Kumar Saraniya	Independent	
6	Barpeta	Sirajuddin Ajmal	All India United Democratic Front	
7	Gauhati	Bijoya Chakravarty	Bharatiya Janata Party	
8	Mangaldoi	Ramen Deka	Bharatiya Janata Party	
9	Tezpur	Ram Prasad Sharma	Bharatiya Janata Party	
10	Nowgong	Rajen Gohain	Bharatiya Janata Party	
11	Kaliabor	Gaurav Gogoi	Indian National Congress	
12	Jorhat	Kamakhya Prasad Tasa	Bharatiya Janata Party	
13	Dibrugarh	Rameswar Teli	Bharatiya Janata Party	
14	Lakhimpur	Sarbananda Sonowal (resigned on 23 May 2016)	Bharatiya Janata Party	Minister of State (I/C), Youth Affairs and Sports (2014–2016), Minister of State (I/C), Skill Development and Entrepreneurship (2014)
14	Lakhimpur	Pradan Baruah (elected on 22 November 2016)	Bharatiya Janata Party	

== Bihar ==
Keys: BJP (21) LJP (6) RJD (4) RLSP (3) JD(U) (2) INC (1) Vacant (3)

No.	Constituency	Member of Parliament	Party affiliation	Roles and responsibilities
1	Valmiki Nagar	Satish Chandra Dubey	Bharatiya Janata Party	
2	Paschim Champaran	Sanjay Jaiswal	Bharatiya Janata Party	
3	Purvi Champaran	Radha Mohan Singh	Bharatiya Janata Party	
4	Sheohar	Rama Devi	Bharatiya Janata Party	
5	Sitamarhi	Ram Kumar Sharma	Rashtriya Lok Samta Party	
6	Madhubani	Hukmdev Narayan Yadav	Bharatiya Janata Party	
7	Jhanjharpur	Birendra Kumar Chaudhary	Bharatiya Janata Party	
8	Supaul	Ranjeet Ranjan	Indian National Congress	
9	Araria	Mohammed Taslimuddin (died on 17 September 2017)	Rashtriya Janata Dal	
9	Araria	Sarfaraz Alam (elected on 14 March 2018)	Rashtriya Janata Dal	
10	Kishanganj	Mohammad Asrarul Haque (died on 7 December 2018)	Indian National Congress	
10	Kishanganj	Vacant from 7 December 2018)		
11	Katihar	Tariq Anwar (resigned on 28 September 2018)	Nationalist Congress Party	
11	Katihar	Vacant from 28 September 2018)		
12	Purnia	Santosh Kumar Kushwaha	Janata Dal	
13	Madhepura	Rajesh Ranjan (Pappu Yadav)	Rashtriya Janata Dal	
14	Darbhanga	Kirti Azad	Bharatiya Janata Party	
15	Muzaffarpur	Ajay Nishad	Bharatiya Janata Party	
16	Vaishali	Rama Kishore Singh	Lok Janshakti Party	
17	Gopalganj (SC)	Janak Ram	Bharatiya Janata Party	
18	Siwan	Om Prakash Yadav	Bharatiya Janata Party	
19	Maharajganj	Janardan Singh Sigriwal	Bharatiya Janata Party	
20	Saran	Rajiv Pratap Rudy	Bharatiya Janata Party	Minister of State (I/C), Skill Development and Entrepreneurship (2014–2017), Minister of State, Parliamentary Affairs (2014–2016)
21	Hajipur (SC)	Ram Vilas Paswan	Lok Janshakti Party	Lok Sabha Leader, Lok Janshakti Party, Cabinet Minister, Consumer Affairs, Food and Public Distribution
22	Ujiarpur	Nityanand Rai	Bharatiya Janata Party	
23	Samastipur (SC)	Ram Chandra Paswan	Lok Janshakti Party	
24	Begusarai	Bhola Singh (died on 19 October 2018)	Bharatiya Janata Party	
24	Begusarai	Vacant from 19 October 2018		
25	Khagaria	Mehboob Ali Kaiser	Lok Janshakti Party	
26	Bhagalpur	Shailesh Kumar Mandal (Bulo Mandal)	Rashtriya Janata Dal	
27	Banka	Jay Prakash Narayan Yadav	Rashtriya Janata Dal	Lok Sabha Leader, Rashtriya Janata Dal
28	Munger	Veena Devi	Lok Janshakti Party	
29	Nalanda	Kaushalendra Kumar	Janata Dal	Lok Sabha Leader, Janata Dal (United)
30	Patna Sahib	Shatrughan Sinha	Bharatiya Janata Party	
31	Pataliputra	Ram Kripal Yadav	Bharatiya Janata Party	Minister of State, Drinking Water and Sanitation (2014–2016), Minister of State, Rural Development (2016–2019)
32	Arrah	Raj Kumar Singh	Bharatiya Janata Party	Minister of State (I/C), Power, and New and Renewable Energy (2017–2019)
33	Buxar	Ashwini Kumar Choubey	Bharatiya Janata Party	Minister of State, Health and Family Welfare (2017–2019)
34	Sasaram (SC)	Chhedi Paswan	Bharatiya Janata Party	
35	Karakat	Upendra Kushwaha	Rashtriya Lok Samta Party	Lok Sabha Leader, Rashtriya Lok Samta Party, Minister of State, Rural Development, Panchayati Raj, and Drinking Water and Sanitation (2014), Minister of State, Human Resource Development (2014–2018)
36	Jahanabad	Arun Kumar	Rashtriya Lok Samta Party	
37	Aurangabad	Sushil Kumar Singh	Bharatiya Janata Party	
38	Gaya (SC)	Hari Manjhi	Bharatiya Janata Party	
39	Nawada	Giriraj Singh	Bharatiya Janata Party	Minister of State, Micro, Small and Medium Enterprises (2014–2017), Minister of State (I/C), Micro, Small and Medium Enterprises (2017–2019)
40	Jamui (SC)	Chirag Paswan	Lok Janshakti Party	

== Chhattisgarh ==
Keys: BJP (10) Vacant (1)

No.	Constituency	Member of Parliament	Party affiliation	Roles and responsibilities
1	Sarguja (ST)	Kamalbhan Singh Marabi	Bharatiya Janata Party	
2	Raigarh (ST)	Vishnu Deo Sai	Bharatiya Janata Party	Minister of State, Labour and Employment (2014), Minister of State, Steel (2014–2019), Minister of State, Mines (2014–2016)
3	Janjgir-Champa (SC)	Kamla Devi Patle	Bharatiya Janata Party	
4	Korba	Banshilal Mahto	Bharatiya Janata Party	
5	Bilaspur	Lakhan Lal Sahu	Bharatiya Janata Party	
6	Rajnandgaon	Abhishek Singh	Bharatiya Janata Party	
7	Durg	Tamradhwaj Sahu (resigned on 21 December 2018)	Indian National Congress	
7	Durg	Vacant from 21 December 2018		
8	Raipur	Ramesh Bais	Bharatiya Janata Party	
9	Mahasamund	Chandu Lal Sahu	Bharatiya Janata Party	
10	Bastar (ST)	Dinesh Kashyap (elected on 13 May 2011)	Bharatiya Janata Party	
11	Kanker (ST)	Vikram Usendi	Bharatiya Janata Party	

== Goa ==
Keys: BJP (2)

No.	Constituency	Member of Parliament	Party affiliation	Roles and responsibilities
1	North Goa	Shripad Yesso Naik	Bharatiya Janata Party	Minister of State (I/C), Culture and Tourism (2014), Minister of State (I/C), AYUSH (2014–2019), Minister of State, Health and Family Welfare (2014–2016)
2	South Goa	Narendra Keshav Sawaikar	Bharatiya Janata Party	

== Gujarat ==
Keys: BJP (26)

No.	Constituency	Member of Parliament	Party affiliation	Roles and responsibilities
1	Kachchh (SC)	Vinodbhai Chavda	Bharatiya Janata Party	
2	Banaskantha	Haribhai Parthibhai Chaudhary	Bharatiya Janata Party	Minister of State, Home Affairs (2014–2016), Minister of State, Micro, Small and Medium Enterprises (2016–2017), Minister of State, Mines and Coal (2017–2019)
3	Patan	Liladhar Vaghela	Bharatiya Janata Party	
4	Mahesana	Jayshreeben Patel	Bharatiya Janata Party	
5	Sabarkantha	Dipsinh Shankarsinh Rathod	Bharatiya Janata Party	
6	Gandhinagar	L. K. Advani	Bharatiya Janata Party	
7	Ahmedabad East	Paresh Rawal	Bharatiya Janata Party	
8	Ahmedabad West (SC)	Kirit Premjibhai Solanki	Bharatiya Janata Party	
9	Surendranagar	Devjibhai Govindbhai Fatepara	Bharatiya Janata Party	
10	Rajkot	Mohan Kundariya	Bharatiya Janata Party	Minister of State, Agriculture (2014–2015), Minister of State, Agriculture and Farmers' Welfare (2015–2016)
11	Porbandar	Vitthal Radadiya (elected on 5 June 2013)	Bharatiya Janata Party	
12	Jamnagar	Poonamben Maadam	Bharatiya Janata Party	
13	Junagadh	Rajesh Chudasama	Bharatiya Janata Party	
14	Amreli	Naranbhai Kachhadia	Bharatiya Janata Party	
15	Bhavnagar	Bharti Shiyal	Bharatiya Janata Party	
16	Anand	Dilip Patel	Bharatiya Janata Party	
17	Kheda	Devusinh Jesingbhai Chauhan	Bharatiya Janata Party	
18	Panchmahal	Prabhatsinh Pratapsinh Chauhan	Bharatiya Janata Party	
19	Dahod (ST)	Jasvantsinh Sumanbhai Bhabhor	Bharatiya Janata Party	Minister of State, Tribal Affairs (2016–2019)
20	Vadodara	Narendra Modi (resigned on 29 May 2014)	Bharatiya Janata Party	Prime Minister and Leader of the House
20	Vadodara	Ranjanben Dhananjay Bhatt (elected on 16 September 2014)	Bharatiya Janata Party	
21	Chhota Udaipur (ST)	Ramsinh Rathwa	Bharatiya Janata Party	
22	Bharuch	Mansukhbhai Vasava	Bharatiya Janata Party	Minister of State, Tribal Affairs (2014–2016)
23	Bardoli (ST)	Parbhubhai Vasava	Bharatiya Janata Party	
24	Surat	Darshana Jardosh	Bharatiya Janata Party	
25	Navsari	C. R. Patil	Bharatiya Janata Party	
26	Valsad (ST)	K C Patel	Bharatiya Janata Party	

== Haryana ==
Keys: BJP (7) INLD (2) INC (1)

No.	Constituency	Member of Parliament	Party affiliation	Roles and responsibilities
1	Ambala (SC)	Rattan Lal Kataria	Bharatiya Janata Party	
2	Kurukshetra	Raj Kumar Saini	Bharatiya Janata Party	
3	Sirsa (SC)	Charanjeet Singh Rori	Indian National Lok Dal	Lok Sabha Leader, Indian National Lok Dal
4	Hisar	Dushyant Chautala	Indian National Lok Dal	
5	Karnal	Ashwini Kumar Chopra	Bharatiya Janata Party	
6	Sonipat	Ramesh Chander Kaushik	Bharatiya Janata Party	
7	Rohtak	Deepender Singh Hooda	Indian National Congress	
8	Bhiwani–Mahendragarh	Dharambir Singh	Bharatiya Janata Party	
9	Gurgaon	Rao Inderjit Singh	Bharatiya Janata Party	Minister of State (I/C), Planning (2014–2019), Minister of State (I/C), Statistics and Programme Implementation (2014), Minister of State, Defence (2014–2016), Minister of State, Chemicals and Fertilizers (2017–2019)
10	Faridabad	Krishan Pal Gurjar	Bharatiya Janata Party	Minister of State, Road Transport and Highways and Shipping (2014), Minister of State, Social Justice and Empowerment (2014–2019)

== Himachal Pradesh ==
Keys: BJP (4)

No.	Constituency	Member of Parliament	Party affiliation	Roles and responsibilities
1	Kangra	Ram Swaroop Sharma	Bharatiya Janata Party	
2	Mandi	Shanta Kumar	Bharatiya Janata Party	Chairman, Committee on Public Undertakings
3	Hamirpur	Anurag Singh Thakur	Bharatiya Janata Party	
4	Shimla (SC)	Virender Kashyap	Bharatiya Janata Party	

== Jammu & Kashmir ==
Keys: BJP (2) JKNC (1) JKPDP (1) Vacant (2)

No.	Constituency	Member of Parliament	Party affiliation	Roles and responsibilities
1	Baramulla	Muzaffar Hussain Baig	Jammu & Kashmir People's Democratic Party	Lok Sabha Leader, Jammu & Kashmir People's Democratic Party (2016–2019)
2	Srinagar	Tariq Hameed Karra (resigned on 17 October 2016)	Jammu & Kashmir People's Democratic Party	
2	Srinagar	Farooq Abdullah (elected on 15 April 2017)	Jammu & Kashmir National Conference	Lok Sabha Leader, Jammu & Kashmir National Conference
3	Anantnag	Mehbooba Mufti (resigned on 4 April 2016)	Jammu & Kashmir People's Democratic Party	Lok Sabha Leader, Jammu & Kashmir People's Democratic Party (2014–2016)
3	Anantnag	Vacant from 4 April 2016		
4	Ladakh	Thupstan Chhewang (resigned on 13 December 2018)	Bharatiya Janata Party	
4	Ladakh	Vacant from 13 December 2018		
5	Udhampur	Jitendra Singh	Bharatiya Janata Party	Minister of State (I/C), Science & Technology, Earth Sciences (2014), Minister of State (I/C), Development of North Eastern Region (2014–2019), Minister of State, Prime Minister's Office, Personnel, Public Grievances and Pensions
6	Jammu	Jugal Kishore Sharma	Bharatiya Janata Party	

== Jharkhand ==
Keys: BJP (12) JMM (2)

No.	Constituency	Member of Parliament	Party affiliation	Roles and responsibilities
1	Rajmahal (ST)	Vijay Kumar Hansdak	Jharkhand Mukti Morcha	
2	Dumka (ST)	Shibu Soren	Jharkhand Mukti Morcha	Lok Sabha Leader, Jharkhand Mukti Morcha
3	Godda	Nishikant Dubey	Bharatiya Janata Party	
4	Chatra	Sunil Kumar Singh	Bharatiya Janata Party	
5	Kodarma	Ravindra Kumar Ray	Bharatiya Janata Party	
6	Giridih	Ravindra Kumar Pandey	Bharatiya Janata Party	
7	Dhanbad	Pashupati Nath Singh	Bharatiya Janata Party	
8	Ranchi	Ram Tahal Choudhary	Bharatiya Janata Party	
9	Jamshedpur	Bidyut Baran Mahato	Bharatiya Janata Party	
10	Singhbhum (ST)	Laxman Giluwa	Bharatiya Janata Party	
11	Khunti (ST)	Karia Munda	Bharatiya Janata Party	
12	Lohardaga (ST)	Sudarshan Bhagat	Bharatiya Janata Party	Minister of State, Social Justice and Empowerment (2014), Minister of State, Rural Development (2014–2016), Minister of State, Agriculture and Farmers' Welfare (2016–2017), Minister of State, Tribal Affairs (2017–2019)
13	Palamau (SC)	Vishnu Dayal Ram	Bharatiya Janata Party	
14	Hazaribagh	Jayant Sinha	Bharatiya Janata Party	Minister of State, Finance (2014–2016), Minister of State, Civil Aviation (2016–2019)

== Karnataka ==
Keys: BJP (15) INC (10) JD(S) (2) Vacant (1)

No.	Constituency	Member of Parliament	Party affiliation	Roles and responsibilities
1	Chikkodi	Prakash Hukkeri	Indian National Congress	
2	Belgaum	Suresh Angadi	Bharatiya Janata Party	
3	Bagalkot	P. C. Gaddigoudar	Bharatiya Janata Party	
4	Bijapur (SC)	Ramesh Jigajinagi	Bharatiya Janata Party	Minister of State, Drinking Water and Sanitation (2016–2019)
5	Gulbarga (SC)	Mallikarjun Kharge	Indian National Congress	Lok Sabha Leader, Indian National Congress, Chairman, Public Accounts Committee (2016–2019)
6	Raichur (ST)	B. V. Nayak	Indian National Congress	
7	Bidar	Bhagwanth Khuba	Bharatiya Janata Party	
8	Koppal	Karadi Sanganna Amarappa	Bharatiya Janata Party	
9	Bellary (ST)	B. Sriramulu (resigned on 18 May 2018)	Bharatiya Janata Party	
9	Bellary (ST)	V. S. Ugrappa (elected on 6 November 2018)	Indian National Congress	
10	Haveri	Shivkumar Chanabasappa Udasi	Bharatiya Janata Party	
11	Dharwad	Pralhad Joshi	Bharatiya Janata Party	
12	Uttara Kannada	Anantkumar Hegde	Bharatiya Janata Party	Minister of State, Skill Development and Entrepreneurship (2017–2019)
13	Davanagere	G. M. Siddeshwara	Bharatiya Janata Party	Minister of State, Civil Aviation (2014), Minister of State, Heavy Industries and Public Enterprises (2014–2016)
14	Shimoga	B. S. Yediyurappa (resigned on 21 May 2018)	Bharatiya Janata Party	
14	Shimoga	B. Y. Raghavendra (elected on 6 November 2018)	Bharatiya Janata Party	
15	Udupi Chikmagalur	Shobha Karandlaje	Bharatiya Janata Party	
16	Hassan	H. D. Deve Gowda	Janata Dal (Secular)	Lok Sabha Leader, Janata Dal (Secular)
17	Dakshina Kannada	Nalin Kumar Kateel	Bharatiya Janata Party	
18	Chitradurga (SC)	B. N. Chandrappa	Indian National Congress	
19	Tumkur	S. P. Muddahanumegowda	Indian National Congress	
20	Mandya	C. S. Puttaraju (resigned on 21 May 2018)	Janata Dal (Secular)	
20	Mandya	L. R. Shivarame Gowda (elected on 6 November 2018)	Janata Dal (Secular)	
21	Mysore	Pratap Simha	Bharatiya Janata Party	
22	Chamarajanagar (SC)	R. Dhruvanarayana	Indian National Congress	
23	Bangalore Rural	D. K. Suresh	Indian National Congress	
24	Bangalore North	D. V. Sadananda Gowda	Bharatiya Janata Party	Cabinet Minister, Railways (2014), Cabinet Minister, Law and Justice (2014–2016), Cabinet Minister, Statistics and Programme Implementation (2016–2019), Cabinet Minister, Chemicals and Fertilizers (2018–2019)
25	Bangalore Central	P. C. Mohan	Bharatiya Janata Party	
26	Bangalore South	Ananth Kumar (died on 12 November 2018)	Bharatiya Janata Party	Cabinet Minister, Chemicals and Fertilizers (2014–2018), Cabinet Minister, Parliamentary Affairs (2016–2018)
26	Bangalore South	Vacant from 12 November 2018		
27	Chikballapur	Veerappa Moily	Indian National Congress	Chairman, Standing Committee on Finance
28	Kolar (SC)	K. H. Muniyappa	Indian National Congress	

== Kerala ==
Keys: INC (7) CPI(M) (5) IUML (2) Independent (2) CPI (1) RSP (1) Vacant (2)

No.	Constituency	Member of Parliament	Party affiliation	Roles and responsibilities
1	Kasaragod	P. Karunakaran	Communist Party of India (Marxist)	Lok Sabha Leader, Communist Party of India (Marxist)
2	Kannur	P. K. Sreemathy	Communist Party of India (Marxist)	
3	Vatakara	Mullappally Ramachandran	Indian National Congress	
4	Wayanad	M. I. Shanavas (died on 21 November 2018)	Indian National Congress	
4	Wayanad	Vacant from 21 November 2018		
5	Kozhikode	M. K. Raghavan	Indian National Congress	
6	Malappuram	E. Ahamed (died on 1 February 2017)	Indian Union Muslim League	Lok Sabha Leader, Indian Union Muslim League (2014–2017)
6	Malappuram	P. K. Kunhalikutty (elected on 17 April 2017)	Indian Union Muslim League	
7	Ponnani	E. T. Muhammed Basheer	Indian Union Muslim League	Lok Sabha Leader, Indian Union Muslim League (2017–2019)
8	Palakkad	M. B. Rajesh	Communist Party of India (Marxist)	
9	Alathur (SC)	P. K. Biju	Communist Party of India (Marxist)	
10	Thrissur	C. N. Jayadevan	Communist Party of India	Lok Sabha Leader, Communist Party of India
11	Chalakudy	Innocent Vareed Thekkethala	Independent	
12	Ernakulam	K. V. Thomas	Indian National Congress	Chairman, Public Accounts Committee (2014–2016)
13	Idukki	Joice George	Independent	
14	Kottayam	Jose K. Mani (resigned on 14 June 2018)	Kerala Congress (Mani)	Lok Sabha Leader, Kerala Congress (Mani)
14	Kottayam	Vacant from 14 June 2018		
15	Alappuzha	K. C. Venugopal	Indian National Congress	
16	Mavelikara (SC)	Kodikkunnil Suresh	Indian National Congress	
17	Pathanamthitta	Anto Antony	Indian National Congress	
18	Kollam	N. K. Premachandran	Revolutionary Socialist Party	Lok Sabha Leader, Revolutionary Socialist Party
19	Attingal	Anirudhan Sampath	Communist Party of India (Marxist)	
20	Thiruvananthapuram	Shashi Tharoor	Indian National Congress	

== Madhya Pradesh ==
Keys: BJP (24) INC (2) Vacant (3)

No.	Constituency	Member of Parliament	Party affiliation	Roles and responsibilities
1	Morena	Anoop Mishra	Bharatiya Janata Party	
2	Bhind (SC)	Bhagirath Prasad	Bharatiya Janata Party	
3	Gwalior	Narendra Singh Tomar	Bharatiya Janata Party	Cabinet Minister, Labour and Employment (2014), Cabinet Minister, Mines (2014–2016, 2017–2019), Cabinet Minister, Steel (2014–2016), Cabinet Minister, Rural Development and Panchayati Raj (2016–2019), Cabinet Minister, Parliamentary Affairs (2018–2019)
4	Guna	Jyotiraditya Scindia	Indian National Congress	
5	Sagar	Laxmi Narayan Yadav	Bharatiya Janata Party	
6	Tikamgarh (SC)	Virendra Kumar Khatik	Bharatiya Janata Party	Minister of State, Women and Child Development, and Minority Affairs (2017–2019)
7	Damoh	Prahlad Singh Patel	Bharatiya Janata Party	
8	Khajuraho	Nagendra Singh (elected on 21 December 2018)	Bharatiya Janata Party	
8	Khajuraho	Vacant from 21 December 2018		
9	Satna	Ganesh Singh	Bharatiya Janata Party	
10	Rewa	Janardan Mishra	Bharatiya Janata Party	
11	Sidhi	Riti Pathak	Bharatiya Janata Party	
12	Shahdol (ST)	Dalpat Singh Paraste (died on 1 June 2016)	Bharatiya Janata Party	
12	Shahdol (ST)	Gyan Singh (elected on 22 November 2016)	Bharatiya Janata Party	
13	Jabalpur	Rakesh Singh	Bharatiya Janata Party	
14	Mandla (ST)	Faggan Singh Kulaste	Bharatiya Janata Party	Minister of State, Health and Family Welfare (2016–2017)
15	Balaghat	Bodh Singh Bhagat	Bharatiya Janata Party	
16	Chhindwara	Kamal Nath (resigned on 17 December 2018)	Indian National Congress	Pro tem Speaker, Lok Sabha
16	Chhindwara	Vacant from 17 December 2018		
17	Hoshangabad	Uday Pratap Singh	Bharatiya Janata Party	
18	Vidisha	Sushma Swaraj	Bharatiya Janata Party	Cabinet Minister, External Affairs (2014–2019), Cabinet Minister, Overseas Indian Affairs (2014–2016)
19	Bhopal	Alok Sanjar	Bharatiya Janata Party	
20	Rajgarh	Rodmal Nagar	Bharatiya Janata Party	
21	Dewas (SC)	Manohar Untwal (resigned on 21 December 2018)	Bharatiya Janata Party	
21	Dewas (SC)	Vacant from 21 December 2018		
22	Ujjain (SC)	Chintamani Malviya	Bharatiya Janata Party	
23	Mandsaur	Sudhir Gupta	Bharatiya Janata Party	
24	Ratlam (ST)	Dileep Singh Bhuria (died on 24 June 2015)	Bharatiya Janata Party	
24	Ratlam (ST)	Kantilal Bhuria (elected on 24 November 2015)	Indian National Congress	
25	Dhar (ST)	Savitri Thakur	Bharatiya Janata Party	
26	Indore	Sumitra Mahajan	Bharatiya Janata Party	Speaker of the Lok Sabha
27	Khargone (ST)	Subhash Patel	Bharatiya Janata Party	
28	Khandwa	Nandkumar Singh Chauhan	Bharatiya Janata Party	
29	Betul (ST)	Jyoti Dhurve	Bharatiya Janata Party	

== Maharashtra ==
Keys: BJP (22) SS (18) NCP (5) INC (2) SWP (1)

No.	Constituency	Member of Parliament	Party affiliation	Roles and responsibilities
1	Nandurbar (ST)	Heena Gavit	Bharatiya Janata Party	
2	Dhule	Subhash Bhamre	Bharatiya Janata Party	
3	Jalgaon	A. T. Patil	Bharatiya Janata Party	
4	Raver	Raksha Khadse	Bharatiya Janata Party	
5	Buldhana	Prataprao Ganpatrao Jadhav	Shiv Sena	
6	Akola	Sanjay Shamrao Dhotre	Bharatiya Janata Party	
7	Amravati (SC)	Anandrao Vithoba Adsul	Shiv Sena	
8	Wardha	Ramdas Tadas	Bharatiya Janata Party	
9	Ramtek (SC)	Krupal Balaji Tumane	Shiv Sena	
10	Nagpur	Nitin Gadkari	Bharatiya Janata Party	Cabinet Minister, Road Transport and Highways, and Shipping (2014–2019), Cabinet Minister, Rural Development, Panchayati Raj, and Drinking Water and Sanitation (2014), Cabinet Minister, Water Resources, River Development and Ganga Rejuvenation (2017–2019)
11	Bhandara–Gondiya	Nana Patole (resigned on 8 December 2017)	Bharatiya Janata Party	
11	Bhandara–Gondiya	Madhukar Kukde	Nationalist Congress Party	
12	Gadchiroli–Chimur (ST)	Ashok Nete	Bharatiya Janata Party	
13	Chandrapur	Hansraj Gangaram Ahir	Bharatiya Janata Party	Minister of State, Chemicals and Fertilizers (2014–2016), Minister of State, Home Affairs (2016–2019)
14	Yavatmal–Washim	Bhavana Gawali	Shiv Sena	
15	Hingoli	Rajeev Satav	Indian National Congress	
16	Nanded	Ashok Chavan	Indian National Congress	
17	Parbhani	Sanjay Haribhau Jadhav	Shiv Sena	
18	Jalna	Raosaheb Danve	Bharatiya Janata Party	Minister of State, Consumer Affairs, Food and Public Distribution (2014–2015)
19	Aurangabad	Chandrakant Khaire	Shiv Sena	
20	Dindori (ST)	Harischandra Devram Chavan	Bharatiya Janata Party	
21	Nashik	Hemant Godse	Shiv Sena	
22	Palghar (ST)	Chintaman Vanaga (died on 30 January 2018)	Bharatiya Janata Party	
22	Palghar (ST)	Rajendra Gavit (elected on 31 May 2018)	Bharatiya Janata Party	
23	Bhiwandi	Kapil Patil	Bharatiya Janata Party	
24	Kalyan	Shrikant Eknath Shinde	Shiv Sena	
25	Thane	Rajan Vichare	Shiv Sena	
26	Mumbai North	Gopal Shetty	Bharatiya Janata Party	
27	Mumbai North West	Gajanan Kirtikar	Shiv Sena	
28	Mumbai North East	Kirit Somaiya	Bharatiya Janata Party	
29	Mumbai North Central	Poonam Mahajan	Bharatiya Janata Party	
30	Mumbai South Central	Rahul Shewale	Shiv Sena	
31	Mumbai South	Arvind Sawant	Shiv Sena	
32	Raigad	Anant Geete	Shiv Sena	Lok Sabha Leader, Shiv Sena; Cabinet Minister, Heavy Industries and Public Enterprises
33	Maval	Shrirang Barne	Shiv Sena	
34	Pune	Anil Shirole	Bharatiya Janata Party	
35	Baramati	Supriya Sule	Nationalist Congress Party	Lok Sabha Leader, Nationalist Congress Party
36	Shirur	Shivajirao Adhalarao Patil	Shiv Sena	
37	Ahmednagar	Dilipkumar Gandhi	Bharatiya Janata Party	
38	Shirdi (SC)	Sadashiv Lokhande	Shiv Sena	
39	Beed	Gopinath Munde (died on 3 June 2014)	Bharatiya Janata Party	Cabinet Minister, Rural Development, Panchayati Raj, and Drinking Water and Sanitation (2014)
39	Beed	Pritam Munde (elected on 19 October 2014)	Bharatiya Janata Party	
40	Osmanabad	Ravindra Gaikwad	Shiv Sena	
41	Latur (SC)	Sunil Gaikwad	Bharatiya Janata Party	
42	Solapur (SC)	Sharad Bansode	Bharatiya Janata Party	
43	Madha	Vijaysinh Mohite–Patil	Nationalist Congress Party	
44	Sangli	Sanjaykaka Patil	Bharatiya Janata Party	
45	Satara	Udayanraje Bhosale	Nationalist Congress Party	
46	Ratnagiri–Sindhudurg	Vinayak Raut	Shiv Sena	
47	Kolhapur	Dhananjay Mahadik	Nationalist Congress Party	
48	Hatkanangle	Raju Shetti	Swabhimani Paksha	Lok Sabha Leader, Swabhimani Paksha

== Manipur ==
Keys: INC (2)

No.	Constituency	Member of Parliament	Party affiliation	Roles and responsibilities
1	Inner Manipur	Thokchom Meinya	Indian National Congress	
2	Outer Manipur (ST)	Thangso Baite	Indian National Congress	

== Meghalaya ==
Keys: INC (1) Vacant (1)

No.	Constituency	Member of Parliament	Party affiliation	Roles and responsibilities
1	Shillong (ST)	Vincent Pala	Indian National Congress	
2	Tura (ST)	P. A. Sangma (died on 4 March 2016)	National People's Party	Lok Sabha Leader, National People's Party (2014–2016)
2	Tura (ST)	Conrad Sangma (elected on 19 May 2016 and resigned on 4 September 2018)	National People's Party	Lok Sabha Leader, National People's Party (2016–2018)
2	Tura (ST)	Vacant from 4 September 2018		

== Mizoram ==
Keys: INC (1)

No.	Constituency	Member of Parliament	Party affiliation	Roles and responsibilities
1	Mizoram (ST)	C. L. Ruala	Indian National Congress	

== Nagaland ==
Keys: NDPP (1)

No.	Constituency	Member of Parliament	Party affiliation	Roles and responsibilities
1	Nagaland	Neiphiu Rio (resigned on 22 February 2018)	Naga People's Front	Lok Sabha Leader, Naga People's Front
1	Nagaland	Tokheho Yepthomi (elected on 31 May 2018)	Nationalist Democratic Progressive Party	Lok Sabha Leader, Nationalist Democratic Progressive Party

== Odisha ==
Keys: BJD (18) BJP (1) Vacant (2)

No.	Constituency	Member of Parliament	Party affiliation	Roles and responsibilities
1	Bargarh	Prabhas Kumar Singh	Biju Janata Dal	
2	Sundargarh (ST)	Jual Oram	Bharatiya Janata Party	Cabinet Minister, Tribal Affairs
3	Sambalpur	Nagendra Kumar Pradhan	Biju Janata Dal	
4	Keonjhar (ST)	Sakuntala Laguri	Biju Janata Dal	
5	Mayurbhanj (ST)	Rama Chandra Hansdah	Biju Janata Dal	
6	Balasore	Rabindra Kumar Jena	Biju Janata Dal	
7	Bhadrak (SC)	Arjun Charan Sethi	Biju Janata Dal	
8	Jajpur (SC)	Rita Tarai	Biju Janata Dal	
9	Dhenkanal	Tathagata Satpathy	Biju Janata Dal	
10	Bolangir	Kalikesh Narayan Singh Deo	Biju Janata Dal	
11	Kalahandi	Arka Keshari Deo	Biju Janata Dal	
12	Nabarangpur (ST)	Balabhadra Majhi	Biju Janata Dal	
13	Kandhamal	Hemendra Chandra Singh (died on 5 September 2014)	Biju Janata Dal	
13	Kandhamal	Pratyusha Rajeshwari Singh (elected on 19 October 2014)	Biju Janata Dal	
14	Cuttack	Bhartruhari Mahtab	Biju Janata Dal	Lok Sabha Leader, Biju Janata Dal
15	Kendrapara	Baijayant Panda (resigned on 18 July 2018)	Biju Janata Dal	
15	Kendrapara	Vacant from 18 July 2018		
16	Jagatsinghpur (SC)	Kulamani Samal	Biju Janata Dal	
17	Puri	Pinaki Misra	Biju Janata Dal	
18	Bhubaneswar	Prasanna Kumar Patasani	Biju Janata Dal	
19	Aska	Ladu Kishore Swain (died on 6 February 2019)	Biju Janata Dal	
19	Aska	Vacant from 6 February 2019		
20	Berhampur	Siddhanta Mahapatra	Biju Janata Dal	
21	Koraput (ST)	Jhina Hikaka	Biju Janata Dal	

== Punjab ==
Keys: SAD (4) AAP (4) INC (4) BJP (1)

No.	Constituency	Member of Parliament	Party affiliation	Roles and responsibilities
1	Gurdaspur	Vinod Khanna (died on 27 April 2017)	Bharatiya Janata Party	
1	Gurdaspur	Sunil Jakhar (elected on 15 October 2017)	Indian National Congress	
2	Amritsar	Amarinder Singh (resigned on 23 November 2016)	Indian National Congress	
2	Amritsar	Gurjeet Singh Aujla (elected on 11 March 2017)	Indian National Congress	
3	Khadoor Sahib	Ranjit Singh Brahmpura	Shiromani Akali Dal	Lok Sabha Leader, Shiromani Akali Dal
4	Jalandhar (SC)	Santokh Singh Chaudhary	Indian National Congress	
5	Hoshiarpur (SC)	Vijay Sampla	Bharatiya Janata Party	Minister of State, Social Justice and Empowerment (2014–2019)
6	Anandpur Sahib	Prem Singh Chandumajra	Shiromani Akali Dal	
7	Ludhiana	Ravneet Singh Bittu	Indian National Congress	
8	Fatehgarh Sahib (SC)	Harinder Singh Khalsa	Aam Aadmi Party	
9	Faridkot (SC)	Sadhu Singh	Aam Aadmi Party	
10	Ferozepur	Sher Singh Ghubaya	Shiromani Akali Dal	
11	Bathinda	Harsimrat Kaur Badal	Shiromani Akali Dal	Cabinet Minister, Food Processing Industries
12	Sangrur	Bhagwant Mann	Aam Aadmi Party	Lok Sabha Leader, Aam Aadmi Party
13	Patiala	Dharamvir Gandhi	Aam Aadmi Party	

== Rajasthan ==
Keys: BJP (22) INC (1) Vacant (2)

No.	Constituency	Member of Parliament	Party affiliation	Roles and responsibilities
1	Ganganagar (SC)	Nihalchand	Bharatiya Janata Party	Minister of State, Chemicals and Fertilizers (2014), Minister of State, Panchayati Raj (2014–2016)
2	Bikaner (SC)	Arjun Ram Meghwal	Bharatiya Janata Party	Minister of State, Finance and Corporate Affairs (2016–2017), Minister of State, Parliamentary Affairs, and Water Resources, River Development and Ganga Rejuvenation (2017–2019)
3	Churu	Rahul Kaswan	Bharatiya Janata Party	
4	Jhunjhunu	Santosh Ahlawat	Bharatiya Janata Party	
5	Sikar	Sumedhanand Saraswati	Bharatiya Janata Party	
6	Jaipur Rural	Rajyavardhan Singh Rathore	Bharatiya Janata Party	Minister of State, Information and Broadcasting (2014–2018), Minister of State (I/C), Youth Affairs and Sports (2017–2019), Minister of State (I/C), Information and Broadcasting (2018–2019)
7	Jaipur	Ramcharan Bohara	Bharatiya Janata Party	
8	Alwar	Mahant Chandnath (died on 17 September 2017)	Bharatiya Janata Party	
8	Alwar	Karan Singh Yadav (elected on 1 February 2018)	Indian National Congress	
9	Bharatpur (SC)	Bahadur Singh Koli	Bharatiya Janata Party	
10	Karauli–Dholpur (SC)	Manoj Rajoria	Bharatiya Janata Party	
11	Dausa (ST)	Harish Meena (resigned on 24 December 2018)	Bharatiya Janata Party	
11	Dausa (ST)	Vacant from 24 December 2018		
12	Tonk–Sawai Madhopur	Sukhbir Singh Jaunapuria	Bharatiya Janata Party	
13	Ajmer	Sanwar Lal Jat (died on 9 August 2017)	Bharatiya Janata Party	Minister of State, Water Resources, River Development and Ganga Rejuvenation (2014–2016)
13	Ajmer	Raghu Sharma (elected on 1 February 2018 and resigned on 21 December 2018)	Indian National Congress	
14	Nagaur	C. R. Chaudhary	Bharatiya Janata Party	Minister of State, Consumer Affairs, Food and Public Distribution (2016–2019), Minister of State, Commerce and Industry (2017–2019)
15	Pali	P. P. Chaudhary	Bharatiya Janata Party	Minister of State, Law and Justice (2016–2019), Minister of State, Electronics and Information Technology (2016–2017), Minister of State, Corporate Affairs (2017–2019)
16	Jodhpur	Gajendra Singh Shekhawat	Bharatiya Janata Party	Minister of State, Agriculture and Farmers' Welfare (2017–2019)
17	Barmer	Sona Ram	Bharatiya Janata Party	
18	Jalore	Devji Patel	Bharatiya Janata Party	
19	Udaipur (ST)	Arjunlal Meena	Bharatiya Janata Party	
20	Banswara (ST)	Manshankar Ninama	Bharatiya Janata Party	
21	Chittorgarh	Chandra Prakash Joshi	Bharatiya Janata Party	
22	Rajsamand	Hariom Singh Rathore	Bharatiya Janata Party	
23	Bhilwara	Subhash Chandra Baheria	Bharatiya Janata Party	
24	Kota	Om Birla	Bharatiya Janata Party	
25	Jhalawar–Baran	Dushyant Singh	Bharatiya Janata Party	

== Sikkim ==
Keys: SDF (1)

No.	Constituency	Member of Parliament	Party affiliation	Roles and responsibilities
1	Sikkim	Prem Das Rai	Sikkim Democratic Front	Lok Sabha Leader, Sikkim Democratic Front

== Tamil Nadu ==
AIADMK (36) BJP (1) PMK (1) Vacant (1)
Constituency			Elected member	Political party	Alliance	Remarks
No.	Name	Reservation	Elected member	Political party	Alliance	Remarks
1	Thiruvallur	SC	P. Venugopal	All India Anna Dravida Munnetra Kazhagam	AIADMK+	Lok Sabha Leader of the party
2	Chennai North	General	T. G. Venkatesh Babu	All India Anna Dravida Munnetra Kazhagam	AIADMK+	
3	Chennai South	General	J. Jayavardhan	All India Anna Dravida Munnetra Kazhagam	AIADMK+	
4	Chennai Central	General	S. R. Vijayakumar	All India Anna Dravida Munnetra Kazhagam	AIADMK+	
5	Sriperumbudur	General	K. N. Thiru Ramachandran	All India Anna Dravida Munnetra Kazhagam	AIADMK+	
6	Kancheepuram	SC	K. Maragatham	All India Anna Dravida Munnetra Kazhagam	AIADMK+	
7	Arakkonam	General	G. Hari	All India Anna Dravida Munnetra Kazhagam	AIADMK+	
8	Vellore	General	B. Senguttuvan	All India Anna Dravida Munnetra Kazhagam	AIADMK+	
9	Krishnagiri	General	K. Ashok Kumar	All India Anna Dravida Munnetra Kazhagam	AIADMK+	
10	Dharmapuri	General	Anbumani Ramadoss	Pattali Makkal Katchi	NDA	Lok Sabha Leader of the party
11	Tiruvannamalai	General	R. Vanaroja	All India Anna Dravida Munnetra Kazhagam	AIADMK+	
12	Arani	General	V. Elumalai	All India Anna Dravida Munnetra Kazhagam	AIADMK+	
13	Viluppuram	SC	S. Rajendran	All India Anna Dravida Munnetra Kazhagam	AIADMK+	Died on 23 February 2019
13	Viluppuram	SC	Vacant from 23 February 2019			
14	Kallakurichi	General	K. Kamaraj	All India Anna Dravida Munnetra Kazhagam	AIADMK+	
15	Salem	General	V. Pannerselvam	All India Anna Dravida Munnetra Kazhagam	AIADMK+	
16	Namakkal	General	P. R. Sundaram	All India Anna Dravida Munnetra Kazhagam	AIADMK+	
17	Erode	General	S. Selvakumara Chinnayan	All India Anna Dravida Munnetra Kazhagam	AIADMK+	
18	Tiruppur	General	V. Sathyabama	All India Anna Dravida Munnetra Kazhagam	AIADMK+	
19	Nilgiris	SC	C. Gopalakrishnan	All India Anna Dravida Munnetra Kazhagam	AIADMK+	
20	Coimbatore	General	P. Nagarajan	All India Anna Dravida Munnetra Kazhagam	AIADMK+	
21	Pollachi	General	C. Mahendran	All India Anna Dravida Munnetra Kazhagam	AIADMK+	
22	Dindigul	General	M. Udhayakumar	All India Anna Dravida Munnetra Kazhagam	AIADMK+	
23	Karur	General	M. Thambidurai	All India Anna Dravida Munnetra Kazhagam	AIADMK+	Deputy Speaker of the Lok Sabha
24	Tiruchirappalli	General	P. Kumar	All India Anna Dravida Munnetra Kazhagam	AIADMK+	
25	Perambalur	General	R. P. Marutharajaa	All India Anna Dravida Munnetra Kazhagam	AIADMK+	
26	Cuddalore	General	A. Arunmozhithevan	All India Anna Dravida Munnetra Kazhagam	AIADMK+	
27	Chidambaram	SC	M. Chandrakasi	All India Anna Dravida Munnetra Kazhagam	AIADMK+	
28	Mayiladuthurai	General	R. K. Bharathi Mohan	All India Anna Dravida Munnetra Kazhagam	AIADMK+	
29	Nagapattinam	SC	K. Gopal	All India Anna Dravida Munnetra Kazhagam	AIADMK+	
30	Thanjavur	General	K. Parasuraman	All India Anna Dravida Munnetra Kazhagam	AIADMK+	
31	Sivaganga	General	P. R. Senthilnathan	All India Anna Dravida Munnetra Kazhagam	AIADMK+	
32	Madurai	General	R. Gopalakrishnan	All India Anna Dravida Munnetra Kazhagam	AIADMK+	
33	Theni	General	R. Parthipan	All India Anna Dravida Munnetra Kazhagam	AIADMK+	
34	Virudhunagar	General	T. Radhakrishnan	All India Anna Dravida Munnetra Kazhagam	AIADMK+	
35	Ramanathapuram	General	A. Anwhar Raajhaa	All India Anna Dravida Munnetra Kazhagam	AIADMK+	
36	Thoothukkudi	General	J. Jayasingh Thiyagaraj Natterjee	All India Anna Dravida Munnetra Kazhagam	AIADMK+	
37	Tenkasi	SC	M. Vasanthi	All India Anna Dravida Munnetra Kazhagam	AIADMK+	
38	Tirunelveli	General	K. R. P. Prabakaran	All India Anna Dravida Munnetra Kazhagam	AIADMK+	
39	Kanniyakumari	General	Pon. Radhakrishnan	Bharatiya Janata Party	NDA	Minister of State for Heavy Industries and Public Enterprises (2014)
39	Kanniyakumari	General	Pon. Radhakrishnan	Bharatiya Janata Party	NDA	Minister of State for Road Transport and Highways (2014–17)
39	Kanniyakumari	General	Pon. Radhakrishnan	Bharatiya Janata Party	NDA	Minister of State for Shipping (2014–19)
39	Kanniyakumari	General	Pon. Radhakrishnan	Bharatiya Janata Party	NDA	Minister of State for Finance (2017–19)

== Telangana ==
Keys: TRS (10) INC (2) BJP (1) AIMIM (1) YSRCP (1) Vacant (2)

No.	Constituency	Member of Parliament	Party affiliation	Roles and responsibilities
1	Adilabad (ST)	G. Nagesh	Telangana Rashtra Samithi	
2	Peddapalle (SC)	Balka Suman (resigned on 17 December 2018)	Telangana Rashtra Samithi	
2	Peddapalle (SC)	Vacant from 17 December 2018		
3	Karimnagar	Vinod Kumar Boianapalli	Telangana Rashtra Samithi	
4	Nizamabad	K. Kavitha	Telangana Rashtra Samithi	
5	Zahirabad	B. B. Patil	Telangana Rashtra Samithi	
6	Medak	K. Chandrashekar Rao (resigned on 27 May 2014)	Telangana Rashtra Samithi	
6	Medak	Kotha Prabhakar Reddy (elected on 16 September 2014)	Telangana Rashtra Samithi	
7	Malkajgiri	Malla Reddy (resigned on 14 December 2018)	Telugu Desam Party	
7	Malkajgiri	Vacant from 14 December 2018		
8	Secunderabad	Bandaru Dattatreya	Bharatiya Janata Party	Minister of State (I/C), Labour and Employment (2014–2017)
9	Hyderabad	Asaduddin Owaisi	All India Majlis-E-Ittehadul Muslimeen	Lok Sabha Leader, All India Majlis-E-Ittehadul Muslimeen
10	Chevella	Konda Vishweshwar Reddy	Telangana Rashtra Samithi	
11	Mahbubnagar	A. P. Jithender Reddy	Telangana Rashtra Samithi	Lok Sabha Leader, Telangana Rashtra Samithi
12	Nagarkurnool (SC)	Nandi Yellaiah	Indian National Congress	
13	Nalgonda	Gutha Sukender Reddy	Indian National Congress	
14	Bhongir	Boora Narsaiah Goud	Telangana Rashtra Samithi	
15	Warangal (SC)	Kadiyam Srihari (resigned on 11 June 2015)	Telangana Rashtra Samithi	
15	Warangal (SC)	Pasunuri Dayakar (elected on 24 November 2015)	Telangana Rashtra Samithi	
16	Mahabubabad (ST)	A. Sitaram Naik	Telangana Rashtra Samithi	
17	Khammam	Ponguleti Srinivas Reddy	YSR Congress Party	

== Tripura ==
Keys: CPI(M) (2)

No.	Constituency	Member of Parliament	Party affiliation	Roles and responsibilities
1	Tripura West	Sankar Prasad Datta	Communist Party of India	
2	Tripura East (ST)	Jitendra Choudhury	Communist Party of India	

== Uttar Pradesh ==
Keys: BJP (68) SP (7) AD (2) INC (2) RLD (1)

No.	Constituency	Member of Parliament	Party affiliation	Roles and responsibilities
1	Saharanpur	Raghav Lakhanpal	Bharatiya Janata Party	
2	Kairana	Hukum Singh (died on 3 February 2018)	Bharatiya Janata Party	
2	Kairana	Begum Tabassum Hasan (elected on 31 May 2018)	Rashtriya Lok Dal	Lok Sabha Leader, Rashtriya Lok Dal
3	Muzaffarnagar	Sanjeev Balyan	Bharatiya Janata Party	
4	Bijnor	Kunwar Bhartendra Singh	Bharatiya Janata Party	
5	Nagina (SC)	Yashwant Singh	Bharatiya Janata Party	
6	Moradabad	Kunwar Sarvesh Kumar Singh	Bharatiya Janata Party	
7	Rampur	Naipal Singh	Bharatiya Janata Party	
8	Sambhal	Satyapal Singh Saini	Bharatiya Janata Party	
9	Amroha	Kanwar Singh Tanwar	Bharatiya Janata Party	
10	Meerut	Rajendra Agrawal	Bharatiya Janata Party	
11	Baghpat	Satya Pal Singh	Bharatiya Janata Party	Minister of State, Human Resource Development, and Water Resources, River Development and Ganga Rejuvenation (2017–2019)
12	Ghaziabad	Vijay Kumar Singh	Bharatiya Janata Party	Minister of State (I/C), Development of North Eastern Region (2014), Minister of State (I/C), Statistics and Programme Implementation (2014–2016), Minister of State, External Affairs (2014–2019)
13	Gautam Buddh Nagar	Mahesh Sharma	Bharatiya Janata Party	Minister of State (I/C), Culture (2014–2019), Minister of State (I/C), Tourism (2014–2017), Minister of State, Environment, Forest and Climate Change (2017–2019)
14	Bulandshahr (SC)	Bhola Singh	Bharatiya Janata Party	
15	Aligarh	Satish Kumar Gautam	Bharatiya Janata Party	
16	Hathras (SC)	Rajesh Diwakar	Bharatiya Janata Party	
17	Mathura	Hema Malini	Bharatiya Janata Party	
18	Agra (SC)	Ram Shankar Katheria	Bharatiya Janata Party	Minister of State, Human Resource Development (2014–2016)
19	Fatehpur Sikri	Babulal Chaudhary	Bharatiya Janata Party	
20	Firozabad	Akshay Yadav	Samajwadi Party	
21	Mainpuri	Mulayam Singh Yadav (resigned on 29 May 2014)	Samajwadi Party	
21	Mainpuri	Tej Pratap Singh Yadav (elected on 16 September 2014)	Samajwadi Party	
22	Etah	Rajveer Singh	Bharatiya Janata Party	
23	Badaun	Dharmendra Yadav	Samajwadi Party	
24	Aonla	Dharmendra Kashyap	Bharatiya Janata Party	
25	Bareilly	Santosh Kumar Gangwar	Bharatiya Janata Party	Minister of State (I/C), Textiles (2014–2016), Minister of State, Finance (2016–2017), Minister of State (I/C), Labour and Employment (2017–2019)
26	Pilibhit	Maneka Gandhi	Bharatiya Janata Party	Cabinet Minister, Women and Child Development
27	Shahjahanpur (SC)	Krishna Raj	Bharatiya Janata Party	Minister of State, Women and Child Development (2016–2017), Minister of State, Agriculture and Farmers' Welfare (2017–2019)
28	Kheri	Ajay Kumar Mishra	Bharatiya Janata Party	
29	Dhaurahra	Rekha Verma	Bharatiya Janata Party	
30	Sitapur	Rajesh Verma	Bharatiya Janata Party	
31	Hardoi (SC)	Anshul Verma	Bharatiya Janata Party	
32	Misrikh (SC)	Anju Bala	Bharatiya Janata Party	
33	Unnao	Sakshi Maharaj	Bharatiya Janata Party	
34	Mohanlalganj (SC)	Kaushal Kishore	Bharatiya Janata Party	
35	Lucknow	Rajnath Singh	Bharatiya Janata Party	Cabinet Minister, Home Affairs and Deputy Leader of the House
36	Rae Bareli	Sonia Gandhi	Indian National Congress	Parliamentary Party Leader, Indian National Congress
37	Amethi	Rahul Gandhi	Indian National Congress	
38	Sultanpur	Varun Gandhi	Bharatiya Janata Party	
39	Pratapgarh	Harivansh Singh	Apna Dal	
40	Farrukhabad	Mukesh Rajput	Bharatiya Janata Party	
41	Etawah (SC)	Ashok Kumar Doharey	Bharatiya Janata Party	
42	Kannauj	Dimple Yadav	Samajwadi Party	
43	Kanpur	Murli Manohar Joshi	Bharatiya Janata Party	Chairman, Estimates Committee
44	Akbarpur	Devendra Singh (Bhole Singh)	Bharatiya Janata Party	
45	Jalaun (SC)	Bhanu Pratap Singh Verma	Bharatiya Janata Party	
46	Jhansi	Uma Bharti	Bharatiya Janata Party	Cabinet Minister, Water Resources, River Development and Ganga Rejuvenation (2014–2017), Cabinet Minister, Drinking Water and Sanitation (2017–2019)
47	Hamirpur	Pushpendra Singh Chandel	Bharatiya Janata Party	
48	Banda	Bhairon Prasad Mishra	Bharatiya Janata Party	
49	Fatehpur	Niranjan Jyoti	Bharatiya Janata Party	Minister of State, Food Processing Industries (2014–2019)
50	Kaushambi (SC)	Vinod Kumar Sonkar	Bharatiya Janata Party	
51	Phulpur	Keshav Prasad Maurya (resigned on 21 September 2017)	Bharatiya Janata Party	
51	Phulpur	Nagendra Pratap Singh Patel (elected on 14 March 2018)	Samajwadi Party	
52	Allahabad	Shyama Charan Gupta	Bharatiya Janata Party	
53	Barabanki (SC)	Priyanka Singh Rawat	Bharatiya Janata Party	
54	Faizabad	Lallu Singh	Bharatiya Janata Party	
55	Ambedkar Nagar	Hari Om Pandey	Bharatiya Janata Party	
56	Bahraich (SC)	Savitri Bai Phule	Bharatiya Janata Party	
57	Kaiserganj	Brij Bhushan Sharan Singh	Bharatiya Janata Party	
58	Shrawasti	Daddan Mishra	Bharatiya Janata Party	
59	Gonda	Kirti Vardhan Singh	Bharatiya Janata Party	
60	Domariyaganj	Jagdambika Pal	Bharatiya Janata Party	
61	Basti	Harish Dwivedi	Bharatiya Janata Party	
62	Sant Kabir Nagar	Sharad Tripathi	Bharatiya Janata Party	
63	Maharajganj	Pankaj Chaudhary	Bharatiya Janata Party	
64	Gorakhpur	Yogi Adityanath (resigned on 21 September 2017)	Bharatiya Janata Party	
64	Gorakhpur	Praveen Kumar Nishad (elected on 14 March 2018)	Samajwadi Party	
65	Kushi Nagar	Rajesh Pandey	Bharatiya Janata Party	
66	Deoria	Kalraj Mishra	Bharatiya Janata Party	Cabinet Minister, Micro, Small and Medium Enterprises (2014–2017), Chairman, Standing Committee on Defence (2017–2019)
67	Bansgaon (SC)	Kamlesh Paswan	Bharatiya Janata Party	
68	Lalganj (SC)	Neelam Sonkar	Bharatiya Janata Party	
69	Azamgarh	Mulayam Singh Yadav	Samajwadi Party	Lok Sabha Leader, Samajwadi Party
70	Ghosi	Harinarayan Rajbhar	Bharatiya Janata Party	
71	Salempur	Ravindra Kushawaha	Bharatiya Janata Party	
72	Ballia	Bharat Singh	Bharatiya Janata Party	
73	Jaunpur	Krishna Pratap	Bharatiya Janata Party	
74	Machhlishahr (SC)	Ram Charitra Nishad	Bharatiya Janata Party	
75	Ghazipur	Manoj Sinha	Bharatiya Janata Party	Minister of State, Railways (2014–2019), Minister of State (I/C), Communications (2016–2019)
76	Chandauli	Mahendra Nath Pandey	Bharatiya Janata Party	Minister of State, Human Resource Development (2016–2017)
77	Varanasi	Narendra Modi	Bharatiya Janata Party	Prime Minister and Leader of the House, Lok Sabha Leader, Bharatiya Janata Party
78	Bhadohi	Virendra Singh Mast	Bharatiya Janata Party	
79	Mirzapur	Anupriya Singh Patel	Apna Dal	Lok Sabha Leader, Apna Dal, Minister of State, Health and Family Welfare (2016–2019)
80	Robertsganj (SC)	Chhotelal	Bharatiya Janata Party	

== Uttarakhand ==
Keys: BJP (5)

No.	Constituency	Member of Parliament	Party affiliation	Roles and responsibilities
1	Tehri Garhwal	Mala Rajya Laxmi Shah	Bharatiya Janata Party	
2	Garhwal	B. C. Khanduri	Bharatiya Janata Party	Chairman, Standing Committee on Defence (2014–2017)
3	Almora (SC)	Ajay Tamta	Bharatiya Janata Party	Minister of State, Textiles (2016–2019)
4	Nainital–Udhamsingh Nagar	Bhagat Singh Koshyari	Bharatiya Janata Party	
5	Haridwar	Ramesh Pokhriyal	Bharatiya Janata Party	

== West Bengal ==
Keys: TMC (33) INC (4) BJP (2) CPI(M) (2) Vacant (1)

No.	Constituency	Member of Parliament	Party affiliation	Roles and responsibilities
1	Cooch Behar (SC)	Renuka Sinha (died on 17 August 2016)	Trinamool Congress	
1	Cooch Behar (SC)	Partha Pratim Roy (elected on 22 November 2016)	Trinamool Congress	
2	Alipurduars (ST)	Dasrath Tirkey	Trinamool Congress	
3	Jalpaiguri (SC)	Bijoy Chandra Barman	Trinamool Congress	
4	Darjeeling	S. S. Ahluwalia	Bharatiya Janata Party	Minister of State, Agriculture and Farmers' Welfare, and Parliamentary Affairs (2016–2017), Minister of State, Drinking Water and Sanitation (2017–2018), Minister of State, Electronics and Information Technology (2017–2018)
5	Raiganj	Mohammed Salim	Communist Party of India (Marxist)	
6	Balurghat	Arpita Ghosh	Trinamool Congress	
7	Maldaha Uttar	Mausam Noor	Indian National Congress	
8	Maldaha Dakshin	Abu Hasem Khan Choudhury	Indian National Congress	
9	Jangipur	Abhijit Mukherjee	Indian National Congress	
10	Baharampur	Adhir Ranjan Chowdhury	Indian National Congress	
11	Murshidabad	Badaruddoza Khan	Communist Party of India (Marxist)	
12	Krishnanagar	Tapas Paul	Trinamool Congress	
13	Ranaghat (SC)	Tapas Mandal	Trinamool Congress	
14	Bangaon (SC)	Kapil Krishna Thakur (died on 13 October 2014)	Trinamool Congress	
14	Bangaon (SC)	Mamata Thakur (elected on 16 February 2015)	Trinamool Congress	
15	Barrackpore	Dinesh Trivedi	Trinamool Congress	
16	Dum Dum	Saugata Roy	Trinamool Congress	
17	Barasat	Kakali Ghosh Dastidar	Trinamool Congress	
18	Basirhat	Idris Ali	Trinamool Congress	
19	Jaynagar (SC)	Pratima Mondal	Trinamool Congress	
20	Mathurapur (SC)	Choudhury Mohan Jatua	Trinamool Congress	Minister of State, Information and Broadcasting (2009–2012)
21	Diamond Harbour	Abhishek Banerjee	Trinamool Congress	
22	Jadavpur	Sugata Bose (resigned on 12 March 2019)	Trinamool Congress	
22	Jadavpur	Vacant from 12 March 2019		
23	Kolkata Dakshin	Subrata Bakshi	Trinamool Congress	
24	Kolkata Uttar	Sudip Bandyopadhyay	Trinamool Congress	Lok Sabha Leader, Trinamool Congress
25	Howrah	Prasun Banerjee	Trinamool Congress	
26	Uluberia	Sultan Ahmed (died on 4 September 2017)	Trinamool Congress	
26	Uluberia	Sajda Ahmed (elected on 1 February 2018)	Trinamool Congress	
27	Serampore	Kalyan Banerjee	Trinamool Congress	
28	Hooghly	Ratna De (Nag)	Trinamool Congress	
29	Arambagh (SC)	Afrin Ali	Trinamool Congress	
30	Tamluk	Suvendu Adhikari (resigned on 19 May 2016)	Trinamool Congress	
30	Tamluk	Dibyendu Adhikari (elected on 22 November 2016)	Trinamool Congress	
31	Kanthi	Sisir Adhikari	Trinamool Congress	
32	Ghatal	Deepak Adhikari (Dev)	Trinamool Congress	
33	Jhargram (ST)	Uma Saren	Trinamool Congress	
34	Medinipur	Sandhya Roy	Trinamool Congress	
35	Purulia	Mriganka Mahato	Trinamool Congress	
36	Bankura	Moon Moon Sen	Trinamool Congress	
37	Bishnupur (SC)	Saumitra Khan	Trinamool Congress	
38	Bardhaman Purba (SC)	Sunil Kumar Mandal	Trinamool Congress	
39	Burdwan–Durgapur	Mamtaz Sanghamita	Trinamool Congress	
40	Asansol	Babul Supriyo	Bharatiya Janata Party	Minister of State, Urban Development, and Housing and Urban Poverty Alleviation (2014–2016), Minister of State, Heavy Industries and Public Enterprises (2016–2019)
41	Bolpur (SC)	Anupam Hazra	Trinamool Congress	
42	Birbhum	Satabdi Roy	Trinamool Congress	

== Andaman and Nicobar Islands ==
Keys: BJP (1)

No.	Constituency	Member of Parliament	Party affiliation	Roles and responsibilities
1	Andaman and Nicobar Islands	Bishnu Pada Ray	Bharatiya Janata Party	

== Chandigarh ==
Keys: BJP (1)

No.	Constituency	Member of Parliament	Party affiliation	Roles and responsibilities
1	Chandigarh	Kirron Kher	Bharatiya Janata Party	

== Dadra and Nagar Haveli ==
Keys: BJP (1)

No.	Constituency	Member of Parliament	Party affiliation	Roles and responsibilities
1	Dadra and Nagar Haveli (ST)	Natubhai Gomanbhai Patel	Bharatiya Janata Party	

== Daman and Diu ==
Keys: BJP (1)

No.	Constituency	Member of Parliament	Party affiliation	Roles and responsibilities
1	Daman and Diu	Lalubhai Patel	Bharatiya Janata Party	

== National Capital Territory of Delhi ==
Keys: BJP (7)

No.	Constituency	Member of Parliament	Party affiliation	Roles and responsibilities
1	Chandni Chowk	Harsh Vardhan	Bharatiya Janata Party	Cabinet Minister, Health and Family Welfare (2014), Cabinet Minister, Science and Technology, and Earth Sciences (2014–2019), Cabinet Minister, Environment, Forest and Climate Change (2017–2019)
2	North East Delhi	Manoj Tiwari	Bharatiya Janata Party	
3	East Delhi	Maheish Girri	Bharatiya Janata Party	
4	New Delhi	Meenakshi Lekhi	Bharatiya Janata Party	
5	North West Delhi (SC)	Udit Raj	Bharatiya Janata Party	
6	West Delhi	Parvesh Verma	Bharatiya Janata Party	
7	South Delhi	Ramesh Bidhuri	Bharatiya Janata Party	

== Lakshadweep ==
Keys: NCP (1)

No.	Constituency	Member of Parliament	Party affiliation	Roles and responsibilities
1	Lakshadweep (ST)	Mohammed Faizal P. P.	Nationalist Congress Party	

== Puducherry ==
Keys: AINRC (1)

No.	Constituency	Member of Parliament	Party affiliation	Roles and responsibilities
1	Puducherry	R. Radhakrishnan	All India N.R. Congress	Lok Sabha Leader, All India N.R. Congress

== Nominated ==
Keys: BJP (2)

No.	Constituency	Member of Parliament	Party affiliation	Roles and responsibilities
1	Anglo-Indian Community	George Baker	Bharatiya Janata Party	
2	Anglo-Indian Community	Richard Hay	Bharatiya Janata Party	

== See also ==
- Member of parliament, Lok Sabha
- List of members of the 15th Lok Sabha
- List of members of the 17th Lok Sabha
