= Dayanidhi Maran =

Indian politician (born 1966)

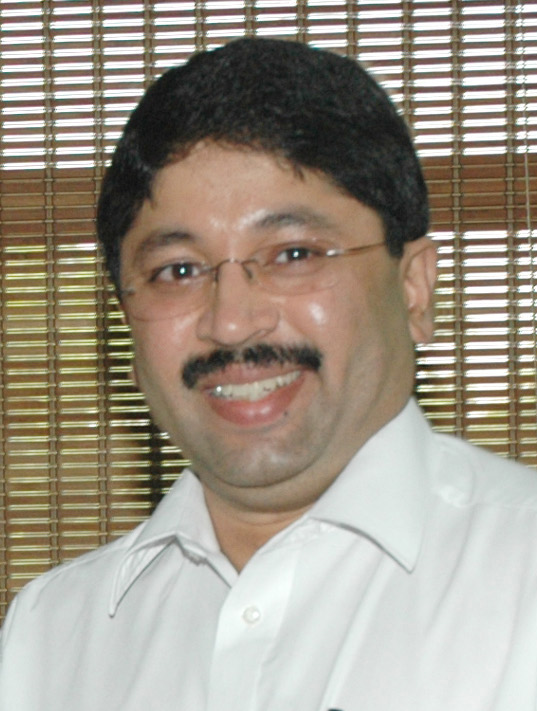

Member of Parliament, Lok Sabha
- Incumbent
- Assumed office 23 May 2019
- Preceded by: S. R. Vijayakumar
- Constituency: Chennai Central
- In office 16 May 2004 – 16 May 2014
- Preceded by: Murasoli Maran
- Succeeded by: S. R. Vijayakumar
- Constituency: Chennai Central

Minister of Communications and Information Technology
- In office 22 May 2004 – 16 May 2007
- Prime Minister: Manmohan Singh
- Preceded by: Arun Shourie
- Succeeded by: A. Raja

Minister of Textiles
- In office 28 May 2009 – 12 July 2011
- Prime Minister: Manmohan Singh
- Preceded by: Shankersinh Vaghela
- Succeeded by: Anand Sharma

Personal details
- Born: 5 December 1966 (age 59) Kumbakonam, Madras State, India (now in Tamil Nadu, India)
- Party: Dravida Munnetra Kazhagam
- Spouse: Priya Maran
- Children: 2
- Parent(s): Murasoli Maran; Mallika Maran
- Education: Loyola College, Chennai
- Website: www.dmaran.in
- As of 22 September, 2006

Dayanidhi Murasoli Maran (born 5 December 1966) is an Indian politician and one of the prominent members of Dravida Munnetra Kazhagam party. He was elected four times as a Member of Parliament to Lok Sabha from Chennai Central constituency during the 2004 general elections, 2009 general elections, 2019 general elections and 2024 elections.

He is the son of former Union Minister Murasoli Maran and the grandnephew of former Tamil Nadu Chief Minister and former DMK president M. Karunanidhi. He is the younger brother of Indian billionaire Kalanithi Maran, the founder, chairman of Sun Group and of Sun Risers Hyderabad. He is married to Priya, and has a daughter and a son.

Maran has wide exposure in the fields of media, television, cable technology, political economy and management and has been a delegate at many international seminars and conferences in various countries.

== Early life ==
Dayanidhi Maran is the second son of ex-minister Murasoli Maran, who was the Commerce and Industrial minister of India. He is also the grandnephew of DMK president and ex-chief minister of Tamil Nadu M. Karunanidhi. He is the younger brother of Kalanidhi Maran, the founder and managing director of Sun Network.

Maran studied at Don Bosco School, Egmore. He then graduated in economics from Loyola College, Chennai. He also attended the "Owner/President Management Programme" (OPM) from Harvard Business School (USA). The Owner/President Management Programme is meant for business owners/founders.

Maran is married to Priya of "The Hindu" family. Priya is the daughter of Ramesh Rangarajan, Director of Kasturi & Sons, and the pair have a daughter and a son.

== Positions held ==
Period	Position
14 Aug. 2024 onwards	Member of the Committee on Estimates
18 Jul. 2024 onwards	Member, Business Advisory Committee
June 2024	Elected to 18th Lok Sabha
June 2024 onwards	Member, Consultative Committee, Ministry of Finance and Ministry of Corporate Affairs
13 Sept. 2019 onwards	Member, Standing Committee on Home Affairs
24 Jul. 2019 onwards	Member, Committee on Estimates
May 2019	Re-elected to 17th Lok Sabha (3rd term)
31 May 2009 – 19 Jul. 2011	Union Cabinet Minister, Textiles
2009	Re-elected to 15th Lok Sabha (2nd term)
May 2004 – 13 May 2007	Union Cabinet Minister, Communications and Information Technology
2004	Elected to 14th Lok Sabha

== Tenure as an MP and Union minister ==
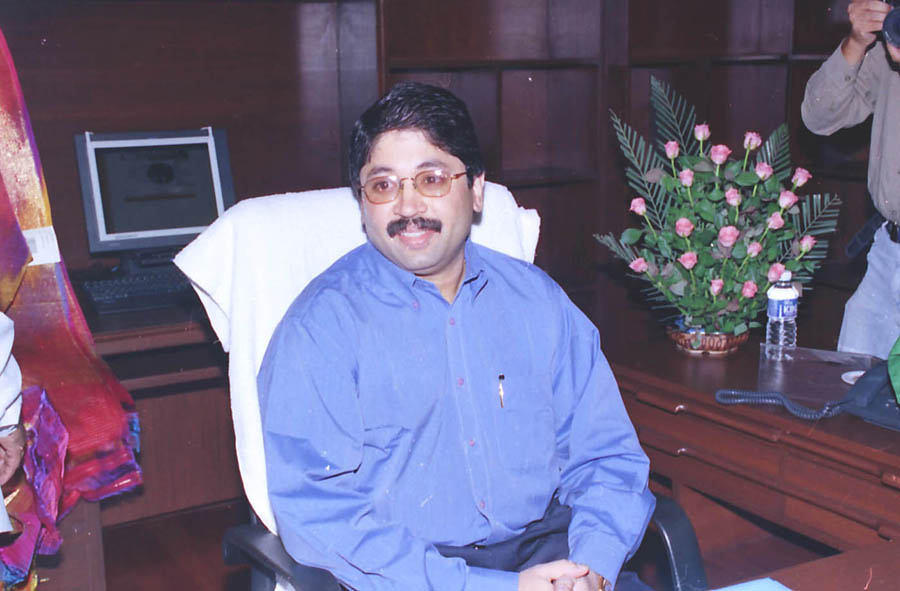
Dayanidhi Maran assumes the charge of Union Minister for Communications and Information Technology in New Delhi on 26 May 2004

He contested from Central Chennai Constituency in Tamil Nadu as a DMK party candidate and been elected thrice during the 2004, 2009 and 2019 elections as member of parliament.

During the 2004 elections, his winning margin was over 134,000 votes and he received 62% of the total votes polled. He was appointed Union Minister for Communications and Information Technology on 26 May 2004. During his tenure as IT and Telecommunication Minister the call rates of mobiles and landlines were drastically reduced which in-turn influenced the growth of subscriptions. During the tenure, he was instrumental in garnering a large amount of Foreign Direct Investments into Communication and Information Technology Sector. Many multinational telecom companies including Nokia, Motorola, Ericsson, Flextronics and Dell set up units in the country. His ministry introduced "One Rupee One India" plan across the country, which enabled calls across the country at a rate of 1 ₹ per minute. His ministry set and achieved a target of 250 million connections in December 2007 to December 2010, against 75 million in May 2004.

During the 2009 elections he won by a margin of 33,454 votes and he received 46.82% of the total votes polled.

During the 2019 Lok Sabha Elections, he once again contested from the Chennai Central Parliamentary Constituency, winning it for the 3rd time, polling a stunning 4,48,911 votes and defeated the other contestants with a record-breaking victory margin of 3,01,520 votes.

== Elections contested ==
Year	Constituency	Party	Result	Vote %	Opposition		
Year	Constituency	Party	Result	Vote %	Candidate	Party	Vote %
2004	Chennai Central	DMK	Won	61.68	N. Balaganga	AIADMK	35.52
2009	Chennai Central	DMK	Won	46.82	S.M.K. Mohamad Ali Jinnah	AIADMK	41.34
2014	Chennai Central	DMK	Lost	36.4	S. R. Vijayakumar	AIADMK	42.21
2019	Chennai Central	DMK	Won	57.15	S. R. Sam paul	PMK	18.77
2024	Chennai Central	DMK	Won	56.56	Vinoj	BJP	23.12

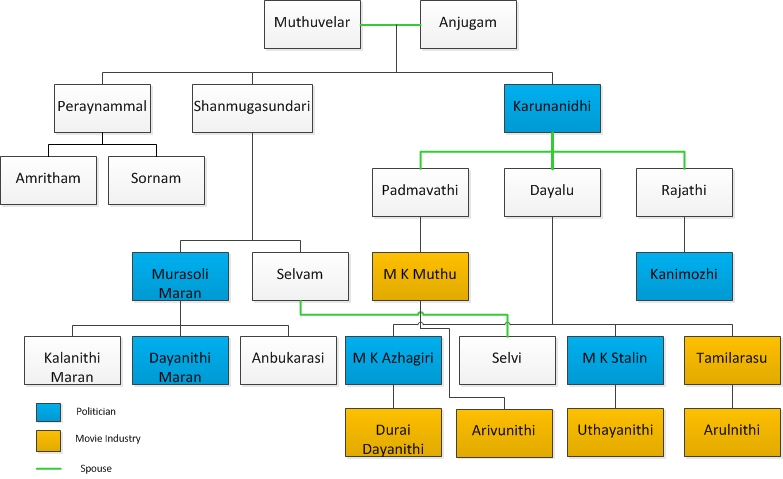
Karunanidhi family tree

== Controversies ==
=== Remarks on North Indian migrant workers ===
In December 2023, a video of Maran from a previous event went viral in which he compared the employment prospects of individuals who learn English with those who study only Hindi. Maran stated that while youth in Tamil Nadu learn English and secure high-paying jobs in the IT sector, individuals from northern states like Uttar Pradesh and Bihar who "only learn Hindi" migrate to Tamil Nadu to work in construction or perform "menial" tasks, such as cleaning roads and toilets.

The remarks were widely condemned across the political spectrum. The Bharatiya Janata Party (BJP) accused Maran of attempting to create a "North-South divide" and insulting the dignity of workers from northern India. Leaders from the INDIA bloc, including Tejashwi Yadav, also criticised the statement, calling it "condemnable" and noting that it did not reflect the values of social justice. The Dravida Munnetra Kazhagam (DMK) defended the context of his speech, stating that Maran's intention was to highlight the economic benefits of the state's two-language policy.
