= C. Gopalakrishnan =

Indian politician (born 1962)

Chinnaraj Gopalkrishnan

Member of the Indian parliament
- In office 1 September 2014 – 23 May 2019
- Preceded by: A. Raja
- Succeeded by: A. Raja
- Constituency: Nilgiris

Personal details
- Born: 17 February 1962 (age 64) Coonoor, The Nilgiris District, Tamil Nadu
- Party: All India Anna Dravida Munnetra Kazhagam
- Spouse: Smt. G. Susheela
- Education: Bharathiar University, Annamalai University, Madurai Kamaraj University, University of Mysore
- Occupation: Advocate
- As of 17 December, 2016

C Gopalkrishnan (ta:சி.கோபாலகிருஷ்ணன்) (born 1962) is an Indian politician and Member of Parliament elected from Tamil Nadu. He is elected to the Lok Sabha from Nilgiris constituency as an Anna Dravida Munnetra Kazhagam candidate in 2014 election.

He is the Chairman of the Coonoor Municipality.
