= S. R. Vijayakumar =

Indian politician

S.R. Vijayakumar

Member of Parliament, Lok Sabha for Chennai Central
- In office 1 September 2014 – 23 May 2019
- Preceded by: Dayanidhi Maran
- Succeeded by: Dayanidhi Maran
- Constituency: Chennai Central

AIADMK Tamil Nadu State Student wing Secretary
- In office 13 September 2013 – 25 December 2024
- General Secretary: J. Jayalalithaa; Edappadi K. Palaniswami
- Preceded by: Saravanaperumal
- Succeeded by: Singai G. Ramachandran

Personal details
- Born: 29 March 1974 (age 52) Chennai, Tamil Nadu
- Party: All India Anna Dravida Munnetra Kazhagam
- Spouse: Smt. V. Sujatha
- Children: 2
- Occupation: Advocate
- As of 17 December, 2016

S R Vijayakumar (b 1974) is an Indian politician and former Member of Parliament elected from Tamil Nadu. He was elected to the Lok Sabha from Chennai Central constituency as an Anna Dravida Munnetra Kazhagam candidate in the 2014 election. He has been serving as the Deputy Propaganda Secretary of the AIADMK from December 2024. He served as the State Student Wing Secretary of the AIADMK from 2013 to 2024.
