= Ponnusamy Venugopal =

Indian politician

Dr. Ponnusamy Venugopal
- Born: 28 April 1952 (age 74); Mappedu, Tiruvallur, (Tamil Nadu).
- Citizenship: India
- Education: M.B.B.S.
- Alma mater: Stanley Medical College, Chennai.
- Occupations: Politician & medical practitioner
- Political party: All India Anna Dravida Munnetra Kazhagam.
- Spouse: Mrs. Jayalakshmi.
- Children: 03
- Parent(s): Mr. Ponnusamy (father) & Mrs. Kamala (mother).

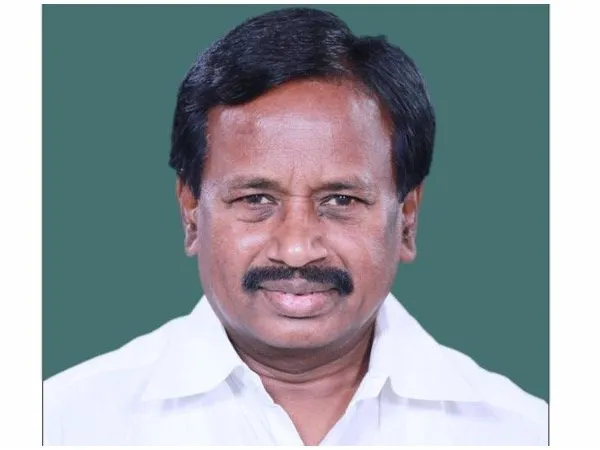
Dr P Venugopal in 2014 Lok Sabha Elections

Dr P.Venugopal (born 28 April 1952) is a physician and Indian politician from Tamilnadu with over 50 years of dedicated public service. His political journey began in 1972 when he joined the All India Anna Dravida Munnetra Kazhagam Party under the leadership of M. G. Ramachandran while pursuing Bsc at the University of Madras. He later earned his Bachelor of Medicine, Bachelor of Surgery from Stanley Medical College.

In 1997, former Chief Minister J. Jayalalithaa appointed Dr P Venugopal as the State Secretary of All India Anna Dravida Munnetra Kazhagam Medical Wing, a role in which he actively organised medical camps to serve the community. He was later elected to the Lok Sabha, serving two consecutive terms as the Member of the Parliament representing Tiruvallur Lok Sabha constituency from 2009to 2019. Dr Venugopal won in 2014 election with highest margin in Tamil Nadu.

During his tenure, he contributed to multiple Parliamentary Committees of India and participated in over 72 debates in Lok Sabha for the welfare of people of Tamil Nadu and especially Scheduled Castes and Scheduled Tribes. Also former Chief Minister of Tamil Nadu J. Jayalalithaa appointed Venugopal as the floor leader of 50 member of parliament representing Tamil Nadu. Dr Venugopal also served the standing committee on Rural Development,Government of India. Throughout his career spanning medicine and national governance, Dr Venugopal has remained deeply committed to Healthcare access, Rural development and community welfare.

Dr P Venugopal heavy heartedly quit All India Anna Dravida Munnetra Kazhagam on 24 May 2026 saying the Scheduled Castes are being alienated form the party and the Party does not have a proper leader with vision after the demise of Selvi J. Jayalalithaa.

== Early Life, Family, and Career of Dr P Venugopal ==
Dr. Venugopal is the son of the late Ponnusamy, a dedicated Veteran, Military of India who served in the Indian Armed Forces for over three decades, and late Kamala Ponnusamy. He completed is Primary education at a Government school in Mappedu, a village in Tamil Nadu. Later, he pursued his Medical degree at Stanley Medical College.

In 1991, Dr.Venugopal married Jayalakshmi, the same year he established his medical practice in Chennai. Together, they raised three children. Despite the demanding responsibilities of raising a family, he remained deeply committed to Public service. Today, he continues to devote the majority of his time treating patients and actively running his clinic in Moolakadai, Chennai

== Posts held ==
#	From	To	Position
01	1997	2026	All India Anna Dravida Munnetra Kazhagam Medical Wing Secretary
02	2009	2019	Member of parliament (15th & 16th Lok Sabha)
03	2009	2019	Member, Committee on Water Resources
04	2009	2019	Member, Consultative Committee, Ministry of Health & Family Welfare
05	2009	2019	Member, Committee on Food Management in Parliament House Complex
06	2014	2019	Chairman, Standing Committee on Rural Development

== See also ==
- List of members of the 15th Lok Sabha of India
- List of members of the 16th Lok Sabha

Party political offices
Preceded by M. Thambidurai	Leader of the All India Anna Dravida Munnetra Kazhagam Party in the 16th Lok Sabha; 2014–present	Incumbent
