= V. Pannerselvam =

Indian politician

Member of Parliament
- In office 1 September 2014 – 23 May 2019
- Constituency: Salem

Councillor - Salem Corporation
- In office 2006 - 2011

Personal details
- Born: 10 June 1959 (age 67) Salem, Tamil Nadu
- Party: All India Anna Dravida Munnetra Kazhagam
- Spouse: Smt. Manimozhi
- Children: 3
- Occupation: Advocate
- As of 17 December, 2016

V Pannerselvam (ta:வி. பன்னீர் செல்வம்; born 1955) is an Indian politician and Member of Parliament for the Salem constituency in Tamil Nadu. He was elected to the Lok Sabha as a candidate of the Anna Dravida Munnetra Kazhagam (AIADMK) party in the 2014 general election.

He is the Deputy Secretary of the party in the city of Salem and was a councillor in the Salem corporation from 2006 to 2011.
