= K. Rani =

K. Rani may refer to:

- K. Rani (politician) (born 1958), Indian politician from Tamil Nadu
- K. Rani (singer) (1942–2018), Indian playback singer
