= N. R. Elango =

Indian politician

Member of Parliament, Rajya Sabha for Tamilnadu
- In office 3 April 2020 – 2 April 2026
- Succeeded by: J. Constandine Ravindran
- Constituency: Tamil Nadu

Personal details
- Born: 16 June 1966 (age 60), Sholinghur, Ranipet, Tamilnadu
- Party: Dravida Munnetra Kazhagam (DMK)
- Spouse: Aruna Elango
- Children: 2
- Education: (B.L.) Government Law College, Thiruchirappalli
- Profession: Politician

N. R. Elango is an Indian politician and a member of Dravida Munnetra Kazhagam (DMK). He was a member of the Rajya Sabha, the upper house of the Parliament of India, from Tamil Nadu in 2020.
