= K. N. Ramachandran =

Indian politician

Krishnan Narayansamy Ramchandran

Member of the India Parliament for Sriperumbudur
- In office 1 September 2014 – 23 May 2019
- Constituency: Sriperumbudur

Personal details
- Born: 16 September 1939 (age 87) Chennai, Tamil Nadu
- Party: All India Anna Dravida Munnetra Kazhagam
- Spouse: Smt Thilagavathy
- Children: 2
- Relatives: K.N.Subaramaniyan, Manomani shanmugham
- Education: Madras University
- Occupation: Educationist
- As of 17 December, 2016

K N Ramachandra is an Indian politician. He was elected to the Tamil Nadu legislative assembly a candidate from Andimadam constituency in 1967 election.

Before being elected to the State Assembly, he was a professor and a scholar at government colleges. During his time as a professor, he was a lieutenant in the National Cadet Corps. He graduated with an honours degree in Tamil from Pachaiyappa's College, Madras (now Chennai). His close friend and classmate was Murasoli Maran former Member of Parliament and Minister of Industry and Commerce, Government of India. Ramachandran's contemporaries at the college were Nanjil K Manoharan and Dr Chokalingam. Former Finance Minister K Anabazhagan was Ramachandran's lecturer and their friendship continues.

Ramachandran is the author of two books: one each on Aringer Anna and Thanthai Periyar which were honoured as non-detailed books in high schools all over Tamil Nadu during the late 1960s and early 1970s.
