= Kalitheerthan Kamaraj =

Indian politician

Dr. K. Kamaraj

Member of the India Parliament for Kallakurichi
- In office 1 September 2014 – 23 May 2019
- Constituency: Kallakurichi

Personal details
- Born: 13 May 1965 (age 61) Tirukoilur, Madras State, India
- Party: All India Anna Dravida Munnetra Kazhagam
- Spouse: Smt. K. Vasantha Priya
- Children: 2
- Education: Madras Medical College
- Occupation: Medical Practitioner
- As of 17 December, 2016

Kalitheerthan Kamaraj is an Indian politician from Tamil Nadu, India. He is the AIADMK candidate from the Kallakurichi constituency in the April 2014 Indian Lok Sabha parliamentary elections.

== Early life and education ==
Kamaraj was born on 7 July 1966 at Somandargudi village in Sankarapuram circle, Villupuram district in Tamil Nadu, India. His father S. Kalitheerthan, was a two-time Member of the Legislative Assembly (1980 and 1985) representing the Sankarapuram constituency in the government headed by Chief Minister M. G. Ramachandran. His mother is Picchayi ammal.

Kamaraj completed his schooling in the Government primary school in Madoor and went to high school at the Government High School at Somandargudi before joining the Sir M.C.T.M Chettiar Higher Secondary School in Chennai to complete his school education. Joining the Madras Medical College in 1984, he graduated in 1989 as a medical doctor with the M.B.B.S. degree.

Following a one-year stint as senior house surgeon in General Surgery, Kamaraj secured admission to postgraduate course at Madras Medical College in 1992 and received a master's degree in General Surgery (M.S.) in 1994. He also underwent an MILT Leadership course conducted by the McGrath Institute of Leadership Training in Kolkata in 1987.

== Political career ==
His entry into the political arena was a natural extension of his social work in the area of health, and he is an active member of the Association of Surgeons of Rural India. In the AIADMK, Kamaraj holds the position of Secretary of the District Medical Wing, Villupuram (East) and has helped organise free health camps for residents of Kallakurichi district for three years including a major health and blood donation event on 26 February 2012, and a heart health screening camp on 3 March 2013.

Tenure	Positions Held
2014-	Member, 16th Lok Sabha Member, Standing Committee on Health and Family Welfare Member, Consultative Committee, Ministry of External Affairsand Overseas Indian Affairs

Kamaraj was officially nominated to be the AIADMK party's Lok Sabha election candidate from Kallakurichi constituency for the general elections in April 2014.

Dr. K. Kamaraj will be the AIADMK Lok Sabha party secretary. Dr. K Kamaraj will be the AIADMK Lok Sabha party whip.
