= P. Shanmugam (Tamil Nadu politician, born 1960) =

Indian politician

Comrade P. Shanmugam
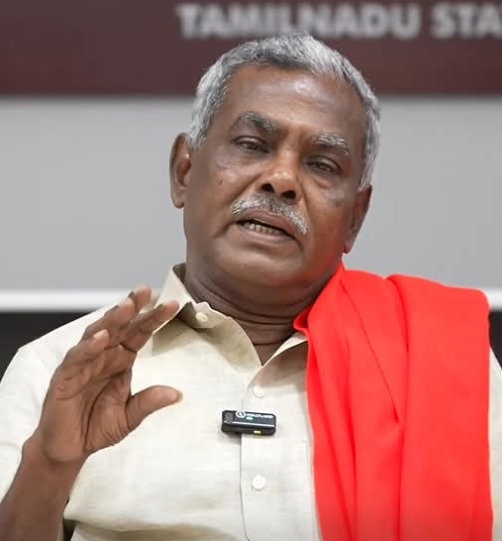

Secretary, Communist Party of India (Marxist) — Tamil Nadu State Committee
- Incumbent
- Assumed office 5 January 2025
- Preceded by: K. Balakrishnan

Member of Central Committee, Communist Party of India (Marxist)
- Incumbent
- Assumed office 10 April 2022

Personal details
- Born: 6 August 1960 (age 66) Peruvallanallur, Trichy, Madras State, India
- Citizenship: Indian
- Party: Communist Party of India (Marxist)
- Occupation: Politician

P. Shanmugam is a politician from the Indian state of Tamil Nadu, belonging to the Communist Party of India (Marxist) (CPI(M)). In 1992 he became the founding general secretary of the Tamilnadu Tribal Association and he emerged as a prominent leader in the campaign for justice for the 1992 Vachathi violence victims. Shanmugam served as the general secretary of the Tamil Nadu affiliate of the All India Kisan Sabha (the peasants' front linked to CPI(M)) for 13 years and went on to become name Kisan Sabha state unit president in 2020. He was elected to the CPI(M) Central Committee in 2022 and was elected as the secretary of the Tamil Nadu State Committee of the party in 2025, becoming the first Dalit to hold the post.

== Early life ==
Shanmugam was born on 6 August 1960 in Peruvallanallur village, Trichy district. He studied at the Ramasamy Tamil College in Karaikudi. He joined Students Federation of India (SFI), the student wing of the CPI(M), at the age of 19. He would go on to hold the posts of SFI Tamil Nadu state president and secretary.

== Career ==
=== Vachathi case ===
Shanmugam became the founding general secretary of the Tamilnadu Tribal Association in 1992, an organization advocating for rights for Adivasi peoples (Scheduled Tribes). Soon after the formation of TNTA, the organization under Shanmugam's leadership became embroiled in a three decades long struggle demanding justice in the Vachathi case. On 20 June 1992 a team of 155 forest personnel, 108 policemen and six revenue officials had entered the tribal-dominated Vachathi village, searching for smuggled sandalwood and to gather information about the bandit Veerappan. Under the pretext of conducting a search, the team ransacked the villagers' property, destroyed their houses, killed their cattle, assaulted around 100 villagers and raped 18 women.

The incident was unknown beyond the local area, but at a TNTA meeting in the Sitheri Hills in July 1992 local communists informed the TNTA leaders about the attack on Vachathi. Shanmugan led a TNTA team that visited the site on 14 July 1992. They encountered a vandalized ghost village, with most residents having fled. Shanmugam reported the incident to CPI(M) Rajya Sabha MP A. Nallasivan, who filed a petition in the Madras High Court on 20 August 1992. Shanmugam continued leading struggles within the court system and in the public to demand justice for the victims of the Vachathi case. The campaign succeeded in gaining national attention, and an inquiry by the Central Bureau of Investigation was initiated. Shanmugam also brought the case to the SC/ST Commission, which in 2007 awarded a compensation of 12,500,000 Indian rupees to the Vachathi case victims in 2007 (distributed among 500 villagers).

The Madras High Court finally passed a verdict on the Vachathi case on 29 September 2023, and Shanmugam was one of the speakers at the public victory celebration organised by the All India Lawyers Union in Chennai on 20 October 2023. Shanmugam authored a book on the case, titled A War Cry of the Lost: A Heroic Saga of Vaachathi.

During the course of the Vachathi case struggle, Shanmugam's role shifted to president of the Tamilnadu Tribal Association. He was also one of the leaders of the tribal people's struggle which led to the enactment of Forest Rights Act, 2006 in UPA-I government.

=== Peasants movement ===
He served as the general secretary of the Tamil Nadu state unit of the All India Kisan Sabha (peasants movement aligned with CPI(M). The Kisan Sabha is present throughout Tamil Nadu, and has a large membership in the state. He was named president of the Tamil Nadu state unit of the Kisan Sabha in 2020. Shanmugam played a prominent role in the protest movement against the 2020 three farm bills. He was arrested during the National Protest Day of the movement on 25 September 2020. Following the repeal of the three farm bills, Shanmugam advocated maintaining the peasants agitation in order to pressure the national government to withdraw the Electricity Amendment Bill and enact legislation fixing Minimum Support Price (MSP) for agricultural produces at above 50 per cent of cultivation cost.

As of 2024, he was one of the National Vice Presidents of the All India Kisan Sabha.

=== Communist Party of India (Marxist) ===
Shanmugam was elected to the Central Committee of CPI(M) at the 23rd Party Congress held at Kannur, Kerala on 10 April 2022. Ahead of the 2024 Indian general election he was the member of the four-member panel set up by the party to negotiate a seat sharing agreements with the Dravida Munnetra Kazhagam.

On 5 January 2025, Shanmugam was elected as the new secretary of the CPI(M) Tamil Nadu State Committee Tamil Nadu unit of Communist Party of India (Marxist) at the 24th party state conference held at Villupuram. The incumbent party state secretary K. Balakrishnan had requested to be relieved of his responsibilities due to old age. Shanmugam became the first Dalit to hold that post.

== Awards and recognition ==
In recognition of his efforts for the underprivileged, Shanmugam was named recipient of the Ambedkar Award 2023 from the Tamil Nadu state government. The award, along with a gold medal, a golden shawl and a 500,000 Indian rupees cash prize, was presented to Shanmugam at a ceremony in Chennai on 14 January 2024, presided by the Chief Minister M. K. Stalin.
