= Communist Party of India (Marxist) – Tamil Nadu =

Communist Party of India (Marxist), Tamil Nadu
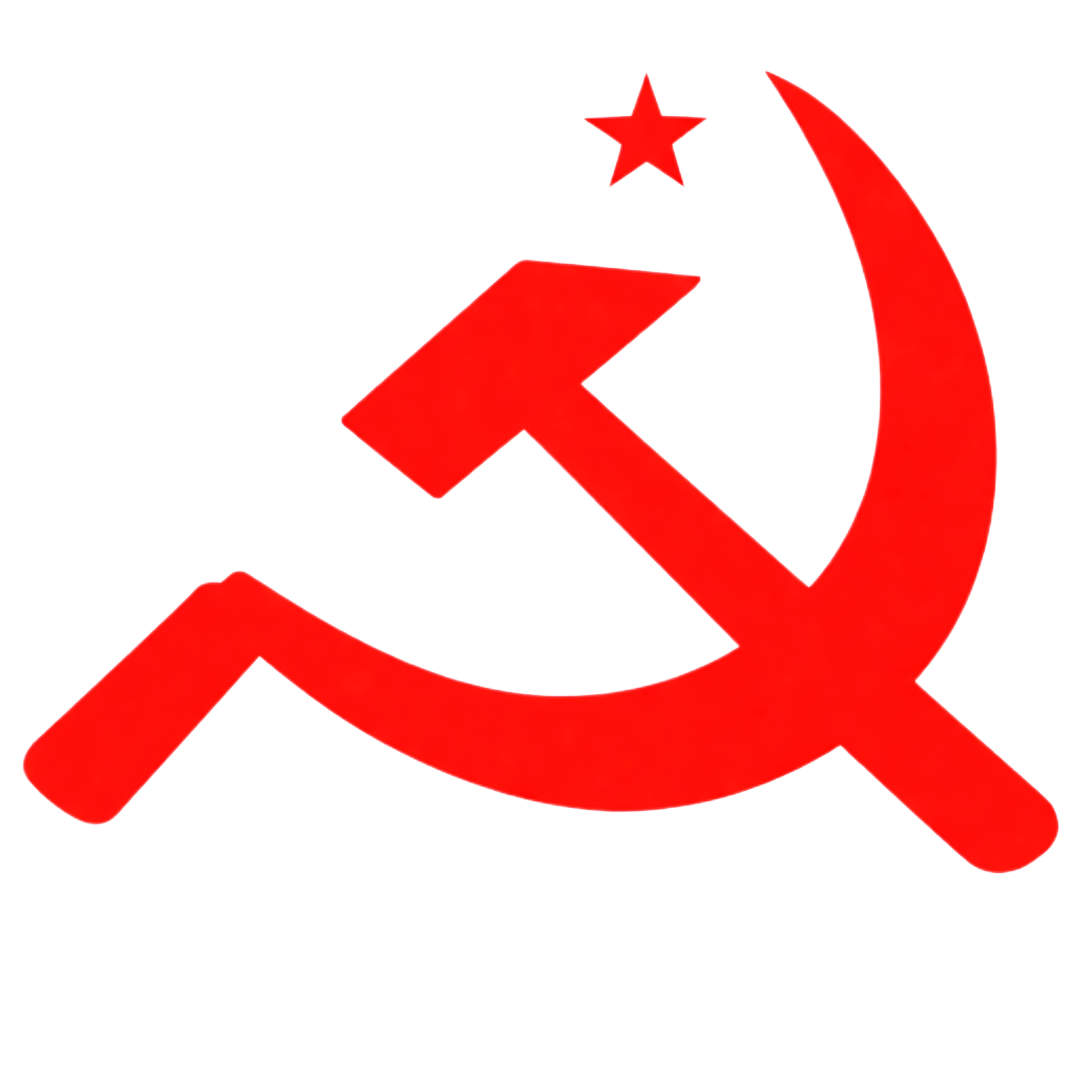
- Secretary: P. Shanmugam
- Headquarters: 27, Vaidyaraman St, T. Nagar, Chennai, Tamil Nadu—600017
- Newspaper: Theekkathir
- Student wing: Students' Federation of India
- Youth wing: Democratic Youth Federation of India
- Women's wing: All India Democratic Women's Association
- Labour wing: Centre of Indian Trade Unions
- Peasant's wing: All India Kisan Sabha; All India Agricultural Workers Union
- Ideology: Communism
- Political position: Left-wing
- Alliance: LDF (2026–present)
- Seats in Rajya Sabha: 0 / 18
- Seats in Lok Sabha: 2 / 39
- Seats in Tamil Nadu Legislative Assembly: 2 / 234

Election symbol
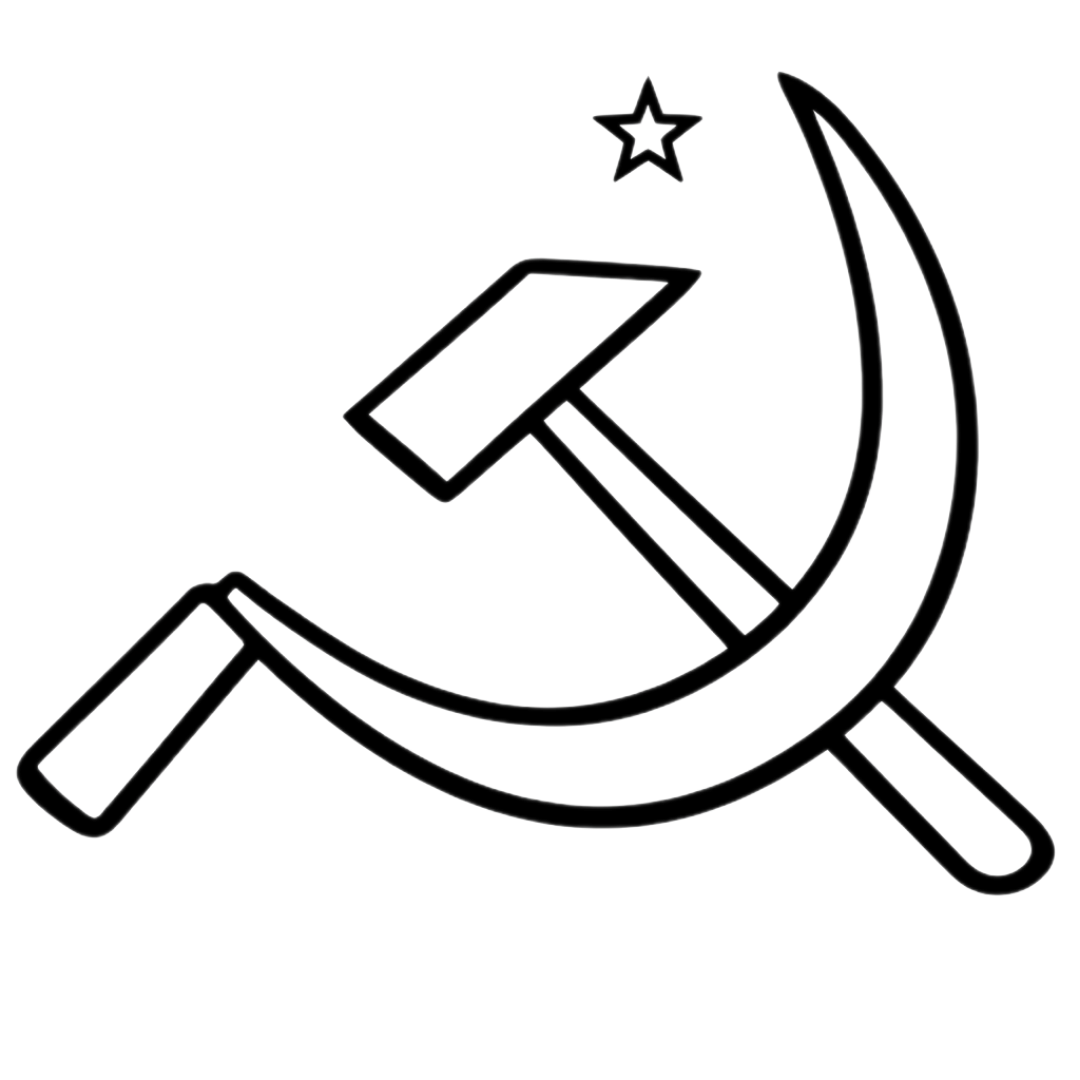

Party flag

Website
- cpim.org

The Communist Party of India (Marxist), or simply, CPI(M) Tamil Nadu; is the state unit of the Communist Party of India (Marxist) of the Tamil Nadu. Its head office is situated at Chennai, Tamil Nadu. The current secretary of the Communist Party of India (Marxist) Tamil Nadu State Committee is P. Shanmugam.

== Election results ==
=== Tamil Nadu Legislative Assembly election ===
Year	Party leader	Seats won	Change in seats	Outcome
1967	M. R. Venkataraman	11 / 234	▲11	Government
1971	M. R. Venkataraman	0 / 234	▼11	Opposition
1977	A. Balasubramaniam	12 / 234	▲12	Government
1980	A. Balasubramaniam	11 / 234	▼1	Government
1984		5 / 234	▼6	Opposition
1989		15 / 234	▲10	Government
1991		1 / 234	▼14	Opposition
1996	N. Sankaraiah	1 / 234	Steady	Opposition
2001	N. Sankaraiah	6 / 234	▲5	Government
2006	N. Varadarajan	9 / 234	▲3	Government
2011	G. Ramakrishnan	10 / 234	▲1	Government
2016	G. Ramakrishnan	0 / 234	▼10	Opposition
2021	K. Balakrishnan	2 / 234	▲2	Government
2026	P. Shanmugham	2 / 234	Steady	Outside Support to TVK Government

=== Lok Sabha ===
Year	Party leader	Seats won	Change in seats	Outcome
1967	Puchalapalli Sundarayya	4 / 39	New	Opposition
1971	Puchalapalli Sundarayya	0 / 39	▼4	Opposition
1977	Puchalapalli Sundarayya	0 / 39	Steady	Government
1980	E. M. S. Namboodiripad	0 / 39	Steady	Opposition
1984	E. M. S. Namboodiripad	0 / 39	Steady	Opposition
1989	E. M. S. Namboodiripad	0 / 39	Steady	Outside support to National Front government
1991	E. M. S. Namboodiripad	0 / 39	Steady	Opposition
1996	Harkishan Singh Surjeet	0 / 39	Steady	Opposition, later government
1998	Harkishan Singh Surjeet	0 / 39	Steady	Opposition
1999	Harkishan Singh Surjeet	1 / 39	▲1	Opposition
2004	Harkishan Singh Surjeet	2 / 39	▲2	Outside support to UPA government
2009	Prakash Karat	1 / 39	▼1	Opposition
2014	Prakash Karat	0 / 39	▼1	Opposition
2019	Sitaram Yechury	2 / 39	▲2	Opposition
2024	Sitaram Yechury	2 / 39	Steady	Opposition

== State Secretary List ==
No.	Portrait	Secretary (Birth–Death)	Term	Total Years as secretary
1		M. R. Venkataraman (1907–1985)	1964–1972	8 Years
2		A. Balasubramaniam (1917–1981)	1972–1981	9 Years
3		A. Nallasivan (1922–1997)	1981–1995	14 Years
4		N. Sankaraiah (1921–2023)	1995–2002	7 Years
5		N. Varadarajan (1924–2012)	2002–2010	8 Years
6		G. Ramakrishnan (1949–)	2010–2018	8 Years
7		K. Balakrishnan (1953–)	2018–2025	7 Years
8		P. Shanmugam (1960–)	2025–present	Incumbent

== List of Current Members in Tamil Nadu Legislative Assembly ==
No.	Constituency	Name	Party	Win Margin
164	Kilvelur (SC)	T. Latha	Communist Party of India (Marxist)	2,278
232	Padmanabhapuram	R. Chellasamy	Communist Party of India (Marxist)	15,569

== List of Current Members in Lok Sabha from Tamil Nadu ==
No.	Constituency	Name	Party	Win Margin
22	Dindigul	R. Sachithanantham	Communist Party of India (Marxist)	4,43,821
32	Madurai	S. Venkatesan	Communist Party of India (Marxist)	2,09,409

== See also ==
- Communist Party of India (Marxist), West Bengal
- Communist Party of India (Marxist), Kerala
- Communist Party of India (Marxist), Tripura
- List of political parties in India
- List of communist parties in India
- List of communist parties
- Left Front (West Bengal)
- Left Democratic Front (Kerala)
- Left Front (West Bengal)
- Left Front (Tripura)
- Politics of India
- Communist Party of India (Marxist)
