= Tammineni =

Tammineni (Telugu: తమ్మినేని) or Thammineni is a Telugu surname. Notable people with the surname include:

- Tammineni Seetharam (born 1955), Indian politician
- Tammineni Veerabhadram (born 1954), Indian politician
