= Dindigul Lok Sabha constituency =

Parliamentary constituency in Tamil Nadu, India

Coordinates: 10.35°N 77.95°E

Dindigul
- Lok Sabha constituency
- Interactive map of Dindigul Loksabha constituency, post-2008 delimitation

Constituency details
- Country: India
- Region: South India
- State: Tamil Nadu
- Assembly constituencies: Palani; Oddanchatram; Athoor; Nilakkottai; Natham; Dindigul
- Established: 1952
- Total electors: 16,37,511; 8,13,707(Male); 8,23,696 (Female); 108 (Others)

Member of Parliament
- 18th Lok Sabha
- Incumbent R. Sachidanandam
- Party: CPI(M)
- Alliance: INDIA
- Elected year: 2024
- Preceded by: P. Velusamy

Dindigul is a Lok Sabha (Parliament of India) constituency in Tamil Nadu. Its Tamil Nadu Parliamentary Constituency number is 22 of 39. It includes six Assembly constituencies like Athoor, Dindigul, Oddanchatram, Natham, Nilakottai and Palani.

== Assembly segments ==
=== 2009-present ===
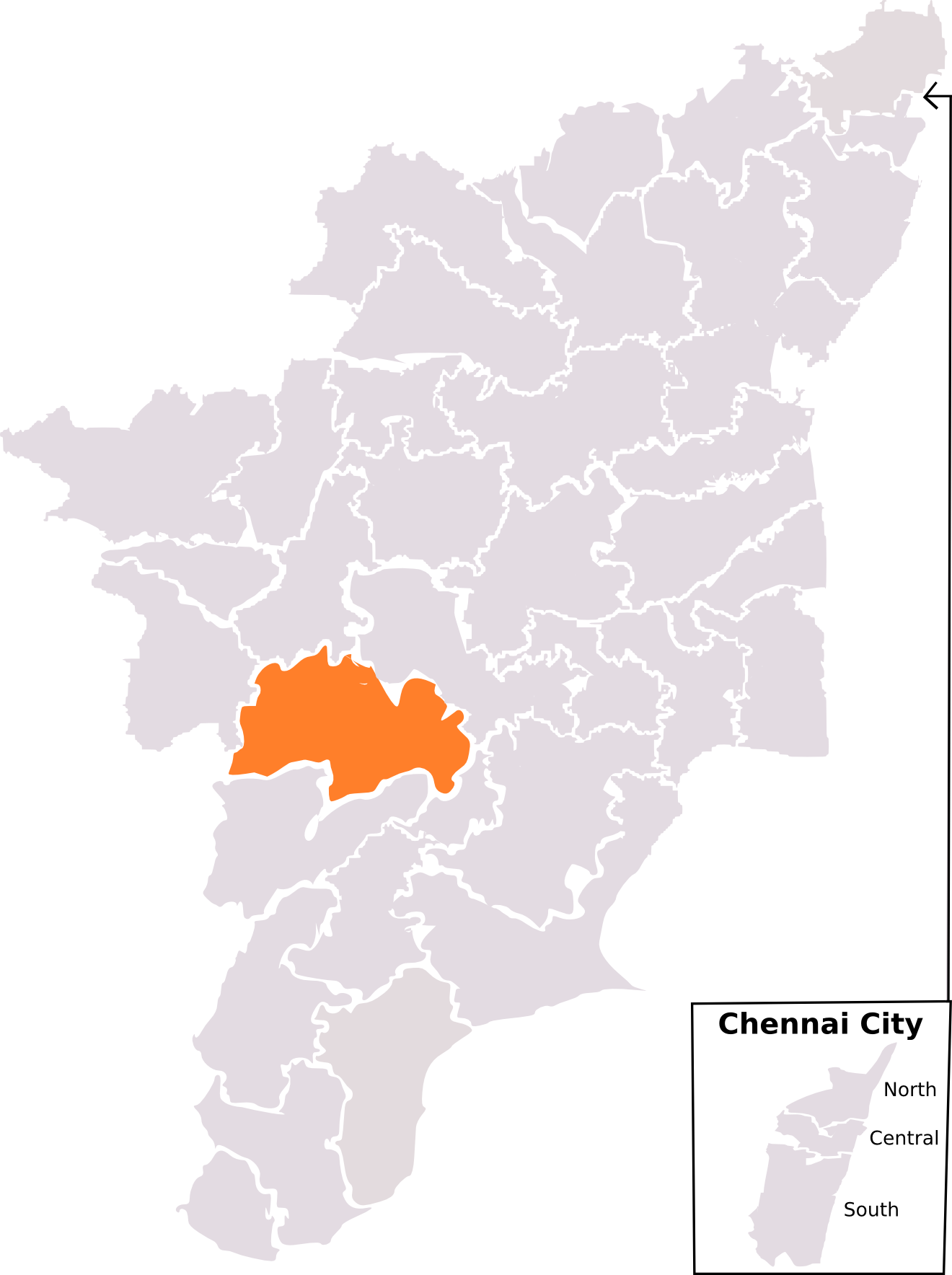
Dindigul constituency as laid out by 2008 Delimitation

Constituency number	Name	Reserved for (SC/ST/None)	District	Party	2024 Lead
127.	Palani	None	Dindigul	AIADMK	CPI(M)
128.	Oddanchatram	None	Dindigul	DMK	CPI(M)
129.	Athoor	None	Dindigul	DMK	CPI(M)
130.	Nilakottai	SC	Dindigul	TVK	CPI(M)
131.	Natham	None	Dindigul	AIADMK	CPI(M)
132.	Dindigul	None	Dindigul	DMK	CPI(M)

=== Before 2009 ===
1. Tirumanagalam (moved to Virudhunagar constituency after 2009)
2. Usilampatti (moved to Theni constituency after 2009)
3. Nilakottai (SC)
4. Sholavandan (moved to Theni constituency after 2009)
5. Dindigul
6. Athoor

== Members of Parliament ==
Lok Sabha	Duration	Name of M.P.	Party Affiliation
First	1952-1957	Ammu Swaminathan	Indian National Congress
Second	1957-1962	M. Gulam Mohideen	Indian National Congress
Third	1962-1967	T. S. Soundram	Indian National Congress
Fourth	1967-1971	N. Anbuchezhian	Dravida Munnetra Kazhagam
Fifth	1971-1973	M. Rajangam	Dravida Munnetra Kazhagam
Fifth	1973-1977	K. Maya Thevar	All India Anna Dravida Munnetra Kazhagam
Sixth	1977-1980	K. Maya Thevar	All India Anna Dravida Munnetra Kazhagam
Seventh	1980-1984	K. Maya Thevar	Dravida Munnetra Kazhagam
eighth	1984-1989	K. R. Natarajan	All India Anna Dravida Munnetra Kazhagam
Ninth	1989-1991	Dindigul C. Sreenivasan	All India Anna Dravida Munnetra Kazhagam
Tenth	1991-1996	Dindigul C. Sreenivasan	All India Anna Dravida Munnetra Kazhagam
Eleventh	1996-1998	N. S. V. Chitthan	Tamil Maanila Congress
Twelfth	1998-1999	Dindigul C. Sreenivasan	All India Anna Dravida Munnetra Kazhagam
Thirteenth	1999-2004	Dindigul C. Sreenivasan	All India Anna Dravida Munnetra Kazhagam
Fourteenth	2004-2009	N. S. V. Chitthan	Indian National Congress
Fifteenth	2009-2014	N. S. V. Chitthan	Indian National Congress
Sixteenth	2014-2019	M. Udhayakumar	All India Anna Dravida Munnetra Kazhagam
Seventeenth	2019-2024	P. Velusamy	Dravida Munnetra Kazhagam
Eighteenth	2024–Incumbent	R. Sachidanandam	Communist Party of India (Marxist)

== Election results ==
Vote share of Winning candidates
2024	58.29%
2019	64.60%
2014	47.58%
2009	44.10%
2004	58.98%
1999	43.78%
1998	46.55%
1996	63.97%
1991	67.04%
1989	67.24%
1984	61.79%
1980	51.78%
1977	59.60%
By-Election 1973	52.0%
1971	59.88%
1967	62.40%
1962	43.23%
1957	27.99%
1951	36.89%

=== General Elections 2024 ===
2024 Indian general election: Dindigul
Party	Candidate	Votes	%	±%
CPI(M)	R. Sachidanandam	670,149	58.29	▲New
AIADMK	Mohamed Mubarak	2,26,328	19.69	▲New
PMK	M. Thilagabama	1,12,503	9.79	▼8.17
NOTA	None of the above	22,120	1.92	▲0.69
Margin of victory		4,43,821	38.6	
Turnout		11,49,621	71.14	
Registered electors				
CPI(M) gain from DMK		Swing		

=== General Elections 2019 ===
2019 Indian general election: Dindigul
Party	Candidate	Votes	%	±%
DMK	P. Velusamy	746,523	64.60%	▲28.93%
PMK	K. Jothimuthu	2,07,551	17.96%	
Independent	P. Jothi Murugan	62,875	5.44%	
MNM	Dr. S. Suthakaran	38,784	3.36%	
BSP	Arasur Manoharan (A) S. Manoharan	5,743	0.49%	
Independent	N. Vetrivel	3,903	0.34%	
Independent	M. Nagaraj	3,291	0.28%	
Independent	M. Pandi	3,111	0.27%	
Independent	T. Ananthraj	3,022	0.26%	
Independent	R. Eswaran	2,764	0.24%	
UMK	K. Suresh	2,208	0.19%	
Independent	A. Arun Kumar	1,804	0.16%	
Independent	S. P. Murugesan	1,516	0.13%	
Independent	M. Dineshkumar	1,418	0.12%	
Independent	D. Anburose	1,324	0.11%	
Independent	A. Udayakumar	1,181	0.10%	
Independent	V. Vembarasan	1,126	0.10%	
Independent	G. Irudayasamy	1,064	0.09%	
Independent	K. Shanmuga Prabu	853	0.07%	
Independent	P. Velusamy	851	0.07%	
NOTA	None of the above	14,177	1.23%	0.24%
Margin of victory		5,38,972	46.64%	34.72%
Turnout		11,55,607	74.95%	−1.65%
Registered electors		15,41,881		10.09%
DMK gain from AIADMK		Swing	17.02%	

==== Assembly Constituency wise ====
#	Candidate	Party	Assembly Constituencies						Total Votes	%
#	Candidate	Party	Palani	Oddanchatram	Athoor	Nilakkottai	Natham	Dindigul	Total Votes	%
1	P. Velusamy	DMK	1,24,038	1,26,187	154,711	93,983	134,891	110,003	7,46,523	64.60%
2	K. Jothimuthu	PMK	31,955	27,599	27,717	62,701	30,181	26,629	2,07,551	17.96%
3	P. Jothi Murugan	IND	144	9,783	9,072	9,001	12,308	9,139	62,875	5.44%
4	Mansoor Ali Khan	NTK	6,839	5,578	10,996	7,358	11,077	12,726	54,957	4.76%
5	Dr. S. Suthakaran	MNM	6,815	3,351	5,230	4,080	3,795	15,315	38,784	3.36%
6	Arasur Manoharan (A) S. Manoharan	BSP	765	863	1,012	1,436	943	685	5,743	0.49%
7	N. Vetrivel	IND	607	779	799	376	944	398	3,903	0.34%
8	M. Nagaraj	IND	638	692	661	210	747	341	3,291	0.28%
9	M. Pandi	IND	506	546	498	479	677	403	3,111	0.27%
10	T. Ananthraj	IND	518	518	403	469	809	305	3,022	0.26%
11	R. Eswaran	IND	630	550	360	330	583	306	2,764	0.24%
12	K. Suresh	UMK	335	392	367	420	463	221	2,208	0.19%
13	A. Arun Kumar	IND	347	275	268	339	380	188	1,804	0.16%
14	S. P. Murugesan	IND	237	273	220	253	336	196	1,516	0.13%
15	M. Dineshkumar	IND	254	289	244	138	353	137	1,418	0.12%
16	D. Anburose	IND	201	167	191	215	308	233	1,324	0.11%
17	A. Udayakumar	IND	189	178	200	148	288	172	1,181	0.10%
18	V. Vembarasan	IND	169	196	180	150	308	121	1,126	0.10%
19	G. Irudayasamy	IND	125	121	172	311	204	126	1,064	0.09%
20	K. Shanmuga Prabu	IND	131	170	155	109	204	80	853	0.07%
21	V. Velusamy	IND	144	155	132	125	183	110	851	0.07%
None Of The Above		NOTA	2,269	1,938	2,803	1,526	2,344	3,171	14,177	1.23%
Total Valid Votes			1,88,859	1,78,662	2,13,588	1,82,631	1,99,982	1,77,834	11,55,607	74.95%

=== General Elections 2014 ===
2014 Indian general election: Dindigul
Party	Candidate	Votes	%	±%
AIADMK	M. Udhayakumar	510,462	47.58%	10.11%
DMK	S. Gandhirajan	3,82,617	35.67%	
DMDK	A. Krishnamoorthy	93,794	8.74%	−3.55%
INC	N. S. V. Chitthan	35,632	3.32%	−40.78%
CPI(M)	N. Pandi	19,455	1.81%	
NOTA	None of the above	10,591	0.99%	
Independent	R. Rajendhran	7,580	0.71%	
Independent	N. Manivannan	5,859	0.55%	
Margin of victory		1,27,845	11.92%	5.29%
Turnout		10,72,773	76.60%	1.08%
Registered electors		14,00,531		29.00%
AIADMK gain from INC		Swing	3.49%	

=== General Elections 2009 ===
2009 Indian general election: Dindigul
Party	Candidate	Votes	%	±%
INC	N. S. V. Chitthan	361,545	44.10%	−14.88%
AIADMK	P. Baalasubramani	3,07,198	37.47%	0.97%
DMDK	P. Muthuvelraj	1,00,788	12.29%	
BSP	M. Srinivasa Babu	6,960	0.85%	0.12%
Independent	K. A. Motilal	6,706	0.82%	
KNMK	M. Sellamuthu K	6,411	0.78%	
Independent	K. Durai	6,063	0.74%	
Independent	G. Manikanda Prabu	5,331	0.65%	
Margin of victory		54,347	6.63%	−15.85%
Turnout		10,85,696	75.51%	14.83%
Rejected ballots		3	0.00%	
Registered electors		8,19,860		−4.54%
INC hold		Swing	-14.88%	

=== General Elections 2004 ===
2004 Indian general election: Dindigul
Party	Candidate	Votes	%	±%
INC	N. S. V. Chitthan	407,116	58.98%	
AIADMK	M. Jeyaraman	2,51,945	36.50%	−7.28%
Independent	J. Ravindran	10,359	1.50%	
JP	P. Thinakara Kumar	5,850	0.85%	
JD(U)	Pushpa Sachan	5,206	0.75%	
BSP	M. Perumal	5,011	0.73%	
Margin of victory		1,55,171	22.48%	19.46%
Turnout		6,90,231	60.69%	3.23%
Registered electors		11,37,313		−4.80%
INC gain from AIADMK		Swing	15.21%	

=== General Elections 1999 ===
1999 Indian general election: Dindigul
Party	Candidate	Votes	%	±%
AIADMK	Dindigul C. Srinivasan	294,794	43.78%	18.33%
DMK	S. Chandrasekar	2,74,451	40.76%	
TMC(M)	N. S. V. Chitthan	69,713	10.35%	
AIFB	K. Surendran	32,342	4.80%	
Margin of victory		20,343	3.02%	0.46%
Turnout		6,73,398	57.46%	−10.02%
Registered electors		11,94,616		4.44%
AIADMK hold		Swing	-20.20%	

=== General Elections 1998 ===
1998 Indian general election: Dindigul
Party	Candidate	Votes	%	±%
AIADMK	Dindigul C. Srinivasan	276,106	46.55%	
TMC(M)	N. S. V. Chitthan	2,60,907	43.98%	
MADMK	S. Latha	35,119	5.92%	
PT	C. Santhana Krishnan	19,176	3.23%	
Margin of victory		15,199	2.56%	−35.97%
Turnout		5,93,173	53.47%	−14.01%
Registered electors		11,43,880		6.40%
AIADMK gain from TMC(M)		Swing	-17.43%	

=== General Elections 1996 ===
1996 Indian general election: Dindigul
Party	Candidate	Votes	%	±%
TMC(M)	N. S. V. Chitthan	444,858	63.97%	
AIADMK	Dindigul C. Srinivasan	1,76,944	25.45%	−41.60%
MDMK	S. Pasumpon Pandian	54,202	7.79%	
PMK	P. Gopal	10,986	1.58%	
ATMK	R. Muthumani	4,060	0.58%	
Margin of victory		2,67,914	38.53%	2.42%
Turnout		6,95,368	67.48%	5.68%
Registered electors		10,75,085		4.26%
TMC(M) gain from AIADMK		Swing	-3.07%	

=== General Elections 1991 ===
1991 Indian general election: Dindigul
Party	Candidate	Votes	%	±%
AIADMK	Dindigul C. Srinivasan	416,652	67.04%	−0.20%
DMK	Maya Thevar	1,92,235	30.93%	
PMK	P. Gopal	7,194	1.16%	
Margin of victory		2,24,417	36.11%	−0.28%
Turnout		6,21,479	61.80%	−1.61%
Registered electors		10,31,174		−0.16%
AIADMK hold		Swing	-0.20%	

=== General Elections 1989 ===
1989 Indian general election: Dindigul
Party	Candidate	Votes	%	±%
AIADMK	Dindigul C. Srinivasan	434,966	67.24%	5.45%
CPI(M)	N. Varatharajan	1,99,598	30.86%	
PMK	K. Raithinasamy	7,579	1.17%	
Independent	S. Palanisamy	2,901	0.45%	
Margin of victory		2,35,368	36.39%	10.97%
Turnout		6,46,863	63.41%	−7.81%
Registered electors		10,32,870		26.92%
AIADMK hold		Swing	5.45%	

=== General Elections 1984 ===
1984 Indian general election: Dindigul
Party	Candidate	Votes	%	±%
AIADMK	K. R. Natarajan	343,571	61.79%	15.67%
DMK	Maya Thevar	2,02,253	36.38%	−15.41%
Independent	P. Pitchaimani	5,474	0.98%	
Margin of victory		1,41,318	25.42%	19.76%
Turnout		5,55,997	71.22%	7.65%
Registered electors		8,13,821		7.46%
AIADMK gain from DMK		Swing	10.01%	

=== General Elections 1980 ===
1980 Indian general election: Dindigul
Party	Candidate	Votes	%	±%
DMK	Maya Thevar	244,669	51.78%	
AIADMK	V. Rajan Chellappa	2,17,923	46.12%	−13.48%
Independent	S. Muthukrishnan	3,506	0.74%	
JP(S)	S. Krishnan	2,552	0.54%	
Margin of victory		26,746	5.66%	−29.93%
Turnout		4,72,487	63.57%	−3.49%
Registered electors		7,57,333		5.02%
DMK gain from AIADMK		Swing	-7.82%	

=== General Elections 1977 ===
1977 Indian general election: Dindigul
Party	Candidate	Votes	%	±%
AIADMK	Maya Thevar	283,341	59.60%	
CPI(M)	A. Balasumbramaniam	1,14,117	24.00%	
Independent	P. K. Mookkiah Thevar	60,500	12.73%	
Independent	N. M. Santhanam	8,768	1.84%	
Independent	M. Manokaran	5,830	1.23%	
Independent	N. Sreenivasan	2,861	0.60%	
Margin of victory		1,69,224	35.59%	12.08%
Turnout		4,75,417	67.06%	−3.89%
Registered electors		7,21,154		16.45%
AIADMK gain from DMK		Swing	-0.28%	

==== Bye-election 1973 ====
Bye-election 1973: Dindigul
Party	Candidate	Votes	%	±%
AIADMK	K. Maya Thevar	2,60,824	52.0	
INC(O)	V. C. Sitthan	1,19,032	20.1%	
DMK	Pon Muthu Ramalingam	93,496	18.5%	
INC	Seemaisamy	11,423	2.2%	
Majority		1,41,792		
Turnout		6,43,704		
AIADMK gain from DMK		Swing		

=== General Elections 1971 ===
1971 Indian general election: Dindigul
Party	Candidate	Votes	%	±%
DMK	M. Rajangam	248,638	59.88%	−2.52%
SWA	K. Chemachamy	1,51,003	36.36%	
Independent	K. P. Kuppusamy Moopanar	15,610	3.76%	
Margin of victory		97,635	23.51%	−1.28%
Turnout		4,15,251	70.95%	−6.06%
Registered electors		6,19,290		11.41%
DMK hold		Swing	-2.52%	

=== General Elections 1967 ===
1967 Indian general election: Dindigul
Party	Candidate	Votes	%	±%
DMK	N. Anbuchezhian	260,065	62.40%	35.91%
INC	T. S. S. Ramachndran	1,56,719	37.60%	−5.62%
Margin of victory		1,03,346	24.80%	8.06%
Turnout		4,16,784	77.01%	5.11%
Registered electors		5,55,868		20.54%
DMK gain from INC		Swing	19.17%	

=== General Elections 1962 ===
1962 Indian general election: Dindigul
Party	Candidate	Votes	%	±%
INC	T. S. Soundram	138,574	43.23%	15.24%
DMK	M. S. Abdul Khader	84,921	26.49%	
CPI	N. Krishnaswami	80,406	25.08%	
SWA	Sakuntala	16,673	5.20%	
Margin of victory		53,653	16.74%	9.97%
Turnout		3,20,574	71.90%	−22.30%
Registered electors		4,61,145		−46.08%
INC hold		Swing	15.24%	

=== General Elections 1957 ===
1957 Indian general election: Dindigul
Party	Candidate	Votes	%	±%
INC	M. Gulam Mohideen	225,510	27.99%	−8.90%
INC	S. C. Balakrishna	1,70,995	21.22%	−15.67%
CPI	Krishnasamy	1,32,070	16.39%	
CPI	R. Muniyandi	94,038	11.67%	
Independent	A. Desiar	77,680	9.64%	
Independent	Pitchaimuthu	63,645	7.90%	
Independent	Janakai N Karuppa Pillai	41,724	5.18%	
Independent	G. D. Naidu	0	0.00%	
Margin of victory		54,515	6.77%	0.88%
Turnout		8,05,662	94.20%	33.91%
Registered electors		8,55,235		146.17%
INC hold		Swing	-8.90%	

=== General Elections 1951 ===
1951–52 Indian general election: Dindigul
Party	Candidate	Votes	%	±%
INC	Ammu Swaminathan	77,285	36.89%	36.89%
CPI	Krishnaswami	64,953	31.01%	
Independent	Rengaswami Reddiar	48,808	23.30%	
KMPP	M. Natarajan	18,442	8.80%	
Margin of victory		12,332	5.89%	
Turnout		2,09,488	60.30%	
Registered electors		3,47,422		0.00%
INC win (new seat)				

== See also ==
- Dindigul
- List of constituencies of the Lok Sabha
