= A. Balasubramaniam (politician) =

Indian politician (1917–1981)

Member of Central Committee, Communist Party of India (Marxist)
- In office 7 November 1964 – 5 September 1981

Member of Legislative Assembly, Tamil Nadu
- In office 1967–1971
- Preceded by: R. Rengasamy
- Succeeded by: O. N. Sundaram Pillai
- Constituency: Dindigul

State Secretary of the Communist Party of India (Marxist), Tamil Nadu
- In office 1972 – 5 September 1981
- Preceded by: M. R. Venkataraman
- Succeeded by: A. Nallasivan

Member of Polit Bureau of the Communist Party of India (Marxist)
- In office 8 April 1978 – 5 September 1981

Personal details
- Born: 21 October 1917
- Died: 5 September 1981 (aged 63)
- Party: Communist Party of India (Marxist)
- Occupation: Politician

A. Balasubramaniam (21 October 1917 – 5 September 1981) was an Indian communist politician from Tamil Nadu. He was a Polit Bureau member of Communist Party of India (Marxist) and served as Member of Legislative Assembly representing Dindigul Assembly constituency.

== Political career ==
In 1943, he became a member of the Communist Party of India.

In 1956, Balasubramaniam was elected secretary of the Madurai District Committee of the party and also became a member of the state secretariat of the Party.

He joined Communist Party of India (Marxist) during 1964 split in the CPI and he was elected to the Central Committee of the CPI(M) at the Seventh Party congress held at Kolkata in 1964 and was re-elected to the Central Committee at Eighth, Ninth and Tenth Party Congresses.

In 1972, he became the secretary of the CPIM Tamil Nadu State Committee and remained so till the death.

He was elected to the Polit Bureau at the Jalandhar Congress of 1978 and remained a member of the PB till his death.

== Election to the Madras Legislative Assembly ==
He was a member of the Tamil Nadu assembly for one term from 1967 to 1971 representing Dindigul Assembly constituency. He defeated his nearest candidate O.C. Pillai of Indian National Congress by a margin of 12,844 votes.

1967 Madras Legislative Assembly election: Dindigul
Party	Candidate	Votes	%	±%
CPI(M)	A. Balasubramaniam	42,381	58.93%	
INC	O. C. Pillai	29,537	41.07%	−7.16%
Margin of victory		12,844	17.86%	13.54%
Turnout		71,918	78.54%	1.16%
Registered electors		94,204		
CPI(M) gain from INC		Swing	10.70%	

== Death ==
He died on September 5, 1981.
