= P. Velusamy =

Indian politician and member of the 17th Lok Sabha

P . Velusamy

Member of Parliament, Lok Sabha
- In office 23 May 2019 – 4 June 2024
- Preceded by: M. Udhayakumar
- Succeeded by: R. Sachidanandam
- Constituency: Dindigul, Tamil Nadu

Personal details
- Born: 30 March 1967 (age 59) Javathupatti, Oddanchatram, Dindigul district, Tamil Nadu
- Party: Dravida Munnetra Kazhagam
- Spouse: Parameswari
- Children: 2
- Profession: Business person and Agriculturist

Palanisamy Velusamy is an Indian politician. He was elected to the Lok Sabha, lower house of the Parliament of India from Dindigul, Tamil Nadu in the 2019 Indian general election as member of the Dravida Munnetra Kazhagam.
