= Lakshmi Sahgal =

Indian nationalist leader (1914–2012)

Captain Lakshmi Sahgal
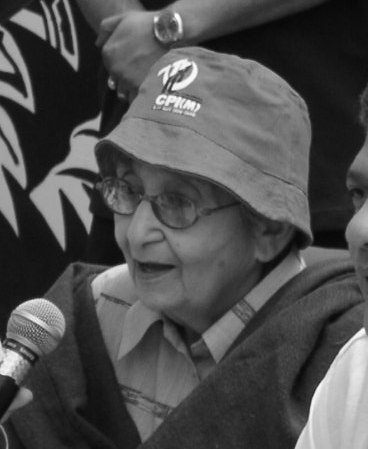
- Sahgal at the 18th congress of Communist Party of India (Marxist) in Delhi, 2005
- Born: Lakshmi Swaminathan; 24 October 1914; Anakkara, Ponnani taluk, Malabar District, British India
- Died: 23 July 2012 (aged 97); Kanpur, Uttar Pradesh, India
- Education: Queen Mary's College, Chennai; Madras Medical College
- Known for: Rani Jhansi Regiment in the Indian National Army; Founding member of All India Democratic Women's Association
- Political party: Communist Party of India (Marxist)
- Spouses: P. K. N. Rao (before 1940); Prem Kumar Sahgal (m. 1947; died 1992)
- Children: 2 (incl. Subhashini Ali)
- Mother: Ammu Swaminathan
- Family: Swaminathan family
- Awards: Padma Vibhushan (1998)

Lakshmi Sahgal (née Swaminathan; 24 October 1914 – 23 July 2012) was an Indian politician and activist. She was a revolutionary of the Indian independence movement, an officer of the Indian National Army (INA), and the Minister of Women's Affairs in the Azad Hind Government. She is commonly referred to in India as Captain Lakshmi, a reference to her participation in the INA's Rani Jhansi Regiment during the Second World War. A prominent member of the Communist Party of India (Marxist), she was a founding member of the All India Democratic Women's Association. In 1998, Sahgal was awarded the Padma Vibhushan, India's second-highest civilian award. Following this, in the 2002 Indian presidential election, she was nominated as the presidential candidate opposite A. P. J. Abdul Kalam. A medical doctor by profession, she practiced till her death in Kanpur in 2012.

== Early life ==
Lakshmi Swaminathan was born on 24 October 1914 to S. Swaminathan, a lawyer who practiced criminal law at Madras High Court, and A.V. Ammukutty, better known as Ammu Swaminathan, a social worker and independence activist from an aristocratic Nair family known as "Vadakkath" family of Anakkara, Ponnani taluk, Malabar District, British India. She was the elder sister of Mrinalini Sarabhai and the younger sister of Govind Swaminadhan.

As a child, Lakshmi joined her mother in burning their clothes in a pyre to protest against the import of foreign goods, as part of the Swadeshi movement. Lakshmi was later introduced to and deeply influenced by Suhasini Nambiar, the first Indian woman to join the Communist Party, while Nambiar was in hiding at the Swaminathan's house at Gilchrist Gardens in Madras.

Lakshmi studied in Queen Mary's College, Chennai and later chose to study medicine and received an MBBS degree from Madras Medical College in 1938. A year later, she received her diploma in gynaecology and obstetrics. She worked as a doctor in the Government Kasturba Gandhi Hospital located at Triplicane Chennai.

She was described as being beautiful in college and was a talented singer. In June 1940, she left for Singapore after the failure of her marriage to pilot P. K. N. Rao of Tata Airlines. Rao and Lakshmi were only together for six months. She then fell in love with a senior of hers from medical college, known only as "K". She left for Singapore with "K" and they together set up a private practice to treat patients. During her stay at Singapore, she met some members of Subhas Chandra Bose's Indian National Army.

== The Azad Hind Fauj ==
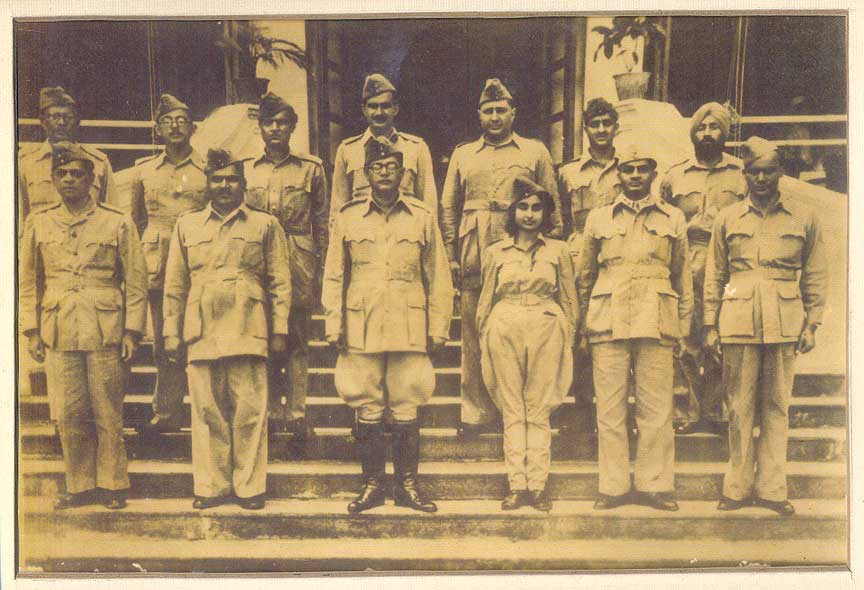
Captain Lakshmi (third from front-right) with Subhash Chandra Bose

In 1942, during the surrender of Singapore by the British to the Japanese, Lakshmi aided wounded prisoners of war, many of whom were interested in forming an Indian independence army. Singapore at this time had several nationalist Indians working there including K. P. Kesava Menon, S. C. Guha and N. Raghavan, who formed a Council of Action. Their Indian National Army, or Azad Hind Fauj, however, received no firm commitments or approval from the occupying Japanese forces regarding their participation in the war.

It was then that Subhash Chandra Bose arrived in Singapore on 2 July 1943, and reorganized the movement. Lakshmi Sahgal wrote later,

At the second mass meeting, Netaji [Bose] dropped a bombshell by saying that it was his intention to form a women's infantry regiment, named after the Rani of Jhansi who had fought so heroically against the British in 1857… I told him I was ready to join... The date was July 8, 1943.

Sahgal was able to convince INA members to arrange a private meeting with Bose. After speaking for over five hours, Bose gave her six days to rally the women. She then rallied 6000 women in Singapore. Bose addressed them in Hindustani and she translated his speech into Tamil or Malayalam for them. At the end of the speech, when he asked for volunteers, they all rushed forward to show their support. The Rani Jhasi Regiment was formed on the next day under Sahgal's leadership. She then came to be known as "Captain Lakshmi", even though her rank in the INA was Lieutenant Colonel.

Captain Lakshmi was the Minister in Charge of Women's Organization in the Provisional Government of Free India led by Subash Chandra Bose in Singapore.

She also cut a record, singing two songs, "Delhi chalo…" and "Jaya ho jai…" some time in the 1940s to raise money for the INA Relief Fund. "Delhi chalo…" was a marching song that was sung by soldiers of the INA during their training and when marching to battle, and was inspired by the song "Kaise Chhipoge Ab Tum Kaise…" featuring Leela Chitnis in the 1940 film Bandhan. It began in Hindi and then continued in Tamil. "Jaya ho jai…" was the national anthem of the Provisional Government of Free India and is extracted from the complete version of Rabindranath Tagore's Jana Gana Mana.

Sahgal toured Malaya, Kuala Lumpur and Singapore multiple times to recruit more people. The Regiment trained in Singapore for three months before they went to Burma for some field training. They were ordered to help the rest of the INA, which was marching to Imphal in 1944. While Aung San and his Burma Independent Army allowed the INA to move through Burma without any problems, the INA were hindered in their long march from Rangoon to Imphal by early rains. They fought British troops multiple times. Over time they captured Manipur and all the way to Jorhat. The incessant rains hindered the progress of the INA, which had to face snakes, insects and poisonous snakes. They were also facing a shortage of food and thus had to rely on eating leaves and the naturally growing jackfruits in the Burmese forests. Many suffered from diarrhea and malaria. During this period, Sahgal used her medical expertise to treat the soldiers.

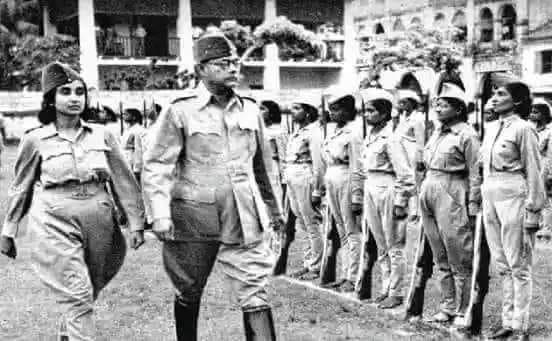
Captain Lakshmi Sahgal alongside Subhas Chandra Bose as part of the Indian National Army

The INA was accompanied by the Imperial Japanese Army in December 1944. By March 1945, with the tide of war turning against them, the INA leadership decided to beat a retreat before they could enter Imphal.

While settled in an INA hospital on the Burma border in Shah Estate, Bose met Captain Lakshmi and asked her and the Regiment to retreat to Malaya but she refused. The hospital was bombed the day he left, leading to the death of many patients. As the survivors attempted to escape to Rangoon in bullock carts, they were besieged by the British guerilla forces.

Captain Lakshmi was arrested by the British in eastern Burma in May 1945. She and the other prisoners were forced to walk 100 miles (160 km) from the Karen Hills to Toungoo, which took ten days. She remained in Burma, aiding the wounded, until March 1946, when she was sent to India – at a time when the INA trials in Delhi heightened popular discontent with and hastened the end of colonial rule.

== Social work ==
During the Bangladesh liberation war, Sahgal organised relief camps and medical aid in Calcutta for refugees who streamed into India from Bangladesh, after a call for medical doctors from Jyoti Basu, the then Chief Minister of West Bengal. She then joined the Peoples' Relief Committee and went to the India-Bangaldesh border, accompanied by the medical team.

She led a medical team to Bhopal after the gas tragedy in December 1984, worked towards restoring peace in Kanpur following the anti-Sikh riots of 1984 and was arrested for her participation in a campaign against the Miss World competition in Bangalore in 1996. She was still seeing patients regularly at her clinic in Kanpur in 2006, at the age of 92.

== Political career ==
In 1972, Lakshmi joined the Communist Party of India (Marxist) (CPI(M)), following her daughter Subhashini Ali. She was one of the founding members of All India Democratic Women's Association in 1981 and led many of its activities and campaigns. She was also a member of the Central Committee of the Communist Party of India (Marxist).

In the 2002 Indian presidential election, four leftist parties – the Communist Party of India, the Communist Party of India (Marxist), the Revolutionary Socialist Party, and the All India Forward Bloc – nominated Sahgal as a candidate in the presidential elections. She was the sole opponent of A.P.J. Abdul Kalam, who emerged victorious. She thus became the first female presidential candidate in India.

== Personal life ==
Lakshmi married Prem Kumar Sahgal in March 1947 in Lahore. After their marriage, they settled in Kanpur, where she continued with her medical practice and aided the refugees who were arriving in large numbers following the Partition of India. Prem took a job in a textile mill. He died in 1992. They had two daughters: Subhashini Ali and Anisa Puri.

Subhashini is a prominent communist politician and labour activist. According to Ali, Lakshmi was an atheist. The filmmaker Shaad Ali is her grandson.

Lakshmi published an autobiography, A Revolutionary Life: Memoirs of a Political Activist.

== Death ==
On 19 July 2012, Sahgal had a cardiac arrest and died on 23 July 2012 at 11:20 A.M. at the age of 97 at Kanpur. Her body was donated to Ganesh Shankar Vidyarthi Memorial Medical College for medical research.

== Awards ==
In 1998, Sahgal was awarded the Padma Vibhushan by Indian president K. R. Narayanan. In 2010, she was bestowed with honorary doctorate by University of Calicut.

== In popular culture ==
Rajeshwari Sachdev played the role of Captain Sahgal in 2004 film Netaji Subhas Chandra Bose: The Forgotten Hero. Shruthi Seth played the role of Sahgal in 2020 Amazon Prime Video series The Forgotten Army - Azaadi Ke Liye.

== See also ==
- Indian National Army
- Janaky Athi Nahappan
- Rasammah Bhupalan
- Ethnic communities in Kanpur
