= Mythili Sivaraman =

Indian communist and women's rights activist (1939–2021)

Personal details
- Born: 14 December 1939 Kakinada, Madras Presidency, British India
- Died: 30 May 2021 (aged 81) Chennai, Tamil Nadu, India
- Party: Communist Party of India (Marxist)
- Education: Syracuse University

Mythili Sivaraman (14 December 1939 – 30 May 2021) was an Indian women's rights and trade union activist. She was a co-founder of All India Democratic Women's Association and leader in the Communist Party of India (Marxist). Through her writings and activism she brought attention to the Keezhvenmani massacre of 1968 and the Vachati mass rape cases of 1992. She led efforts to drive women's empowerment, particularly of women from the disadvantaged communities, and trade union and labour activism. She was a contributor to Economic and Political Weekly, and wrote for publications including Mainstream and the Radical Review.

== Biography ==
Sivaraman was born on 14 December 1939 in Kakinada in present-day Indian state of Andhra Pradesh. She completed her higher education from the Syracuse University in the United States. She worked as a research assistant in the Permanent Mission of India to the UN (between 1966 and 1968). During this time she was involved in research related to non-self-governing territories. She also participated in the Anti-Vietnam war movement. At the end of her stint at the UN, she returned to India to work with the left and became a trade union organizer and women's rights activist working with women in the Indian state of Tamil Nadu.

She was a co-founder of the All India Democratic Women's Association (AIDWA) with women's leader and fellow activist Pappa Umanath. She later served the organization as its vice-president. She was also a trade union activist affiliated with the Centre of Indian Trade Unions (CITU). She was also a member of the Indian political party Communist Party of India (Marxist). She also served the party as a member of its Tamil Nadu state committee.

Sivaraman played a major role in publicizing the atrocities of the Keezhvenmani massacre of 1968 and bringing the incident to international attention through her articles and essays. Sivaraman was amongst the first to visit the site of death of forty-four dalit women agricultural laborers and children who were killed when they were leading a strike demanding higher wages. Her writings documented the arson committed by upper caste groups. A collection of her articles and essays about the incident was released as a book named Haunted by Fire: Essays on Caste, Class, Exploitation and Emancipation. Sivaraman also played a crucial role in Vachathi mass rape case of 1992, where officials from the forest and revenue departments as well as the police departments raped and assaulted tribal women and young girls in the village of Vachathi in Dharmapuri district of Tamil Nadu. She interviewed many rape victims and documented the facts and represented the case before the National Commission for Schedule Castes and Schedule Tribes. Her petition to the commission resulted in the case being investigated by the Central Bureau of Investigation leading to justice after over 19 years of trials in the courts.

Through her writings and ground root activism, Sivaraman contributed towards women's empowerment, particularly women from disadvantaged communities. She argued against the political and economic structures in the country, which she viewed as being concentrated in the hands of few in the upper classes, further perpetuating the economic and political inequalities and placing women at a significant disadvantage both along with social mobility as well as economic mobility. Her social justice themed works were published in the Economic and Political Weekly, and other publications including the Mainstream, and the Radical Review. She co-founded the socialist periodical Radical Review in 1969 along with lawyer turned politician P. Chidambaram and journalist N. Ram. The publication ceased in 1973. Some of the other topics that Sivaraman wrote on included the agrarian crisis, the Dravidian movement, and workers unions and labour issues. She reported on the MRF strikes in 1970s, the Ashok Leyland labour crises, and the strikes at Tablets India.

A film based on Sivaraman's life and activism, Fragments of the Past, was made by film-maker and historian Uma Chakravarti in 2013.

== Personal life ==
Sivaraman was married to Karunakaran. The couple had a daughter. She suffered with Alzheimer's disease for over ten years prior to her death. She died from COVID-19 on 30 May 2021, at the age of 81.

== Bibliography ==
- Sivaraman, Maitili (1993). Pengalum Madhasaarbinmaiyum (in Tamil). South Asian Books.
- Sivaraman, Mythili (1997). Peṇṇurimai: cila pārvaikaḷ (in Tamil). Tamil̲p Puttakālayam.
- Sivaraman, Maitili (1998). Samugam - Oru Maru Paarvai (in Tamil). Tamil̲p Puttakālayam.
- Sivaraman, Maitili (2005). Aan Kuzhandai than venduma (in Tamil). Tamil̲p Puttakālayam.
- Sivaraman, Maitili (2005). alvithuraiyal, varumaiyal nasukkapadum kuzhandaigal (in Tamil). Bharathi Puttakālayam.
- Sivaraman, Mythily (2006). Kastūrpā, Makātmāvin̲ man̲aivi el̲uppum kēḷvikaḷ (in Tamil). Bharathi Puthakalayam. ISBN 978-81-89909-16-1.
- Sivaraman, Mythily (2006). Venmani, Orru Kaalathin Pathivu (in Tamil). Bharathi Puthakalayam. ISBN 978-81-89909-07-9.
- Sivaraman, Mythili (2006). Fragments of a Life: A Family Archive. Zubaan. ISBN 978-81-89013-11-0.
- Sivaraman, Mythily (2013). Haunted by Fire: Essays on Caste, Class, Exploitation and Emancipation. LeftWord Books. ISBN 978-93-80118-18-5.
- Some of her favourite things Frontline magazine, 25 February 2006
