= Ammu Swaminathan =

Indian politician

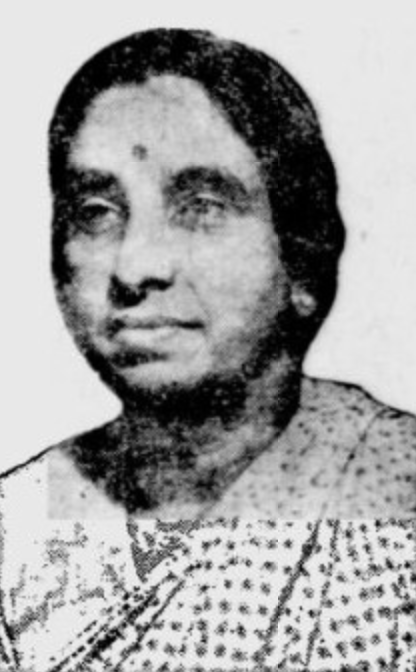

Member of Parliament, Lok Sabha
- In office 1951 – 1957
- Prime Minister: Pandit Jawaharlal Nehru
- Preceded by: Office established
- Succeeded by: M. Gulam Mohideen
- Constituency: Dindigul

2nd President of the Bharat Scouts and Guides
- In office November 1960 – March 1965
- Preceded by: Mangal Das Pakvasa
- Succeeded by: Justice Bhuvaneshwar Prasad Sinha

Personal details
- Born: 22 April 1894 Anakkara, Malabar District, Madras Presidency, British India (present day Palakkad, Kerala, India)
- Died: 4 July 1978 (aged 84) Palakkad, Kerala, India
- Party: Indian National Congress
- Spouse: Subbarama Swaminathan
- Relations: Swaminathan family
- Children: Govind Swaminadhan; Lakshmi Sahgal; Mrinalini Sarabhai; Subbaram
- Profession: Politician

Ammu Swaminathan or A. V. Ammakuti (22 April 1894 – 4 July 1978) was an Indian social worker and political activist during the Indian independence movement and a member of the Constituent Assembly of India.

== Early life ==
Ammukutty Swaminadhan was born into the Vadakkath family of Anakkara in Ponnani taluk, Kerala. Her father, Govinda Menon, was a minor local official. Both of Ammu's parents belonged to the Nair caste, and she was the youngest of their thirteen children, which included nine daughters. Ammu never went to school and received only a rudimentary education at home, which consisted of minimal reading and writing in Malayalam, cooking and keeping house, to prepare her for married life. She lost her father at a very young age, and her mother struggled to raise her children and arrange marriages for her many daughters. Resultantly, when Ammu was 13, her mother arranged an alliance for her which conformed to the Sambandam system which was well accepted in Kerala society at that time. Her spouse was Subbarama Swaminathan, an Kerala Iyer Brahmin who was more than twenty years older than Ammu.

== Married life ==
Subbarama Swaminathan, born into a middle-class Kerala Iyer family, had struggled hard in his early life to gain an education and rise above his situation. He had studied with scholarships at the universities of Edinburgh and London. His extended stay abroad and financial situation had prevented him from marrying until he was in his mid-30s. The arrival of the very young and sheltered Ammu fulfilled deep emotional needs for Subbarama and he devoted a large part of his life to nurturing her development in every way. Indeed, he formally married Ammu at a registry office in London at a later point. This was necessary because Sambandam relationships, while traditionally acknowledged, did not constitute marriage and the children of such a union belonged only to the family of their mother and not their father. Even the registered marriage in London did not change people's attitudes, or the way the family was received in society: both of Ammu's daughters were to recount in their memoirs that while their father's family acknowledged them (as was traditional) by including them at family events such as weddings, they would be served their food separately from other family members, and subtle distinctions would be evident in the way they were treated.

The legally valid wedding in the London registry office did have one definite result: the abandonment of the matrilineal Marumakkathayam system and the severance of affiliation with the Vadakkath family and the matrilineal Nair community to which Ammu and her parents had belonged. Henceforth, she and her children would be known by the name of their husband/father. Thus, the family came to be known by the name Swaminathan.

She was elected as 'Mother of The Year' in 1975 on the inauguration of International Women's Year.

== Personal life ==
Ammu Swaminathan had four children, including Govind Swaminadhan, who served as the Advocate-General of Tamil Nadu from 1969 to 1976,, Captain Lakshmi Swaminathan (1914–2012) a medical doctor and a revolutionary of the Indian independence movement and an officer of the Indian National Army and noted classical dancer Mrinalini Sarabhai. Captain Lakshmi Swaminathan was also a member of the Rajya Sabha and was nominated as a presidential candidate in 2002.

Lok Sabha
Preceded by Office Established	Member of Parliament for Dindigul; 1952 — 1957	Succeeded by M. Gulam Mohideen
Honorary titles
Preceded by Mangal Das Pakvasa	Presidents of the Bharat Scouts and Guides; November 1960 — March 1965	Succeeded by Justice Bhuvaneshwar Prasad Sinha
