= Swaminathan family =

Indian family

The Swaminathan family is an Indian family, prominent in public affairs. Its members include:

- Subbarama Swaminathan, advocate
- Ammu Swaminathan (his wife), social activist and politician
  - Lakshmi Sehgal (his daughter), freedom fighter and presidential candidate
  - Prem Sehgal (his son-in-law), soldier and officer Indian National Army
    - Subhashini Ali, (his granddaughter), communist politician
      - Shaad Ali, (his great-grandson), Bollywood filmmaker
  - Mrinalini Sarabhai (his daughter), dancer
  - Vikram Sarabhai (his son-in-law), scientist
    - Mallika Sarabhai, (his granddaughter), dancer and activist
    - Kartikeya Sarabhai (his grandson), environmental activist
  - Govind Swaminadhan (his son)
    - Srilatha Swaminathan (his granddaughter)

== See also ==
- Sarabhai family
