= Jaggula John Wesley =

Politician from Telangana, India

Secretary of Communist Party of India (Marxist), Telangana
- Incumbent
- Assumed office 29 January 2025
- Preceded by: Tammineni Veerabhadram

Member of Central Committee, Communist Party of India (Marxist)
- Incumbent
- Assumed office 6 April 2025

Personal details
- Party: Communist Party of India (Marxist)
- Occupation: Politician

Jaggula John Wesley is a communist politician from Amarchinta, Telangana, India. He is the current state secretary of the CPI (Marxist), Telangana. Wesley, a Madiga by caste, is the first Dalit person to hold this position in the Telugu states. He is a member of the 24th Central Committee of the CPI (M) and the state president of Kula Vivaksha Vyatireka Porata Samithi, a movement against Caste-based discrimination.

== Political career ==
He started his journey into politics in 1990s with Radical Students Union. He joined the CPI (Marxist) in 1996 and held leadership positions in the Democratic Youth Federation of India.
