= Dindigul Assembly constituency =

Indian Legislative Assembly Constituency

Coordinates: 10.35°N 77.95°E

Dindigul
- Constituency No. 132 for the Tamil Nadu Legislative Assembly

Constituency details
- Country: India
- Region: South India
- State: Tamil Nadu
- District: Dindigul
- Lok Sabha constituency: Dindigul
- Established: 1951
- Total electors: 2,42,126
- Reservation: None

Member of Legislative Assembly
- 17th Tamil Nadu Legislative Assembly
- Incumbent I. P. Senthil Kumar
- Party: DMK
- Alliance: SPA
- Elected year: 2026

Dindigul is a state assembly constituency in Tamil Nadu. Its Constituency number is 132 among the 234 State Legislative Assembly Constituencies. It comes under Dindigul Lok Sabha constituency. Dindigul was one of 17 assembly constituencies to have VVPAT facility with EVMs in the 2016 Tamil Nadu Legislative Assembly election.

== Members of Legislative Assembly ==
=== Madras State ===
Year	Winner	Party
1952	Munisamy Pillai	Indian National Congress
1957	M. J. Jamal Mohideen	Indian National Congress
1962	R. Rengasamy	Indian National Congress
1967	A. Balasubramaniam	Communist Party of India (Marxist)

=== Tamil Nadu ===
Year	Winner	Party
1971	O. N. Sundaram Pillai	Indian National Congress
1977	N. Varadarajan	Communist Party of India (Marxist)
1980	N. Varadarajan	Independent
1984	A. Premkumar	All India Anna Dravida Munnetra Kazhagam
1989	S. A. Thangarajan	Communist Party of India (Marxist)
1991	B. Nirmala	All India Anna Dravida Munnetra Kazhagam
1996	R. Manimaran	Dravida Munnetra Kazhagam
2001	K. Nagalakshimi	Communist Party of India (Marxist)
2006	K. Balabharathi	Communist Party of India (Marxist)
2011	K. Balabharathi	Communist Party of India (Marxist)
2016	Dindigul C. Sreenivasan	All India Anna Dravida Munnetra Kazhagam
2021	Dindigul C. Sreenivasan	All India Anna Dravida Munnetra Kazhagam
2026	Senthilkumar.I.P	Dravida Munnetra Kazhagam

== Election results ==
Vote share of winning candidates
2026	35.13%
2021	46.86%
2016	49.30%
2011	58.82%
2006	43.74%
2001	47.37%
1996	65.53%
1991	64.00%
1989	37.77%
1984	62.68%
1980	54.89%
1977	45.19%
1971	39.80%
1967	58.93%
1962	48.23%
1957	48.36%
1952	43.95%

=== 2026 ===
2026 Tamil Nadu Legislative Assembly election: Dindigul
Party	Candidate	Votes	%	±%
DMK	Senthilkumar.I.P	74,489	35.13	New
TVK	G. Nazeer Raja	73,358	34.60	New
AIADMK	Sreenivasan.C	53,986	25.46	▼21.40
NTK	Mutharasi.S	7,299	3.44	▼4.25
NOTA	NOTA	833	0.39	▼0.54
Margin of victory		1,131	0.53	▼8.65
Turnout		2,12,024	87.57	▲17.68
Registered electors		2,42,126		▼34,457
DMK gain from AIADMK		Swing	New	

=== 2021 ===
2021 Tamil Nadu Legislative Assembly election: Dindigul
Party	Candidate	Votes	%	±%
AIADMK	C. Sreenivasan	90,595	46.86	−2.44
CPI(M)	N. Pandi	72,848	37.68	33.02
NTK	R. Jayasundar	14,860	7.69	6.49
MNM	R. Rajendran	9,063	4.69	New
AMMK	P. Ramuthevar	2,427	1.26	New
NOTA	Nota	1,807	0.93	−0.57
Margin of victory		17,747	9.18	−1.99
Turnout		193,311	69.89	−4.65
Rejected ballots		348	0.18	
Registered electors		276,583		
AIADMK hold		Swing	-2.44	

=== 2016 ===
2016 Tamil Nadu Legislative Assembly election: Dindigul
Party	Candidate	Votes	%	±%
AIADMK	C. Sreenivasan	91,413	49.30	
DMK	M. Basheer Ahamed	70,694	38.13	
CPI(M)	N. Pandi	8,657	4.67	−54.15
BJP	T. A. Thirumalai Balaji	5,079	2.74	−1.16
NOTA	None Of The Above	2,783	1.50	New
PMK	R. Parasuraman	2,718	1.47	New
NTK	M. P. Ganesan	2,227	1.20	New
Margin of victory		20,719	11.17	−15.29
Turnout		185,419	74.54	−2.25
Registered electors		248,751		
AIADMK gain from CPI(M)		Swing	-9.51	

=== 2011 ===
2011 Tamil Nadu Legislative Assembly election: Dindigul
Party	Candidate	Votes	%	±%
CPI(M)	K. Balabharathi	86,932	58.82	15.08
PMK	J. Paul Baskar	47,817	32.35	
BJP	P. G. Bose	5,761	3.90	2.50
ABHM	V. Ganesan	2,014	1.36	New
Independent	M. Palanichamy	1,107	0.75	New
RSP	M. Muthuveeran	945	0.64	New
BSP	P. Baskaran	711	0.48	−0.36
IJK	S. Nndharan	586	0.40	New
Independent	M. Nagoorgani	502	0.34	New
Independent	A. Abuthahir	271	0.18	New
Independent	A. Nagakanniga	270	0.18	New
Margin of victory		39,115	26.46	14.06
Turnout		192,479	76.79	6.79
Registered electors		147,805		
CPI(M) hold		Swing	15.08	

=== 2006 ===
2006 Tamil Nadu Legislative Assembly election: Dindigul
Party	Candidate	Votes	%	±%
CPI(M)	K. Balabharathi	66,811	43.74	−3.63
MDMK	N. Selvaragavan	47,862	31.33	28.22
DMDK	G. Karthikeyan	27,287	17.86	New
SP	J. C. D. Prabhakar	2,970	1.94	New
BJP	T. A. Thirumalai Balaji	2,134	1.40	New
BSP	K. Sivanathan	1,290	0.84	New
RSP	M. Muthuveeran	1,154	0.76	New
PNK	M. Arunachalam	1,107	0.72	New
Independent	A. Palanichamy	1,045	0.68	New
AIFB	S. Thanikodi	632	0.41	New
JD(U)	N. Naguchamy Nadar	456	0.30	New
Margin of victory		18,949	12.41	10.55
Turnout		152,748	70.00	16.40
Registered electors		218,221		
CPI(M) hold		Swing	-3.63	

=== 2001 ===
2001 Tamil Nadu Legislative Assembly election: Dindigul
Party	Candidate	Votes	%	±%
CPI(M)	K. Nagalakshimi	71,003	47.37	40.30
DMK	M. Basheer Ahmed	68,224	45.52	−20.01
MDMK	Latha Selvaraj	4,662	3.11	New
Independent	R. Manimaran	2,635	1.76	New
Independent	V. Muruganandam	1,685	1.12	New
Thaayaga Makkal Katchi	S. N. Balasubramani	1,668	1.11	New
Margin of victory		2,779	1.85	−43.38
Turnout		149,877	53.60	−11.77
Registered electors		279,805		
CPI(M) gain from DMK		Swing	-18.16	

=== 1996 ===
1996 Tamil Nadu Legislative Assembly election: Dindigul
Party	Candidate	Votes	%	±%
DMK	R. Manimaran	94,353	65.53	
AIADMK	V. Marutharaj	29,229	20.30	−43.70
CPI(M)	R. S. Rejendran	10,180	7.07	−22.07
PMK	S. Visuvasam	4,120	2.86	New
BJP	S. T. Manickam	3,488	2.42	−1.23
Independent	M. Rengan Maruthai	252	0.18	New
Independent	S. R. Subramani	243	0.17	New
Independent	M. Raj	199	0.14	New
CPI(ML)L	V. Kulanthai	172	0.12	New
Independent	R. Desikachari	149	0.10	New
Independent	K. Palanisamy	140	0.10	New
Margin of victory		65,124	45.23	10.37
Turnout		143,986	65.37	5.28
Registered electors		230,348		
DMK gain from AIADMK		Swing	1.53	

=== 1991 ===
1991 Tamil Nadu Legislative Assembly election: Dindigul
Party	Candidate	Votes	%	±%
AIADMK	B. Nirmala	80,795	64.00	43.93
CPI(M)	S. A. Thangarajan	36,791	29.14	−8.63
BJP	K. Dhanabalan	4,617	3.66	2.83
PMK	R. Sundar Rajan	2,588	2.05	New
JP	V. Abdulkadar	327	0.26	New
Independent	R. Selvaraj	197	0.16	New
Independent	P. M. Mustafa	172	0.14	New
Independent	K. Palani Chamy	155	0.12	New
Independent	P. Rengieya	138	0.11	New
Independent	S. Sebastian	131	0.10	New
Independent	A. Adhimoolam	121	0.10	New
Margin of victory		44,004	34.85	20.43
Turnout		126,250	60.09	−8.04
Registered electors		215,517		
AIADMK gain from CPI(M)		Swing	26.23	

=== 1989 ===
1989 Tamil Nadu Legislative Assembly election: Dindigul
Party	Candidate	Votes	%	±%
CPI(M)	S. A. Thangarajan	46,617	37.77	
INC	M. Sandhana Mary	28,815	23.34	
AIADMK	K. A. Krishnasamy	24,763	20.06	−42.62
AIADMK	A. Premkumar	17,445	14.13	−48.55
Independent	P. Selvan Nadar	1,490	1.21	New
BJP	K. Muthukrishnan Kailai	1,016	0.82	New
Independent	A. Stepan	1,001	0.81	New
Independent	P. Subbiah	312	0.25	New
Independent	R. Raju	280	0.23	New
Independent	R. Jeyaraman	270	0.22	New
Independent	M. Viswa Bharathi	238	0.19	New
Margin of victory		17,802	14.42	−15.91
Turnout		123,435	68.13	−1.46
Registered electors		184,923		
CPI(M) gain from AIADMK		Swing	-24.91	

=== 1984 ===
1984 Tamil Nadu Legislative Assembly election: Dindigul
Party	Candidate	Votes	%	±%
AIADMK	A. Premkumar	67,718	62.68	
CPI	N. Varadarajan	34,952	32.35	
Independent	Pon. Srinivasan	3,842	3.56	New
Independent	F. Ananth	505	0.47	New
Independent	P. Madurai Veeran	462	0.43	New
Independent	N. Madharasa	243	0.22	New
Independent	B. Subbiah	202	0.19	New
Independent	S. Muthukrishnan	115	0.11	New
Margin of victory		32,766	30.33	18.87
Turnout		108,039	69.58	5.36
Registered electors		160,905		
AIADMK gain from Independent		Swing	7.78	

=== 1980 ===
1980 Tamil Nadu Legislative Assembly election: Dindigul
Party	Candidate	Votes	%	±%
Independent	N. Varadarajan	55,195	54.89	New
INC	N. Abdul Khader	43,676	43.44	
Independent	V. Pitchaimuthu	674	0.67	New
Independent	P. M. Musthafa	589	0.59	New
Independent	S. Muthukrishnan	413	0.41	New
Margin of victory		11,519	11.46	−15.27
Turnout		100,547	64.22	11.03
Registered electors		158,089		
Independent gain from CPI(M)		Swing	9.71	

=== 1977 ===
1977 Tamil Nadu Legislative Assembly election: Dindigul
Party	Candidate	Votes	%	±%
CPI(M)	N. Varadarajan	33,614	45.19	
DMK	V. S. Lakshmanan	13,732	18.46	New
JP	V. Johnson	12,179	16.37	New
CPI	V. Madanagopal	11,125	14.96	New
Independent	A. Gnanaraj	2,357	3.17	New
Independent	M. M. Renganathan	1,380	1.86	New
Margin of victory		19,882	26.73	24.73
Turnout		74,387	53.19	−16.15
Registered electors		141,172		
CPI(M) gain from INC		Swing	5.38	

=== 1971 ===
1971 Tamil Nadu Legislative Assembly election: Dindigul
Party	Candidate	Votes	%	±%
INC	O. N. Sundaram Pillai	27,775	39.80	−1.27
Independent	Jama Hussain	26,384	37.81	New
CPI(M)	A. Balasubramanyam	14,990	21.48	New
Independent	C. Kasthurinathan	629	0.90	New
Margin of victory		1,391	1.99	−15.87
Turnout		69,778	69.33	−9.20
Registered electors		110,295		
INC gain from CPI(M)		Swing	-19.12	

=== 1967 ===
1967 Madras Legislative Assembly election: Dindigul
Party	Candidate	Votes	%	±%
CPI(M)	A. Balasubramanayam	42,381	58.93	
INC	O. C. Pillai	29,537	41.07	−7.16
Margin of victory		12,844	17.86	13.54
Turnout		71,918	78.54	1.16
Registered electors		94,204		
CPI(M) gain from INC		Swing	10.70	

=== 1962 ===
1962 Madras Legislative Assembly election: Dindigul
Party	Candidate	Votes	%	±%
INC	R. Rengaswamy	32,047	48.23	−0.13
CPI	A. Balasubramanian	29,174	43.91	
Independent	M. Nallakamu	2,708	4.08	New
SWA	S. Rajaram	2,517	3.79	New
Margin of victory		2,873	4.32	−1.95
Turnout		66,446	77.38	29.89
Registered electors		89,114		
INC hold		Swing	-0.13	

=== 1957 ===
1957 Madras Legislative Assembly election: Dindigul
Party	Candidate	Votes	%	±%
INC	M. J. Jamal Mohideen	21,417	48.36	4.41
CPI	A. Balasubramaniam	18,640	42.09	New
Independent	R. Janardhanam Naidu	2,922	6.60	New
Independent	M. V. Pichaya	1,311	2.96	New
Margin of victory		2,777	6.27	0.79
Turnout		44,290	47.48	−10.75
Registered electors		93,280		
INC hold		Swing	4.41	

=== 1952 ===
1952 Madras Legislative Assembly election: Dindigul
Party	Candidate	Votes	%	±%
INC	Munisamy Pillai	16,667	43.95	43.95
CPI	A. Balasubramaniam	14,588	38.47	New
Independent	V. Venkatachalam	2,794	7.37	New
TTP	V. Arumugham	2,686	7.08	New
KMPP	K. Nagarattinam	1,188	3.13	New
Margin of victory		2,079	5.48	
Turnout		37,923	58.23	
Registered electors		65,129		
INC win (new seat)				
