= Govind Swaminadhan =

Indian lawyer (1909–2003)

Advocate General of Tamil Nadu
- In office 1969–1976
- Preceded by: Mohan Kumaramangalam
- Succeeded by: K. Parasaran

Personal details
- Born: 9 October 1909
- Died: 30 September 2003 (aged 93)
- Relations: Swaminathan family
- Children: Srilatha Swaminathan

Govind Swaminadhan (9 October 1909 – 30 September 2003) was an Indian lawyer who served as the Advocate-General of Tamil Nadu from 1969 to 1976. He also served as president of the Madras Bar Association.

== Early life and education ==
Govind was born on 9 October 1909 to lawyer Subbarama Swaminathan, and his wife Ammu Swaminathan. He was the oldest of four siblings, the others being Lakshmi Sehgal (1914-2012, Mrinalini Sarabhai (1918-2016) and Subbaram Swaminadhan. He had his education at Madras and Oxford and qualified as a barrister from the Inner Temple in 1935.

== Career ==
Govind practised at the Madras High Court serving as Crown Prosecutor and later as Standing Counsel for the Government of India. One of his important trials as Crown Prosecutor was the Lakshmikanthan Murder Case.

In 1969, Govind was appointed Advocate-General of Tamil Nadu during the tenure of the Dravida Munnetra Kazhagam government and served till 1976. Govind actively practised as a lawyer till 1997 when he was about 87 years old.

== Personal life ==
He was the father of Srilatha Swaminathan.
