= Dindigul C. Sreenivasan =

Indian politician (born 1948)

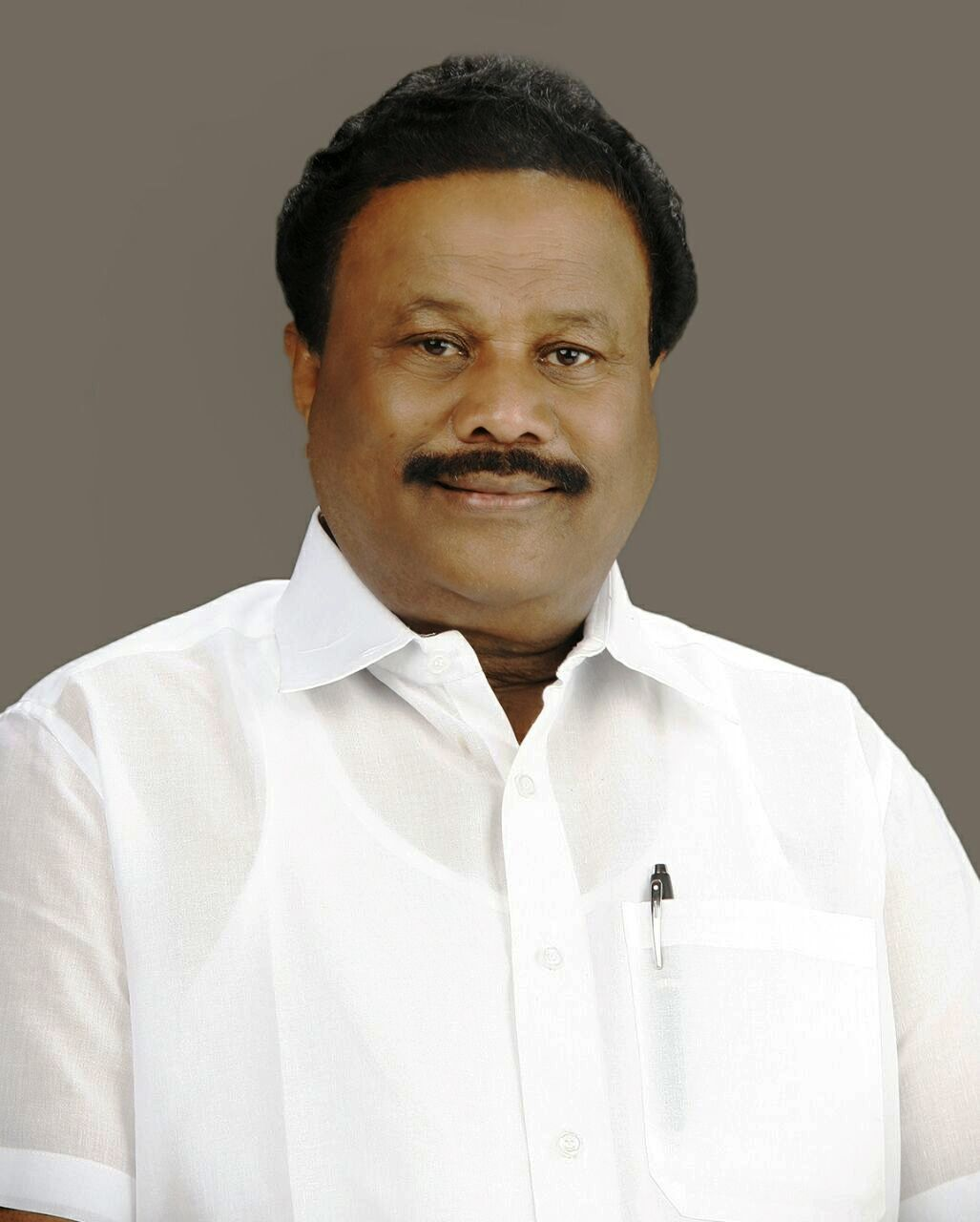

Minister of Forests
- In office 23 May 2016 – 6 May 2021
- Preceded by: Edappadi K. Palaniswami
- Succeeded by: K. Ramachandran
- Constituency: Dindigul

Member of the Tamil Nadu Legislative Assembly
- In office 16 May 2016 – 6 May 2026
- Preceded by: K. Balabharathi
- Succeeded by: I. P. Senthil Kumar
- Constituency: Dindigul

Member of Parliament, Lok Sabha
- In office 10 March 1998 – 16 May 2004
- Preceded by: N. S. V. Chitthan
- Succeeded by: N. S. V. Chitthan
- Constituency: Dindigul
- In office 29 November 1989 – 9 May 1996
- Preceded by: K. R. Natarajan
- Succeeded by: N. S. V. Chitthan
- Constituency: Dindigul

Treasurer of the All India Anna Dravida Munnetra Kazhagam
- Incumbent
- Assumed office 11 July 2022
- General Secretary: Edappadi K. Palaniswami
- Preceded by: O. Panneerselvam
- In office 14 February 2017 – 21 August 2017
- Preceded by: O. Panneerselvam
- Succeeded by: O. Panneerselvam
- In office 31 March 2000 – 20 July 2006
- General Secretary: J. Jayalalithaa
- Preceded by: Sedapatti Muthiah
- Succeeded by: T. T. V. Dhinakaran

Organizing Secretary of AIADMK
- In office 2020–2022

Personal details
- Born: 1 April 1948 (age 78) Usilampatti, Madras Province, India
- Party: AIADMK
- Spouses: S. Kannathal (m. 1974); S. Nageswari (m. 1979)
- Education: M.A (Political science), MBA
- Occupation: Politician

Dindigul C. Sreenivasan (born 1 April 1948) is an Indian politician and former four term Member of Parliament of India elected from Tamil Nadu. He served as Member of Legislative Assembly for Dindigul from 2016 to 2026. He is the treasurer of the All India Anna Dravida Munnetra Kazhagam (AIADMK) since 11 July 2022. He is one of senior most members of the party AIADMK. He served as Minister for Forests for Tamil Nadu from 2016 to 2021.

He was elected to the Lok Sabha from Dindigul constituency as an AIADMK candidate in the Indian general elections of 1989, 1991, 1998 and 1999 in Tamil Nadu.

Elected in Legislative Assembly Election 2016 and 2021 in Dindigul Assembly constituency for consecutive 2 terms, he belongs to Piramalai Kallar community.

Jayalalithaa appointed Sreenivasan as Minister for Forests in May 2016. This was his first cabinet post in the Government of Tamil Nadu.

On 11 July 2022, C. Sreenivasan was made treasurer of All India Anna Dravida Munnetra Kazhagam.
