= Central Committee of the Communist Party of India (Marxist) =

Overview
- Type: Highest decision-making organ when Party Congress is not in session.
- Elected by: Party Congress
- Length of term: Three years

History
- Established: by 7th Party Congress on 7 November 1964; 61 years ago

Leadership
- General Secretary: M.A. Baby
- Executive organ: Politburo
- Operational organ: Central Secretariat
- Disciplinary organ: Central Control Commission

Elections
- Last election: 6 April 2025

The Central Committee is the second-highest body of the Communist Party of India (Marxist). The members of the Central Committee are elected at the Congress of the Party, which occurs every three years.

== Elections ==
The All-India Party Congress, typically convened every three years, serves as the supreme authority of the CPI(M). Between sessions of the Party Congress, the Central Committee functions as the highest decision-making body. The Central Committee elects a Politburo from among its members, including the General Secretary, who is the party's principal leader.

== 24th Central Committee ==
=== Members ===
==== Party Centre ====
Name	Photo	Various positions	Remarks
M. A. Baby		General Secretary; Member of Polit Bureau	Old
B. V. Raghavulu		Member of Polit Bureau; Former Andhra Pradesh State Secretary	Old
Tapan Kumar Sen		Member of Polit Bureau; CITU National Vice President	Old
Nilotpal Basu		Member of Polit Bureau; Former SFI General Secretary	Old
A. Vijayaraghavan		Member of Polit Bureau	Old
Ashok Dhawale		Member of Polit Bureau	Old
Vijoo Krishnan			Old
Mariam Dhawale		Member of Polit Bureau	Old
R. Arun Kumar		Member of Polit Bureau; Former SFI All India President	Old
Viswanath Muralidharan			Old
Rajendra Sharma		Member of Central Secretariat; Editor of Loklahar	Old
K. Hemalata		CITU National Vice President	Old
Vikram Singh		Former SFI General Secretary	Old
K.N. Umesh		CITU National Secretary	Old
Elamaram Kareem			Old
A.R. Sindhu			Old
Sunkara Punyavati			Old
R. Karumalaiyan			Old
Mandhadapu Saibabu		Treasurer of CITU	New
Koninika Ghosh			New

==== Andhra Pradesh ====
Name	Photo	Various positions	Remarks
V. Srinivasa Rao		Andhra Pradesh State Secretary	Old
K. Lokanadham			New
D. Rama Devi			New

==== Assam ====
Name	Photo	Various positions	Remarks
Suprakash Talukdar		Assam State Secretary	Old
Isfaqur Rahman		Member of Assam State Secretariat	Old

==== Bihar ====
Name	Photo	Various positions	Remarks
Lalan Choudhary		Bihar State Secretary	Old
Awadhesh Kumar		Former Bihar State Secretary; AIKS National Joint Secretary	Old

==== Delhi ====
Name	Photo	Various positions	Remarks
Anurag Saxena		Delhi State Secretary; CITU Delhi State Secretary	New

==== Gujarat ====
Name	Photo	Various positions	Remarks
Hitendra Bhatt		Gujarat State Secretary	New

==== Haryana ====
Name	Photo	Various positions	Remarks
Prem Chand		Haryana State Secretary	New

==== Himachal Pradesh ====
Name	Photo	Various positions	Remarks
Sanjay Chauhan		Himachal Pradesh State Secretary; Former Mayor of Shimla Municipal Corporation	New

==== Jammu and Kashmir ====
Name	Photo	Various positions	Remarks
Mohammed Yousuf Tarigami			Old

==== Jharkhand ====
Name	Photo	Various positions	Remarks
Prakash Viplav		Jharkhand State Secretary	Old

==== Karnataka ====
Name	Photo	Various positions	Remarks
K. Prakash		Karnataka State Secretary	New

==== Kerala ====
Name	Photo	Various positions	Remarks
Pinarayi Vijayan		Member of Polit Bureau; Former Chief Minister of Kerala	Old
M. V. Govindan		Member of Polit Bureau; Kerala State Secretary	Old
P. K. Sreemathy			Old
E. P. Jayarajan			Old
T. M. Thomas Isaac			Old
K. K. Shailaja			Old
K. Radhakrishnan			Old
K. N. Balagopal			Old
P. Rajeeve			Old
P. Sathidevi			Old
C. S. Sujatha			Old
T. P. Ramakrishnan			New
Puthalath Dinesan			New
K. S. Saleekha			New

==== Madhya Pradesh ====
Name	Photo	Various positions	Remarks
Jaswinder Singh		Madhya Pradesh State Secretary	Old

==== Maharashtra ====
Name	Photo	Various positions	Remarks
Ajit Nawale		Maharashtra State Secretary	New
Vinod Bhiva Nikole			New

==== Odisha ====
Name	Photo	Various positions	Remarks
Suresh Chandra Panigrahy		Odisha State Secretary	New

==== Punjab ====
Name	Photo	Various positions	Remarks
Sukhwinder Singh Sekhon		Punjab State Secretary	Old

==== Rajasthan ====
Name	Photo	Various positions	Remarks
Amra Ram		Member of Polit Bureau; AIKS National Vice President; Former Rajasthan State Secretary; MP in Lok Sabha	Old
Kishan Pareek		Rajasthan State Secretary	New

==== Tamil Nadu ====
Name	Photo	Various positions	Remarks
K. Balakrishnan		Member of Polit Bureau; Former Tamil Nadu State Secretary	Old
U. Vasuki		Member of Polit Bureau	Old
P. Sampath			Old
P. Shanmugam			Old
N. Gunashekaran			New
K. Balabharathi			New

==== Telangana ====
Name	Photo	Various positions	Remarks
Tammineni Veerabhadram		Former Telangana State Secretary	Old
John Wesley		Telangana State Secretary	New
S. Veeraiah			New
T. Jyothi			New

==== Tripura ====
Name	Photo	Various positions	Remarks
Jitendra Choudhury		Member of Polit Bureau; Tripura State Secretary; LoP in Tripura Legislative Assembly	Old
Manik Dey			New
Naresh Jamatia			New
Ratan Bhowmik			New
Krishna Rakshit			New

==== Uttarakhand ====
Name	Photo	Various positions	Remarks
Rajendra Kumar Negi		Former Uttarakhand State Secretary	New

==== Uttar Pradesh ====
Name	Photo	Various positions	Remarks
Heera Lal Yadav		Former Uttar Pradesh State Secretary	Old

==== West Bengal ====
Name	Photo	Various positions	Remarks
Mohammed Salim		Member of Polit Bureau; West Bengal State Secretary	Old
Ram Chandra Dome		Member of Polit Bureau	Old
Srideep Bhattacharya		Member of Polit Bureau	Old
Sujan Chakraborty			Old
Abhas Roy Choudhary			Old
Samik Lahiri			Old
Sumit Dey			Old
Deblina Hembram			Old
Debabrata Ghosh			New
Syed Hussain			New
Minakshi Mukherjee			New
Saman Pathak			New

=== Permanent invitees ===
Name	Photo	Various positions
Sudip Dutta		
Bal Singh		
John Brittas		
Sudhanva Deshpande		

=== Special invitees ===
Name	Photo
Manik Sarkar	
Prakash Karat	
Brinda Karat	
Subhashini Ali	
S. Ramachandran Pillai	
Biman Bose	
Hannan Mollah	

=== Central Secretariat ===
Central Committee of CPI(M) elects a Central Secretariat, which manages the party's day-to-day operations and assists in the implementation of decisions taken by the Central Committee. Central Secretariat is guided by the Politburo.

In the first meeting of 24th Central Committee from 3-5 June 2025, a seven-member new Central Secretariat was elected.

Members of Central Secretariat
M.A. Baby	B.V. Raghavulu	V. Muralidharan	Rajendra Sharma	K. Hemalata	Vikram Singh	K.N. Umesh
