= 2002 Indian presidential election =

Election of A. P. J. Abdul Kalam

- 15 July 2002
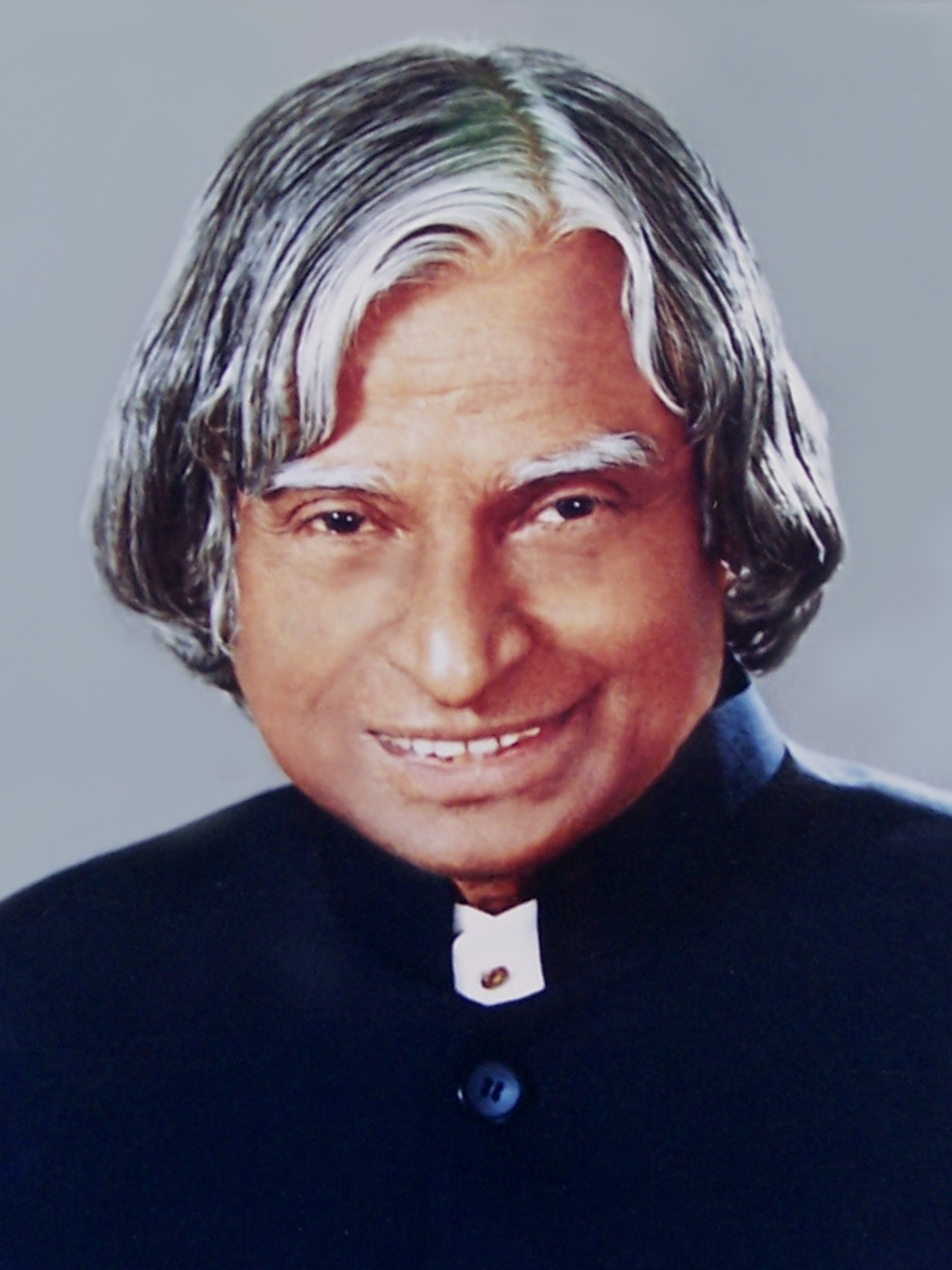

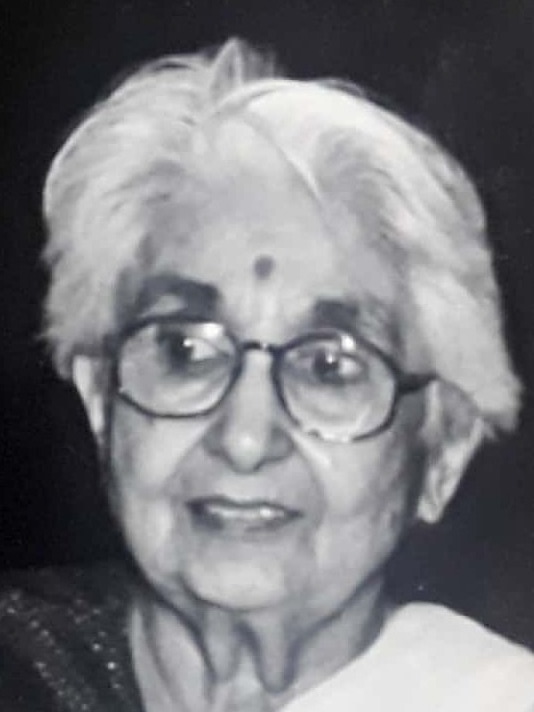
Nominee	A. P. J. Abdul Kalam	Lakshmi Sahgal
Party	Independent	CPI(M)
Alliance	NDA	Left Front
Home state	Tamil Nadu	Kerala
Electoral vote	922,884	107,366
States carried	26+NCT+PY	2
Percentage	89.58%	10.42%
President before election
K. R. Narayanan
INC
Elected President
A. P. J. Abdul Kalam
Independent

The 2002 Indian presidential election was held on 15 July 2002 to elect President of India. On 18 July 2002, the results were declared. A. P. J. Abdul Kalam became the 11th President by beating his nearest rival Lakshmi Sahgal.

== Candidates ==
The election was fought between two major candidates, A. P. J. Abdul Kalam and Lakshmi Sahgal.

=== National Democratic Alliance ===
Kalam was backed by the ruling Bharatiya Janata Party and its National Democratic Alliance. All India Anna Dravida Munnetra Kazhagam, Telugu Desam Party and Bahujan Samaj Party also supported his candidature. The major opposition party Indian National Congress, two days after the nomination, declared its support to Kalam's candidature.

Independent
For President

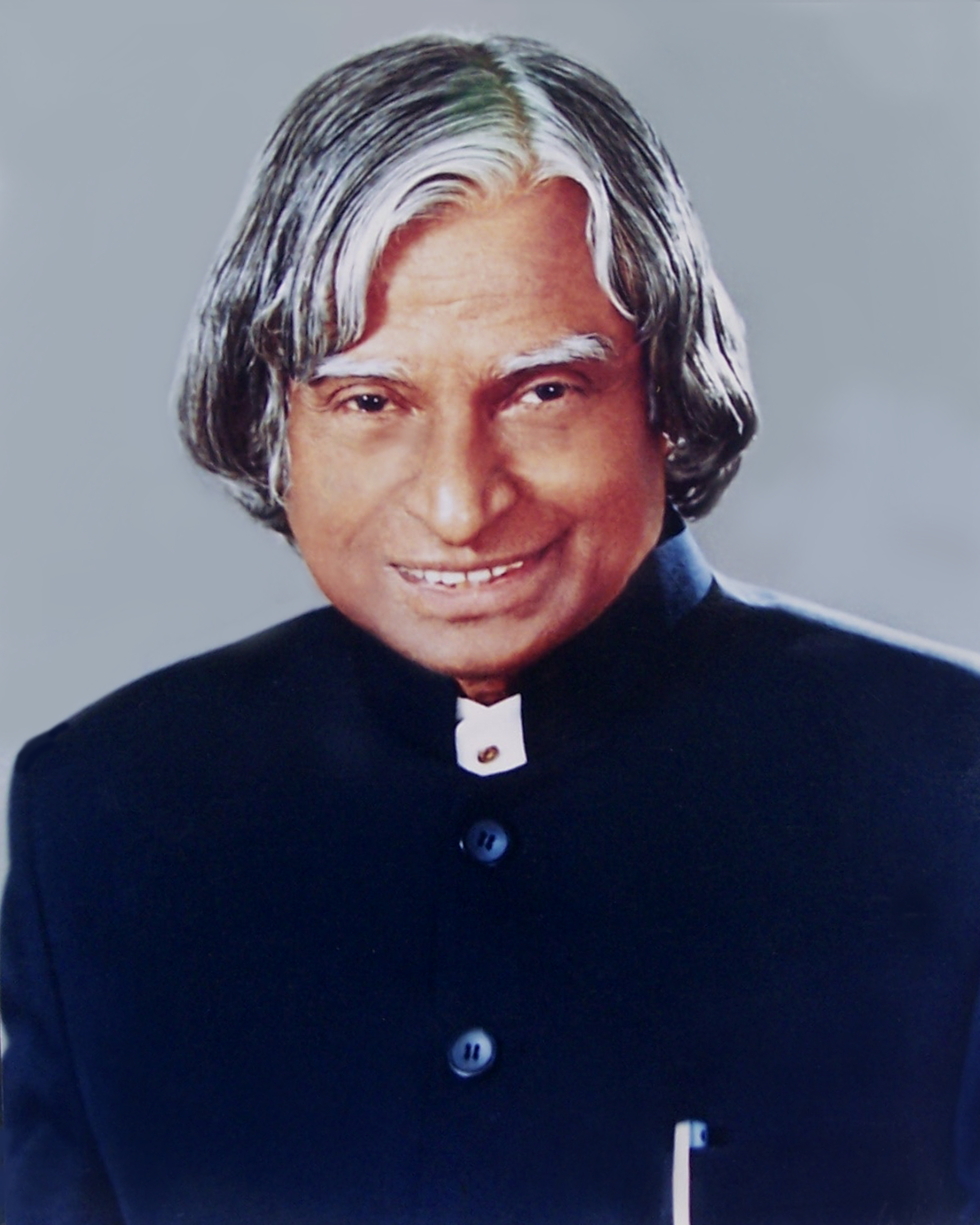

Scientist and Bharat Ratna awardee
A. P. J. Abdul Kalam

Independent

=== Left Front ===
Left Front were opposed to Kalam's candidature, and eventually nominated freedom fighter and Indian National Army's Rani of Jhansi Regiment commander Lakshmi Sahgal as their candidate.

Left Alliance
For President

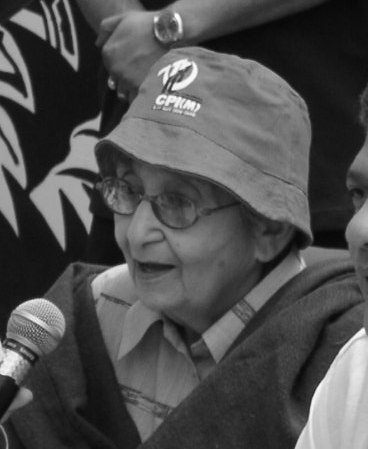

Independence activist
Lakshmi Sahgal

Communist Party of India (Marxist)

== Results ==
States	No. of MLA/MPs	Value of each Vote	Total (Votes)	Total (Values)	A. P. J. Abdul Kalam (Votes)	A. P. J. Abdul Kalam (Values)	Lakshmi Sahgal (Votes)	Lakshmi Sahgal (Values)	Invalid (Votes)	Invalid (Values)	Valid (Votes)	Valid (Values)
Members of Parliament	776	708	760	538,080	638	451,704	80	56,640	42	29,736	718	508,344
Andhra Pradesh	294	148	283	41,884	264	39,072	2	296	17	2,516	266	39,368
Arunachal Pradesh	60	8	57	456	57	456	0	0	0	0	57	456
Assam	126	116	119	13,804	113	13,108	1	116	5	580	114	13,224
Bihar	243	173	234	40,482	215	37,195	17	2,941	2	346	232	40,136
Chhattisgarh	90	129	90	11,610	85	10,965	0	0	5	645	85	10,965
Goa	40	20	39	780	34	680	3	60	2	40	37	740
Gujarat	182	147	179	26,313	174	25,578	2	294	3	441	176	25,872
Haryana	90	112	86	9,632	86	9,632	0	0	0	0	86	9,632
Himachal Pradesh	68	51	64	3,264	62	3,162	1	51	1	51	63	3,213
Jammu and Kashmir	87	72	78	5,616	72	5,184	2	144	4	288	74	5,328
Jharkhand	81	176	79	13,904	74	13,024	5	880	0	0	79	13,904
Karnataka	224	131	220	28,820	202	26,462	13	1,703	5	655	215	28,165
Kerala	140	152	138	20,976	97	14,744	39	5,928	2	304	136	20,672
Madhya Pradesh	230	131	229	29,999	216	28,296	2	262	11	1,441	218	28,558
Maharashtra	288	175	280	49,000	264	46,200	9	1,575	7	1,225	273	47,775
Manipur	60	18	58	1,044	50	900	4	72	4	72	54	972
Meghalaya	60	17	56	952	53	901	1	17	2	34	54	918
Mizoram	40	8	40	320	40	320	0	0	0	0	42	320
Nagaland	60	9	60	540	54	486	0	0	6	54	54	486
Orissa	147	149	146	21,754	130	19,370	12	1,788	4	596	142	21,158
Punjab	117	116	110	12,760	87	10,092	9	1,044	14	1,624	96	1,1136
Rajasthan	200	129	197	25,413	189	24,381	2	258	6	774	191	24,639
Sikkim	32	7	32	224	30	210	0	0	2	14	30	210
Tamil Nadu	234	176	233	41,111	217	38,192	10	1,760	6	1,056	227	39,952
Tripura	60	26	60	1,560	17	442	41	1,066	2	52	58	1,508
Uttarakhand	70	64	69	4,416	63	4,032	3	192	3	192	66	4,224
Uttar Pradesh	403	208	397	82,576	386	80,288	2	416	9	1,872	388	80,704
West Bengal	294	151	292	44,092	90	13,590	197	29,747	5	755	287	43,337
Delhi	70	58	70	4,060	65	3,770	2	116	3	174	67	3,886
Pondicherry	147	127	145	18,415	147	448	0	0	2	32	28	448
TOTALS	4,896		4,785	1,075,819	4,152	922,884	459	107,366	174	45,569	4,611	1,030,250
Source: Election Commission of India

== See also ==
- 2002 Indian vice presidential election
