= N. Varadarajan =

Indian politician

N.Varadarajan
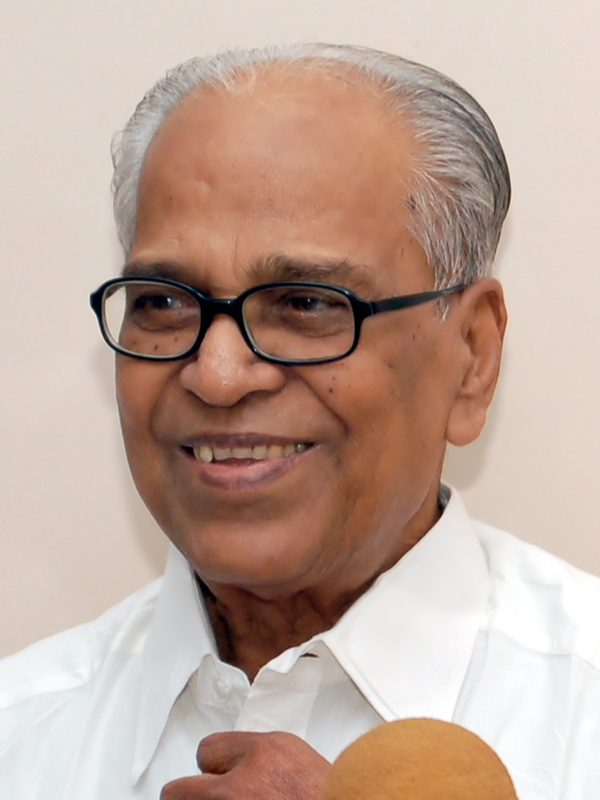

Member of the Tamil Nadu Legislative Assembly
- In office 1977–1984
- Preceded by: O. N. Sundaram Pillai
- Succeeded by: A. Premkumar
- Constituency: Dindigul
- In office 1967–1971
- Preceded by: S. Nanjunda Rao
- Succeeded by: P. Muthusamy
- Constituency: Vedasandur

Secretary, Communist Party of India (Marxist) — Tamil Nadu State Committee
- In office 14 February 2002 – 12 February 2010
- Preceded by: N. Sankaraiah
- Succeeded by: G. Ramakrishnan

Personal details
- Born: 1924 Dindigul, Madras Presidency, British India
- Died: 10 April 2012 (aged 87–88) Chennai, Tamilnadu, India
- Cause of death: Diabetes
- Party: Communist Party of India (Marxist)
- Children: Two sons

N. Varadarajan (1924 – 10 April 2012) was an Indian politician and former Member of the Legislative Assembly of Tamil Nadu. He was elected to the Tamil Nadu legislative assembly as a Communist Party of India (Marxist) candidate from Dindigul constituency in 1977 election, and as an Independent candidate in 1980 election.

== Politics ==
He started his career as a mill worker, he was dismissed by the management for organizing a union. He worked among tannery workers, cigar-makers and sanitary workers.

He joined the Communist Party in 1943. He was doing party work from underground for a year when the party was banned in 1949. He was elected to the Tamil Nadu Assembly from the Vedasandur constituency in 1967. Subsequently he represented Dindigul in 1977 and 1980. He was the party's whip in the Assembly.

After functioning as the party's Madurai district secretary and member of the State and State Secretariat committees, he was elected to the Central Committee in 1995. He was elected party secretary in Tamil Nadu in 2005 and again in 2008.

== Death ==
"He returned to Chennai on Tuesday morning after attending the party congress in Kozhikode. He walked up the stairs to reach his room in the party office, before feeling giddy. He was a diabetic, suffering from fluctuation in sugar level, said CPI(M) state secretary G. Ramakrishnan.
