= K. Balabharathi =

Indian politician

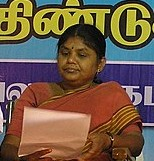

Member of Tamil Nadu legislative assembly
- In office 14 May 2001 – 20 May 2016
- Preceded by: R. Manimaran
- Succeeded by: Dindigul C. Srinivasan
- Constituency: Dindigul

Personal details
- Born: K. Nagalakshimi; 30 March 1963 (age 63) Kathiranampatti, Dindigul district, Madras State, India
- Party: Communist Party of India (Marxist)

K. Balabharathi is an Indian politician and a former member of the Tamil Nadu Legislative Assembly elected thrice from the Dindigul constituency. She represented the Communist Party of India (Marxist) party in the, 12th, 13th and 14th Legislative Assembly of Tamil Nadu.

After she announced retirement from elections, the elections of 2016 resulted in her constituency being won by ADMK candidate Dindigul C.Sreenivasan against DMK candidate Basheer Ahmed.
