= K. Hemalata =

Indian woman politician

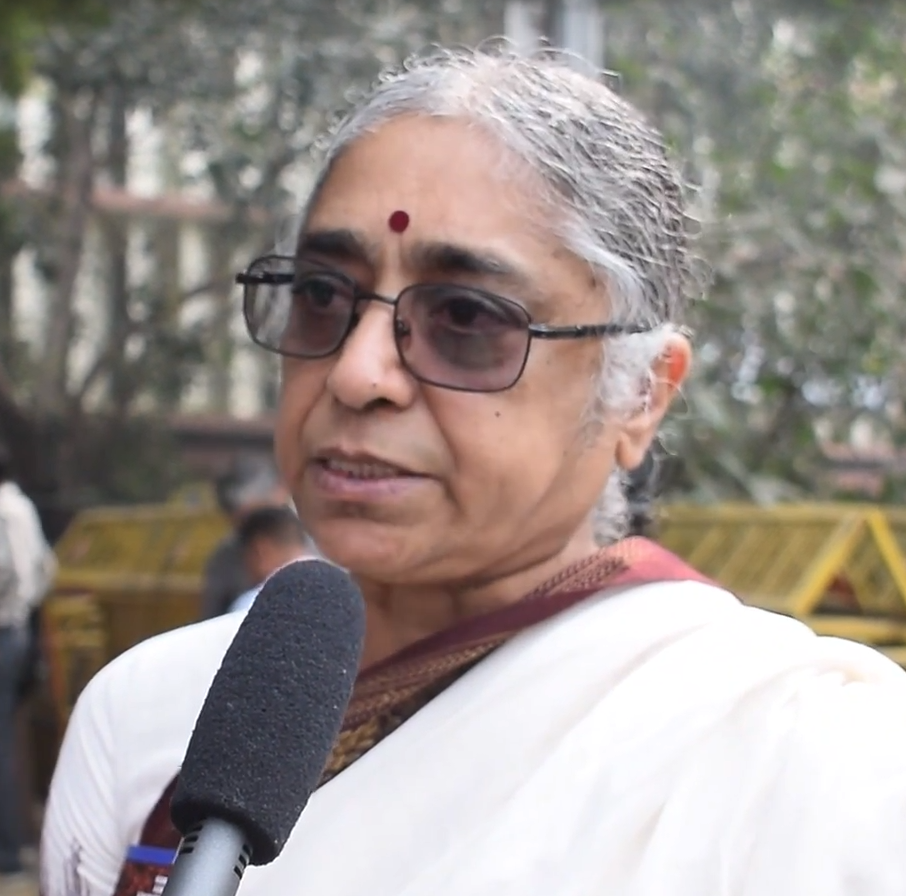

Central Committee of the Communist Party of India (Marxist)

Personal details
- Born: Nellore, Andhra Pradesh, India
- Party: Communist Party of India (Marxist)
- Occupation: Trade unionist

K. Hemalata is an Indian Marxist politician and Central Committee member of Communist Party of India (Marxist). She is the first woman to lead a union at national level in the history of trade union movement in India.

== Biography ==
Kandikuppa Hemalatha was born in 1951 in Andhra Pradesh, the eldest of six children of Vaikunda Rao and Shankari. She studied in MKCG Medical College and Hospital at Berhampur in Odisha. In 1973, Hemalata joined as a doctor in the 'People's Clinic' of Puchalapalli Sundarayya at Nellore. Since then she was active in Marxist politics as well as started medical practice in Machilipatnam. She became a municipal councilor in 1987 and in 1995 she quit the medical profession, joined in trade union movement as a full timer. Hemalata became the State secretary of CITU in Andhra Pradesh. She was also appointed in the post of general secretary of All India Federation of Anganwadi Workers and Helpers for the period from 1998 to 2012. In November 2016 Hemalata was elected as the president of the Centre of Indian Trade Unions (CITU) in its 15th National conference held in Puri. In the 20th party Congress of CPI(M), she became the member of newly elected Central Committee and got elected to the Central Committee in the next four Congresses too.
