= Srilatha Swaminathan =

Indian politician and activist (1944–2017)

- Born: 29 April 1944; Madras, British India
- Died: 5 February 2017 (aged 72); Udaipur, Rajasthan, India
- Education: National Institute of Design
- Years active: 1970s–2010s
- Political party: Communist Party of India (Marxist–Leninist) Liberation
- Spouse: Mahendra Singh Choudhary (m. 1976)
- Father: Govind Swaminadhan
- Family: Swaminathan family

Srilatha Swaminathan (29 April 1944 – 5 February 2017) was an Indian politician and activist. She was a leader of the Communist Party of India (Marxist–Leninist) Liberation (CPI(ML)L) and the president of the All India Progressive Women's Association (AIPWA).

== Early and personal life ==
Srilatha Swaminathan was born in Madras on 29 April 29 1944 to the Supreme Court of India lawyer Govind Swaminadhan and is part of the Swaminathan family. Her family was close to both Jawaharlal Nehru and Indira Gandhi. After her graduation in Madras, she completed a degree from the National School of Drama and then pursued a one-year diploma in drama in London. She met Mahendra Singh Choudhary at a meeting in Delhi in 1973 and they got married in 1976 while in hiding.

== Political career ==
Swaminathan joined the CPI(ML)L in 1972. She organised the farmers and farm workers of Mehrauli and hotel workers in Delhi. During the Emergency of 1975, Swaminathan was arrested and imprisoned at Tihar jail for 10 months, after which she was moved to a jail in Chennai. While in Chennai, she organised the port workers into a union. She was briefly imprisoned with Maharani Gayatri Devi during the Emergency.

In 1977, she and Chaudhary moved to Rajasthan. There, she worked with Seva Mandir for about a year. Its founder, Mohan Singh Mehta, knew her mother. They then moved to Ghantali, a small village which was then in Banswara district. While there, she fought for the rights of tribals, particularly their forcible displacement due to the construction of the Mahi Bajaj Sagar Dam and the Sardar Sarovar Dam. She also organized bonded labour, slum dwellers and hotel workers.

Swaminathan also organised farmers under the Rajasthan Kisan Sanghathan and became its president for a few years. Under her leadership, the peasants revolted in Hadmatiya. The Supreme Court appointed her as a Commissioner on two occasions, first for the bonded labour in Rajasthan and then for the people who lost their land due to the Sardar Sarovar Dam.

In the 1990, Swaminathan was elected president of the AIPWA. In 1992, she was part of the protests against the gangrape of Bhanwari Devi. She helped in forming the People's Union for Civil Liberties (PUCL) in Jaipur in 1996.

She was then chosen as a member of CPI(ML)L Central Committee in 1997. She continued to be an active member of the committee till the Ranchi CPI(ML)L party congress in April 2013, when she was relieved of her duties due to health reasons. She was also elected as the vice-president of the All India Central Council of Trade Unions.

== Illness and death ==
Swaminathan was confined to a bed since 2011. She treated herself with alternate therapy like tribal herbal medicines and Morarji Desai's urine therapy.

She suffered a stroke on the night of 28 January 2017. She was then admitted to the intensive care unit of Chaudhary Hospital in Hiran Magri area of Udaipur district and died of a cardiac arrest on 5 February in Udaipur. Her remains were cremated at Ashok Nagar crematorium in Udaipur on 6 February.
