= M. R. Venkataraman =

Indian Politician (1907–1985)

Member of Parliament, Rajya Sabha
- In office 3 April 1968 – 2 April 1974
- Constituency: Tamil Nadu

State Secretary of the Communist Party of India (Marxist), Tamil Nadu
- In office 1964–1972
- Preceded by: Position established
- Succeeded by: A. Balasubramaniam

Personal details
- Born: 20 August 1907 Coimbatore, Madras Presidency, British India
- Died: 23 May 1985 (aged 77) Madras, Tamil Nadu, India
- Party: Communist Party of India (Marxist) (1964–1985); Communist Party of India (1939–1964)
- Occupation: Lawyer; Politician

M. Ramaswamy Sivam Venkataraman (20 August 1907 – 23 May 1985), was an Indian politician, communist leader, and pioneer of the communist movement in Tamil Nadu. He was a founding member of the Communist Party of India (Marxist) and served as the first State Secretary of the Communist Party of India (Marxist), Tamil Nadu. He also went in the Rajya Sabha from 1968 to 1974.

== Early life ==
M. R. Venkataraman was born on August 20, 1907, into a family of well-known social reformers in Coimbatore, Madras Presidency, British India. His father, Ramaswamy Sivam, was the principal of the Tamil Nadu Agricultural University, Coimbatore and a renowned agronomist. MRV received his early schooling at Coimbatore and attended college in Madras. After earning his law degree, he began practising in the Madras High Court under the nationalist barrister and disciple of Sri Aurobindo, S. Doraiswamy Iyer, where he handled cases involving workers jailed during widespread strikes in 1935-40. He first met the communist leaders of Tamil Nadu and Andhra Pradesh in the early 1930s, when he was already an activist of the Indian National Congress.

== Communist Movement before 1947 ==
M. R. Venkataraman was rapidly fascinated with Marxism, Communism, and the ideological ideals of the Communist Party of India and eventually joined the party in 1939. At the outbreak of the World War II, MRV was arrested under the Defence of India Act. While he was under detention, his wife fell ill, and he was released on parole to see her. At the directives of the Party, which was then illegal, he jumped parole and went underground. He worked underground for about one and a half years before he was arrested and detained. During this period his wife died, leaving behind his only daughter, Bharathi. After being released from prison for his immense organisational power, he was elected as the State Secretary of the Communist Party of India, Tamil Nadu, in 1942.

== Communist Movement after 1947 ==
After India gained independence in 1947, M. R. Venkataraman was again arrested and detained when the party was attacked in 1948-51, and he, along with co-prisoners like A. K. Gopalan, narrowly escaped being killed when the police opened fire on the prisoners in the Cuddalore Central Prison. He was repeatedly imprisoned and had to remain underground; the duration of his total jail life was 11 years, and underground life three years.

M. R. Venkataraman served as the State Secretary of the Communist Party of India, Tamil Nadu, until 1948, then he was again reappointed from 1952 to 1962, by which time the Party had become increasingly divided. Since being elected Secretary of the Tamil Nadu State Committee of the then-United CPI, he has devoted his entire time and energy to the critical task of educating and organising party cadres in Tamil Nadu. He also assisted the adjacent state committees and the party's central committee in the job of organising the party. During some of his period, he was also editor of the Tamil theoretical journal "Jana Sakthi".

As a Marxist-Leninist by conviction, MRV was irreconcilable in the struggle against both right and left deviation. During the 1964 split in the Communist Party of India, he stood firm against revisionism, which challenged Marxism-Leninism, and joined other comrades in the struggle for Marxism-Leninism who walked out of the National Council, becoming a founding member of the Communist Party of India (Marxist).

M. R. Venkataraman was elected to the Central Committee of the Communist Party of India (Marxist) and State Secretary of the Communist Party of India (Marxist), Tamil Nadu, at the 7th Party Congress held in Calcutta. He was reelected to the Central Committee in every successive congress until 1982 and served as the State Secretary of the Communist Party of India (Marxist), Tamil Nadu, until his health deteriorated in 1972. For the next seven years, he was the party's Central Control Commission convenor. He also served as a Rajya Sabha Member for six years, from 1968 to 1974.

== Death ==
M. R. Venkataraman, suffering from a prolonged illness for years, died on May 23, 1985, in Madras, Tamil Nadu, India.
