= Maya Thevar =

Indian politician (1934–2022)

Maya Thevar MP

Member of Parliament, Lok Sabha
- In office 21 May 1973 – 31 December 1984
- Preceded by: M. Rajangam
- Succeeded by: K. R. Natarajan
- Constituency: Dindigul

Personal details
- Born: Karuppu Maya Thevar; 15 October 1934 T. Uchapatti, Usilampatti, Madurai district, Madras Presidency, British India
- Died: 9 August 2022 (aged 87) Chinnalapatti, Dindigul district, Tamil Nadu, India
- Party: AIADMK
- Education: Pachaiyappa's College
- Occupation: Politician
- Nickname(s): Maayan, Maya

Karuppu Maya Thevar (15 October 1934 – 9 August 2022) was an Indian politician who served as Member of Parliament from 1973 to 1984, elected from Dindigul, Tamil Nadu. He was the first AIADMK candidate since its inception to be elected to the Lok Sabha, from Dindigul in the 1973 by-election. Subsequently, in late 1979, he quit from AIADMK, and joined the Dravida Munnetra Kazhagam (DMK) party. Maya Thevar was given a ticket to contest Dindigul Lok Sabha election as a DMK nominee in January 1980, and was successful in being elected, against the AIADMK candidate. However, in the Dec 1984 Lok Sabha election, again contesting as the sitting DMK MP, Maya Thevar was defeated.

Maya Thevar was credited with selecting the two leaves symbol for the AIADMK in 1973.

He is survived by his wife and two children.
