= N. Sankaraiah =

Indian politician and independence activist (1921–2023)

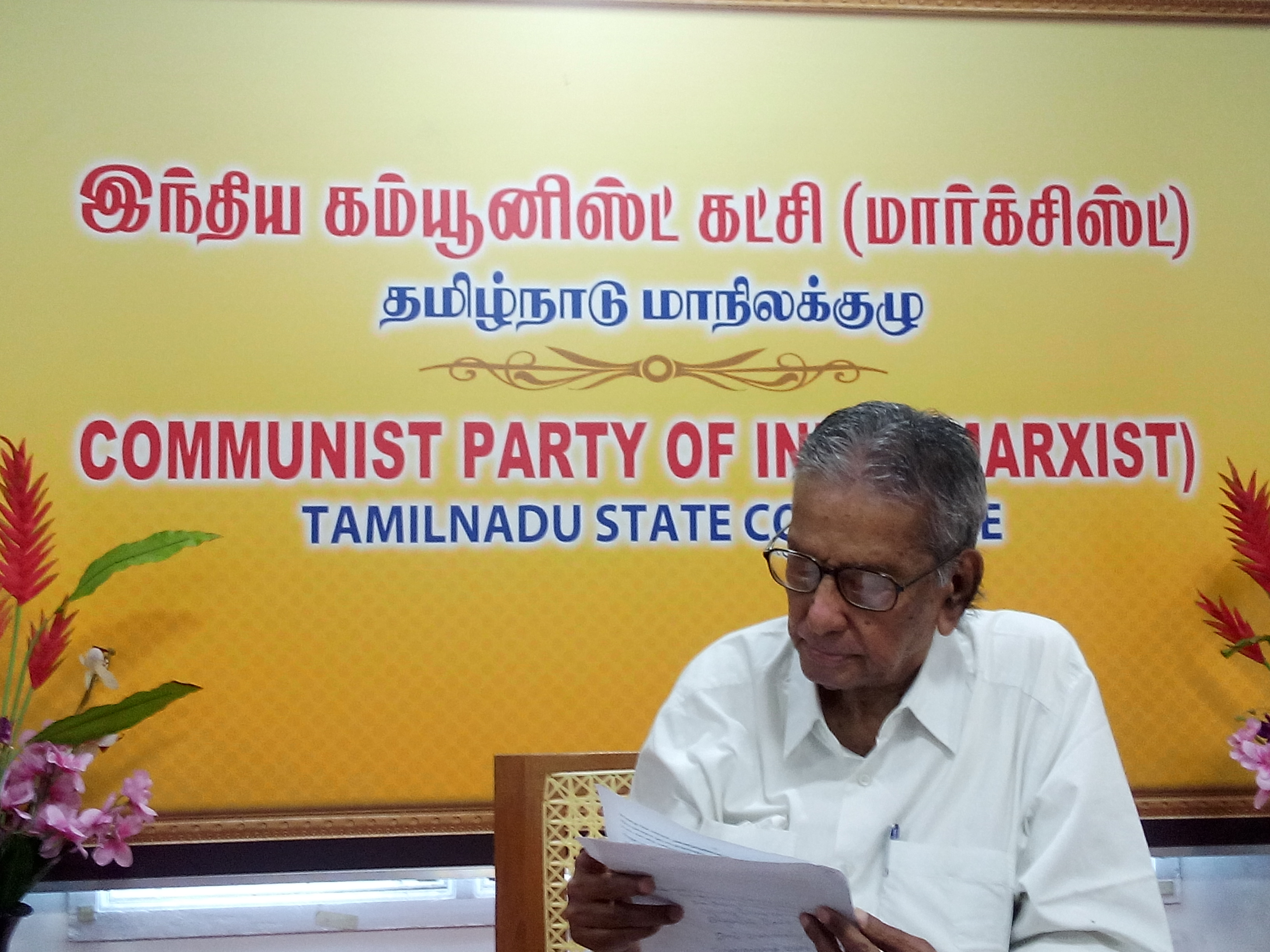

Member of Tamil Nadu Legislative Assembly
- In office 1967–1971
- Constituency: Madurai West
- In office 1977–1984
- Constituency: Madurai East

Secretary of Communist Party of India (Marxist) — Tamil Nadu State Committee
- In office 1995–2002
- Preceded by: A. Nallasivan
- Succeeded by: N. Varadarajan

Personal details
- Born: 15 July 1921 Kovilpatti, Madras Presidency, British India (now in Tamil Nadu, India)
- Died: 15 November 2023 (aged 102) Chennai, Tamil Nadu, India
- Party: Communist Party of India (Marxist) (1964–2023)
- Other political affiliations: Communist Party of India (1947–1964)
- Relations: R. Selvaraj (fraternal nephew)
- Occupation: Politician

N. Sankaraiah (15 July 1921 – 15 November 2023) was an Indian Communist Party politician and independence activist.

== Early years ==
After matriculation, Sankaraiah studied history from the American College, Madurai beginning in 1937. He was one of the founders of the Madras Students organization and was elected secretary of the Madurai Students Union. During this time he started participating in the freedom struggle of India. He was first arrested in 1941 in his final year of studies.

== Politics ==
His political career spanned over seven decades, and included nearly eight years in jail. Sankaraiah, who was one among the many communists who were released the day before India attained independence in August 1947, campaigned for communist candidates in the first general elections.

He was one of the 32 National Council members who walked out of a Communist Party of India National Council meeting held on 11 April 1964, in protest, accusing party chairman S.A. Dange and his followers of "anti-unity and anti-Communist policies".

Later he became one of the founding members of the Communist Party of India (Marxist). He was the central committee member of the Communist Party of India (Marxist). He was part of the leadership of the All India Kisan Sabha. He was the CPI(M) Tamil Nadu state secretary from 1995 to 2002.

Sankaraiah was elected to the Tamil Nadu legislative assembly twice from the Madurai West constituency in 1967 and from the Madurai East constituency in 1977 and 1980. He unsuccessfully contested the 1962 and 1957 elections from the Madurai East constituency.

== Personal life and death ==
Sankaraiah was married to Navamani. His two sons, Chandrasekar and Narasimman, are party leaders. He turned 100 in July 2021.

Sankaraiah died at Apollo Hospitals in Chennai on 15 November 2023, at the age of 102. He was being treated for fever and breathing problems.

His elder brother's son R. Selvaraj is a screenwriter in Tamil Nadu's film industry.
