= G. Ramakrishnan =

Indian politician

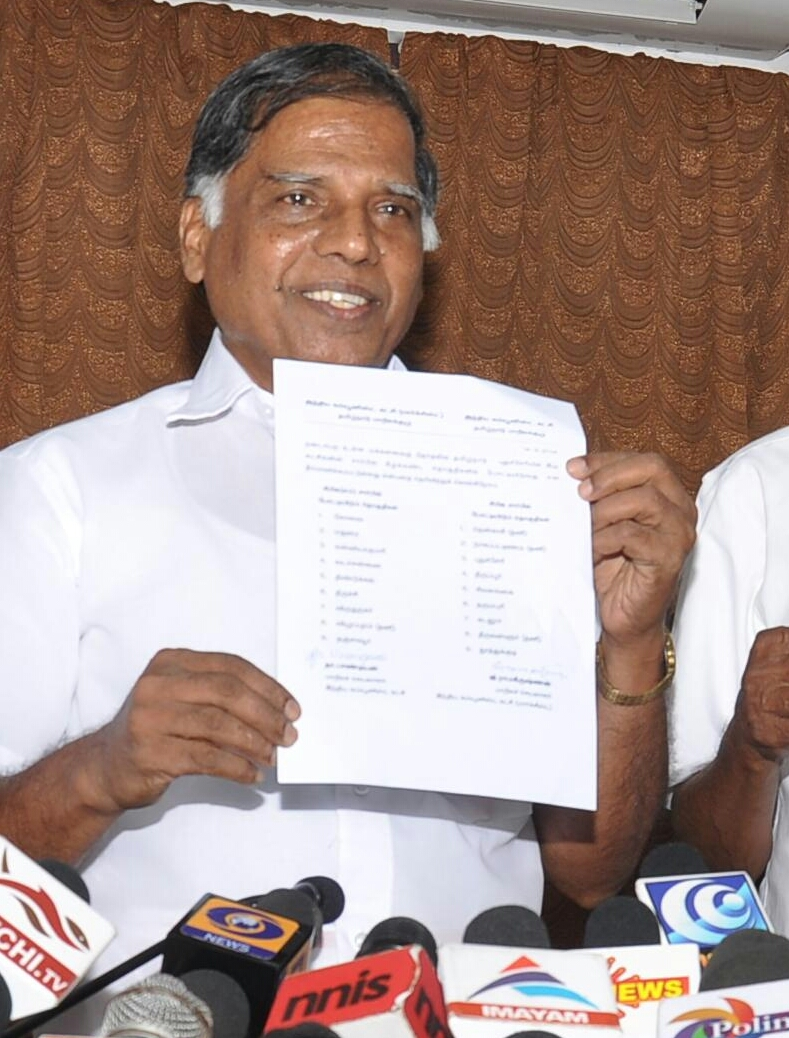

Member of the CPI(M) Politburo
- Incumbent
- Assumed office 12 February 2010

Secretary, Communist Party of India (Marxist) — Tamil Nadu State Committee
- In office 12 February 2010 – 19 February 2018
- Preceded by: N. Varadarajan
- Succeeded by: K. Balakrishnan

Personal details
- Born: 6 June 1949 (age 77) Memalur, Vilupuram District
- Party: Communist Party of India (Marxist)
- Spouse: Reeda
- Children: Vanchinathan & Suhasini

G. Ramakrishnan is an Indian politician from Tamil Nadu. He is a Politburo member, Central Committee Member and the ex-state secretary of Tamil Nadu State Committee of Communist Party of India (Marxist).

== Early life and education ==
His native of Villupuram district, is a member of the CPI(M) central committee and Tamil Nadu State Secretariat.

He is a lawyer by training, he joined the party in 1969, actively working for the Students Federation of India (SFI). He practiced for eight years as a lawyer in Cuddalore before becoming a full-time party member in 1981. He has been active in its various organizations including the DYFI and CITU.

At the Coimbatore All India Conference, he was elected to the State Secretariat in 1989 and the Central Committee in 2008.
