= R. Manimaran (Dindigul MLA) =

Indian politician

R. Manimaran was elected to the Tamil Nadu Legislative Assembly from the Dindigul constituency in the 1996 elections. He was a candidate of the Dravida Munnetra Kazhagam (DMK) party.

The DMK denied him the opportunity to contest the 2001 elections and later suspended him for alleged anti-party activities.
