= M. Udhayakumar =

Indian politician

Member of the India Parliament for Dindigul
- In office 1 September 2014 – 23 May 2019
- Constituency: Dindigul

Personal details
- Born: 25 May 1968 (age 58) Jallipatti, Dindigul, Tamil Nadu
- Party: All India Anna Dravida Munnetra Kazhagam
- Spouse: Smt. Vimalarani U
- Children: 2
- Education: Tamil Nadu Open University, Government Law College, Madurai
- Occupation: Advocate
- As of 17 December, 2016

M Udhayakumar (born 1969) is an Indian politician, a Lawyer and Member of Parliament elected from Tamil Nadu. He is elected to the Lok Sabha from Dindigul constituency as an Anna Dravida Munnetra Kazhagam candidate in 2014 election. He is interested in the public service.

In 2014, he was elected to the 16th Lok Sabha with the massive vote counts of 5,12,000 by defeating Gandhirajan S of DMK party in Dindigul constituency.

In 2014, he was a Member of Standing Committee on Personnel, Public Grievances, Law and Justice

In 2014, he was a Member of Consultative Committee, Ministry of Youth Affairs and Sports

In 2006, Udhayakumar was the Vice Chairman of Town Panchayat, Nilakottai.
