= Uzhaippali Makkal Katchi =

Uzhaippali Makkal Katchi is a political party in Indian state of Tamil Nadu.
