= R. Sachithanantham =

Indian politician

Member of Parliament, Lok Sabha
- Incumbent
- Assumed office 4 June 2024
- Preceded by: P. Velusamy
- Constituency: Dindigul

Personal details
- Citizenship: Indian
- Party: Communist Party of India (Marxist)
- Parent: Rathinavel (father)
- Education: Bachelor of Science (B.Sc)
- Alma mater: GTN Arts & Science College
- Occupation: Politician, social activist, farmer

Rathnavel Sachithanantham is an Indian politician from Tamil Nadu. In 2024, he was elected to the Lok Sabha, the lower house of the Parliament of India from Dindigul Lok Sabha constituency on behalf of the Communist Party of India (Marxist).
