= Peruvallanallur =

Village in Tamil Nadu, India

Coordinates: 10°55′26.36″N 78°50′30.86″E

Peruvalanallur is a small village in the district of Trichy in the Indian state of Tamil Nadu. It is located in Lalgudi taluk. The nearest large village is Poovalur. Both side have two lakes, northside of village have two river passing, south part have rice or sugarcane cultivation.

== Economy ==
The major occupation in the village is agriculture, mainly sugarcane and rice. The land is fertile throughout the year.

== History ==
The village may have originated in the 15th or 17th century, although the exact date is unknown. But historical documents attest to a place called 'Peruvalanallur' being the site of a major battle between the feuding Chalukya emperors and the Pallavas under emperor Parameswaravarman I in the 7th century. The Chalukyas were encamped in Vellanur village. The armies clashed in Peruvalanallur, along the Pullambadi Canal. The fighting lasted 14 to 18 days and is one of the longest wars in Tamil Nadu history, with many soldiers killed on both sides. Finally, the Pallava secured the victory and recovered their autonomy.

Some stone culvert remnants date from this period, located in a cremation ground along Vellanur road near Teppakulam and the Trichy-Ariyalur main road in Peruvala Nallur. A sword that may be a remnant of the war has been discovered by a pallar community village farmer in his field.

== Emigration ==
In the last 8–10 years, residents have been moving out of the village to Trichy, a large city with better job opportunities in non-agricultural industries. Because of this, the village's population is quite low, and agricultural production has fallen.

The 2011 census tabulated a population of 1700 persons in West Peruvalanallur and 3,870 persons in East Peruvalanallur totalling 5,570 persons. The 1981 census counted 5,094 persons in Peruvalanallur.
