= Tammineni Veerabhadram =

Indian politician

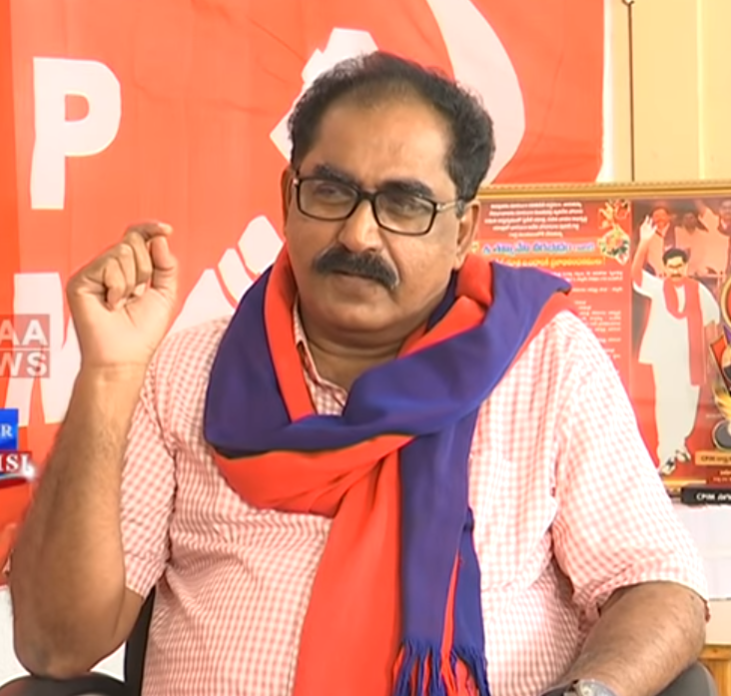
- Veerabhadram in a television interview

Telangana State Secretary, CPI (M)
- In office 8 March 2014 – 28 January 2025
- Succeeded by: John Wesley

Member of Parliament, Lok Sabha
- In office 9 May 1996 – 5 March 1998
- Constituency: Khammam

Member of Legislative Assembly, United Andhra Pradesh
- In office 11 May 2004 – 16 May 2009
- Chief Minister: Y. S. Rajasekhar Reddy
- Constituency: Khammam

Personal details
- Born: 1954 (age 71–72)
- Party: Communist Party of India (Marxist)
- Spouse: Uma
- Children: Sangamithra (son), Dr. Sruthi (daughter)

Tammineni Veerabhadram (born 1954) is an Indian politician, belonging to the Communist Party of India (Marxist). As of December 2022, he is a Central Committee member of the party.

== Early and personal life ==
Veerabhadram hails from Khammam District. His wife's name is Uma, son's name is Sangamithra and daughter's name Dr. Sruthi. He entered politics through activism in the Students Federation of India.

== Career ==
Veerabhadram contested the Khammam Lok Sabha seat in the 1991 Indian general election. He finished in second place with 310,268 votes (43.37% of the votes in the constituency). There was less than 1% margin between him and the winning candidate, P.V. Rangaiah Naidu of the Indian National Congress. He contested the Khammam seat again in the 1996 election and got elected to the 11th Lok Sabha. He obtained 374,675 votes (42.82%), defeating P.V. Rangaiah Naidu.

He lost the Khammam Lok Sabha seat in the 1998 election. Veerabhadram won 352,083 votes (39.01%), finishing in second place. He was the most voted CPI(M) candidate in the fray outside of the left strongholds West Bengal and Kerala.

Veerabhadram was elected to the Andhra Pradesh Legislative Assembly in the 2004 election, standing as a candidate in the Khammam constituency. He obtained 46,505 votes. In the 2009 Legislative Assembly election, he contested the neighbouring Palair constituency instead, where he finished in second place with 58,889 votes (37.98%). As of 2011, he served as honorary president of the Khammam District unit of the Kulavivaksha Vyatireka Porata Sangham.

When the CPI(M) decided to create a separate State Committee for Telangana in March 2014, following the passing of the Andhra Pradesh State Reorganisation Bill, Veerabhadram was elected as its Secretary.
