= M. Gulam Mohideen Rowther =

Indian politician (1918–1992)

M. Gulam Mohideen (July 1918 – 29 July 1992) was an Indian politician of the Indian National Congress who served as a member of the Lok Sabha from Dindigal in 1957.

== Biography ==
M. Gulam Mohideen was born in Uthamapalayam in July 1918. He was son of S. Mohammed Meera Rowther also known as Landlord Haji karutha Rowther. He was educated at Board High School in Uthamapalayam, and the American College, Madurai. Landlord, he was the secretary of the Madurai Students’ Organisation and Co-operative Stores. Mohideen was also a member of the Theni Co-operative Society. His activism went underground at end of 1941 and he took an active part in the 1942 movement. As a student leader, he conducted many struggles during the war period.

Mohideen was president of district, town and provincial Congress Committees. His interests included Kisan and development works. He was later the President of the Panchayat Board in Uthamapalayam, and an honorary jail visitor at the Uthamapalayam Sub-Jail.

Mohideen died in Uthamapalayam on 29 July 1992, at the age of 74.

== Memberships ==
- Former Secretary, Madurai Student Federation,
- Former Secretary, Co-operative Society Uthamapalaiyam,
- Former Member, Theni Co-operative Society, Theni,
- key player in the Quit India Movement
- During the war in 1942, he led many struggles as a student leader.
- Former President of the city, District and Provincial Congress of the Indian National Congress;
- Interested in agriculture and welfare,
- Former Chairman of Uththamapalaiyam City Panchayat,
- Honorary Visitor and Welfare Officer of Uthamapalaiyam Branch Prison.
