= Vachathi case =

1992 atrocity by police against the villagers of Vachathi, Tamil Nadu, India

- Location: 11°58′2″N 78°28′16″E; Vachathi, Dharmapuri district, Tamil Nadu
- Date: 20 June 1992
- Attack type: Assault, Mass rape, Property damage, Collective punishment, Killing of livestock, Caste/tribal-targeted violence
- Victims: Assaulted around 100 villagers, and raped 18 women
- Perpetrators: Tamil Nadu Police; Tamil Nadu Forest Department; Department of Revenue (Tamil Nadu)
- Accused: 269
- Verdict: 215 officials were sentenced to prison
- Convicted: 215

The Vachathi case involved a mass crime that occurred on 20 June 1992 in the village of Vachathi, in Dharmapuri district, Tamil Nadu. A team of 155 forest personnel, 108 policemen and six revenue officials entered the Tribal-dominated Vachathi village, searching for smuggled sandalwood and to gather information about Veerappan. Under the pretext of conducting a search, the team ransacked the villagers' property, destroyed their houses, killed their cattle, assaulted around 100 villagers, and raped 18 women.

After a court order, the CBI began probing the case, which was also under the scope of the National Human Rights Commission. On 29 September 2011, a special court in India convicted all 269 accused officials under the SC-ST Prevention of Atrocities act and 17 of those for rape. Fifty-four of the original accused had died by the time of the convictions; the remaining 215 were sentenced to jail.

== Background ==
Vachathi is a village located in Dharmapuri district, 300 km (190 mi) away from the state capital Chennai. During June 1992, the villagers, who were mostly tribals, prevented forest and revenue officials from entering the hamlet. The officials complained that the villagers were involved in sandalwood smuggling and aiding Veerappan, a notorious forest brigand. During the evening, 269 officials, being 155 forest personnel, 108 policemen and six revenue officials, raided the village and herded the villagers under a tree. A hundred men from the village were brutally assaulted while 18 women were gangraped. The raid continued for two days when the hamlet was demolished.

== Trial ==
The trial was held at Dharmapuri Principal District Court. There were 269 accused in the case that had 155 forest personnel, 108 policemen, and six revenue officials. All the 269 who were accused were sentenced on 29 September 2011. Of the 269, 54 died during the trial. Of the remaining 215, 126 belonged to the forest department, 84 were policemen, and five were revenue officials. Out of the 17 rapists, 12 were sentenced to 17 years imprisonment and 5 were given 5 years of imprisonment. The rest of the accused were sentenced to one to two years in prison. The Central Bureau of Investigation, had probed the case, on the directions of the Madras High Court in 1995 and filed a charge sheet against as many as 269 accused who included the then Principal Chief Conservator of Forests (PCCF), M. Harikrishnan, Conservators of Forests, P. Muthaiyan and L. Nathan and District Forest Officer, S. Balaji for brutally gangraping the women in the village.

== Aftermath ==
Police were not ready to accept the case for three years. The villagers were denied compensation for a long time. On 12 September 2014, the state government offered a compensation of ₹12.2 lakh to all the victims. An additional ₹60,000 was allocated to each of the 105 villagers who were drafted in the chargesheet filed in 1999. The chargesheet was quashed by the court during November 2012.

== Media depictions ==
The entire incident has been made into a film by the name Vachathi, and in the background of the Veerappan nabbing operation, many atrocities and human rights violations were committed by special task force police. The Tamil novel Solagar Thotti, written by S. Balamurugan, exposed the same. The documentary Vachathi – The Long March For Struggle traces the prolonged struggle for justice after this incident by Comrade Talkies Team Production on March 3 2026.

Vetrimaaran's film Viduthalai Part 1 is also based on the same incident.

== See also ==
- Operation Cocoon
