= 1980 Indian general election in Tamil Nadu =

Indian general election in Tamil Nadu, 1980
- January 1980

39 (of 542) seats to the Lok Sabha
- Registered: 28,113,893
- Turnout: 66.76% ▼0.37%
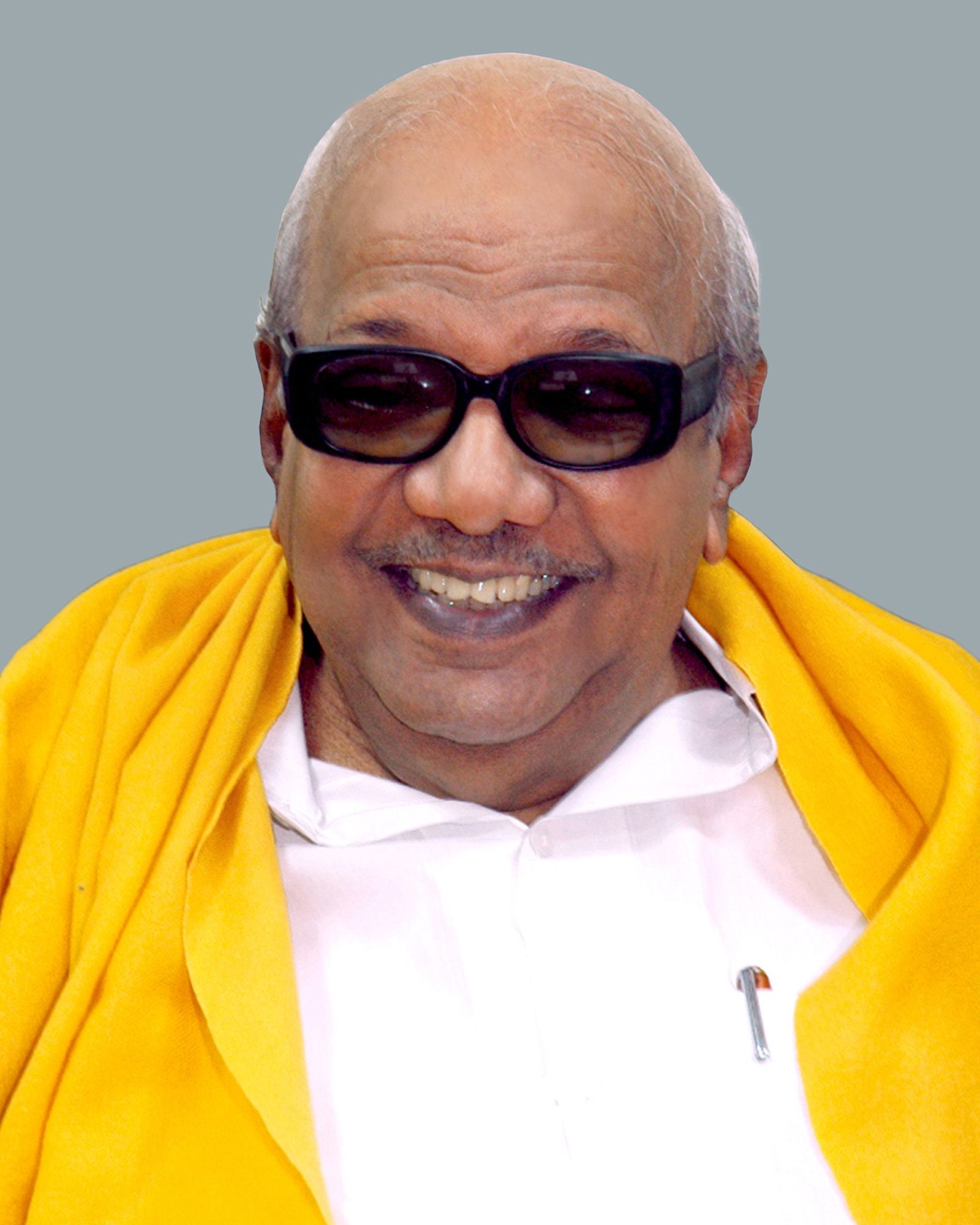

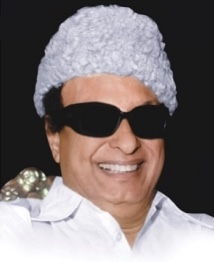
| | First party | Second party |
|---|---|---|
| Leader | M. Karunanidhi | M. G. Ramachandran |
| Party | DMK | AIADMK |
| Alliance | Congress Alliance | Janata alliance+LF |
| Leader's seat | Did not contest | Did not contest |
| Seats won | 37 | 2 |
| Seat change | ▲21 | ▼21 |
| Popular vote | 10,290,515 | 7,392,655 |
| Percentage | 55.89% | 40.14% |
| Swing | ▲15.01% | ▼13.73% |
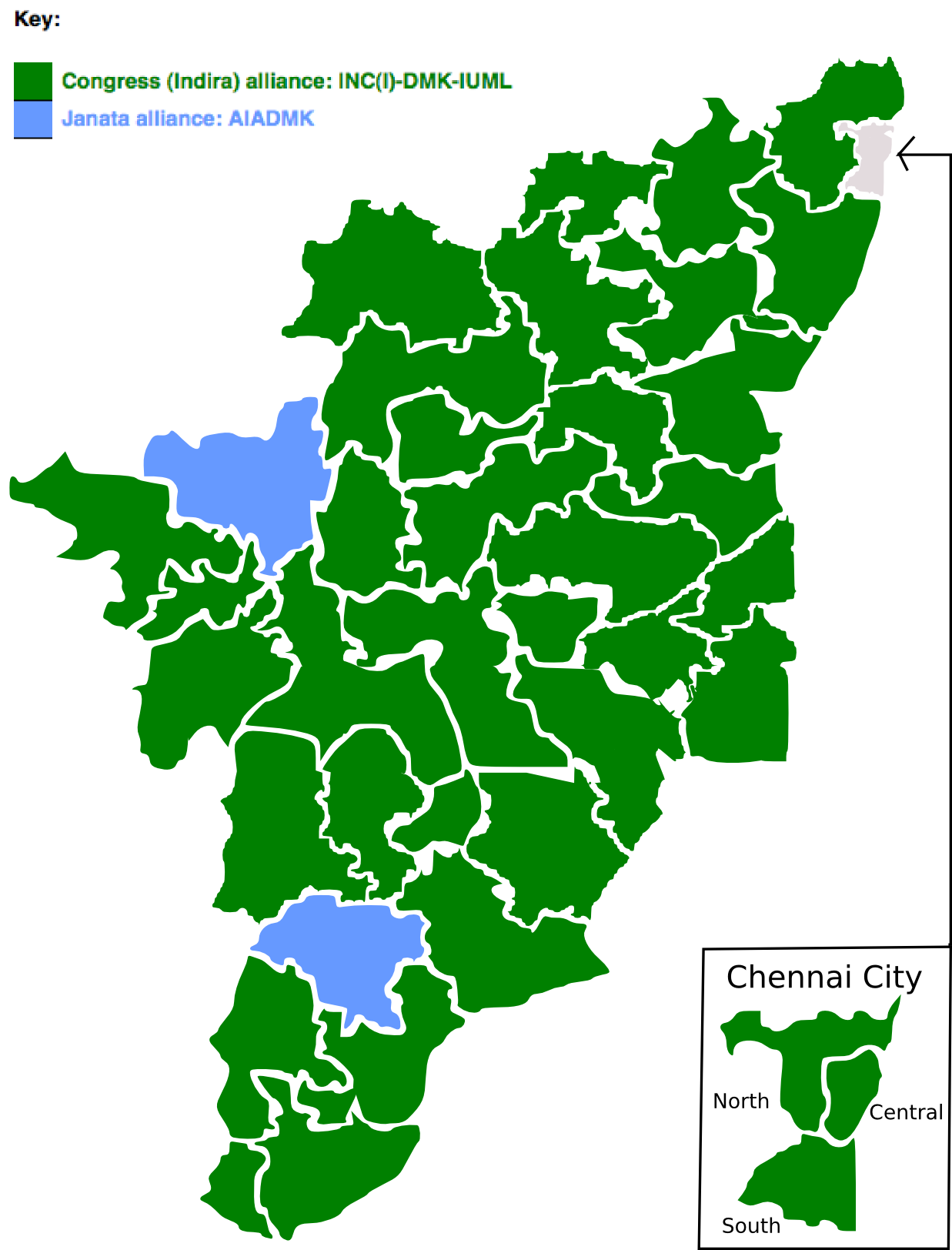
- 1980 Election map (by constituencies); Green = INC(I)+ and Blue = JP+

- Seat wise Result
Prime Minister before election
Charan Singh
JP(S)
Elected Prime Minister
Indira Gandhi
INC(I)

The 1980 Indian general election in Tamil Nadu saw elections for all 39 Lok Sabha seats in the state. The result was a landslide victory for the Indian National Congress (Indira) and its ally Dravida Munnetra Kazhagam, who won 37 out of 39 seats. Many observers considered it an upset defeat for the ruling state party, All India Anna Dravida Munnetra Kazhagam, and its general secretary M. G. Ramachandran, which only won 2 seats—Gobichettipalayam and Sivakasi. Prior to the election, INC leader Indira Gandhi had formed an alliance with the DMK, resulting in an important part of her victory in the nationwide election that returned her to the office of Prime Minister of India.

== Seat Allotment ==
=== Congress Front ===
DMK-led Alliance
| Party | Flag | Symbol | Leader | Seats |
| Indian National Congress | | | Indira Gandhi | 22 |
| Dravida Munnetra Kazhagam | | | M. Karunanidhi | 16 |
| Independent (Note: Scales Symbol was Independent Symbol throughout India, except Punjab in 1980 elections.) | | | A. K. A. Abdul Samad | 1 |
| Total | | | | 39 |

=== Janata Alliance ===
AIADMK-led Alliance
| Party | Flag | Symbol | Leader | Seats |
| All India Anna Dravida Munnetra Kazhagam | | | M. G. Ramachandran | 24 |
| Janata Party | | | P. Ramachandran | 9 |
| Communist Party of India (Marxist) | | | A. Balasubramaniam | 3 |
| Communist Party of India | | | P. Manickam | 3 |
| Total | | | | 39 |

== List of Candidates ==
| Constituency | | DMK+ | | AIADMK+ | |
| # | Name | Party | Candidate | Party | Candidate |
|---|---|---|---|---|---|
| 1 | Madras North | DMK | G. Lakshmanan | ADMK | M. S. Abdul Khader |
| 2 | Madras Central | DMK | A. Kalanithi | JP | P. Ramachandran |
| 3 | Madras South | INC(I) | R. Venkataraman | ADMK | E. V. K. F. Sulochana Sampath |
| 4 | Sriperumbudur (SC) | DMK | T. Nagaratnam | ADMK | S. M. Jaganathan |
| 5 | Chengalpattu | INC(I) | Era. Anbarasu | ADMK | R. M. Mohanarangam |
| 6 | Arakkonam | INC(I) | A. M. Velu | ADMK | A. M. Ragunathan |
| 7 | Vellore | IND | A. K. A. Abdul Samad | JP | V. Dhandayuthapani |
| 8 | Tiruppattur | DMK | S. Murugaiyan | ADMK | M. M. Pandurangan |
| 9 | Vandavasi | INC(I) | D. Pattuswamy | ADMK | C. A. M. Venugopal Gounder |
| 10 | Tindivanam | INC(I) | S. S. Ramasami | ADMK | Thirukkuralar Munusamy |
| 11 | Cuddalore | INC(I) | R. Muthukumar | ADMK | Aravinda Bala Pajanor |
| 12 | Chidambaram (SC) | DMK | V. Kulandaivelu | CPI(M) | S. Mahalingam |
| 13 | Dharmapuri | DMK | K. Arjunan | JP | G. Bhuvarahan |
| 14 | Krishnagiri | INC(I) | K. Ramamurthy | ADMK | V. M. Rajahagopal |
| 15 | Rasipuram (SC) | INC(I) | B. Devarajan | ADMK | S. Anbalagan |
| 16 | Salem | DMK | C. Palaniappan | ADMK | P. Kamnan |
| 17 | Tiruchengode | DMK | M. Kandaswamy | ADMK | R. Kolanthaivelu |
| 18 | Nilgiris | INC(I) | R. Prabhu | JP | T. T. S. Thippiah |
| 19 | Gobichettipalayam | INC(I) | N. R. Thiruvankadam | ADMK | G. Chinnasamy |
| 20 | Coimbatore | DMK | R. Ram Mohan | CPI | Parvathi Krishnan |
| 21 | Pollachi (SC) | DMK | C. T. Dhandapani | ADMK | M. A. M. Natarajan |
| 22 | Palani | INC(I) | A. Senapathi Gounder | JP | P. S. K. Lakshmipathy |
| 23 | Dindigul | DMK | Maya Thevar | ADMK | V. M. Rajan Chellappa |
| 24 | Madurai | INC(I) | A. G. Subburaman | CPI(M) | A. M. Balasubramanyam |
| 25 | Periyakulam | DMK | Cumbum Natarajan | ADMK | S. M. Ramasamy |
| 26 | Karur | INC(I) | S. A. Dorai Sebastian | ADMK | K. M. Kanagaraj |
| 27 | Tiruchirappalli | DMK | N. Selvaraj | CPI(M) | T. K. Rangarajan |
| 28 | Perambalur (SC) | INC(I) | K. B. S. Mani | ADMK | S. M. Thangaraju |
| 29 | Mayiladuthurai | INC(I) | Kudanthai N. Ramalingam | JP | S. M. Govindasamy |
| 30 | Nagapattinam (SC) | DMK | Thazhai Karunanithi | CPI | K. Murugaiyan |
| 31 | Thanjavur | INC(I) | S. Singaravadivel | ADMK | K. M. Thangamuthu |
| 32 | Pudukottai | INC(I) | V. N. Swamynathan | ADMK | M. Kuzha Chellaiya |
| 33 | Sivaganga | INC(I) | R. V. Swaminathan | CPI | D. Pandian |
| 34 | Ramanathapuram | DMK | M. S. K. Sathyendran | ADMK | P. M. Anbalagan |
| 35 | Sivakasi | INC(I) | V. Jayalakshmi | ADMK | N. Soundararajan |
| 36 | Tirunelveli | DMK | D. S. A. Sivaprakasam | ADMK | V. M. Arunachalam |
| 37 | Tenkasi (SC) | INC(I) | M. Arunachalam | JP | S. Rajagopalan |
| 38 | Tiruchendur | INC(I) | K. T. Kosalram | JP | N. Soundarapandian |
| 39 | Nagercoil | INC(I) | N. Dennis | JP | Pon. Vijayaraghavan |

== Voting and results ==
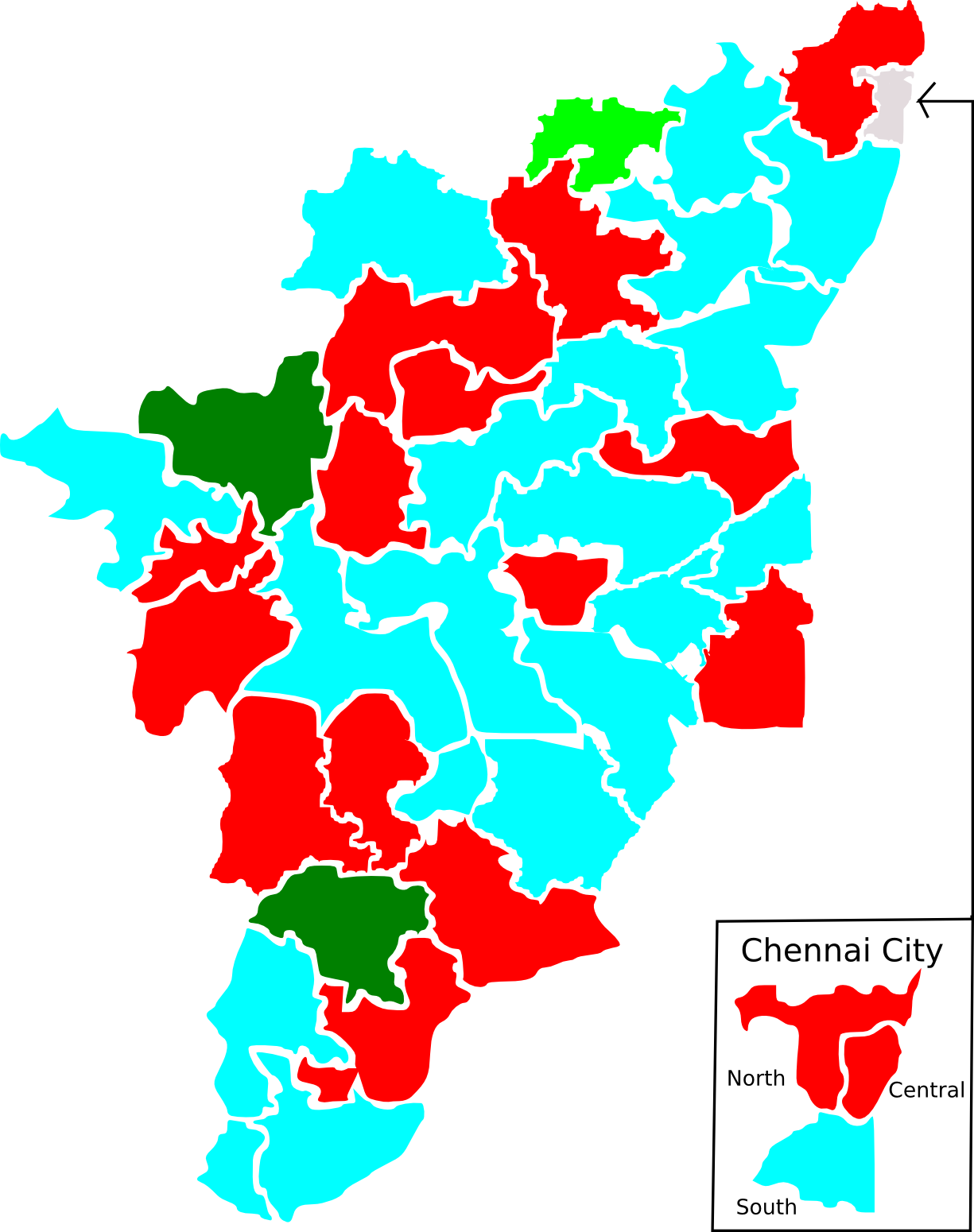
Election map of results based on parties. Colours are based on the results table on the left

| Alliance | Party | Popular Vote | Percentage | Swing | Seats won | Seat Change |
|---|---|---|---|---|---|---|
| DMK+ | Indian National Congress (Indira) | 5,821,411 | 31.62% | ▲9.35% | 20 | ▲6 |
| DMK+ | Dravida Munnetra Kazhagam | 4,236,537 | 23.01% | ▲4.40% | 16 | ▲14 |
| DMK+ | Independent | 232,567 | 1.26% | | 1 | |
| DMK+ | Total | 10,290,515 | 55.89% | ▲15.01% | 37 | ▲21 |
| AIADMK+ | All India Anna Dravida Munnetra Kazhagam | 4,674,064 | 25.38% | ▼4.66% | 2 | ▼15 |
| AIADMK+ | Janata Party | 1,465,782 | 7.96% | ▼9.71% | 0 | ▼3 |
| AIADMK+ | Communist Party of India | 660,940 | 3.59% | ▼1.01% | 0 | ▼3 |
| AIADMK+ | Communist Party of India (Marxist) | 591,869 | 3.21% | ▲1.65% | 0 | Steady |
| AIADMK+ | Total | 7,392,655 | 40.14% | ▼13.73% | 2 | ▼21 |
| Janata Party (Secular) | | 98,729 | 0.54% | new party | 0 | new party |
| Indian National Congress (Urs) | | 41,671 | 0.23% | new party | 0 | new party |
| Republican Party of India | | 9,497 | 0.05% | ▲0.03% | 0 | Steady |
| Independents | | 579,677 | 3.15% | ▼2.07% | 0 | Steady |
| Total | | 18,412,744 | 100.00% | Steady | 39 | Steady |
| Valid Votes | | 18,412,744 | 98.11% | | | |
| Invalid Votes | | 355,074 | 1.89% | | | |
| Total Votes | | 18,767,818 | 100.00% | | | |
| Registered Voters/Turnout | | 28,113,893 | 66.76% | ▼0.37% | | |

- The All India Anna Dravida Munnetra Kazhagam was part of an alliance with Indira Congress in 1977, while the DMK is in alliance with them for the 1980 election

== List of Elected MPs ==
| Constituency | | Winner | | | | Runner Up | | | | Margin | % |
| # | Name | Candidate | Party | Votes | % | Candidate | Party | Votes | % | Margin | % |
|---|---|---|---|---|---|---|---|---|---|---|---|
| 1 | Madras North | G. Lakshmanan | DMK | 297,268 | 57.33 | M. S. M. Abdul Khader | ADMK | 197,950 | 38.18 | 99,318 | 19.15 |
| 2 | Madras Central | A. Kalanithi | DMK | 290,199 | 59.54 | P. Ramachandran | JP | 185,150 | 37.99 | 105,049 | 21.55 |
| 3 | Madras South | Ramaswamy Venkataraman | INC(I) | 328,836 | 60.34 | E. V. K. Sampath | ADMK | 208,474 | 38.25 | 120,362 | 22.09 |
| 4 | Sriperumbudur (SC) | T. Nagaratnam | DMK | 253,912 | 57.45 | S. Jaganathan | ADMK | 171,135 | 38.72 | 82,777 | 18.73 |
| 5 | Chengalpattu | Era. Anbarasu | INC(I) | 283,163 | 59.86 | R. Mohanarangam | ADMK | 173,147 | 36.61 | 110,016 | 23.25 |
| 6 | Arakkonam | A. M. Velu | INC(I) | 278,516 | 60.83 | A. M. Ragunathan | ADMK | 161,155 | 35.20 | 117,361 | 25.63 |
| 7 | Vellore | A. K. A. Abdul Samad | IND | 232,567 | 55.11 | V. Dhandayuthapani | JP | 153,021 | 36.26 | 79,546 | 18.85 |
| 8 | Tiruppattur | S. Murugian | DMK | 274,216 | 62.84 | M. Pandurangan | ADMK | 158,855 | 36.40 | 115,361 | 26.44 |
| 9 | Vandavasi | D. Pattuswamy | INC(I) | 285,549 | 62.36 | C. A. Venugopal Gounder | ADMK | 158,395 | 34.59 | 127,154 | 27.77 |
| 10 | Tindivanam | S. S. Ramaswamy Padayatchi | INC(I) | 290,069 | 65.50 | V. Munuswamy Thirukkuralar | ADMK | 133,171 | 30.07 | 156,898 | 35.43 |
| 11 | Cuddalore | R. Muthukumaran | INC(I) | 262,694 | 59.39 | Arvinda Bala Pajanor | ADMK | 154,043 | 34.83 | 108,651 | 24.56 |
| 12 | Chidambaram (SC) | V. Kulandaivelu | DMK | 302,523 | 63.59 | S. Mahalingam | CPI(M) | 163,798 | 34.43 | 138,725 | 29.16 |
| 13 | Dharmapuri | K. Arjunan | DMK | 209,603 | 55.55 | G. Buvarahan | JP | 142,732 | 37.83 | 66,871 | 17.72 |
| 14 | Krishnagiri | K. Ramamurthy | INC(I) | 222,839 | 63.03 | V. Rajahagopal | ADMK | 122,328 | 34.60 | 100,511 | 28.43 |
| 15 | Rasipuram (SC) | B. Devarajan | INC(I) | 236,112 | 54.58 | S. Anbalagan | ADMK | 176,240 | 40.74 | 59,872 | 13.84 |
| 16 | Salem | C. Palaniappan | DMK | 233,971 | 50.85 | P. Kamnan | ADMK | 207,713 | 45.14 | 26,258 | 5.71 |
| 17 | Tiruchengode | M. Kandaswamy | DMK | 276,015 | 51.51 | R. Kolanthaivelu | ADMK | 254,797 | 47.55 | 21,218 | 3.96 |
| 18 | Nilgiris | R. Prabhu | INC(I) | 273,614 | 57.18 | T. T. S. Thippiah | JP | 187,871 | 39.26 | 85,743 | 17.92 |
| 19 | Gobichettipalayam | G. Chinnasamy | ADMK | 210,808 | 49.90 | N. R. Thiruvankadam | INC(I) | 196,933 | 46.62 | 13,875 | 3.28 |
| 20 | Coimbatore | Ram Era Mohan | DMK | 276,975 | 54.29 | Parvathi Krishnan | CPI | 220,866 | 43.29 | 56,109 | 11.00 |
| 21 | Pollachi (SC) | C. T. Dhandapani | DMK | 233,261 | 51.41 | M. A. M. Natarajan | ADMK | 217,526 | 47.94 | 15,735 | 3.47 |
| 22 | Palani | A. Sanapathi Goundar | INC(I) | 230,733 | 53.41 | P. S. K. Lakshimipathyraju | JP | 171,165 | 39.62 | 59,568 | 13.79 |
| 23 | Dindigul | K. Maya Thevar | DMK | 244,669 | 51.78 | V. Rajan Chellappa | ADMK | 217,923 | 46.12 | 26,746 | 5.66 |
| 24 | Madurai | A. G. Subburaman | INC(I) | 292,380 | 55.57 | A. Balassubramanyam | CPI(M) | 223,185 | 42.42 | 69,195 | 13.15 |
| 25 | Periyakulam | N. Natarajan Cumbum | DMK | 255,204 | 51.30 | S. Ramasamy | ADMK | 235,322 | 47.30 | 19,882 | 4.00 |
| 26 | Karur | S. A. Dorai Sebastian | INC(I) | 281,149 | 55.48 | K. Kanagaraj | ADMK | 207,015 | 40.85 | 74,134 | 14.63 |
| 27 | Tiruchirappalli | N. Selvaraju | DMK | 278,485 | 54.32 | T. K. Rangarajan | CPI(M) | 204,886 | 39.96 | 73,599 | 14.36 |
| 28 | Perambalur (SC) | K. B. S. Mani | INC(I) | 282,767 | 58.89 | S. Thangaraju | ADMK | 183,595 | 38.24 | 99,172 | 20.65 |
| 29 | Mayiladuthurai | N. Kudanthai Ramalingam | INC(I) | 291,625 | 57.20 | S. Govindasamy | JP | 199,620 | 39.16 | 92,005 | 18.04 |
| 30 | Nagapattinam (SC) | Karunanithi-Thazhai | DMK | 278,561 | 50.98 | K. Murugayan | CPI | 267,887 | 49.02 | 10,674 | 1.96 |
| 31 | Thanjavur | S. Singaravadivel | INC(I) | 268,382 | 52.94 | K. Thangamuthu | ADMK | 223,843 | 44.15 | 44,539 | 8.79 |
| 32 | Pudukkottai | V. N. Swamynathan | INC(I) | 294,494 | 49.92 | Kuzha Chellaiya | ADMK | 278,395 | 47.19 | 16,099 | 2.73 |
| 33 | Sivaganga | R. V. Swaminathan | INC(I) | 306,748 | 60.81 | D. Pandian | CPI | 172,187 | 34.14 | 134,561 | 26.67 |
| 34 | Ramanathapuram | M. S. K. Sathiyendran | DMK | 275,049 | 56.66 | P. Anbalagan | ADMK | 190,916 | 39.33 | 84,133 | 17.33 |
| 35 | Sivakasi | N. Sourdararajan | ADMK | 234,654 | 46.07 | V. Jayalakshmi | INC(I) | 228,042 | 44.77 | 6,612 | 1.30 |
| 36 | Tirunelveli | D. S. A. Sivaprakasam | DMK | 256,626 | 54.89 | V. Arunachalam | ADMK | 196,664 | 42.06 | 59,962 | 12.83 |
| 37 | Tenkasi (SC) | M. Arunachalam | INC(I) | 272,260 | 62.42 | S. Rajagopalan | JP | 163,944 | 37.58 | 108,316 | 24.84 |
| 38 | Tiruchendur | K. T. Kosalram | INC(I) | 227,395 | 51.78 | N. Sounthara Pandian | JP | 113,576 | 25.86 | 113,819 | 25.92 |
| 39 | Nagercoil | N. Dennis | INC(I) | 187,111 | 51.32 | P. Vijayaraghavan | JP | 148,703 | 40.78 | 38,408 | 10.54 |

== Post-election Union Council of Ministers from Tamil Nadu ==
| # | Name | Constituency | Designation | Department | From | To | Party |
|---|---|---|---|---|---|---|---|
| 1 | R. Venkataraman | Madras South | Cabinet Minister | Finance | 14 Jan 1980 | 15 Jan 1982 | INC(I) |
| 1 | R. Venkataraman | Madras South | Cabinet Minister | Industry | 16 Jan 1980 | 3 Apr 1980 | INC(I) |
| 1 | R. Venkataraman | Madras South | Cabinet Minister | Defence | 15 Jan 1982 | 2 Aug 1984 | INC(I) |
| 1 | R. Venkataraman | Madras South | Cabinet Minister | Home Affairs | 22 June 1982 | 2 Sept 1982 | INC(I) |
| 2 | R. V. Swaminathan | Sivaganga | MoS | Agriculture | 14 Jan 1980 | 29 Jan 1983 | INC(I) |
| 2 | R. V. Swaminathan | Sivaganga | MoS | Rural Reconstruction | 24 Nov 1980 | 29 Jan 1983 | INC(I) |

== See also ==
- Elections in Tamil Nadu

== Bypolls (1980-1984) ==
| District | Constituency | | Winner | | | | Runner up | | | | Margin |
| District | No. | Name | Candidate | Party | Votes | % | Candidate | Party | Votes | % | Margin |
|---|---|---|---|---|---|---|---|---|---|---|---|
| Theni | | Periyakulam | S. T. K. Jakkaiyan | AIADMK | 252,377 | 50.1% | N. Eramakrishnan | DMK | 183,117 | 36.4% | 69,260 |
| Theni | | Periyakulam | Bypoll held on 1982 following the death of the incumbent member Cumbum N. Natarajan from Dravida Munnetra Kazhagam on 1982. | | | | | | | | |

== Bibliography ==
- Volume I, 1980 Indian general election, 7th Lok Sabha
