= Kalanidhi =

Kalanidhi or Kalanithi may refer to:

- Chandra, Hindu lunar god, known as Kalā (digit) + nidhi (treasure)
- Shiva, major Hindu deity, known as Kāla (time) + nidhi (treasure)
- Kalanidhi Indira Sangeet Mahavidyalaya, a Nepal classical music school
- Sangeetha Kalanidhi, an award given by the Madras Music Academy

== People with the surname ==
- A. Kalanithi, Indian politician
- Kalanithi Maran, Indian media baron
- Kalanidhi Narayanan, Indian dancer
- Kalanidhi Veeraswamy, Indian politician
- Manju Latha Kalanidhi, Indian journalist
- Paul Kalanithi, Indian-American neurosurgeon
