= List of constituencies of the Tamil Nadu Legislative Assembly =

The Tamil Nadu Legislative Assembly is the unicameral legislature of the state of Tamil Nadu, in south India. It has existed since 1 November 1986. As of 2022, it comprises members from 234 constituencies, who are democratically elected using the first-past-the-post system. The presiding officer of the Assembly is called the Speaker. The term of the Assembly is five years unless it is dissolved earlier.

== Current list of constituencies ==
Map of TN Assembly constituencies

Constituencies were delimited in 2007 based on the 2001 Census of India and following draft proposals. Some constituencies are reserved for candidates from the Scheduled Castes and Scheduled Tribes. The first general elections following the delimitation exercise were those of 2011.

#	Constituency	Reserved	Electors As per Feb 2026 SIR	Change Prev. Election	District	Lok Sabha constituency	Constituency since	Constituency Map
1	Gummidipoondi	-	254,129	10.68%▼	Thiruvallur	Tiruvallur	1967	
2	Ponneri	SC	251,397	6.89%▼	Thiruvallur	Tiruvallur	1952	
3	Tiruttani	-	261,857	10.51%▼	Thiruvallur	Arakkonam	1952	
4	Thiruvallur	-	251,018	9.54%▼	Thiruvallur	Tiruvallur	1952	
5	Poonamallee	SC	368,634	1.62% ▲	Thiruvallur	Tiruvallur	1977	
6	Avadi	-	436,177	3.48%▼	Thiruvallur	Tiruvallur	2011	
7	Maduravoyal	-	373,283	19.16%▼	Chennai	Sriperumbudur	2011	
8	Ambattur	-	337,019	14.02%▼	Chennai	Sriperumbudur	2011	
9	Madavaram	-	431,796	7.42%▼	Chennai	Tiruvallur	2011	
10	Thiruvottiyur	-	244,903	21.38%▼	Chennai	Chennai North	1967	
11	Dr. Radhakrishnan Nagar		199,359	25.52%▼	Chennai	Chennai North	1977	
12	Perambur	-	226,296	29.47%▼	Chennai	Chennai North	1952	
13	Kolathur	-	211,772	26.28%▼	Chennai	Chennai North	2011	
14	Villivakkam	-	163,372	37.42%▼	Chennai	Chennai Central	1977	
15	Thiru-Vi-Ka-Nagar	SC	181,621	18.51%▼	Chennai	Chennai North	2011	
16	Egmore	SC	138,775	50.79%▼	Chennai	Chennai Central	1957	
17	Royapuram	-	159,654	18.53%▼	Chennai	Chennai North	1977	
18	Harbour	-	120,126	33.49%▼	Chennai	Chennai Central	1952	
19	Chepauk-Thiruvallikeni	-	166,023	29.99%▼	Chennai	Chennai Central	2011	
20	Thousand Lights	-	157,529	35.89%▼	Chennai	Chennai Central	1952	
21	Anna Nagar	-	188,861	36.58%▼	Chennai	Chennai Central	1977	
22	Virugampakkam	-	200,578	32.61%▼	Chennai	Chennai South	2011	
23	Saidapet	-	204,146	28.06%▼	Chennai	Chennai South	1952	
24	Thiyagarayanagar	-	158,757	36.76%▼	Chennai	Chennai South	1957	
25	Mylapore	-	199,465	28.02%▼	Chennai	Chennai South	1952	
26	Velachery	-	217,171	32.70%▼	Chennai	Chennai South	2011	
27	Sholinganallur	-	553,905	23.16%▼	Chennai	Chennai South	2011	
28	Alandur	-	301,055	23.90%▼	Chennai	Sriperumbudur	1977	
29	Sriperumbudur	SC	381,750	5.83% ▲	Kancheepuram	Sriperumbudur	1952	
30	Pallavaram	-	336,963	24.29%▼	Chengalpattu	Sriperumbudur	2011	
31	Tambaram	-	330,060	22.10%▼	Chengalpattu	Sriperumbudur	1977	
32	Chengalpattu	-	372,839	14.47%▼	Chengalpattu	Kanchipuram	1952	
33	Thiruporur	-	294,410	1.77%▼	Chengalpattu	Kanchipuram	1952	
34	Cheyyur	SC	203,998	11.15%▼	Chengalpattu	Kanchipuram	2011	
35	Madurantakam	SC	212,639	6.79%▼	Chengalpattu	Kanchipuram	1952	
36	Uthiramerur	-	246,177	6.32%▼	Kancheepuram	Kanchipuram	1952	
37	Kancheepuram	-	278,775	10.62%▼	Kancheepuram	Kanchipuram	1952	
38	Arakkonam	SC	200,773	9.79%▼	Ranipet	Arakkonam	1952	
39	Sholingur	-	257,522	7.69%▼	Ranipet	Arakkonam	1952	
40	Katpadi	-	228,736	9.16%▼	Vellore	Arakkonam	1962	
41	Ranipet	-	248,244	7.74%▼	Ranipet	Arakkonam	1952	
42	Arcot	-	245,319	7.20%▼	Ranipet	Arakkonam	1952	
43	Vellore	-	214,504	16.59%▼	Vellore	Vellore	1952	
44	Anaikattu	-	238,715	7.79%▼	Vellore	Vellore	1977	
45	Kilvaithinankuppam	SC	215,304	6.07%▼	Vellore	Vellore	2011	
46	Gudiyatham	SC	251,588	14.21%▼	Vellore	Vellore	1952	
47	Vaniyambadi	-	242,540	3.66%▼	Tirupattur	Vellore	1952	
48	Ambur	-	214,469	10.66%▼	Tirupattur	Vellore	1957	
49	Jolarpet	-	236,127	2.33%▼	Tirupattur	Tiruvannamalai	2011	
50	Tiruppattur	-	226,691	5.71%▼	Tirupattur	Tiruvannamalai	1952	
51	Uthangarai	SC	235,451	1.81%▼	Krishnagiri	Krishnagiri	2011	
52	Bargur	-	239,318	3.93%▼	Krishnagiri	Krishnagiri	1977	
53	Krishnagiri	-	267,366	0.42%▼	Krishnagiri	Krishnagiri	1952	
54	Veppanahalli	-	246,093	2.97%▼	Krishnagiri	Krishnagiri	2011	
55	Hosur	-	342,989	3.82%▼	Krishnagiri	Krishnagiri	1952	
56	Thalli	-	237,924	6.05%▼	Krishnagiri	Krishnagiri	1977	
57	Palacode	-	240,322	0.04% ▲	Dharmapuri	Dharamapuri	1967	
58	Pennagaram	-	248,614	0.19%▼	Dharmapuri	Dharamapuri	1952	
59	Dharmapuri	-	260,751	4.30%▼	Dharmapuri	Dharamapuri	1952	
60	Pappireddippatti	-	256,640	4.08%▼	Dharmapuri	Dharamapuri	2011	
61	Harur	SC	245,692	2.55%▼	Dharmapuri	Dharamapuri	1952	
62	Chengam	SC	268,997	3.03%▼	Tiruvannamalai	Tiruvannamalai	1952	
63	Tiruvannamalai	-	249,848	13.64%▼	Tiruvannamalai	Tiruvannamalai	1957	
64	Kilpennathur	-	240,823	5.61%▼	Tiruvannamalai	Tiruvannamalai	2011	
65	Kalasapakkam	-	232,847	4.96%▼	Tiruvannamalai	Tiruvannamalai	1952	
66	Polur	-	233,774	4.68%▼	Tiruvannamalai	Arani	1952	
67	Arani	-	254,963	8.36%▼	Tiruvannamalai	Arani	1952	
68	Cheyyar	-	239,856	8.31%▼	Tiruvannamalai	Arani	1952	
69	Vandavasi	SC	213,474	11.94%▼	Tiruvannamalai	Arani	1952	
70	Gingee	-	242,667	7.60%▼	Viluppuram	Arani	1952	
71	Mailam	-	209,016	5.71%▼	Viluppuram	Arani	2011	
72	Tindivanam	SC	219,256	5.60%▼	Viluppuram	Viluppuram	1952	
73	Vanur	SC	209,824	8.19%▼	Viluppuram	Viluppuram	1962	
74	Villupuram	-	245,899	6.86%▼	Viluppuram	Viluppuram	1952	
75	Vikravandi	-	228,995	3.10%▼	Viluppuram	Viluppuram	1952	
76	Tirukkoyilur	-	243,105	5.23%▼	Kallakurichi	Viluppuram	1952	
77	Ulundurpettai	-	300,699	1.40% ▲	Kallakurichi	Viluppuram	1952	
78	Rishivandiyam	-	273,571	0.86% ▲	Kallakurichi	Kallakurichi	1962	
79	Sankarapuram	-	265,951	2.01%▼	Kallakurichi	Kallakurichi	1962	
80	Kallakurichi	SC	281,582	2.74%▼	Kallakurichi	Kallakurichi	1952	
81	Gangavalli	SC	218,317	9.28%▼	Salem	Kallakurichi	2011	
82	Attur	SC	228,153	11.08%▼	Salem	Kallakurichi	1952	
83	Yercaud	ST	272,829	4.75%▼	Salem	Kallakurichi	1957	
84	Omalur	-	294,593	1.36%▼	Salem	Salem	1952	
85	Mettur	-	255,665	11.57%▼	Salem	Dharamapuri	1957	
86	Edappadi	-	276,387	3.91%▼	Salem	Salem	1952	
87	Sankari	-	260,525	5.67%▼	Salem	Namakkal	1957	
88	Salem (West)	-	257,950	14.78%▼	Salem	Salem	2011	
89	Salem (North)	-	238,637	14.47%▼	Salem	Salem	2011	
90	Salem (South)	-	226,851	13.93%▼	Salem	Salem	2011	
91	Veerapandi	-	250,449	4.46%▼	Salem	Salem	1957	
92	Rasipuram	SC	222,252	6.75%▼	Namakkal	Namakkal	1952	
93	Senthamangalam	ST	229,398	6.63%▼	Namakkal	Namakkal	1957	
94	Namakkal	-	237,836	8.70%▼	Namakkal	Namakkal	1952	
95	Paramathi Velur	-	205,147	8.14%▼	Namakkal	Namakkal	2011	
96	Tiruchengodu	-	209,072	10.46%▼	Namakkal	Namakkal	1952	
97	Kumarapalayam	-	220,048	14.63%▼	Namakkal	Erode	2011	
98	Erode (East)	-	179,566	22.56%▼	Erode	Erode	2011	
99	Erode (West)	-	250,177	16.23%▼	Erode	Erode	2011	
100	Modakkurichi	-	207,664	13.72%▼	Erode	Erode	1952	
101	Dharapuram	SC	222,406	14.62%▼	Tiruppur	Erode	1952	
102	Kangayam	-	219,553	15.74%▼	Tiruppur	Erode	1952	
103	Perundurai	-	214,431	6.93%▼	Erode	Tiruppur	1957	
104	Bhavani	-	223,172	7.24%▼	Erode	Tiruppur	1952	
105	Anthiyur	-	207,355	6.29%▼	Erode	Tiruppur	1962	
106	Gobichettipalayam	-	239,179	7.33%▼	Erode	Tiruppur	1957	
107	Bhavanisagar	SC	237,613	9.48%▼	Erode	Nilgiris	1967	
108	Udhagamandalam	-	188,826	8.96%▼	Nilgiris	Nilgiris	1957	
109	Gudalur	SC	185,398	2.82%▼	Nilgiris	Nilgiris	1967	
110	Coonoor	-	177,782	8.39%▼	Nilgiris	Nilgiris	1957	
111	Mettupalayam	-	282,179	5.87%▼	Coimbatore	Nilgiris	1952	
112	Avanashi	SC	253,361	10.77%▼	Tiruppur	Nilgiris	1957	
113	Tiruppur (North)	-	315,837	18.20%▼	Tiruppur	Tiruppur	2011	
114	Tiruppur (South)	-	197,091	29.97%▼	Tiruppur	Tiruppur	2011	
115	Palladam	-	329,849	17.25%▼	Tiruppur	Coimbatore	1957	
116	Sulur	-	307,616	4.28%▼	Coimbatore	Coimbatore	1957	
117	Kavundampalayam	-	422,138	12.41%▼	Coimbatore	Coimbatore	2011	
118	Coimbatore (North)	-	296,939	13.91%▼	Coimbatore	Coimbatore	2011	
119	Thondamuthur	-	293,324	12.05%▼	Coimbatore	Pollachi	1952	
120	Coimbatore (South)	-	188,878	26.21%▼	Coimbatore	Coimbatore	2011	
121	Singanallur	-	269,941	18.19%▼	Coimbatore	Coimbatore	1971	
122	Kinathukadavu	-	305,878	8.07%▼	Coimbatore	Pollachi	1967	
123	Pollachi	-	203,971	11.03%▼	Coimbatore	Pollachi	1952	
124	Valparai	SC	173,608	16.15%▼	Coimbatore	Pollachi	1967	
125	Udumalaipettai	-	230,976	15.29%▼	Tiruppur	Pollachi	1952	
126	Madathukulam	-	214,809	14.39%▼	Tiruppur	Pollachi		
127	Palani	-	239,795	14.38%▼	Dindigul	Dindigul		
128	Oddanchatram	-	220,238	9.75%▼	Dindigul	Dindigul		
129	Athoor	-	261,843	10.84%▼	Dindigul	Dindigul		
130	Nilakottai	SC	221,094	10.23%▼	Dindigul	Dindigul		
131	Natham	-	261,152	8.71%▼	Dindigul	Dindigul		
132	Dindigul	-	241,926	14.07%▼	Dindigul	Dindigul		
133	Vedasandur	-	243,774	8.16%▼	Dindigul	Karur		
134	Aravakurichi	-	195,517	9.09%▼	Karur	Karur		
135	Karur	-	229,995	7.62%▼	Karur	Karur		
136	Krishnarayapuram	SC	202,994	5.10%▼	Karur	Karur		
137	Kulithalai	-	223,184	2.24%▼	Karur	Perambalur		
138	Manapaarai	-	267,999	8.18%▼	Tiruchirappalli	Karur		
139	Srirangam	-	287,027	8.94%▼	Tiruchirappalli	Tiruchirappalli		
140	Tiruchirappalli (West)	-	238,920	12.37%▼	Tiruchirappalli	Tiruchirappalli	2011	
141	Tiruchirappalli (East)	-	220,191	14.76%▼	Tiruchirappalli	Tiruchirappalli	2011	
142	Thiruverumbur	-	259,546	12.55%▼	Tiruchirappalli	Tiruchirappalli		
143	Lalgudi	-	212,177	3.25%▼	Tiruchirappalli	Perambalur		
144	Manachanallur	-	236,500	4.09%▼	Tiruchirappalli	Perambalur		
145	Musiri	-	214,006	8.67%▼	Tiruchirappalli	Perambalur		
146	Thuraiyur	SC	210,685	7.58%▼	Tiruchirappalli	Perambalur		
147	Perambalur	SC	290,666	4.71%▼	Perambalur	Perambalur		
148	Kunnam	-	268,095	2.48%▼	Perambalur	Chidambaram		
149	Ariyalur	-	262,942	1.44%▼	Ariyalur	Chidambaram		
150	Jayankondam	-	263,450	1.68%▼	Ariyalur	Chidambaram		
151	Tittakudi	SC	208,984	5.75%▼	Cuddalore	Cuddalore		
152	Virudhachalam	-	240,783	5.94%▼	Cuddalore	Cuddalore		
153	Neyveli	-	191,271	13.53%▼	Cuddalore	Cuddalore		
154	Panruti	-	241,767	2.20%▼	Cuddalore	Cuddalore		
155	Cuddalore	-	223,149	7.22%▼	Cuddalore	Cuddalore		
156	Kurinjipadi	-	238,189	2.82%▼	Cuddalore	Cuddalore		
157	Bhuvanagiri	-	233,259	6.93%▼	Cuddalore	Chidambaram		
158	Chidambaram	-	231,236	8.71%▼	Cuddalore	Chidambaram		
159	Kattumannarkoil	SC	226,333	1.92%▼	Cuddalore	Chidambaram		
160	Sirkazhi	SC	241,319	5.16%▼	Mayiladuthurai	Mayiladuthurai		
161	Mayiladuthurai	-	234,554	5.43%▼	Mayiladuthurai	Mayiladuthurai		
162	Poompuhar	-	259,262	6.78%▼	Mayiladuthurai	Mayiladuthurai		
163	Nagapattinam	-	174,683	12.59%▼	Nagapattinam	Nagapattinam		
164	Kilvelur	SC	170,558	5.46%▼	Nagapattinam	Nagapattinam		
165	Vedaranyam	-	187,439	3.44%▼	Nagapattinam	Nagapattinam		
166	Thiruthuraipoondi	SC	226,845	6.13%▼	Thiruvarur	Nagapattinam		
167	Mannargudi	-	234,430	10.81%▼	Thiruvarur	Thanjavur		
168	Thiruvarur	-	260,027	8.78%▼	Thiruvarur	Nagapattinam		
169	Nannilam	-	267,432	2.83%▼	Thiruvarur	Nagapattinam		
170	Thiruvidaimarudur	SC	256,930	1.92%▼	Thanjavur	Mayiladuthurai		
171	Kumbakonam	-	254,318	7.75%▼	Thanjavur	Mayiladuthurai		
172	Papanasam	-	256,518	2.26%▼	Thanjavur	Mayiladuthurai		
173	Thiruvaiyaru	-	258,374	4.46%▼	Thanjavur	Thanjavur		
174	Thanjavur	-	252,676	14.34%▼	Thanjavur	Thanjavur	1952	
175	Orathanadu	-	233,542	5.03%▼	Thanjavur	Thanjavur	1967	
176	Pattukkottai	-	242,420	2.00%▼	Thanjavur	Thanjavur	1952	
177	Peravurani	-	213,946	3.33%▼	Thanjavur	Thanjavur	1967	
178	Gandarvakottai	SC	196,024	3.37%▼	Pudukkottai	Tiruchirappalli	1957	
179	Viralimalai	-	225,090	0.93%▼	Pudukkottai	Karur	1967	
180	Pudukkottai	-	225,944	8.24%▼	Pudukkottai	Tiruchirappalli	1952	
181	Thirumayam	-	220,568	3.75%▼	Pudukkottai	Sivaganga	1952	
182	Alangudi	-	212,078	3.21%▼	Pudukkottai	Sivaganga	1957	
183	Aranthangi	-	229,792	3.98%▼	Pudukkottai	Ramanathapuram	1952	
184	Karaikudi	-	305,925	4.31%▼	Sivaganga	Sivaganga	1952	
185	Tiruppattur	-	275,904	6.25%▼	Sivaganga	Sivaganga	1952	
186	Sivaganga	-	278,124	8.30%▼	Sivaganga	Sivaganga	1952	
187	Manamadurai	SC	259,382	7.25%▼	Sivaganga	Sivaganga	1952	
188	Melur	-	229,821	7.02%▼	Madurai	Madurai	1952	
189	Madurai East	-	336,527	0.61% ▲	Madurai	Madurai	1962	
190	Sholavandan	SC	214,785	1.67%▼	Madurai	Theni	1962	
191	Madurai North	-	221,174	10.15%▼	Madurai	Madurai	1952	
192	Madurai South	-	179,919	22.83%▼	Madurai	Madurai	1952	
193	Madurai Central	-	199,618	18.63%▼	Madurai	Madurai	1962	
194	Madurai West	-	275,516	11.66%▼	Madurai	Madurai	1967	
195	Thiruparankundram	-	311,400	4.27%▼	Madurai	Virudhunagar	1957	
196	Thirumangalam	-	261,238	7.29%▼	Madurai	Virudhunagar	1952	
197	Usilampatti	-	266,192	7.27%▼	Madurai	Theni	1957	
198	Andipatti	-	256,529	8.55%▼	Theni	Theni	1962	
199	Periyakulam	SC	265,830	7.68%▼	Theni	Theni	1952	
200	Bodinayakanur	-	263,292	6.16%▼	Theni	Theni	1957	
201	Cumbum	-	255,888	12.01%▼	Theni	Theni	1952	
202	Rajapalayam	-	214,192	11.38%▼	Virudhunagar	Tenkasi	1962	
203	Srivilliputhur	SC	224,122	11.28%▼	Virudhunagar	Tenkasi	1952	
204	Sattur	-	229,330	10.03%▼	Virudhunagar	Virudhunagar	1952	
205	Sivakasi	-	228,205	13.88%▼	Virudhunagar	Virudhunagar	1957	
206	Virudhunagar	-	200,618	11.37%▼	Virudhunagar	Virudhunagar	1952	
207	Aruppukkottai	-	207,750	7.54%▼	Virudhunagar	Virudhunagar	1952	
208	Tiruchuli	-	205,301	7.58%▼	Virudhunagar	Ramanathapuram	1962	
209	Paramakudi	SC	234,608	8.69%▼	Ramanathapuram	Ramanathapuram	1952	
210	Tiruvadanai	-	283,864	3.03%▼	Ramanathapuram	Ramanathapuram	1957	
211	Ramanathapuram	-	312,303	0.61% ▲	Ramanathapuram	Ramanathapuram	1952	
212	Mudhukulathur	-	298,958	4.18%▼	Ramanathapuram	Ramanathapuram	1952	
213	Vilathikulam	-	204,982	5.92%▼	Thoothukudi	Thoothukkudi	1952	
214	Thoothukkudi	-	250,587	13.03%▼	Thoothukudi	Thoothukkudi	1952	
215	Tiruchendur	-	232,933	5.89%▼	Thoothukudi	Thoothukkudi	1952	
216	Srivaikuntam	-	214,268	5.12%▼	Thoothukudi	Thoothukkudi	1957	
217	Ottapidaram	SC	243,756	3.88%▼	Thoothukudi	Thoothukkudi	1962	
218	Kovilpatti	-	241,660	9.74%▼	Thoothukudi	Thoothukkudi	1952	
219	Sankarankovil	SC	238,082	6.97%▼	Tenkasi	Tenkasi	1952	
220	Vasudevanallur	SC	228,557	5.70%▼	Tenkasi	Tenkasi	1967	
221	Kadayanallur	-	269,220	7.73%▼	Tenkasi	Tenkasi	1967	
222	Tenkasi	-	281,624	4.31%▼	Tenkasi	Tenkasi	1952	
223	Alangulam	-	255,457	2.70%▼	Tenkasi	Tirunelveli	1952	
224	Tirunelveli	-	275,857	6.46%▼	Tirunelveli	Tirunelveli	1952	
225	Ambasamudram	-	227,878	7.74%▼	Tirunelveli	Tirunelveli	1952	
226	Palayamkottai	-	257,329	6.68%▼	Tirunelveli	Tirunelveli	1977	
227	Nanguneri	-	257,177	8.34%▼	Tirunelveli	Tirunelveli	1952	
228	Radhapuram	-	247,061	9.71%▼	Tirunelveli	Tirunelveli	1957	
229	Kanniyakumari	-	288,867	41.40% ▲	Kanniyakumari	Kanniyakumari		
230	Nagercoil	-	258,928	4.95%▼	Kanniyakumari	Kanniyakumari	1952	
231	Colachal	-	265,015	1.78%▼	Kanniyakumari	Kanniyakumari	1954	
232	Padmanabhapuram	-	235,511	2.08%▼	Kanniyakumari	Kanniyakumari	1971	
233	Vilavancode	-	226,658	6.11%▼	Kanniyakumari	Kanniyakumari	1952	
234	Killiyoor	-	245,359	3.70%▼	Kanniyakumari	Kanniyakumari	1962	
