= Chepauk Assembly constituency =

State Assembly constituency until 2008

Coordinates: 13.06°N 80.28°E

Chepauk
- Former constituency for the Tamil Nadu Legislative Assembly

Constituency details
- Country: India
- Region: South India
- State: Tamil Nadu
- District: Chennai
- Lok Sabha constituency: Chennai Central
- Established: 1977
- Abolished: 2008
- Total electors: 1,05,252
- Reservation: None

Chepauk was the legislative assembly constituency, that included the city, Chepauk. Chepauk Assembly constituency was part of Chennai Central Lok Sabha constituency. After the constituency delimitation of 2008, this constituency was merged into the newly formed Chepauk-Thiruvallikeni Assembly constituency.

The constituency is famous among people of Tamil Nadu as five-time Chief Minister of Tamil Nadu, M. Karunanidhi contested thrice and won all three times from Chepauk Assembly Constituency.

== Members of the Legislative Assembly ==
Election	Member	Party
1977	A. Rahman Khan	Dravida Munnetra Kazhagam
1980	A. Rahman Khan	Dravida Munnetra Kazhagam
1984	A. Rahman Khan	Dravida Munnetra Kazhagam
1989	M. Abdul Lathief	Dravida Munnetra Kazhagam
1991	Zeenath Sheriffdeen	Indian National Congress
1996	M. Karunanidhi	Dravida Munnetra Kazhagam
2001	M. Karunanidhi	Dravida Munnetra Kazhagam
2006	M. Karunanidhi	Dravida Munnetra Kazhagam

== Election results ==
Vote share of winning candidates
2006	50.96%
2001	51.91%
1996	77.05%
1991	50.62%
1989	50.21%
1984	56.26%
1980	55.64%
1977	38.40%

=== Assembly election 2006 ===
2006 Tamil Nadu Legislative Assembly election : Chepauk
Party	Candidate	Votes	%	±%
DMK	M. Karunanidhi	34,188	50.96%	▼0.95
Independent	Dawoon Miakhan	25,662	38.25%	
DMDK	B. Narayanasamy	3,681	5.49%	New
BJP	R. N. Sivanesan	1,124	1.68%	New
LKPT	Elanthirumaran	669	1.00%	New
Margin of victory		8,526	12.71%	▲4.30
Turnout		67,082	63.73%	▲18.97
Total valid votes		67,082		
Registered electors		105,252		▼18.03
DMK hold		Swing		

=== Assembly election 2001 ===
2001 Tamil Nadu Legislative Assembly election : Chepauk
Party	Candidate	Votes	%	±%
DMK	M. Karunanidhi	29,836	51.91%	▼25.14
INC	R. Damodharan	25,002	43.50%	▲26.26
MDMK	Tamil Maravan	1,395	2.43%	New
Independent	Venugopal. D	450	0.78%	
Margin of victory		4,834	8.41%	▼51.40
Turnout		57,477	44.76%	▼16.55
Total valid votes		57,477		
Registered electors		128,399		▲29.30
DMK hold		Swing		

=== Assembly election 1996 ===
1996 Tamil Nadu Legislative Assembly election : Chepauk
Party	Candidate	Votes	%	±%
DMK	M. Karunanidhi	46,097	77.05%	▲34.05
INC	N. S. S. Nellai Kannan	10,313	17.24%	▼33.38
BJP	Era. Meyappan	1,380	2.31%	▼2.07
JD	S. K. Doraiswamy	925	1.55%	New
Margin of victory		35,784	59.81%	▲52.19
Turnout		60,878	61.31%	▲6.26
Total valid votes		59,827		
Rejected ballots		1,051	1.73%	▲0.19
Registered electors		99,303		▼7.99
DMK gain from INC		Swing	▲26.43	

=== Assembly election 1991 ===
1991 Tamil Nadu Legislative Assembly election : Chepauk
Party	Candidate	Votes	%	±%
INC	Zeenath Sheriffdeen	29,605	50.62%	▲28.24
DMK	K. Anbazhagan	25,149	43.00%	▼7.21
BJP	G. Karthikeyan	2,559	4.38%	New
IUML	S. K. Sham Shahabuddin	609	1.04%	New
Margin of victory		4,456	7.62%	▼20.22
Turnout		59,410	55.05%	▼12.83
Total valid votes		58,482		
Rejected ballots		914	1.54%	▲0.09
Registered electors		107,928		▲9.52
INC gain from DMK		Swing	▲0.41	

=== Assembly election 1989 ===
1989 Tamil Nadu Legislative Assembly election : Chepauk
Party	Candidate	Votes	%	±%
DMK	M. Abdul Lathief	33,104	50.21%	▼6.05
INC	S. M. Hidayathulla	14,751	22.38%	New
AIADMK	A. V. Krishnamoorthy	12,665	19.21%	New
Independent	K. Kondal Kesava Rao Alias Kondal Dassen	3,805	5.77%	
INC(J)	T. R. Janasthnan	418	0.63%	New
Margin of victory		18,353	27.84%	▲13.88
Turnout		66,894	67.88%	▲2.53
Total valid votes		65,925		
Rejected ballots		969	1.45%	▼0.92
Registered electors		98,546		▼2.37
DMK hold		Swing		

=== Assembly election 1984 ===
1984 Tamil Nadu Legislative Assembly election : Chepauk
Party	Candidate	Votes	%	±%
DMK	A. Rahman Khan	36,234	56.26%	▲0.62
AIADMK	S. V. Marimuthu	27,246	42.31%	▲2.40
Margin of victory		8,988	13.96%	▼1.77
Turnout		65,965	65.35%	▲6.54
Total valid votes		64,403		
Rejected ballots		1,562	2.37%	▲1.51
Registered electors		100,943		▲0.37
DMK hold		Swing		

=== Assembly election 1980 ===
1980 Tamil Nadu Legislative Assembly election : Chepauk
Party	Candidate	Votes	%	±%
DMK	A. Rahman Khan	32,627	55.64%	▲17.24
AIADMK	M. S. Abdul Khader	23,401	39.91%	New
JP	S. V. Kandasamy	2,517	4.29%	New
Margin of victory		9,226	15.73%	▲5.31
Turnout		59,148	58.81%	▲6.77
Total valid votes		58,639		
Rejected ballots		509	0.86%	▲0.02
Registered electors		100,569		▼18.40
DMK hold		Swing		

=== Assembly election 1977 ===
1977 Tamil Nadu Legislative Assembly election : Chepauk
Party	Candidate	Votes	%	±%
DMK	A. Rahman Khan	24,425	38.40%	New
AIADMK	V. Rajkumar	17,796	27.98%	New
JP	S. V. Kandasamy	13,849	21.77%	New
INC	N. M. Manivarma	7,532	11.84%	New
Margin of victory		6,629	10.42%	
Turnout		64,140	52.04%	
Total valid votes		63,602		
Rejected ballots		538	0.84%	
Registered electors		123,253		
DMK win (new seat)				
