= A. Kalanithi =

Indian politician (died 2020)

Member of the Lok Sabha
- In office 1980–1988
- Preceded by: P. Ramachandran
- Succeeded by: Era. Anbarasu
- Constituency: Chennai Central

Personal details
- Died: September 18, 2020
- Party: Dravida Munnetra Kazhagam

A. Kalanithi (died 18 September 2020) was an Indian politician who served as Member of Parliament elected from Tamil Nadu. He was elected to the Lok Sabha as a Dravida Munnetra Kazhagam candidate from Central Chennai constituency in the 1980 and 1984 elections. He died on September 18, 2020, due to cardiac arrest.
