= Park Town Assembly constituency =

Former constituency in Tamil Nadu, India

Coordinates: 13.08°N 80.28°E

Park Town
- Former constituency for the Tamil Nadu Legislative Assembly

Constituency details
- Country: India
- Region: South India
- State: Tamil Nadu
- District: Chennai
- Lok Sabha constituency: Chennai Central
- Established: 1967
- Abolished: 2008
- Total electors: 117,018
- Reservation: None

Park Town was the legislative assembly, that includes the city, Chennai. Park Town Assembly constituency was part of Chennai Central parliamentary constituency until 2008.

== Members of the Legislative Assembly ==
Assembly	Duration	Winner	Party
Fourth	1967–71	H. V. Hande	Swatantra Party
Fifth	1971–77	H. V. Hande	Swatantra Party
Sixth	1977–80	T. S. Nallathambi	Dravida Munnetra Kazhagam
Seventh	1980–84	N. V. N. Somu	Dravida Munnetra Kazhagam
Eighth	1984–89	K. Anbazhagan	Dravida Munnetra Kazhagam
Ninth	1989–91	A. Rahman Khan	Dravida Munnetra Kazhagam
Tenth	1991–96	U. Baluraman	Indian National Congress
Eleventh	1996–01	T. Rajender	Dravida Munnetra Kazhagam
Twelfth	2001–06	S. G. Vinayakamurthi	Tamil Maanila Congress
Thirteenth	2006–11	K. Srinivasan	All India Anna Dravida Munnetra Kazhagam

== Election results ==
Vote share of winning candidates
2006	47.06%
2001	51.40%
1996	68.43%
1991	55.05%
1989	49.25%
1984	50.89%
1980	55.94%
1977	32.78%
1971	54.70%
1967	51.57%

=== 2006 ===
2006 Tamil Nadu Legislative Assembly election: Park Town
Party	Candidate	Votes	%	±%
AIADMK	K. Srinivasan	34,314	47.06%	
DMK	A. Rahman Khan	27,957	38.34%	−3.13%
DMDK	K. Bala Subramanian	5,300	7.27%	
BJP	C. Kantilal	3,621	4.97%	
BSP	S. Harikrishnan	446	0.61%	−1.29%
TNJC	C. R. Srinivasamoorthy	278	0.38%	
Independent	P. Venkatesan	237	0.33%	
Independent	M. Vijayaragavan	141	0.19%	
Independent	C. Panneerselvam	129	0.18%	
Independent	R. R. Nagarajan	117	0.16%	
Independent	P. N. Yuvakumar	85	0.12%	
Margin of victory		6,357	8.72%	−1.20%
Turnout		72,915	62.31%	16.45%
Registered electors		117,018		
AIADMK gain from TMC(M)		Swing	-4.34%	

=== 2001 ===
2001 Tamil Nadu Legislative Assembly election: Park Town
Party	Candidate	Votes	%	±%
TMC(M)	S. G. Vinayakamurthi	33,031	51.40%	
DMK	T. Rajendar	26,654	41.47%	−26.96%
MDMK	G. Nanmaran	1,590	2.47%	−0.01%
BSP	E. Murugan	1,220	1.90%	
JD(S)	Pe. Govindaswamy	728	1.13%	
Independent	T. V. Rajendhran	400	0.62%	
Independent	N. P. Durai	165	0.26%	
Independent	T. A. Damodaran	141	0.22%	
Independent	T. Rajendran	138	0.21%	
SP	R. Thulasi	103	0.16%	
Independent	D. Thangaraj	98	0.15%	
Margin of victory		6,377	9.92%	−35.34%
Turnout		64,268	45.86%	−12.85%
Registered electors		140,145		
TMC(M) gain from DMK		Swing	-17.04%	

=== 1996 ===
1996 Tamil Nadu Legislative Assembly election: Park Town
Party	Candidate	Votes	%	±%
DMK	T. Rajendar	44,565	68.43%	30.64%
INC	S. V. Shankar	15,086	23.17%	−31.88%
BJP	L. Sundaram	2,183	3.35%	−1.76%
MDMK	Kootharasan	1,620	2.49%	
AIIC(T)	U. Balaraman	1,105	1.70%	
Independent	P. K. Krishnadoss	99	0.15%	
Independent	G. K. Babu	69	0.11%	
Independent	P. Jaya	68	0.10%	
Independent	E. Murugan	56	0.09%	
BMC	K. Radhakrishnan	52	0.08%	
Independent	M. R. K. Sundaram	49	0.08%	
Margin of victory		29,479	45.27%	28.01%
Turnout		65,124	58.71%	3.88%
Registered electors		113,516		
DMK gain from INC		Swing	13.38%	

=== 1991 ===
1991 Tamil Nadu Legislative Assembly election: Park Town
Party	Candidate	Votes	%	±%
INC	U. Balaraman	37,747	55.05%	35.02%
DMK	A. Rahman Khan	25,912	37.79%	−11.46%
BJP	C. Kantilal	3,507	5.11%	1.11%
PMK	P. Elumalai (Choolai)	437	0.64%	
JP	M. Meerankhan	217	0.32%	
Independent	K. Selvarajan	129	0.19%	
AAP	M. Kannan	101	0.15%	
THMM	R. Radhakrishnan	85	0.12%	
Independent	G. R. Balasundaram	78	0.11%	
Independent	D. Ravi	64	0.09%	
Independent	M. Sudhakar	62	0.09%	
Margin of victory		11,835	17.26%	−9.49%
Turnout		68,571	54.83%	−12.77%
Registered electors		127,309		
INC gain from DMK		Swing	5.80%	

=== 1989 ===
1989 Tamil Nadu Legislative Assembly election: Park Town
Party	Candidate	Votes	%	±%
DMK	A. Rahman Khan	37,083	49.25%	−1.64%
AIADMK	Babuji Gautam	16,940	22.50%	
INC	S. G. Vinayagamurthi	15,080	20.03%	
BJP	C. Kantilal	3,014	4.00%	
Independent	M. G. Gurusamy M Devar	2,001	2.66%	
Independent	A. Chandrasekaran	223	0.30%	
INS(SCS)	A. R. Sambandam	168	0.22%	
Independent	Nanmull Jain	111	0.15%	
Independent	B. Manak Chand Nahar	105	0.14%	
Independent	C. Sama Rao	102	0.14%	
Independent	T. Umapathy	93	0.12%	
Margin of victory		20,143	26.75%	22.78%
Turnout		75,296	67.60%	3.81%
Registered electors		113,205		
DMK hold		Swing	-1.64%	

=== 1984 ===
1984 Tamil Nadu Legislative Assembly election: Park Town
Party	Candidate	Votes	%	±%
DMK	K. Anbazhagan	37,540	50.89%	−5.05%
Independent	M. Jothi	34,613	46.92%	
Independent	Patil M. Bachubhai	548	0.74%	
Independent	M. S. Mani	314	0.43%	
Independent	Jagajothi	236	0.32%	
Independent	Mohamed Bilal	201	0.27%	
Independent	M. S. Elango Alias Manoharan	169	0.23%	
Independent	K. Murali	149	0.20%	
Margin of victory		2,927	3.97%	−17.91%
Turnout		73,770	63.79%	6.67%
Registered electors		119,597		
DMK hold		Swing	-5.05%	

=== 1980 ===
1980 Tamil Nadu Legislative Assembly election: Park Town
Party	Candidate	Votes	%	±%
DMK	N. V. N. Somu	38,095	55.94%	23.16%
GKC	S. Lalchand Daga	23,197	34.06%	
JP	A. Arumugha Naicker	6,556	9.63%	
Independent	Nahar Manakchand	146	0.21%	
Independent	C. Jagajothi Alias Govindarajulu	104	0.15%	
Margin of victory		14,898	21.88%	17.16%
Turnout		68,098	57.11%	9.58%
Registered electors		120,797		
DMK hold		Swing	23.16%	

=== 1977 ===
1977 Tamil Nadu Legislative Assembly election: Park Town
Party	Candidate	Votes	%	±%
DMK	T. S. Nallathambi	22,433	32.78%	−12.51%
JP	N. G. Bhuvaneshwari	19,207	28.07%	
AIADMK	B. Ramabadhran	18,598	27.18%	
INC	A. Kuppuswamy	7,429	10.86%	
Independent	C. Govindaragulu Alias Jagagothi	393	0.57%	
Independent	Likmichnad Saklecha	213	0.31%	
Independent	M. Arputhraj	153	0.22%	
Margin of victory		3,226	4.71%	−4.69%
Turnout		68,426	47.53%	−20.63%
Registered electors		145,578		
DMK gain from SWA		Swing	-21.92%	

=== 1971 ===
1971 Tamil Nadu Legislative Assembly election: Park Town
Party	Candidate	Votes	%	±%
SWA	K. Ethirajan	30,743	54.70%	
DMK	A. V. P. Asaithambi	25,456	45.30%	
Margin of victory		5,287	9.41%	4.67%
Turnout		56,199	68.17%	−7.75%
Registered electors		85,813		
SWA hold		Swing	3.13%	

=== 1967 ===
1967 Madras Legislative Assembly election: Park Town
Party	Candidate	Votes	%	±%
SWA	H. V. Hande	29,144	51.57%	
INC	T. N. Anandanayaki	26,465	46.83%	
ABJS	P. C. Kalyanasundaram	384	0.68%	
Independent	K. Ariyasankaran	325	0.58%	
Independent	V. Thanikachalam	191	0.34%	
Margin of victory		2,679	4.74%	
Turnout		56,509	75.92%	
Registered electors		76,470		
SWA win (new seat)				
