= A. Rahman Khan =

Indian politician (died 2020)

Personal details
- Born: A. Rahman Khan; 1942
- Died: 20-08-2020 Chennai, Tamil Nadu, India
- Party: Dravida Munnetra Kazhagam

He was a member of the Tamil Nadu Legislative Assembly, representing the Dravida Munnetra Kazhagam, for Chepauk constituency in the 1977, 1980 and 1984 elections. He was elected as a DMK candidate from Park Town constituency in 1989 and from Ramanathapuram constituency in 1996.

He also served as the Minister for Labour and later, Minister for Revenue in the Government of Tamil Nadu.

He died in 2020 at Chennai, from COVID-19, during the COVID-19 pandemic in India, aged 77.

== Elections Contested ==
=== Tamilnadu State Legislative Assembly Elections Contested ===
Elections	Constituency	Party	Result	Vote percentage	Opposition Candidate	Opposition Party	Opposition vote percentage
1977	Chepauk	DMK	Won	38.40	V. Rajkumar	AIADMK	27.98
1980	Chepauk	DMK	Won	55.64	M. S. Abdul Khader	AIADMK	39.91
1984	Chepauk	DMK	Won	56.26	S. V. Marimuthu	AIADMK	42.31
1989	Park Town	DMK	Won	49.25	Babuji Gautam	AIADMK	22.50
1991	Park Town	DMK	Lost	37.79	U. Balaraman	INC	55.05
1996	Ramanathapuram	DMK	Won	51.22	S. K. G. Sekar	AIADMK	20.47
2001	Ramanathapuram	DMK	Lost	42.56	A. Anwar Rhazza	AIADMK	50.21
2006	Park Town	DMK	Lost	38.34	K. Srinivasan	AIADMK	47.06
