= Kalanidhi Veeraswamy =

Indian politician

Member of Parliament, Lok Sabha
- Incumbent
- Assumed office 23 May 2019
- Preceded by: T. G. Venkatesh Babu
- Constituency: Chennai North

Personal details
- Born: April 25, 1969 (age 56) Chennai, Tamil Nadu
- Party: Dravida Munnetra Kazhagam
- Spouse: Dr. Jeyanthi Kalanidhi
- Occupation: Politician

Kalanidhi Veeraswamy is an Indian politician. He was elected to the Lok Sabha, the lower house of the Parliament of India from Chennai North, Tamil Nadu in the 2019 Indian general election as member of the Dravida Munnetra Kazhagam. He is the son of Arcot N. Veeraswami, a former minister for electricity and health in the Indian state of Tamil Nadu. He is a medical doctor (a plastic surgeon) by profession.

== Elections contested ==
Elections	Constituency	Party	Result	Votes	% Vote's	Opposition		
Elections	Constituency	Party	Result	Votes	% Vote's	Candidate	Party	Vote %
General Elections, 2024	Chennai North	DMK	Won	4,97,333	55.09%	R. Manohar	ADMK	17.51%
General Elections, 2019	Chennai North	DMK	Won	5,90,986	61.82%	R. Mohanraj	DMDK	13.54%
