= G. Lakshmanan =

Indian politician

G Lakshmanan

Deputy Speaker of the Lok Sabha
- In office 1 December 1980 – 31 December 1984
- Speaker: Balram Jakhar
- Preceded by: Godey Murahari
- Succeeded by: M. Thambidurai

Member of Parliament, Lok Sabha
- In office 18 January 1980 – 31 December 1984
- Preceded by: A. V. P. Asaithambi
- Succeeded by: N. V. N. Somu
- Constituency: Chennai North

Member of Parliament, Rajya Sabha
- In office 1974–1980
- Constituency: Tamil Nadu

Personal details
- Born: 12 April 1924 Arantangi, Pudukkottai State, British India (now in Pudukkottai district, Tamil Nadu, India)
- Died: 10 January 2001 (aged 76) Chennai, Tamil Nadu, India
- Party: Dravida Munnetra Kazhagam
- Other political affiliations: Indian National Congress
- Spouse: Sulochana
- Children: 3
- Occupation: Politician

Govindaswamy Lakshmanan (12 February 1924 – 10 January 2001) was an Indian politician belonging to the Dravida Munnetra Kazhagam party. He was elected to the Lower house of the Indian Parliament the Lok Sabha in 1980 from Chennai North. He had earlier represented Tamil Nadu in the Rajya Sabha, the upper house of the Indian Parliament from 1974 to 1980. He was the Deputy Speaker of the Lok Sabha from 1980 to 1984.

He died on 10 January 2001.
