= C. Kuppusami =

Indian politician

Member of Parliament, Lok Sabha
- In office 10 March 1998 – 16 May 2009
- Preceded by: N. V. N. Somu
- Succeeded by: T. K. S. Elangovan
- Constituency: Chennai North

Personal details
- Born: 13 December 1926 Potharai, Tiruvannamalai, Madras Presidency, British India
- Died: 19 April 2013 (aged 86)
- Party: DMK
- Spouse: Smt. Andal
- Children: 1 son and 1 daughter

Chengalvarayan Kuppusami (13 December 1926 – 19 April 2013) was a member of the Lok Sabha of India from 1998 to 2009. He represented the Chennai North constituency of Tamil Nadu and was a member of the Dravida Munnetra Kazhagam (DMK) political party.

He was a trade unionist and the president of the labour wing of the DMK political party.
