= Kanimozhi N. V. N. Somu =

Indian politician

Kanimozhi NVN Somu

Member of Parliament, Rajya Sabha
- In office 27 September 2021 – 2 April 2026
- Constituency: Tamil Nadu

Personal details
- Born: 18 October 1973 (age 53) Chennai, Tamil Nadu
- Party: Dravida Munnetra Kazhagam
- Relations: N. V. Natarajan
- Parent: N. V. N. Somu (father)
- Education: Kilpauk Medical College, Sri Ramachandra Medical College and Research Institute
- Profession: Doctor

Dr. Kanimozhi N. V. Natarajan Somasundaram is an Indian politician. She was a Member of Parliament, representing Tamil Nadu in the Rajya Sabha the upper house of Indian Parliament as a member of the Dravida Munnetra Kazhagam. She is the State Medical Wing Secretary and spokesperson of the party. She is a Doctor, having done her MBBS at Kilpauk Medical College and Master of Surgery (Obstetrics & Gynaecology) from the Sri Ramachandra Medical College and Research Institute. She is the Founder and Chief Consultant of Thaaimai Hospital located at TTK ROAD, Alwarpet, Chennai and Thaaimai Fertility and Research Centre located at Gopalapuram, Chennai.
