= N. V. N. Somu =

Indian politician (1937–1997)

28th Union Minister of State for Defence
- In office 21 April 1997 – 14 November 1997
- Prime Minister: Inder Kumar Gujral
- Minister: Mulayam Singh Yadav
- Preceded by: Himself
- Succeeded by: Harin Pathak (1999-2000)
- In office 6 July 1996 – 21 April 1997
- Prime Minister: H. D. Deve Gowda
- Minister: Mulayam Singh Yadav
- Preceded by: Mallikarjun Goud (September 1995-May 1996)
- Succeeded by: Himself

Member of the Indian Parliament (Lok Sabha)
- In office 10 May 1996 – 14 November 1997
- Preceded by: D. Pandian
- Succeeded by: C. Kuppusami (1998-2009)
- Constituency: Chennai North
- In office December 1984 – November 1989
- Preceded by: G. Lakshmanan
- Succeeded by: D. Pandian
- Constituency: Chennai North

Member of Tamil Nadu Legislative Assembly
- In office 19 June 1980 – 15 November 1984
- Preceded by: T. S. Nallathambi
- Succeeded by: K. Anbazhagan
- Constituency: Park Town

Deputy Mayor of Madras
- In office 29 November 1971 – 1972
- Preceded by: To be ascertained
- Succeeded by: To be ascertained

Personal details
- Born: Natarajan Somasundaram; 11 May 1937 Gnayiru, Chingleput District, Madras Province, British India (now Tiruvallur district, Tamil Nadu, India)
- Died: 14 November 1997 (aged 60) Between Mago and Tawang, Arunachal Pradesh, India
- Cause of death: Helicopter crash
- Party: Dravida Munnetra Kazhagam (DMK)
- Spouse: Uma Devi
- Children: Thirumaran (son); Kanimozhi NVN Somu (daughter)
- Parents: Bhuvaneshwari (mother); N. V. Natarajan (father)
- Occupation: Politician, journalist, lawyer, trade unionist

Natarajan Somasundaram (11 May 1937 – 14 November 1997), popularly known as N. V. N. Somu, was a politician, journalist, lawyer, and trade unionist from Tamil Nadu, India. He was a veteran of the Dravida Munnetra Kazhagam (DMK).

Somu served as a councillor in the Madras Corporation (1968–73), Deputy Mayor of Madras (1971–72) Member of the Tamil Nadu Legislative Assembly from Park Town (1980–84), and Member of the Indian Parliament (Lok Sabha) from Chennai North (1984–89; 1996–97). In his second tenure as MP, he also served as Minister of State for Defence under two successive Prime Ministers - H. D. Deve Gowda and Inder Kumar Gujral. The later tenure was cut short by his death in a helicopter crash, when he was on an official tour of Arunachal Pradesh in November 1997.

Somu's daughter Kanimozhi NVN Somu is also a DMK MP, representing Tamil Nadu in the Rajya Sabha since 2021.

== Early life ==
He was born to a Mudaliar family on 11 May 1937 in Gnayiru (a suburb in present-day Tiruvallur district, Tamil Nadu) to Dravidian movement veterans Bhuvaneshwari and N. V. Natarajan. (Note: Natarajan initially supported the Indian National Congress (INC) before joining the Dravidian movement. He later served as the DMK's organisation secretary (1959-72), and Tamil Nadu's Minister of Labour and Backward Classes (1969-71) in the first Karunanidhi ministry.) In late 1938, at 18 months, Somu accompanied his mother to Vellore Central Prison, owing to the latter's participation in the Anti-Hindi agitation launched by 'Periyar' E. V. Ramasamy, then leader of the Justice Party and the Self-Respect Movement

== Career ==
Somu joined the Dravida Munnetra Kazhagam (DMK) (Note: At this point, the party was led by C. N. Annadurai.) during his student days. After training as a lawyer, he began his career as a reporter in the Tamil-language newspaper Dina Thanthi. During 1953-66, he was the sub-editor of Dravidan a Tamil weekly published by his father.

He also headed the DMK's legal wing for several years.

=== At the Madras Corporation (1968-73) ===
In 1968, he was elected as a DMK councillor (Kondiyampathi Division) to the Madras Corporation. The next year (1969), owing to his trade unionist credentials, he became the President of The Hindu Office and National Press Employees' Union.

On 29 November 1971, he defeated M. Bhaktavatsalam [of the Indian National Congress (O)] by 32 votes to become Deputy to Mayor Kamakshi Jayaraman. (Note: Kamakshi Jayaraman herself was elected Mayor earlier on the same day.) He remained in that position till 1972.

=== Member of Tamil Nadu Legislative Assembly (1980-84) ===
He was elected as Member of the Tamil Nadu Legislative Assembly (MLA) from Park Town constituency in 1980.

1980 Tamil Nadu Legislative Assembly election: Park Town
Party	Candidate	Votes	%	±%
DMK	N. V. N. Somu	38,095	55.94%	23.16%
GKC	S. Lalchand Daga	23,197	34.06%	
JP	A. Arumugha Naicker	6,556	9.63%	
Independent	Nahar Manakchand	146	0.21%	
Independent	C. Jagajothi Alias Govindarajulu	104	0.15%	
Margin of victory		14,898	21.88%	17.16%
Turnout		68,098	57.11%	9.58%
Registered electors		120,797		
DMK hold		Swing	23.16%	

=== Member of the Indian Parliament (Lok Sabha) (1984-89; 1996-97) ===
He was elected as a Member of the Indian Parliament (MP) from Chennai North Lok Sabha constituency twice - in 1984 and 1996.

1984 Indian general election: Chennai North
Party	Candidate	Votes	%	±%
DMK	N. V. N. Somu	261,941	52.20%	−5.13%
INC	G. Lakshmanan	2,25,491	44.93%	
Margin of victory		36,450	7.26%	−11.89%
Turnout		5,01,827	51.33%	−19.98%
Registered electors		9,91,099		34.08%
DMK hold		Swing	-5.13%	

1996 Indian general election: Chennai North
Party	Candidate	Votes	%	±%
DMK	N. V. N. Somu	559,048	66.11%	27.66%
INC	D. Pandian	1,69,431	20.04%	−34.58%
CPI(M)	W. R. Varada Rajan	66,479	7.86%	
BJP	Mohan V. Bharathamatha	19,113	2.26%	−0.10%
PMK	G. Mahadevan	16,143	1.91%	
Margin of victory		3,89,617	46.07%	29.91%
Turnout		8,45,640	55.85%	0.72%
Registered electors		15,53,112		14.31%
DMK gain from INC		Swing	11.50%	

=== Union Minister of State for Defence (1996-97) ===
Soon after being elected from the Chennai North constituency in 1996, Somu took oath as Union Minister of State (Defence) in the ministry under Prime Minister H. D. Deve Gowda on 6 July 1996. After Deve Gowda's resignation in April 1997, Somu was sworn in to the same portfolio in the succeeding ministry under Prime Minister Inder Kumar Gujral. In both these tenures, Somu was ministerial junior to Mulayam Singh Yadav.

== Death ==
=== Background ===
On 13 November 1997, Somu toured Arunachal Pradesh's areas bordering China as part of a two-day official visit to the northeastern States. The next day (November 14), he was scheduled to address the Indian Army's senior officials, including the General Officer Commanding-in-Chief (GoC) of the IV Corps at Tezpur, Assam. After that, he was intending to fly back to Chennai via Calcutta, West Bengal the same night. His subsequent plans included participation as chief guest in the National Library Week celebrations on 15 November, and to formally request Tamil Nadu's Chief Minister and DMK president M. Karunanidhi for a foreword for a proposed publication on N.V. Natarajan.

=== The crash ===
On November 14 morning, after a telephone conversation with his wife, Somu boarded a Cheetah helicopter stationed north of Mago village, Lungar Sector in Tawang district. He was accompanied by Major General Ramesh Chandra Nagpal (GoC of the Four Mountain Division). The helicopter (driven by pilot majors PK Agarwal and PC Sharma) took off at around 9:00 am IST. Shortly afterwards, at 9:10 am, radio contact with the helicopter was lost. Around 9:20 am, the helicopter crashed at a nearby remote area at an altitude of more than 4000 metres, killing all four occupants. (Note: The report carried by Business Standard claims that "A fifth victim of the tragedy, that occurred a little after 9 am at a spot one-and-a-half km from Tawang in Lungar sector was yet to be identified". However, all other sources identify only four victims.) Five army choppers, sent to rescue probable survivors, could only locate the wreckage with the bodies at 12:10 pm. Official sources said the crash was apparently caused due to poor visibility caused by mist in the early hours.

=== Condolences ===
- President K. R. Narayanan praised Somu as "a diligent and conscientious member of the council of ministers and an able parliamentarian", adding that his demise removed "a personality of prominence and great promise to the country".
- Prime Minister I. K. Gujral, on hearing the news, cancelled his scheduled two-day visit to Bombay, where he was to commission the warship INS Delhi (D61). (Note: The warship was commissioned as scheduled on 15 November.) He called Karunanidhi to convey his condolences to Somu's family. Praising Somu as "a warm and gentle person" in his condolence message, Gujral added “His views were always constructive and were expressed in the larger interest of the country. I shall miss his wise counsel in the Council of Ministers.”
- Defence Minister Mulayam Singh Yadav described Somu as an honest and upright minister whose untimely death was an irreparable loss to the DMK and the United Front government.
- Lok Sabha Speaker P. A. Sangma said that he had lost "a valued friend and parliamentary colleague" and that the country "a young administrator of considerable promise".
- Atal Behari Vajpayee (former PM) said "the tragic death of NVN Somu is a loss for which we will all grieve".
- The central secretariat of the Communist Party of India (CPI) expressed its "deep shock and sorrow" at Somu's death.
- Karunanidhi said that the service rendered by Somu “as the artery of the Dravidian movement" could not be forgotten. He added "[Somu] was the personification of love and compassion, a model of simplicity and he moved with everyone with brotherly affection. Death had suddenly engulfed such a kind-hearted person.

=== Funeral ===
Somu's body was taken to Tezpur for embalming. It was then taken to Madras and was laid in state at Somu's house in Purasawalkam. The funeral was attended by Gujral, his wife Sheila Gujral, Vajpayee, Mulayam Singh, G. K. Moopanar, and Karunanidhi. The chiefs of the three uniformed services were present, along with other senior officers and "thousands" of people. The body was cremated at Brick Kiln Road cremation ground, following last rites by Somu's son Thirumaran, and the army's 21-gun salute succeeded by reversed arms. After that, Army buglers sounded the Last Post.

=== Aftermath ===
An obituary reference to Somu was made in the Lok Sabha on 19 November by Sangma.

== Family ==
He was survived by his wife Uma Devi, son Thirumaran, and a daughter Kanimozhi NVN Somu - both doctors. Kanimozhi NVN Somu is a DMK MP in the Rajya Sabha, representing Tamil Nadu since September 2021.
