= T. K. S. Elangovan =

Indian politician

TKS Elangovan

Member of Parliament Rajya Sabha
- In office 30 June 2016 – 29 June 2022
- Constituency: Tamil Nadu

Member of Parliament
- In office 16 May 2009 — 16 May 2014
- Preceded by: C. Kuppusami
- Succeeded by: T. G. Venkatesh Babu
- Constituency: Chennai North

Personal details
- Born: 30 August 1954 (age 70); Thanjavur
- Political party: DMK
- Spouse: Nalini Elangovan
- Children: 2 daughters
- Occupation: Member of Parliament

T. K. S. Elangovan (born 30 August 1954 in Chennai, Tamil Nadu, India) is an Indian politician. He was elected to the Rajya Sabha, the upper house of Indian Parliament from Tamil Nadu as a member of the Dravida Munnetra Kazhagam. He was earlier elected to the Lok Sabha, the lower house of the Parliament of India from Chennai North. He is also the Organisation Secretary of DMK. He is the son of Late TK Srinivasan also popularly known as Thathuva Medhai TK Srinivasan (Ex Rajya Sabha MP).

== Political career ==
He was actively participating in politics since school days. He became the Organisation Secretary of DMK after quitting his job. He was elected Member of Parliament in May 2009.

In June 2016, he was announced as the party's candidate for the Rajya Sabha biennial polls. On 3 June 2016 he was elected unopposed along with R. S. Bharathi.

== Personal life ==
Elangovan belongs to DMK. His daughter Madhavi is married to actor John Vijay.
