= Kalanidhi Indira Sangeet Mahavidyalaya =

- Abbreviation: KISM
- Formation: 1963 A.D.
- Type: Non-Governmental Organization, Non-Profit Making
- Location: Pulchowk, Lalitpur, Nepal
- Services: Classical Vocal, Classical Dance, Classical Instruments Training
- Affiliations: Prayag Sangeet Samiti, Allahabad, India
- Website: http://www.kalanidhisangeet.org/

Kalanidhi Indira Sangeet Mahavidyalaya (Nepali: कलानिधि इन्दिरा संगीत महाविद्यालय) is an institution that teaches classical music in Nepal. It was established in 1963. This college is acknowledged and accredited by Bhat Khande Sangeet M.V. in Lucknow, India and by Prayag Sangeet Samiti in Allahabad India. Pandit Ranga Rao Kabambari was the first principal. Subsequent principals were Pt. Ganesh B. Bhandadri, Sangeet Pravin Nar Raj Dhakal, and Mohan Prasad Joshi.

It offers music courses including:

- Vocal
- Keyboard
- Guitar
- Israj
- Sarod
- Kathak Dance
- Sitar
- Charya Dance
- Violin
- Traditional Dance
- Tabala
- Folk Dance
