= T. G. Venkatesh Babu =

Indian politician

T.G. Venkatesh Babu

Member of the India Parliament for Chennai North
- In office 1 September 2014 – 23 May 2019
- Preceded by: T. K. S. Elangovan
- Constituency: Chennai North

Personal details
- Born: 15 December 1960 (age 65) Chennai, Tamil Nadu
- Party: All India Anna Dravida Munnetra Kazhagam
- Spouse: Smt. T. V. Manjula
- Children: 2
- Parent: T.Gangatharan Naidu
- Occupation: Businessperson
- As of 17 December, 2016

T. Gangatharan Venkatesh Babu (born 1961) is an Indian politician and Member of Parliament elected from Tamil Nadu. He is elected to the Lok Sabha from Chennai North constituency as an Anna Dravida Munnetra Kazhagam candidate in 2014 election.
