= M. S. Abdul Khader =

Indian politician

M. S. Abdul Khader (c. 1932 - 3 October 2009) was an Indian politician of the Dravida Munnetra Kazhagam (DMK) and later, Anna Dravida Munnetra Kazhagam. He served as mayor of Chennai and Member of Parliament.

== Political career ==
Khader was elected mayor in December 1959, when the DMK won a majority of seats in the Corporation of Chennai. In 1972, Khader was elected to the Rajya Sabha but resigned shortly afterwards to join the AIADMK.

== Death ==
Khader died on 3 October 2009 following a brief illness.
