= Thirukkuralar V. Munusamy =

- Born: V. Munusamy; 26 September 1913; Thogaippadi, Villupuram, Madras Presidency, British India
- Died: 4 January 1994 (aged 80); Madras, Tamil Nadu, India
- Occupations: Scholar, Politician
- Known for: Promoting the Tirukkural
- Spouse: Gyanambal
- Children: 8 (6 sons and 2 daughters)
- Parents: A. Veerasamy (father); Veerammal (mother)

Thirukkuralar Veerasamy Munusamy (Tamil - வீராசாமி முனுசாமி) (26 September 1913 – 4 January 1994), known by the public as Thirukkuralar V. Munusamy (Tamil - திருக்குறளார் வீ. முனுசாமி), was a Tamil Scholar and politician from Tamil Nadu, India. He is highly regarded for his work on promoting the Tamil classical work of the Tirukkural and his time as a member of Indian Parliament during 1952–1957.

== Early life ==
Munusamy was born on 26 September 1913 in the Thogaipadi village near Villupuram in British India to A. Veerasamy and Veerammal. He did his schooling at St. Soosaiyappar Higher Secondary School in Trichy. He earned his bachelor’s degree in economics at St. Soosaiyappar College and in law at Government Law College in Madras.

== Early career ==
At a young age, Munusamy displayed interest towards the Tirukkural and soon memorized all 1330 verses of the Kural literature. With the intention to take it to the common man, he conducted his first public discourse in 1935 at Nootrukkal Mantapam in the Malaikottai neighbourhood of Tiruchi. In 1941, Munusamy conducted the first ever Tirukkural conference in Salem, which was attended by scholars such as Devaneya Pavanar. While staying in Puraisaiwalkam during his college years, he conducted Tirukkural classes and also campaigns holding Kural placards with scholars such as A. K. Paranthamanar, Natesanar, and Vadivelanar. By 1943, he became a scholar in Tamil. Soon, he conducted a Kural conference in Madras, which saw the participation of such professors as R. P. Sethupillai, Subramania Pillai, and Rasakannanar.

== See also ==
- Tirukkural
