= Era. Anbarasu =

Indian politician (1940–2019)

Era Anbarasu
- Born: 20 October 1940
- Died: August 8, 2019 (aged 78)
- Occupation: politician

Era Anbarasu (20 October 1940 – 8 August 2019) was an Indian politician who served as Member of Parliament elected from Tamil Nadu. He was elected to the Lok Sabha as an Indian National Congress candidate from Central Chennai constituency in 1989 and 1991 elections. He was elected as an Indian National Congress (Indira) candidate from Chengalpattu constituency in 1980 election.

His son, D. Arul Anbarasu, was a member of Indian National Congress and the MLA for Sholinghur constituency.
