= Chennai Central Lok Sabha constituency =

Parliamentary constituency in Tamil Nadu, India

Coordinates: 13.036°N 80.239°E

Chennai Central
- Lok Sabha constituency
- Interactive map of Chennai Central Loksabha constituency, post-2008 delimitation

Constituency details
- Country: India
- Region: South India
- State: Tamil Nadu
- Assembly constituencies: Villivakkam; Egmore; Harbour; Chepauk-Thiruvallikeni; Thousand Lights; Anna Nagar
- Established: 1977
- Total electors: 14,65,323
- Reservation: None

Member of Parliament
- 18th Lok Sabha
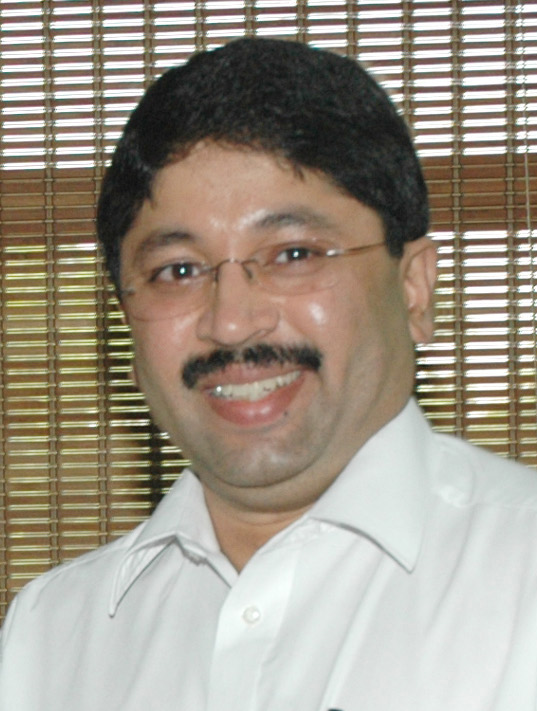
- Incumbent Dayanidhi Maran
- Party: DMK
- Alliance: None
- Elected year: 2024

The Lok Sabha constituency Chennai Central is one of three constituencies in Chennai, Tamil Nadu. Its Tamil Nadu Parliamentary Constituency number is 4 of 39. Formerly it was known as Madras Central.It is also one of the smallest constituencies in India. The Voter-verified paper audit trail (VVPAT) system with EVMs was used for the first time in this Lok Sabha constituency in 2014 elections.

== Assembly segments ==
=== 2009–present ===
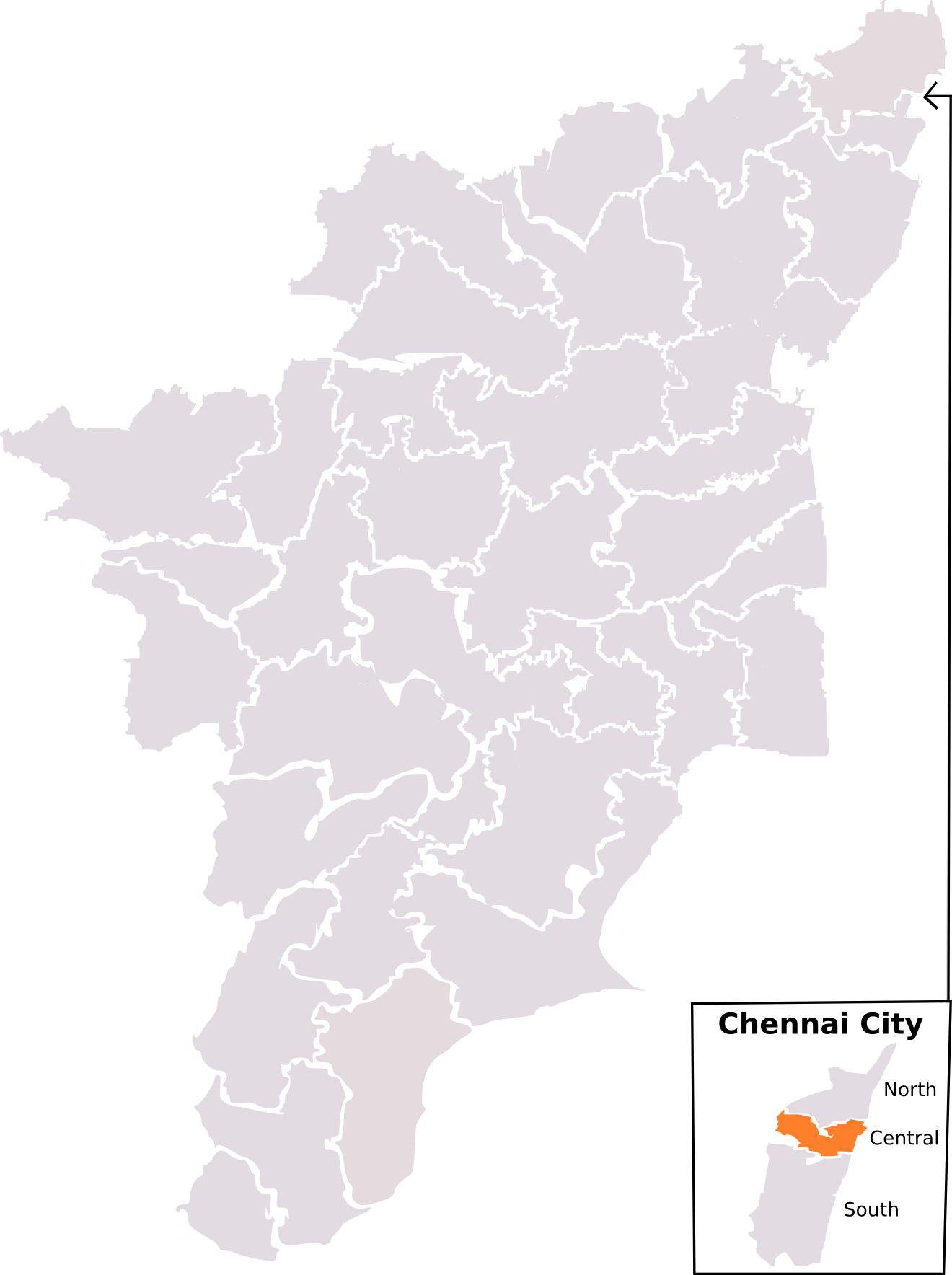
Chennai Central constituency as laid out by 2008 delimitation

Constituency number	Name	Reserved for (SC/ST/None)	District	Party	2024 Lead
14	Villivakkam	None	Chennai	TVK	DMK
16	Egmore	SC	Chennai	TVK	DMK
18	Harbour	None	Chennai	DMK	DMK
19	Chepauk-Triplicane	None	Chennai	DMK	DMK
20	Thousand Lights	None	Chennai	TVK	DMK
21	Anna Nagar	None	Chennai	TVK	DMK

=== Before 2009 ===
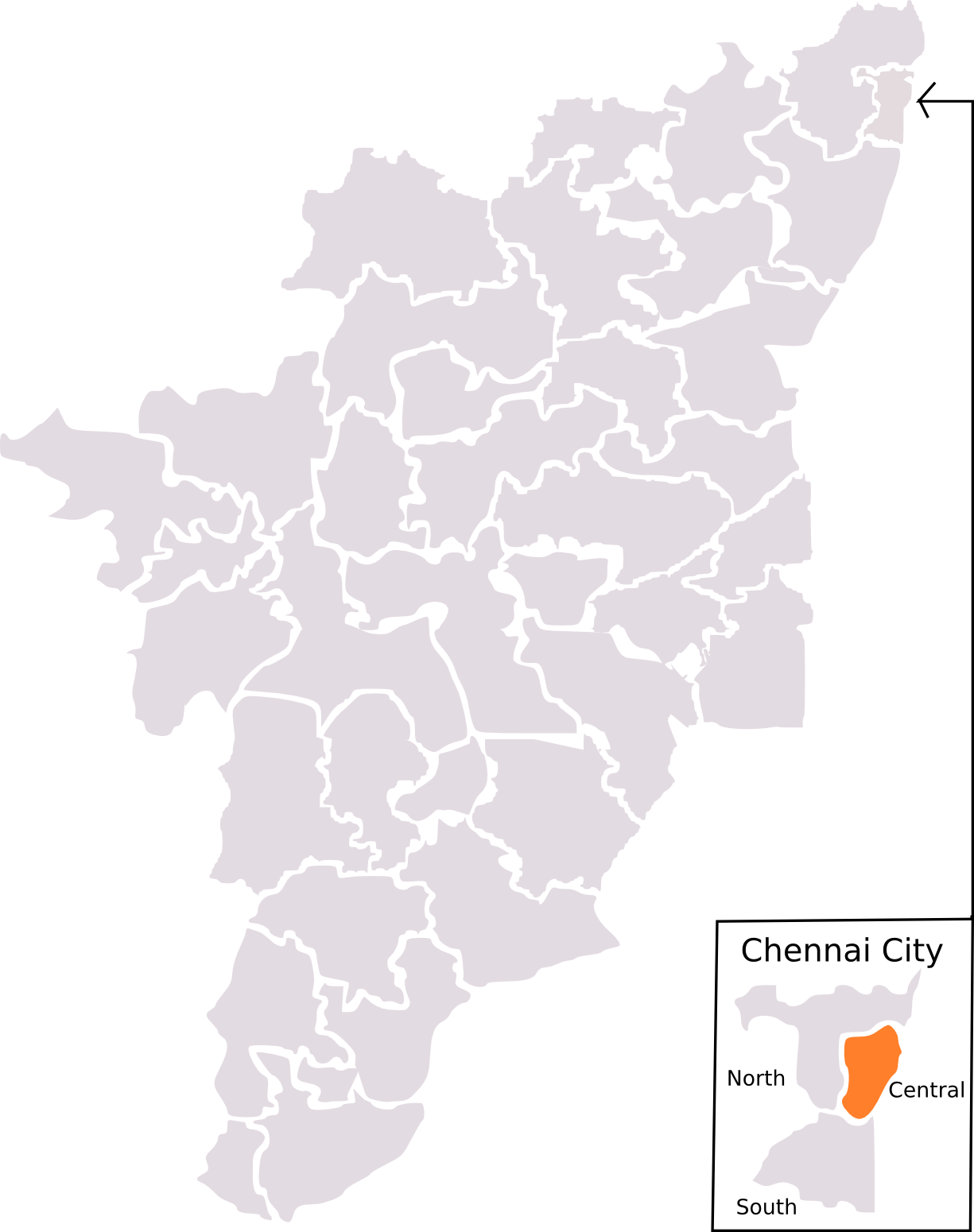
Chennai North constituency as laid out by 1971 Delimitation. The boundaries for this constituency lasted until 2004 election, which was then replaced by 2008 Delimitation.

Chennai Central Lok Sabha constituency is composed of the following assembly segments:

SI No.	Name
1.	Park Town (defunct)
2.	Purasawalkam (defunct)
3.	Egmore (SC)
4.	Anna Nagar
5.	Thousand Lights
6.	Chepauk (defunct)

== Members of the Parliament ==
Year	Winner	Party
1977	P. Ramachandran	Indian National Congress (O)
1980	A. Kalanithi	Dravida Munnetra Kazhagam
1984	A. Kalanithi	Dravida Munnetra Kazhagam
1989	Era. Anbarasu	Indian National Congress
1991	Era. Anbarasu	Indian National Congress
1996	Murasoli Maran	Dravida Munnetra Kazhagam
1998	Murasoli Maran	Dravida Munnetra Kazhagam
1999	Murasoli Maran	Dravida Munnetra Kazhagam
2004	Dayanidhi Maran	Dravida Munnetra Kazhagam
2009	Dayanidhi Maran	Dravida Munnetra Kazhagam
2014	S. R. Vijayakumar	All India Anna Dravida Munnetra Kazhagam
2019	Dayanidhi Maran	Dravida Munnetra Kazhagam
2024	Dayanidhi Maran	Dravida Munnetra Kazhagam

== Election results ==
Vote share of Winning candidates
2024	56.65%
2019	57.36%
2014	42.03%
2009	46.83%
2004	61.68%
1999	59.00%
1998	51.73%
1996	69.02%
1991	56.40%
1989	53.35%
1984	58.21%
1980	59.54%
1977	56.52%

=== General Elections 2024 ===
2024 Indian general election: Chennai Central
Party	Candidate	Votes	%	±%
DMK	Dayanidhi Maran	413,848	56.65	▼0.71
BJP	Vinoj P. Selvam	169,159	23.16	New
DMDK	Parthasarathy	72,016	9.86	New
NOTA	None of the above	11,163	1.53	▼0.24
Margin of victory		244,689	33.49	▼4.97
Turnout		730,549	53.96	▼4.79
Registered electors		13,50,161		
DMK hold		Swing	▼0.71	

=== General Elections 2019 ===
2019 Indian general election: Chennai Central
Party	Candidate	Votes	%	±%
DMK	Dayanidhi Maran	448,911	57.36	+21.10
PMK	S. R. Sam Paul	147,391	18.83	
MNM	Kameela Nasser	92,249	11.79	
SDPI	Sheik Mohamed	23,741	3.03	
NOTA	None Of The Above	13,822	1.77	−1.00
Margin of victory		3,01,520	38.52	32.74
Turnout		7,82,686	58.75	−0.96
DMK gain from AIADMK		Swing	15.32	

=== General Elections 2014 ===
2014 Indian general election: Chennai Central
Party	Candidate	Votes	%	±%
AIADMK	S. R. Vijayakumar	333,296	42.03	+0.69
DMK	Dayanidhi Maran	287,455	36.25	−10.58
DMDK	J. Constandine Ravindran	114,798	14.48	+8.09
INC	C. D. Meyyappan	25,981	3.28	
NOTA	None Of The Above	21,959	2.77	
AAP	J. Prabhakar	19,553	2.47	
Margin of victory		45,841	5.78	+0.30
Turnout		792,935	59.71	−1.28
Registered electors		13,28,038		+32.71
AIADMK gain from DMK		Swing	-4.80	

=== General Elections 2009 ===
2009 Indian general election: Chennai Central
Party	Candidate	Votes	%	±%
DMK	Dayanidhi Maran	285,783	46.83	−14.86
AIADMK	S. M. K. Mogamed Ali Jinnah	2,52,329	41.35	+5.83
DMDK	V. V. Ramakrishnan	38,959	6.38	
MNMK	S. Hyder Ali	13,160	2.16	
Margin of victory		33,454	5.48	−20.68
Turnout		10,00,705	60.98	+11.92
DMK hold		Swing	-14.86	

=== General Elections 2004 ===
2004 Indian general election: Chennai Central
Party	Candidate	Votes	%	±%
DMK	Dayanidhi Maran	316,329	61.68%	2.68%
AIADMK	N. Balaganga	1,82,151	35.52%	−1.32%
JP	G. Venkatesan	2,896	0.56%	
Margin of victory		1,34,178	26.16%	4.00%
Turnout		5,12,820	49.06%	0.60%
Rejected ballots		33	0.01%	
Registered electors		10,45,260		−18.02%
DMK hold		Swing	2.68%	

=== General Elections 1999 ===
1999 Indian general election: Chennai Central
Party	Candidate	Votes	%	±%
DMK	Murasoli Maran	364,565	59.00%	−10.02%
AIADMK	M. Abdul Lathief	2,27,616	36.84%	
PT	R. Janaki Ammal	5,046	0.82%	
Independent	V. G. Loganathan	3,815	0.62%	
Independent	S. Ranganathan	3,561	0.58%	
Independent	M. Dominic Savio	2,613	0.42%	
Margin of victory		1,36,949	22.16%	−25.77%
Turnout		6,17,900	48.46%	−9.22%
Registered electors		12,75,067		5.66%
DMK hold		Swing	-10.02%	

=== General Elections 1998 ===
1998 Indian general election: Chennai Central
Party	Candidate	Votes	%	±%
DMK	Murasoli Maran	300,774	51.73%	
AIADMK	D. Jayakumar	2,29,047	39.39%	
INC	R. Anbarasu	44,061	7.58%	
Margin of victory		71,727	12.34%	−35.59%
Turnout		5,81,449	49.50%	−8.19%
Registered electors		12,06,719		16.41%
DMK hold		Swing	-17.29%	

=== General Elections 1996 ===
1996 Indian general election: Chennai Central
Party	Candidate	Votes	%	±%
DMK	Murasoli Maran	403,867	69.02%	31.27%
INC	G. K. J. Bharathi	1,23,400	21.09%	−35.32%
MDMK	Prof. S. Krishnasamy	21,682	3.71%	
BJP	G. Kumaravelu	19,948	3.41%	−0.07%
PMK	D. Anbazhagan	7,654	1.31%	
Margin of victory		2,80,467	47.93%	29.28%
Turnout		5,85,149	57.69%	3.40%
Registered electors		10,36,649		0.23%
DMK gain from INC		Swing	12.61%	

=== General Elections 1991 ===
1991 Indian general election: Chennai Central
Party	Candidate	Votes	%	±%
INC	Era. Anbarasu	312,302	56.40%	3.05%
DMK	N. V. N. Somu	2,09,031	37.75%	−4.86%
BJP	B. Rajendra Kumar	19,262	3.48%	1.50%
PMK	D. Anbazhagan	7,472	1.35%	
Margin of victory		1,03,271	18.65%	7.91%
Turnout		5,53,679	54.28%	−6.47%
Registered electors		10,34,301		0.73%
INC hold		Swing	3.05%	

=== General Elections 1989 ===
1989 Indian general election: Chennai Central
Party	Candidate	Votes	%	±%
INC	Era. Anbarasu	329,739	53.35%	
DMK	A. Kalanidhi	2,63,333	42.61%	−15.61%
BJP	B. Rajendra Kumar	12,215	1.98%	
PMK	K. Raghunathan	4,454	0.72%	
Margin of victory		66,406	10.74%	−7.20%
Turnout		6,18,029	60.76%	−3.38%
Registered electors		10,26,829		18.99%
INC gain from DMK		Swing	-4.86%	

=== General Elections 1984 ===
1984 Indian general election: Chennai Central
Party	Candidate	Votes	%	±%
DMK	A. Kalanithi	313,848	58.21%	−1.32%
GKC	E. Earnest Paul	2,17,104	40.27%	
Independent	Bastimal Surana	2,595	0.48%	
Margin of victory		96,744	17.94%	−3.61%
Turnout		5,39,119	64.14%	−3.78%
Registered electors		8,62,989		18.71%
DMK hold		Swing	-1.32%	

=== General Elections 1980 ===
1980 Indian general election: Chennai Central
Party	Candidate	Votes	%	±%
DMK	A. Kalanidhi	290,199	59.54%	
JP	P. Ramachandran	1,85,150	37.99%	
INC(U)	P. Rajagopalan	6,172	1.27%	
Margin of victory		1,05,049	21.55%	5.56%
Turnout		4,87,409	67.93%	13.81%
Registered electors		7,26,953		−15.50%
DMK gain from INC(O)		Swing	3.02%	

=== General Elections 1977 ===
1977 Indian general election: Chennai Central
Party	Candidate	Votes	%	±%
INC(O)	P. Ramachandran	259,437	56.52%	
AIADMK	K. Raja Mohamed	1,86,026	40.52%	
Independent	V. N. Bajpai	7,013	1.53%	
Independent	Subramaniam Alias P. N. S. Mani	2,565	0.56%	
Independent	Abdul Gaffoor	2,092	0.46%	
Margin of victory		73,411	15.99%	
Turnout		4,59,054	54.12%	
Registered electors		8,60,316		
INC(O) win (new seat)				

== See also ==
- Chennai
- List of constituencies of the Lok Sabha
- Dravida Munnetra Kazhagam
- AIADMK
