= D. Pandian =

Indian politician (1932–2021)

D. Pandian தா. பாண்டியன்
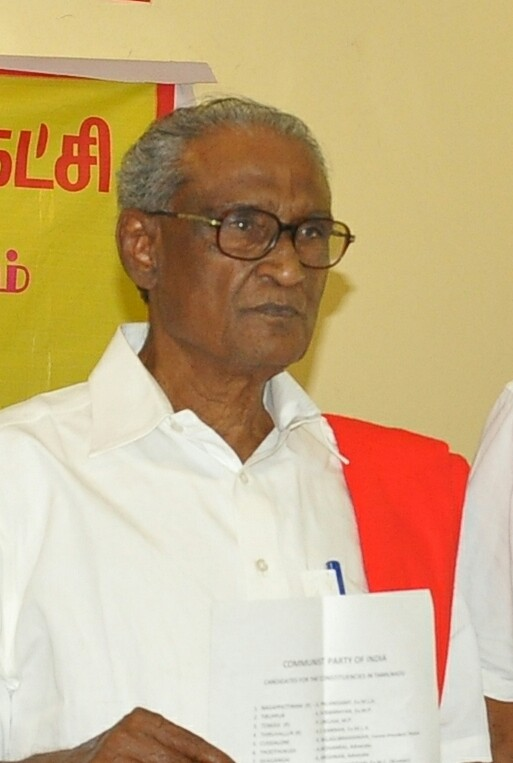

Secretary, CPI Tamil Nadu State Committee
- In office 15 April 2005 – 28 February 2015
- Preceded by: R. Nallakannu
- Succeeded by: R. Mutharasan

Personal details
- Born: David Pandian; 18 May 1932 Keelavellaimalaipatti, Usilampatti, Madras Presidency, British India
- Died: 26 February 2021 (aged 88) Chennai, Tamil Nadu, India
- Cause of death: Sepsis
- Party: Communist Party of India
- Other political affiliations: UCPI (1989-2000)
- Spouse: LillJoyce (m. 1956; died 2010)

David Pandian (18 May 1932 – 26 February 2021) was an Indian Tamil politician who served as Member of Parliament elected from Tamil Nadu. He was elected to the Lok Sabha as an Indian National Congress–United Communist Party of India (UCPI) candidate from North Chennai constituency in 1989 and 1991 elections. He was the Tamil Nadu State Secretary of the Communist Party of India for three consecutive terms from 2005 to 2015, when he was succeeded by R. Mutharasan.

== Early life ==
Pandian was born in Vellaimalaipatti, a village in Usilampatti Taluk, in modern day Madurai district on 23 September 1932. His father, David, and mother, Navamani, were teachers in a Christian missionary school aimed at children of the Piramalai Kallar community. He studied at the Kallar Reclamation School and later at the Usilampatti Board High School. He went on to complete to obtain a postgraduate degree in English from Alagappa college in Karaikudi. During this time, he also won the students' union elections as a member of the communist party's student wing. He held a Master of Arts and a Bachelor of Laws degree.

After completing his education, he served as a lecturer teaching English at the Alagappa Chettiar college in Karaikudi. He campaigned for the 1957 Tamil Nadu state assembly elections under a pseudonym. However, his name was published in some newspapers resulting in a demand for his resignation. However, the college's founder would encourage him further by presenting him with works of Karl Marx and Friedrich Engels.

== Career ==
Before becoming a full-time member of the Communist Party of India, he was the first general secretary of the Tamil Nadu Kalai Ilakkiya Perumandram (Tamil Nadu Art and Literary Federation) launched by communist party leader, P. Jeevanandam. He left the CPI to join the United Communist Party of India (UCPI) led by Mohit Sen and was elected to Lok Sabha from North Chennai. He returned to CPI in 2000 and became its State secretary in 2005. He was the president of Indian Railway Labour Union.

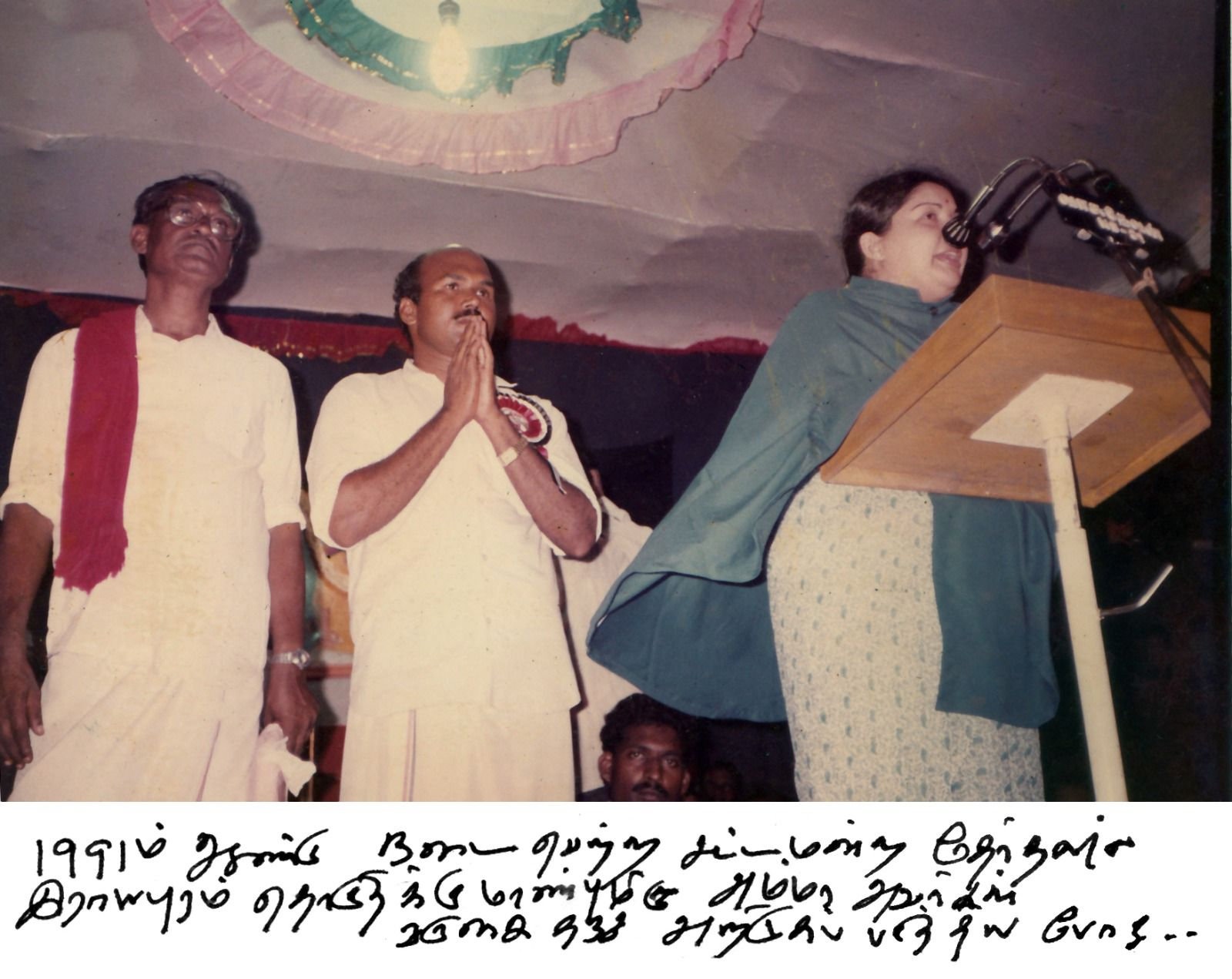
Pandian (left) at an election rally along with Jayalalithaa at Royapuram in 1991

On 21 May 1991, Pandian was seriously injured while accompanying the then Indian Prime Minister, Rajiv Gandhi, when the latter was assassinated in a suicide bomb attack. Pandian was scheduled to translate the prime minister's speech for the local audience. Though opposed to LTTE, he was a critic of the Sri Lankan government's approach to the issue of Sri Lankan Tamils and called for peaceful political solutions. Speaking later about the incident he would say that he still carried pieces of shrapnel in his body. He was also amongst the first victims to call for the release of the convicts in the Rajiv Gandhi assassination case, writing to the then Tamil Nadu Governor, Banwarilal Purohit, asking for their release on humanitarian grounds.

Pandian supported the construction of the Kudankulam Nuclear Power Plant. But his later statements indicated a change in his thinking and he has mentioned that exempting Russians from their liability was unacceptable. Some of the other causes advanced by Pandian during his career included speaking for social justice, eradication of superstitions, and promoting science education. He had also served as a trade union leader with the Railway and Port unions.

As an author, he had written over 30 books in Tamil and English, spanning topics across economics, social justice, philosophy, and history. His most recent book, Medai Pechhu (transl. Public speaking) was a retrospective on his political career and a narrative on the political history of Tamil Nadu. He was also the editor of Jana Sakthi, a Tamil daily run by CPI.

Pandian was a recipient of the Soviet Land Nehru Award.

== Personal life ==
Pandian had two daughters and a son, David Jawahar. His wife Joyce Pandian died at the age of 76 in 2010. His son David Jawahar is a former registrar of the University of Madras, Tamil Nadu, and was a professor at the Bharathidasan Institute of Management, Tiruchi.

Pandian died from sepsis at Rajiv Gandhi Government General Hospital in Chennai on 26 February 2021, at age 88.

== Published works ==
- Tolstoy: Story of a Lorry Driver
- State Monopoly and Economics
- Devaluation and What Happened in Czechoslovakia
- Medai Pechhu (transl. Public speaking)
