= P. Ramachandran =

Indian politician (1921–2001)

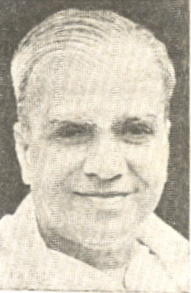

8th Governor of Kerala
- In office 27 October 1982 – 23 February 1988
- Chief Minister: K. Karunakaran; E. K. Nayanar
- Preceded by: Jothi Venkatachalam
- Succeeded by: Ram Dulari Sinha

8th Minister of Power
- In office 26 March 1977 – 28 July 1979
- Prime Minister: Morarji Desai
- Preceded by: K. C. Pant
- Succeeded by: K. C. Pant

Personal details
- Born: 11 July 1921
- Died: 23 May 2001 (aged 79) Tamil Nadu, India
- Party: Indian National Congress
- Children: 3, (One son & two daughters)

P. Ramachandran (11 July 1921 – 23 May 2001) was an Indian politician and Member of the Legislative Assembly. In parliament he represented Tamil Nadu. He was also Governor of Kerala (1982–1988).

In the assembly he was elected from Cheyyar Constituency in 1957 and from

Peranamallur constituency as an Indian National Congress candidate in 1962. He was later elected to Lok Sabha from Chennai Central constituency as a Janata Party candidate in 1977. He was also best friend of Sivaji Ganesan

== Tamil Nadu Congress Committee President ==
Ramachandran served as a President of Tamil Nadu Congress Committee.

== See also ==
- List of governors of Kerala
- Ministry of Power
