= Chepauk-Thiruvallikeni Assembly constituency =

Legislative constituency in Tamil Nadu, India

Chepauk-Thiruvallikeni
- Constituency No. 19 for the Tamil Nadu Legislative Assembly

Constituency details
- Country: India
- Region: South India
- State: Tamil Nadu
- District: Chennai
- Lok Sabha constituency: Chennai Central
- Established: 2008
- Total electors: 166,023
- Reservation: None

Member of Legislative Assembly
- 17th Tamil Nadu Legislative Assembly
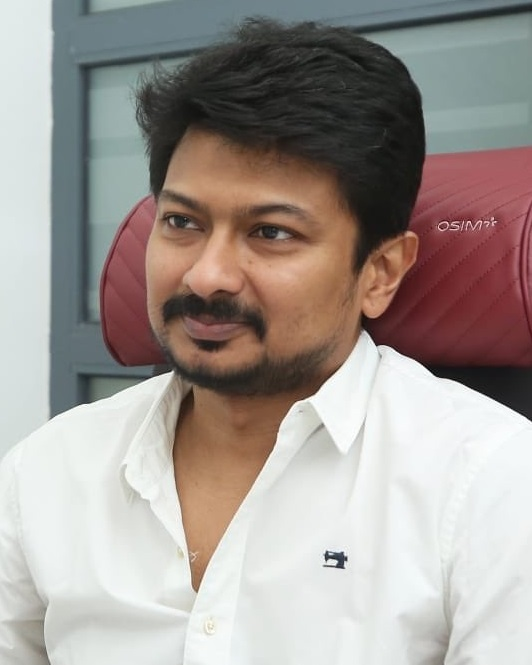
- Incumbent Udhayanidhi Stalin; Leader of the Opposition in the Tamil Nadu Legislative Assembly
- Party: DMK
- Alliance: SPA
- Elected year: 2026

Chepauk-Thiruvallikeni State Assembly constituency (Tamil: சேப்பாக்கம்-திருவல்லிக்கேணி சட்டமன்றத் தொகுதி) is one of the 234 state legislative assembly constituencies in Tamil Nadu in southern India. Its State Assembly Constituency number is 19. It is also one of the six state legislative assembly constituencies included in Chennai Central Lok Sabha constituency.

== Overview ==
As per orders of the Delimitation Commission, No. 19 Chepauk-Thiruvalikeni Assembly constituency is composed of Ward 79,81-93,95 & 111 of Greater Chennai Corporation

== Members of the Legislative Assembly ==
Election	Member	Party
2011	J. Anbazhagan	Dravida Munnetra Kazhagam
2016	J. Anbazhagan	Dravida Munnetra Kazhagam
2021	Udhayanidhi Stalin	Dravida Munnetra Kazhagam
2026	Udhayanidhi Stalin	Dravida Munnetra Kazhagam

== Election results ==
Vote share of winning candidates
2026	44.76%
2021	68.92%
2016	47.32%
2011	49.44%

=== Assembly election 2026 ===
2026 Tamil Nadu Legislative Assembly election : Chepauk-Thiruvallikeni
Party	Candidate	Votes	%	±%
DMK	Udhayanidhi Stalin	62,992	44.76	▼24.16
TVK	Selvam. D	55,852	39.68	New
AIADMK	Aadirajaram	16,507	11.73	New
NTK	Aysha	2,971	2.11	▼4.68
NOTA	None of the above	643	0.46	▼1.06
Margin of victory		7,140	5.07	▼46.17
Turnout		140,834	84.81	▲26.07
Total valid votes		140,741		
Registered electors		166,050		▼29.06
DMK hold		Swing		

=== Assembly election 2021 ===
2021 Tamil Nadu Legislative Assembly election : Chepauk-Thiruvallikeni
Party	Candidate	Votes	%	±%
DMK	Udhayanidhi Stalin	93,285	68.92	▲21.60
PMK	A. V. A. Kassali	23,930	17.68	▲15.93
NTK	S. M. Jayasimmaraja	9,193	6.79	▲5.53
IJK	K. Mohammed Idris	4,096	3.03	New
NOTA	None of the above	2,061	1.52	▼0.91
AMMK	L. Rajendran	1,873	1.38	New
Margin of victory		69,355	51.24	▲41.38
Turnout		137,483	58.74	▼3.56
Total valid votes		135,344		
Rejected ballots		78	0.06	▲0.06
Registered electors		234,067		▲1.50
DMK hold		Swing		

=== Assembly election 2016 ===
2016 Tamil Nadu Legislative Assembly election : Chepauk-Thiruvallikeni
Party	Candidate	Votes	%	±%
DMK	J. Anbazhagan	67,982	47.32	▼2.12
AIADMK	A. Noorjahan	53,818	37.46	New
BJP	A. P. N. Thamarai Gajendran	6,281	4.37	▲0.23
DMDK	V. Abdulla Sait	5,507	3.83	New
NOTA	None of the above	3,494	2.43	New
PMK	A. V. A. Kassali	2,511	1.75	New
NTK	P. Sivakumar	1,810	1.26	New
Margin of victory		14,164	9.86	▲2.77
Turnout		143,669	62.30	▼7.11
Total valid votes		143,665		
Rejected ballots		4	0.00	▼0.13
Registered electors		230,619		▲23.12
DMK hold		Swing		

=== Assembly election 2011 ===
2011 Tamil Nadu Legislative Assembly election : Chepauk-Thiruvallikeni
Party	Candidate	Votes	%	±%
DMK	J. Anbazhagan	64,191	49.44	New
MNMK	Thamimum Ansari	54,988	42.35	New
BJP	S. Venkataraman	5,374	4.14	New
INL	J. Abdul Rahim	1,271	0.98	New
BSP	C. Raghu	894	0.69	New
Independent	M. Sridharan	812	0.63	New
Margin of victory		9,203	7.09	
Turnout		130,009	69.41	
Total valid votes		129,836		
Rejected ballots		173	0.13	
Registered electors		187,305		
DMK win (new seat)				
