= Chennai North Lok Sabha constituency =

Parliamentary constituency in Tamil Nadu, India

Coordinates: 13.160°N 80.245°E

Chennai North
- Lok Sabha constituency
- Interactive map of Chennai North Loksabha constituency, post-2008 delimitation

Constituency details
- Country: India
- Region: South India
- State: Tamil Nadu
- Assembly constituencies: Thiruvottiyur; Dr. Radhakrishnan Nagar; Perambur; Kolathur; Thiru-Vi-Ka-Nagar; Royapuram
- Established: 1957–present
- Total electors: 16,87,461
- Reservation: None

Member of Parliament
- 18th Lok Sabha
- Incumbent Kalanidhi Veeraswamy
- Party: DMK
- Alliance: None
- Elected year: 2024

Chennai North is one of the three Lok Sabha constituencies in Chennai, Tamil Nadu. Its Tamil Nadu Parliamentary Constituency number is 2 of 39. Formerly it was known as Madras North.

== Assembly segments ==
=== After 2009 ===
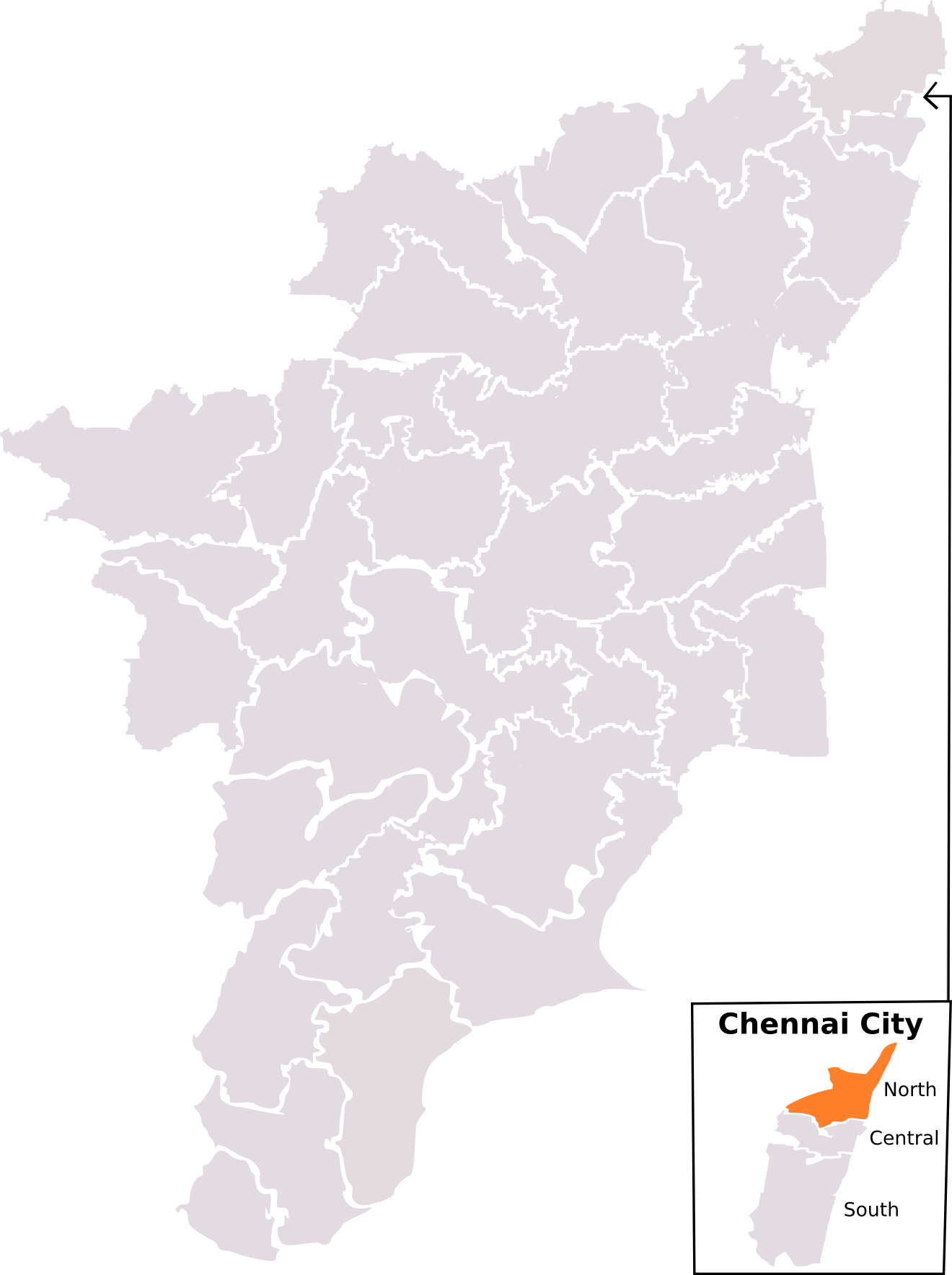
Chennai North constituency as laid out by 2008 delimitation

After delimitation, Chennai North consists of following constituencies

Constituency number	Name	Reserved for (SC/ST/None)	District	Party	2024 Lead
10	Thiruvottiyur	None	Chennai	TVK	DMK
11	Dr. Radhakrishnan Nagar	None	Chennai	TVK	DMK
12	Perambur	None	Chennai	TVK	DMK
13	Kolathur	None	Chennai	TVK	DMK
15	Thiru-Vi-Ka-Nagar	SC	Chennai	TVK	DMK
17	Royapuram	None	Chennai	TVK	DMK

=== 1971 Delimitation (1977-2009) ===
Chennai North Lok Sabha constituency is composed of the following assembly segments:

1. Royapuram
2. Harbour (moved to Chennai Central)
3. Villivakkam (moved to Chennai Central)
4. Perambur (SC)
5. Thiruvottiyur
6. Dr. Radhakrishnan Nagar

== Members of the Parliament ==
Year	Member	Party
1957	S. C. C. Anthony Pillai	Independent
1962	Dr P. Srinivasan	Indian National Congress
1967	Nanjil K. Manoharan	Dravida Munnetra Kazhagam
1971	Nanjil K. Manoharan	Dravida Munnetra Kazhagam
1977	A. V. P. Asaithambi	Dravida Munnetra Kazhagam
1980	G. Lakshmanan	Dravida Munnetra Kazhagam
1984	N. V. N. Somu	Dravida Munnetra Kazhagam
1989	D. Pandian	Indian National Congress
1991	D. Pandian	Indian National Congress
1996	N. V. N. Somu	Dravida Munnetra Kazhagam
1998	C. Kuppusami	Dravida Munnetra Kazhagam
1999	C. Kuppusami	Dravida Munnetra Kazhagam
2004	C. Kuppusami	Dravida Munnetra Kazhagam
2009	T. K. S. Elangovan	Dravida Munnetra Kazhagam
2014	T. G. Venkatesh Babu	All India Anna Dravida Munnetra Kazhagam
2019	Kalanidhi Veeraswamy	Dravida Munnetra Kazhagam
2024	Kalanidhi Veeraswamy	Dravida Munnetra Kazhagam

== Election results ==
Vote share of Winning candidates
2024	55.11%
2019	62.03%
2014	45.56%
2009	42.60%
2004	62.25%
1999	53.57%
1998	47.11%
1996	66.11%
1991	54.61%
1989	54.84%
1984	52.20%
1980	57.33%
1977	54.26%
1971	55.03%
1967	56.32%
1962	37.67%
1957	48.71%

=== General Elections 2024 ===
2024 Indian general election: Chennai North
Party	Candidate	Votes	%	±%
DMK	Kalanidhi Veeraswamy	497,333	55.11	▼6.92
AIADMK	R. Manohar	158,111	17.52	New
BJP	R. C. Paul Kanagaraj	113,318	12.56	New
NOTA	None of the Above	13,208	1.46	▼0.19
Margin of victory		339,222	37.49	▼10.95
Turnout		902,489	60.11	▼3.93
Registered electors		14,96,224		
DMK hold		Swing		

=== General Elections 2019 ===
2019 Indian general election: Chennai North
Party	Candidate	Votes	%	±%
DMK	Kalanidhi Veeraswamy	590,986	62.03	27.64
DMDK	R. Mohan Raj	1,29,468	13.59	3.84
MNM	A. G. Mourya	1,03,167	10.83	
Independent	P. Santhana Krishnan	33,277	3.49	
NOTA	None Of The Above	15,687	1.65	−0.31
Margin of victory		4,61,518	48.44	37.27
Turnout		9,52,770	64.04	1.29
Registered electors		14,87,681		4.59
DMK gain from AIADMK		Swing	16.47	

=== General Elections 2014 ===
2014 Indian general election: Chennai North
Party	Candidate	Votes	%	±%
AIADMK	T. G. Venkatesh Babu	406,704	45.56	
DMK	R. Girirajan	3,07,000	34.39	−8.20
DMDK	M. Soundarapandian	86,989	9.75	−0.31
INC	Biju Chacko	24,190	2.71	
CPI(M)	U. Vasuki	23,751	2.66	
NOTA	None Of The Above	17,472	1.96	
SDPI	M. Nijam Mohaideen	14,585	1.63	
AAP	S. Srinivason	6,819	0.76	
BSP	K. C. Pallanishamy	4,960	0.56	
Margin of victory		99,704	11.17	8.27
Turnout		8,92,642	62.76	−2.14
Registered electors		14,22,392		39.91
AIADMK gain from DMK		Swing	2.97	

=== General Elections 2009 ===
2009 Indian general election: Chennai North
Party	Candidate	Votes	%	±%
DMK	T. K. S. Elangovan	281,055	42.60	−19.65
CPI	D. Pandian	2,61,902	39.69	
DMDK	V. Yuvaraj	66,375	10.06	
BJP	Tamilisai Soundararajan	23,350	3.54	−31.03
Margin of victory		19,153	2.90	−24.78
Turnout		10,16,663	64.90	19.13
Rejected ballots		31	0.00	
Registered electors		6,59,820		−49.19
DMK hold		Swing	-19.65	

=== General Elections 2004 ===
2004 Indian general election: Chennai North
Party	Candidate	Votes	%	±%
DMK	C. Kuppusami	570,122	62.25	8.68
BJP	M. N. Sukumar Nambiar	3,16,583	34.57	
JD(U)	Muthu Gunasekaran	4,512	0.49	
Margin of victory		2,53,539	27.68	9.51
Turnout		9,15,865	45.77	1.98
Rejected ballots		6	0.00	
Registered electors		20,00,866		−1.98
DMK hold		Swing	8.68	

=== General Elections 1999 ===
1999 Indian general election: Chennai North
Party	Candidate	Votes	%	±%
DMK	C. Kuppusami	471,101	53.57	−12.54
CPI(M)	N. Soundararajan	3,11,312	35.40	27.54
TMC(M)	J. M. Aaroon Rashid	81,192	9.23	
Margin of victory		1,59,789	18.17	−27.90
Turnout		8,79,473	43.79	−12.06
Registered electors		20,41,341		8.53
DMK hold		Swing	-12.54	

=== General Elections 1998 ===
1998 Indian general election: Chennai North
Party	Candidate	Votes	%	±%
DMK	C. Kuppusami	401,322	47.11	
MDMK	R. T. Sabapathy Mohan	3,32,229	39.00	
CPI(M)	A. Soundara Rajan	50,590	5.94	
INC	G. K. J. Bharathi	47,147	5.53	
BSP	T. Devanathan	12,085	1.42	
CPI(ML)L	S. Kumarasamy	4,100	0.48	
Margin of victory		69,093	8.11	−37.96
Turnout		8,51,847	46.58	−9.27
Registered electors		18,80,857		21.10
DMK hold		Swing	-19.00	

=== General Elections 1996 ===
1996 Indian general election: Chennai North
Party	Candidate	Votes	%	±%
DMK	N. V. N. Somu	559,048	66.11	27.66
INC	D. Pandian	1,69,431	20.04	−34.58
CPI(M)	W. R. Varada Rajan	66,479	7.86	
BJP	Mohan V. Bharathamatha	19,113	2.26	−0.10
PMK	G. Mahadevan	16,143	1.91	
Margin of victory		3,89,617	46.07	29.91
Turnout		8,45,640	55.85	0.72
Registered electors		15,53,112		14.31
DMK gain from INC		Swing	11.50	

=== General Elections 1991 ===
1991 Indian general election: Chennai North
Party	Candidate	Votes	%	±%
INC	D. Pandian	400,454	54.61	−0.23
DMK	Aladi Aruna	2,81,936	38.45	−2.38
PMK	Rama Muthukumar	18,856	2.57	
BJP	G. Krishnan	17,309	2.36	
Doordarshi Party	M. Kalidass	3,646	0.50	
JP	T. Vellaiyan	3,557	0.49	
Margin of victory		1,18,518	16.16	2.15
Turnout		7,33,279	55.13	−5.78
Registered electors		13,58,695		1.01
INC hold		Swing	-0.23	

=== General Elections 1989 ===
1989 Indian general election: Chennai North
Party	Candidate	Votes	%	±%
INC	D. Pandian	445,197	54.84	9.91
DMK	N. V. N. Somu	3,31,426	40.83	−11.37
PMK	Rama Muthukumar	21,537	2.65	
Margin of victory		1,13,771	14.02	6.75
Turnout		8,11,761	60.91	9.58
Registered electors		13,45,150		35.72
INC gain from DMK		Swing	2.65	

=== General Elections 1984 ===
1984 Indian general election: Chennai North
Party	Candidate	Votes	%	±%
DMK	N. V. N. Somu	261,941	52.20	−5.13
INC	G. Lakshmanan	2,25,491	44.93	
Margin of victory		36,450	7.26	−11.89
Turnout		5,01,827	51.33	−19.98
Registered electors		9,91,099		34.08
DMK hold		Swing	-5.13	

=== General Elections 1980 ===
1980 Indian general election: Chennai North
Party	Candidate	Votes	%	±%
DMK	G. Lakshmanan	297,268	57.33	3.07
AIADMK	M. S. Abdul Khader	1,97,950	38.18	−6.33
Independent	R. Indra Kumari	16,378	3.16	
Margin of victory		99,318	19.15	9.40
Turnout		5,18,531	71.31	16.15
Registered electors		7,39,196		−13.30
DMK hold		Swing	3.07	

=== General Elections 1977 ===
1977 Indian general election: Chennai North
Party	Candidate	Votes	%	±%
DMK	A. V. P. Asaithambi	250,852	54.26	−0.77
AIADMK	Nanjil K. Manoharan	2,05,749	44.51	
Margin of victory		45,103	9.76	−1.81
Turnout		4,62,301	55.16	−10.91
Registered electors		8,52,627		23.22
DMK hold		Swing	-0.77	

=== General Elections 1971 ===
1971 Indian general election: Chennai North
Party	Candidate	Votes	%	±%
DMK	Nanjil K. Manoharan	245,401	55.03	−1.29
INC(O)	S. G. Vinayagamoorthy	1,93,807	43.46	2.30
Independent	Zainuddin	3,452	0.77	
Independent	Virandra Nath Bajpai	3,294	0.74	
Margin of victory		51,594	11.57	−3.60
Turnout		4,45,954	66.07	−8.78
Registered electors		6,91,938		25.74
DMK hold		Swing	-1.29	

=== General Elections 1967 ===
1967 Indian general election: Chennai North
Party	Candidate	Votes	%	±%
DMK	Nanjil K. Manoharan	227,783	56.32	
INC	S. C. C. Anthony Pillai	1,66,449	41.15	3.48
Independent	P. M. Lingesan	10,220	2.53	
Margin of victory		61,334	15.16	12.44
Turnout		4,04,452	74.84	1.11
Registered electors		5,50,302		21.57
DMK gain from INC		Swing	18.65	

=== General Elections 1962 ===
1962 Indian general election: Chennai North
Party	Candidate	Votes	%	±%
INC	P. Seenivasan	122,160	37.67	−5.39
IUML	A. K. A. Abdul Samad	1,13,311	34.94	
Tamilnad Socialist Labour Party	S. C. C. Anthony Pillai	80,227	24.74	
Independent	Rajamannar	5,508	1.70	
Independent	R. Ramanathan	3,079	0.95	
Margin of victory		8,849	2.73	−2.93
Turnout		3,24,285	73.73	34.43
Registered electors		4,52,645		0.59
INC gain from Independent		Swing	-11.04	

=== General Elections 1957 ===
1957 Indian general election: Chennai North
Party	Candidate	Votes	%	±%
Independent	S. C. C. Anthony Pillai	86,139	48.71	
INC	T. Chengalvarayan	76,141	43.06	
PSP	G. Rajamannar Chattair	14,555	8.23	
Margin of victory		9,998	5.65	
Turnout		1,76,835	39.30	
Registered electors		4,49,968		
Independent win (new seat)				

== See also ==
- Chennai
- List of constituencies of the Lok Sabha
