= A. V. P. Asaithambi =

Indian politician

Member of the Madras State Assembly
- In office 1957–1962
- Preceded by: K. Venkatasamy Naidu
- Constituency: Thousand Lights
- In office 1967–1972
- Preceded by: J. Vencatachellum
- Constituency: Egmore

Personal details
- Born: 24 September 1924; Virudhunagar, Madras Presidency, British India (now Tamil Nadu, India)
- Died: 7 April 1979 (aged 54); Rangat, Andaman & Nicobar Islands, India

A. V. P. Asaithambi (24 September 1924 – 7 April 1979) was a Tamil Nadu politician, belonging to DMK party. He was elected to the Tamil Nadu Legislative Assembly in 1957 from Thousand Lights constituency as a Dravida Munnetra Kazhagam party candidate and 1967 from Egmore constituency as a Dravida Munnetra Kazhagam candidate. He was also elected to Lok Sabha in 1977 from Chennai North constituency as a Dravida Munnetra Kazhagam candidate. Collectrate office building in Virudhunagar is named after him. He was a dialogue writer for a film Sarvadhikari made in 1951. He died on 7 April 1979.
