= R. V. Swaminathan =

Indian politician (1908–1984)

Minister of State for Rural Development
- In office 24 November 1980 – 29 January 1983
- Prime Minister: Indira Gandhi
- Minister: Rao Birender Singh

Minister of State for Agriculture
- In office 14 January 1980 – 29 January 1983
- Prime Minister: Indira Gandhi
- Minister: Rao Birender Singh

Member of Parliament, Lok Sabha
- In office 1980–1984
- Preceded by: Periasamy Thiagarajan
- Succeeded by: P. Chidambaram
- Constituency: Sivaganga
- In office 1977 - 1979; 1971 - 1977
- Preceded by: P. Ramamurthi
- Succeeded by: A. G. Subburaman
- Constituency: Madurai

Member of the Madras State Assembly
- In office 1962–1967
- Preceded by: D. Subramaniya Rajkumar
- Succeeded by: S. Sethuraman
- Constituency: Sivaganga
- In office 1952–1957
- Succeeded by: D. Subramaniya Rajkumar
- Constituency: Sivaganga

Personal details
- Born: 5 August 1908
- Died: 4 October 1984 (aged 76)
- Party: Indian National Congress

R. V. Swaminathan (5 August 1908 – 4 October 1984) was an Indian politician, freedom fighter, and Union Minister. He was a Member of the Legislative Assembly of Tamil Nadu and represented the state in the Lok Sabha as a Member of Parliament.

Swaminathan was born on 5 August 1908. He began his political journey as a freedom fighter during India's struggle for independence.

Swaminathan was elected to the Tamil Nadu legislative assembly (then Madras State Assembly) from the Sivaganga constituency in 1952 and again in 1962 as a candidate of the Indian National Congress.

In 1963, following K. Kamaraj's resignation as Chief Minister, Swaminathan entered a leadership contest against M. Bhaktavatsalam. Swaminathan stated that his candidacy was intended to "break the monotony of unanimous elections". Bhaktavatsalam, however, secured victory with 128 votes to Swaminathan's 22.

During the split in the Indian National Congress in 1969, Swaminathan sided with the faction led by Indira Gandhi.

He was elected to the Lok Sabha from Madurai constituency as an Indian National Congress candidate in 1971. He was re-elected from Madurai in 1977. In 1980, he was re-elected to the Lok Sabha from the Sivaganga constituency and was appointed Minister of State for Agriculture and Rural Development.

Swaminathan died on 4 October 1984.
