= Peravai =

Peravai may refer to:

- Aathi Thamilar Peravai, people's movement founded by Adhiyamaan in 1994 in Tamil Nadu, India
- Congress Jananayaka Peravai (Congress Democratic Front), formerly Dhamaka Jannanayaka Peravai political party in the Indian state of Tamil Nadu
- Dravida Peravai (Dravidian Front), political party in Pondicherry, India
- Kumari Arivial Peravai, voluntary group doing service in the field of science and technology in Kanyakumari district, India
