= INX Media case =

Criminal investigation in India

The INX Media case refers to an ongoing high-profile money laundering investigation in India. It involves allegation of irregularities in foreign exchange clearances given to INX Media group for receiving overseas investment in 2007. P. Chidambaram was union finance minister at the time. His son Karti Chidambaram has been implicated by the investigating agencies.

As of September 2019, there were no reports of charges filed against P. Chidambaram. The CBI is reported to be conducting a probe. Chidambaram was given bail on 4 December 2019 after 105 days of custody in Tihar Jail.

== Background ==
INX Media, founded by media entrepreneurs Indrani Mukerjea along with husband Peter Mukerjea, allegedly violated foreign investment laws. INX Media had permission to source foreign investments to the tune of ₹4.62 crore (US$480,000) but it has allegedly received funds worth ₹305 crore (US$32 million).

In March 2007, INX Media had approached the Chairman of Foreign Investment Promotion Board (FIPB), for permission for foreign direct investment (FDI) from three non-resident investors based in Mauritius. (Note: INX Media application sought to issue 14.98 lakh equity shares and 31.22 lakh convertible non-cumulative redeemable preference shares to the non-resident investors.) This money was sought for creating and operating a number of television channels under the banner of INX Media. The application to the FIPB mentioned its intention to "make a downstream financial investment to the extent of 26 per cent of the issued and outstanding equity share capital of INX News Private Limited".

The FIPB approved the proposal for FDI inflow which should not go beyond 46.20 percent of shareholding in INX media, but did not approve the downstream investment. However, according to the CBI, the company "deliberately and in violations of the conditions and approval", carried out the downstream investment. Moreover, it generated FDI exceeding Rs. 305 crore "by issuing shares to foreign investors at a premium of more than Rs 800 per share".

When the Income Tax Department sought clarifications on the matter in February 2008, INX Media allegedly sought to evade the investigation by approaching Karti Chidambaram to leverage his family name. The CBI alleged that Karti Chidambaram received kickbacks to the tune of ₹10 lakh (US$10,000) for his assistance, via his consulting firm Advantage Strategic Consulting Ltd.

In 2009, Peter and Indrani Mukerjea exited INX Media by selling their 30% share in the company, which was making losses by this time. The company was subsequently renamed 9X Media.

== Investigations ==
=== 2010–2015 ===
In 2010, the Enforcement Directorate, a financial crime fighting agency, registered a case under Foreign Exchange Management Act (FEMA) for diverting foreign direct investment by three Mauritius-based companies in INX Media to its subsidiaries without prior approval of the FIPB. The three companies named were New Vernon Private Equity Limited, New Silk Route (NSR) PE Mauritius, and Dunearn Investment (Mauritius). In 2013 the investigation was halted without explanation. In May 2014 the investigative wing of the Central Board of Direct Taxes compiled a tax history of the INX Group and suggested that the Mukerjeas had laundered Rs. 275.5 crore (Rs. 2.755 billion) via Mauritius into eight INX Group subsidiary companies between 2007 and 2008. In September 2015 the Mumbai office of the Enforcement Directorate indicated that it would reopen the 2010 FEMA case under the Prevention of Money Laundering Act, 2002.

=== 2017 ===
On 15 May 2017, the Enforcement Directorate filed a case against Karti Chidambaram, INX Media and its former directors, Peter Mukerjea and Indrani Mukerjea, and a few others for money laundering.

In June 2017, The Foreigner Regional Registration Officer and the Bureau of Immigration, which comes under the Union Home Ministry, issued a look out circular (LOC) against Karti Chidambaram. On 10 August 2017, Madras High Court stayed the LOCs issued against Karti Chidambaram and four others but it was stayed by Supreme Court of India on 14 August 2017. In October 2017, P Chidambaram conveyed to the Supreme Court of India that the case is a "politically-motivated vendetta" against him and his son.

=== 2018 ===
Karti Chidambaram's chartered accountant, S. Bhaskararaman, was arrested for allegedly assisting him to manage his wealth in India and abroad in February 2018. In the same month, Karti Chidambaram was arrested by CBI at Chennai airport and was brought to Delhi. He received bail after spending 23 days in jail.

In March 2018, Indrani Mukerjea told the CBI in a statement that a $1-million deal had been struck between Karti Chidambaram and the Mukerjeas to secure FIPB approval in favour of INX Media. In October 2018, the Enforcement Directorate (ED) seized assets of Karti Chidambaram worth Rs 54 crore, including properties in New Delhi, Ooty, United Kingdom and Barcelona in relation to the INX Media case.

=== 2019 ===
In August 2019, the CBI and ED issued a notice to appear before them. On 21 August, it was reported that P. Chidambaram went missing after his anticipatory bail plea was refused on same day. He appeared around 24 hours later at the Congress Party headquarters and made a statement to the press that he has "not committed any offence in INX Media case" and "will respect the law". His plea for an anticipatory bail in INX Media case was dismissed by the Delhi High Court on 20 August 2019.

The CBI arrested him at his house the next day, in a sequence of events described as "dramatic" by the media. After being denied entry at the main gate of his house, some CBI agents reportedly entered the compound through the back gate and others by "scaling the walls". Eventually they were allowed into the house and the arrest was carried out.

On 5 September 2019, P. Chidambaram was sent to Tihar Jail for a two-week judicial custody and on 3 October 2019, he was again sent to jail up to 17 October after his bail was rejected.

On 22 October 2019, Supreme Court granted bail to P Chidambaram against the case registered by the CBI. However, he was not released because by the time he was given bail, the ED had arrested him for further investigation in the case. Chidambaram was given bail on 4 December 2019, after 105 days of custody in Tihar Jail. The Supreme Court has barred him from speaking to the press.
