= V. Chandran =

Indian politician (born 1954)

Member of the Tamil Nadu Legislative Assembly
- In office 2001–2006
- Preceded by: Tha. Kiruttinan
- Succeeded by: S. Gunasekaran
- Constituency: Sivaganga

Personal details
- Born: 7 August 1954 Sivaganga
- Party: All India Anna Dravida Munnetra Kazhagam
- Profession: Farmer

V. Chandran is an Indian politician and a former member of the Tamil Nadu Legislative Assembly. He hails from Sivaganga town in the Sivaganga district. Chandran, who studied up to the 10th standard in Sivaganga, belongs to the All India Anna Dravida Munnetra Kazhagam (AIADMK). He contested and won the Sivaganga assembly constituency in the 2001 Tamil Nadu Legislative Assembly election, becoming a Member of the Legislative Assembly.

== Electoral performance ==
=== 2001 ===
2001 Tamil Nadu Legislative Assembly election: Sivaganga
Party	Candidate	Votes	%	±%
AIADMK	V. Chandran	51,708	48.68%	+19.09
DMK	Pasumpon Tha. Krishnan	47,435	44.65%	−15.99
MDMK	N. Jeyaraman	3,149	2.96%	−3.93
Independent	J. K. Joseph	2,430	2.29%	New
Independent	M. Naina Mohammed	670	0.63%	New
Margin of victory		4,273	4.02%	−27.04%
Turnout		106,230	57.80%	−5.72%
Registered electors		183,912		
AIADMK gain from DMK		Swing	-11.97%	
