= Karti Chidambaram =

Indian politician (born 1971)

Member of Parliament, Lok Sabha
- Incumbent
- Assumed office 23 May 2019
- Preceded by: P. R. Senthilnathan
- Constituency: Sivaganga

Personal details
- Born: 16 November 1971 (age 54) Madras, Tamil Nadu, India
- Party: Indian National Congress
- Spouse: Srinidhi Chidambaram
- Children: 1
- Parents: P. Chidambaram (father); Nalini Chidambaram (mother)
- Education: University of Texas at Austin (BBA); Wolfson College, Cambridge (LLB)
- Occupation: Politician, businessman, lawyer

Karti Chidambaram (born 16 November 1971) is an Indian politician, businessman and lawyer. A member of the Indian National Congress, he serves as the Member of Parliament for Sivaganga in the Lok Sabha. He was elected in the 2019 Indian general election and 2024 Indian general election, winning the seat held seven times by his father, P. Chidambaram.

== Early life and education ==
Karti Chidambaram's was born to Nalini Chidambaram and P Chidambaram in Chennai, Tamil Nadu.

Karti did his schooling at Don Bosco School, Chennai. He earned a Bachelor of Business Administration from the McCombs School of Business at University of Texas at Austin in 1993. He later earned Bachelor of Laws from Wolfson College at University of Cambridge in 1995.

== Political career ==
After his education, he returned to Tamil Nadu where a political upheaval had taken place. P Chidambaram had left the Congress and formed his own political party called the Congress Jananayaka Peravai. Karti Chidambaram became a member of party and served as P Chidambaram's election manager in Sivaganga. Chidambaram unsuccessfully ran in the 2014 Indian General Election for the Sivaganga seat, losing to P. R. Senthilnathan of the All India Anna Dravida Munnetra Kazhagam. He ran for the seat again in the 2019 Indian general election, and won.

== Personal life ==
Karti Chidambaram is married to Srinidhi Rangarajan, a Bharathanatyam dancer and physician who works with the Apollo Hospitals Group in Chennai. They have a daughter, Aditi Nalini Chidambaram. On 3 August 2020, Chidambaram tested positive for COVID-19.

== Other activities and memberships ==
Karti Chidambaram has been associated with tennis for over three decades. He is the Secretary-General of the Indian Tennis Players Association (ITPA). He has held the position of Chairman of the Organising Committee for Chennai Open and was a former vice-president of the All India Tennis Association. He is currently the vice-president for the Tamil Nadu Tennis Association.

He is also the President of the Tenpin Bowling Federation of India and Chief Patron of the All India Karate-Do Federation. He is a member of the inaugural class of the India Leadership Initiative (ILI) of the Aspen Institute, Chairman of the Asia 21 India Chapter of The Asia Society, co-founder of the Chennai Chapter of Young Entrepreneurs Organisation, and co-founder of www.karuthu.com (an "Online Public Opinion Forum").

Karti Chidambaram founded the platform G67.

== Lawsuits ==
Chidambaram is alleged to be involved in Aircel-Maxis and Sequoia Capital case. The CBI investigated the role of former finance minister P Chidambaram in the takeover of telecom operator Aircel by Maxis. The investigating body found out that the finance minister and ministry's secretary were to clear an investment of up to Rs 6 billion. Maxis' investment in Aircel at the time was Rs. 30 billion. Thus, the ministry and FIPB had the legal hand to clear the investment.

In April 2015, the Enforcement Directorate (ED) searched the Bengaluru offices of Sequoia Capital India, the Indian subdivision of a Mauritius-based investment fund, in connection with a probe of Vasan Healthcare Group, which was partly owned by Karti Chidambaram. Sequoia was suspected of abusing India's foreign direct investment policy.

It was reported on 25 August 2015, that the ED had summoned two directors of Advantage, Vishwanath Ravi and C.B.N. Reddy, for questioning in Delhi under the Prevention of Money Laundering Act. They were interrogated in connection with the Aircel-Maxis case, a corruption scandal that had begun with a 2011 complaint by the owner of Aircel, a communications firm, who said he had been pressured to sell his stake in his company to Maxis, a data firm. The ED said it would later be summoning Karti Chidambaram himself in connection with the case.

In a series of articles published in September and October 2015, the New Indian Express charged that Karti Chidambaram was the secret owner, or perhaps co-owner with his father, of a sprawling international network of companies. On 17 September 2015, the newspaper reported that Advantage had bought shares of Vasan Eye Care at a reduced price and had later sold the shares at a huge profit. Karti Chidambaram's name was mentioned in connection with these transactions. On 21 September, Karti Chidambaram's father denied any association between anyone in his family and Vasan and threatened to sue the newspaper. On 23 October, the Express produced a tax affidavit supporting its claims. In February 2017, Judge OP Saini quashed the Aircel-Maxis case. Special Judge O P Saini said the court has "no hesitation in recording no prima facie case warranting" framing of charges against any of the accused in Aircel Maxis case.

On 1 December 2015, the Income Tax Department and ED raided Vasan's and Chidambaram's offices. The next day, Karti Chidambaram's father said, "We have made it clear, repeatedly, that no member of my family has any equity or economic interest in any of the firms that are being targeted.…I condemn the attempt to link them to my son and harass them on that ground. If the government wants to target me, it should do so directly. My family and I are quite prepared to face the ‘malicious onslaught’ launched by government." On 16 December 2015, the ED seized Karti Chidambaram's laptop and files. He echoed his father's defense, saying, "Neither I nor any of my family members have any connections with the said firms." The ED said it was probing a transaction between Karti Chidambaram and Aircel that had taken place immediately prior to the latter company's approval by the Foreign Investment Promotion Board.

On 29 February 2016, the Pioneer newspaper reported that Karti Chidambaram was involved in extensive international business activities, many of them involving various tax havens. Newly discovered documents showed that Karti Chidambaram had "built a massive empire for himself through investments in real estate and other financial dealings across the world." The fresh evidence revealed details of business deals in London, Dubai, South Africa, Philippines, Thailand, Singapore, Malaysia, Sri Lanka, British Virgin Island, France, the US, Switzerland, Greece, and Spain. It was reported that Karti Chidambaram had enriched himself especially from 2006 to 2014, the period when his father was Finance Minister and Home Minister.

It was further revealed that Advantage Singapore, a subsidiary of Advantage, owned the following: 88 acres at Surridge Farm, Somerset; Cambridge-based Artevea Digital Ltd.; a majority stake in Lanka Fortune Residencies, which in turn owned several hotels; three farms and vineyards in South Africa; land in Thailand; part of BVI-based Full Innovations, Ltd.; a residential flat in Malaysia; franchises of Café Coffee Day in Malaysia; a Barcelona-based subsidiary, Advantage Estrategia Esportiva SLU; and a substantial percentage of the Pampelonn Organisation in France.

On 1 March 2016, the upper house of India's parliament, the Rajya Sabha, adjourned after the AIADMK party demanded it take action against Karti Chidambaram for his business activities. On 2 March 2016, Karti Chidambaram repeated his claim that he was neither a shareholder nor a director of Advantage and that he knew nothing about Sequoia. On 19 April 2016, ED raided Sequoia, which had paid Advantage Rs 8,500 per share for 30,000 shares of Vasan that Advantage had acquired at Rs 100 per share. On 26 April 2016, the New Indian Express reported that Advantage had in actuality paid only a third, that is Rs 33 per share, of the recorded Rs 100 per share cost for the shares. It had then sold 60,000 shares of Vasan to Sequoia, taking Rs. 7,500 per share for the first 30,000 shares and an unknown sum for the other 30,000 shares. The ED believed that Karti Chidambaram was at the centre of these transactions.

Also on 26 April 2016, the Express proved that the Chidambarams owned Advantage through what is known as "benami," or front-men, arrangements. The evidence took the form of identical wills, drafted by Karti Chidambaram, signed by four front men, and executed on 19 June 2013, in which the front men left their shares of Advantage to Karti Chidambaram's daughter and named Karti Chidambaram as executor. The wills left 60% of Advantage Strategic to Chidambaram's family, and the rest to Ausbridge Holdings, which at the time owned two-thirds of Advantage. 95% of the shares in Ausbridge had been owned by Karti Chidambaram until 2011, but in that year "the going got hot" and he transferred his shares to Mohanan Rajesh, from whom he had bought Ausbridge. The remainder of the shares in Advantage had been handed over to the four "benamis," or front men: C.B.N. Reddy, Padma Viswanathan, Ravi Viswanathan, and Bhaskararaman.

It was reported on 23 May 2016, that ED had sought information from the UK, UAE, South Africa, US, Greece, Spain, Switzerland, France, Malaysia, Singapore, Thailand, Sri Lanka and British Virgin Islands about properties and transactions of Advantage, Sequoia, WestBridge, and other firms purportedly linked to Karti Chidambaram. On 5 July 2016, Karti Chidambaram failed to appear at the ED in response to a summons in connection with the Aircel-Maxis probe. The ED was investigating alleged violations of the Prevention of Money Laundering Act on the part of Advantage and Chess Global Advisory Services Pvt Ltd, of which Karti Chidambaram was a director.

In June 2017, a 'Look Out Circular' (LOC) was issued by the Bureau of Immigration. The Madras High Court stayed the LOC against Karti Chidambaram stating that the issuance of the circular the day after issuing a summons to him was unwarranted. This was in response to a joint petition by Karti Chidambaram, C.B.N. Reddy, Ravi Visvanathan, Mohanan Rajesh and S. Bhaskararaman, who were all issued the circular. The petition stated that the centre had been pursuing a politically motivated vendetta against the petitioner's family and the issuance of the LOC is the latest in a series of concerted actions by the Central government's agencies to damage the reputation of Karti Chidambaram and discredit his father, P Chidambaram.

In August 2017, Karti Chidambaram appeared before the CBI in connection to a case involving FIPB approval of INX Media.

In 2017, Karti Chidambaram initiated a campaign against corruption in elections. The campaign was launched in RK Nagar Constituency of Chennai by G67, an organisation of individuals born after 1967. Over 500 volunteers went door-to-door seeking signatures on a pledge to refuse accepting money while voting for a particular party. While the campaign was criticised by some, several opposition party members came out in support of it.

In February 2018, Karti Chidambaram was arrested by the CBI in a money laundering case, where he was accused of receiving Rs. 1 million money from a media company for using his influence to manipulate a tax probe against it. In March 2018, he applied for bail, and the judge assigned to hear his bail plea, Justice Indermeet Kaur of the Delhi High Court, recused herself from hearing the plea without providing a reason. He was granted bail by a different bench of the Delhi High Court.

In October 2018, the Enforcement Directorate said it has attached assets worth Rs. 54 crore of Karti Chidambaram in India, Spain and the UK in connection with a money laundering case related to INX Media, an action termed "bizarre and outlandish" by him.

In May 2019, Karti approached the Supreme court for return of his amount deposited for travelling abroad. The court however advised him to pay attention to his constituency instead.

In December 2020, he became the most raided person in India.

== Electoral performance ==
=== Lok Sabha ===
Year	Constituency	Party	Votes	%	Opponent	Opponent Party	Opponent Votes	%	Result	Margin	%
2024	Sivaganga	INC	427,677	40.6	Xavier Das	AIADMK	222,013	21.08	Won	205,664	19.52
2019	Sivaganga	INC	566,104	52.36	H. Raja	BJP	233,860	21.63	Won	332,244	30.73
2014	Sivaganga	INC	104,678	10.27	P. R. Senthilnathan	AIADMK	475,993	46.71	Lost	-371,315	-36.44

== See also ==
- 2G spectrum case
