= Sivaganga Assembly constituency =

One of the 234 State Legislative Assembly Constituencies in Tamil Nadu, in India

Coordinates: 9.85°N 78.49°E

Sivaganga
- Constituency No. 186 for the Tamil Nadu Legislative Assembly

Constituency details
- Country: India
- Region: South India
- State: Tamil Nadu
- District: Sivaganga
- Lok Sabha constituency: Sivaganga
- Established: 1951
- Total electors: 2,78,609
- Reservation: None

Member of Legislative Assembly
- 17th Tamil Nadu Legislative Assembly
- Incumbent Kulanthai Rani A
- Party: TVK
- Alliance: TVK+
- Elected year: 2026

Sivagangai is a state assembly constituency in Sivagangai district in Tamil Nadu. It is one of the 234 State Legislative Assembly Constituencies in Tamil Nadu, in India.

The current Member of Legislative Assembly (MLA) of the constituency is P. R. Senthilnathan from the AIADMK Party.

== Members of Legislative Assembly ==
From the 1977 elections, the assembly seat was won by Dravida Munnetra Kazhagam (DMK) twice during the 1989 and 1996 elections; the Communist Party of India once during the 2006 elections; Indian National Congress three times during the 1977, 1980 and 1984 elections and the All India Anna Dravida Munnetra Kazhagam (AIADMK) three times during the 1991, 2001 and 2011 elections.

Year	Member	Political party
Madras State
1952	R. V. Swaminathan	Indian National Congress
1957	D. Subramaniya Rajkumar	Independent
1962	R. V. Swaminathan	Indian National Congress
1967	S. Sethuraman	Dravida Munnetra Kazhagam
Tamil Nadu
1971	S. Sethuraman	Dravida Munnetra Kazhagam
1977	O. Subramanian	Indian National Congress
1980	O. Subramanian	Indian National Congress (I)
1984	O. Subramanian	Indian National Congress
1989	B. Manoharan	Dravida Munnetra Kazhagam
1991	K. R. Muruganandam	All India Anna Dravida Munnetra Kazhagam
1996	Pasumpon Kirittinan	Dravida Munnetra Kazhagam
2001	V. Chandran	All India Anna Dravida Munnetra Kazhagam
2006	S. Gunasekaran	Communist Party of India
2011	S. Gunasekaran	Communist Party of India
2016	G. Baskaran	All India Anna Dravida Munnetra Kazhagam
2021	P. R. Senthilnathan	All India Anna Dravida Munnetra Kazhagam
2026	Kulanthai Rani	Tamilaga Vettri Kazhagam

== Election results ==
Vote share of winning candidates
2026	34.45%
2021	40.66%
2016	43.15%
2011	47.82%
2006	34.14%
2001	48.68%
1996	60.65%
1991	72.69%
1989	33.98%
1984	55.92%
1980	56.94%
1977	30.59%
1971	60.19%
1967	59.22%
1962	53.93%
1957	61.40%
1952	50.56%

=== 2026 ===
2026 Tamil Nadu Legislative Assembly election: Sivaganga
Party	Candidate	Votes	%	±%
TVK	Kulanthai Rani A	73,737	34.45	New
AIADMK	Senthilnathan PR	58,656	27.40	▼13.26
Mukkulathor Pulipadai (DMK)	Karunaas S	57,300	26.77	
All India Puratchi Thalaivar Makkal Munnetra Kazhagam	Muruganantham Guru	1,186	0.55	New
NOTA	NOTA	1,053	0.49	▼0.14
BSP	Marimuthu K	447	0.21	New
Independent	Karthik M	369	0.17	New
Desiya Makkal Sakthi Katchi	Rajamanickam M	319	0.15	New
Independent	Prabakaran S.T	282	0.13	New
Independent	Paulsamy	282	0.13	New
Independent	Nagaprabu	264	0.12	New
TVK	Rajesh X	263	0.12	New
Party For The Rights Of Other Backward Classes	Rajkumar C	223	0.10	New
Independent	Kaleeswaran M	210	0.10	New
Independent	Ramesh K	195	0.09	New
Independent	Santhanam	161	0.08	New
Independent	Irudayaraj V	99	0.05	New
Margin of victory		15,081	7.05	▲1.48
Turnout		2,14,067	76.83	▲9.74
Registered electors		2,78,609		▼22,554
TVK gain from AIADMK		Swing	▲34.45	

=== 2021 ===
2021 Tamil Nadu Legislative Assembly election: Sivaganga
Party	Candidate	Votes	%	±%
AIADMK	P. R. Senthilnathan	82,153	40.66%	−2.49
CPI	S. Gunasekaran	70,900	35.09%	+27.11
AMMK	K. Anbarasan	19,824	9.81%	New
MNM	C. Joseph	2,105	1.04%	New
Independent	P. Viswanathan	1,332	0.66%	New
NOTA	NOTA	1,270	0.63%	−0.18
Margin of victory		11,253	5.57%	2.06%
Turnout		202,044	67.09%	−2.20%
Rejected ballots		394	0.20%	
Registered electors		301,163		
AIADMK hold		Swing	-2.49%	

=== 2016 ===
2016 Tamil Nadu Legislative Assembly election: Sivaganga
Party	Candidate	Votes	%	±%
AIADMK	G. Baskaran	81,697	43.15%	New
DMK	M. Sathianathan @ Meppal M. Sakthi	75,061	39.64%	New
CPI	S. Gunasekaran	15,114	7.98%	−39.83
All India Forward Bloc (Subhasist)	G. M. Srithar Vandaiyar	5,214	2.75%	New
ETMK	T. Vellaikkannu	1,809	0.96%	New
NOTA	NOTA	1,530	0.81%	New
PMK	N. Rajasekaran	1,284	0.68%	New
GOKMK	M. Kaleeswaran	981	0.52%	New
Margin of victory		6,636	3.50%	0.72%
Turnout		189,342	69.29%	−4.16%
Registered electors		273,251		
AIADMK gain from CPI		Swing	-4.67%	

=== 2011 ===
2011 Tamil Nadu Legislative Assembly election: Sivaganga
Party	Candidate	Votes	%	±%
CPI	S. Gunasekaran	75,176	47.82%	+13.68
INC	V. Rajasekaran	70,794	45.03%	New
BJP	P. M. Rajendran	2,957	1.88%	+0.44
IJK	C. Kulanthaisamy	2,484	1.58%	New
Independent	R. Gandhi	1,815	1.15%	New
JMM	Kaleeswaran @ M. Kalaiyappan	1,725	1.10%	New
Independent	P. Subramanian	1,636	1.04%	New
Margin of victory		4,382	2.79%	−2.50%
Turnout		157,216	73.46%	10.65%
Registered electors		214,027		
CPI hold		Swing	13.68%	

=== 2006 ===
2006 Tamil Nadu Legislative Assembly election: Sivaganga
Party	Candidate	Votes	%	±%
CPI	S. Gunasekaran	39,488	34.14%	New
MDMK	S. Sevanthiappan	33,375	28.85%	+25.89
Independent	V. Rajasekaran	30,740	26.57%	New
DMDK	C. R. Balu	6,114	5.29%	New
Independent	Dhanalakshmi	1,730	1.50%	New
BJP	S. R. Swaminaathan	1,667	1.44%	New
Independent	M. Selvam	792	0.68%	New
Independent	M. Sundarapandian	657	0.57%	New
Margin of victory		6,113	5.28%	1.26%
Turnout		115,675	62.81%	5.01%
Registered electors		184,172		
CPI gain from AIADMK		Swing	-14.54%	

=== 2001 ===
2001 Tamil Nadu Legislative Assembly election: Sivaganga
Party	Candidate	Votes	%	±%
AIADMK	V. Chandran	51,708	48.68%	+19.09
DMK	Pasumpon Tha. Krishnan	47,435	44.65%	−15.99
MDMK	N. Jeyaraman	3,149	2.96%	−3.93
Independent	J. K. Joseph	2,430	2.29%	New
Independent	M. Naina Mohammed	670	0.63%	New
Margin of victory		4,273	4.02%	−27.04%
Turnout		106,230	57.80%	−5.72%
Registered electors		183,912		
AIADMK gain from DMK		Swing	-11.97%	

=== 1996 ===
1996 Tamil Nadu Legislative Assembly election: Sivaganga
Party	Candidate	Votes	%	±%
DMK	Pasumpon Tha. Krishnan	64,438	60.65%	+35.93
AIADMK	K. R. Muruganandam	31,437	29.59%	−43.1
MDMK	Krishnan Peri	7,327	6.90%	New
BJP	N. Chockalingam	1,533	1.44%	New
Independent	Sadumangalaswamy @ Anbumalaikannan	696	0.66%	New
Margin of victory		33,001	31.06%	−16.91%
Turnout		106,254	63.52%	−0.07%
Registered electors		175,572		
DMK gain from AIADMK		Swing	-12.04%	

=== 1991 ===
1991 Tamil Nadu Legislative Assembly election: Sivaganga
Party	Candidate	Votes	%	±%
AIADMK	K. R. Muruganandam	69,506	72.69%	+51.65
DMK	B. Manoharan	23,635	24.72%	−9.27
Independent	M. Manoharan	993	1.04%	New
PMK	A. Sathiah	735	0.77%	New
Margin of victory		45,871	47.97%	46.20%
Turnout		95,621	63.59%	−7.18%
Registered electors		157,969		
AIADMK gain from DMK		Swing	38.70%	

=== 1989 ===
1989 Tamil Nadu Legislative Assembly election: Sivaganga
Party	Candidate	Votes	%	±%
DMK	B. Manoharan	33,982	33.98%	New
INC	E. M. Sudarsana Natchiappan	32,214	32.22%	−23.7
AIADMK	P. Thiagarajan	21,033	21.03%	New
AIADMK	P. Anbalagan	9,888	9.89%	New
Independent	A. Kottaiyan	1,458	1.46%	New
Margin of victory		1,768	1.77%	−25.20%
Turnout		99,992	70.77%	−3.42%
Registered electors		143,895		
DMK gain from INC		Swing	-21.93%	

=== 1984 ===
1984 Tamil Nadu Legislative Assembly election: Sivaganga
Party	Candidate	Votes	%	±%
INC	O. Subramanian	49,407	55.92%	−1.02
CPI	V. R. Ayyadurai	25,582	28.95%	New
Independent	S. P. Ulganathan	10,183	11.52%	New
Independent	K. R. Muruganandam	2,768	3.13%	New
Margin of victory		23,825	26.96%	11.19%
Turnout		88,358	74.19%	11.32%
Registered electors		126,030		
INC hold		Swing	-1.02%	

=== 1980 ===
1980 Tamil Nadu Legislative Assembly election: Sivaganga
Party	Candidate	Votes	%	±%
INC	O. Subramanian	41,327	56.94%	+26.35
Independent	N. Natarajasamy	29,875	41.16%	New
Independent	Muthusamy Bharathi	847	1.17%	New
Independent	V. Kalla Kontan	530	0.73%	New
Margin of victory		11,452	15.78%	12.62%
Turnout		72,579	62.87%	−3.02%
Registered electors		116,688		
INC hold		Swing	26.35%	

=== 1977 ===
1977 Tamil Nadu Legislative Assembly election: Sivaganga
Party	Candidate	Votes	%	±%
INC	O. Subramanian	23,495	30.59%	−4.47
AIADMK	K. R. Muruganandam	21,066	27.43%	New
DMK	A. Shanmugam	12,299	16.01%	−44.18
Independent	P. Aathinamilaki	8,135	10.59%	New
JP	Sk. Ar. Sm. Ramanathan Chettiar	6,988	9.10%	New
Independent	V. Velayuthan Chettiar	3,453	4.50%	New
Independent	V. S. Gurusamy	1,369	1.78%	New
Margin of victory		2,429	3.16%	−21.96%
Turnout		76,805	65.89%	−5.86%
Registered electors		118,391		
INC gain from DMK		Swing	-29.60%	

=== 1971 ===
1971 Tamil Nadu Legislative Assembly election: Sivaganga
Party	Candidate	Votes	%	±%
DMK	S. Sethuraman	42,320	60.19%	+0.97
INC	O. Subramanian	24,654	35.06%	−5.72
Independent	Dl Nagasundaram	2,685	3.82%	New
Independent	Muthulakshmi	651	0.93%	New
Margin of victory		17,666	25.13%	6.69%
Turnout		70,310	71.75%	−7.97%
Registered electors		101,660		
DMK hold		Swing	0.97%	

=== 1967 ===
1967 Madras Legislative Assembly election: Sivaganga
Party	Candidate	Votes	%	±%
DMK	S. Sethuraman	41,604	59.22%	New
INC	R. V. Swaminathan	28,654	40.78%	−13.15
Margin of victory		12,950	18.43%	6.94%
Turnout		70,258	79.71%	10.60%
Registered electors		90,931		
DMK gain from INC		Swing	5.29%	

=== 1962 ===
1962 Madras Legislative Assembly election: Sivaganga
Party	Candidate	Votes	%	±%
INC	R. V. Swaminathan	43,410	53.93%	+33.46
SWA	Kalailingam	34,159	42.44%	New
Independent	Palanichamy	1,958	2.43%	New
Independent	Muthuramalingam	965	1.20%	New
Margin of victory		9,251	11.49%	−29.44%
Turnout		80,492	69.11%	10.94%
Registered electors		120,470		
INC gain from Independent		Swing	-7.47%	

=== 1957 ===
1957 Madras Legislative Assembly election: Sivaganga
Party	Candidate	Votes	%	±%
Independent	D. Subramaniarajkumar	35,237	61.40%	New
INC	R. V. Swaminathan	11,747	20.47%	−30.09
Independent	V. Veerappan	3,334	5.81%	New
Independent	S. Manuveludayar	2,648	4.61%	New
Independent	Nithyasamathanam	2,455	4.28%	New
CPI	S. Narayanan	1,971	3.43%	New
Margin of victory		23,490	40.93%	13.23%
Turnout		57,392	58.17%	1.44%
Registered electors		98,666		
Independent gain from INC		Swing	10.84%	

=== 1952 ===
1952 Madras Legislative Assembly election: Sivaganga
Party	Candidate	Votes	%	±%
INC	R. V. Swaminathan	21,502	50.56%	New
KMPP	Velayudam Chettiar	9,723	22.86%	New
Independent	Seshadri	5,649	13.28%	New
Socialist Party (India)	Raju Pillai	3,643	8.57%	New
Independent	Manickam Servai	2,014	4.74%	New
Margin of victory		11,779	27.70%	
Turnout		42,531	56.73%	
Registered electors		74,969		
INC win (new seat)				
