= Idontwantdowry.com =

- Website type: Online dating service
- Creator: Nalini Chidambaram
- Website: www.idontwantdowry.com
- Commercial: Yes
- Registration: Yes
- Launched: April 2, 2006
- Current status: Active

IdontWantDowry.com is India's first matrimonial website for dowry-free marriages. The website was launched on April 2, 2006, by Nalini Chidambaram, a senior high court advocate in Chennai. Despite being outlawed in 1961, the dowry system has continued to survive in some social castes. IdontWantDowry.com attempts to create a meeting place for brides and grooms who want to marry without a dowry. As of 2017, IdontWantDowry.com has more than 5,500 members, and 29 couples have married through the website.
