= H. Raja =

Indian politician

H Raja
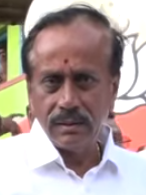

Passenger Amenities Committee, Ministry of Railways (India)
- Incumbent
- Assumed office November 2014

Member of Legislative Assembly
- In office 13 May 2001 – 11 May 2006
- Preceded by: N. Sundaram
- Succeeded by: N. Sundaram
- Constituency: Karaikudi

Personal details
- Born: Hariharan Raja Sharma; 29 September 1957 (age 69) Melattur, Thanjavur district, India
- Party: Bharatiya Janata Party
- Parent: Hariharan Sharma (father)
- Education: Madurai Kamaraj University
- Profession: Chartered Accountant, Politician

Hariharan Raja Sharma also known as H. Raja is an Indian politician. He started his political-social life as an Rashtriya Swayamsevak Sangh (RSS) promoter. He was a MLA representing the Karaikudi constituency in the Tamil Nadu Legislative Assembly from 2001 to 2006, as part of the Dravida Munnetra Kazhagam (DMK)-led alliance. He was one of the national secretaries of the Bharatiya Janata Party from 2014 to 2020.

H. Raja is known for his controversial statements and statements against other religions.

== Personal life ==
H. Raja was born as Hariharan Raja Sharma in a village called Melattur near Thanjavur to Hariharan Sharma and Lalitha in a Tamil Brahmin family. His father Hariharan Sharma who was also an active RSS member went to jail when RSS was banned in 1948. H. Raja published the biggest Tamil-Sanskrit dictionary with over 45,000 words compiled by his father after his demise.

By profession, Raja is a chartered accountant.

== Political career ==
H. Raja was a Rashtriya Swayamsevak Sangh activist before he joined the BJP in 1989. He assumed several roles in BJP including district convener in 1991, followed by state secretary, state general secretary and then, national secretary in 2014.

Raja unsuccessfully contested the 1998 Lok Sabha elections. Raja was given a BJP candidate seat from Sivaganga in 1993 and lost. He was elected as an MLA for the Karaikudi constituency in the 2001 Tamil Nadu Legislative Assembly Election, as a part of DMK-led alliance. Raja lost in the state assembly elections from Thyagarayanagar constituency in 2006. He was the BJP candidate from Sivaganga constituency in the 2014 Indian general elections, but lost to AIADMK's P.R. Senthilnathan.

In the 2016 Tamil Nadu Legislative Assembly election Raja contested from Alandur constituency and lost. In February 2016, Raja was appointed the chairman of Passenger Amenities Committee. The committee addresses the grievances of the passengers and ensures cleanliness, hygiene and safety of the passengers. In 2017, the committee approved the printing of passenger train tickets in regional languages such as Tamil, Telugu, Gujarati and Odia.

H. Raja contested Bharat Scouts and Guides (Tamil Nadu) in 2017 for the post of president and managed to secure only 52 of the 286 votes polled (18.18%) and lost against P. Mani who got 234 votes (81.82%). However Raja refused to accept his defeat and said the election has to be countermanded.

In September 2019, the people of the Veppur village in Karur district along with both DMK and AIADMK members printed and pasted posters across the village opposing H Raja's arrival for the upcoming Vinayagar Chathurthi festival fearing possibility of communal violence that could be caused due to his statements. On the day of Vinayagar Chathurthi, the police of the village imposed 144 to prevent the entry of H. Raja in the village.

He was a candidate for the Lok Sabha in the 2019 election but lost to Karti Chidambaram. He was removed from his post as BJP national secretary on 26 September 2020.

Raja contested from Karaikudi in the 2021 Tamil Nadu Legislative Assembly election and lost to INC candidate S Mangudi. After the election, the BJP Sivangangai district president and many senior executives resigned in protest against H Raja and over 90 BJP functionaries threatened to resign alleging highhandedness and mismanagement of party funds by Raja. The cadres alleged that H Raja hasn't spent the party funds from the BJP but has been constructing a new house at a budget of ₹4 crore and a farmhouse, and questioned the source of money. The BJP district president said that he feared that Raja might cause harm to his family members through the BJP district vice president.

== Statements ==
The Indian Express reported that H Raja has a history of speaking against other religions, inciting communal disharmony and making inflammatory speeches. Deccan Herald reported that H Raja has a custom of labelling everyone who questions the BJP, the RSS, or Narendra Modi as "anti-Indian" and infusing a communal tone into every incident.

The Director General of Police (DGP) filed a case against H. Raja in October 2014 for making inflammatory public speeches against Jesus, Muslims, Christians and Periyar in a meeting organized by the 'Hindu Dharma protection movement' in January 2014. Earlier various political groups and organizations filed a complaint to the DGP asking to take action against Raja for claiming that "Christians and Muslims are not Tamil people" in the meeting, where the audience responded with statements such as "beat them, kill them". The complainants said such speeches had created communal violence before. Later, Raja sought to ban Burqas for Muslim students and claimed they use it to cheat in exams. His statements led to protests by Muslims groups demanding action but no action was taken against him.

The Madras High Court has directed the Chennai police to register an FIR against him in October 2017 and investigate H Raja's statement which the complainant claimed could instigate communal riots, when H Raja falsely claimed that an attack on a man is done by Muslim outfits. In October 2017, H. Raja claimed that actor Vijay is a Christian and claimed that is the reason for the criticism of GST in his film and his hate for Modi. Posting a photo of actor Vijay's voter's ID and official letterhead which showed his full name and indicated that Vijay is a Christian and said "Truth is bitter". Many people claimed that Vijay's religion is irrelevant to the controversy.

On 22 March 2018, the Madras High court requested the Chennai police to check his mental health after a lawyer accused him of speaking to create violence and communal disharmony. On March 6, 2018, A remark was posted from the verified Facebook page of BJP National Secretary H. Raja, stating, "Who is Lenin? What is his connection to India? What is the connection of communists to India? Lenin's statue was destroyed in Tripura. Today Lenin's statue, tomorrow Tamil Nadu's EVR Ramaswami's statue”. Raja blamed his Facebook administrator and said he had removed him and later apologised. The post was soon deleted. After MDMK leader Vaiko began criticising Narendra Modi, Raja threatened Vaiko claiming that his "safe return" home could not be assured. H Raja in September 2018, accused AIDMK MP A Arunmozhithevan of encroaching land belonging to the temples, Arunmozhithevan challenged to prove the allegations and claimed that Raja is mentally affected and seeking to created communal tensions in the state. Later, around 500 students of Thiru Vi Ka college blocked roads demanding action against Raja for his habit of making derogatory statements. The Central Crime branch registered cases against Raja.

H. Raja called DMK MP Kanimozhi an illegitimate child of M. Karunanidhi in April 2018. Kanimozhi said that she would not respond to him. The incident created a widespread agitation by the DMK and other political parties. The Karumathampatti police booked him on defamatory charges after five months. On September 2, 2020, H Raja falsely claimed in his social media post that a murder of a man was committed by Muslims, since then many other popular BJP verified handles amplified with #HindusInDanger hashtag. Tamil Nadu Police clarified that it was a case of personal enmity where the ones involved in this crime belonged to different religious backgrounds. Raja statements during an interview in September 2021 were condemned by the Chennai Press Club, Centre of Media Persons for Change after he called journalists as "presstitutes". Journalists and activists asked the media to boycott Raja's meetings in the future.

== Legal proceeding ==
On 22 October 2018, Raja apologised to Madras High Court after he was caught on camera abusing the police and the higher judiciary with derogatory words. The video showed Raja abusing the Madras High Court and the police because he was not permitted to enter a communally sensitive area and the Hindu Munnani was not permitted erect a stage on the road near a mosque. Raja was heard accusing the police officers of being "corrupt" and "anti-Hindu," and claiming that they were on the payrolls of Christian and Muslim organisations. Initially, he claimed the video was fake and later he said that it happened in a fit of rage before appearing against the judges of the Madras high court. The Madurai Bench of the Madras High Court in January 2020 directed the Thirumayam police to file a final report on the investigation into the incident. The Court granted additional time of two months to the Thirumayam Police to file a final report after the police requested it in January 2020. Raja sought anticipatory bail in July 2020 after the police filed a chargesheet. The court dismissed his plea in the same month citing that Raja should appear before the Judicial Magistrate.

== Elections ==
=== Tamil Nadu Legislative Assembly Elections ===
H. Raja had represented as MLA of Karaikudi in the Tamil Nadu Assembly from 2001 to 2006.

Year	Election	Party	Constituency	Result	Votes gained	Vote %
2001	2001 Tamil Nadu Legislative Assembly Election	Bharatiya Janata Party	Karaikudi	Won	54,093	48.40%
2006	2006 Tamil Nadu Legislative Assembly Election	Bharatiya Janata Party	Alandur	Lost	9,298	3.27%
2016	2016 Tamil Nadu Legislative Assembly Election	Bharatiya Janata Party	Thyagaraya Nagar	Lost	19,888	14.01%
2021	2021 Tamil Nadu Legislative Assembly Election	Bharatiya Janata Party	Karaikudi	Lost	54,365	25.59%

=== Indian general elections (Lok Sabha) ===
H. Raja electoral performances in the Indian general elections (Lok Sabha).

Year	Election	Party	PC Name	Result	Votes gained	Vote %
1999	13th Lok Sabha	Bharatiya Janata Party	Sivaganga	Lost	2,22,267	36.34%
2014	16th Lok Sabha	Bharatiya Janata Party	Sivaganga	Lost	1,33,763	13.02%
2019	17th Lok Sabha	Bharatiya Janata Party	Sivaganga	Lost	2,33,860	21.56%
