= Kulanthai =

Kulanthai is a given name. People with the name include:

- Kulanthai Shanmugalingam
- Kulanthai Rani
