= Sivaganga Lok Sabha constituency =

Parliamentary constituency in Tamil Nadu, India

Coordinates: 9.8°N 78.5°E

Sivaganga
- Lok Sabha constituency
- Interactive map of Sivaganga Loksabha constituency, post-2008 delimitation

Constituency details
- Country: India
- Region: South India
- State: Tamil Nadu
- Assembly constituencies: Tirumayam; Alangudi; Karaikudi; Tiruppattur; Sivaganga; Manamadurai
- Established: 1967
- Total electors: 1,552,019
- Reservation: None

Member of Parliament
- 18th Lok Sabha
- Incumbent Karti P. Chidambaram
- Party: INC
- Alliance: INDIA
- Elected year: 2024
- Preceded by: P. R. Senthilnathan

Sivaganga Lok Sabha constituency is one of the 39 Lok Sabha (parliamentary) constituencies in Tamil Nadu, a state in southern India. Its Tamil Nadu Parliamentary Constituency number is 31.

== Assembly segments ==
=== From 2009 ===
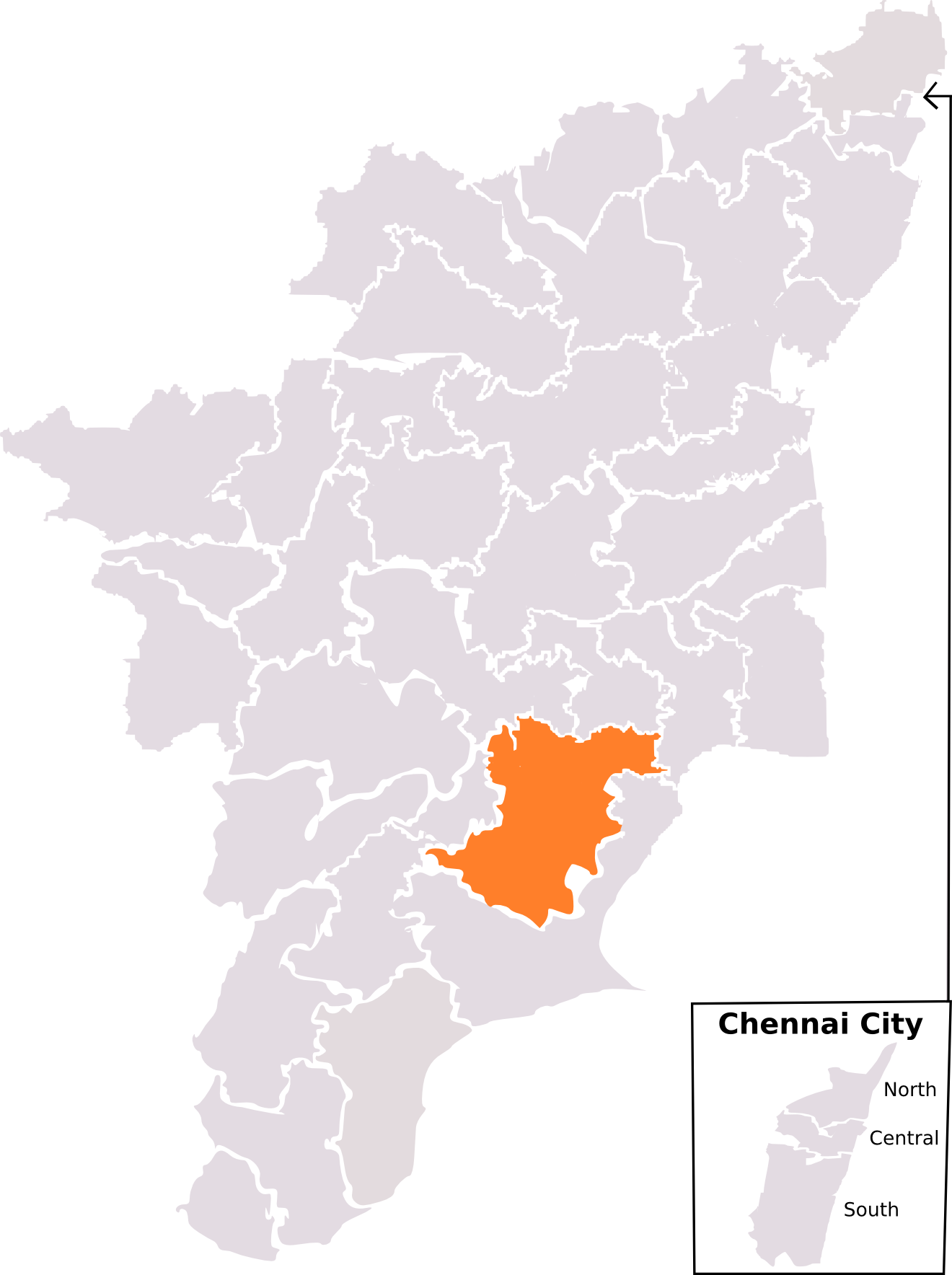
Sivaganga constituency as laid out by 2008 Delimitation

Constituency number	Name	Reserved for (SC/ST/None)	District	Party	2024 Lead
181	Thirumayam	None	Pudukkottai	DMK	INC
182	Alangudi	None	Pudukkottai	DMK	INC
184	Karaikudi	None	Sivaganga	TVK	INC
185	Tiruppattur	None	Sivaganga	TVK	INC
186	Sivaganga	None	Sivaganga	TVK	INC
187	Manamadurai	SC	Sivaganga	TVK	INC

=== Before 2009 ===
1. Thirumayam
2. Tirupathur
3. Karaikudi
4. Thiruvadanai (moved to Ramanathapuram Constituency)
5. Ilayankudi (defunct)
6. Sivagangai

== History ==
From 1967, the Sivanganga parliament seat was held by the Indian National Congress for nine times during 1980, 1984, 1989, 1991, 1999, 2004, 2009 and 2019 elections, ADMK twice during the 1977 and 2014 elections, Tamil Maanila Congress twice during 1996 and 1998 elections, and Dravida Munnetra Kazhagam twice during the 1967 and 1971 elections.

Current Member of Parliament from the constituency is Karti Chidambaram from the INC.

== Members of Parliament ==
Period	Name	Party
1967	Kiruttinan	Dravida Munnetra Kazhagam
1971	Kiruttinan	Dravida Munnetra Kazhagam
1977	Periasamy Thiagarajan	All India Anna Dravida Munnetra Kazhagam
1980	R. V. Swaminathan	Indian National Congress
1984	P. Chidambaram	Indian National Congress
1989	P. Chidambaram	Indian National Congress
1991	P. Chidambaram	Indian National Congress
1996	P. Chidambaram	Tamil Maanila Congress
1998	P. Chidambaram	Tamil Maanila Congress
1999	E. M. Sudarsana Natchiappan	Indian National Congress
2004	P. Chidambaram	Indian National Congress
2009	P. Chidambaram	Indian National Congress
2014	P. R. Senthilnathan	All India Anna Dravida Munnetra Kazhagam
2019	Karti Chidambaram	Indian National Congress
2024	Karti Chidambaram	Indian National Congress

== Election results ==
Vote share of Winning candidates
2024	40.60%
2019	52.36%
2014	46.71%
2009	43.17%
2004	60.01%
1999	40.23%
1998	51.15%
1996	64.79%
1991	67.49%
1989	65.86%
1984	68.10%
1980	60.81%
1977	71.30%
1971	61.21%
1967	53.17%

=== General Elections 2024 ===
2024 Indian general election: Sivaganga
Party	Candidate	Votes	%	±%
INC	Karti Chidambaram	427,677	40.60	−11.76
AIADMK	Xavier Das	222,013	21.08	New
BJP	Devanathan Yadav	195,788	18.59	−3.04
NOTA	None of the above	8,189	0.78	−0.08
Margin of victory		205,664	19.52	−11.21
Turnout		10,53,419	64.26	−5.64
INC hold		Swing	-11.76	

=== General Elections 2019 ===
2019 Indian general election: Sivaganga
Party	Candidate	Votes	%	±%
INC	Karti Chidambaram	566,104	52.36	+42.09
BJP	H. Raja	2,33,860	21.63	+8.50
AMMK	V. Pandi	1,22,534	11.33	New
MNM	Snehan	22,931	2.12	New
NOTA	None of the above	9,283	0.86	+0.07
Margin of victory		332,244	30.73	+8.22
Turnout		10,81,167	69.90	−2.49
Registered electors		1,552,019		+9.89
INC gain from AIADMK		Swing	+5.65	

=== General Elections 2014 ===
2014 Indian general election: Sivaganga
Party	Candidate	Votes	%	±%
AIADMK	P. R. Senthilnathan	475,993	46.71	+3.97
DMK	Dhurai Raaj Subha	246,608	24.20	New
BJP	H. Raja	133,763	13.13	New
INC	Karti Chidambaram	104,678	10.27	−32.90
CPI	S. Krishnan	20,473	2.01	New
NOTA	None of the above	8,042	0.79	N/A
Margin of victory		229,385	22.51	22.08
Turnout		1,018,994	72.75	+1.26
AIADMK gain from INC		Swing	+3.54	

=== General Elections 2009 ===
2009 Indian general election: Sivaganga
Party	Candidate	Votes	%	±%
INC	P. Chidambaram	334,348	43.17%	−16.84%
AIADMK	R. S. Raja Kannappan	330,994	42.74%	7.12%
DMDK	Barwatha Regina Papa	60,054	7.75%	
Independent	Thoothai M. Selvam	6,997	0.90%	
BSP	M. G. Devar	6,600	0.85%	−0.12%
Independent	P. Malairaj	6,481	0.84%	
Margin of victory		3,354	0.43%	−23.96%
Turnout		774,440	70.98%	9.31%
Registered electors		1,092,438		0.82%
INC hold		Swing	-16.84%	

=== General Elections 2004 ===
2004 Indian general election: Sivaganga
Party	Candidate	Votes	%	±%
INC	P. Chidambaram	400,393	60.01%	19.78%
AIADMK	S. P. Karuppiah	237,668	35.62%	
Independent	Subramanian Mutharaiyar M. Arimalam	9,709	1.46%	
BSP	K. Nowshad Ali Khan	6,503	0.97%	
Independent	N. Chidambaram	4,512	0.68%	
Margin of victory		162,725	24.39%	20.50%
Turnout		667,208	61.58%	5.72%
Registered electors		1,083,542		−3.01%
INC hold		Swing	19.78%	

=== General Elections 1999 ===
1999 Indian general election: Sivaganga
Party	Candidate	Votes	%	±%
INC	E. M. Sudarsana Natchiappan	246,078	40.23%	34.49%
BJP	H. Raja	222,267	36.34%	
TMC(M)	P. Chidambaram	127,528	20.85%	
AIFB	S. M. Vimalraj	3,796	0.62%	
Independent	V. Chidambaram	3,151	0.52%	
RJD	A. Ramu	2,909	0.48%	
Margin of victory		23,811	3.89%	−6.06%
Turnout		611,631	55.86%	−7.95%
Registered electors		1,117,223		3.81%
INC gain from TMC(M)		Swing	-24.55%	

=== General Elections 1998 ===
1998 Indian general election: Sivaganga
Party	Candidate	Votes	%	±%
TMC(M)	P. Chidambaram	303,854	51.15%	
AIADMK	K. Kalimuthu	244,713	41.19%	
INC	M. Gowri Shankaran	34,114	5.74%	−20.79%
PT	Santhi Udayappan	6,847	1.15%	
RJD	E. Nallasamy	3,839	0.65%	
Margin of victory		59,141	9.96%	−28.30%
Turnout		594,036	57.45%	−6.36%
Registered electors		1,076,206		1.78%
TMC(M) hold		Swing	-13.64%	

=== General Elections 1996 ===
1996 Indian general election: Sivaganga
Party	Candidate	Votes	%	±%
TMC(M)	P. Chidambaram	418,774	64.79%	
INC	M. Gowri Shankaran	171,472	26.53%	−40.96%
MDMK	A. Ganesan	41,164	6.37%	
BJP	P. Pattabiramasamy	6,739	1.04%	
Independent	A. Jesu	3,115	0.48%	
Margin of victory		247,302	38.26%	−0.12%
Turnout		646,379	63.81%	1.41%
Registered electors		1,057,381		6.02%
TMC(M) gain from INC		Swing	-2.70%	

=== General Elections 1991 ===
1991 Indian general election: Sivaganga
Party	Candidate	Votes	%	±%
INC	P. Chidambaram	402,029	67.49%	1.63%
DMK	V. Kasinathan	173,432	29.12%	−3.14%
Independent	S. Nagarajan	2,792	0.47%	
PMK	A. Sathaiah	2,742	0.46%	
Margin of victory		228,597	38.38%	4.77%
Turnout		595,664	62.40%	−3.57%
Registered electors		997,331		−0.53%
INC hold		Swing	1.63%	

=== General Elections 1989 ===
1989 Indian general election: Sivaganga
Party	Candidate	Votes	%	±%
INC	P. Chidambaram	430,290	65.86%	−2.25%
DMK	A. Ganesan	210,738	32.26%	2.53%
Independent	V. Rajangam	3,576	0.55%	
Margin of victory		219,552	33.60%	−4.77%
Turnout		653,349	65.97%	−7.95%
Registered electors		1,002,667		27.89%
INC hold		Swing	-2.25%	

=== General Elections 1984 ===
1984 Indian general election: Sivaganga
Party	Candidate	Votes	%	±%
INC	P. Chidambaram	377,160	68.10%	
DMK	Tha. Kiruttinan	164,627	29.73%	
Independent	M. K. Kumar	12,005	2.17%	
Margin of victory		212,533	38.38%	11.70%
Turnout		553,792	73.92%	3.07%
Registered electors		784,016		8.05%
INC gain from INC(I)		Swing	7.29%	

=== General Elections 1980 ===
1980 Indian general election: Sivaganga
Party	Candidate	Votes	%	±%
INC(I)	R. V. Swaminathan	306,748	60.81%	
CPI	D. Pandian	172,187	34.14%	
Independent	M. Subramanian	17,705	3.51%	
Independent	N. N. K. Seenipulavar	3,073	0.61%	
Independent	V. Somasundaram Odaiyar	2,529	0.50%	
Margin of victory		134,561	26.68%	−17.81%
Turnout		504,428	70.85%	2.44%
Registered electors		725,576		2.15%
INC(I) gain from AIADMK		Swing	-10.49%	

=== General Elections 1977 ===
1977 Indian general election: Sivaganga
Party	Candidate	Votes	%	±%
AIADMK	P. Thiagarajan	338,999	71.30%	
INC(O)	R. Ramanathan Chettiar	127,466	26.81%	
Independent	R. M. Santhakumari	4,716	0.99%	
Independent	V. Somasundaram Odaiyar	4,284	0.90%	
Margin of victory		211,533	44.49%	22.06%
Turnout		475,465	68.41%	−5.82%
Registered electors		710,297		15.59%
AIADMK gain from DMK		Swing	10.09%	

=== General Elections 1971 ===
1971 Indian general election: Sivaganga
Party	Candidate	Votes	%	±%
DMK	Tha. Kiruttinan	273,194	61.21%	8.04%
INC(O)	Kannappa Valliappan	173,106	38.79%	
Margin of victory		100,088	22.43%	8.68%
Turnout		446,300	74.24%	−4.80%
Registered electors		614,497		10.80%
DMK hold		Swing	8.04%	

=== General Elections 1967 ===
1967 Indian general election: Sivaganga
Party	Candidate	Votes	%	±%
DMK	Tha. Kiruttinan	225,106	53.17%	
INC	Subramanian	166,889	39.42%	
CPI	S. Narayanan	26,588	6.28%	
ABJS	S. Krishnasarma	4,795	1.13%	
Margin of victory		58,217	13.75%	
Turnout		423,378	79.03%	
Registered electors		554,582		
DMK win (new seat)				

== Issues ==
=== Demands of the people of Sivaganga Constituency ===
To set up the already planned SIPCOTs at karaikudi and Sivaganga and to encourage more Industries in Sivaganga Constituency. To bring more investors and companies to the already existing SIPCOT at Manamadurai and there by increasing the employment opportunities to the constituency people. To relocate the loss making kirungakottai SIDCO either to manamadurai or to thiruppuvanam since it is located in remote area which leads to poor accessible by public and investors due to which no one is interested in investing in Kirungakottai SIDCO. To provide more employment opportunities based on the Graphite-based jobs in Sivaganga by using the existing graphite mines as like similar to that of Andhra Pradesh's Rajahmundry and also to create the Graphite Mineral-based Industrial Cluster at Sivaganga. To operate the Tamil Nadu's only spices board Park in full-fledged manner which is located at Sivaganga and also steps should be taken by the elected representative to get approval from State Urban Organization Director for the effective functioning of the Spices Park. To bring an Agro Based Industrial cluster related with Capsicum Plantation near Ilayangudi as these areas have more capsicum plantation. To provide and improve optimal situation for those employees who relay on wood charcoal (or charcoal heap) business in and around Manamadurai area and to improve the existing facilities for such businesses in that area thereby improving the employment opportunities by providing a favourable situation to them. To promote employment opportunities on Geographical Indication recognized clay iratics of Manamadurai, Kandangi Sarees, Tiruppachetti Billhooks, Aathangudi Tiles, Chettinad Cuisine. To promote Agro based Industries at Sivaganga and Manamadurai. To improve facilities available at the existing tourism spots in Thirupathur Constituency and Keezhadi. To improve facilities to the existing agro oil, coir based industries and automotive spare parts based industries at Thiruppathur and Singampuneri by providing favourable situation to them. To reconstruct the old airport at Karaikudi and bring it back to service. To construct a new Government Nursing College at Poovanthi and also to add more Facilities in Sivagangai Medical College Hospital. To construct New Government Veterinary College at Kundrakudi and also to construct new IRT Polytechnic College at Manamadurai and also to provide a favourable situation to the people who are relaying in Manufacturing Utensils in Karaikudi region. To get more water facility from Vaigai Dam to Sivagangai District areas to increase the cultivation. Steps should be taken to provide stoppage for all trains at District Headquarters Railway Station Sivaganga (which includes 20973 and 20974 – Ajmeer Rameswaram Humsafar Express, 22535 – Rameswaram Banaras Express, 06036 and 06035 – Ernakulam Velankanni Express, 07355 and 07356 – Hubli Rameswaram Express, 22613 and 22614 – Shraddha Sethu Express, 20683 and 20684 Tambaram Sengottai Tambaram Triweekly super fast express etc.) Since all of these trains are skipping sivaganga which caused huge inconvenience to many people of Sivaganga District.

Also, the surveys taken by Railway boards are being shelved. New railway routes between Madurai-Melur-Tirupattur-Karaikudi, Dindigul-Natham-Tirupattur-Karaikudi were requested since decades and are shelved, waiting for approvals since long time. New east coast rail route between Karaikudi-Devakottai-Ramanathapuram-Tuticorin-Kanyakumari are being abandoned due to lack of finance.

== See also ==
- Sivaganga
- List of constituencies of the Lok Sabha
