= O. Subramanian =

Indian politician

O. Subramanian is an Indian politician and former 8th Opposition Leader of the Legislative Assembly Tamil Nadu. He was elected to the Tamil Nadu legislative assembly as an Indian National Congress candidate from Sivaganga constituency in 1977 and 1984 elections and as an Indian National Congress (Indira) candidate in 1980 election.
