= Periasamy Thiagarajan =

Indian politician

Member of Parliament, Lok Sabha
- In office 1977–1980
- Preceded by: Kiruttinan
- Succeeded by: R. Swaminathan
- Constituency: Sivaganga, Tamil Nadu

Personal details
- Born: 15 June 1939 Karungulam, Ramnad District, Madras Presidency, British India
- Died: 30 Nov 2008 Sivaganga
- Party: AIADMK
- Other political affiliations: DMK
- Spouse: Shenbagavalli
- Children: Senthilkumar, SriVidya, Subha, Vijayakumar, Bavithra
- Relatives: Vinodkumar.S (grandson), Kaviya.S (granddaughter), Rengarajan.T.V (grandson)

Periasamy Thiagarajan was an Indian politician. He was elected to the Lok Sabha, the lower house of the Parliament of India from Sivaganga, Tamil Nadu as a member of the AIADMK.
