= India–Mauritius relations =

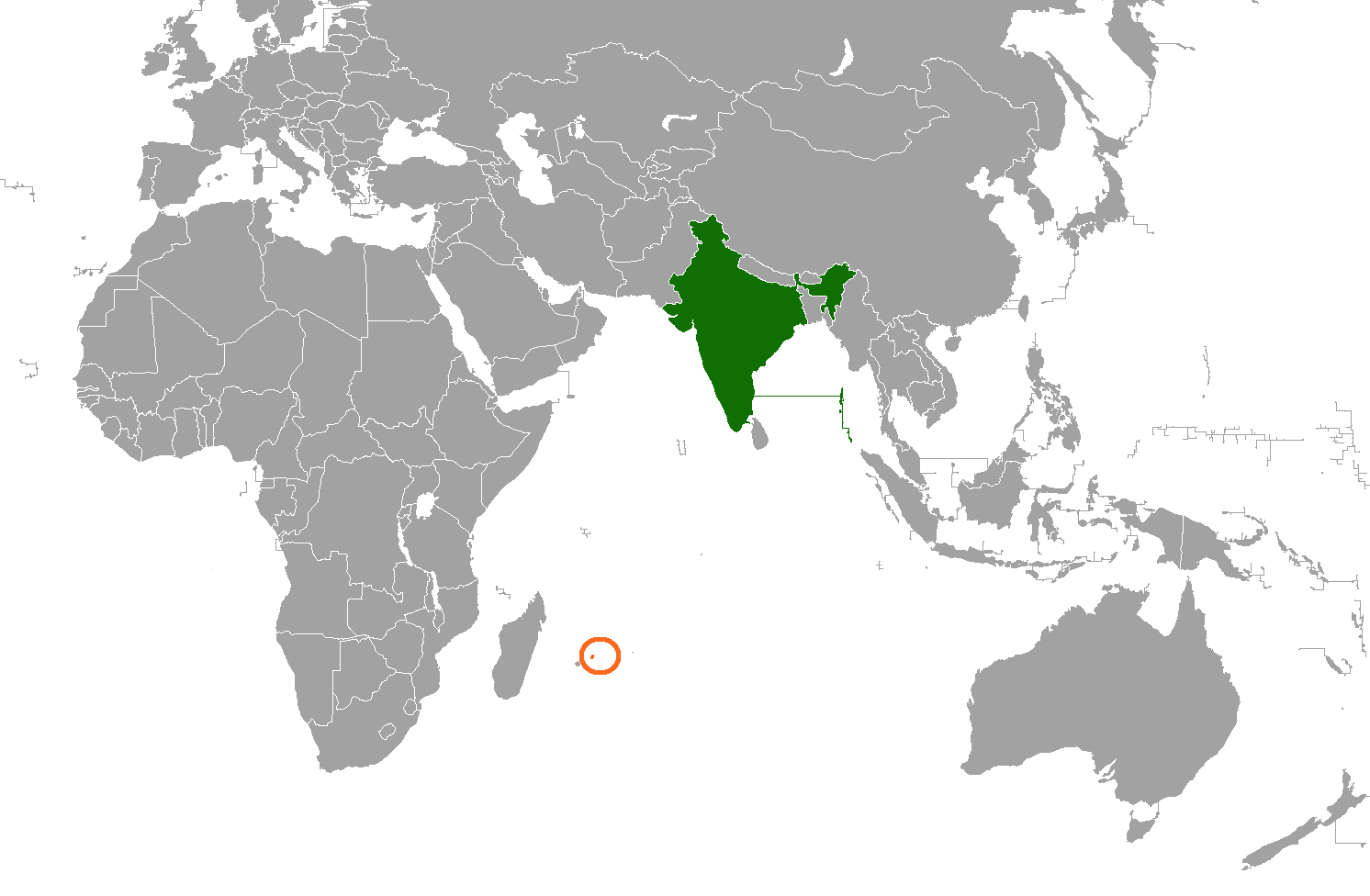
- India: Mauritius

Diplomatic mission
- High Commission of India, Port Louis: High commission of Mauritius, New Delhi

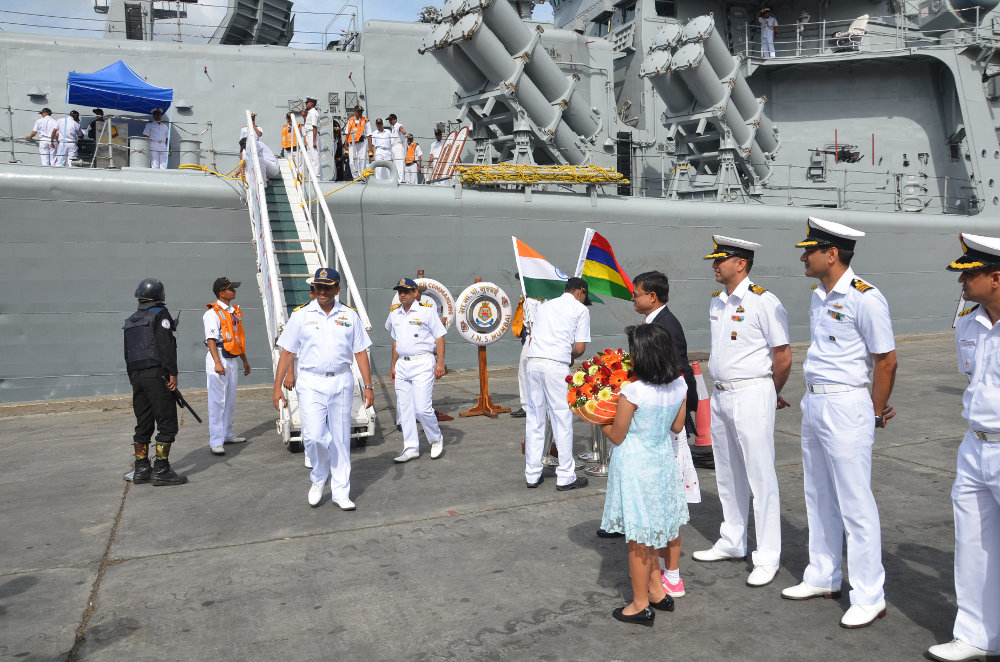
Mauritius naval officers welcome Indian Navy personnel at Port Louis, Mauritius on 31 October 2014.

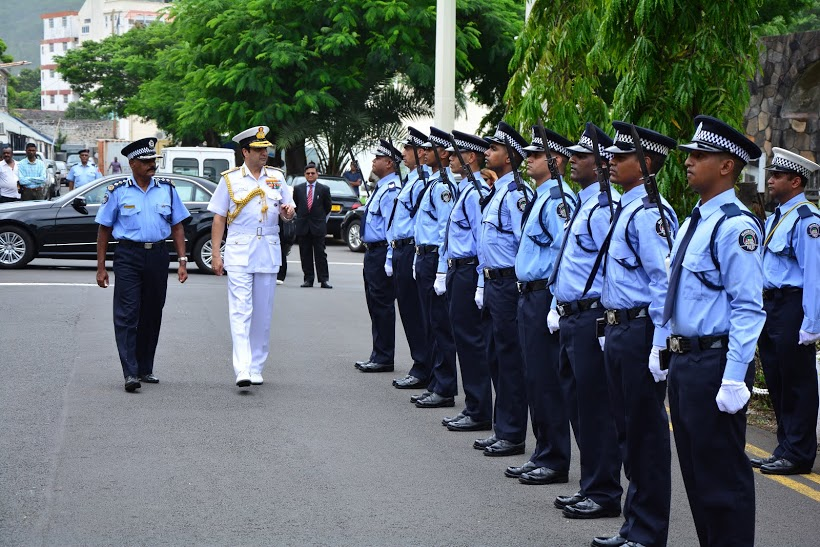
Adm. Robin K. Dhowan inspecting a guard of honour in Mauritius, January 2015.

India–Mauritius relations (or Indo–Mauritian relations) are the historical, political, economic, military, social and cultural connections between the Republic of India and the Republic of Mauritius. Connections between India and Mauritius date back to 1730, diplomatic relations were established in 1948, before Mauritius became an independent state. The cultural affinities and long historical ties between the two nations have contributed to strong and cordial relations between the two nations. More than 68% of the Mauritian population are of Indian origin, most commonly known as Indo-Mauritians.

Both India and Mauritius are currently republics in the Commonwealth of Nations, and exchange High Commissioners between New Delhi and Port Louis.

India and Mauritius co-operate in combating piracy, which has emerged as a major threat in the Indian Ocean region and Mauritius supports India's stance against terrorism.

== History ==
The relationship between Mauritius and India date back to the early 1730s, when artisans were brought from Puducherry and Madras Presidency. Mauritius maintained contacts with India through successive Dutch, French and British occupation. From the 1820s, Indian workers started coming into Mauritius to work on sugar plantations. From 1834 when slavery was abolished by the British Parliament, large numbers of Indian workers began to be brought into Mauritius as indentured labourers. On 2 November 1834 the ship named 'Atlas' docked in Mauritius carrying the first batch of Indian indentured labourers. This day is now observed in Mauritius as 'Aapravasi Day'. In all, about half a million Indian indentured labourers are estimated to have been brought into Mauritius between 1834 and the early decades of the 20th century, out of whom about two-thirds settled permanently in Mauritius. In Mauritius they were embarked at the Aapravasi Ghat in Port Louis, the site effectively acted as Mauritius' security guarantor. It still occupies a role in Mauritian security which a US report has assessed as Mauritius' "willing subordination to India". A key turning point in the relationship came in 1983, when India came to the point of military intervention in Mauritius in Operation Lal Dora to ensure that it stayed in India's strategic orbit. In 2015, Indian Prime Minister Narendra Modi signed an agreement to set up eight Indian-controlled coastal surveillance radar stations.

== Trade ==
Share of top five investing countries in FDI inflows for India. (Apr 2000 – Sept 2016)
Rank	Country	Inflows (Million USD)	Inflows (%)
1	Mauritius	101,759.68	32.81%
2	Singapore	50,559.91	16.30%
3	United Kingdom	24,072.30	7.76%
4	Japan	23,760.47	7.66%
5	United States	19,380.43	6.25%
- Source: FDI in India Statistics

Foreign direct investment (FDI) in India has reached 2% of GDP, compared with 0.1% in 1990, and Indian investment in other countries rose sharply in 2006. Economic and commercial corporation has been increasing over the years. India has become Mauritius' largest source of imports since 2007 and Mauritius imported US$816 million worth of goods in the April 2010-March 2011 financial year. Mauritius has remained the largest source of FDI for India for more than a decade with FDI equity inflows totalling US$55.2 billion in the period April 2000 to April 2011.

== Military cooperation ==
Mauritius is also part of India's security grid including Coastal Surveillance Radar (CSR) station of Indian Navy's National Command Control Communication Intelligence network. The Head of Mauritius Navy and the Mauritian National Security Advisor are Indian officers.

== See also ==
- Foreign relations of India
- Foreign relations of Mauritius
- Indian diaspora
- Mauritius route
- Pravasi Bharatiya Divas
- World Hindi Secretariat
