= Syed Ahmad Hashmi =

Indian Muslim scholar and politician

Mawlana Syed Ahmad Hashmi

MP, Rajya Sabha for Uttar Pradesh
- In office 3 April 1974 – 2 April 1980
- In office 5 July 1980 – 4 July 1986

7th General Secretary of Jamiat Ulama-e-Hind
- In office 11 August 1973 – 28 January 1980
- Preceded by: Asad Madni
- Succeeded by: Asrarul Haq Qasmi

Personal life
- Born: 17 January 1932 Darbhanga, Bihar and Orissa Province, British India
- Died: 4 November 2001 (aged 69) Delhi, India
- Education: Madrasa 'Aliya; Darul Uloom Deoband

Religious life
- Religion: Islam
- Denomination: Sunni Islam
- Jurisprudence: Hanafi

Syed Ahmad Hashmi (17 January 1932 - 4 November 2001) was an Indian Muslim scholar and politician who served as the seventh general secretary of Jamiat Ulama-e-Hind and the chairman of Passenger Amenities Committee. He was a member of the Rajya Sabha, upper house of the Parliament of India representing Uttar Pradesh for two terms.

== Biography ==
Syed Ahmad Hashmi was born on 17 January 1932 in Darbhanga at the house of his maternal grandfather. He was brought up by his brother Syed Muhammad Hashmi, who enrolled him at the Madrasa Dīniya in Ghazipur, where he received his primary education, where he received his primary education from 1940 to 1948. He received his higher education at the Madrasa 'Aliya in Kolkata between 1948 and 1954, and graduated from the Darul Uloom Deoband in 1955. He studied Sahih Bukhari and Jami' al-Tirmidhi with Hussain Ahmad Madani.

Hashmi stayed at Kolkata between 1957 and 1974, and taught there in the madrasa of Anjuman Nidā-e-Islām, and served as the general secretary of the Jamiat Ulama-e-Hind's West Bengal unit. He started two weeklies, Armaghān and Kundan there, and the Government of West Bengal filed a lawsuit against the weekly Armaghan and it was stopped. He was a member of Rajya Sabha, the upper house of the Indian parliament, from 1974 to 1980 and 1980 to 1986. He was appointed the chairman of the Delhi Waqf Board in 1977 and served as the general secretary of the Jamiat Ulama-e-Hind from 1973 to 1980. The JUH also made him the manager of its weekly Al-Jamiat. He was a founder member of the All India Muslim Majlis-e-Mushawarat and served it under the capacity of a vice-president. He was a member of the All India Muslim Personal Law Board and Babri Masjid Action Committee. He was a member and then the chairman of the Passenger Amenities Committee. Later in his life, he dissociated from the Jamiat Ulama-e-Hind, and formed Milli Jamiat Ulama, existence of which remained limited to the paper only.

Hashmi died on 4 November 2001 in Delhi. His funeral prayer was led by Abdul Ghafar, the then senior hadith professor of Madrasa Alia, Fatehpuri.

== See also ==
- List of Deobandis
