= Kulanthai Rani =

Indian politician (born 1971)

Kulanthai Rani. A. (born 1971) is an Indian politician from Tamil Nadu. She is a Member of the Legislative Assembly from Sivaganga Assembly constituency in Sivagangai district representing the Tamilaga Vettri Kazhagam.

Rani is from Sivagangai, Tamil Nadu. She is a graduate.

Rani became an MLA for the first time making a winning debut in the 2026 Tamil Nadu Legislative Assembly election from Sivaganga Assembly constituency representing Tamilaga Vettri Kazhagam. She polled 73,737 votes and defeated her nearest rival, P. R. Senthilnathan of the All India Anna Dravida Munnetra Kazhagam, by a margin of 15,081 votes.
