= G. Baskaran =

Indian politician

Member-Tamil Nadu Legislative Assembly
- In office 2016–2021
- Preceded by: S. Gunasekaran
- Succeeded by: P. R. Senthilnathan
- Constituency: Sivaganga

Personal details
- Born: 15 April 1951 Thamarakki South
- Party: All India Anna Dravida Munnetra Kazhagam
- Profession: Farmer

G. Baskaran is an Indian politician and a former member of the Tamil Nadu Legislative Assembly. He hails from Thamarakki South village in Sivaganga district. Baskaran completed hisg school studies at Sivagangai. He is a functionary of All India Anna Dravida Munnetra Kazhagam (AIADMK) party. He contested and won the Sivaganga Assembly constituency in the 2016 Tamil Nadu Legislative Assembly election and became a Member of the Legislative Assembly.

== Electoral Performance ==
=== 2016 ===
2016 Tamil Nadu Legislative Assembly election: Sivaganga
| Party | Candidate | Votes | % | ±% |
|---|---|---|---|---|
| AIADMK | G. Baskaran | 81,697 | 43.15% | New |
| DMK | M. Sathianathan @ Meppal M. Sakthi | 75,061 | 39.64% | New |
| CPI | S. Gunasekaran | 15,114 | 7.98% | −39.83 |
| All India Forward Bloc (Subhasist) | G. M. Srithar Vandaiyar | 5,214 | 2.75% | New |
| NTK | Kottaikumar Rama | 3,118 | 1.65% | New |
| ETMK | T. Vellaikkannu | 1,809 | 0.96% | New |
| NOTA | NOTA | 1,530 | 0.81% | New |
| PMK | N. Rajasekaran | 1,284 | 0.68% | New |
| GOKMK | M. Kaleeswaran | 981 | 0.52% | New |
| Margin of victory | | 6,636 | 3.50% | 0.72% |
| Turnout | | 189,342 | 69.29% | −4.16% |
| Registered electors | | 273,251 | | |
| AIADMK gain from CPI | | Swing | -4.67% | |
