= E. M. Sudarsana Natchiappan =

Indian politician (1947–2026)

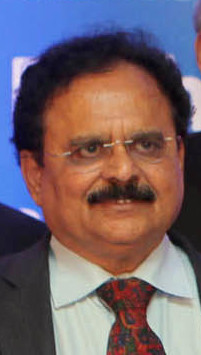

Member of Parliament, Rajya Sabha
- In office 30 June 2004 – 29 June 2016
- Succeeded by: R. Vaithilingam
- Constituency: Tamil Nadu

Minister of State for Commerce and Industry
- In office 17 June 2013 – 26 May 2014
- Prime Minister: Manmohan Singh

Member of Parliament for Sivagangai
- In office 10 October 1999 – 6 Feb 2004
- Preceded by: P. Chidambaram
- Succeeded by: P. Chidambaram

Personal details
- Born: 29 September 1947 Eriyur, Sivagangai district, Madras Province, India
- Died: 17 September 2026 (aged 78)
- Party: Indian National Congress
- Spouse: E. M. S. Devaki
- Education: Thiagarajar College; Dr. Ambedkar Government Law College; Madurai Kamaraj University; Washington University in St. Louis
- Occupation: Lawyer, politician

E. M. Sudarsana Natchiappan (29 September 1947 – 17 September 2026) was an Indian National Congress politician who was a member of parliament, representing Tamil Nadu in the Rajya Sabha.

== Life and career ==
Natchiappan was also elected to the Lok Sabha from Sivaganga constituency as an Indian National Congress candidate in 1999 election. He was Advocate in Supreme Court of India.

He addressed the United Nations General Assembly on two occasions, both in October 2008. Natchiappan was part of the Indian delegation, and gave statements on UN peacekeeping operations and globalisation and independence.

Natchiappan was co-founder and President of the Parliamentarian Forum on Human Rights. The forum is a platform for members of parliament (MPs), cutting across party lines, and catering for the need to discuss and act on human rights violations in the world in general and in India specifically. He became the Union Minister of State for Commerce and Industry from 17 June 2013 till 26 May 2014 in Second Manmohan Singh ministry.

Natchiappan died on 17 September 2026, at the age of 78.

== In Parliament ==
Natchiappan held the following during his tenure as a Member of Parliament for Tamil Nadu:

- Member, Committee on Science and Technology, Environment and Forests (1999–2000)
- Member, Committee on Government Assurances (2000–2004)
- Member, Consultative Committee for the Ministry of Information and Broadcasting (2000–2004)
- Member, Committee on Finance (2002–2004)
- Chairman, Committee on Personnel, Public Grievances, Law and Justice (Aug. 2004 – May 2009)
- Member, General Purposes Committee (Aug. 2005 – May 2009)
- Member, Consultative Committee for the Ministry of Information and Broadcasting (Oct. 2004 – 2008)
- Member, Committee on Rules (Nov. 2004 – Sept. 2010)
- Chairman, Parliamentary Forum on Human Rights, New Delhi (2004–20??)
- Member, Consultative Committee for the Ministry of Finance (2008 – May 2009) and (Aug. 2009 – June 2013)
- Member, Committee on Human Resource Development (Aug. 2009 – Aug. 2011)
- Member, Committee on Commerce (Aug. 2010 – Aug. 2012)
- Member, Committee on Labour (Aug. 2010 – Aug. 2011)
- Member, Select Committee to the Prevention of Torture Bill, 2010 (Aug. 2010 – Dec. 2010)
- Member, Committee on Papers Laid on the Table (Sept. 2010 – May 2013)
- President, Parliamentarian Forum on Human Rights for Global Development, New Delhi (Sept. 2010–20??)
- Nominated to the Panel of Vice-Chairmen, Rajya Sabha (Aug. 2011–20??)
- Member, Joint Parliamentary Committee to examine matters relating to allocation and pricing of telecom licences and spectrum (Nov. 2011 – July 2013)
- Member, Business Advisory Committee (April 2012 – Aug. 2013)
- Member, Committee on Defence (Aug. 2012 – June 2013)
- Member, Committee on Ethics (Dec. 2012 – June 2013)
- Member, Committee on Public Accounts (May 2013 – June 2013)
- Chairman, Committee on Personnel, Public Grievances, Law and Justice (Sept. 2014–20??)
- Member, Business Advisory Committee (Sept. 2014–20??)
- Member, Select Committee on the Payment and Settlement Systems (Amendment) Bill, 2014 (Dec. 2014 – Feb. 2015)
- Member, General Purposes Committee (Jan. 2015–20??)
