= S. Sethuraman =

Indian politician

S. Sethuraman is an Indian politician and former Member of the Legislative Assembly of Tamil Nadu. He was elected to the Tamil Nadu legislative assembly as a Dravida Munnetra Kazhagam candidate from Sivaganga constituency in 1967 and 1971 elections.
