= P. Chidambaram =

Indian politician and lawyer (born 1945)

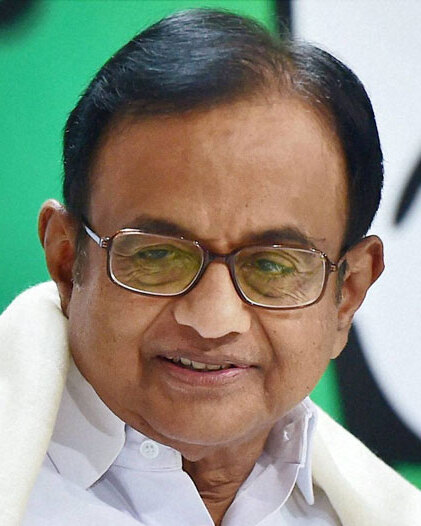

Member of Parliament, Rajya Sabha
- Incumbent
- Assumed office 30 June 2022
- Preceded by: A. Navaneethakrishnan
- Constituency: Tamil Nadu
- In office 5 July 2016 – 16 June 2022
- Preceded by: Vijay J. Darda
- Succeeded by: Imran Pratapgarhi
- Constituency: Maharashtra

Union Minister of Home Affairs
- In office 29 November 2008 – 31 July 2012
- Prime Minister: Manmohan Singh
- Preceded by: Shivraj Patil
- Succeeded by: Sushilkumar Shinde

Union Minister of Finance
- In office 31 July 2012 – 26 May 2014
- Prime Minister: Manmohan Singh
- Preceded by: Pranab Mukherjee
- Succeeded by: Arun Jaitley
- In office 22 May 2004 – 30 November 2008
- Prime Minister: Manmohan Singh
- Preceded by: Jaswant Singh
- Succeeded by: Pranab Mukherjee
- In office 1 May 1997 – 19 March 1998
- Prime Minister: I. K. Gujral
- Preceded by: I. K. Gujral
- Succeeded by: Yashwant Sinha
- In office 1 June 1996 – 21 April 1997
- Prime Minister: H. D. Deve Gowda
- Preceded by: Jaswant Singh
- Succeeded by: I. K. Gujral

Union Minister of Corporate Affairs
- In office 1 June 1996 – 21 April 1997
- Prime Minister: H. D. Deve Gowda
- Preceded by: Jaswant Singh
- Succeeded by: Inder Kumar Gujral

Union Minister of Law and Justice
- In office 1 June 1996 – 29 June 1996
- Prime Minister: H. D. Deve Gowda
- Preceded by: Ram Jethmalani
- Succeeded by: Ramakant Khalap

Union Minister of Commerce & Industry
- In office 10 February 1995 – 3 April 1996
- Prime Minister: P. V. Narasimha Rao
- Preceded by: Pranab Mukherjee
- Succeeded by: P. V. Narasimha Rao

Member of Parliament, Lok Sabha
- In office 17 May 2004 – 18 May 2014
- Preceded by: E. M. Sudarsana Natchiappan
- Succeeded by: P. R. Senthilnathan
- Constituency: Sivaganga
- In office 31 December 1984 – 26 April 1999
- Preceded by: R. Swaminathan
- Succeeded by: E. M. Sudarsana Natchiappan
- Constituency: Sivaganga

Personal details
- Born: Palaniyappan Chidambaram; 16 September 1945 (age 81) Kandanur, Madras Province, British India (now in Tamil Nadu, India)
- Party: Indian National Congress (1972–1996), (2004–present)
- Other political affiliations: Congress Jananayaka Peravai (2001–2004); Tamil Maanila Congress (1996–2001)
- Spouse: Nalini Chidambaram
- Children: Karti Chidambaram (son)
- Parent(s): Father : Palaniyappan Chettiyar; Mother : Lakshmi Aachi
- Education: University of Madras (BSc, LLB); Harvard University (MBA); Loyola College (MA)
- Profession: Senior Advocate Politician

Palaniyappan Chidambaram (born 16 September 1945), better known as P. Chidambaram, is an Indian politician and lawyer, who currently serves as a Member of Parliament, Rajya Sabha. He served as the Chairman of the Parliamentary Standing Committee on Home Affairs from 2017 to 2018. He also served as Interim Deputy Leader of Opposition in Rajya Sabha from 2022 to 2023 under Mallikarjun Kharge.

Chidambaram has served as the Union Minister of Finance four times. Most recently, he held the role for the entirety of the Congress-led United Progressive Alliance government from 2004 to 2014, except for a three-year period as Minister of Home Affairs, during which he oversaw India's domestic security response to the 26/11 terrorist attack in Mumbai. Chidambaram returned as Finance Minister in July 2012, succeeding Pranab Mukherjee, who resigned to become the President of India. He was included in Time 100 list in 2013. He was also the head of Congress Manifesto Committee for the 2019 Lok Sabha Elections and 2024 Indian General Elections.

== Early life and education ==
Chidambaram was born to Kandanur L. Ct. L. Palaniyappan Chettiyar and Lakshmi Aachi at Kanadukathan in the Sivaganga district of Tamil Nadu. His maternal grandfather was Raja Sir Annamalai Chettiar, a wealthy merchant and banker from Chettinad.

Chidambaram did his schooling at the Madras Christian College Higher Secondary School, Chennai. He then passed the one-year Pre-university course from Loyola College, Chennai. After graduating with a BSc degree in Statistics from the Presidency College, Chennai, he completed his Bachelor of Laws from the Madras Law College (Dr. Ambedkar Government Law College) and his MBA from Harvard Business School in the class of 1968. He also holds a Master's degree from Loyola College, Chennai.

During this time, his politics inclined to the left and in 1969 he joined N. Ram, later an editor of The Hindu, and the women's activist Mythili Sivaraman in starting a journal called the Radical Review.

Chidambaram has two brothers and one sister. His father's business interests covered textiles, trading and plantations in India. He chose to concentrate on his legal practice and stayed away from the family business.

Chidambaram enrolled as a lawyer in the Madras High Court, becoming a senior advocate in 1984. He had offices in Delhi and Chennai and practiced in the Supreme Court and various high courts of India.

== Political career ==
Chidambaram was elected to the Lok Sabha (lower house) of the Indian Parliament from the Sivaganga constituency of Tamil Nadu in general elections held in 1984. He was a union leader for MRF and worked his way up in the Congress party. He was the Tamil Nadu Youth Congress president and then the general secretary of the Tamil Nadu Pradesh Congress Committee unit. He was inducted into the Union (Indian federal) Council of Ministers in the government headed by Prime Minister Rajiv Gandhi on 21 September 1985 as a Deputy Minister in the Ministry of Commerce and then in the Ministry of Personnel. His main actions during his tenure in this period was to control the price of tea and he has been criticized by the Government of Sri Lanka for destroying the Sri Lankan tea trade by fixing the prices of the commodity in India using state power. He was elevated to the rank of Minister of State in the Ministry of Personnel, Public Grievances and Pensions in January 1986. In October of the same year, he was appointed to the Ministry of Home Affairs as Minister of State for Internal Security. He continued to hold both offices until general elections were called in 1989. The Indian National Congress government was defeated in the general elections of 1989.

In June 1991, Chidambaram was inducted as a Minister of State (Independent Charge) in the Ministry of Commerce, by the then Prime Minister Mr P V Narasimha Rao; a post he held till July 1992. He was later re-appointed Minister of State (Independent Charge) in the Ministry of Commerce in February 1995 and held the post until April 1996. He made some radical changes in India's export-import (EXIM) policy, while at the Ministry of Commerce.

In 1996, Chidambaram quit the Congress party and joined a breakaway faction of the Tamil Nadu state unit of the Congress party called the Tamil Maanila Congress (TMC). In the general elections held in 1996, TMC along with a few national and regional level opposition parties, formed a coalition government.

=== Ministry of Finance ===
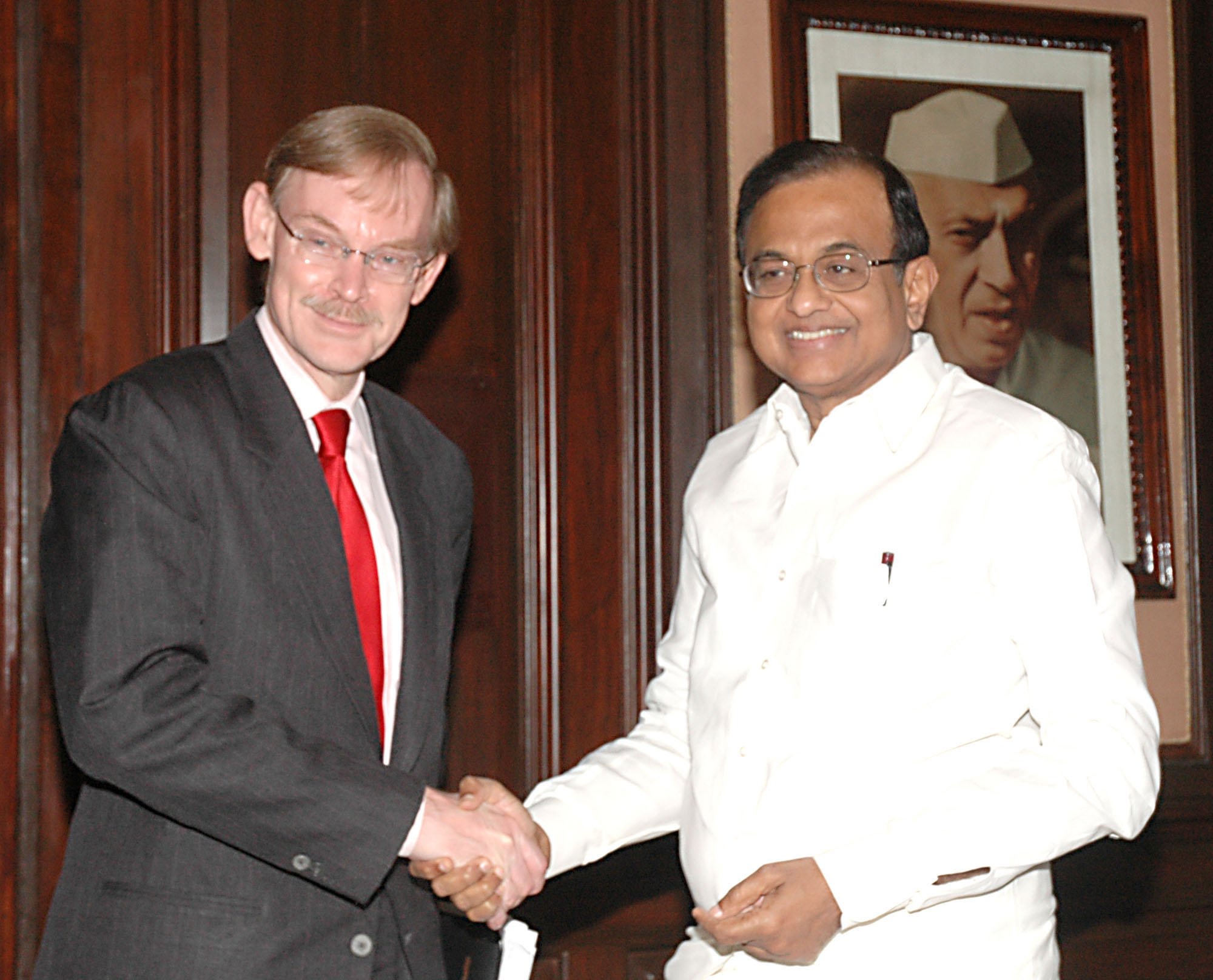
Chidambaram meeting with the 11th President of the World Bank Group Robert Zoellick in New Delhi on November 02, 2007

The coalition government came as a big break for Chidambaram, who was given the key cabinet portfolio of Finance. His 1997 budget is still remembered as the dream budget for the Indian economy. The coalition government was a short-lived one (it fell in 1998), but he was reappointed to the same portfolio in the government formed by Prime Minister Manmohan Singh in 2004.

In 1998, the Bharatiya Janata Party (BJP) took the reins of the government for the first time and it was not until May 2004 that Chidambaram would be back in government. Chidambaram became Minister of Finance again in the Congress party led United Progressive Alliance government on 24 May 2004. During the intervening period Chidambaram made some experiments in his political career, leaving the TMC in 2001 and forming his own party, the Congress Jananayaka Peravai, largely focused on the regional politics of Tamil Nadu. The party failed to take off into mainstream Tamil Nadu or national politics. After the elections of 2004, when the Congress won the election he was inducted into the Council of Ministers under the new Prime Minister Manmohan Singh as cabinet Minister of Finance and he merged his party with the mainstream Congress party.

=== Ministry of Home Affairs ===
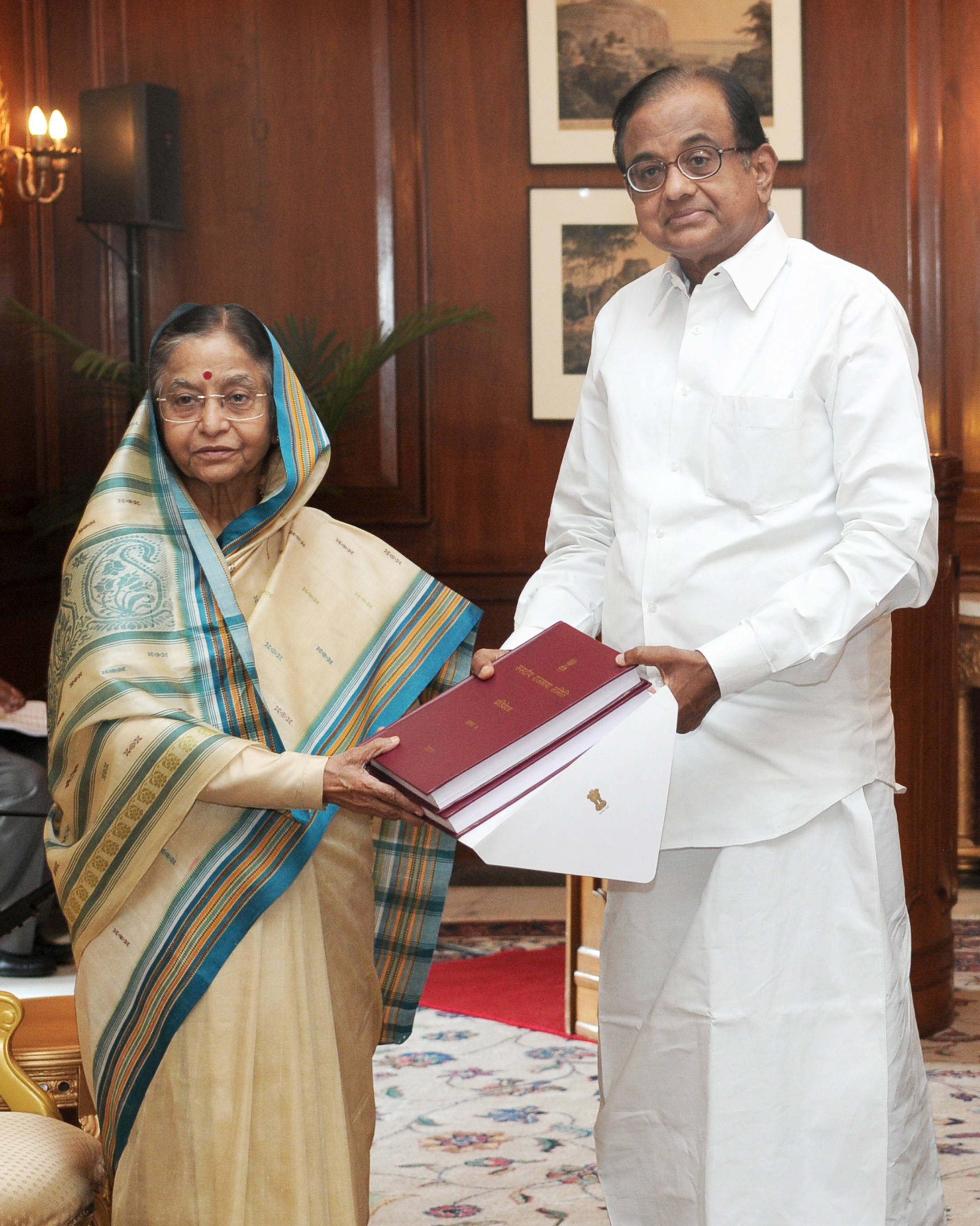
Home Minister Chidambaram presenting ninth part of Report of the Committee of Parliament on Official Language to President of India Pratibha Patil.

On 30 November 2008, he was appointed the Union Home Minister following the resignation of Shivraj Patil who had come under intense pressure to tender his resignation following a series of terror attacks in India, including the Mumbai attacks on 26 November 2008.

He has been credited with taking the bold decision of prioritising elections above corporate demands to deploy security for the 2009 Indian Premier League.

In 2009, Chidambaram was re-elected from the Sivaganga Lok Sabha constituency in the Congress and retained the Home ministry. He was one of the representatives of the central government when a tri-party agreement was signed with the Gorkha Hill Council and the Government of West Bengal, an agreement which was a result of Mamata Banerjee's effort to end a decade long unrest in the hills of Darjeeling.

The Indian National Congress appointed P. Chidambaram as one of thirteen senior spokespersons on 15 September 2014. He ceded his seat to his son Karti in 2014, which resulted in electoral defeat for his son. In 2016, he was elected as an MP of the Rajya Sabha, the upper house of Indian parliament from the state of Maharashtra.

Parliamentary Committee assignments

- 13 September 2021 onwards: Member Committee on External Affairs.

== Elections Contested ==
=== Lok Sabha Elections Contested ===
Year	Constituency	Party	Votes %	Opponent		Votes %	Result	Margin
1984	Sivaganga	INC	68.10	DMK	Tha. Kiruttinan	51.60	Won	16.50
1989	Sivaganga	INC	65.86	DMK	A. Ganesan	32.26	Won	33.60
1991	Sivaganga	INC	67.49	DMK	V. Kasinathan	29.12	Won	38.37
1996	Sivaganga	TMC(M)	64.79	INC	M. Gowri Shankaran	26.53	Won	38.26
1998	Sivaganga	TMC(M)	51.15	AIADMK	K. Kalimuthu	41.19	Won	9.96
1999	Sivaganga	TMC(M)	20.85	INC	E. M. Sudarsana Natchiappan	40.23	Lost	19.38
2004	Sivaganga	INC	60.01	AIADMK	S. P. Karuppiah	35.62	Won	24.39
2009	Sivaganga	INC	43.17	AIADMK	Raja Kannappan	42.74	Won	0.43

=== Rajya Sabha ===
Position	Party	Constituency	From	To	Tenure
Member of Parliament, Rajya Sabha (1st Term)	INC	Maharashtra	5 July 2016	16 June 2022	5 years, 346 days
Member of Parliament, Rajya Sabha (2nd Term)	INC	Tamil Nadu	30 June 2022	29 June 2028	5 years, 365 days

== Positions held ==
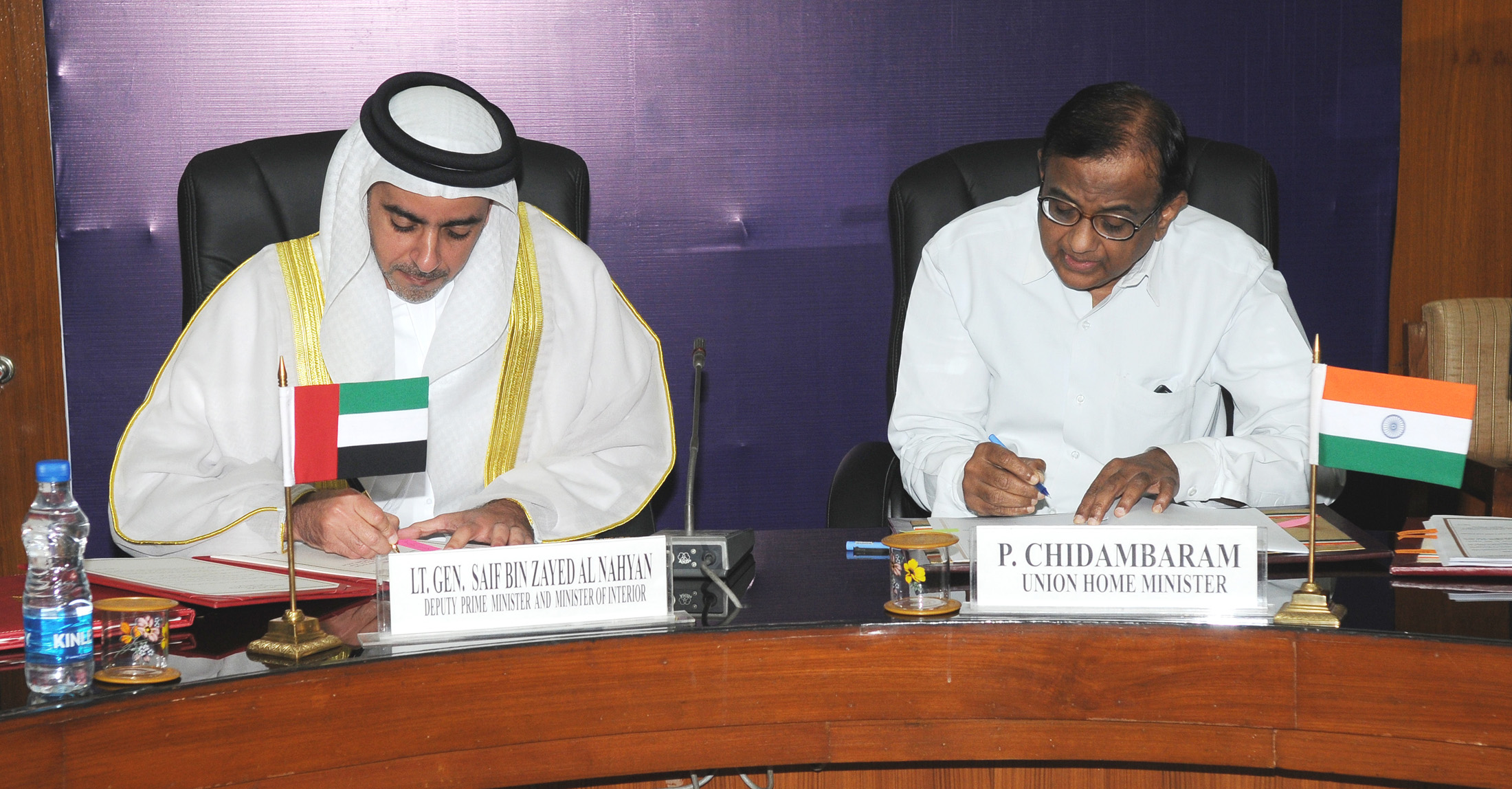
Home Minister Chidambaram with Saif bin Zayed Al Nahyan.

From	To	Position / Role
June 2022	Incumbent	Elected to Rajya Sabha (Second Term) (Constituency: Tamil Nadu); Member, Committee on Finance (Sept. 2022 - Sept. 2023); Member, Committee on Home Affairs (Aug. 2023 - June 2024); Member, Committee on Finance (Sept. 2024 - Incumbent); Member, Consultative Committee for the Ministry of Finance (Oct. 2024 - Incumbent); President, India–Italy Parliamentary Friendship Group (Feb. 2026 - Incumbent)
July 2016	16 June 2022	Elected to Rajya Sabha (Resigned) (Constituency: Maharasthra); Chairman, Committee on Home Affairs (Sept. 2016 - May 2019); Member, General Purposes Committee (March 2017 - Nov. 2019); Member, Committee on External Affairs (Sept. 2019 - June 2022)
2009	2014	Member, Fifteenth Lok Sabha (Seventh Term); Union Cabinet Minister, Home Affairs (23 May 2009 - 31 Jul. 2012); Union Cabinet Minister, Finance (Aug. 2012 - May 2014)
2004	2009	Member, Fourteenth Lok Sabha (Sixth Term); Union Cabinet Minister, Finance (23 May 2004 - Nov. 2008); Union Cabinet Minister, Home Affairs (Dec. 2008 - May 2009)
1998	1999	Member, Twelfth Lok Sabha (Fifth Term); Member, Committee of Privileges; Member, Committee on Finance; Member, Consultative Committee, Ministry of External Affairs
1996	1998	Member, Eleventh Lok Sabha (Fourth Term); Union Cabinet Minister, Finance (with addn. charge of Law, Justice and Company Affairs) (Company Affairs till April 1997)
1991	1996	Member, Tenth Lok Sabha (Third Term); Union Minister of State, Commerce (Independent Charge) (1991-92) (1995-96)
1989	1991	Member, Ninth Lok Sabha (Second Term); Member, Committee to review Lok Sabha Secretariat Rules, 1955 (1990-1990); Member, Public Accounts Committee (1990-91); Member, Consultative Committee, Ministry of Finance (1990-91)
1984	1989	Member, Eighth Lok Sabha (First Term); Union Deputy Minister, Commerce (Sept. 1985 - 1985); Union Minister of State, Home Affairs (Internal Security); Union Deputy Minister, Personnel, Administrative Reforms, Training, Public Grievances and Pensions (1985-89)
1985	1985	Joint Secretary, All India Congress Committee (I)
1976	1977	General-Secretary, Pradesh Congress Committee, Tamil Nadu
1973	1976	President, Youth Congress, Tamil Nadu
1972	1972	Member, All India Congress Committee

== Family and personal life ==
Chidambaram's mother, Lakshmi Acchi, was the daughter of Sir Annamalai Chettiar, a banker and merchant, and was granted the title of Raja by the British. Annamalai Chettiar was the founder of Annamalai University and United India Insurance Company Limited. His brother, Ramaswami Chettiar, was the founder of the Indian Bank and the co-founder of the Indian Overseas Bank.

He is married to Nalini Chidambaram, daughter of Justice (Retd.) Palapatti Sadaya Goundar Kailasam and Mrs. Soundra Kailasam, a renowned Tamil poet and author. Nalini Chidambaram is a senior advocate practising in the Madras High Court and the Supreme Court of India. He has a son, Karti P. Chidambaram, who graduated with a BBA degree from the University of Texas, Austin, and a Masters in Law from the University of Cambridge. Karti, a member of the Congress Party's AICC, is active in Tamil Nadu state politics. Karti is married to Dr. Srinidhi Rangarajan, a well-known Bharathanatyam dancer and medical doctor, working with the Apollo Group of Hospitals in Chennai. Karti and Srinidhi have a daughter, Aditi Nalini Chidambaram.

== Controversies ==
The Voluntary Disclosure of Income Scheme (VDIS) 1997, which he announced when he was Finance Minister with the United Front government, was condemned by the Controller and Auditor General of India as abusive because of the loopholes that made it possible to fudge data to the financial advantage of the confessor.

Chidambaram was criticised for his ministry's failure to prevent the 2011 Mumbai bombings, despite massive investments in security following the 2008 Mumbai attacks. Three years after the 2008 attacks, security preparations were proven to be inadequate with channel breakdown and failures in modernising, procuring, and installing security equipment. Chidambaram defended the agencies under his ministry against the charge of intelligence failure with the response which was later ridiculed by many people in India and its media:

Having no intelligence in this case, however, does not mean that there was a failure on part of the intelligence agencies. There has been no intelligence failure. There was no intelligence warning about 13/7.

Tamil Nadu Chief Minister J.Jayalalithaa wrote to the Chief Election Commissioner in 2011 that data entry operators at Sivaganga had transferred 3,400 votes polled by Kannappan from 11 polling stations in Chidambaram's favour. News reports suggest that on May 16, 2009, the AIADMK candidate Raja Kannappan was declared elected by 3555 votes at 12.30 pm, and the news was also broadcast on television. But in a dramatic reversal a few hours later, P Chidambaram was declared elected by 3354 votes at 4.30 pm, and was confirmed as the winner after a recount at 8.30 pm.

On 7 April 2009, Chidambaram was assaulted by Sikh journalist Jarnail Singh during a press conference in Delhi on the issue of a "clean chit" to Jagdish Tytler. Singh, who wrote for the Hindi daily newspaper Dainik Jagaran was dissatisfied with Chidamabaram's answer to a question on the Central Bureau of Investigation's (CBI) "clean chit" regarding Jagdish Tytler's involvement in the 1984 anti-Sikh riots. It was the first shoe throwing incident in India.

Chidambaram was part of Vedanta's legal team and on its board before becoming finance minister in 2004 [42]. In 2002, a year before UK's Financial Services Authority allowed Sterlite to reconstitute itself as Vedanta Resources Plc, the Enforcement Directorate (ED) served a show-cause notice on three of Chairman Anil Agarwal's family. The notice was a demand that Sterlite directors answer allegations about using their holding companies-Volcan and Twinstar-to avoid paying taxes on forex transactions. It was a polite way of saying there was prima facie evidence, dating back to 1993, that the Agarwals were guilty of money laundering. For seven years the case dragged on in courts as Sterlite employed top lawyers to use every possible delaying tactic. P. Chidambaram argued in Sterlite's defence in a 2003 Bombay High Court case related to the ED's allegations. The following year, Chidambaram found himself appointed non-executive director on the board of Vedanta Resources Plc. And very soon, he became finance minister in UPA 1.

Former Union Minister and Senior Advocate Ram Jethmalani's letter to Chidambaram on 6 December 2013 accused him of acting in collusion with the NDTV and laundering Rs 5000 crores of money through Mauritius route back to India.

In September 2025, Chidambaram revealed that in the aftermath of the 2008 Mumbai terror attacks, the Congress-led UPA government had decided not to retaliate against Pakistan for sponsoring the attack, due to intense international pressure, although they were ready to act. Several BJP leaders condemned the admission and accused the Congress party for being soft on Pakistan, commenting that the statement came too little, too late.

=== INX Media, Aircel-Maxis case ===
In 2006, political leader Dr. Subramanian Swamy alleged that a company controlled by Karti Chidambaram, the son of Minister of Finance P. Chidambaram, received a five-percent share of Aircel to get part of ₹40 billion paid by Maxis Communications for the 74-percent share of Aircel. According to Swamy, Chidambaram withheld Foreign Investment Promotion Board clearance of the deal until his son received the five-percent share in Siva's company. The issue was raised a number of times in Parliament by the opposition, which demanded Chidambaram's resignation. Although Chidambaram and the then ruling Congress government denied the allegations, The Pioneer and India Today reported the existence of documents showing that Chidambaram delayed approval of the foreign direct investment proposal by about seven months. It was alleged that Chidambaram's son, Karti was a direct beneficiary of the 2G spectrum case. His company, Advantage Strategic Consulting had a five per cent stake in Aircel Televentures, even as his father P Chidambaram, as Finance minister, was alleged to have offered FIPB clearance for the Aircel-Maxis deal only if his son's company, Advantage Strategic Consulting, got shares in Aircel Ventures. The Enforcement Directorate is currently investigating his involvement in Aircel deal. In 2012, and, subsequently, in 2016, information of wide-scale corruption by Chidambaram's son Karti Chidambaram and Robert Vadra, with the help of his father's position, including through the Airtel–Maxis deal and the Uttar Pradesh NRHM scam, was unveiled in prominent newspapers and media in India. Simultaneously, Chidambaram and his son Karti have been dogged with allegations of corruption, misuse of position, insider trading and money laundering.

=== Imprisonment ===
On 20 August 2019, the Delhi High Court dismissed both anticipatory bail pleas of Chidambaram in connection with corruption charges in the INX Media case during his tenure as Finance minister in UPA Government. On 21 August, he appeared at the Congress HQ and addressed a press conference stating that he was "not accused"; however, he left the place, and, later, he was arrested by the Central Bureau of Investigation and Enforcement Directorate at his home. On 5 September 2019, Supreme Court dismissed his appeal against rejection of anticipatory bail plea by Delhi High Court. The Special Court ordered Chidambaram to stay in judicial custody in Tihar Jail for 14 days. He was incarcerated for a total of 106 days in Tihar Jail. On 4 December he was granted bail by the supreme court.

== Books, research papers and journals ==
Chidambaram is a published author of several books.

=== Books ===
- Fearless in Opposition: Power and Accountability (Publisher: Rupa Publications India; ISBN 978-8129145291)
- The Watershed Year: Which Way Will India Go (Publisher: Bloomsbury India; ASIN B0CWB4X4JK)
- Standing Guard: A Year in Opposition (Publisher: Rupa Publications India; ISBN 978-8129139627)
- Speaking Truth to Power: My Alternative View (Publisher: Rupa Publications India; ISBN 978-8129151063)
- Undaunted: Saving the Idea of India (Publisher: Rupa Publications India; ISBN 978-9353333737)
- A View from the Outside: Why Good Economics Works for Everyone (Publisher: Penguin India; ISBN 978-0670081165)

== Books featuring Chidambaram ==
- An Agenda for India's Growth: Essays in Honour of P. Chidambaram (Publisher: Academic Foundation; ISBN 978-9332700093)

== See also ==
- Outcome Budget: 2005–06
- 2G spectrum case

Rajya Sabha
Preceded by N/A	Member of Parliament for Rajya Sabha (Maharashtra); 2016 to 2022	Succeeded by N/A
Lok Sabha
Preceded by R. V. Swaminathan	Member of Parliament for Sivaganga; 1984–1999	Succeeded by E. M. Sudarsana Natchiappan
Preceded by E. M. Sudarsana Natchiappan	Member of Parliament for Sivaganga; 2004–2014	Succeeded by P.R. Senthilnathan
Political offices
Preceded by Kamakhya Prasad Singh Deo	Minister of State for Personnel, Public Grievances and Pensions; 1985–1989	Succeeded by Margaret Alva
Preceded by Jaswant Singh	Minister of Finance; 1996–1997	Succeeded by Inder Kumar Gujral
Preceded by Inder Kumar Gujral	Minister of Finance; 1997–1998	Succeeded by Yashwant Sinha
Preceded by Jaswant Singh	Minister of Finance; 2004–2008	Succeeded by Manmohan Singh
Preceded by Shivraj Patil	Minister of Home Affairs; 2008–2012	Succeeded by Sushilkumar Shinde
Preceded by Manmohan Singh	Minister of Finance; 2012–2014	Succeeded by Arun Jaitley
