= Dravida Peravai =

Political party in India

Dravida Peravai (Dravidian Front), is a political party in Puducherry, India. The DP was formed in 1996 by a break-away faction of the Dravida Munnetra Kazhagam. The Party claims to be a "Green" party. The present Party General Secretary is N. Nandhivarman. The DP strives to unite Tamils and impart a scientific outlook for the enrichment of Tamil culture. Despite claiming to be "Green" the Party has fought for national projects like the Indian Rivers Inter-link, the Sethusamudram Shipping Canal Project and the Tenth Degree Canal, an Indo-Thailand joint venture. The DP is concerned about future continental and coastal changes affecting Tamil Nadu and Tamils. The Dravida Peravai supports what they refer to as the "Tamil struggle" in Sri Lanka.

Dravida Peravai is for ensuring gender justice equal-representation for women in all electoral avenues. The party is for enforcing total prohibition in the country. The party wants to end all kinds of gambling, flesh trade, abuses of children and women, bonded labor practices, dowry system, superstition, corruption and criminalization. The General Secretary of the party N.Nandhivarman : Past :1964-1972 : Student DMK Pondicherry State Convenor, 1972 October -1972 December : Founder and First expelled leader in Anna DMK [ Dinamani Tamil daily and many news papers report story ], 1974 : Propaganda Secretary DMK for 1974 Pondicherry Assembly polls, 1974-1978 : Columnist who fought emergency through official organs of DMK, 1978-1992 : Self-imposed political exile, 1978-1992 : Granite Export under Seven Seas Enterprises, Blackstone[ India ] Greenland Exports, XL Rocks, Nirmal Granites, 1994-1996 : Convenor Dravida Ilaingnar Peravai [ Dravida Youth Front] 1996-2015 : General Secretary Dravida Peravai, registered with Election Commission of India, 1998-2004 : Associate Party of Samata Party presided by George Fernandes. The Party described the former Minister of Defence George Fernandes as the "International Torch-bearer of Socialism" in view of his longstanding association with socialist movement. Party also spearheads a movement for separate Union Territory for Karaikal within Indian Union.
