= Passenger Amenities Committee =

Indian Railways organisation

Railway Board
- Type: Government Organisation
- Headquarters: New Delhi, India
- Region served: India
- Members: Nirmala Kishore Bollina, Bichitra Narayan Kalita, Ajay Kumar Yadav, Sunil Ram, Vibhashwani Aswasthi, Richa Pandey Mishra, Girishbhai Raysanghbhai Rajgor, Chottubhai Eknath Patil, Harvind Kohli, Ram Kumar Pahana, Madhusudhana P., G.V Manjunatha, Abhilash Pandey, Rajendra Ashok Phadke, Kailash Laxman Verma, Dilip Kumar Mallick, Tajinder Singh Sran, Bhajan lal Sharma, K RaviChandran, Gotalla Uma Rani, Amol Machindranath Deshmukh, Sunita Dayal, Ashok Kumar Sukla, Geeta Thakur, Abhijit Das Bobby, Rathindra Bose
- Chairperson: P. K. Krishna Das
- Parent organisation: Ministry of Railways through Railway Board
- Website: indianrailways.gov.in

The Passenger Amenities Committee (PAC) is a statutory Organization body under the Ministry of Railways (India), Government of India. It is tasked with grievances of passengers for the ease of railway transport in India. PAC is considered to be one of the classical organizational network for smooth functioning of railways in India.

== Works at Karaikudi Railway station ==
- Replacement of old coaches in Chennai and Coimbatore-bound express trains with new one
- Additional coaches in Chennai – Sengottai Silambu Express.
- Forwarded a proposal for scheduled stop at Karaikudi for the Rameswaram Ayodhya Express.
- Proposal for separate berths for Karaikudi passengers on Chennai-bound express trains.

== People ==
Syed Ahmad Hashmi formerly served as the chairman of the PAC.
