= Mauritius route =

Channel used by foreign investors for India

The Mauritius route is a channel used by foreign investors to invest in India. Mauritius is the main provider of foreign direct investment (FDI) to India and also the preferred jurisdiction for Indian outward investments into Africa. In fact 39.6% of FDI to India came from Mauritius between 2001 and 2011.

== Business organisations of Mauritius investing in India ==
Nine of the 10 largest foreign business organisations or companies investing in India (from April 2000 to January 2011) are based in Mauritius. List of the ten largest foreign companies investing in India (from April 2000 to January 2011) are as follows:

1. TMI Mauritius Ltd. – ₹72.94 billion ($1,600 million)
2. Cairn UK Holding – ₹66.63 billion ($1,492 million)
3. Oracle Global (Mauritius) Ltd. – ₹48.05 billion ($1,083 million)
4. Mauritius Debt Management Ltd. – ₹38 billion ($956 million)
5. Vodafone Mauritius Ltd. – ₹32.68 billion ($801 million)
6. Etisalat Mauritius Ltd. – ₹32.28 billion
7. CMP Asia Ltd. – ₹26.38 billion ($653.74 million)
8. Oracle Global Mauritius Ltd. – ₹25.8 billion / $563.94 million)
9. Merrill Lynch(Mauritius) Ltd. – ₹22.3 billion / $483.55 million)
10. Name of the company not given (but the Indian company which got the FDI is Dhabol Power company Ltd.)

== Financial services sector ==
Since the inception of its financial services sector, Mauritius has taken all appropriate steps to safeguard the credibility of its jurisdiction. Mauritius has a stringent legal and regulatory framework recognised by the International Monetary Fund, Financial Stability Board and the Organisation for Economic Co-operation and Development (OECD) to combat money laundering. Furthermore, Mauritius appears on the OECD White List of Jurisdictions that have substantially implemented the internationally agreed tax standards. A recent peer review of Mauritius by the OECD Global Forum, further upholds that Mauritius has all the essential elements in place for an effective exchange of accounting, banking, and ownership/identity information with other countries. Mauritius has enacted necessary legislation to comply with norms prescribed by International Organization of Securities Commissions, Iowa Interstate Railroad, Financial Action Task Force on Money Laundering and the Basel Committee on Banking Supervision. In this regard, the Mutual Assistance in Criminal and Related Matters Act and the Financial Intelligence and Anti-Money Laundering Act 2002 which provides a framework for exchange of information on money laundering with members of international financial intelligence groups are cases in point. The Asset Recovery Act was promulgated to enlarges the scope for freezing ill-gotten assets.

== Double Taxation Avoidance Agreement (DTAA) ==
India has comprehensive Double Taxation Avoidance Agreements (DTAAs) with 88 countries. This means that there are agreed rates of tax and jurisdiction on specified types of income arising in a country to a tax resident of another country. Under the Income Tax Act 1961 of India, there are two provisions, Section 90 and Section 91, which provide specific relief to taxpayers to save them from double taxation. Section 90 is for taxpayers who have paid the tax to a country with which India has signed DTAA, while Section 91 provides relief to tax payers who have paid tax to a country with which India has not signed a DTAA. Thus, India gives relief to both kind of taxpayers.

According to the tax treaty between India and Mauritius, capital gains can only be taxed in Mauritius, the same treaty exist with 16 other countries. Thanks to its low 3% capital gains tax, quality regulatory framework, professional labour, geographical proximity, cultural affinities, and historical ties with India, Mauritius is the most attractive conduit for investments into India.

The DTAC has helped Mauritius in developing its financial services industry while India has benefitted through FDI and job creation.

== Indian press ==
=== Suspicion ===
According to various Indian press, the DTAA are being misused by investors to avoid paying taxes by routing investments through various countries which has tax treaty with India, in particular Mauritius and Singapore, which account for 48% of FDI inflow to India.

== See also ==
- India–Mauritius relations
- General Anti-Avoidance Rule (India)
