= Poovanthi =

Village in Tamil Nadu, India

Poovanthi is a small village in the Sivaganga district of Tamil Nadu, India. Poovanthi is under the Manamadurai assembly constituency and Sivagangai Lok Sabha constituency. The primary source of income is agriculture.

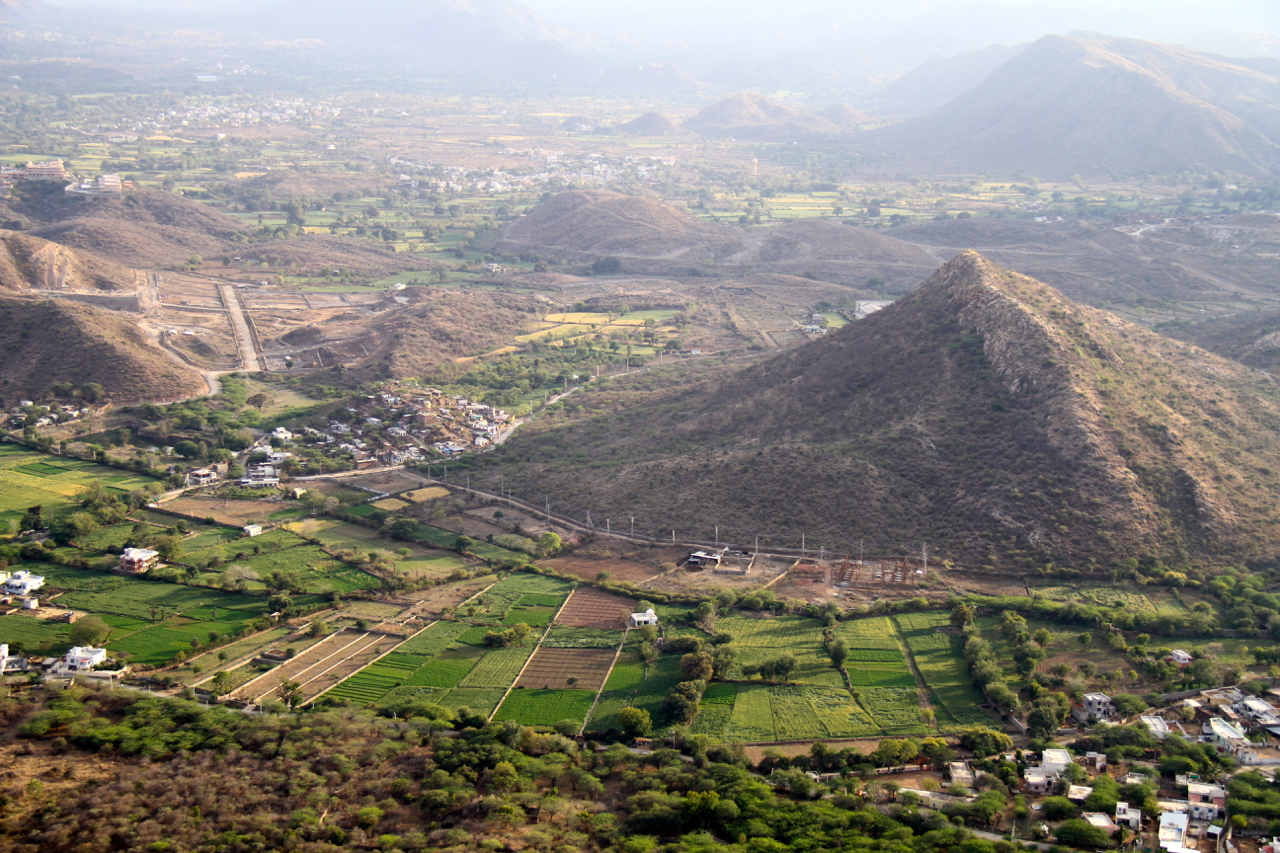
A typical rural peasant Indian village

== History ==
The kings of Sivaganga regularly visited Madurai. The Maruthu Pandiyar brothers, who ruled Sivaganga, visited the Meenakshi Amman Temple in Madurai daily. At Kalaiyar Kovil, The Marudhu Pandiyar brothers built the Shiva temple. Keezhadhi is located on the southern bank of the Vaigai River.

== Kottai Poovanthi ==
Kottai Poovanthi is in ruins and consists of only a few houses. The remains of the fort and Akali can be found. Some Muthumakkal Thali and some statues of deities were found near Kottai Poovanthi.

== See also ==
- Thirupuvanam
