= P. R. Senthilnathan =

Indian politician

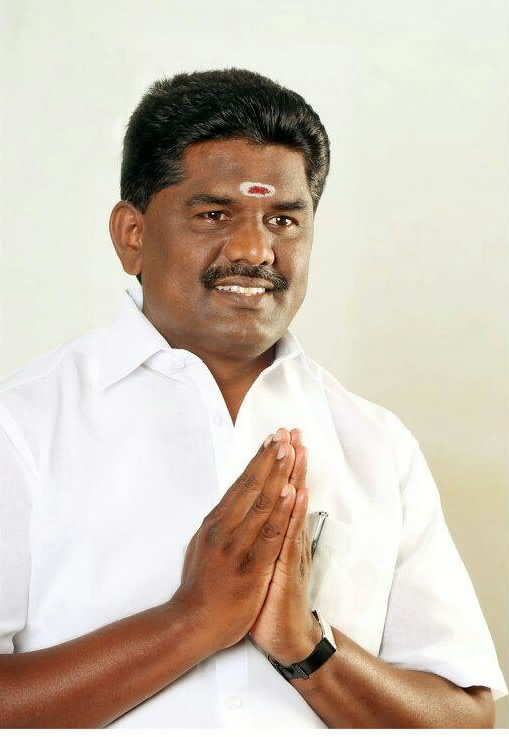

Member of the Tamil Nadu Legislative Assembly
- In office 12 May 2021 – 10 May 2026
- Preceded by: G. Baskaran
- Succeeded by: Kulanthai Rani
- Constituency: Sivaganga

Member of Parliament, Lok Sabha
- In office 1 September 2014 – 23 May 2019
- Preceded by: P. Chidambaram
- Succeeded by: Karti Chidambaram
- Constituency: Sivaganga

Personal details
- Born: 1968 (age 57–58) Nagadi, Sivaganga District, Tamil Nadu
- Party: All India Anna Dravida Munnetra Kazhagam
- Parent: Pereyappa (father)
- Occupation: Politician

P. R. Senthilnathan (born 1968) is a politician from Tamil Nadu. He was born in Nagadi village in the Sivaganga district. He studied at Sevugan Annamalai college in Devakottai. After finishing his B.Sc. he went to Bengaluru to study for an LL.B. degree in Bengaluru University. He started out as a lawyer and became well known for his good skills. He entered politics in 1988 by joining AIADMK. He made a small beginning in the party as its Nagadi branch secretary in 1992 and served as district secretary of Amma Peravai between 2007 and 2013. He was appointed Sivaganga district secretary of AIADMK in April 2013, and Chairman of Tamil Nadu Backward Classes and economic development corporation in June 2013.

In 2014 he was announced as Sivaganga Loksabha candidate by the Party Head Honourable Chief Minister Jayalalithaa. With a difference of 229,385 votes in the 2014 Loksabha election he defeated H. Raja, the Tamil Nadu BJP Vice President and Karthi P. Chidambaram, (son of P. Chidambaram, the country's former Finance Minister), winning his party the election for the first time in 34 years in Sivaganga constituency.

In 2021, he contested from AIADMK in Sivaganga Assembly constituency seat in the State Assembly, and won with a margin of ~11,500 votes.

Preceded by P. Chidambaram	Member of 16th Lok Sabha for Sivaganga; 2014–2019	Succeeded by Karti Chidambaram
