= S. Gunasekaran (Communist Party of India politician) =

Indian politician (born 1955)

S. Gunasekaran (born 21 December 1955) is an Indian politician and a former Member of the Legislative Assembly of Tamil Nadu from Sivaganga constituency.

== Personal life ==
S. Gunasekaran was born in Madurai on 21 December 1955. He is married with three children and has been State President of the Tamil Nadu Farmers Association.

== Politics ==
Gunasekaran is a former member of Sivaganga Municipality and Sivaganga Panchayat. He has also been District Secretary for the Communist Party of India (CPI).

Gunasekaran was first elected to the Tamil Nadu Legislative Assembly as a CPI candidate from the Sivaganga constituency in the 2006 elections. This was despite complications caused by a rebel Indian National Congress politician, V. Rajasekaran, who stood as an independent when his party chose to ally with the CPI in the constituency rather than field its own candidate. Rajasekaran gained significant support from other disaffected INC members during the campaign but Gunasekaran had support from the Dravida Munnetra Kazhagam (DMK).

With support from the All India Anna Dravida Munnetra Kazhagam (AIADMK), Gunasekaran was re-elected from the Sivaganga constituency in the next elections, in 2011. However, both the AIADMK and DMK fielded candidates in the 2016 elections, when Gunasekaran lost the seat to G. Baskaran of the AIADMK. On that occasion, he was the CPI candidate in an alliance involving support from the People's Welfare Front, the Tamil Maanila Congress and the Desiya Murpokku Dravida Kazhagam.

On 13 April 2017, Gunasekaran staged a three-hour fast in Tirupur in protest against officials who were refusing to implement a welfare scheme he was supporting.
