= Congress Jananayaka Peravai =

Congress Jananayaka Peravai Congress Democratic Front
- General Secretary: P. Chidambaram
- Founder: P. Chidambaram
- Founded: 2001
- Split from: Tamil Maanila Congress in 2001
- Merged into: Indian National Congress in 2004

Congress Jananayaka Peravai (Congress Democratic Front) previously known as (Tamil Maanila Congress Jananayaka Peravai) (or) (T.M.C Jananayaka Peravai) was a political party in the Indian state of Tamil Nadu. It was founded in 2001 by former union finance minister P. Chidambaram, as a splinter group of the Tamil Maanila Congress, when the TMC allied itself with the All India Anna Dravida Munnetra Kazhagam. 2001 Tamil Nadu Legislative Assembly election P. Chidambaram other side Party DMK-BJP (NDA) Joint Meet to Assembly election.

In the 2004 Lok Sabha elections Chidambaram ran as the Indian National Congress candidate from Sivagangai, and won with 400 393 votes (60,01%).

On 25 November 2004 CJP merged into the Indian National Congress. Discussions about a merger had taken place during a long time, but the merger was resisted by the Tamil Nadu Congress leadership. In the end the merger was pushed through by the national Congress leadership.

== See also ==
- Indian National Congress breakaway parties
