= Foreign Investment Promotion Board =

National agency in India

The Foreign Investment Promotion Board (FIPB) was a national agency of Government of India, with the remit to consider and recommend foreign direct investment (FDI) which does not come under the automatic route. India attract net inward foreign direct investment amounting to US$30.76 billion during the fiscal year ended March 2014, a 14.13% increase compared to the previous fiscal year. acted as a single window clearance for proposals on foreign direct investment (FDI) in India. The Foreign Investment Promotion Board (FIPB) was housed in the Department of Economic Affairs, Ministry of Finance. FIPB was abolished on 24 May 2017, as announced by Finance Minister Arun Jaitley during 2017-2018 budget speech in Lok Sabha.

== Members ==
- Secretary, Department of Economic Affairs - Chairman
- Secretary, Department of Industrial Policy & Promotion - Member
- Secretary, Department of Commerce - Member
- Secretary, (Economic Relation), Ministry of External Affairs - Member

The Board is empowered to co-opt Secretaries to the Government of India and other top officials of financial institutions, banks and professional experts of industry and commerce, as required.

== Process ==
In a significant move aimed at expediting flow of foreign investment into the country, the Union Cabinet liberalised the FDI policy further by allowing the FIPB to clear proposals from overseas entities worth up to ₹30 billion, against the existing limit of ₹12 billion.

Recommendations of FIPB for proposals up to ₹30 billion are approved by Minister of Finance. While recommendations for proposals of more than ₹3000 crore need to be approved by Cabinet Committee on Economic Affairs (CCEA).

== Aircel-Maxis deal controversy ==
Former Minister of Law and Justice & 2G spectrum case petitioner Dr Subramanian Swamy alleged that in 2006, a company controlled by then Minister of Finance P Chidambaram's son Karti got five per cent stake in Sivasankaran's Aircel to get part of ₹40 billion that the Maxis Communications paid for 74 per cent stake in Aircel. He alleged that Mr Chidambaram withheld the FIPB clearance to the deal till his son got the five per cent shares in Siva's company. Subsequently, the issue was raised on multiple times in Parliament of India by the opposition which demanded resignation of Mr P Chidambaram. He and the government denied all the allegations. According to The Pioneer and India Today reports, documents show that approval to the FDI proposal was indeed delayed about 7 months by P Chidambaram.

== See also ==
- Investment promotion agency
