= Tha. Kiruttinan =

Indian politician

Pasumpon Thandavan Krishnan

Member of Parliament, Lok Sabha
- In office 1967-77
- Succeeded by: Periasamy Thiagarajan
- Constituency: Sivaganga,

Member of Parliament, Rajya Sabha
- In office 1989-96
- Preceded by: Jayalalithaa
- Constituency: Tamil Nadu

Minister for Highways in Tamil Nadu
- In office 1996-2001
- Constituency: Sivaganga (State Assembly Constituency)

Personal details
- Born: 10 February 1937 Kombukkaranendal, Sivaganga, Madras Presidency, British India
- Died: 20 May 2003 (aged 66) Madurai
- Party: Dravida Munnetra Kazhagam
- Spouse: Padma
- Children: 1 son and 1 daughter

Pasumpon Tha Krishnan (10 October 1937 – 20 May 2003) is an Indian politician from the Dravida Munnetra Kazhagam party of Tamil Nadu. He is the State's incumbent Minister of Highway 1996. 2001. He has been representing the Sivaganga constituency in the Tamil Nadu Legislative Assembly since 1996

Krishnan was born on 10 October 1937 at Kombukkaranendal village, Tamil Nadu, in 1937. He was educated at Raja Dorai Singam Memorial College in Sivaganga and at Pachaiyappa's College, Madras. An agriculturalist by occupation, Krishnan became involved in social work as the secretary of the Red Cross Society in his native village. He took a keen interest in serving the poor and otherwise disadvantaged and was arrested on several occasions in connection with various agitations in favour of the people of Tamil Nadu.

Krishnan was chairman of the Panchayat Union in Manamadurai from 1970 to 1976 and president of Theethanpettai village panchayat from 1970 to 1976.

Krishnan was elected to the Fourth Lok Sabha in 1967-1971 and to the Fifth Lok Sabha in 1971-1977, on both occasions from the Sivanganga parliamentary constituency. Thereafter, in 1996, he was elected from Sivaganga state assembly constituency to the Tamil Nadu Legislative Assembly as a Dravida Munnetra Kazhagam (DMK) candidate.

Krishnan was Minister of State Highways and Ports in the Government of Tamil Nadu from 1998 to 2001.

Krishnan was murdered on 20 May 2003. He was hacked to death near his K. K. Nagar residence on 20 May 2003. Several arrests were made and when the DMK came to power in Tamil Nadu in 2006, the case was transferred to Chittoor in Andhra Pradesh after the All India Anna Dravida Munnetra Kazhagam (AIADMK) sought intervention by the Supreme Court of India. The AIADMK said that a fair trial might not be possible in a Tamil Nadu court because the primary accused, M. K. Alagiri, was the son of Karunanidhi, by then the DMK Chief Minister. Alagiri and his co-accused were found not guilty in 2008 due to lack of evidence.
