= T. M. Rangarajan =

Indian politician

Member-Tamil Nadu Legislative Assembly
- In office 1991–1994
- Preceded by: V. Balasubramaniyan
- Succeeded by: N. Ganapathy
- Constituency: Mylapore

Personal details
- Born: 24 February 1947 Mannargudi
- Party: All India Anna Dravida Munnetra Kazhagam
- Profession: Advocate

T. M. Rangarajan is an Indian politician and a former member of the Tamil Nadu Legislative Assembly. He hails from Mannargudi town in Thiruvarur district. Rangarajan, completed his Master of Science and Bachelor of Law degrees and practicing as an advocate. Belonging to the All India Anna Dravida Munnetra Kazhagam (AIADMK) party, he contested and won the Mylapore Assembly constituency in the 1991 Tamil Nadu Legislative Assembly election to become a Member of the Legislative Assembly.

== Electoral performance ==
=== 1991 ===
1991 Tamil Nadu Legislative Assembly election: Mylapore
Party	Candidate	Votes	%	±%
AIADMK	T. M. Rangarajan	62,845	59.31%	+33.78
DMK	Nirmala Suresh	36,149	34.12%	−6.76
BJP	G. Kumaravelu	3,950	3.73%	New
PMK	G. Balasubramaniam	1,335	1.26%	New
JP	G. N. Sridharan	920	0.87%	New
Margin of victory		26,696	25.20%	9.85%
Turnout		105,954	54.40%	−15.07%
Registered electors		197,453		
AIADMK gain from DMK		Swing	18.43%	
