= Mylapore Assembly constituency =

State Legislative Assembly Constituency in Tamil Nadu

Coordinates: 13.040°N 80.270°E

Mylapore
- Constituency No. 25 for the Tamil Nadu Legislative Assembly

Constituency details
- Country: India
- Region: South India
- State: Tamil Nadu
- District: Chennai
- Lok Sabha constituency: Chennai South
- Established: 1951
- Total electors: 1,99,496
- Reservation: None

Member of Legislative Assembly
- 17th Tamil Nadu Legislative Assembly
- Incumbent P. Venkataramanan
- Party: TVK
- Elected year: 2026

Mylapore is a legislative assembly constituency of the Indian state of Tamil Nadu. It is a historic urban seat in the Chennai district, in existence since 1951, and is listed at number 25 amongst the state's 234 assembly constituencies. It includes its namesake Chennai locality Mylapore and surrounding areas such as Alwarpet, Raja Annamalaipuram, Foreshore Estate, Santhome, Mandaveli, Nandanam, and parts of Teynampet. The constituency is generally considered a cultural hub, hosting a diverse population.

The famous Kapaleeshwarar temple, Santhome Cathedral Basilica, the Lighthouse and southern stretches of the Marina Beach are situated in this constituency. During Indian general elections, the Mylapore constituency is a part of the larger Chennai South constituency that sends a Member of Parliament (MP) to the Lok Sabha. The current Member of Legislative Assembly (MLA) representing Mylapore is P. Venkataramanan of the TVK.

== Overview ==
=== Boundaries ===
As per orders of the Delimitation Commission, the Mylapore assembly constituency consists of seven wards of the Greater Chennai Corporation: wards 121, 122, 123, 124, 125 and 126 from the ninth zone (Teynampet) and ward 173 from the 13th zone (Adyar). This composition brings the focal neighbourhood of Mylapore, and its environs Alwarpet, Raja Annamalaipuram, Foreshore Estate, Santhome, Mandaveli, and Nandanam in a single constituency, alongside some parts of Teynampet. The constituency is bound by the Adyar river in the south, the Marina Beach in the east, and the Mount Road in the west. The Buckingham Canal traverses north-east to south-west through the constituency.

=== Character ===
The constituency is entirely urban, situated at the heart of Chennai. It is a mix of affluent neighbourhoods, working-class settlements, commercial areas, and religious establishments. It stretches all the way from the upscale streets of Boat Club in the east to the impoverished fishing hamlets (kuppam) dotting the seashore, and from the backwater estuary of Adyar in the south to the dense streets of interior Chennai. Amidst its posh residential areas, pockets of slums and housing board townships are also found. The constituency hosts various temples and churches, making it a culturally vibrant seat. Examples include the Kapaleeshwarar Temple, Mundaka Kanni Amman Temple, Thiruvalluvar Temple, Ramakrishna Math, Luz Church,Santhome Cathedral etc.

Hindus are the majority of the voters, with the Brahmin sect having a dominant presence in the central parts of the constituency. Elsewhere, Christians, Backward Class Hindus and Scheduled Castes form a voting bloc. Muslims also have a considerable presence. Following the 2026 Special Intensive Revision (SIR) of electoral rolls, the total number of voters in Mylapore is 1,94,731, where female voters outnumber men by around 4 percent.

The issues raised by the voters of Mylapore constituency are mainly civic, such as water logging during rains, flood-prone banks of the Buckingham Canal, land waste management, slum clearance, and traffic congestion.

== Members of Legislative Assembly ==
Year	Member	Political party
Madras State
1952	C. R. Ramaswamy	Indian National Congress
1957	C. R. Ramaswamy	Indian National Congress
1962	Arangannal	Dravida Munnetra Kazhagam
1967	Arangannal	Dravida Munnetra Kazhagam
Tamil Nadu
1971	T. N. Anandanayaki	Indian National Congress
1977	T. K. Kapali	Dravida Munnetra Kazhagam
1980	T. K. Kapali	All India Anna Dravida Munnetra Kazhagam
1984	B. Valarmathi	All India Anna Dravida Munnetra Kazhagam
1989	N. Ganapathy	Dravida Munnetra Kazhagam
1991	T. M. Rangarajan	All India Anna Dravida Munnetra Kazhagam
1994^	V. Balasubramaniyan	All India Anna Dravida Munnetra Kazhagam
1996	N. P. Ramajayam	Dravida Munnetra Kazhagam
2001	K. N. Lakshmanan	Bharatiya Janata Party
2006	S. V. Shekar	All India Anna Dravida Munnetra Kazhagam
2006	S. V. Shekar	Independent
2006	S. V. Shekar	Indian National Congress
2011	R. Rajalakshmi	All India Anna Dravida Munnetra Kazhagam
2016	R. Nataraj	All India Anna Dravida Munnetra Kazhagam
2021	Dha. Velu	Dravida Munnetra Kazhagam
2026	P. Venkataramanan	Tamilaga Vettri Kazhagam

== Polls ==
Vote share of winning candidates
2026	46.53%
2021	44.95%
2016	43.67%
2011	56.03%
2006	42.62%
2001	51.09%
1996	67.25%
1994 by-election	0.0 %
1991	59.31%
1989	40.88%
1984	51.68%
1980	49.66%
1977	33.75%
1971	55.01%
1967	57.02%
1962	40.24%
1957	52.63%
1952	38.82%

=== 2026 ===
2026 Tamil Nadu Legislative Assembly election: Mylapore
Party	Candidate	Votes	%	±%
TVK	Venkataramanan. P	70,070	46.53	New
DMK	Velu. Dha	41,098	27.29	▼17.66
BJP	Dr. Tamilisai Soundararajan	32,328	21.47	New
NTK	Arun. R.L	4,499	2.99	▼3.66
NOTA	NOTA	770	0.51	▼0.34
Margin of victory		28,972	19.24	▲10.94
Turnout		1,50,594	75.49	▲19.25
Registered electors		1,99,496		▼71,040
TVK gain from DMK		Swing	▲46.53	

=== 2021 ===
2021 Tamil Nadu Legislative Assembly election: Mylapore
Party	Candidate	Votes	%	±%
DMK	Dha. Velu	68,392	44.95	New
AIADMK	R. Nataraj	55,759	36.65	−7.02
MNM	Sripriya	14,904	9.80	New
NTK	K. Mahalakshmi	10,124	6.65	+5.15
NOTA	NOTA	1,287	0.85	−1.58
AMMK	D. Karthick	1,118	0.73	New
Margin of victory		12,633	8.30	−1.13
Turnout		152,143	56.24	−3.13
Rejected ballots		213	0.14	
Registered electors		270,536		
DMK gain from AIADMK		Swing	1.29	

=== 2016 ===
2016 Tamil Nadu Legislative Assembly election: Mylapore
Party	Candidate	Votes	%	±%
AIADMK	R. Nataraj	68,176	43.67	−12.37
INC	Karate R. Thiagarajan	53,448	34.23	−1.36
BJP	K. Nagarajan	11,720	7.51	+2.67
PMK	N. Suresh Kumar	5,806	3.72	New
TMC(M)	A. S. Munavar Basha	4,753	3.04	New
NOTA	NOTA	3,788	2.43	New
NTK	S. Sudhakar	2,356	1.51	New
Independent	H. Sathyaa Durrairaj	1,764	1.13	New
Independent	Traffic Ramaswamy	1,229	0.79	New
Independent	S. Sathyanarayanan @ Mylai Shathya	1,017	0.65	New
Margin of victory		14,728	9.43	−11.01
Turnout		156,132	59.37	−6.98
Registered electors		262,980		
AIADMK hold		Swing	-12.37	

=== 2011 ===
2011 Tamil Nadu Legislative Assembly election: Mylapore
Party	Candidate	Votes	%	±%
AIADMK	R. Rajalakshmi	80,063	56.03	+13.42
INC	K. V. Thangkabalu	50,859	35.60	New
BJP	Vanathi Srinivasan	6,911	4.84	New
Loktantrik Samajwadi	R. Ashok Rajendran	1,340	0.94	New
Margin of victory		29,204	20.44	19.31
Turnout		215,350	66.35	3.71
Registered electors		142,882		
AIADMK hold		Swing	13.42	

=== 2006 ===
2006 Tamil Nadu Legislative Assembly election: Mylapore
Party	Candidate	Votes	%	±%
AIADMK	S. Ve. Shekher	62,794	42.62	−3.41
DMK	D. Napoleon	61,127	41.49	New
LKPT	Santhana Gopalan	9,436	6.40	New
DMDK	V. N. Rajan	7,441	5.05	New
JP	V. S. Chandralekha	2,898	1.97	New
Independent	V. Narayanan (Americai)	1,961	1.33	New
Margin of victory		1,667	1.13	−3.93
Turnout		147,345	62.63	21.28
Registered electors		235,246		
AIADMK gain from BJP		Swing	-8.47	

=== 2001 ===
2001 Tamil Nadu Legislative Assembly election: Mylapore
Party	Candidate	Votes	%	±%
BJP	K. N. Lakshmanan	60,996	51.09	+46.65
AIADMK	V. Maitreyan	54,949	46.03	+22.47
Independent	J. Mohan Raj	882	0.74	New
Tamil Nadu People's Party	Dr. Mohamed Amaan Khan	849	0.71	New
Margin of victory		6,047	5.07	−38.63h
Turnout		119,385	41.35	−16.57
Registered electors		288,708		
BJP gain from DMK		Swing	-16.16	

=== 1996 ===
1996 Tamil Nadu Legislative Assembly election: Mylapore
Party	Candidate	Votes	%	±%
DMK	N. P. Ramajayam	79,736	67.25	+33.13
AIADMK	T. K. Sampath	27,932	23.56	−35.76
BJP	K. Sujata Rao	5,262	4.44	+0.71
JD	K. S. Srinivasan	2,332	1.97	New
TLJ	R. Jebamani	1,226	1.03	New
PMK	S. Sellvaraj	1,099	0.93	New
Margin of victory		51,804	43.69	18.50
Turnout		118,565	57.92	3.52
Registered electors		207,825		
DMK gain from AIADMK		Swing	7.94	

=== 1994 by-election ===
1994 by-election: Mylapore
Party	Candidate	Votes	%	±%
AIADMK	V. Balasubramaniyan	40,756		
DMK	N. P. Thiyagarajan	35,021		
Margin of victory		5,735		
Turnout				
AIADMK hold		Swing		

=== 1991 ===
1991 Tamil Nadu Legislative Assembly election: Mylapore
Party	Candidate	Votes	%	±%
AIADMK	T. M. Rangarajan	62,845	59.31	+33.78
DMK	Nirmala Suresh	36,149	34.12	−6.76
BJP	G. Kumaravelu	3,950	3.73	New
PMK	G. Balasubramaniam	1,335	1.26	New
JP	G. N. Sridharan	920	0.87	New
Margin of victory		26,696	25.20	9.85
Turnout		105,954	54.40	−15.07
Registered electors		197,453		
AIADMK gain from DMK		Swing	18.43	

=== 1989 ===
1989 Tamil Nadu Legislative Assembly election: Mylapore
Party	Candidate	Votes	%	±%
DMK	N. Ganapathy	48,461	40.88	−5.34
AIADMK	Sarojini Varadappan	30,266	25.53	−26.14
AIADMK	S. K. Viswanathan	27,764	23.42	−28.25
Independent	M. K. Balan	6,554	5.53	New
Independent	R. Jebamani	2,575	2.17	New
Independent	S. Ve. Shekher	1,018	0.86	New
Independent	V. R. Nedunchezhiyan	596	0.5	New
Margin of victory		18,195	15.35	9.90
Turnout		118,538	69.47	3.51
Registered electors		173,258		
DMK gain from AIADMK		Swing	-10.79	

=== 1984 ===
1984 Tamil Nadu Legislative Assembly election: Mylapore
Party	Candidate	Votes	%	±%
AIADMK	B. Valarmathi	51,870	51.68	+2.02
DMK	R. S. Bharathi	46,396	46.22	+0.56
Independent	Rajappa S. Alias Arunachalam	960	0.96	New
Margin of victory		5,474	5.45	1.46
Turnout		100,374	65.96	7.67
Registered electors		156,793		
AIADMK hold		Swing	2.02	

=== 1980 ===
1980 Tamil Nadu Legislative Assembly election: Mylapore
Party	Candidate	Votes	%	±%
AIADMK	T. K. Kapali	41,260	49.66	+24.86
DMK	Nanjil K. Manoharan	37,944	45.67	+11.92
BJP	G. Kalivarathan	3,015	3.63	New
Margin of victory		3,316	3.99	−2.37
Turnout		83,089	58.29	7.14
Registered electors		143,818		
AIADMK gain from DMK		Swing	15.91	

=== 1977 ===
1977 Tamil Nadu Legislative Assembly election: Mylapore
Party	Candidate	Votes	%	±%
DMK	T. K. Kapali	26,044	33.75	−11.24
JP	Lakshmi Krishnamurthi	21,138	27.39	New
AIADMK	Mylai Narasimhan	19,139	24.80	New
INC	Chinna Annamalai	10,449	13.54	−41.47
Margin of victory		4,906	6.36	−3.66
Turnout		77,167	51.15	−18.02
Registered electors		152,323		
DMK gain from INC		Swing	-21.26	

=== 1971 ===
1971 Tamil Nadu Legislative Assembly election: Mylapore
Party	Candidate	Votes	%	±%
INC	T. N. Anandanayaki	42,301	55.01	+12.02
DMK	M. P. Sivagnanam	34,598	44.99	−12.02
Margin of victory		7,703	10.02	−4.01
Turnout		76,899	69.17	−4.66
Registered electors		114,082		
INC gain from DMK		Swing	-2.01	

=== 1967 ===
1967 Madras Legislative Assembly election: Mylapore
Party	Candidate	Votes	%	±%
DMK	Arangannal	37,498	57.02	+16.78
INC	V. R. Radhakrishnan	28,270	42.98	+14.2
Margin of victory		9,228	14.03	2.58
Turnout		65,768	73.82	1.48
Registered electors		90,731		
DMK hold		Swing	16.78	

=== 1962 ===
1962 Madras Legislative Assembly election: Mylapore
Party	Candidate	Votes	%	±%
DMK	Arangannal	25,825	40.24	New
INC	A. Varadappa Chettiar	18,472	28.78	−23.85
PSP	S. Vijayalakshmi	10,172	15.85	New
SWA	M. Sivaraman	6,984	10.88	New
Independent	Kathirvalu	2,731	4.25	New
Margin of victory		7,353	11.46	−3.10
Turnout		64,184	72.34	38.31
Registered electors		91,992		
DMK gain from INC		Swing	-12.40	

=== 1957 ===
1957 Madras Legislative Assembly election: Mylapore
Party	Candidate	Votes	%	±%
INC	C. R. Ramaswamy	16,932	52.63	+13.81
PSP	Kumari S. Viayalakshmi	12,251	38.08	New
Independent	A. K. M. Pitchai	2,986	9.28	New
Margin of victory		4,681	14.55	−14.34
Turnout		32,169	34.04	−20.37
Registered electors		94,513		
INC hold		Swing	13.81	

=== 1952 ===
1952 Madras Legislative Assembly election: Mylapore
Party	Candidate	Votes	%	±%
INC	C. R. Ramaswamy	15,647	38.82	New
Independent	Krishna Murthi	4,004	9.93	New
Independent	Emmanuel Adimoolam	3,405	8.45	New
Independent	Kanniappan	3,279	8.14	New
Independent	Krishnana	3,089	7.66	New
Independent	A. V. Raman	2,552	6.33	New
Socialist Party (India)	Appu Rao	2,501	6.21	New
Independent	D. Kannappan	1,698	4.21	New
Justice Party	Balasundara Naicker	1,377	3.42	New
Independent	Sakuntala Bai	979	2.43	New
KMPP	Arunachalam	652	1.62	New
Margin of victory		11,643	28.89	
Turnout		40,303	54.41	
Registered electors		74,076		
INC win (new seat)				
