= Nanjil K. Manoharan =

Indian politician

Minister of Revenue (Government of Tamil Nadu)
- In office 1996–2000
- Chief Minister: M. Karunanidhi
- In office 1989–1991
- Chief Minister: M. Karunanidhi

Deputy Secretary General of DMK
- In office 1980–2000
- Leader: M. Karunanidhi
- Secretary General: K. Anbazhagan

Minister of Finance (Government of Tamil Nadu)
- In office 1977–1980
- Chief Minister: M. G. Ramachandran

Leader of the Tamil Nadu Legislative Assembly House
- In office 30 June 1977 – 15 February 1980

Personal details
- Born: 10 February 1929 Kottar, Nagercoil, Travancore State (now in Kanyakumari district, Tamil Nadu), India
- Died: 1 August 2000 (aged 71) Chennai, Tamil Nadu, India
- Party: DMK, AIADMK
- Spouse: Married
- Children: 2 (son) and 2 (daughter)
- Occupation: Politician

Nanjil Krishnan Manoharan (10 February 1929 – 1 August 2000) was an Indian politician and former Member of the Legislative Assembly of Tamil Nadu. He was Tamil Nadu's minister of Finance during 1977–1980 and minister of Revenue during 1996–2000.

== Personal life ==
Manoharan was born in Nagercoil on 10th February 1929 to Thiru. Krishnan. He did his college in Scott Christian College, Nagercoil and Pachaiyappa's college, Madras. He died of cardiac arrest at the age of 71 on 1 August 2000 in Chennai. He was survived by his wife, two sons and two daughters.

== Political career ==
- He was elected to the Tamil Nadu legislative assembly four times, in 1977, 1984, 1989 and 1996.
- He was elected to the Indian Parliament three times to the 3rd Lok Sabha(1962-1967), 4th Lok Sabha(1967-1970) and 5th Lok Sabha (1971 -1977 ).
- He was a member of the Dravida Munnetra Kazhagam (DMK) till 1972.
- Then he announced his decision to join Anna Dravida Munnetra Kazhagam (ADMK) on 13th November 1972 while he was still a sitting Lok Sabha MP, originally elected from DMK ticket. This was notably before the Anti Defection Law.
- He served as Finance minister in the M. G. Ramachandran (MGR) cabinet during 1977–80.
- He returned to the DMK in 1980 and became its Deputy General Secretary. He was a good speaker and poetry writer. He was the Revenue minister in the M. Karunanidhi cabinet during 1989–1991 and 1996–2000.

== Assault at Madras Airport ==
Manoharan raised a question of Privileges in Lok Sabha alleging he was assaulted on 15th November 1972 at Madras Airport. The Committee on Privileges investigated the issue and 11th Report of the Committee was released regarding this matter in July of 1974. The Chief Minister M. Karunanidhi condemned the assault.

== Electoral history ==
Election	Post	Constituency	Winner	Votes	Party	Runner-up	Votes	Party	Status
1962	M.P	Chennai South	K. Nanjil Manoharan	1,51,917	DMK	C. R. Ramaswamy	89,771	INC	Won
1967	M.P	Chennai North	K. Nanjil Manoharan	2,27,783	DMK	S. C. C. A. Pillai	1,66,449	INC	Won
1971	M.P	Chennai North	K. Nanjil Manoharan	2,45,401	DMK	S. G. Vinayaga Moorthy	1,93,807	NCO	Won
1977	M.L.A	Palayamkottai	K. Nanjil Manoharan	29,146	ADMK	N. Shanmugan	15,192	IND	Won
1980	M.L.A	Mylapore	T. K. Kapali	41,260	ADMK	K. Nanjil Manoharan	37,944	DMK	Lost
1984	M.L.A	Purasawalkam	K. Nanjil Manoharan	61,246	DMK	K. Suppu	56,736	ADMK	Won
1989	M.L.A	Triplicane	K. Nanjil Manoharan	36,414	DMK	H. V. Hande	26,442	ADMK (JL)	Won
1991	M.L.A	Triplicane	Mohammad Asif	39,028	ADMK	K. Nanjil Manoharan	26,576	DMK	Lost
1996	M.L.A	Triplicane	K. Nanjil Manoharan	50,401	DMK	A. Wahab	15,390	ADMK	Won
