= H. V. Hande =

Indian medical practitioner and politician (born 1927)

H V Hande

Minister for Health, Tamil Nadu
- In office 9 June 1980 – 21 October 1986
- Chief Minister: M. G. Ramachandran
- Preceded by: R. Soundararajan
- Succeeded by: P. U. Shanmugam

1st Deputy General Secretary of the All India Anna Dravida Munnetra Kazhagam
- Preceded by: Position established
- Succeeded by: V. R. Nedunchezhiyan and R. M. Veerappan

Personal details
- Born: 28 November 1927 (age 98) Coimbatore, Tamil Nadu
- Occupation: Medical practitioner, politician

H. V. Hande (born 28 November 1927) is an Indian medical practitioner and a politician. He was associated with Swatantra Party, AIADMK and BJP and was considered a close ally of C. Rajagopalachari and M. G. R. He was legislator five times and was Health Minister in Tamil Nadu for two terms. He has also written books on Ramayana and Dr. Ambedkar.

== Personal life ==
Dr. HV Hande was born into a Kota Brahmin family as one among the ten children of Dr. H. Venkataramana Hande, a surgeon working under British Raj and Mahalakshmi at Coimbatore. The family had their ancestral roots in Mangalore. He completed his schooling from Nellore, Penukonda and Mangalore and did medical education from Kilpauk Medical College in 1950. He married Shanthi in 1954 and his sons Krishna Hande and Vishwanath Hande are doctors. He set up Hande Hospital in Chennai in 1984.

== Political career ==
He has taken part in Quit India Movement during pre university days in Mangalore. The electoral foray began when he contested as an Independent candidate from Graduates Constituency and became a member of Tamil Nadu Legislative Council in 1964. Thereafter he joined Swatantra Party and was elected to the Tamil Nadu legislative assembly from Park Town constituency in the 1967 and 1971 elections. In 1970 he became one of the All India Secretary of Swatantra Party and after the death of Rajaji he joined AIADMK. In 1978 he got elected to Tamil Nadu Legislative Council from the Madras City Graduates Constituency. In 1980 elections, Hande stood from the Anna Nagar constituency as a candidate of the AIADMK and lost by a margin of 699 votes to M. Karunanidhi. In 1984 he got reelected to Legislative Council.

He was Minister of Health (1980-86) twice in 2nd and 3rd Ramachandran ministry. He transformed Public health in Tamil Nadu by bringing down Infant mortality, combating Leprosy, improving Primary health care facilities etc. The Medical Council of India honoured him with Dr. B. C. Roy Award in 1985 for excellence as a Health Minister. Another notable event in his stint was, in 1986 he announced the first HIV/AIDS case in India when reported in a study done at Christian Medical College Vellore He was also instrumental in the hospitalization and subsequent Air lifting of M. G. Ramachandran to Downstate Medical Center Brooklyn in 1984. He ceased to be a legislator with abolition of Tamil Nadu Legislative Council and after the death of M. G. R. in 1987 he kept away from active legislative politics.

In 1999, he joined Bharatiya Janata Party and he became National Council member of Bharatiya Janata Party in 2004. He contested in the 2006 elections from Anna Nagar as a candidate of the Bharatiya Janata Party but could only garner 9000 votes.

== Electoral performance ==
| Election | Constituency | Political party | Result | Vote % | Opposition | | | Ref |
| Election | Constituency | Political party | Result | Vote % | Candidate | Political party | Vote % | Ref |
|---|---|---|---|---|---|---|---|---|
| 1967 | Park Town | SWA | Won | 51.57% | T. N. Anandanayaki | INC | 46.83% | |
| 1980 | Anna Nagar | AIADMK | Lost | 48.31% | M. Karunanidhi | DMK | 48.97% | |
| 1989 | Triplicane | AIADMK | Lost | 33.30% | Nanjil K. Manoharan | DMK | 45.86% | |
| 2006 | Anna Nagar | BJP | Lost | 3.64% | Arcot N. Veeraswami | DMK | 46.20% | |
