= S. A. M. Hussain =

Indian politician (died 2019)

MLA of Triplicane
- In office 2001–2006
- Preceded by: Nanjil K. Manoharan
- Succeeded by: Bader Sayeed

Personal details
- Born: 1938/39
- Died: 6 August 2019
- Party: Dravida Munnetra Kazhagam

S. A. M. Hussain was an Indian politician belonging to Dravida Munnetra Kazhagam. He was elected as a member of Tamil Nadu Legislative Assembly from Triplicane in 2001. He died on 6 August 2019 at the age of 80.
