= 1991 Tamil Nadu Legislative Assembly election =

Indian election

- 15 June 1991

All 234 seats in the Tamil Nadu Legislative Assembly 118 seats needed for a majority
- Turnout: 63.84% (▼5.85%)
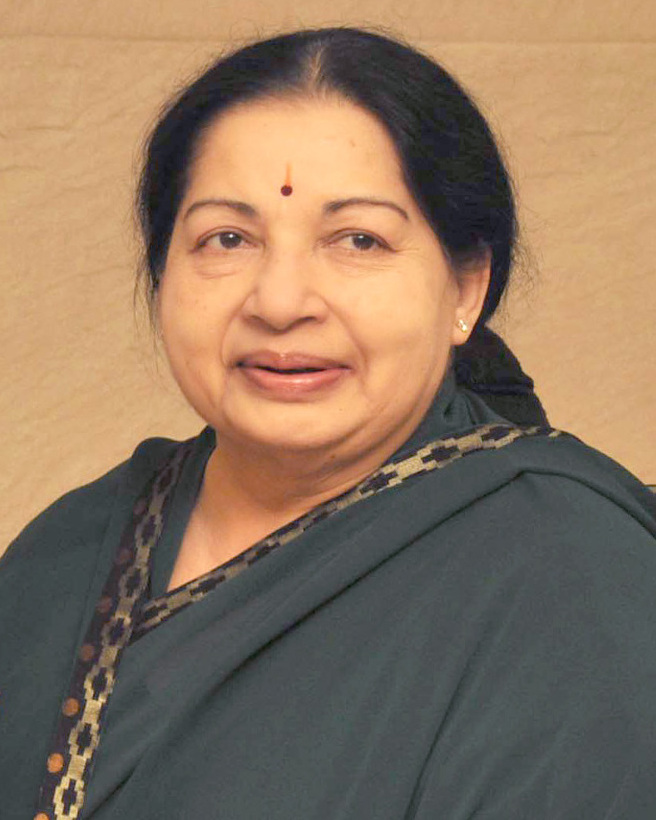

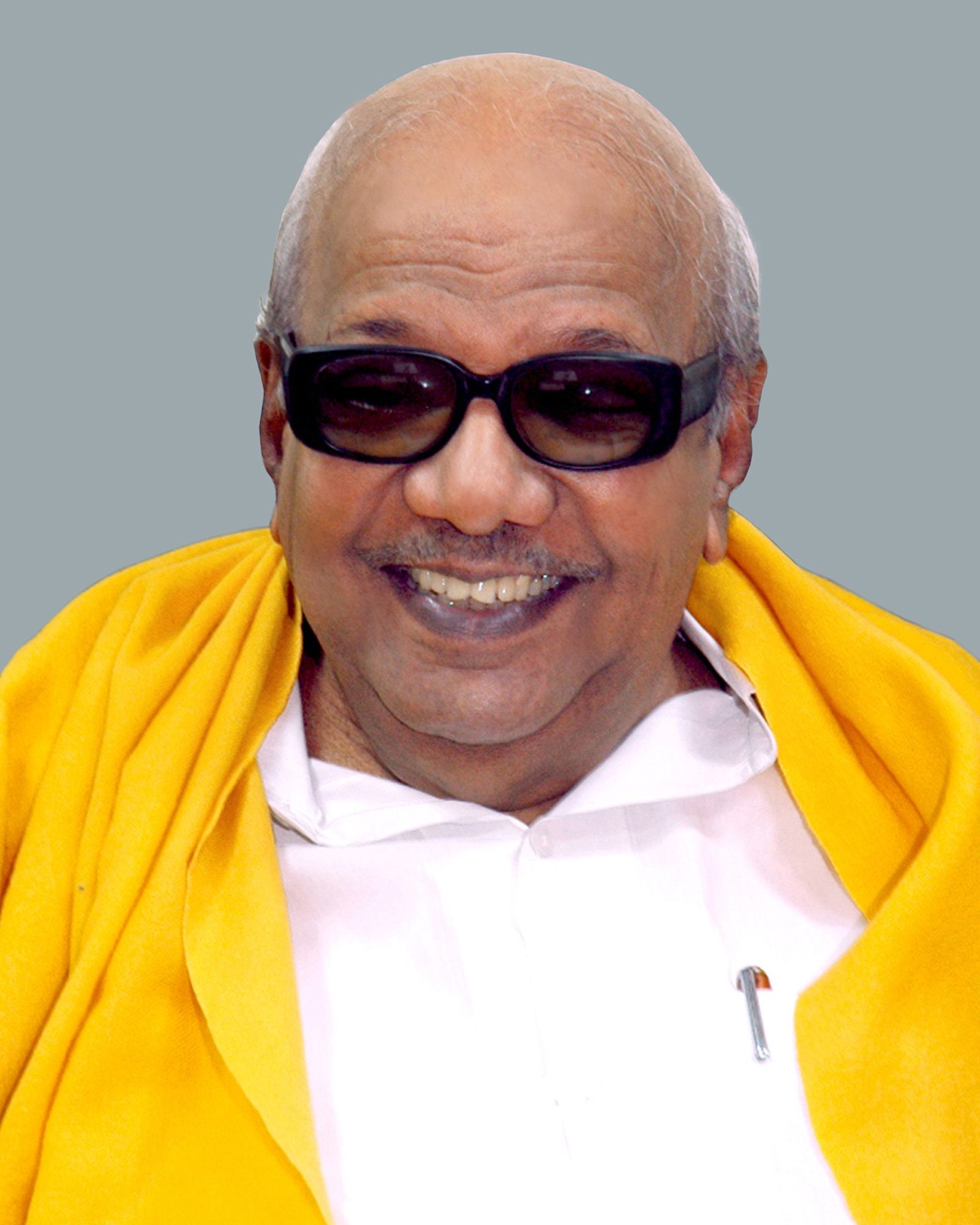
	First party	Second party
Leader	J. Jayalalithaa	M. Karunanidhi
Party	AIADMK	DMK
Alliance	Congress alliance	NF+LF
Leader's seat	Bargur (retained); Kangayam (vacated)	Harbour (vacated)
Seats won	164	2
Seat change	▲137	▼148
Popular vote	10,940,966	5,535,668
Percentage	44.4%	22.5%
Swing	▲22.2%	▼10.7%
Alliance seats	225	7
Alliance seat change	▲172	▼164
Alliance popular vote	14,738,042	7,405,935
Alliance percentage	59.8%	30.0%
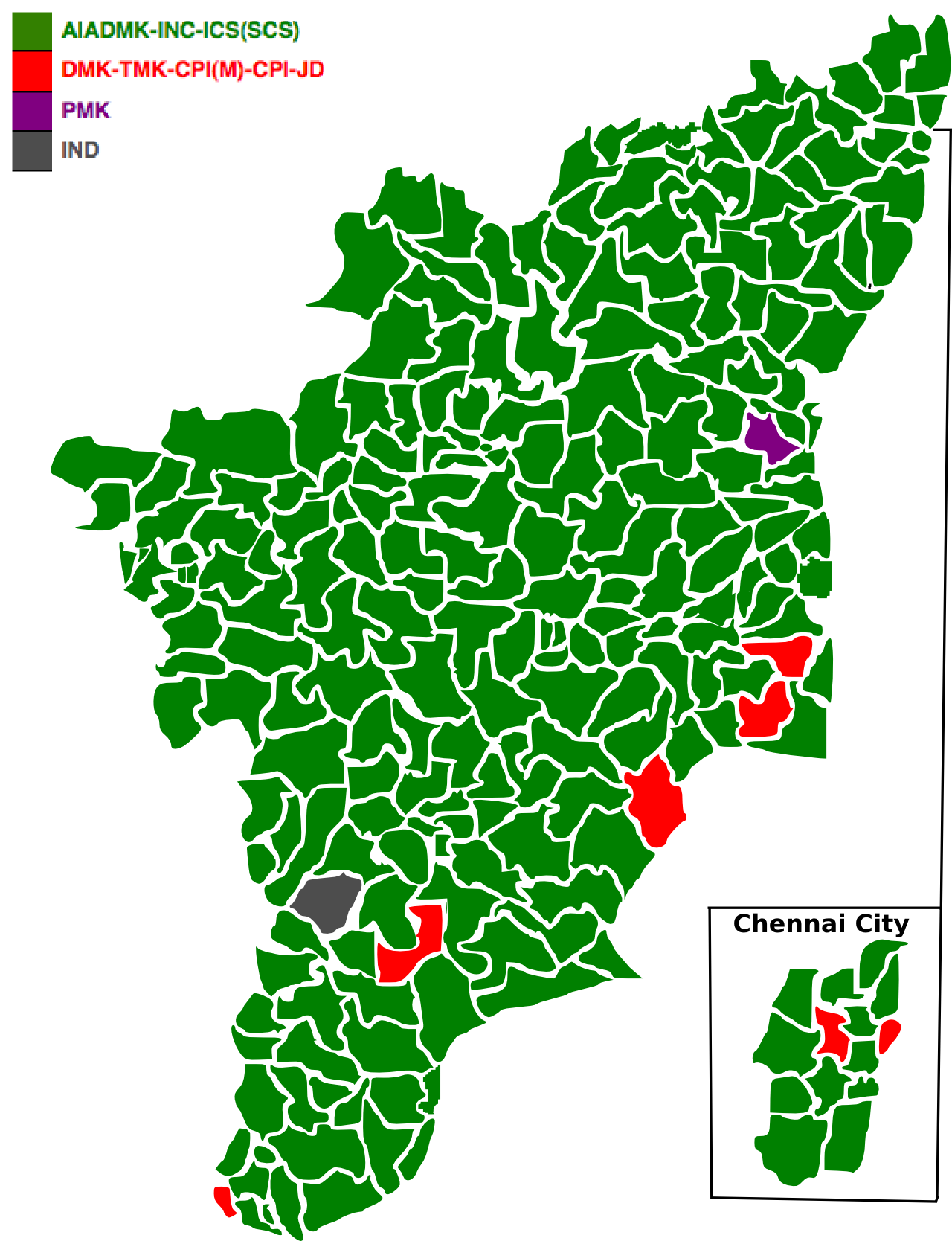
- 1991 election map (by constituencies)

- Alliance wise Result
Chief Minister before election
President's rule
Elected Chief Minister
J. Jayalalithaa
AIADMK

The tenth legislative assembly election of Tamil Nadu was held on 15 June 1991, to elect representatives from the 234 constituencies in the Indian State of Tamil Nadu. The All India Anna Dravida Munnetra Kazhagam (AIADMK) – Indian National Congress (INC) alliance won the elections in a landslide manner and AIADMK general secretary J. Jayalalithaa became the chief minister on 24 June 1991. This was her first term in office. The united strength of AIADMK after the merger of J. Jayalalithaa, V. N. Janaki Ramachandran and R.M Veerappan faction, who was made Joint General Secretary of AIADMK, the alliance with the Congress, and the wave of public sympathy in the wake of Rajiv Gandhi assassination combined to produce a massive victory for the AIADMK. The DMK could only win 2 seats. This was the worst performance of the DMK since it entered electoral politics in the 1957 Madras State Legislative Assembly elections.

== Background ==
=== President's rule ===
On 30 January 1991, the DMK government which had come to power after winning the 1989 assembly election, was dismissed by the Indian Prime minister Chandra Shekhar using Article 356 of the Indian Constitution. President's rule was imposed on Tamil Nadu from 31 January. The reason cited for the dismissal was the deterioration of law and order in the state. The dismissal followed pressure on the Chandra Shekhar government by the Congress and AIADMK to dismiss the DMK government. The Chandra Shekhar government fell in March 1991 after the Congress withdrew its outside support. Fresh elections for both the Indian parliament and Tamil Nadu Legislative Assembly were scheduled for June 1991.

=== Unification of AIADMK ===
The AIADMK which had contested and lost the 1989 elections as two different factions reunited under the leadership of Jayalalithaa in February 1989. The V. N. Janaki Ramachandran faction merged with the Jayalalithaa faction to form a single united party and Janaki retired from politics. The reunited party regained the popular "Two Leaves" symbol of the AIADMK. (The Election Commission of India had frozen the symbol for the 1989 elections due to the split). The united AIADMK was able to prove its strength immediately by winning the elections held for two constituencies -Marungapuri and Madurai East on 11 March 1989. (for these two constituencies elections had been postponed earlier due to technical reasons).The AIADMK then allied with the Congress for the 1989 Parliamentary elections. The AIADMK-Congress alliance won 38 of the 39 Lok Sabha seats in that election routing the DMK-Janata Dal led National Front.

=== Formation of PMK ===
The 1991 elections was the first state elections contested by the Pattali Makkal Katchi (PMK), S. Ramadoss, the leader of the Vanniyar caste organisation which demanded proportional reservation in education and employment based on population ratio of each community – the Vanniyar Sangam converted into a political party and entered electoral politics with the 1989 parliamentary elections. The emergence of PMK cut into the DMK's political base in the northern districts of Tamil Nadu.

=== Formation of TMK ===
In 1991, the Thayaga Marumalarchi Kazhagam (TMK) was formed by the actor-politician Vijaya T. Rajendar after he split from the DMK. Later, some of the second rung leaders of the ADMK including Su. Thirunavukkarasar, K. K. S. S. R. Ramachandran, S. D. Ugamchand, V. Karuppasamy Pandian split from the party. For the 1991 elections they formed a pact with T. Rajendar and contested as TMK candidates.

=== Assassination of Rajiv Gandhi ===
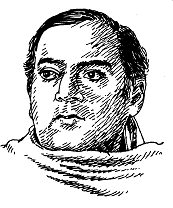
Rajiv Gandhi
1944–1991

The election campaign was also marked by the assassination of former Prime Minister Rajiv Gandhi at Sriperumbudur, Tamil Nadu on 21 May 1991.

By mid-April 1991, the explosive device intended for the assassination of Rajiv Gandhi and others had been prepared. The first dry run was reportedly conducted on 18 April 1991 at Marina Beach, during a massive election rally where Rajiv and his Ally AIADMK General Secretary J. Jayalalithaa shared the stage and delivered campaign speeches. However, the conspirators did not attempt to approach the two leaders closely during this event.

A second dry run took place at Thiruvallur in Arakkonam, 40 km away from Madras on 12 May 1991 during a public campaign meeting attended by the National Front leaders V. P. Singh and DMK President M. Karunanidhi. During this event, the operative later identified as Dhanu was able to approach Singh and touch his feet in a customary gesture of respect, a method that was subsequently used in the assassination of Rajiv Gandhi nine days later. On May 20, AIADMK General Secretary Jayalalithaa distributed campaign funds to her party candidates at her Poes Garden residence in Madras, a day before she was scheduled to campaign in Bodinayakkanur on May 21.

On 21 May 1991, leader of the Indian National Congress and its prime ministerial candidate for the 1991 general elections was assassinated by a LTTE suicide bomber. The assassination took place at a campaign meeting at Sriperumpudur where he was campaigning for the Congress candidate Maragatham Chandrasekar. The first phase of polling was completed in other states on 20 May 1991 (When Rajiv cast his vote at New Delhi), with Tamil Nadu scheduled to vote in the final phase on 26 May. Following the assassination, polling in Tamil Nadu was postponed to 15 June 1991.

=== Coalitions ===
The two main political formations in this election were the DMK and AIADMK led fronts. The DMK coalition comprised the Communist Party of India (CPI), Communist Party of India (Marxist) (CPM), Janata Dal (JD) and Thayaga Marumalarchi Kazhagam (TMK). The AIADMK front had only two major parties – itself and the Congress. The AIADMK also backed the ICS (SCS) candidate Sanjay Ramasamy in the Virudhunagar constituency. Several smaller parties like the PMK contested the elections alone.

== Seat allotments ==
=== Congress Front ===
AIADMK-led Alliance
Party	Flag	Symbol	Leader	Seats	
All India Anna Dravida Munnetra Kazhagam			J. Jayalalithaa	162	168
Human Rights Party of India			L. Elayaperumal	2	168
Indian Uzhavar Uzhaippalar Katchi			Chellamuthu	1	168
Republican Party of India			C. K. Thamizharasan	1	168
Forward Bloc (Rebellion)			S. Andi Thevar	1	168
Indian National Congress			Vazhappady K. Ramamurthy	64	65
United Communist Party of India			D. Pandian	1	65
Indian Congress (Socialist)			Sanjay Ramasamy	1	
Total				234	

=== United Front ===
DMK-led Alliance
Party	Flag	Symbol	Leader	Seats	
Dravida Munnetra Kazhagam			M. Karunanidhi	170	175
Muslim League (Lathief)			M. Abdul Latheif	4	175
Scheduled People Liberation Organization			S. P. Raj	1	175
Communist Party of India (Marxist)			A. Nallasivam	22	
Janata Dal			Sivaji Ganesan	15	
Thayaga Marumalarchi Kazhagam			Vijaya T. Rajendar	10	
Communist Party of India			P. Manickam	10	
All India Forward Bloc			P. N. Vallarasu	1	
AIADMK (Janaki Faction)			P. H. Pandian	1	
Total				234	

== List of Candidates ==
Constituency		AIADMK+		DMK+	
#	Name (Note: SC and ST indicate constituencies reserved for Scheduled Castes and Scheduled Tribes respectively.)	Party	Candidate	Party	Candidate
1	Royapuram	ADMK	D. Jayakumar	DMK	R. Mathivanan
2	Harbour	INC	K. Suppu	DMK	M. Karunanidhi
3	R. K. Nagar	ADMK	E. Madhusudhanan	JD	V. Rajasekaran
4	Park Town	INC	U. Balaraman	DMK	A. Rahman Khan
5	Perambur (SC)	ADMK	M. P. Sekar	DMK	Chengai Sivam
6	Purasawalkam	INC	B. Ranganathan	DMK	Arcot N. Veeraswami
7	Egmore (SC)	INC	D. Yasodha	DMK	Parithi Ilamvazhuthi
8	Anna Nagar	INC	A. Chellakumar	DMK	S. M. Ramachandran
9	Theagaraya Nagar	ADMK	S. Jayakumar	DMK	S. A. Ganesan
10	Thousand Lights	ADMK	K. A. Krishnaswamy	DMK	M. K. Stalin
11	Chepauk	INC	Zeenath Sheriffdeen	DMK	K. Anbazhagan
12	Triplicane	ADMK	Mohamad Asif	DMK	Nanjil K. Manoharan
13	Mylapore	ADMK	T. M. Rangarajan	DMK	Nirmala Suresh
14	Saidapet	ADMK	M. K. Balan	DMK	R. S. Sridhar
15	Gummidipundi	ADMK	R. Sakkubai	DMK	K. Venu
16	Ponneri (SC)	ADMK	E. Ravikumar	DMK	K. Parthasarathy
17	Thiruvottiyur	ADMK	K. Kuppan	DMK	T. K. Pallanisamy
18	Villivakkam	INC	E. Kalan	CPI(M)	W. R. Varadarajan
19	Alandur	ADMK	S. Annamalai	DMK	Pammal Nallathambi
20	Tambaram	INC	S. M. Krishnan	DMK	M. A. Vaithyalingam
21	Tirupporur (SC)	ADMK	M. Dhanapal	DMK	G. Chockalingam
22	Chengalpattu	ADMK	C. D. Vardarajan	DMK	V. Tamilmani
23	Maduranthakam	ADMK	P. Chockalingam	TMK	S. D. Ugamchand
24	Acharapakkam (SC)	ADMK	E. Ramakrishnan	DMK	M. Jayapal
25	Uthiramerur	ADMK	Kanchi Panneerselvam	DMK	K. Sundar
26	Kancheepuram	ADMK	C. P. Pattabiraman	DMK	P. Murugesan
27	Sriperumbudur (SC)	INC	Polur Varadhan	DMK	E. Kothandam
28	Poonamallee	INC	D. Sudarsanam	DMK	D. Rajarathinam
29	Tiruvallur	ADMK	D. Sakkubai Devaraj	DMK	C. Subramani
30	Tiruttani	ADMK	K. Rasanbabu	JD	C. Chinrajeevulu Naidu
31	Pallipet	INC	A. Eakambara Reddy	DMK	T. Lokanathan
32	Arkonam (SC)	INC	Lata Priyakumar	DMK	G. Mani
33	Sholinghur	INC	A. M. Munirathinam	DMK	C. Manickam
34	Ranipet	ADMK	N. G. Venugopal	DMK	M. Abdul Latheef (Note: Lathief-lef Muslim League contested on the "Rising Sun" symbol of the Dravida Munnetra Kazhagam (DMK), and is officially recorded as a DMK candidate in electoral records.)
35	Arcot	ADMK	G. Viswanathan	DMK	T. R. Gajapathi
36	Katpadi	ADMK	K. M. Kalaiselvi	DMK	Durai Murugan
37	Gudiyatham	INC	V. Dhandayuthapani	CPI(M)	R. Paramasivam
38	Pernambut (SC)	ADMK	J. Parandaman	DMK	V. Govindan
39	Vaniyambadi	INC	E. Sampath	DMK	A. Abdul Hameed
40	Natrampalli	ADMK	R. Indira Kumari	DMK	N. K. Raja
41	Tiruppattur	ADMK	A. K. C. Sundaravel	DMK	B. Sundaram
42	Chengam (SC)	ADMK	P. Veera Pandiyan	JD	K. Munusamy
43	Thandarambattu	ADMK	M. K. Sundaram	DMK	D. Ponmudi
44	Tiruvannamalai	INC	V. Kannan	DMK	K. Pitchandi
45	Kalasapakkam	INC	M. Sundarasami	DMK	P. S. Thiruvengadam
46	Polur	ADMK	T. Vediyappan	DMK	A. Rajendran
47	Anaicut	ADMK	K. Dharmalingam	DMK	S. P. Kannan
48	Vellore	INC	C. Gnanasekharan	DMK	A. M. Ramalingam
49	Arni	ADMK	I. R. Jaison Jacob	DMK	E. Selvarasu
50	Cheyyar	ADMK	A. Devaraj	DMK	V. Anbazhagan
51	Vandavasi (SC)	ADMK	C. K. Thamizharasan (Note: Republican Party of India contested on the "Two Leaves" symbol of the All India Anna Dravida Munnetra Kazhagam (AIADMK), and is officially recorded as a AIADMK candidate in electoral records.)	DMK	V. Rajagopal
52	Peranamallur	ADMK	A. K. Srinivasan	DMK	G. Subramaniyan
53	Melmalayanur	INC	G. Janakiramam	DMK	R. Panchatcharam
54	Gingee	INC	S. S. R. Eramasass	DMK	N. Ramachandaran
55	Tindivanam	INC	S. Pannirselvam	DMK	R. Masilamani
56	Vanur (SC)	ADMK	S. Arumugam (Note: Human Rights Party of India contested on the "Two Leaves" symbol of the All India Anna Dravida Munnetra Kazhagam (AIADMK), and is officially recorded as a AIADMK candidate in electoral records.)	DMK	N. V. Jayaseelan (Note: Scheduled People Liberation Organization contested on the "Rising Sun" symbol of the Dravida Munnetra Kazhagam (DMK), and is officially recorded as a DMK candidate in electoral records.)
57	Kandamangalam (SC)	ADMK	V. Subramanian	DMK	S. Alaguvelu
58	Villupuram	ADMK	D. Janaardhanan	DMK	K. Ponmudy
59	Mugaiyur	ADMK	R. Savithiri Ammal	DMK	A. G. Sampath
60	Thirunavalur	ADMK	J. Panneerselvam	DMK	A. V. Balasubramaniyam
61	Ulundurpet (SC)	ADMK	M. Anandan	DMK	Pon Mayilvahanan
62	Nellikuppam	ADMK	C. Damotharan	CPI(M)	C. Govindarajan
63	Cuddalore	INC	P. R. S. Venkatesan	DMK	E. Pugazhendi
64	Panruti	ADMK	R. Devasundaram	DMK	A. Mani
65	Kurinjipadi	ADMK	K. Sivasubramanian	DMK	N. Ganeshmoorthy
66	Bhuvanagiri	ADMK	G. Malliga	DMK	R. T. Sabapathy Mohan
67	Kattumannarkoil (SC)	ADMK	N. R. Rajendiran	DMK	E. Ramalingam
68	Chidambaram	INC	K. S. Alagiri	DMK	M. R. K. Panneerselvam
69	Vridhachalam	ADMK	R. D. Aranganathan	DMK	M. Selvaraju
70	Mangalore (SC)	INC	S. Puratchimani	DMK	C. V. Ganesan
71	Rishivandiam	ADMK	M. Govindasraju	DMK	M. Thangam
72	Chinnasalem	ADMK	R. P. Paramasivam	DMK	R. Mookappan
73	Sankarapuram	ADMK	C. Ramaswamy	DMK	S. Arunachalam
74	Hosur	INC	K. A. Manoharan	JD	B. Venkataswamy
75	Thalli	INC	M. Venkataramareddy	JD	B. Ramachandrareddy
76	Kaveripattinam	ADMK	K. P. Munusamy	DMK	V. C. Govindasamy
77	Krishnagiri	ADMK	K. Munivektatappan	DMK	T. H. Musta Ahmed
78	Bargur	ADMK	J. Jayalalithaa	DMK	E. G. Sugavanam (Note: Friendly fight between Dravida Munnetra Kazhagam (DMK) and Thayaga Marumalarchi Kazhagam (TMK) in Bargur Assembly constituency)
78	Bargur	ADMK	J. Jayalalithaa	TMK	T. Rajendar
79	Harur (SC)	INC	P. Abaranji	CPI(M)	M. Annamalai
80	Morappur	ADMK	K. Singaram	DMK	V. Samikannu
81	Palacode	ADMK	M. G. Sekhar	JD	K. Arunachalam
82	Dharmapuri	INC	P. Ponnusamy	DMK	R. Chinnasamy
83	Pennagaram	ADMK	V. Purushothaman	CPI	M. Arumugam
84	Mettur	ADMK	S. Sundarambal	CPI(M)	M. Seerangan
85	Taramangalam	INC	R. Palanisamy	JD	P. Nacrimuthu
86	Omalur	ADMK	C. Krishnan	CPI	K. A. Govindasamy
87	Yercaud (ST)	ADMK	C. Perumal	DMK	Dhanakodi Vedan
88	Salem-I	INC	S. R. Jayaraman	DMK	G. K. Subash
89	Salem-II	ADMK	M. Natesan	DMK	S. Arumugam
90	Veerapandi	ADMK	K. Arjunan	DMK	P. Venkatachalam
91	Panamarathupatty	ADMK	K. Rajaram	DMK	S. R. Sivalingam
92	Attur	ADMK	V. Tamilarasu	DMK	A. M. Ramasamy
93	Talavasal (SC)	INC	K. Kandasamy	DMK	S. Gunasekaran
94	Rasipuram	ADMK	K. Palaniammal	DMK	B. A. R. Elangoavan
95	Sendamangalam (ST)	ADMK	K. Chinnasamy	TMK	S. Sivaprakasam
96	Namakkal (SC)	ADMK	S. Anbalagan	DMK	R. Mayavan
97	Kapilamalai	ADMK	P. Saraswathi	DMK	S. Moorthy
98	Tiruchengode	ADMK	T. M. Selvaganapathy	CPI(M)	V. Ramasamy
99	Sankari (SC)	ADMK	V. Saroja	DMK	R. Varadarajan
100	Edapadi	ADMK	K. Palaniswami	DMK	A. Kandasamy
101	Mettupalayam	ADMK	L. Sulochana	DMK	B. Arunkumar
102	Avanashi (SC)	ADMK	M. Seeniammal	CPI	M. Arumugham
103	Thondamuthur	ADMK	C. Aranganayagam	CPI(M)	U.K. Vellingiri
104	Singanallur	ADMK	P. Govindaraj	JD	R. Sengaliappan
105	Coimbatore West	INC	K. Selvaraj	DMK	M. Ramanathan
106	Coimbatore East	INC	V. K. Lakshmanan	CPI(M)	K.C. Karunakaran
107	Perur	ADMK	K. P. Raju	DMK	A. Natarasan
108	Kinathukkadavu	ADMK	N. S. Palanisamy (Note: Indian Uzhavar Uzhaippalar Katchi contested on the "Two Leaves" symbol of the All India Anna Dravida Munnetra Kazhagam (AIADMK), and is officially recorded as a AIADMK candidate in electoral records.)	DMK	K. Kandasamy
109	Pollachi	ADMK	V. P. Chandrasekar	DMK	M. N. Andu Alias Nachimuthu
110	Valparai (SC)	ADMK	A. Sridharan	CPI	A. T. Karuppaiah
111	Udumalpet	ADMK	K. P. Manivasagam	DMK	R. T. Mariappan
112	Dharapuram (SC)	ADMK	P. Eswaramurthi	DMK	T. Shanthakumari
113	Vellakoil	ADMK	Dhurai Ramaswammy	DMK	Subbulakshmi Jegadeesan
114	Pongalur	INC	S. R. Balasubramaniyam	DMK	P. Vijayalakshmi
115	Palladam	ADMK	K. S. Duraimurugan	DMK	M. Kannappan
116	Tiruppur	ADMK	V. Palanisamy	CPI(M)	C. Govindasamy
117	Kangayam	ADMK	J. Jayalalitha	DMK	N. S. Rajkumar Mandradiar
118	Modakurichi	ADMK	Kavinilavu Dharmaraj	DMK	K. Elanchezhian
119	Perundurai	ADMK	V. N. Subramanian	CPI	T. K. Naliappan
120	Erode	ADMK	C. Manickam	DMK	A. Ganeshamurthy
121	Bhavani	ADMK	S. Muthusamy	DMK	M. C. Duraisamy
122	Andhiyur (SC)	ADMK	V. Periasamy	DMK	Eradharukmani
123	Gobichettipalayam	ADMK	K. A. Sengottayan	DMK	V. P. Shanmogas Undaram
124	Bhavanisagar	ADMK	V. K. Chinnasamy	DMK	O. Subramaniam
125	Sathyamangalam	ADMK	A. T. Saraswathi	DMK	T. K. Subramaniam
126	Coonoor (SC)	ADMK	M. Karuppusamy	DMK	E. M. Mahaliappan
127	Ootacamund	INC	H. M. Raju	DMK	H. Natraj
128	Gudalur	ADMK	K. R. Raju	CPI(M)	T. P. Kamalatchan
129	Palani (SC)	ADMK	A. Subburathinam	CPI(M)	V. Balasekar
130	Oddanchatram	ADMK	A. T. Chellamuthu	DMK	T. Mohan
131	Periyakulam	ADMK	M. Periyaveeran	DMK	L. Mookiah
132	Theni	ADMK	V. R. Nedunchezhiyan	DMK	L. S. R. Krishnan
133	Bodinayakkanur	ADMK	V. Panneerselvam	DMK	G. Ponnu Pillai
134	Cumbum	INC	O. R. Ramachandran	DMK	P. Eramar
135	Andipatti	ADMK	K. Thavasi	DMK	P. Asaiyan
136	Sedapatti	ADMK	Sedapatti Muthiah	DMK	A. Athiyaman
137	Thirumangalam	ADMK	T. K. Radhakrishnan	DMK	R. Saminathan
138	Usilampatti	ADMK	R. Pandiammal	AIFB	P. N. Vallarasu
139	Nilakottai (SC)	INC	A. S. Ponnammal	DMK	M. Arivazhagan
140	Sholavandan	ADMK	A. M. Paramasivan	DMK	A. M. M. Ambikapathy
141	Tirupparankundram	ADMK	S. Andi Thevar (Note: Forward Bloc (Andi Thevar) contested on the "Two Leaves" symbol of the All India Anna Dravida Munnetra Kazhagam (AIADMK), and is officially recorded as a AIADMK candidate in electoral records.)	DMK	C. Ramachandran
142	Madurai West	INC	S. V. Shanmugam	DMK	Pon. Muthuramalingam
143	Madurai Central	INC	A. Deivanayagam	DMK	M. Tamilkudimagan
144	Madurai East	ADMK	O. S. Amarnath	CPI(M)	P. M. Kumar
145	Samayanallur (SC)	ADMK	M. Kalirajan	DMK	N. Soundarapandian
146	Melur	INC	K. V. V. Rajamanickam	CPI(M)	N. Palanisamy
147	Natham	INC	M. Andi Ambalam	DMK	P. Cheliam
148	Dindigul	ADMK	B. Nirmala	CPI(M)	S. A. Thangarajan
149	Athoor	ADMK	S. M. Durai	DMK	I. Periyasamy
150	Vedasandur	ADMK	S. Gandhirajan	DMK	P. Muthusamy
151	Aravakurichi	ADMK	Mariyamul Asia	DMK	P. Monjanur Ramasamy
152	Karur	ADMK	M. Chinnasamy	DMK	Vasuki Murugesan
153	Krishnarayapuram (SC)	ADMK	A. Arivalagan	DMK	R. Natarajan
154	Marungapuri	ADMK	K. Ponnusamy	DMK	N. Selvaraj
155	Kulithalai	ADMK	A. Pappa Sundaram	DMK	S. P. Sethiraman
156	Thottiam	ADMK	N. R. Sivapathi	DMK	K. Kannaiyan
157	Uppiliapuram (ST)	ADMK	V. Ravichandaran	DMK	M. Sundravadanam
158	Musiri	ADMK	M. Thangavel	DMK	R. Natarasan
159	Lalgudi	INC	J. Logambal	DMK	K. N. Nehru
160	Perambalur (SC)	ADMK	T. Sezhian	DMK	M. Devarajan
161	Varahur (SC)	ADMK	E. T. Ponnuvelu	DMK	C. Thiyagarajan
162	Ariyalur	ADMK	S. Manimegalai	DMK	K. Chinnappa
163	Andimadam	INC	K. R. Thangaraju	DMK	S. Sivasubramanian
164	Jayankondam	INC	K. K. Chinnappan	DMK	K. C. Ganesan
165	Srirangam	ADMK	Ku. Pa. Krishnan	JD	R. Jayabalan
166	Tiruchirapalli-I	ADMK	S. Arokiasamy	DMK	A. Malarmannan
167	Tiruchirapalli-II	ADMK	G. R. Mala Selvi	DMK	Anbil Poyyamozhi
168	Thiruverambur	ADMK	T. Rathinavel	CPI(M)	Pappa Umanath
169	Sirkali (SC)	ADMK	T. Moorthy	DMK	M. Panneerselvam
170	Poompuhar	ADMK	M. Poorasamy	DMK	M. Mohamed Siddik
171	Mayuram	INC	M. M. S. Abul Hassan	DMK	A. Senguttivan
172	Kuttalam	ADMK	S. Asaimani	DMK	Ko. Si. Mani
173	Nannilam (SC)	ADMK	K. Gopal	DMK	M. Manimaran
174	Tiruvarur (SC)	INC	M. Ramasamy	CPI(M)	V. Thambusamy
175	Nagapattinam	ADMK	R. Kodimari	CPI(M)	G. Veeraiyan
176	Vedaranyam	INC	P. V. Rajendran	DMK	M. Meenakshi Sundaram
177	Tiruthuraipundi (SC)	INC	V. Vedaiyan	CPI	G. Palanisamy
178	Mannargudi	ADMK	K. Srinivasan	CPI	V. Veerasenan
179	Pattukkottai	ADMK	K. Balasubramaniam	DMK	K. Annadurai
180	Peravurani	INC	R. Singaram	DMK	M. R. Govindan
181	Orathanad	ADMK	Alaguthirunavukkabasu	DMK	L. Ganesan
182	Thiruvonam	ADMK	K. Thangamuthu	DMK	M. Ramachandran
183	Thanjavur	ADMK	S. D. Somasundaram	DMK	S. N. M. Ubayadullah
184	Thiruvaiyaru	ADMK	P. Kalaiperumal	DMK	Durai Chandrasekaran
185	Papanasam	INC	S. Rajaraman	DMK	S. Kalayanasundaram
186	Valangiman (SC)	ADMK	K. Panchavarnam	DMK	S. Senthamil Chelvan
187	Kumbakonam	ADMK	Rama Ramanathan	JD	S. Kumarasamy
188	Thiruvidamarudur	INC	N. Panneer Selvam	DMK	S. Ramalingam
189	Thirumayam	ADMK	S. Regupathy	TMK	Erama Govindarasan
190	Kolathur (SC)	ADMK	C. Kulandaivelu	TMK	V. Raju
191	Pudukkottai	INC	C. Swaminathan	DMK	V. N. Mani
192	Alangudi	ADMK	S. Shanmuganathan	DMK	S. Chirtrarasu
193	Arantangi	ADMK	Kuzha Chelliah	TMK	Su. Thirunavukkarasar
194	Tiruppattur	ADMK	Raja Kannappan	DMK	S. Seventhiappan
195	Karaikudi	ADMK	M. Karpagam	DMK	C. T. Chidambaram
196	Tiruvadanai	INC	Ramasamy Ambalam	JD	Sornalingam
197	Ilayangudi	ADMK	Ma. Sa. Ma. Ramachandran	DMK	N. Nallasethupathi
198	Sivaganga	ADMK	K. R. Muruganandam	DMK	B. Manoharan
199	Manamadurai (SC)	ADMK	V. M. Subramanian	DMK	K. Kasilingam
200	Paramakudi (SC)	ADMK	S. Sundararaj	CPI	N. Chandran
201	Ramanathapuram	ADMK	M. Thennavan	DMK	M. A. Kader
202	Kadaladi	ADMK	V. Sathiamoorthy	DMK	K. Kalimuthu
203	Mudukulathur	INC	S. Balakrishnan	TMK	K. Murugan
204	Aruppukottai	ADMK	V. G. Manimeghalai	DMK	R. M. Shanmuga Sundaram
205	Sattur	ADMK	Sannasi Karuppasamy	TMK	Sattur Ramachandran
206	Virudhunagar	ICS	Sanjay Ramasamy	JD	G. Veerasamy
207	Sivakasi	ADMK	J. Balagangadharan	DMK	B. Boopathi Rajaram
208	Srivilliputhur	ADMK	R. Vinayagamoorthi	CPI	R. Venkadasami
209	Rajapalayam (SC)	ADMK	T. Sathiah	TMK	K. Dhanushkodi
210	Vilathikulam	ADMK	N. C. Kanagavalli	DMK	S. Mavelraj
211	Pottapidaram (SC)	ADMK	S. X. Rajamannar	DMK	C. Chelladurai
212	Koilpatti	ADMK	R. Shyamala	CPI	L. Ayyalusamy
213	Sankaranayanarkoil (SC)	ADMK	V. Gopalakrishnan	DMK	S. Thangavelu
214	Vasudevanallur (SC)	INC	R. Eswaran	CPI(M)	R. Krishnan
215	Kadayanallur	ADMK	S. Nagoor Meeran	DMK	Samsudeen
216	Tenkasi	INC	S. Peter Alphonse	DMK	S. Ramakrishnan
217	Alangulam	INC	S. S. Ramasubbu	DMK	S. Gurunathan
218	Tirunelveli	ADMK	D. Veliah	DMK	A. L. Subramanian
219	Palayamcottai	ADMK	P. Dharamalingam	TMK	V. Karuppasamy Pandian
220	Cheranmahadevi	ADMK	R. Puthunainar Adithan	IND	P. H. Pandian
221	Ambasamudram	ADMK	R. Murugaiah Pandian	CPI(M)	S. Chellappa
222	Nanguneri	ADMK	V. Paulraj Natesan	DMK	M. Mani Achiyur
223	Radhapuram	INC	Ramani Nallathambi	DMK	N. Sargunaraj
224	Sattangulam	INC	Kumari Ananthan	JD	M. A. Ganesa Pandiyan
225	Tiruchendur	ADMK	A. Chelladurai	DMK	A. S. Pandian
226	Srivaikuntam	INC	S. Daniel Raj	DMK	S. David Selvyn
227	Tuticorin	ADMK	V. P. R. Ramesh	DMK	N. Periasamy
228	Kanniyakumari	ADMK	M. Ammamuthu Pillai	DMK	C. Krishnan
229	Nagercoil	INC	M. Moses	DMK	S. Retnaraj
230	Colachel	INC	A. Pauliah	JD	R. Bathakbishnan
231	Padmanabhapuram	ADMK	K. Lawrence	CPI(M)	S. Noor Mohammad
232	Thiruvattar	INC	R. Nadesan	CPI(M)	J. Hemachandran
233	Vilavancode	INC	M. Sundardas	CPI(M)	D. Moni
234	Killiyoor	INC	Pon. Robert Singh	JD	D. Kumaradas

== Opinion poll trends ==
During the 1991 election, India Today conducted a poll with MARG, predicting a win for the Jayalalithaa led All India Anna Dravida Munnetra Kazhagam. Tharasu Weekly initially reported a pro-DMK sentiment among voters, attributing it to a sympathy wave following the dismissal of its government in January 1991. However, after the Rajiv assassination, it conducted a fresh survey and reported a complete shift to an anti-DMK wave among the electorate. Following the assassination of Rajiv Gandhi, the AIADMK–Congress alliance went on to secure a landslide victory, exceeding the poll's projections.

== Voting and results ==
The polling for the state assembly elections were held simultaneously with the polling for the 1991 Parliamentary elections on 15 June 1991. The voter turnout was 63.92%.

=== Results by Pre-Poll Alliance ===
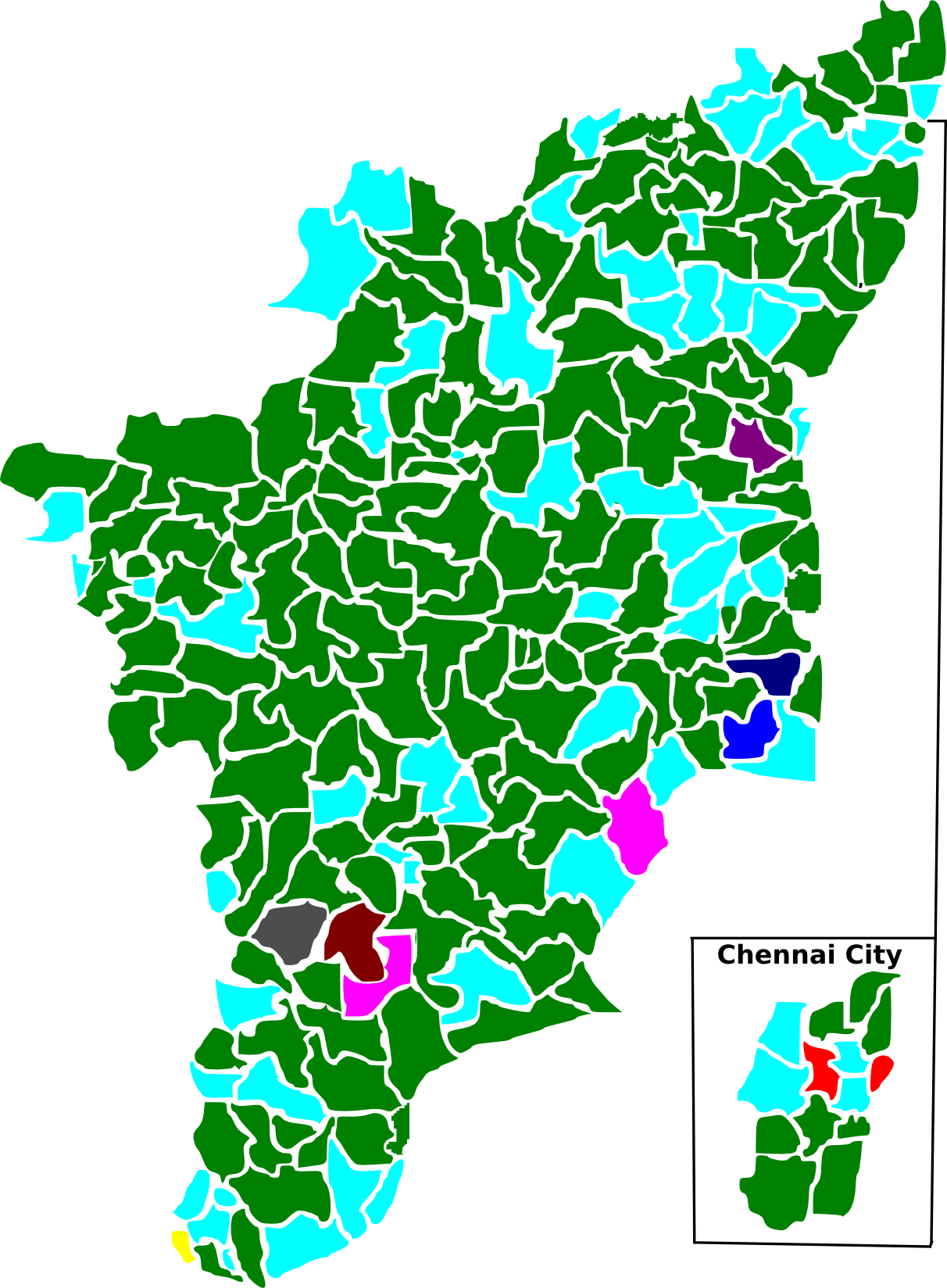
Election map of results based on parties. Colours are based on the results table on the left

Summary of the May 1991 Tamil Nadu Legislative Assembly election results
Alliance/Party	Seats won	Change	Popular Vote	Vote %	Adj. %^{‡}
AIADMK+ alliance	225	+172	14,738,042	59.8%	
AIADMK	164	+137	10,940,966	44.4%	61.1%
INC	60	+34	3,743,859	15.2%	56.2%
ICS(SCS)^{†}	1	+1	53,217	0.2%	56.1%
DMK+ alliance	7	-164	7,405,935	30.0%	
DMK	2	−148	5,535,668	22.5%	29.9%
TMK	2	−1	371,645	1.5%	31.0%
CPI(M)	1	−14	777,532	3.2%	31.2%
JD	1	+1	415,947	1.7%	28.3%
CPI	1	−2	305,143	1.2%	29.9%
Others	2	-8	2,505,431	10.2%	
PMK	1	+1	1,452,982	5.9%	7.0%
JP	0	−4	51,564	0.2%	0.7%
IND	1	−5	390,227	1.6%	1.7%
Total	234	–	24,649,408	100%	–

†: ICS(SCS) contested in 13 different constituencies, but only the one contested by Sanjay Ramaswamy was endorsed by AIADMK.
‡: Vote % reflects the percentage of votes the party received compared to the entire electorate that voted in this election. Adjusted (Adj.) Vote %, reflects the % of votes the party received per constituency that they contested.
Sources: Election Commission of India

=== Results by district ===
District	Seats			
District	Seats	ADK	INC	OTH
Chennai	14	8	4	2
Chengalpattu	17	12	5	—N/a
Vellore	12	7	5	—N/a
Tiruvannamalai	9	7	2	—N/a
South Arcot	21	14	6	1
Dharmapuri	10	6	4	—N/a
Salem	17	14	3	—N/a
Coimbatore	17	14	3	—N/a
Erode	8	8	—N/a	—N/a
Nilgiris	3	2	1	—N/a
Dindigul	7	5	2	—N/a
Tiruchirapalli	18	15	3	—N/a
Thanjavur	20	13	5	2
Pudukottai	5	3	1	1
Sivaganga	6	5	1	—N/a
Ramanathapuram	4	3	1	—N/a
Virudhunagar	6	3	—N/a	3
Madurai	15	11	4	—N/a
Thoothukudi	7	5	2	—N/a
Tirunelveli	11	7	4	—N/a
Kanyakumari	7	2	4	1
Total	234	164	60	10 (Note: The 10 "OTH (Other)" seats in this election were won by the following parties: Thayaga Marumalarchi Kazhagam–2; Dravida Munnetra Kazhagam–2; Pattali Makkal Katchi–1; Janata Dal–1; Communist Party of India (Marxist)–1; Communist Party of India–1; Indian Congress (Socialist)–1; Independent–1)

== Constituency wise results ==
Constituency		Winner				Runner Up				Margin	%
#	Name	Candidate	Party	Votes	%	Candidate	Party	Votes	%	Margin	%
1	Royapuram	D. Jayakumar	ADMK	46,218	59.04	R. Mathivanan	DMK	29,565	37.77	16,653	21.27
2	Harbour	M. Karunanidhi	DMK	30,932	48.66	K. Suppu	INC	30,042	47.26	890	1.40
3	R. K. Nagar	E. Madhusudhanan	ADMK	66,710	60.30	V. Rajasekaran	JD	41,758	37.74	24,952	22.56
4	Park Town	U. Balaraman	INC	37,747	55.05	A. Rahman Khan	DMK	25,912	37.79	11,835	17.26
5	Perambur (SC)	M. P. Sekar	ADMK	62,759	54.06	Chengai Sivam	DMK	47,307	40.75	15,452	13.31
6	Purasawalkam	B. Ranganathan	INC	71,391	55.78	N. Veeraswami	DMK	48,559	37.94	22,832	17.84
7	Egmore (SC)	Parithi Ilamvazhuthi	DMK	23,139	50.47	D. Yasodha	INC	21,936	47.84	1,203	2.63
8	Anna Nagar	A. Chellakumar	INC	75,512	57.29	S. M. Ramachandran	DMK	48,214	36.58	27,298	20.71
9	Theagaraya Nagar	S. Jayakumar	ADMK	64,460	61.19	S. A. Ganesan	DMK	33,147	31.47	31,313	29.72
10	Thousand Lights	K. A. Krishnaswamy	ADMK	55,426	56.50	M. K. Stalin	DMK	38,445	39.19	16,981	17.31
11	Chepauk	Zeenath Sheriffdeen	INC	29,605	50.62	K. Anbazhagan	DMK	25,149	43.00	4,456	7.62
12	Triplicane	Md. Asif	ADMK	39,028	55.07	Nanjil K. Manoharan	DMK	26,576	37.50	12,452	17.57
13	Mylapore	T. M. Rangarajan	ADMK	62,845	59.31	Nirmala Suresh	DMK	36,149	34.12	26,696	25.19
14	Saidapet	M. K. Balan	ADMK	63,235	57.37	R. S. Sridhar	DMK	40,473	36.72	22,762	20.65
15	Gummidipundi	R. Sakkubai	ADMK	61,063	54.77	K. Venu	DMK	28,144	25.24	32,919	29.53
16	Ponneri (SC)	E. Ravikumar	ADMK	77,374	64.74	K. Parthasarathy	DMK	36,121	30.22	41,253	34.52
17	Thiruvottiyur	K. Kuppan	ADMK	85,823	56.54	T. K. Pallanisamy	DMK	58,501	38.54	27,322	18.00
18	Villivakkam	E. Kalan	INC	1,18,196	55.49	W. R. Varadarajan	CPI(M)	71,963	33.79	46,233	21.70
19	Alandur	S. Annamalai	ADMK	88,432	58.45	Pammal Nallathambi	DMK	53,521	35.37	34,911	23.08
20	Tambaram	S. M. Krishnan	INC	1,11,588	57.82	M. A. Vaidiallingam	DMK	64,740	33.54	46,848	24.28
21	Tirupporur (SC)	M. Dhanapal	ADMK	60,262	56.55	G. Chockalingam	DMK	29,698	27.87	30,564	28.68
22	Chengalpattu	C. D. Vardarajan	ADMK	51,694	48.65	V. Tamilmani	DMK	34,896	32.84	16,798	15.81
23	Maduranthakam	P. Chockalingam	ADMK	53,752	54.11	S. D. Ogamchand	TMK	35,349	35.59	18,403	18.52
24	Acharapakkam (SC)	M. Ramakrishnan	ADMK	52,494	56.30	M. Jayapal	DMK	27,769	29.78	24,725	26.52
25	Uthiramerur	Kanchi Panneerselvam	ADMK	63,367	55.46	K. Sundar	DMK	29,273	25.62	34,094	29.84
26	Kancheepuram	C. P. Pattabiraman	ADMK	66,429	56.03	P. Murugesan	DMK	39,163	33.03	27,266	23.00
27	Sriperumbudur (SC)	Polur Varadhan	INC	63,656	60.95	E. Godandam	DMK	31,220	29.89	32,436	31.06
28	Poonamallee	D. Sudarsanam	INC	68,392	55.50	D. Rajarathanam	DMK	44,240	35.90	24,152	19.60
29	Tiruvallur	D. Sakkubai Devaraj	ADMK	54,267	56.91	C. Subramani	DMK	27,847	29.20	26,420	27.71
30	Tiruttani	K. Rasanbabu	ADMK	50,037	53.20	C. Chinrajeevulu Naidu	JD	27,845	29.61	22,192	23.59
31	Pallipet	A. Eakambara Reddy	INC	48,516	50.24	L. S. Annamalai	IND	17,776	18.41	30,740	31.83
32	Arkonam (SC)	Lata Priyakumar	INC	61,314	55.24	G. Mani	DMK	30,332	27.33	30,982	27.91
33	Sholinghur	A. M. Munirathinam	INC	58,563	53.90	C. Manickam	DMK	24,453	22.51	34,110	31.39
34	Ranipet	N. G. Venugopal	ADMK	65,204	53.29	M. Abdul Latheef	DMK	32,332	26.42	32,872	26.87
35	Arcot	G. Viswanathan	ADMK	61,712	61.16	T. R. Gajapathi	DMK	27,439	27.20	34,273	33.96
36	Katpadi	K. M. Kalaiselvi	ADMK	63,005	56.43	Duraimurugan	DMK	36,866	33.02	26,139	23.41
37	Gudiyatham	V. Dhandayudapani	INC	63,796	64.41	R. Paramasivam	CPI(M)	28,897	29.17	34,899	35.24
38	Pernambut (SC)	J. Parandaman	ADMK	67,398	67.54	V. Govindan	DMK	24,900	24.95	42,498	42.59
39	Vaniayambadi	E. Sampath	INC	53,354	54.98	A. Abdul Hameed	DMK	33,523	34.54	19,831	20.44
40	Natrampalli	R. Indrakumari	ADMK	81,446	68.05	N. K. Raja	DMK	33,917	28.34	47,529	39.71
41	Tiruppattur	A. K. C. Sundarvel	ADMK	69,402	62.24	B. Sundaram	DMK	33,498	30.04	35,904	32.20
42	Chengam (SC)	P. Veera Pandiyan	ADMK	54,611	59.31	K. Munusamy	JD	16,994	18.46	37,617	40.85
43	Thandarambattu	M. K. Sundaram	ADMK	69,433	64.26	D. Ponmudi	DMK	32,570	30.14	36,863	34.12
44	Tiruvannamalai	V. Kannan	INC	67,034	58.94	K. Pitchandi	DMK	38,115	33.51	28,919	25.43
45	Kalasapakkam	M. Sundarasami	INC	65,096	57.35	P. S. Thiruvengadam	DMK	32,152	28.33	32,944	29.02
46	Polur	T. Vediyappan	ADMK	60,262	62.13	A. Rejendran	DMK	21,637	22.31	38,625	39.82
47	Anaicut	K. Dharamalingam	ADMK	54,413	57.59	S. P. Kannan	DMK	18,880	19.98	35,533	37.61
48	Vellore	C. Gnanasekaran	INC	60,698	58.30	A. M. Ramalingam	DMK	37,632	36.15	23,066	22.15
49	Arni	I. R. Jaison Jacob	ADMK	66,355	58.51	E. Selvarasu	DMK	32,043	28.26	34,312	30.25
50	Cheyyar	A. Devaraj	ADMK	66,061	60.59	V. Anbazhagan	DMK	30,106	27.61	35,955	32.98
51	Vandavasi (SC)	C.K. Thamazharasan	ADMK	55,990	53.34	V. Rajagopal	DMK	26,496	25.24	29,494	28.10
52	Peranamallur	A.K. Srinivasan	ADMK	56,653	54.55	G. Subramaniyan	DMK	29,481	28.39	27,172	26.16
53	Melmalayanur	G. Janakiramam	INC	56,864	52.95	R. Panchatcharam	DMK	30,372	28.28	26,492	24.67
54	Gingee	S.S.R. Eramasass	INC	57,390	51.75	N. Ramachandaran	DMK	33,916	30.58	23,474	21.17
55	Tindivanam	S. Pannirselvam	INC	48,317	50.58	R. Masilamani	DMK	29,282	30.65	19,035	19.93
56	Vanur (SC)	S. Arumugam	ADMK	60,128	56.30	N.V. Jayaseelan	DMK	23,659	22.15	36,469	34.15
57	Kandamangalam (SC)	V. Subramaniam	ADMK	60,628	57.16	S. Alaguvelu	DMK	25,348	23.90	35,280	33.26
58	Villupuram	D. Janaardhanan	ADMK	55,105	48.82	K. Ponmudy	DMK	37,665	33.37	17,440	15.45
59	Mugaiyur	R. Savithiri Ammal	ADMK	56,118	55.91	A.G. Sampath	DMK	30,698	30.58	25,420	25.33
60	Thirunavalur	J. Panneerselvam	ADMK	56,353	58.80	A.V. Balasubramaniyam	DMK	28,367	29.60	27,986	29.20
61	Ulundurpet (SC)	M. Anandan	ADMK	71,785	65.19	Pon Mayilvahanan	DMK	26,500	24.06	45,285	41.13
62	Nellikuppam	C. Damotharan	ADMK	57,373	59.61	C. Govindarajan	CPI(M)	22,265	23.13	35,108	36.48
63	Cuddalore	P.R.S. Venkatesan	INC	51,459	48.60	E. Pugazhendhi	DMK	36,284	34.27	15,175	14.33
64	Panruti	S. Ramachandaran	PMK	39,911	37.51	R. Devasundaram	ADMK	38,789	36.45	1,122	1.06
65	Kurinjipadi	K. Sivasubramanian	ADMK	51,313	46.92	N. Ganeshmoorthy	DMK	38,842	35.52	12,471	11.40
66	Bhuvanagiri	G. Malliga	ADMK	48,164	46.38	R.T. Sabapathy Mohan	DMK	27,530	26.51	20,634	19.87
67	Kattumannarkoil (SC)	N.R. Rajendiran	ADMK	48,103	52.11	G. Vetriveeran	PMK	21,785	23.60	26,318	28.51
68	Chidambaram	K. S. Alagiri	INC	48,767	51.20	M. R. K. Panneerselvam	DMK	29,114	30.57	19,653	20.63
69	Vridhachalam	R.D. Aranganathan	ADMK	51,931	45.05	Rajendiran	PMK	37,634	32.65	14,297	12.40
70	Mangalore (SC)	S. Puratchimani	INC	62,302	55.63	C. V. Ganesan	DMK	26,549	23.71	35,753	31.92
71	Rishivandiam	M. Govindasraju	ADMK	58,030	61.56	M. Thangam	DMK	24,899	26.41	33,131	35.15
72	Chinnasalem	R.P. Paramasivam	ADMK	66,942	64.43	R. Mookkappan	DMK	27,900	26.85	39,042	37.58
73	Sankarapuram	C. Ramaswamy	ADMK	71,688	68.06	S. Arunachalam	DMK	26,610	25.26	45,078	42.80
74	Hosur	K.A. Manoharan	INC	47,346	47.64	B. Venkataswamy	JD	38,600	38.84	8,746	8.80
75	Thalli	M. Venkataramareddy	INC	38,831	45.88	V. Rangareddy	BJP	28,270	33.41	10,561	12.47
76	Kaveripattinam	K.P. Munusamy	ADMK	70,136	69.67	V.C. Govindasamy	DMK	22,900	22.75	47,236	46.92
77	Krishnagiri	K. Munivektatappan	ADMK	63,729	69.92	T.H. Musta Ahmed	DMK	23,761	26.07	39,968	43.85
78	Bargur	J. Jayalalitha	ADMK	67,680	65.18	T. Rajhendher	TMK	30,465	29.34	37,215	35.84
79	Harur (SC)	P. Abaranji	INC	66,636	58.56	P.V. Kariyamal	PMK	24,172	21.24	42,464	37.32
80	Morappur	K. Singaram	ADMK	53,477	53.29	A. Arunachalam	PMK	23,973	23.89	29,504	29.40
81	Palacode	M.G. Sekhar	ADMK	63,170	62.17	K. Arunachalam	JD	23,911	23.53	39,259	38.64
82	Dharmapuri	P. Ponnusamy	INC	53,910	51.11	R. Chinnasamy	DMK	27,017	25.61	26,893	25.50
83	Pennagaram	V. Purushothaman	ADMK	49,585	51.79	N.M. Subramaniam	PMK	30,757	32.12	18,828	19.67
84	Mettur	S. Sundarambal	ADMK	53,368	49.30	G.K. Mani	PMK	26,825	24.78	26,543	24.52
85	Taramangalam	R. Palanisamy	INC	50,538	47.66	S. Ammasi	PMK	42,204	39.80	8,334	7.86
86	Omalur	C. Krishnan	ADMK	60,783	65.78	K. Sadasivam	PMK	23,430	25.36	37,353	40.42
87	Yercaud (ST)	C. Perumal	ADMK	59,324	72.33	Dhanakodi Vedan	DMK	13,745	16.76	45,579	55.57
88	Salem-I	S.R. Jayaraman	INC	72,792	65.97	G.K. Subash	DMK	31,698	28.73	41,094	37.24
89	Salem-II	M. Natesan	ADMK	66,904	63.90	S. Arumugam	DMK	26,997	25.79	39,907	38.11
90	Veerapandi	K. Arjunan	ADMK	79,725	68.12	P. Venkatachalam	DMK	23,451	20.04	56,274	48.08
91	Panamarathupatty	K. Rajaram	ADMK	70,025	69.12	S.R. Sivalingam	DMK	19,670	19.42	50,355	49.70
92	Attur	V. Tamilarasu	ADMK	61,060	64.49	A.M. Ramasamy	DMK	24,475	25.85	36,585	38.64
93	Talavasal (SC)	K. Kandasamy	INC	74,204	73.74	S. Gunasekaran	DMK	20,757	20.63	53,447	53.11
94	Rasipuram	K. Palaniammal	ADMK	75,855	72.15	B.A.R. Elangoavan	DMK	25,625	24.37	50,230	47.78
95	Sendamangalam (ST)	K. Chinnasamy	ADMK	72,877	76.19	S. Sivappirakasam	TMK	17,316	18.10	55,561	58.09
96	Namakkal (SC)	S. Anbalagan	ADMK	79,683	70.72	R. Mayavan	DMK	29,788	26.44	49,895	44.28
97	Kapilamalai	P. Saraswathi	ADMK	72,903	67.03	S. Moorthy	DMK	29,050	26.71	43,853	40.32
98	Tiruchengode	T.M. Selvaganapathi	ADMK	1,13,545	74.10	V. Ramasamy	CPI(M)	34,886	22.77	78,659	51.33
99	Sankari (SC)	V. Saroja	ADMK	79,039	70.01	R. Varadarajan	DMK	27,080	23.99	51,959	46.02
100	Edappadi	Edappadi K. Palaniswami	ADMK	72,379	58.24	P. Kolandai Gounder	PMK	31,113	25.03	41,266	33.21
101	Mettupalayam	L. Sulochana	ADMK	72,912	60.82	B. Arunkumar	DMK	31,173	26.01	41,739	34.81
102	Avanashi (SC)	M. Seeniammal	ADMK	69,774	69.67	M. Arumugham	CPI	23,625	23.59	46,149	46.08
103	Thondamuthur	C. Aranganayagam	ADMK	92,362	61.95	U.K. Vellingiri	CPI(M)	45,218	30.33	47,144	31.62
104	Singanallur	P. Govindaraj	ADMK	68,069	55.46	R. Sengaliappan	JD	46,099	37.56	21,970	17.90
105	Coimbatore West	K. Selvaraj	INC	41,194	51.08	M. Ramanathan	DMK	24,696	30.63	16,498	20.45
106	Coimbatore East	V.K. Lakshmanan	INC	46,544	55.56	K.C. Karunakaran	CPI(M)	29,019	34.64	17,525	20.92
107	Perur	K.P. Raju	ADMK	76,676	57.55	A. Natarasan	DMK	47,017	35.29	29,659	22.26
108	Kinathukkadavu	N.S. Palanisamy	ADMK	64,358	65.88	K. Kandasamy	DMK	31,792	32.54	32,566	33.34
109	Pollachi	V.P. Chandrasekar	ADMK	72,736	63.32	M. N. Andu	DMK	40,195	34.99	32,541	28.33
110	Valparai (SC)	A. Sridharan	ADMK	55,284	60.71	A.T. Karuppaiah	CPI	34,100	37.45	21,184	23.26
111	Udumalpet	K.P. Manivasagam	ADMK	75,262	60.42	R.T. Mariappan	DMK	44,990	36.12	30,272	24.30
112	Dharapuram (SC)	P. Eswaramurthi	ADMK	66,490	65.49	T. Shanthakumari	DMK	28,545	28.11	37,945	37.38
113	Vellakoil	Dhurai Ramaswammy	ADMK	68,225	62.85	Subbulakshmi Jegadeesan	DMK	38,638	35.59	29,587	27.26
114	Pongalur	Balasubramaniam	INC	64,588	67.09	P. Vijayalakshmi	DMK	23,526	24.44	41,062	42.65
115	Palladam	K.S. Duraimurugan	ADMK	69,803	61.03	M. Kannappan	DMK	37,079	32.42	32,724	28.61
116	Tiruppur	V. Palanisamy	ADMK	92,509	57.92	C. Govindasamy	CPI(M)	55,868	34.98	36,641	22.94
117	Kangayam	J. Jayalalitha	ADMK	69,050	63.44	N. S. Rajkumar	DMK	35,759	32.85	33,291	30.59
118	Modakurichi	Kavinilavu Dharmaraj	ADMK	78,653	61.98	K. Elanchezhian	DMK	42,178	33.24	36,475	28.74
119	Perundurai	V. N. Subramanian	ADMK	77,277	70.28	T.K. Naliappan	CPI	24,060	21.88	53,217	48.40
120	Erode	C. Manickam	ADMK	96,226	63.11	A. Ganeshamurthy	DMK	52,538	34.46	43,688	28.65
121	Bhavani	S. Muthusamy	ADMK	61,337	61.24	M.C. Duraisamy	DMK	20,867	20.84	40,470	40.40
122	Andhiyur (SC)	V. Periasamy	ADMK	52,592	59.68	Eradharukmani	DMK	21,530	24.43	31,062	35.25
123	Gobichettipalayam	K.A. Sengottayan	ADMK	66,423	68.18	V.P. Shanmogasundaram	DMK	27,211	27.93	39,212	40.25
124	Bhavanisagar	V.K. Chinnasamy	ADMK	63,474	62.74	O. Subramaniam	DMK	20,887	20.65	42,587	42.09
125	Sathyamangalam	A.T. Saraswathi	ADMK	63,739	67.21	T.K. Subramaniam	DMK	26,801	28.26	36,938	38.95
126	Coonoor (SC)	M. Karuppusamy	ADMK	53,608	59.40	E.M. Mahaliappan	DMK	31,457	34.86	22,151	24.54
127	Ootacamund	H.M. Raju	INC	53,389	60.79	H. Natraj	DMK	27,502	31.31	25,887	29.48
128	Gudalur	K.R. Raju	ADMK	54,766	48.46	T.P. Kamalatchan	CPI(M)	42,460	37.57	12,306	10.89
129	Palani (SC)	A. Subburathinam	ADMK	70,404	68.14	V. Balasekar	CPI(M)	30,591	29.61	39,813	38.53
130	Oddanchatram	A.T. Chellamuthu	ADMK	72,669	69.83	T. Mohan	DMK	30,205	29.02	42,464	40.81
131	Periyakulam	M. Periyaveeran	ADMK	70,760	67.45	L. Mookiah	DMK	28,718	27.37	42,042	40.08
132	Theni	V. R. Nedunchezhiyan	ADMK	67,739	61.51	L.S.R. Krishnan	DMK	26,439	24.01	41,300	37.50
133	Bodinayakkanur	V. Panneer Selvam	ADMK	63,297	62.98	G. Ponnu Pillai	DMK	26,253	26.12	37,044	36.86
134	Cumbum	O.R. Ramachandaran	INC	59,263	57.21	P. Eramar	DMK	35,060	33.84	24,203	23.37
135	Andipatti	K. Thavasi	ADMK	66,110	64.25	P. Asaiyan	DMK	23,843	23.17	42,267	41.08
136	Sedapatti	R. Muthiah	ADMK	52,627	58.85	A. Athiyaman	DMK	28,158	31.49	24,469	27.36
137	Thirumangalam	T.K. Radhakrishnan	ADMK	62,774	64.87	R. Saminathan	DMK	31,511	32.56	31,263	32.31
138	Usilampatti	R. Pandiammal	ADMK	41,654	50.30	P.N. Vallarasu	FBL	38,460	46.44	3,194	3.86
139	Nilakottai (SC)	A.S. Ponnammal	INC	62,110	65.75	M. Arivazhagan	DMK	25,050	26.52	37,060	39.23
140	Sholavandan	A.M. Paramasivan	ADMK	66,100	67.34	A.M.M. Ambikapathy	DMK	30,787	31.36	35,313	35.98
141	Tirupparankundram	S. Andi Thevar	ADMK	83,180	59.60	C. Ramachandran	DMK	52,923	37.92	30,257	21.68
142	Madurai West	S.V. Shanmugam	INC	59,586	63.35	Ponmuthuramalingam	DMK	32,664	34.73	26,922	28.62
143	Madurai Central	A. Deivanayagam	INC	47,325	62.27	M. Tamilkudimagan	DMK	26,717	35.16	20,608	27.11
144	Madurai East	O.S. Amarnath	ADMK	50,336	64.00	P.M. Kumar	CPI(M)	20,248	25.74	30,088	38.26
145	Samayanallur (SC)	M. Kalirajan	ADMK	93,161	69.98	N. Soundrapandian	DMK	37,705	28.32	55,456	41.66
146	Melur	K. V. V. Rajamanickam	INC	80,348	72.33	N. Palanisamy	CPI(M)	27,576	24.82	52,772	47.51
147	Natham	M. Andi Ambalam	INC	71,902	73.02	P. Cheliam	DMK	24,124	24.50	47,778	48.52
148	Dindigul	B. Nirmala	ADMK	80,795	64.00	S.A. Thangarajan	CPI(M)	36,791	29.14	44,004	34.86
149	Athoor	S.M. Durai	ADMK	81,394	68.74	I. Periyasamy	DMK	35,297	29.81	46,097	38.93
150	Vedasandur	S. Gandhirajan	ADMK	94,937	76.47	P. Muthusamy	DMK	27,847	22.43	67,090	54.04
151	Aravakurichi	Mariyamul Asia	ADMK	57,957	55.60	P. Monjanur Ramasamy	DMK	37,005	35.50	20,952	20.10
152	Karur	M. Chinnasamy	ADMK	89,351	64.69	M. Vasuki	DMK	45,259	32.77	44,092	31.92
153	Krishnarayapuram (SC)	A. Arivalagan	ADMK	80,676	76.04	R. Natarajan	DMK	24,240	22.85	56,436	53.19
154	Marungapuri	K. Ponnusamy	ADMK	76,476	66.88	N. Selvaraj	DMK	34,572	30.23	41,904	36.65
155	Kulithalai	A. Pappa Sundaram	ADMK	80,499	69.83	S. P. Sethiraman	DMK	33,158	28.76	47,341	41.07
156	Thottiam	N. R. Sivapathi	ADMK	79,594	73.51	K. Kannaiyan	DMK	26,868	24.81	52,726	48.70
157	Uppiliapuram (ST)	V. Ravichandaran	ADMK	69,748	67.46	M. Sundravadanam	DMK	32,392	31.33	37,356	36.13
158	Musiri	M. Thangavel	ADMK	70,812	62.83	R. Natarasan	DMK	39,568	35.11	31,244	27.72
159	Lalgudi	J. Logambal	INC	65,742	54.88	K. N. Nheru	DMK	52,225	43.59	13,517	11.29
160	Perambalur (SC)	T. Sezhian	ADMK	76,202	70.69	M. Devarajan	DMK	25,868	24.00	50,334	46.69
161	Varahur (SC)	E. T. Ponnuvelu	ADMK	59,384	57.70	C. Thiyagarajan	DMK	31,155	30.27	28,229	27.43
162	Ariyalur	S. Manimegalai	ADMK	64,680	57.00	K. Chinnappa	DMK	41,551	36.62	23,129	20.38
163	Andimadam	R. Thangarajulk	INC	40,816	42.19	M. Gnanamoorthy	PMK	33,144	34.26	7,672	7.93
164	Jayankondam	K. K. Chinnappan	INC	49,406	44.69	S. Durairaju	PMK	33,238	30.06	16,168	14.63
165	Srirangam	P. A. Krishnan	ADMK	82,462	70.51	R. Jayabalan	JD	30,918	26.44	51,544	44.07
166	Tiruchirapalli-I	S. Arokiasamy	ADMK	42,774	56.68	A. Malaramannan	DMK	27,839	36.89	14,935	19.79
167	Tiruchirapalli-II	G. R. Mala Selvi	ADMK	54,664	57.18	Anbil Poyyamozhi	DMK	34,120	35.69	20,544	21.49
168	Thiruverambur	T. Rathinavel	ADMK	69,596	59.76	Pappa Umanath	CPI(M)	43,074	36.99	26,522	22.77
169	Sirkali (SC)	T. Moorthy	ADMK	62,321	61.29	M. Pannerselvam	DMK	28,337	27.87	33,984	33.42
170	Poompuhar	M. Poorasamy	ADMK	52,478	53.47	M. Mohamed Siddik	DMK	33,107	33.74	19,371	19.73
171	Mayuram	M. M. S. Abul Hassan	INC	54,516	55.34	A. Senguttivan	DMK	31,208	31.68	23,308	23.66
172	Kuttalam	S. Asaimani	ADMK	60,617	57.02	Ko. Si. Mani	DMK	37,866	35.62	22,751	21.40
173	Nannilam (SC)	K. Gopal	ADMK	60,623	56.79	M. Manimaran	DMK	43,415	40.67	17,208	16.12
174	Tiruvarur (SC)	V. Thambusamy	CPI(M)	55,653	51.22	M. Ramasamy	INC	50,406	46.39	5,247	4.83
175	Nagapattinam	R. Kodimari	ADMK	53,050	52.20	G. Veerajyan	CPI(M)	43,116	42.42	9,934	9.78
176	Vedaranyam	P. V. Rajendran	INC	55,957	49.22	M. Meenashi Sundaram	DMK	39,089	34.39	16,868	14.83
177	Tiruthuraipundi (SC)	G. Palanisamy	CPI	62,863	53.58	V. Vedaiyan	INC	50,797	43.30	12,066	10.28
178	Mannargudi	K. Srinivasan	ADMK	58,194	52.32	V. Veerasenan	CPI	50,798	45.67	7,396	6.65
179	Pattukkottai	K. Balasubramaniam	ADMK	67,764	62.07	K. Annadurai	DMK	39,028	35.75	28,736	26.32
180	Peravurani	R. Singaram	INC	77,504	67.56	M. R. Govendhan	DMK	32,962	28.73	44,542	38.83
181	Orathanad	Alaguthirunavukkabasu	ADMK	68,208	58.75	L. Ganesan	DMK	47,328	40.77	20,880	17.98
182	Thiruvonam	K. Thangamuthu	ADMK	75,141	64.73	M. Ramachandran	DMK	40,173	34.61	34,968	30.12
183	Thanjavur	S. D. Somasundaram	ADMK	64,363	58.65	S. N. M. Ubayadullah	DMK	44,502	40.55	19,861	18.10
184	Tiruvaiyaru	P. Kalaiperumal	ADMK	57,648	59.68	Durai Chandrasekaran	DMK	37,249	38.56	20,399	21.12
185	Papanasam	S. Rajaraman	INC	54,445	56.14	S. Kalayanasundaram	DMK	32,520	33.53	21,925	22.61
186	Valangiman (SC)	K. Panchavarnam	ADMK	58,504	64.59	S. Senthamil Chelvan	DMK	30,816	34.02	27,688	30.57
187	Kumbakonam	R. Eramanathan	ADMK	67,271	65.15	S. Kumarasamy	JD	30,962	29.99	36,309	35.16
188	Thiruvidamarudur	N. Panneerselvam	INC	62,523	56.24	S. Ramalingam	DMK	37,392	33.64	25,131	22.60
189	Thirumayam	S. Regupathy	ADMK	72,701	70.38	Erama Govindarasan	TMK	27,970	27.08	44,731	43.30
190	Kolathur (SC)	C. Kulandaivelu	ADMK	91,350	76.51	V. Raju	TMK	26,038	21.81	65,312	54.70
191	Pudukkottai	C. Swaminathan	INC	82,205	66.44	V. N. Mani	DMK	38,806	31.36	43,399	35.08
192	Alangudi	S. Shanmuganathan	ADMK	88,684	68.83	S. Chirtrarasu	DMK	38,983	30.26	49,701	38.57
193	Arantangi	S. Thirunavukkarasu	TMK	73,571	56.46	Kuzha Chelliah	ADMK	52,150	40.02	21,421	16.44
194	Tiruppattur	S. Kannappan	ADMK	63,297	66.06	S. Seventhiappan	DMK	31,841	33.23	31,456	32.83
195	Karaikudi	M. Karpagam	ADMK	71,912	65.68	C. T. Chidambaram	DMK	33,601	30.69	38,311	34.99
196	Tiruvadanai	Ramasamy Ambalam	INC	65,723	62.92	Sornalingam	JD	35,187	33.68	30,536	29.24
197	Ilayangudi	M. S. M. Ramachandran	ADMK	52,994	61.92	N. Nallasethupathi	DMK	28,864	33.73	24,130	28.19
198	Sivaganga	K. R. Muruganandam	ADMK	69,506	72.69	B. Manoharan	DMK	23,635	24.72	45,871	47.97
199	Manamadurai (SC)	V. M. Subramanian	ADMK	66,823	69.77	K. Kasilingam	DMK	28,535	29.79	38,288	39.98
200	Paramakudi (SC)	S. Sundararaj	ADMK	63,577	66.72	N. Chandran	CPI	25,111	26.35	38,466	40.37
201	Ramanathapuram	M. Thennavan	ADMK	62,004	59.00	M. A. Kader	DMK	31,635	30.10	30,369	28.90
202	Kadaladi	V. Sathiamoorthy	ADMK	56,552	55.65	K. Kalimuthu	DMK	27,098	26.67	29,454	28.98
203	Mudukulathur	S. Balakrishnan	INC	40,065	41.74	B. John Pandian	PMK	29,021	30.24	11,044	11.50
204	Aruppukottai	V. G. Manimeghalai	ADMK	56,985	58.91	R. M. Shanmuga Sundaram	DMK	37,066	38.32	19,919	20.59
205	Sattur	S. Ramachandran	TMK	59,942	48.63	Sannasi Karuppasamy	ADMK	57,703	46.81	2,239	1.82
206	Virudhunagar	Sanjay Ramaswamy	ICS	53,217	56.07	G. Veerasamy	JD	33,816	35.63	19,401	20.44
207	Sivakasi	J. Balagangadharan	ADMK	84,785	66.75	B. Boopathi Rajaram	DMK	37,059	29.17	47,726	37.58
208	Srivilliputhur	R. Thamaraikkani	IND	38,908	34.28	R. Vinayagamoorthi	ADMK	37,739	33.25	1,169	1.03
209	Rajapalayam (SC)	T. Sathiah	ADMK	68,657	63.45	K. Dhunuskedi	TMK	37,169	34.35	31,488	29.10
210	Vilathikulam	N. C. Kanagavalli	ADMK	53,713	62.10	S. Mavelraj	DMK	32,004	37.00	21,709	25.10
211	Ottapidaram (SC)	S. X. Rajamannar	ADMK	52,360	66.28	C. Chelladurai	DMK	25,035	31.69	27,325	34.59
212	Koilpatti	R. Shymala	ADMK	58,535	61.81	L. Aiyalusamy	CPI	30,284	31.98	28,251	29.83
213	Sankaranayanarkoil (SC)	V. Gopalakrishnan	ADMK	65,620	61.88	S. Thangavelu	DMK	38,772	36.56	26,848	25.32
214	Vasudevanallur (SC)	R. Eswaran	INC	54,688	58.28	R. Krishnan	CPI(M)	34,374	36.63	20,314	21.65
215	Kadayanallur	S. Nagoormeeran	ADMK	55,681	56.59	S. Kathiravan	DMK	27,971	28.43	27,710	28.16
216	Tenkasi	S. Peter Alphonse	INC	65,142	62.10	S. Ramakrishnan	DMK	28,263	26.94	36,879	35.16
217	Alangulam	S. S. Ramasubbu	INC	66,637	62.69	S. Gurunathan	DMK	35,487	33.39	31,150	29.30
218	Tirunelveli	D. Veliah	ADMK	63,138	62.81	A. L. Subramanian	DMK	32,853	32.68	30,285	30.13
219	Palayamcottai	P. Dharamalingam	ADMK	45,141	46.11	V. Karuppasamy Pandian	TMK	38,250	39.07	6,891	7.04
220	Cheranmahadevi	R. Puthunainar	ADMK	59,358	65.44	P. H. Pandian	IND	24,890	27.44	34,468	38.00
221	Ambasamudram	R. Murugaiah	ADMK	57,433	65.33	S. Chellappa	CPI(M)	28,219	32.10	29,214	33.23
222	Nanguneri	V. Natesan Paulbaj	ADMK	65,514	72.90	M. Mani Achiyur	DMK	21,294	23.69	44,220	49.21
223	Radhapuram	Ramani Nallathambi	INC	51,331	62.83	N. Sargunaraj	DMK	18,600	22.77	32,731	40.06
224	Sattangulam	Kumari Anathan	INC	52,719	72.09	M. A. Ganesa Pandiyan	JD	16,894	23.10	35,825	48.99
225	Tiruchendur	A. Chelladurai	ADMK	54,442	58.63	A. S. Pandian	DMK	27,794	29.93	26,648	28.70
226	Srivaikuntam	S. Daniel Raj	INC	50,800	62.54	S. David Selvin	DMK	23,486	28.91	27,314	33.63
227	Tuticorin	V. P. R. Ramesh	ADMK	79,552	66.09	N. Periasamy	DMK	38,157	31.70	41,395	34.39
228	Kanniyakumari	M. Ammamuthu	ADMK	54,194	60.14	C. Krishnan	DMK	19,835	22.01	34,359	38.13
229	Nagercoil	M. Moses	INC	56,363	56.81	S. Retnaraj	DMK	26,311	26.52	30,052	30.29
230	Colachel	A. Pauliah	INC	52,641	60.01	R. Bathakbishnan	JD	19,626	22.37	33,015	37.64
231	Padmanabhapuram	K. Lawrence	ADMK	42,950	51.85	S. Noor Mohamed	CPI(M)	19,657	23.73	23,293	28.12
232	Thiruvattar	R. Nadesan	INC	45,591	50.49	J. Hemachandran	CPI(M)	28,762	31.86	16,829	18.63
233	Vilavancode	M. Sundaradas	INC	50,151	48.86	D. Mony	CPI(M)	38,842	37.85	11,309	11.01
234	Killiyoor	D. Kumaradas	JD	26,818	34.25	Pon. Robert Singh	INC	25,650	32.76	1,168	1.49

== Analysis ==
The AIADMK coalition won a massive victory in this election capturing 225 of 234 seats. The DMK coalition was routed with only 7 victories. DMK itself could win only 2 seats including that of its leader M. Karunanidhi. Though Karunanidhi won from the Harbour constituency, he resigned his seat immediately. The victory of AIADMK-Congress has been attributed mainly to the sympathy wave following the Rajiv Gandhi assassination. Other factors which helped their victory were the consolidation of the AIADMK votes under the unified AIADMK party, successful projection by Jayalalithaa as the true political heir to M. G. Ramachandran (M.G.R), successful portrayal of DMK as anti-woman (by playing up the events in the Assembly on 25 March 1989) and the PMK cutting into the DMK's vote bank in the northern districts. This election saw the first electoral success of the PMK, when its candidate Panruti Ramachandran was elected from the Panruti constituency.

== Bypolls (1991–1996) ==
Date	Constituency	MLA before election	Party before election	Elected MLA	Party after election
24 August 1991	Harbour	M. Karunanidhi	Dravida Munnetra Kazhagam	A. Selvarasan	Dravida Munnetra Kazhagam
24 August 1991	Kangayam	J. Jayalalitha	All India Anna Dravida Munnetra Kazhagam	R. M. Veerappan	All India Anna Dravida Munnetra Kazhagam
19 August 1993	Ranipet	N. G. Venogopal	All India Anna Dravida Munnetra Kazhagam	K. V. S. Manoharan	All India Anna Dravida Munnetra Kazhagam
26 May 1994	Mylapore	T. M. Rangarajan	All India Anna Dravida Munnetra Kazhagam	V. Balasubramaniyan	All India Anna Dravida Munnetra Kazhagam
26 May 1994	Perundurai	V. N. Subramanian	All India Anna Dravida Munnetra Kazhagam	V. P. Periasamy	All India Anna Dravida Munnetra Kazhagam

== See also ==
- Elections in Tamil Nadu
- Legislature of Tamil Nadu
- Government of Tamil Nadu
