= Arangannal =

Indian politician

Member of Madras Legislative Assembly
- In office 1962 - 1967
- Preceded by: C. R. Ramaswamy
- Succeeded by: A. Varadappa Chettiar
- Constituency: Mylapore
- In office 1967 - 1971
- Succeeded by: V. R. Radhakrishnan
- Constituency: Mylapore

Personal details
- Political party: Dravida Munnetra Kazhagam

Arangannal was an Indian politician and former Member of the Legislative Assembly of Tamil Nadu. He was elected to the Tamil Nadu legislative assembly from Mylapore constituency as a Dravida Munnetra Kazhagam candidate in 1962, and 1967 elections. He was elected from Egmore constituency as a Dravida Munnetra Kazhagam candidate in 1971 election.
