= P. Venkataramanan =

Indian politician (born 1978)

Cabinet Minister Government of Tamil Nadu
- Incumbent
- Assumed office 10 May 2026
- Governor: R. V. Arlekar
- Chief Minister: C. Joseph Vijay
- Ministry and Departments: Food and Civil Supplies
- Preceded by: R. Sakkarapani

Member of the Tamil Nadu Legislative Assembly
- Incumbent
- Assumed office 4 May 2026
- Chief Minister: C. Joseph Vijay
- Preceded by: Dha. Velu
- Constituency: Mylapore

Treasurer of Tamilaga Vettri Kazhagam
- Incumbent
- Assumed office 2025
- Party president: C. Joseph Vijay
- Preceded by: Position Established

Personal details
- Party: Tamilaga Vettri Kazhagam
- Parent: Padmanaaban (father)
- Education: Annamalai University (M.Com); Bangalore University (LLB); Periyar University (MBA)

Padmanaaban Venkataramanan (born 1978) is the Treasurer of Tamilaga Vettri Kazhagam and is a practicing Advocate in Law Association of Saidapet, Tamil Nadu. He is a member of the Tamil Nadu Legislative Assembly from Mylapore Assembly constituency in Chennai district. He was appointed as the minister for food and civil supplies of Tamil Nadu in the C. Joseph Vijay ministry.

== Early life and education ==
Venkataramanan is from Chennai, Tamil Nadu. He is the son of Padmanaaban. He graduated with an M.Com at Annamalai University, an LLB at Bangalore University and an MBA at Periyar University. He was earlier auditor to Vijay's family and close to him. His wife is a trustee of the Sai Vijay Charitable Trust.

== Political career ==
Venkataramanan has been the Treasurer of the Tamilaga Vettri Kazhagam, a party found in 2024 by Joseph Vijay.

According to an interview with The New Indian Express, he characterized TVK as representing a “politics of change” for the people of Tamil Nadu and expressed views that anti-Brahminism is an outdated ideology, arguing that Brahminism — understood as any system of domination and discrimination — no longer exists in contemporary society given the awareness and education of today’s youth.

He became an MLA for the first time winning the 2026 Tamil Nadu Legislative Assembly election from Mylapore Assembly constituency representing Tamilaga Vettri Kazhagam. He won with 70,070 votes, defeating incumbent Dha. Velu of the Dravida Munnetra Kazhagam, by a margin of 28,972 votes.

=== Electoral performance ===
2026 Tamil Nadu Legislative Assembly election: Mylapore
Party	Candidate	Votes	%	±%
TVK	Venkataramanan. P	70,070	46.53	New
DMK	Velu. Dha	41,098	27.29	▼17.66
BJP	Dr. Tamilisai Soundararajan	32,328	21.47	New
NTK	Arun. R.L	4,499	2.99	▼3.66
NOTA	NOTA	770	0.51	▼0.34
Margin of victory		28,972	19.24	▲10.94
Turnout		1,50,594	75.49	▲19.25
Registered electors		1,99,496		▼71,040
TVK gain from DMK		Swing	▲46.53	
