= Bader Sayeed =

Indian politician

Bader Sayeed was elected to the Tamil Nadu Legislative Assembly from the Triplicane constituency in the 2006 elections. She was a candidate of the All India Anna Dravida Munnetra Kazhagam (AIADMK) party.

== Political career ==
She was school mate to former chief minister of Tamil Nadu, J. Jayalalithaa. Bader Sayeed joined AIADMK party. In 2004, She was Contested in Chennai South but she lost in that parliament election. Further In 2006, She contested in Triplicane and defeated writer Naganathan, a friend to former chief minister M. Karunanidhi.

== Electoral result ==
=== 2006 Assembly election ===
2006 Tamil Nadu Legislative Assembly election: Triplicane
Party	Candidate	Votes	%	±%
AIADMK	Bader Sayeed	40,404	47.25%	
DMK	M. Naganathan	37,628	44.01%	−5.78%
DMDK	K. Shivakumar	4,834	5.65%	
BJP	S. Sathish Kumar	1,631	1.91%	
Independent	R. Vivekanandan	319	0.37%	
BSP	K. Saravanan	181	0.21%	
Independent	R. Srinivasan	144	0.17%	
Independent	S. Sasikumar	134	0.16%	
Independent	M. Santhanam	123	0.14%	
Independent	P. Shanmugam	106	0.12%	
Margin of victory		2,776	3.25%	−1.99%
Turnout		85,504	64.52%	21.42%
Registered electors		132,523		
AIADMK gain from DMK		Swing	-2.54%	

=== 2004 General Elections ===
2004 Indian general election: Chennai South
Party	Candidate	Votes	%	±%
DMK	T. R. Baalu	564,578	60.41	0.38
AIADMK	Bader Sayeed	3,43,838	36.79	
Margin of victory		2,20,740	23.62	−2.03
Turnout		9,34,548	47.93	2.77
Rejected ballots		29	0.00	
Registered electors		19,49,904		−5.99
DMK hold		Swing	0.38	
