= Triplicane Assembly constituency =

Former constituency of the Tamil Nadu Legislative assembly, in India

Coordinates: 13.059°N 80.276°E

Triplicane
- Former constituency for the Tamil Nadu Legislative Assembly

Constituency details
- Country: India
- Region: South India
- State: Tamil Nadu
- District: Chennai
- Lok Sabha constituency: Chennai South
- Established: 1951
- Abolished: 2008
- Total electors: 132,523 (2006)
- Reservation: None

Triplicane was the legislative assembly constituency, that included the city of Triplicane. Triplicane Assembly constituency was part of Chennai South Lok Sabha constituency, India. After the constituency delimitation of 2008, this constituency has been merged into the newly-formed Chepauk-Thiruvallikeni Assembly constituency.

== Members of the Legislative Assembly ==
Year	Winner	Party
Madras State
1952	A. M. Sambandam	Indian National Congress
1957	K. S. G. Haja Shareef	Indian National Congress
1962	V. R. Nedunchezhiyan	Dravida Munnetra Kazhagam
1967	V. R. Nedunchezhiyan	Dravida Munnetra Kazhagam
Tamil Nadu
Fifth	V. R. Nedunchezhiyan	Dravida Munnetra Kazhagam
Sixth	M. Aranganathan	Dravida Munnetra Kazhagam
Seventh	K. S. G. Haja Shareef	Indian National Congress
Eighth	Abdul Samad	Dravida Munnetra Kazhagam
Ninth	K. Nanjil Manoharan	Dravida Munnetra Kazhagam
Tenth	Mohammad Asif	All India Anna Dravida Munnetra Kazhagam
Eleventh	K. Nanjil Manoharan	Dravida Munnetra Kazhagam
Twelfth	S. A. M. Hussain	Dravida Munnetra Kazhagam
Thirteenth	Bader Sayeed	All India Anna Dravida Munnetra Kazhagam

== Election results ==
=== 2006 ===
2006 Tamil Nadu Legislative Assembly election: Triplicane
Party	Candidate	Votes	%	±%
AIADMK	Bader Sayeed	40,404	47.25	
DMK	M. Naganathan	37,628	44.01	−5.78
DMDK	K. Shivakumar	4,834	5.65	
BJP	S. Sathish Kumar	1,631	1.91	
Independent	R. Vivekanandan	319	0.37	
BSP	K. Saravanan	181	0.21	
Independent	R. Srinivasan	144	0.17	
Independent	S. Sasikumar	134	0.16	
Independent	M. Santhanam	123	0.14	
Independent	P. Shanmugam	106	0.12	
Margin of victory		2,776	3.25	−1.99
Turnout		85,504	64.52	21.42
Registered electors		132,523		
AIADMK gain from DMK		Swing	-2.54	

=== 2001 ===
2001 Tamil Nadu Legislative Assembly election: Triplicane
Party	Candidate	Votes	%	±%
DMK	S. A. M. Hussain	34,943	49.79	−20.31
INC	S. Rajakumar	31,267	44.55	
MDMK	Vijaya Dhayanban	2,034	2.90	0.14
Independent	Mu. Krishnaparayanar	405	0.58	
Independent	G. Sreeram	356	0.51	
Independent	V. Ranganathan	211	0.30	
Independent	G. R. Venkatesh	185	0.26	
SP	A. Noor Mohamed	156	0.22	
Thaayaga Makkal Katchi	N. M. Dharmalingam	141	0.20	
Independent	G. Maragatha Valli	131	0.19	
RJD	T. Sivagnanasambandan	96	0.14	
Margin of victory		3,676	5.24	−43.46
Turnout		70,179	43.10	−17.31
Registered electors		162,839		
DMK hold		Swing	-20.31	

=== 1996 ===
1996 Tamil Nadu Legislative Assembly election: Triplicane
Party	Candidate	Votes	%	±%
DMK	Nanjil K. Manoharan	50,401	70.10	32.60
AIADMK	A. Wahab	15,390	21.41	−33.66
BJP	L. E. Balraj	2,597	3.61	−0.40
MDMK	O. Sundaram	1,986	2.76	
PMK	K. Karunamurthy	915	1.27	
Independent	S. Venugopal	88	0.12	
Independent	G. Maragathavalli	61	0.08	
Independent	Saravanan	60	0.08	
Independent	B. Selvam	58	0.08	
Independent	M. Dhanapal	58	0.08	
Independent	S. S. Marisamy Kurumans	56	0.08	
Margin of victory		35,011	48.70	31.13
Turnout		71,898	60.41	4.83
Registered electors		121,322		
DMK gain from AIADMK		Swing	15.03	

=== 1991 ===
1991 Tamil Nadu Legislative Assembly election: Triplicane
Party	Candidate	Votes	%	±%
AIADMK	Mohammad Asif	39,028	55.07	21.77
DMK	Nanjil K. Manoharan	26,576	37.50	−8.36
BJP	Azhagumani	2,841	4.01	
PMK	Parthasarathi	1,481	2.09	
JP	Murugesan	478	0.67	
Independent	Vijayalakshmi	109	0.15	
Independent	Selvam	84	0.12	
Independent	Sathiavathi Gnanadas	72	0.10	
THMM	Ragavendra Rao	72	0.10	
Independent	Vaithinathan	55	0.08	
Independent	Deenan	32	0.05	
Margin of victory		12,452	17.57	5.01
Turnout		70,872	55.58	−14.34
Registered electors		129,453		
AIADMK gain from DMK		Swing	9.21	

=== 1989 ===
1989 Tamil Nadu Legislative Assembly election: Triplicane
Party	Candidate	Votes	%	±%
DMK	Nanjil K. Manoharan	36,414	45.86	−4.66
AIADMK	H. V. Hande	26,442	33.30	
INC	B. Rama Devi	12,531	15.78	−26.27
Independent	M. Gajanathan	2,878	3.62	
Independent	Mohamad Ali Hussain	220	0.28	
Independent	M. A. Mohideen	152	0.19	
INC(J)	Jainuddin	142	0.18	
Independent	Mohamed Yousup	83	0.10	
Independent	B. Ramakrishnan	83	0.10	
Independent	S. D. Panneenselvam	81	0.10	
Independent	G. Maragathavalli	76	0.10	
Margin of victory		9,972	12.56	4.08
Turnout		79,401	69.92	7.39
Registered electors		115,258		
DMK hold		Swing	-4.66	

=== 1984 ===
1984 Tamil Nadu Legislative Assembly election: Triplicane
Party	Candidate	Votes	%	±%
DMK	A. K. A. Abdul Samad	36,410	50.52	
INC	K. S. G. Haja Shareef	30,302	42.05	−10.72
Independent	Kumarasamy Alias Kailal Mannan	1,871	2.60	
Independent	P. T. Srinivasan	1,298	1.80	
Independent	B. Selvamani	814	1.13	
Independent	M. C. Kannappan	242	0.34	
Independent	P. Ramakrishnan Sathyalaya	195	0.27	
Independent	P. Jagannathan	180	0.25	
Independent	V. Jayalakshmi	175	0.24	
Independent	T. Kalingamurthy	143	0.20	
Independent	K. N. Natarajan	136	0.19	
Margin of victory		6,108	8.48	−2.31
Turnout		72,065	62.54	5.73
Registered electors		119,445		
DMK gain from INC		Swing	-2.24	

=== 1980 ===
1980 Tamil Nadu Legislative Assembly election: Triplicane
Party	Candidate	Votes	%	±%
INC	K. S. G. Haja Shareef	33,664	52.77	39.06
INC(U)	V. K. Sridharan	26,786	41.99	
JP	G. Ramaswamy	1,811	2.84	
ABJS	N. Gopalakrishnan	567	0.89	
Independent	C. Lakshmaiah	485	0.76	
Independent	V. Jayalakshmi	377	0.59	
Independent	Era. Chandramohan	108	0.17	
Margin of victory		6,878	10.78	7.55
Turnout		63,798	56.81	6.75
Registered electors		113,394		
INC gain from DMK		Swing	17.61	

=== 1977 ===
1977 Tamil Nadu Legislative Assembly election: Triplicane
Party	Candidate	Votes	%	±%
DMK	M. Aranganathan	23,154	35.16	−15.24
AIADMK	Noorjahan Razack	21,027	31.93	
JP	K. S. Narayanan	12,401	18.83	
INC	S. Veeraragaghavan	9,027	13.71	−35.25
Independent	D. Raghavan	247	0.38	
Margin of victory		2,127	3.23	1.78
Turnout		65,856	50.05	−20.61
Registered electors		132,743		
DMK hold		Swing	-15.24	

=== 1971 ===
1971 Tamil Nadu Legislative Assembly election: Triplicane
Party	Candidate	Votes	%	±%
DMK	V. R. Nedunchezhiyan	36,237	50.40	−9.01
INC	K. Vinayakam	35,198	48.95	9.02
Independent	Noorg Ehan Mamadi	340	0.47	
Independent	S. A. Zaman	127	0.18	
Margin of victory		1,039	1.45	−18.03
Turnout		71,902	70.66	−4.95
Registered electors		104,278		
DMK hold		Swing	-9.01	

=== 1967 ===
1967 Madras Legislative Assembly election: Triplicane
Party	Candidate	Votes	%	±%
DMK	V. R. Nedunchezhiyan	38,721	59.41	8.12
INC	M. S. Sammandappa	26,027	39.93	4.63
ABJS	N. V. Rao	431	0.66	
Margin of victory		12,694	19.48	3.49
Turnout		65,179	75.61	3.11
Registered electors		87,580		
DMK hold		Swing	8.12	

=== 1962 ===
1962 Madras Legislative Assembly election: Triplicane
Party	Candidate	Votes	%	±%
DMK	V. R. Nedunchezhiyan	33,273	51.29	
INC	Sivanesan	22,903	35.31	−0.60
SWA	N. S. Varadachary	7,418	11.44	
Independent	K. N. Natrajan	1,276	1.97	
Margin of victory		10,370	15.99	13.18
Turnout		64,870	72.50	32.49
Registered electors		92,042		
DMK gain from INC		Swing	15.38	

=== 1957 ===
1957 Madras Legislative Assembly election: Triplicane
Party	Candidate	Votes	%	±%
INC	K. S. G. Haja Shareef	12,990	35.91	0.23
Independent	Appadurai	11,975	33.10	
Independent	Chinna Annamalai	10,278	28.41	
Independent	Kuppuswami	446	1.23	
Independent	Moova Rammia Naidu	265	0.73	
Independent	P. R. Chengalvaroya Chettiar	221	0.61	
Margin of victory		1,015	2.81	−4.44
Turnout		36,175	40.01	−15.46
Registered electors		90,420		
INC hold		Swing	0.23	

=== 1952 ===
1952 Madras Legislative Assembly election: Triplicane
Party	Candidate	Votes	%	±%
INC	A. M. Sambandam	14,168	35.68	35.68
Independent	M. S. Abdul Majeed	11,290	28.43	
Socialist Party (India)	K. Jagadisa Ayyar	3,850	9.70	
CPI	K. M. Doraikannu	3,714	9.35	
Independent	K. S. Ekambaram	2,954	7.44	
Independent	R. P. Nagarajan	1,764	4.44	
Independent	Nadamurthi Narasimhan	536	1.35	
Independent	Parthasarathy Naicker	348	0.88	
KMPP	V. Jagalakshmi	330	0.83	
Independent	R. R. Dalavai	275	0.69	
Independent	Thirupurasundari Ammal	202	0.51	
Margin of victory		2,878	7.25	
Turnout		39,709	55.46	
Registered electors		71,594		
INC win (new seat)				
