= Dha. Velu =

Indian politician

Member of the Tamil Nadu Legislative Assembly
- In office 12 May 2021 – 5 May 2026
- Preceded by: R. Nataraj
- Succeeded by: P. Venkataramanan
- Constituency: Mylapore

Personal details
- Party: Dravida Munnetra Kazhagam
- Spouse: Susila
- Education: Sri Venkateswara University

Dha. Velu is an Indian politician who was a Member of the Legislative Assembly of Tamil Nadu. He was elected from Mylapore as a Dravida Munnetra Kazhagam candidate in 2021. He lost in 2026 Tamil Nadu Legislative Assembly election to P. Venkataramanan of Tamilaga Vettri Kazhagam.

== Elections contested ==
Election	Constituency	Party	Result	Vote %	Opposition	Opposition Party	Opposition vote %
2026 Tamil Nadu Legislative Assembly election	Mylapore	DMK	Lost	27.29%	P. Venkataramanan	TVK	46.53%
2021 Tamil Nadu Legislative Assembly election	Mylapore	DMK	Won	45.51%	R. Nataraj	ADMK	39.12%
