= R. Nataraj =

Indian politician

Ramachandran Nataraj

Member of the Tamil Nadu Legislative Assembly
- In office 2016 - 2021
- Preceded by: R. Rajalakshmi
- Succeeded by: Dha. Velu
- Constituency: Mylapore

Personal details
- Born: 31 March 1951 (age 75) Chennai, Tamil Nadu, India
- Education: Presidency College, Madras University
- Occupation: Director General of Police, Lawyer, PhD, Ex-MLA of Mylapore
- Profession: Bureaucrat/ Politician
- Known for: Prisoner rehabilitation, Education, health, Anti-Corruption, Environmental protection

Ramachandran Nataraj, I.P.S. (born 31 March 1951) is a retired Indian Police Service officer, who also served as the former chairman of the Tamil Nadu Public Service Commission (19 January 2012 – 12 January 2013). He is known for his public service career that spans over four decades, that further continued after his retirement as Director General of Police in 2011. He belongs to the 1975 officer's batch and has served in various state and central government capacities. Furthermore, he has been a part of the Central Reserve Police Force and has served in the difficult areas of North-East and Jammu and Kashmir. He was the first secretary of the Indian High Commission in Kathmandu from 1986 to 1990.

== Early life and education ==
Nataraj was born in Chennai in 1951 to Poornam Ramachandran (better known as the author Umachandran) and Kamala Ramachandran. He completed his schooling at Hindu High School, Triplicane. During his school days, he joined the Auxiliary Cadet Code. Post school, he joined Vivekananda College to pursue his undergraduate degree in physics. During college days, he was an active member of the NCC. He went on to pursue a master's degree in physics from Presidency College, and a master's degree in Public Administration, a degree in law and later his PhD from Madras University. After graduation, he appeared for the civil services examinations and joined the 1975 batch. He is married to Nirmala Nataraj and has two children, Nikhilesh (a scientist) and Nithyaesh (a lawyer, with high profile clients like actress Trisha).

== Public service ==
Nataraj joined the Indian Police Services in 1975. During his career, he has been part of various sensitive state level operations and played a role in changing long-standing government talent systems and processes. In 1986, he went on to serve as the First Secretary at the Indian Embassy in Kathmandu. Later, he was appointed as the Deputy General of Police of the Central Reserve Police Force (C.R.P.F.) in 1994, wherein he supervised the operation of CRPF troops for their mission in the terrorism-affected areas of Jammu and Kashmir and North-East India. From November 2003 to April 2006, Nataraj served as the Commissioner of Police in Chennai city. Furthermore, he functioned as the Additional General of Police in the State Human Rights Commission and the Economic Offences wing. Later, he served as the Additional Director General of Police - Prisons department. This was succeeded by a promotion to the Director General of Prisons. On 12 June 2009, he was appointed as the head of the Fire and Rescue services department and went on to serve this office till he retired on 31 March 2011. In 2012, Nataraj was appointed as the Chairman of the Tamil Nadu Public Services Commission.

Nataraj is known for his innovative schemes in correctional administration and involvement in causes such as prisoner rehabilitation, education, health, anti-corruption and environmental protection.

== Key achievements ==
Nataraj is known for his reforms to bring transparency to the examination process. He is credited with the introduction of camera monitored examination centres, online registration process for exams, and online mark sheets. Additionally, he introduced permanent registration based numbers to the applicants and deputation of resources to their preferred geographies through a counselling process. His regime with the CRPF troops saw him supervise the tough militant-feared areas in North India.

== Awards and recognition ==
Nataraj has won the following awards during his career.

Year	Award Title
2004	Special Task Force Gallantry Medal
1999	President's Police Medal
1993	President's Police Medal for Meritorious Service

== Political career ==
Nataraj joined the All India Anna Dravida Munnetra Kazhagam (AIADMK) in 2014, in the presence of Chief Minister Jayalalithaa at her Poes Garden Residence. He was elected to the 15th Tamil Nadu Legislative Assembly by the Mylapore constituency in the elections of 2016.
