= T. K. Kapali =

Indian politician

T. K. Kapali was an Indian politician and former Member of the Legislative Assembly of Tamil Nadu.

== Political career ==
He was elected to the Tamil Nadu legislative assembly from Mylapore constituency as a Dravida Munnetra Kazhagam candidate in 1977 election, and as an Anna Dravida Munnetra Kazhagam candidate in 1980 election. He defeated Nanjil K. Manoharan in 1980 election.

== Death ==
He died on 18 December 2007 when he was 78. He has six sons and two daughters.
