= N. P. Ramajayam =

Indian politician

N. P. Ramajayam was elected to the Tamil Nadu Legislative Assembly from the Mylapore constituency in the 1996 elections. He was a candidate of the Dravida Munnetra Kazhagam (DMK) party.
