= R. Rajalakshmi (politician) =

Indian politician

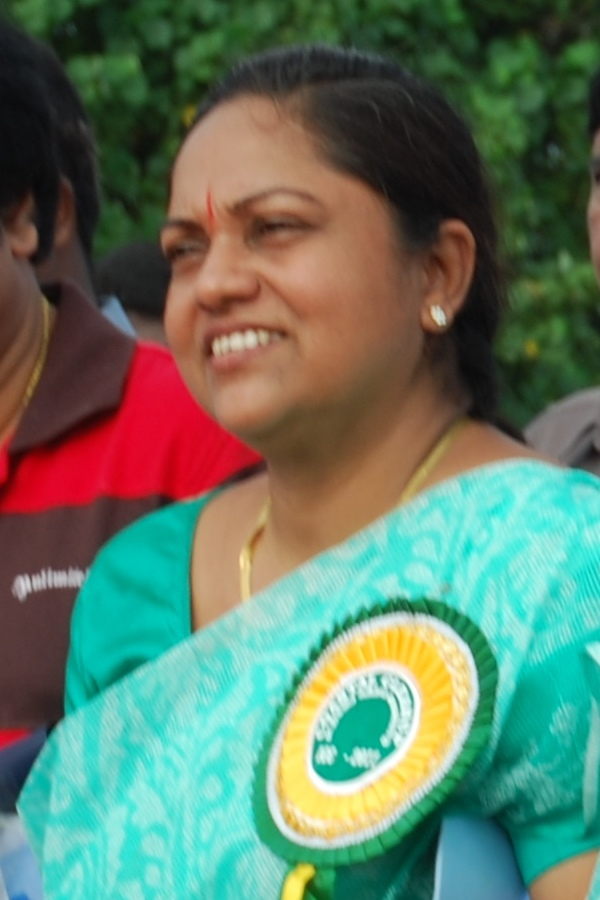
- R. Rajalakshmi in 2011

Member of the Tamil Nadu Legislative Assembly
- In office 23 May 2011 – 21 May 2016
- Preceded by: S. Ve. Shekher
- Succeeded by: R. Nataraj
- Constituency: Mylapore

Personal details
- Party: Tamilaga Vettri Kazhagam
- Other political affiliations: Bharatiya Janata Party (2024–2025); All India Anna Dravida Munnetra Kazhagam (2000–2024)
- Occupation: Advocate

R. Rajalakshmi is an Indian politician and was a member of the 14th Tamil Nadu Legislative Assembly from the Mylapore constituency in Chennai District. She represented the All India Anna Dravida Munnetra Kazhagam party.

The elections of 2016 resulted in her constituency being won by R. Nataraj. Rajalakshmi was one of thirteen AIADMK MLAs in the Greater Chennai area who were deselected by the party, apparently in an attempt to thwart a potential anti-incumbency backlash from the electorate following the recent flooding. It was felt that fresh faces would put some distance between the past and the present. She joined BJP on 11 March 2024. She quit BJP and joined TVK in the presence of its leader Vijay on 9 June 2025.
