= T. K. Radhakrishnan =

Carnatic classical flautist from Madras, India (1919–2003)

T K Radhakrishnan (1919–2003) was a Carnatic classical flautist from Madras, India.
