= 1962 Indian general election in Madras State =

Indian general election in Madras, 1962
- February 1962

41 (of 494) seats in the Lok Sabha
- Registered: 18675436
- Turnout: 12843914 (68.77%) ▲21.02%
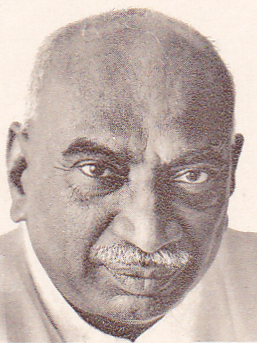

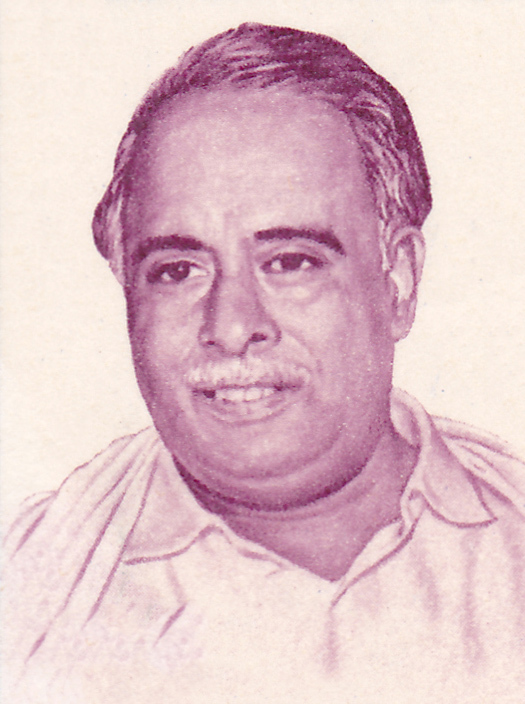
	First party	Second party
Leader	K. Kamaraj	C.N. Annadurai
Party	INC	DMK
Leader's seat	Did not contest	Rajya Sabha
Seats won	31	7
Seat change	Steady	▲5
Popular vote	5,623,013	2,315,610
Percentage	45.26%	18.64%
Swing	▼1.26%	Contested as independents
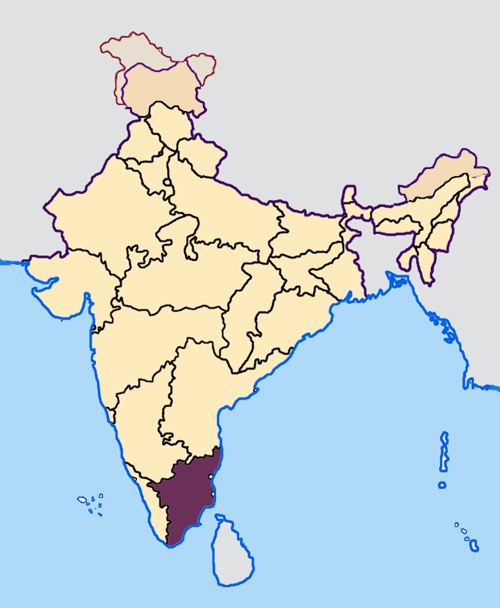
- Tamil Nadu
Prime Minister before election
Jawaharlal Nehru
INC
Prime Minister after election
Jawaharlal Nehru
INC

The 1962 Indian general election polls in Tamil Nadu were held for 41 seats in the state. The result was a victory for Indian National Congress winning 31 out of 41 seats. This would mark the last time, that Congress has won more than 30 seats in this state, without the help of allies. After the defeat of Congress, in Madras, in 1967, Congress sought help and allied with local parties, to get seats in Madras/Tamil Nadu.

== Voting and results ==
Party	Seats			Popular vote		
Party	Contested	Won	+/−	Votes	%	±pp
Indian National Congress	41	31	Steady	56,23,013	45.26	▼1.26%
Dravida Munnetra Kazhagam	18	7	▲7	23,15,610	18.64	New
Communist Party of India	14	2	Steady	12,72,313	10.24	▲0.18%
Swatantra Party	16	0	New	13,00,526	10.47	New
Independents	46	0	▼8	9,33,150	7.51	▼32.26%
Total	41			1,24,24,036		
Invalid votes	4,19,878	3.26				
Votes cast / turnout	1,28,43,984	68.77				
Registered voters	1,86,75,436	100.00				

== List of Elected MPs ==
Constituency		Winner				Runner Up				Margin	%
#	Name	Candidate	Party	Votes	%	Candidate	Party	Votes	%	Margin	%
1	Madras North	P. Srinivasan	INC	122,160	37.67	Abdus Samad	IUML	113,311	34.94	8,849	2.73
2	Madras South	K. Manoharan	DMK	151,917	44.73	C. R. Ramaswamy	INC	89,771	26.43	62,146	18.30
3	Sriperumbudur (SC)	P. Sivasankaran	DMK	157,733	52.56	K. Munuswamy	INC	142,361	47.44	15,372	5.12
4	Chingleput	O. V. Alagesan	INC	169,988	53.10	S. Krishnaswamy	IND	150,110	46.90	19,878	6.20
5	Tiruvallur	V. Govindaswamy Naidu	INC	157,343	47.92	M. Gopal	DMK	143,908	43.83	13,435	4.09
6	Vellore	Abdull Wahid	INC	114,872	41.03	N. Sivaraj	RPI	90,906	32.47	23,966	8.56
7	Wandiwash (SC)	Jayaraman	INC	111,053	39.39	M. Krishnasami	RPI	100,256	35.56	10,797	3.83
8	Tiruvannamalai	Dharmalingam	DMK	141,254	48.99	G. Neelakantan	INC	137,528	47.69	3,726	1.30
9	Tindivanam	R. Venkatasubba Reddiar	INC	132,330	48.35	K. Ramamoorthi Goundar	SWA	118,033	43.12	14,297	5.23
10	Cuddalore	T. Ramabadra Naidu	DMK	160,811	51.38	T. D. Muthukumaraswami Naidu	INC	125,424	40.08	35,387	11.30
11	Chidambaram	R. Kangagosabai	INC	140,731	44.63	R. Thillaivaillalan	DMK	136,671	43.34	4,060	1.29
12	Tirukoilur (SC)	L. Elaya Perumal	INC	134,815	53.51	C. Govindaraju	DMK	117,115	46.49	17,700	7.02
13	Tiruppattur	R. Muthu Gounder	DMK	151,938	51.59	Duraiswami Goundan	INC	118,303	40.17	33,635	11.42
14	Krishnagiri	K. Rajaram	DMK	127,508	48.78	C. R. Narasimhan	INC	118,907	45.49	8,601	3.29
15	Salem	S. V. Ramaswamy	INC	147,525	49.34	K. Rajagopal	DMK	135,787	45.42	11,738	3.92
16	Tiruchengode	P. Subbarayan	INC	109,799	43.74	S. Kandappan	DMK	97,635	38.90	12,164	4.84
17	Namakkal (SC)	V. K. Ramaswamy	INC	118,603	43.83	M. P. Vadivelu	DMK	109,652	40.52	8,951	3.31
18	Erode	Paramasiva Gounder	INC	156,739	45.75	Narayanan	DMK	117,561	34.32	39,178	11.43
19	Gobichettipalayam	P. G. Karuthiruman	INC	142,993	49.77	K. M. Ramasami Gounder	IND	71,558	24.91	71,435	24.86
20	Nilgiris	Akkamma Devi	INC	163,420	52.54	M. E. Madhanan	CPI	75,299	24.21	88,121	28.33
21	Coimbatore	P. R. Ramakrishnan	INC	151,019	39.06	Parvathi Krishnan	CPI	108,458	28.05	42,561	11.01
22	Pollachi	C. Subramaniam	INC	176,512	56.40	R. M. Ramasami	SWA	76,415	24.41	100,097	31.99
23	Periyakulam	Malaichamy Thevar	INC	146,829	48.44	Muthaih	IND	143,930	47.48	2,899	0.96
24	Madurai	N. M. R. Subbaraman	INC	140,574	39.55	K. T. K. Tangamani	CPI	123,386	34.72	17,188	4.83
25	Melur (SC)	P. Maruthaiah	INC	155,629	52.17	V. S. Sivaprakasam	SWA	142,710	47.83	12,919	4.34
26	Dindigul	T. S. Soundaram	INC	138,574	43.23	M. S. Abdul Khader	DMK	84,921	26.49	53,653	16.74
27	Karur	R. Ramanathan Chettiar	INC	139,385	48.59	P. Ponnambala Gounder	SWA	100,229	34.94	39,156	13.65
28	Tiruchirapalli	K. Anada Nambiar	CPI	156,706	47.80	M. K. M. Abdul Salam	INC	147,332	44.94	9,374	2.86
29	Perambalur	Era Sezhiyan	DMK	188,926	55.90	M. Palaniyandi	INC	133,536	39.51	55,390	16.39
30	Pudukkottai	R. Umanath	CPI	134,162	44.99	L. Alagusundaram Chettiar	INC	103,944	34.86	30,218	10.13
31	Kumbakonam	C. R. Pattabiraman	INC	155,389	47.21	T. K. Srinivasan	DMK	144,490	43.90	10,899	3.31
32	Mayuram (SC)	Maragatham	INC	149,330	45.74	Subirravelu	DMK	106,059	32.48	43,271	13.26
33	Nagapattinam	Gopalsamy Thenkondar	INC	161,421	45.98	C. Kandasamy Thevar	CPI	129,004	36.74	32,417	9.24
34	Thanjavur	Vairava Thevar	INC	143,185	43.58	Vallatharasu	PSP	115,112	35.04	28,073	8.54
35	Ramanathapuram	N. Arunachalam	INC	145,396	41.14	Salivateeswaran	SWA	114,513	32.40	30,883	8.74
36	Aruppukkottai	U. Muthuramalinga Thevar	AIFB	175,772	51.72	Arumugasami	INC	155,919	45.88	19,853	5.84
37	Koilpatti (SC)	S. C. Balakrishnan	INC	150,175	47.94	Velu Kudumban	SWA	93,843	29.96	56,332	17.98
38	Tirunelveli	Muthiah	INC	151,822	47.69	Mariadas Ruthnasamy	SWA	129,803	40.77	22,019	6.92
39	Tenkasai	M. P. Swamy	INC	165,169	51.15	S. A. Muruganandam	CPI	93,729	29.02	71,440	22.13
40	Tiruchendur	T. T. Krishnamachari	INC	Won Uncontested							
41	Nagercoil	A. Nesamony	INC	157,208	56.37	P. Vivekananda	IND	81,587	29.25	75,621	27.12

== See also ==
- Elections in Tamil Nadu

== Bibliography ==
- Volume I, 1962 Indian general election, 3rd Lok Sabha
