= List of constituencies of the Tamil Nadu Legislative Council =

The Tamil Nadu Legislative Council was the upper house of the legislature of the Indian state of Tamil Nadu. It was a Vidhan Parishad and its members were chosen by a mixture of direct and indirect elections and nominations by the Governor of Tamil Nadu. The council was abolished in 1986 and was revived in 2010 by an act of parliament. The legislative council is a permanent body and is not subject to dissolution. The length of a member's term is six years and one third of the members retired every two years. The strength of the council was between 40 and 78 (one third of the strength of the assembly).

== Methods of member selection ==
The following table illustrates how the members of Council were selected:

Proportion	Method of Selection
12 (1/6)	Nominated by the Governor on the advice of the cabinet. They were supposed to have excelled in fields like arts, science, literature, cooperative movement or social service
26(1/3)	Elected by the members of the Legislative Assembly by proportional representation using the Single Transferable Vote System
26 (1/3)	Elected by the members of local self governmental bodies like corporations, municipalities and district boards.
7 (1/12)	Elected by an electorate consisting of electors who have held Graduate degrees for a minimum of three years
7 (1/12)	Elected by an electorate consisting of teachers of secondary schools, colleges and universities with a minimum experience of three years

== List of constituencies ==
Constituencies for the new council were identified in September 2010:

=== Local body constituencies ===
S. No	Constituency	Geographical Area Covered	No of Members
1	Chennai Local Authorities	Chennai District	2
2	Tiruvallur Local Authorities .	Tiruvallur District	1
3	Kanchipuram Local Authorities	Kanchipuram District	1
4	Vellore Local Authorities	Vellore District	1
5	Tiruvannamalai Local Authorities	Tiruvannamalai district	1
6	Villupuram Local Authorities	Villupuram District	1
7	Cuddalore-Ariyalur Local authorities	Cuddalore and Ariyalur districts	1
8	Dharmapuri Local Authorities	Dharmapuri District	1
9	Krishnagiri Local Authorities	Krishnagiri District	1
10	Salem Local Authorities	Salem District	1
11	Namakkal-Karur Local Authorities	Namakkal and Karur districts	1
12	Coimbatore-Nilgiris Local Authorities	Coimbatore and Nilgiris districts	1
13	Erode Local Authorities	Erode District	1
14	Tirupur Local Authorities	Tirupur District	1
15	Dindigul-Theni Local Authorities	Dindigul and Theni districts	1
16	Madurai Local Authorities	Madurai District	1
17	Tiruchirappalli–Perambalur Local Authorities	Trichy and Perambalur districts	1
18	Nagapattinam- Tiruvarur Local Authorities	Nagapattinam and Thiruvarur districts	1
19	Thanjavur Local Authorities	Thanjavur District	1
20	Pudhukkottai Local Authorities	Pudhukkottai District	1
21	Sivaganga-Ramanathapuram Local Authorities	Sivagangai and Ramanathapuram districts	1
22	Virudhunagar Local Authorities	Virudhunagar District	1
23	Thoothukudi Local Authorities	Thoothukudi District	1
24	Tirunelveli Local Authorities	Tirunelveli District	1
25	Kanyakumari Local Authorities	Kanyakumari District	1

=== Graduates' constituencies ===
S. No	Constituency	Geographical Area Covered	No of Members
1	Chennai Graduates	Chennai, Thiruvallur and Kanchipuram districts	1
2	Tamil Nadu North Graduates	Vellore, Krishnagiri, Dharmapuri and Thiruvannamalai districts	1
3	Tamil Nadu North Central Graduates	Villupram, Salem, Namakkal and Cuddalore districts	1
4	Tamil Nadu West Graduates	Erode, Nilgiris, Coimbatore, Karur and Tiruppur districts	1
5	Tamil Nadu East Central Graduates	Trichy, Perambalur, Ariyalur, Nagapattinam, Thiruvarur and Tanjavur districts	1
6	Tamil Nadu South Central Graduates	Dindigal, Pudhukottai, Sivagangai, Madurai and Ramanathapuram districts	1
7	Tamil Nadu South Graduates	Theni, Virudhunagar, Thoothukudi, Tirunelveli and Kanyakumari districts	1

=== Teachers' constituencies ===
S. No	Constituency	Geographical Area Covered	No of Members
1	Chennai Teachers	Chennai, Thiruvallur and Kanchipuram districts	1
2	Tamil Nadu North Teachers	Vellore, Krishnagiri, Dharmapuri and Thiruvannamalai districts	1
3	Tamil Nadu North Central Teachers	Villupram, Salem, Namakkal and Cuddalore districts	1
4	Tamil Nadu West Teachers	Erode, Nilgiris, Coimbatore, Karur and Tiruppur districts	1
5	Tamil Nadu East Central Teachers	Trichy, Perambalur, Ariyalur, Nagapattinam, Thiruvarur and Tanjavur districts	1
6	Tamil Nadu South Central Teachers	Dindigal, Pudhukottai, Sivagangai, Madurai and Ramanathapuram districts	1
7	Tamil Nadu South Teachers	Theni, Virudhunagar, Thoothukudi, Tirunelveli and Kanyakumari districts	1
