= C. R. Ramaswamy =

Indian politician

Member of Tamil Nadu Legislative Assembly
- In office 1952–1957
- Constituency: Mylapore

Member of Tamil Nadu Legislative Assembly
- In office 1957–1962
- Constituency: Mylapore

Personal details
- Party: Indian National Congress

C. R. Ramaswamy was an Indian politician and former Member of the Legislative Assembly of Tamil Nadu. He was elected to the Tamil Nadu legislative assembly from Mylapore constituency as an Indian National Congress candidate in 1952, and 1957 elections.
