= N. Ganapathy (Thanjavur) =

Indian politician

N. Ganapathy was an Indian politician of the Dravida Munnetra Kazhagam and Member of the Legislative Assembly of Tamil Nadu from Papanasam Thanjavur District. He served as the Deputy Speaker of the Tamil Nadu Legislative Assembly from 1973 to 1977. He was again a Member of the Legislative Assembly in 1989-1991 from Mylapore Constituency in Chennai City. Mr. Ganapathy was also a brilliant lawyer headed the law firm Pathy & Sundaram practising in the Madras High Court. Mr. Ganapathy worked with Mr. G. Ramaswamy, former Attorney General of India.
