= Sattur Ramachandran =

Indian politician

K. K. S. S. R. Ramachandran
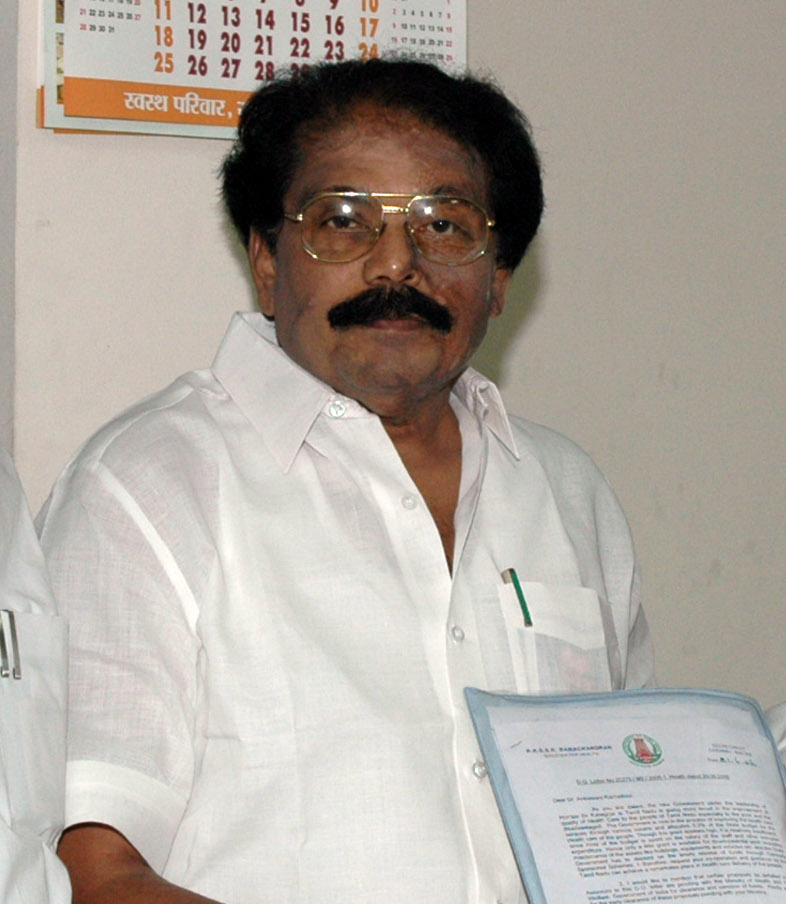
- K. K. S. S. R in 2006

Cabinet Minister Government of Tamil Nadu
- In office 7 May 2021 – 5 May 2026
- Minister: Revenue; District Revenue Establishment; Deputy Collectors; Disaster Management
- Governor: Banwarilal Purohit; R. N. Ravi
- Chief Minister: M. K. Stalin

Cabinet Minister Government of Tamil Nadu
- In office 13 May 2006 – 15 May 2011
- Minister: Backward Classes; Most Backward Classes and De-notified Communities; Overseas Indians; Refugees and Evacuees; Handlooms and Textiles
- Governor: Surjit Singh Barnala
- Chief Minister: M. Karunanidhi

Cabinet Minister Government of Tamil Nadu
- In office 14 February 1985 – 7 January 1988
- Minister: Public Works
- Chief Minister: M. G. Ramachandran

Cabinet Minister Government of Tamil Nadu
- In office 9 June 1980 – 14 February 1985
- Minister: Cooperatives
- Chief Minister: M. G. Ramachandran

Member of the Tamil Nadu Legislative Assembly
- Incumbent
- Assumed office 19 May 2016
- Preceded by: Vaigaichelvan
- Constituency: Aruppukottai
- In office 19 June 1991 – 13 May 2011
- Preceded by: S. S. Karuppasamy
- Succeeded by: R. B. Udhaya Kumar
- Constituency: Sattur
- In office 25 January 1989 – 30 January 1991
- Preceded by: S. Kumara Kurubara Ramanathan
- Succeeded by: N. C. Kanagavalli
- Constituency: Vilathikulam
- In office 25 June 1977 – 30 January 1988
- Preceded by: S. Alagu Thevar
- Succeeded by: S. S. Karuppasamy
- Constituency: Sattur

Personal details
- Born: Kopalapuram Kanthasamy Subbu Reddiar Subbu Reddiar Ranganatha Reddiar Ramachandran; 8 August 1949 (age 77)
- Party: Dravida Munnetra Kazhagam
- Other political affiliations: Thayaga Marumalarchi Kazhagam; All India Anna Dravida Munnetra Kazhagam

K. K. S. S. R. Ramachandran Reddiyar (generally known as Sattur Ramachandran) is an Indian politician served as the Minister for Revenue and Disaster Management of Tamil Nadu He had also been the minister for Backward Classes between 2006 and 2011. He has been elected to the Tamil Tamil Nadu Legislative Assembly 9 times with a political career spanning over 40 years.

== Political career ==
He has been elected to the Tamil Nadu Assembly eight times and won on three consecutive occasions as an All India Anna Dravida Munnetra Kazhagam (AIADMK) candidate from the Sattur constituency. After the death of M. G. Ramachandran, he won the neighbouring Vilathikulam constituency as a candidate for the AIADMK (Jayalalitha faction). He started Anna Puratchi Thalaivar Munnetra Kazhagam with Su. Thirunavukkarasar in 1989. He again won Sattur, as a candidate for the then-new Anna Puratchi Thalaivar Munnetra Kazhagam (but registered as the candidate of Thayaga Marumalarchi Kazhagam) and subsequently suffered his first defeat after re-joining and merged his party with AIADMK in 1996. Switching allegiance once more - this time to the Dravida Munnetra Kazhagam - he won the next two elections, in 2001 and 2006.

He was the Minister for Cooperation and Public Works Department in the M. G. Ramachandran Cabinet between 1984 and 1987. In M. Karunanidhi Cabinet he was appointed the Minister for Health, and later appointed the Minister for Backward class welfare between 2006 and 2011. Currently, he is the Minister for Revenue and Disaster Management.

== Electoral Career ==
Year	Constituency	Party	Votes	%	Opponent	Opponent Party	Opponent Votes	%	Result	Margin	%
1977	Sattur	AIADMK	38,772	43.24	M. Karmegasamy	INC	21,830	24.35	Won	16,942	18.90
1980	Sattur	AIADMK	54,720	69.40	S. Saudi Sundara Barati	DMK	43,795	44.10	Won	10,925	13.86
1984	Sattur	AIADMK	58,745	51.03	S. S. Karuppasamy	DMK	51,338	44.60	Won	7,407	6.43
1989	Vilathikulam	AIADMK(J)	33,951	36.59	S. Kumaragurubara Ramanathan	DMK	25,955	27.97	Won	7,996	8.62
1991	Sattur	TMK	59,942	36.59	Sannasi Karuppasamy	AIADMK	57,703	27.97	Won	2,239	1.28
1996	Sattur	AIADMK	49,608	36.34	S. Vijayakumar	DMK	58,972	43.20	Lost	-9,364	-6.86
2001	Sattur	DMK	57,953	42.91	A. Rajendran	INC	53,538	39.64	Won	4,415	3.27
2006	Sattur	DMK	73,918	49.58	G. Chockeswaran	AIADMK	53,073	35.60	Won	20,845	13.98
2011	Aruppukottai	DMK	65,908	44.05	Vaigaichelvan	AIADMK	76,546	51.15	Lost	-10,638	-7.11
2016	Aruppukottai	DMK	81,485	49.41	Vaigaichelvan	AIADMK	63,431	38.46	Won	18,054	10.95
2021	Aruppukottai	DMK	91,040	53.18	Vaigaichelvan	AIADMK	52,006	30.38	Won	39,034	28.80
2026	Aruppukottai	DMK	65,104	36.49	K. Karthik Kumar	TVK	60,161	33.72	Won	4,943	2.77
