= Thangam Thennarasu =

Indian politician

Thangam Thenarasu
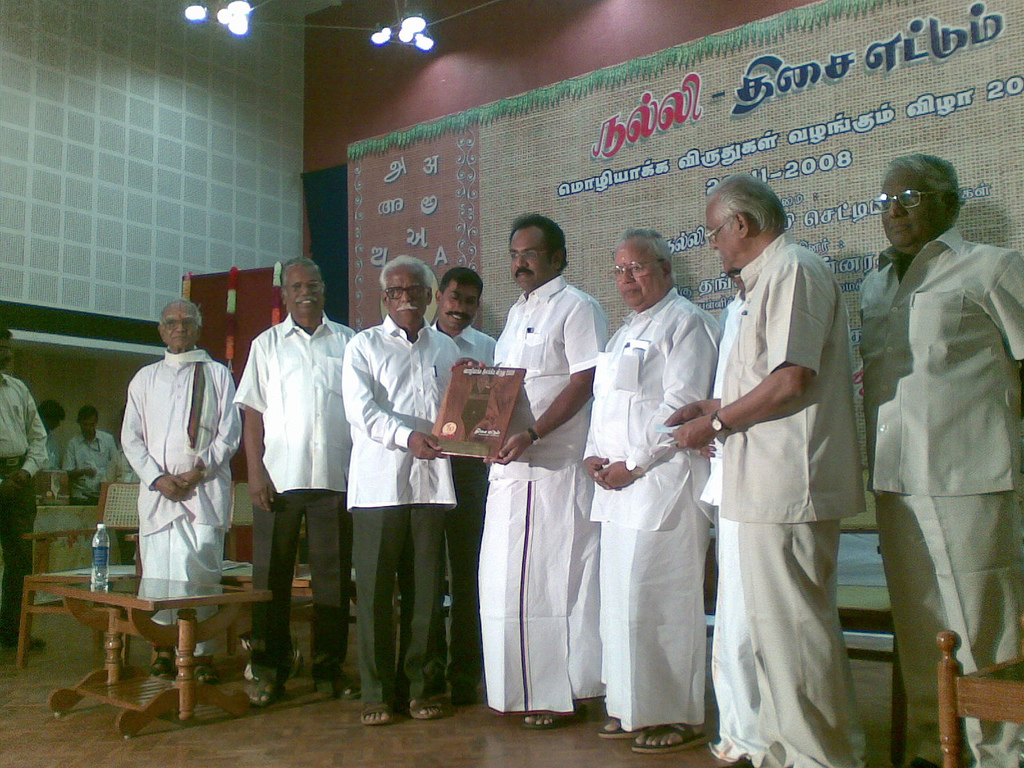
- Thenarasu (centre right) presenting a lifetime achievement award to N. Dharmarajan

Minister for Electricity (Tamil Nadu)
- In office 16 June 2023 – 28 September 2024
- Chief Minister: M. K. Stalin
- Preceded by: V. Senthil Balaji
- Succeeded by: V. Senthil Balaji

Minister for Finance and Human Resources Management (Tamil Nadu)
- In office 11 May 2023 – 5 May 2026
- Chief Minister: M. K. Stalin
- Preceded by: Palanivel Thiagarajan
- Succeeded by: K. A. Sengottaiyan

Minister for Industries (Tamil Nadu)
- In office 7 May 2021 – 10 May 2023
- Chief Minister: M. K. Stalin
- Preceded by: M. C. Sampath
- Succeeded by: T. R. B. Rajaa

Minister for School Education (Tamil Nadu)
- In office 13 May 2006 – 15 May 2011
- Chief Minister: M. Karunanidhi
- Preceded by: C. V. Shanmugam
- Succeeded by: C. V. Shanmugam

Member of the Tamil Nadu Legislative Assembly
- Incumbent
- Assumed office 13 May 2011
- Preceded by: constituency established
- Constituency: Tiruchuli
- In office 11 May 2006 – 13 May 2011
- Preceded by: K. K. Sivasamy
- Succeeded by: Vaigaichelvan
- Constituency: Aruppukottai
- In office 4 March 1998 – 13 May 2001
- Preceded by: V. Thangapandian
- Succeeded by: K. K. Sivasamy
- Constituency: Aruppukottai

Personal details
- Born: 3 June 1966 (age 60) Mallankinaru, composite Ramanathapuram district, Madras State (now Virudhunagar district, Tamil Nadu), India
- Party: Dravida Munnetra Kazhagam
- Relations: V. Thangapandian (Father); Thamizhachi Thangapandian (Sister)
- Occupation: Politician
- Website: THANGAM THENARASU

Thangam Thenarasu (born 3 June 1966) is an Indian politician and former Minister for Finance and Human Resources Management (Tamil Nadu). He is a member of the Dravida Munnetra Kazhagam (DMK).

== Early life and education ==
He was born in Mallankinaru, Tamil Nadu. He has a bachelor's degree in Engineering. He is the son of the former Member of Legislative Assembly and government minister, from Aruppukottai, V. Thangapandian. His older sister, Thamizhachi Thangapandian, is a poet, writer and politician.

== Political career ==
He has served as a Minister for Finance, Planning, Human Resources Management, Pensions and Pensionary benefits, Statistics and Archeology Minister of Tamil nadu. He was allocated the Electricity and Non-Conventional Energy Development portfolios of minister V. Senthil Balaji who was arrested by the Enforcement Directorate in a job racket case on 16 June 2023 by Tamil Nadu Governor R. N. Ravi on the recommendations of Chief Minister M K Stalin.

He served as Minister for School Education in Tamil Nadu between 2006-2011. He has been elected to the Tamil Nadu assembly five times.

He was elected to the Tamil Nadu legislative assembly as a Dravida Munnetra Kazhagam candidate from Aruppukottai constituency in 1997–98 by-election, and 2006 election. Thenarasu became Minister for Schools in the DMK government that gained power at the 2006 state assembly elections. Thenarasu stood as a candidate in the newly created constituency of Tiruchuli for the 2011 elections.

He filed a case in the court against the Tamil Nadu Government's decision to form an inquiry into the alleged irregularities in construction of Tamil Nadu legislative assembly-secretariat complex.

== Elections contested and results ==
Elections	Constituency	Party	Result	Vote percentage
1997–98 Tamil Nadu Legislative Assembly by-election	Aruppukottai	DMK	Won	36.50%
2001 Tamil Nadu state assembly election	Aruppukottai	DMK	Lost	40.32%
2006 Tamil Nadu state assembly election	Aruppukottai	DMK	Won	44.88%
2011 Tamil Nadu state assembly election	Tiruchuli	DMK	Won	54.36%
2016 Tamil Nadu state assembly election	Tiruchuli	DMK	Won	53.61%
2021 Tamil Nadu state assembly election	Tiruchuli	DMK	Won	59.15%
2026 Tamil Nadu Legislative Assembly election	Tiruchuli	DMK	Won	41.43%

== See also ==
- Anna Centenary Library
- Iniyavai Naarppathu Parade
- Abonded assembly complex
