= Thamizhachi Thangapandian =

Indian politician and writer

Sumathy (Thamizhachi Thangapandian)
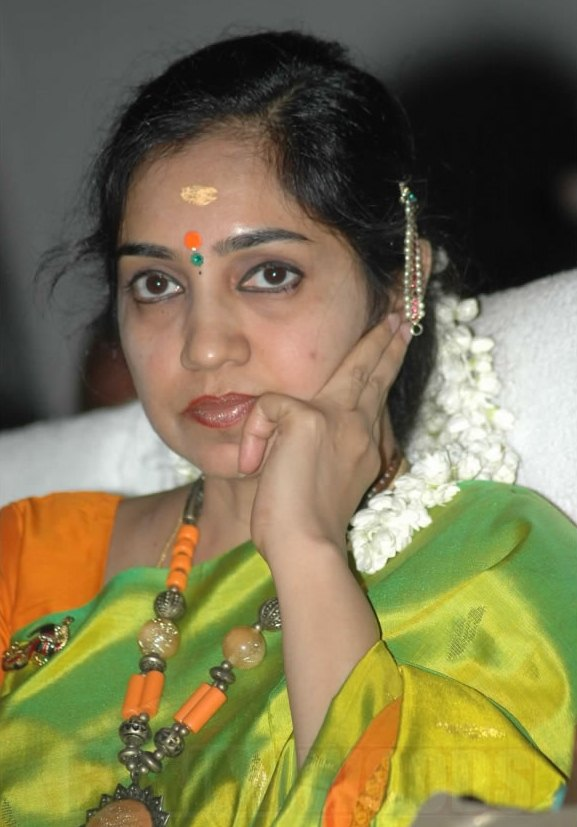

Member of Parliament, Lok Sabha
- Incumbent
- Assumed office 24 May 2019
- Preceded by: J. Jayavardhan
- Constituency: Chennai South

Personal details
- Born: Sumathy; 25 April 1962 (age 64) Mallankinaru, Ramanathapuram District, Madras State (now in Virudhunagar District, Tamil Nadu), India
- Party: Dravida Munnetra Kazhagam
- Spouse: C. Chandrasekar
- Children: 2 daughters
- Parent: V. Thangapandian (Father)
- Relatives: Thangam Thennarasu (Brother)
- Occupation: Lyricist; Writer; Politician
- Awards: Pavendhar Bharathidasan Virudhu – 2009
- Website: ithamizhachi.com

Thamizhachi Thangapandian (born 25 April 1962), also known as Sumathy, is an Indian poet, lyricist, orator, politician and writer. She has been a member of the Lok Sabha, the lower house of the Parliament of India, since the 2019 Indian general election as a member of the Dravida Munnetra Kazhagam (DMK). She worked as a lecturer in English at Queen Mary's College, Chennai before entering politics.

== Early life and education ==
Thamizhachi Thangapandian was born in 1962 to V. Thangapandian and Rajamani Pappathy. Her higher education was completed at Thiagarajar College of Arts & Science, Madurai Kamarajar University and the University of Madras, Chennai. Her PhD was in English Literature. Her younger brother, Thengam Thenarasu, is an active DMK politician.

== Literary work ==
Thangapandian has written in a number of genres. She has published widely in Tamil and English. Her output includes:

=== Tamil ===
- Enjottu Penn, collection of poems published in International Tamil Literary Conference, Chennai (2004, Mithra Publications)
- Uravukal compiled by S. Ravikumar & T. Sumathy (2004, Archuna Publications)
- Vanapechi, collection of poems (2007, Uyirmmai Publications)
- Pecharavam Ketilaiyo, compilation of interviews (2008, Uyirmmai Publications)
- Manjanathi, collection of 70 poems (2009, Uyirmmai Publications)
- Naveenathuvathai Kamban (2010, Annai Muthamizh Publications)
- Katru Konarntha Kadithangal, Kalamum Kavithaiyum, Soll Thodum Thoram, Pampadam (2010, Uyirmmai Publications)
- Aruhan, collection of 39 poems (2011, Uyirmmai Publications)
- Mayileragu Manasu, collection 13 articles (2012, Vikatan Publications; second edition in 2022)
- Manvasam, collection of 30 articles (2013, Vikatan Publications; second edition in 2022)
- Avalukku Veyil Endru Peyar, collection of 32 poems (2015, Uyirmmai Publications)
- Poonaigal Sorgathirku Selvathillai, collection of 56 review articles (2015, Uyirmmai Publications)
- Kallin Kadungobam ("The Rage of a Stone"), translation of Galician poems by Maria Reimondez into Tamil, via English (2017, Uyirmmai Publications)
- Nizhal Veli, translation of Thangapandian's "Island to Island" into Tamil by Sa. Devadoss (2018, Uyirmmai Publications)
- Chottangal, collection of 20 articles (2018, Thamizh Thisai Publications; second edition in 2022)
- Muttu Veedu, collection of five short stories (2019, Uyirmmai Publications)
- Thamizhachi Thangapandiyanin Kavithai Veli, collection of reviews of Thangapandian's works (2020, Uyirmmai Publications)
- Anbin Ulagu Eliyathu, compilation of Thangapandian's interviews in various magazines (2023, Uyirmmai Publications)

=== English ===
- Island to Island: the Voice of Sri Lankan Australian Playwright, Ernest Thalayasingham Macintyre (2013, Emerald Publications)
- Internal Colloquies, translation by C.T. Indra of selected poems from Vanapechi by Thangapandian (2019, Rubric Publishing)
- Birthing Hut and Other Stories, English translation by Dr. V. Bharathi Harishankar from the collection of short stories Muttu Veedu by Thangapandian (2022, Vitasta Publishing Pvt. Ltd)
- The Throb of Silence, English translation by Dr. K. S. Subramanian of selected poems from Thangapandian's published collections (2023, Vitasta Publishing Pvt. Ltd)

=== Other Languages ===
- Internal Colloquies, Hindi translation by Dr. Bina Biswas & Srishti Gupta of selected poems from Vanapechi by Thangapandian (2023, Rubric Publishing)
- Internal Colloquies, Bengali translation by Dr. Bina Biswas of selected poems from Vanapechi by Thangapandian (2023, Rubric Publishing)

== Film career ==
=== As a lyricist ===
Year	Film	Songs	References
2014	Pisaasu	Pogum Paadhai	
2019	Paris Paris	Annachi Kondadu	

=== As a dialogue writer ===
Thangapandian wrote the dialogue for the movie Paris Paris.

== Political career ==
She is one of the prominent woman leaders and orators in the DMK. She stood in the Indian general election, 2019 from Chennai South (Lok Sabha constituency). She was elected again in 2024 and continues to serve as a Member of Parliament, 17th Lok Sabha.

== Elections contested and results ==
Elections	Constituency	Party	Result	Vote percentage	Opposition Candidate	Opposition Party	Opposition vote percentage
Indian general election, 2019	Chennai South	DMK	Won	50.17	J. Jayavardhan	AIADMK	26.88
Indian general election, 2024	Chennai South	DMK	Won	47	Tamilisai Soundararajan	Bharatiya Janata Party	26.44
