= M. D. Ramasami =

Indian politician

Member of the Tamil Nadu Legislative Assembly
- In office 1957–1962
- Preceded by: Jayarama Reddiar
- Succeeded by: T. Kadambavana Sundaram
- Constituency: Aruppukottai

Personal details
- Party: Independent politician

M. D. Ramasami was an Indian politician and former Member of the Legislative Assembly of Tamil Nadu. He was elected to the Tamil Nadu legislative assembly as an independent candidate from Aruppukottai constituency in 1957 election.

Ramasami resigned his Lok Sabha seat on the afternoon of 25 March 1957.

== Electoral performance ==
Election	Constituency	Political party	Result	Vote %	Opposition			Ref
Election	Constituency	Political party	Result	Vote %	Candidate	Political party	Vote %	Ref
1952	Aruppukottai	Independent	Lost	42.42%	Jayarama Reddiar	INC	48.27%	
1957	Aruppukottai	Independent	Won	55.13%	A. V. Thiruppathi	INC	44.87%	
