= Sivasamy =

Sivasamy is an Indian surname. Notable people with the surname include:

- C. Sivasamy, Indian politician
- K. K. Sivasamy, Indian politician
