= P. Arasan =

Indian politician

P. Arasan was elected to the Tamil Nadu Legislative Assembly from the Aranthangi constituency in the 2001 elections. He was a candidate of the MGR Anna Dravida Munnetra Kazhagam (MADMK) party.

== Electoral performance ==
Election	Constituency	Political party	Result	Vote %	Opposition			Ref
Election	Constituency	Political party	Result	Vote %	Candidate	Political party	Vote %	Ref
2001	Aranthangi	MADMK	Won	45.99%	A. Chandrasekaran	INC	30.25%	
