= Sattur Assembly constituency =

One of the 234 State Legislative Assembly Constituencies in Tamil Nadu, in India

Coordinates: 9°21′45.13″N 77°53′36.97″E

Sattur
- Constituency No. 204 for the Tamil Nadu Legislative Assembly

Constituency details
- Country: India
- Region: South India
- State: Tamil Nadu
- District: Virudhunagar
- Lok Sabha constituency: Virudhunagar
- Established: 1951
- Total electors: 229,330

Member of Legislative Assembly
- 17th Tamil Nadu Legislative Assembly
- Incumbent A. Kadarkarairaj
- Party: DMK
- Alliance: SPA
- Elected year: 2026

Sattur is an assembly constituency located in Virudhunagar district in Tamil Nadu. It falls under Virudhunagar Lok Sabha constituency. The constituency served as the Chief Minister's constituency in the years 1957 and 1962 respectively, as it was won by then Chief Minister K. Kamaraj. It is one of the 234 State Legislative Assembly Constituencies in Tamil Nadu, in India.

== Members of Legislative Assembly ==
Year	Member	Political party
Madras State
1952	S. Ramaswamy Naidu	Indian National Congress
1957	K. Kamaraj	Indian National Congress
1962	K. Kamaraj	Indian National Congress
1967	S. Ramaswamy Naidu	Swatantra Party
Tamil Nadu
1971	S. Alagu Thevar	All India Forward Bloc
1977	K. K. S. S. R. Ramachandran	All India Anna Dravida Munnetra Kazhagam
1980	K. K. S. S. R. Ramachandran	All India Anna Dravida Munnetra Kazhagam
1984	K. K. S. S. R. Ramachandran	All India Anna Dravida Munnetra Kazhagam
1989	S. S. Karuppasamy	Dravida Munnetra Kazhagam
1991	K. K. S. S. R. Ramachandran	Thayaga Marumalarchi Kazhagam
1996	K. M. Vijayakumar	Dravida Munnetra Kazhagam
2001	K. K. S. S. R. Ramachandran	Dravida Munnetra Kazhagam
2006	K. K. S. S. R. Ramachandran	Dravida Munnetra Kazhagam
2011	R. B. Udhaya Kumar	All India Anna Dravida Munnetra Kazhagam
2016	S. G. Subramanian	All India Anna Dravida Munnetra Kazhagam
2019^	M. S. R. Rajavarman	All India Anna Dravida Munnetra Kazhagam
2021	A. R. R. Raghuraman	Marumalarchi Dravida Munnetra Kazhagam
2026	A. Kadarkarairaj	Dravida Munnetra Kazhagam

== Election results ==
Vote share of winning candidates
2026	31.23%
2021	38.68%
2019 by-election	42.20%
2016	40.65%
2011	58.32%
2006	49.58%
2001	42.91%
1996	43.20%
1991	48.63%
1989	42.01%
1984	51.03%
1980	44.10%
1977	43.24%
1971	55.43%
1967	64.11%
1962	56.38%
1957	53.46%
1952	48.00%

=== 2026 ===
2026 Tamil Nadu Legislative Assembly election: Sattur
Party	Candidate	Votes	%	±%
DMK	A. Kadarkarairaj	62,060	31.23	▼7.71
BJP	Nainar Nagenthran	56,071	28.21	
TVK	M. Ajith	53,498	26.92	New
AIPTMMK	Esakkiraja K	11,602	5.84	
NTK	D. Anandharaja	9,235	4.65	▼1.98
PT	S. Velmurugan	2,343	1.18	
NOTA	None of the above	476	0.24	
Margin of victory		5,989		
Turnout		1,98,734		
Rejected ballots				
Registered electors		227,963		

=== 2021 ===
2021 Tamil Nadu Legislative Assembly election: Sattur
Party	Candidate	Votes	%	±%
MDMK	A. R. R. Raghuraman	74,174	38.94	+0.81
AIADMK	R. K. Ravichandhran	62,995	33.07	−7.58
AMMK	M. S. R. Rajavarman	32,916	17.28	New
NTK	K. Pandi	12,626	6.63	+5.76
IJK	M. Bharathi	1,751	0.92	New
PT	G. Marikannan	1,599	0.84	New
NOTA	NOTA	1,297	0.68	−0.15
Margin of victory		11,179	5.87	3.35
Turnout		190,486	75.18	−3.04
Rejected ballots		218	0.11	
Registered electors		253,363		
MDMK gain from AIADMK		Swing	-1.71	

=== 2019 by-election ===
2019 Tamil Nadu Legislative Assembly by-elections: Sattur
Party	Candidate	Votes	%	±%
AIADMK	M. S. R. Rajavarman	76,977	42.20	+1.55
DMK	V. Srinivasan	76,521	41.60	+3.47
AMMK	S. G. Subramanian	12,428	6.84	+6.84
NTK	P. Sureshkumar	5,004	2.76	+1.90
MNM	N. Sundararaj	3,899	2.15	+2.15
NOTA	None of the Above	1,728	0.93	N/A
Majority		456	0.25	−2.37
Turnout		1,81,083	77.01	−1.30
Registered electors		2,36,696		
AIADMK hold		Swing	+1.55	

=== 2016 ===
2016 Tamil Nadu Legislative Assembly election: Sattur
Party	Candidate	Votes	%	±%
AIADMK	S. G. Subramanian	71,513	40.65	−17.67
DMK	V. Srinivasan	67,086	38.13	−0.94
MDMK	A. R. R. Raghuraman	25,442	14.46	New
BJP	P. Gnanapandithan	3,407	1.94	New
NTK	S. Muthuvel Nachiar	1,520	0.86	New
NOTA	NOTA	1,455	0.83	New
AIFB	K. Pasupathidevan	958	0.54	New
Margin of victory		4,427	2.52	−16.73
Turnout		175,939	78.22	−3.94
Registered electors		224,931		
AIADMK hold		Swing	-17.67	

=== 2011 ===
2011 Tamil Nadu Legislative Assembly election: Sattur
Party	Candidate	Votes	%	±%
AIADMK	R. B. Udhaya Kumar	88,918	58.32	+22.72
DMK	A. Kadarkarairaj	59,573	39.07	−10.51
Independent	P. Jayasankar	1,310	0.86	New
Margin of victory		29,345	19.25	5.27
Turnout		152,462	82.16	9.20
Registered electors		185,572		
AIADMK gain from DMK		Swing	8.74	

=== 2006 ===
2006 Tamil Nadu Legislative Assembly election: Sattur
Party	Candidate	Votes	%	±%
DMK	K. K. S. S. R. Ramachandran	73,918	49.58	+6.67
AIADMK	G. Chockeswaran	53,073	35.60	New
DMDK	S. S. K. Sankaralingam	15,391	10.32	New
BSP	R. Rajendran	1,560	1.05	New
AIFB	G. Sethu Ramalingam	1,447	0.97	New
Independent	G. Vairamuthu	1,104	0.74	New
BJP	R. Vetrivel	995	0.67	New
Margin of victory		20,845	13.98	10.71
Turnout		149,088	72.96	10.24
Registered electors		204,350		
DMK hold		Swing	6.67	

=== 2001 ===
2001 Tamil Nadu Legislative Assembly election: Sattur
Party	Candidate	Votes	%	±%
DMK	K. K. S. S. R. Ramachandran	57,953	42.91	−0.29
INC	A. Rajendran	53,538	39.64	New
MDMK	S. Rajachockalingam	19,338	14.32	+2.06
Independent	V. Jeyaram	1,296	0.96	New
Independent	A. Jeyasankar	740	0.55	New
Margin of victory		4,415	3.27	−3.59
Turnout		135,045	62.72	−7.70
Registered electors		215,350		
DMK hold		Swing	-0.29	

=== 1996 ===
1996 Tamil Nadu Legislative Assembly election: Sattur
Party	Candidate	Votes	%	±%
DMK	K. M. Vijayakumar	58,972	43.20	New
AIADMK	K. K. S. S. R. Ramachandran	49,608	36.34	−10.47
MDMK	M. Gnanaprakasam	16,732	12.26	New
Independent	C. Ramachandran	5,686	4.17	New
AIIC(T)	P. Thangavel	1,227	0.90	New
Margin of victory		9,364	6.86	5.04
Turnout		136,502	70.42	4.19
Registered electors		201,201		
DMK gain from Thayaga Marumalarchi Kazhagam		Swing	-5.43	

=== 1991 ===
1991 Tamil Nadu Legislative Assembly election: Sattur
Party	Candidate	Votes	%	±%
Thayaga Marumalarchi Kazhagam	K. K. S. S. R. Ramachandran	59,942	48.63	New
AIADMK	Sannasi Karuppasamy	57,703	46.81	+17.63
PMK	M. Gnanasekaran	1,673	1.36	New
Margin of victory		2,239	1.82	−11.01
Turnout		123,261	66.23	−7.60
Registered electors		192,024		
Thayaga Marumalarchi Kazhagam gain from DMK		Swing	6.62	

=== 1989 ===
1989 Tamil Nadu Legislative Assembly election: Sattur
Party	Candidate	Votes	%	±%
DMK	S. S. Karuppasamy	52,608	42.01	−2.59
AIADMK	R. Kothanaraman	36,546	29.18	−21.85
INC	P. Subbiah	17,375	13.87	New
AIADMK	V. Veerasubramanian	16,512	13.18	−37.85
Margin of victory		16,062	12.83	6.39
Turnout		125,236	73.84	−3.52
Registered electors		172,451		
DMK gain from AIADMK		Swing	-9.02	

=== 1984 ===
1984 Tamil Nadu Legislative Assembly election: Sattur
Party	Candidate	Votes	%	±%
AIADMK	K. K. S. S. R. Ramachandran	58,745	51.03	−18.37
DMK	S. S. Karuppasamy	51,338	44.60	+0.5
Independent	A. Narayanan	4,245	3.69	New
Margin of victory		7,407	6.43	−7.42
Turnout		115,117	77.36	13.80
Registered electors		152,911		
AIADMK hold		Swing	-18.37	

=== 1980 ===
1980 Tamil Nadu Legislative Assembly election: Sattur
Party	Candidate	Votes	%	±%
AIADMK	K. K. S. S. R. Ramachandran	54,720	69.40	+26.16
DMK	S. Saudi Sundara Barati	43,795	44.10	+34.46
Margin of victory		10,925	13.86	−5.04
Turnout		78,847	63.56	−6.83
Registered electors		125,588		
AIADMK hold		Swing	26.16	

=== 1977 ===
1977 Tamil Nadu Legislative Assembly election: Sattur
Party	Candidate	Votes	%	±%
AIADMK	K. K. S. S. R. Ramachandran	38,772	43.24	New
INC	M. Veerasamy	21,830	24.35	New
JP	S. Mookiah Nadar	16,748	18.68	New
DMK	V. Karamegasamy	8,637	9.63	New
Independent	S. Thurairaj	2,105	2.35	New
Independent	K. Gurusamy Naicker	606	0.68	New
Independent	T. Periyasamy	544	0.61	New
Margin of victory		16,942	18.90	4.63
Turnout		89,659	70.39	4.43
Registered electors		128,786		
AIADMK gain from AIFB		Swing	-12.19	

=== 1971 ===
1971 Tamil Nadu Legislative Assembly election: Sattur
Party	Candidate	Votes	%	±%
AIFB	S. Alagu Thevar	32,610	55.43	New
SWA	R. Dorairaj Naicker	24,216	41.16	New
Independent	P. Solaimalai	921	1.57	New
Independent	V. Srinivasan	528	0.90	New
Independent	K. Veluchaminaicker	407	0.69	New
Margin of victory		8,394	14.27	−13.96
Turnout		58,827	65.96	−17.91
Registered electors		96,002		
AIFB gain from SWA		Swing	-8.68	

=== 1967 ===
1967 Madras Legislative Assembly election: Sattur
Party	Candidate	Votes	%	±%
SWA	S. Ramaswamy Naidu	45,223	64.11	New
INC	R. Krishnasamy Naidu	25,313	35.89	−20.5
Margin of victory		19,910	28.23	12.08
Turnout		70,536	83.87	−0.75
Registered electors		86,398		
SWA gain from INC		Swing	7.73	

=== 1962 ===
1962 Madras Legislative Assembly election: Sattur
Party	Candidate	Votes	%	±%
INC	K. Kamaraj (Chief Minister)	46,950	56.38	+2.92
SWA	P. Ramamoorthy	33,506	40.24	New
Independent	R. Ramasamy Reddiar	2,811	3.38	New
Margin of victory		13,444	16.15	9.22
Turnout		83,267	84.63	9.60
Registered electors		101,991		
INC hold		Swing	2.92	

=== 1957 ===
1957 Madras Legislative Assembly election: Sattur
Party	Candidate	Votes	%	±%
INC	K. Kamaraj (Chief Minister)	36,400	53.46	+5.47
Independent	Jayarama Reddiar	31,683	46.54	New
Margin of victory		4,717	6.93	4.59
Turnout		68,083	75.03	3.55
Registered electors		90,740		
INC hold		Swing	5.47	

=== 1952 ===
1952 Madras Legislative Assembly election: Sattur
Party	Candidate	Votes	%	±%
INC	S. Ramaswamy Naidu	21,038	48.00	New
Independent	Rajarathnam	20,012	45.66	New
Independent	Rajamani	2,781	6.34	New
Margin of victory		1,026	2.34	
Turnout		43,831	71.48	
Registered electors		61,321		
INC win (new seat)				
