= Arantangi Assembly constituency =

One of the 234 State Legislative Assembly Constituencies in Tamil Nadu, in India

Coordinates: 10.1631°N 78.9962°E

Arantangi
- Constituency No. 183 for the Tamil Nadu Legislative Assembly

Constituency details
- Country: India
- Region: South India
- State: Tamil Nadu
- District: Pudukottai
- Lok Sabha constituency: Ramanathapuram
- Established: 1951
- Total electors: 2,29,834
- Reservation: None

Member of Legislative Assembly
- 17th Tamil Nadu Legislative Assembly
- Incumbent Mohamed Farvas.J
- Party: TVK
- Elected year: 2026

Arantangi is a constituency in the Tamil Nadu legislative assembly, that includes the city of Aranthangi in Pudukkottai district. It is a part of Ramanathapuram Lok Sabha constituency. It is one of the 234 State Legislative Assembly Constituencies in Tamil Nadu, in India.

== Members of Legislative Assembly ==
Year	Member	Political party
Madras State
1952	Mahamad Salihu Maraicair	Indian National Congress
1957	S. Ramasami Thevar	Indian National Congress
1962	A. Durai Arasan	Dravida Munnetra Kazhagam
1967	A. Durai Arasan	Dravida Munnetra Kazhagam
Tamil Nadu
1971	S. Ramanathan	Dravida Munnetra Kazhagam
1977	Su. Thirunavukkarasar	All India Anna Dravida Munnetra Kazhagam
1980	Su. Thirunavukkarasar	All India Anna Dravida Munnetra Kazhagam
1984	Su. Thirunavukkarasar	All India Anna Dravida Munnetra Kazhagam
1989	Su. Thirunavukkarasar	All India Anna Dravida Munnetra Kazhagam
1991	Su. Thirunavukkarasar	All India Anna Dravida Munnetra Kazhagam
1996 (Note: Su. Thirunavukkarasar, gave his seat up to his mentor C. Anbarasan, who defeated Raja Paramasivam of All India Anna Dravida Munnetra Kazhagam. S. Thirunavukkarasu resigned to be an MP for Pudukkottai Lok Sabha constituency)	Su. Thirunavukkarasar	MGR Anna Dravida Munnetra Kazhagam
1999 (Note: By-Election was held and C. Anbarasan died later in July 2000 leaving the seat vacant, next election was held in the next general election.)	C. Anbarasan	MGR Anna Dravida Munnetra Kazhagam
2001	P. Arasan	MGR Anna Dravida Munnetra Kazhagam
2006	Udayam Shanmugam	Dravida Munnetra Kazhagam
2011	M. Rajanayagam	All India Anna Dravida Munnetra Kazhagam
2016	E. Rathinasabhapathy	All India Anna Dravida Munnetra Kazhagam
2021	T. Ramachandran	Indian National Congress
2026	J. Mohamed Farvas	Tamilaga Vettri Kazhagam

== Election results ==
Vote share the winning candidates
2026	48.85%
2021	48.85%
2016	45.22%
2011	52.77%
2006	43.86%
2001	45.99%
1996	50.10%
1991	56.46%
1989	47.58%
1984	62.68%
1980	49.50%
1977	37.45%
1971	55.81%
1967	53.11%
1962	55.25%
1957	43.22%
1952	52.81%

=== 2026 ===
2026 Tamil Nadu Legislative Assembly election: Aranthangi
Party	Candidate	Votes	%	±%
TVK	Mohamed Farvas.J	73,244	40.08	New
INC	Ramachandran.T	63,182	34.58	▼14.27
BJP	Kavitha Srikanth	31,456	17.21	New
Independent	Shahul Hameed.N	798	0.44	New
TVK	Nazim Khan.M	774	0.42	New
Independent	Kalimuthu.P	762	0.42	New
NOTA	NOTA	580	0.32	
Independent	Dhetchna Moorthy.Doctor.S	408	0.22	▼0.42
Independent	Abdul Jaffar.S	322	0.18	New
Independent	Murugarethinam.T	305	0.17	New
Independent	Sundar.A	293	0.16	New
Independent	Arunagiri.M	210	0.11	New
Independent	Karthikeyan.N	149	0.08	New
Independent	Aiyappan	138	0.08	New
Independent	Udaiyappan.M	134	0.07	New
Margin of victory		10,062	5.50	▼12.94
Turnout		1,82,730	79.51	▲8.83
Registered electors		2,29,834		▼7,190
TVK gain from INC		Swing	▲40.08	

=== 2021 ===
2021 Tamil Nadu Legislative Assembly election: Arantangi
Party	Candidate	Votes	%	±%
INC	T. Ramachandran	81,835	48.85%	5.11%
AIADMK	M. Rajanayagam	50,942	30.41%	−14.81%
AMMK	Sivashanmugam K	4,699	2.80%	
Independent	Velraj. K P	3,164	1.89%	
Independent	Muthuselvam V	2,164	1.29%	
Independent	Dhetchena Moorthy. Dr. S	1,080	0.64%	
MNM	Shaik Mohamed B	966	0.58%	
Margin of victory		30,893	18.44%	16.96%
Turnout		1,67,524	70.68%	−1.43%
Rejected ballots		27	0.02%	
Registered electors		2,37,024		
INC gain from AIADMK		Swing	3.63%	

=== 2016 ===
2016 Tamil Nadu Legislative Assembly election: Arantangi
Party	Candidate	Votes	%	±%
AIADMK	E. Rathinasabhapathy E	69,905	45.22%	−7.55%
INC	T. Ramachandran	67,614	43.74%	3.98%
CPI	Loganathan P	6,341	4.10%	
SDPI	Kulam Mohamed M	1,741	1.13%	
Independent	Puviyarasan A	1,238	0.80%	
TMMK	Arul Justin Diraviam C	1,176	0.76%	
IJK	Gemini Ganesan M	922	0.60%	
Independent	Narasimhan H	794	0.51%	
NOTA	None Of The Above	775	0.50%	
BSP	Xavier A	720	0.47%	
Margin of victory		2,291	1.48%	−11.53%
Turnout		1,54,597	72.11%	−2.95%
Registered electors		2,14,394		
AIADMK hold		Swing	-7.55%	

=== 2011 ===
2011 Tamil Nadu Legislative Assembly election: Arantangi
Party	Candidate	Votes	%	±%
AIADMK	M. Rajanayagam	67,559	52.77%	21.00%
INC	Su. Thirunavukkarasar	50,903	39.76%	
Independent	Shariff Km	2,729	2.13%	
IJK	Appa Durai S	2,305	1.80%	
BJP	Sabapathi K	2,218	1.73%	−8.46%
Independent	Ashrab Khan S	1,211	0.95%	
Independent	Asaiyamani. M	599	0.47%	
Independent	Karunakaran K	503	0.39%	
Margin of victory		16,656	13.01%	0.92%
Turnout		1,70,564	75.06%	4.78%
Registered electors		1,28,027		
AIADMK gain from DMK		Swing	8.91%	

=== 2006 ===
2006 Tamil Nadu Legislative Assembly election: Arantangi
Party	Candidate	Votes	%	±%
DMK	Udayam Shanmugam	63,333	43.86%	
AIADMK	Karthikeyan. Y	45,873	31.77%	
DMDK	Mohamed Ali Jinnah. O. S. M	15,347	10.63%	
BJP	Kathamuthu. Kl	14,713	10.19%	
Independent	Ramanathan. G	2,304	1.60%	
Independent	Mudiappan. G	543	0.38%	
Independent	Munusamy. K	469	0.32%	
Independent	Murugan. K	413	0.29%	
Independent	Hussain Beevi. K. P	395	0.27%	
Independent	Mahalingam. N	264	0.18%	
Independent	Shanmugam. P	207	0.14%	
Margin of victory		17,460	12.09%	−3.65%
Turnout		1,44,402	70.28%	12.83%
Registered electors		2,05,474		
DMK gain from MADMK		Swing	-2.13%	

=== 2001 ===
2001 Tamil Nadu Legislative Assembly election: Arantangi
Party	Candidate	Votes	%	±%
MADMK	P. Arasan	58,499	45.99%	
INC	Chandrasekaran. A	38,481	30.25%	
Independent	Mohamed Ali Jinnah O. S. M	16,620	13.07%	
MDMK	Mahendran. R	8,483	6.67%	4.51%
Independent	Ramu E	1,859	1.46%	
Independent	Arockiasamy U. S.	1,250	0.98%	
Independent	Ramasmy. M	1,052	0.83%	
Independent	Chelliah Devar. C	960	0.75%	
Margin of victory		20,018	15.74%	5.59%
Turnout		1,27,204	57.45%	−13.96%
Registered electors		2,21,413		
MADMK gain from AIADMK		Swing	-4.11%	

=== 1996 ===
1996 Tamil Nadu Legislative Assembly election: Arantangi
Party	Candidate	Votes	%	±%
AIADMK	Su. Thirunavukkarasar	70,260	50.10%	10.08%
DMK	Shanmugam. S.	56,028	39.95%	
Independent	Sesurasu. M.	6,688	4.77%	
MDMK	Janardhanan. A. B. R.	3,031	2.16%	
BJP	Manivasagam. K.	1,104	0.79%	−0.94%
Independent	Mohamed Ossali. M. A.	962	0.69%	
Independent	Ponmuthuramalingam. S.	475	0.34%	
Independent	Gandhirasan. V.	245	0.17%	
Independent	Chandrasekaran Udayar. S.	193	0.14%	
JP	Saravanakumar. A.	179	0.13%	
Independent	Sakadevan. M.	128	0.09%	
Margin of victory		14,232	10.15%	−6.29%
Turnout		1,40,242	71.41%	0.43%
Registered electors		2,05,492		
AIADMK gain from Thayaga Marumalarchi Kazhagam		Swing	-6.36%	

=== 1991 ===
1991 Tamil Nadu Legislative Assembly election: Arantangi
Party	Candidate	Votes	%	±%
APTTMK	Su. Thirunavukkarasar	73,571	56.46%	
AIADMK	Chelliah Kuzha	52,150	40.02%	−7.55%
BJP	Muthuvel A. K.	2,254	1.73%	1.19%
Independent	Gani Rowther A.	835	0.64%	
THMM	Thangavelu M.	246	0.19%	
Independent	Sakadevan M.	176	0.14%	
Independent	Kalyani Viyasar	169	0.13%	
Independent	Manthirikumar M.	153	0.12%	
Independent	Chittarvel A.	148	0.11%	
Independent	Velappan C.	127	0.10%	
Independent	Jayathiran K.	117	0.09%	
Margin of victory		21,421	16.44%	−0.29%
Turnout		1,30,301	70.97%	−6.99%
Registered electors		1,91,195		
Thayaga Marumalarchi Kazhagam gain from AIADMK		Swing	8.88%	

=== 1989 ===
1989 Tamil Nadu Legislative Assembly election: Arantangi
Party	Candidate	Votes	%	±%
AIADMK	Su. Thirunavukkarasar	61,730	47.58%	−15.10%
DMK	Shanmugasundaram M.	40,027	30.85%	−5.09%
AIADMK	Venkatasalam. A	13,375	10.31%	−52.37%
INC	Kalander Naina Mohammed S.	10,512	8.10%	
Independent	Viyasar. R.	1,582	1.22%	
Independent	Kalandar Maitheen N.	767	0.59%	
BJP	Pulikkutti S.	704	0.54%	
Independent	Murugesan R.	406	0.31%	
Independent	Velappan C.	281	0.22%	
Independent	Mohananraj V.	241	0.19%	
Independent	Alagesan. V.	73	0.06%	
Margin of victory		21,703	16.73%	−10.01%
Turnout		1,29,746	77.96%	−2.85%
Registered electors		1,70,036		
AIADMK hold		Swing	-15.10%	

=== 1984 ===
1984 Tamil Nadu Legislative Assembly election: Arantangi
Party	Candidate	Votes	%	±%
AIADMK	Su. Thirunavukkarasar	70,101	62.68%	13.17%
DMK	Ramanathan. S.	40,197	35.94%	
Independent	Viyasar. R.	924	0.83%	
Independent	Karuppiah Servai. S.	622	0.56%	
Margin of victory		29,904	26.74%	12.83%
Turnout		1,11,844	80.82%	5.04%
Registered electors		1,45,705		
AIADMK hold		Swing	13.17%	

=== 1980 ===
1980 Tamil Nadu Legislative Assembly election: Arantangi
Party	Candidate	Votes	%	±%
AIADMK	Su. Thirunavukkarasar	50,792	49.50%	12.05%
Independent	Mohamed Mashood. M.	36,519	35.59%	
Independent	Ramanathan. C.	8,769	8.55%	
JP	Muthiah Allias Pappa N.	4,388	4.28%	
Independent	Karuppiah Muthiraiyar Mandangudi. M.	1,477	1.44%	
Independent	Mani. K. M. P.	485	0.47%	
Independent	Viyazar. R.	174	0.17%	
Margin of victory		14,273	13.91%	2.36%
Turnout		1,02,604	75.78%	−0.54%
Registered electors		1,36,966		
AIADMK hold		Swing	12.05%	

=== 1977 ===
1977 Tamil Nadu Legislative Assembly election: Arantangi
Party	Candidate	Votes	%	±%
AIADMK	Su. Thirunavukkarasar	35,468	37.45%	
CPI	P. Appukutty	24,528	25.90%	
DMK	S. Ramanathan	22,052	23.28%	−32.52%
JP	R. Karuppaiah	7,335	7.75%	
Independent	S.R.M. Iyooboo	4,397	4.64%	
Independent	M. James	511	0.54%	
Independent	R. Viyasar	415	0.44%	
Margin of victory		10,940	11.55%	−2.06%
Turnout		94,706	76.32%	−4.83%
Registered electors		1,25,574		
AIADMK gain from DMK		Swing	-18.36%	

=== 1971 ===
1971 Tamil Nadu Legislative Assembly election: Arantangi
Party	Candidate	Votes	%	±%
DMK	S. Ramanathan	49,322	55.81%	2.70%
INC	Ramanathan Servaikarar	37,289	42.19%	−2.98%
Independent	M. Aruisamy	1,766	2.00%	
Margin of victory		12,033	13.62%	5.67%
Turnout		88,377	81.14%	−2.82%
Registered electors		1,11,761		
DMK hold		Swing	2.70%	

=== 1967 ===
1967 Madras Legislative Assembly election: Arantangi
Party	Candidate	Votes	%	±%
DMK	A. Thurairasan	42,943	53.11%	−2.14%
INC	K. B. Dervaikarar	36,522	45.17%	4.10%
Independent	A. Perianayagam	1,388	1.72%	
Margin of victory		6,421	7.94%	−6.24%
Turnout		80,853	83.97%	12.00%
Registered electors		99,142		
DMK hold		Swing	-2.14%	

=== 1962 ===
1962 Madras Legislative Assembly election: Arantangi
Party	Candidate	Votes	%	±%
DMK	A. Durai Arasan	33,781	55.25%	
INC	K. Ramanathan Servai	25,112	41.07%	5.21%
We Tamils	M. Manickam	2,250	3.68%	
Margin of victory		8,669	14.18%	6.82%
Turnout		61,143	71.97%	25.91%
Registered electors		87,806		
DMK gain from Independent		Swing	12.03%	

=== 1957 ===
1957 Madras Legislative Assembly election: Arantangi
Party	Candidate	Votes	%	±%
Independent	S. Ramasami Thevar	17,637	43.22%	
INC	Muthuvel Ambalam	14,633	35.86%	−16.95%
Independent	Sheik Abdul Kadir Rowther	4,423	10.84%	
Independent	Swaminatha Ayyar	2,276	5.58%	
Independent	M. Ramasami Thevar	1,838	4.50%	
Margin of victory		3,004	7.36%	−2.97%
Turnout		40,807	46.05%	−9.79%
Registered electors		88,613		
Independent gain from INC		Swing	-9.59%	

=== 1952 ===
1952 Madras Legislative Assembly election: Arantangi
Party	Candidate	Votes	%	±%
INC	Mahamad Salihu Maraicair	19,064	52.81%	52.81%
Independent	Ramaswami Thovar	15,335	42.48%	
Independent	Yusuf Rowther	1,698	4.70%	
Margin of victory		3,729	10.33%	
Turnout		36,097	55.84%	
Registered electors		64,647		
INC win (new seat)				
