= E. Rathinasabhapathy =

Indian politician

Member-Tamil Nadu Legislative Assembly
- In office 2016–2021
- Preceded by: M. Rajanayagam
- Succeeded by: T. Ramachandran
- Constituency: Arantangi

Personal details
- Born: 31 May 1955 Nerkuppam
- Party: All India Anna Dravida Munnetra Kazhagam
- Profession: Farmer

E. Rathinasabhapathy is an Indian politician and former member of the Tamil Nadu Legislative Assembly. Rathinasabhapathy hails from the Nerkupam area of Pudukkottai district. Rathinasabhapathy, who completed his school education up to the tenth grade, belongs to the All India Anna Dravida Munnetra Kazhagam (AIADMK) party. He successfully contested and won the Arantangi Assembly constituency in the 2016 Tamil Nadu Legislative Assembly election to become a Member of Legislative Assembly (MLA).

== Electoral performance ==
Election	Constituency	Political party	Result	Vote %	Opposition			Ref
Election	Constituency	Political party	Result	Vote %	Candidate	Political party	Vote %	Ref
2016	Aranthangi	AIADMK	Won	45.22%	T. Ramachandran	INC	43.74%	
