= Tiruchuli Assembly constituency =

State Assembly Constituency in India

Coordinates: 9.53°N 78.20°E

Tiruchuli
- Constituency No. 208 for the Tamil Nadu Legislative Assembly

Constituency details
- Country: India
- Region: South India
- State: Tamil Nadu
- Established: 1962 (first establishment); 2008 (second establishment)
- Total electors: 205,301

Member of Legislative Assembly
- 17th Tamil Nadu Legislative Assembly
- Incumbent Thangam Thennarasu
- Party: DMK
- Alliance: SPA
- Elected year: 2026

Tiruchuli is a state assembly constituency in Virudhunagar district of Tamil Nadu. It comes under Ramanathapuram Lok Sabha constituency for parliament elections. It was created for the second time after the delimitation of constituencies in 2008. It is one of the 234 State Legislative Assembly Constituencies in Tamil Nadu in India.

Some of the major demands of Tiruchuzhi Assembly constituency include the construction of a new bus stand at Tiruchuzhi and Narikkudi; to upgrade the bus stands present in Kariyapatti and Veerachozhan; to make a stoppage of the Silambu Express at Tiruchuzhi and Narikkudi Railway Stations; to create New SIDCO and SIPCOT Industrial Complexes at Tiruchuzhi; and to upgrade the Major District Road (NH 195), (MDR 718) and (MDR 638) to a National Highway which would be present in-between Nedungulam to Abhiramam via Narikudi and Veerachozhan.

== Extent ==
It comprises Kariapatti Union, Narikkudi Union, Tiruchuli Union, Aruppukkottai Taluk (part): Kulasekaranallur, Mangulam, Melakandamangalam, Kurunaikulam, Konganakurichi, Aladipatti, Bommakottai, Kallorani, Savaspuram, Kullampatti, Muthuramalingapuram, Narthampatti, Kalayarkarisalkulam, Kalyanasundarapuram, Kallumadam, Erasinnampatti, Parattanatham, Thammanaickenpatti, Vedanatham, Silukkapatti, Mandapasalai, Maravarperungudi, Thummuchinnampatti, Thirumalaipuram, Salukkuvarpatti, Suthamadam, Thoppalakarai, Rajagopalapuram, Pullanaickenpatti, Chettikulam, Kanakai, Paralachi, Melaiyur, Vadakkunatham, Therkunatham, Sengulam, Poolangal Kallakkari, Keelkudi and Purasalur, Keppilingampatti, and Azhagiyanallur villages.

== Members of Legislative Assembly ==
Year	Winner	Party
2011	Thangam Thennarasu	Dravida Munnetra Kazhagam
2016	Thangam Thennarasu	Dravida Munnetra Kazhagam
2021	Thangam Thennarasu	Dravida Munnetra Kazhagam
2026	Thangam Thennarasu	Dravida Munnetra Kazhagam

== Election results ==
Vote share of winning candidates
2026	41.43%
2021	59.41%
2016	53.61%
2011	54.36%
1962	55.94%

=== 2026 ===
2026 Tamil Nadu Legislative Assembly election: Tiruchuli
Party	Candidate	Votes	%	±%
DMK	Thangam Thennarasu	75,085	41.43	▼17.98
TVK	S. Samayan	61,600	33.99	New
AIADMK	M. S. R. Rajavarman	25,581	14.11	▼9.85
NTK	Avarangadu Karthik Raja	12,763	7.04	▼0.97
PT	Gunasekaran G	1,248	0.69	
AIPTMMK	Murugesapandian T	1,107	0.61	
Independent	Malai Alagu M	631	0.35	
Independent	Advocate Thangapandian	525	0.29	
NOTA	NOTA	425	0.23	▼0.20
Margin of victory		13,485	7.44	▼28.01
Turnout		179,085	87.66	▲10.02
Registered electors		204,293		
DMK hold		Swing	▼17.98%	

=== 2021 ===
2021 Tamil Nadu Legislative Assembly election: Tiruchuli
Party	Candidate	Votes	%	±%
DMK	Thangam Thennarasu	102,225	59.41%	+5.8
AIADMK	S. Rajasekar	41,233	23.96%	−13.8
NTK	A. Anandhajothi	13,787	8.01%	New
AMMK	K. K. Sivasamy	6,441	3.74%	New
Independent	V. Arunkumar	2,492	1.45%	New
MNM	S. Murugan	1,356	0.79%	New
Independent	R. Adaikalam	898	0.52%	New
NOTA	NOTA	740	0.43	−0.36
Margin of victory		60,992	35.45%	19.60%
Turnout		172,071	77.84%	−3.14%
Rejected ballots		142	0.08%	
Registered electors		221,055		
DMK hold		Swing	5.80%	

=== 2016 ===
2016 Tamil Nadu Legislative Assembly election: Tiruchuli
Party	Candidate	Votes	%	±%
DMK	Thangam Thennarasu	89,927	53.61%	−0.75
AIADMK	K. Dinesh Babu	63,350	37.77%	−3.3
DMDK	T. Raju	5,799	3.46%	New
BJP	B. Ravirajan	1,779	1.06%	−0.27
NOTA	NOTA	1,328	0.79%	New
Independent	G. Vairaseeman	1,074	0.64%	New
Margin of victory		26,577	15.84%	2.56%
Turnout		167,742	80.98%	−3.52%
Registered electors		207,142		
DMK hold		Swing	-0.75%	

=== 2011 ===
2011 Tamil Nadu Legislative Assembly election: Tiruchuli
Party	Candidate	Votes	%	±%
DMK	Thangam Thennarasu	81,613	54.36%	New
AIADMK	U. Esakki	61,661	41.07%	New
BJP	P. Vijaya Ragunathan	1,998	1.33%	New
Independent	A. Ramamoorthy	1,103	0.73%	New
BSP	M. Arumugam	1,082	0.72%	New
Margin of victory		19,952	13.29%	
Turnout		150,146	84.50%	
Registered electors		177,683		
DMK win (new seat)				

=== 1962 ===
1962 Madras Legislative Assembly election: Tiruchuli
Party	Candidate	Votes	%	±%
AIFB	A. Perumal	28,524	55.94%	New
INC	M. Vellathurai	18,428	36.14%	New
Independent	R. Muthu	4,038	7.92%	New
Margin of victory		10,096	19.80%	
Turnout		50,990	59.23%	
Registered electors		90,401		
AIFB win (new seat)				
