= M. Rajanayagam =

Indian politician

M. Rajanayagam is an Indian politician and former member of the Tamil Nadu Legislative Assembly from the Arantangi constituency. He represents the All India Anna Dravida Munnetra Kazhagam party.

== Electoral performance ==
| Election | Constituency | Political party | Result | Vote % | Opposition | | | Ref |
| Election | Constituency | Political party | Result | Vote % | Candidate | Political party | Vote % | Ref |
|---|---|---|---|---|---|---|---|---|
| 2011 | Aranthangi | AIADMK | Won | 52.77% | Su. Thirunavukkarasar | INC | 39.76% | |
| 2021 | Aranthangi | AIADMK | Lost | 30.41% | T. Ramachandran | INC | 48.85% | - |
