= S. G. Subramanian =

Indian politician

S. G. Subramanian was an Indian politician and former Member of the Legislative Assembly of Tamil Nadu. He was elected to the Tamil Nadu legislative assembly as an All India Anna Dravida Munnetra Kazhagam candidate from Sattur constituency in the 2016.

He was one of the 18 members who were disqualified by Speaker P. Dhanapal as they withdrew support to Chief Minister Edappadi K. Palaniswami and became loyal to rebel leader T.T.V. Dhinakaran and joined his party Amma Makkal Munnetra Kazhagam.

== Electoral performance ==
2019 Tamil Nadu Legislative Assembly by-elections: Sattur
Party	Candidate	Votes	%	±%
AIADMK	M. S. R. Rajavarman	76,977	42.20	+1.55
DMK	V. Srinivasan	76,521	41.60	+3.47
AMMK	S. G. Subramanian	12,428	6.84	+6.84
NTK	P. Sureshkumar	5,004	2.76	+1.90
MNM	N. Sundararaj	3,899	2.15	+2.15
NOTA	None of the Above	1,728	0.93	N/A
Majority		456	0.25	−2.37
Turnout		1,81,083	77.01	−1.30
Registered electors		2,36,696		
AIADMK hold		Swing	+1.55	

2016 Tamil Nadu Legislative Assembly election: Sattur
Party	Candidate	Votes	%	±%
AIADMK	S. G. Subramanian	71,513	40.65%	−17.67
DMK	V. Srinivasan	67,086	38.13%	−0.94
MDMK	A. R. R. Raghuraman	25,442	14.46%	New
BJP	P. Gnanapandithan	3,407	1.94%	New
NTK	S. Muthuvel Nachiar	1,520	0.86%	New
NOTA	NOTA	1,455	0.83%	New
AIFB	K. Pasupathidevan	958	0.54%	New
Margin of victory		4,427	2.52%	−16.73%
Turnout		175,939	78.22%	−3.94%
Registered electors		224,931		
AIADMK hold		Swing	-17.67%	
