= C. Anbarasan =

Indian politician

C. Anbarasan (died 29 June 2000) was a member of the Tamil Nadu Legislative Assembly in India. He was elected for the Arantangi state assembly constituency in a February 2000 by-election. He replaced S. Thirunavukkarasu, who had held the constituency since 1977 but had to resign the seat on winning the Pudukottai Lok Sabha constituency. Anbarasan, who had previously mentored Thirunavukkarasu, contested the seat as a candidate of the MGR Anna Dravida Munnetra Kazhagam.

Anbarasan died on 29 June 2000.
