= Agni Paarvai =

- Poster
- Directed by: P. Madhavan
- Screenplay by: Su. Thirunavukkarasar
- Story by: Nambiyur Tamilmani
- Produced by: S. Selvarethinam
- Starring: Su. Thirunavukkarasar; Nizhalgal Ravi; Saranya Ponvannan; Ramkumar; Anju
- Cinematography: R. H. Ashok
- Edited by: Srinivas Krishna
- Music by: Ilaiyaraaja
- Production company: Ponmanam Films
- Release date: 7 February 1992
- Running time: 130 minutes
- Country: India
- Language: Tamil

Agni Paarvai (transl. Fiery vision) is a 1992 Indian Tamil-language crime film directed by P. Madhavan. The film stars Su. Thirunavukkarasar, Nizhalgal Ravi, Saranya Ponvannan, Ramkumar and Anju. It was released on 7 February 1992.

== Plot ==
Raja (Su. Thirunavukkarasar) is an honest police inspector who is transferred to a new department. In his new area, the politician Inbasekharan (Nizhalgal Ravi) controls everything and cannot hesitate to kill those who face him. First, Inbasekhar tries to bribe Raja but he refuses. In the meantime, Sundar (Ramkumar) falls in love with the minister's daughter Shanthi (Anju). Later, Shanthi takes revenge on the poor man Sundar because he won the college first prize. Sundar is expelled from the college and he becomes an auto-driver. Shanthi develops a soft spot for Sundar while Inbasekharan wants to marry her. Thereafter, Inbasekharan's brother kills Raja's sister. Thus, Raja challenges Inbasekharan to punish him. What transpires later forms the crux of the story.

== Cast ==
- Su. Thirunavukkarasar as Inspector Raja
- Nizhalgal Ravi as MLA Inbasekharan
- Saranya Ponvannan as Seetha
- Ramkumar as Sundar
- Anju as Shanthi
- K. R. Vijaya as Raja's mother
- Radha Ravi as Minister Thirumurthy
- S. S. Chandran as Devaraj
- Chinni Jayanth
- Amirtharaj
- Disco Shanti
- Poorani
- Deepta
- S. N. Lakshmi
- Vasuki as Bhagyalakshmi
- Sathyapriya
- Baby Sathya
- Master Tinku
- S. Selvarethinam

== Production ==
The film marked the acting debut of politician Su. Thirunavukkarasar in leading role.

== Soundtrack ==
The soundtrack was composed by Ilaiyaraaja.

Song	Singer(s)	Lyrics	Duration
"Ethana Raathiri"	Swarnalatha, Malaysia Vasudevan	Vaali	4:54
"Ithazh Inikka"	K. S. Chithra, Mano	Kuruvikkarambai Shanmugam	5:06
"Ohm Kousalya"	Mano, K. S. Chithra	Gangai Amaran	4:55
"Paarthen Pon Manam"	S. Janaki	Vaali	5:06
"Thappu Thappu"	S. Janaki	Pulamaipithan	4:50
