= V. G. Manimeghalai =

Indian politician

V. G. Manimeghalai is an Indian politician and former Member of the Legislative Assembly of Tamil Nadu. She was elected to the Tamil Nadu legislative assembly as an Anna Dravida Munnetra Kazhagam candidate from Aruppukottai constituency in 1991 election.

== Electoral performance ==
Election	Constituency	Political party	Result	Vote %	Opposition			Ref
Election	Constituency	Political party	Result	Vote %	Candidate	Political party	Vote %	Ref
1991	Aruppukottai	AIADMK	Won	58.91%	R. M. Shanmuga Sundaram	DMK	38.32%	
