= M. Pitchai =

Indian politician

M. Pitchai is an Indian politician and former Member of the Legislative Assembly of Tamil Nadu. He was elected to the Tamil Nadu legislative assembly as an Anna Dravida Munnetra Kazhagam candidate from Aruppukottai constituency in 1980 and 1984 elections.

== Electoral performance ==
Election	Constituency	Political party	Result	Vote %	Opposition			Ref
Election	Constituency	Political party	Result	Vote %	Candidate	Political party	Vote %	Ref
1980	Aruppukottai	AIADMK	Won	53.67%	V. Thangapandian	DMK	38.95%	
1984	Aruppukottai	AIADMK	Won	45.32%	V. Thangapandian	DMK	41.42%	
