= A. Kadarkarairaj =

Indian politician (born 1959)

Alagarsamy Kadarkarairaj (born 1959) is an Indian politician from Tamil Nadu. He is a member of the Tamil Nadu Legislative Assembly from the Sattur Assembly constituency in Virudhunagar district representing the Dravida Munnetra Kazhagam (DMK).

== Early life ==
Kadarkarairaj is from Sattur, Virudhunagar district, Tamil Nadu. He is the son of Alagarsamy. He studied at Ramamurthy Government Higher Secondary School, Nadupatti but dropped out without completing Class 10 in 1975. He runs his own business and is also into farming. He declared assets worth Rs.2.7 crore in his affidavit to the Election Commission of India.

== Career ==
Kadarkarairaj entered electoral politics for the first time contesting the 2011Tamil Nadu Legislative Assembly election from Sattur on Dravida Munnetra Kazhagam (DMK) ticket but lost R. B. Udhaya Kumar of the All India Anna Dravida Munnetra Kazhagam, by a margin of 29,345 votes. He won the Sattur Assembly constituency representing the DMK in the 2026 Tamil Nadu Legislative Assembly election. He polled 62,060 votes and defeated his nearest rival, Nainar Nagendran of the Bharatiya Janata Party, by a margin of 5,989 votes.
