= A. R. R. Raghuraman =

Indian politician

Member of the Tamil Nadu Legislative Assembly
- In office 2 May 2021 – 4 May 2026
- Preceded by: R. K. Ravichandhran
- Constituency: Sattur

Personal details
- Party: Marumalarchi Dravida Munnetra Kazhagam

A. R. R. Raghuraman is an Indian politician who is a Member of Legislative Assembly of Tamil Nadu. He was elected from Sattur as a Dravida Munnetra Kazhagam candidate in 2021.

== Electoral performance ==
2021 Tamil Nadu Legislative Assembly election: Sattur
Party	Candidate	Votes	%	±%
MDMK	A. R. R. Raghuraman	74,174	38.94%	+0.81
AIADMK	R. K. Ravichandhran	62,995	33.07%	−7.58
AMMK	M. S. R. Rajavarman	32,916	17.28%	New
NTK	K. Pandi	12,626	6.63%	+5.76
IJK	M. Bharathi	1,751	0.92%	New
PT	G. Marikannan	1,599	0.84%	New
NOTA	NOTA	1,297	0.68%	−0.15
Margin of victory		11,179	5.87%	3.35%
Turnout		190,486	75.18%	−3.04%
Rejected ballots		218	0.11%	
Registered electors		253,363		
MDMK gain from AIADMK		Swing	-1.71%	

2016 Tamil Nadu Legislative Assembly election: Sattur
Party	Candidate	Votes	%	±%
AIADMK	S. G. Subramanian	71,513	40.65%	−17.67
DMK	V. Srinivasan	67,086	38.13%	−0.94
MDMK	A. R. R. Raghuraman	25,442	14.46%	New
BJP	P. Gnanapandithan	3,407	1.94%	New
NTK	S. Muthuvel Nachiar	1,520	0.86%	New
NOTA	NOTA	1,455	0.83%	New
AIFB	K. Pasupathidevan	958	0.54%	New
Margin of victory		4,427	2.52%	−16.73%
Turnout		175,939	78.22%	−3.94%
Registered electors		224,931		
AIADMK hold		Swing	-17.67%	
