= J. Jayavardhan =

Member Parliament of India

Member of the India Parliament for Chennai South
- In office 1 September 2014 – 23 May 2019
- Succeeded by: Thamizhachi Thangapandian
- Constituency: Chennai South

Personal details
- Born: 29 May 1987 (age 39) Royapuram, Chennai, Tamil Nadu, India
- Party: All India Anna Dravida Munnetra Kazhagam
- Spouse: Smt.Swarnalakshmi
- Children: 1
- Parent: D. Jayakumar (father)
- Education: Sri Ramachandra Medical College and Research Institute
- Occupation: General physician
- Website: drjayavardhan.com
- As of 17 December, 2016

Jayakumar Jayavardhan (born 29 May 1987) known as J. Jayavardhan is an Indian politician and was a Member of Parliament elected from Tamil Nadu. He was elected to the Lok Sabha from Chennai South constituency as an All India Anna Dravida Munnetra Kazhagam candidate in 2014 election. He completed his undergraduate studies at Sri Ramachandra Medical College and Research Institute and is a doctor by profession. Dr J Jayavardhan has become the youngest MP in India by winning the seat from South Chennai, Tamil Nadu at the young age of 26.

His father D. Jayakumar is a former MLA in Royapuram constituency Chennai and Former minister of fisheries in ADMK government and was also Speaker of the Tamil Nadu Assembly for a year (2011 – 2012), besides being the minister for fisheries in the first J. Jayalalithaa government of 1991–1996.

== Elections contested ==
=== Lok Sabha Elections ===
Elections	Constituency	Party	Result	Vote percentage	Opposition candidate	Opposition party	Opposition vote percentage
2014 Indian general election	Chennai South	AIADMK	Won	41.34	T. K. S. Elangovan	DMK	28.44
2019 Indian general election	Chennai South	AIADMK	Lost	26.94	Thamizhachi Thangapandian	DMK	50.28
2024 Indian general election	Chennai South	AIADMK	Lost	26.44	Thamizhachi Thangapandian	DMK	47.02
