= Jayarama Reddiar =

Indian politician

Member of the Madras State Assembly
- In office 1952–1957
- Preceded by: M. D. Ramaswami
- Constituency: Aruppukottai

Personal details
- Party: Indian National Congress

Jayarama Reddiar was an Indian politician and former Member of the Legislative Assembly of Tamil Nadu. He was elected to the Tamil Nadu legislative assembly as an Indian National Congress candidate from Aruppukottai constituency in 1952 election.

K. Kamaraj became the Chief Minister of Tamil Nadu after defeating him in Sattur constituency in 1957 election.

== Electoral performance ==
Election	Constituency	Political party	Result	Vote %	Opposition			Ref
Election	Constituency	Political party	Result	Vote %	Candidate	Political party	Vote %	Ref
1952	Aruppukottai	INC	Won	48.27%	M. D. Ramasami	Independent	42.42%	
1957	Sattur	Independent	Lost	46.54%	K. Kamaraj	INC	53.46%	
