= Su. Thirunavukkarasar =

Indian politician

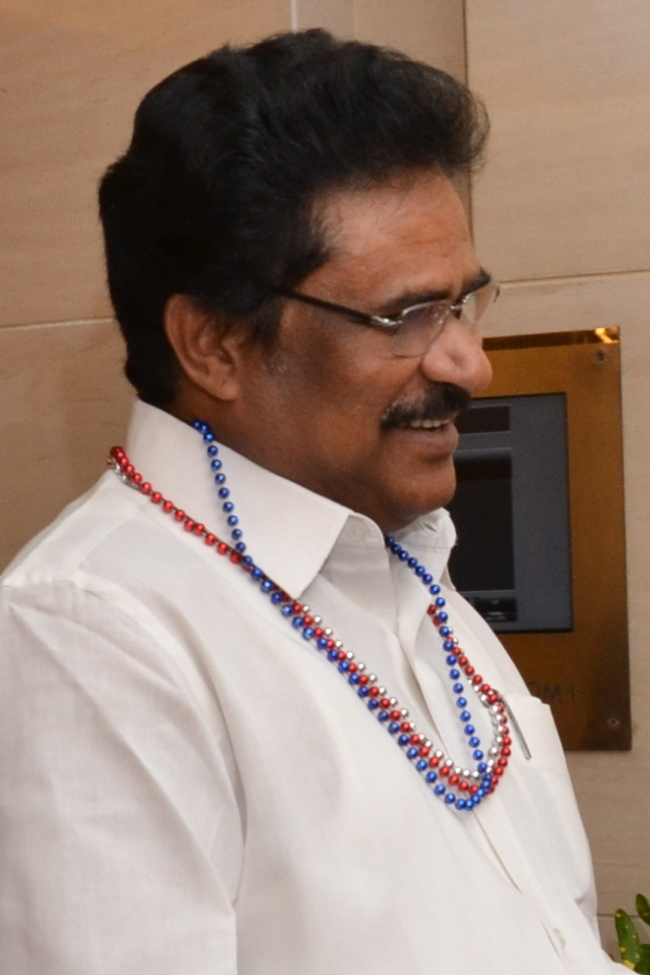
- Su. Thirunavukkarasar in 2012

Member of Parliament, Lok Sabha
- In office 23 May 2019 – 4 June 2024
- Preceded by: P Kumar
- Succeeded by: Durai Vaiko
- Constituency: Tiruchirappalli
- In office 6 October 1999 – 16 May 2004
- Preceded by: Raja Paramasivam
- Succeeded by: S. Regupathy
- Constituency: Pudukottai

Member of Parliament, Rajya Sabha
- In office 30 June 2004 – 26 June 2010
- Constituency: Madhya Pradesh

President of Tamil Nadu Congress Committee
- In office 14 September 2016 – 2 February 2019
- Preceded by: E. V. K. S. Elangovan
- Succeeded by: K. S. Alagiri

Minister of State for Shipping
- In office 1 July 2002 – 29 January 2003
- Prime Minister: Atal Bihari Vajpayee
- Preceded by: Shripad Naik
- Succeeded by: Dilipkumar Gandhi

Minister of State for Telecommunication and Information Technology
- In office 29 January 2003 – 22 May 2004
- Prime Minister: Atal Bihari Vajpayee
- Preceded by: Kumar Paswan
- Succeeded by: Ashok Kumar Pradhan

Minister of Industries, Housing Board, Excise and Handlooms
- In office 9 June 1980 – 24 December 1987
- Chief Minister: M. G. Ramachandran

Deputy Speaker, Tamilnadu Legislative Assembly
- In office 6 July 1977 – 18 June 1980
- Speaker: Munu Adhi
- Preceded by: N. Ganapathy
- Succeeded by: P. H. Pandian

Member of Tamil Nadu Legislative Assembly
- In office 30 June 1977 – 6 October 1999
- Preceded by: S. Ramanathan
- Succeeded by: C. Anbarasan
- Constituency: Aranthangi

Personal details
- Born: 13 July 1949 (age 77) Aranthangi, Madras Province, India
- Party: Indian National Congress (Since 2009)
- Other political affiliations: Bharatiya Janata Party (2002–2009); MGR Anna Dravida Munnetra Kazhagam (merged with BJP) (1996–2002); Anna Puratchi Thalaivar Thamilga Munnetra Kazhagam(1991–1996); All India Anna Dravida Munnetra Kazhagam (1977–1990),(1995–1996
- Children: S. T. Ramachandran,Anbarasan,Amrutha,Vishnu

Subburaman Thirunavukkarasar (born 13 July 1949) is an Indian politician. He was the State President of Tamil Nadu Congress Committee from 2016 to 2019 and former secretary of the All India Congress Committee (AICC) of the Indian National Congress (INC) party. His introduction to politics in 1977 was facilitated by former Chief Minister of Tamil Nadu, M. G. Ramachandran. Ramachandran founded the All India Anna Dravida Munnetra Kazhagam (AIADMK) in 1972 and was facing his first elections for the Tamil Nadu Legislative Assembly election in 1977. He identified Thirunavukkarasar, a lawyer by profession, to contest the Aranthangi assembly constituency. Thirunavukkarasar won the seat, aged 27, and was elected as the Deputy Speaker of the Tamil Nadu Legislative Assembly. He continued in that capacity till 1980. Subsequently, he served as Tamil Nadu state minister from 1980 to 1987 in the MGR cabinet, holding portfolios that included Industries, Housing Board, Excise and Handlooms. Later, he became a member of the Lok Sabha – the lower house of the Parliament of India – when he won the erstwhile Pudukottai Lok Sabha constituency. He served as Union Minister of state for shipping and later for telecommunications and information technology.

Thirunavukkarasar joined the Bharatiya Janata Party (BJP) for a brief period and was also a member of the Rajya Sabha – the upper house of the Parliament of India – from the state of Madhya Pradesh. He is a Member of Parliament, representing Tiruchirappalli constituency in the Lok Sabha (the lower house of India's Parliament).

== Early life ==
S. Thirunavukkarasar was born in Theeyathoor, Pudukkottai district, Tamil Nadu on 13 July 1949. He did his M.A., B.L. at Madras University, Chennai and Venkateshwara University, Tirupathi.

== Career ==
Thirunavukkarasar was elected from Aranthangi legislative assembly constituency at each election from 1977 to 1996. He resigned his seat on 15 October 1999, he started Anna Puratchi Thalaivar Thamilga Munnetra Kazhagam with K. K. S. S. R. Ramachandran in 1991 which made alliance with T. Rajendar's Thayaga Marlumarchi Kazhagam won 2 seats under that party symbol. But, it merged with AIADMK in 1996.

Flag of MADMK

He later started a new party called MGR Anna Dravida Munnetra Kazhagam in 1996 due to a rift with Jayalalitha, in the legislative assembly elections in Tamil Nadu 2001 MGR ADMK had put up three candidates (supported by NDA), out of whom two were elected. The party received 129 474 votes and in 2002 MGR ADMK merged with the Bharatiya Janata Party (BJP).He won the Pudukottai Lok Sabha Constituency in 1999 and was Union minister of state for Shipping and later, Communication and Information Technology till 2004.

He was appointed the secretary of the AICC by the INC president, Sonia Gandhi. Currently, as AICC secretary, he is responsible for Telangana and participated in the selection of Jana Reddy as leader of the opposition. Thirunavukkarasar was invited to inaugurate the Tamil Nadu chapter of Indian National Congress Overseas in New York, US.

== Achievements as State Minister (Tamil Nadu) ==
Thirunavukkarasar was the Industries, Handlooms and Commercial tax minister in the Ramachandran cabinet while simultaneously being the deputy speaker of the assembly. He established Tamil Nadu Magnesite Limited (TANMAG) and Tamil Nadu Minerals Limited (TAMIN) to further exploration of mineral resources in the state. Thirunavukkarasar also established several State Industries Promotion Corporation of Tamil Nadu (SIPCOTs). Several paper and sugar mills were established by Thirunavukkarasar.

Believing in human resource development through education, he established schools, arts and science college and polytechnics in the 1980s. He also built small dams in rivers and started hospitals and primary health centers. These were done while there was hardly any awareness about water storage and health care.

== Minister in the Government of India ==
As shipping minister, Thirunavukkarasar considered maritime education as necessary for the shipping industry. He emphasised the importance of technology and scientific training and encouraged the National Institute of Port Management to train more personnel. He also inaugurated new premises for Academy of Maritime Education and Training (AMET).

== Congress relationship ==
When Sonia Gandhi took over the presidency of Congress Party in 1998. In the 1998 Lok Sabha elections, MGRADMK founded by Thirunavukkarasar aligned with the Congress to face the polls.

Thirunavukkarasar contested the Ramanathapuram Lok Sabha constituency when several Congress stalwarts refused to contest the election. Recently in the year 2017 he was appointed the State President of the Tamil Nadu Congress Committee and has in the past served as the secretary of the All India Congress Committee from 2010 to 2017.

== Electoral career ==
=== Tamil Nadu Legislative Assembly Elections Contested ===
Elections	Constituency	Party	Result	Vote percentage	Opposition Candidate	Opposition Party	Opposition vote percentage
1977	Arantangi	AIADMK	Won	37.45	P. Appukutty	CPI	25.90
1980	Arantangi	AIADMK	Won	49.50	Mohamed Mashood. M	Independent	35.59
1984	Arantangi	AIADMK	Won	49.50	Ramanathan. S	DMK	35.94
1989	Arantangi	AIADMK(J)	Won	47.58	Shanmugasundaram M	DMK	30.85
1991	Arantangi	TMK	Won	56.46	Shanmugasundaram M	AIADMK	40.02
1996	Arantangi	MADMK	Won	50.10	Shanmugasundaram M	DMK	39.95

=== Lok Sabha Elections Contested ===
Year	Constituency	Party	Votes	%	Opponent	Opponent Party	Opponent Votes	%	Result	Margin	%
2019	Tiruchirappalli	INC	621,285	59.7	Dr. V. Elangovan	DMDK	161,999	15.57	Won	459,286	44.13
2014	Ramanathapuram	INC	62,160	6.25	A. Anwhar Raajhaa	AIADMK	405,945	40.81	Lost	-343,785	-34.56
2009	Ramanathapuram	BJP	128,322	16.55	J. K. Rithesh	DMK	294,945	38.03	Lost	-166,623	-21.48
1999	Pudukkottai	MADMK	396,216	50.7	S. Singaaravadivel	INC	331,914	42.5	Won	64,302	8.2
1998	Pudukkottai	MADMK	226,416	28.6	Paramasivam Raja	AIADMK	288,072	36.4	Lost	-61,656	-7.8

=== Rajya Sabha Elections Contested ===
Year	Election	Party	PC Name	Result	l	2004	2004	Madhya Pradesh	Won

== Film career ==
Thirunavukkarasar briefly worked as film distributor. He scripted and produced the film Maruthu Pandi (1990) and appeared in lead role in Agni Paarvai (1992).

- Maruthu Pandi (1990)
- Agni Paarvai (1992)

== Personal life ==
Su. Thirunavukkarasar married Jayanthi in 1978. They have three sons and two daughters.
