= A. Durai Arasan =

Indian politician (1922-1998)

A.Duraiarasan
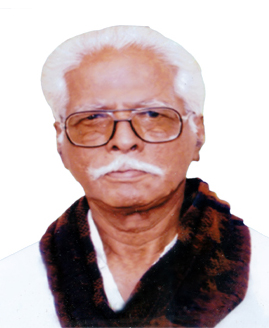
- Duraiarasan

Personal details
- Born: 22 October 1922 Palaiyavanam, Pudukkottai District, Madras Presidency, British India
- Died: 10 April 1998 (aged 75)
- Spouse(s): Late.Smt.Jagathanbal; Late.Smt.Dharbambal
- Children: Durai. Thamarai Chelvam, Join Director (Rtd), Information and Public Relations Department, Government of Tamil Nadu

A. Durai Arasan (22 October 1922 – 10 April 1998) was an Indian politician and former Member of the Legislative Assembly of Tamil Nadu. He was elected to the Tamil Nadu legislative assembly as a Dravida Munnetra Kazhagam candidate from Arantangi constituency in 1962, and 1967 elections.

== Early life ==
Durai Arasan was born in 1922 as a last son of Palaiyavanam Zamin family at Palaiyavanam (Pudukkottai District), Tamil Nadu, to Sir Vijaya Arunachala Vanagamudi Pandarathar in Hindu religion in Kallar community. His father was a crowned Zamindar of Palaiyavanam who was one among the very few Zaminsdars praised by the public. He had two elder brothers and two sister. He married Dharmmambal and the couple had a son named Thamarai Chelvam. He attended gurukulam and latter schooling at local village school. After independence when Zamindari Abolition Acts was enforced he moved from his village to the nearby town Aranthangi in 1950 and settled there.

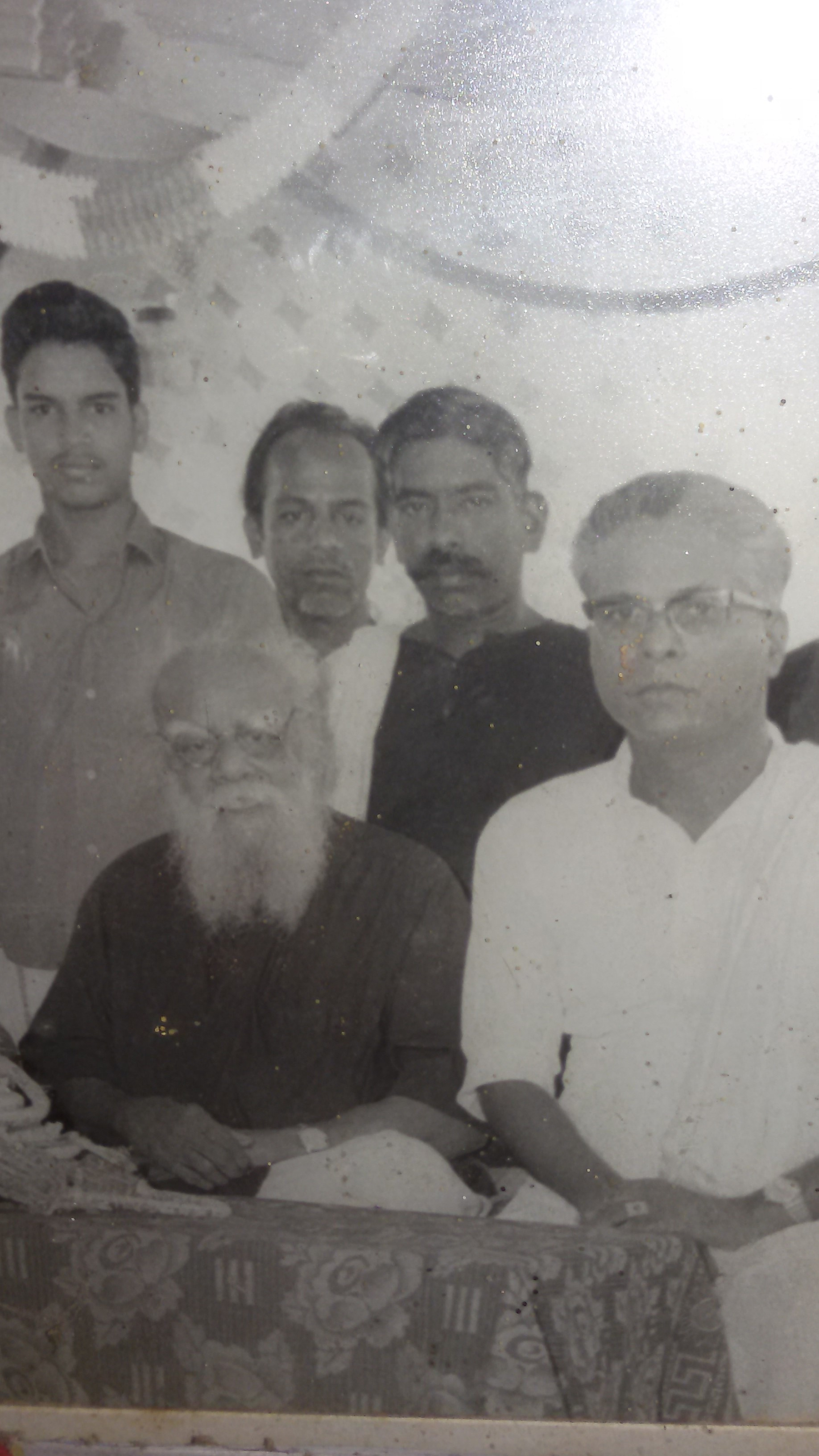
From Left to Right Durai. Thamarai Chelvam, Duraikannu (standing) Thanthai Periyar, Duraiarasan (sitting)

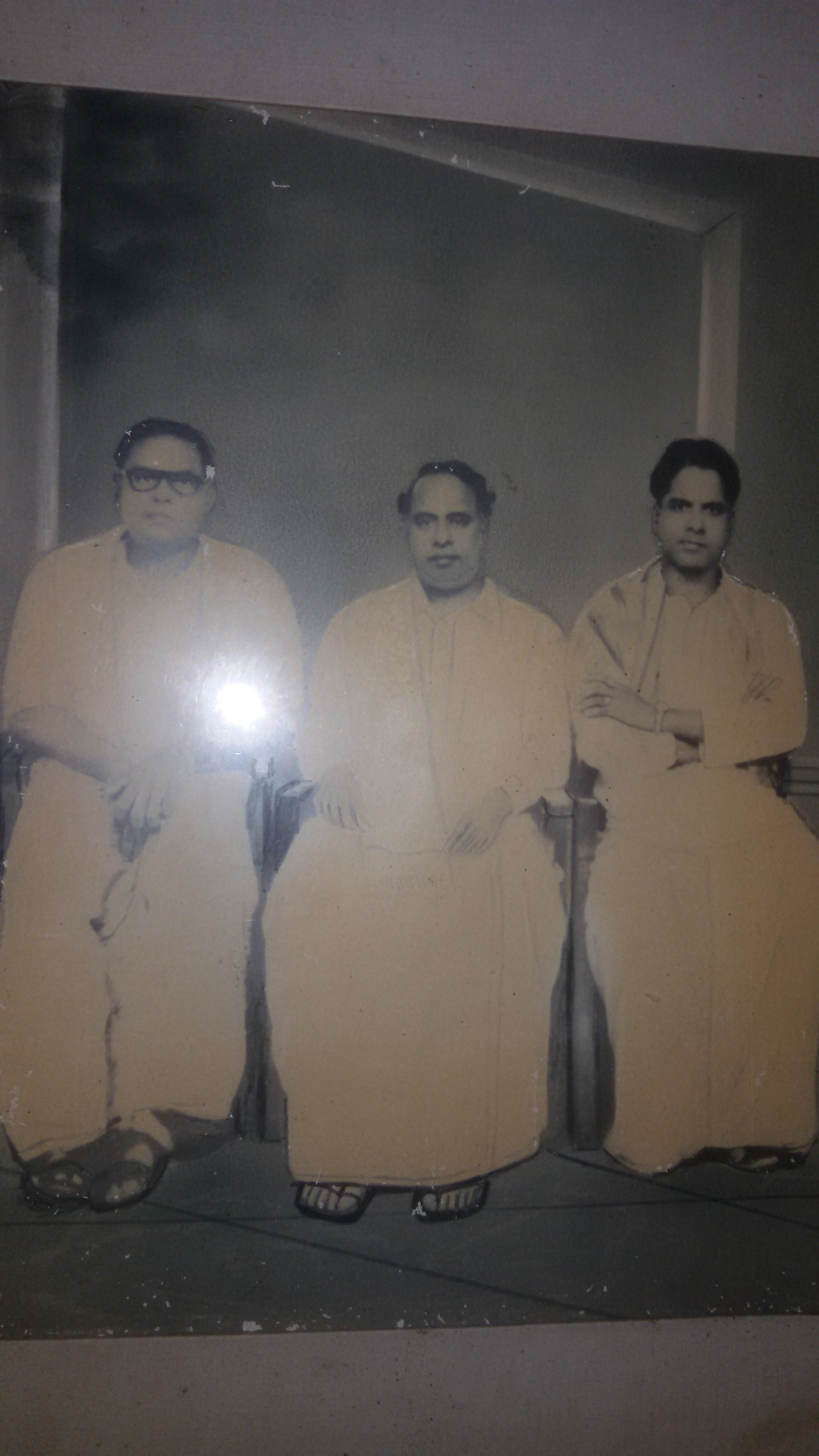
From Left to Right - Mannai Narayanasamy, C.N. Annadurai, A. Duraiarasan

== Entry into politics ==
Duraiarsan a Zamindar by birth had lot of properties. When he came out of the Zamin culture he started observing the ordinary public and realized how much struggle the normal people undergo to meet out their day today life. He realized the meaning of life and decided to serve the poor people to come up in society as like the richer group. He was attracted by Thanthai Periyar and became his follower by joining Dravidar Kazhagam (DK known as Justice Party till 1944). During those days congress was the dominating political party which was normally headed by richer group (Zamindars and land lords). He spent most of his property and wealth in growing Dravidar Kazhagam.

== Achievements as a Legislative member of Aranthangi ==
Aranthangi was considered to be one of the backward locations of south Tamil Nadu because of low rainfall. Hence after Independence there was no significant growth was there in the region even to meet out the basic needs of the people. In such situation he brought lot of developments to this constituency, hence his period was considered as a "Golden Era" in the history of Aranthangi. His achievements includes the following

1. Bus stand was constructed for Aranthangi Town on 22 November 1971, 2. Government General Hospital to meet out basic medical needs for the surroundings in Aranthangi Town, 3. Spinning Mill to meet out unemployment, 4. Several other basic facilities such as roads, buses, electricity, drinking water facilities were brought to most of the places including the coastal areas

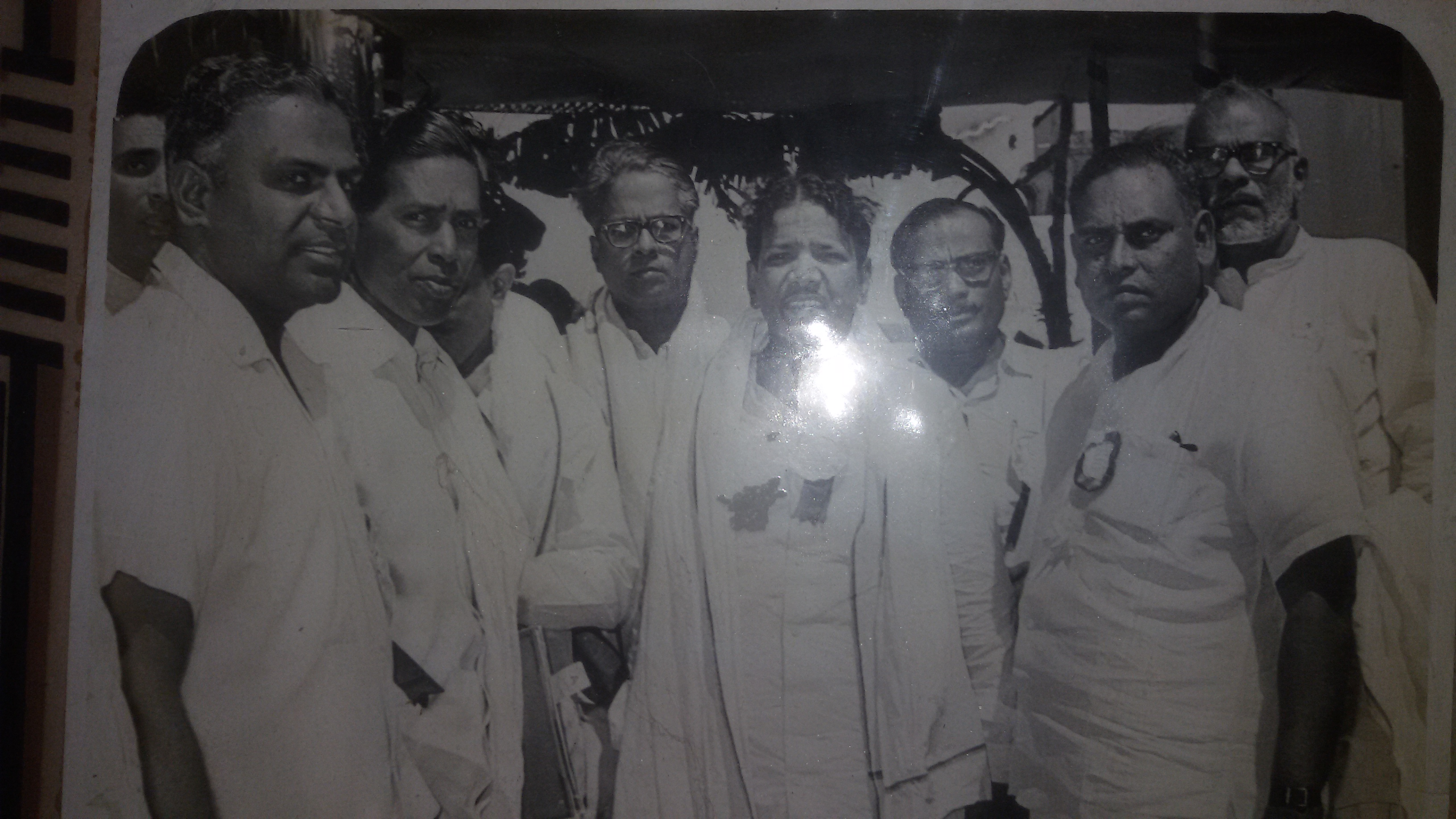
with Kalaigar, Mannai and Adhithanar.jpg

== Personal achievements ==
He has donated lot of his own land to the poorer segments and one of the biggest donations is to the people of Duraiarasapuram (His name was kept to the village by the public) is a standing example for his philanthropy.

== Electoral performance ==
Election	Constituency	Political party	Result	Vote %	Opposition			Ref
Election	Constituency	Political party	Result	Vote %	Candidate	Political party	Vote %	Ref
1962	Aranthangi	DMK	Won	55.25%	K. Ramanathan Servai	INC	41.07%	
1967	Aranthangi	DMK	Won	53.11%	K. B. Dervaikarar	INC	45.17%	
