= Udayam Shanmugam =

Indian politician

Udayam Shanmugham was elected to the Tamil Nadu Legislative Assembly from the Aranthangi constituency in the 2006 elections. He was a candidate of the Dravida Munnetra Kazhagam (DMK) party. In 2025 a video of him brandishing a weapon at a worker during a foundation laying ceremony went viral.

== Electoral performance ==
Election	Constituency	Political party	Result	Vote %	Opposition			Ref
Election	Constituency	Political party	Result	Vote %	Candidate	Political party	Vote %	Ref
2006	Aranthangi	DMK	Won	43.86%	Y. Karthikeyan	AIADMK	31.77%	
