= K. M. Vijayakumar =

Indian politician

K. M. Vijayakumar is an Indian politician and was a Member of the Legislative Assembly. He was elected to the Tamil Nadu Legislative Assembly as a Dravida Munnetra Kazhagam (DMK) candidate from Sattur constituency in the 1996 election.
