= Chennai South Lok Sabha constituency =

Parliamentary constituency in Tamil Nadu, India

Coordinates: 12.87°N 80.19°E

Chennai South
- Lok Sabha constituency
- Interactive map of Chennai South Loksabha constituency, post-2008 delimitation

Constituency details
- Country: India
- Region: South India
- State: Tamil Nadu
- Assembly constituencies: Virugampakkam; Saidapet; Thiyagarayanagar; Mylapore; Velachery; Shozhinganallur
- Established: 1957–present
- Total electors: 21,83,315
- Reservation: None

Member of Parliament
- 18th Lok Sabha
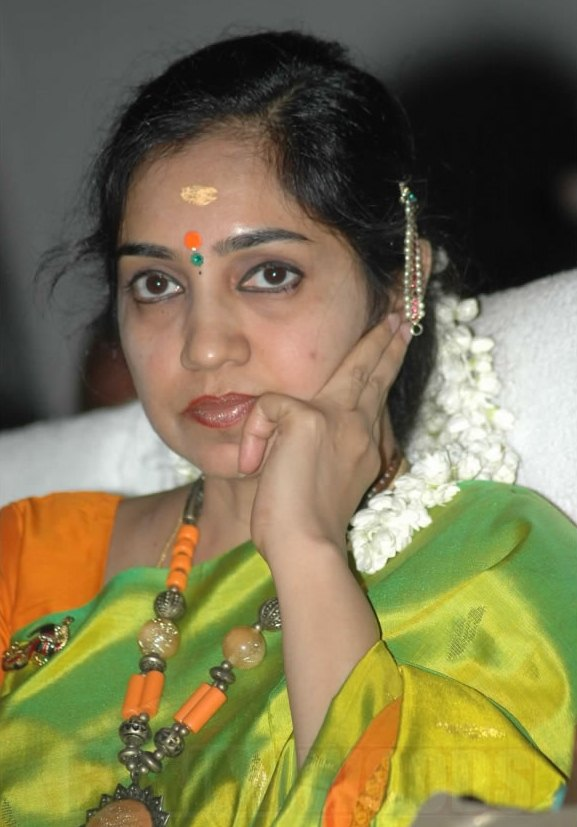
- Incumbent Thamizhachi Thangapandian
- Party: DMK
- Alliance: None
- Elected year: 2024 Lok Sabha election

The Lok Sabha constituency Chennai South is one of three constituencies in Chennai, Tamil Nadu. Its Tamil Nadu Parliamentary Constituency number is 3 of 39. It was formerly known as Madras South. It was created in 1957 through bifurcation of Madras Lok Sabha constituency. It is one of the most populous parliamentary constituencies in South India.

== Assembly segments ==
=== After 2009 ===
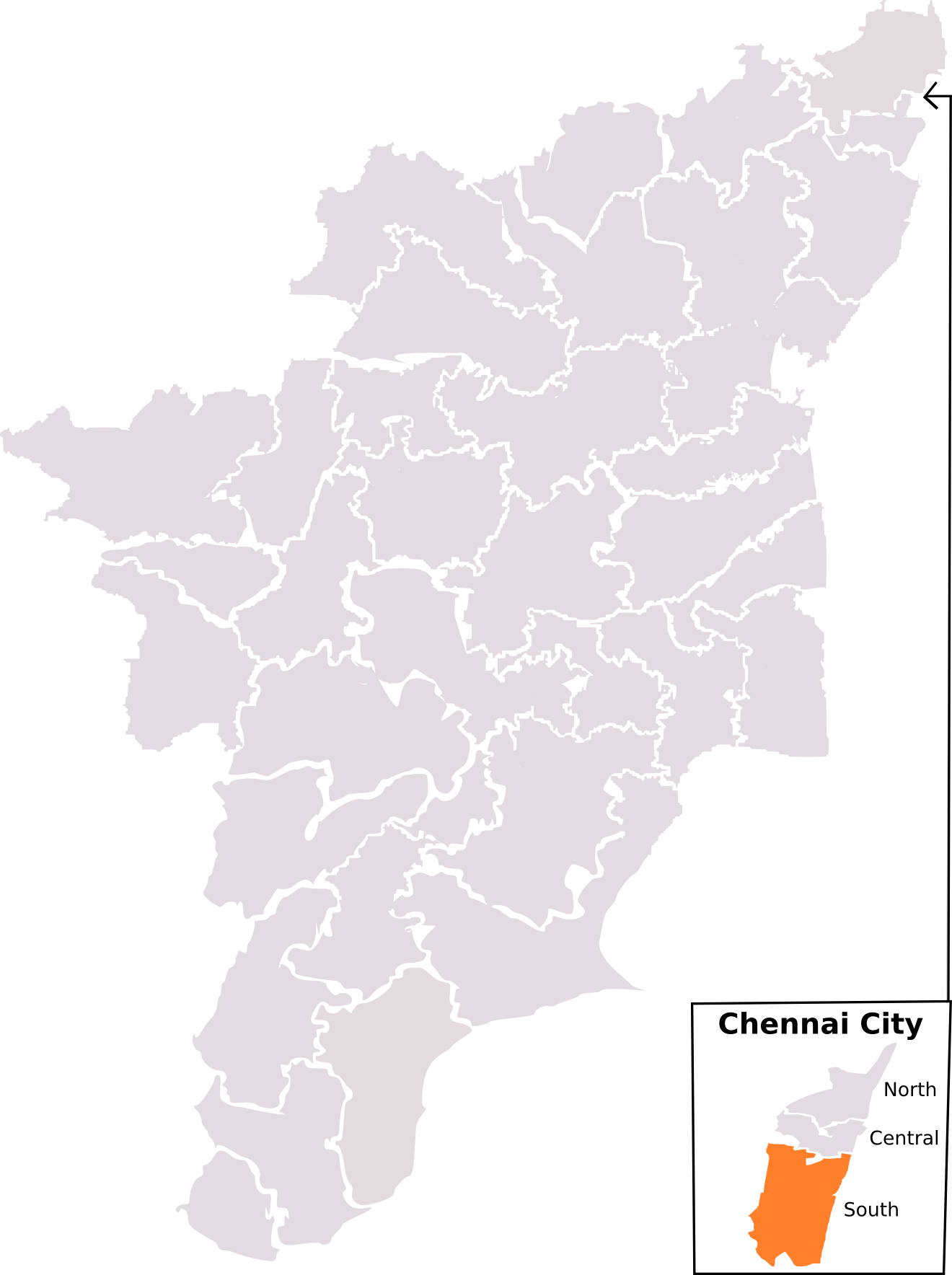
Chennai South constituency as laid out by 2008 delimitation

After delimitation, Chennai South consists of following constituencies

Constituency number	Name	Reserved for (SC/ST/None)	District	Party	2024 Lead
22	Virugampakkam	None	Chennai	TVK	DMK
23	Saidapet	None	Chennai	TVK	DMK
24	Thiyagarayanagar	None	Chennai	TVK	DMK
25	Mylapore	None	Chennai	TVK	DMK
26	Velachery	None	Chennai	TVK	DMK
27	Shozhinganallur	None	Chennai	TVK	DMK

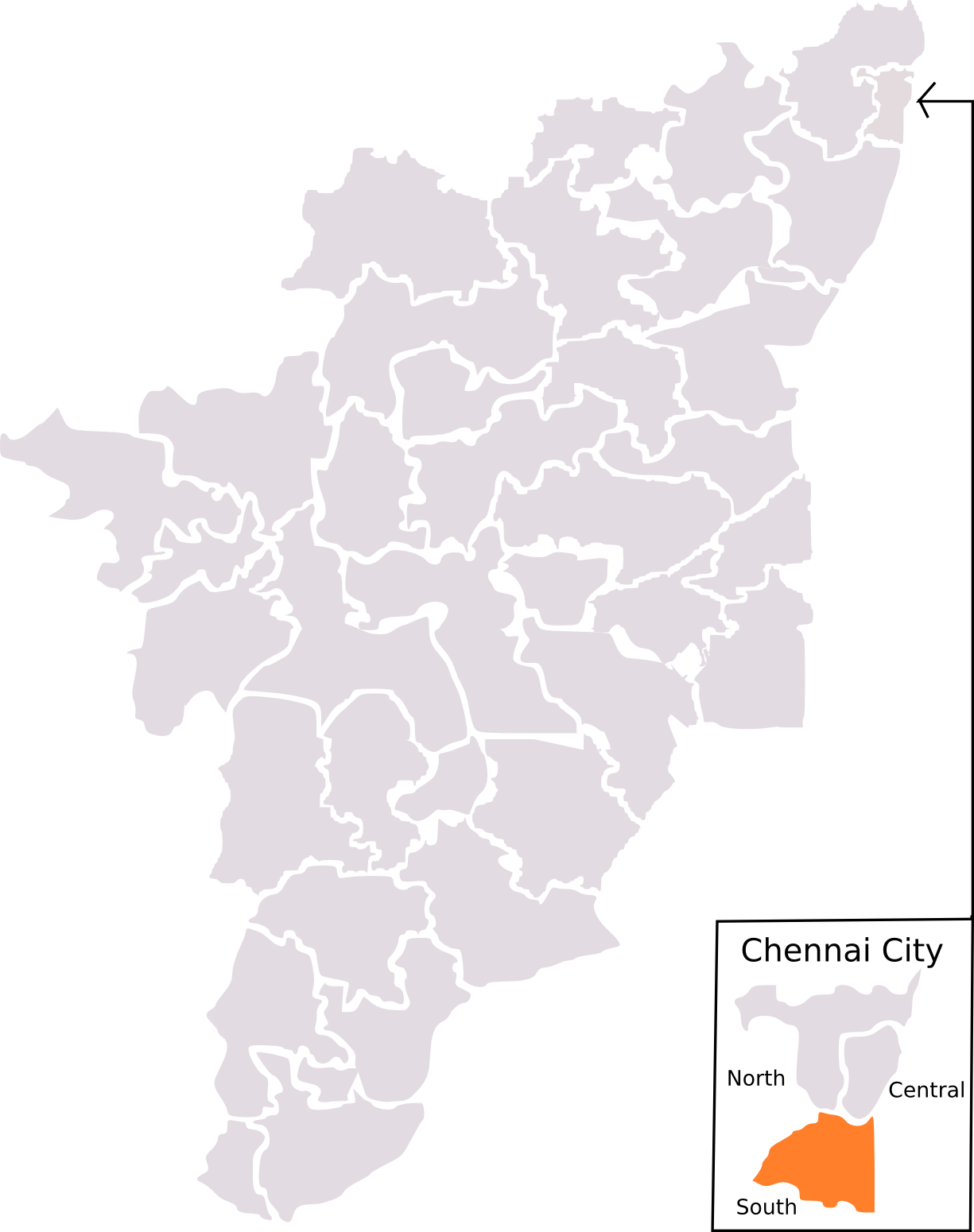
Chennai South constituency as laid out by 1971 Delimitation. The boundaries for this constituency lasted until 2004 election, which was then replaced by 2008 Delimitation.

=== Before 2009 ===
Chennai South Lok Sabha constituency is composed of the following assembly segments:

1. Triplicane (defunct)
2. Mylapore
3. Saidapet
4. Alandur (moved to Sriperumpudhur)
5. Tambaram (moved to Sriperumpudhur)
6. Thiyagarayanagar

== Members of the Parliament ==
Year	Winner	Party
1952	T. T. Krishnamachari	Indian National Congress
1957	T. T. Krishnamachari	Indian National Congress
1962	Nanjil K. Manoharan	Dravida Munnetra Kazhagam
1967	C. N. Annadurai	Dravida Munnetra Kazhagam
1967^	Murasoli Maran	Dravida Munnetra Kazhagam
1971	Murasoli Maran	Dravida Munnetra Kazhagam
1977	R. Venkataraman	Indian National Congress
1980	R. Venkataraman	Indian National Congress
1984	Vyjayanthimala	Indian National Congress
1989	Vyjayanthimala	Indian National Congress
1991	R. Sridharan	All India Anna Dravida Munnetra Kazhagam
1996	T. R. Baalu	Dravida Munnetra Kazhagam
1998	T. R. Baalu	Dravida Munnetra Kazhagam
1999	T. R. Baalu	Dravida Munnetra Kazhagam
2004	T. R. Baalu	Dravida Munnetra Kazhagam
2009	C. Rajendran	All India Anna Dravida Munnetra Kazhagam
2014	J. Jayavardhan	All India Anna Dravida Munnetra Kazhagam
2019	Thamizhachi Thangapandian	Dravida Munnetra Kazhagam
2024	Thamizhachi Thangapandian	Dravida Munnetra Kazhagam

== Election results ==
Vote share of Winning candidates
2024	47.09%
2019	50.28%
2014	41.34%
2009	42.38%
2004	60.41%
1999	60.03%
1998	48.17%
1996	61.97%
1991	56.66%
1989	53.91%
1984	51.92%
1980	60.34%
1977	50.79%
1971	52.09%
By-Election 1967	%
1967	59.38%
1962	44.73%
1957	45.93%
1951	40.66%

=== General Elections 2024 ===
2024 Indian general election: Chennai South
Party	Candidate	Votes	%	±%
DMK	Thamizhachi Thangapandian	516,628	47.00	▼3.28
BJP	Tamilisai Soundararajan	290,683	26.44	New
AIADMK	J. Jayavardhan	172,491	15.69	▼11.25
NOTA	None of the above	15,653	1.42	▼0.08
Margin of victory		225,945	20.55	▼2.19
Turnout		11,00,005	54.36	▼2.46
Registered electors		20,23,133		
DMK hold		Swing		

=== General Elections 2019 ===
2019 Indian general election: Chennai South
Party	Candidate	Votes	%	±%
DMK	Thamizhachi Thangapandian	564,872	50.28	+21.84
AIADMK	Dr. J. Jayavardhan	3,02,649	26.94	−14.40
MNM	R. Rangarajan	1,35,465	12.06	
Independent	Dr. E. Subaya (A) Esakki Subaya	29,522	2.63	
NOTA	None Of The Above	16,891	1.50	−0.42
Margin of victory		2,62,223	23.34	+10.44
Turnout		11,23,410	56.92	−1.61
Registered electors		19,73,533		9.90
DMK gain from AIADMK		Swing	8.94	

=== General Elections 2014 ===
2014 Indian general election: Chennai South
Party	Candidate	Votes	%	±%
AIADMK	Dr. J. Jayavardhan	434,540	41.34	−1.04
DMK	T. K. S. Elangovan	2,98,965	28.44	−9.42
BJP	La. Ganesan	2,58,262	24.57	18.67
INC	S. V. Ramani	24,276	2.31	
NOTA	None Of The Above	20,229	1.92	
AAP	V. S. Chandirakumar	17,208	1.64	
Margin of victory		1,35,575	12.90	8.37
Turnout		10,51,180	58.54	−4.12
Registered electors		17,95,776		54.53
AIADMK hold		Swing	-1.04	

=== General Elections 2009 ===
2009 Indian general election: Chennai South
Party	Candidate	Votes	%	±%
AIADMK	C. Rajendran	308,567	42.38	5.59
DMK	R. S. Bharathi	2,75,632	37.86	−22.56
DMDK	V. Gopinath	67,291	9.24	
BJP	La. Ganesan	42,925	5.90	
Independent	E. Sarath Babu	15,885	2.18	
Margin of victory		32,935	4.52	−19.10
Turnout		11,62,062	62.66	14.73
Rejected ballots		16	0.00	
Registered electors		7,28,092		−40.40
AIADMK gain from DMK		Swing	-18.03	

=== General Elections 2004 ===
2004 Indian general election: Chennai South
Party	Candidate	Votes	%	±%
DMK	T. R. Baalu	564,578	60.41	0.38
AIADMK	Bader Sayeed	3,43,838	36.79	
Margin of victory		2,20,740	23.62	−2.03
Turnout		9,34,548	47.93	2.77
Rejected ballots		29	0.00	
Registered electors		19,49,904		−5.99
DMK hold		Swing	0.38	

=== General Elections 1999 ===
1999 Indian general election: Chennai South
Party	Candidate	Votes	%	±%
DMK	T. R. Baalu	562,221	60.03	−1.93
INC	V. Dhandayuthapani	3,22,037	34.39	
TMC(M)	Muktha V. Srinivasan	38,700	4.13	
Independent	M. Raja	4,309	0.46	
Margin of victory		2,40,184	25.65	−13.37
Turnout		9,36,522	45.15	−11.13
Registered electors		20,74,130		7.09
DMK hold		Swing	-1.93	

=== General Elections 1998 ===
1998 Indian general election: Chennai South
Party	Candidate	Votes	%	±%
DMK	T. R. Baalu	432,913	48.17	
BJP	Jana Krishnamurthi	4,12,899	45.94	
INC	M. P. Subramanyam	44,549	4.96	
Margin of victory		20,014	2.23	−36.79
Turnout		8,98,798	47.35	−8.94
Registered electors		19,36,771		23.14
DMK hold		Swing	-13.80	

=== General Elections 1996 ===
1996 Indian general election: Chennai South
Party	Candidate	Votes	%	±%
DMK	T. R. Baalu	538,697	61.97	27.31
AIADMK	H. Ganesham	1,99,516	22.95	−33.71
Independent	Asha Menon @ Revathi	42,906	4.94	
BJP	V. Maitreyan	34,356	3.95	−0.04
MDMK	R. Senguttuvan	29,838	3.43	
PMK	K. V. Sivaraman	13,540	1.56	
Margin of victory		3,39,181	39.02	17.01
Turnout		8,69,334	56.28	3.10
Registered electors		15,72,764		11.50
DMK gain from AIADMK		Swing	5.30	

=== General Elections 1991 ===
1991 Indian general election: Chennai South
Party	Candidate	Votes	%	±%
AIADMK	R. Sridharan	418,493	56.66	
DMK	T. R. Baalu	2,55,965	34.66	−4.04
BJP	R. S. Narayanaswami	29,480	3.99	
PMK	K. V. Sivaraman	19,840	2.69	
JP	H. V. Hande	7,662	1.04	
Margin of victory		1,62,528	22.01	6.79
Turnout		7,38,558	53.19	−6.53
Registered electors		14,10,540		0.91
AIADMK gain from INC		Swing	2.75	

=== General Elections 1989 ===
1989 Indian general election: Chennai South
Party	Candidate	Votes	%	±%
INC	Vyjayanthimala	445,864	53.91	1.99
DMK	Aladi Aruna	3,20,020	38.70	
Independent	Ayilam Panchapakesa Venkateswaran	24,967	3.02	
PMK	V. Sivaraman Alias Saidai K. V. Siva	22,234	2.69	
Margin of victory		1,25,844	15.22	7.80
Turnout		8,27,014	59.72	−6.12
Registered electors		13,97,773		37.20
INC hold		Swing	1.99	

=== General Elections 1984 ===
1984 Indian general election: Chennai South
Party	Candidate	Votes	%	±%
INC	Vyjayanthimala	336,353	51.92	
JP	Era Sezhiyan	2,88,336	44.51	
Independent	V. Kulothungacholan	3,173	0.49	
Independent	M. Madhavan	2,999	0.46	
Independent	Era Kulasekaran	2,908	0.45	
Margin of victory		48,017	7.41	−14.67
Turnout		6,47,851	65.84	−2.25
Registered electors		10,18,795		25.49
INC gain from INC(I)		Swing	-8.42	

=== General Elections 1980 ===
1980 Indian general election: Chennai South
Party	Candidate	Votes	%	±%
INC(I)	Ramaswamy Venkataraman	328,836	60.34	
AIADMK	E. V. K. Sulochana Sampath	2,08,474	38.25	
Margin of victory		1,20,362	22.09	18.96
Turnout		5,44,980	68.09	9.37
Registered electors		8,11,849		−0.86
INC(I) gain from INC		Swing	9.55	

=== General Elections 1977 ===
1977 Indian general election: Chennai South
Party	Candidate	Votes	%	±%
INC	Ramaswamy Venkataraman	241,033	50.79	
DMK	Murasoli Maran	2,26,204	47.66	−4.42
Independent	S. Srinivasan	2,676	0.56	
Margin of victory		14,829	3.12	−1.05
Turnout		4,74,577	58.72	−8.60
Registered electors		8,18,878		10.41
INC gain from DMK		Swing	-1.30	

=== General Elections 1971 ===
1971 Indian general election: Chennai South
Party	Candidate	Votes	%	±%
DMK	Murasoli Maran	253,626	52.09	−7.30
SWA	Nara Simhan	2,33,285	47.91	
Margin of victory		20,341	4.18	−15.44
Turnout		4,86,911	67.32	−6.29
Registered electors		7,41,660		28.98
DMK hold		Swing	-7.30	

=== General Elections 1967 ===
1967 Indian general election: Chennai South
Party	Candidate	Votes	%	±%
DMK	C. N. Annadurai	248,099	59.38	14.65
INC	K. Gurumurti	1,66,121	39.76	13.33
ABJS	R. M. A. Chettiar	2,601	0.62	
Margin of victory		81,978	19.62	1.32
Turnout		4,17,783	73.60	2.00
Registered electors		5,75,015		18.14
DMK hold		Swing	14.65	

=== General Elections 1962 ===
1962 Indian general election: Chennai South
Party	Candidate	Votes	%	±%
DMK	Nanjil K. Manoharan	151,917	44.73	
INC	C. R. Ramaswamy	89,771	26.43	−19.50
TNP	E. V. K. Sampath	63,768	18.78	
Independent	M. Ganapathy	34,169	10.06	
Margin of victory		62,146	18.30	12.59
Turnout		3,39,625	71.61	34.07
Registered electors		4,86,728		3.12
DMK gain from INC		Swing	-1.20	

=== General Elections 1957 ===
1957 Indian general election: Chennai South
Party	Candidate	Votes	%	±%
INC	T. T. Krishnamachari	81,390	45.93	5.28
Independent	P. Balasubramania Mudaliar	71,284	40.23	
Independent	H. D. Rajah	24,516	13.84	
Margin of victory		10,106	5.70	−2.58
Turnout		1,77,190	37.54	−15.36
Registered electors		4,72,017		27.81
INC hold		Swing	5.28	

=== General Elections 1951 ===
1951–52 Indian general election: Chennai South
Party	Candidate	Votes	%	±%
INC	T. T. Krishnamachari	79,431	40.66	40.66
Justice Party	Dr. Balasubramanyam	63,254	32.38	
SP	Srinivasa Ramanujan	16,835	8.62	
Independent	Krishna Pillai	10,555	5.40	
All India Republican Party	Ramanathan	9,535	4.88	
KMPP	Achar	7,252	3.71	
Independent	Ramanathan Chettiar	5,953	3.05	
HM	Srinivasa Iyer	2,555	1.31	
Margin of victory		16,177	8.28	
Turnout		1,95,370	52.90	
Registered electors		3,69,299		0.00
INC win (new seat)				

== See also ==
- South chennai Latest News
- Chennai
- List of constituencies of the Lok Sabha
