= Sowdi Sundara Bharathi =

Indian politician

Sowdi Sundara Bharathi was an Indian politician and former Member of the Legislative Assembly of Tamil Nadu. He was elected to the Tamil Nadu legislative assembly first as a Swatantra Party and then as Forward Bloc candidate from Aruppukottai constituency in 1967 and 1971 elections.

== Electoral performance ==
Election	Constituency	Political party	Result	Vote %	Opposition			Ref
Election	Constituency	Political party	Result	Vote %	Candidate	Political party	Vote %	Ref
1962	Aruppukottai	AIFB	Lost	43.80%	T. Kadambavana Sundaram	INC	54.54%	
1967	Aruppukottai	SWA	Won	54.68%	T. K. Sundarm	INC	40.04%	
1971	Aruppukottai	AIFB	Won	56.67%	M. Veerasamy	SWA	42.72%	
