= Aruppukottai Assembly constituency =

One of the 234 State Legislative Assembly Constituencies in Tamil Nadu, in India

Coordinates: 9.51°N 78.1°E

Aruppukottai
- Constituency No. 207 for the Tamil Nadu Legislative Assembly

Constituency details
- Country: India
- Region: South India
- State: Tamil Nadu
- Lok Sabha constituency: Virudhunagar
- Established: 1951
- Total electors: 207,750

Member of Legislative Assembly
- 17th Tamil Nadu Legislative Assembly
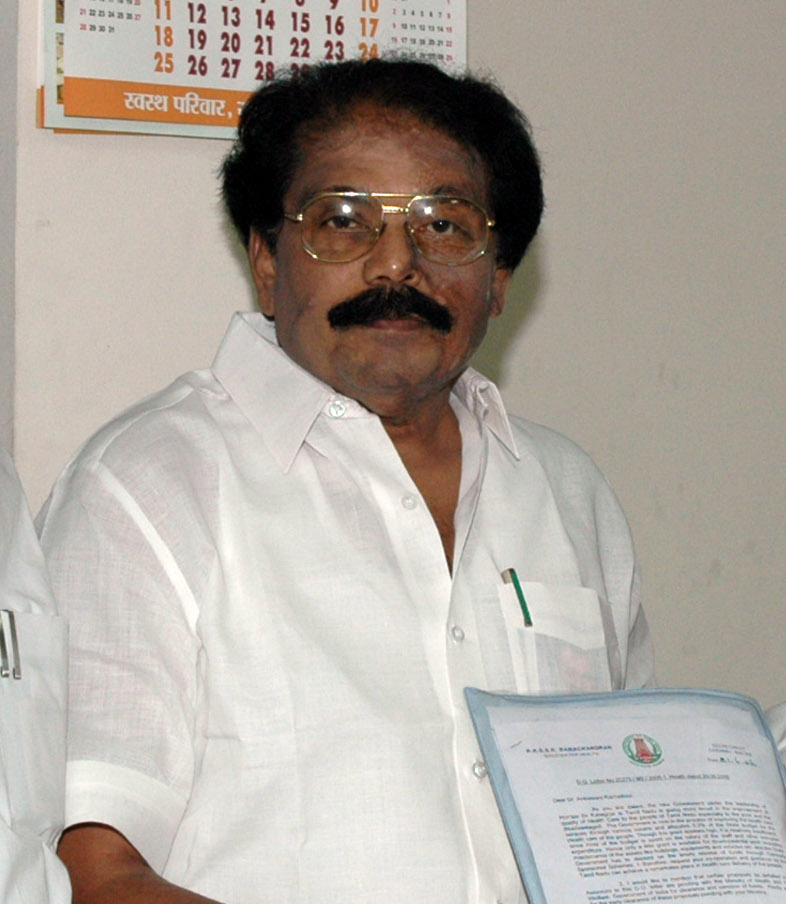
- Incumbent K. K. S. S. R. Ramachandran
- Party: DMK
- Elected year: 2026

Aruppukottai is a legislative assembly in Virudhunagar district, which includes the city, Aruppukkottai. It is a part of Virudhunagar Lok Sabha constituency. This is the constituency, held by popular actor-turned politician, M. G. Ramachandran, when he first became Chief Minister in the 1977 assembly elections. It is one of the 234 State Legislative Assembly Constituencies in Tamil Nadu, in India.

The Chettiyar (all kinds - mostly chettiyar) community is the biggest community in this constituency with around 23% population.

The population of other communities are: 15% Devendrakula Velalar, 8% Naidus,6% kambalthu nayakkar,14% Saliyar, 5% Nadar, 10% Mutharaiyar, Maravar 6%, Agamudaiyar 2%, 5% Reddy, 2% Konar, 2% Pillaimar and muslims 2%.

In the 2021 MLA election, the DMK party's Reddy candidate K. K. S. S. R. Ramachandran won, and became the minister of Revenue and Disaster Management.

== History ==
Until the 2006 election, Aruppukottai Assembly constituency was part of Ramanathapuram Lok Sabha constituency. Since the 2006 election, it has been part of Virudhunagar Lok Sabha constituency.

== Members of the Legislative Assembly ==
Election	Member	Party
1952	Jayarama Reddiar	Indian National Congress
1957	M. D. Ramasami	Independent politician
1962	T. K. Sundaram	Indian National Congress
1967	S. S. Bharathi	Swatantra Party
1971	Sowdi Sundara Bharathi	All India Forward Bloc
1977	M. G. Ramachandran	All India Anna Dravida Munnetra Kazhagam
1980	M. Pitchai	All India Anna Dravida Munnetra Kazhagam
1984	M. Pitchai	All India Anna Dravida Munnetra Kazhagam
1989	V. Thangapandian	Dravida Munnetra Kazhagam
1991	V. G. Manimeghalai	All India Anna Dravida Munnetra Kazhagam
1996	V. Thangapandian	Dravida Munnetra Kazhagam
1998^	Thangam Thenarasu	Dravida Munnetra Kazhagam
2001	K. K. Sivasamy	All India Anna Dravida Munnetra Kazhagam
2006	Thangam Thenarasu	Dravida Munnetra Kazhagam
2011	Vaigaichelvan	All India Anna Dravida Munnetra Kazhagam
2016	K. K. S. S. R. Ramachandran	Dravida Munnetra Kazhagam
2021	K. K. S. S. R. Ramachandran	Dravida Munnetra Kazhagam
2026	K. K. S. S. R. Ramachandran	Dravida Munnetra Kazhagam

Madras State

== Election results ==
Vote share of winning candidates
2026	36.49%
2021	53.18%
2016	49.41%
2011	51.15%
2006	44.88%
2001	46.07%
1996	43.70%
1991	58.91%
1989	45.59%
1984	45.32%
1980	53.67%
1977	56.23%
1971	56.67%
1967	54.68%
1962	54.54%
1957	55.13%
1952	48.27%

=== Assembly election 2026 ===
2026 Tamil Nadu Legislative Assembly election : Aruppukottai
Party	Candidate	Votes	%	±%
DMK	Sattur Ramachandran	65,104	36.49%	▼17.10
TVK	Karthik Kumar. K	60,161	33.72%	New
AIADMK	Sethupathy. S	37,190	20.84%	New
NTK	Manimaran. G	8,499	4.76%	▼2.53
PT	Ragupathi. K	2,179	1.22%	▲0.94
AIPTMMK	Dharmaraj. P	1,147	0.64%	New
NOTA	None of the above	692	0.39%	▼0.39
Margin of victory		4,943	2.77%	▼20.21
Turnout		178,698	85.84%	▲9.01
Total valid votes		178,413		
Registered electors		208,168		▼6.99
DMK hold		Swing		

=== Assembly election 2021 ===
2021 Tamil Nadu Legislative Assembly election : Aruppukottai
Party	Candidate	Votes	%	±%
DMK	Sattur Ramachandran	91,040	53.59%	▲4.18
AIADMK	Vaigaichelvan	52,006	30.61%	▼7.85
NTK	Uma	12,392	7.29%	▲6.44
MNM	V. Umadevi	7,638	4.50%	New
DMDK	R. Ramesh	2,532	1.49%	New
NOTA	None of the above	1,323	0.78%	▼0.74
Margin of victory		39,034	22.98%	▲12.03
Turnout		171,961	76.83%	▼2.47
Total valid votes		169,878		
Rejected ballots		208	0.12%	▼0.05
Registered electors		223,820		▲7.45
DMK hold		Swing		

=== Assembly election 2016 ===
2016 Tamil Nadu Legislative Assembly election : Aruppukottai
Party	Candidate	Votes	%	±%
DMK	Sattur Ramachandran	81,485	49.41%	▲5.36
AIADMK	Vaigaichelvan	63,431	38.46%	▼12.69
CPI	S. Senthil Kumar	9,817	5.95%	New
BJP	R. Vetrivel	3,223	1.95%	▲0.64
NOTA	None of the above	2,509	1.52%	New
NTK	Nagendran	1,404	0.85%	New
Margin of victory		18,054	10.95%	▲3.84
Turnout		165,182	79.30%	▼4.17
Total valid votes		164,909		
Rejected ballots		273	0.17%	▲0.03
Registered electors		208,309		▲16.03
DMK gain from AIADMK		Swing	▼1.74	

=== Assembly election 2011 ===
2011 Tamil Nadu Legislative Assembly election : Aruppukottai
Party	Candidate	Votes	%	±%
AIADMK	Vaigaichelvan	76,546	51.15%	▲13.38
DMK	Sattur Ramachandran	65,908	44.05%	▼0.83
BJP	R. Vetrivel	1,966	1.31%	▲0.28
Independent	Jegan	1,009	0.67%	
Margin of victory		10,638	7.11%	
Turnout		149,852	83.47%	▲11.76
Total valid votes		149,637		
Rejected ballots		215	0.14%	▲0.14
Registered electors		179,531		▲11.02
AIADMK gain from DMK		Swing	▲6.27	

=== Assembly election 2006 ===
2006 Tamil Nadu Legislative Assembly election : Aruppukottai
Party	Candidate	Votes	%	±%
DMK	Thangam Thenarasu	52,002	44.88%	▲4.56
AIADMK	K. Murugan	43,768	37.77%	New
DMDK	A. Bharathi Thasan	13,836	11.94%	New
AIFB	P. Krishna Ghandhi	2,234	1.93%	New
BJP	E. Chella Durai Pandian	1,193	1.03%	New
Margin of victory		8,234	7.11%	▲1.36
Turnout		115,968	71.71%	▲9.38
Total valid votes		115,875		
Registered electors		161,711		▼5.83
DMK gain from AIADMK		Swing	▼1.19	

=== Assembly election 2001 ===
2001 Tamil Nadu Legislative Assembly election : Aruppukottai
Party	Candidate	Votes	%	±%
AIADMK	K. K. Sivasamy	49,307	46.07%	▲8.88
DMK	Thangam Thenarasu	43,155	40.32%	▲1.24
MDMK	R. M. Shanmuga Sundaram	10,558	9.86%	New
Independent	Venkatesan. A	960	0.90%	
Independent	Rajagopalan. R	822	0.77%	
Independent	Regunathan. C	775	0.72%	
Margin of victory		6,152	5.75%	▲3.85
Turnout		107,040	62.33%	▼3.54
Total valid votes		107,026		
Rejected ballots		14	0.01%	▼6.59
Registered electors		171,719		▲2.66
AIADMK gain from DMK		Swing	▲6.99	

=== Assembly by-election 1998 ===
1998 Tamil Nadu Legislative Assembly by-election : Aruppukottai
Party	Candidate	Votes	%	±%
DMK	Thangam Thenarasu	40,223	39.08%	▼4.62
AIADMK	V. S. Panchavarnam	38,272	37.19%	▲9.35
PT	Manickam. P. T	12,484	12.13%	New
Independent	Palaniswamy. K	9,525	9.26%	
INC	Chandran. K	1,329	1.29%	New
Margin of victory		1,951	1.90%	▼13.96
Turnout		110,183	65.87%	▼2.44
Total valid votes		102,914		
Rejected ballots		7,269	6.60%	▲1.50
Registered electors		167,272		▲5.13
DMK hold		Swing		

=== Assembly election 1996 ===
1996 Tamil Nadu Legislative Assembly election : Aruppukottai
Party	Candidate	Votes	%	±%
DMK	V. Thangapandian	45,081	43.70%	▲5.38
AIADMK	K. Sundarapandian	28,716	27.84%	New
MDMK	R. M. Shanmuga Sundaram	16,987	16.47%	New
Independent	K. Chinnakaruppan	9,565	9.27%	
AIIC(T)	V. Perumal	1,077	1.04%	New
Margin of victory		16,365	15.86%	▼4.73
Turnout		108,687	68.31%	▲4.94
Total valid votes		103,165		
Rejected ballots		5,544	5.10%	▲1.71
Registered electors		159,117		▲0.71
DMK gain from AIADMK		Swing	▼15.21	

=== Assembly election 1991 ===
1991 Tamil Nadu Legislative Assembly election : Aruppukottai
Party	Candidate	Votes	%	±%
AIADMK	V. G. Manimeghalai	56,985	58.91%	New
DMK	R. M. Shanmuga Sundaram	37,066	38.32%	▼7.27
PMK	C. Karuppiah	1,350	1.40%	New
Margin of victory		19,919	20.59%	▲4.86
Turnout		100,120	63.37%	▼7.39
Total valid votes		96,730		
Rejected ballots		3,390	3.39%	▲1.62
Registered electors		157,995		▲11.28
AIADMK gain from DMK		Swing	▲13.32	

=== Assembly election 1989 ===
1989 Tamil Nadu Legislative Assembly election : Aruppukottai
Party	Candidate	Votes	%	±%
DMK	V. Thangapandian	44,990	45.59%	▲4.17
AIADMK	V. S. Panchavarnam	29,467	29.86%	New
INC	R. Chelliah	18,466	18.71%	New
AIFB	A. R. Perumal	3,521	3.57%	New
Margin of victory		15,523	15.73%	▲11.82
Turnout		100,465	70.76%	▼3.40
Total valid votes		98,688		
Rejected ballots		1,777	1.77%	▼2.56
Registered electors		141,982		▲14.59
DMK gain from AIADMK		Swing	▲0.27	

=== Assembly election 1984 ===
1984 Tamil Nadu Legislative Assembly election : Aruppukottai
Party	Candidate	Votes	%	±%
AIADMK	M. Pitchai	39,839	45.32%	▼8.35
DMK	V. Thangapandian	36,405	41.42%	▲2.47
Independent	E. Pandiperumal	10,809	12.30%	
Margin of victory		3,434	3.91%	▼10.82
Turnout		91,882	74.16%	▲5.44
Total valid votes		87,900		
Rejected ballots		3,982	4.33%	▲3.04
Registered electors		123,905		▲5.92
AIADMK hold		Swing		

=== Assembly election 1980 ===
1980 Tamil Nadu Legislative Assembly election : Aruppukottai
Party	Candidate	Votes	%	±%
AIADMK	M. Pitchai	42,589	53.67%	New
DMK	V. Thangapandian	30,904	38.95%	▲31.88
Independent	K. Karuppiah	4,742	5.98%	
Independent	K. Palani Kudumban	507	0.64%	
Margin of victory		11,685	14.73%	▼23.63
Turnout		80,387	68.72%	▼0.19
Total valid votes		79,347		
Rejected ballots		1,040	1.29%	▼0.15
Registered electors		116,985		▲3.74
AIADMK gain from AIADMK		Swing	▼2.56	

=== Assembly election 1977 ===
1977 Tamil Nadu Legislative Assembly election : Aruppukottai
Party	Candidate	Votes	%	±%
AIADMK	M. G. Ramachandran	43,065	56.23%	New
JP	M. Muthuvel Servai	13,687	17.87%	New
INC	A. Sivasamy	12,075	15.77%	New
DMK	S. M. Bose	5,415	7.07%	New
Independent	N. Seenivasan	645	0.84%	
Independent	G. Fitchai	550	0.72%	
Margin of victory		29,378	38.36%	▲24.41
Turnout		77,701	68.91%	▼8.04
Total valid votes		76,582		
Rejected ballots		1,119	1.44%	▲1.44
Registered electors		112,763		▲27.12
AIADMK gain from AIFB		Swing	▼0.44	

=== Assembly election 1971 ===
1971 Tamil Nadu Legislative Assembly election : Aruppukottai
Party	Candidate	Votes	%	±%
AIFB	Sowdi Sundara Bharathi	37,021	56.67%	New
SWA	M. Veerasamy	27,908	42.72%	▼11.96
Independent	S. Senthooranathan	403	0.62%	
Margin of victory		9,113	13.95%	▼0.68
Turnout		68,259	76.95%	▼3.82
Total valid votes		65,332		
Registered electors		88,706		▲9.70
AIFB gain from SWA		Swing	▲1.99	

=== Assembly election 1967 ===
1967 Madras State Legislative Assembly election : Aruppukottai
Party	Candidate	Votes	%	±%
SWA	S. S. Bharathi	34,153	54.68%	New
INC	T. K. Sundarm	25,012	40.04%	▼14.50
Independent	A. A. Naicker	984	1.58%	
Independent	S. Ramadoss	851	1.36%	
Independent	A. Sundararajan	633	1.01%	
Independent	T. Subramaniam	480	0.77%	
Margin of victory		9,141	14.63%	▲3.88
Turnout		65,316	80.77%	▲0.55
Total valid votes		62,465		
Registered electors		80,866		▼4.05
SWA gain from INC		Swing	▲0.14	

=== Assembly election 1962 ===
1962 Madras State Legislative Assembly election : Aruppukottai
Party	Candidate	Votes	%	±%
INC	T. Kadambavana Sundaram	35,597	54.54%	▲9.67
AIFB	Sowdi Sundara Bharathi	28,583	43.80%	New
Independent	N. C. Arumugam	1,084	1.66%	
Margin of victory		7,014	10.75%	▲0.48
Turnout		67,613	80.22%	▲8.02
Total valid votes		65,264		
Registered electors		84,282		▲5.62
INC gain from Independent		Swing	▼0.59	

=== Assembly election 1957 ===
1957 Madras State Legislative Assembly election : Aruppukottai
Party	Candidate	Votes	%	±%
Independent	M. D. Ramasami	31,765	55.13%	
INC	A. V. Thiruppathi	25,849	44.87%	▼3.40
Margin of victory		5,916	10.27%	▲4.42
Turnout		57,614	72.20%	▲2.09
Total valid votes		57,614		
Registered electors		79,794		▲5.81
Independent gain from INC		Swing	▲6.86	

=== Assembly election 1952 ===
1952 Madras State Legislative Assembly election : Aruppukottai
Party	Candidate	Votes	%	±%
INC	Jayarama Reddiar	25,521	48.27%	New
Independent	M. D. Ramasami	22,427	42.42%	New
Socialist Party (India)	Ethiraju	1,594	3.01%	New
Independent	Kadambiah Chettiar	1,569	2.97%	New
Independent	S. E. S. Somasundaram Chattiar	1,313	2.48%	New
Independent	Swami Gounder	446	0.84%	New
Margin of victory		3,094	5.85%	
Turnout		52,870	70.11%	
Total valid votes		52,870		
Registered electors		75,411		
INC win (new seat)				
