= T. Kadambavana Sundaram =

Indian politician

T. Kadambavana Sundaram was an Indian politician and former Member of the Legislative Assembly of Tamil Nadu. He was elected to the Tamil Nadu Legislative Assembly as an Indian National Congress candidate from Aruppukottai constituency in 1962 election.

== Electoral performance ==
Election	Constituency	Political party	Result	Vote %	Opposition			Ref
Election	Constituency	Political party	Result	Vote %	Candidate	Political party	Vote %	Ref
1962	Aruppukottai	INC	Won	54.54%	Sowdi Sundara Bharathi	AIFB	43.80%	
