= S. Alagu Thevar =

Indian politician

A. A. Thevar was an Indian politician and former Member of the Legislative Assembly. He was elected to the Tamil Nadu legislative assembly as a Swatantra Party candidate from Sivakasi constituency in the 1967 election and as a Forward Bloc candidate from Sattur constituency in the 1971 election.
