= M. S. R. Rajavarman =

Indian politician

M. S. R. Rajavarman is an Indian politician and is Member of the Legislative Assembly of Tamil Nadu. He was elected to the Tamil Nadu legislative assembly as an All India Anna Dravida Munnetra Kazhagam candidate from Sattur constituency in the by-election in 2019.

== Electoral performance ==
2021 Tamil Nadu Legislative Assembly election: Sattur
Party	Candidate	Votes	%	±%
DMK	A. R. R. Raghuraman	74,174	38.94%	+0.81
AIADMK	R. K. Ravichandhran	62,995	33.07%	−7.58
AMMK	M. S. R. Rajavarman	32,916	17.28%	New
NTK	K. Pandi	12,626	6.63%	+5.76
IJK	M. Bharathi	1,751	0.92%	New
PT	G. Marikannan	1,599	0.84%	New
NOTA	NOTA	1,297	0.68%	−0.15
Margin of victory		11,179	5.87%	3.35%
Turnout		190,486	75.18%	−3.04%
Rejected ballots		218	0.11%	
Registered electors		253,363		
DMK gain from AIADMK		Swing	-1.71%	

2019 Tamil Nadu Legislative Assembly by-elections: Sattur
Party	Candidate	Votes	%	±%
AIADMK	M. S. R. Rajavarman	76,977	42.20	+1.55
DMK	V. Srinivasan	76,521	41.60	+3.47
AMMK	S. G. Subramanian	12,428	6.84	+6.84
NTK	P. Sureshkumar	5,004	2.76	+1.90
MNM	N. Sundararaj	3,899	2.15	+2.15
NOTA	None of the Above	1,728	0.93	N/A
Majority		456	0.25	−2.37
Turnout		1,81,083	77.01	−1.30
Registered electors		2,36,696		
AIADMK hold		Swing	+1.55	
