= T. Ramachandran (INC politician) =

Indian politician

Member of the Tamil Nadu Legislative Assembly
- In office 12 May 2021 – 5 May 2026
- Preceded by: M. Rajanayagam
- Succeeded by: E. Rathinasabhapathy
- Constituency: Aranthangi

Personal details
- Party: Indian National Congress

T. Ramachandran is an Indian politician who is a Member of Legislative Assembly of Tamil Nadu. He was elected from Aranthangi as an Indian National Congress candidate in 2021.

== Electoral performance ==
Election	Constituency	Political party	Result	Vote %	Opposition			Ref
Election	Constituency	Political party	Result	Vote %	Candidate	Political party	Vote %	Ref
2016	Aranthangi	INC	Lost	43.74%	E. Rathinasabhapathy	AIADMK	45.22%	
2021	Aranthangi	INC	Won	48.85%	M. Rajanayagam	AIADMK	30.41%	-
2026	Aranthangi	INC	Lost	34.58%	J. Mohamed Farvas	TVK	40.08%	-
