= K. K. Sivasamy =

Member of the Tamil Nadu Legislative Assembly
- In office 2001–2006
- Preceded by: Thangam Thenarasu
- Succeeded by: Thangam Thenarasu
- Constituency: Aruppukottai

Personal details
- Party: All India Anna Dravida Munnetra Kazhagam

K. K. Sivasamy is an Indian politician and former Member of the Legislative Assembly of Tamil Nadu. He was elected to the Tamil Nadu legislative assembly as an Anna Dravida Munnetra Kazhagam candidate from Aruppukottai constituency in 2001 election.

== Electoral performance ==
Election	Constituency	Political party	Result	Vote %	Opposition			Ref
Election	Constituency	Political party	Result	Vote %	Candidate	Political party	Vote %	Ref
2001	Aruppukottai	AIADMK	Won	46.07%	Thangam Thenarasu	DMK	40.32%	
2021	Tiruchuli	AMMK	Lost	3.74%	Thangam Thennarasu	DMK	59.41%	-
