= S. S. Karuppasamy =

Indian politician

S. S. Karuppasamy was an Indian politician and former Member of the Legislative Assembly. He was elected to the Tamil Nadu Legislative Assembly as a Dravida Munnetra Kazhagam candidate from Sattur constituency in 1989 election.
