= V. Thangapandian =

Indian politician

V. Thangapandian (died 31 July 1997) was an Indian politician and Former Cabinet Minister in Tamil Nadu Government. Member of the Legislative Assembly of Tamil Nadu. He was elected to the Tamil Nadu legislative assembly as a Dravida Munnetra Kazhagam candidate from Aruppukottai constituency in 1989 and 1996 elections.

Thangapandian died on 31 July 1997.

== Electoral performance ==
Election	Constituency	Political party	Result	Vote %	Opposition			Ref
Election	Constituency	Political party	Result	Vote %	Candidate	Political party	Vote %	Ref
1980	Aruppukottai	DMK	Lost	38.95%	M. Pitchai	AIADMK	53.67%	
1984	Aruppukottai	DMK	Lost	41.42%	M. Pitchai	AIADMK	45.32%	
1989	Aruppukottai	DMK	Won	45.59%	V. S. Panchavarnam	AIADMK	29.86%	
1996	Aruppukottai	DMK	Won	43.70%	K. Sundarapandian	AIADMK	27.84%	
