= Mallankinaru =

- Town
- Location in Tamil Nadu, India
- Coordinates: 9°36′19″N 78°04′17″E
- Country: India
- State: Tamil Nadu
- District: Virudhunagar

Population (2001)
  - Total: 11,804

Languages
  - Official: Tamil
- Time zone: UTC+5:30 (IST)

Mallankinaru is a panchayat town in Virudhunagar district in the Indian state of Tamil Nadu.

== Demographics ==
As of 2001 India census, Mallankinaru had a population of 11,804. Males constitute 51% of the population and females 49%. 13 km from Virudhunagar. Mallankinaru has an average literacy rate of 64%, higher than the national average of 59.5%: male literacy is 74%, and female literacy is 53%. In Mallankinaru, 12% of the population is under 6 years of age.

== Notable people ==
- S. Ramakrishnan, Tamil writer
