= Vaigaichelvan =

Indian politician

Vaigaiselvan is an Indian politician and was a member of the Tamil Nadu Legislative Assembly from the Aruppukottai constituency from 2011 to 2016. He represented earlier the All India Anna Dravida Munnetra Kazhagam (AIADMK) party and now he represents Tamilaga Vettri Kazhagam (TVK).
