= Thayaga Marumalarchi Kazhagam =

Was a political party in the Indian state of Tamil Nadu

Thayaga Marumalarchi Kazhagam (Tamil: தாயக மறுமலர்ச்சி கழகம், lit. 'Homeland Revival Federation') was a political party in the Indian state of Tamil Nadu launched by Tamil actor and filmmaker T. Rajendar in 1991. The party was formed as a split from Dravida Munnetra Kazhagam (DMK). The party contested in 11 seats in the 1991 Tamil Nadu Assembly elections and won in 2 of them (2 seats won by Thirunavukksar and KKSSR Ramachandran won as Alliance Anna Puratchi Thalaivar Makkal Munnetra Kazhagam candidates).

In 1995, after Vaiko's departure from the DMK and the formation of Marumalarchi Dravida Munnetra Kazhagam (MDMK), Rajendar's TMK merged with the DMK. Rajendar left the DMK again in 2004, to form the All India Latchiya Dravida Munnetra Kazhagam (transl. All India Ideal DMK).
