= 2009 elections in India =

2009 Indian elections
- ← 2007 2008 2009 2010 2011 →
- Incumbent Prime Minister: Manmohan Singh (UPA)
- Next Lok Sabha: 15th

Lok Sabha elections
- Seats contested: 543

Rajya Sabha elections
- Overall control: Indian National Congress
- Seats contested: TBD
- Net seat change: TBD

State elections
- States contested: 7
- Net state change: TBD

The 2009 elections in India includes the general election and elections to the Rajya Sabha, to state legislative assemblies, to Panchayats and urban local bodies.

== General election ==
A national election occurred between 16 April and 13 May 2009, to constitute the 15th Lok Sabha.

Date*	Election	Government before	Prime Minister before election	Government after	Elected Prime Minister
16 April – 13 May 2009	Lok Sabha	United Progressive Alliance	Manmohan Singh	United Progressive Alliance	Manmohan Singh

== Lok Sabha by-elections ==
S.No	Date	Constituency	State/UT	MP before election	Party before election	Reason	Elected MP	Party after election
1	7 November 2009	Firozabad	Uttar Pradesh	Akhilesh Yadav	Samajwadi Party	Retained Kannauj and vacated Firozabad	Raj Babbar	Indian National Congress

== Legislative Assembly elections ==
Indian media reporting indicate elections for the following state legislative assemblies held in 2009.

Date(s)	State	Government before	Chief Minister before	Government after	Elected Chief Minister	Maps
16 April 2009 & 23 April 2009	Andhra Pradesh	Indian National Congress	Y. S. Rajasekhara Reddy	Indian National Congress	Y. S. Rajasekhara Reddy	
16 April 2009 & 23 April 2009	Odisha	Biju Janata Dal	Naveen Patnaik	Biju Janata Dal	Naveen Patnaik	
30 April 2009	Sikkim	Sikkim Democratic Front	Pawan Kumar Chamling	Sikkim Democratic Front	Pawan Kumar Chamling	
13 October 2009	Arunachal Pradesh	Indian National Congress	Dorjee Khandu	Indian National Congress	Dorjee Khandu	
13 October 2009	Haryana	Indian National Congress	Bhupinder Singh Hooda	Indian National Congress	Bhupinder Singh Hooda	
13 October 2009	Maharashtra	Indian National Congress	Ashok Chavan	Indian National Congress	Ashok Chavan	
13 October 2009	Maharashtra	Nationalist Congress Party	Ashok Chavan	Nationalist Congress Party	Ashok Chavan	
25 November 2009 - 18 December 2009	Jharkhand	Independent politician	Madhu Koda	Jharkhand Mukti Morcha	Shibu Soren	
25 November 2009 - 18 December 2009	Jharkhand	Independent politician	Madhu Koda	Bharatiya Janata Party	Shibu Soren	

== Legislative assembly by elections ==
=== Bihar ===
S.No	Date	Constituency	MLA before election	Party before election	Elected MLA	Party after election
186	28 May 2009	Fatuha	Saryug Paswan	Janata Dal (United)	Arun Manjhi	Janata Dal (United)

=== Delhi ===
S.No	Date	Constituency	MLA before election	Party before election	Elected MLA	Party after election
64	07 May 2009	Rohtas Nagar	Ram Babu Sharma	Indian National Congress	Vipin Sharma	Indian National Congress

=== Jammu and Kashmir ===
S.No	Date	Constituency	MLA before election	Party before election	Elected MLA	Party after election
54	23 April 2009	Bhaderwah	Ghulam Nabi Azad	Indian National Congress	Mohammed Sharief Niaz	Indian National Congress
24	07 May 2009	Sonawar	Farooq Abdullah	Jammu & Kashmir National Conference	Mohammad Yasin Shah	Jammu & Kashmir National Conference
18	03 June 2009	Hazratbal	Farooq Abdullah	Jammu & Kashmir National Conference	Sheikh Mustafa Kamal	Jammu & Kashmir National Conference

=== Jharkhand ===
S.No	Date	Constituency	MLA before election	Party before election	Elected MLA	Party after election
58	08 January 2009	Tamar	Ramesh Singh Munda	Janata Dal (United)	Gopal Krishna Patar	Jharkhand Party

=== Karnataka ===
S.No	Date	Constituency	MLA before election	Party before election	Elected MLA	Party after election
50	23 April 2009	Bidar	Gurupadappa Nagamarapalli	Indian National Congress	Rahim Khan	Indian National Congress

=== Meghalaya ===
S.No	Date	Constituency	MLA before election	Party before election	Elected MLA	Party after election
09	26 February 2009	Umroi	E. K. Mawlong	United Democratic Party	Stanlywiss Rymbai	Indian National Congress

=== Mizoram ===
S.No	Date	Constituency	MLA before election	Party before election	Elected MLA	Party after election
29	16 April 2009	South Tuipui	Lal Thanhawla	Indian National Congress	John Siamkunga	Indian National Congress

=== Nagaland ===
S.No	Date	Constituency	MLA before election	Party before election	Elected MLA	Party after election
03	16 April 2009	Dimapur III	Azheto Zhimomi	Indian National Congress	Azheto Zhimomi	Naga People's Front
17	16 April 2009	Chizami	Deo Nukhu	Indian National Congress	Deo Nukhu	Naga People's Front
41	16 April 2009	Tizit	T Aloh	Indian National Congress	T Aloh	Naga People's Front
54	16 April 2009	Tuensang Sadar II	Kejong Chang	Indian National Congress	Kejong Chang	Naga People's Front

=== Punjab ===
S.No	Date	Constituency	MLA before election	Party before election	Elected MLA	Party after election
36	12 June 2009	Nur Mahal	Gurdip Singh Bhullar	Shiromani Akali Dal	Rajwinder Kaur Bhullar	Shiromani Akali Dal
05	03 August 2009	Kahnuwan	Partap Singh Bajwa	Indian National Congress	Sewa Singh Sekhwan	Shiromani Akali Dal
70	03 August 2009	Banur	Kanwaljit Singh	Shiromani Akali Dal	Jasjit Singh Bunny	Shiromani Akali Dal
93	03 August 2009	Jalalabad	Sher Singh Ghubaya	Shiromani Akali Dal	Sukhbir Singh Badal	Shiromani Akali Dal

=== Tamil Nadu ===
S.No	Date	Constituency	MLA before election	Party before election	Elected MLA	Party after election
137	09 January 2009	Thirumangalam	Veera Elavarasu	Marumalarchi Dravida Munnetra Kazhagam	Latha Athiyaman	Dravida Munnetra Kazhagam
103	18 August 2009	Thondamuthur	M. Kannappan	Marumalarchi Dravida Munnetra Kazhagam	M. N. Kandaswamy	Indian National Congress
134	18 August 2009	Cumbum	N. Eramakrishnan	Marumalarchi Dravida Munnetra Kazhagam	N. Eramakrishnan	Dravida Munnetra Kazhagam
197	18 August 2009	Ilaiyangudi	Raja Kannappan	Dravida Munnetra Kazhagam	Suba. Mathiarasan	Dravida Munnetra Kazhagam

=== Tripura ===
S.No	Date	Constituency	MLA before election	Party before election	Elected MLA	Party after election
08	28 May 2009	Town Bordowali	Sudhir Ranjan Majumdar	Indian National Congress	Ashish Kumar Saha	Indian National Congress

=== Uttar Pradesh ===
S.No	Date	Constituency	MLA before election	Party before election	Elected MLA	Party after election
233	26 February 2009	Bhadohi	Archana Saroj	Bahujan Samaj Party	Madhubala	Samajwadi Party
45	7 November 2009	Powayan	Mithlesh Kumar	Samajwadi Party	Dhirendra Prasad	Bahujan Samaj Party
86	7 November 2009	Lucknow West	Lalji Tandon	Bharatiya Janata Party	Shyam Kishore Shukla	Indian National Congress
181	7 November 2009	Padrauna	Ratanjit Pratap Narain Singh	Indian National Congress	Swami Prasad Maurya	Bahujan Samaj Party
239	7 November 2009	Rari	Dhananjay Singh	Janata Dal	Rajdeo Singh	Bahujan Samaj Party
288	7 November 2009	Etawah	Mahendra Singh Rajput	Samajwadi Party	Mahendra Singh Rajput	Bahujan Samaj Party
290	7 November 2009	Bharthana	Mulayam Singh Yadav	Samajwadi Party	Shiv Prasad Yadav	Bahujan Samaj Party

=== West Bengal ===
S.No	Date	Constituency	MLA before election	Party before election	Elected MLA	Party after election
206	05 January 2010	Nandigram	Sheikh Mohammad Illias	Communist Party of India (Marxist)	Phiroja Bibi	Trinamool Congress

== See also ==
- Navin Chawla
- N. Gopalaswami
