= First Ramachandran ministry =

Government of Tamil Nadu, India (1977–1980)

First Ramachandran Ministry
- 4th Ministry of Tamil Nadu
- Head of the government
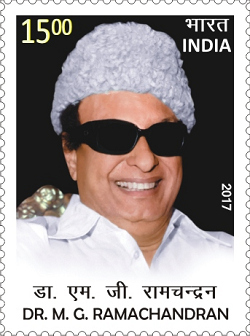
- Dr. M. G. Ramachandran; Former Chief Minister of Tamil Nadu
- Date formed: 30 June 1977
- Date dissolved: 17 February 1980

People and organisations
- Governor: Prabhudas B. Patwari
- Chief Minister: M. G. Ramachandran
- Chief Minister's history: Indian film actor
- Total no. of members: 18
- Member party: All India Anna Dravida Munnetra Kazhagam
- Status in legislature: Majority
- Opposition party: Dravida Munnetra Kazhagam
- Opposition leader: M. Karunanidhi

History
- Election: 1977
- Outgoing election: 1971
- Legislature terms: 2 years, 232 days
- Predecessor: Second Karunanidhi ministry
- Successor: Second Ramachandran ministry

The First Ministry of Ramachandran was the Council of Ministers, headed by M. G. Ramachandran, that was formed after the sixth legislative assembly election, which was held in two phases on 12th and 14 June 1977. The results of the election were announced in June 1977, and this led to the formation of the 6th Assembly. On 30 June 1977, the council took office.

== Constitutional requirement ==
=== For the Council of Ministers to aid and advise Governor ===
According to Article 163 of the Indian Constitution,

# There shall be a Council of Ministers with the Chief Minister at the head to aid and advise the Governor in the exercise of his function, except in so far as he is by or under this Constitution required to exercise his functions or any of them in his discretion.

1. If any question arises whether any matter is or is not a matter as respects which the Governor is by or under this Constitution required to act in his discretion, the decision of the Governor in his discretion shall be final, and the validity of anything done by the Governor shall not be called in question on the ground that he ought or ought not to have acted in his discretion.
2. The question whether any, and if so what, advice was tendered by Ministers to the Governor shall not be inquired into in any court.

This means that the Ministers serve under the pleasure of the Governor and he/she may remove them, on the advice of the Chief Minister, whenever they want.

The Chief Minister shall be appointed by the Governor and the other Ministers shall be appointed by the Governor on the advice of the Chief Minister, and the Minister shall hold office during the pleasure of the Governor:
Provided that in the States of Bihar, Madhya Pradesh and Odisha, there shall be a Minister in charge of tribal welfare who may in addition be in charge of the welfare of the Scheduled Castes and backward classes or any other work.

# The Council of Minister shall be collectively responsible to the Legislative Assembly of the State.

1. Before a Minister enters upon his office, the Governor shall administer to him the oaths of office and of secrecy according to the forms set out for the purpose in the Third Schedule.
2. A Minister who for any period of six consecutive months is not a member of the Legislature of the State shall at the expiration of that period cease to be a Minister.
3. The salaries and allowances of Ministers shall be such as the Legislature of the State may from time to time by law determine and, until the Legislature of the State so determines, shall be a specified in the Second Schedule.

== Council of Ministers ==
=== Cabinet (30 June 1977 – 6 May 1978) ===
Chief Minister
No.	Name	Constituency	Portfolio	Departments	Political party
1	M. G. Ramachandran	Aruppukkottai	Chief Minister	Public; General Administration; Matters relating to Indian Civil Service and Indian Administrative Service Officers; District Revenue Officers; Deputy Collectors; Police; Elections; Passport; Prohibition; Health; Medicine; Religious Endowments; Prevention of Corruption and; Industries	All India Anna Dravida Munnetra Kazhagam
Cabinet Ministers
2	Nanjil K. Manoharan	Palayamkottai	Minister for Finance	Finance; Planning; Commercial Taxes and Excise; Revenue and; Legislature	All India Anna Dravida Munnetra Kazhagam
3	Panruti S. Ramachandran	Panruti	Minister for Public Works	Public Works; Minor Irrigation including Special Minor Irrigation Programme Works; Mines and Minerals and; Iron and Steel Control	All India Anna Dravida Munnetra Kazhagam
4	K. Narayanaswamy	Member of the Legislative Council	Minister for Law	Law; Courts Prisons; Legislation on Weights and Measures; Legislation on money lending; Legislation on chits and; Registration of Companies	All India Anna Dravida Munnetra Kazhagam
5	G. R. Edmund	Tirunelveli	Minister for Food and Cooperation	Food; Food Production; Cooperation and; Fisheries	All India Anna Dravida Munnetra Kazhagam
6	R. M. Veerappan	Member of the Legislative Council	Minister for Information and Publicity	Information and Publicity Film Technology; Tourism Development Corporation and; Cinematograph Act	All India Anna Dravida Munnetra Kazhagam
7	C. Aranganayagam	Coimbatore West	Minister for Education	Education (including Technical Education); Official Language; Approved Schools; Employment and; Training	All India Anna Dravida Munnetra Kazhagam
8	K. Kalimuthu	Thiruparankundram	Minister for Local Administration	Municipal Administration; Community Development; Panchayats; Panchayat Unions; Village; Industries; Rural Industries; Project and; Rural Indebtedness	All India Anna Dravida Munnetra Kazhagam
9	S. Raghavanandam	Member of the Legislative Council	Minister for Labour	Labour; Housing; Slum Clearance Board; Statistics; Tamil Nadu Water Supply and Drainage Board and; Town Planning	All India Anna Dravida Munnetra Kazhagam
10	P. Soundarapandian	Krishnarayapuram	Minister for Harijan Welfare	Harijan Welfare; Backward Classes; Stationery and Printing; Government Press and; Hill Tribes	All India Anna Dravida Munnetra Kazhagam
11	C. Ponnaiyan	Tiruchengode	Minister for Transport	Transport; Nationalized Transports; Motor Vehicles Act; Highways and; Ports	All India Anna Dravida Munnetra Kazhagam
12	P. T. Saraswathi	Thirumangalam	Minister for Social Welfare	Social Welfare (including Women and Children Welfare); Animal Husbandry; Beggars Home; Orphanages; Vigilance Service; Indian Overseas and Refugees and; Evacuees	All India Anna Dravida Munnetra Kazhagam
13	P. Kolandaivelu	Udumalaipettai	Minister for Agriculture	Agriculture; Agriculture Refinance; Agricultural Engineering Wing; Agro Engineering Wing; Milk; Dairy Development Corporation and; Operation Flood Project	All India Anna Dravida Munnetra Kazhagam
14	K. Raja Mohammed	Member of the Legislative Council	Minister for Handlooms and Textiles	Accommodation Control; News Print Control and; Agro Service Cooperative Societies at Block, District and Apex Level (including Federation, Wafts, Textiles, Yarn and Handloom)	All India Anna Dravida Munnetra Kazhagam

=== Cabinet (7 May 1978 – 17 February 1980) ===
Chief Minister
No.	Name	Constituency	Portfolio	Departments	Political Party
1	M. G. Ramachandran	Aruppukkottai	Chief Minister	Public; General Administration; Indian Administrative Service Officers; District Revenue Officers; Deputy Collectors; Police; Passport; Prohibition; Prevention of Corruption; Large Scale Industries; Textiles and; Mines and Minerals	All India Anna Dravida Munnetra Kazhagam
Cabinet Ministers
2	Nanjil K. Manoharan	Palayamkottai	Minister for Finance	Finance; Planning; Legislature; Public Works (Buildings) and; Establishment Matters relating to the Public Works Department	All India Anna Dravida Munnetra Kazhagam
3	Panruti S. Ramachandran	Panruti	Minister for Electricity	Electricity and; Iron and Steel Control	All India Anna Dravida Munnetra Kazhagam
4	K. A. Krishnaswamy	Member of the Legislative Council	Minister for Cooperation	Cooperation and; Registration	All India Anna Dravida Munnetra Kazhagam
5	S. D. Somasundaram	Member of the Legislative Council	Minister for Revenue	Revenue; Commercial Taxes; Legislation on money lending; Legislation on chits and; Excise	All India Anna Dravida Munnetra Kazhagam
6	G. R. Edmund	Tirunelveli	Minister for Food-Price Control and Cooperation	Food; Fisheries; Youth Service Crops; Backward Classes; Elections and; Ex-Serviceman	All India Anna Dravida Munnetra Kazhagam
7	R. M. Veerappan	Member of the Legislative Council	Minister for Information and Hindu Religious Endowments	Information and Publicity; Film; Technology; Tourism; Tourism Development Corporation; Cinematography Act; Hindu Religion and Charitable Endowments; Forests; Grant of liquor permits and; Cinchona	All India Anna Dravida Munnetra Kazhagam
8	K. Narayanaswamy	Member of the Legislative Council	Minister for Law	Law; Courts Prisons; Legislation on Weights and Measures and; Registration of Companies	All India Anna Dravida Munnetra Kazhagam
9	C. Aranganayagam	Coimbatore West	Minister for Education	Education (including Technical Education); Official Language; Approved Schools; Employment and; Training	All India Anna Dravida Munnetra Kazhagam
10	K. Kalimuthu	Thiruparankundram	Minister for Local Administration-Rural Indebtedness	Municipal Administration; Community Development; Panchayat and; Panchayat Unions	All India Anna Dravida Munnetra Kazhagam
11	S. Raghavanandam	Member of the Legislative Council	Minister for Labour	Labour; Housing; Slum Clearance Board; Statistics; Tamil Nadu Water Supply and Drainage Board; Town Planning and; Accommodation Control	All India Anna Dravida Munnetra Kazhagam
12	P. Soundarapandian	Krishnarayapuram	Minister for Harijan Welfare	Harijan Welfare; Backward Classes; Stationery and Printing; Government Press; News Paper Control; Hill Tribes and; Bonded Labour	All India Anna Dravida Munnetra Kazhagam
13	C. Ponnaiyan	Tiruchengode	Minister for Transport	Transport; Nationalized Transports; Motor Vehicles Act and; Ports	All India Anna Dravida Munnetra Kazhagam
14	P. Kolandaivelu	Udumalaipettai	Minister for Agriculture and Irrigation-Agro Engineering	Agriculture; Agriculture Refinance; Agricultural Engineering Wing; Agro Service; Co-operative Societies; Irrigation (including Minor Irrigation)	All India Anna Dravida Munnetra Kazhagam
15	K. Raja Mohammed	Member of the Legislative Council	Minister for Rural Industries-Wakfs	Rural Industries (including Villages); Cottage and Small Industries; Milk and; Dairy Development	All India Anna Dravida Munnetra Kazhagam
16	R. Soundararajan	Srirangam	Minister for Health	Health	All India Anna Dravida Munnetra Kazhagam
17	P. T. Saraswathi	Thirumangalam	Minister for Social Welfare	Social Welfare (including Women and Children Welfare); Animal Husbandry; Beggars Home; Orphanages; Correctional Administration; Indian Overseas and Refugees; Evacuees and; Highway	All India Anna Dravida Munnetra Kazhagam
18	Subbulakshmi Jagadeesan	Modakkurichi	Minister for Khadi and Handlooms	Handlooms; Khadi and; Yarn	All India Anna Dravida Munnetra Kazhagam
