= M. C. A. Rethinasamy Thevar =

Member of Tamil Nadu Legislative Assembly
- In office 1971–1976
- Preceded by: N. S. V. Chitthan
- Succeeded by: P. T. Saraswathy
- Constituency: Tirumangalam

Personal details
- Born: 1 October 1914 Tirumangalam
- Party: Forward bloc
- Spouse: Rathina Vellammal
- Children: M. S. K. Bhavani Rajenthiran (Former Ramanathapuram MP)
- Profession: Theatre Owner

M. C. A. Rethinasamy Thevar was an Indian politician and a former Member of the Tamil Nadu Legislative Assembly. He hailed from Tirumangalam in Madurai district. He received his education at P. K. N. Higher Secondary School in Tirumangalam. He was a member of the Dravida Munnetra Kazhagam (DMK). In the 1971 Tamil Nadu Legislative Assembly election, he contested from the Tirumangalam constituency as a Forward Bloc candidate and was elected as a Member of the Tamil Nadu Legislative Assembly.

== Electoral Performance ==
=== Tamil Nadu Legislative elections ===
Year	Constituency	Party	Result	Votes	%
1971	Tirumangalam	Forward Bloc	Won	36,468	56.97%
