= Sedapatti M. Manimaran =

Indian politician

Sedapatti Manimaram
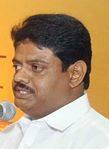
- Manimaram at DMK Executive Committee held in 2015

Member of the Tamil Nadu Legislative Assembly
- Incumbent
- Assumed office 4 May 2026
- Preceded by: R. B. Udhayakumar
- Constituency: Thirumangalam

Personal details
- Party: Dravida Munnetra Kazhagam
- Parent: Sedapatti Muthaih (father)
- Occupation: Politician

Sedapatti Muthiah Manimaram is an Indian politician who is a Member of the 17th Legislative Assembly of Tamil Nadu. He was elected from Thirumangalam as an DMK candidate in 2026.

== Elections contested ==
Manimaran is the youngest son of former Union Minister Sedapatti R. Muthiah. Manimaran is the current District Secretary of Madurai South District, DMK party. Despite loosing earlier elections he was kept on working rigorously for his party in the district and has made his party win in many elections including local body elections and his party aides win in the previous Parliament elections. Due to his constant local presence with a sustained commitment to the people of the constituency, he secured a decisive victory for the party, unseating the long time incumbent R.B. Udhayakumar, who was considered unshakeable and dismantled his political fortress in the 2026 Tamil Nadu Legislative Assembly Election .

2026 Tamil Nadu Legislative Assembly election: Thirumangalam
Party	Candidate	Votes	%	±%
DMK	Sedapatti M. Manimaran	88,291	38.22	▼0.90
AIADMK	Udhayakumar R B	64,484	27.92	▼17.59
TVK	N. Sathishkumar	60,826	26.33	New
AIPTMMK	Jeevitha Nachiyar B.	2,851	1.23	New
NOTA	NOTA	933	0.4	
Margin of victory		23,807	10.31	▲3.92
Turnout		2,30,980	89.1	▲10.24
Rejected ballots				
Registered electors		259,225		
DMK gain from AIADMK		Swing		

2021 Tamil Nadu Legislative Assembly election: Thirumangalam
Party	Candidate	Votes	%	±%
AIADMK	R. B. Udhayakumar	100,338	45.51%	−1.49
DMK	Sedapatti M. Manimaran	86,251	39.12%	New
AMMK	K. Athi Narayanan	13,780	6.25%	New
MNM	M. Ramkumar	2,775	1.26%	New
Independent	S. Veeranan	1,576	0.71%	New
Margin of victory		14,087	6.39%	−5.17%
Turnout		220,495	78.86%	0.88%
Rejected ballots		458	0.21%	
Registered electors		279,598		
AIADMK hold		Swing	-1.49%	

2016 Tamil Nadu Legislative Assembly election: Thiruparankundram
Party	Candidate	Votes	%	±%
AIADMK	S. M. Seenivel	93,453	47.32	New
DMK	Sedapatti Manimaran	70,461	35.68	New
CPI	K. Kandasamy	15,275	7.73	New
BJP	S. Arumugam	7,698	3.90	▲1.72
None of the Above	None of the Above	3,111	1.58	New
Majority		22,992	11.64	▼18.18
Turnout		197,650	70.69	▼5.39
AIADMK gain from DMDK		Swing	New	

2011 Tamil Nadu Legislative Assembly election: Thirumangalam
Party	Candidate	Votes	%	±%
AIADMK	M. Muthuramalingam	101,494	55.55%	New
DMK	Sedapatti Manimaran	75,127	41.12%	+7.09
Independent	P. Jayapandi	1,469	0.80%	New
BSP	V. Vaiyadurai	1,389	0.76%	+0.04
Margin of victory		26,367	14.43%	10.99%
Turnout		182,703	81.63%	10.70%
Registered electors		223,822		
AIADMK gain from DMK		Swing	18.07%	
