= A. K. C. Sundaravel =

Indian politician (died 2019)

MLA of Tirupattur, Vellore
- In office 1991–1996
- Preceded by: G. Shanmugam
- Succeeded by: B. Sundaram

Chairman of Tiruppattur
- In office 2001–2006

Personal details
- Died: 6 April 2019
- Party: Anna Dravida Munnetra Kazhagam

A. K. C. Sundaravel was an Indian politician belonging to Amma Makkal Munnetra Kazhagam. He was elected as a member of Tamil Nadu Legislative Assembly in 1991. He died by road accident on 6 April 2019 at the age of 70.
