= S. R. Subramania Adityan =

Indian politician

S. R. Subramania Adithan

M.L.A (1984)
- In office 1984–1989
- Constituency: Tiruchendur

Thakkar (1982-1987) - 2 twice (Tiruchendur Sri Subramania Swami Devasthanam)
- In office 1982–1984
- In office 1985–1987

Personal details
- Born: 24 March 1948 (age 78) Nagarcoil, Travancore
- Died: June 25, 2020 (aged 72)
- Party: not in politics (formerly in ADMK)
- Spouse: Vijaya Anbubai
- Children: V. M. S Ramaswamy Athithan; S. Thananjeya Athithan
- Parents: V. M. S. Ramasamy Adithan (father); R. Babu Sundaram Ammal (mother)

S. Ramasamy Subramania Adityan is a former Indian politician, elected to the Tamil Nadu legislative assembly as an Anna Dravida Munnetra Kazhagam candidate from Tiruchendur constituency in 1984 election, was then twice Takkar of Tiruchendur Sri Subramania Swami Devasthanam during 1982–1987. Presently he is the President of Thakshina Maara Nadar Sangam and post of Chair Person of Thoothukudi Amateur Kabodi Association.

== Personal life ==
He was born to V. M. S. Ramasamy Adithan and R. Babu Sundaram Ammal on 24 March 1948 at Nagarcoil, Travancore. He is married to his aunt's (from the father side) daughter, Vijaya Anbubai. They have two children, V. M. S Ramaswamy Athithan and S. Thananjeya Athithan.

== Social & Community Services ==
=== Current Positions Holding ===
| Position | Institution |
|---|---|
| President | Dakshina Mara Nadar Sangam |
| Council Member | Dr.Sivanthi Athithanar College Of Engineering |
| Council Member | Aditanar College of Atrs and Science |
| Chairperson | Thoothukudi Amateur Kabodi Association |
| President (south zone) | Dr. Sivanthi Adithanar Narpani Mandram |

=== Other Posts ===
He twice was Takkar of Tiruchendur Sri Subramania Swami Devasthanam during the years 1982–1984 and 1985–1987

== Political career ==
His political debut was after demes of his predecessor Mr. S. Kesava Adithan who died in a car accident on 26 November 1982. As a re-place he was elected to Tiruchendur in the year of 1984. After demise of MGR he aligned with Mrs. Ganaki Ramachandran and contested the Sattangulam Constituency with symbol double pegon(இரட்டை புரா). But fortunately got 3rd position only. Then after he join back to the realigned ADMK under the leadership of J. Jayalalitha. After brief time he abstained from the party activities and turned himself into a social welfare sympathiser.

=== Electoral performance in Assembly elections ===
| Year | Status | Constituency | Party | Votes | Runner-up/Winner | Party | Votes |
|---|---|---|---|---|---|---|---|
| 1984 | Winner | Tiruchendur | ADMK | 45,953 | K. P. Kandasamy | DMK | 43,565 |
| 1989 | 3rd | Sattangulam | ADMK | 20,127 | Kumari Ananthan (Winner) | INC | 24,913 |
