= V. Arumugam =

V. Arumugam may refer to:

- V. Arumugam (Indian politician)
- V. Arumugam (Malaysian politician)
