= Tiruppattur, Vellore Assembly constituency =

State Legislative Assembly Constituency in Tamil Nadu

Coordinates: 12°29′57.30″N 78°31′24.66″E

Tirupattur
- Constituency No. 50 for the Tamil Nadu Legislative Assembly

Constituency details
- Country: India
- Region: South India
- State: Tamil Nadu
- District: Tirupathur
- Lok Sabha constituency: Tiruvannamalai
- Established: 1951
- Total electors: 2,27,352

Member of Legislative Assembly
- 17th Tamil Nadu Legislative Assembly
- Incumbent Dr. Thirupathi. N
- Party: TVK
- Alliance: TVK+
- Elected year: 2026

Tirupattur is a state assembly constituency in Tirupattur district in Tamil Nadu, India. Its State Assembly Constituency number is 50. It is one of the 234 State Legislative Assembly Constituencies in Tamil Nadu, in India. Most successful party: DMK (nine times).

Since 2016, Tirupattur Assembly constituency has been represented in the Tamil Nadu Legislative Assembly by A. Nallathambi of DMK. He was re-elected in 2021.

== Members of Legislative Assembly ==
Year	Name	Party
Madras State
1952	E. L. Raghava Mudaliar	Independent politician
1957	R. C. Samanna Gounder	Indian National Congress
1962	K. Tirupathy Gounder	Dravida Munnetra Kazhagam
1967	C. K. Chinarasu Gounder	Dravida Munnetra Kazhagam
Tamil Nadu
1971	G. Ramasamy	Dravida Munnetra Kazhagam
1977	B. Sundaram	Dravida Munnetra Kazhagam
1980	B. Sundaram	Dravida Munnetra Kazhagam
1984	Y. Shanmugam	Indian National Congress
1985 (Note: By-Election)	S. P. Manavalan Mudaliar	Indian National Congress
1989	B. Sundaram	Dravida Munnetra Kazhagam
1991	A. K. C. Sundaravel	All India Anna Dravida Munnetra Kazhagam
1996	G. Shanmugam	Dravida Munnetra Kazhagam
2001	T. K. Raja	Pattali Makkal Katchi
2006	T. K. Raja	Pattali Makkal Katchi
2011	K. G. Ramesh	All India Anna Dravida Munnetra Kazhagam
2016	A. Nallathambi	Dravida Munnetra Kazhagam
2021	A. Nallathambi	Dravida Munnetra Kazhagam
2026	Dr. Thirupathi. N	Tamilaga Vettri Kazhagam

== Election results ==
Vote share of winning candidates
2026	51.79%
2021	52.37%
2016	45.43%
2011	55.31%
2006	48.68%
2001	46.15%
1996	53.44%
1991	62.24%
1989	35.92%
1985 by-election	0.0%
1984	49.02%
1980	54.74%
1977	27.29%
1971	55.54%
1967	49.80%
1962	62.38%
1957	64.00%
1952	48.75%

=== 2026 ===
2026 Tamil Nadu Legislative Assembly election: Tiruppattur (Vellore)
Party	Candidate	Votes	%	±%
TVK	Dr. Thirupathi. N	105,098	51.79	New
DMK	A. Nallathambi	56,835	28.01	▼24.36
AMMK	Gnanasekar A.	30,003	14.79	▲13.32
NTK	Arumugam V.	5,482	2.70	▼3.88
TVK	Rajesh S.	486	0.24	New
NOTA	NOTA	464	0.23	▼0.66
Margin of victory		48,263	23.78	▲8.46
Turnout		2,02,925	89.26	▲12.00
Registered electors		2,27,352		▼11,192
TVK gain from DMK		Swing	▲51.79	

=== 2021 ===
2021 Tamil Nadu Legislative Assembly election: Tirupattur (Vellore)
Party	Candidate	Votes	%	±%
DMK	A. Nallathambi	96,522	52.37	+6.94
PMK	T. K. Raja	68,282	37.05	+30.17
NTK	M. Sumathi	12,127	6.58	New
AMMK	A. Gnanasekar	2,702	1.47	New
NOTA	NOTA	1,632	0.89	+0.21
Independent	B. Vijayakumar	1,096	0.59	New
Margin of victory		28,240	15.32	11.02
Turnout		184,298	77.26	−1.80
Rejected ballots		583	0.32	
Registered electors		238,544		
DMK hold		Swing	6.94	

=== 2016 ===
2016 Tamil Nadu Legislative Assembly election: Tirupattur (Vellore)
Party	Candidate	Votes	%	±%
DMK	A. Nallathambi	80,791	45.43	+4.66
AIADMK	T. T. Kumar	73,144	41.13	−14.18
PMK	T. K. Raja	12,227	6.88	New
DMDK	K. Harikrishnan	3,968	2.23	New
BJP	V. Govindarajan	1,831	1.03	+0.3
NOTA	NOTA	1,193	0.67	New
Independent	T. Raja	1,051	0.59	New
Margin of victory		7,647	4.30	−10.24
Turnout		177,843	79.06	−3.33
Registered electors		224,938		
DMK gain from AIADMK		Swing	-9.88	

=== 2011 ===
2011 Tamil Nadu Legislative Assembly election: Tirupattur (Vellore)
Party	Candidate	Votes	%	±%
AIADMK	K. G. Ramesh	82,895	55.31	New
DMK	S. Rajendran	61,103	40.77	New
BJP	M. Selva Kumar	1,087	0.73	−0.78
Independent	D. Kubendiran	1,006	0.67	New
Independent	K. Venkatesan	843	0.56	New
Margin of victory		21,792	14.54	5.24
Turnout		149,869	82.40	12.17
Registered electors		181,888		
AIADMK gain from PMK		Swing	6.63	

=== 2006 ===
2006 Tamil Nadu Legislative Assembly election: Tirupattur (Vellore)
Party	Candidate	Votes	%	±%
PMK	T. K. Raja	71,932	48.68	+2.53
MDMK	K. C. Azhagiri	58,193	39.38	+32.85
DMDK	B. S. Senthilkumar	9,435	6.39	New
BJP	D. Shiva Shanmukam	2,229	1.51	New
Independent	D. N. Amudanandan	1,718	1.16	New
Independent	K. E. Mani	1,297	0.88	New
SP	H. Gopinathan	1,026	0.69	New
BSP	T. R. Saravanan	897	0.61	New
Margin of victory		13,739	9.30	4.86
Turnout		147,764	70.23	7.97
Registered electors		210,399		
PMK hold		Swing	2.53	

=== 2001 ===
2001 Tamil Nadu Legislative Assembly election: Tirupattur (Vellore)
Party	Candidate	Votes	%	±%
PMK	T. K. Raja	59,840	46.15	New
DMK	S. Arasu	54,079	41.70	−11.73
MDMK	K. Annamalai	8,474	6.53	−4.35
Independent	M. Neela	1,730	1.33	New
Independent	M. Thiruvengadam	1,430	1.10	New
MNK(PLP)	G. Ramasamy	1,259	0.97	New
Independent	P. Chinnasamy	1,104	0.85	New
UCPI	M. Chinnaraj	839	0.65	New
Margin of victory		5,761	4.44	−21.11
Turnout		129,674	62.26	−4.42
Registered electors		208,277		
PMK gain from DMK		Swing	-7.29	

=== 1996 ===
1996 Tamil Nadu Legislative Assembly election: Tirupattur (Vellore)
Party	Candidate	Votes	%	±%
DMK	G. Shanmugam	66,207	53.44	+23.39
AIADMK	P. G. Mani	34,549	27.89	−34.36
MDMK	K. C. Alagiri	13,490	10.89	New
AIIC(T)	G. Raju	8,070	6.51	New
Margin of victory		31,658	25.55	−6.65
Turnout		123,897	66.68	3.01
Registered electors		193,029		
DMK gain from AIADMK		Swing	-8.81	

=== 1991 ===
1991 Tamil Nadu Legislative Assembly election: Tirupattur (Vellore)
Party	Candidate	Votes	%	±%
AIADMK	A. K. C. Sundaravel	69,402	62.24	+45.48
DMK	B. Sundaram	33,498	30.04	−5.87
PMK	S. Nataraja	7,137	6.40	New
BJP	A. Anbu	945	0.85	New
Margin of victory		35,904	32.20	20.41
Turnout		111,503	63.67	−9.11
Registered electors		181,330		
AIADMK gain from DMK		Swing	26.33	

=== 1989 ===
1989 Tamil Nadu Legislative Assembly election: Tirupattur (Vellore)
Party	Candidate	Votes	%	±%
DMK	B. Sundaram	40,998	35.92	+5.83
INC	S. P. Manavalan	27,541	24.13	−24.89
AIADMK	P. G. Mani	19,139	16.77	New
Independent	G. Ponnusamy	13,462	11.79	New
Independent	M. Raji Gounder	12,359	10.83	New
Margin of victory		13,457	11.79	−7.14
Turnout		114,148	72.79	−1.33
Registered electors		159,767		
DMK gain from INC		Swing	-13.10	

=== 1984 ===
1984 Tamil Nadu Legislative Assembly election: Tirupattur (Vellore)
Party	Candidate	Votes	%	±%
INC	Y. Shanmugam	46,884	49.02	New
DMK	B. Sundaram	28,781	30.09	−24.65
Independent	G. Ponnusamy	18,196	19.02	New
Independent	M. P. Ponnusamy	1,260	1.32	New
Margin of victory		18,103	18.93	8.56
Turnout		95,649	74.12	10.65
Registered electors		134,589		
INC gain from DMK		Swing	-5.73	

=== 1980 ===
1980 Tamil Nadu Legislative Assembly election: Tirupattur (Vellore)
Party	Candidate	Votes	%	±%
DMK	B. Sundaram	42,786	54.74	+27.45
AIADMK	G. Ramasamy	34,682	44.37	+18.46
Independent	T. V. Raja	690	0.88	New
Margin of victory		8,104	10.37	9.00
Turnout		78,158	63.47	1.05
Registered electors		124,811		
DMK hold		Swing	27.45	

=== 1977 ===
1977 Tamil Nadu Legislative Assembly election: Tirupattur (Vellore)
Party	Candidate	Votes	%	±%
DMK	B. Sundaram	19,855	27.29	−28.25
AIADMK	K. Jayaraman	18,857	25.92	New
INC	T. A. Thatha Chettiar	16,225	22.30	−22.17
JP	N. Damodaran	13,786	18.95	New
Independent	C. Raji	2,194	3.02	New
Independent	T. C. Thangaraj	1,641	2.26	New
Margin of victory		998	1.37	−9.70
Turnout		72,761	62.42	−15.13
Registered electors		118,361		
DMK hold		Swing	-28.25	

=== 1971 ===
1971 Tamil Nadu Legislative Assembly election: Tirupattur (Vellore)
Party	Candidate	Votes	%	±%
DMK	G. Ramasamy	37,120	55.54	+5.74
INC	Y. Shammugan	29,720	44.46	−2.16
Margin of victory		7,400	11.07	7.90
Turnout		66,840	77.55	−4.20
Registered electors		90,778		
DMK hold		Swing	5.74	

=== 1967 ===
1967 Madras Legislative Assembly election: Tirupattur (Vellore)
Party	Candidate	Votes	%	±%
DMK	C. Gounder	32,589	49.80	−12.58
INC	Shunmugam	30,512	46.62	+9
RPI	Murugesan	2,345	3.58	New
Margin of victory		2,077	3.17	−21.59
Turnout		65,446	81.74	15.50
Registered electors		82,816		
DMK hold		Swing	-12.58	

=== 1962 ===
1962 Madras Legislative Assembly election: Tirupattur (Vellore)
Party	Candidate	Votes	%	±%
DMK	K. Thirupathy Gounder	32,400	62.38	New
INC	R. C. Samanna Gounder	19,540	37.62	−26.38
Margin of victory		12,860	24.76	−16.52
Turnout		51,940	66.24	28.28
Registered electors		82,207		
DMK gain from INC		Swing	-1.62	

=== 1957 ===
1957 Madras Legislative Assembly election: Tirupattur (Vellore)
Party	Candidate	Votes	%	±%
INC	R. C. Samanna Gounder	18,618	64.00	+26.94
Independent	Netesa Pillai	6,609	22.72	New
Independent	Krishnasami Lyer	2,112	7.26	New
Independent	Appasami	1,752	6.02	New
Margin of victory		12,009	41.28	29.59
Turnout		29,091	37.95	−17.36
Registered electors		76,648		
INC gain from Independent		Swing	15.25	

=== 1952 ===
1952 Madras Legislative Assembly election: Tirupattur (Vellore)
Party	Candidate	Votes	%	±%
Independent	E. L. Raghava Mudali	20,918	48.75	New
INC	R. C. Samanna Goundar	15,901	37.06	New
Socialist Party (India)	K. C. Appaswami	3,524	8.21	New
KMPP	C. Muniswamy Gounder	2,566	5.98	New
Margin of victory		5,017	11.69	
Turnout		42,909	55.31	
Registered electors		77,579		
Independent win (new seat)				
