= A. Nallathambi (DMK politician) =

Indian politician from DMK

Member of the Tamil Nadu Legislative Assembly
- In office 19 May 2016 – 4 May 2026
- Preceded by: K. G. Ramesh
- Constituency: Tiruppattur, Vellore

Personal details
- Party: Dravida Munnetra Kazhagam
- Occupation: Politician

Annadurai Nallathambi is an Indian politician and a member of the Dravida Munnetra Kazhagam party. He was elected as a member of Tamil Nadu Legislative Assembly from Tiruppattur, Vellore Assembly constituency in May 2021.

== Early life ==
His father's name is A. Annadurai and his educational qualification is BA pass. As of May 2021 he is 45 years old.

== Member of Legislative Assembly ==
He represents the Tiruppattur, Vellore Assembly constituency as Member of Legislative Assembly (MLA) in Tamil Nadu Legislative Assembly.

Committee assignments of 16th Tamil Nadu Assembly

- Member (2021–23) Committee on Privileges

== Electoral performance ==
2021 Tamil Nadu Legislative Assembly election: Tirupattur (Vellore)
Party	Candidate	Votes	%	±%
DMK	A. Nallathambi	96,522	52.37	+6.94
PMK	T. K. Raja	68,282	37.05	+30.17
NTK	M. Sumathi	12,127	6.58	New
AMMK	A. Gnanasekar	2,702	1.47	New
NOTA	NOTA	1,632	0.89	+0.21
Independent	B. Vijayakumar	1,096	0.59	New
Margin of victory		28,240	15.32	11.02
Turnout		184,298	77.26	−1.80
Rejected ballots		583	0.32	
Registered electors		238,544		
DMK hold		Swing	6.94	
