= M. S. K. Bhavani Rajenthiran =

Indian politician

M.S.K. Bhavani Rajenthiran

Member of parliament
- Constituency: Ramanthapuram

Personal details
- Born: 10 December 1954 (age 71) Tirumangalam, Tamil Nadu
- Party: DMK
- Spouse: Late M.S.K. Rajenthiran
- Children: 1 son and 1 daughter
- As of 22 September, 2006

M.S.K. Bhavani Rajenthiran (born 10 December 1954) was a member of the 14th Lok Sabha of India. She was born in Tirumangalam, Madurai to the Tirumangalam'sEx MLA, M. C. A. Rethinasamy Thevar. She represented the Ramanthapuram constituency of Tamil Nadu and is a member of the Dravida Munnetra Kazhagam (DMK) political party.
