= S. Jennifer Chandran =

Indian politician

S. Jennifer Chandran (deceased 6 August 2019) was an Indian politician and was a Member of the Legislative Assembly. She was elected to the Tamil Nadu legislative assembly as a Dravida Munnetra Kazhagam (DMK) candidate from Tiruchendur constituency in the 1996 election.

Chandran served as Minister for Fisheries in the DMK government but lost her seat to Anitha R. Radhakrishnan of the All India Anna Dravida Munnetra Kazhagam (AIADMK) in the 2001 elections.

In August 2002, after the DMK had lost power to the Jayalalithaa-led AIADMK, her house was among those raided by the Directorate of Vigilance and Anti-Corruption in connection with investigations into alleged disproportionate assets held by former ministers and other DMK legislators. The matter appeared to have been dropped after Chandran later switch her party allegiance. She joined the AIADMK in 2004.
