= Latha Athiyaman =

Indian politician

Latha Athiyaman, also spelled Latha Adhiyaman, is an Indian politician who won a by-election in 2009 from the Thirumangalam constituency to become a member of the Tamil Nadu Legislative Assembly. A candidate of the Dravida Munnetra Kazhagam, she heavily defeated her All India Anna Dravida Munnetra Kazhagam rival, M. Muthuramalingam, by nearly 40,000 votes.

Athiyaman is the widow of M. C. S. A. Adhiyaman, another Member of the Legislative Assembly who had worked in the same constituency.
