= R. B. Udhayakumar =

Indian politician

R. B. Udhaya Kumar

9th Deputy Leader of the Opposition in the Tamil Nadu Legislative Assembly
- In office 14 February 2024 – 10 May 2026
- Leader: Edappadi K. Palaniswami
- Preceded by: O. Panneerselvam
- Succeeded by: K. N. Nehru
- Constituency: Thirumangalam

Member of the Tamil Nadu Legislative Assembly
- In office 19 May 2016 – 6 May 2026
- Preceded by: M. Muthuramalingam
- Succeeded by: M. Manimaran
- Constituency: Thirumangalam
- In office 23 May 2011 – 21 May 2016
- Preceded by: K. K. S. S. R. Ramachandran
- Succeeded by: S. G. Subramanian
- Constituency: Sattur

Minister for Revenue in The Government of Tamil Nadu
- In office 19 May 2014 – 6 May 2021
- Chief Minister: J. Jayalalithaa; O. Panneerselvam; Edappadi K. Palaniswami
- Preceded by: B. V. Ramanaa
- Succeeded by: Sattur Ramachandran

Minister for Sports and Youth Welfare
- In office 11 December 2013 – 19 May 2014
- Chief Minister: J. Jayalalithaa
- Preceded by: K. V. Ramalingam
- Succeeded by: S. Sundararaj

Minister for Information Technology
- In office 16 May 2011 – 4 November 2011
- Chief Minister: J. Jayalalithaa
- Preceded by: Poongothai Aladi Aruna
- Succeeded by: K. A. Sengottaiyan

Personal details
- Born: 10 April 1973 (age 53) Madurai, Tamil Nadu, India
- Party: All India Anna Dravida Munnetra Kazhagam

R. B. Udhayakumar is an Indian politician and the Deputy Leader of the Opposition in the Tamil Nadu Legislative Assembly. He is the Member of the Legislative Assembly of Tamil Nadu from Thirumangalam constituency. He belongs to the Thevar community, a socially and politically dominant caste found throughout Central and Southern Tamil Nadu

== Political career ==
Kumar was sacked as Minister for Information Technology in November 2011 as part of the third cabinet reshuffle in a five-month period by Chief Minister Jayalalithaa.

On 17 July 2022, R. B. Udhaya Kumar was elected as the Deputy Leader of the Opposition in Tamil Nadu Legislative Assembly replacing O. Panneerselvam at the AIADMK Legislative Party Meeting. It was formally declared on 19 July 2022. On 14 February 2024, Speaker M. Appavu allotted the seat of the deputy opposition leader to Udhayakumar in the first row of Tamil Nadu Assembly replacing Panneerselvam after the nearly 19 month long demand of the AIADMK.

== Electoral performance ==
=== Tamil Nadu Legislative elections ===
| Elections | Constituency | Party | Result | % Votes |
|---|---|---|---|---|
| 2011 Tamil Nadu Legislative Assembly election | Sattur | ADMK | Won | 58.32% |
| 2016 Tamil Nadu Legislative Assembly election | Thirumangalam | ADMK | Won | 46.99% |
| 2021 Tamil Nadu Legislative Assembly election | Thirumangalam | ADMK | Won | 45.51% |
| 2026 Tamil Nadu Legislative Assembly election | Thirumangalam | ADMK | Lost | % |
