= Katie Wilcox =

American missionary

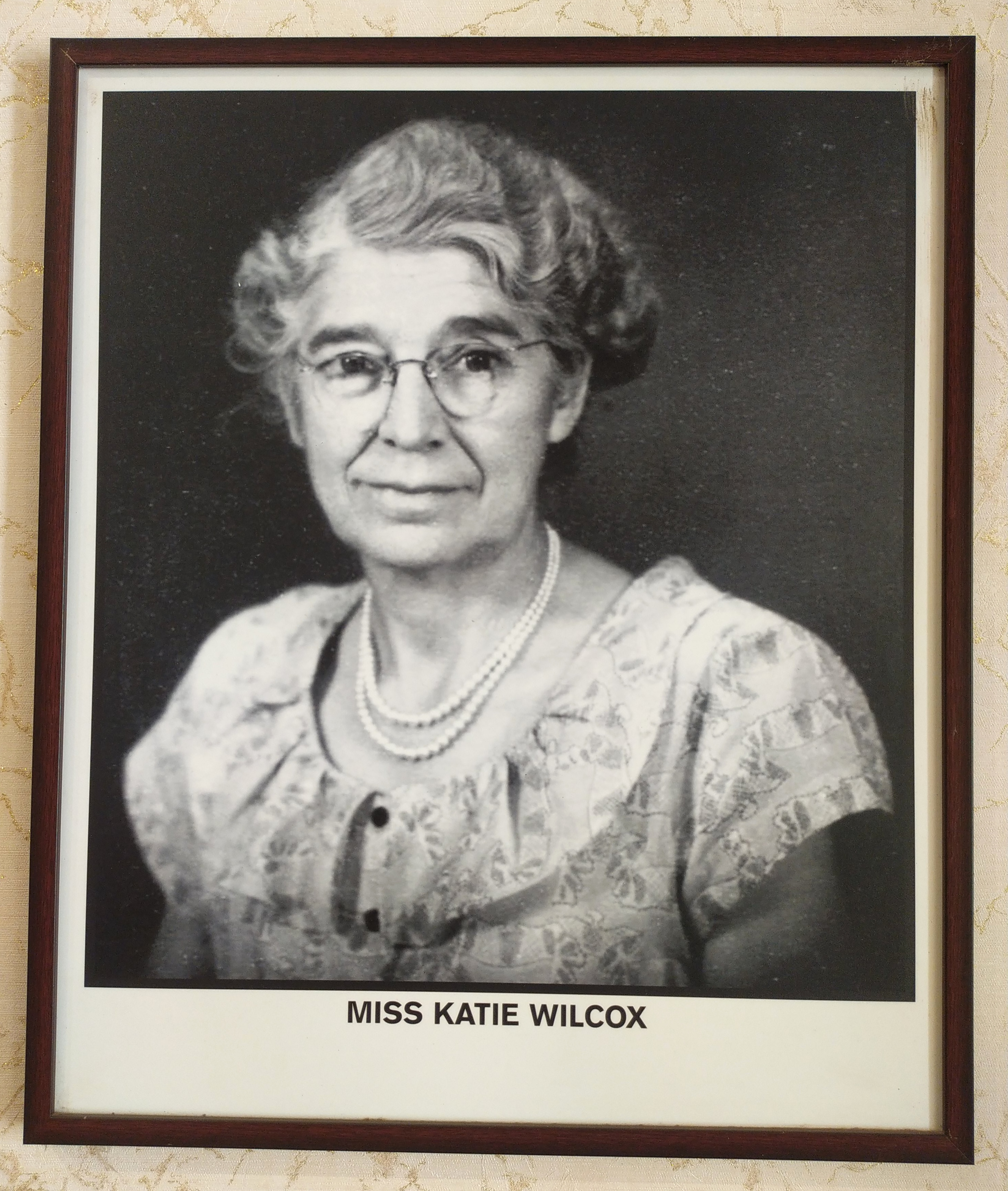
Miss Katie Wilcox

Katie Wilcox (July 26, 1889 – 1974) was an American missionary. She founded the Lady Doak College in Madurai, the first higher education institution exclusively for women there.

She was born on July 26, 1889, and conducted missionary work in India from 1915 to 1958. From 1948 to 1958, she was at the Lady Doak College. She worked as a teacher at the Capron Hall Secondary School in Madurai, with the headmistress Sister Noyes. Wilcox also founded the OCPM School for girls and the Noyes School. After much hard work, she raised funds to build the Lady Doak College in 1948.

Wilcox never married and died in 1974.
