= C. R. Ramachandran =

Indian politician

C. R. Ramachandran is an Indian politician and was a Member of the Legislative Assembly. He was elected to the Tamil Nadu legislative assembly as a Dravida Munnetra Kazhagam (DMK) candidate from Thondamuthur constituency in the 1996 election. because of his father's death he was not able to contribute totally into DMK so was not selected as a candidate in the election of 2001.

The DMK restructured its organisation in Coimbatore district as a consequence of a poor showing in the 2014 general election. As a part of that process, Ramachandran was elected as district secretary for the newly-formed Coimbatore North unit in December 2014.
