= Tiruchendur Assembly constituency =

One of the 234 State Legislative Assembly Constituencies in Tamil Nadu

Coordinates: 8.50°N 78.12°E

Tiruchendur
- Constituency No. 215 for the Tamil Nadu Legislative Assembly
- Area of Tiruchendur State Assembly Constituency

Constituency details
- Country: India
- Region: South India
- State: Tamil Nadu
- District: Thoothukudi
- Lok Sabha constituency: Thoothukkudi
- Established: 1951
- Total electors: 232,933
- Reservation: None

Member of Legislative Assembly
- 17th Tamil Nadu Legislative Assembly
- Incumbent Anitha R. Radhakrishnan
- Party: DMK
- Alliance: SPA
- Elected year: 2026

Tiruchendur is one of the 234 state legislative assembly constituencies in Tamil Nadu in southern India. It is also one of the six state legislative assembly constituencies included in Thoothukkudi Lok Sabha constituency. It is one of the oldest assembly segments in Tamil Nadu, being in existence since independence.

== Members of Legislative Assembly ==
Year	Member	Political party
Madras State
1952	S. P. Adithanar	Kisan Mazdoor Praja Party
1957	M. S. Selvaraj	Indian National Congress
1962	M. S. Selvaraj	Indian National Congress
1967	G. R. Edmund	Dravida Munnetra Kazhagam
Tamil Nadu
1971	G. R. Edmund	Dravida Munnetra Kazhagam
1977	R. Amirtharaj	All India Anna Dravida Munnetra Kazhagam
1980	S. Kesava Adithan	All India Anna Dravida Munnetra Kazhagam
1983 (Note: By-Election)	R. Amirtharaj	All India Anna Dravida Munnetra Kazhagam
1984	Subramani Adithan	All India Anna Dravida Munnetra Kazhagam
1989	K. P. Kandasamy	Dravida Munnetra Kazhagam
1991	A. Chelladurai	All India Anna Dravida Munnetra Kazhagam
1996	S. Jennifer Chandran	Dravida Munnetra Kazhagam
2001	Anitha R. Radhakrishnan	All India Anna Dravida Munnetra Kazhagam
2006	Anitha R. Radhakrishnan	All India Anna Dravida Munnetra Kazhagam
2009 (Note: By-Election)	Anitha R. Radhakrishnan	Dravida Munnetra Kazhagam
2011	Anitha R. Radhakrishnan	Dravida Munnetra Kazhagam
2016	Anitha R. Radhakrishnan	Dravida Munnetra Kazhagam
2021	Anitha R. Radhakrishnan	Dravida Munnetra Kazhagam
2026	Anitha R. Radhakrishnan	Dravida Munnetra Kazhagam

== Election results ==
Vote share of winning candidates
2026	39.09%
2021	50.58%
2016	52.97%
2011	47.07%
2009	67.81%
2006	52.52%
2001	53.01%
1996	59.22%
1991	58.63%
1989	42.48%
1984	50.70%
1983	0%
1980	49.49%
1977	29.13%
1971	53.54%
1967	56.06%
1962	58.00%
1957	63.60%
1952	23.51%

=== 2026 ===
2026 Tamil Nadu Legislative Assembly election: Tiruchendur
Party	Candidate	Votes	%	±%
DMK	Anitha R. Radhakrishnan	72,723	39.09	▼11.49
TVK	J. Murugan	66,851	35.93	New
BJP	K. R. M. Radhakrishnan	34,159	18.36	
NTK	Ophiliya	9,794	5.26	▼3.37
NOTA	NOTA	722	0.39	
Margin of victory		5,872		
Turnout		1,86,052		
Rejected ballots				
Registered electors		230,702		

=== 2021 ===
2021 Tamil Nadu Legislative Assembly election: Tiruchendur
Party	Candidate	Votes	%	±%
DMK	Anitha R. Radhakrishnan	88,274	50.58	▼2.39
AIADMK	M. Radhakrishnan	63,011	36.10	▼1.28
NTK	S. Gloriyan	15,063	8.63	▲7.41
Amma Makkal Munnettra Kazagam	S. Vadamalaipandian	3,766	2.16	New
MNM	M. Jayanthi	1,965	1.13	New
None of the Above	None of the Above	1,054	0.6	▼0.49
Majority		25,263	14.48	▼1.11
Turnout		174,536	71.20	▼2.26
DMK hold		Swing	▼2.39	

=== 2016 ===
2016 Tamil Nadu Legislative Assembly election: Tiruchendur
Party	Candidate	Votes	%	±%
DMK	Anitha R. Radhakrishnan	88,357	52.97%	+5.93
AIADMK	R. Sarathkumar	62,356	37.38%	−9.22
DMDK	S. A. Senthilkumar	6,330	3.79%	New
BJP	V. Jeyaraman	4,289	2.57%	+0.91
NTK	S. Gloriyan	2,041	1.22%	New
NOTA	NOTA	1,814	1.09%	New
Margin of victory		26,001	15.59%	15.15%
Turnout		1,66,808	73.46%	−3.46%
Registered electors		2,27,058		
DMK hold		Swing	5.95%	

=== 2011 ===
2011 Tamil Nadu Legislative Assembly election: Tiruchendur
Party	Candidate	Votes	%	±%
DMK	Anitha R. Radhakrishnan	68,741	47.07	▼20.74
AIADMK	P. R. Manoharan	68,101	46.60	▲21.02
JMM	N. Nattar	3,240	2.22	New
BJP	N. Rameswaran	2,429	1.66	New
BSP	B. Deva Gnana Sigamani	626	0.43	New
IJK	K. Sudalaikannu	534	0.37	New
Majority		640	0.44	▼41.77
Turnout		146,141	76.92	▼1.08
DMK hold		Swing	▼20.74	

=== 2009 by-election ===
2009 Tamil Nadu Legislative Assembly bye-election: Tiruchendur
Party	Candidate	Votes	%	±%
DMK	Anitha R. Radhakrishnan	75,223	67.81	▲27.76
AIADMK	Amman T. Narayanan	28,362	25.57	▼26.95
DMDK	Gomathy R. Ganesan	4,186	3.77	▲0.40
Majority		46,861	42.21	▲29.74
Turnout		110,931	78.00	▲11.10
DMK gain from AIADMK		Swing	▲27.76	

=== 2006 ===
2006 Tamil Nadu Legislative Assembly election: Tiruchendur
Party	Candidate	Votes	%	±%
AIADMK	Anitha R. Radhakrishnan	58,600	52.52	▼0.49
DMK	A. D. K. Jeyaseelan	44,684	40.05	▼1.76
DMDK	A. Ganesan	3,756	3.37	New
BJP	Dr. C. Kannan	1,398	1.26	New
AIFB	S. P. Parisamuthu	430	0.39	New
BSP	V. Kumar	218	0.20	New
Majority		13,916	12.47	▲1.27
Turnout		111,580	66.90	▲14.64
AIADMK hold		Swing	▼0.49	

=== 2001 ===
2001 Tamil Nadu Legislative Assembly election: Tiruchendur
Party	Candidate	Votes	%	±%
AIADMK	Anitha R. Radhakrishnan	52,990	53.01	▲24.83
DMK	S. Jennifer Chandran	41,797	41.81	▼17.41
MDMK	V. P. R. Ramesh	2,662	2.66	▼1.30
Majority		11,193	11.20	▼19.84
Turnout		99,999	52.26	▼4.75
AIADMK gain from DMK		Swing	▲24.83	

=== 1996 ===
1996 Tamil Nadu Legislative Assembly election: Tiruchendur
Party	Candidate	Votes	%	±%
DMK	S. Jennifer Chandran	59,206	59.22	▲29.29
AIADMK	T. Thamotharan	28,175	28.18	▼30.45
BJP	A. N. Rajakkannan	6,967	6.97	▲2.00
MDMK	D. Ramachandran	3,961	3.96	New
PMK	M. Arikrishna Devendrar	348	0.35	New
Majority		31,031	31.04	▲2.34
Turnout		102,925	57.01	▲2.21
DMK gain from AIADMK		Swing	▲29.29	

=== 1991 ===
1991 Tamil Nadu Legislative Assembly election: Tiruchendur
Party	Candidate	Votes	%	±%
AIADMK	A. Chelladurai	54,442	58.63	▲37.34
DMK	A. S. Pandian	27,794	29.93	▼12.55
BJP	K. Poovanam	4,615	4.97	▲3.14
Majority		26,648	28.70	▲11.36
Turnout		94,977	54.80	▼10.43
AIADMK gain from DMK		Swing	▲37.34	

=== 1989 ===
1989 Tamil Nadu Legislative Assembly election: Tiruchendur
Party	Candidate	Votes	%	±%
DMK	K. P. Kandasamy	42,084	42.48	▼5.59
INC	K. Shunmugasundaram Kasimari	24,903	25.14	New
AIADMK	A. Chelladurai	21,095	21.29	▼29.41
AIADMK	Kayal Moulana	7,808	7.88	New
BJP	V. P. Jeyakumar	1,815	1.83	New
Majority		17,181	17.34	▲14.71
Turnout		100,228	65.23	▼1.11
DMK gain from AIADMK		Swing	▼5.59	

=== 1984 ===
1984 Tamil Nadu Legislative Assembly election: Tiruchendur
Party	Candidate	Votes	%	±%
AIADMK	S. R. Subramania Adityan	45,953	50.70	▲1.21
DMK	K. P. Kandasamy	43,565	48.07	▲0.26
Majority		2,388	2.63	▼0.95
Turnout		94,617	66.34	▲11.92
AIADMK hold		Swing	▲1.21	

=== 1980 ===
1980 Tamil Nadu Legislative Assembly election: Tiruchendur
Party	Candidate	Votes	%	±%
AIADMK	S. Kesava Adithan	35,499	49.49	▲20.36
DMK	Samsudin @ Kathiravan	34,294	47.81	▲23.47
Independent	K. Kesavan	948	1.32	New
JP	G. A. T. John Britto	707	0.99	▼26.56
Majority		1,205	1.68	▲0.10
Turnout		72,248	54.42	▲2.57
AIADMK hold		Swing	▲20.36	

=== 1977 ===
1977 Tamil Nadu Legislative Assembly election: Tiruchendur
Party	Candidate	Votes	%	±%
AIADMK	R. Amirtharaj	20,871	29.13	New
JP	Subramaniya Adityan	19,736	27.55	New
DMK	S. Syed Ahmed	17,441	24.34	▼29.20
INC	Raj Victoria	12,477	17.42	New
Majority		1,135	1.58	▼6.36
Turnout		72,302	51.85	▼17.30
AIADMK gain from DMK		Swing	New	

=== 1971 ===
1971 Tamil Nadu Legislative Assembly election: Tiruchendur
Party	Candidate	Votes	%	±%
DMK	Edmund	39,974	53.54	▼2.52
INC(O)	Ganesasundaram	34,045	45.60	New
Majority		5,929	7.94	▼7.13
Turnout		78,350	69.15	▼0.36
DMK hold		Swing	▼2.52	

=== 1967 ===
1967 Madras Legislative Assembly election: Tiruchendur
Party	Candidate	Votes	%	±%
DMK	E. Fernando	39,619	56.06	New
INC	S. Nadar	28,971	40.99	▼17.01
Majority		10,648	15.07	▼2.28
Turnout		73,021	69.51	▲0.43
DMK gain from INC		Swing	New	

=== 1962 ===
1962 Madras Legislative Assembly election: Tiruchendur
Party	Candidate	Votes	%	±%
INC	M. S. Selvaraj	39,944	58.00	▼5.60
Independent	S. P. Adithanar	27,994	40.65	New
Majority		11,950	17.35	▼13.45
Turnout		69,967	69.08	▲21.47
INC hold		Swing	▼5.60	

=== 1957 ===
1957 Madras Legislative Assembly election: Tiruchendur
Party	Candidate	Votes	%	±%
INC	M. S. Selvaraj	30,106	63.60	▲42.62
Independent	M. R. Meganathan	15,529	32.80	New
Majority		14,577	30.80	▲28.27
Turnout		47,340	47.61	▼21.20
INC gain from KMPP		Swing	▲42.62	

=== 1952 ===
1952 Madras Legislative Assembly election: Thiruchendur
Party	Candidate	Votes	%	±%
KMPP	S. T. Adityan	25,030	23.51%	
INC	V. Arumugam (Indian politician)	22,341	20.98%	20.98%
INC	Subramania Adityan	21,224	19.93%	19.93%
Socialist Party (India)	Pitchu	9,177	8.62%	
Independent	Shanmugham	4,850	4.56%	
Independent	G. E. Muthu	4,791	4.50%	
Independent	Muthiah	4,691	4.41%	
Independent	Annal Jabaaith	3,886	3.65%	
Independent	V. Alagappan	3,127	2.94%	
Independent	Seeni Kudumben	2,696	2.53%	
Independent	N. Velunarayanan	1,834	1.72%	
Margin of victory		2,689	2.53%	
Turnout		1,06,475	68.81%	
Registered electors		1,54,748		
KMPP win (new seat)				
