= E. Fernando =

Indian politician

Member of the Tamil Nadu Legislative Assembly
- In office 1962–1967
- Preceded by: S. P. Adithanar
- Constituency: Tiruchendur

Personal details
- Party: Dravida Munnetra Kazhagam

E. Fernando was an Indian politician and former Member of the Legislative Assembly. He was elected to the Tamil Nadu legislative assembly as a Dravida Munnetra Kazhagam candidate from Tiruchendur constituency in the 1967 election.
