= Edmund (Tiruchendur MLA) =

Indian politician

Edmund was an Indian politician and former Member of the Legislative Assembly. He was elected to the Tamil Nadu legislative assembly as a Dravida Munnetra Kazhagam candidate from Tiruchendur constituency in the 1971 election.
