= K. G. Ramesh =

Indian politician

K. G. Ramesh was an Indian politician and a former member of the 14th Tamil Nadu Legislative Assembly from the Tiruppattur constituency. He represented the All India Anna Dravida Munnetra Kazhagam party.

The elections of 2016 resulted in his constituency being won by A. Nallathambi.
