= R. Amirtharaj =

Indian politician

R. Amritharaj (ta: ஆ. அமிர்தராஜ்) was an Indian politician and former Member of the Legislative Assembly. He was elected to the Tamil Nadu legislative assembly as an Anna Dravida Munnetra Kazhagam candidate from Tiruchendur constituency in 1977 election.
