= M. Chinnaraj =

Indian politician

Member, Tamil Nadu Legislative Assembly
- In office 1980–1984
- Preceded by: K. Maruthachalam
- Succeeded by: C. Aranganayagam
- Constituency: Thondamuthur
- In office 1985–1989
- Preceded by: S. Palanisamy
- Succeeded by: V. Gopalakrishnan
- Constituency: Mettupalayam

Personal details
- Born: 25 May 1946 Veerapandi
- Party: All India Anna Dravida Munnetra Kazhagam
- Children: 3
- Education: Government Arts College, Coimbatore; Dr. Ambedkar Government Law College, Chennai
- Profession: Advocate

M. Chinnaraj is an Indian politician and a former member of the Tamil Nadu Legislative Assembly. He is from Veerapandi village in the Coimbatore district. He attended Chinna Thadagam Government High School for his schooling. Chinnaraj completed his undergraduate degree at Coimbatore Government Arts College and his Bachelor of Law at Government Law College, Chennai. A member of the All India Anna Dravida Munnetra Kazhagam, he contested and won the 1980 Tamil Nadu Legislative Assembly election from the Thondamuthur constituency, becoming a Member of the Legislative Assembly. Later he contested in the 1985 Tamil Nadu Legislative Assembly election from the Thondamuthur constituency successfully at second time.

== Electoral performance ==
=== 1980 ===
1980 Tamil Nadu Legislative Assembly election: Thondamuthur
Party	Candidate	Votes	%	±%
AIADMK	M. Chinnaraj	57,822	57.54	+24.25
DMK	R. Manickkavachagam	42,673	42.46	+17.05
Margin of victory		15,149	15.07	7.20
Turnout		100,495	61.60	2.79
Registered electors		165,819		
AIADMK hold		Swing	24.25	

=== 1984 ===
1984 Tamil Nadu Legislative Assembly election: Mettupalayam
Party	Candidate	Votes	%	±%
AIADMK	M. Chinnaraj	61,951	59.60%	+0.63
DMK	M. Mathiyan	41,527	39.95%	New
Margin of victory		20,424	19.65%	0.16%
Turnout		103,952	76.28%	16.96%
Registered electors		142,909		
AIADMK hold		Swing	0.63%	
