= M. S. Selvaraj =

Indian politician

M. S. Selvaraj was an Indian politician and former Member of the Legislative Assembly. He was elected to the Tamil Nadu legislative assembly as an Indian National Congress candidate from Tiruchendur constituency in 1957 and 1962 elections.
