= V. Arumugam (Indian politician) =

Indian politician

- Occupation: Politician

V. Arumugam was an Indian politician and former Member of the Legislative Assembly. He was elected to the Tamil Nadu legislative assembly as an Indian National Congress candidate from Tiruchendur constituency in 1952 election. He was one of the two elected members from that constituency, the other being S. P. Adithanar from Kisan Mazdoor Praja Party.
