= Veera Elavarasu =

Indian politician

Veera Elavarasu, also spelled Veera Ilavarasan, was an Indian politician and a member of the Tamil Nadu Legislative Assembly. He was elected as a Marumalarchi Dravida Munnetra Kazhagam (MDMK) candidate for the Thirumangalam constituency. He died in November 2008.
