= P. T. Saraswathy =

Indian politician (1935–2009)

Member of the Tamil Nadu Legislative Assembly
- In office 1977–1980
- Constituency: Thirumangalam

Personal details
- Born: Pearline Thangam Saraswathy; 13 March 1935 Cheranmadevi, British Raj
- Died: May 2009 (aged 74) Chennai, Tamil Nadu, India
- Party: All India Anna Dravida Munnetra Kazhagam
- Education: Lady Doak College (BA); Madras Christian College (LL.B)

P. T. Saraswathy (1935–2009) was a politician of the Anna Dravida Munnetra Kazhagam in Tamil Nadu. She served as the Minister of Social Welfare in MG Ramachandran's cabinet.

== Early life ==
Born at Cheranmadevi in Tirunelveli district on 13 March 1935, P. T. Saraswathy attended the Lady Doak College, Madurai, from where she received her Bachelor of Arts degree. Later she did a law course at the Madras Christian College.

== Career ==
Saraswathy was a secretary of the All India Anna Dravida Munnetra Kazhagam (AIADMK) and contested the 1977 Tamil Nadu Legislative Assembly election from Tirumangalam constituency. She defeated the Indian National Congress's candidate and was elected to the Sixth Assembly of Tamil Nadu. Chief Minister MG Ramachandran appointed her the Minister of Social Welfare in his cabinet. She was a legal advisor to Foundation for Innovative Case work On Education Economy & Environment.

== Personal life ==
Saraswathy died at her residence in Chennai in May 2009. Her body was discovered only when her neighbours called the police after noticing that her house had been locked for several days.
