= G. Shanmugam =

Indian politician

G. Shanmugam was an Indian politician and was a Member of the Legislative Assembly. He was elected to the Tamil Nadu legislative assembly as a Dravida Munnetra Kazhagam (DMK) candidate from Tiruppattur (41) constituency in the 1996 election.
