= Thondamuthur Assembly constituency =

One of the 234 State Legislative Assembly Constituencies in Tamil Nadu, in India

Coordinates: 11°00′35″N 76°49′41″E

Thondamuthur
- Constituency No. 119 for the Tamil Nadu Legislative Assembly

Constituency details
- Country: India
- Region: South India
- State: Tamil Nadu
- District: Coimbatore
- Lok Sabha constituency: Pollachi
- Established: 1951
- Total electors: 2,93,379
- Reservation: None

Member of Legislative Assembly
- 17th Tamil Nadu Legislative Assembly
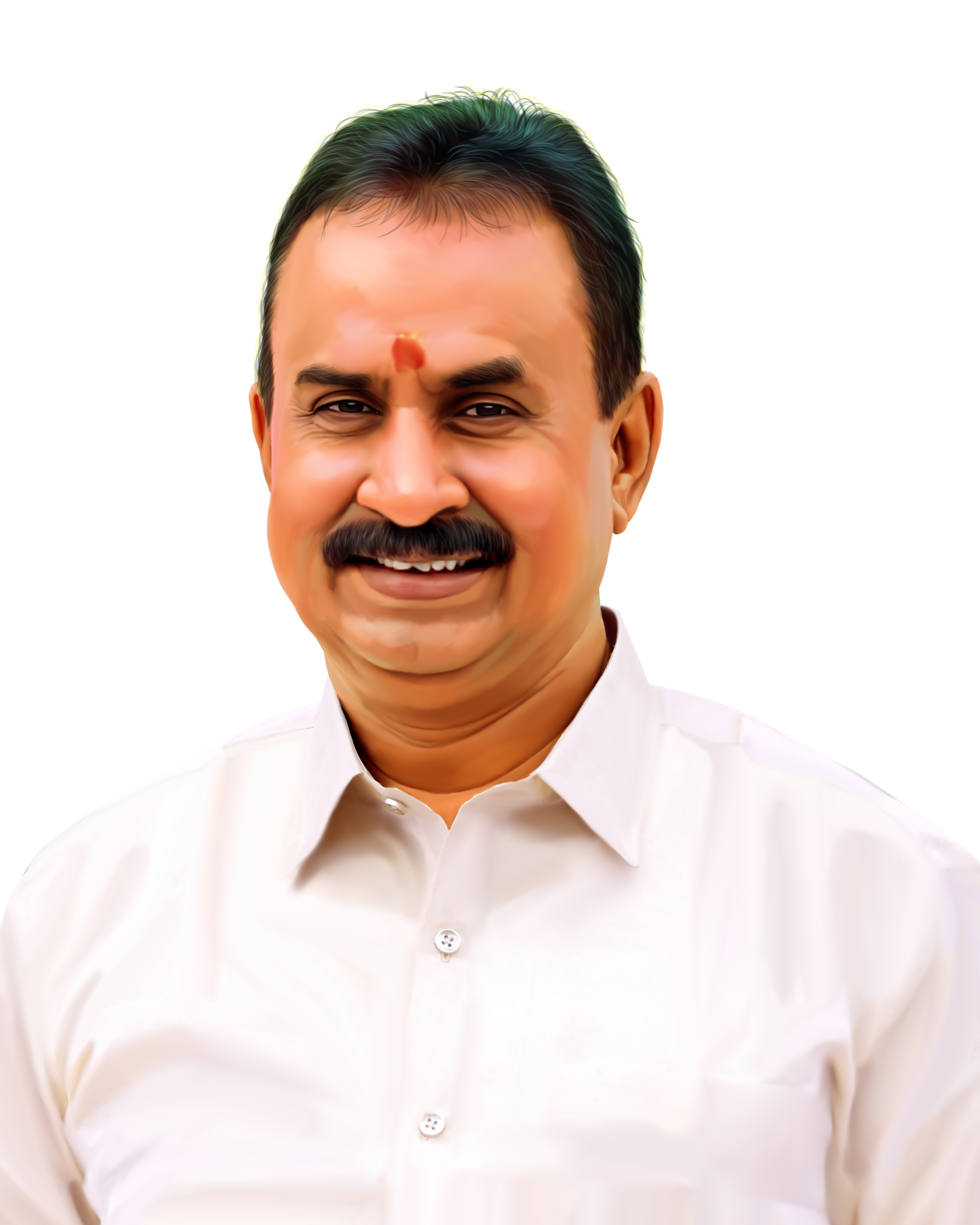
- Incumbent S. P. Velumani
- Party: AIADMK
- Alliance: NDA
- Elected year: 2026

Thondamuthur is a legislative assembly in Coimbatore district in Tamil Nadu, which includes the town of Thondamuthur. Its State Assembly Constituency number is 119. Thondamuthur Assembly constituency is part of Pollachi Lok Sabha constituency. It was a part of Nilgiris Lok Sabha constituency until the 2008 delimitation. An election was not held in the year 1957. It is one of the 234 State Legislative Assembly Constituencies in Tamil Nadu, in India.

== Bifurcation ==
The existing Thondamuthur Assembly constituency was bifurcated in 2008 to create a new constituency - Kavundampalayam. Some parts of Perur Assembly constituency were added to Thondamuthur after the disestablishment of Perur constituency.

== Members of Legislative Assembly ==
=== Madras State ===
Year	Winner	Party
1952	Palanisami Gounder	Indian National Congress
1962	V. Ellama Naidu	Indian National Congress
1967	R. Manickavasakam	Dravida Munnetra Kazhagam

=== Tamil Nadu ===
Election	Winner	Party
1971	R. Manickavasakam	Dravida Munnetra Kazhagam
1977	K. Maruthachalam	All India Anna Dravida Munnetra Kazhagam
1980	Chinnaraj	All India Anna Dravida Munnetra Kazhagam
1984	C. Aranganayagam	All India Anna Dravida Munnetra Kazhagam
1989	U. K. Vellingiri	Communist Party of India (Marxist)
1991	C. Aranganayagam	All India Anna Dravida Munnetra Kazhagam
1996	C. R. Ramachandran	Dravida Munnetra Kazhagam
2001	S. R. Balasubramoniyan	Tamil Maanila Congress
2006	M. Kannappan	Marumalarchi Dravida Munnetra Kazhagam
2009^	M. N. Kandaswamy	Indian National Congress
2011	S. P. Velumani	All India Anna Dravida Munnetra Kazhagam
2016	S. P. Velumani	All India Anna Dravida Munnetra Kazhagam
2021	S. P. Velumani	All India Anna Dravida Munnetra Kazhagam
2026	S. P. Velumani	All India Anna Dravida Munnetra Kazhagam

== Election results ==
Vote share of winning candidates
2026	36.09%
2021	53.89%
2016	55.01%
2011	62.40%
2009 by-election	56.61%
2006	41.60%
2001	50.57%
1996	60.23%
1991	61.95%
1989	42.05%
1984	57.48%
1980	57.54%
1977	33.29%
1971	60.30%
1967	59.14%
1962	52.67%
1952	51.19%

=== 2026 ===
2026 Tamil Nadu Legislative Assembly election: Thondamuthur
Party	Candidate	Votes	%	±%
AIADMK	S. P. Velumani	93,316	36.09	▼17.80
TVK	K. P. R. Sathish	78,591	30.40	New
DMK	N. R. Karthikeyan	75,917	29.36	▼6.47
NTK	Rajabu Nisha	6,976	2.70	▼0.79
NOTA	None of the above	1,000	0.39	▼0.32
Margin of victory		14,725	5.69	▼12.37
Turnout		2,26,109	76.13	▲5.59
Registered electors		2,93,379		▼33,449
AIADMK hold		Swing	▼17.80	

=== 2021 ===
2021 Tamil Nadu Legislative Assembly election: Thondamuthur
Party	Candidate	Votes	%	±%
AIADMK	S. P. Velumani	124,225	53.89	−1.12
DMK	Karthikeya	82,595	35.83	New
MNM	S. Shajahan	11,606	5.03	New
NTK	S. Kalaiarasi	8,042	3.49	+2.28
NOTA	NOTA	1,635	0.71	−0.92
AMMK	R. Sathishkumar	1,235	0.54	New
Margin of victory		41,630	18.06	−14.11
Turnout		230,531	70.54	3.58
Rejected ballots		883	0.38	
Registered electors		326,828		
AIADMK hold		Swing	-1.12	

=== 2016 ===
2016 Tamil Nadu Legislative Assembly election: Thondamuthur
Party	Candidate	Votes	%	±%
AIADMK	S. P. Velumani	109,519	55.01	−7.39
MNMK	Kovai Syed Mohammed M. A.	45,478	22.84	New
BJP	M. Karumuthu Thiyagarajan	19,043	9.56	+6.08
DMDK	K. Thiyagarajan	7,968	4.00	New
SDPI	A. Anshar Sheriff	3,643	1.83	−0.99
NOTA	NOTA	3,248	1.63	New
KMDK	S. R. Vairavel	3,005	1.51	New
NTK	R. Anandharaj	2,408	1.21	New
PMK	Vidiyal Jaganathan	1,315	0.66	New
Margin of victory		64,041	32.17	−1.07
Turnout		199,100	66.96	−8.14
Registered electors		297,360		
AIADMK hold		Swing	-7.39	

=== 2011 ===
2011 Tamil Nadu Legislative Assembly election: Thondamuthur
Party	Candidate	Votes	%	±%
AIADMK	S. P. Velumani	99,886	62.40	+62.40
INC	Kandaswamy M N	46,683	29.16	+29.16
BJP	Shridhar Murthy A	5,581	3.49	−1.00
SDPI	Ummar Kathap T M	4,519	2.82	+2.82
LSP	Kannammal Jagadeesan	932	0.58	+0.58
Margin of victory		53,203	33.24	−2.23
Turnout		1,60,248	75.17	+16.12
AIADMK gain from INC		Swing		

=== 2009 ===
2009–10 Tamil Nadu Legislative Assembly by-elections: Thondamuthur
Party	Candidate	Votes	%	±%
INC	M. N. Kandaswamy	112,350	56.61	
DMDK	K. Thangavelu	40,863	20.59	
Majority		71,487	36.02	
Turnout		198,461		
INC gain from MDMK		Swing		

=== 2006 ===
2006 Tamil Nadu Legislative Assembly election: Thondamuthur
Party	Candidate	Votes	%	±%
MDMK	M. Kannappan	123,490	41.60	+32.59
INC	S. R. Balasubramoniyan	113,596	38.27	New
DMDK	E. Dennis Kovil Pillai	37,901	12.77	New
BJP	M. Chinnaraj	13,545	4.56	New
Independent	K. Varadharajan	2,035	0.69	New
Margin of victory		9,894	3.33	−11.55
Turnout		296,863	70.65	16.93
Registered electors		420,186		
MDMK gain from TMC(M)		Swing	-8.97	

=== 2001 ===
2001 Tamil Nadu Legislative Assembly election: Thondamuthur
Party	Candidate	Votes	%	±%
TMC(M)	S. R. Balasubramoniyan	96,959	50.57	New
DMK	V. R. Sukanya	68,423	35.68	−24.55
MDMK	M. Krishnaswamy	17,282	9.01	New
Independent	N. R. Harikumar	5,209	2.72	New
Democratic Forward Bloc	A. R. Sakthivel	1,442	0.75	New
Margin of victory		28,536	14.88	−18.23
Turnout		191,745	53.72	−11.41
Registered electors		356,986		
TMC(M) gain from DMK		Swing	-9.66	

=== 1996 ===
1996 Tamil Nadu Legislative Assembly election: Thondamuthur
Party	Candidate	Votes	%	±%
DMK	C. R. Ramachandran	113,025	60.23	New
AIADMK	T. Malaravan	50,888	27.12	−34.84
CPI(M)	U. K. Vellingiri	12,815	6.83	−23.5
BJP	K. C. Krishnamurthi	6,948	3.70	−2.05
Margin of victory		62,137	33.11	1.49
Turnout		187,656	65.13	5.91
Registered electors		300,961		
DMK gain from AIADMK		Swing	-1.72	

=== 1991 ===
1991 Tamil Nadu Legislative Assembly election: Thondamuthur
Party	Candidate	Votes	%	±%
AIADMK	C. Aranganayagam	92,362	61.95	+34.48
CPI(M)	U. K. Vellingiri	45,218	30.33	−11.72
BJP	M. Venkatachalam	8,571	5.75	New
JP	S. Ayyaswamy	1,023	0.69	New
Margin of victory		47,144	31.62	17.04
Turnout		149,081	59.22	−63.98
Registered electors		260,841		
AIADMK gain from CPI(M)		Swing	19.90	

=== 1989 ===
1989 Tamil Nadu Legislative Assembly election: Thondamuthur
Party	Candidate	Votes	%	±%
CPI(M)	U. K. Vellingiri	62,305	42.05	+3.53
AIADMK	P. Shanmugam	40,702	27.47	−30.01
AIADMK	M. Chinnaraj	27,522	18.57	−38.9
Independent	P. Swaminathan	13,205	8.91	New
Independent	N. Gopalasamy	782	0.53	New
Margin of victory		21,603	14.58	−4.38
Turnout		148,168	123.20	51.83
Registered electors		123,266		
CPI(M) gain from AIADMK		Swing	-15.43	

=== 1984 ===
1984 Tamil Nadu Legislative Assembly election: Thondamuthur
Party	Candidate	Votes	%	±%
AIADMK	Aranganayakam	67,679	57.48	−0.06
CPI(M)	U. K. Vellingiri	45,353	38.52	New
Independent	B. K. Ananda Kumar	1,004	0.85	New
Independent	S. Manohar	877	0.74	New
Independent	N. Soundararajan	804	0.68	New
Margin of victory		22,326	18.96	3.89
Turnout		117,744	71.38	9.78
Registered electors		173,480		
AIADMK hold		Swing	-0.06	

=== 1980 ===
1980 Tamil Nadu Legislative Assembly election: Thondamuthur
Party	Candidate	Votes	%	±%
AIADMK	Chinnaraj	57,822	57.54	+24.25
DMK	R. Manickkavachagam	42,673	42.46	+17.05
Margin of victory		15,149	15.07	7.20
Turnout		100,495	61.60	2.79
Registered electors		165,819		
AIADMK hold		Swing	24.25	

=== 1977 ===
1977 Tamil Nadu Legislative Assembly election: Thondamuthur
Party	Candidate	Votes	%	±%
AIADMK	K. Maruthachalam	31,690	33.29	New
DMK	R. Manickavachagam	24,195	25.41	−34.89
JP	V. K. Lakshmanan	22,579	23.72	New
INC	T. M. Palanisamy	15,865	16.66	New
RPI	K. Kalinga Gounder	559	0.59	New
Margin of victory		7,495	7.87	−17.45
Turnout		95,207	58.81	−17.47
Registered electors		164,344		
AIADMK gain from DMK		Swing	-27.02	

=== 1971 ===
1971 Tamil Nadu Legislative Assembly election: Thondamuthur
Party	Candidate	Votes	%	±%
DMK	R. Manickavasakam	51,181	60.30	+1.16
Independent	M. Nataraj	29,689	34.98	New
Independent	K. Rengaswamy Allas Raju	4,003	4.72	New
Margin of victory		21,492	25.32	3.74
Turnout		84,873	76.28	1.42
Registered electors		118,619		
DMK hold		Swing	1.16	

=== 1967 ===
1967 Madras Legislative Assembly election: Thondamuthur
Party	Candidate	Votes	%	±%
DMK	R. Manickavachakam	42,261	59.14	+49.34
INC	V. E. Naidu	26,842	37.56	−15.11
Independent	R. K. Gounder	2,354	3.29	New
Margin of victory		15,419	21.58	−10.47
Turnout		71,457	74.86	−4.20
Registered electors		101,232		
DMK gain from INC		Swing	6.47	

=== 1962 ===
1962 Madras Legislative Assembly election: Thondamuthur
Party	Candidate	Votes	%	±%
INC	V. Ellama Naidu	32,520	52.67	New
CPI	L. Arputhasamy	12,735	20.63	New
SWA	V. R. Ponnusamy Gounder	6,725	10.89	New
DMK	K. Meyyappan	6,054	9.81	New
Independent	N. Subbian	2,225	3.60	New
Socialist Party (India)	M. Ramalingam	1,485	2.41	New
Margin of victory		19,785	32.04	
Turnout		61,744	79.06	
Registered electors		81,201		
INC win (new seat)				

=== 1952 ===
1952 Madras Legislative Assembly election: Thondamuthur
Party	Candidate	Votes	%	±%
INC	Palaniswani Gounder	22,814	51.19	New
Socialist Party (India)	Perumal	10,894	24.45	New
KMPP	Ammasai Gounder	6,895	15.47	New
Independent	Palaniappa Gounder	3,961	8.89	New
Margin of victory		11,920	26.75	
Turnout		44,564	64.28	
Registered electors		69,328		
INC win (new seat)				
