= T. K. Raja =

Indian politician

T. K. Raja is an Indian politician and incumbent Member of the Legislative Assembly of Tamil Nadu. He was elected to the Tamil Nadu legislative assembly from Tiruppattur constituency as a Pattali Makkal Katchi candidate in 2001, and 2006 elections. He is the uncle of International Leader Mrs. Kavitha Dhandapani
