= S. Kesava Adithan =

Indian politician

S.Kesava Adithan எஸ்.கேசவ ஆதித்தன்

M.L.A (1980)
- In office 1980 – 26 November 1982
- Constituency: Tiruchendur

Personal details
- Born: 8 November 1933 Kayamozhi, Tamil Nadu
- Died: 26 November 1982 (aged 49)
- Party: ADMK (formerly in DMK)
- Spouse: Mrs. Senthamarai
- Children: Saratha (Daughter); Premalatha (Daughter); Brindha (Daughter); Susaritha (Daughter); Chokkalinga Kumarasa Adithan (Son); Thanikesa Adithan (Son)

S. Kesava Adithan (born 8 November 1933) was an Indian politician and former Member of the Legislative Assembly. He was elected to the Tamil Nadu legislative assembly as an Anna Dravida Munnetra Kazhagam candidate from Tiruchendur constituency in 1980 election.

== Political career ==
He was elected to the Tamil Nadu legislative assembly as an Anna Dravida Munnetra Kazhagam candidate from Tiruchendur constituency in 1980 election.

== Personal life ==
Kesava Adithan was born to Mrs. Chinna Thangam and Mr. T. S. Sivanthi Adithan (Postmaster), on 8 November 1933 at Kayamozhi, Tamil Nadu, India. He is the eldest and had two younger brothers.

Having completed his schooling in Nazareth he did a PUC in St Johns College, Tirunelveli, and started his political career at the age of 16 in DMK then later joined with ADMK along with M. G. Ramachandran (MGR).

He was married to Senthamarai Devi of Mavadipannai in January 1956 at the age of 23.

He had four daughters namely Saratha, Premalatha, Brindha, Susaritha and two sons namely Chokkalinga Kumarasa Adithan and Thanikesa Adithan.

He died in a car accident on 26 November 1982.
