= M. Muthuramalingam =

Indian politician

M. Muthuramalingam (born 7 August 1963) is an Indian politician and was a member of the Tamil Nadu Legislative Assembly from the Thirumangalam constituency between 1996-2000 and 2011–2016.

== Career ==
M.Muthuramalingam was elected to the Thirumangalam constituency of the Tamil Nadu Legislative Assembly in the 1996 elections. He had been elected as a member of the Dravida Munnetra Kazhagam (DMK) but left that party in favour of the All India Anna Dravida Munnetra Kazhagam (AIADMK) on 27 June 2000, claiming that the DMK had become the "family property" of its leader, Karunanidhi. He was disqualified from the Assembly with effect from the same day.

In the 2011 state assembly elections, Muthuramalingam, representing the AIADMK, was again elected from Thirumangalam. He had previously contested a by-election there in January 2009, when he lost heavily to Latha Athiyaman of the DMK.

Muthuramalingam was district secretary of the AIADMK for Madurai rural district until February 2017, when he was one of 20 AIADMK members expelled from the party by V. K. Sasikala as he had given huge support to OPS who was out from the party and against Sasikala Family.

== Personal life ==
M. Muthuramalingam was born on 7 August 1963 in K VeppangKulam near Kamuthi, and he is married with five children. His son Karna Muthuramalingam was 59th Ward secretary at Madurai AIADMK.
