= N. S. V. Chitthan =

Indian politician

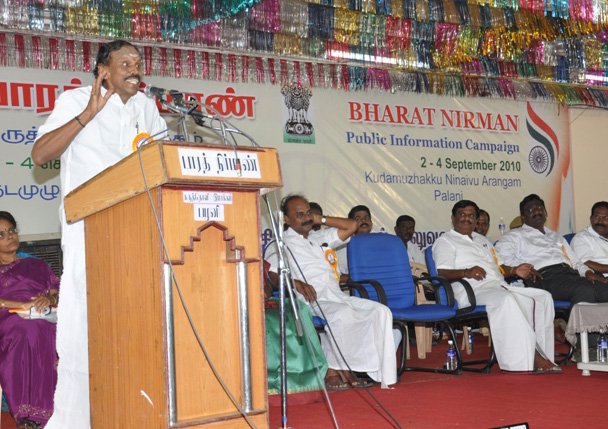
- N.S.V. Chitthan addressing the Bharat Nirman Public Information Campaign, at Palani

Member of Parliament, Lok Sabha
- In office 16 May 2004 – 18 May 2014
- Constituency: Dindigul
- In office May 1996 – March 1998
- Constituency: Dindigul

Member of the Tamil Nadu legislative Assembly
- In office 1980–1989
- Constituency: Thirumangalam
- In office 1967–1971
- Constituency: Thirumangalam

Personal details
- Born: 12 April 1934 (age 92) Thirumangalam, Madras Presidency, British India
- Party: Tamil Maanila Congress
- Other political affiliations: Indian National Congress; Indian National Congress (O)
- Spouse: Shakuntala Chitthan

N. S. Veerapathira Chitthan is an Indian politician of the Tamil Maanila Congress party.

== Early life and background ==
N.S.V. Chitthan was born in Tirumangalam district of Madurai on 12 April 1934. He belongs to the strong Thevar community. His father Shri N. S. Veerapathira Thevar was a member of Congress during the Pre Independence period. He married Shakuntala in 1959. He holds a B.A. in (Economics) and studied at Madura College in Madurai, Tamil Nadu.

== Entry into politics ==
Chithan joined Congress when he was young and contested the elections in 1967 when DMK routed Congress and managed to win even though he was contesting the elections for the first time and given the fact that there was a wave in favour of DMK.

=== Political base ===
Chithan contests from the Dindigul Parliamentary constituency. He has not been a Minister in the Union Government but has served on different committees and has been attributed to the Development of Madurai suburban localities and the transition of Road networks and Industries in Dindigul district and Madurai District.

== Political timeline ==
- Elected to the Tamil Nadu Legislative Assembly (three times) (1967–71 and 1980–89).
- Deputy Leader of Opposition and Deputy Leader
- Congress Legislative Party Chairman, Public Accounts Committee, Tamil Nadu Legislative Assembly (1980–84)
- Elected to 11th Lok Sabha (1996)
- Leader, Tamil Manila Congress (TMC) Party in Lok Sabha (1996–97)
- Re-elected to 14th Lok Sabha (2nd term) (2004) and Member, Committee on Transport, Tourism and Culture Member,
- Re-elected to 15th Lok Sabha (3rd term) (2009) and Member, Committee on Personnel, Public Grievances, Law and Justice (31 August 2009)

== Electoral performance ==
=== Tamil Nadu Assembly elections ===
| Year | Constituency | Party | Result | Votes | % |
|---|---|---|---|---|---|
| 1967 | Tirumangalam | INC | Won | 20,319 | 33.58% |
| 1971 | Tirumangalam | INC | Lost | 27,548 | 43.03% |
| 1977 | Tirumangalam | INC | Lost | 27,720 | 41.63% |
| 1980 | Tirumangalam | INC | Won | 35,181 | 46.43% |
| 1984 | Tirumangalam | INC | Won | 46,146 | 55.23% |
| 1989 | Tirumangalam | INC | Lost | 29,378 | 30.61% |

== Honours ==
Recipient of Silver Medal by Bureau of Parliamentary Affairs for raising maximum number (more than 7000) of questions on the floor of the Tamil Nadu Legislative Assembly during 1967-71. He also addressed the UN General Assembly in 1997 as member of the Indian delegation. He also served as the General Secretary of Tamil Nadu Congress Committee for 2 years.
