= Anitha R. Radhakrishnan =

Indian politician

Minister for Fisheries, Fishermen Welfare, and Animal Husbandry
- In office 7 May 2021 – 5 May 2026
- Chief minister: M. K. Stalin
- Preceded by: D. Jayakumar

Minister for Housing and Urban Development
- In office 9 November 2002 – 12 May 2006

Member of Tamil Nadu legislative assembly for Tiruchendur
- Incumbent
- Assumed office 19 May 2001

Personal details
- Born: Radhakrishnan; 19 September 1951 (age 74) Thandupathu, Udangudi, Thoothukudi, Tamil Nadu, India
- Party: Dravida Munnetra Kazhagam
- Other political affiliations: All India Anna Dravida Munnetra Kazhagam

R. Radhakrishnan is an Indian politician, Minister of Tamil Nadu and Member of the Tamil Nadu Legislative Assembly elected from Tiruchendur constituency as AIADMK candidate in 2001, 2006 and as DMK candidate in 2009 (By-election), 2011, 2016 and 2021. He was also former Minister for Animal Husbandry and Minister for Housing & Urban Development in the 2001 AIADMK government.

== Political career ==
Radhakrishnan has served as a Minister of Tamil Nadu and Member of the Tamil Nadu Legislative Assembly elected from Tiruchendur constituency as AIADMK candidate in 2001, 2006 and as DMK candidate in 2009 (By-election), 2011, 2016 and 2021. He was also former Minister for Animal Husbandry and Minister for Housing & Urban Development in the 2001 AIADMK government.

He was a member of the Anna Dravida Munnetra Kazhagam party in Tamil Nadu until being expelled for alleged anti-party activities on 30 July 2009 and resigned from his MLA Post after being expelled from AIADMK. After his expulsion from the AIADMK, Radhakrishnan accepted an invitation to join the Dravida Munnetra Kazhagam in 2009.

In the 2009 By-election, he again contested as a DMK Candidate and won in the Tiruchendur constituency.

Even though there was an anti-incumbency wave against the DMK, he won the 2011 Assembly election in Tiruchendur constituency.

On 14 May 2015, Radhakrishnan was suspended by the DMK after he and A. Soundara Pandian greeted AIADMK leader Jayalalithaa after she was acquitted in the disproportionate asset case against her.

In the elections of 2016, Radhakrishnan won again in Tiruchendur, beating Sarath Kumar of the AISMK.

In the 2021 assembly election, he again won from Tiruchendur constituency and he was appointed Minister for Fisheries – Fishermen Welfare and Animal Husbandry.

== Electoral performance ==
=== Tamil Nadu Legislative Assembly Election ===
| Elections | Constituency | Party | Result | Vote percentage | Opposition candidate | Opposition party | Opposition vote percentage |
|---|---|---|---|---|---|---|---|
| 2001 Tamil Nadu Legislative Assembly election | Tiruchendur | AIADMK | Won | 54.30 | S. Jennifer Chandran | DMK | 41.81 |
| 2006 Tamil Nadu Legislative Assembly election | Tiruchendur | AIADMK | Won | 52.52 | A. D. K. Jeyaseelan | DMK | 40.05 |
| 2009 Tamil Nadu Legislative Assembly by-election | Tiruchendur | DMK | Won | 67.81 | Amman T. Narayanan | AIADMK | 25.57 |
| 2011 Tamil Nadu Legislative Assembly election | Tiruchendur | DMK | Won | 47.07 | P. R. Manoharan | AIADMK | 46.60 |
| 2016 Tamil Nadu Legislative Assembly election | Tiruchendur | DMK | Won | 52.97 | R. Sarathkumar | AIADMK | 37.38 |
| 2021 Tamil Nadu Legislative Assembly election | Tiruchendur | DMK | Won | 50.58 | M. Radhakrishnan | AIADMK | 36.10 |
| 2026 Tamil Nadu Legislative Assembly Election | Tiruchendur | DMK | Won | 39.09 | J. Murugan | TVK | 35.93 |
