= Lady Doak College =

First women's college in Madurai

- Motto: Semper, Pro, Veritate
- Type: Autonomous
- Established: 1948
- Affiliations: Madurai Kamaraj University
- Principal: Dr. Beulah Jeyashree
- Location: Tallakulam, Madurai, Tamil Nadu, India; 9°56′8.24″N 78°7′53.29″E
- Website: http://www.ladydoakcollege.edu.in

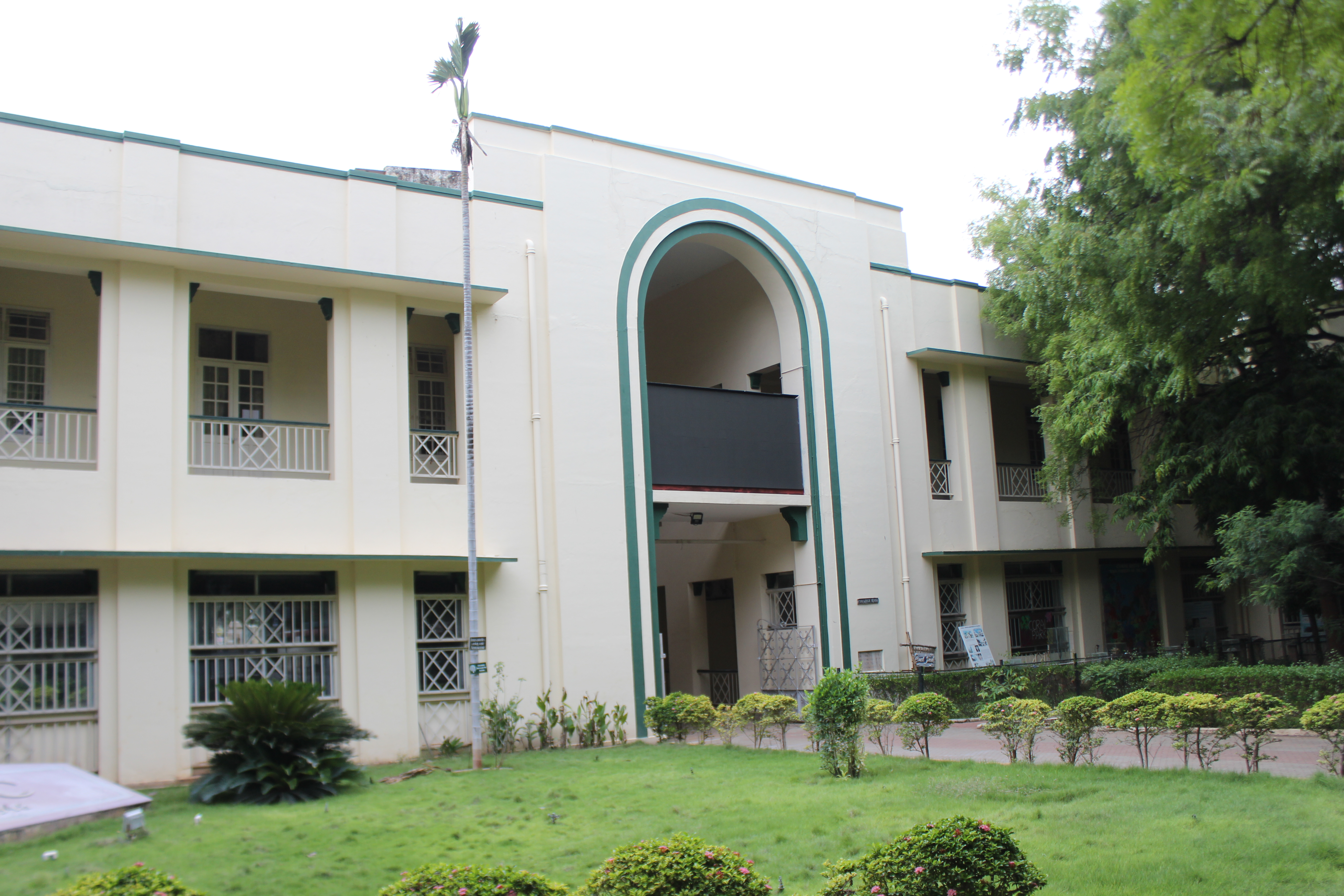
Lady Doak College

Lady Doak College (LDC) is the first women's college in Madurai in the southern Indian state of Tamil Nadu. It was founded in 1948 by Katie Wilcox, an American missionary near Tallakulam in Madurai. Today there are around 3200 students. This number was only 86 at formation. It is named after Helen Doak, the associate founder. The motto of the college consists of three Latin words, 'Semper pro Veritate' and its meaning is "Always for the truth". The college celebrated its 75th anniversary on 14 July 2023.

== Anniversary ==
In celebration of its 75th anniversary, Lady Doak College released a commemorative souvenir titled LDC serving generations. The release event was overseen by John Devadason, chairman of KWEA (Katie Wilcox Education Association), with the first copy received by Ms. V.G. Bhooma. The college also published a book, QR Coding of Trees at Lady Doak College. This was written by Dr. Joy Marjorie Annal D, an assistant professor in the Department of Botany.

== Location ==
It is located on Lady Doak College road near Narimedu and Bibikulam, places which are well-connected by road transport.

== Rankings ==
The college was ranked 86 among colleges in India by National Institutional Ranking Framework (NIRF) in 2022.

== Principals ==
- Dr. Marian Oommen, 1948-1950
- Dr. E. Thillayampalam, 1950 - 1955
- Dr. I. Wilhelmsson, 1955 - 1956
- Miss G. Gnanadickam, 1956 - 1966
- Dr. Margaret Clapp, 1966 - 1967
- Miss S. Manuel, 1967 - 1993
- Dr. Mrs. Prema Michael, 1993 - 1996
- Dr. Mrs. Nirmala Jeyaraj, 1996 - 2008
- Dr. Mrs. Mercy Pushpalatha, 2008 - 2017
- Dr. Christianna Singh, 2017 – 2024
- Dr. Beulah Jeyashree, May 2024 to present
