= By-elections to the 13th Tamil Nadu Assembly =

Tamil Nadu assembly by-election, 2006-11
- 11 October 2006 and 26 June 20079 January 2009; 18 August 2009; 19 December 2009; 27 March 2010

10 vacant seats in the Legislature of Tamil Nadu
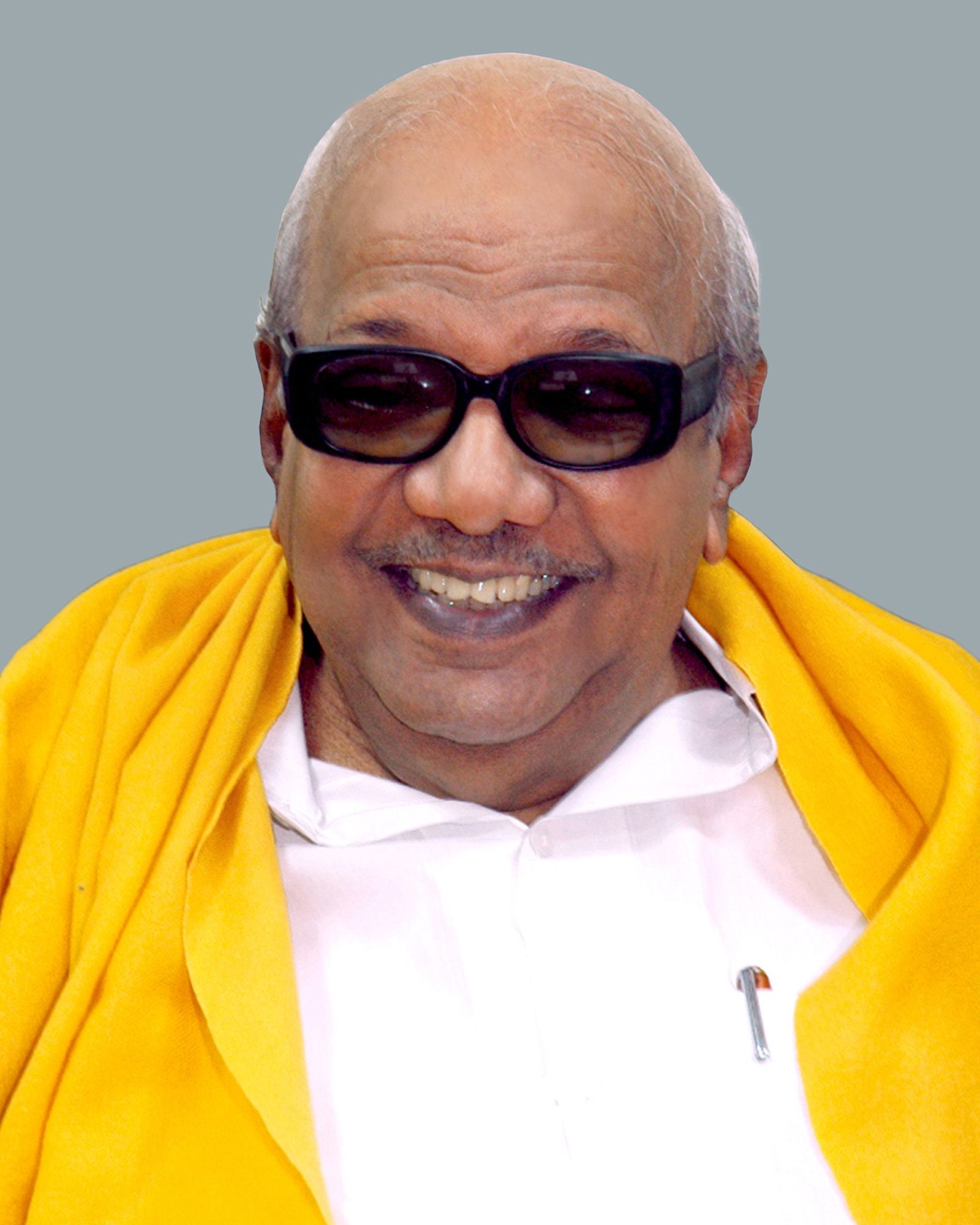

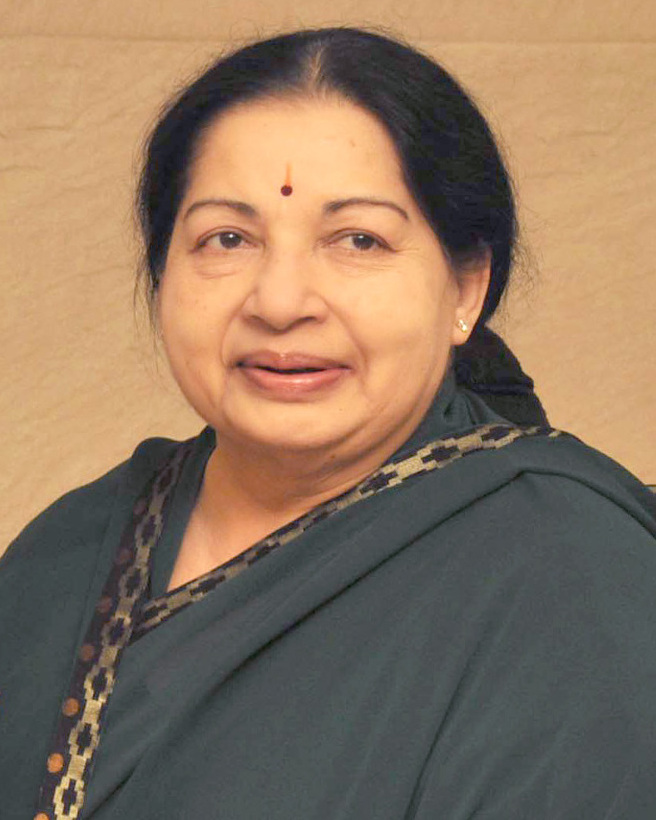

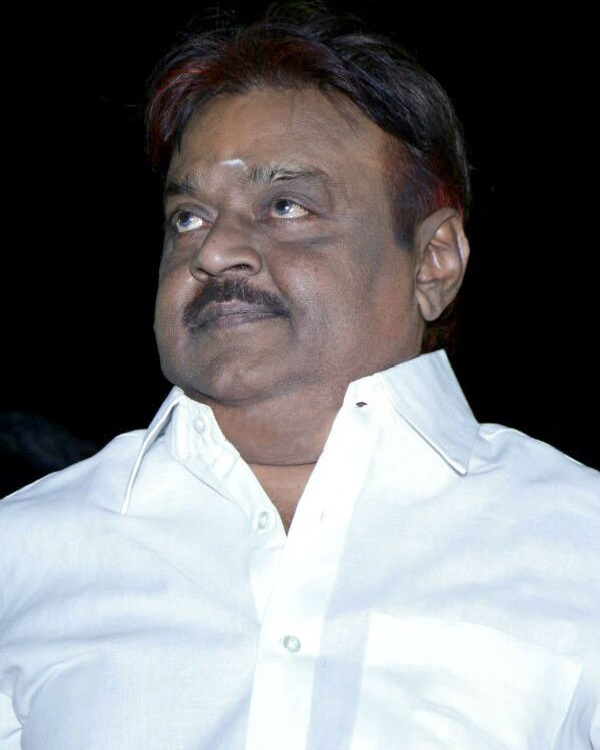
| | First party | Second party | Third party |
|---|---|---|---|
| Leader | M. Karunanidhi | J. Jayalalithaa | Vijayakanth |
| Party | DMK | AIADMK | DMDK |
| Alliance | Democratic Progressive Alliance | AIADMK-led Alliance | N/A |
| Leader's seat | Chepauk | Andipatti | Vridhachalam |
| Seats won | 11 | 0 | 0 |
| Seat change | ▲6 | ▼6 | - |
| Popular vote | 111,927 | 49,727 | 38,666 |
| Percentage | 53.61% | 23.82% | 18.52% |
| Swing | ▲10.48% | ▼16.01% | ▲6.66% |
Chief Minister before election
M. Karunanidhi
DMK
Chief Minister
M. Karunanidhi
DMK

By-elections to two state assembly constituencies were held in Tamil Nadu, India, in two separate phases. Election for Madurai Central was held on 11 October 2006 and for Madurai West was held on 26 June 2007. The election results were not expected to change the prospects of the party in power, the Dravida Munnetra Kazhagam (DMK), and its Chief Minister M. Karunanidhi.

Both phases of this by-election resulted in a big victory for DMK and Indian National Congress, who were part of the Democratic Progressive Alliance. Even though in 2006 assembly elections, AIADMK and its allies got more votes than DPA, when all the constituencies in Madurai are taken into account, the victory in both Madurai constituencies shows the increase in support by the people of Madurai for the DMK government and its policies since 2006.to nine state assembly constituencies were held in Tamil Nadu, in four separate phases. The election for Thirumangalam was held on 9 January and for Bargur, Thondamuthur, Ilaiyangudi, Cumbum, and Srivaikuntam constituencies on 18 August. Also, the election took place for Vandavasi and Tiruchendur constituency on 19 December 2009 and finally for Pennagaram constituency on 27 March 2010. Dravida Munnetra Kazhagam (DMK) defeated All India Anna Dravida Munnetra Kazhagam (AIADMK) in Thirumangalam in the first phase and kept the winning momentum in the following general election.

In the second phase, DMK-Indian National Congress alliance swept the elections. In the third phase, DMK took advantage by winning both vacant assembly seats. All three elections witnessed high turnout, 89% in Thirumangalam, average 65% in the four constituencies in the second phase and average 80% in the two constituency in the third phase. Finally, DMK continued their momentum by winning the vacant Pennagaram seat, increasing their number of seats to 100. The results of the first election was declared on 12 January, the second on 21 August, the third on 23 December and the fourth on 30 March 2010. The election results were not expected to change the prospects of the party in power, the DMK, and its Chief Minister M. Karunanidhi.

On 6 December 2009, M. Karunanidhi hinted that he might retire from active politics in June 2010. This news came before the third by-election, when he gave a speech at the function arranged by Arundathiyar organization.

== Results by alliance ==
These results reflect alliances that were present after the second by-election in 2007.

| DPA | SEATS | AIADMK+ | SEATS | OTHERS | SEATS |
|---|---|---|---|---|---|
| DMK | 96 | AIADMK | 60 (-1) | DMDK | 1 |
| INC | 35 (+1) | MDMK | 6 | Ind | 1 |
| PMK | 18 | | | | |
| CPI(M) | 9 | | | | |
| CPI | 6 | | | | |
| VCK | 2 | | | | |
| TOTAL (2007) | 166 | TOTAL (2007) | 66 | TOTAL (2007) | 2 |
| TOTAL (2006) | 163 | TOTAL (2006) | 69 | TOTAL (2006) | 2 |

- The number on the left, in the table, represents the total number of MLAs after the by-election, and the number in parentheses represents, the seats picked up or lost due to the by-election
- The numbers presented for 2006, represents, the alliance, when the VCK/DPI allied with the AIADMK.

== First by-election ==
This election was necessitated due to the death of P. T. R. Palanivel Rajan of the DMK, who was a Minister in the current DMK government.

=== Madurai Central ===
Source: Arasiyal Talk and ThatsTamil

Tamil Nadu assembly by-election, 2006-07: Madurai Central
| Party | Candidate | Votes | % | ±% |
|---|---|---|---|---|
| DMK | Syed Ghouse Basha | 50,994 | 56.11% | +10.28% |
| AIADMK | V.V. Rajan Chellappa | 19,909 | 21.91% | −16.29% |
| DMDK | M.R. Paneerselvam | 17,394 | 19.14% | +6.36% |
| DMK hold | | Swing | | |
| Majority | | 31,085 | n/a | n/a |
| Turnout | | 90,887 | 68.72% | n/a |

== Second by-election ==
The election was necessitated by the death of AIADMK MLA, S.V. Shanmugam.

=== Madurai West ===
Source: Arasiyal Talk

Tamil Nadu assembly by-election, 2006-07: Madurai West
| Party | Candidate | Votes | % | ±% |
|---|---|---|---|---|
| INC | K.S.K. Rajendiran | 60,933 | 51.68% | +10.67 |
| AIADMK | Sellur K. Raju | 29,818 | 25.59% | −15.72 |
| DMDK | Siva Muthukumaran | 21,272 | 18.04% | +6.95 |
| INC gain from AIADMK | | Swing | | |
| Majority | | 31,115 | n/a | n/a |
| Turnout | | 117,904 | n/a | n/a |

Source: Express Buzz

| DMK+ | SEATS | AIADMK+ | SEATS | OTHERS | SEATS |
|---|---|---|---|---|---|
| Dravida Munnetra Kazhagam (DMK) | 100 (+5) | All India Anna Dravida Munnetra Kazhagam (AIADMK) | 57 (-2) | Pattali Makkal Katchi (PMK) | 18 |
| Indian National Congress (INC) | 36 (+1) | Communist Party of India (Marxist) (CPM) | 9 | Desiya Murpokku Dravida Kazhagam (DMDK) | 1 |
| Dalit Panthers of India (VCK) | 2 | Communist Party of India (CPI) | 6 | Independent | 1 |
| | | Marumalarchi Dravida Munnetra Kazhagam (MDMK) | 3 (-3) | Independent | 1 |
| TOTAL (2009) | 138 | TOTAL (2009) | 75 | TOTAL (2009) | 20 |
| TOTAL (2007) | 166 | TOTAL (2007) | 66 | TOTAL (2007) | 2 |

- The number on the left, in the table, represents the total number of MLAs after the by-election, and the number in parentheses represents the seats picked up or lost due to the by-election
- The numbers presented for 2007, represents, the alliance, when the PMK, VCK and the left allied with the DMK and were part of the Democratic Progressive Alliance (DPA).
- PMK walked out of the AIADMK alliance, before the third by-election took place.

== Boycott ==
In the first by-election, PMK and the left parties, did not support the DMK candidate, which led to the alienation and breakup of the DPA. Citing concerns of the governance of M. Karunanidhi, and the alienation of his allies, they decided not to support anyone or participate in this by-election.
In the second by-election, three political parties boycotted the elections including All India Anna Dravida Munnetra Kazhagam, Marumalarchi Dravida Munnetra Kazhagam and Pattali Makkal Katchi. AIADMK general secretary J. Jayalalithaa cited unreliability of Electronic voting machines as the reason for the poll boycott. Tamil Nadu Congress party leader K. V. Thangabalu said that ADMK chose not to contest polls for fear of losing them.
In the third by-election, AIADMK decided not to boycott the by-election that was set to take place on 19 December 2009 for two constituencies. On 28 November 2009 the PMK decided to boycott the third assembly by-elections.

== First by-election ==
=== Thirumangalam ===
Source: Express buzz

Tamil Nadu assembly by-election, 2009: Thirumangalam
| Party | Candidate | Votes | % | ±% |
|---|---|---|---|---|
| DMK | Latha Athiyaman | 79,422 | 57.47% | |
| AIADMK | M. Muthuramalingam | 40,156 | 29.06% | |
| DMDK | T. Danapandiyan | 13,136 | 9.50% | |
| Majority | | 39,266 | | |
| DMK gain from MDMK | | Swing | | |

== Second by-election ==
=== Bargur ===
The election was necessitated after the previous winner M. Thambidurai was elected to the Lok Sabha in 2009 election. After the initial rejection of Desiya Murpokku Dravida Kazhagam (DMDK) candidate V. Chandran's candidacy, he was accepted to contest as an independent with Murasu as a symbol, which is the symbol of DMDK. Twenty four of thirty one nominations were rejected. Accepted nominations include K. R. K. Narasimhan (Dravida Munnetra Kazhagam), K. Asokan (Bharatiya Janata Party), S. Kannu (Communist Party of India), K. Padmarajan (Independent), Maheshwari Kannappan (Independent), S. Sakthivel (Rajini Fans Association) and A. Rajesh (Independent).

Tamil Nadu assembly by-election, 2009: Bargur
| Party | Candidate | Votes | % | ±% |
|---|---|---|---|---|
| DMK | K.R.K. Narasimhan | 89,481 | 68.31% | +25.76% |
| DMDK | V. Chandran | 30,378 | 23.19% | +15.43% |
| Majority | | 59,103 | | |
| DMK gain from AIADMK | | Swing | | |

=== Thondamuthur ===
There were four candidates from recognised parties in contest in Thondamuthur constituency - M. Chinnaraju (Bharatiya Janata Party, BJP), M. N. Kandaswamy (Indian National Congress, INC), K. Thangavelu (DMDK) and V. Perumal (CPM). E. R. Easwaran of Kongu Nadu Munnetra Kazhagam (KMK) also contested the election. The seat fell vacant when the sitting member M. Kannappan resigned after switching parties from MDMK to DMK.

Tamil Nadu assembly by-election, 2009: Thondamuthur
| Party | Candidate | Votes | % | ±% |
|---|---|---|---|---|
| INC | M.N. Kandaswamy | 112,350 | 56.61% | |
| DMDK | K. Thangavelu | 40,863 | 20.59% | |
| Majority | | 71,487 | | |
| Turnout | | 198,461 | | |
| INC gain from MDMK | | Swing | | |

=== Ilayankudi ===
Nine contestants were in fray in Ilayankudi constituency. They included three from major political parties, Suba. Mathiarasan of DMK, Azhagu. Balakrishnan of DMDK and P. M. Rajendran of BJP.

Tamil Nadu assembly by-election, 2009: Ilayankudi
| Party | Candidate | Votes | % | ±% |
|---|---|---|---|---|
| DMK | Suba. Mathiarasan | 61,084 | 71.97% | |
| DMDK | Azhagu. Balakrishnan | 19,628 | 23.13% | |
| Majority | | 41,456 | | |
| Turnout | | 84,875 | | |
| DMK hold | | Swing | | |

=== Srivaikuntam ===
11 candidates were in competition in Srivaikuntam constituency. Candidates from major political parties included M.B. Sudalaiyandi of Indian National Congress, G. Thanalakshmi of Communist Party of India, S. Santhana Kumar of Bharatiya Janata Party and M. Soundarapandi of Desiya Murpokku Dravida Kazhagam.

Tamil Nadu assembly by-election, 2009: Srivaikuntam
| Party | Candidate | Votes | % | ±% |
|---|---|---|---|---|
| INC | M.B. Sudalaiyandi | 53,827 | 63.70% | |
| DMDK | M. Soundarapandi | 22,468 | 26.59% | |
| Majority | | 31,359 | | |
| Turnout | | 84,501 | 72.47% | |
| INC hold | | Swing | | |

=== Cumbum ===
15 candidates were contesting the election including four candidates representing political parties. The candidates included N. Ramakrishnan of Dravida Munnetra Kazhagam, M. Sasikumar of Bharatiya Janata Party, K. Rajappan of Communist Party of India (Marxist), R. Arun Kumar of Desiya Murpokku Dravidar Kazhagam and G. Ramaraj of Uzhaippali Makkal Katchi.

Tamil Nadu assembly by-election, 2009: Cumbum
| Party | Candidate | Votes | % | ±% |
|---|---|---|---|---|
| DMK | N. Ramakrishnan | 81,515 | 73.64% | |
| DMDK | R. Arun Kumar | 24,142 | 21.81% | |
| Majority | | 57,373 | | |
| Turnout | | 110,700 | 75.99% | |
| DMK gain from MDMK | | Swing | | |

== Third by-election ==
AIADMK decided not to boycott the by-election that was set to take place on 19 December 2009 for two constituencies. This election will not affect the party in power, but gives a chance for both DMK and AIADMK to pick up a seat. Congress has confirmed it will campaign for DMK, while MDMK confirmed that it will campaign for the AIADMK. The left parties (CPI and CPM) have decided to extend their support for the AIADMK. On 23 November, the Pattali Makkal Katchi (PMK), who are not in alliance with either DMK or AIADMK, will only contest if the current Chief Minister M. Karunanidhi, ensures the election is run in a fair manner. The DMDK announced their candidates for the two constituencies on 27 November 2009. On 28 November 2009 the PMK decided to boycott the assembly by-elections. PMK recently walked out of the AIADMK alliance, and was expected to support the DMK candidates, but cited the dominant role of money in recent elections as one of the reasons for this decision.

For the first time, the Election Commission of India, was going to install webcams in the polling booths of the two constituencies, to monitor to see if proper procedures are taking place during voting in the polling booths.

=== Vandavasi ===
The election was necessitated after the previous winner S. P. Jayaraman, representing DMK, died earlier this month. AIADMK announced P. Munusamy as their candidate on 23 November 2009. On 24 November 2009, DMK announced that Kamalakannan is their candidate for this constituency.

Tamil Nadu assembly by-election, 2009: Vandavasi
| Party | Candidate | Votes | % | ±% |
|---|---|---|---|---|
| DMK | Kamalakannan | 78,827 | 59.38% | |
| AIADMK | P. Munusamy | 40,810 | 30.74% | |
| DMDK | N. Janardhanan | 7,063 | 5.32% | |
| DMK hold | | Swing | | |
| Majority | | 38,017 | n/a | n/a |
| Turnout | | 132,750 | 82% | n/a |

=== Tiruchendur ===
The election was necessitated after the resignation previous winner Anitha R. Radhakrishnan, due to the fact that he switched from AIADMK to DMK. Amman T. Narayanan was announced as the candidate for AIADMK on 23 November 2009. The incumbent Anitha R. Radhakrishnan was announced as the candidate for the DMK on 24 November 2009.

Tamil Nadu assembly by-election, 2009: Tiruchendur
| Party | Candidate | Votes | % | ±% |
|---|---|---|---|---|
| DMK | Anitha R. Radhakrishnan | 75,223 | 67.81% | |
| AIADMK | Amman T. Narayanan | 28,362 | 25.57% | |
| DMDK | Gomathy R. Ganesan | 4,186 | 3.77% | |
| DMK gain from AIADMK | | Swing | | |
| Majority | | 46,861 | n/a | n/a |
| Turnout | | 110,931 | 78% | n/a |

== Fourth by-election ==
DMK's P. N. P. Inbasekaran won the by-election for the Pennagaram Constituency held on 27 March 2010. This election was caused by the death of the incumbent DMK MLA P. N. Periannan on 1 December 2009. Turn out was 84.95% with 1,70,755 votes polled totally. Inbasekaran (the son of the Periannan) won by a margin of 36,000 votes over PMK's Tamil Kumaran.

Tamil Nadu assembly by-election, 2010: Pennagaram
| Party | Candidate | Votes | % | ±% |
|---|---|---|---|---|
| DMK | P. N. P Inbasekaran | 77,669 | 45.48% | |
| PMK | G. K. M Tamil Kumaran | 41,285 | 24.17% | |
| AIADMK | R. Anbazhagan | 26,787 | 15.68% | |
| DMDK | Kaveryverman | 11,406 | 6.67% | |
| DMK hold | | Swing | | |
| Majority | | 36,386 | 14.6% | |
| Turnout | | 1,70,755 | 84.95% | |

== See also ==
- Elections in Tamil Nadu
- Government of Tamil Nadu
- Legislature of Tamil Nadu
