= C. Aranganayagam =

Indian politician (1931–2021)

- Born: 16 January 1931
- Died: April 29, 2021 (aged 90)
- Occupation: politician

C. Aranganayagam (16 January 1931 – 29 April 2021) was an Indian politician. He was elected a member of Tamil Nadu Legislative assembly four times, twice from the Thondamuthur constituency and twice from the Coimbatore West constituency as an Anna Dravida Munnetra Kazhagam candidate. He also served as a Minister of Education in the sixth assembly. Later he joined DMK and quit in 2014 before the Lok Sabha election. He also served as an education minister in the Jayalalitha cabinet for the 1991–96 period. He was one of the supporters of Jayalalitha after MGR's death in 1987.

He was convicted on 17 April 2017 and sentenced to three years for amassing wealth in disproportionate case.

He died on 29 April 2021.
