= Thirumangalam Assembly constituency =

One of the 234 State Legislative Assembly Constituencies in Tamil Nadu, in India

Coordinates: 9.82°N 77.99°E

Tirumangalam
- Constituency No. 196 for the Tamil Nadu Legislative Assembly

Constituency details
- Country: India
- Region: South India
- State: Tamil Nadu
- District: Madurai
- Lok Sabha constituency: Virudhunagar
- Established: 1951
- Total electors: 259225

Member of Legislative Assembly
- 17th Tamil Nadu Legislative Assembly
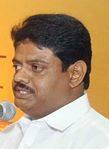
- Incumbent Sedapatti Manimaran
- Party: DMK
- Alliance: SPA
- Elected year: 2026

Tirumangalam is a state assembly constituency in Madurai district in Tamil Nadu. Elections and winners from this constituency are listed below. It is a part of Virudhunagar Lok Sabha constituency. It is one of the 234 State Legislative Assembly Constituencies in Tamil Nadu, in India.

== Members of Legislative Assembly ==
Year	Member	Political party
Madras State
1952	K. Rajaram Naidu	Indian National Congress
1957	A. V. P. Periavala Guruya Reddi	Independent
1962	Thiruvengadam	Indian National Congress
1967	N. S. V. Chithan	Indian National Congress
Tamil Nadu
1971	Rethinasamy Thevar	All India Forward Bloc
1977	P. T. Saraswathy	All India Anna Dravida Munnetra Kazhagam
1980	N. S. V. Chithan	Indian National Congress (O)
1984	N. S. V. Chithan	Indian National Congress
1989	R. Saminathan	Dravida Munnetra Kazhagam
1991	T. K. Radhakrishnan	All India Anna Dravida Munnetra Kazhagam
1996	M. Muthuramalingam	Dravida Munnetra Kazhagam
2001	K. Kalimuthu	All India Anna Dravida Munnetra Kazhagam
2006	Veera Elavarasu	Marumalarchi Dravida Munnetra Kazhagam
2009	Latha Athiyaman	Dravida Munnetra Kazhagam
2011	M. Muthuramalingam	All India Anna Dravida Munnetra Kazhagam
2016	R. B. Udhayakumar	All India Anna Dravida Munnetra Kazhagam
2021	R. B. Udhayakumar	All India Anna Dravida Munnetra Kazhagam
2026	M. Manimaran	Dravida Munnetra Kazhagam

== Election results ==
Vote share of winning candidates
2026	38.22%
2021	45.51%
2016	46.99%
2011	55.55%
2009	57.47%
2006	37.48%
2001	52.67%
1996	53.41%
1991	64.87%
1989	34.84%
1984	55.23%
1980	46.43%
1977	44.30%
1971	56.97%
1967	33.58%
1962	53.58%
1957	53.31%
1952	58.77%

=== 2026 ===
2026 Tamil Nadu Legislative Assembly election: Thirumangalam
Party	Candidate	Votes	%	±%
DMK	Sedapatti M. Manimaran	88,291	38.22	▼0.90
AIADMK	Udhayakumar R B	64,484	27.92	▼17.59
TVK	N. Sathishkumar	60,826	26.33	New
AIPTMMK	Jeevitha Nachiyar B.	2,851	1.23	New
NOTA	NOTA	933	0.4	
Margin of victory		23,807	10.31	▲3.92
Turnout		2,30,980	89.1	▲10.24
Rejected ballots				
Registered electors		259,225		
DMK gain from AIADMK		Swing		

=== 2021 ===
2021 Tamil Nadu Legislative Assembly election: Thirumangalam
Party	Candidate	Votes	%	±%
AIADMK	R. B. Udhayakumar	100,338	45.51%	−1.49
DMK	Sedapatti M. Manimaran	86,251	39.12%	New
AMMK	K. Athi Narayanan	13,780	6.25%	New
MNM	M. Ramkumar	2,775	1.26%	New
Independent	S. Veeranan	1,576	0.71%	New
Margin of victory		14,087	6.39%	−5.17%
Turnout		220,495	78.86%	0.88%
Rejected ballots		458	0.21%	
Registered electors		279,598		
AIADMK hold		Swing	-1.49%	

=== 2016 ===
2016 Tamil Nadu Legislative Assembly election: Thirumangalam
Party	Candidate	Votes	%	±%
AIADMK	R. B. Udhayakumar	95,864	46.99%	−8.56
INC	R. Jeyaram	72,274	35.43%	New
DMDK	M. Srinivasan	20,589	10.09%	New
BJP	V. R. Ramamoorthy	3,261	1.60%	New
AIFB	S. Karnan	1,813	0.89%	New
NOTA	NOTA	1,572	0.77%	New
Independent	V. S. Pandyaraj	1,232	0.60%	New
Margin of victory		23,590	11.56%	−2.87%
Turnout		204,004	77.98%	−3.65%
Registered electors		261,622		
AIADMK hold		Swing	-8.56%	

=== 2011 ===
2011 Tamil Nadu Legislative Assembly election: Thirumangalam
Party	Candidate	Votes	%	±%
AIADMK	M. Muthuramalingam	101,494	55.55%	New
DMK	Sedapatti Manimaran	75,127	41.12%	+7.09
Independent	P. Jayapandi	1,469	0.80%	New
BSP	V. Vaiyadurai	1,389	0.76%	+0.04
Margin of victory		26,367	14.43%	10.99%
Turnout		182,703	81.63%	10.70%
Registered electors		223,822		
AIADMK gain from DMK		Swing	18.07%	

=== 2009 by-election ===
The Election Commission of India announced a by-election for this constituency after the death of the incumbent MLA. There were 156,615 registered electors in the 2009 by-election.

Tamil Nadu assembly by-election, 2009: Thirumangalam
Party	Candidate	Votes	%	±%
DMK	Latha Athiyaman	79,422	57.47	▲23.44
AIADMK	M. Muthuramalingam	40,156	29.06	▼8.41
DMDK	T. Danapandiyan	13,136	9.50	▼7.10
Majority		39,266	28.41	▲24.97
Turnout		138,191	88.23	▲17.3
DMK gain from MDMK		Swing	▲23.44	

=== 2006 ===
2006 Tamil Nadu Legislative Assembly election: Thirumangalam
Party	Candidate	Votes	%	±%
MDMK	Veera Elavarasu	45,067	37.48%	+28.78
DMK	V. Velusamy	40,923	34.03%	−2.17
DMDK	T. Dhanapandiyan	19,970	16.61%	New
BJP	T. Ochathevar	7,790	6.48%	New
Independent	C. Sundarraj	1,593	1.32%	New
Independent	A. Veluchamy	1,193	0.99%	New
JD(U)	P. Gurusamy	1,118	0.93%	New
AIFB	M. Raj	899	0.75%	New
BSP	G. Ramaiah	866	0.72%	New
Margin of victory		4,144	3.45%	−13.02%
Turnout		120,248	70.93%	5.45%
Registered electors		169,523		
MDMK gain from AIADMK		Swing	-15.19%	

=== 2001 ===
2001 Tamil Nadu Legislative Assembly election: Thirumangalam
Party	Candidate	Votes	%	±%
AIADMK	K. Kalimuthu	58,080	52.67%	+26.39
DMK	T. Ocha Thevar	39,918	36.20%	−17.21
MDMK	K. R. Swaminathan	9,591	8.70%	−7.97
Independent	M. R. Mathiyalagan	1,177	1.07%	New
JD(U)	Rajasekaran M	809	0.73%	New
Independent	R. Karmegam	693	0.63%	New
Margin of victory		18,162	16.47%	−10.66%
Turnout		110,268	65.48%	−2.08%
Registered electors		168,403		
AIADMK gain from DMK		Swing	-0.74%	

=== 1996 ===
1996 Tamil Nadu Legislative Assembly election: Thirumangalam
Party	Candidate	Votes	%	±%
DMK	M. Muthuramalingam	56,950	53.41%	+20.85
AIADMK	S. Andithevar	28,025	26.28%	−38.58
MDMK	R. Saminathan	17,769	16.67%	New
PMK	P. Gajendran	2,643	2.48%	New
Margin of victory		28,925	27.13%	−5.18%
Turnout		106,622	67.56%	5.36%
Registered electors		165,523		
DMK gain from AIADMK		Swing	-11.45%	

=== 1991 ===
1991 Tamil Nadu Legislative Assembly election: Thirumangalam
Party	Candidate	Votes	%	±%
AIADMK	T. K. Radhakrishnan	62,774	64.87%	New
DMK	R. Saminathan	31,511	32.56%	−2.28
THMM	P. V. Sankaralingam	620	0.64%	New
PMK	A. P. Raju	510	0.53%	New
Margin of victory		31,263	32.31%	28.08%
Turnout		96,774	62.21%	−5.85%
Registered electors		160,424		
AIADMK gain from DMK		Swing	30.03%	

=== 1989 ===
1989 Tamil Nadu Legislative Assembly election: Thirumangalam
Party	Candidate	Votes	%	±%
DMK	R. Saminathan	33,433	34.84%	−7.42
INC	N. S. V. Chitthan	29,378	30.61%	−24.62
Independent	K. A. Ingarsaa	11,213	11.68%	New
Independent	V. A. Seenivasan	9,912	10.33%	New
Independent	P. Subbiah	9,168	9.55%	New
Independent	P. Gajandran	1,123	1.17%	New
Independent	P. K. Atharamalai	866	0.90%	New
Margin of victory		4,055	4.23%	−8.75%
Turnout		95,967	68.06%	−3.38%
Registered electors		143,792		
DMK gain from INC		Swing	-20.39%	

=== 1984 ===
1984 Tamil Nadu Legislative Assembly election: Thirumangalam
Party	Candidate	Votes	%	±%
INC	N. S. V. Chitthan	46,146	55.23%	+8.8
DMK	A. Athiyanan	35,304	42.26%	New
Independent	A. Kaliyappan	1,269	1.52%	New
Independent	R. K. Kannan	535	0.64%	New
Margin of victory		10,842	12.98%	8.35%
Turnout		83,549	71.44%	5.95%
Registered electors		123,317		
INC hold		Swing	8.80%	

=== 1980 ===
1980 Tamil Nadu Legislative Assembly election: Thirumangalam
Party	Candidate	Votes	%	±%
INC	N. S. V. Chitthan	35,181	46.43%	+4.8
AIFB	A. R. Perumal	31,679	41.81%	New
JP	K. A. Ingarsal	8,033	10.60%	New
Independent	S. Krishnan	873	1.15%	New
Margin of victory		3,502	4.62%	1.96%
Turnout		75,766	65.48%	4.88%
Registered electors		117,383		
INC gain from AIADMK		Swing	2.14%	

=== 1977 ===
1977 Tamil Nadu Legislative Assembly election: Thirumangalam
Party	Candidate	Votes	%	±%
AIADMK	P. T. Saraswathy	29,493	44.30%	New
INC	N. S. V. Chitthan	27,720	41.63%	−1.4
DMK	U. M. Kannuchamy	3,948	5.93%	New
JP	M. Balasamy Thevar	3,901	5.86%	New
Independent	R. Jaganathan	1,520	2.28%	New
Margin of victory		1,773	2.66%	−11.27%
Turnout		66,582	60.61%	−9.45%
Registered electors		110,967		
AIADMK gain from AIFB		Swing	-12.67%	

=== 1971 ===
1971 Tamil Nadu Legislative Assembly election: Thirumangalam
Party	Candidate	Votes	%	±%
AIFB	M. C. A. Rethinasamy Thevar	36,468	56.97%	New
INC	N. S. V. Chitthan	27,548	43.03%	+9.45
Margin of victory		8,920	13.93%	8.55%
Turnout		64,016	70.06%	1.50%
Registered electors		97,173		
AIFB gain from INC		Swing	23.38%	

=== 1967 ===
1967 Madras Legislative Assembly election: Thirumangalam
Party	Candidate	Votes	%	±%
INC	N. S. V. Chitthan	20,319	33.58%	−20
SWA	M. P. Rajan	17,062	28.20%	New
Independent	Kamalam	13,890	22.96%	New
Independent	Pethinayacker	6,246	10.32%	New
Independent	M. C. S. Arumugam	2,986	4.94%	New
Margin of victory		3,257	5.38%	−7.58%
Turnout		60,503	68.56%	−4.37%
Registered electors		89,584		
INC hold		Swing	-20.00%	

=== 1962 ===
1962 Madras Legislative Assembly election: Thirumangalam
Party	Candidate	Votes	%	±%
INC	Thiruvengada Reddiar	34,188	53.58%	+11.75
SWA	M. C. M. Muthumarama Thevar	25,919	40.62%	New
Independent	T. S. Krishnan	2,846	4.46%	New
Independent	Ayyappa Naidu	852	1.34%	New
Margin of victory		8,269	12.96%	1.48%
Turnout		63,805	72.93%	17.20%
Registered electors		91,765		
INC gain from Independent		Swing	0.27%	

=== 1957 ===
1957 Madras Legislative Assembly election: Thirumangalam
Party	Candidate	Votes	%	±%
Independent	A. V. P. Periavala Guruya Reddi	25,844	53.31%	New
INC	K. Rajaram	20,281	41.84%	−16.93
Independent	V. Chitra Gounder	2,352	4.85%	New
Margin of victory		5,563	11.48%	−27.81%
Turnout		48,477	55.73%	1.32%
Registered electors		86,991		
Independent gain from INC		Swing	-5.45%	

=== 1952 ===
1952 Madras Legislative Assembly election: Thirumangalam
Party	Candidate	Votes	%	±%
INC	K. Rajaram	24,220	58.77%	New
KMPP	T. Manickavasagam	8,029	19.48%	New
Independent	V. Venkataram Naidu	6,473	15.71%	New
Independent	A. Chitrai Gounder	2,493	6.05%	New
Margin of victory		16,191	39.28%	
Turnout		41,215	54.41%	
Registered electors		75,754		
INC win (new seat)				
