= 1952 Madras State Legislative Assembly election =

1952 Madras Legislative Assembly election
- 2–25 January 1952

All 375 seats in the Madras Legislative Assembly 188 seats needed for a majority
- Registered: 36,600,615
- Turnout: 54.75%
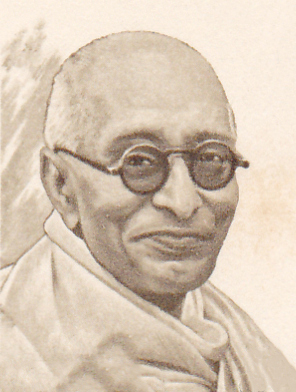

	Majority party	Minority party
Leader	C. Rajagopalachari	M. Kalyanasundaram
Party	INC	CPI
Leader's seat	MLC	Tiruchirappalli North
Seats won	152	62
Popular vote	6,988,701	2,640,337
Percentage	34.88%	13.18%
	Third party	Fourth party
Party	KMPP	Socialist
Leader's seat	—	—
Seats won	35	13
Popular vote	1,803,377	1,299,282
Percentage	9.00%	6.48%
- Results by district
Chief Minister before election
P.S. Kumaraswamy Raja
INC
Elected Chief Minister
C. Rajagopalachari
INC

The 1952 Madras Legislative Assembly election was held for nine days from 2 January to 25 January 1952, and the votes were counted on 27 March 1952 to elect all 375 members of the Legislative Assembly of Madras State (present-day Tamil Nadu). They were the first elections held in the state following Indian independence. Although voting was held in 1952, the Election Commission of India officially designated it as taking place in 1951.

No party won an outright majority in the election, though the Indian National Congress (INC) emerged as the largest party with 152 seats and more than a third of the vote. The Communist Party of India (CPI) came in second with 62 seats, followed by the Kisan Mazdoor Praja Party (KMPP) with 35 seats. Outgoing chief minister P. S. Kumaraswamy Raja lost the election from the Srivilliputhur Constituency. C. Rajagopalachari of the INC was elected chief minister as a consensus candidate.

This was the only election for Madras State where it still encompassed the Telugu-speaking areas of what is present-day Andhra Pradesh, as it split off to form Andhra State in 1953. The separation consolidated the non-Brahmin INC faction led by K. Kamaraj. Opposition to his education policy led to Rajagopalachari's resignation in 1954 and Kamaraj was elected chief minister in his stead.

== Background ==
Indian administrative divisions, as of 1951

=== Factionalism in Congress ===
In the years after the 1946 election, factionalism was common place in the Congress party in Madras. During 1946–51, three different Congress chief ministers headed the Madras government. T. Prakasam was the chief minister of Madras presidency immediately after the 1946 election. As a Telugu speaker, he was often at odds with the Madras Provincial Congress Committee president K. Kamaraj. Kamaraj forced the resignation of Prakasam within a year. In 1947, Omandur Ramaswamy Reddiar, Kamaraj's nominee, became the chief minister. When Reddiar showed signs of independence, Kamaraj engineered his removal by a vote of no confidence in Congress Legislature Party on 31 March 1949. P. S. Kumaraswamy Raja, the next chief minister who formed the government on 6 April 1949, was believed to be a stooge of Kamaraj. He retained the chief ministership until the 1952 election, when he lost his seat in Srivilliputhur constituency. The main factions within the Madras Congress Party during this period were: 1) the Andhra (Prakasam) faction, 2) the Rajaji faction 3) Kamaraj faction (Tamil non-Brahmin members) and 4)the Bezawada Gopala Reddy and Kala Venkata Rao faction supported by the All India Congress Committee president Pattabhi Sitaramayya

The Prakasam faction later split from the Congress to form the Hyderabad State Praja Party. The party merged with the Kisan Mazdoor Praja Party in June 1951.

=== Communists in electoral process ===
In 1951, the Communist Party of India (CPI), which had waged an armed struggle from 1948 to 1951, gave up the attempt to wrest power through force and joined the political mainstream. At the 1951 congress of the party, "People's Democracy" was replaced by "National Democracy" as the main slogan of the party and the decision was made to contest the elections. One of the armed movements supported by the CPI was the Telangana Rebellion in the princely state of Hyderabad. Though the rebellion was crushed by 1951, the communists retained widespread support in the neighboring Andhra region. This was due to their policy of linguistic nationalism (the demand for a separate state of Telugu speaking people) and their support base amongst the Kamma caste which was opposed to the Reddy supported Congress. Until then, all the previous elections had been conducted on a limited franchise based on property ownership qualifications. The election of 1951 was the first one to be based on a universal franchise. The Communists had the support of most of the first time voters – landless peasants and agricultural labourers.

They also had a strong presence in the agrarian district of Tanjore in Tamil Nadu where they were supported by the Dravidar Kazhagam. Besides they were strong in the Malabar District on the West Coast that would later become what is now Northern Kerala since 1956. Their agenda in Malabar was the unification of Malayalam speaking areas of Madras state with the Travancore-Cochin to form Aikya Keralam (United Kerala).

=== Split in the Dravidian Movement ===
The Dravidar Kazhagam (DK), the main opposition party to the Congress in the Tamil speaking areas of the state split in 1949. C. N. Annadurai, once a protege of the DK leader Periyar E. V. Ramasamy, quit the DK and founded a new party – Dravida Munnetra Kazhagam (DMK). Both the DK and the DMK were secessionist advocates for Dravidistan- a separate state for Dravidians. Some of the old guard of the Justice party, which had been renamed as Dravidar Kazhagam in 1944, refused to accept Periyar's leadership. Led by P. T. Rajan, they insisted they were still the real Justice party and contested the 1952 elections under the "Scales" symbol.

== Constituencies ==
According to the Delimitation of Parliamentary and Assembly Constituencies (Madras) Order, 1951, made by the President under sections 6 and 9 of the Representation of the People Act, 1950, the Madras Legislative Assembly consisted of 375 seats to be filled by election, distributed in 309 constituencies and 62 two-member constituencies in each of which a seat had been reserved for Scheduled Castes and four two-member constituencies in each of which a seat had been reserved for Scheduled Tribes. Three seats were uncontested. The elections were conducted for the remaining 372 seats.

The two member constituencies were established in accordance to Article 332 of the Indian Constitution. The voting method and the plurality electoral formula were defined in The Representation of People Act, 1950. Out of the total 309 constituencies in the undivided Madras State, 66 were two member constituencies, 62 of which had one seat reserved for Scheduled Caste candidates and 4 for Scheduled Tribe candidates. These constituencies were larger in size and had greater number of voters (more than 1,00,000) when compared to general constituencies. Two separate list of candidates, a general list and a reserved list, contested in those constituencies. Each voter had to cast two votes – one for each list.

The two winners were chosen as follows:

- Reserved Member – Candidate with the most votes among the reserved (SC/ST) list candidates
- General Member – Candidate with the most votes among the rest of the candidates excluding the Reserved Member (including both reserved and general lists)

This system led to anomalies. In some cases like the Coimbatore – II constituency in the 1957 election, both elected members belonged to the reserved list – the candidate with second highest number of votes in reserved list secured more votes than the highest vote getter in the general list. Multiple members were elected only in the 1952 and 1957 elections as double member representation was abolished in 1961 by the enactment of Two-Member Constituencies Abolition Act (1961).

== Political parties ==
The main opponents for the Congress in Madras were the CPI, Prakasam's Kisan Mazdoor Praja Party (KMPP) and the Krishikar Lok Party led by N. G. Ranga (a breakaway group from KMPP's predecessor - the Hyderabad State Praja Party). The Dravida Munnetra Kazhagam (DMK) did not contest the 1952 election. Instead it supported the candidates of the Vanniyar caste based parties – the Commonweal Party and the Tamil Nadu Toilers Party – and five independents in Chengelpet, Salem, North and South Arcot districts. The candidates they backed had to sign a pledge to support DMK's agenda in the legislative assembly. The Dravidar Kazhagam also did not participate directly in the election. However, it supported the Communists in an effort to defeat the Indian National Congress which it claimed was a Brahmin dominated party. It also supported a number of other parties and Independents in the election. The Justice party, led by P. T. Rajan contested in nine seats.

== Election ==
Polling was held in nine phases (2, 5, 8, 9, 11, 12, 16, 21 and 25 January) in January 1952. In all, 2,507 persons filed their nominations-2,472 men and 35 women. Of these, the nominations were rejected in respect of 79 candidates-78 men and one woman. Seven hundred and fifty-one candidates withdrew their nominations in time-741 men and 10 women.

== Results ==
Summary of results of the 1952 Madras Legislative Assembly election
Political party	Flag	Seats Contested	Won	% of Seats	Votes	Vote %	Govt. Formation
Indian National Congress		367	152	40.53	69,88,701	34.88	Leading Party
Socialist Party		163	13	3.47	12,99,282	6.48	Leading Party
Kisan Mazdoor Praja Party		148	35	9.33	18,03,377	9.00	^{**}Full support
Communist Party of India		131	62	16.53	26,40,337	13.18	^{**}Full support
Krishikar Lok Party^{#}		63	15	4.00	6,29,893	3.14	^{*}Outside support, joined the cabinet in 1954
Republican Party of India		37	2	0.53	3,39,680	1.70	^{*}Outside support, joined the cabinet in 1954
Tamil Nadu Toilers' Party^{*}		34	19	5.07	8,52,330	4.25	^{*}Outside support, joined the cabinet in 1954
Commonweal Party^{**}		13	6	1.60	2,18,288	1.09	^{*}Outside support, joined the cabinet in 1954
Madras State Muslim League Party^{**}		13	5	1.33	1,86,546	0.93	^{#}3 KLP legislators and 15 Independents joined Congress
Justice Party		9	1	0.27	82,231	0.41	^{#}3 KLP legislators and 15 Independents joined Congress
All India Forward Bloc		6	3	0.80	1,38,203	0.69	^{#}3 KLP legislators and 15 Independents joined Congress
Independent^{#}		667	62	16.53	47,58,768	23.75	^{#}3 KLP legislators and 15 Independents joined Congress
Total seats		375	Voters	3,66,00,615	Turnout	2,00,38,423 (54.75%)	

== Government formation ==
=== Election of C. Rajagopalachari ===
The composite Madras State then included parts of Andhra Pradesh, Kerala and Karnataka with a total of 375 assembly members. The Indian National Congress was reduced to a minority with 152 members in an assembly of 375. It won four seats from the 29 in Malabar, 43 of the 143 in the Andhra areas, 96 of the 190 Tamil constituencies and 9 of the 11 seats from Kannada speaking areas. Kumaraswami Raja, the incumbent chief minister lost the election along with five members of his cabinet (Bezawada Gopala Reddy, Kala Venkata Rao, K. Chandramouli, K. Madhava Menon and M. Bhaktavatsalam).

A large number of CPI members were elected from Andhra region of Madras state which had for some years demanded a separate state for Telugu speaking areas. In February 1952, the non-congress members convened under T. Prakasam, leader of the KMPP, at Madras to form the United Democratic Front (UDF) and issued a "Common Minimum Program". They claimed to control 166 seats (CPI and CPI backed independents – 70, KMPP – 36, Tamil Nadu Toilers Party – 19, Commonweal party – 6, FBL (MG) – 3, SCF – 1, JUSP −1 and Independents – 30). Prakasam wrote to the Governor Sri Prakasa staking his claim to form the Government as the leader of the single largest formation. The Congress did not want the Communists taking power or to impose Governor's rule in the state. It brought Rajaji out of retirement to form the Government as a consensus candidate. Kamaraj, President of the Madras Provincial Congress Committee was of the opinion that the UDF should be allowed to form the Government as he had predicted the weak coalition might eventually fall apart. However other leaders such as T. T. Krishnamachari and Ramnath Goenka wanted Rajaji to be nominated to form the Government.

Rajaji was invited by Sri Prakasa to form the Government on 1 April 1952 and was sworn in on 10 April 1952. He refused to run for a by-election and the Governor nominated him for the assembly's upper house (Legislative Council). It was considered to be a "constitutional impropriety" as the nomination of a member to the council could be done only at the recommendation of the cabinet. But in this case, the Governor acted unilaterally when no cabinet had been formed yet. On 6 May, the incumbent Speaker of the assembly, J. Shivashanmugam Pillai of the Congress was reelected as the Speaker defeating independent MLA Swayamprakasam by 206 votes to 162. On 3 July, Rajaji was able to win a vote of confidence with the support of 200 members with 151 opposing (and 1 neutral). This was the first time such a "confidence motion" was moved in any legislature in India. He was able to secure the majority by engineering a series of defections from the UDF and with the help of other parties:

- The support of the six members of Commonweal Party, (one of the two parties representing the cause of Vanniars) was obtained by giving a cabinet position to its leader – M. A. Manickavelu Naicker. 19 members of the other Vanniyar party – Tamil Nadu Toilers Party led by S. S. Ramasami Padayachi also supported the vote of confidence but did not join the cabinet. (They later joined the Kamaraj cabinet in 1954).
- Many independents joined Congress and became Congress Legislators. The strength of the Congress Legislative Party (CLP) which was 152 on 1 April 1952, increased to 165 by 3 May and to 167 by 30 September.
- Rajaji split the Krishikar Lok Party and KLP legislators P. Thimma Reddy, Neeladri Rao Reddy and Kumisetti Venkatanarayana Dora joined the Congress.
- The five members of the Madras State Muslim League provided their support to congress to prevent the communists from gaining power.

=== Election of K. Kamaraj ===
Andhra State was formed from the Telugu-speaking regions of Madras State after a widespread agitation in 1953. The Madras assembly was reduced from 375 to 230, 140 members going to Andhra and five to Mysore, with the Congress Party controlling 118 seats; an outright majority. This strengthened the positions of non-Brahmin Congress forces under the leadership of K. Kamaraj. He ousted Rajaji on 31 March 1954 and was elected the leader of Congress Legislative Party. Kamaraj consolidated his position by offering ministerial position to leaders of Tamil Nadu Toilers Party and Commonweal Party. This event marked the end of Brahmin domination in Tamil Nadu Congress.

== Impact ==
Kamaraj resigned his presidency of the Provincial Congress Committee, owning responsibility for the election loss, and was soon replaced by P. Subbarayan. Rajaji's nomination to the Legislative Council was challenged in the Madras High Court by P. Ramamurthi, the CPI MLA from Madurai North Constituency. Chief Justice Rajamannar and Justice Venkatarama Ayyar, who heard the public interest writ petition declined to intervene by opining that "the court could not decide political rights or enforce public interest or constitutional conventions". This precedent set by Governor Prakasa became the first among a long list of constitutional improprieties committed by governors to help the party in power in the central government. The Sarkaria Commission established in 1983 to examine the balance of power between state and central governments remarked on the precedent that the "Governor's task is to see that a government is formed and not to try to form a government which will pursue the policies he approves".

== Cabinet ==
=== Rajagopalachari's cabinet ===
Minister	Portfolio
C. Rajagopalachari	Chief Minister, Public and Police
A. B. Shetty	Health
C. Subramaniam	Finance, Food and Elections
K. Venkataswamy Naidu	Religious Endowments and Registration
N. Ranga Reddi	Public Works
M. V. Krishna Rao	Education, Harijan Uplift and Information
V. C. Chenniappan Gounder	Prohibition
U. Krishna Rao	Industries, Labour, Motor Transport, Railways, Posts, Telegraphs and Civil Aviation
R. Nagana Gowda	Agriculture, Forests, veterinary, Animal Husbandry, Fisheries and Cinchona
N. Sankara Reddi	Local Administration
M. A. Manickavelu Naicker	Land Revenue
K. P. Kuttikrishnan Nair	Courts, Prisons and Legal Department
Raja Sri Shanmuga Rajeswara Sethupathi	House Rent Control
S. B. P. Pattabhirama Rao	Rural Welfare, Commercial Taxes and Scheduled areas
D. Sanjeevayya	Cooperation and Housing

Changes

- Ministers belonging to Bellary and Andhra constituencies (Naganna Gowda, Sankara Reddi, Pattabirama Rao, Sanjeevayya and Ranga Reddi) stepped down on 30 September 1953, a day before Andhra State split to form a separate state. The portfolios of Agriculture, Forests, Fisheries, Cinchona, Rural Welfare, Community Projects and National Extension Schemes were handed over to M. Bhaktavatsalam on 9 October 1953. Jothi Venkatachalam was made minister for Prohibition and Women's Welfare. K. Rajaram Naidu became the Minister for Local Administration. C. Subramaniam was given the additional portfolios of education, information and publicity. V. C. Palaniswamy Gounder was put in charge of Veterinary, Animal Husbandry and Harijan welfare.

=== Kamaraj's cabinet ===
Members of cabinet who served between 13 April 1954 and 13 April 1957 under the chief ministership of Kamraj are as follows.

Minister	Portfolio
K. Kamaraj	Chief Minister; Minister of Public and Police in the Home Department
A. B. Shetty	Minister in charge of medical and public health, cooperation, housing and ex-servicemen
M. Bhaktavatsalam	Minister in charge of Agriculture, Forests, Fisheries, Cinchona, Rural Welfare, Community Projects, National Extension Scheme, Women's Welfare, Industries and Labour and Animal Husbandry and Veterinary
C. Subramaniam	Minister in charge of Finance, Food, Education, Elections and Information and Publicity and Law (Courts and Prisons)
M. A. Manickavelu Naicker	Minister in charge of Land Revenue and Commercial Taxes and Rural Development.
Raja Sri Shanmuga Rajeswara Sethupathi	Minister in charge of Public Works, Accommodation Control, Engineering Colleges, Stationery and Printing including Establishment questions of the Stationery Department and the Government Press
B. Parameswaran	Minister in charge of Transport, Harijan Uplift, Hindu Religious Endowments, Registration and Prohibition
S. S. Ramasami Padayachi	Minister in charge of Local Administration

Changes

- Following the States Reorganisation Act of 1956, A. B. Shetty quit the ministry on 1 March 1956 and his portfolio was shared between other ministers in the cabinet.

== List of elected members ==
=== Tamil Nadu ===
Election results from constituencies which would later become part of Tamil Nadu, Andhra Pradesh, Kerala and Mysore state are listed here.

*	Non-elected chief minister of Madras State

Constituency	Winner	Party	Runner-up	Party
Nominated	C. Rajagopalachari	INC		
Adirampattinam	S. Venkatarama Iyer	INC	K. Muthiah	CPI
Aduthurai	Narayanaswami Naidu	INC	Samiappa Mudaliar	JUSP
Alangulam	Chinnathambi	INC	Thangarathnasamy Nadar	IND
Ambasamudram	P. Chockalingam	IND	Lakshmisankara Iyer	INC
Arakkonam	Bhakthavathsalu Naidu	IND	Vedachalam	INC
Arantangi	Mahamad Salihu Maraicair	INC	Ramaswamy Thevar	IND
Arcot	S. Panchaksharam Chettiar	INC	Nagarathinam	CWP
Aravakurichi	N. Rathina Gounder	IND	T. M. Nallaswamy	INC
Ariyalur	Palaniandi	IND	Razar	INC
Arni	V. K. Kannan	CWP	W. S. Srinivasa Rao	INC
Aruppukottai	Jayarama Reddiar	INC	M. D. Ramaswami	IND
Authoor	Soundaram Ramachandran	INC	V. S. S. Mani Chettiar	IND
Attur	P. Subramaniam	IND	P. Sellamuthu Padayachi	INC
Chengalpattu	K. Vinayakam	KMPP	V. L. Raja	INC
Bhavani	B. K. Nallaswami	INC	N. Palaniswamy Gounder	TTP
Bhuvanagiri	V. Krishnaswamy Padayachi	INC	S. Tiruvenkata Nainar	TTP
Chengam	Ramaswami Gounder	CWP	Muthukrishna Chettiar	INC
Cheranmahadevi	S. Chellapandi	INC	S. Dasaratharam	SP
Cheyyar	Dharmalinga Nayakar	CWP	P. Ramachandran	INC
Chidambaram	1) Swami Sahajananda; 2) Vagheesan Pillai	INC; INC	3) Swamikannu; 4) Sivasubramanian	TTP; TTP
Choolai	Sebastian Cyril Constantine Anthony Pillai	SP	D. K. Kannappar	INC
Coimbatore	C. Subramaniam	INC	C. P. Kandaswamy	CPI
Cuddalore	1) Rathinam; 2) Sivachidambara Ramaswami Padayachi	TTP; TTP	3) Srinivasa Padayachi; 4) Ganesan	INC; INC
Cumbum	P. T. Rajan	JUSP	S. K. Ahmed Meeran	INC
Dharapuram	Senapathi Gounder	IND	Nataraja Gounder	INC
Dharmapuri	P. R. Rajagopla Gounder	IND	R. S. Veerappa Chettiar	IND
Dindigul	Munisamy Pillai	INC	A. Balasubramaniam	CPI
Edappadi	S. Arthanareeswara Gounder	INC	S. Marimuthu Gounder	TTP
Edirkottai	R. Krishnasamy Naidu	INC	Muthuramanujam	IND
Erode	Raju	CPI	Deivasigamani Gounder	INC
Gingee	Aranganathan	TTP	K. Ramakrishnaswamy Pillai	INC
Gopichettipalayam	P. S. Nalla Gounder	INC	P. K. Nalla Gounder	IND
Gudiyatham	1) A. J. Arunachala Mudaliar; 3) Rathnaswamy	INC	2) P. S. Rajagopala Naidu; 4) Kannabiran	IND; CPI
Harbour	Krishna Rao	INC	Ibrahim Sahib	IND
Harur	1) A. Duraiswami Gounder; 2) Nanjappan	IND; INC	3) Sambasiva Reddy; 4) Mariappan	INC; SCF
Hosur	M. Muni Reddy	IND	K. Appavu Pillai	INC
Jayankondan	1) Ayyavu; 2) K. R. Viswanathan	TTP; TTP	3) Muthukumaraswamy Mudaliar; 4) Raghupathi	INC; INC
Kadambur	Venugopala Krishnaswamy	INC	Subbiah Naicker	IND
Kalasapakkam	Nataraja Mudaliar	IND	Periasami Gounder	INC
Kallakurichi	1) Elaya Pillai; 2) Anandan	IND; INC	3) Govindan; 4) Parthasarathy	TTP; INC
Kancheepuram	Deivasigamani	KMPP	P. S. Srinivasan	INC
Kangayam	A. K. Subbaraya Gounder	INC	Not contested	Not contested
Karaikudi	Chockalingam Chettiar	INC	Mahalingam Chettiar	IND
Karur	1) M. Manickasundaram; 3) T. V. Sannasi	IND; INC	2) S. Muthusamy Gounder; 4) Vadivel Moopan	INC; IND
Kodumudi	Nallasivan	SP	Makutapathy Gounder	INC
Koilpalaya	V. K. Palaniswamy Gounder	INC	Ramaswamy Naidu	SP
Kovilpatti	Ramasamy	INC	Shanmugham	IND
Krishnagiri	D. Krishnamoorthy Gounder	IND	S. Nagaraia Maniar	INC
Kumbakonam	Varadan	INC	Somu Rao	CPI
Lalgudi	Raja Chidambaram	IND	Varadarajan	INC
Manamadurai	Krishnaswami Ayyangar	INC	Abdul Gafoor	CPI
Madukkarai	R. Kuppuswami	INC	Chinnadurai	SP
Madurai North	P. Ramamoorthy	CPI	T. Chidambara Bharathi	INC
Madurai South	T. K. Rama	INC	A. Dharmaraj Santhosam	IND
Madurantakam	1) B. Parameswaran; 2) V. Venkatasubba Reddi	INC; INC	3) K. Muthulinga Reddiar; 4) Kothandarama Reddiar	REP; SP
Manachanallur	Rajagopal	INC	Arunachalam	IND
Manapparai	Antony Peter	INC	Kulandaivel	IND
Mannargudi	1) M. Kandaswami; 3) Subbiah	CPI; CPI	2) Ramachandra Naidu; 4) Thiagu Voikarar	INC; INC
Mayuram	1) K. R. Sambandan; 2) A. Veloo	IND; IND	K. Pitchai; N. Rangaswami Reddiar	INC; INC
Mecheri	S. Subramania Gounder	INC	M. Kandasamy Kandan	IND
Melmalayur	V. Gopala Gounder	TTP	K. Gopala Gounder	INC
Melur	1) S. Chinnakaruppa Thevar; 2) P. Sivaprakasam	INC; INC	3) B. Ponnuchami Ambalam; 4) K. Veerana Veduvan	FBL(MG); CPI
Mettupalayam	Kempi Gounder	IND	Azad Abdul Salam	INC
Mudukulathur	1) Mottaya Kudumbar; 2) U. Muthuramalingam Thevar	FBL(MG); FBL(MG)	3) Sankaran; 4) Shanmuga Sundaram	INC
Musiri	Thangavelu	IND	M. P. Krishnaswami	INC
Mylapore	C. R. Ramaswamy	INC	Krishnamurthi	IND
Nagapattinam	1) Sivaraj; 2) Vadivelu	CPI; CPI	3) Duraisamy; 4) Shanmugasundaram Pillai	INC; INC
Namakkal	1) K. V. Ramaswamy; 2) M. P. Periaswami	CPI; INC	3) T. Sivagnanam Pillai; 4) S. Chinnayan	INC; IND
Nambiyur	1) P. G. Karuthiruman; 2) P. G. Manickam	INC; INC	3) C. K. Subramaniam Gounder; 4) K. A. Palaniappan	IND; SCF
Nanguneri	M. G. Sankar Reddiyar	INC	Madaswamy	IND
Nannilam	1) Muthukumaraswami; 2) Thyagaraja Pillai	INC; INC	3) Anthony Muthu; 4) Kalyanasundaram Pillai	CPI; CPI
Nidamangalam	Venkatesa Sholagar	CPI	Sambasiva Ayyar	INC
Nilakottai	1) Ayyanar; 2) Muthu Thevar	INC; INC	3) Ponniah Konar; 4) Govindan	IND; SP
Nilgiris	1) Ari Gowder; 2) K. H. Bomman	IND; INC	3) R. Raman Nair; 4) C. P. Krishnaiah	INC; IND
Oddanchatram	Subramanya Lakshmipathy Naicker	IND	K. Karuthappa Gounder	INC
Omalur	P. Rathinaswami Pillai	IND	K. Nanjappa Chettiar	INC
Panruti	S. Radhakrishnan	TTP	P. A. Ranganatha Padayachi	INC
Palani	M. P. Mangala Gounder	IND	P. S. K. Lakshmipathi Raju	INC
Palavoor	T. Ganapathy	INC	N. Duraipandi	KMPP
Papanasam	Swayamprakasam	IND	Abdul Majid Sahib	INC
Paramakudi	Govindan	INC	Natarajan	CPI
Paramathy	R. Rangaswami Gounder	IND	P. V. Kuppayandi Pillai	INC
Pattukottai	Nadimuthu Pillai	INC	Marimuthu	SP
Pennagaram	S. Kandaswami Gounder	TTP	M. N. Raja Chettiar	IND
Perambalur	1) Paramasivam; 3) Palanimuthu	IND; TTP	2) Thangavelu; 4) Pariannan	TTP; IND
Perambur	S. Pakkirisami Pillai	SP	M. Santhosam	INC
Periyakulam	1) V. Muthu; 2) Mookayya Thevar	INC; FBL(MG)	3) N. R. Thyagarajan; 4) Ponnuchami	INC; SP
Pollachi	1) N. Mahalingam; 2) P. K. Thirumurthy	INC; INC	3) Marudachalam; 4) Palanisami	CPI; CPI
Polur	Manickavelu Naicker	CWP	Annamalai Chetty	INC
Ponneri	1) O. Chengam Pillai; 2) Gajapathi Reddiar	KMPP; KMPP	3) M. Bhaktavatsalam; 4) C. Lakshmana Pillai	INC; INC
Pudukkottai	Balakrishnan	TTP	Natesan Ambalakkarar	INC
Ramanathapuram	Shanmugha Rajeswara Sethupathy	INC	Rajamanickam	CPI
Ranipet	Kadir Sheriff	INC	Munuswami Gounder	CWP
Rasipuram	T. M. Kaliannan	INC	K. Ramaswamy	IND
Saidapet	1) T. P. Elumalai; 2) N. Ramakrishna Iyer	INC; INC	3) R. Kannan; 4) M. S. Gnanaprakasam	REP; KMPP
Salem Rural	C. Lakshma Kandan	INC	A. Subramaniam	TTP
Salem Town	Varadarajulu Naidu	INC	Mohan Kumaramangalam	CPI
Saliyamangalam	Samia Koorayar	IND	Krishnaswami Vanayar	INC
Sankaranarayanar Kovil	1) Ramasundara Karunalaya Pandyan; 3) Urkavalan	IND; INC	2) K. Sattanatha Karayalar; 4) O. Sappani	INC; IND
Sathankulam	Kosalram	IND	Meganathan	IND
Sattur	S. Ramaswami Naidu	INC	Rajarathnam	IND
Sedapatti	Thinakaraswami Thevar	INC	Kamana Thevar	SP
Sholinghur	M. Subramanya Naicker	CWP	V. M. Ramaswamy Mudaliar	INC
Sirkazhi	C. Muthia Pillai	INC	K. Swamithurai Annagar	CPI
Sivaganga	R. V. Swaminathan	INC	Velayutham Chettiar	KMPP
Sriperumbudur	T. Shanmugam	IND	Seshachari	INC
Srirangam	Chitrambalam	CPI	Srinivasan	INC
Srivilliputhur	1) D. K. Raja; 3) A. Vaikuntam	IND; INC	2) P. S. Kumaraswami Raja; 4) K. Arumugha Perumal	INC; IND
Talavasal	A. Sambasivam	INC	M. Gopala Chetty	IND
Tenkasi	Subramaniam Pillai	INC	Sevagupandia Thevar	IND
Thanjavur	1) M. Marimuthu; 2) S. Ramalingam	INC; CPI	3) R. Swaminatha Mercondar; 4) R. Shanmugan	INC; IND
Thirumangalam	K. Rajaram Naidu	INC	T. Manickavasakam	KMPP
Thondamuthur	Palaniswami Gounder	INC	Perumal	SP
Thousand lights	1) Venkataswami Naidu; 2) Sivashanmugam Pillai	INC; IND	3) Indirani Balasubramaniam; 4) Marthandam Pillai	JUSP; SP
Thuraiyur	P. Rangaswami Reddiar	IND	A. V. Rangaswami	INC
Tindivanam	1) M. Jagannathan; 2) Venugopala Gounder	TTP; TTP	3) Balasundaram; 4) Venkatakrishna Reddiar	INC; INC
Tiruchendur	1) Adityan; 2) V. Arumugam	KMPP; INC	3) Subramanya Adithan; 4) Pitchu	INC; SP
Tiruchengode	1) S. Arumugham; 2) T. S. Arthanari	IND; CPI	3) Radhabai Subbarayan; 4) V. K. Ramaswamy	INC; INC
Tiruchirapalli (North)	M. Kalayanasundaram	CPI	G. Ramaswami	INC
Tiruchirapalli (South)	Ramasamy	INC	Vaiyapuri Sholayar	IND
Tirukkoyilur	1) T. D. Muthukumaraswamy Naidu; 2) A. Muthuswami	TTP; TTP	3) Kulasekara Dass; 4) M. Rajagopal	INC; INC
Tirumayam	1) Palaniyappan; 3) Chinnayyaa	INC; TTP	2) Avudayappan Ambalakkarar; 4) Sambasiva Moopan	KMPP; INC
Tirunelveli	1) Arumugan; 2) S. N. Somayajulu	INC; INC	3) P. S. Subramania Pillai; 4) Shanmugam	IND; CPI
Tiruppur	Arumugam; Rangaswami Naidu	INC	Mathivanam; Ramaswami	CPI
Tirupattur (41)	E. L. Raghava Mudali	IND	R. C. Samanna Gounder	INC
Tiruppattur 194	Muthiah Chettiar	IND	Veerabhadran	CPI
Tirupporur	M. R. Ramachandran	INC	S. Murugesa Mudaliar	REP
Thiruvadanai	Chelladurai	IND	Arumugam Servai	INC
Tiruvallur	1) M. Dharmalingam; 2) V. Govindaswamy Naidu	KMPP; KMPP	3) N. Eagambara Mudaliar; 4) V. S. Arunachalam	INC; INC
Thiruvannamalai	1) Ramachandra Reddiar; 2) Thangavelu	INC; INC	3) Vadivelu Gounder; 4) T. V. Devaraja Mudaliar	CWP; IND
Triplicane	A. M. Sambandam	INC	M. S. Abdul Majeed	IND
Tuticorin	J. L. P. Roche Victoria	INC	K. V. P. Swamy	IND
Uddanappalli	P. N. Munuswamy	INC	A. N. Nallappa Reddy	KMPP
Udumalpet	Mounaguruswami Naidu	INC	Thangavelu	CPI
Ulundurpet	M. Kandaswamy Padayachi	INC	Natesa Gounder	TTP
Uthamapalayam	A. S. Subbaraj	INC	Muthaiah	SP
Uthiramerur	V. K. Ramaswami Mudaliar	INC	Duraisami Naicker	KMPP
Uthukuli	Palaniswami	IND	Kandasami Gounder	INC
Vadamadurai	Chinnaswamy Naidu	INC	Srinivasan	SP
Valappady	P. Kandasamy Gounder	IND	B. A. Rajarathnam	INC
Vandavasi	1) Somasundara Gounder; 2) Dasarathnam	CWP; SCF	3) Ramanuja Reddiar; 4) Velayuthapani	INC; INC
Vaniyambadi	A. K. Hanumantharaya Gounder	IND	M. Erusan	CWP
Vedasandur	V. Madanagopal	CPI	M. R. Krishnaswamy Reddiar	INC
Vellore	1) A. K. Masilamani Chettiar; 3) H. M. Jagnanathan	INC; INC	2) R. Radhakrishnan; 4) K. R. Sundaram	CWP; CPI
Vikravandi	Govindaswamy Nayagar	TTP	Bashyam Reddiar	INC
Vilathikulam	P. Selvaraj	INC	Sankaralingam	IND
Villupuram	Nagarajan	TTP	S. D. Chinnas	INC
Virudhunagar	V. V. Ramaswamy	IND	Sankarapandia Nadar	INC
Vridachalam	1) Paramasivam; 3) Kathimuthu	TTP; TTP	2) Narayanaswamy Pillai; 4) Vedamanickam	INC; INC
Wasermanpet	Jeevanandam	CPI	Radhakrishnan Pillai	INC

=== Andhra ===
Constituency	Winner	Party	Runner-up	Party
Salur	Kumisetti Venkatanarayana Dora	KLP	A. Yerukunaidu	INC
Cheepurupalli	Thaddi Chinna Atchanaidu	IND	Mudundi Satyanarayanaraju	IND
Bobbili	Kolli Venkata Kuruni Naidu	SP	Kothagiri Seetharamaswami	INC
Parvathipuram	Vyricherla Durgaprasad Veerabhadra Deo Bahadur	INC	Cheekati Parasuram Naidu	KLP
Srikakulam	Killi Appala Naidu	KLP	Kavali Narayana	KLP
Honjaram	Peesuputi Pundareekakshacharyulu	KLP	Chelikani Sreeranganayakulu	IND
Palakonda	Palavasa Sangam Naiudu	INC	Moosala Rajaratnam Naiudu	KLP
Narasannapeta	H. Satyanarayana Dora	INC	Kasira Basava Raju	KMPP
Pathapatnam	Lukulapu Lakshmanadas	INC	Darapu Govindarajulu	CPI
Tekkali	Rokkam Lakshmi Narasimham Dora	IND	Bandi Kurmanna	INC
Sompeta	Gouthu Latchanna	KLP	Pothuru Swamy Babu	INC
Ichapuram	Neeladri Rao Reddy	KLP	Harihara Patnaik	IND
Vizianagaram	Pusapati Vijayarama Gajapati Raju	SP	Gantlana Suryanarayana	SP
Bheemunipatnam	Kaligotla Suryanarayana	IND	J. V. K. Vallabha Rao	CPI
Alamanda	K. V. Padmanabha Raju	SP	G. B. Appa Rao	INC
Srungavarapukota	C. V. Somayajulu	SP	T. Venkataramanayya	INC
Chodavaram	Kandarpa Venkataramesam	KLP	Bhupathiraju Satyanarayana Raju	INC
Madugole	Bhojinki Gangayya Naidu	KLP	Ilapakurthy Satyanarayana	INC
Visakhapatnam	Tenneti Viswanatham	KMPP	S. Appala Nayudu	IND
Paravada	Mullapadi Veerabhadram	CPI	Gothimukkla Jagannatha Raju	IND
Anakapalle	Koduganti Govinda Rao	CPI	Villuri Venkataramana	KLP
Yelamanchili	Pappala Bapunaiudu	KLP	Missule Suryanarayanamoorthy	INC
Payakaraopeta	Raja Sagi Suryanarayana Raju	IND	Sunkari Appala Naiudu	INC
Golugonda	1) Killada Ramamurthy; 2) Kankipatti Veerana Padal	KLP; KLP	Puthala Latdha Patrudu	INC
Bhadrachalam	1) Karam Bapanna Dora; 2) Y. Venkata Krishna Rao	KMPP; KMPP	1) Varsavyi Venkata Thirupathi Raju; 2) Sivasam Bojji Dora	
Tuni	Raja Vatsavaya Venkata Krishnam Raju Bahadur	INC	Yenumula Venkanna Dora	KMPP
Pithapuram	R. V. Jagga Rao	CPI	R. Atachayya Rao	INC
Peddapuram	Thota Ramaswami	INC	D. V. Subba Rao	IND
Burugupudi	N. Venkatarama Rao	KLP	Marina Narasanna	INC
Rajamundry	Chitturi Prabhakara Chowdary	CPI	K. L. Narasimha Rao	INC
Kakinada	Chittajallu Venkata Krishna Rao	CPI	Kanteti Mohana Rao	CPI
Ramachandrapuram	Kakarlapudi Rajagopalanarasaraju	KMPP	Mallipudi Pallanraju	INC
Anaparti	Padala Satyanarayana Reddi	INC	P. Venkata Rao	CPI
Pamarru	S. B. P. Pattabhi Rama Rao	INC	P. Panasaramanna	CPI
Amalapuram	Nadimpalli Ramabhadra Raju	KMPP	Bojja Appalaswami	SCF
Razole	Alluri Venkataramaraju and Ganji Nagaswara Rao	CPI	Akula Buliswami	KMPP
Chintalapudi	Motaparithi Kunerao	CPI	Kamadana Venkatarama Surya Prakasa Rao	INC
Eluru	Garapaty Satyanarayana	CPI	Mulpuri Rengayya	INC
Tadepalligudem	C. S. Varaparasadamurthiraju	INC	Kilambi Venkata Krishnavataram	KMPP
Alampuram	Pasala Suryachandra Rao	KMPP	Thumalapalli Satyanarayanamurthy	INC
Undi	Dantuluri Narayana Raju	INC	Gottumukkala Venkata Raju	CPI
Bhimavaram	Bhupathiraju Subbaraju	KMPP	Nimmala Sangaiah Naidu	INC
Narsapur	Padela Symasundara Rao	CPI	Bhupathiraju Lakshminarasaraju	CPI
Tanuku	Chitturu Indrayya	KMPP	Chitturi Subba Rao	INC
Penugonda	Dwarampudi Basivireddy	KMPP	Nadimipilli Tirupathiraju	INC
Kovvur	1) Pinnamaneeni Sreeramachandra Rao	CPI	2) Alluri Bapineedu	INC
Jaggayapeta	Pillalamarvi Venkateswarlu	CPI	Bandi Timpatayya	INC
Vijayavada	Tammina Potharaju	CPI	Maru Pilla Chetti	INC
Kanchikacherla	Vasireddi Rama Rao	CPI	Kakani Venkatratnam	INC
Tiruvur	Peta Rama Rao	CPI	Peta Bappaiah	INC
Kankipadu	Myneni Lakshmanaswamy	CPI	Edupuganti Bala Veeraghavayya	KLP
Nuzvid	Raja Meka Rangayya Appa Rao Bahadur	INC	P. V. Raghavayya	IND
Gudivada	1) Gungi Rama Rao; 2) Katragadia Rajagopala Rao	CPI; CPI	3) A. Gopalakrishnayya; 4) Mangalagiri Ramdasu	IND; INC
Kaikalur	Adusnmolli Venkatasubramanyam	INC	Atluri Purnachalapathi Rao	CPI
Divi	1) Chandra Ramalingaiah; 2) Guntur Bapanayya	CPI; CPI	3) Sreemanthu Raja Yarlagadda Sivaram Prasad Bahadur; 4) Gattipati Brahmayya	IND; INC
Bandar	G. Anjeneyulu	CPI	R. Achyawnamaiah	INC
Vinukonda	Pulupula Venkatasivaiah	CPI	Paladugu Nagaiah Chowdhary	IND
Palnadu	Kola Subba Reddy	CPI	Kasu Brahmananda Reddy	INC
Bellamkonda	Mandava Bapaiah Chowdary	IND	Bojja Adinarayana Rao	INC
Narasaraopet	N. Nallapati Venkataramiah	KMPP	Kasu Vengal Reddy	INC
Chilakaluripet	Karnam Ranga Rao	CPI	Balineni Nagaiah	INC
Sattenpalle	V. Gopalakrishniah	IND	Jetti Ankamma	IND
Mangalagiri	Darsi Lakshmiah	CPI	Imgilapati Govinda Rao	KLP
Guntur	Nadimpalli Venkatalakshmi Narasimha Rao	KMPP	Yangalasetry Tirupattayya	CPI
Prathipadu	Tamma Kotamma Reddy	INC	Managva Seshayya	CPI
Duggirala	A. Rami Reddi	INC	K. Kotaiah	CPI
Tenali	Alapati Venkataramiah	INC	Rivissatyanarayana	KLP
Amarthalur	Gorikupudi Joseph	CPI	Velunolu Seetharamiah	INC
Repalle	M. Hanumantha Rao	CPI	Kalluri Chandramouli	INC
Bapatla	Vemmulapalli Srikrishna	INC	Nankena Venkataraju	CPI
Ponnur	Kolla Venkaiah	CPI	Coginam Lakshminarayana	KLP
Chirala	Pragada Kotaiah	KMPP	Uthukuri Upendra Gupta	IND
Ongole	Kasukurthi Malakondiah	CPI	Madala Narayannaswami	CPI
Gudur	Pelleti Gopalakrishna Reddy	INC	Katamareddy Raja Rami Reddy	IND
Venkatagiri	Padileti Venkatasami Reddy	INC	Katikinani Kalyan Rao	KLP
Rapur	D. Dasaratharamiah Naidu	INC	Ganga Ramanaiah	CPI
Nellore	1) Khandavalli Krishna Rao; 2)Swarna Vemayya	IND; IND	3) Anam Chenchu Subba Reddy; 4) Ponnaluru Veera Raghava Reddi	INC; IND
Kovur	Basavareddy Sankarayya	CPI	B. Seshu Reddy	INC
Atmakur	Ganga China Kondayya	IND	Gangavarapu Thirupathi Naidu	INC
Kavali	B. Ramakrishna Reddy	KMPP	R. Dasaratharami Reddy	INC
Udayagiri	Kovi Ramayya Chowdary	KMPP	Bezawada Gopala Reddy	INC
Kanigiri	Gujjala Yellamanda Reddy	CPI	Devi Reddy Lakhmi Reddy	INC
Kandukur	10 Nalamothu Chenchurama Naidu; 2) Kamatham Shanmugham	INC; INC	3) Chukka Kottilingam; 4) Guntapalli Venkatasubbiah	IND; IND
Darsi	Sanikommu Kasi Reddy	CPI	Ravipathi Mohanada	KLP
Markapuram	N. Venkatayya	KLP	Yekkali Ramaiah	IND
Cumbum	Pidathala Ranga Reddy	INC	Adapala Ramaswamy	IND
Nandyal	Mallu Subba Reddy	IND	G. Rami Reddy	INC
Koikuntla	N. Venkatasubba Reddy	SP	B. V. Subba Reddy	INC
Dhone	Venkatasetty Kotrike	IND	Venkatasubbiah Nivarthi	INC
Nandikottur	C. Pulla Reddy	CPI	Subba Reddy	INC
Kurnool	D. Sanjeevayya	INC	N. Sankara Reddy	INC
Rajampet	Panjam Narasimha Reddy	CPI	Bandam Ratnasabapathi Setti	SP
Rayachoti	Adinarayana Reddy	KMPP	Gurjala Reddayya Naidu	SP
Kadapa	K. Koti Reddy	INC	P. Seshiah Chetty	IND
Badvel	Vedamani Chidanandam	IND	Bommu Rama Reddy	INC
Proddatur	Kundala Balanarayana Reddy	INC	Panem Yonamani Reddy	KMPP
Kamalupuram	Narreddy Sivarami Reddy	CPI	Ramalinga Reddy	INC
Jammalamadugu	Kunda Ramiah	KMPP	Tatireddy Pulla Reddy	INC
Penukonda	Lakshminarayana Reddy	IND	Chitambara Reddy	INC
Hindupur	Sivasankara Reddy	INC	Sreenivasa Reddy	KMPP
Madakasira	Siddanna Goud	IND	Venkatasivamma	INC
Kadiri	K. V. Vema Reddy	INC	Y. Papireddy	IND
Dharmavaram	Srinivasalu Kasetty	KMPP	Venkatareddy Gonuguntla	INC
Kalyandrug	Narayanappa Sanda	INC	B. Yeniswamy	CPI
Tadpatri	C. Subbarayudu	KMPP	J. C. Nagi Reddy	INC
Anantapur	T. Nagi Reddy	CPI	N. Sanjeeva Reddy	INC
Adoni	H. Ramalinga Reddy	IND	T. Mallayya	INC
Rayadurg	G. Nagabushanam	INC	Mullangi Chinna Basappa Chowdary	IND
Chattu	T. N. Vankatasubba Reddy	INC	Alluru Narsinga Rao	IND
Madanapalle	Dodda Seetharamiah	CPI	Gudreddigari Srinivasareddy	IND
Punganur	B. Krishnamoorthy Rao	INC	Varanasi Raghunatha Reddy	IND
Pileru	P. Thimma Reddy	KLP	N. Bhaskara Reddy	INC
Palamaner	Ramabrahaman	INC	Soma Ram Reddy	KLP
Chittoor	Chinama Reddy	IND	N. P. Chengalraya Naidu	INC
Tiruttani	Kidambi Varadachari	INC	M. Dorai Kannu	INC
Puttur	Kumaraswami Rajah Bahadur	KMPP	R.B. Ramakrishna Raju	INC
Kalahasti	A. Balarami Reddy	INC	T. Venkatasubba Rao	KLP
Chandragiri	A. Adikesavalu Naidu	INC	V. Raja Reddy	IND

=== Mysore State ===
Winner, runner-up, voter turnout, and victory margin in every constituency
Assembly constituency		Turnout	Winner				Runner-up				Margin
#k	Names		Candidate	Party	Votes		Candidate	Party	Votes		Margin
1	Bellary	60.04	Mundlur Gangappa	Independent	19,534	43.37	A. Sumangalamma	INC	17,219	38.23	2,315
2	Brahmavar	67.83	S. S. Kolkabail	KMPP	22,719	51.76	Shetty Jagjeevandoss	INC	21,171	48.24	1,548
3	Kundapura	62.55	Manjayya Shetty	INC	24,847	55.41	V. Srinivasa Shetty	Socialist	19,994	44.59	4,853
4	Harapanahalli	66.50	Sirasappa Ijari	INC	26,425	51.13	K. B. R. Kotra Goud	Independent	25,261	48.87	1,164
5	Hospet	59.19	R. Nagana Gowda	INC	26,339	62.33	Mahabaleswarappa	Independent	10,349	24.49	15,990
6	Karkala	59.32	A. B. Shetty	INC	18,370	46.60	Dharmasamarajaya	KMPP	14,404	36.54	3,966
7	Kollegal	52.55	S. C. Virupakshiah	INC	19,696	59.52	C. R. Subramani Iyer	Independent	13,395	40.48	6,301
8	Kudligi	55.50	Kotrabasavana Goud	Independent	20,104	48.90	T. M. Panchakshariah	INC	11,764	28.62	8,340
9	Mangalore	61.15	L. C. Pais	INC	22,285	44.67	A. Shantha Ram Pai	CPI	13,818	27.70	8,467
10	Moodabidri	61.54	N. N. Suvarna	INC	26,381	62.47	Sanjeevanath	Socialist	8,562	20.28	17,819
11	Panemangalore	61.06	Bantwal Vaikunta Baliga	INC	18,369	44.09	D. K. H. Alwa	Independent	12,553	30.13	5,816
12	Puttur	59.77	K. Venkatramana Gowda	INC	42,735	87.52					
12	Puttur	59.77	K. Iswara	INC	42,299	86.62					
13	Siruguppa	54.87	S. Parameswarappa	INC	17,798	50.29	S. Ranganna Gowd	Independent	14,370	40.60	3,428
14	Udupi	68.77	T. A. Pai	INC	25,309	50.63	K. Rama Rao	KMPP	16,865	33.74	8,444
15	Coondapur	62.55	Manjayya Shetty	INC	24,847	55.41%	V. Srinivasa Shetty	Socialist	19,994	44.59%	4,853

=== Kerala ===
Malabar District during 1951 Census (Malabar district along with the Kasargod Region of South Canara district was merged in 1956 with Travancore-Cochin state to form Kerala)

Constituency	Winner	Party	Runner-up	Party
Kasaragod	M . S . Mogral	INC	B. K. Sridharan	KMPP
Hosdrug	Narayanan Nambiar	KMPP	Kunnikannan Nambiar	INC
Nattika	Gopalakrishnan	CPI	Raman	INC
Ponnani	N. Gopala Menon	INC	K. C. Sankarann	INC
Ponnani	E. T. Kunhan	CPI	A. C. Raman	KMPP
Tirur	K. Uppi Saheb	IUML	K. Ahmad Kutty	INC
Thrithala	K. B. Menon	SP	P. K. Moideen Kutty	INC
Perinthalmanna	Kunhimahamad Shafee Kallingal	IUML	P . Ahmad Kutty Sadhu	CPI
Mannarkkad	K. C. Gopalanunni	IND	Kurikal Ahmed	IND
Pattambi	V . Sankara Narayana Menon	KMPP	A . Ramachandra Nedungadi	INC
Ottapalam	M . Narayana Kurup	KMPP	C . P . Madhavan Nair	INC
Palakkad	K. ramakrishnan	IND	P. Vasu Menon	INC
Alathur	K. Krishnan	CPI	Y. R. Ramanatha Iyer	IND
Alathur	O. Koran	KMPP	E. Eacharan	INC
Malappuram	Miniyadam Chadayan	IUML	Karupadata Ibrahim	INC
Malappuram	Mohammad Haje Seethi	IUML	Kallayan Kunhambu	INC
Kottakkal	Chakkeeri Ahmad Kutty	IUML	Kunjunni Nedumgadi, Ezhuthassan Kalathil	INC
Kozhikode	K. P. Kutty Krishnan Nair	INC	E. M. S. Namboodiripad	CPI
Chevayur	A. Appu	INC	Ayyadhan Balagopalan	KMPP
Wayanad	Manyangode Padmanabha Gounder	SP	Kozhipurath Madhava Menon	INC
Wayanad	Chomadi Velukkan	SP	Veliyan Nocharamooyal	INC
Koyilandy	Chemmaratha Kunhriramakurup	KMPP	Anantapuram Patinhare Madam Vasudevan Nair	INC
Perambra	Kunhiram Kidavu Polloyil	KMPP	Kalandankutty, Puthiyottil	INC
Vadakara	Moidu Keloth	SP	Ayatathil Chattu	INC
Nadapuram	E . K . Sankara Varma Raja	INC	K . Thacharakandy	CPI
Thalassery	C. H. M. Kanaran	CPI	K. P. M. Raghavan Nair	INC
Kuthuparamba	Krishna Iyer	IND	Harindranabham, Kalliyat Thazhathuveethil	SP
Mattanur	Madhavan Nambiar, Kallorath	CPI	Subbarao	INC
Kannur	Kariath Sreedharan	KMPP	Pamban Madhavan	INC
Taliparamba	T. C. Narayanan Nambiar	CPI	V. V. Damodaran Nayanar	INC
Payyanur	K. P. Gopalan	CPI	Vivekananda Devappa Sernoy	INC

== Delimitation and reorganisation ==
On 1 October 1953, a separate Andhra State consisting of the Telugu-speaking areas of the composite Madras State was formed and the Kannada-speaking area of Bellary District was merged with the then Mysore State. This reduced the strength of the Legislative Assembly to 231.

On 1 November 1956, Madras State was re-organized as per States Reorganisation Act, 1956. Malabar District of the State was transferred to the new State of Kerala, and a new union territory, Laccadive, Minicoy and Amindivi Islands, was carved out. The southern part (Tamil-speaking area) of Travancore-Cochin (present day Kanyakumari district) and Shenkottah taluk were merged into the State. Later in 1968, the state was renamed as Tamil Nadu. This led to re-organization of legislative assembly constituencies during 1957 assembly elections in the State.

The strength of the Madras Legislative Assembly was increased to 205 in accordance with the new Delimitation of Parliamentary and Assembly Constituencies Order 1956, made by the Delimitation Commission of India under the provisions of the State Reorganisation Act, 1956. The 1957 elections were conducted for these 205 seats.

== See also ==
- Elections in Tamil Nadu
- Elections in Andhra Pradesh
- Elections in Kerala
- Legislature of Tamil Nadu
- Government of Tamil Nadu
