= Madras Kali Bari =

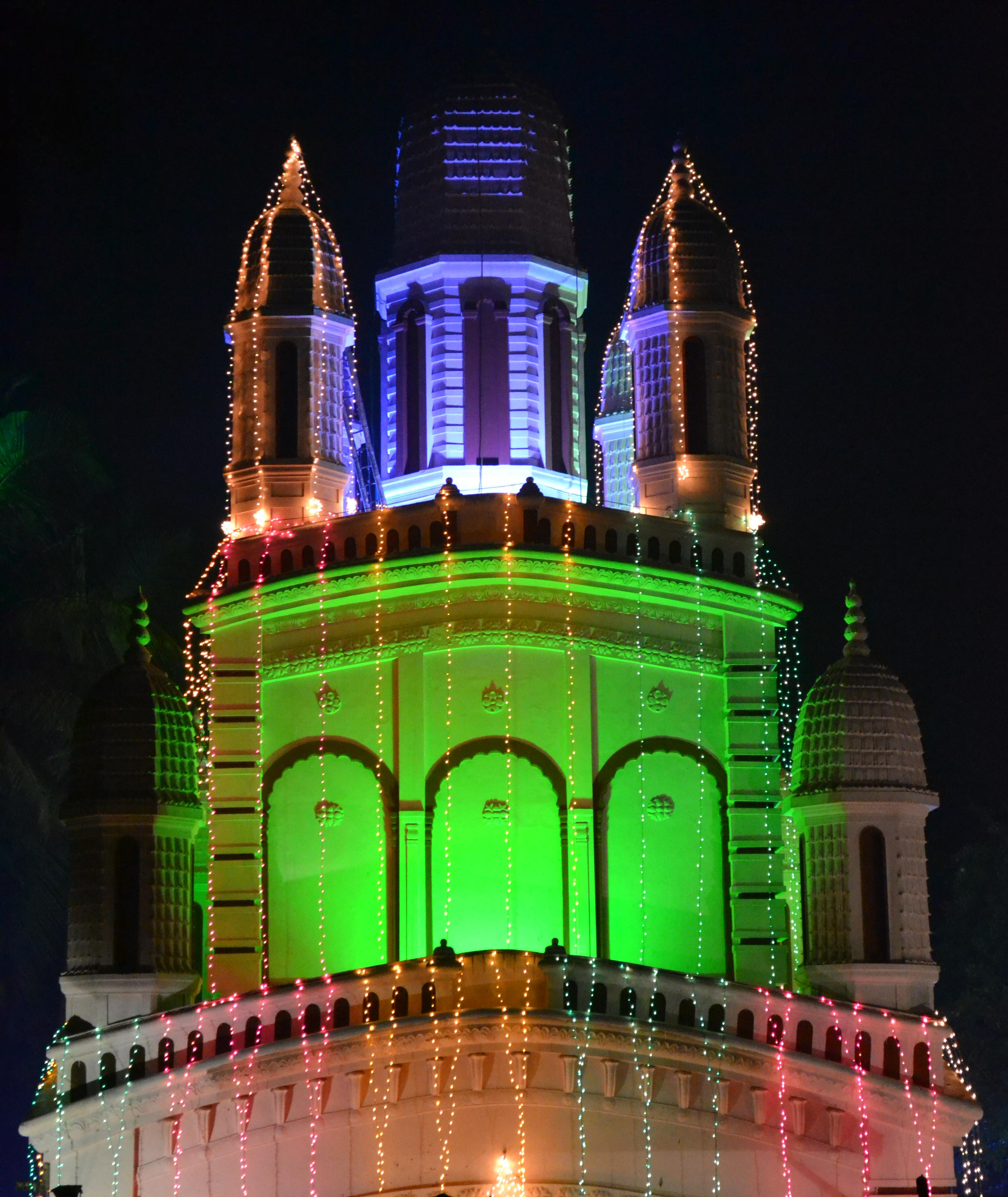
- The Kali Bari temple during Navaratri

Religion
- Affiliation: Hinduism
- District: Chennai
- Deity: goddess Kali

Location
- Location: Chennai
- State: Tamil Nadu
- Country: India

Architecture
- Completed: 1981

Madras Kali Bari is a Hindu temple located in the neighbourhood of West Mambalam in Chennai, India. Dedicated to the goddess Kali, the temple is constructed along the lines of the Dakshineshwar Kali temple in Kolkata by the Bengali community in the city. Within the precincts of the temple is a meditation hall where bhajans are sung daily. Hindu festivals like Durga Puja and Kali Puja are celebrated with grandeur.

== See also ==
- Religion in Chennai
