= Eluru Assembly constituency =

Constituency of the Andhra Pradesh Legislative Assembly, India

Coordinates: 16.72°N 81.09°E

Eluru
- Constituency No. 65 for the Andhra Pradesh Legislative Assembly
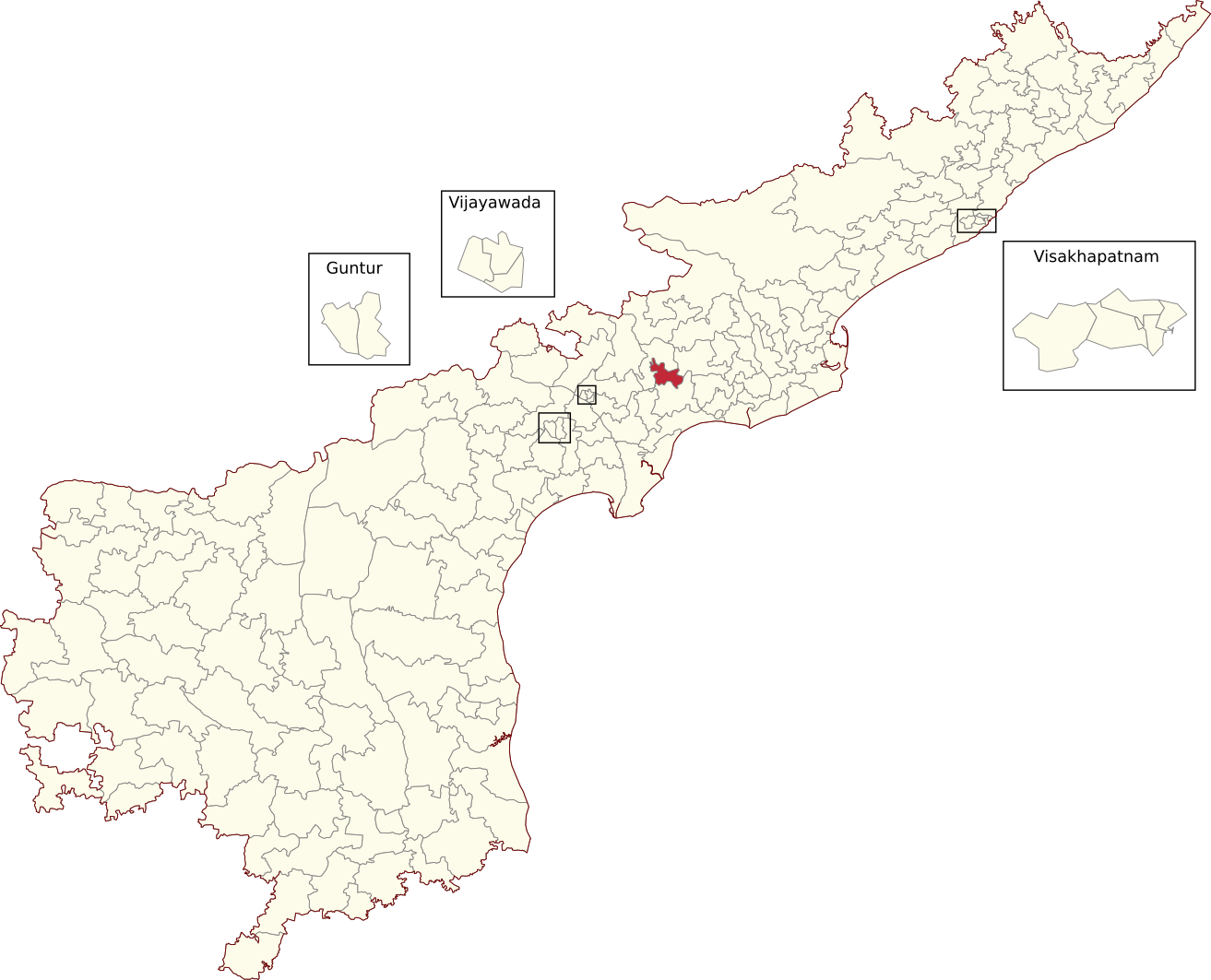
- Location of Eluru Assembly constituency within Andhra Pradesh

Constituency details
- Country: India
- Region: South India
- State: Andhra Pradesh
- District: Eluru
- Lok Sabha constituency: Eluru
- Established: 1951
- Total electors: 238,807
- Reservation: None

Member of Legislative Assembly
- 16th Andhra Pradesh Legislative Assembly
- Incumbent Radha Krishnayya Badeti
- Party: TDP
- Alliance: NDA
- Elected year: 2024

Eluru Assembly constituency is a constituency in Eluru district of Andhra Pradesh that elects representatives to the Andhra Pradesh Legislative Assembly in India. It is one of the seven assembly segments of Eluru Lok Sabha constituency.

Radha Krishnayya Badeti is the current MLA of the constituency, having won the 2024 Andhra Pradesh Legislative Assembly election from Telugu Desam Party. The constituency was established in 1951, as per the Delimitation Orders (1951).

== Mandals ==
Eluru Assembly constituency consists of

Mandal
Eluru mandal
Eluru Municipal Corporation (Ward No.1 to 50)

== Members of the Legislative Assembly ==
Year	Member	Political party
1952	Garapati Satyanarayana	Communist Party of India
1955	Seerla Brahmayya	Indian National Congress
1962	Attuluri Sarwesvara Rao	Communist Party of India
1967	M. Venkatanarayana	Indian National Congress
1972	Amanaganti Sriramulu	Independent
1978	Nalabati Surya Prakasa Rao	Indian National Congress (I)
1983	Chennakesavulu Ranga Rao	Telugu Desam Party
1985	Maradani Ranga Rao	Telugu Desam Party
1989	Nerella Raja	Indian National Congress
1994	Maradani Ranga Rao	Telugu Desam Party
1999	Ambica Krishna	Telugu Desam Party
2004	Alla Kali Krishna Srinivas (Alla Nani)	Indian National Congress
2009	Alla Kali Krishna Srinivas (Alla Nani)	Indian National Congress
2014	Badeti Kota Rama Rao (Bujji)	Telugu Desam Party
2019	Alla Kali Krishna Srinivas (Alla Nani)	YSR Congress Party
2024	Radha Krishnayya Badeti	Telugu Desam Party

== Election results ==
=== 1952 ===
1952 Madras Legislative Assembly election: Eluru
Party	Candidate	Votes	%	±%
CPI	Garapaty Satyanarayana	20,545	39.95%	
INC	Mulpuri Rengayya	12,911	25.11%	25.11%
Independent	Munapati China Kanakayya	10,911	21.22%	
KMPP	Veeramachaneni Venkatanarayana	5,229	10.17%	
Independent	Rajanela Gopala Rao Naiudu	977	1.90%	
Socialist Party (India)	Polapragada Satyakaladevi	849	1.65%	
Margin of victory		7,634	14.85%	
Turnout		51,422	72.13%	
Registered electors		71,289		
CPI win (new seat)				

=== 2004 ===
2004 Andhra Pradesh Legislative Assembly election: Eluru
Party	Candidate	Votes	%	±%
INC	Alla Kali Krishna Srinivas(Alla Nani)	72,490	63.86	+18.91
TDP	Maradani Ranga Rao	39,437	34.74	−17.49
Majority		33,053	29.12	
Turnout		113,509	65.15	+2.60
INC gain from TDP		Swing		

=== 2009 ===
2009 Andhra Pradesh Legislative Assembly election: Eluru
Party	Candidate	Votes	%	±%
INC	Alla Kali Krishna Srinivas(Alla Nani)	49,962	39.80	−24.06
PRP	Badeti Kota Rama Rao	36,280	28.90	−18.37
TDP	Ambica Krishna	32,755	26.09	−8.65
Majority		13,682	10.90	
Turnout		125,527	73.26	+8.11
INC hold		Swing		

=== 2014 ===
2014 Andhra Pradesh Legislative Assembly election: Eluru
Party	Candidate	Votes	%	±%
TDP	Badeti Kota Rama Rao	82,483	55.68	
YSRCP	Alla Kali Krishna Srinivas	57,880	39.07	
Majority		24,603	16.61	
Turnout		148,133	71.61	−1.65
TDP gain from INC		Swing		

=== 2019 ===
2019 Andhra Pradesh Legislative Assembly election: Eluru
Party	Candidate	Votes	%	±%
YSRCP	Alla Kali Krishna Srinivas	72,247	44.73	
TDP	Badeti Kota Rama Rao	68,175	42.21	
JSP	Appala Naidu Reddy	16,681	10.3	
Majority		4,072	2.52	
Turnout		159,680	66.86	−4.75
YSRCP gain from TDP		Swing		

=== 2024 ===
2024 Andhra Pradesh Legislative Assembly election: Eluru
Party	Candidate	Votes	%	±%
TDP	Radha Krishnayya Badeti	111,562	67.09	
YSRCP	Alla Kali Krishna Srinivas	49,174	29.57	
CPI	Bandi Venkateswara Rao	604	0.36	
NOTA	None Of The Above	1256	0.76	
Majority		62388	37.52	
Turnout		166257		
TDP gain from YSRCP		Swing		

== See also ==
- List of constituencies of Andhra Pradesh Legislative Assembly
