= H. B. Ari Gowder =

Rao Bahadur Hubbathalai Bellie Gowder Ari Gowder(ari gowda)

Member of Legislative Assembly of Madras state

Member of Madras Legislative Council
- In office 1930–1934

Member of Madras Legislative Council
- In office 1923–1926

Personal details
- Born: 4 December 1893 Hubbatale, Madras Presidency
- Died: 28 June 1971 (aged 78)
- Spouse: Gauri (Jakkadha)
- Education: Madras Christian College
- Occupation: legislator

Rao Bahadur Hubbathalai Bellie Ari Gowder (ari gowda)(4 December 1893 – 28 June 1971) was a leader and the first member of the Badaga community to be elected to the Madras Legislative Council.

== Birth and early life ==
H. J. Bellie Gowder at Hubbathalai on 4 December 1893. Bellie Gowder was an engineering contractor of Nilgiris who constructed the Nilgiri Mountain Railway.

== Politics and public life ==
Ari Gowder was educated at the Madras Christian College before entering politics. He became the first person to be elected to the Madras Legislative Council. He served as a member of the Madras Legislative Council from 1923 to 1926 and from 1930 to 1934 and was a member of the Legislative Assembly of Madras state in the 1940s and 1950s. He also served a President of the Nilgiris District Board. When prohibition was introduced in 1937, Ari Gowder was instrumental in enforcing prohibition in the Nilgiris district. He led the Indian contingent to the World Scouts Jumboree in Hungary in 1930.

== Philanthropic activities ==
Ari Gowder established the Nilgiris Co-operative Marketing Society in Ooty, The Nilgiris District and a branch at Mettupalayam in 1941 and served as its president until his death in 1971. The main purpose of the Nilgiris Co-operative Marketing Society was to guarantee the rights of cultivators from being exploited by middlemen. Recognising his contribution to the Society, as bust of Ari Gowder was unveiled in the hall of NCMS on 25 May 1987

Rao Bahadur Hubbathalai J Bellie Gowder, made his fortune in laying the tracks of the Nilgiri Mountain Railway, which was completed in 1908. His wealth made him a leading member of his community, and his clansmen came to him for advice on several issues. Bellie Gowder founded a free school in his native village, Hubbathalai, an institution that still functions. He died in 1935.

== Death and legacy ==
Ari Gowder died on 28 June 1971. He is highly regarded by members of the Nilgiris community who regard him as their patriarch. A bridge constructed in 1939 at Masinagudi linking the then Madras Presidency with the kingdom of Mysore was named Ari Gowder Bridge.

The portion of West Mambalam, Chennai which adjoins the Mambalam railway station was gifted to the Government of Tamil Nadu by Ari Gowder and the road which runs parallel to the railway line is named Arya Gowder(gowda)Road in his honor.

He was succeeded by his son H. A. Bhojraj who was a golfer and philanthropist. Ari Gowder's first great great grandson was born in October 2017 and is named Ari Vigneshwar.
