= Badeti Chanti =

Indian politician from Andhra Pradesh

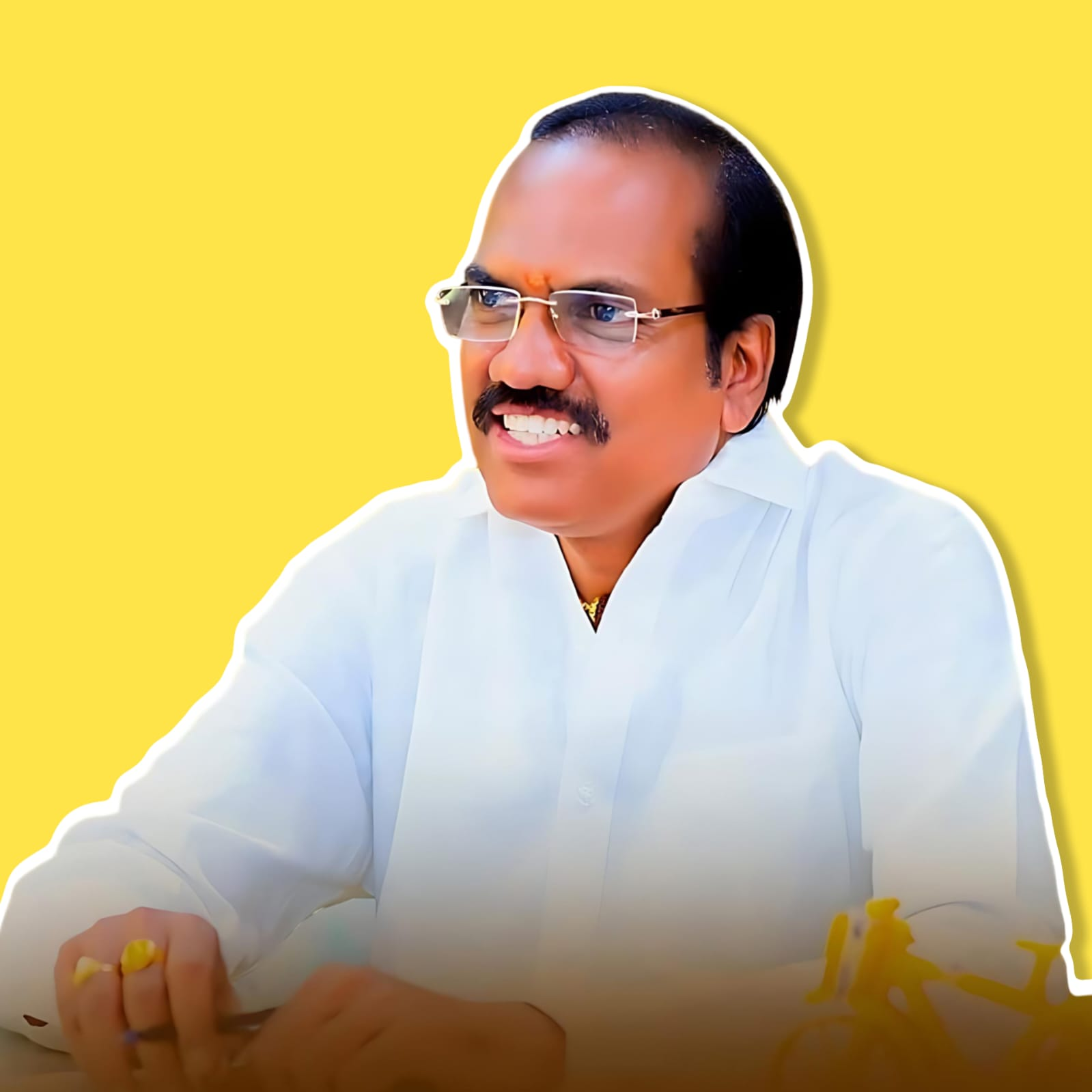

Member of Legislative Assembly, Andhra Pradesh
- Incumbent
- Assumed office 4 June 2024
- Preceded by: Alla Nani
- Constituency: Eluru

Personal details
- Born: February 12, 1967 (age 59) Eluru
- Party: Telugu Desam Party
- Relatives: S. V. Ranga Rao (uncle); Badeti Bujji (brother)

Badeti Radha Krishnayya commonly known as Badeti Chanti is an Indian politician from Andhra Pradesh. He is a member of Telugu Desam Party.

== Political career ==
Badeti Radha Krishnayya was elected as the Member of the Legislative Assembly representing the Eluru Assembly constituency in 2024 Andhra Pradesh Legislative Assembly elections. He won the elections by a margin of 62388 votes defeating Alla Kali Krishna Srinivas of the YSR Congress Party.

== Electoral performance ==
2024 Andhra Pradesh Legislative Assembly election: Eluru
Party	Candidate	Votes	%	±%
TDP	Radha Krishnayya Badeti	111,562	67.09	
YSRCP	Alla Kali Krishna Srinivas	49,174	29.57	
CPI	Bandi Venkateswara Rao	604	0.36	
NOTA	None Of The Above	1256	0.76	
Majority		62388	37.52	
Turnout		166257		
TDP gain from YSRCP		Swing		
