= Alla Nani =

Indian politician (1969–2026)

8th Deputy Chief Minister of Andhra Pradesh
- In office 8 June 2019 – 7 April 2022 Serving with Amzath Basha Shaik Bepari; K. Narayana Swamy; Pilli Subhash Chandra Bose; Pamula Pushpa Sreevani; Dharmana Krishna Das
- Governor: E. S. L. Narasimhan; Biswabhusan Harichandan
- Chief Minister: Y. S. Jagan Mohan Reddy
- Preceded by: Nimmakayala Chinarajappa; K. E. Krishnamurthy
- Succeeded by: Budi Mutyala Naidu

Minister for Health, Family welfare and Medical Education Government of Andhra Pradesh
- In office 8 June 2019 – 7 April 2022
- Governor: E. S. L. Narasimhan; Biswabhusan Harichandan
- Chief Minister: Y. S. Jagan Mohan Reddy
- Succeeded by: Vidadala Rajini

Member of Legislative Assembly Andhra Pradesh
- In office 2019–2024
- Preceded by: Badeti Kota Rama Rao
- Succeeded by: Badeti Radha Krishnayya
- Constituency: Eluru
- In office 2004–2014
- Preceded by: Ambica Krishna
- Succeeded by: Badeti Kota Rama Rao
- Constituency: Eluru

Member of Legislative Council Andhra Pradesh
- In office 2017–2019
- Constituency: Elected by MLAs

Personal details
- Born: Alla Kali Krishna Srinivas; 30 December 1969
- Died: 15 September 2026 (aged 56) Visakhapatnam, Andhra Pradesh, India
- Party: Telugu Desam Party (2025–2026); YSR Congress Party (2013–2024); Indian National Congress (until 2013)

Alla Kali Krishna Srinivas (30 December 1969 – 15 September 2026), commonly known as Alla Nani, was an Indian politician. He served as the Deputy Chief Minister of Andhra Pradesh from 2019 to 2022.

== Political career ==
Nani was a legislator in the Andhra Pradesh Legislative Assembly from Eluru constituency between 2004 and 2013, as a member of the Indian National Congress. He resigned as MLA from Congress and joined the YSR Congress Party (YSRCP) in 2013. He contested for the YSRCP in the 2014 elections but lost. He became MLC in 2017 and again contested MLA from Eluru and was re-elected as MLA in the 2019 elections from YSRCP and he became the Deputy Chief Minister and Minister of Health and Family Welfare, Medical Education in Y. S. Jagan Mohan Reddy's cabinet in Andhra Pradesh.

On 9 August 2024, he tendered his resignation to the YSRCP and announced his exit from politics.

On 13 February 2025, he joined Telugu Desam Party.

== Death ==
Nani died from a heart attack at a private hospital in Visakhapatnam, on 15 September 2026, at the age of 56.
