= Guntur Bapanaiah =

Indian politician

- గుంటూరు బాపనయ్యకు

Member of the Andhra Pradesh Legislative Assembly for Nidumolu
- Incumbent
- Assumed office 1962, 1978

Member of the Madras Legislative Assembly for Divi
- In office 1951–1953
- Preceded by: (none - new assembly)
- Succeeded by: (none - assemblies split)

Personal details
- Born: 1919
- Died: March 25, 1978 (aged 58–59)
- Party: Communist Party of India (Marxist) (1964-1978); Communist Party of India (1930s-1964)

Guntur Bapanaiah (1919 - March 25, 1978) was an Indian politician, Dalit leader, freedom fighter, and founding member of the Communist Party of India (Marxist) party after it split from the Communist Party of India in 1964. In the 1930s, he became an active member of the Communist Party and joined the associated Raitu Coolie Sangham agricultural labour organization in 1939. He helped organize peasant movements in Challapalli Estate in 1938 and 1950 and was, at one time, general secretary of the Andhra Provincial Agricultural Labourers Association. He was elected as a member of the Madras Legislative Assembly for the Divi constituency in 1951 and of the Andhra Pradesh Legislative Assembly for the Nidumolu constituency in 1962 and 1978.

Bapanaiah died on March 25, 1978, not long after the election, and was replaced in the Assembly by his wife.
