= Adirampattinam Assembly constituency =

Former constituency of the Tamil Nadu Legislative Assembly

Coordinates: 10.34°N 79.38°E

Adirampattinam
- Former constituency for the Tamil Nadu Legislative Assembly

Constituency details
- Country: India
- Region: South India
- State: Tamil Nadu
- District: Thanjavur
- Lok Sabha constituency: Thanjavur
- Established: 1951
- Abolished: 1962
- Total electors: 89,616
- Reservation: None

Adirampattinam was a state assembly constituency in the Indian state of Tamil Nadu. It was in existence from the 1951 delimitation to 1962 state elections.

== Members of the Legislative Assembly ==
Election	Member	Party
1952	S. Venkatarama Iyer	Indian National Congress
1956 By-election	V. Vairava Thevar	Indian National Congress
1957	A. R. Marimuthu	Praja Socialist Party
1962	Dhandayuthapani Pillai	Indian National Congress

Madras State

== Election results ==
=== Assembly election 1962 ===
1962 Madras State Legislative Assembly election : Adirampattinam
Party	Candidate	Votes	%	±%
INC	Dhandayuthapani Pillai	31,503	47.33%	▲15.23
PSP	A. R. Marimuthu	26,104	39.22%	▼11.37
CPI	Subbiah Mudippoondar	8,949	13.45%	New
Margin of victory		5,399	8.11%	▼10.38
Turnout		68,949	76.94%	▲13.84
Total valid votes		66,556		
Registered electors		89,616		▲6.80
INC gain from PSP		Swing	▼3.26	

=== Assembly election 1957 ===
1957 Madras State Legislative Assembly election : Adirampattinam
Party	Candidate	Votes	%	±%
PSP	A. R. Marimuthu	26,785	50.59%	
INC	N. Sundaresa Thevar	16,995	32.10%	
Independent	N. Sriram Elango	9,166	17.31%	
Margin of victory		9,790	18.49%	
Turnout		52,946	63.10%	
Total valid votes		52,946		
Registered electors		83,913		
PSP gain from INC		Swing		

=== Assembly by-election 1956 ===
1956 Madras State Legislative Assembly by-election : Adirampattinam
Party	Candidate	Votes	%	±%
INC	V. Vairava Thevar	Unopposed		
INC hold		Swing		

=== Assembly election 1952 ===
1952 Madras State Legislative Assembly election : Adirampattinam
Party	Candidate	Votes	%	±%
INC	S. Venkatarama Iyer	21,461	47.75%	New
CPI	K. Muthiah	15,072	33.54%	New
Independent	Sundara Rajan Servaikarar	8,409	18.71%	New
Margin of victory		6,389	14.22%	
Turnout		44,942	60.93%	
Total valid votes		44,942		
Registered electors		73,756		
INC win (new seat)				
