= S. Venkatarama Iyer =

Indian politician

Member of the Madras State Assembly
- In office 1952–1957
- Preceded by: K. Muthiah
- Constituency: Adirampattinam

Personal details
- Party: Indian National Congress

S. Venkatarama Iyer was an Indian politician and former Member of the Legislative Assembly of Tamil Nadu. He was elected to the Tamil Nadu legislative assembly as an Indian National Congress candidate from Adirampattinam constituency in 1952 election.
