= Dhandayuthapani Pillai =

Indian politician

M.Dhandayuthapani was an Indian politician and former Member of the Legislative Assembly of Tamil Nadu. He was elected to the Tamil Nadu legislative assembly as an Indian National Congress candidate from Adirampattinam constituency in 1962 election. He was a Politician from Thanjavur district who held several organisational positions in the Indian National Congress and Tamil Maanila Congress (Moopanar). He served as President of the Youth Congress Committee, Pattukkottai, from 1959 to 1960, and subsequently as President of the Taluk Congress Committee, Pattukkottai, from 1960 onwards. He also served as a Director of the Pattukkottai Cooperative Marketing Society and as a Trustee of Sri Mandirapuri Eswaraswami Devasthanam, Kovilur, in Tiruthuraipoondi Taluk.

He was among the prominent leaders of the Tamil Nadu Congress Committee (TNCC) from Thanjavur district and maintained close political associations with former Tamil Nadu Chief Minister K. Kamaraj, former President of India Ramaswamy Venkataraman, and senior Congress leader G. K. Moopanar.

He contested the Tamil Nadu Legislative Assembly elections in 1967 and 1971 from the Orathanad Assembly constituency. During his tenure as a Member of the Legislative Assembly (MLA), he also served as Acting Speaker of the Tamil Nadu Legislative Assembly and presided over the proceedings of the Tamil Nadu Legislative Assembly on several occasions.

He passed away in 2016.
