= Ayodhya Mandapam =

Congregation hall

Coordinates: 13.039076°N 80.221007°E

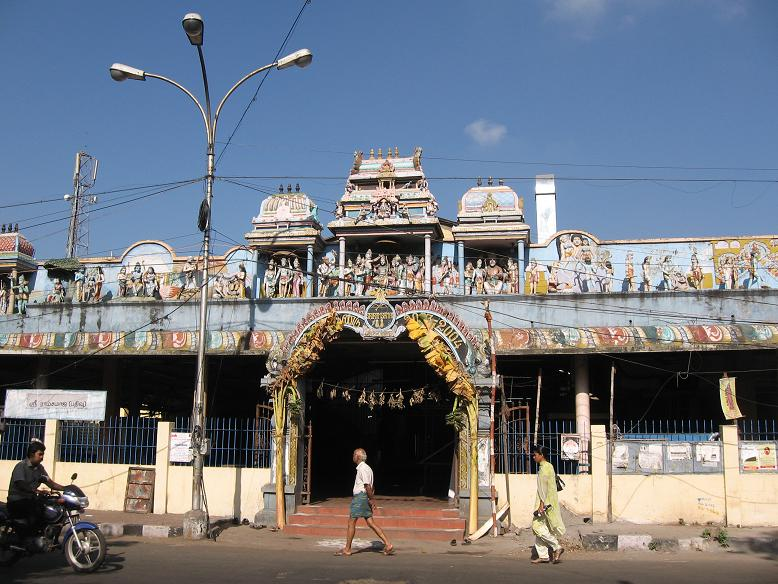
The Ayodhya Mandapam Entrance At West Mambalam

Ayodhya Mandapam is a common meeting hall type of building-structure specifically made for the purpose of sath-sangamam (association of like-minded or common interest on religious development/discourses) at West Mambalam, Chennai, India. The mandapam is managed by Sri Ram Samaj. who also operate Mithilapuri Kalyana Mandapam - a marriage hall, Sri Sitaram Vidyalaya school and Gnanavapi - a place for conducting funeral rites.

The Mandapam was constructed in 1964 and initially it was open to the Iyers of Mambalam (a set of Brahmin Community). Later it was made available for all the other communities. Till now it is known for the association/meeting point for Brahmin community.

Periodic discourses on Vedas and Upanishads as well as several cultural meet-outs are handled throughout the year. In the month of March–April of every year, programmes in connection to Rama Navami Maha-utsav is very special at Ayodhya Mandapam.

In January 2014, this society was taken over by HR & CE department of Tamil Nadu Government. After protest by the general public/ the Chief Justice of Madras High Court stayed the proceedings of the Tamil Nadu Government. As usual Sri Ram Samaj is managed by the committee appointed by General Body of Sri Ram Samaj. Sri Ram Samaj is a registered society, managed by the elected body of 15 people. It consists of the President, Vice President, Secretary, Asst. Secretary and the Treasurer.
