= Badeti Bujji =

Indian politician (c.1964–2019)

Badeti Kota Rama Rao

Member of Legislative Assembly, Andhra Pradesh
- In office 2014–2019
- Preceded by: Alla Kali Krishna Srinivas
- Succeeded by: Alla Kali Krishna Srinivas
- Constituency: Eluru

Personal details
- Born: 12 July 1964
- Died: 26 December 2019 (aged 55)
- Party: Telugu Desam Party
- Relatives: S. V. Ranga Rao (uncle); Badeti Chanti (brother)

Badeti Kota Rama Rao (12 July 1964 – 26 December 2019), known as Badeti Bujji, was an Indian politician from Andhra Pradesh belonging to Telugu Desam Party. He was a legislator of the Andhra Pradesh Legislative Assembly. He was known as Badeti Bujji.

== Biography ==
After passing Higher Secondary School Certificate Bujji was admitted into Sir C. R. Reddy College but did not continue his studies. He contested in 2009 as a Praja Rajyam Party candidate from Eluru but he lost to Alla Kali Krishna Srinivas. He was elected as a legislator of the Andhra Pradesh Legislative Assembly from Eluru in 2014 as a Telugu Desam Party candidate. He also contested in 2019 as a Telugu Desam Party candidate from Eluru but he lost to Alla Kali Krishna Srinivas.

Bujji died of heart attack on 26 December 2019 at the age of 55.
