= K. Rajaram Naidu =

Indian politician (1909–1985)

Tamil Nadu Minister of Local administration
- In office 1953–1954
- Chief Minister: C. Rajagopalachari
- Constituency: Tirumangalam

President of Tamil Nadu Congress Committee
- In office 1957–1959
- Preceded by: O. V. Alagesan
- Succeeded by: P. Kakkan

Personal details
- Born: 8 February 1909 Achampatti, Tirumangalam, Madurai
- Died: 28 January 1985 (aged 75)
- Party: Indian National Congress
- Spouse: Baakiyalakshmi
- Children: 3

K. Rajaram Naidu (08 February 1909 – 28 January 1985) was an Indian freedom fighter and politician. He was the State President of Tamil Nadu Congress Committee from 1957 to 1959.

== Early life ==
Rajaram Naidu was born into a Telugu family to Krishnama Naidu and Thirumalammal on 08 February 1909 in Achampatti village of Madurai district, Tamil Nadu. He belongs to the Velama community, whose family has been involved in agriculture.

== Career ==
Rajaram Naidu stood in the Madras Assembly elections held in 1946 and was elected. In the 1952 Assembly elections, the first in independent India, he won the Tirumangalam seat and re-entered the Assembly. He was appointed the Local administration Minister in the Rajaji' cabinet. Later, He served as first Leader of the Opposition in the Tamil Nadu Legislative Council.

== Died ==
He died on 28 January 1985.
