= Palavoor =

Village in Tamil Nadu, India

- Village
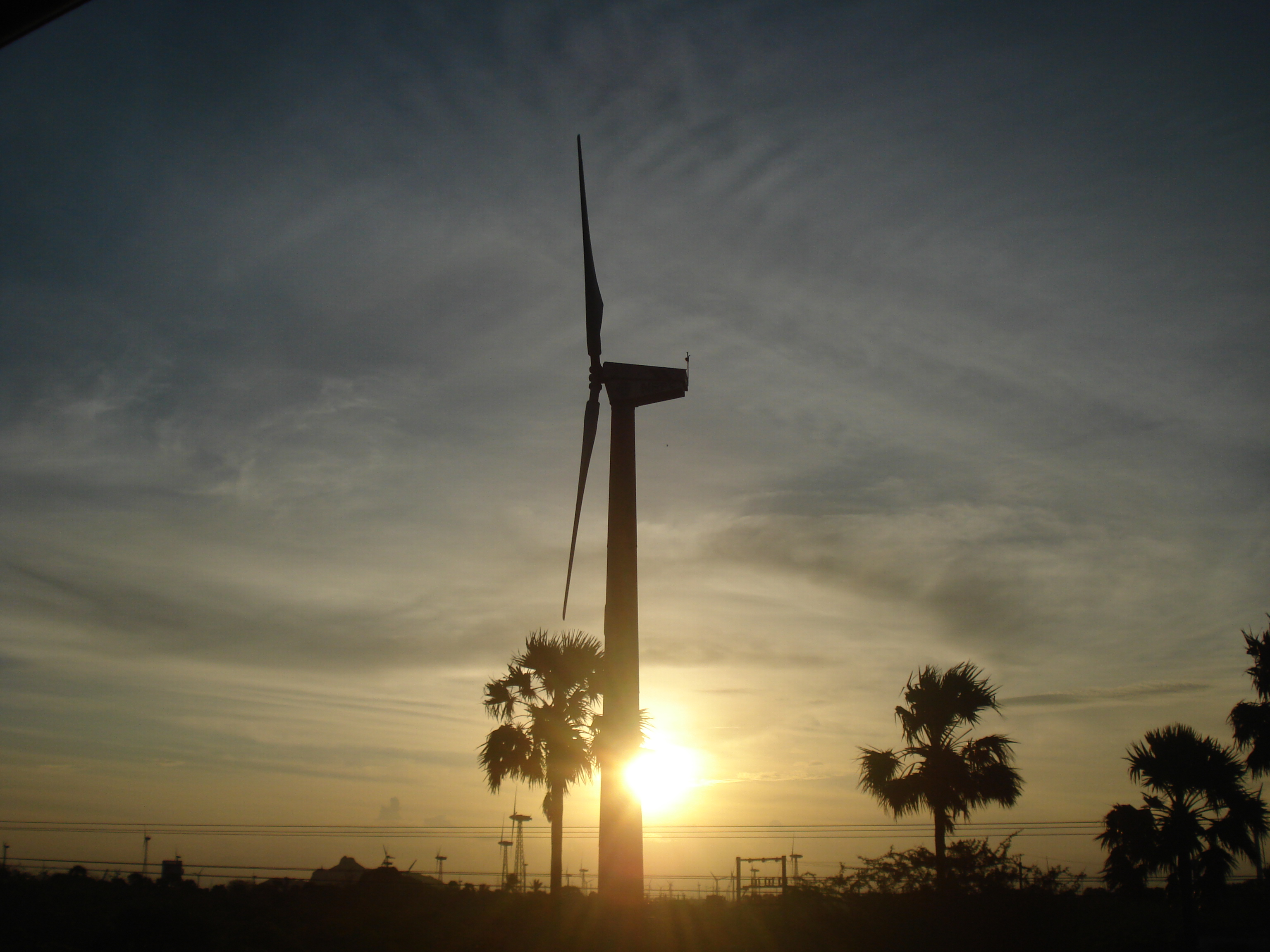
- Sunset in the southern part of the village

- Location within Tamil Nadu Location within India
- Coordinates: 08°12′20″N 77°34′21″E
- Country: India
- State: Tamil Nadu
- District: Tirunelveli
- Taluk: Radhapuram

Government
  - Type: Gram Panchayat

Area
  - Total: 38.85 km^{2} (15.00 sq mi)
- Elevation: 53 m (174 ft)

Population (2011)
  - Total: 17,780
  - Density: 457.7/km^{2} (1,185/sq mi)

Languages
  - Official: Tamil
- Time zone: UTC+5:30 (IST)
- PIN: 627114
- STD code: 04637
- Vehicle registration: TN-72

Palavoor is a village in Radhapuram Taluk, Tirunelveli District, Tamil Nadu, India. It is located near the coast of the Indian Ocean, about 60 kilometres south of the district seat Tirunelveli and 14 kilometres southwest of the taluk seat Radhapuram. In 2011, the village had a total population of 17,780.

== Geography ==
Palavoor is located to the south of Vadakupathu Kulam, with National Highway 44 passing through it. The average elevation of the village is 53 meters above sea level.

== Demographics ==
According to the 2011 Indian Census, Palavoor has 4,611 households. Among the 17,780 residents, 8,837 are male and 8,943 are female. The overall literacy rate is 79.67%, with 7,252 of the male inhabitants and 6,914 of the female inhabitants being literate. The census location code of the village is 643085.
