= West Mambalam =

West Mambalam West Mambalam
- neighbourhood
- Mambalam, Chennai Mambalam, Tamil Nadu Mambalam, India
- Coordinates: 13°02′17″N 80°13′20″E
- Country: India
- State: Tamil Nadu
- District: Chennai
- Taluk: Mambalam
- Metro: Chennai
- Zone: Kodambakkam
- Ward: 133,135,140
- Elevation: 35 m (115 ft)

Languages
  - Official: Tamil
- Time zone: UTC+5:30 (IST)
- PIN: 600033
- Vehicle registration: TN-09
- Lok Sabha constituency: Chennai South
- Legislative Assembly constituency: T. Nagar Saidapet

West Mambalam is a residential and commercial area in Chennai, India. It is known for its shops, bazaars and Hindu temples. It is bounded by Kodambakkam to the north and Saidapet to the south. T. Nagar and Nandanam stretch along its entire eastern frontier while Ashok Nagar lies to its west. The Ayodhya Mandapam is an important landmark.

== Etymology ==
Mambalam is believed to have derived its name from the existence of Maha vilvam trees in the locality, which in due course become Mavilam and then Mambalam.

Alternatively, in ancient times it was descriptively known as Mylai mel ambalam (place located on the west of Mylai). It was shortly referred as mel-ambalam, finally converging colloquially over time as Mambalam.

With the Mambalam railway line dividing the locality into East Mambalam and West Mambalam, and with East Mambalam having renamed as "Thyagaraya Nagar", the western part continues to be known as "West Mambalam" today.

== History ==
Prior to its inclusion in the then city of Madras, Mambalam was a village in the Saidapet taluk of Chingleput district. The oldest surviving reference to Mambalam is believed to be in a 1726 stone plaque commemorating the construction of the Marmalong Bridge (now known as Maraimalai Adigal Bridge) across the Adyar river by the merchant Coja Petrus Uscan. The bridge is believed to have been named after the village of Marmalong or Marmalan identified with Mambalam. The village was, then, a zamindari administered by zamindars belonging to a Telugu-speaking Reddi family.

Urbanisation of Mambalam was started in 1911 with the construction of the Mambalam railway station on the Madras-Kanchipuram railroad. The Long Tank, which formed the western frontier of Madras city, was drained out in 1923. The same year, the administration of Mambalam was handed over to the British by its zamindar. The township of Theagaraya Nagar, popularly known as T. Nagar, was constructed in the southern part of the zamindari during 1923–25. The townships of Mambalam and Theagaraya Nagar covering an area of 1.008 sq. miles were included in the Mambalam division of Madras city. These outlying residential suburbs were connected to the rest of the city by an effective bus service. The areas surrounding Arya Gowda Road (originally the Ari Gowder Road) were obtained from Badaga leader and politician H. B. Ari Gowder. In its early days, Mambalam was affected by sanitation issues and was notorious for its filaria epidemics. This area was annexed to Chennai in 1946.

Starting from the 1960s, Mambalam grew into a middle-class residential neighbourhood in counterbalance to the sister-township of Theagaraya Nagar which was evolving into a busy shopping district.

== Corporation ward office ==
Mambalam has 3 corporation wards under the old zone of 8 and new zone 10. Ward no 123/133 and 125/135 comes under T.Nagar Constituency and Ward no 133/140 comes under Saidapet Constituency of South Chennai

- 123/133 - Ram Colony
- 125/135 - Thambiah Reddy Road
- 133/140 - Reddy Kuppam road

== Revenue Taluk and Police Station ==
Revenue Taluk Mambalam comes under the Taluk of Mambalam which is situated in K.K. Nagar.

Police Station Mambalam comes under the jurisdiction of R3 Ashok Nagar police station which serves people in and around Ayodhya Mandapam. Whereas R6 Kumaran Nagar police station serves people of Mambalam near Jafferkhanpet and Saidapet West.

Nearest Fire Service and Rescue Station is in Ashok Nagar.

== Transport ==
West Mambalam is served by Mambalam railway station (the busiest station after Chennai Central, Egmore and Tambaram), providing access to Chennai Central, Chennai Egmore and Tambaram. The nearest bus terminus is T. Nagar. The bus service connects the area to K.K.Nagar, Vadapalani, Iyyppanthangal, Poonamallee, T. Nagar and Broadway (via Postal Colony), Mylapore and Vallalar Nagar (via Rangarajapuram) and Saligramam (via Brindavan Street), West Saidapet and Besant Nagar (via Mettupalayam). Other less frequent services connect the area to Taramani, Guindy Industrial Estate, Pattabiram, Tollgate and Kundrathur. Addition to that Small bus operated between Ashok Pillar to Liberty via 4th and 7th avenue of Ashok Nagar, Ayodhya Mandapam, Rangarajapuram. Nearest Metro Rail Station is Ashok Nagar.

Only 4 buses pass through this area, which connects to Broadway, Iyappanthangal, K.K. Nagar etc.

Mambalam comes under RTO West which is situated K.K. Nagar next to the Mambalam Taluk building. The Licence Registration is TN-09.

== Playgrounds ==
In Bhakthavathchalam street in Mambalam there is a playground popularly referred to as "Thambiah Reddy Ground". It is a relatively small ground and generally only cricket is played there. Mambalam is also home to several parks. One of the parks is situated in Elliamman Koil Street and the park is called 'Kittu Park'. Cartman Street West Mambalam's most famous football ground is known as 'PSN ground'.

== Landmarks ==
Temples: There are many historical temples which are more than 100 years old.

Ayodhya Mandapam, which is said to be the place of vocalists, offers place for many cultural events. Other temples include Sathya Narayana Kovil, Kasi Viswanathar Koil, Kodhandaramar temple, Pushpa Vinayagar Kovil, Adhi Kesava Perumal Temple near Govindan Road, Muragashramam, Shree Muthu Mari Amman Temple (Ganapathy Street), Shree Jaya Muthu Mari Amman Temple(Brindavanam Street), Shree Periyapalayathu Amman Temple (Near Dhuraisamy Subway), Mahaganapathy temple (Arya Gowder road), Kali Bari temple (Kali Bari is a miniature replica of the famous Dakshineswar Kali Temple near Kolkata). There is also a Shirdi Sai Baba temple (Jai Shankar Street), and an Annai meditation center.

Mosques: Mosque is located in Chakrapani Street extension.

Church: ECI Church is located in Govindan road at Mettupalayam Bus Stop "Church" Advent Church is located in Pal more street West Mambalam Subway Bus Stop.

Schools: SBSM Jain School, Ahobila Mutt Oriental School, JGHV School, Sitaram Vidhyalaya, Anjugam, Little Oxford, Sri Narayana Mission School, SRM Nightingale, GRT Mahalakshmi School, Hindu Vidhyalaya, Oxford Matriculation Higher Secondary School.

Theaters: There is an old theater called Srinivasa Theater. Another theater, National Theater, earlier situated in Lake View Road, got demolished in the late 90's.

Sanskrit Research Centre: Fellowship of Sanskrit Culture, Sanskrit Teachers' Association, Sanskrit Research Centre are all located in the same building in Arangappan Street, near Srinivasa theatre.

== Notable People from Mambalam ==
- Ravichandran Ashwin: Indian Cricketer
- T.N.Seshagopalan : Carnatic Musician
- Komal Swaminathan: Tamil Playwright & Writer
- Ananthu: Screenwriter, Film director
- Dr.R.Thiagarajan ( Samskrita Ratna,Sanskrit Professor) Author and Orator in English,Tamil and Sanskrit, President Fellowship of Sanskrit Culture, Yajnavalkya Sabha
