= Masinagudi =

Village outside a wildlife sanctuary in Tamil Nadu, India

- Buffer zone of Mudumalai Tiger Reserve
- Nilgiris District
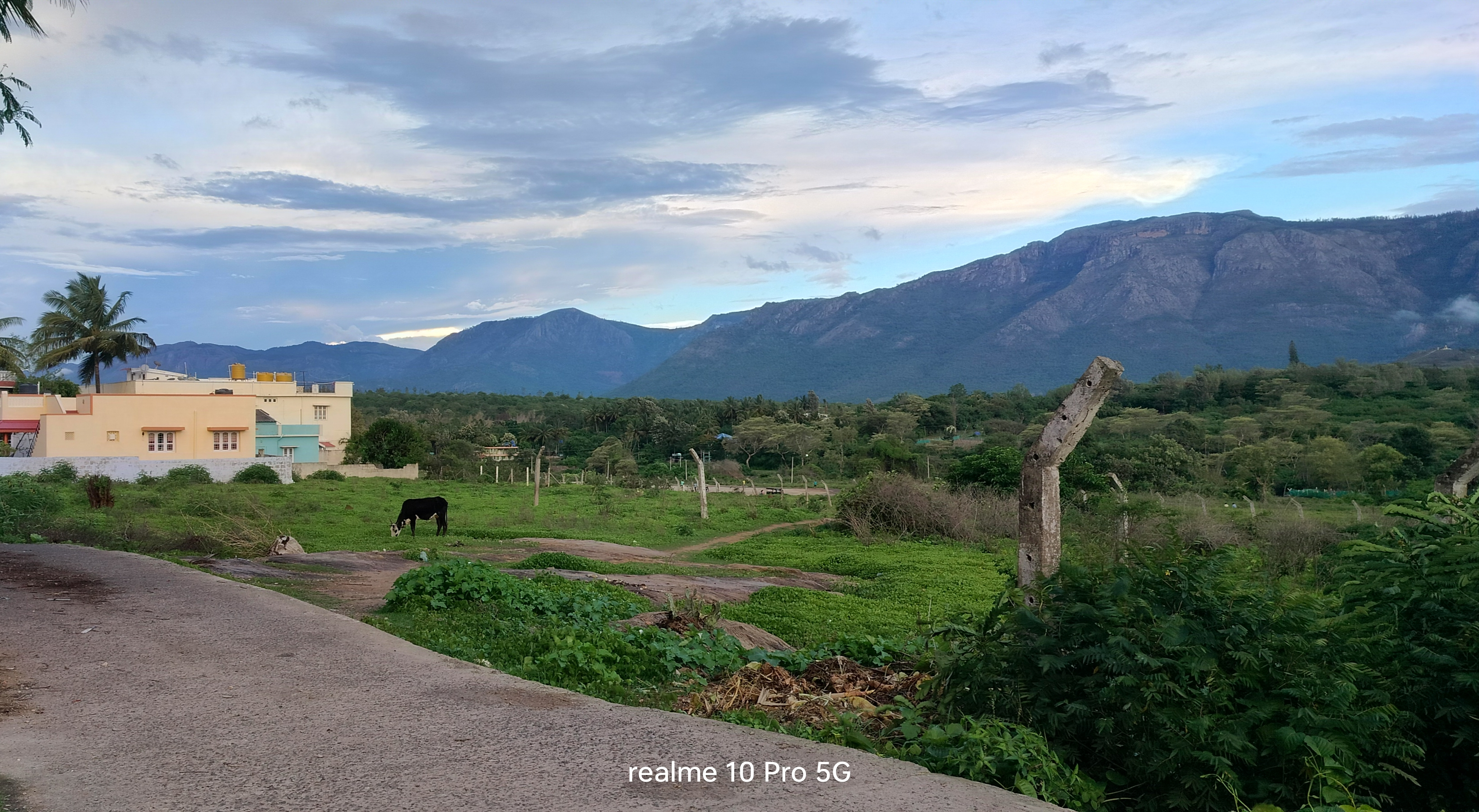
- Lakshmi Nagar in Masinagudi

- Location within Tamil Nadu
- Coordinates: 11.5722°N 76.6427°E
- Country: India
- State: Tamil Nadu
- District: Niligiris District

Government
  - Type: Gram Panchayat
- Elevation: 950 m (3,120 ft)

Population (2011)
  - Total: 8,783
- Demonym: Masinagudian

Languages
  - Official: Tamil
- Time zone: UTC+5:30 (IST)
- PIN: 643223
- Vehicle registration: TN-43
- Climate: Subtropical Highland (Köppen)
- Precipitation: 1,514 mm (60 in)
- Avg. annual temperature: 22.0 °C (72 °F)

Masinagudi is a village in the Nilgiris District of the state of Tamil Nadu in India. It is located 30 km (19 mi) from the district headquarters at Ooty. It is in the buffer zone of the Mudumalai National Park. Masinagudi has several schools and other amenities and a number of resorts.

== Geography ==
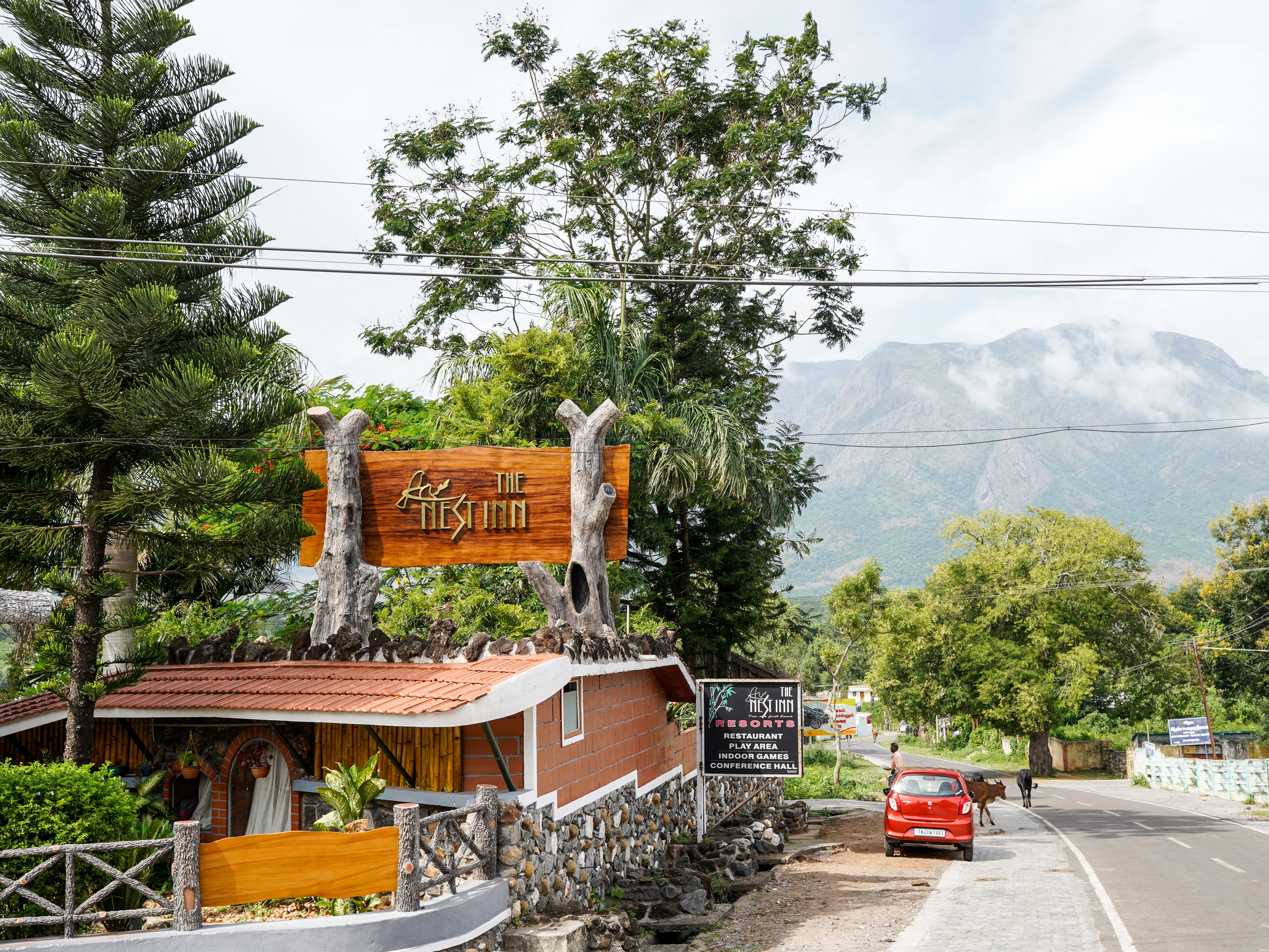
Backdrop of Nilgiris Range

Masinagudi is a village on the Sigur Plateau. It is located on MDR700 between Ooty and Theppakadu in the Nilgiris district of Tamil Nadu, India. It is 30 km (19 mi) from Ooty. The village is in the buffer zone of the Mudumalai Tiger Reserve, just outside the Mudumalai National Park. The total area of Masinagudi is 134.09 km^{2} (51.77 sq mi), of which 114.15 km^{2} (44.07 sq mi) or 85% is forested.

=== Climate ===
Situated at an elevation of 950 m (3,120 ft), Masinagudi is the land of people belonging to the Irula tribe and the appellation is derived from Manasi Amman, which is a manifestation of Maa Sakti. Masinagudi has a tropical climate. When compared with winter, the summers have much more rainfall. This location is classified as Aw by Köppen and Geiger. In Masinagudi, the average annual temperature is 22 °C. In a year, the rainfall is 1514 mm.

== Demographics ==
The population as of the 2011 Census was 8,783 with 2,393 households. The gender ratio was 1,021 females per 1,000 males. The percentages of Scheduled Castes is 25.9% and of Scheduled Tribes is 20.5%. The literacy rate is 67.9%, with males at 74.1% and females 61.9%.

== Amenities ==
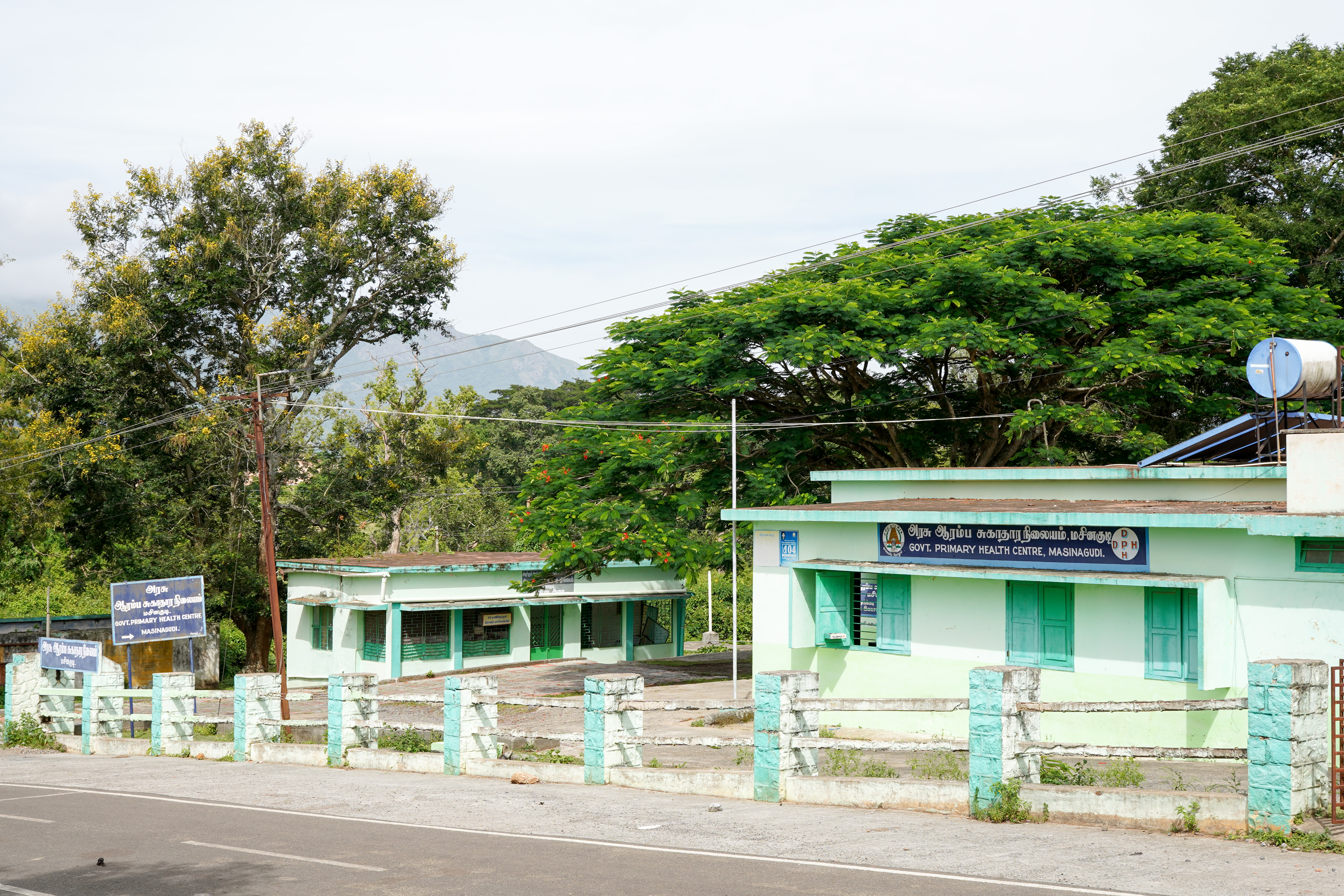
Primary health centre

Masinagudi is governed by a Gram Panchayat. It has a number of schools. As of 2011, there were 8 pre-primary schools, 5 primary schools, 3 middle and secondary schools, and 1 senior secondary school. There was a primary health centre (PHC), dispensary and veterinary hospital. Masinagudi and 10 surrounding sub-villages are served by the India Posts Sub Post Office, Masinagudi with PIN code 643223.

== See also ==
Mudumalai National Park

== Gallery ==
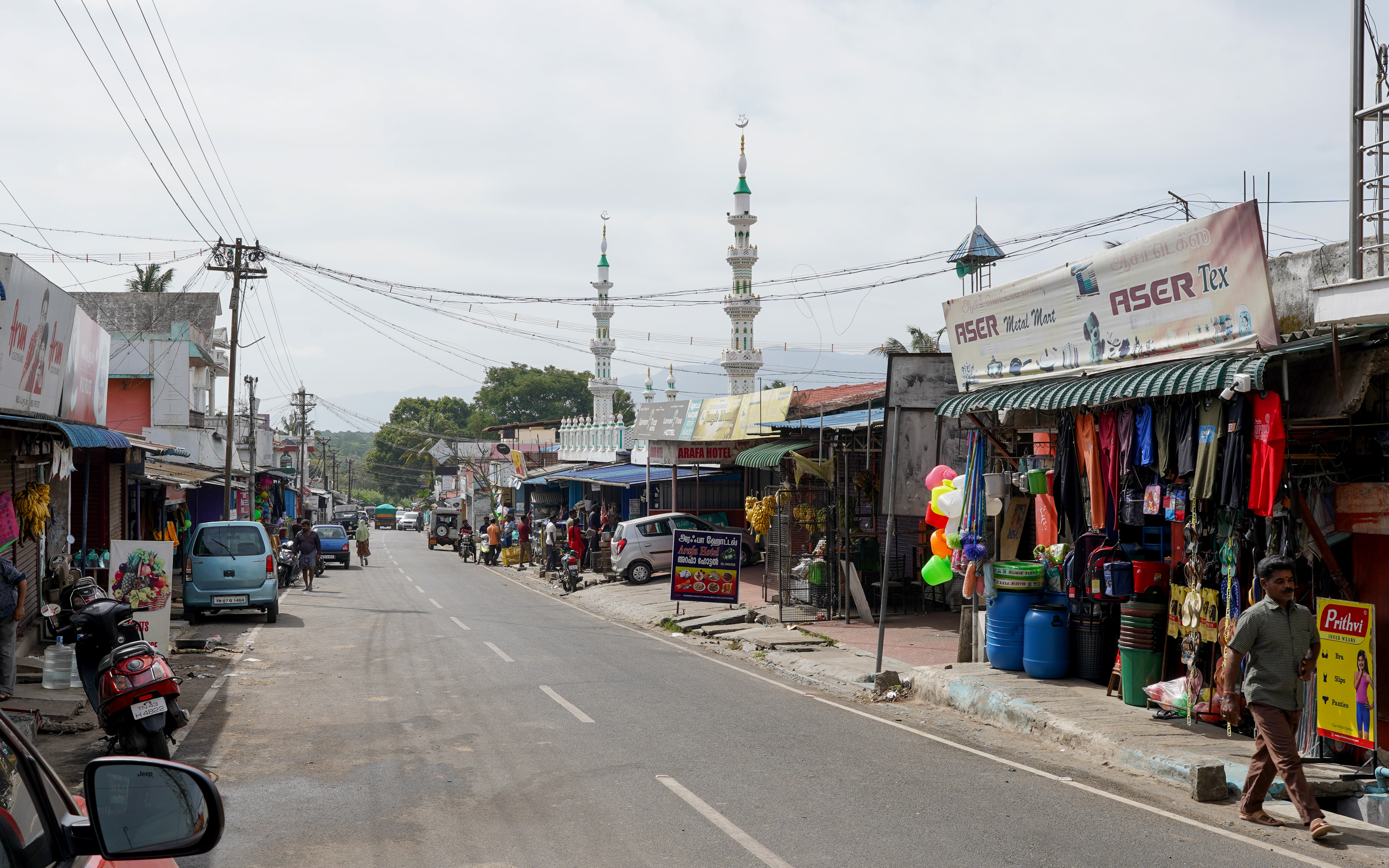
Mysore - Ooty Road
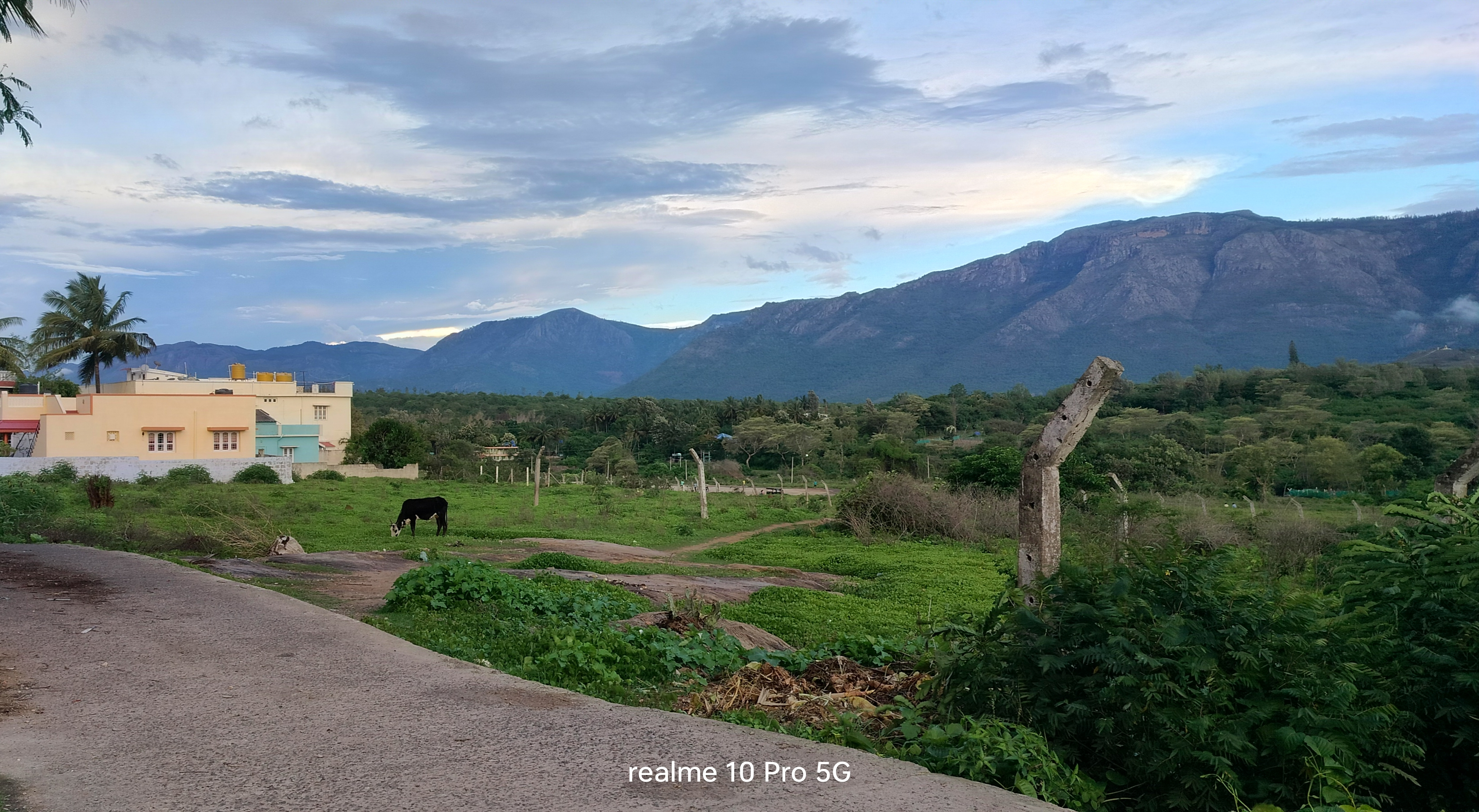
Lakshmi Nagar - Masinagudi

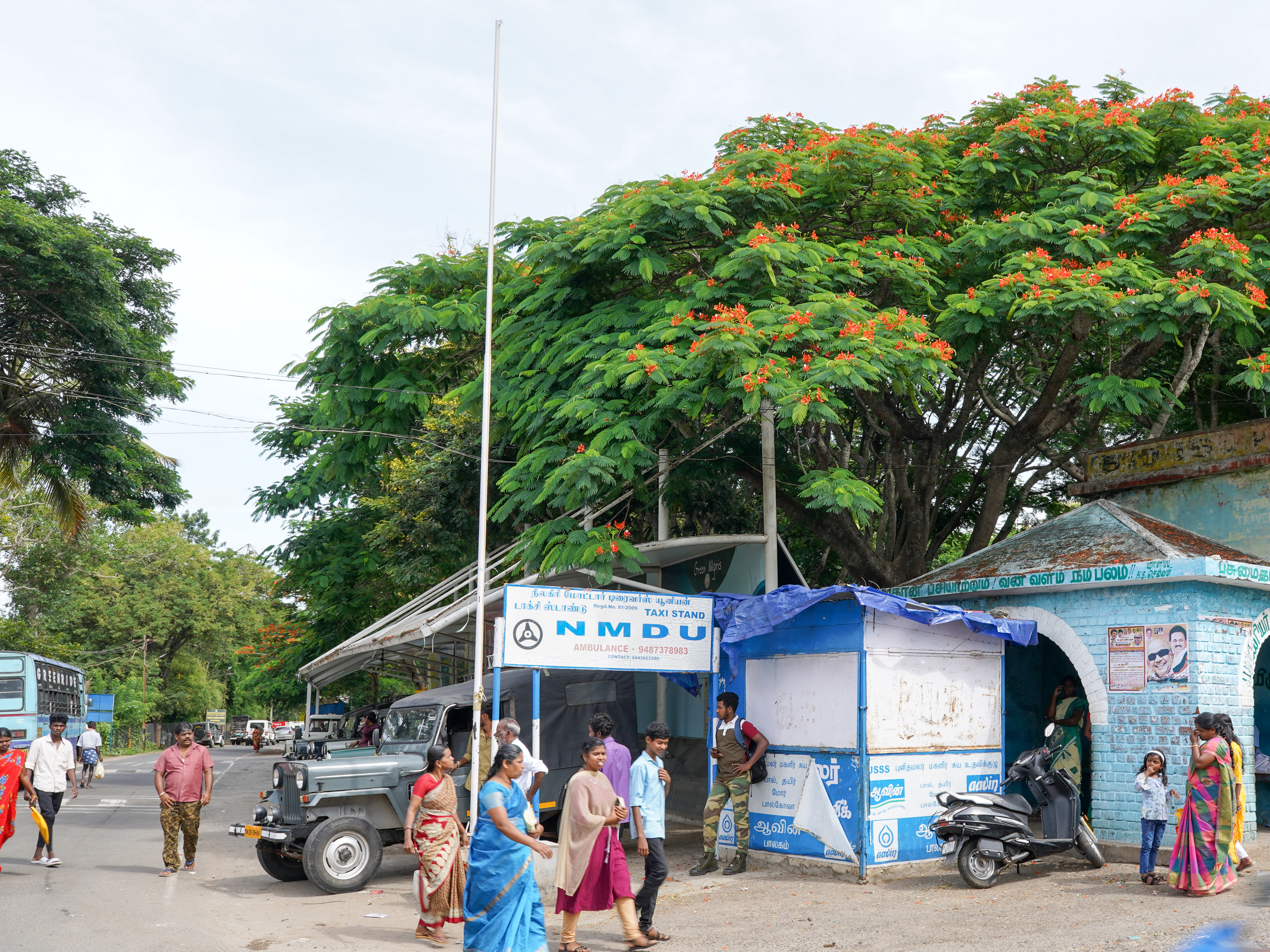
Taxi stand at the crossroads

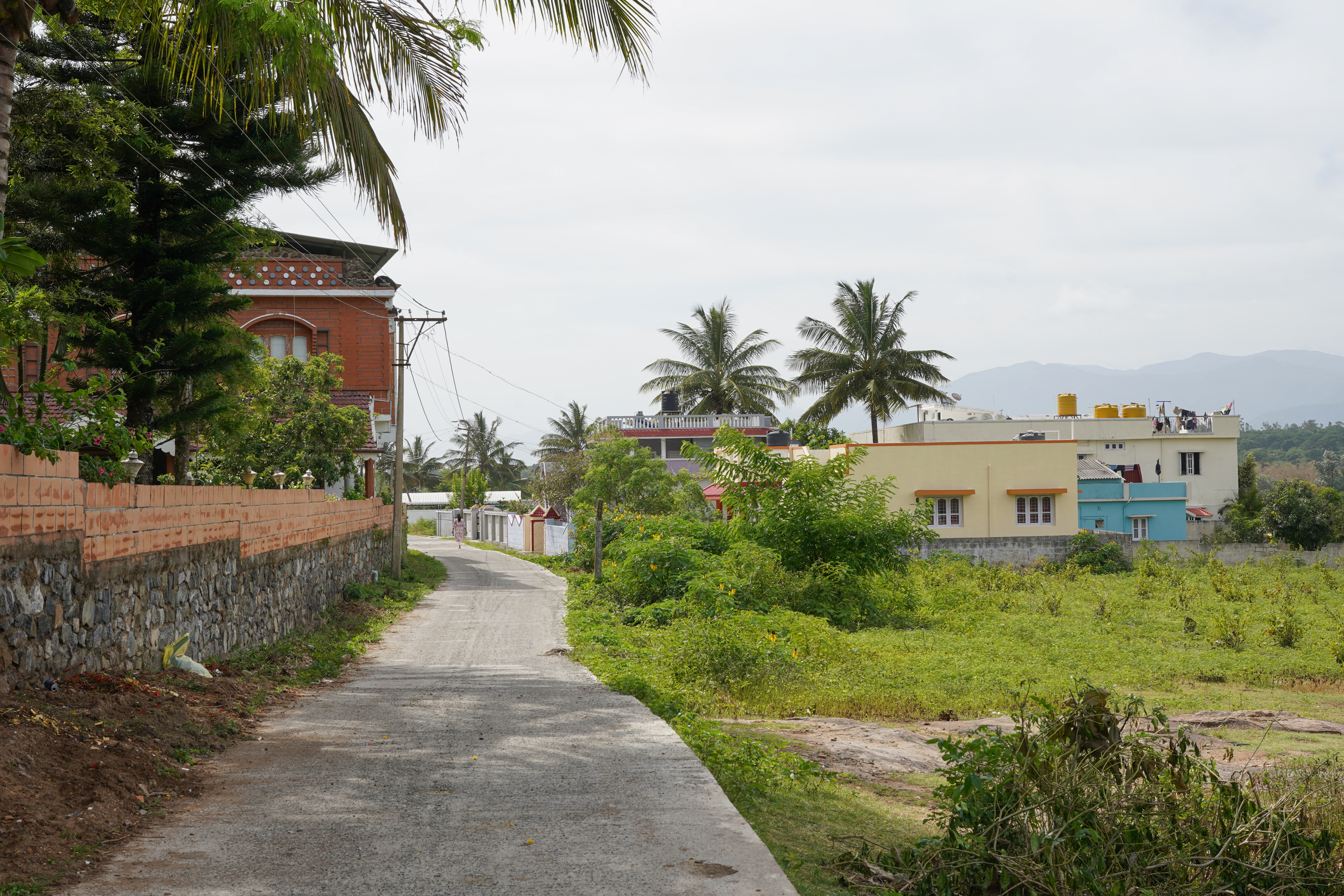
Side road towards the Nilgiris

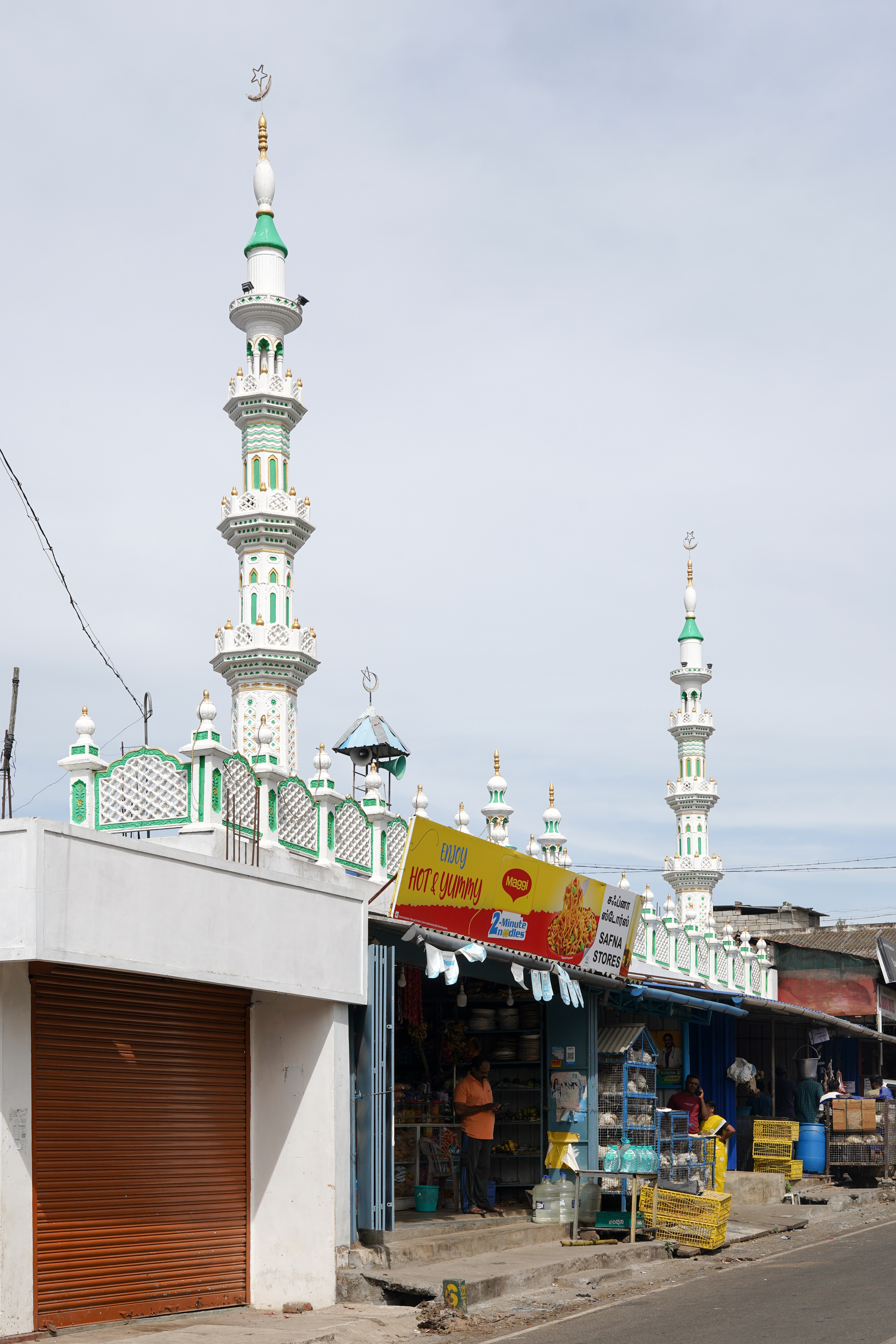
Mosque on MDR700

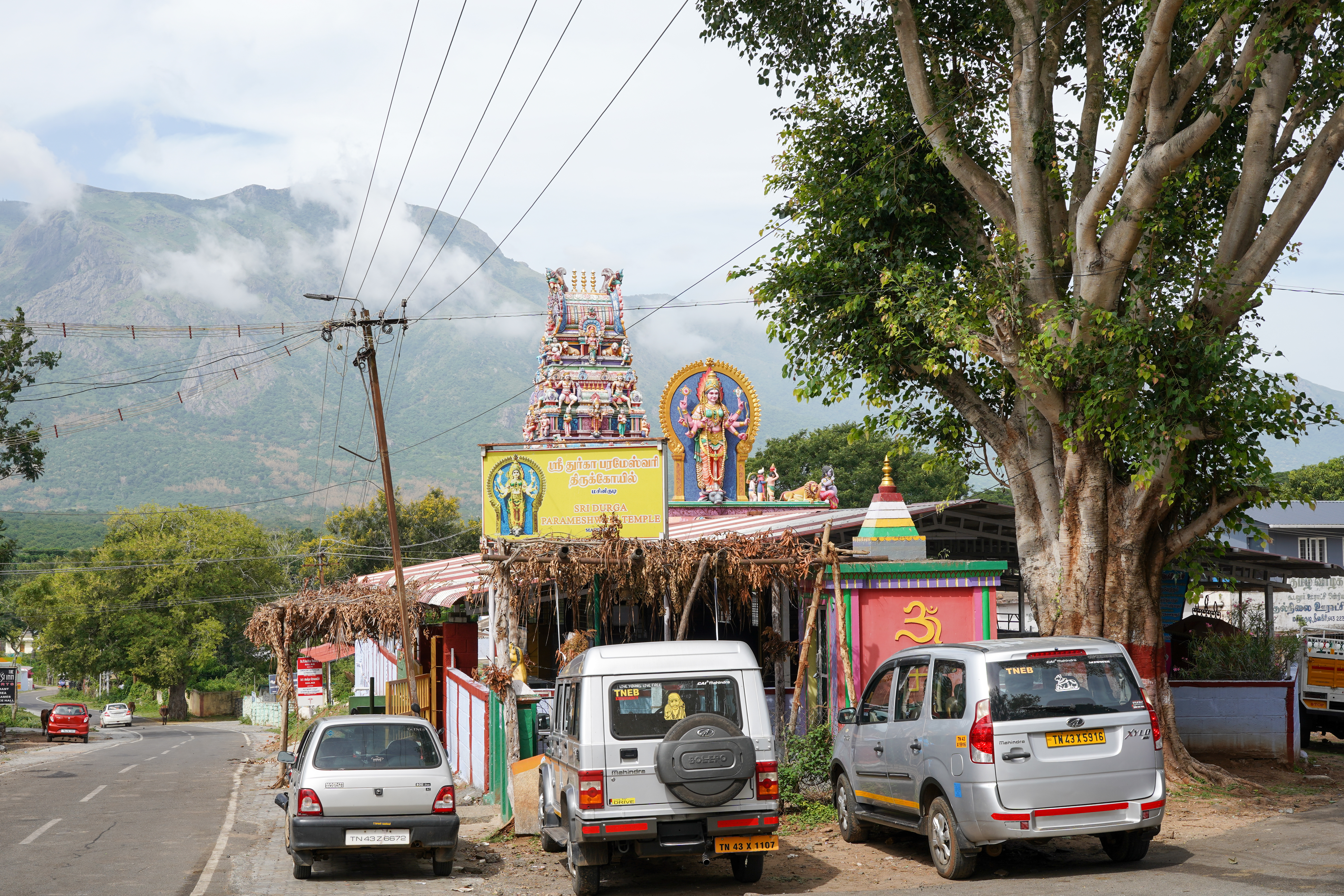
Sri Durga Parameshwari Temple
