= Garapaty Satyanarayana =

Indian politician and independence freedom fighter

Garapaty Satyanarayana గారపాటి సత్యనారాయణ
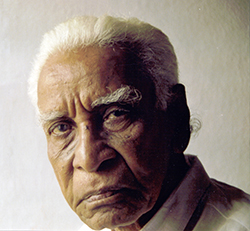

Member of Andhra Pradesh Legislative Assembly
- In office 1951–1953
- Preceded by: None (First MLA)
- Succeeded by: Seerla Brahmayya
- Constituency: Eluru, Andhra Pradesh, India

Personal details
- Born: 6 September 1911 Pedapadu, West Godavari District, British India
- Died: 13 December 2002 (aged 91) Hyderabad, India
- Party: CPI

Garapaty Satyanarayana (Telugu : గారపాటి సత్యనారాయణ ), was a veteran freedom fighter and legislator. He was the first elected Member of the Legislative Assembly from the Eluru constituency, Andhra Pradesh, India.

== Political life ==
Enraged by freedom struggle against the British Rule Satyanarayana plunged into active politics in his late teens. He was arrested for the first time in 1930 when he was 19 years old and was sent to minors' block of the Vellore jail. Since then he remained as a stumbling block to the British Government. He had to remain underground to avoid arrest for quite a long time. His underground activities involved circulation of journals like "Veerabharathi", "Dhanka", participation in banned political conferences etc. Police arrested him on several occasions, sometimes, even at the point of gun under the Civil disobedience act, Anti-War Prevention and Detention Act under the Defence of India rules etc. He spent more than ten years in different prisons during the freedom struggle. Some of the jail terms he served are outlined below.

He was also arrested and lathi charged for his participation in the Quit India Movement and the Telangana Agitation. The aggressive Garapaty played an active role even during his imprisonment times by participating in hunger strikes and agitations.

Even though he was with the Indian National Congress Party, he was later influenced by the Communist ideology and actively promoted and strengthened the party throughout the West Godavari District. Also, it was as a Communist party candidate, that he was the first elected Member of the Legislative Assembly from the Eluru constituency and served the post during the years 1951-1953.

He was a prominent freedom fighters of the West Godavari district, a great orator and attracted large crowds.

== Various terms in Jail during the Freedom Struggle ==
- Four months of Rigorous Imprisonment from 2 August 1930 in the Nellore and Vellore Jails for taking part in the Salt Satyagraha Movement.
- Sentenced on 27 June 1932 to one year's Rigorous Imprisonment and a fine of Rs.400 collected for his participation in the Civil Disobedience Movement. He was confined in the Rajahmundry, Tiruchirapalli, Madura and Vellore Jails. He was released on 1 April 1933.
- Arrested on 6 April 1940 and interned at Pedapadu till 15 July 1940.
- Was detained in the Vellore and Cuddalore Jails from 17 July 1940 to 26 January 1942 when he was released on Medical grounds
- Was again arrested on 24 September 1942 and detained in the Vellore, Palayamkota and Thanjore Jails up to 30 December 1943.

== Associations with other leaders of the Indian Freedom Struggle ==
Garapaty Satyanarayana meeting up with his ex-Jailmate / friend Dr. R. Venkatraman during the latter's tenure (25 July 1987 – 25 July 1992) as the President of India

.

During his various jail terms, he developed a close association with several leaders of national level such as Mohan Lal, Pratul Chandra Ganguli, Jeevanlal Chaterjee, Shri Bhattukeshwar Dutt, a close associate of the legendary Sardar Bhagat Singh, Shri Kanneganti Hanumanthu, a close associate of the revolutionary legend Shri Alluri Sitarama Raju. He also shared jail terms with leaders such as Dr. Neelam Sanjeeva Reddy, and Dr. R. Venkatraman who went on to become the Presidents of Independent India, during the terms (25 July 1977 – 25 July 1982) and (25 July 1987 – 25 July 1992) respectively.

He was also instrumental in bringing Mahatma Gandhiji during 1937 and Netaji Subhash Chandra Bose in 1940 to Eluru town and responsible for holding massive rallies in support of them.

He also communicated with Pandit Jawaharlal Nehru in the capacity of the Secretary of the District Congress Committee and was also responded to through letters.

He belongs to the peer group of state level leaders like Sardar Dandu Narayana Raju, Kalipatnam Kondaiah and Alluri Satyanarayana Raju. Intimacy with staunch communist leaders and the study of Marx literature during his imprisonment made him left lenient.

== Various Organisations and Posts held ==
He was not only a political leader but also helped set up various Workers Unions and Organizations for the welfare of the workers and served as a trade union leader in several of them. Some of the organisations he helped found are as follows:

- Formed the Youth league during the years 1935–1936.
- Formed the Eluru Town Press Workers Union in the year 1935.
- Formed and Organized the Eluru Town Tannery Workers Union in 1937.
- Also formed the Jute Workers Union in Eluru in the year 1935 and served as its president till 1982.
- Served as the Secretary of the District Congress Committee during the years 1936–1937.
- Secretary of the District Congress Socialist Party during the years 1937–1939.
- Member of the District Executive Committee of the Communist Party of India in 1942.
- Member of the District Executive Committee of the Communist Party of India (Marxist) from 1963–1968.
