= List of Hindu temples in Kanchipuram =

Kanchipuram ([kaːɲdʑipuɾam]), or Kānchi or Kāncheepuram, is a famous temple city in the Indian state of Tamil Nadu. It served as the capital city of the Pallava Kingdom. It is also known by its former names Kanchiampathi, Conjeevaram, and the nickname "The City of Thousand Temples" It is now the Administrative headquarters of Kanchipuram district. Kanchipuram is located 72 kilometers from Chennai, the capital city of the southern state of Tamil Nadu, India.

Kanchipuram is considered one of the seven holiest cities to the Hindus of India. In Hinduism, a kshetra is a sacred ground, a field of active power, a place where moksha, final release can be obtained. The Garuda Purana enumerates seven cities as providers of moksha, namely Ayodhya, Mathura, Haridwar, Varanasi, Avantikā, Dvārakā, and Kanchipuram.

== List of temples ==
Among the major Hindu temples in Kanchipuram are some of the most prominent Vishnu Temples and Shiva Temples of Tamil Nadu like the Varadharaja Perumal Temple for Vishnu and the Ekambaranatha Temple which is the "earth abode" of Shiva. Kamakshi Amman Temple, Kumara Kottam, Kachapeshwarar Temple, and the Kailasanathar Temple are some of the other prominent temples.

* Divya Desams - temples dedicated to Vishnu glorified in the Nalayira Divya Prabandham, the early medieval Tamil literature canon of the Alvar saints from the 6th–9th centuries CE. There are 15 Divya Desams in Kanchipuram.
* Padal petra stalam - where the three of the most revered Nayanars (Shaiva Saints), Appar, Sundarar, and Sambandar have glorified the Shiva temples in Tevaram during the 7th-8th centuries. There are 11 padal petra stalams in Kanchipuram.

Name of the temple	Photo	Architecture/Timeline	Notes/Beliefs
Shiva Temples
Ekambareswarar Temple (Kachi Ekambam)		600 CE, Pallavas, Present structure - Nayaks of Tanjore	The temple is the largest temple in the town of Kanchipuram and is located in the northern part of the town. The temple gopuram (gateway tower) is 59m tall, which is one of the tallest gopurams in India. It is one of the Pancha Bhoota Stalams representing earth (Sanskrit: पन्च भूत स्थल) referring to the five temples, dedicated to Shiva, a Hindu god, each representing the manifestation of the five prime elements of nature- land, water, air, sky, and fire.
Kailasanathar Temple		567 CE foundation, Expansion in 7th century by Rajasimha Pallava	The temple is the oldest Pallava temple still in existence and is declared an archeological monument by Archaeological Survey of India. The temple is architecturally unusual in having a series of cells with sculptures within.
Karchapeswarar Temple		Pallava dynasty, present structure by Vijayanagar rulers	Vishnu is believed to have worshipped Shiva in the form of kurma (tortoise). The other name given to the temple is Kachipedu in some inscriptions. The temple is adjacent to the Kanthakottam temple.
Sathyanatheswarar Temple ( Kachi Nerikkaaraikkadu)			Tirugnana Sambandar, a 7th-century Tamil Shaiva poet, venerated Sathyanatheswarar in one verse in Tevaram, compiled as the First Tirumurai. As the temple is revered in Tevaram.
Metraleeswar Temple (Kachi Metrali)			Appar and Sambandar, the 7th-century Tamil Shaiva poet, venerated Metralinathar in one verse each in Tevaram, compiled as the First Tirumurai.
Ona Kantheeswarar Temple (Onakanthan Thali)			Onakandan means the lover of the Sravana constellation and Metrali refers to southern side.
Anekadhangavadeswarar Temple (Kachi Anekatangapadam)			The temple is believed to be in forest frequented by large set of people. The temple is close to the Kailasantha temple in a very small campus.
Malligeswarar Temple (Chengalpattu)		Constructed on 21st century which is spreading more positive energy to this district.	This temple is located near Mahindra world city, Chengalpattu.
Kuranganilmuttam		Pallavas	The temple is close to Mamandur, south of Kanchipuram. The temple has a rock cut shrine of Pallava origin associated with monkey, squirrel and crow (kurangu, anil, and mutram in Tamil). The temple has been revered by Sambandar's Tevaram.
Muktheeswarar Temple		Nandivarman II	The temple is in dilapidated state and has inscriptions dating back to the Pallava period. The sculpture in front mandapa (hall) has bold outlines.
Vazhakarutheeswarar Temple			Valakku indicates case - worship in this temple is believed to relieve people of all their litigations.
Iravatanesvara Temple, Kanchipuram		Pallavas, 8th century CE	It is famous for its splendid vimana and the circular sanctum. This temple was built by Pallava King Narasimhavarman II (Rajasimhan). The temple is maintained by Archaeological Survey of India and is a protected monument.
Shakti Temples
Kamakshi Amman Temple		Pallavas in 6th century and modified in 14th-17th century	The goddess is depicted in the form of a yantra, placed in front of the deity. Adi Shankara is closely associated with this temple and is believed to have established the Kanchi matha after this temple. The mutt's official history states that it was founded by Adi Shankara of Kaladi, and that His Holiness Jayendra Saraswati Swami is the current pontiff - The 69th head in succession, tracing its history back to the 5th century BCE. A related claim is that Adi Shankara came to Kanchipuram, and that he established the Kanchi mutt named "Dakshina Moolamnaya Sarvagnya Sri Kanchi Kamakoti Peetam" in a position of supremacy (Sarvagnya Peetha) over the other mathas of the subcontinent, before his death there.
Other Hindu Temples
Kumarakottam			The temple is dedicated to Muruga (called Skanda), the son of Shiva and Parvati and is located between the Ekambareswarar temple and Kamakshi Amman temple leading to the cult of Somaskanda (Skanda, the child between Shiva and Parvati). The temple is the birthplace of Kandapuranam, the Tamil religious work on Muruga translated from Sanskrit Skanda Purana in 1625 CE by Kachiappa Shivacharya.
Chitragupta temple		Cholas - 9th century CE	Chitragupta, as per Hinduism is the younger brother of Yama, the death god, who keeps track of good and bad deeds of humanbeings to decide their residence in heaven or hell. The temple is just one of its kind that has a separate temple for Chitragupta. The panchaloha (alloy made of five elements) idol of the deity and his consort was found during an excavation process during 1911 CE.
Jain Temples
Trilokyanatha Temple - Jain Temple		8th century CE, Pallavas	Trilokyanatha/Chandraprabha temple is a twin jain temple having inscriptions from Pallava king, Narasimhavarman II and the Chola kings Rajendra Chola I, Kulothunga Chola I and Vikrama Chola, and the Kanarese inscriptions of Krishnadevaraya. The temple is maintained by Tamil Nadu archaeological department.
Vishnu Temples
Varadharaja Perumal Temple		1053 CE, Cholas, present structure 14th-15th century, Nayaks of Tanjore	Varadharaja Perumal Temple was originally built by the Cholas in 1053 and it was expanded during the reigns of the great Chola kings Kulottunga Chola I and Vikrama Chola. In the 14th century another wall and a gopura were built by the later Chola kings. It is an ancient temple and one of the 108 Divya Desams, the holy abodes of Vishnu. It is located in a part of Kanchipuram called the Vishnu Kanchi, where various Vishnu temples are situated. Varadharaja Perumal Temple is a huge one on a 23-acre (93,000 m^{2}) complex and shows the architectural skills of ancient vishvakarma sthapathis in temple architecture and is famous for its holiness and ancient history. Another significant thing about the temple is the beautifully carved lizards plated with gold, found over the sanctum.
Ashtabujakaram - Sri Adhikesava Perumal Temple			The deity is with eight hands and hence called asta bhujakaram.
Tiruvekkaa - Sri Yathothkari Temple			The deity here is termed "Sonna vannam seitha Perumal" meaning the truth sayer. It lies west of Varadaraja Perumal temple.
Tiruththanka - Sri Deepa prakasa Perumal Temple			There are shrines for Lakshmi Hayagriva, Andal, Vedanta Desika and the Alvars. It is the birthplace of Vedanta Desika. There is a separate shrine for Hayagriva along with Vedanta Desika.
Tiruvelukkai - Sri Azhagiya Singar Temple			The temple is known for the Narasimha (lion form) avatar of Vishnu.
Tirukalvanoor - Sri Adi Varaha Swami Temple			The temple is a small shrine inside the Kamakshi Amman temple precinct.
Tiruoorakam - Sri Ulagalantha Swami Temple		846-869 CE, Nandivarman III	The temple is believed to have stood in Karikala hall, after ancient Chola king Karikala. Inscriptions indicate the existence of the hall in olden days. All the four temples are enshrined in the same complex.
Tiruneeragam - Sri Jagadeeshwarar Temple		846-869 CE, Nandivarman III	The temple is believed to have stood in Karikala hall, after ancient Chola king Karikala. Inscriptions indicate the existence of the hall in olden days. All the four temples are enshrined in the same complex.
Tirukaaragam - Sri Karunagara Perumal Temple		846-869 CE, Nandivarman III	The temple is believed to have stood in Karikala hall, after ancient Chola king Karikala. Inscriptions indicate the existence of the hall in olden days. All the four temples are enshrined in the same complex.
Tirukaarvaanam - Sri Tirukaarvarnar Temple		846-869 CE, Nandivarman III	The temple is believed to have stood in Karikala hall, after ancient Chola king Karikala. Inscriptions indicate the existence of the hall in olden days. All the four temples are enshrined in the same complex.
Tiruparamechura Vinnagaram - Sri Vaikunda Perumal Temple		Late 8th century, Nandivarman II	The place is the birthplace of the Alvar saint, Poigai Alvar. The central shrine has tiers of 3 shrines, one over the other, with Vishnu depicted in each of them. The prakaram (corridors round the sanctum) has series of sculptures depicting the Pallava rule and conquer.
Tirupavalavannam - Sri Pavala Vanar Temple			The temple faces the west. The twin Ashvins are regarded to have worshipped the deity here.
Tirupaadagam - Sri Pandava Thoodar Temple		Expanded in 1070-1120 CE, Kulothunga Chola I	The temple has a set of inscriptions associated with Cholas. A record of the Chola king, Rajakesari Varaman or Kulothunga Chola I, dated in his fifth year.
Tirunilaaththingalthundam - Sri Nilathingal Thundathan Perumal Temple			The temple is a small shrine close to the sanctum sanctorum of the Ekambranathar temple.
Tirupputkuzhi - Sri Vijaya Raghava Perumal Temple			

== Sources ==
- Ayyar, P. V. Jagadisa (1991), South Indian shrines: illustrated, New Delhi: Asian Educational Services, ISBN 81-206-0151-3.
- K.R., Subramanian; K. R., Subramanian (M.A.) (2002), The origin of Saivism and its history in the Tamil land, New Delhi: Asian Educational Services, ISBN 81-206-0144-0
- Ramaswamy, Vijaya (2007), Historical dictionary of the Tamils, United States: Scarecrow Press, INC., ISBN 978-0-470-82958-5
- Rao, P.V.L. Narasimha (2008), Kanchipuram - Land of Legends, Saints & Temples, New Delhi: Readworthy Publications (P) Ltd., ISBN 978-93-5018-104-1
- Sajnani, Dr. Manohar (2001), Encyclopedia of tourism resources in India, Volume 2, Delhi: Kalpaz Publications, ISBN 81-7835-014-9.
- Soundara Rajan, Kodayanallur Vanamamalai (2001), Concise classified dictionary of Hinduism, New Delhi: Concept Publishing Company, ISBN 81-7022-857-3.
