= Tiruththanka =

Hindu temple in Kanchipuram

Deepaprakasa Perumal Temple
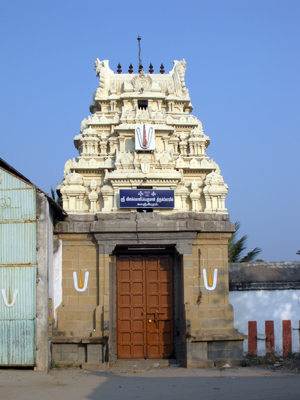
- Gopuram (gate tower) of the temple at Kanchipuram

- Location in Tamil Nadu

Religion
- Affiliation: Hinduism
- District: Kanchipuram
- Deity: Deepapraksar (Vishnu) Maragathavalli (Lakshmi)

Location
- State: Tamil Nadu
- Country: India
- Coordinates: 12°49′28″N 79°42′20″E

Architecture
- Type: Dravidian architecture

The Deepaprakasa Perumal Temple, also referred to as Tiruththanka, Desikar Avatara Sthalam, and Tooppul, in Kanchipuram in the Indian state of Tamil Nadu, is a temple dedicated to Vishnu, a Hindu god. Constructed in the Dravidian style of architecture, the temple is mentioned in the Naalayira Divya Prabandham, the early medieval Tamil canon of the Alvar saints from the 6th–9th centuries CE. It is one of the 108 Divya Desams dedicated to Vishnu, who is worshipped as Deepaprakasar, and his consort Lakshmi as Maragathavalli.

The temple is believed to have been expanded during the Medieval Cholas and Vijayanagara kings. The temple has inscriptions on its walls dating from the period of Rajaraja Chola III (1223 CE). A granite wall surrounds the temple, enclosing all the shrines and two bodies of water. There is a two-tiered rajagopuram, the temple's gateway tower, in the temple.

Deepaprakasar is believed to have appeared to Brahma. The temple is maintained and administered by the Hindu Religious and Endowment Board of the Government of Tamil Nadu.

== Legend ==
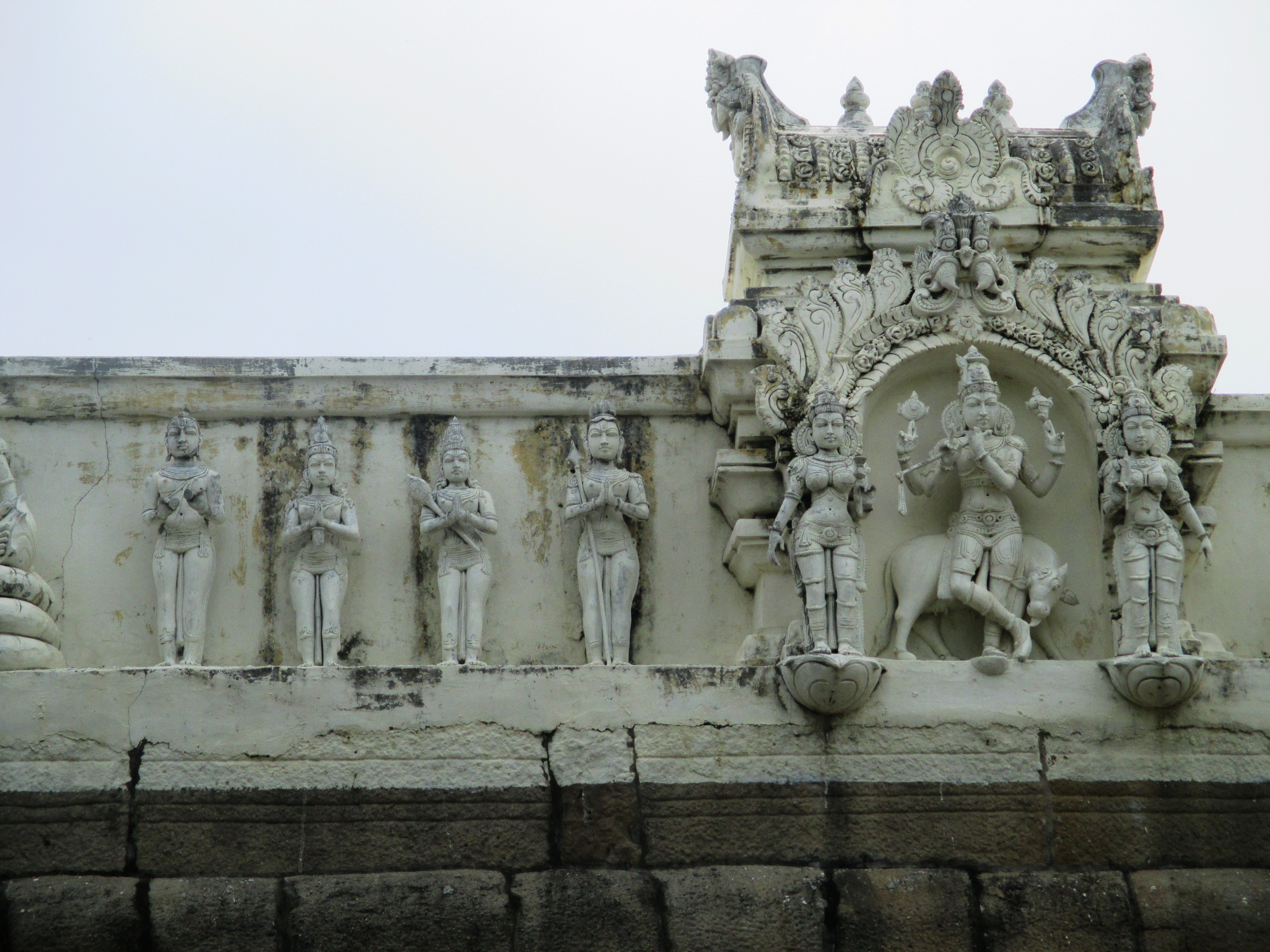
Stucco image of legend

According to Hindu legend, once there was an argument between Saraswati, the consort of Brahma, and Lakshmi on their superiority. They went to Indra, the king of the devas. Indra judged Lakshmi as superior, and not satisfied with his argument, Saraswati went to her husband, Brahma. He also chose Lakshmi to be the superior one. Saraswati was unhappy with the decision, and decided to stay away from Brahma. Brahma did a severe penance praying to Vishnu, and did an Ashvamedha Yagna. Saraswati was still angry that the yagna, which usually is done along with consorts, was done without her by Brahma with Savitri. She tried to disrupt the penance by sending darkness, but Vishnu interfered "like a light from the lamp", hence he is also called as Vilakoli Perumal. Another version of the legend states that Saraswati sent rakshakas to spoil the penance, which was spoiled by the stream of light from Vishnu. Since Vishnu appeared as light to overcome the darkness of the situation, he is termed Deepaprakasa Perumal.

Vedanta Desika (1268 - 1369 CE) was an ardent devotee of Deepa Prakasa Temple at Thoppul. The devotion of Desika is mentioned in Saranagathi Deepika in 59 verses. He was born in this site. Vedanta Desika also has a shrine inside the temple. And a statue of Hayagriva worshipped by him, also has a temple nearby to him.

== Architecture ==
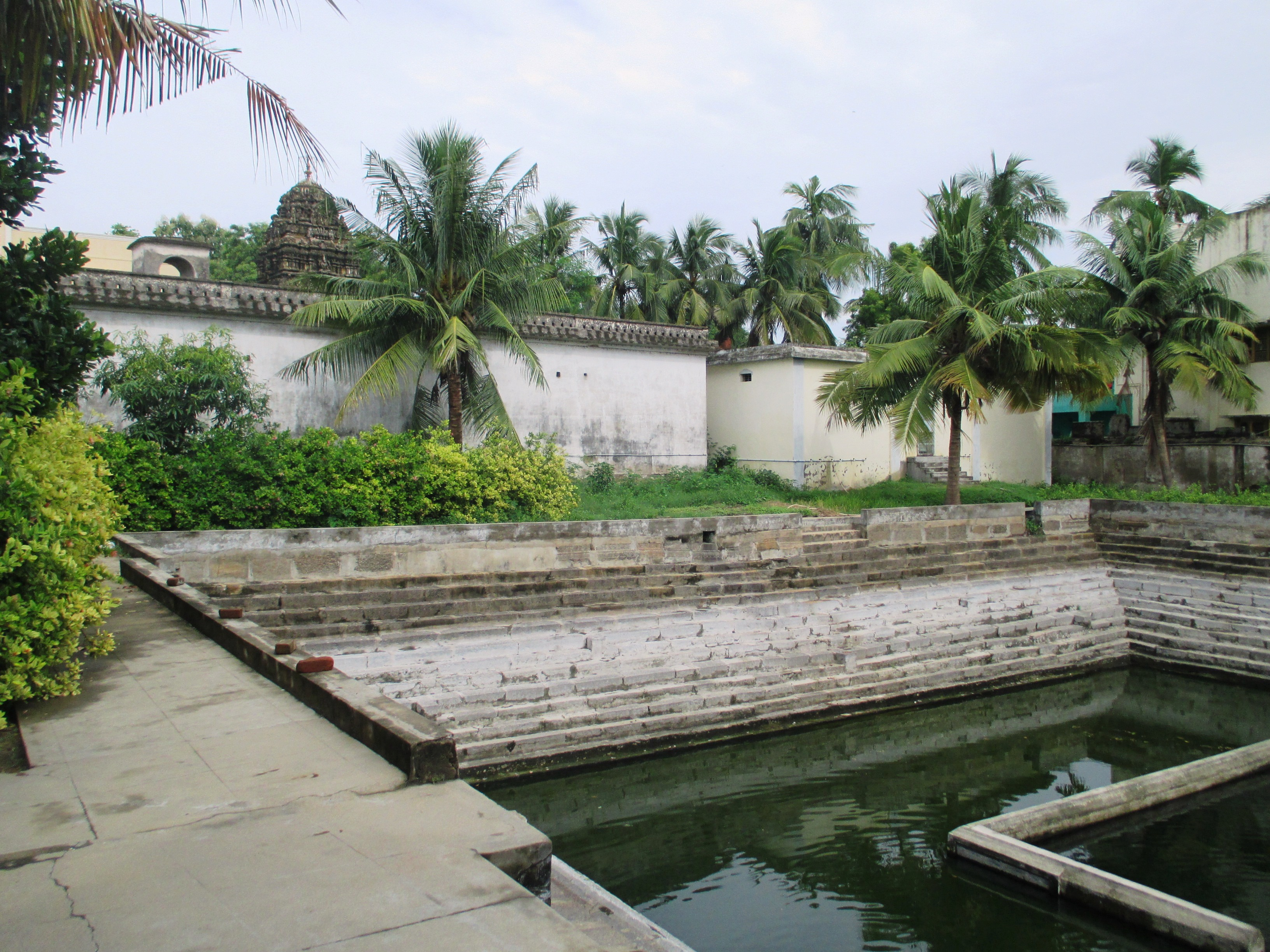
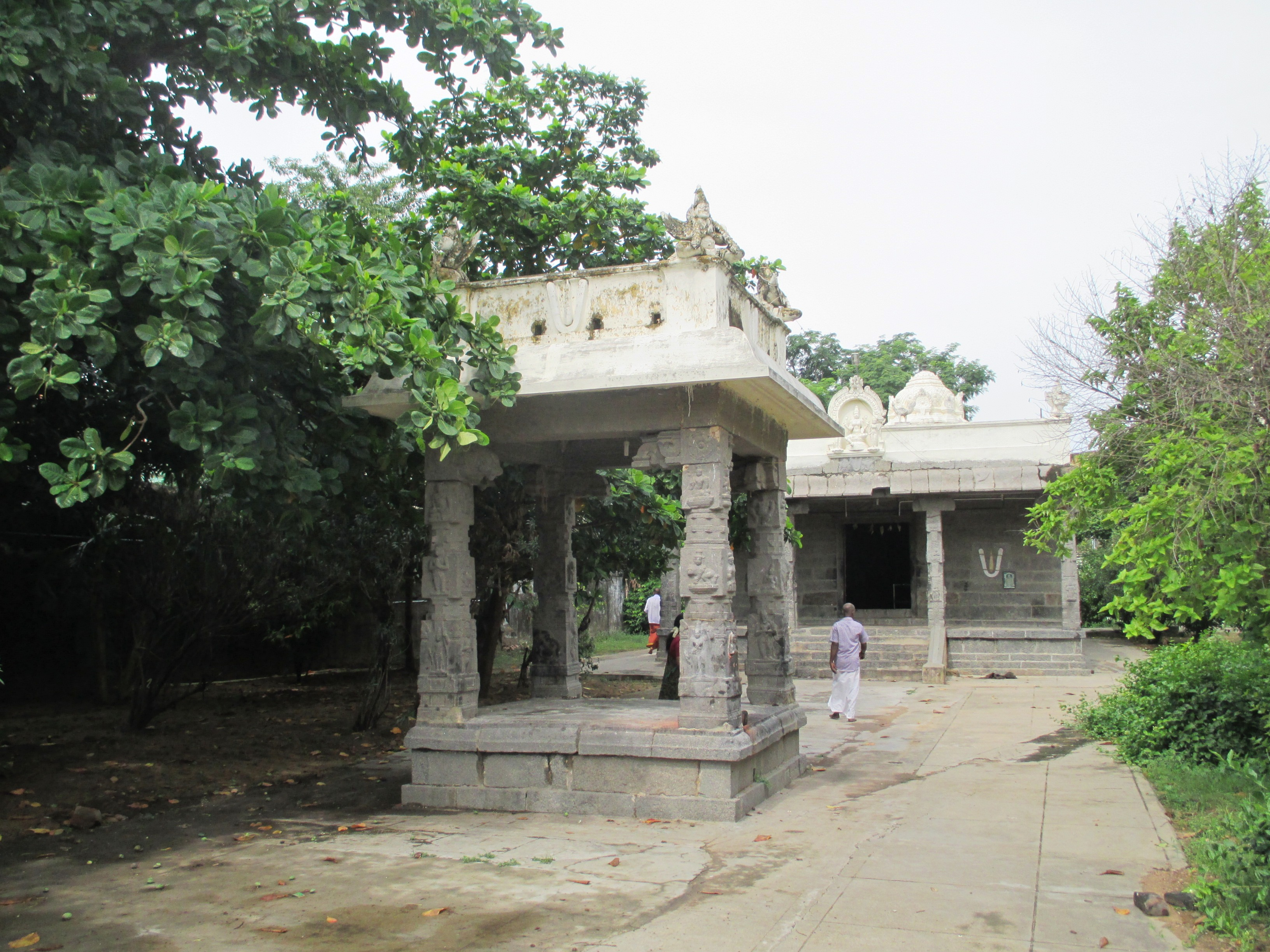
Shrines and temple tank

The temple is located in Vishnu Kanchi along with most other Vishnu temples in Kanchipuram. The temple has a three-tiered rajagopuram, the gateway tower. The temple has a rectangular plan surrounded by brick walls and has two precincts. The central shrine of the temple has the image of the presiding deity, Deepaprakasa Perumal in sitting posture. There are shrines for Lakshmi, Hayagriva, Andal, Vedanta Desika, and Alvars. It is the birthplace of Vedanta Desika. There is a separate shrine for Hayagreeva along with Vedanta Desika. The temple tank, Saraswati Tirtham, is located outside the premises. A shrine is dedicated to Vedanta Desika facing the south is seen in the temple. The icon of Desika is believed to be installed by his son, Nayinar Varadhachariar. The image is seen sporting Abhaya Mudra (palm displayed in attitude of protection). The temple practises Vaikhasana Agama.

== Religious importance ==
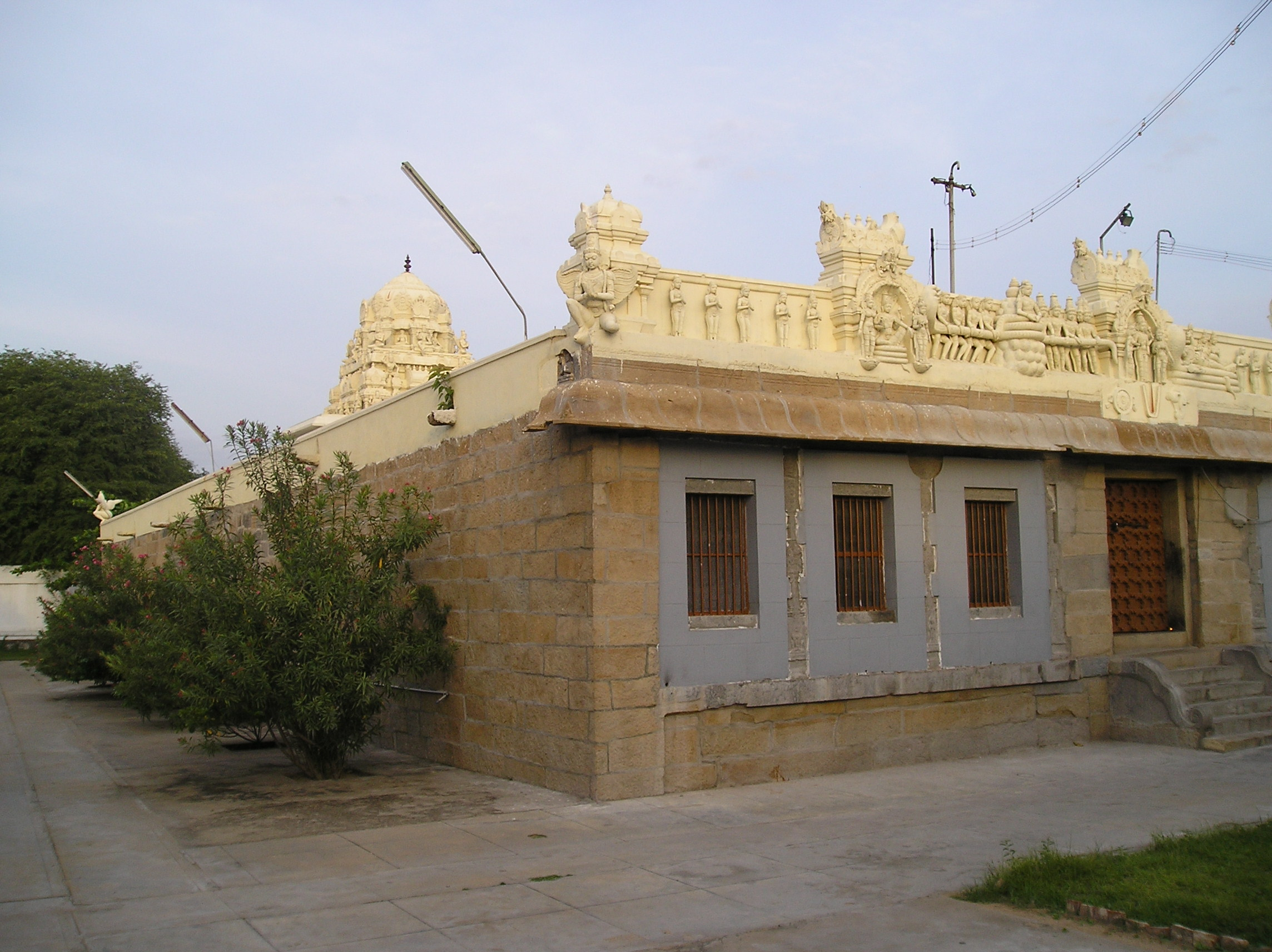
Image of first precinct

The temple is mentioned in Naalayira Divya Prabandham, the 7th–9th century Vaishnava canon, by Thirumangai Alvar in one hymn. The temple is a Divya Desam, one of the 108 Vishnu temples that are mentioned in the book. The temple is one of the 14 Divya Desams in Kanchipuram. The temple is believed to be the place where Brahma performed penance seeking the wishes of Vishnu and one of the few places where Brahma worshiped Vishnu. The temple is counted one among the four temples in Kanchipuram that include Yathothkari Perumal Temple, Ashtabhujagara Perumal temple and Varadaraja Perumal Temple where the legend of Brahma performing penance is associated. The temple is also revered in the verses of Vedanta Desika.

== Festivals and religious practices ==
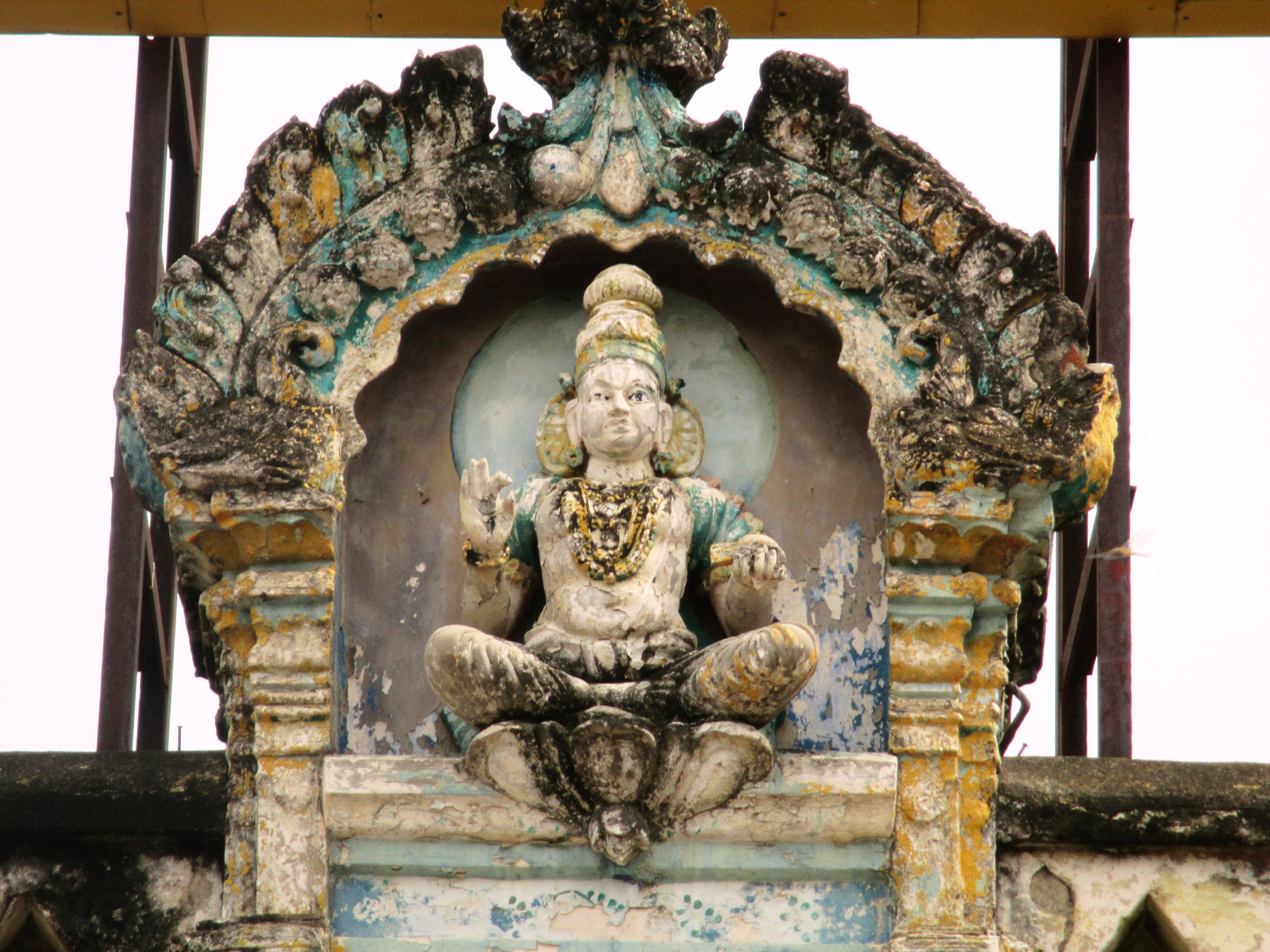
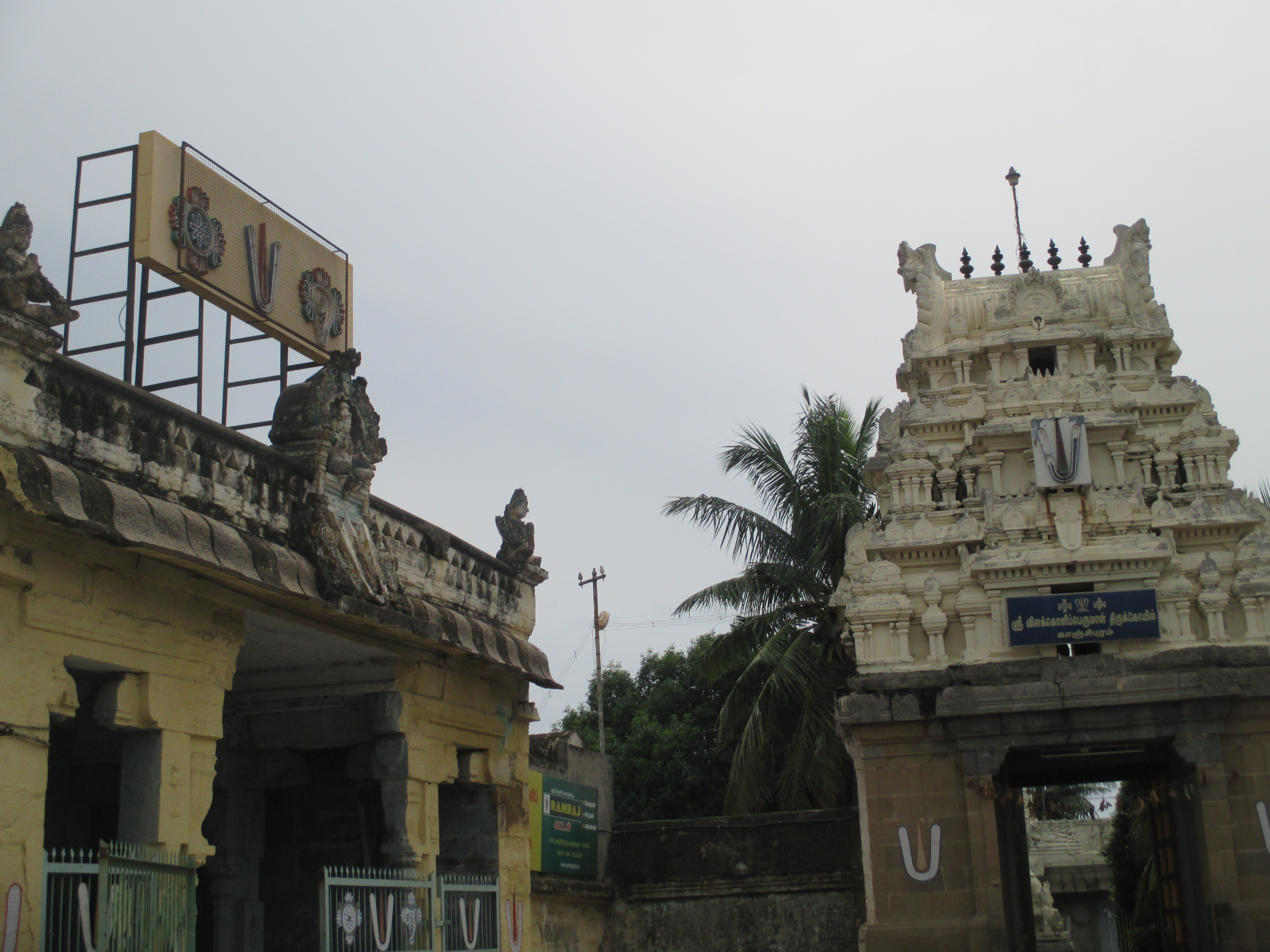
Vedanta Desikar and his shrine located close to entrance tower

The Brahmostavam festival during the Tamil month of Puratasi (September - October) is the major festival celebrated in Vedanta Desika shrine. During the festival, the festival image of Desikar is carried to the Varadaraja Perumal Temple. Special worship practises and rituals are followed during the occasion. During the Brahmostavam in Varadaraja Perumal Temple during the Tamil month of Vaikasi (May - June), the festival image of Varadaraja Perumal is brought to the shrine of Vedanta Desika on three different days.
