= Ashtabujakaram =

Vishnu temple in Kanchipuram

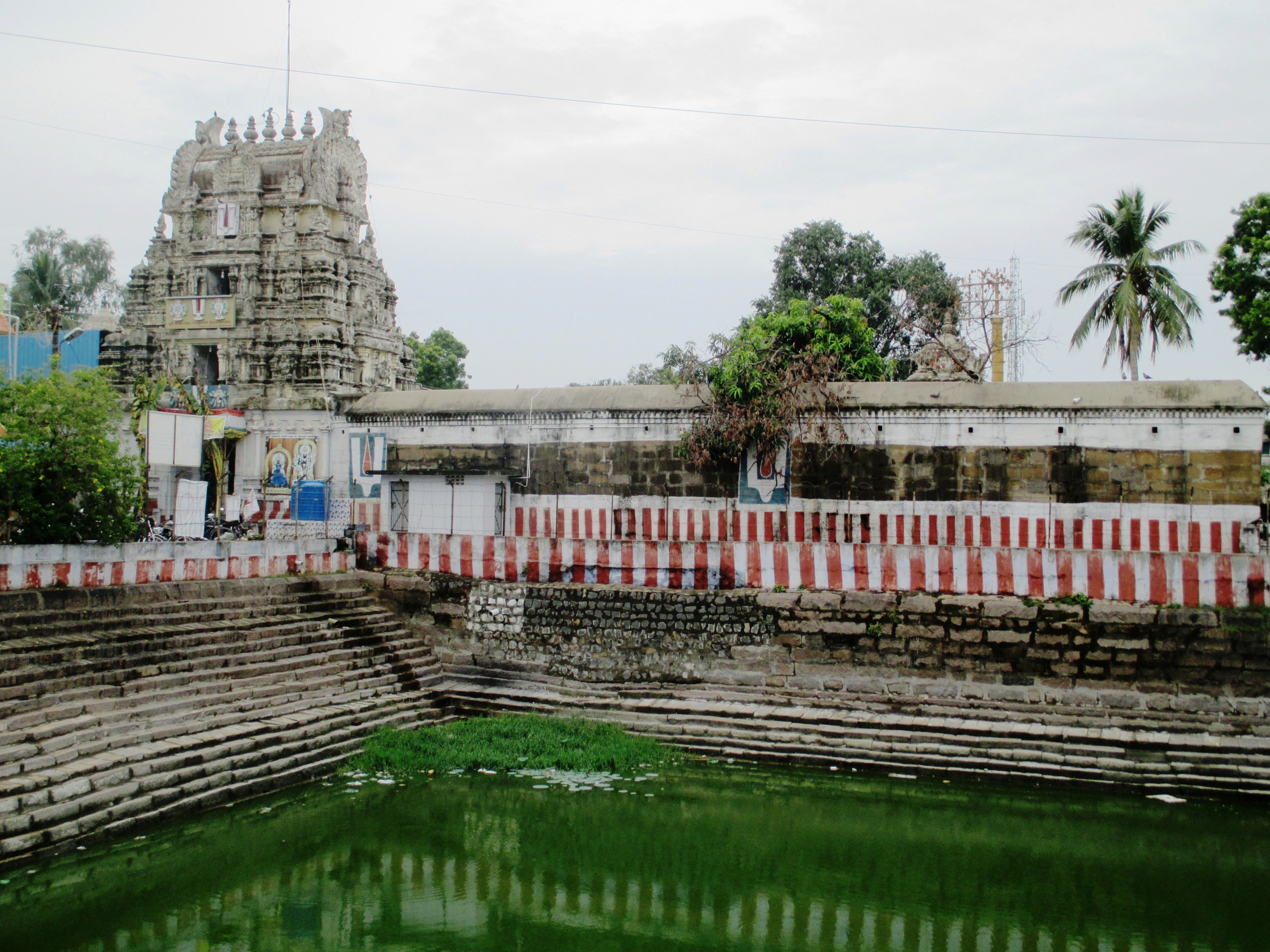

- Location in Tamil Nadu

Religion
- Affiliation: Hinduism
- District: Kanchipuram
- Deity: Adi Kesava Perumal Alamelu Mangai

Location
- Location: Kanchipuram
- State: Tamil Nadu
- Country: India
- Interactive map of Ashtabujakaram
- Coordinates: 12°49′21″N 79°42′39″E

Architecture
- Type: Dravidian architecture

The Ashtabujakaram or Ashtabuja Perumal Temple located in Kanchipuram in the South Indian state of Tamil Nadu, is dedicated to the Hindu god Vishnu. Constructed in the Dravidian style of architecture, the temple is glorified in the Nalayira Divya Prabandham, the early medieval Tamil canon of the Alvar saints from the 6th–9th centuries CE. It is one of the 108 Divya Desams dedicated to Vishnu, who is worshipped as Ashta Bhuja Perumal and his consort Lakshmi as Alamelumangai. This is the 4th largest temple in south Kanchi.

The temple is believed to have been renovated by the Pallavas of the late 8th century CE, with later contributions from Medieval Cholas and Vijayanagara kings. The temple has three inscriptions on its walls, two dating from the period of Kulothunga Chola I (1070–1120 CE) and one to that of Rajendra Chola (1018-54 CE). A granite wall surrounds the temple, enclosing all the shrines and two bodies of water. There is a four-tiered rajagopuram, the temple's gateway tower, in the temple.

Six daily rituals and three yearly festivals are held at the temple. The temple is maintained and administered by the Hindu Religious and Endowment Board of the Government of Tamil Nadu.

== Legend ==
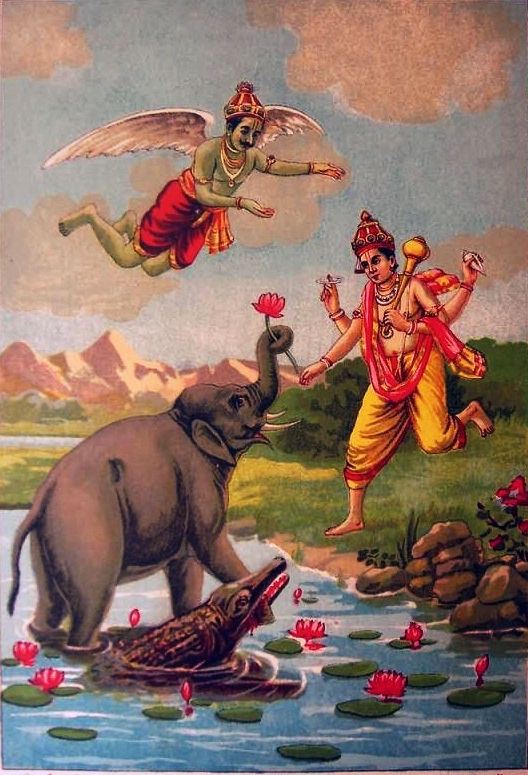
Painting of the Gajendra Moksha legend

According to the temple's regional legend, once, there was an argument between Saraswati, the consort of Brahma, and Lakshmi on their superiority. They went to Indra, the king of the devas. Indra judged Lakshmi to be superior. Not satisfied with his choice, Saraswati went to her husband, Brahma. He also judged Lakshmi to be the superior one.Saraswati was unhappy with the decision and decided to stay away from Brahma. Brahma performed a severe penance praying to Vishnu and also performed an ashvamedha yajna. Saraswati was still angry that the yajna, which was usually done along with consorts, was done alone by Brahma. She tried to disrupt the penance in various ways, including as the river Vegavati/Vega, but Vishnu interfered in all her attempts. After all the malevolent entities who were sent by Saraswati to destroy the penance of Brahma were killed by Vishnu, she finally sent a ferocious sarpam (snake). Vishnu took the form of Ashtabhuja Perumal, holding eight different weapons to kill the snake. The snake is represented as Sharbha in the mandapam of this temple.

Another legend associates this temple to Gajendra moksham given by Vishnu to the elephant king, Gajendra. As per the legend, the elephant Gajendra, the rebirth of Indradyumna, used to worship Vishnu with the lotus fetched from the temple tank every day. Once, while picking up lotus, a crocodile caught the leg of Gajendra, who started calling the name of Vishnu for help. Vishnu sent his discus to punish the crocodile and relieve the elephant. The presiding deity is addressed by various names like Adikesava Perumal, Gajendra Varadhan, and Chakradhar.

== History ==
The temple is originally believed to have been built during the rule of Pallavas. The temple has inscriptions from the period of Kulothunga Chola I (1070 - 1120) indicating gifts of land to the temple. There are contributions mentioned in the same inscription indicating contributions from the local people for perpetual lighting of the temple. There are inscriptions in the Southern walls of the temple from Kulothunga I indicating sale of lands by Rajasundari Chaturvedimangalam to meet the kitchen expenses of the temple. Another inscription from the same period on the same walls indicates gift of tax free land in Chola Chaturvethimangalam to the temple for two years and levying tax of not more than 2 paise per veli subsequently. There are lot of gifts endowed to the temple during the Pallavan kings.

== Architecture ==
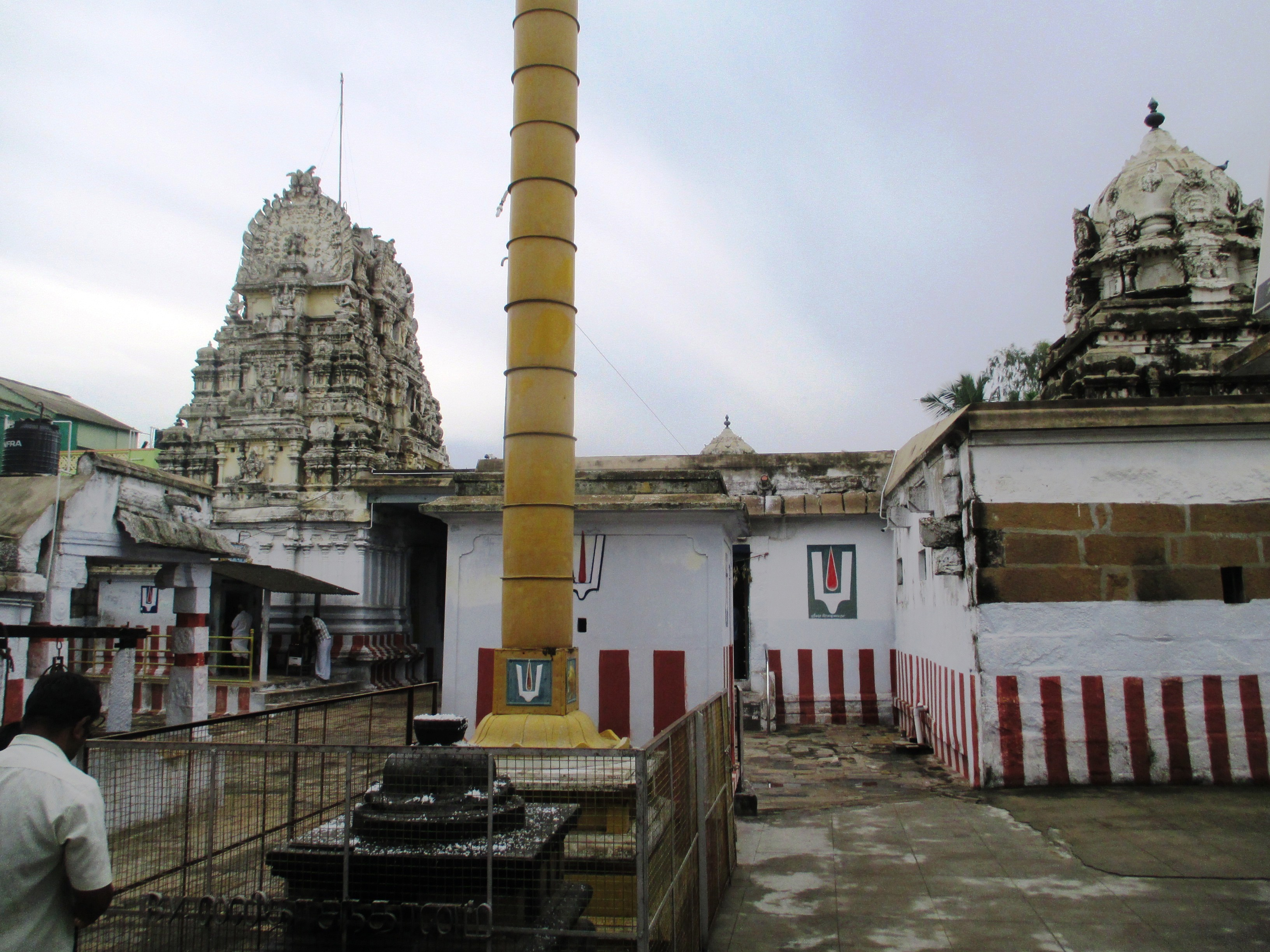
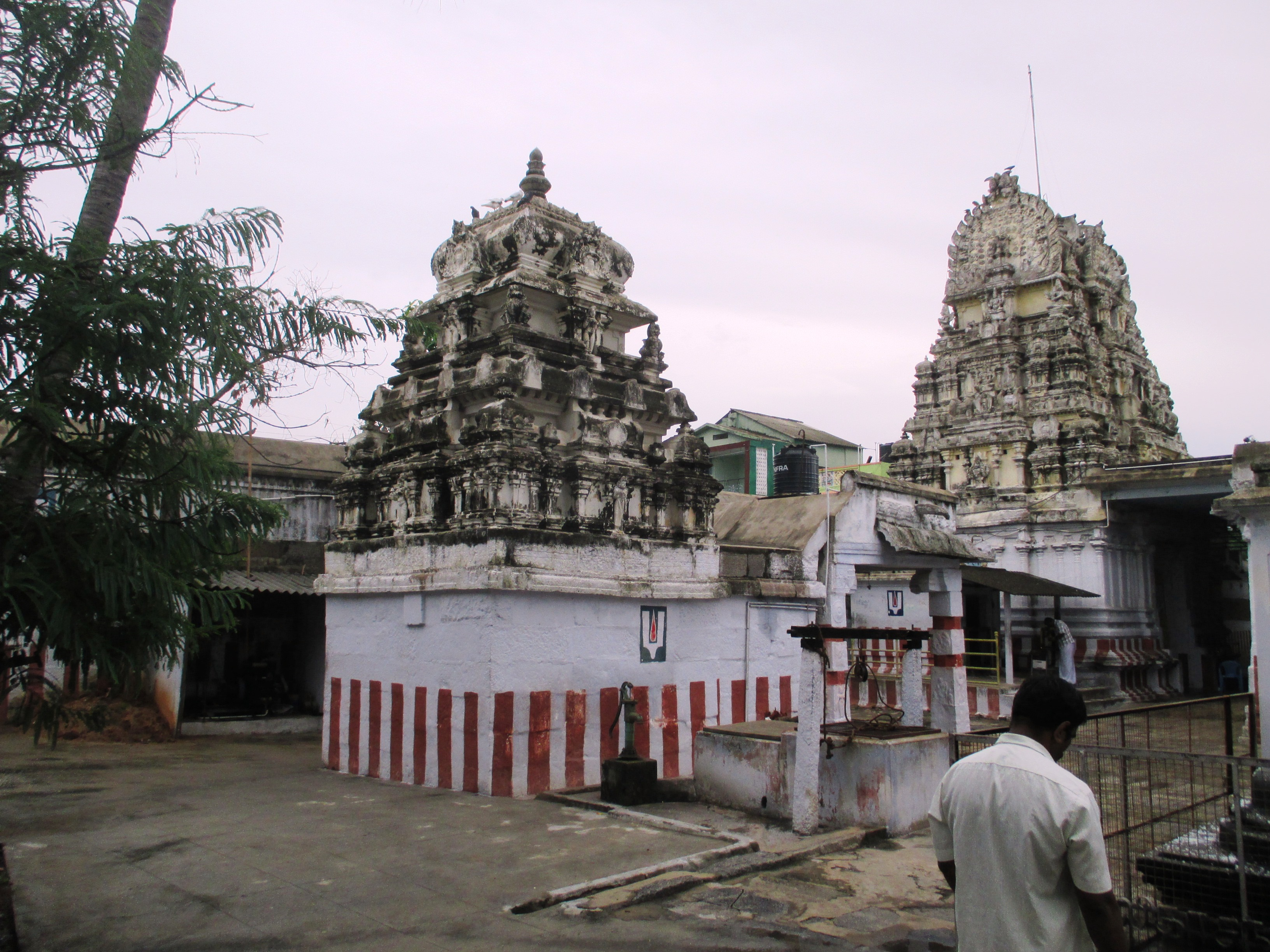
Shrines of the temple

Ashtabhujakaram temple is located in Vishnu Kanchi or Chinna Kanchipuram in Reddypet, located 2 km (1.2 mi) away from Varadaraja Perumal Temple. The temple is a small one with a tank in front and has a three-tiered gopuram (gateway tower) that pierces the concentric rectangular walls. The presiding deity of the temple is Astabhuja Perumal facing West, whose image in the central shrine is sported with eight hands. The eight hands are sported to have a sword, shield, mace, bow, arrow, lotus, conch and chakra. He is seen having Mahalakshmi in his chest and sported with a garland made of shaligrama. There is a separate shrine for Pushpakavalli Thayar, the consort of Perumal. There is a four pillared hall named Friday Mandapam in front of the shrine. It is customary to worship Thayar before proceeding to the worship of Perumal. There is a shrine for Varaha Perumal in the complex, who is sported in seated posture under the hoods of two serpents. The temple also has shrines dedicated to Hanuman, the Alvars, Andal, the Sudarshana Chakra and Sharabha. The temple tank, Gajendra Pushkarani, is located outside the entrance tower.

== Religious importance ==
The temple is revered in Nalayira Divya Prabandham, the 7th–9th century Vaishnava canon, by Pey Alvar and Tirumangai Alvar in one hymn. The temple is classified as a Divya Desam, one of the 108 Vishnu temples that are mentioned in the book. The temple is one of the 14 Divya Desams in Kanchipuram. The temple is believed to be the place where Brahma performed penance seeking the wishes of Vishnu and one of the few places where Brahma worshiped Vishnu. The temple is counted one among the four temples in Kanchipuram that include Yathothkari Perumal Temple, Deepaprakasa Perumal temple and Varadaraja Perumal Temple where the legend of Brahma performing penance is associated. The temple is also revered in the verses of Manavala Maamunigal, Vedanata Desikar and Pillai Perumal Iyengar. Vedanta desikar wrote ashtabujashtakam.

== Festivals and religious practices ==
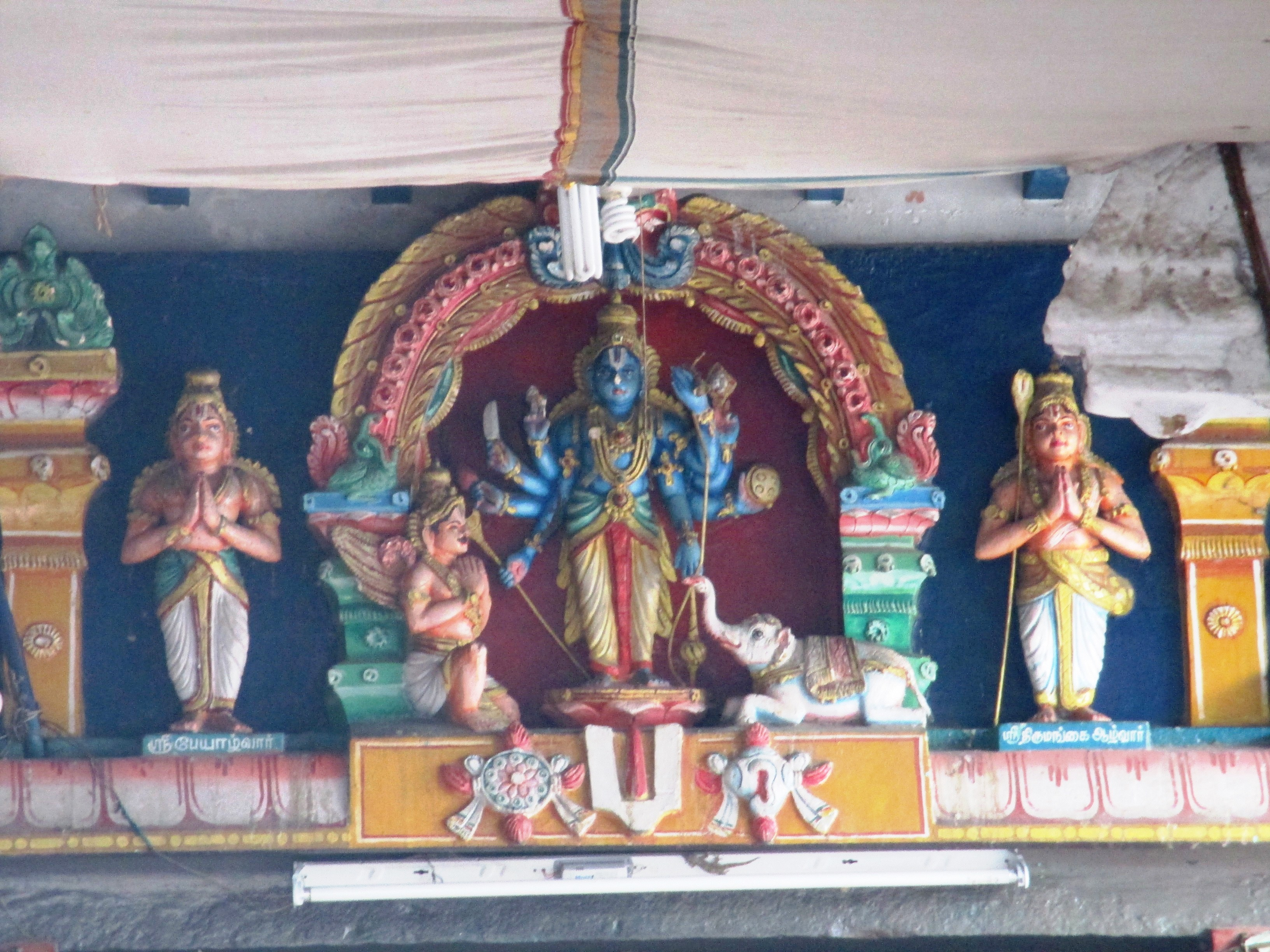
Stucco image of the deity sported with eight hands

The temple follows Tenkalai traditions of the Srivaishnava Vishishtaadvaita sampradaya. The Kanchipuram thathacharyas lost rights of this temple. Ashtabujashtakam was written for this temple.

The temple priests perform the pooja (rituals) during festivals and on a daily basis. As at other Vishnu temples of Tamil Nadu, the priests belong to the Vaishnava community, from the Brahmin class. The temple rituals are performed six times a day: Ushathkalam at 7 a.m., Kalasanthi at 8:00 a.m., Uchikalam at 12:00 p.m., Sayarakshai at 6:00 p.m., Irandamkalam at 7:00 p.m. and Ardha Jamam at 10:00 p.m. Each ritual has three steps: alangaram (decoration), neivethanam (food offering) and deepa aradanai (waving of lamps) for both Govindarajan and Pundarikavalli. During the last step of worship, nadasvaram (pipe instrument) and tavil (percussion instrument) are played, religious instructions in the Vedas (sacred text) are recited by priests, and worshipers prostrate themselves in front of the temple mast. There are weekly, monthly and fortnightly rituals performed in the temple. The 10-day Vaikuntha Ekadashi festival celebrated during the Tamil month of Margazhi (December - January) is the most prominent festival celebrated in the temple. Rama Navami and Navarathri are other prominent festivals celebrated in the temple. Gajendra Moksha festival is celebrated during the Tamil month of Aadi (July - August) in the star of Hastham.

== Sources ==
- M.S., Ramesh (1993). 108 Vaishnavite Divya Desam Volume 1. Tirupati: Tirumala Tirupati Devasthanams.
- Madhavan, Chithra (2007). Vishnu Temples of South India Volume 1 (Tamil Nadu). Chithra Madhavan. ISBN 978-81-908445-0-5.
- R., Dr. Vijayalakshmy (2001). An introduction to religion and Philosophy - Tévarám and Tivviyappirapantam (1st ed.). Chennai: International Institute of Tamil Studies.
