= Metraleeswar temple =

Hindu temple in Tamil Nadu, India

Thiru Metraleeswarar Temple
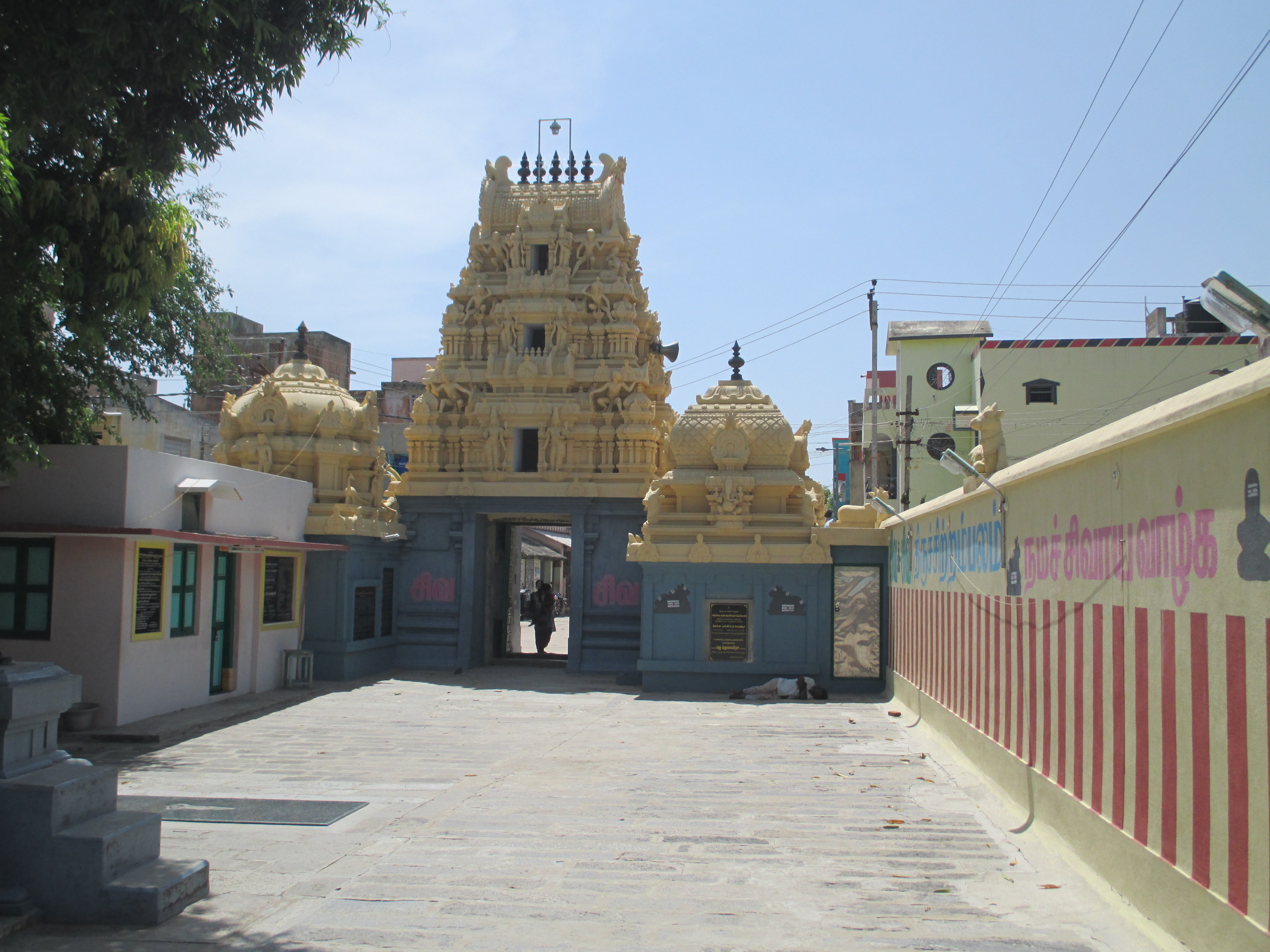

- Location in Tamil Nadu

Religion
- Affiliation: Hinduism
- District: Kanchipuram
- Deity: Metraleeswarar (Shiva) Metralainayagi (Parvathi)

Location
- Location: Kanchipuram
- State: Tamil Nadu
- Country: India
- Coordinates: 12°50′06″N 79°41′30″E

Architecture
- Type: Dravidian architecture

Metraleeswarar Temple (also called Kanchi Metrali) is a Hindu temple to Shiva in the Pillaiyar Palayam area in Kanchipuram, Kanchipuram district in Tamil Nadu, India. Metraleeswarar is mentioned in the 7th-century CE Tamil Saiva canonical work, the Tevaram, and is one of the Paadal Petra Sthalam, the 275 temples revered in the canon. The temple is believed to have expanded during the 13th century by Later Cholas as indicated in the inscriptions.

== Etymology and legend ==
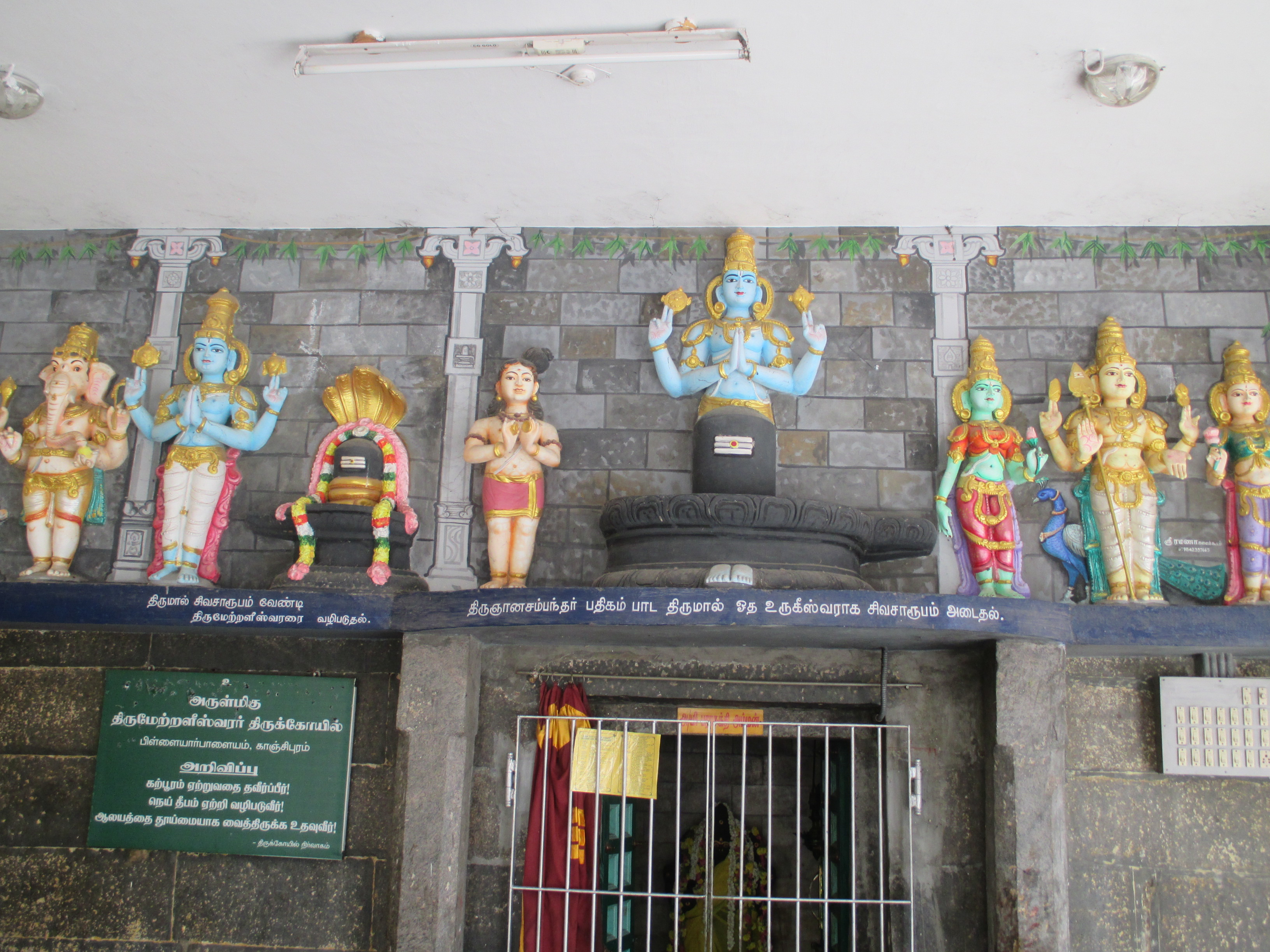
Legend of the temple in stucco image

According to legend Vishnu was doing penance to attain the form of Shiva. Shiva appeared to him and said that he had to continue his penance till Sambandar visited the place and praised him. The deity at the Urugeswarar temple was thus originally Vishnu, who was mesmerized by the devotion of Sambandar and changed to Shiva. It is believed that the 108 Rudras performed penance at this place and hence it is called "Ananda Rudresam" and "Maha Rudresam".

Appar and Sambandar, the 7th-century Tamil Saivite poet, venerated Metralinathar in one verse each in Tevaram, compiled as the First Tirumurai. As the temple is revered in Tevaram, it is classified as Paadal Petra Sthalam, one of the 275 temples that find mention in the Saiva canon. Sundarar mentions that Shiva prefers to reside at this most happening place. There are no historical evidence to assess the exact time the temple was built. There is an inscription in the temple indicating benevolent contributions from during the 13th century by Later Cholas to expand the temple.

== Architecture ==
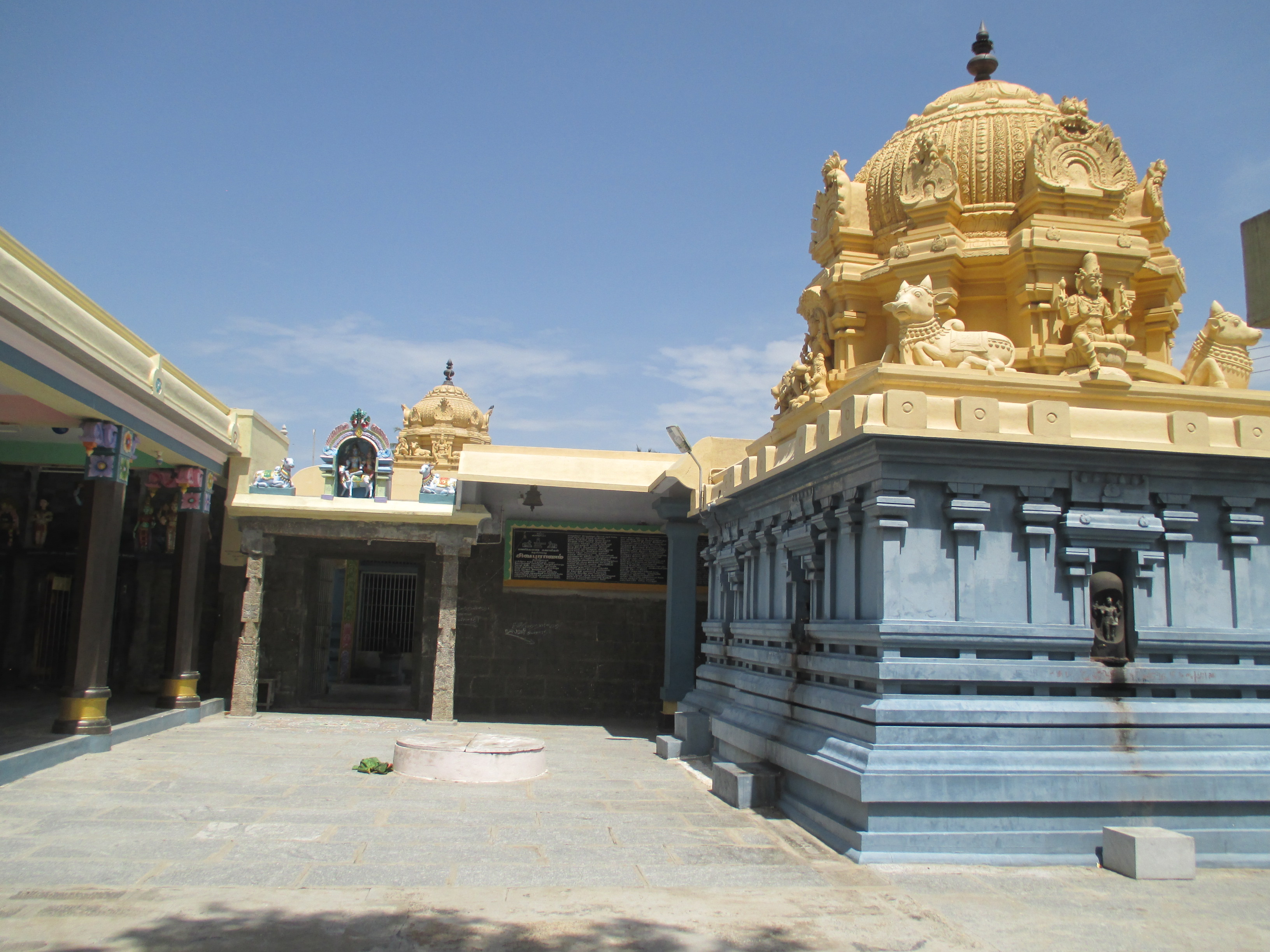
Shrine of the temple

The temple is located in Pillayarpalayam area of Kanchipuram. Metraleeswarar temple complex has two prakarams (outer courtyard) and a three-tiered rajagopuram (gateway tower) facing West. The central shrine faces West and holds the image of Metraleeswarar (Shiva) in the form of lingam made of granite. The other shrine of Shiva following the legend of Vishnu called Otarukeesar, who is believed to have melted at the songs of Sambandar. The temples in Kanchipuram have no separate shrine of Parvathi as it is believed that Kamakshi of Kanchipuram is the common Parvathi shrine for all Shiva temples. But this temple has a separate shrine for Parvathi in the form of Metralinayagi. The granite images of Nandi (the bull and vehicle of Shiva) and the flagstaff is located axial to the sanctum. As in other Shiva temples of Tamil Nadu, the first precinct or the walls around the sanctum of Metraleeswarar has images of Dakshinamurthy (Shiva as the Teacher), Durga (warrior-goddess) and Chandikeswarar (a saint and devotee of Shiva). The shrine of Nataraja, the dancing form of Shiva, has only a printed image unlike other Shiva temples that house an idol of the deity. The temple precinct is surrounded by granite walls. There is a separate shrine for Othu Urugeeswarar which is axial to the main entrance. During the weekly and yearly festivals, Kachabeswarar is given importance over the presiding deity Metraleeswarar.
