= Varadharaja Perumal Temple, Kanchipuram =

Perumal temple in Kanchipuram district, Tamil Nadu, India

Varadharaja Perumal Temple
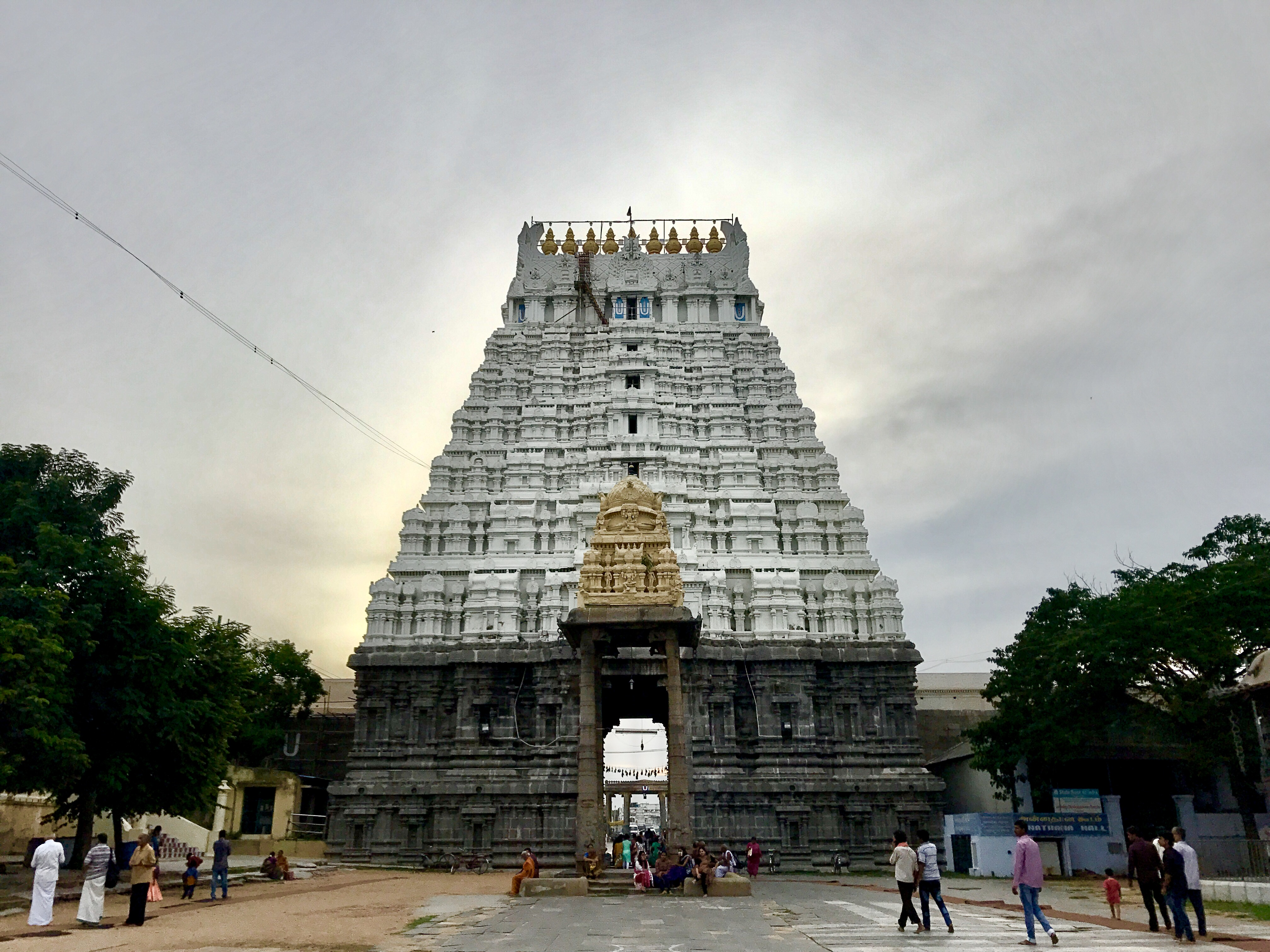
- Gopurams of the temple

- Location in Tamil Nadu

Religion
- Affiliation: Hinduism
- District: Kanchipuram
- Deity: Varadharaja Perumal (Vishnu); Perundevi Thayar (Lakshmi)
- Features: Tower: Punyakoti Vimanam; Kalyana Koti Vimanam; Temple tank: Anantha Theertham

Location
- Location: Kanchipuram
- State: Tamil Nadu
- Country: India
- Coordinates: 12°49′08.4″N 79°43′30.7″E

Architecture
- Type: Dravidian architecture
- Creator: Chola Kings, later Nayaks of Thanjavur
- Completed: 10th century
- Elevation: 102.94 m (338 ft)

Varadharaja Perumal Temple, also called Hastagiri, Attiyuran, Attigiri, Perarulalan Perumal temple, Kanchi koil, Thirukatchi, or Perumal koil is a Hindu temple dedicated to Vishnu located in the city of Kanchipuram, Tamil Nadu, India. It is one of the Divya Desams, the 108 temples of Vishnu believed to have been visited by the 12 poet saints, or the Alvars. It is located in a suburb of Kanchipuram known as the Vishnu Kanchi that is a home for many famous Vishnu temples. One of the greatest Hindu scholars of Vaishnava Vishishtadvaita philosophy, Ramanuja, is believed to have resided in this temple.

The temple along with Ekambareswarar Temple and Kamakshi Amman Temple in Kanchipuram is popularly known as Mumurtivasam (abode of trio), while Srirangam is referred to as: 'Koil' (meaning: "temple") and Tirupati as: 'Malai' (Meaning: "hill"). Among the Divya Desams, Kanchipuram Varadharaja Perumal temple is known as: 'Perumal Koil'. This is one of the most sacred places for Vaishnavites. The fourth of the Divya Desams that completes this series is Melukote, which is known as Thirunarayanapuram. Vaishnavites believe that visiting all four places without a break will guarantee one a place in paramapadam.

There is a temple of Varadharajaswamy in Kurmai of Palamaner mandal called the Kurma Varadharaja Swamy Temple and in Yadamari of Yadamari mandal called the Indrapuri Varadharaja Swamy Temple, both in Chittoor district of Andhra Pradesh.

== Legend ==
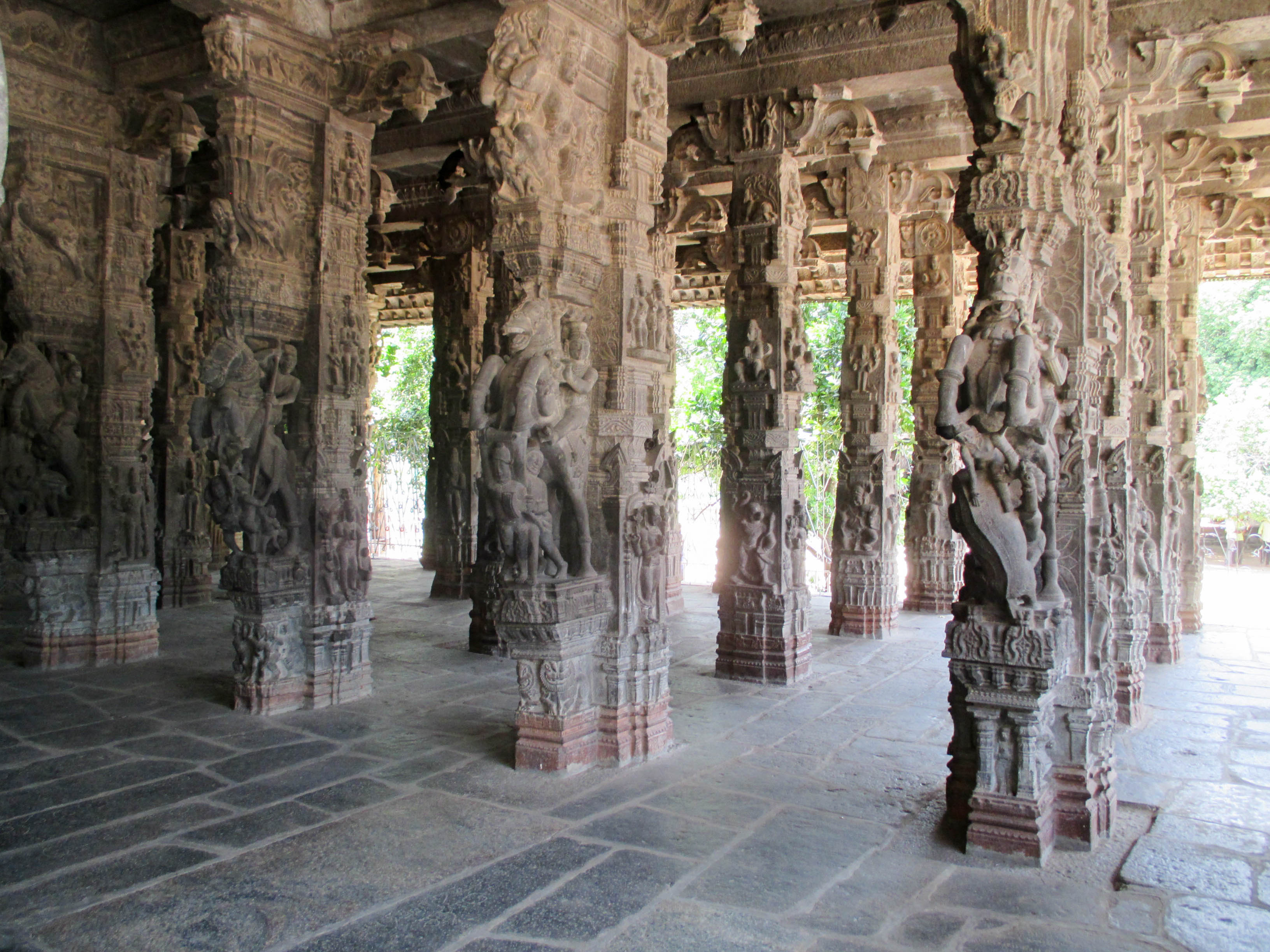
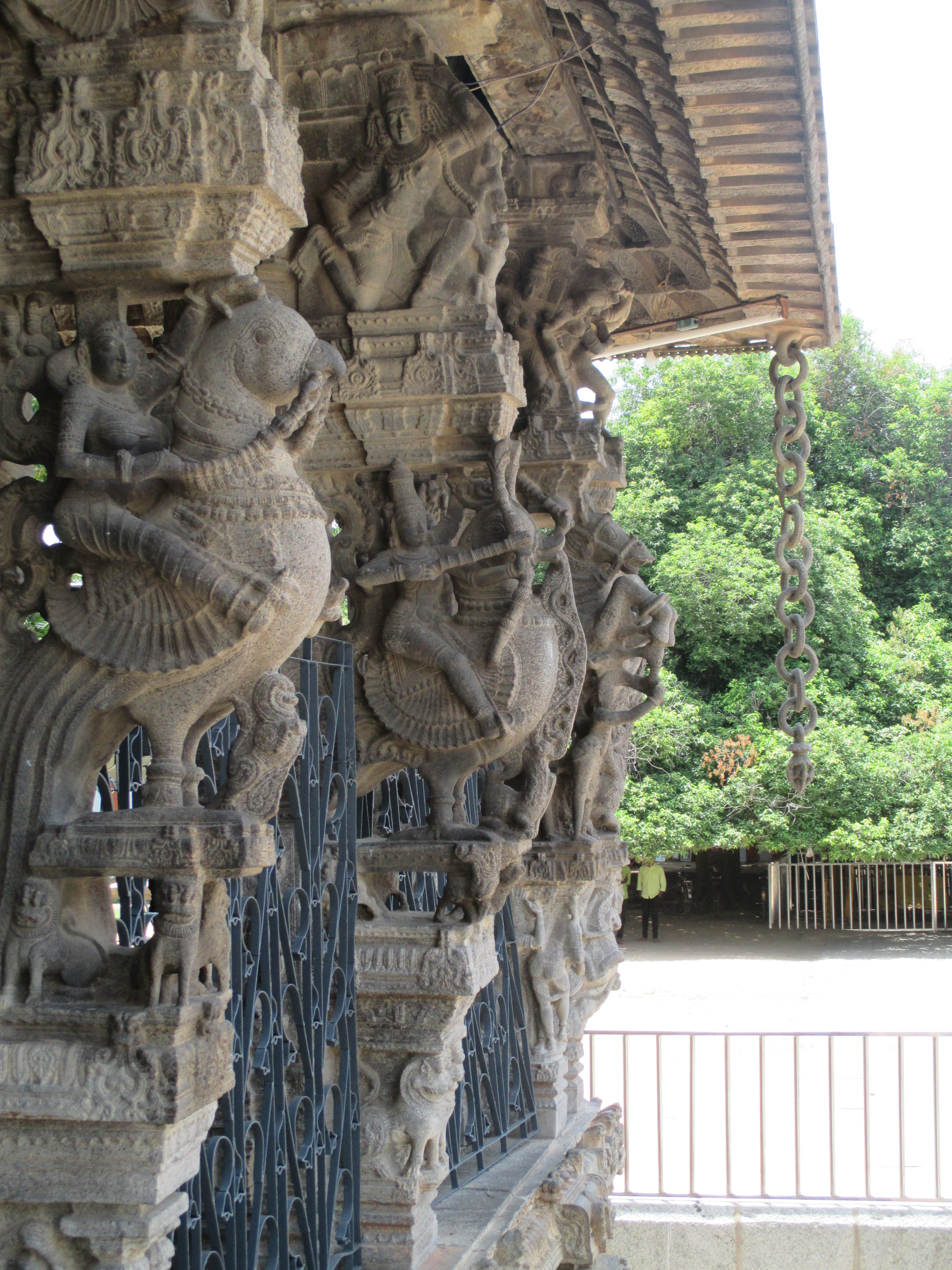
Halls in the temple with sculpted pillars

According to Hindu legend, Saraswati cursed the king of celestial deities, Indra, to become an elephant and roam around the place. He was relieved of the curse with the divine power of Vishnu, who appeared as the mount, Hastagiri. Hastagiri indicates a mount/hill in the form of elephant. Indra, the king of the devas, is believed to have installed the silver and golden lizards in the temple, who were the witness of the ordeal, after being released from the curse of the goddess Saraswati. Brahma performed a yagna here, the site of which was about to be washed away by the fast flowing river Vegavati (Saraswati in the form of river), known today as the Palar River. The temple deity, Vishnu, laid himself flat to stay the flow and the yagna was successfully performed.

Vishnu emerged with brilliance of thousand Suns as Varadharajaswamy inside the athi tree, and stayed here permanently until he was submerged in nearby tank since the deity came from yagna done by Brahma (Historically speaking, his placement may have been due to fear of invasion by the Delhi Sultanate). As is the case with the association of South Indian temples with a sacred tree, a name of the temple, Attigiri, is derived from the atti tree (fig), considered sacred to Vaishnavas as well as other Hindus. There is the replacement stone deity found inside the temple, next to the Narasimha shrine. The stone deity is called Devaraja Perumal, whose worship is equated to the Adi Athi Varadharaja Perumal (original idol made from fig tree), that is, two idols being inhabited by the same deity.

According to a Hindu legend, Brahma, the Hindu god of creation, separated with his wife Saraswati over a misunderstanding. He performed the ashvamedha sacrifice, seeking boons from Vishnu. Vishnu was pleased by the devotion, and came out from under the earth as a boar, making Saraswati unite with Brahma. Another legend states that the disciples of the sage Gautama were cursed to become lizards. They resided in the temple, and were relieved of the curse by the divine grace of Vishnu. There is a panel in the temple where the two lizards are depicted in the roof of the temple.

Thirukkachi Nambigal (also known as Kanchi Purnar) was an ardent devotee of this temple. He used to bring flowers everyday from Poovirundhavalli, where he maintained a garden. He performed the rituals of the Aalavatta Kaingariyam, waving to produce breeze with the help of a hand fan. It is believed that Vishnu as Varadharaja used to converse with him, while he was performing the ritual.

Nambi also composed the Devarajaashtakam (a Sanskrit poem of 8 verses) for the presiding deity. Ramanuja, an influential Vaishnava preceptor, is regarded to have received answers to his six questions from Varadharaja. through Thirukkachi Nambigal.

== History ==
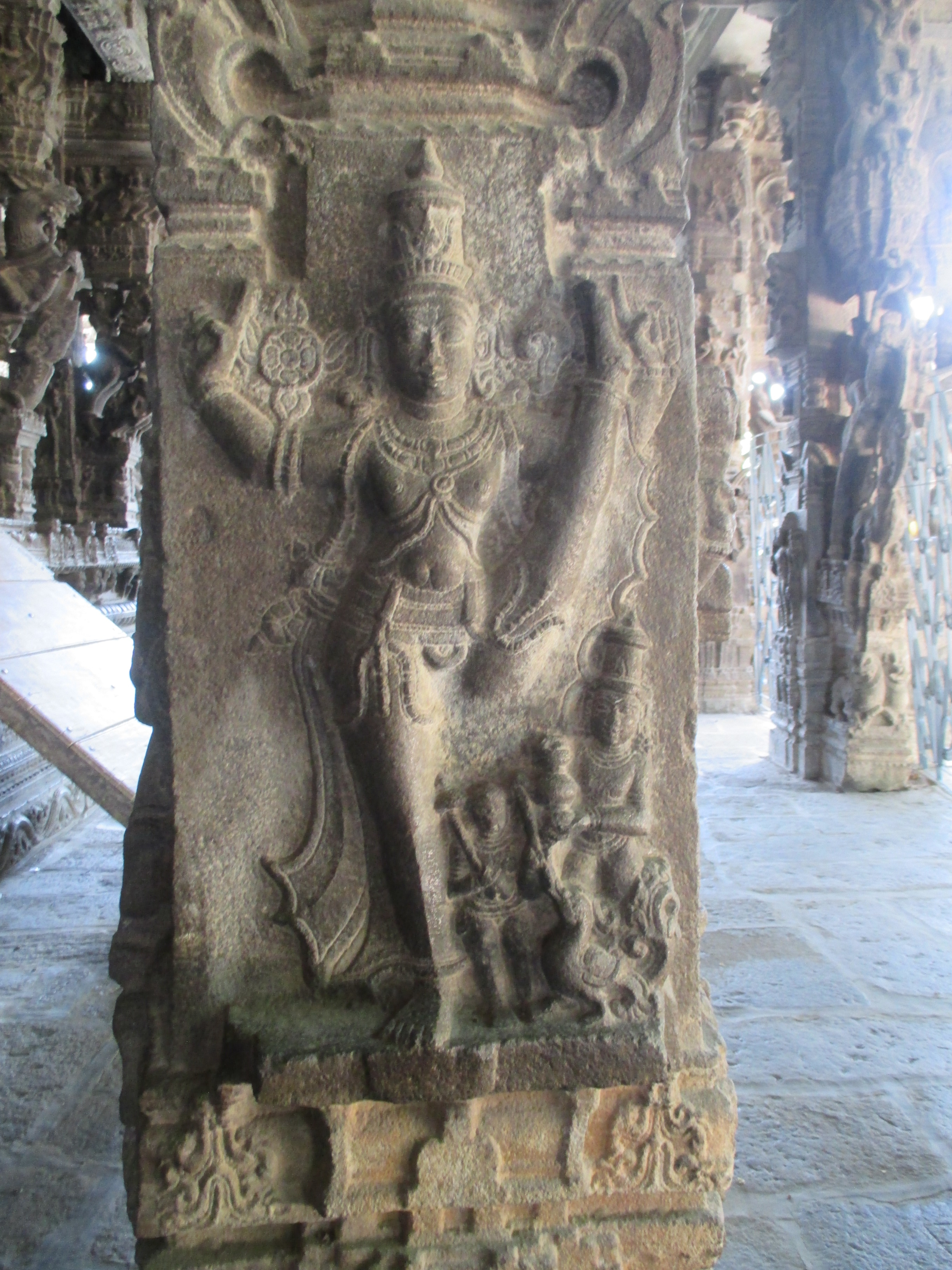
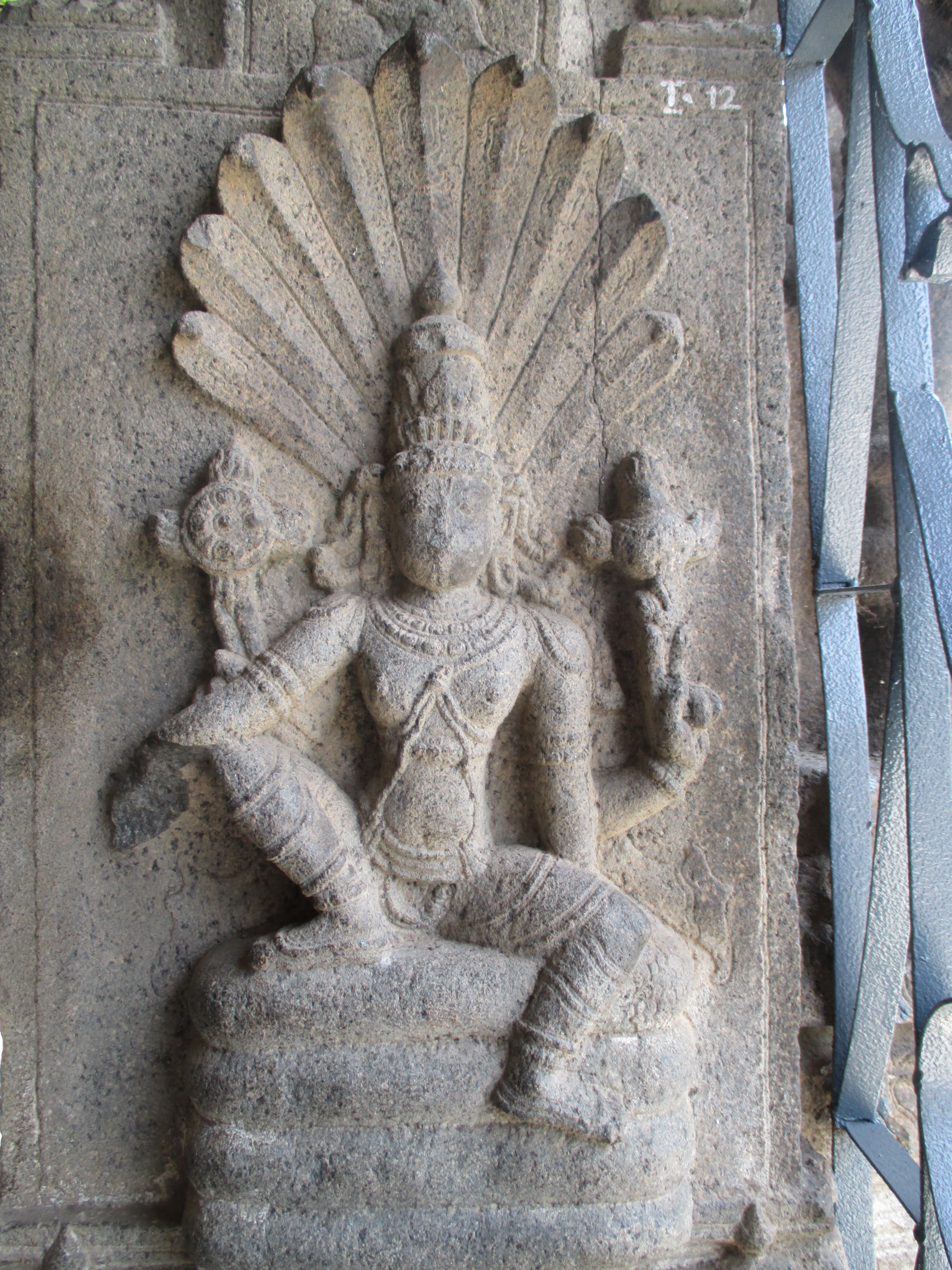
Halls in the temple with sculpted pillars

The temple has around 350 inscriptions from various dynasties like Chola, Pandya, Kandavarayas, Cheras, Kakatiya, Sambuvaraya, Hoysala and Vijayanagara indicating various donations to the temple and also the political situation of Kanchipuram. Varadharaja Perumal Temple was renovated by the Cholas in 1053 and it was expanded during the reigns of the great Chola kings Kulottunga Chola I and Vikrama Chola. In the 14th century another wall and a gopura was built by the later Chola kings. When a Mughul invasion was expected in 1688, the main image of the deity was sent to Udayarpalayam, now part of Tiruchirappalli district. It was brought back with greater difficulty after the involvement of local preceptor who enlisted the services of general Todarmal. Robert Clive, the British general during the colonial period visited the Garuda seva festival and presented a valuable necklace (now termed Clive Maharkandi), which is adorned during a special occasion every year. At present the administration is carried out by Hindu Religious and Endowment of the Government of Tamil Nadu.

The old inscriptions and records of the temple states that several leaders like Vyasatirtha and Satya-Vijaya Tirtha from the Dvaita school of Vedanta had evinced interest in this temple. An epigraph of the temple datable to 1511 CE records that the Dvaita saint and Kulaguru of Krishnadevaraya, Vyasatirtha presented a village and serpant vehicle to Varadharaja Temple and instituted a festival in honour of Vijayanagara king Krishnadevaraya. Another record dated 1726 CE mentions that another Dvaita saint and Peetadhipathi of Uttaradi Matha by the name Satyavijaya Tirtha was honoured in the temple with some privileges. As Raghava Iyengar mentions in his work Sasana Tamil Kavi Saritham, an inscription at the temple indicates that Parimelalhagar, who wrote his commentary of the Tirukkural around 1271–1272 CE, belonged to the lineage of priests of Ulagalandha Perumal temple.

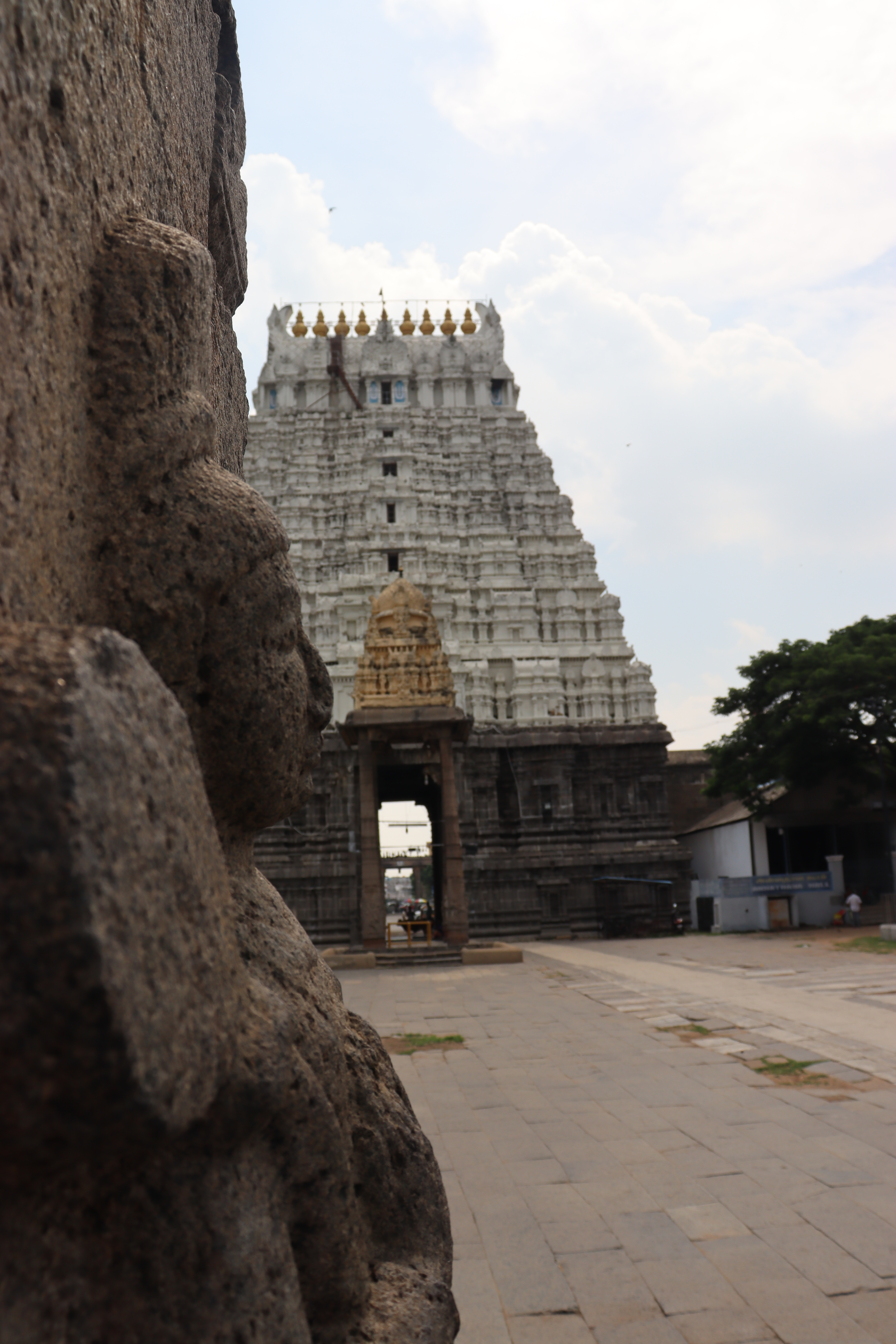
View of the rajagopuram from near a pillar at the entrance

There are inscriptions dated 1532 CE (record 544 of 1919) indicating the gift of number of villages made by Achutaraya. Vira Narasingaraya Saluva Nayaka who was directed by Achutaraya broke the royal order by giving more lands to Ekambaranathar temple than the Varadharaja Swamy temple against the instruction of an equal gift to either of the temples. Achutaraya on hearing this equally distributed the lands to both the temples. There is an inscription from the 13th century from the Hoysalas, indicating a gift of a crown to the presiding deity. During the 17th century, the temple was under the attacks from the Mughals, spearheaded by Aurangzeb. The deities of the temple were ported to Udayarpalayam in modern-day Tiruchirappalli district during 1688. It was only during 1710 that the situation was ripe for the deities to be returned. But the chieftain of Udayarpalayam opposed the move and only after the intervention of Paramahamsa Parivajakacharya Attan Jeer, the deities were returned. The event is commemorated as a festival in the temple.

The Thathacharyas are the custodians of the Kanchipuram Perarulalan Kovil popularly known as Varadharaja Perumal temple. They are the Pradhana Acharya Purushas in the protocol to receive and deliver the temple honours. In retrospection Tirumalai Nambi's son Tirukkurukai Piran Pillan was ordained by Ramanuja himself as the first and foremost among the 74 Peetadhipathis to propagate Visishtadwaita philosophy after him. Pillan was also chosen by Ramanuja as the competent person to write the commentary on the Tiruvaymoli. The annotation of Tiruvaymoli thus brought out by Pillan under the behest of Ramanuja is called the famous 'Araiyarpadi' the first gloss in Manipravala, an elegant mixture of Tamil and Sanskrit words, on the Divya Prabhandam. After Pillan, Tirumalai Srinivasacharya Thathacharya in the fifth generation of Thathacharyas was installed by Sri Vedanta Desika as the Sri Kariyam of the Devaraja Swamy Kovil. Since then the office of Sri Kariyam is institutionalised in the diligence and devotion of the Thathacharyas to the Varadharaja Perumal temple in Kanchipuram. Lakshmi Kumara Thathachariar inherited this mantle from his ancestors and made epoch making contributions to the temple annals. He was the Sri Kariya Durandhara – a phrase connoting absolute dedication and authority – of the temple affairs. Simultaneously he was also the Raja Guru of the Vijayanagar king Venkatapathi Deva Maharaj. In Ayengarkulam, a village named after him near Kanchipuram, he built a tank and temple to Sri Rama and Hanuman.

The temple is maintained and administered by the Hindu Religious and Charitable Endowments Department of the Government of Tamil Nadu, having the Thathachariars as the Honorary Trustees.

== Architecture ==
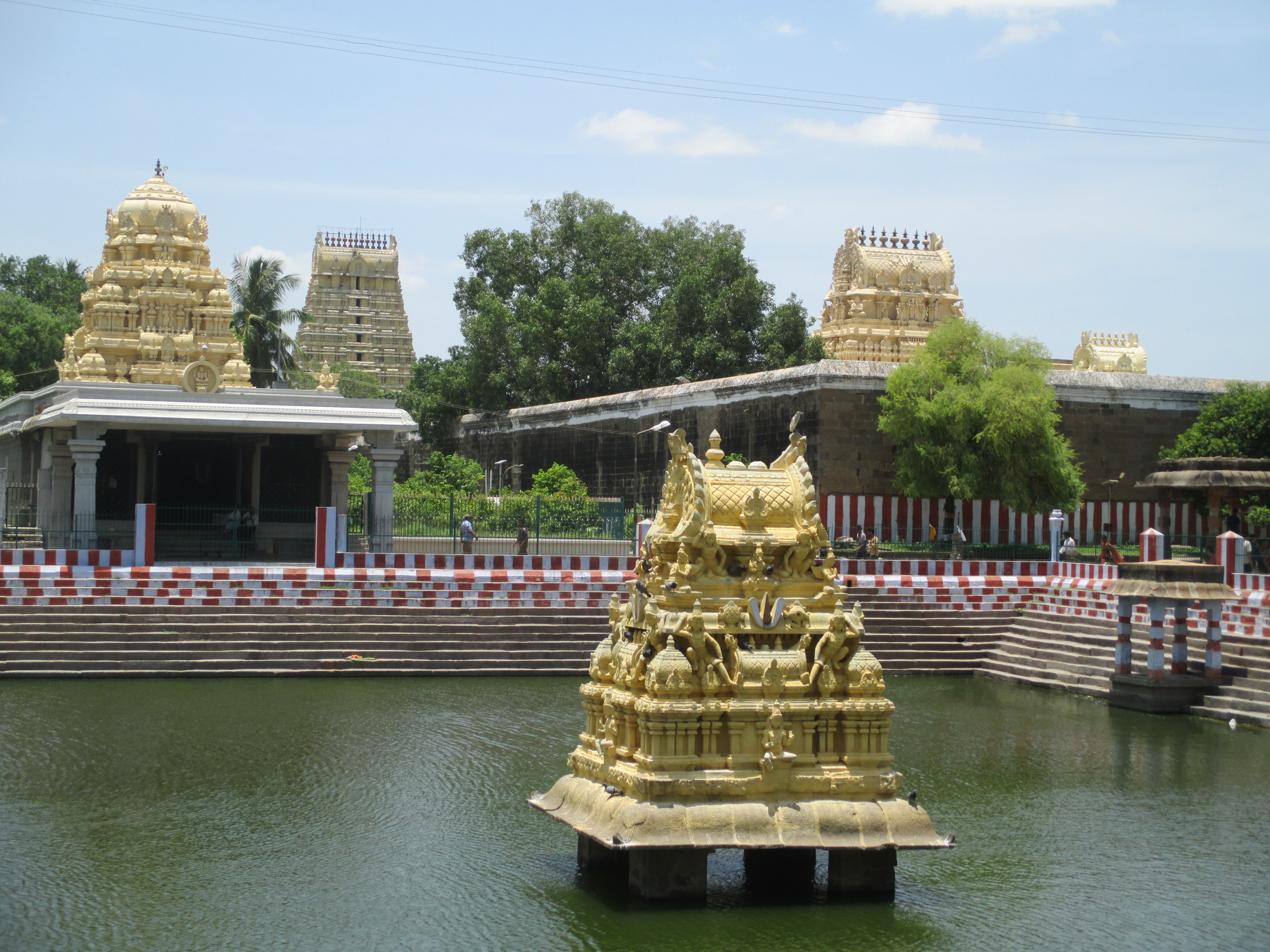
Images in the temple

The temple is present in Chinna Kanchipuram, a locality in the Eastern side of Kanchipuram, a South Indian town in the state of Tamil Nadu. The temple covers an area of 9.5-hectare (23.5-acre), showcasing the architectural skills of ancient Vishwakarma Sthapathis in temple architecture, and is famous for its holiness and ancient history. It is the biggest temple in Kanchi, with most perumals, largest area, and largest gopuram. The temple has three outer precincts (prakarams), namely, Alvar Prakaram, Madai Palli Prakaram and Thiru Malai Prakaram. There are 32 shrines, 19 vimanams (towers), 389 pillared halls (most having the lion type yali sculpture) and sacred tanks some of which located outside the complex. The temple tank is called Anantha Theertham. There are 96 ornate sculpted pillars depicting various legends of Mahabharat and Ramayana. The most notable sculptures are of Rati, Manmatha, Lakshmi Narayana, Lakshmi Narasimha, Lakshmi Varaha, and Lakshmi Hayagreeva.

The main sanctum faces west and can be entered through a 40 metres (130 ft)-tall, 7-tiered rajagopuram (main gateway tower). The image of the presiding deity is designed in such a way that on the 15th day after Chitra Purnima, the rays of the Sun fall on the idol. The hill, called Hastagiri, is 360 metres (1,180 ft) long by 240 metres (790 ft). The eastern gopuram is taller than the western gopuram, which is contrasting to large temples where the rajagopuram is the tallest one. One of the most famous architectural pieces in the temple is the huge stone chain sculpted in a single stone. There is a 100 pillared hall which has sculptures depicting Ramayana and Mahabharata. It is a masterpiece of Vijayanagara architecture.

Hastagiri has murals of the late Vijayanagara Empire on the ceiling. Another significant features of the temple are beautifully carved lizards and gilded with gold, over the sanctum. The vimana over the sanctum of Varadharaja Swami is called Punyakoti Vimanam and the one over Perundevi Thayar shrine is called Kalyana Koti Vimanam.

Apart from the main stone idol, the temple has the wooden image of Varadharajaswamy made of Atthi or the fig tree and preserved under water in a secret chamber. It is brought out for worship once every 40 years. The festivities last 48 days after which it is immersed in the water and stored for the next 40 years. It is believed that there is a heavy downpour after the idol is immersed to fill the tank. The presiding deity is a 3.0 metres (10 ft) tall idol made of granite in standing posture, while Thayar is a 1.2 metres (4 ft) image in sitting posture. There is a shrine of Narasimha on the hillock. The origin of the mask of Narasimha is mysterious and believed to possess inexplicable powers.

In the second precinct downstairs contains four shrines, of which the important one is of Malayala Nachiar (Kerala consort), presumably built during the Chera kings in the early 14th century. There are images of Alvars and Ramanuja in the second precinct.

The third precinct has the shrine of the Hindu goddess Perundevi Thayar; it is customary for devotees to visit the shrine first before visiting the main Perumal shrine. There are four small pillared halls, identical in structure, called Thulabara Mandapas built during the 1532 for a ceremony of Achyutaraya of the Vijayanagara Empire.

The seven precincts are called Pradakshina Padha, Hastagiri Pradakshana, Madapalli Pragara, Alavandar Pragara, and Alvar Thiruveedhi. The Alavandar Pragara houses lot of shrines of the temple. The temple has two towers on the eastern and western sides, which are 55 metres (180 ft) and 49 metres (160 ft) tall respectively. There is a hundred pillared hall, which has ornate carvings, notable of which being a stone chain. The temple car is believed to have been donated by Krishnadevaraya in 1517 CE. There are paintings in the temple commissioned during the 16th century during the rule of Vijayanagara kings.

There is a shrine of Chakratalvar on the eastern side of the temple tank. This is biggest chakrathazhvar in India. The image of Chakratalvar (Sudarshana) in the temple is depicted with six hands. There festival image of the temple has seven different images of Sudarshana depicted within the same chakra. There are two entrances to the shrine as the two images are considered to be separate. The shrine is believed to have been constructed during the time of Kulothunga III during 1191 CE by Ilavalagan Kalingarayan of Nettur as seen from the inscriptions in the temple. The later additions are presumably made by the Vijayanagara Empire during the 13th or early part of 14th century. The kings also added pillared columns in the leading hall sculpted with figures from Ramayana and various forms of Vishnu.

== Literature ==
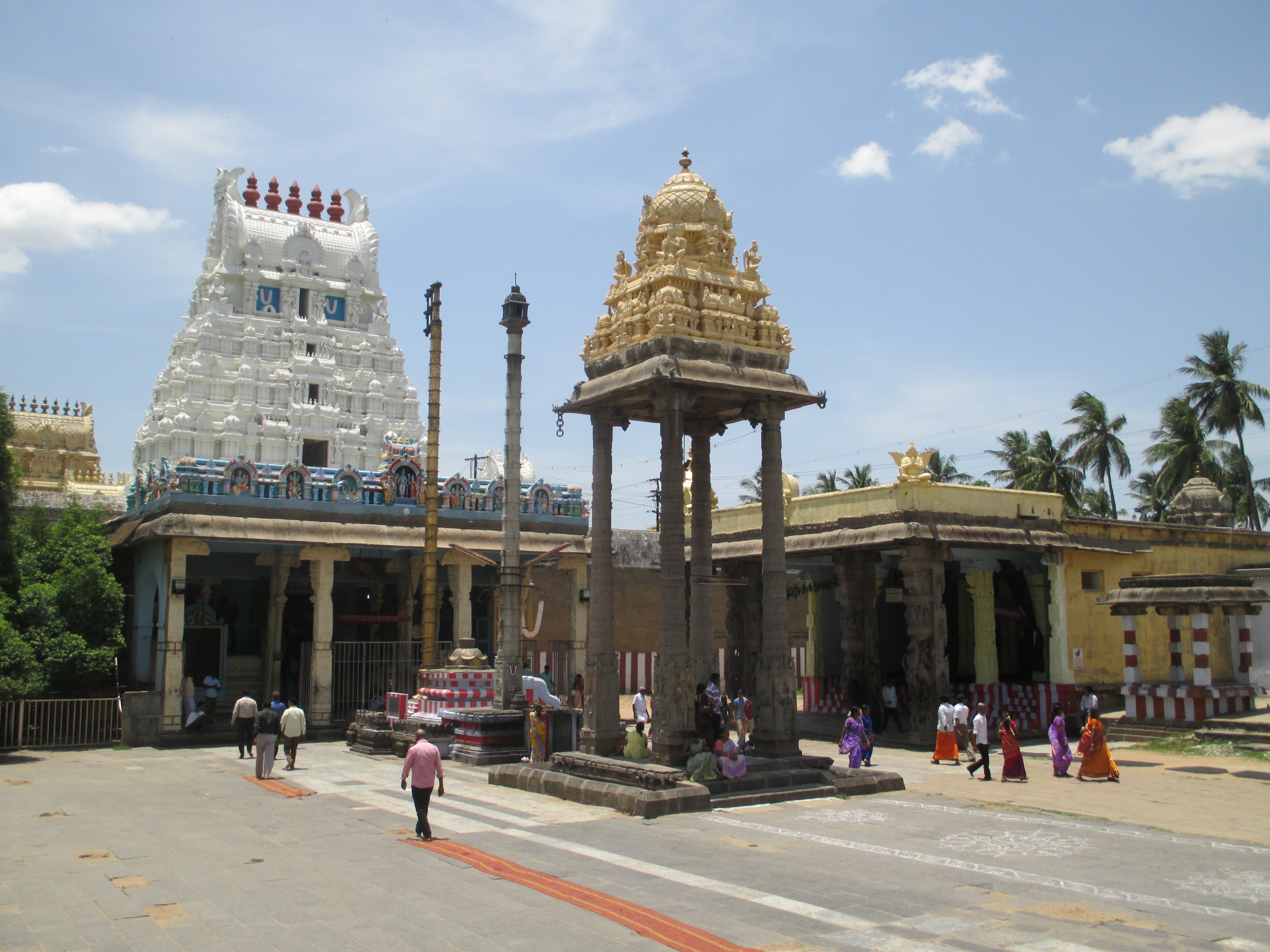
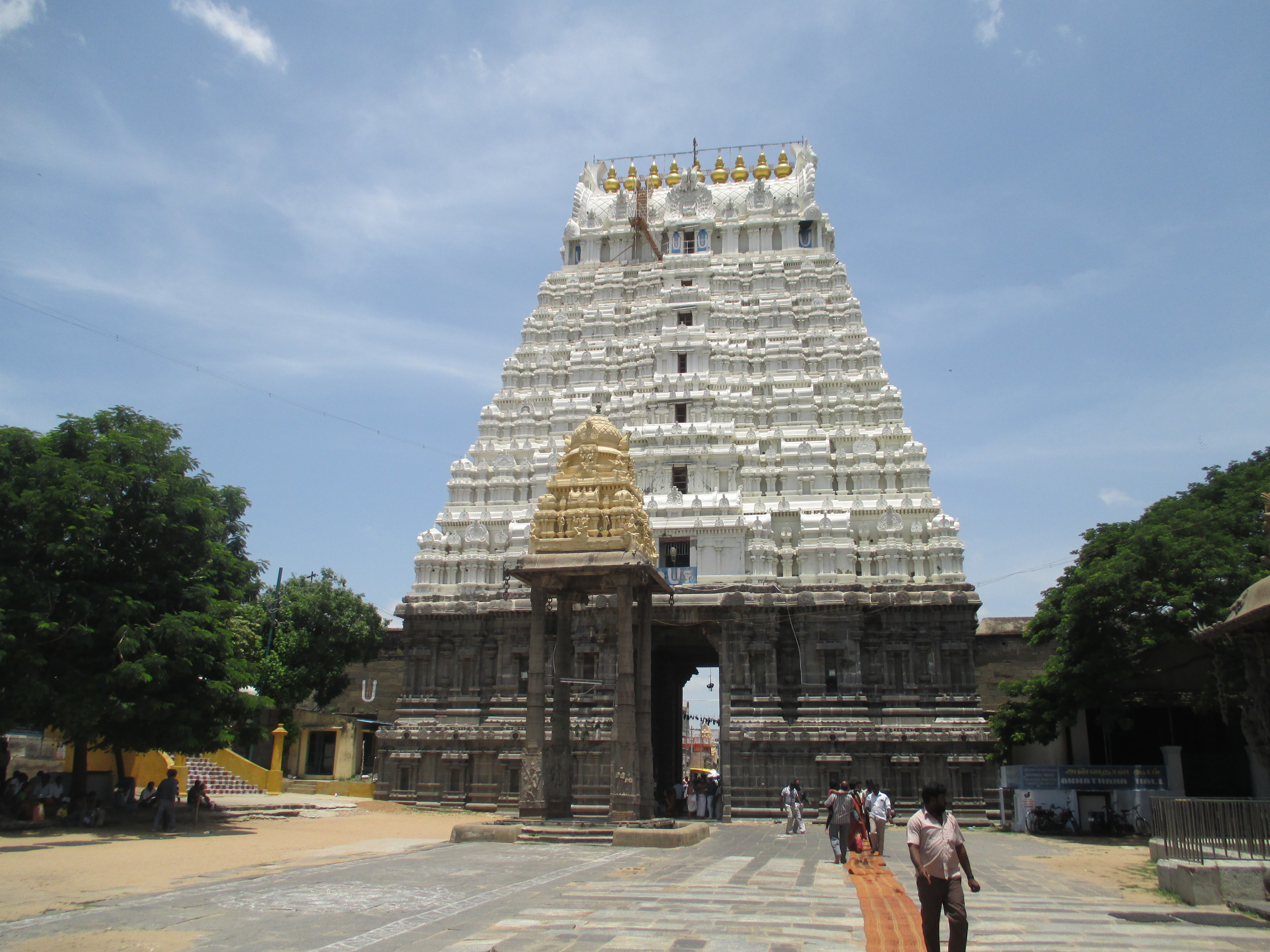
Halls in the temple with sculpted pillars

The temple is often mentioned as the divine source of Sri Vaishnava literature. Thirumangai Alvar spent all his wealth and taxes towards the building of the temple and the king punished him for not paying the taxes, and losing wealth of the kingdom. A divine voice informed the king in his dreams that he can pickup wealth from a nearby place and relieve Thirumangai Alvar. Thirukachi Nambi was an ardent devotee of Varadharaja. He used to come a long way everyday to the temple to offer his worship. During his old age, he was privileged to converse with god. Ramanuja, the preceptor of Vishishtadvaita philosophy, was tricked by his master and was plotted to be killed. But by the grace of divinity, he was masked as a hunter and escape the event. He later came back to the temple to the making of the Vaishnava philosophy.

Vedanta Desika, the revered polymath next only to Ramanuja mentions the annual ten-day festival celebrated in May. In one of the verses, he extols the deity:

"He is the single root-source for this entire universe,
beginning with space, and all other elements;
like the pupil in the eye of the Vedas."

The temple also finds mention in the Thirtha Prabandha, a travelogue with descriptions of pilgrim centers throughout India written by Sri Vadiraja Swamy.

Tyagaraja and Muthuswami Dikshitar, the celebrated composers of the 18th century created compositions on the festival. Thirumangai Alvar wrote four pasurams (hymns), Bhoothathalvar wrote two, and Peyalvar penned one.

Sri Alluri Venkatadri Swamigal composed more than 200 keerthanams about Varadharaja Perumal.

== Festival and religious practices ==
It is the only major srivaishnava temple with priority to vedam in Tamil Nadu, with the largest vedam recitation group in any divyadesam in Tamil Nadu, second most being Thiruvaheendrapuram. 3 azhvars have sung about this perumal. (Boothath, Pey, Thirumangai)

=== Atthi Varadhar ===
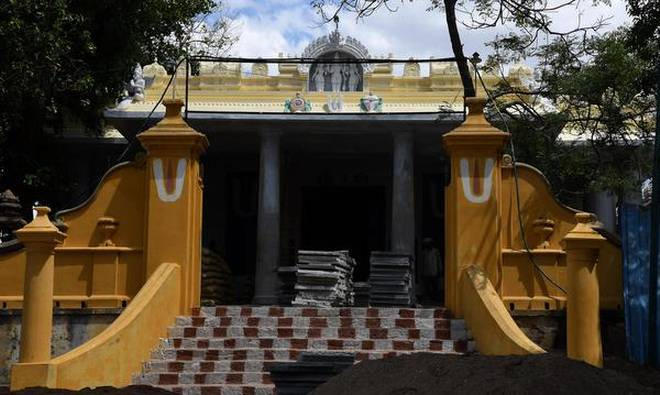
Vasantha Mantapam, where Atthi Varadar is worshipped for 48 days after every 40 years.

Atthi Varadharaja Perumal (Atthi Varadar), the 3.0 metres (10 ft) deity image, is made of the Atthi or the fig tree, and is stored in an underground chamber inside the temple tank which is called the Anantha Sarovaram/ Anantha Saras. It is brought out to worship for 48 days after every 40 years. It is worshipped in the Vasantha Mantapam, which located in the south-west corner of the temple. The Aththi Varadar is worshipped in sleeping posture (Kidantha Thirukkolam or Sayana Kolam) in the first 24 days, followed by standing position (Nindra Thirukkolam) in the next 24 days.

The icon, which was the presiding deity earlier, was hidden in the 16th century to protect from invaders; however replaced by the current stone central icon when the wooden icon could not be traced. In 1709, the icon was accidentally rediscovered when the temple tank was emptied; thereafter the tradition of worshipping the deity once in 40 years was established.

Earlier documented dates about the rise are:

- 2 July 1979
- 12 July 1939
- June 1892
- Aug 1854

== Gallery ==
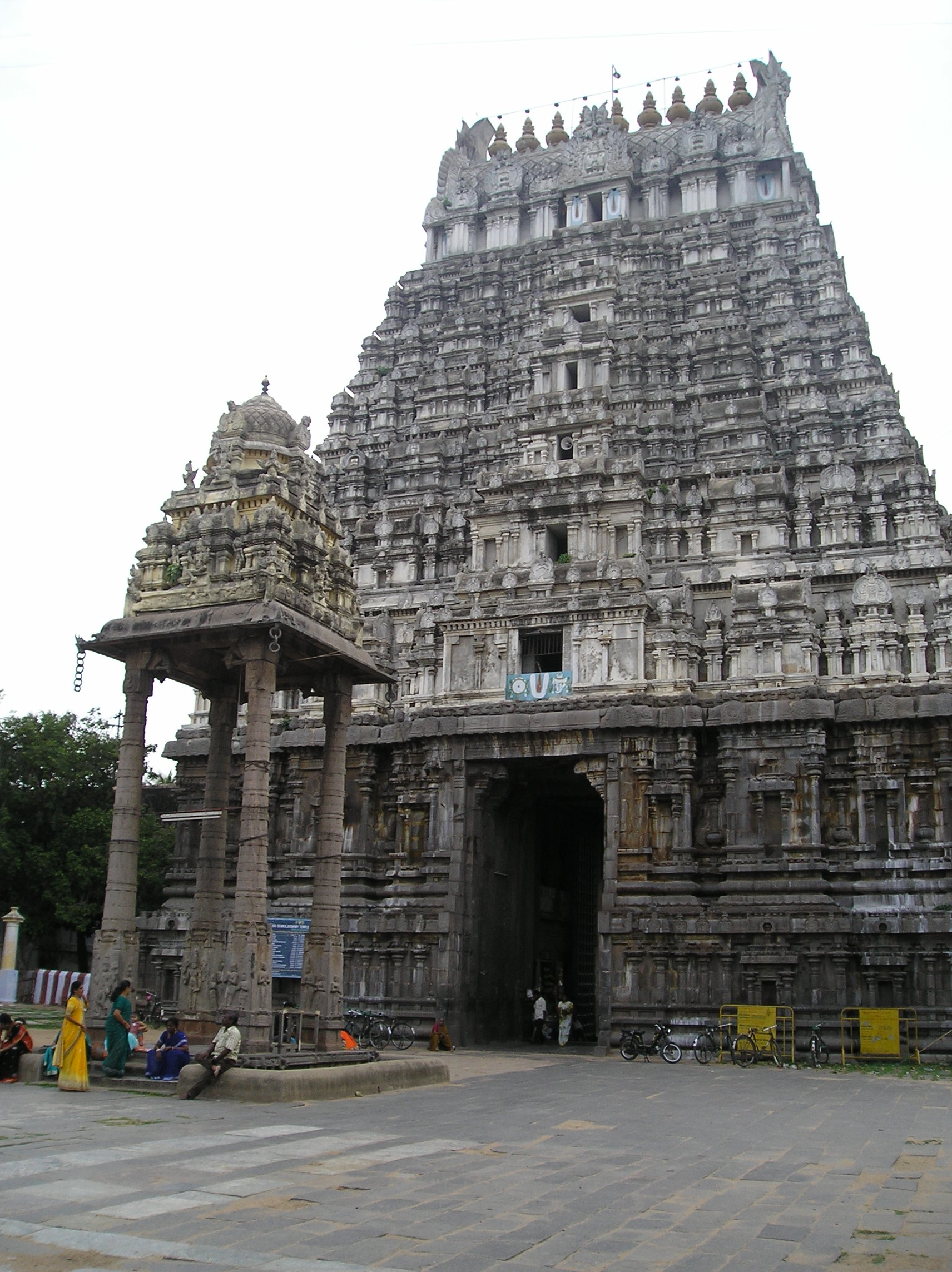
Gopuram View

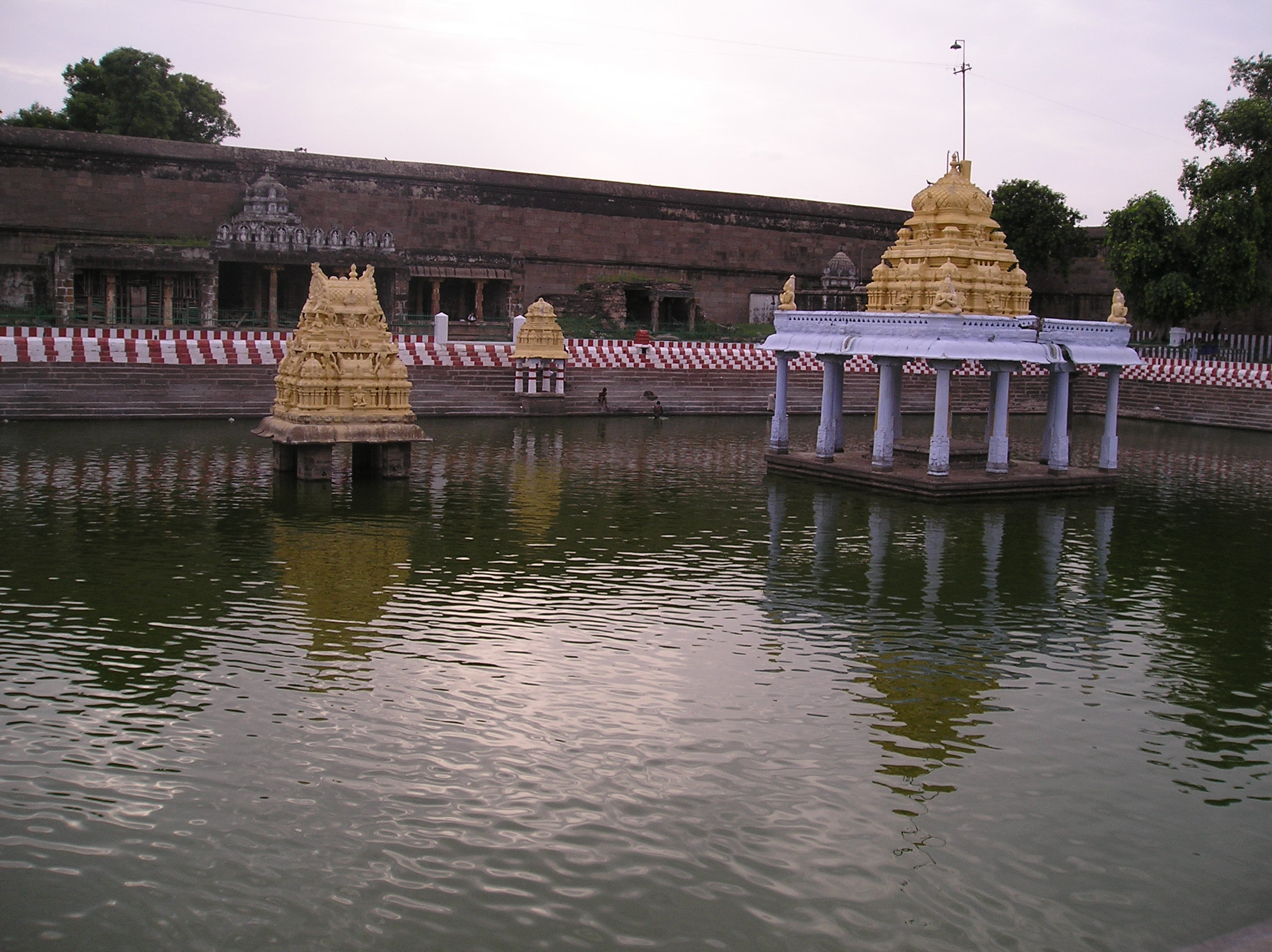
Theertham Tank

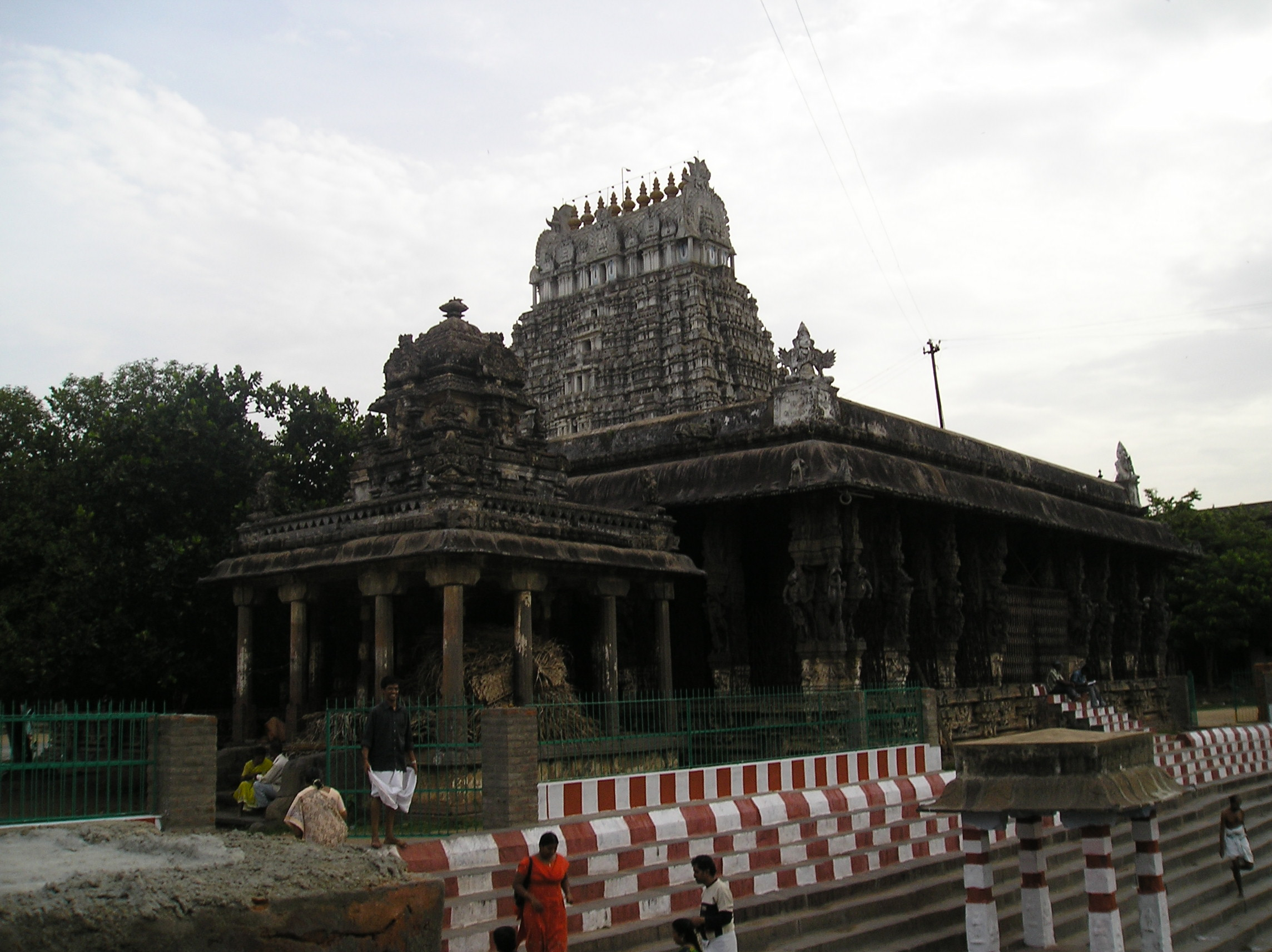
Temple Corridor

Close-up of a warhorse

Carving of cavalry on a pillar in the 100-pillar hall

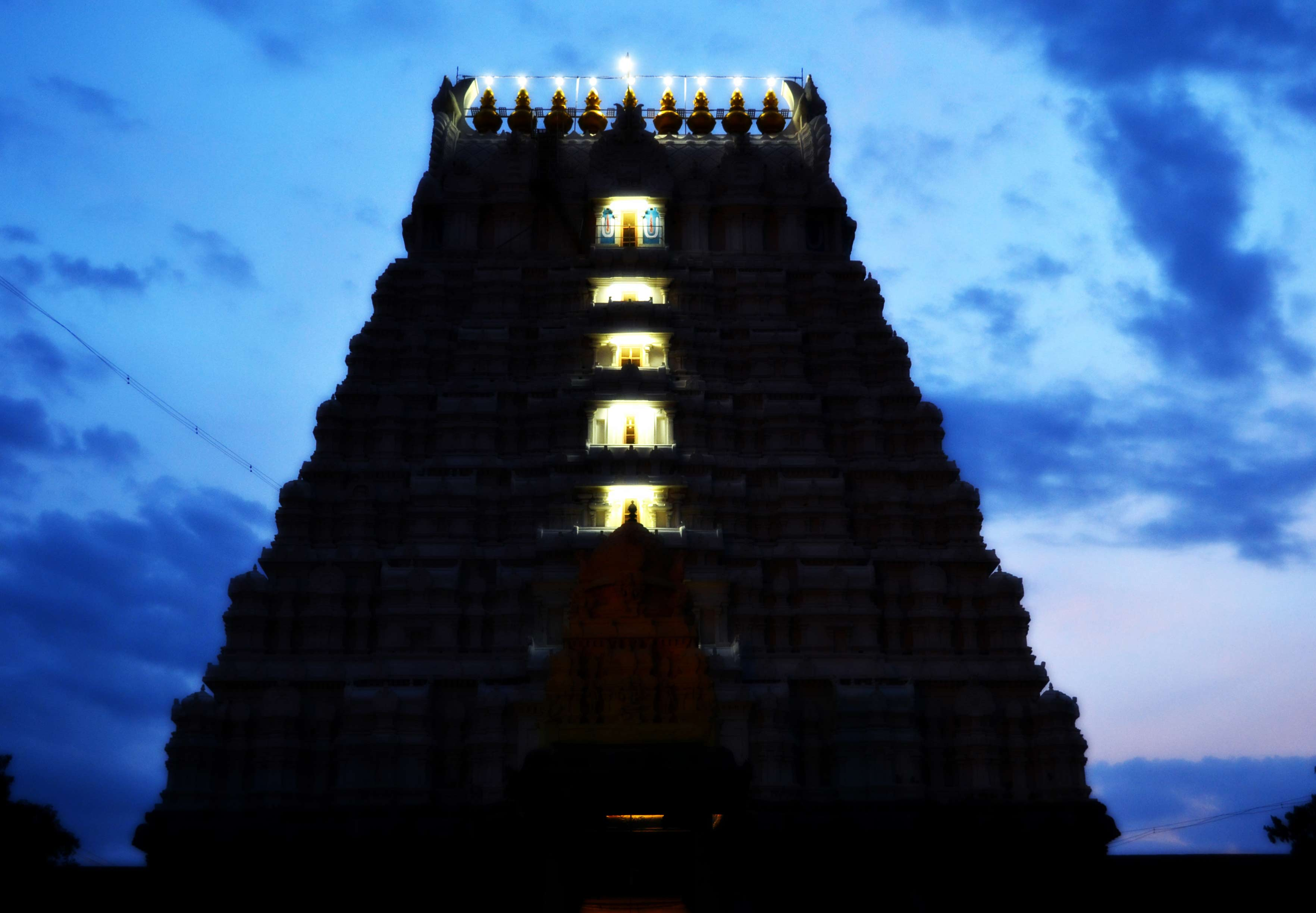
Gopuram View at Night

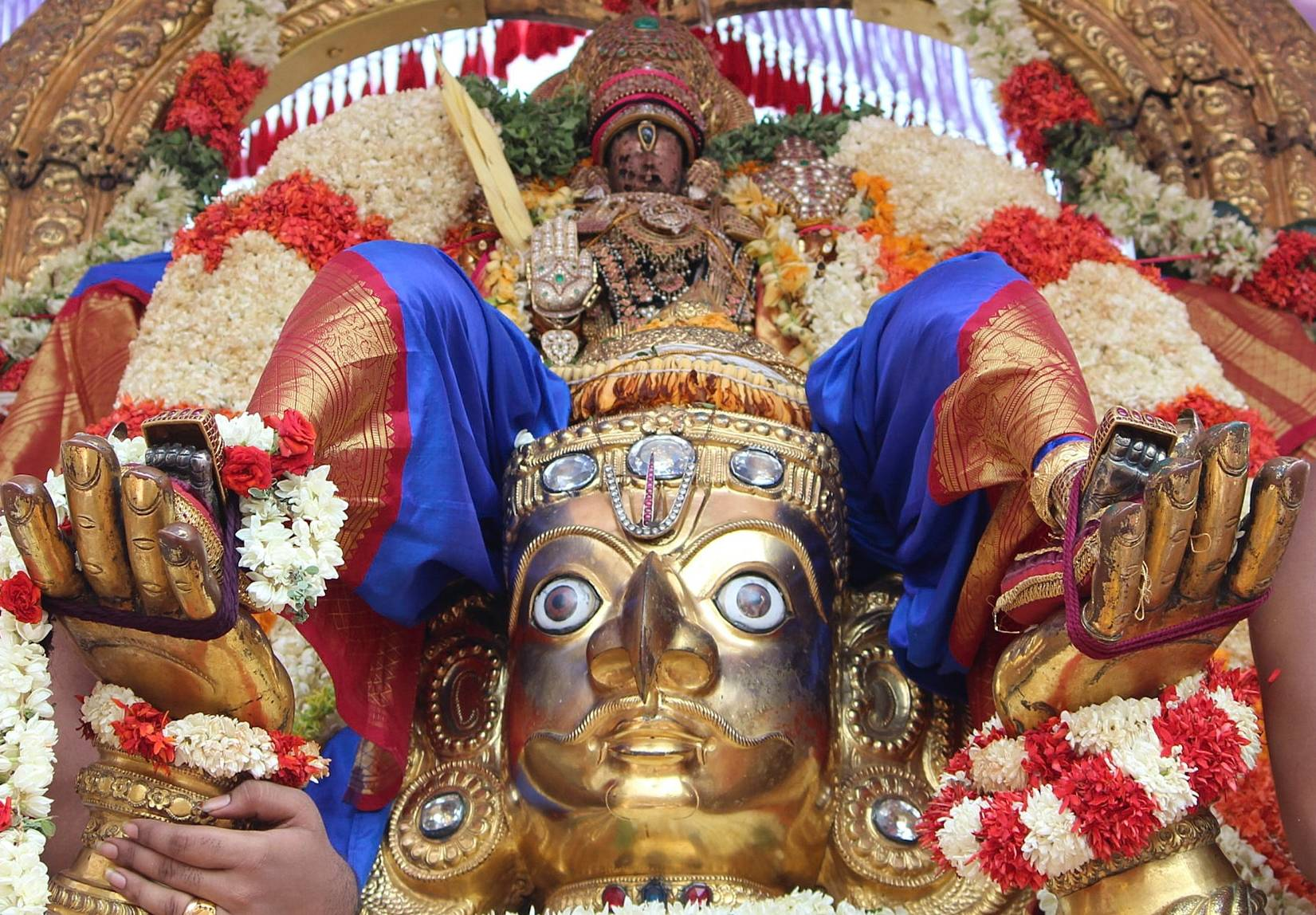
Garuda Sevai of Kanchi Varadaraja Perumal during Annual vaikasi brahmothsavam.
