= Kanchipuram (disambiguation) =

Kanchipuram (also Kancheepuram, Kanchipura and Kanchi; formerly Conjeevaram) is a temple city in the Indian state of Tamil Nadu.

Kanchipuram, Kanchipura, Kancheepuram or Conjeevaram may also refer to:

- Kancheepuram (state assembly constituency), an electoral constituency of the state legislative assembly of Tamil Nadu, India
- Kancheepuram (Lok Sabha constituency), an electoral constituency of the parliament of India
- Kanchipuram district, a district in Tamil Nadu, India with Kanchipuram as its capital
- Kanchipuram division, a revenue division of Tamil Nadu, India
- Kanchipuram taluk, a taluk of Tamil Nadu, India
- Kanchipuram railway station, is a railway station in Kanchipuram, Tamil Nadu, India
- Kanchipuram silk sari, a type of silk sari
- Kancheepuram Natarajan Gandhi (born 1948), Indian botanist
- Conjeevaram N. Annadurai (1909–1969), Indian politician
- Conjeevaram Hayavadana Rao (1865–1946), Indian historian, anthropologist and economist
- Kanchipur, Manipur, a town in Manipur, India
