= Ezhichur =

- Neighbourhood
- Ezhichur, Kanchipuram
- Coordinates: 12.813200°N 79.913000°E
- Country: India
- State: Tamil Nadu
- District: Chennai district
- Elevation: 71 m (233 ft)

Languages
  - Official: Tamil, English
  - Speech: Tamil, English
- Time zone: UTC+5:30 (IST)
- PIN: 631605
- Neighbourhoods: Thollazhi, Chennakuppam, Ullavur, Devariyambakkam and Vadakkuppattu
- LS: Kancheepuram Lok Sabha constituency
- VS: Kancheepuram Assembly constituency
- MP: G. Selvam
- MLA: C. V. M. P. Ezhilarasan
- Website: kancheepuram.nic.in

Ezhichur is a neighbourhood in Kanchipuram district of Tamil Nadu state in the peninsular India. It is located at an altitude of about 71 m above the mean sea level with the geographical coordinates of 12.813200°N 79.913000°E (i.e., 12°48'47.5"N, 79°54'46.8"E). Thollazhi, Chennakuppam, Ullavur, Devariyambakkam and Vadakkuppattu are some of the important neighbourhoods of Ezhichur.

== Access ==
Ezhichur is connected to Tambaram via road and there is only one bus plying between Tambaram and Ezhichur and people demand for more bus services.

== Facilities ==
A Shiva temple viz., Nallinakkeswarar Temple is situated in Ezhichur.

In July 2020, a treatment area for COVID-19 was criticized for lack of infrastructure.

== Politics ==
Ezhichur area falls under the Kancheepuram Assembly constituency. The winner of the election held in the year 2021 as the member of its assembly constituency is C. V. M. P. Ezhilarasan. It is part of Kancheepuram Lok Sabha constituency. G. Selvam won the 2019 elections, as the member of its Lok Sabha constituency.
