= Periyapanicheri =

Village in Tamil Nadu, India

- Village
- Location within Tamil Nadu Location within India
- Coordinates: 13°00′38″N 80°07′57″E
- Country: India
- State: Tamil Nadu
- District: Kanchipuram
- Taluk: Sriperumbudur
- Elevation: 16 m (52 ft)

Population (2011)
  - Total: 2,379

Languages
  - Local: Tamil
- Time zone: UTC+5:30 (IST)
- PIN: 602105

Periyapanicheri is a village in Kanchipuram district, Tamil Nadu, India. It is located on the eastern part of Kancheepuram district, about 25 kilometres east of the taluk seat Sriperumbudur and 68 kilometres northeast of the district seat Kanchipuram. As of the year 2011, it had a population of 2,379.

== Geography ==
Periyapanicheri is situated along the National Highway 32, bordering the villages of Thelliaragaram and Gerugambakkam. It has an average elevation of 16 metres above the sea level.

== Demographics ==
According to the 2011 Census of India, Periyapanicheri had a population of 2,379, of which 1,159 were male and 1,220 were female. The literacy rate was 77.89%, with 960 of the male residents and 893 of the female residents being literate.
