= S. S. Thirunavukkarasu =

Indian politician

Member of the Legislative Assembly, Tamil Nadu
- In office 13 May 2001 – 22 November 2004
- Preceded by: P. Murugesan
- Succeeded by: Mythili Thirunavukkarasu
- Constituency: Kancheepuram

Personal details
- Born: 8 May 1949 Kancheepuram
- Party: All India Anna Dravida Munnetra Kazhagam
- Profession: Advocate

S. S. Thirunavukkarasu is an Indian politician and a former member of the Tamil Nadu Legislative Assembly. He hails from Kanchipuram town in Kanchipuram district.

Thirunavukkarasu, who holds a Bachelor of Arts and a Bachelor of Law degree, belongs to the All India Anna Dravida Munnetra Kazhagam (AIADMK) party. He contested and won the election to the Tamil Nadu Legislative Assembly from the Kancheepuram Assembly constituency in the 1957 election, becoming a Member of the Legislative Assembly. He served as the Minister for Information, Publicity, and Forests from May 19, 2001, to March 1, 2002.

== Electoral performance ==
=== 2001 ===
2001 Tamil Nadu Legislative Assembly election: Kancheepuram
Party	Candidate	Votes	%	±%
AIADMK	S. S. Thirunavukkarasu	84,246	55.81%	23.37%
DMK	Sekar A	60,643	40.17%	−15.73%
MDMK	Valayapathy E	2,479	1.64%	
Independent	Ravi K	1,545	1.02%	
Independent	Mohan K. R.	772	0.51%	
Margin of victory		23,603	15.64%	−7.83%
Turnout		1,50,953	59.96%	−12.32%
Registered electors		2,51,748		
AIADMK gain from DMK		Swing	-0.09%	
