= P. Kamalambal =

Indian politician

Member-Tamil Nadu Legislative Assembly
- In office 2006–2011
- Preceded by: Mythili Thirunavukkarasu
- Succeeded by: V. Somasundaram
- Constituency: Kancheepuram

Personal details
- Born: 25 March 1939 Kancheepuram
- Party: Pattali Makkal Katchi

Perumal Sakthi Kamalambal (born 1939) is an Indian politician from Tamil Nadu. She is a former member of the Assembly representing Pattali Makkal Katchi from Kancheepuram Assembly constituency in Kanchi district.

Kamalambal is from Kanchipuram town, Kanchipuram district. She married S Perumal. She studied up to Class 10 and later did Teacher Training course in 1969.

She contested and won the 2006 Tamil Nadu Legislative Assembly election from the Kanchipuram Assembly constituency on PMK ticket. She defeated her nearest rival T Mythili of the All India Anna Dravida Munnetra Kazhagam (AIADMK). She polled 81,366 votes and won by a margin of 11,284 votes.

== Electoral Performance ==
=== 2006 ===
2006 Tamil Nadu Legislative Assembly election: Kancheepuram
Party	Candidate	Votes	%	±%
PMK	P. Kamalambal	81,366	47.11%	
AIADMK	Mythili Thirunavukkarasu	70,082	40.57%	−15.23%
DMDK	Eagambaram, S	15,187	8.79%	
Independent	Mari, G	2,337	1.35%	
BJP	Raghavan, K. T	1,730	1.00%	
Margin of victory		11,284	6.53%	−9.10%
Turnout		1,72,723	72.21%	12.25%
Registered electors		2,39,201		
PMK gain from AIADMK		Swing	-8.70%	
