= Kanchipuram division =

Indian administrative unit

Kanchipuram division is a revenue division in the Kanchipuram district of Tamil Nadu, India. It comprises the taluks of Kanchipuram, Sriperumbudur and Uthiramerur.
