= K. Maragatham =

Indian politician

- கு. மரகதம்
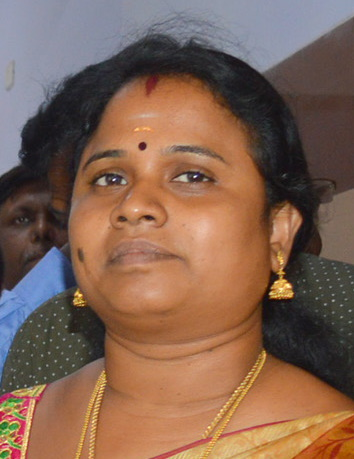

Member of the Tamil Nadu Legislative Assembly
- Incumbent
- Assumed office 12 May 2021
- Preceded by: S. Pugazhenthi
- Constituency: Maduranthakam

Member of Parliament, Lok Sabha
- In office 1 September 2014 – 23 May 2019
- Preceded by: P. Viswanathan
- Succeeded by: G. Selvam
- Constituency: Kancheepuram

Personal details
- Born: 27 December 1982 (age 43) Madipakkam, Kanchipuram, Tamil Nadu
- Party: Tamilaga Vettri Kazhagam (since 25 May 2026)
- Other political affiliations: All India Anna Dravida Munnetra Kazhagam (until 25 May 2026)
- Spouse: Thaiyur S.Kumaravel
- Children: 1
- Education: Tamil Nadu Open University
- Occupation: Businesswoman
- As of 17 December, 2016

Maragatham Kumaravel (born 27 December 1982) is an Indian politician from Tamil Nadu. She is a former Member of Parliament elected from Kancheepuram constituency as an Anna Dravida Munnetra Kazhagam (AIADMK) candidate in 2014 election.

In 2021, she contested from Maduranthakam Assembly constituency on an AIADMK ticket, and won.

She retained the seat for AIADMK in 2026, winning the 2026 Tamil Nadu Legislative Assembly election from Maduranthakam again. She polled 69,284 and defeated her nearest rival, E. Ezhil Catherine of Tamilaga Vettri Kazhagam, by a margin of 7,194 votes.

== Electoral performance ==
=== Assembly Elections ===
2026 Tamil Nadu Legislative Assembly election: Madurantakam
Party	Candidate	Votes	%	±%
AIADMK	Maragatham Kumaravel. K	69,284	32.58	▼14.62
TVK	Ezhil Katharine Ezhilmalai	62,090	29.20	New
DMK	S. Amulu Ponmalar	59,838	28.14	New
NTK	G. Janakiraman	4,950	2.50	▼2.56
NOTA	NOTA	797	0.40	▼0.35
BSP	Neelam E. Ramkumar	374	0.19	New
Independent	Ranjitham. M	357	0.18	New
Margin of victory		7,194	3.63	▲1.69
Turnout		1,98,551	93.36	▲12.36
Registered electors		2,12,666		▼14,019
AIADMK hold		Swing	▼12.25	

2021 Tamil Nadu Legislative Assembly election: Maduranthakam
Party	Candidate	Votes	%	±%
AIADMK	Maragatham Kumaravel. K	86,646	47.20	▲7.43
MDMK	C. E. Sathya	83,076	45.25	▲3.83
NTK	P. Sumitha	9,293	5.06	New
DMDK	N. Moorthi	2,137	1.16	▼5.45
MNM	K. Dinesh	1,488	0.81	New
NOTA	NOTA	1,371	0.75	−0.11
Margin of victory		3,570	1.94	0.28
Turnout		183,576	80.98	−0.30
Rejected ballots		223	0.12	
Registered electors		226,685		
AIADMK gain from DMK		Swing	5.77	

=== General Elections 2019 ===
2019 Indian general election: Kancheepuram
Party	Candidate	Votes	%	±%
DMK	G. Selvam	684,004	55.50	23.76
AIADMK	K. Maragatham	3,97,372	32.24	−12.72
NTK	D. Sivaranjani	62,771	5.09	
Independent	A. Munusamy	55,213	4.48	
NOTA	None Of The Above	21,661	1.76	0.16
Margin of victory		2,86,632	23.26	10.03
Turnout		12,32,417	74.96	−0.07
Registered electors		16,43,992		11.07
DMK gain from AIADMK		Swing	10.54	

=== General Elections 2014 ===
2014 Indian general election: Kancheepuram
Party	Candidate	Votes	%	±%
AIADMK	K. Maragatham	499,395	44.96	4.64
DMK	G. Selvam	3,52,529	31.74	
MDMK	C. E. Sathya	2,07,080	18.64	
INC	P. Viswanathan	33,313	3.00	−38.99
NOTA	None Of The Above	17,736	1.60	
BSP	V. S. Chandirakumar	6,807	0.61	−0.11
Margin of victory		1,46,866	13.22	11.56
Turnout		11,10,663	75.04	0.86
Registered electors		14,80,123		39.61
AIADMK gain from INC		Swing	2.97	
