= Pinayur =

Cullage in Uthiramerur taluk, Tamil Nadu, India

Pinayur is a village located in Uthiramerur taluk, Kanchipuram district, Tamil Nadu, India. The nearest town to Pinayur village is Chengalpattu. This village is a home to 1068 people of which 85% of the people are literate. There are two Hindu temples (Sri Kaleeswarar temple, Sri Brahmeshwarar temple) and a buddhist temple.
