= Nattapettai =

Nasarethpettai Nasarethpettai
- Census town
- Location in Tamil Nadu, India
- Coordinates: 12°49′51″N 79°44′38″E
- Country: India
- State: Tamil Nadu
- District: Kancheepuram

Population (2001)
  - Total: 10,190

Languages
  - Official: Tamil
- Time zone: UTC+5:30 (IST)

Nasarethpettai is a census town in Kancheepuram district in the Indian state of Tamil Nadu.

== Demographics ==
As of 2001 India census, Nasarethpettai had a population of 10,190. Males constitute 51% of the population and females 49%. Nasarethpettai has an average literacy rate of 68%, higher than the national average of 59.5%: male literacy is 75%, and female literacy is 60%. In Nattapettai, 12% of the population is under 6 years of age.
