= Sevilimedu =

- city
- Location in Tamil Nadu, India
- Coordinates: 12°49′09″N 79°41′00″E
- Country: India
- State: Tamil Nadu
- District: Kancheepuram

Population (2011)
  - Total: 23,454

Languages
  - Official: Tamil
- Time zone: UTC+5:30 (IST)

Sevilimedu is a part of kanchipuram city in Tamil Nadu, India.

== Demographics ==
As of 2001 India census, Sevilimedu had a population of 15,918. Males constitute 50% of the population and females 50%. Sevilimedu has an average literacy rate of 73%, higher than the national average of 59.5%: male literacy is 78%, and female literacy is 67%. In Sevilimedu, 10% of the population is under 6 years of age.
