= Kancheepuram Assembly constituency =

State Legislative Assembly Constituency in Tamil Nadu

Coordinates: 12.82°N 79.71°E

Kancheepuram
- Constituency No. 37 for the Tamil Nadu Legislative Assembly

Constituency details
- Country: India
- Region: South India
- State: Tamil Nadu
- District: Kanchipuram
- Lok Sabha constituency: Kancheepuram
- Established: 1951
- Total electors: 2,78,841
- Reservation: None

Member of Legislative Assembly
- 17th Tamil Nadu Legislative Assembly
- Incumbent R. V. Ranjithkumar
- Party: TVK
- Elected year: 2026

Kancheepuram is a state assembly constituency in Kancheepuram district, Tamil Nadu, India. Its State Assembly Constituency number is 37. It comprises a portion of Kanchipuram taluk and is a part of the similarly named constituency that is used for national elections to the Parliament of India. It is one of the 234 State Legislative Assembly Constituencies in Tamil Nadu, in India.

== Members of Legislative Assembly ==
=== Madras State ===
Year	Winner	Party
1952	Deivasigamani	Kisan Mazdoor Praja Party
1957	C. N. Annadurai	Dravida Munnetra Kazhagam
1962	S. V. Natesa Mudaliar	Indian National Congress
1967	N. Krishnan	Dravida Munnetra Kazhagam

=== Tamil Nadu ===
Year	Winner	Party
1971	C. V. M. Annamalai	Dravida Munnetra Kazhagam
1977	K. Balaji	All India Anna Dravida Munnetra Kazhagam
1980	P. Venkatasubramanian	All India Anna Dravida Munnetra Kazhagam
1984	K. Balaji	All India Anna Dravida Munnetra Kazhagam
1989	P. Murugesan	Dravida Munnetra Kazhagam
1991	C. P. Pattabiraman	All India Anna Dravida Munnetra Kazhagam
1996	P. Murugesan	Dravida Munnetra Kazhagam
2001	S. S. Thirunavukkarasu	All India Anna Dravida Munnetra Kazhagam
2005 by-election	Mythili Thirunavukkarasu	All India Anna Dravida Munnetra Kazhagam
2006	P. Kamalambal	Pattali Makkal Katchi
2011	V. Somasundaram	All India Anna Dravida Munnetra Kazhagam
2016	C. V. M. P. Ezhilarasan	Dravida Munnetra Kazhagam
2021	C. V. M. P. Ezhilarasan	Dravida Munnetra Kazhagam
2026	R. V. Ranjithkumar	Tamilaga Vettri Kazhagam

== Election results ==
Vote share of winning candidates
2026	37.09%
2021	44.77%
2016	40.40%
2011	53.43%
2006	47.11%
2001	55.81%
1996	55.90%
1991	56.03%
1989	47.66%
1984	55.31%
1980	48.25%
1977	35.47%
1971	52.52%
1967	56.78%
1962	54.80%
1957	51.94%
1952	41.83%

=== 2026 ===
2026 Tamil Nadu Legislative Assembly election: Kancheepuram
Party	Candidate	Votes	%	±%
TVK	R. V. Ranjithkumar	91,350	37.09	New
AIADMK	V. Somasundaram	75,862	30.80	New
DMK	Nithya Sugumar	69,344	28.15	▼16.62
NTK	Vetriselvi	6,950	2.82	▼3.26
NOTA	NOTA	1,078	0.44	▼0.66
Independent	G. Babu	364	0.15	New
Independent	M. Meganathan	286	0.12	New
ACDP	M. Nandhakumar	217	0.09	New
Independent	E. Dhakshnamoorthy	178	0.07	New
TVK	V. Naresh	178	0.07	New
Independent	M. Balaji	138	0.06	New
All India Puratchi Thalaivar Makkal Munnetra Kazhagam	P. Venkatesan	110	0.04	New
Independent	V. Somasundaram	78	0.03	New
Independent	Gnanamoorthy	74	0.03	New
Independent	M. Somasundaram	68	0.03	New
Independent	C. Dillibabu	42	0.02	New
Margin of victory		15,488	6.29	▲1.24
Turnout		2,46,317	88.34	▲14.12
Registered electors		2,78,841		▼30,276
TVK gain from DMK		Swing	▲37.09	

=== 2021 ===
2021 Tamil Nadu Legislative Assembly election: Kancheepuram
Party	Candidate	Votes	%	±%
DMK	C. V. M. P. Ezhilarasan	102,712	44.77%	4.37%
PMK	P. Magesh Kumar	91,117	39.71%	
NTK	S. Saldin	13,946	6.08%	5.29%
MNM	B. Gopinath	12,028	5.24%	
NOTA	Nota	2,534	1.10%	−0.52%
AMMK	N. Manogaran	2,301	1.00%	
Independent	L. Arulnathan	2,055	0.90%	
BSP	K. Prabakaran	1,193	0.52%	0.23%
Margin of victory		11,595	5.05%	1.69%
Turnout		2,29,430	74.22%	−1.26%
Rejected ballots		385	0.17%	
Registered electors		3,09,117		
DMK hold		Swing	4.37%	

=== 2016 ===
2016 Tamil Nadu Legislative Assembly election: Kancheepuram
Party	Candidate	Votes	%	±%
DMK	C. V. M. P. Ezhilarasan	90,533	40.40%	
AIADMK	T. Mythili	82,985	37.03%	−16.40%
PMK	P. Magesh Kumar	30,102	13.43%	
DMDK	S. Eagambaram	8,986	4.01%	
BJP	T. Vasan	3,646	1.63%	0.36%
NOTA	None Of The Above	3,645	1.63%	
NTK	M. Usha	1,758	0.78%	
Margin of victory		7,548	3.37%	−10.01%
Turnout		2,24,112	75.49%	−5.34%
Registered electors		2,96,893		
DMK gain from AIADMK		Swing	-13.03%	

2011 Tamil Nadu Legislative Assembly election: Kancheepuram
Party	Candidate	Votes	%	±%
AIADMK	V. Somasundaram	102,710	53.43%	12.85%
PMK	P. S. Ulagarakshagan	76,993	40.05%	
	A. N. Radhakrishnan	2,806	1.46%	
BJP	M. Perumal	2,441	1.27%	0.27%
	Ta. V. Passamighu Annan Venkatesanor	1,623	0.84%	
Independent	E. Raja	1,417	0.74%	
IJK	S. M. Subramanian	1,201	0.62%	
Margin of victory		25,717	13.38%	6.84%
Turnout		2,37,837	80.83%	8.62%
Registered electors		1,92,235		
AIADMK gain from PMK		Swing	6.32%	

=== 2006 ===
2006 Tamil Nadu Legislative Assembly election: Kancheepuram
Party	Candidate	Votes	%	±%
PMK	P. Kamalambal	81,366	47.11%	
AIADMK	Mythili Thirunavukkarasu	70,082	40.57%	−15.23%
DMDK	Eagambaram, S	15,187	8.79%	
Independent	Mari, G	2,337	1.35%	
BJP	Raghavan, K. T	1,730	1.00%	
Margin of victory		11,284	6.53%	−9.10%
Turnout		1,72,723	72.21%	12.25%
Registered electors		2,39,201		
PMK gain from AIADMK		Swing	-8.70%	

=== 2001 ===
2001 Tamil Nadu Legislative Assembly election: Kancheepuram
Party	Candidate	Votes	%	±%
AIADMK	S. S. Thirunavukkarasu	84,246	55.81%	23.37%
DMK	Sekar A	60,643	40.17%	−15.73%
MDMK	Valayapathy E	2,479	1.64%	
Independent	Ravi K	1,545	1.02%	
Independent	Mohan K. R.	772	0.51%	
Margin of victory		23,603	15.64%	−7.83%
Turnout		1,50,953	59.96%	−12.32%
Registered electors		2,51,748		
AIADMK gain from DMK		Swing	-0.09%	

=== 1996 ===
1996 Tamil Nadu Legislative Assembly election: Kancheepuram
Party	Candidate	Votes	%	±%
DMK	P. Murugesan	77,723	55.90%	22.87%
AIADMK	S. S. Thirunavukkarasu	45,094	32.43%	−23.59%
PMK	S. Elumalai	7,643	5.50%	
CPI(M)	Y. M. Narayanasamy	5,683	4.09%	
BJP	M. Govindaraj	1,017	0.73%	0.08%
Margin of victory		32,629	23.47%	0.47%
Turnout		1,39,031	72.29%	4.45%
Registered electors		1,98,315		
DMK gain from AIADMK		Swing	-0.12%	

=== 1991 ===
1991 Tamil Nadu Legislative Assembly election: Kancheepuram
Party	Candidate	Votes	%	±%
AIADMK	C. P. Pattabiraman	66,429	56.03%	27.33%
DMK	P. Murugesan	39,163	33.03%	−14.63%
PMK	Chakkaravarthi Nayagar G.	10,360	8.74%	
JP	Gevarchand A.	828	0.70%	
Margin of victory		27,266	23.00%	4.04%
Turnout		1,18,566	67.83%	−4.50%
Registered electors		1,78,367		
AIADMK gain from DMK		Swing	8.37%	

=== 1989 ===
1989 Tamil Nadu Legislative Assembly election: Kancheepuram
Party	Candidate	Votes	%	±%
DMK	P. Murugesan	53,821	47.66%	4.26%
AIADMK	S. S. Thirunavukkarasu	32,408	28.70%	−26.61%
INC	Narayanaswamy. V.	17,084	15.13%	
AIADMK	Balaji. K.	6,643	5.88%	−49.43%
Independent	Amirthalingam. M. K.	1,666	1.48%	
Margin of victory		21,413	18.96%	7.05%
Turnout		1,12,932	72.33%	−7.86%
Registered electors		1,59,038		
DMK gain from AIADMK		Swing	-7.65%	

=== 1984 ===
1984 Tamil Nadu Legislative Assembly election: Kancheepuram
Party	Candidate	Votes	%	±%
AIADMK	K. Balaji	60,363	55.31%	7.06%
DMK	Palani Raja Kumar. C. M.	47,362	43.40%	−2.56%
Margin of victory		13,001	11.91%	9.62%
Turnout		1,09,137	80.19%	6.24%
Registered electors		1,39,497		
AIADMK hold		Swing	7.06%	

=== 1980 ===
1980 Tamil Nadu Legislative Assembly election: Kancheepuram
Party	Candidate	Votes	%	±%
AIADMK	P. Venkatasubramanian	46,051	48.25%	12.78%
DMK	Sambandan. V	43,859	45.95%	12.68%
JP	Chandrakumar. K	4,350	4.56%	
Independent	Anandan. J	519	0.54%	
Independent	Ranganathan. M	437	0.46%	
Margin of victory		2,192	2.30%	0.09%
Turnout		95,445	73.95%	1.54%
Registered electors		1,30,410		
AIADMK hold		Swing	12.78%	

=== 1977 ===
1977 Tamil Nadu Legislative Assembly election: Kancheepuram
Party	Candidate	Votes	%	±%
AIADMK	K. Balaji	31,327	35.47%	
DMK	V. Sambandan	29,380	33.27%	−19.25%
JP	E. Narendran	16,623	18.82%	
INC	C.R. Umapathy	8,346	9.45%	−35.53%
Independent	N. Krishnan	2,153	2.44%	
Margin of victory		1,947	2.20%	−5.33%
Turnout		88,312	72.41%	−7.17%
Registered electors		1,23,336		
AIADMK gain from DMK		Swing	-17.04%	

=== 1971 ===
1971 Tamil Nadu Legislative Assembly election: Kancheepuram
Party	Candidate	Votes	%	±%
DMK	C. V. M. Annamalai	44,009	52.52%	−4.27%
INC	D. V. Natesa Mudaliar	37,697	44.98%	2.69%
CPI(M)	K. S. Partthasarthy	2,094	2.50%	
Margin of victory		6,312	7.53%	−6.96%
Turnout		83,800	79.58%	−4.41%
Registered electors		1,07,911		
DMK hold		Swing	-4.27%	

=== 1967 ===
1967 Madras Legislative Assembly election: Kancheepuram
Party	Candidate	Votes	%	±%
DMK	N. Krishnan	45,266	56.78%	12.93%
INC	V. C. S. Nayagar	33,716	42.30%	−12.50%
ABJS	C. Jeevarathinam	733	0.92%	
Margin of victory		11,550	14.49%	3.55%
Turnout		79,715	83.99%	−4.17%
Registered electors		97,322		
DMK gain from INC		Swing	1.98%	

=== 1962 ===
1962 Madras Legislative Assembly election: 1962 Madras Legislative Assembly election : Kancheepuram
Party	Candidate	Votes	%	±%
INC	S. V. Natesa Mudaliar	46,018	54.80%	21.03%
DMK	C. N. Annadurai	36,828	43.86%	
Independent	M. K. Parasuram Naicker	1,128	1.34%	
Margin of victory		9,190	10.94%	−7.22%
Turnout		83,974	88.16%	20.77%
Registered electors		98,287		
INC gain from Independent		Swing	2.86%	

=== 1957 ===
1957 Madras Legislative Assembly election: 1957 Madras Legislative Assembly election : Kancheepuram
Party	Candidate	Votes	%	±%
Independent	C. N. Annadurai	31,861	51.94%	
INC	P. S. Srinivasan	20,718	33.77%	2.73%
CPI	K. S. Parthasarathi	6,742	10.99%	
Independent	Chakravarthi Nayagar	1,448	2.36%	
Independent	G. Veradarajan	576	0.94%	
Margin of victory		11,143	18.16%	7.37%
Turnout		61,345	67.39%	7.90%
Registered electors		91,027		
Independent gain from KMPP		Swing	10.10%	

=== 1952 ===
1952 Madras Legislative Assembly election: Kancheepuram
Party	Candidate	Votes	%	±%
KMPP	Deivasigamani	17,543	41.83%	
INC	P. S. Srinivasan	13,016	31.04%	31.04%
Independent	A. Kuppuswami	3,558	8.48%	
CPI	K. S. Parthasarathy	3,410	8.13%	
Commonweal Party	Kalyanasundaram	2,128	5.07%	
Socialist Party (India)	G. K. Kannan	1,987	4.74%	
Margin of victory		4,527	10.80%	
Turnout		41,935	59.49%	
Registered electors		70,489		
KMPP win (new seat)				

== Demographics ==
Demographics (2016)
Category	Data
Created	2016
Sengunthar Kaikola Mudaliyar	30%
Vanniyar	30%
Adi Dravida	20%
Others	20%
Total Electorate	2,96,893
