= Walajabad block =

Coordinates: 12.7969°N 79.8176°E

The Walajabad block is a revenue block in the Kanchipuram district of Tamil Nadu, India. It has a total of 61 panchayat villages.
