= Kammavarpalayam =

Kammavarpalayam is a village in Kanchipuram District of Tamil Nadu, India. It has a population of 400, most of whom are farmers and others are settled in nearby Kanchipuram and Chennai. This village has Three temples "kodhanda Ramar Temple", "Vinayak Temple" and "Guru Bhagavan Temple". Worshipping the "Guru Bhagavan" in Thursdays is very good. And near by Padunelli Village has an Ancient Shiva temple and its main deity called Nellieshwarar. This was the very oldest temple and ruined. It was built around 3000–9000 years ago. Now local people has started doing regular poojas. To visit this temple by bus, get down at Kammavarpalayam village on Kanchipuram to Thirupathy Highway, to visit by train get down at Thirumalpur railway station. To reach Thirumalpur Trains are there from Kanchipuram, Chennai beach and Chengalpat Junction.
