= Kunnattur block =

Revenue block in Kanchipuram district, Tamil Nadu, India

The Kunnattur block is a revenue block in the Kanchipuram district of Tamil Nadu, India. It has a total of 44 panchayat villages.
