= Thenambakkam =

Coordinates: 12°48′36″N 79°44′20″E

- census town
- Interactive map of Thenambakkam
- Country: India
- State: Tamil Nadu
- District: Kancheepuram

Population (2001)
  - Total: 9,257

Languages
  - Official: Tamil
- Time zone: UTC+5:30 (IST)

Thenambakkam is a census town in Kancheepuram district in the Indian state of Tamil Nadu.

Thenambakkam old name Thenmaraiur.

== Demographics ==
As of 2001 India census, Thenambakkam had a population of 9257. Males constitute 51% of the population and females 49%. Thenambakkam has an average literacy rate of 65%, higher than the national average of 59.5%: male literacy is 73%, and female literacy is 57%. In Thenambakkam, 11% of the population is under 6 years of age. Thenambakkam Brahma pureeswarar temple was a favorite place of Kanchi Periyavaal (Pujyasri Chandrasekharendra Saraswathi ) of the famed Kanchi Kamakoti Peetam.
