= Kanchipuram block =

Coordinates: 12.82°N 79.71°E

The Kanchipuram block is a revenue block in the Kanchipuram district of Tamil Nadu, India. It has a total of 43 panchayat villages.
