= Sriperumbudur block =

The Sriperumbudur block is a revenue block in the Kanchipuram district of Tamil Nadu, India. It has a total of 58 panchayat villages.
