= Uttiramerur block =

Coordinates: 12.616°N 79.753°E

The Uttiramerur block is a revenue block in the Kanchipuram district of Tamil Nadu, India. It has a total of 73 panchayat villages.
