= S. V. Natesa Mudaliar =

Indian politician

Member of the Madras State Assembly
- In office 1962–1967
- Preceded by: C. N. Annadurai
- Constituency: Kancheepuram

Personal details
- Party: Indian National Congress

S. V. Natesa Mudaliar was an Indian politician and former Member of the Legislative Assembly of Tamil Nadu. He was elected to the Tamil Nadu legislative assembly as an Indian National Congress candidate from Kancheepuram constituency in 1962 election by defeating former Chief Minister C. N. Annadurai.
