= P. Murugesan =

Indian politician

P. Murugesan was elected to the Tamil Nadu Legislative Assembly from the Kancheepuram constituency in the 1996 elections. He was a candidate of the Dravida Munnetra Kazhagam (DMK) party.
