= G. Selvam =

Indian politician

Member of Parliament, Lok Sabha
- Incumbent
- Assumed office 23 May 2019
- Preceded by: K. Maragatham
- Constituency: Kancheepuram

Personal details
- Born: 18 June 1974 (age 51) Kancheepuram, Tamil Nadu
- Party: DMK
- Spouse: S. Sakila
- Parent: Ganesan (father)
- Profession: Agriculture, Advocate, politician

Ganesan Selvam (Tamil: க. செல்வம்) is an Indian politician. He was elected to the Lok Sabha, lower house of the Parliament of India from Kancheepuram, Tamil Nadu in the 2019 Indian general election as member of the Dravida Munnetra Kazhagam.

== Family and Education ==
He completed his Master of Commerce in Pachaiyappa's College for Men, Kanchipuram in 2000. He received M.Phil in Alagappa University in 2013. He and his wife S. Sakila has 3 children's.

== 2019 Loksabha ==
He contested in 2019 Loksabha election from Kancheepuram constituency and won with margin of 2,86,632 votes then Anna Dravida Munnetra Kazhagam candidate Maragatham K.
