= Uthiramerur taluk =

Human settlement in India

Coordinates: 12.616°N 79.753°E

Uthiramerur Taluk is a taluk in Kanchipuram district of the Indian state of Tamil Nadu. The headquarters of the taluk is the town of Uthiramerur.

== Demographics ==
According to the 2011 census, the taluk of Uthiramerur had a population of 145,376 with 72,828 males and 72,548 females. There were 996 women for every 1000 men. The taluk had a literacy rate of 67.75. Child population in the age group below 6 was 7,537 Males and 7,144 Females.

== See also ==
- Pinayur
