= Kancheepuram Lok Sabha constituency =

Parliamentary constituency in Tamil Nadu, India

Coordinates: 12.82°N 79.71°E

Kancheepuram
- Lok Sabha constituency
- Interactive map of Kancheepuram Loksabha constituency

Constituency details
- Country: India
- Region: South India
- State: Tamil Nadu
- Assembly constituencies: Chengalpattu; Thiruporur; Cheyyur; Madurantakam; Uthiramerur; Kancheepuram
- Established: 1951; 2009
- Total electors: 18,12,565
- Reservation: SC

Member of Parliament
- 18th Lok Sabha
- Incumbent G. Selvam
- Party: DMK
- Alliance: None
- Elected year: 2024

Kancheepuram is a newly formed Lok Sabha (Parliament of India) constituency after the 2008 delimitation. Its Tamil Nadu Parliamentary Constituency number is 6 of 39.

The constituency originally existed for the 1951 election.

This constituency is reserved for Scheduled Castes (SC) candidates.

== Assembly segments ==
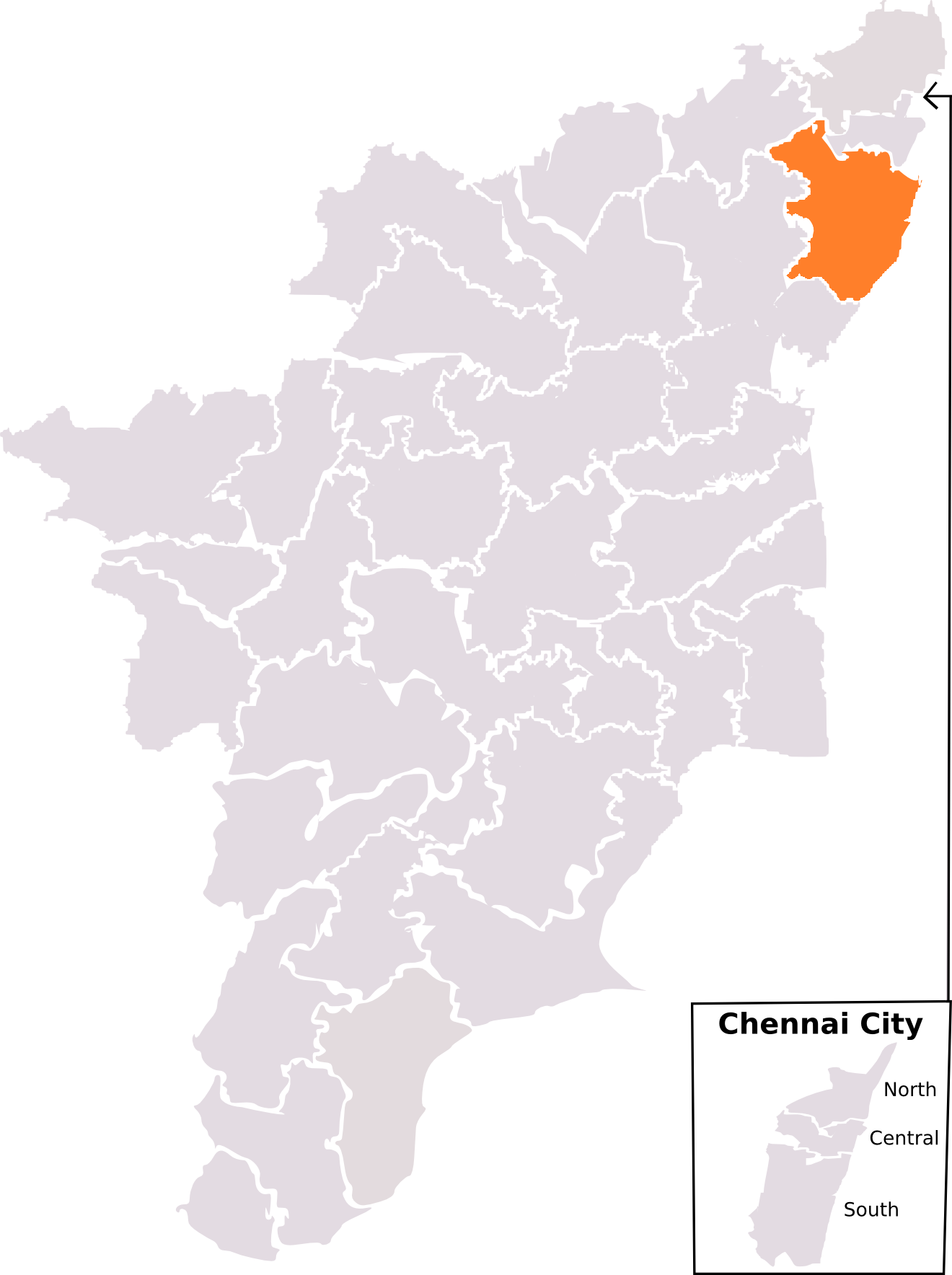
Kancheepuram constituency as laid out by 2008 Delimitation

The constituency in 2008 was formed of 6 assembly segments as follows:

Constituency number	Name	Reserved for (SC/ST/None)	District	Party	2024 Lead
32	Chengalpattu	None	Chengalpattu	TVK	DMK
33	Thiruporur	None	Chengalpattu	TVK	DMK
34	Cheyyur	SC	Chengalpattu	AIADMK	DMK
35	Madurantakam	SC	Chengalpattu	TVK	DMK
36	Uthiramerur	None	Kancheepuram	TVK	DMK
37	Kancheepuram	None	Kancheepuram	TVK	DMK

== Members of Parliament ==
Year	Winner	Party	Runner-up	Party
1951	A. Krishnaswamy	Commonweal Party	T. Chengalvarayan	Indian National Congress
2009	P. Viswanathan	Indian National Congress	E. Ramakrishnan	All India Anna Dravida Munnetra Kazhagam
2014	K. Maragatham	All India Anna Dravida Munnetra Kazhagam	G. Selvam	Dravida Munnetra Kazhagam
2019	G. Selvam	Dravida Munnetra Kazhagam	K. Maragatham	All India Anna Dravida Munnetra Kazhagam
2024	G. Selvam	Dravida Munnetra Kazhagam	E. Rajashekar	All India Anna Dravida Munnetra Kazhagam

== Election results ==
Vote share of Winning candidates
2024	46.53%
2019	55.50%
2014	44.96%
2009	41.99%
1951	55.63%

=== General Elections 2024 ===
2024 Indian general election: Kancheepuram
Party	Candidate	Votes	%	±%
DMK	G. Selvam	586,044	46.53	▼8.97
AIADMK	E. Rajasekhar	3,64,571	28.94	▼4.30
PMK	V. Jothi	1,64,931	13.09	
NOTA	None of the above	16,965	1.35	▼0.41
Margin of victory		221,473	17.83	▼5.43
Turnout		1,259,578	71.68	▼3.28
Registered electors		17,48,866		
DMK hold		Swing		

=== General Elections 2019 ===
2019 Indian general election: Kancheepuram
Party	Candidate	Votes	%	±%
DMK	G. Selvam	684,004	55.50	23.76
AIADMK	K. Maragatham	3,97,372	32.24	−12.72
Independent	A. Munusamy	55,213	4.48	
NOTA	None Of The Above	21,661	1.76	0.16
Margin of victory		2,86,632	23.26	10.03
Turnout		12,32,417	74.96	−0.07
Registered electors		16,43,992		11.07
DMK gain from AIADMK		Swing	10.54	

=== General Elections 2014 ===
2014 Indian general election: Kancheepuram
Party	Candidate	Votes	%	±%
AIADMK	K. Maragatham	499,395	44.96	4.64
DMK	G. Selvam	3,52,529	31.74	
MDMK	C. E. Sathya	2,07,080	18.64	
INC	P. Viswanathan	33,313	3.00	−38.99
NOTA	None Of The Above	17,736	1.60	
BSP	V. S. Chandirakumar	6,807	0.61	−0.11
Margin of victory		1,46,866	13.22	11.56
Turnout		11,10,663	75.04	0.86
Registered electors		14,80,123		39.61
AIADMK gain from INC		Swing	2.97	

=== General Elections 2009 ===
2009 Indian general election: Kancheepuram
Party	Candidate	Votes	%	±%
INC	P. Viswanathan	330,237	41.99	
AIADMK	Dr. E. Ramakrishnan	3,17,134	40.32	
DMDK	T. Tamilvendan	1,03,560	13.17	
BSP	K. Uthrapathi	5,663	0.72	
Independent	C. A. Balakrishnan	5,161	0.66	
Margin of victory		13,103	1.67	
Turnout		10,60,188	74.18	
Rejected ballots		193	0.02	
INC win (new seat)				

=== General Elections 1951 ===
1951–52 Indian general election: Kancheepuram
Party	Candidate	Votes	%	±%
Commonweal Party	A. Krishnaswami	111,233	55.63	
INC	T. Chengalvarayan	88,724	44.37	44.37
Margin of victory		22,509	11.26	
Turnout		1,99,957	60.08	
Registered electors		3,32,827		0.00
Commonweal Party win (new seat)				
