= C. V. M. P. Ezhilarasan =

Indian politician

- சி வி எம் பி எழிலரசன்

Member of Tamil Nadu Legislative Assembly
- Incumbent
- Assumed office 19 May 2016
- Constituency: Kanchipuram

Propaganda Secretary of DMK
- Incumbent
- Assumed office 14 March 2025 Serving with Tiruchi Siva and 16 others
- President: MK Stalin

Secretary of DMK Manavar Ani
- In office 2016 – March 2025
- President: Kalaignar Karunanidhi (2016-18); MK Stalin (2018-present)

Member of TN Legislative Committee on Estimates
- Incumbent
- Assumed office 16 July 2021

Personal details
- Born: 21 June 1971 (age 54)
- Party: Dravida Munnetra Kazhagam
- Spouse: Kalai
- Children: 2

C. V. M. P. Ezhilarasan (in Tamil: சி. வி. எம். பி. எழிலரசன்) is an Indian politician and Member of the Tamil Nadu Legislative Assembly. He contested the 2016 and 2021 Tamil Nadu Assembly elections from Kanchipuram constituency as a candidate of the Dravida Munnetra Kazhagam and was elected to the Tamil Nadu Legislative Assembly. He is well known friend to Udhayanidhi Stalin who is the current Youth Wing secretary of DMK party and Member of Legislative Assembly from Chepauk-Triplicane constituency. It is a friendship between two families that spans decades. Beginning with the grandfathers C. V. M. Annamalai and M. Karunanidhi; then the fathers C. V. M. A. Ponmozhi and MK Stalin; And now the sons C. V. M. P. Ezhilarasan and Udhayanithi Stalin-the bond they share for three generations is widely known in the political circle.

== Electoral performance ==
=== 2021 ===
2021 Tamil Nadu Legislative Assembly election: Kancheepuram
Party	Candidate	Votes	%	±%
DMK	C. V. M. P. Ezhilarasan	102,712	44.77%	4.37%
PMK	P. Magesh Kumar	91,117	39.71%	
NTK	S. Saldin	13,946	6.08%	5.29%
MNM	B. Gopinath	12,028	5.24%	
NOTA	Nota	2,534	1.10%	−0.52%
AMMK	N. Manogaran	2,301	1.00%	
Independent	L. Arulnathan	2,055	0.90%	
BSP	K. Prabakaran	1,193	0.52%	0.23%
Margin of victory		11,595	5.05%	1.69%
Turnout		2,29,430	74.22%	−1.26%
Rejected ballots		385	0.17%	
Registered electors		3,09,117		
DMK hold		Swing	4.37%	

=== 2016 ===
2016 Tamil Nadu Legislative Assembly election: Kancheepuram
Party	Candidate	Votes	%	±%
DMK	C. V. M. P. Ezhilarasan	90,533	40.40%	
AIADMK	T. Mythili	82,985	37.03%	−16.40%
PMK	P. Magesh Kumar	30,102	13.43%	
DMDK	S. Eagambaram	8,986	4.01%	
BJP	T. Vasan	3,646	1.63%	0.36%
NOTA	None Of The Above	3,645	1.63%	
NTK	M. Usha	1,758	0.78%	
Margin of victory		7,548	3.37%	−10.01%
Turnout		2,24,112	75.49%	−5.34%
Registered electors		2,96,893		
DMK gain from AIADMK		Swing	-13.03%	
