= Sriperumbudur taluk =

Taluk of Kanchipuram district of the Indian state of Tamil Nadu

Sriperumbudur
- Taluk
- Sriperumbudur

Area
  - Total: 247.72 km^{2} (95.65 sq mi)

Population (2011)
  - Total: 154,686
  - Density: 624.44/km^{2} (1,617.3/sq mi)

Sriperumbudur taluk is a taluk of Kanchipuram district of the Indian state of Tamil Nadu. The headquarters of the taluk is the town of Sriperumbudur.
