= Kanchipuram taluk =

Taluk of Kancheepuram district of the Indian state of Tamil Nadu

Coordinates: 12.82°N 79.71°E

Kancheepuram
- Taluk
- Kancheepuram
- Interactive map of Kancheepuram

Area
  - Total: 399.53 km^{2} (154.26 sq mi)

Population (2011)
  - Total: 464,885
  - Density: 1,163.6/km^{2} (3,013.7/sq mi)

Kancheepuram taluk is a taluk of Kancheepuram district of the Indian state of Tamil Nadu. The headquarters of the taluk is the town of Kanchipuram.
