= Kanchipuram =

Municipal Corporation in Tamil Nadu, India

- City
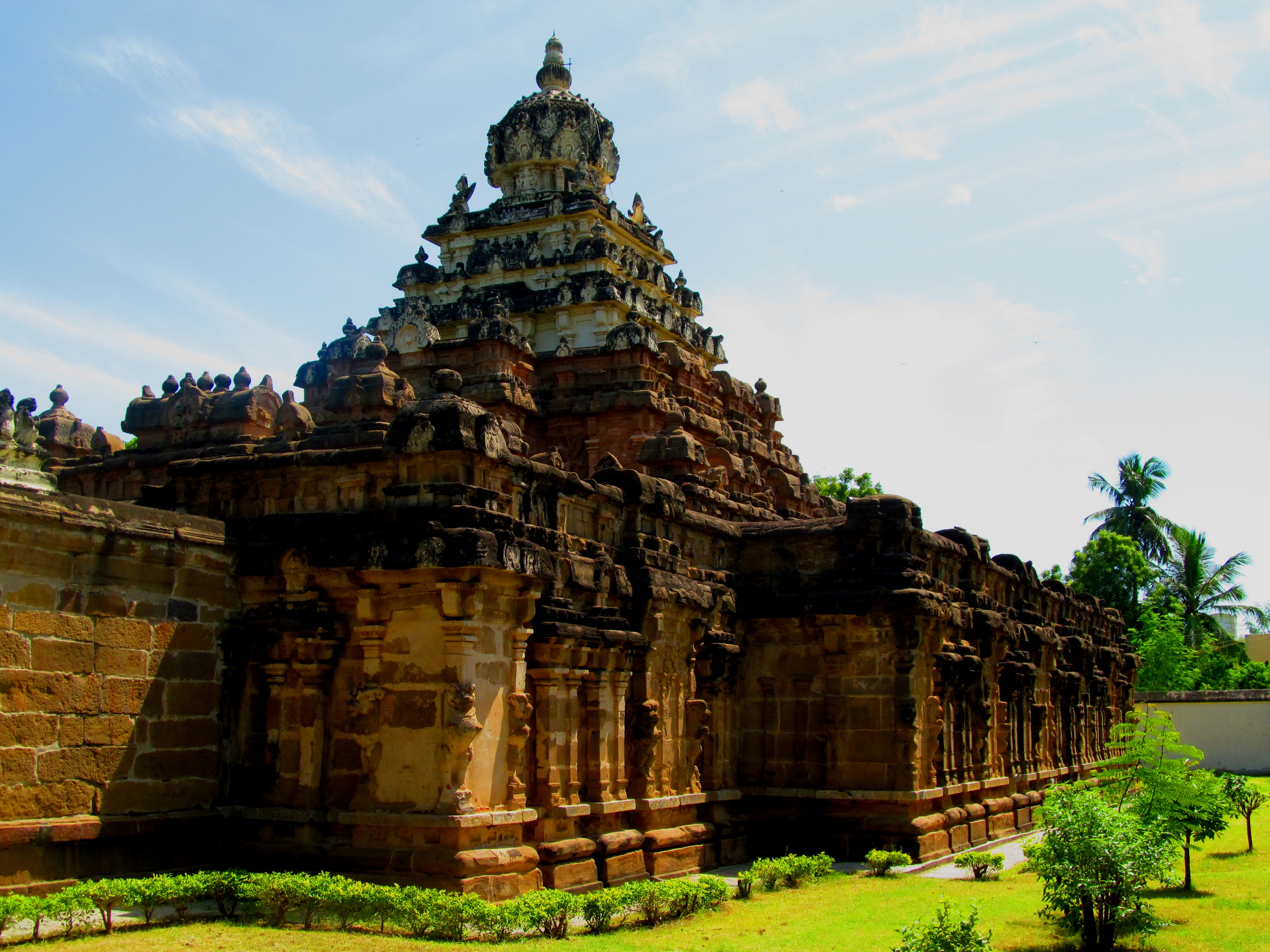
- Vaikunta Perumal Temple, (731 CE–796 CE), one of the oldest temples in the city
- Nicknames: Spiritual Capital of Tamil Nadu, City of Thousand Temples, Silk City, Temple City, Capital of Pallava Nadu
- Kanchipuram, Tamil Nadu Kanchipuram (India)
- Coordinates: 12°49′55.219″N 79°42′13.17″E
- Country: India
- State: Tamil Nadu
- Region: Tondai Nadu
- District: Kanchipuram
- Metro: Chennai Metropolitan Area
- Established: 300 BCE

Government
  - Type: Mayor-Council
  - Body: Kanchipuram Municipal Corporation
  - Mayor: M. Mahalakshmi (DMK)
  - Corporation Commissioner: G. Kannan I.A.S
  - Member of legislative assembly: R. V. Ranjithkumar
  - Member of Parliament: G.Selvam

Area
  - Total: 36.14 km^{2} (13.95 sq mi)
  - Rank: 15
- Elevation: 105 m (344 ft)

Population (2011)
  - Total: 232,816
  - Rank: 15
  - Density: 6,442/km^{2} (16,680/sq mi)
- Demonym: kanchipuramites

Languages
  - Official: Tamil
- Time zone: UTC+5:30 (IST)
- PIN: 631501-631503
- Telephone code: 044
- Vehicle registration: TN-21
- Nominal GDP(2023-24): ₹14,425 crore (equivalent to ₹160 billion or US$1.7 billion in 2026)
- Website: tnurbantree.tn.gov.in/kancheepuram/

Kanchipuram (IAST: kāñcipuram; [kaːɲdʑipuɾam]), also known as Kanjeevaram or Kancheepuram, is a city in the Indian state of Tamil Nadu in the Chennai metropolitan area. Known as the City of Thousand Temples, Kanchipuram is known for its temple architectures, 1000-pillared halls, huge temple towers, and silk saris. Kanchipuram serves as an important domestic and international tourist destination. The city covers an area of 36.14 km^{2} (13.95 sq mi) and an estimated population of 232,816 in 2011. It is the administrative capital of Kanchipuram district. Kanchipuram is well-connected by road and rail.

Kanchipuram is a Tamil name formed by combining two words, "kanchi" and "puram," together meaning "the city of kanchi flowers" (due to the abundance of kanchi flowers in those regions). The city is located on the banks of the Vegavathy River and Palar Rivers. Kanchipuram has been ruled by the Pallavas, the Medieval Cholas, the Later Cholas, the Later Pandyas, the Vijayanagara Empire, the Carnatic kingdom, and the British, who called the city "Conjeeveram". The city's historical monuments include the Kailasanathar Temple and the Vaikunta Perumal Temple. Historically, Kanchipuram was a centre of education and was known as the ghatikasthanam, or "place of learning". The city was also a religious centre of advanced education for Jainism and Buddhism between the 1st and 5th centuries.

In Vaishnava theology, Kanchipuram is one of the seven tirtha (pilgrimage) sites for spiritual liberation. The city houses the Varadharaja Perumal Temple, Ekambareswarar Temple, Kamakshi Amman Temple, Kumarakottam Temple, and the Chitragupta temple, which are some of the major Hindu temples in the state. Of the 108 temples of the Hindu god Vishnu extolled in the work Naalayira Divya Prabandham, 15 are located in Kanchipuram.

The city is significant to the traditions of Sri Vaishnavism, Shaktism, and Shaivism. Silk-sari weaving is a major traditional occupation in and around Kanchipuram, while agriculture is an important livelihood in the surrounding district.

Kanchipuram is administered by the Kanchipuram City Municipal Corporation. Its municipality was originally constituted in 1866 and was upgraded to a municipal corporation in October 2021. It is the headquarters of the Kanchi matha, a Hindu monastic institution believed by its followers to have been founded by the Hindu saint and commentator Adi Shankara, and was the capital city of the Pallava Kingdom between the 4th and 9th centuries.

Kanchipuram was chosen as one of the heritage cities for the Heritage City Development and Augmentation Yojana scheme of the Government of India.

== Etymology ==
Kanchipuram was known in early Tamil and Sanskrit literature as Kanchi or Kachipedu. In the Sanskrit the word is split into two: ka and anchi. Ka means Brahma and anchi means worship, showing that Kanchi stands for the place where Varadharaja Perumal was worshipped by Brahma. Brahma has sculpted Athi Varadhar and worshipped here. In Sanskrit the term Kanci means girdle and explanation is given that the city is like a girdle to the earth. The earliest Sanskrit inscriptions from the Gupta period (early 4th century-CE to late 5th century-CE) denote the city as Kanchipuram, where King Visnugopa was defeated by Samudragupta. Patanjali (between 2nd century BCE and 5th century CE) refers to the city in his Mahabhasya as Kanchipuraka. The city was referred to by various names like Kanchi, Kanchipedu and Kanchipuram. The Pallava inscriptions from (250–355) and the inscriptions of the Chalukya dynasty refer the city as Kanchipura. Jaina Kanchi refers to the area around Tiruparutti Kundram. During the British rule, the city was known as Conjeevaram and later as Kanchipuram. Both Kanchipuram and Kancheepuram are used as English spellings. The municipal corporation and district administration use Kancheepuram in their official English names.

It finds its mention in Pāṇini's Ashtadhyayi as Kanchi-prastha and in several Puranas. It is also one of the seven cities that provides liberation.

== History ==
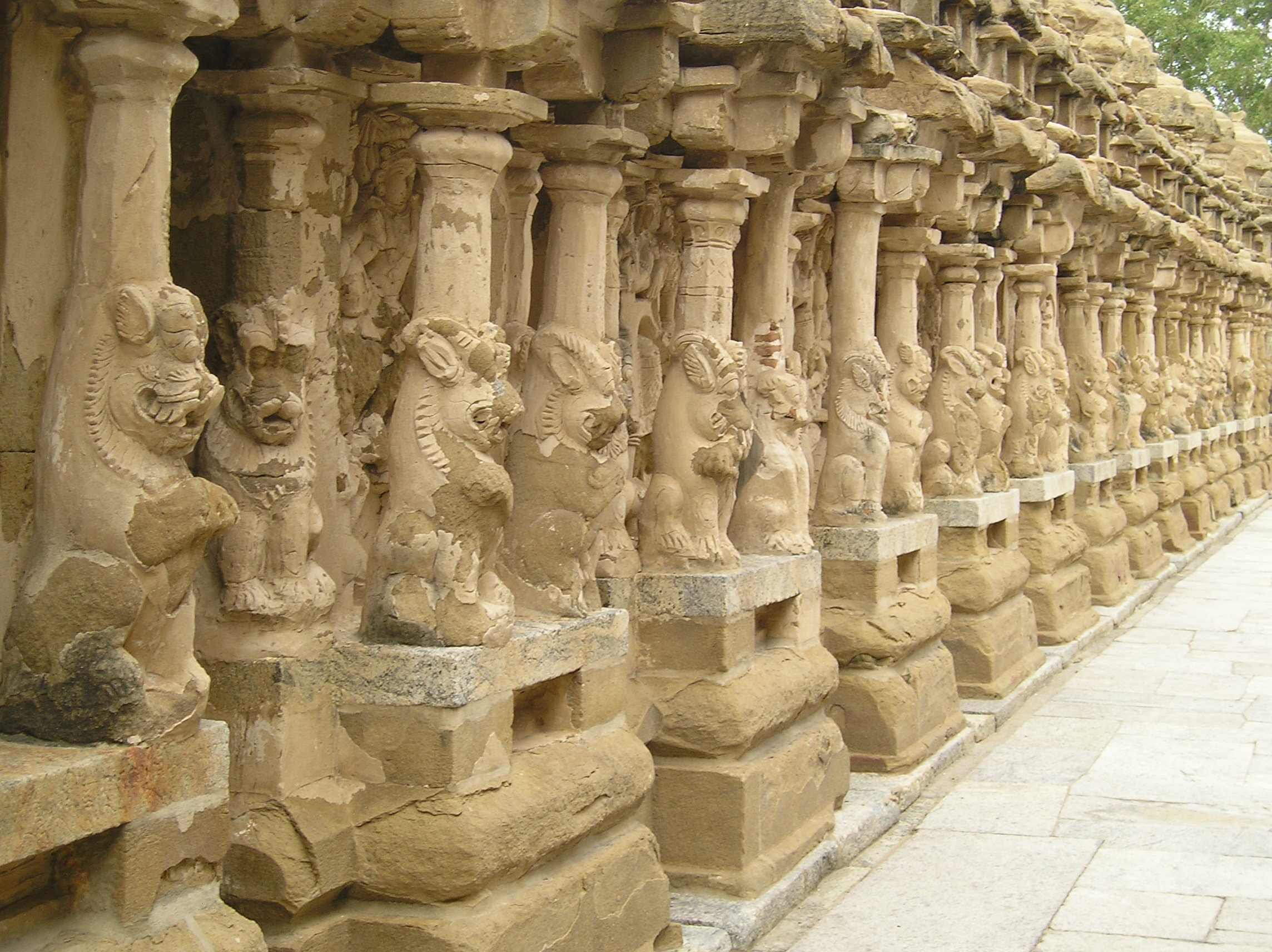
Sculptures inside Kanchipuram Kailasanathar Temple – the oldest existing temple in the city

Kanchipuram Timeline
An approximate time-scale of Kanchipuram rulers.

The earliest references to Kanchipuram are found in the books of the Sanskrit grammarian Patanjali, who lived between the 3rd and 2nd centuries BCE. The city was part of the Dravida kingdom of the Mahabharata and was described as "the best among cities" (Sanskrit: Nagareshu Kanchi) by the 4th-century Sanskrit poet, Kalidasa. The city finds mention in the classical Tamil language Sangam literature dated 300 BCE like Manimegalai and Perumpāṇāṟṟuppaṭai. While it is widely accepted that Kanchipuram had served as an Early Chola capital, the claim has been contested by Indian historian P. T. Srinivasa Iyengar who wrote that the Tamil culture of the Sangam period did not spread through the Kanchipuram district and cites the Sanskritic origins of its name in support of his claim.

Kanchipuram grew in importance when the Pallavas, wary of constant invasions from the north, moved their capital south to the city in the 6th century. The Pallavas fortified the city with ramparts, wide moats, well-laid-out roads, and artistic temples. During the reign of the Pallava King Mahendravarman I, the Chalukya King Pulakesin II (610–642) invaded the Pallava kingdom as far as the Kaveri River. The Pallavas successfully defended Kanchipuram and foiled repeated attempts to capture the city. A second invasion ended disastrously for Pulakesin II, who was forced to retreat to his capital Vatapi which was besieged and Pulakesin II was killed by Narasimhavarman I (630–668), son of Mahendravarman I (600–630), at the Battle of Vatapi. Under the Pallavas, Kanchipuram flourished as a centre of Hindu and Buddhist learning. King Narasimhavarman II built the city's important Hindu temples, the Vaikuntha Perumal Temple, Kanchi Kailasanathar Temple, the Varadharaja Perumal Temple and the Iravatanesvara Temple. Xuanzang, a Chinese traveller who visited Kanchipuram in 640, recorded that the city was 6 miles (9.7 km) in circumference and that its people were renowned for their bravery, piety, love of justice and veneration for learning.

The Medieval Chola king Aditya I conquered the Pallava kingdom, including Kanchipuram, after defeating the Pallava ruler Aparajitavarman (880–897) in about 890. Under the Cholas, the city was the headquarters of the northern viceroyalty. The province was renamed Jayamkonda Cholamandalam during the reign of King Raja Raja Chola I (985–1014), who constructed the Karchapeswarar Temple and renovated the Kamakshi Amman Temple. His son, Rajendra Chola I (1012–44) constructed the Yathothkari Perumal Temple. According to the Siddhantasaravali of Trilocana Sivacharya, Rajendra Chola I brought a band of Saivas with him on his return from the Chola expedition to North India and settled them in Kanchipuram. In about 1218, the Pandya king Maravarman Sundara Pandyan (1216–1238) invaded the Chola country, making deep inroads into the kingdom which was saved by the intervention of the Hoysala king Vira Narasimha II (1220–1235), who fought on the side of the Chola king Kulothunga Chola III. Inscriptions indicate the presence of a powerful Hoysala garrison in Kanchipuram, which remained in the city until about 1230. Shortly afterwards, Kanchipuram was conquered by the Cholas, from whom Jatavarman Sundara Pandyan I took the city in 1258. The city remained with the Pandyas until 1311 when the Sambuvarayars declared independence, taking advantage of the anarchy caused by Malik Kafur's invasion. After short spells of occupation by Ravivarman Kulasekhara of Venad (Quilon, Kerala) in 1313–1314 and the Kakatiya ruler Prataparudra II, Kanchipuram was conquered by the Vijayanagara general Kumara Kampana, who defeated the Madurai Sultanate in 1361.

The Vijayanagara Empire ruled Kanchipuram from 1361 to 1645. The earliest inscriptions attesting to Vijayanagara rule are those of Kumara Kampanna from 1364 and 1367, which were found in the precincts of the Kailasanathar Temple and Varadharaja Perumal Temple respectively. His inscriptions record the re-institution of Hindu rituals in the Kailasanathar Temple that had been abandoned during the Muslim invasions. Inscriptions of the Vijayanagara kings Harihara II, Deva Raya II, Krishna Deva Raya, Achyuta Deva Raya, Sriranga I, and Venkata II are found within the city. Harihara II endowed grants in favour of the Varadharaja Perumal Temple. In the 15th century, Kanchipuram was invaded by the Velama Nayaks in 1437, the Gajapati kingdom in 1463–1465 and 1474–75 and the Bahmani Sultanate in about 1480. A 1467 inscription of Virupaksha Raya II mentions a cantonment in the vicinity of Kanchipuram. In 1486, Saluva Narasimha Deva Raya, the governor of the Kanchipuram region, overthrew the Sangama Dynasty of Vijayanagara and founded the Saluva Dynasty. Like most of his predecessors, Narasimha donated generously to the Varadharaja Perumal Temple. Kanchipuram was visited twice by the Vijayanagara king Krishna Deva Raya, considered to be the greatest of the Vijayanagara rulers, and 16 inscriptions of his time are found in the Varadharaja Perumal Temple. The inscriptions in four languages – Tamil, Telugu, Kannada, and Sanskrit – record the genealogy of the Tuluva kings and their contributions, along with those of their nobles, towards the upkeep of the shrine. His successor, Achyuta Deva Raya, reportedly had himself weighed against pearls in Kanchipuram and distributed the pearls amongst the poor. Throughout the second half of the 16th and first half of the 17th centuries, the Aravidu Dynasty tried to maintain a semblance of authority in the southern parts after losing their northern territories in the Battle of Talikota. Venkata II (1586–1614) tried to revive the Vijayanagara Empire, but the kingdom relapsed into confusion after his death and rapidly fell apart after the Vijayanagara king Sriranga III's defeat by the Golconda and Bijapur sultanates in 1646.

After the fall of the Vijayanagara Empire, Kanchipuram endured over two decades of political turmoil. The Golconda Sultanate gained control of the city in 1672, but lost it to Bijapur three years later. In 1676, Shivaji arrived in Kanchipuram at the invitation of the Golconda Sultanate in order to drive out the Bijapur forces. His campaign was successful and Kanchipuram was held by the Golconda Sultanate until its conquest by the Mughal Empire led by Aurangazeb in October 1687. In the course of their southern campaign, the Mughals defeated the Marathas under Sambhaji, the elder son of Shivaji, in a battle near Kanchipuram in 1688 which caused considerable damage to the city but cemented Mughal rule. Soon after, the priests at the Varadharaja Perumal, Ekambareshwarar and Kamakshi Amman temples, mindful of Aurangazeb's reputation for iconoclasm, transported the idols to southern Tamil Nadu and did not restore them until after Aurangzeb's death in 1707. Under the Mughals, Kanchipuram was part of the viceroyalty of the Carnatic which, in the early 1700s, began to function independently, retaining only a nominal acknowledgement of Mughal rule. The Marathas ruled Kanchipuram due to Islamic invasion during the Carnatic period in 1724 and 1740, and the Nizam of Hyderabad in 1742.

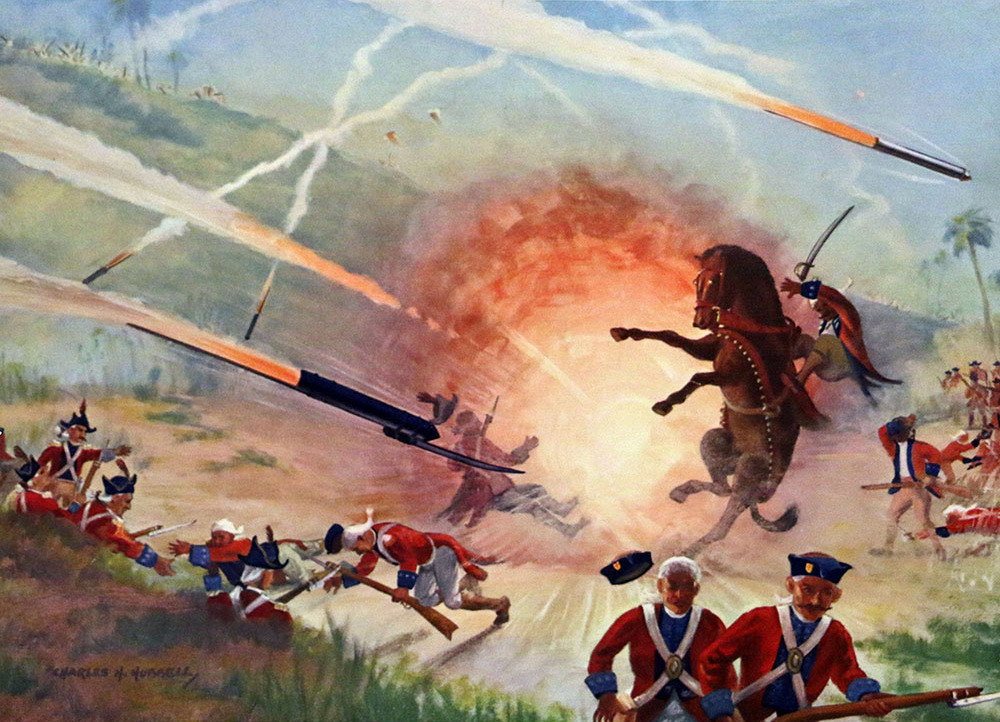
The Battle of Pollilur, fought near Kanchipuram in 1780

Kanchipuram was a battlefront for the British East India Company in the Carnatic Wars against the French East India Company and in the Anglo-Mysore Wars with the Sultanate of Mysore.The popular 1780 Battle of Pollilur of the Second Anglo-Mysore War, known for the use of rockets by Hyder Ali of Mysore, was fought in the village of Pullalur near Kanchipuram. In 1763, the British East India Company assumed indirect control from the Nawab of the Carnatic over the erstwhile Chingleput District, comprising the present-day Kanchipuram and Tiruvallur districts, in order to defray the expenses of the Carnatic wars. The Company brought the territory under their direct control during the Second Anglo-Mysore War, and the Collectorate of Chingleput was created in 1794. The district was split into two in 1997 and Kanchipuram made the capital of the newly created Kanchipuram district.

== Geography ==
Kanchipuram is located at 12.8387°N 79.7016°E, 72 km (45 mi) south-west of Chennai on the banks of the Vegavathi River, a tributary of the Palar River. The city covers an area of 11.6 km^{2} (4.5 sq mi) and has an elevation of 83.2 m (273 ft) above sea level.The land around Kanchipuram is flat and slopes towards the south and east. The soil in the region is mostly clay, with some loam, clay, and sand, which are suitable for use in construction. It has been postulated that the granite required for the Varadaraja Perumal Temple might have been obtained from the Sivaram Hills located 10 miles east of Kanchipuram. The area is classified as a Seismic Zone II region, and earthquakes of up to magnitude 6 on the Richter Scale may be expected. Kanchipuram is subdivided into two divisions –

1. Big Kanchi, also called Shiva Kanchi, occupies the western portion of the city and is the larger of the two divisions;
2. Little Kanchi, also called Vishnu Kanchi, is located on the eastern fringes of the city.

Most of the Shiva temples were in Big Kanchipuram while most of the Vishnu temples were in Little Kanchipuram.

Groundwater is the major source of water supplies used for irrigation – the block of Kanchipuram has 24 canals, 2809 tanks, 1878 tube wells and 3206 ordinary wells. The area is rich in medicinal plants, and historic inscriptions mention the medicinal value. Dimeria acutipes and Cynodon barberi are plants found only in Kanchipuram and Chennai.

== Climate ==
Kanchipuram has a tropical wet and dry climate (Köppen Aw), which is generally healthy. Temperatures reach an average maximum of 37.5 °C (99.5 °F) between April and July, and an average minimum of 16 °C (60.8 °F) between December and February. Relative humidities of between 58% and 84% prevail throughout the year. The humidity reaches its peak during the morning and is lowest in the evening. The relative humidity is higher between November and January and is lowest throughout June.

Most of the rain occurs in the form of cyclonic storms caused by depressions in the Bay of Bengal during the northeast monsoon. Kanchipuram receives rainfall from both Northeast Monsoon and Southwest Monsoon. The highest single day rainfall recorded in Kanchipuram is 450 millimetres or 17.72 inches on 10 October 1943. The prevailing wind direction is south-westerly in the morning and south-easterly in the evening. In 2015, Kanchipuram district registered the highest rainfall of 182 centimetres or 71.65 inches in Tamil Nadu during Northeast Monsoon season. On 13 November 2015, Kanchipuram recorded a mammoth 340 millimetres or 13.39 inches of rain, thereby causing severe flooding.

Climate data for Kanchipuram, Tamil Nadu
| Month | Jan | Feb | Mar | Apr | May | Jun | Jul | Aug | Sep | Oct | Nov | Dec | Year |
|---|---|---|---|---|---|---|---|---|---|---|---|---|---|
| Mean daily maximum °C (°F) | 29.1 (84.4) | 31.2 (88.2) | 33.4 (92.1) | 35.6 (96.1) | 38.2 (100.8) | 37.2 (99.0) | 35.2 (95.4) | 34.7 (94.5) | 34.1 (93.4) | 32.1 (89.8) | 29.3 (84.7) | 28.5 (83.3) | 33.2 (91.8) |
| Mean daily minimum °C (°F) | 19.2 (66.6) | 19.8 (67.6) | 22.0 (71.6) | 25.4 (77.7) | 27.3 (81.1) | 27.0 (80.6) | 25.9 (78.6) | 25.4 (77.7) | 24.8 (76.6) | 23.7 (74.7) | 21.6 (70.9) | 19.9 (67.8) | 23.5 (74.3) |
| Average rainfall mm (inches) | 25 (1.0) | 6 (0.2) | 4 (0.2) | 19 (0.7) | 59 (2.3) | 77 (3.0) | 108 (4.3) | 173 (6.8) | 132 (5.2) | 185 (7.3) | 209 (8.2) | 107 (4.2) | 1,104 (43.4) |
Source: climate-data.org

== Government and politics ==
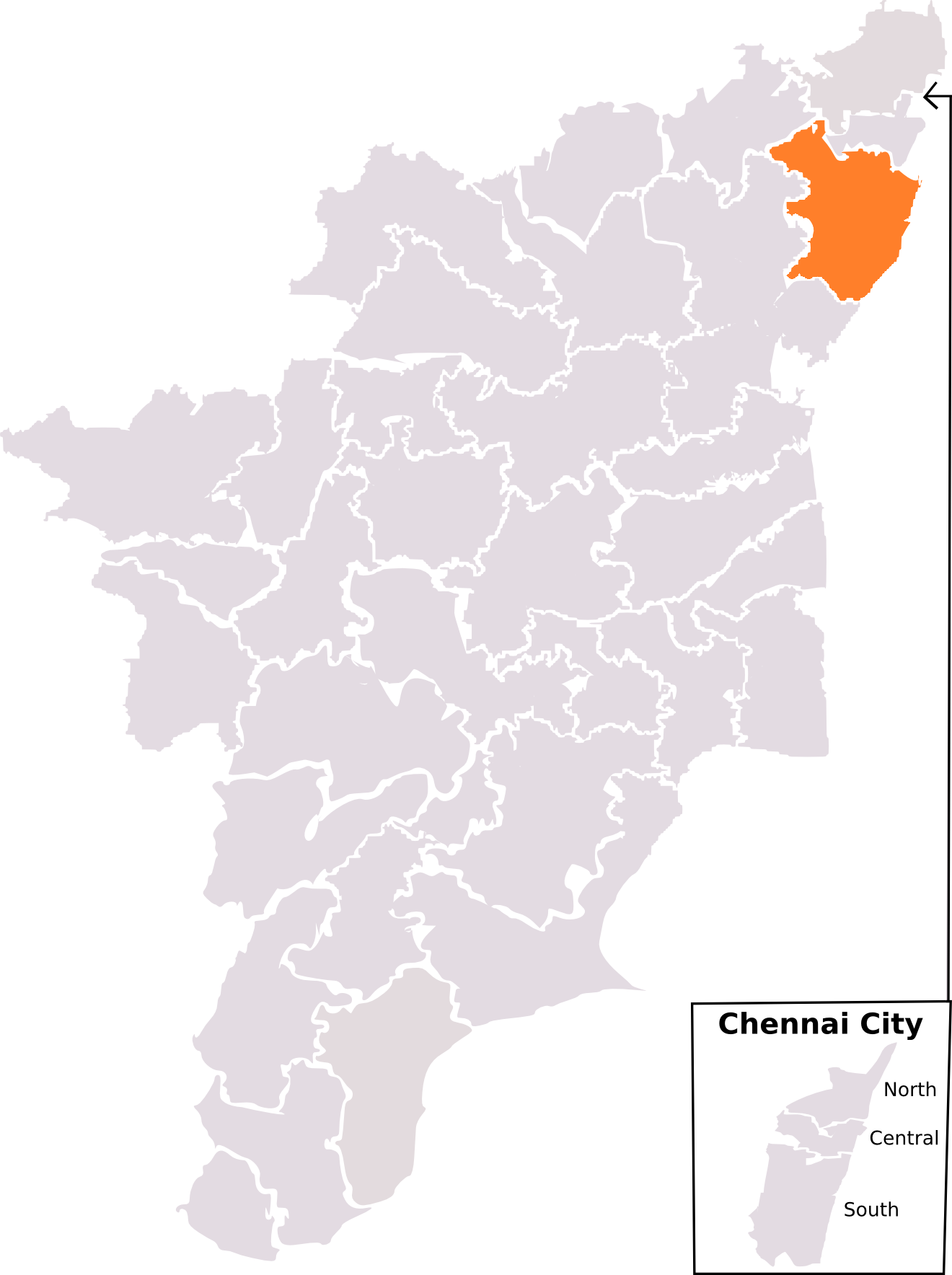
Kanchipuram Loksabha constituency

Municipal Corporation Officials
| Mayor | M. Mahalakshmi |
| Corporation Commissioner | G. Kannan |
| Deputy Mayor | R. Kumaragurunathan |
Elected Members
| Member of Legislative Assembly | C. V. M. P. Ezhilarasan |
| Member of Parliament | G. Selvam |

The Kanchipuram municipality was officially constituted in 1866, covering 7.68 km^{2} (2.97 sq mi), and its affairs were administered by a municipal committee. It was upgraded to a grade I municipality in 1947, selection grade municipality in 1983 and special grade municipality in 2008. As of 2011 the municipality occupies 36.14 km^{2} (13.95 sq mi), has 51 wards and is the biggest municipality in Kanchipuram district. The population of kanchipuram in 2011 was 2,34,353. The functions of the municipality are devolved into six departments: General, Engineering, Revenue, Public Health, city Planning and the Computer Wing, all of which are under the control of a Municipal Commissioner, who is the supreme executive head. The legislative powers are vested in a body of 51 members, each representing one ward. The legislative body is headed by an elected chairperson who is assisted by a deputy chairperson. On 24 August 2021, the state government announced the upgrading of Kanchipuram town to Kanchipuram City Municipal Corporation.

Kanchipuram comes under the Kanchipuram state assembly constituency. From the state delimitation after 1967, seven of the ten elections held between 1971 and 2011 were won by the All India Anna Dravida Munnetra Kazhagam (AIADMK). Dravida Munnetra Kazhagam (DMK) won the seat during the 1971 and 1989 elections and its ally Pattali Makkal Katchi won the seat during the 2006 elections. The current member of the legislative assembly is V. Somasundaram from the AIADMK party.

Kanchipuram Lok Sabha constituency is a newly formed constituency of the Parliament of India after the 2008 delimitation. The constituency originally existed for the 1951 election, and was formed in 2008 after merging the assembly segments of Chengalpattu, Thiruporur, Madurantakam (SC), Uthiramerur and Kanchipuram, which were part of the now defunct Chengalpattu constituency, and Alandur, which was part of the Chennai South constituency. This constituency is reserved for Scheduled Castes (SC) candidates. K. Maragatham from the All India Anna Dravida Munnetra Kazhagam is the current Member of Parliament for the constituency. Indian writer, politician and founder of the DMK, C. N. Annadurai, was born and raised in Kanchipuram. He was the first member of a Dravidian party to hold that post and was the first non-Congress leader to form a majority government in post-colonial India.

Policing in the city is provided by the Kanchipuram sub-division of the Tamil Nadu Police headed by a Deputy Superintendent of Police. The force's special units include prohibition enforcement, district crime, social justice and human rights, district crime records and special branch that operate at the district level police division, which is headed by a Superintendent of Police.

== Demographics ==
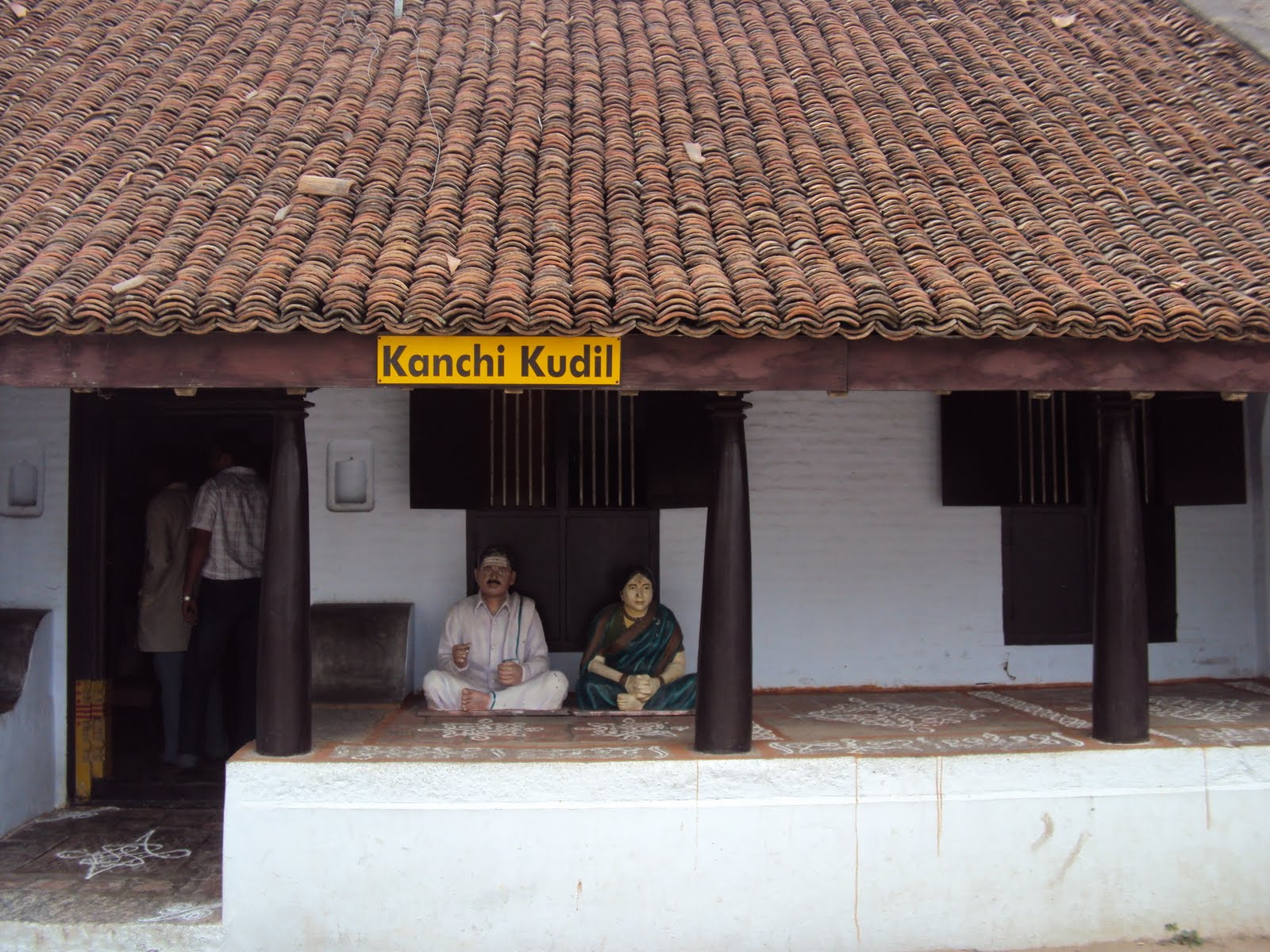
A house depicting old living style of Kanchipuram

Historical population
| Year | Pop. | ±% |
|---|---|---|
| 1871 | 37,275 | — |
| 1881 | 37,312 | +0.1% |
| 1891 | 42,547 | +14.0% |
| 1901 | 46,164 | +8.5% |
| 1911 | 53,864 | +16.7% |
| 1921 | 61,376 | +13.9% |
| 1931 | 65,258 | +6.3% |
| 1941 | 74,685 | +14.4% |
| 1951 | 84,810 | +13.6% |
| 1961 | 92,714 | +9.3% |
| 1971 | 110,657 | +19.4% |
| 1981 | 131,013 | +18.4% |
| 1991 | 144,955 | +10.6% |
| 2001 | 153,140 | +5.6% |
| 2011 | 164,265 | +7.3% |
Sources: 1871: 1901 – 1991: 2001: 2011:

During the rule of King Narasimha Varma in the 7th century, the city covered about 10 square kilometres (3.9 sq mi) and had a population of 10,000. The population increased to 13,000 in subsequent years and the city developed cross patterned links with rectangular streets. The settlements in the city were mostly caste based. During the period of Nandivarma Pallavan II, houses were built on raised platforms and burnt bricks. The concepts of the verandah in the front yard, garden in the backyard, ventilation facilities and drainage of rainwater were all introduced for the first time, while the Tiruvekka temple and houses of agricultural labourers were situated outside the city. There were provisions in the city's outskirts for training the cavalry and infantry.

During the Chola era, Kanchipuram was not the capital, but the kings had a palace in the city and a lot of development was extended eastwards. During the Vijayanagara period, the population rose to 25,000. There were no notable additions to the city's infrastructure during British rule. The British census of 1901 recorded that Kanchipuram had a population of 46,164, consisting of 44,684 Hindus, 1,313 Muslims, 49 Christians and 118 Jains.

Religious census
| Religion | Percent(%) |
| Hindu | 93.38% |
| Muslim | 5.24% |
| Christian | 0.83% |
| Jain | 0.4% |
| Sikh | 0.01% |
| Buddhist | 0.01% |
| Other | 0.11% |
| No religion | 0.01% |

Distribution of languages in Kanchipuram Urban(2011)
1. Tamil (87.4%)
2. Telugu (6.05%)
3. Urdu (2.45%)
4. saurashtra (1.96%)
5. Hindi (0.98%)
6. Kannada (0.70%)
7. Others (0.42%)

According to 2011 census, Kanchipuram had a population of 164,384 with a sex-ratio of 1,005 females for every 1,000 males, much above the national average of 929. A total of 15,955 were under the age of six, constituting 8,158 males and 7,797 females. Scheduled Castes and Scheduled Tribes accounted for 3.55% and 0.09% of the population respectively. The average literacy of the city was 79.51%, compared to the national average of 72.99%. The city had a total of 41807 households. There were a total of 61,567 workers, comprising 320 cultivators, 317 main agricultural labourers, 8,865 in household industries, 47,608 other workers, 4,457 marginal workers, 61 marginal cultivators, 79 marginal agricultural labourers, 700 marginal workers in household industries and 3,617 other marginal workers. About 8,00,000 (800,000) pilgrims visit the city every year as of 2001. As per the religious census of 2011, Kanchipuram had 93.38% Hindus, 5.24% Muslims, 0.83% Christians, 0.01% Sikhs, 0.01% Buddhists, 0.4% Jains, 0.11% following other religions and 0.01% following no religion or did not indicate any religious preference.

Kanchipuram has 416 hectares (1,030 acres) of residential properties, mostly around the temples. The commercial area covers 62 hectares (150 acres), constituting 6.58% of the city. Industrial developments occupy around 65 hectares (160 acres), where most of the handloom spinning, silk weaving, dyeing and rice production units are located. 89.06 hectares (220.1 acres) are used for transport and communications infrastructure, including bus stands, roads, streets and railways lines.

== Economy ==
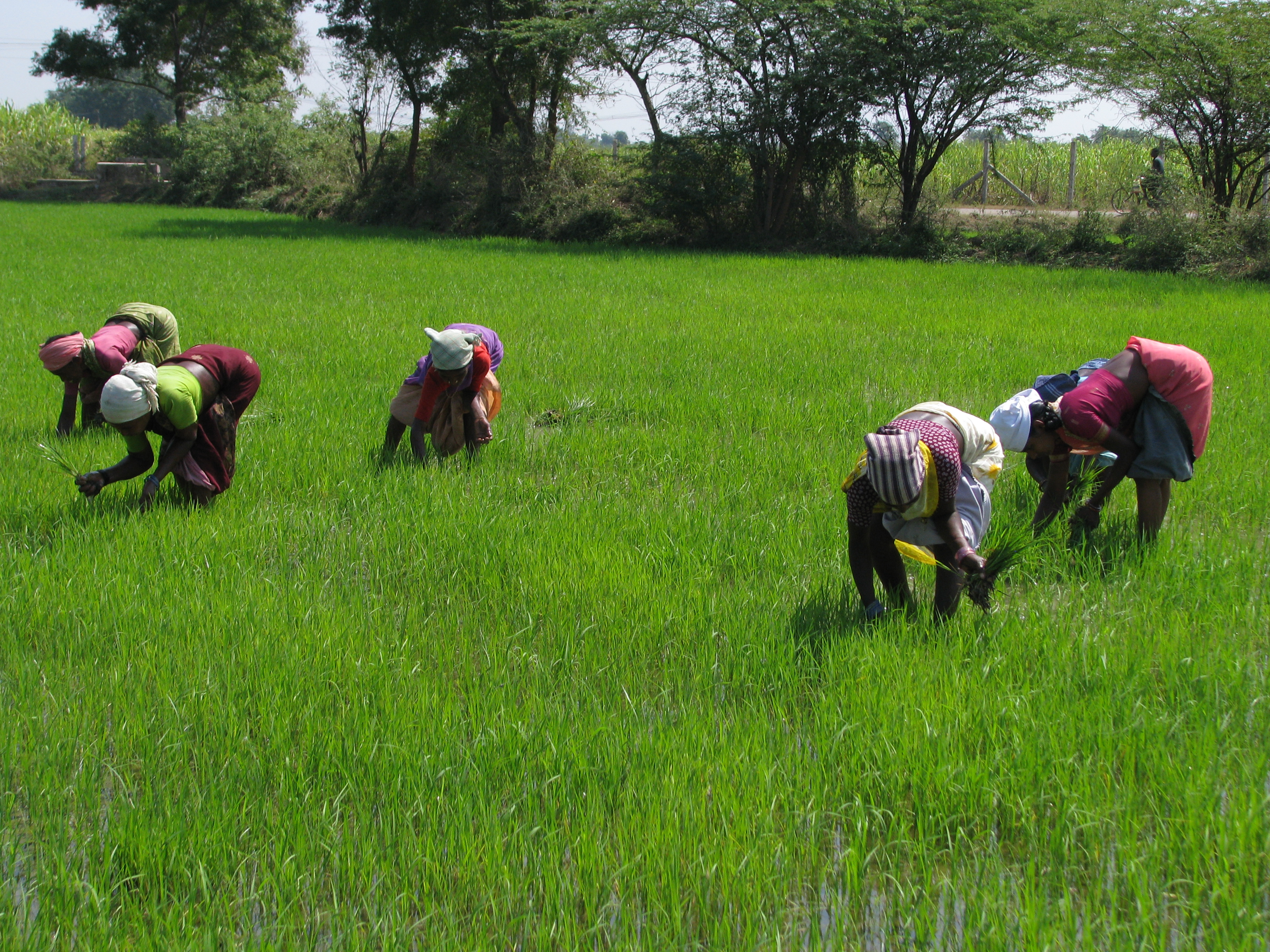
Agriculture in Kanchipuram

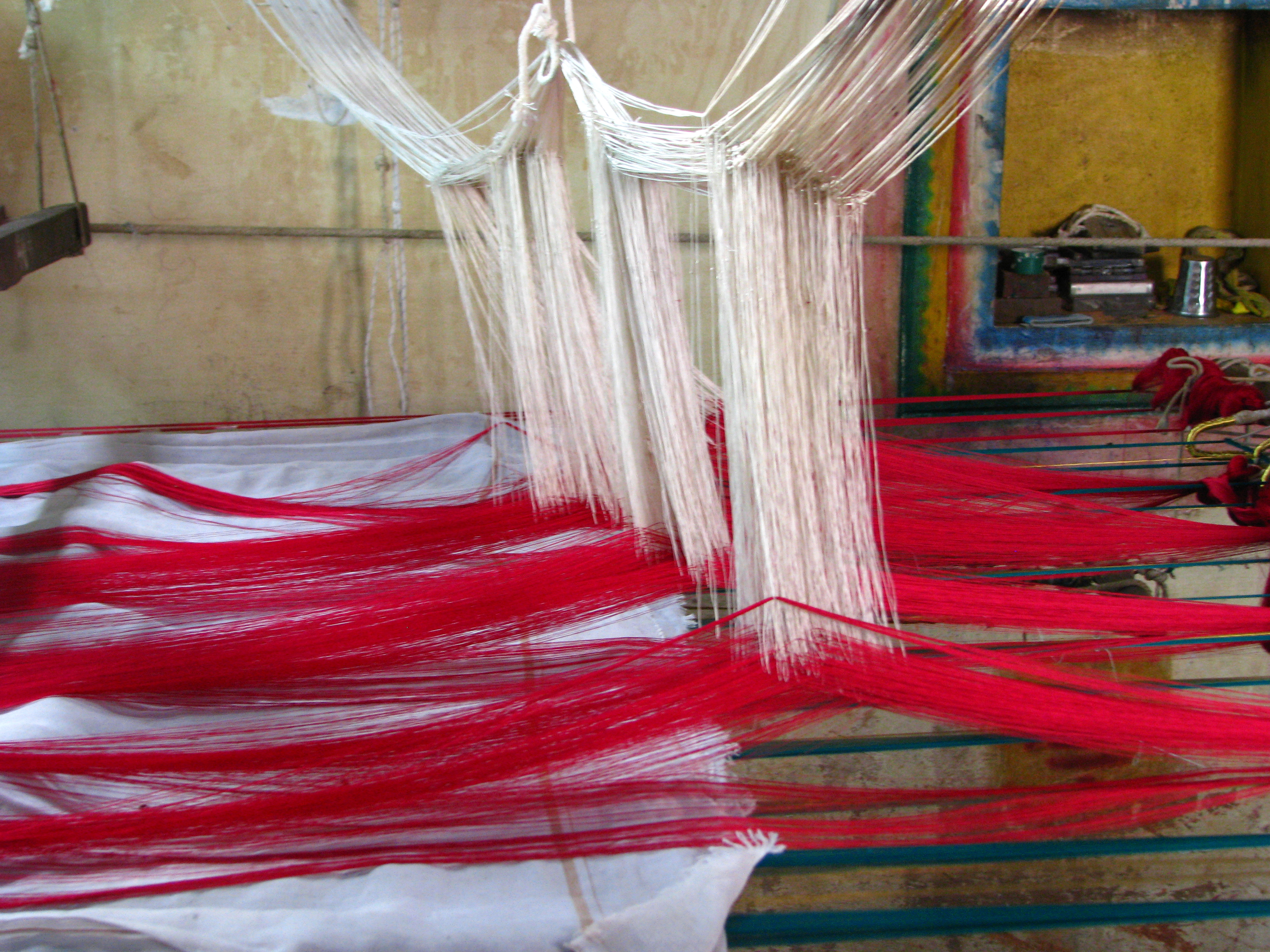
Silk sari weaving at Kanchipuram

As of 2008, an estimated 5,000 families were involved in sari production. The main industries are cotton production, light machinery and electrical goods manufacturing, and food processing. There are 25 silk and cotton yarn industries, 60 dyeing units, 50 rice mills and 42 other industries in Kanchipuram. Another important occupation is tourism and service related segments like hotels, restaurants and local transportation.

=== Kanchipuram Saree ===
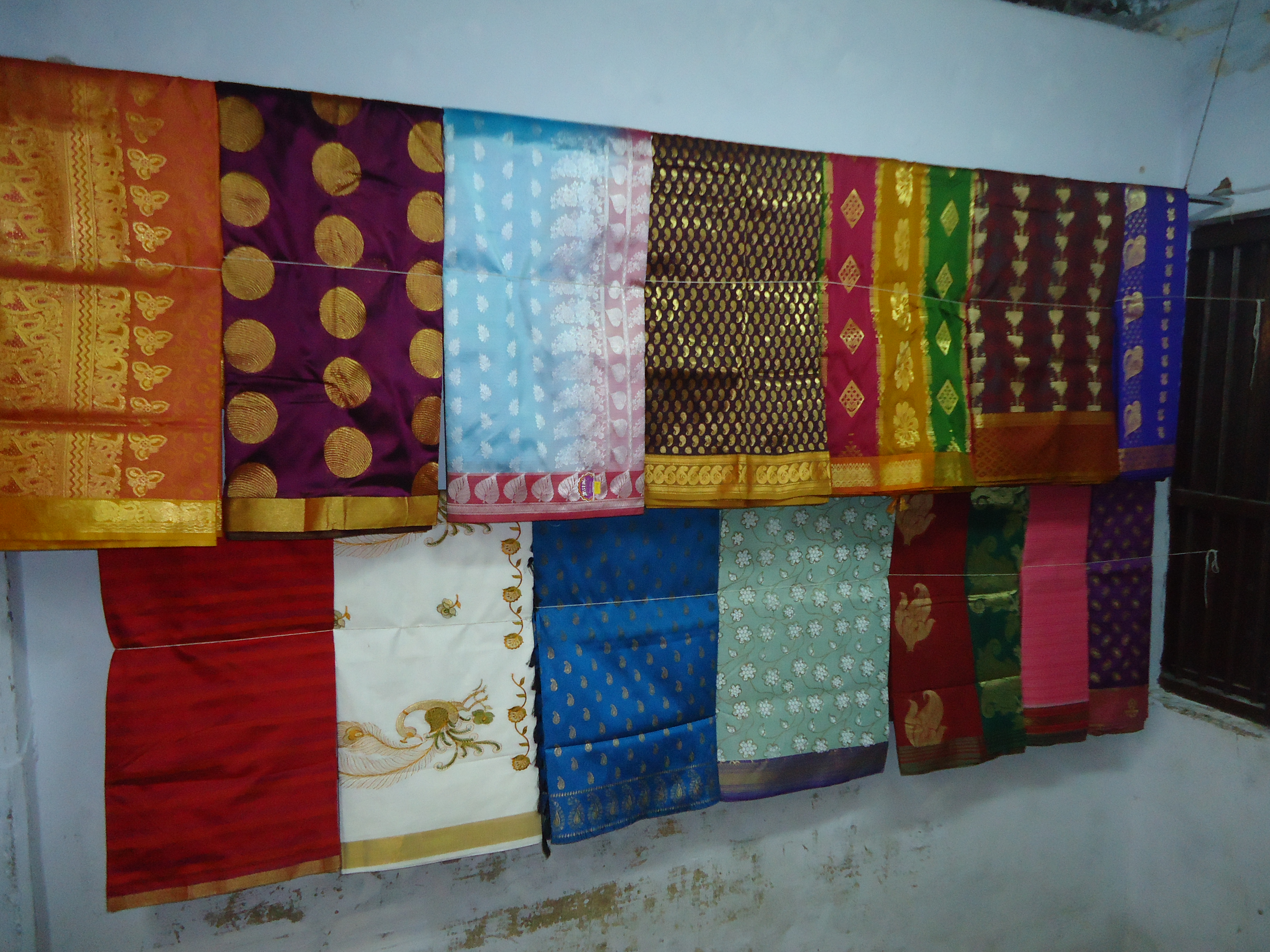
Kanchipuram silk saris hanging

Kanchipuram is a traditional centre of silk weaving and handloom industries for producing Kanchipuram Sarees. The industry is worth ₹ 100 cr (US$18.18 million), but the weaving community suffers from poor marketing techniques and duplicate market players. "Kancheepuram Silk" was registered as a geographical indication on 2 June 2005, with the Government of Tamil Nadu's Department of Handlooms and Textiles as the applicant. The silk trade in Kanchipuram began when King Raja Raja Chola I (985–1014) invited weavers from Saurashtra, Gujarat to migrate to Kanchi. The craft increased with the mass migration of weavers from Andhra Pradesh in the 15th century during the Vijayanagara rule. The city was razed during the French siege of 1757, but weaving re-emerged in the late 18th century.

Traditional Kanchipuram saris are woven from mulberry silk, commonly with contrasting borders and decorative zari threads. In the korvai technique, the body and border are woven separately but interlocked during weaving to form a strong joint. Traditional designs include temple motifs, checks, stripes and patterns inspired by birds and flowers.

=== Human rights ===
Kanchipuram has more than the national average rate of child labour and bonded labour. The local administration is accused of aiding child labour by opening night schools in Kanchipuram from 1999. There were an estimated 40,000 to 50,000 child workers in Kanchipuram in 1995 compared to 85,000 in the same industry in Varanasi. Children were commonly traded for sums of between ₹ 10,000 and 15,000 (200 – $300) and there had been cases where whole families are held in bondage. Child labour is prohibited in India by the Children (Pledging of Labour) Act and Child Labour (Prohibition and Regulation) Act, but these laws were not strictly enforced.

== Education ==
Kanchipuram is traditionally a centre of religious education for the Hindu, Jainism and Buddhism faiths. The Buddhist monasteries acted as nucleus of the Buddhist educational system. With the gradual resurrection of Hinduism during the reign of Mahendra Varman I, the Hindu educational system gained prominence with Sanskrit emerging as the official language.

As of 2011 Kanchipuram has 49 registered schools, 16 of which are run by the city municipality. The district administration opened night schools for educating children employed in the silk weaving industry – as of December 2001, these schools together were educating 127 people and 260 registered students from September 1999. Larsen & Toubro inaugurated the first rail construction training centre in India at Kanchipuram on 24 May 2012, that can train 300 technicians and 180 middle-level managers and engineers each year. Sri Chandrasekharendra Saraswathi Viswa Mahavidyalaya and Chettinad Academy of Research and Education (CARE) are the two Deemed universities present in Kanchipuram. Pachaiyappa's College for Men was established in June 1950 by Pachaiyappa's Charities. It initially operated from a rented building in Little Kanchipuram, offering intermediate courses affiliated with the University of Madras. The college subsequently expanded its academic programmes and moved to a permanent campus.

Kanchipuram is home to one of the four Indian Institute of Information Technology, a public private partnered institute, offering undergraduate and post graduate programs in information technology. The city has two medical colleges – Arignar Anna Memorial Cancer Institute and Hospital, established in 1969, is operated by the Department of Health, Government of Tamil Nadu and the privately owned Meenakshi Medical College. The city has 6 engineering colleges, 3 polytechnic institutes and 6 arts and science colleges.

== Religion ==
In April 2021, India placed a group of eleven Kanchipuram temples on its UNESCO World Heritage Tentative List. The proposed group includes the Kailasanathar Temple, Vaikunta Perumal Temple, Varadharaja Perumal Temple and Ekambareswarar Temple. The nomination highlights the development of South Indian temple architecture under the Pallavas, particularly the transition from rock-cut architecture to free-standing structural temples, which influenced later dynasties.

=== Hinduism ===
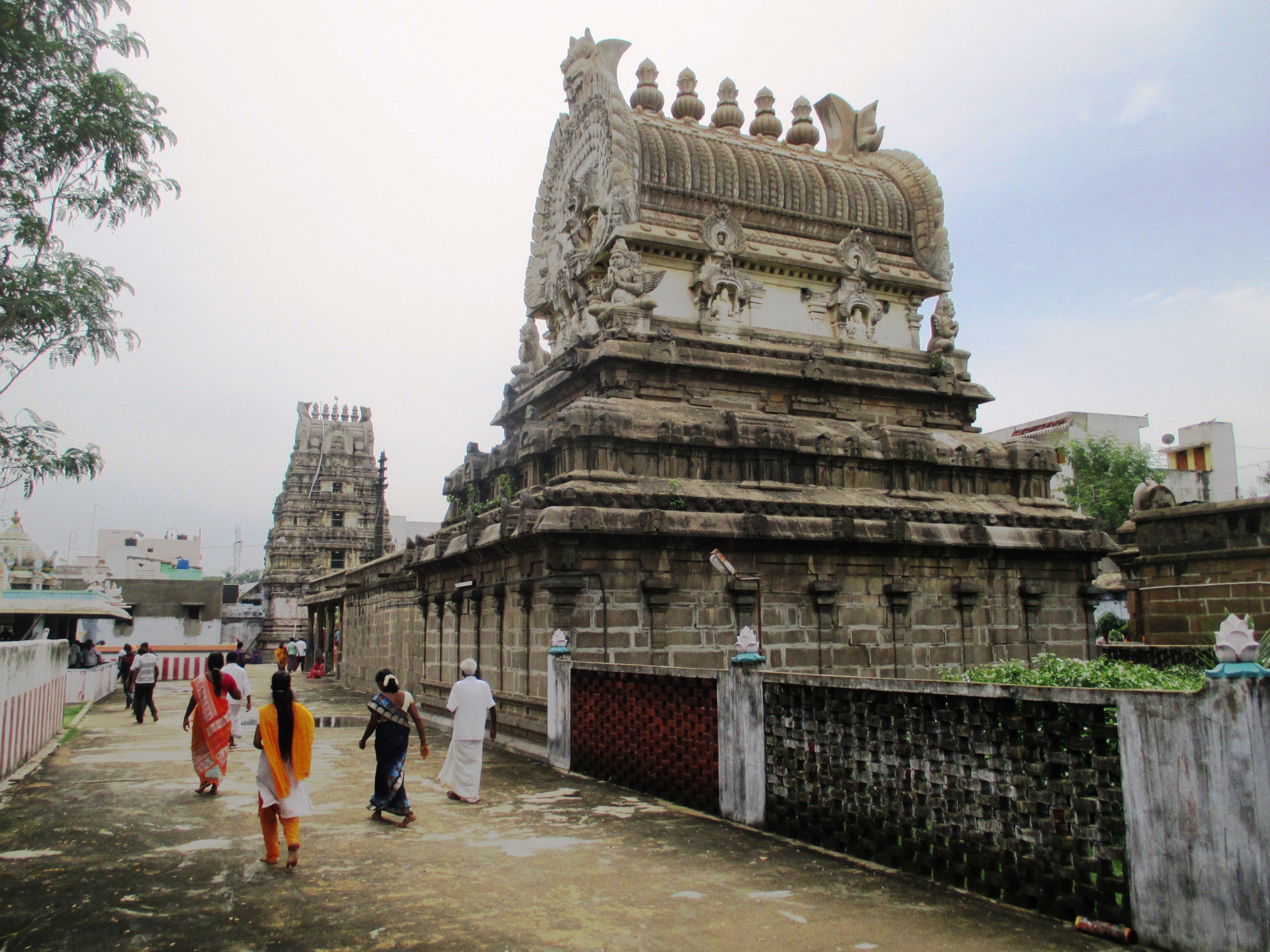
Pandava Thoothar Perumal Temple – A Vaishnavite temple in the city

Hindus regard Kanchipuram to be one of the seven holiest cities in India, the Sapta Puri. According to Hinduism, a kṣhetra is a sacred ground, a field of active power, and a place where final attainment, or moksha, can be obtained. The Garuda Purana says that seven cities, including Kanchipuram are providers of moksha. The city is a pilgrimage site for both Vaishnavites and Shaivites.

The Varadharaja Perumal Temple, dedicated to Vishnu and covering 23 acres (93,000 m^{2}), is the largest Vishnu temple in Kanchipuram. The temple has around 350 inscriptions from various dynasties like Chola, Pandya, Kandavarayas, Cheras, Kakatiya, Sambuvaraya, Hoysala and Vijayanagara indicating various donations to the temple and also the political situation of Kanchipuram. The Varadharaja Perumal Temple was renovated by the Cholas in 1053 and it was expanded during the reigns of the Chola kings Kulottunga Chola I and Vikrama Chola. In the 14th century, another wall and a gopura was built by the later Chola kings. It is one of the Divya Desams, the 108 holiest abodes of Vishnu in Sri Vaishnavism. The temple features carved lizards, one plated with gold and another with silver, over the sanctum. Robert Clive is said to have presented an emerald necklace to the temple. It is called the Clive Makarakandi, and is still used to decorate the deity on ceremonial occasions.

The Yathothkari Perumal Temple is the birthplace of the Alvar saint, Poigai Alvar.

The Tiru Parameswara Vinnagaram has a three-tier shrine, one over the other, with Vishnu depicted in each of them. The corridor around the sanctum has a series of sculptures depicting the Pallava rule and conquest. It is the oldest Vishnu temple in the city and was built by the Pallava king Paramesvaravarman II (728–731).

Ashtabujakaram, Tiruththanka, Tiruvelukkai, Ulagalantha Perumal Temple, Tiru pavla vannam, Pandava Thoothar Perumal Temple are among the Divya Desams, the 108 famous temples of Vishnu in the city. There are five other Divya Desams, three inside the Ulagalantha Perumal temple, one each in Kamakshi Amman Temple and Ekambareswarar Temple respectively.

The Ekambareswarar Temple in northern Kanchipuram, dedicated to Shiva, is the largest temple in the city. Its gateway tower, or gopuram, is 59 metres (194 ft) tall, making it one of the tallest temple towers in India. The temple is one of five called Pancha Bhuta Sthalams, which represent the manifestation of the five prime elements of nature; namely land, water, air, sky, and fire. There is also a Divya Desam inside the Ekambaranathar temple called the Chandrachuda Perumal or Nilathingal Thundam Perumal temple. The Ekambareswarar temple represents the earth.

The Kailasanathar Temple, dedicated to Shiva and built by the Pallavas, is the oldest Hindu temple in existence and is declared an archaeological monument by the Archaeological Survey of India. It has a series of cells with sculptures inside.

In the Kamakshi Amman Temple, Parvati is depicted in the form of a yantra, chakra or peetam (basement). In this temple, the yantra is placed in front of the deity. Adi Shankara is closely associated with this temple and is believed to have established the Kanchi Matha after this temple.

The Muktheeswarar Temple, built by Nandivarman Pallava II (720–796) and Iravatanesvara Temple built by Narasimhavarman Pallava II (720–728) are the other Shiva temples from the Pallava period. Kachi Metrali – Karchapeswarar Temple, Onakanthan Tali, Kachi Anekatangapadam, Kuranganilmuttam, and Karaithirunathar Temple in Tirukalimedu are the Shiva temples in the city revered in Tevaram, the Tamil Shaiva canonical work of the 7th–8th centuries.

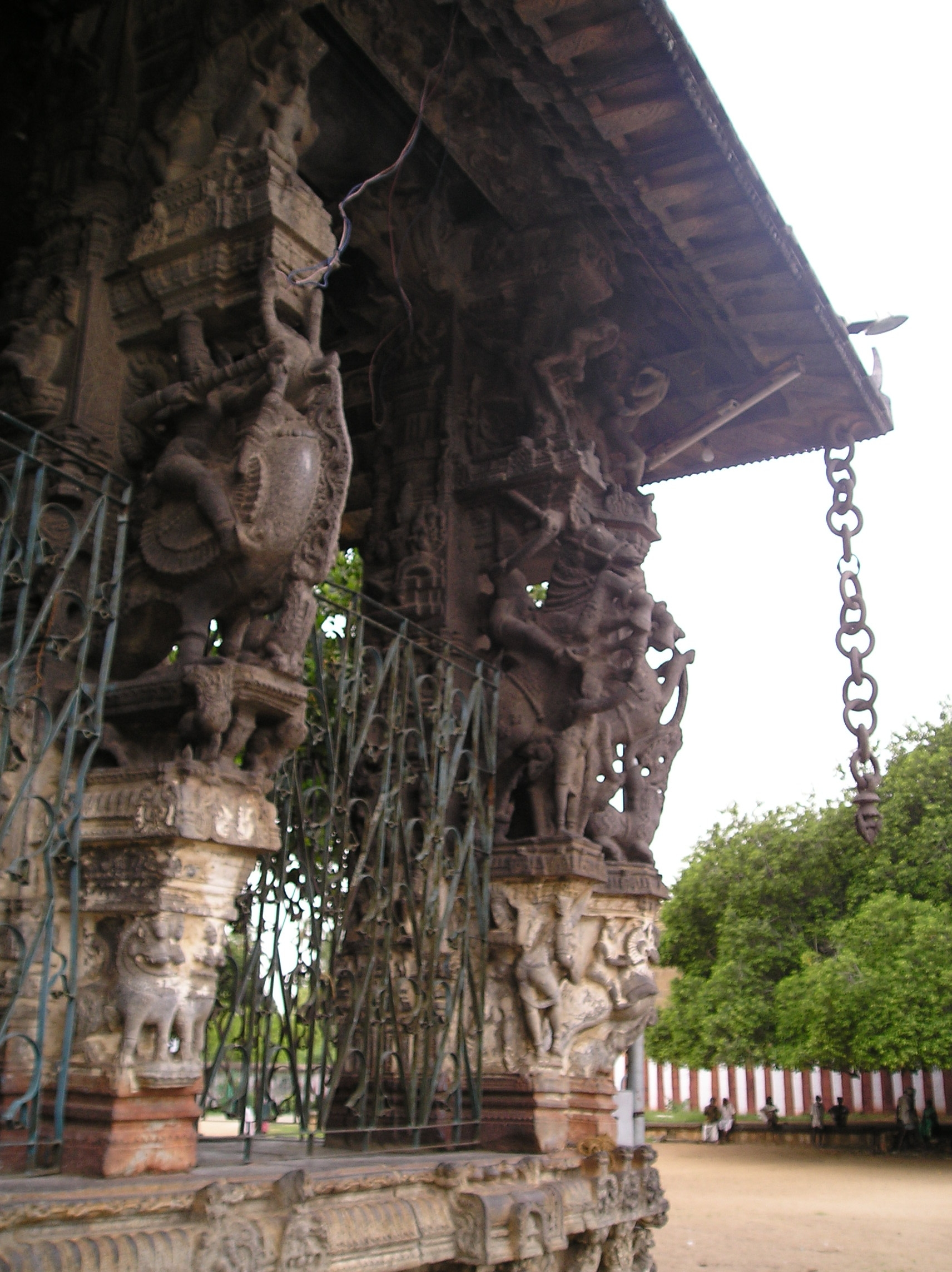
Sculpted pillars and stone chain in Varadharaja Perumal Temple

The Kumarakottam Temple, dedicated to Murugan (Kartikeya), is located between the Ekambareswarar temple and Kamakshi Amman temple, leading to the cult of Somaskanda. The Kandapuranam, the Tamil religious work on Murugan, translated from the Sanskrit Skanda Purana, was composed in 1625 by Kachiappa Shivacharya in the temple.

The Kanchi Matha is a Hindu monastic institution, whose official history states that it was founded by Adi Shankara of Kaladi, tracing its history back to the 5th century BCE. A related claim is that Adi Shankara came to Kanchipuram, and that he established the Kanchi matha named "Dakshina Moolamnaya Sarvagnya Sri Kanchi Kamakoti Peetam" in a position of supremacy, namely Sarvagnya Peeta, over the other mathas (religious institutions) of the subcontinent, before his death there. Other historical accounts state that the matha was established probably in the 18th century in Kumbakonam, as a branch of the Sringeri Matha, and that it declared itself independent.

Another matha which was famous in ancient times was the Upanishad Bramham Mutt, located near Kailasanathar temple, Kanchipuram. It has the Mahasamadhi of Upanishad Brahmayogin, a saint who wrote commentaries on all the major Upanishads in Hinduism. It is said that the sage Sadasiva Brahmendra took to sanyasa at this matha.

Injimedu is also called Yajna Vedhikai, as many yajna rituals are performed in the village. It is located at 3 km from Pernamallur Town. The best route to go injimedu is

1. Kanchipuram-Cheyyaru-Pernamallur-Injimedu
2. Tambaram-Uthiramerur-Vandavasi-Mazhaiyur(Chetpet Road)-Chinna kozhipuliyur-Injimedu.

=== Buddhism ===
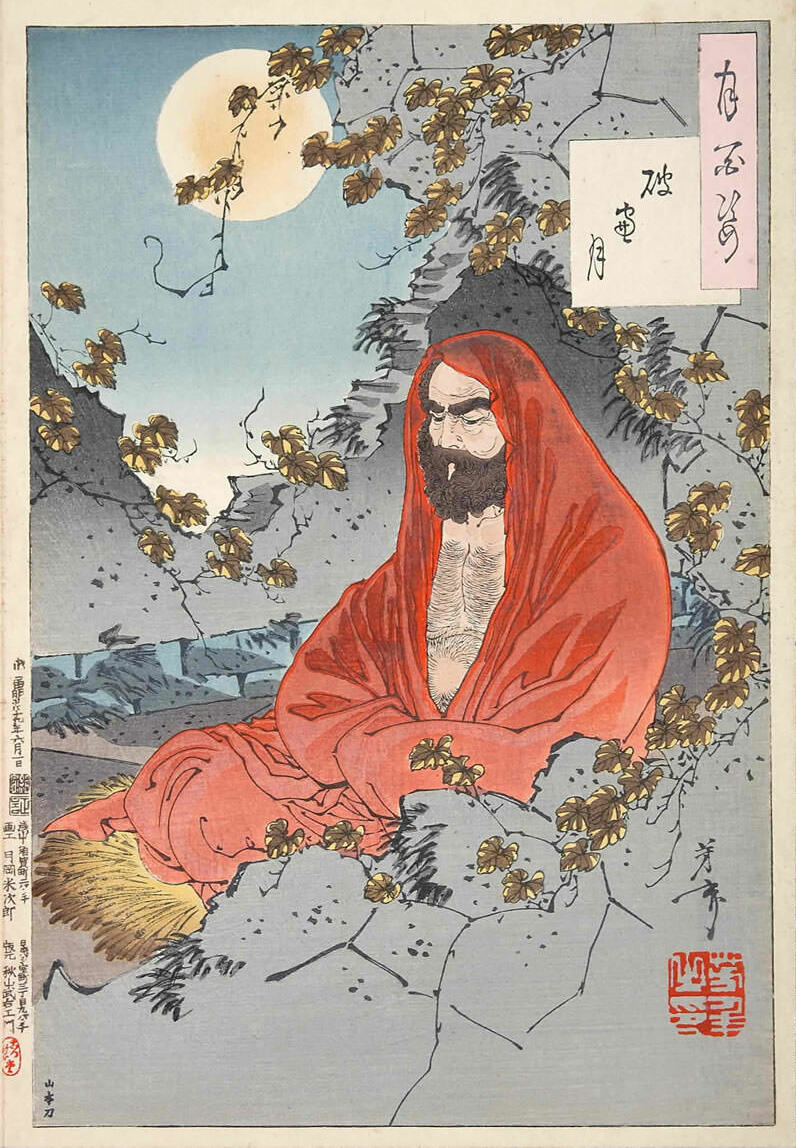
Bodhidharma is believed to have spread Zen school of Buddhism from India to China

Buddhism is believed to have flourished in Kanchipuram between the 1st and 5th centuries. Some notable Buddhists associated with Kanchipuram are Āryadeva (2nd–3rd centuries) – a successor of Nāgārjuna of Nalanda University, Dignaga and the Pali commentators Buddhaghosa and Dhammapala. According to a popular tradition, Bodhidharma, a 5th/6th-century Buddhist monk and founder of Shaolin Kung Fu was the third son of a Pallava king from Kanchipuram. However, other traditions ascribe his origins to other places in Asia. Buddhists institutions from Kanchipuram were instrumental in spreading Theravada Buddhism to the Mon people of Myanmar and Thailand who in return spread the religion to the incoming Burmese and Thai people.

Inscriptions on Buddhist sculptures discovered at Kurkihar in present-day Bihar provide evidence of connections between Kanchi and Buddhist monasteries in eastern India during the early medieval period. Historian Birendra Nath Prasad identified donors from Kanchi associated with at least five of the fourteen ninth-century inscribed images he examined, making them the largest identifiable group of donors from a single place of origin.

=== Jainism ===
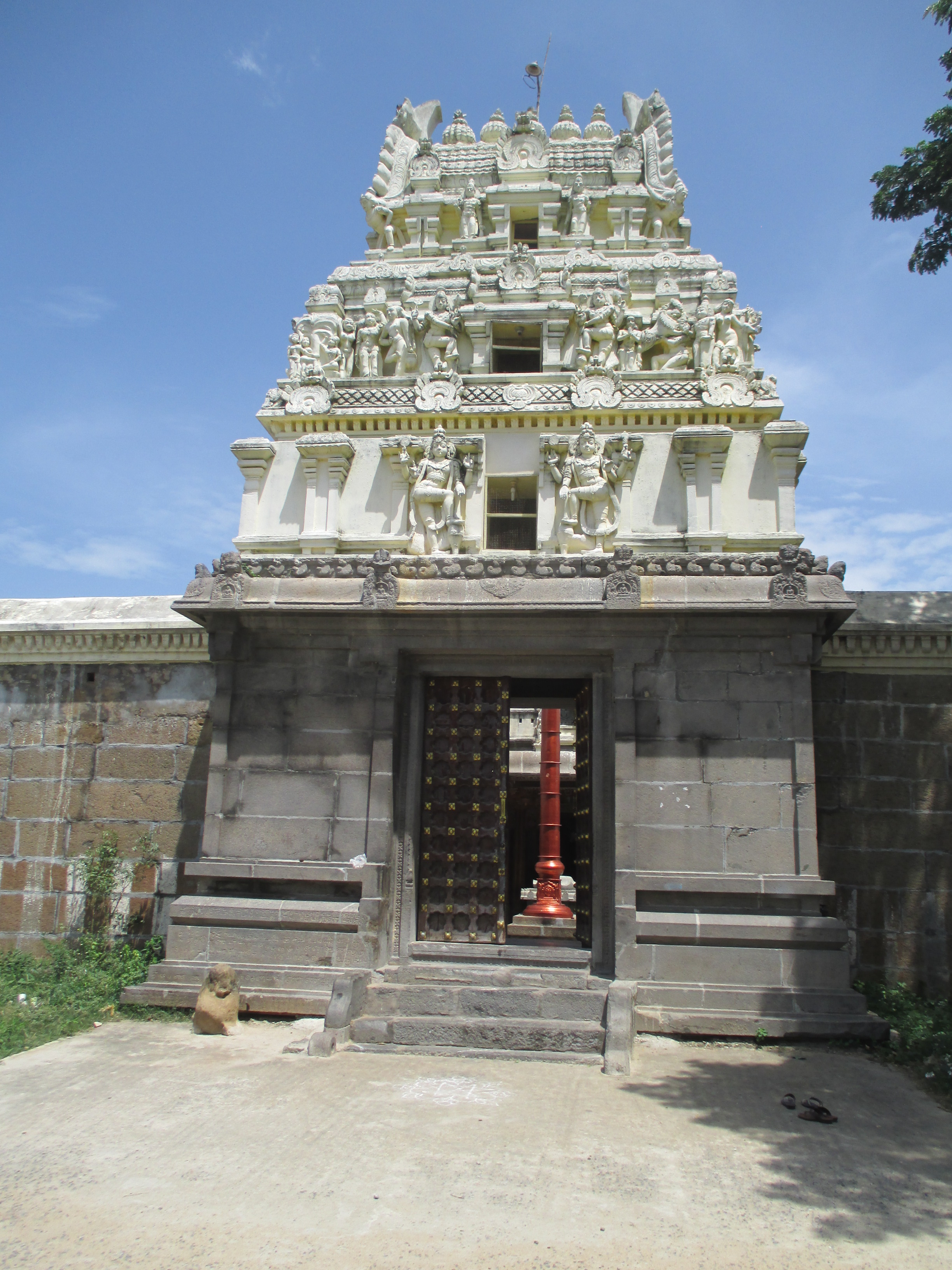
Trilokyanatha Temple

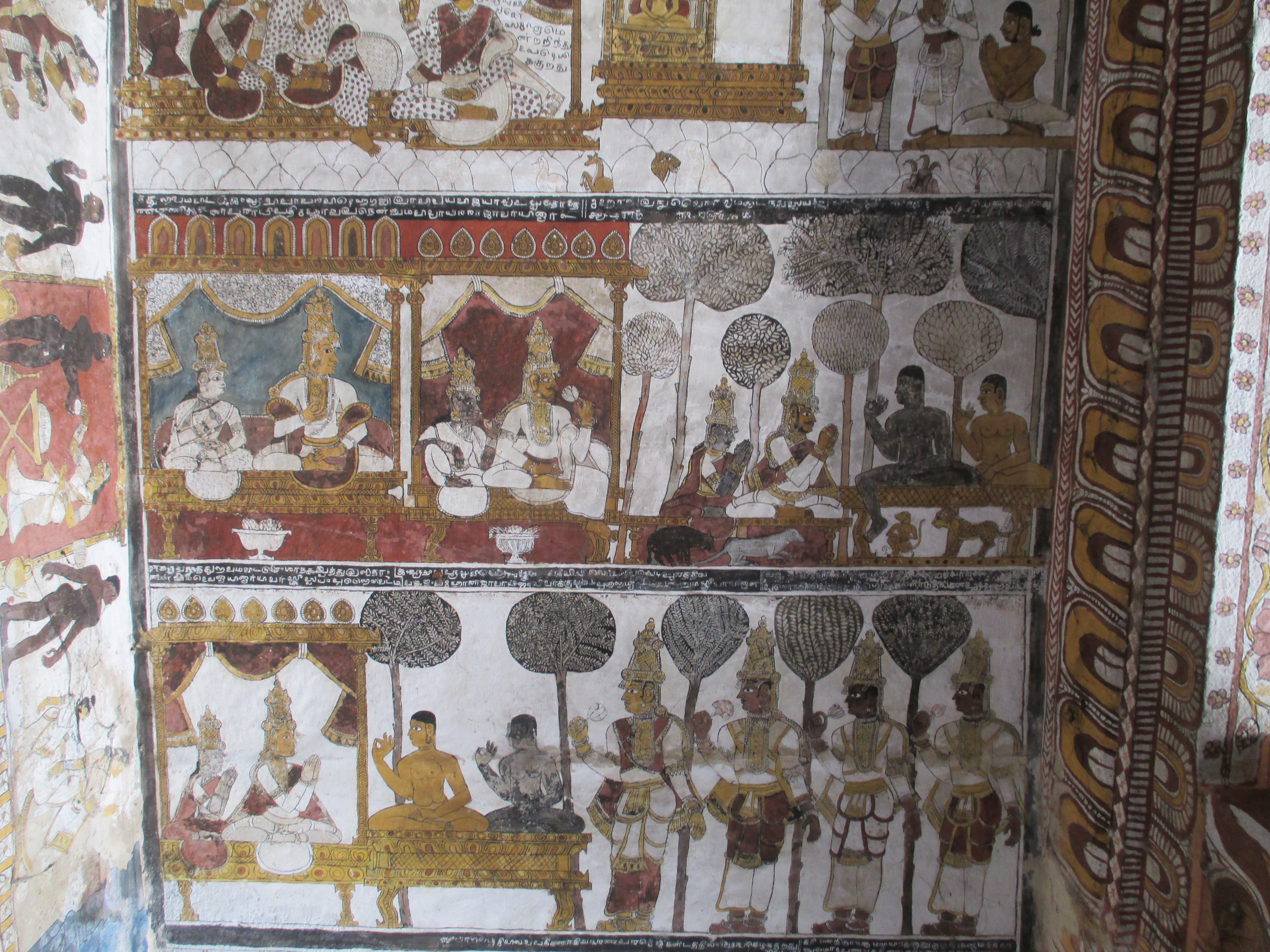
Painted ceiling with Jain munis

Kanchipuram had been a major center of Jainism and is associated with several well-known Jain Acharyas like Samantabhadra and Akalanka. It is thought that Jainism was introduced into Kanchipuram by Kunda Kundacharya (1st century). Jainism spread to the city by Akalanka (3rd century). Kalbhras, the rulers of Kanchipuram before the Pallavas, followed Jainism which gained popularity from royal patronage. The Pallava kings, Simhavishnu, Mahendra Varman and Simhavarman (550–560) followed Jainism, until the advent of Nayanmars and Alvars during the 6th and 7th centuries. Mahendravarman I converted from Jainism to Hinduism under the influence of the Naynamar, Appar, was the turning point in the religious geography. The two sects of Hinduism, Saivism and Vaishnavism were revived under the influence of Adi Sankara and Ramanuja respectively. Later Cholas and Vijayanagara kings tolerated Jainism, and the religion was still practised in Kanchi.

The original set of the Jina Kanchi institution Mutt was in Kanchipuram. Its original site is now represented by the Trilokyanatha/Chandraprabha temple at Thiruparthikundram. It is a twin Jain temple that has inscriptions from Pallava king, Narasimhavarman II and the Chola kings Rajendra Chola I, Kulothunga Chola I and Vikrama Chola, and the Kanarese inscriptions of Krishnadevaraya. The temple is maintained by Tamil Nadu archaeological department. The Jina Kanchi Mutt was later shifted to Melsithamur, near Gingee in the Villupuram district in the 16th century. There exist many historical Jain sites in the vicinity of Kanchipuram in several villages that still have some Jain population.

=== Other religions ===
The city has two mosques; one near the Ekambareswarar temple, was built during the rule of Nawab of Arcot in the 17th century, and another near the Vaikunta Perumal temple, shares a common tank with the Hindu temple. Muslims take part in the festivals of the Varadharaja (Swamy) temple. Christ Church is the oldest Christian church in the city. It was built by a British man named Mclean in 1921. The church is built in Scottish style brick structure with arches and pillars.

== See also ==
- Kammavarpalayam
- Murugan Temple, Saluvankuppam
- Akkur, Tiruvannamalai

== Notes ==
=== Footnotes ===
- The official spelling, as per the municipality website, is "Kancheepuram".
