= Kanchipuram district =

- District of Tamil Nadu
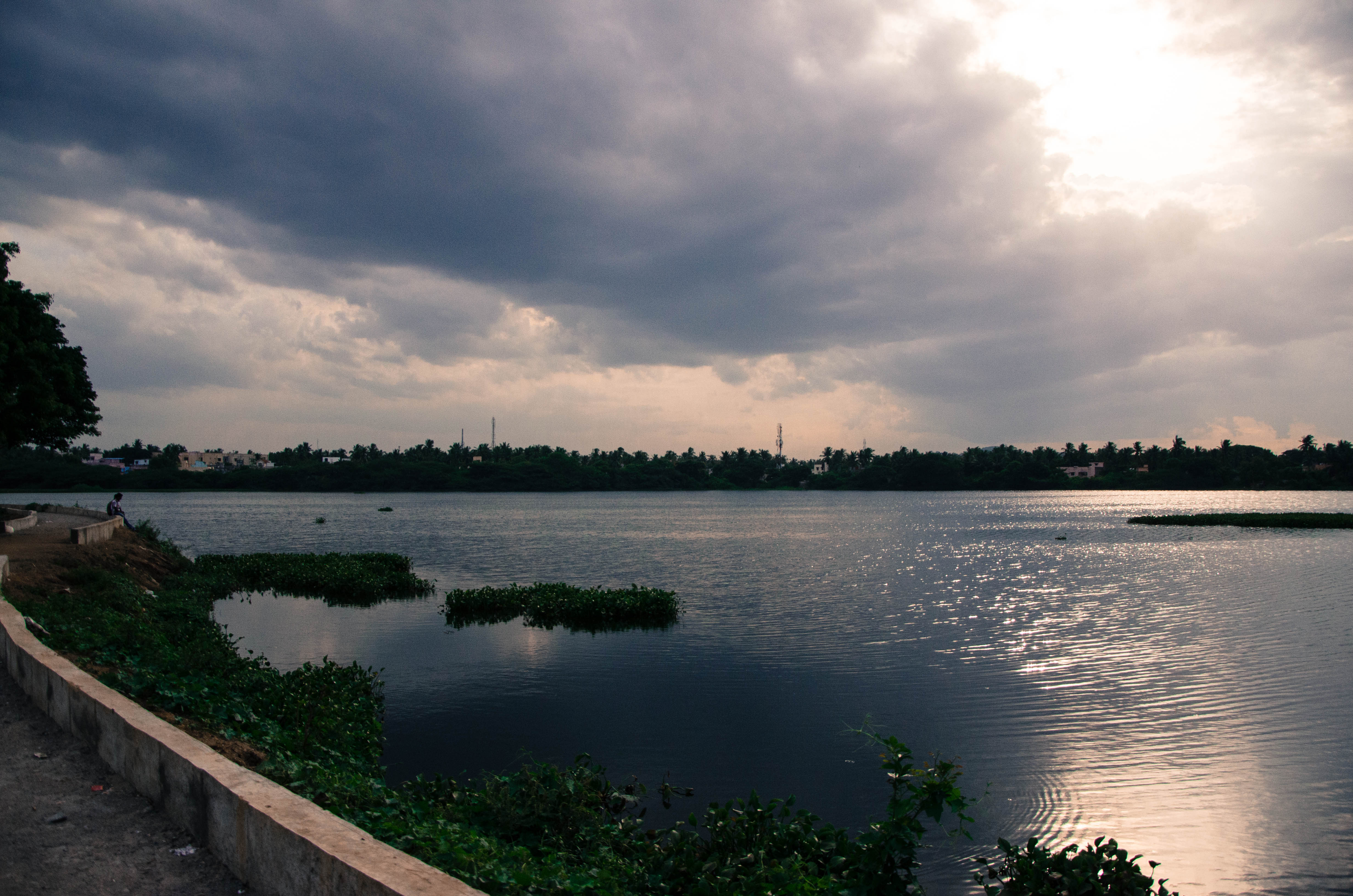
- Waters of Chembarambakkam Lake Chennai limit
- Interactive map of Kanchipuram district
- Coordinates: 12.82°N 79.71°E
- Country: India
- State: Tamil Nadu
- Established: 1 July 1997
- Founder: M. Karunanidhi
- Headquarters: Kanchipuram
- Taluks: Kancheepuram, Sriperumbudur, Uthiramerur, Walajabad, Kundrathur

Government
  - District Collector: Sneha D I.A.S

Area
  - Total: 1,655.94 km^{2} (639.36 sq mi)

Population (2011)
  - Total: 1,166,401
  - Estimate (2020): 2,468,391
  - Density: 704.374/km^{2} (1,824.32/sq mi)

Languages
  - Official: Tamil
- Time zone: UTC+5:30 (IST)
- PIN: 631 501
- Telephone code: 044
- ISO 3166 code: ?
- Vehicle registration: TN-21, TN-87
- Nominal GDP(2022-23): ₹92,456.43 crore (US$11.76 billion)
- Coastline: 0 kilometres (0 mi)
- Largest Metro: Kanchipuram
- Sex ratio: M-50.6%/F-49.4% ♂/♀
- Literacy: 75.34%
- Legislature type: elected
- Legislature Strength: 3
- Lok Sabha constituency: Kancheepuram (SC), Sriperumbudur
- Precipitation: 1,213 millimetres (47.8 in)
- Avg. summer temperature: 36.6 °C (97.9 °F)
- Avg. winter temperature: 19.8 °C (67.6 °F)
- Website: kancheepuram.nic.in

Kanchipuram district is one of the 38 districts in the state of Tamil Nadu in India. The area comprising the present day Kancheepuram district was earlier a part of Chingleput district. The original Chingleput district was split in 1997 into form the present day Kanchipuram and Tiruvallur districts. The district headquarters is Kanchipuram.

On 18 July 2019, Chengalpattu district was carved out of Kanchipuram district, with suburbs from Chengalpet towards Chennai under the district headquarters in Chengalpet. The separation came into effect from 29 November which was done by former Chief Minister Mr. Edappadi K Palaniswami.

== Geography ==
Kanchipuram district is situated on the North Eastern part of Tamil Nadu. It is bounded by Chengalpattu district in the East, Chennai district in the northeast, Ranipet and Tiruvannamalai districts in the west and Thiruvallur district in the north. It lies between 11° 00' to 12° 00' latitudes and 77° 28' to 78° 50' longitudes. The district has a total geographical area of 4,43,210 hectares.

The table below shows the maximum and minimum temperatures experienced in the district during different seasons.

	Summer	Winter
Max.	38.5 °C (101.3 °F)	27.7 °C (81.9 °F)
Min.	29.1 °C (84.4 °F)	19.0 °C (66.2 °F)

Northeast and Southwest monsoon are the major donors, with 54% and 36% contribution each to the total annual rainfall. During normal monsoon, the district receives a rainfall of 1200 mm.

The Palar river is the most important river running through the district. Through most of the year it remains dry, attributed to the construction of dams across the river in Andhra Pradesh. There are only a few hills of considerable elevation in the district. The southern part of Maduranthakam taluk contains small hills. The total forest area in the district is 23,586 hectares.

=== Climate ===
Climate data for Chennai (Nungambakkam; rainfall from Chennai Airport), 1991–2020 normals, extremes 1901–present
Month	Jan	Feb	Mar	Apr	May	Jun	Jul	Aug	Sep	Oct	Nov	Dec	Year
Record high °C (°F)	34.4 (93.9)	36.7 (98.1)	40.6 (105.1)	42.8 (109.0)	45.0 (113.0)	43.3 (109.9)	41.1 (106.0)	40.0 (104.0)	38.9 (102.0)	39.4 (102.9)	35.4 (95.7)	33.0 (91.4)	45.0 (113.0)
Mean daily maximum °C (°F)	29.3 (84.7)	30.9 (87.6)	32.9 (91.2)	34.5 (94.1)	37.1 (98.8)	37.0 (98.6)	35.3 (95.5)	34.7 (94.5)	34.2 (93.6)	32.1 (89.8)	29.9 (85.8)	28.9 (84.0)	33.1 (91.6)
Daily mean °C (°F)	25.4 (77.7)	26.7 (80.1)	28.7 (83.7)	31.0 (87.8)	33.0 (91.4)	32.3 (90.1)	31.0 (87.8)	30.3 (86.5)	29.8 (85.6)	28.5 (83.3)	26.7 (80.1)	25.6 (78.1)	29.1 (84.4)
Mean daily minimum °C (°F)	21.2 (70.2)	22.2 (72.0)	24.2 (75.6)	26.6 (79.9)	28.0 (82.4)	27.5 (81.5)	26.4 (79.5)	25.9 (78.6)	25.6 (78.1)	24.6 (76.3)	23.1 (73.6)	21.9 (71.4)	24.8 (76.6)
Record low °C (°F)	13.9 (57.0)	15.0 (59.0)	16.7 (62.1)	20.0 (68.0)	21.1 (70.0)	20.6 (69.1)	21.0 (69.8)	20.5 (68.9)	20.6 (69.1)	16.7 (62.1)	15.0 (59.0)	13.9 (57.0)	13.9 (57.0)
Average rainfall mm (inches)	20.0 (0.79)	4.7 (0.19)	3.4 (0.13)	17.5 (0.69)	49.7 (1.96)	75.4 (2.97)	113.1 (4.45)	141.4 (5.57)	143.9 (5.67)	278.3 (10.96)	377.3 (14.85)	183.7 (7.23)	1,408.4 (55.45)
Average rainy days	1.4	0.6	0.2	1.0	1.8	4.5	6.7	8.8	7.4	10.6	11.5	5.7	60.2
Average relative humidity (%) (at 17:30 IST)	67	66	67	70	68	63	65	66	71	76	76	71	69
Mean monthly sunshine hours	232.5	240.1	291.4	294.0	300.7	234.0	142.6	189.1	195.0	257.3	261.0	210.8	2,848.5
Mean daily sunshine hours	7.5	8.5	9.4	9.8	9.7	7.8	4.6	6.1	6.5	8.3	8.7	6.8	7.8
Percentage possible sunshine	82	91	87	82	72	54	46	48	54	52	46	62	64
Average ultraviolet index	10	11	12	12	12	12	12	12	11	11	10	9	11
Source 1: India Meteorological Department
Source 2: Tokyo Climate Center (mean temperatures 1991–2020)

== Administrative divisions ==
- Municipal corporation – 1
- Municipalities – 2
- Town Panchayats – 3
- District panchayat wards – 9
- Panchayat unions – 5
- Village panchayat wards – 274

=== Revenue divisions and taluks ===
Kancheepuram District consists of two revenue divisions and five taluks:

- Sriperumbudur Revenue Division – Sriperumbudur taluk, Kundrathur taluk
- Kanchipuram Revenue Division – Kanchipuram taluk, Walajabad taluk, Uthiramerur taluk

=== Municipal corporation ===
- Kancheepuram

=== Municipalities ===
- Kundrathur
- Mangadu

=== Proposed municipalities ===
- Sriperumbudur
- Iyyapanthangal
- Gerugambakkam
- Walajabad

=== Town panchayats ===
- Sriperumbudur
- Uthiramerur
- Walajabad

=== Proposed town panchayats ===
- Thirumudivakkam
- Padappai
- Oragadam
- Maduramangalam

=== Panchayat unions / blocks ===
- Kanchipuram
- Walajabad
- Uthiramerur
- Sriperumbudur
- Kundrathur

== Demographics ==
Historical population
Year	Pop.	±% p.a.
1901	708,782	—
1911	759,794	+0.70%
1921	798,408	+0.50%
1931	871,546	+0.88%
1941	956,996	+0.94%
1951	1,030,559	+0.74%
1961	1,167,491	+1.26%
1971	1,499,744	+2.54%
1981	1,898,021	+2.38%
1991	2,415,010	+2.44%
2001	2,877,468	+1.77%
2011	3,998,252	+3.34%

According to 2011 census, Kancheepuram district had a population of 3,998,252 with a sex-ratio of 986 females for every 1,000 males, much above the national average of 929. A total of 431,574 were under the age of six, constituting 220,341 males and 211,233 females. Scheduled Castes and Scheduled Tribes accounted for 23.71% and 1.03% of the population respectively. The average literacy of the district was 75.37%, compared to the national average of 72.99%. The district had a total of 1,006,245 households. There were a total of 1,673,814 workers, comprising 74,761 cultivators, 162,494 main agricultural labourers, 41,149 in house hold industries, 1,088,974 other workers, 306,436 marginal workers, 14,582 marginal cultivators, 110,020 marginal agricultural labourers, 13,583 marginal workers in household industries and 168,251 other marginal workers.

== Politics ==
District	No.	Constituency	Name	Party	Alliance	Remarks
Kanchipuram	29	Sriperumbudur (SC)	Thennarasu. K.	TVK	TVK+	Cabinet Minister
Vacant				On 25 May 2026, resigned from office and officially joined TVK		
Kanchipuram	36	Uthiramerur	J. Munirathinam	TVK	TVK+	
Kanchipuram	37	Kancheepuram	R. V. Ranjithkumar	TVK	TVK+	Cabinet Minister

== Economy ==
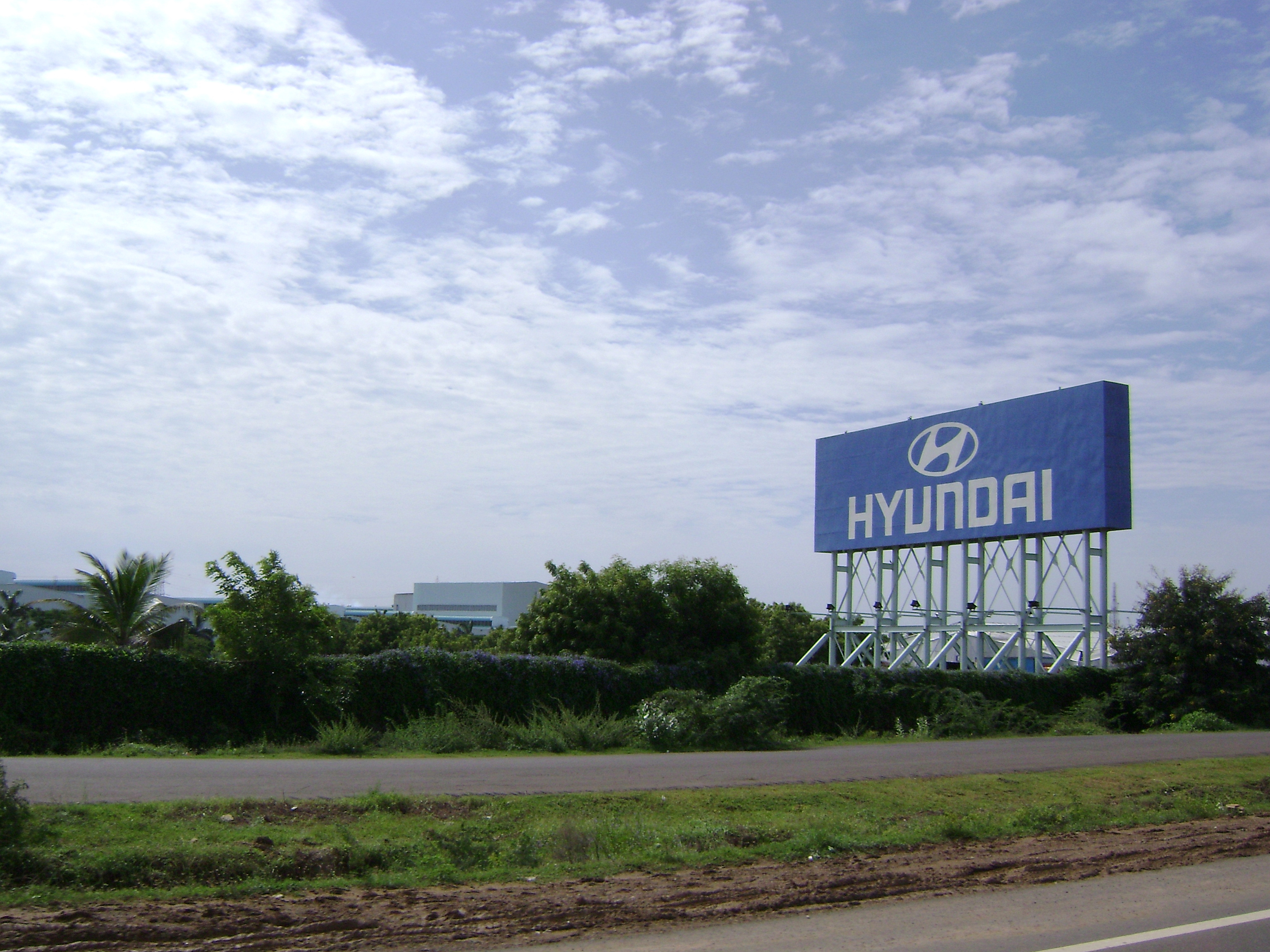
Hyundai's manufacturing plant at Irungattukottai, near Sriperumbudur

Agriculture is the main occupation of the people with 47% of the population engaged in it. Paddy is the major crop cultivated in this district. Groundnuts, sugarcane, cereals, millet and pulses are the other major crops cultivated. 76.50 metric tonnes lands are cultivated in fuel wood and 8.039 tonnes in cashew. Palar river along with tanks and wells are the main sources of irrigation in this district.

More than 70 percent of the 163 notified areas (megalithic sites) in the state of Tamil Nadu are in Kancheepuram district, including those at Erumaiyur, Nandampakkam, Sirukalathur, Sikarayapuram, Ayyancheri, Kilambakkam and Nanmangalam.

== See also ==
- List of districts of Tamil Nadu
- Thenambakkam
