= 1971 Indian general election in Tamil Nadu =

Indian general election in Tamil Nadu

Indian general election in Tamil Nadu, 1971
- November 1971

39 (of 518) seats in the Lok Sabha
- Registered: 23,064,983
- Turnout: 16,565,949 (71.82%) ▼4.74%
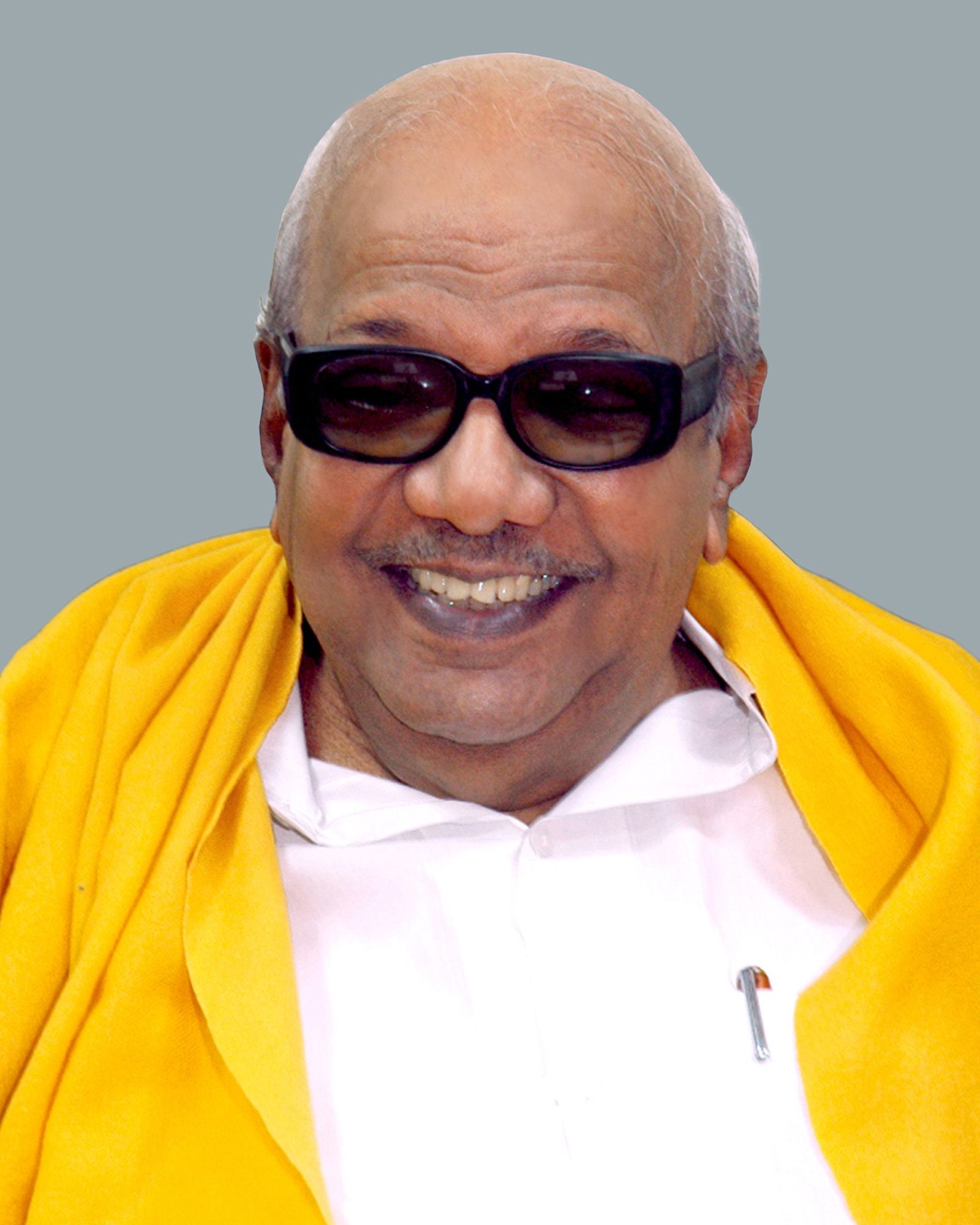

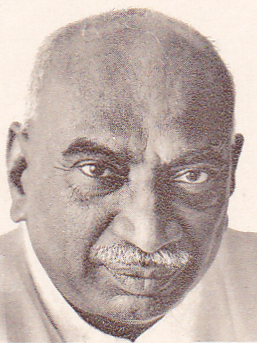
	First party	Second party
Leader	M. Karunanidhi	K. Kamaraj
Party	DMK	INC(O)
Alliance	Progressive Front	Democratic Front
Leader's seat	Did not contest	Nagercoil
Seats won	38	1
Seat change	▲9	▼5
Popular vote	8,869,095	6,474,832
Percentage	55.60%	40.60%
Swing	▲31.44%	▼24.73%
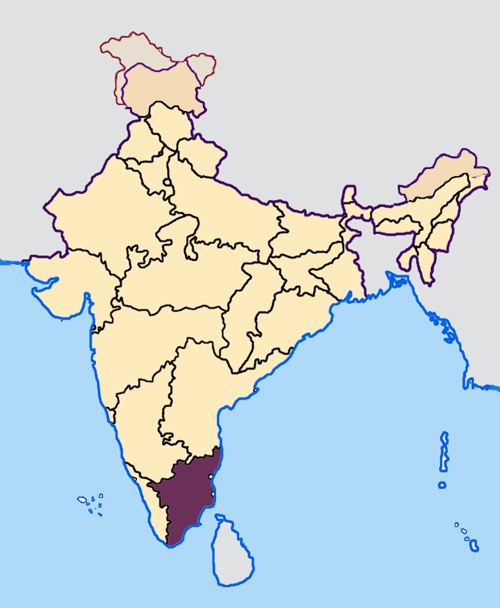
- Tamil Nadu
Prime Minister before election
Indira Gandhi
INC(R)
Prime Minister after election
Indira Gandhi
INC(R)

The 1971 Indian general election polls in Tamil Nadu were held for 39 seats in the state. After winning in 1967, DMK supported the Congress party under Indira Gandhi, and the 25 DMK MPs, ensured her to stay in power as a minority government, from 1969 to 1971. This state was crucial for Indira Gandhi to hold, in order for her to stay in power. The result was a victory for Indian National Congress (Indira) and its ally Dravida Munnetra Kazhagam winning 38 seats (with 5 seats going to the Left Front), while Opposition Congress and Swatantra Party could only win 1 seat. DMK won every seat it contested except the seat contested by K. Kamarajar in Nagercoil.

== Seat Allotment ==
=== Progressive Front ===
No.	Party	Election Symbol	Leader	Seats
1.	Dravida Munnetra Kazhagam		M. Karunanidhi	24
2.	Indian National Congress (R)		Indira Gandhi	9
3.	Communist Party of India		M. Kalyanasundaram	4
4.	All India Forward Bloc		P. K. Mookiah Thevar	1
5.	Indian Union Muslim League (Note: Scales Symbol was Independent Symbol throughout India, except Punjab in 1971 elections.)		Muhammed Ismail	1

=== Democratic Front ===
No.	Party	Election Symbol	Leader	Seats
1.	Indian National Congress (Organization)		K. Kamaraj	29
2.	Swatantra Party		C. Rajagopalachari	9
3.	Samyukta Socialist Party		George Fernandes	1

== List of Candidates ==
Constituency		DMK+		INC(O)+	
#	Name	Party	Candidate	Party	Candidate
1	Madras North	DMK	Nanjil K. Manoharan	INC(O)	S. G. Vinayagamoorthy
2	Madras South	DMK	Murasoli Maran	SWA	Narasimhan
3	Sriperumbudur (SC)	DMK	T. S. Latchumanan	INC(O)	P. Kakkan
4	Chingleput	DMK	C. Chittibabu	INC(O)	P. M. Muthukumarappa
5	Tiruttani	INC(R)	O. V. Alagesan	INC(O)	P. Ramachandran
6	Vellore (SC)	DMK	R. P. Ulaganambi	INC(O)	T. Manavalan
7	Tiruppattur	DMK	C. K. Chinnaraji Gounder	SWA	N. Parthasarathy
8	Wandiwash	DMK	G. Viswanathan	INC(O)	A. Krishnaswamy
9	Tindivanam	INC(R)	M. R. Lakshminarayanan	SWA	M. P. Radhakrishnan
10	Cuddalore	INC(R)	S. Radhakrishnan	INC(O)	R. Muthukumaran
11	Chidambaram (SC)	DMK	V. Mayavan	INC(O)	L. Elayaperumal
12	Kallakurichi	DMK	M. Devekan	INC(O)	K. Veerasamy
13	Krishnagiri	INC(R)	T. Thirthagiri Gounder	SWA	T. M. Thirupathy
14	Salem	DMK	E. R. Krishnan	INC(O)	M. P. Subramanyam
15	Mettur	INC(R)	G. Bhuvarahan	INC(O)	K. Ramamurthy
16	Tiruchengode	DMK	M. Muthusami	INC(O)	T. M. Kaliyannan
17	Nilgiris	DMK	J. Matha Gowder	INC(O)	Akkamma Devi
18	Coimbatore	CPI	K. Balathandayutham	INC(O)	Ramaswamy
19	Pollachi	DMK	Narayanan	SSP	K. R. Nallasivam
20	Dharapuram (SC)	DMK	C. T. Dhandapani	INC(O)	K. Paramalai
21	Gobichettipalayam	DMK	P. A. Saminathan	INC(O)	E. V. K. Sampath
22	Periakulam	IND	S. M. Mohammed Sheriff	SWA	Ajmalkhan
23	Dindigul	DMK	M. Rajangam	SWA	K. Chemachamy
24	Madurai	INC(R)	R. V. Swaminathan	INC(O)	S. Chinna Karuppa Thevar
25	Karur	INC(R)	Gopal	INC(O)	V. Ramanathan
26	Tiruchirappalli	CPI	M. Kalyanasundaram	INC(O)	S. P. Thangavelu
27	Perambalur (SC)	DMK	A. Durairasu	INC(O)	M. Ayyakunnu
28	Pudukkottai	DMK	K. Veeriah	INC(O)	R. Vijaya Reghunatha
29	Kumbakonam	DMK	Era Sezhiyan	INC(O)	C. Ramaswamy
30	Mayuram (SC)	DMK	K. Subravelu	INC(O)	K. Rajangam
31	Nagapattinam	CPI	M. Kathamuthu	INC(O)	V. Sabasivam
32	Thanjavur	DMK	S. D. Somasundaram	INC(O)	R. Krishnasamy Gopalar
33	Sivaganga	DMK	Tha. Kiruttinan	INC(O)	Kannappa Valliappan
34	Ramanathapuram	AIFB	P. K. Mookiah Thevar	INC(O)	S. Balakrishnan
35	Sivakasi	INC(R)	V. Jeyalakshmi	SWA	R. Gopalakrishnan
36	Tirunelveli	CPI	S. A. Muruganantham	SWA	S. Palaniswaminathan
37	Tenkasi (SC)	INC(R)	A. M. Cnellachami	INC(O)	R. S. Arumugam
38	Tiruchendur	DMK	M. S. Sivasami	SWA	M. Mathias
39	Nagercoil	DMK	M. C. Balan	INC(O)	K. Kamaraj

== Voting and results ==
Alliance	Party	Popular Vote	Percentage	Swing	Seats won	Seat Change
Progressive Front	Dravida Munnetra Kazhagam	5,622,758	35.25%	▼0.53%	23	▼2
Progressive Front	Indian National Congress (Requistionist)	1,995,567	12.51%	▼29.18%	9	▲6
Progressive Front	Communist Party of India	866,399	5.43%	▲3.74%	4	▲4
Progressive Front	All India Forward Bloc	208,431	1.31%		1	
Progressive Front	Independents	175,940	1.10%	▼0.07%	1	Steady
Progressive Front	Total	8,869,095	55.60%	▼24.73%	38	▲9
Democratic Front	Indian National Congress (Organisation)	4,853,534	30.43%	new party	1	new party
Democratic Front	Swatantra Party	1,479,693	9.28%	▲0.12%	0	▼6
Democratic Front	Samyukta Socialist Party	141,605	0.89%	new party	0	new party
Democratic Front	Total	6,474,832	40.60%	▲31.44%	1	▼5
Communist Party of India (Marxist)		260,833	1.64%	▼5.21%	0	▼4
Independents		344,452	2.16%	▼1.00%	0	Steady
Total		15,949,212	100.00%	Steady	39	Steady
Valid Votes		15,949,212	96.28%			
Invalid Votes		616,437	3.72%			
Total Votes		16,565,649	100.00%			
Registered Voters/Turnout		23,064,983	71.82%	▼4.74%		

== List of Elected MPs ==
Constituency		Winner				Runner Up				Margin	%
#	Name	Candidate	Party	Votes	%	Candidate	Party	Votes	%	Margin	%
1	Madras North	K. Manoharan	DMK	2,45,401	55.03	S. G. Vinayagamoorthy	INC(O)	1,93,807	43.46	51,594	11.57
2	Madras South	Murasoli Maran	DMK	2,53,626	52.09	Nara Simhan	SWA	2,33,285	47.91	20,341	4.18
3	Sriperumbudur (SC)	T. S. Latchumanan	DMK	3,00,663	59.98	P. Kakkan	INC(O)	2,00,617	40.02	1,00,046	19.96
4	Chingleput	C. Chittibabu	DMK	2,51,687	60.02	P. M. Muthukumarappa	INC(O)	1,32,931	31.70	1,18,756	28.32
5	Tiruttani	O. V. Alagesa Mudaliar	INC	2,41,418	60.55	P. Ramachandran	INC(O)	1,57,313	39.45	84,105	21.10
6	Vellore (SC)	R. P. Ulaganambi	DMK	2,21,512	57.13	T. Manavalan	INC(O)	1,36,191	35.12	85,321	22.01
7	Tiruppattur	C. K. Chinnaraji Gounder	DMK	2,07,562	57.65	N. Parthasarathy	SWA	1,52,499	42.35	55,063	15.30
8	Wandiwash	G. Viswanathan	DMK	2,30,003	57.49	A. Krishnaswamy	INC(O)	1,42,048	35.51	87,955	21.98
9	Tindivanam	M. R. Lakshminarayanan	INC	2,12,309	55.92	M. P. Radhakrishnan	SWA	1,50,834	39.73	61,475	16.19
10	Cuddalore	S. Radhakrishnan	INC	2,29,934	54.31	R. Muthukumaran	INC(O)	1,93,447	45.69	36,487	8.62
11	Chidambaram (SC)	V. Mayavan	DMK	2,03,059	51.09	L. Elayaperumal	INC(O)	1,80,661	45.46	22,398	5.63
12	Kallakurichi	M. Devekan	DMK	2,07,721	52.79	K. Veerasamy	INC(O)	1,85,745	47.21	21,976	5.58
13	Krishnagiri	T. Thirthagiri Gounder	INC	1,86,114	55.18	T. M. Thirupathy	SWA	1,51,194	44.82	34,920	10.36
14	Salem	E. R. Krishnan	DMK	2,30,736	55.87	M. P. Subramanyam	INC(O)	1,75,940	42.60	54,796	13.27
15	Mettur	G. Bhuvarahan	INC	2,01,744	59.80	K. Ramamurthy	INC(O)	1,35,604	40.20	66,140	19.60
16	Tiruchengode	M. Muthusami	DMK	2,38,746	55.83	T. M. Kaliyannan	INC(O)	1,78,699	41.79	60,047	14.04
17	Nilgiris	J. Matha Gowder	DMK	2,15,654	58.25	Akkamma Devi	INC(O)	1,54,560	41.75	61,094	16.50
18	Coimbatore	K. Balathandayutham	CPI	2,14,824	53.05	Ramaswamy	INC(O)	1,37,771	34.02	77,053	19.03
19	Pollachi	Narayanan	DMK	2,67,811	64.66	K. R. Nallasivam	SSP	1,41,605	34.19	1,26,206	30.47
20	Dharapuram (SC)	C. T. Dhandapani	DMK	2,60,113	64.38	K. Paramalai	INC(O)	1,43,927	35.62	1,16,186	28.76
21	Gobichettipalayam	P. A. Saminathan	DMK	2,19,662	57.98	E. V. K. Sampath	INC(O)	1,59,170	42.02	60,492	15.96
22	Periakulam	S. M. Mohammed Sheriff	IND	1,75,940	45.29	Ajmalkhan	SWA	1,34,015	34.50	41,925	10.79
23	Dindigul	M. Rajangam	DMK	2,48,638	59.88	K. Chemachamy	SWA	1,51,003	36.36	97,635	23.52
24	Madurai	R. V. Swaminathan	INC	2,27,060	51.04	S. Chinna Karuppa Thevar	INC(O)	1,54,701	34.77	72,359	16.27
25	Karur	Gopal	INC	2,38,315	59.09	V. Ramanathan	INC(O)	1,65,022	40.91	73,293	18.18
26	Tiruchirappalli	M. Kalyanasundaram	CPI	2,17,677	49.34	S. P. Thangavelu	INC(O)	1,97,127	44.69	20,550	4.65
27	Perambalur (SC)	A. Durairasu	DMK	2,58,724	56.75	M. Ayyakunnu	INC(O)	1,97,155	43.25	61,569	13.50
28	Pudukkottai	K. Veeriah	DMK	2,51,861	55.31	R. Vijaya Reghunatha	INC(O)	2,03,466	44.69	48,395	10.62
29	Kumbakonam	Era Sezhiyan	DMK	2,42,547	54.34	C. R. Ramasamy	INC(O)	2,03,794	45.66	38,753	8.68
30	Mayuram (SC)	K. Subravelu	DMK	2,07,304	53.84	K. Rajangam	INC(O)	1,40,931	36.60	66,373	17.24
31	Nagapattinam	M. Kathamuthu	CPI	2,19,684	54.95	V. Sabasivam	INC(O)	1,31,957	33.00	87,727	21.95
32	Thanjavur	S. D. Somasundaram	DMK	2,68,980	57.31	R. Krishnasamy Gopalar	INC(O)	1,68,972	36.00	1,00,008	21.31
33	Sivaganga	Tha Kiruttinan	DMK	2,73,194	61.21	Kannappa Valliappan	INC(O)	1,73,106	38.79	1,00,088	22.42
34	Ramanathapuram	P. K. Mookkiah Thevar	FBL	2,08,431	58.16	S. Balakrishnan	INC(O)	1,39,276	38.87	69,155	19.29
35	Sivakasi	V. Jeyalakshmi	INC	2,35,491	59.67	R. Gopalakrishnan	SWA	1,49,829	37.96	85,662	21.71
36	Tirunelveli	S. A. Muruganantham	CPI	2,14,214	56.26	S. Palaniswaminathan	SWA	1,54,277	40.52	59,937	15.74
37	Tenkasi (SC)	A. M. Cnellachami	INC	2,23,182	55.48	R. S. Arumugam	INC(O)	1,54,272	38.35	68,910	17.13
38	Tiruchendur	M. S. Sivasamy	DMK	2,02,783	49.29	M. Mathias	SWA	2,02,757	49.29	26	0.00
39	Nagercoil	K. Kamaraj Nadar	INC(O)	2,15,324	58.37	M. C. Balan	DMK	1,14,771	31.11	1,00,553	27.26

== See also ==
- Elections in Tamil Nadu
