= J. Munirathinam =

Indian politician (born 1983)

Janakiraman Munirathinam (born 1983) is an Indian politician from Tamil Nadu. He is a member of the Tamil Nadu Legislative Assembly from Uthiramerur Assembly constituency in Kanchipuram district representing Tamilaga Vettri Kazhagam.

== Early life ==
Munirathinam is from Sriprerumbudur, Tamil Nadu. He is the son of A.Janakiraman. He is the only MLA with disability elected to the house. He is a member of the Vijay Makkal Iyakkam since 2009. He used callipers and campaigned in his constituency. He completed his B.B.A. in May 2007 at University of Madras and later did L.L.B. at Sri Venkateswara College of Law, Tirupati in 2014. He is a builder and developer. He declared assets worth Rs.38 crore in his affidavit to the Election Commission of India.

== Career ==
Munirathinam became an MLA for the first time winning the 2026 Tamil Nadu Legislative Assembly election from Uthiramerur Assembly constituency representing Tamilaga Vettri Kazhagam. He polled 84,917 and defeated his nearest rival and five time MLA, K. Sundar of Dravida Munnetra Kazhagam, by a margin of 14,223 votes.
