= S. Jagathrakshakan =

Indian politician

Dr. S. Jagathrakshakan
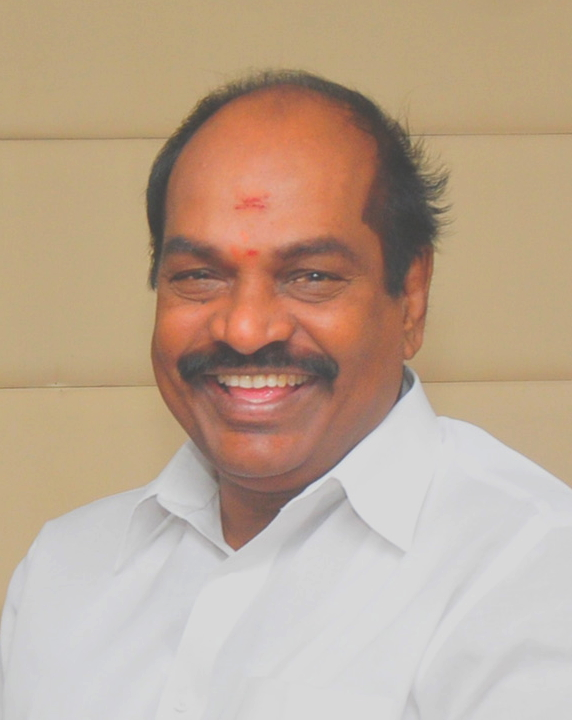

Member of Parliament, Lok Sabha
- Incumbent
- Assumed office 23 May 2019
- Preceded by: G. Hari
- Constituency: Arakkonam
- In office 16 May 2009 – 16 May 2014
- Preceded by: R. Velu
- Succeeded by: G. Hari
- Constituency: Arakkonam
- In office 6 October 1999 – 16 May 2004
- Preceded by: C. Gopal Mudaliyar
- Succeeded by: R. Velu
- Constituency: Arakkonam
- In office 1984–1989
- Preceded by: Era. Anbarasu
- Succeeded by: Kanchi Panneerselvam
- Constituency: Chengalpattu

Minister of State, New & Renewable Energy, Commerce and Industry, Government of India
- In office 2012–2013

Minister of State, Information and Broadcasting, Government of India
- In office 2009–2012

Member of Tamil Nadu Legislative Assembly
- In office 1980–1984
- Preceded by: S. Pakkur Subramanyan
- Succeeded by: K. Narasimma Pallavan
- Constituency: Uthiramerur

Personal details
- Born: 6 February 1948 (age 78) Kalingamalai, Villupuram district, Madras Presidency, India
- Party: Dravida Munnetra Kazhagam
- Other political affiliations: All India Anna Dravida Munnetra Kazhagam
- Spouse: Anusuya (m. 1973)
- Children: 2

S. Jagathrakshakan (born 6 February 1948, in Kalingamalai, Villupuram district in Tamil Nadu) is an Indian Tamil businessman and politician. He did his matriculation at Valudavur. He is a member of Lok Sabha of India from Arakkonam constituency of Tamil Nadu and has been elected from this constituency thrice since 1999. He was the minister of state for commerce and industry from November 2012 to March 2013. He is also the chairman of Shree Balaji Medical College and Hospital. He is the owner of Dr. Rela Hospital and Institute. He has authored 30 books, one of which was released by Mother Teresa.

In his political career, Jagathrakshakan has been elected once to the Tamil Nadu state assembly during the 1980 elections and to the Lok Sabha during the 1984 elections from the All India Anna Dravida Munnetra Kazhagam (AIADMK) party. He also headed the AIADMK parliamentary party from 1985–89. He won the Arakkonam Lok Sabha constituency during 1999 and 2009 elections from the Dravida Munnetra Kazhagam (DMK) party. He started a Vanniyar (Vanniyar Kula Sathriyan) caste based party called Veera Vanniyar Peravai in 2004, which became Jananayaga Munnetra Kazhagam in August 2004 and merged with DMK in 2009.

Jagathrakshakan has been a centre of controversy in various issues like Coal scam exposed in March 2012 where he is alleged to have utilized his political clout for illegal coal allocation for his company in 2007. He is believed to have amassed assets from 5 Crore in 2009 to 70 crores in 2011, which is the highest percentage rise of assets among all ministers in the central cabinet. In a sting operation conducted in June 2009, it was exposed that one of his medical colleges collected 20 lakh rupees for MBBS. He is said to be main power house of funds for elections held for DMK to contest in those . He was elected to the Lok Sabha from Arakkonam Lok Sabha constituency as part of the Dravida Munnetra Kazhagam (DMK) in the 2019 Indian general election and 2024 Indian general election.

== Career ==
Jagathrakshakan was first elected to the Tamil Nadu assembly in 1980 when he contested from Uthiramerur as a candidate of Anna Dravida Munnetra Kazhagam (ADMK) under the leadership of MG Ramachandran. He is one of the first political leaders to establish a professional college. He started the Bharath Institute of Science and Technology in 1984, which later went on to become Bharath University in 2003. The branches of the college were opened in Puducherry and Tamil Nadu.

He was first elected to the Lok Sabha in 1985 from Arakkonam constituency and he served as the leader of ADMK parliamentary Party. After MGR's death, he sided the ADMK faction headed by MGR's wife Janaki and R.M.Veerappan. He contested from Uthiramerur constituency in 1989 state assembly elections ending up with fourth position. During the 1999 parliamentary elections, he got a Dravida Munnetra Kazhagam (DMK) ticket through R.M.Veerappan's MGR Kazhagam (he also served as the general secretary of that party) and won from Arakkonam constituency. He started a Vanniyar caste based party called Veera Vanniyar Peravai in 2004, which in August 2004, became Jananayaga Munnetra Kazhagam. He supported the Congress-DMK combine during the 2004 general elections, but did not contest. In 2009, he merged the party with DMK. He won the 2009 election from Arakkonam constituency as a candidate of DMK by defeating Pattali Makkal Katchi (PMK) candidate and former Union Minister of State for Railways R. Velu in Arakkonam. He became the minister of state for information and broadcasting and later went on to become the minister of new and renewable energy in November 2012. He did not take charge as a minister and after talks with Karunanidhi, the party chief, he was allocated the portfolio of Commerce and industry on 2 November 2012. DMK pulled out of the ruling UPA on 20 March 2013 following widespread protests in Tamil Nadu against the central government for not taking up the concerns of Tamils in Sri Lanka in the UN resolution against the alleged human rights violation against Tamils by Sri Lankan government. Jagathrakshakan resigned his ministerial post along with other members of the party.

Jagathrakshakan married Anusuya on 9 September 1973 and the pair have a son and a daughter. He has visited and been part of visiting delegation to various countries. His primary interests are providing education to the down-trodden, helping orphans and physically challenged. He started a research organisation called Alwarkal aaiyuvumaiyam dedicated to the promotion of Tamil culture and art. He has authored 30 books, one of which was released by Mother Teresa. His favourite past times include playing volleyball.

=== Foreign direct investment in Sri Lanka ===
In March 2019, Sri Lanka's BOI (Board of Investment) made an announcement regarding a $3.85 billion plan to build an oil refinery in Hambantota. The investor was reported as Silver Park International PTE Ltd registered in Singapore, which has as its Directors Jegath Rakshagan Sundeep Anand, Jagathrakshakan Sri Nisha and Jagathrakshakan Anusuya - the son, daughter and wife of Jagathrakshakan Swamikannu. It was also reported that Jagathrakshakan Swamikannu was a Director of the company from June 2017 to September 2018. Silver Park International Pte Ltd, is said to be investing 70% of the share capital — a total of $1887 million — in the project valued at a total of $3.85 billion. It was also reported that Jagathrakshakan along with his family was in Sri Lanka at the deal signing. This had led to news agencies calling for an explanation from the DMK on the source of funds, especially given Jagathrakshahan's chequered past. On 12 September 2020, Enforcement Directorate seized properties of Jagathrakshakan worth Rs.89.1 crores, due to violation of Foreign Exchange Management Act regulations, in relation to illegal acquisition, holding and transfer of foreign security in Silver Park International PTE Ltd.

The ED has imposed him a penalty of ₹908 crore on 28 Aug 2024.

== Elections contested and positions held ==
Elections	Constituency	Party contested	Result	Vote percentage	Opposition candidate	Opposition party	Opposition vote percentage
1980 Tamil Nadu state assembly election	Uthiramerur	ADMK	Won	48.44	S.Ramadoss	INC	46.67
1984 Indian general election	Chengalpattu	ADMK	Won	54.09	M.V.Ramu	DMK	43.5
1989 Tamil Nadu state assembly election	Uthiramerur	ADMK (Janaki)	Lost	9.89	K. Sundar	DMK	34.71
1999 Indian general election	Arakkonam	DMK	Won	47.72	K. V. Thangkabalu	INC	34.55
2009 Indian general election	Arakkonam	DMK	Won	48.66	R. Velu	PMK	35.79
2014 Indian general election	Sriperumbudur	DMK	Lost	36.4	K. N. Ramachandran	AIADMK	42.21
2019 Indian general election	Arakkonam	DMK	Won	57.06	A. K. Moorthy	PMK	29.14

- 1984: Elected to Tamil Nadu State Assembly for the 1st time;
- 1985-1989: Elected to Lok Sabha (eighth) for the first time; Leader of ADMK Parliamentary party
- 1987–88: Member of committee of official languages
- 1999-2004: Elected to Lok Sabha (thirteenth) for the second time
- 1999-2000: Member of committee of external affairs and human resources development
- 2000 onwards: Member of consultative committee of the ministry of heavy industries and public enterprises
- May 2009: Elected to Lok Sabha (Fifteenth) for the third time
- June 2009-28 October 2012:Minister of State, Information and Broadcasting
- 28 October 2012 – 1 November 2013:Minister of state, New and Renewable energy
- 2 November 2012 – 20 March 2013:Minister of state, Commerce and Industry

== Controversies ==
Jakathrakshakan is alleged to have garnered a distillery license using his political clout during his second tenure as MP in 1999. There were also allegations in the discrepancy of age in his election affidavit and his university website. After becoming a minister of information and broadcasting, there were allegations that he was trying to float a TV channel and an English newspaper, both of which were not established.

=== Multifold increase in personal wealth ===
As per official declaration, his assets have increased from 5 crore in 2009 to 70 crore in 2011. This is the highest percentage rise for property among all ministers in the central cabinet. Jagathrakshakan is the founder of Chennai-based Accord Group with interests in Hospitality, Pharmaceuticals, Liquor Manufacturing, and Education. In education space, he owns various colleges under the trust Bharath Institute of Higher Education and Research (BIHER).

=== Capitation fee sting operation ===
In a sting operation conducted by the Times of India in June 2009, it was exposed that one of the medical colleges founded by him had collected 20 lakh rupees for MBBS admission in violation of Supreme Court order and state legislation.

=== Coal mining scam allegations ===
In September 2012, several news reports alleged that his family is a part of a company named JR Power Gen Pvt Ltd which was awarded a coal block in Orissa in 2007. It was the same company which formed a joint venture with a public sector company, Puducherry Industrial Promotion Development and Investment Corporation (PIPDIC), on 17 January 2007. Barely five days after, PIPDIC was allotted a coal block. According to the MoU, JR Power enjoyed a stake in this allotment. However, JR Power had no expertise in thermal power, iron and steel, or cement, the key sectors for consumption of coal. Later, in 2010, JR Power sold 51% stake to KSK Energy Ventures, an established player with interests in the energy sector. The rights for the use of the coal block thus passed to KSK. Reacting to this, Jagathrakshakan admitted to getting a coal block, and said that, "It is true that we got a coal allocation but it was a sub-contract with Puducherry government and then we gave it away to KSK company. Now, we have got nothing to do with the allocation but if the government wants to take back the allocation it can do so."
