= Grand Alliance =

Grand Alliance may refer to:

- Grand Alliance (1815), an alternative name for the Holy Alliance founded by Tsar Alexander I of Russia
- Grand Alliance (Bangladesh), a coalition government in Bangladesh
- Grand Alliance (1971), a coalition of opposition political parties in India during the 1971 Indian general election.
- Grand Alliance (HDTV), the consortium of companies developing the American HDTV standard
- Grand Alliance (League of Augsburg), a coalition of European nations in the 17th and 18th century
- Second Grand Alliance, a re-formation of the League of Augsburg; see Treaty of The Hague (1701)
- Grand Alliance (Philippines), a historical political coalition in the Philippines led by the Progressive Party
- Grand Alliance (World War II), an alliance of the US, UK, and Soviet Union against Nazi Germany during World War II
- Grand Alliance for Democracy, a coalition of political parties in the Philippines, led by the Nacionalista Party
- Grand Alliance Party, a political party in Sierra Leone
- The Grand Alliance, the third volume of Winston Churchill's The Second World War
- Grand Allies, coal cartel in north-east England, also known as the Grand Alliance

== See also ==
- Great Alliance for Change, a 1998 political party alliance in Colombia
- Mahagathbandhan (disambiguation)
