= Chitti Babu =

Chitti Babu can refer to:

- Chitti Babu (Tamil actor) (1964–2013), Indian comedian, presenter and actor
- Chitti Babu (Telugu actor), Indian film actor and comedian
- Chitti Babu (character), in the Enthiran film series
- Chitti Babu (musician) (1936–1996), Carnatic music veena player and composer from South India
- C. Chittibabu (1935–1977), Indian politician
