= Chengalpattu Lok Sabha constituency =

Defunct parliament constituency in Tamil Nadu, India

Coordinates: 12°41′N 79°59′E

Chengalpattu
- Former Lok Sabha constituency
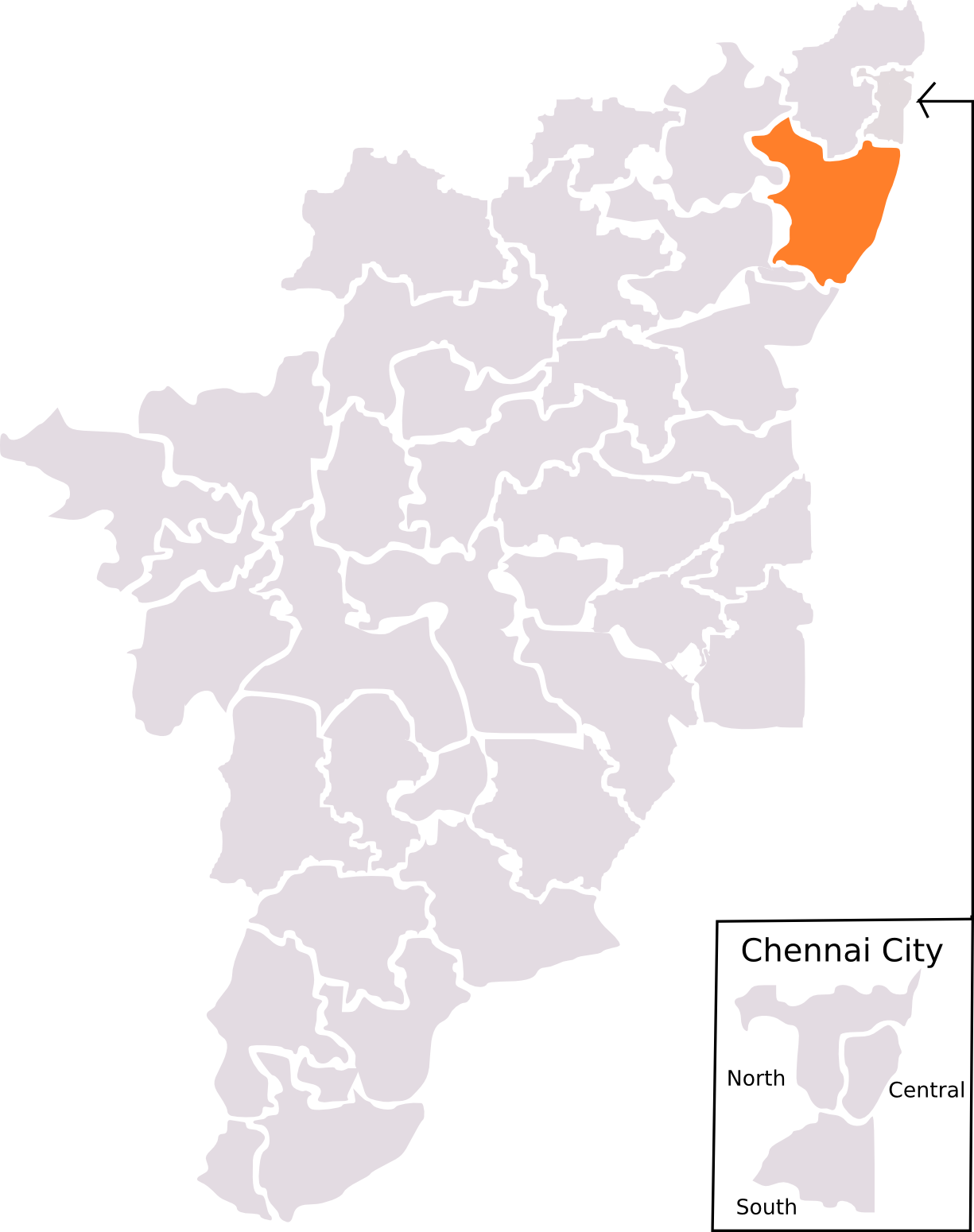
- Sriperumbudur constituency, 1971 delimitation.

Constituency details
- Country: India
- Region: South India
- State: Tamil Nadu
- Assembly constituencies: 1. Tirupporur (SC); 2. Chengalpattu; 3. Maduranthakam; 4. Acharapakkam (SC); 5. Uthiramerur; 6. Kancheepuram
- Established: 1952
- Abolished: 2009
- Total electors: 11,36,736
- Reservation: None

Chengalpattu is a defunct Lok Sabha constituency in Tamil Nadu. It was earlier known as Chingleput. This constituency no longer exists, since it was defunct after 2009, due to delimitation. The region covered by this constituency are now a part of the Kancheepuram (Lok Sabha constituency).

== Assembly segments ==
Chengalpattu Lok Sabha constituency was composed of the following assembly segments:

1. Tirupporur (SC) (moved to Kancheepuram constituency after 2009)
2. Chengalpattu (moved to Kancheepuram constituency after 2009)
3. Maduranthakam (moved to Kancheepuram constituency after 2009)
4. Acharapakkam (SC) (defunct)
5. Uthiramerur (moved to Kancheepuram constituency after 2009)
6. Kancheepuram (moved to Kancheepuram constituency after 2009)

== Members of Parliament ==
Election	Name	Party
1952	O. V. Alagesan	Indian National Congress
1957	N. Sivaraj	Republican Party of India
1957	A. Krishnaswamy	Independent
1962	O. V. Alagesan	Indian National Congress
1967	C. Chittibabu	Dravida Munnetra Kazhagam
1971	C. Chittibabu	Dravida Munnetra Kazhagam
1977	Venkatasubha Reddy	Indian National Congress
1980	Era. Anbarasu	Indian National Congress (I)
1984	S. Jagatrakshakan	All India Anna Dravida Munnetra Kazhagam
1989	Kanchi Panneerselvam	All India Anna Dravida Munnetra Kazhagam
1991	S. S. R. Rajendra Kumar	All India Anna Dravida Munnetra Kazhagam
1996	K. Parasuraman	Dravida Munnetra Kazhagam
1998	Kanchi Panneerselvam	All India Anna Dravida Munnetra Kazhagam
1999	A. K. Moorthy	Pattali Makkal Katchi
2004	A. K. Moorthy	Pattali Makkal Katchi

Defunct after 2009 changed to Kanchipuram loksabha constituency.

== Election results ==
Vote share of Winning candidates
2004	56.85%
1999	47.2%
1998	47.3%
1996	55.5%
1991	53.5%
1989	48.4%
1984	52.3%
1980	58.5%
1977	51.3%
1971	58.0%
1967	59.3%
1962	51.1%
1957	26.8%
1952	36.5%

=== General Elections 2004 ===
2004 Indian general election : Chengalpattu
Party	Candidate	Votes	%	±%
PMK	A. K. Moorthy	431,643	56.86%	
AIADMK	K. N. Ramachandran	2,82,919	37.27%	−8.90%
JP	A. Kumaresan	10,956	1.44%	
BSP	J. Nahamani	8,659	1.14%	
Independent	S. Shayeen Banu	6,520	0.86%	
Independent	N. Moorthy	5,427	0.71%	
Independent	S. Sowmiya Narayanan	4,800	0.63%	
Independent	R. S. Manivannan	3,578	0.47%	
Margin of victory		1,48,724	19.59%	17.73%
Turnout		7,59,076	65.00%	6.68%
Registered electors		11,67,736		−2.69%
PMK hold		Swing	8.83%	

=== General Elections 1999 ===
1999 Indian general election : Chengalpattu
Party	Candidate	Votes	%	±%
PMK	A. K. Moorthy	330,551	48.03%	
AIADMK	S. S. Thirunavukkarasu	3,17,740	46.17%	
JD(S)	C. Balaraman	18,028	2.62%	
Independent	S. S. Usman	7,007	1.02%	
Independent	Mu. Krishna Parayanar	6,616	0.96%	
RJD	B. Madhavan	3,040	0.44%	
Margin of victory		12,811	1.86%	−1.56%
Turnout		6,88,181	58.32%	−12.47%
Registered electors		12,00,040		4.52%
PMK gain from DMK		Swing	-10.04%	

=== General Elections 1998 ===
1998 Indian general election : Chengalpattu
Party	Candidate	Votes	%	±%
AIADMK	Kanchi Panneerselvam	329,239	49.10%	
DMK	K. Parasuraman	3,06,323	45.68%	
INC	T. N. Muruganandam	24,968	3.72%	
Independent	M. U. Krishnan Parayanar	5,419	0.81%	
Margin of victory		22,916	3.42%	−29.92%
Turnout		6,70,586	60.67%	−10.12%
Registered electors		11,48,117		9.98%
AIADMK gain from DMK		Swing	-8.98%	

=== General Elections 1996 ===
1996 Indian general election : Chengalpattu
Party	Candidate	Votes	%	±%
DMK	K. Parasuraman	410,483	58.07%	26.99%
INC	S. M. Krishnan	1,74,826	24.73%	
MDMK	C. Arumugam	44,384	6.28%	
AIIC(T)	B. Damodaran	43,820	6.20%	
BJP	K. T. Ragavan	11,112	1.57%	
Margin of victory		2,35,657	33.34%	9.34%
Turnout		7,06,830	70.79%	1.75%
Registered electors		10,43,889		9.65%
DMK gain from AIADMK		Swing	2.99%	

=== General Elections 1991 ===
1991 Indian general election : Chengalpattu
Party	Candidate	Votes	%	±%
AIADMK	S. S. R. Rajendra Kumar	351,613	55.08%	5.96%
DMK	C. Arumugam	1,98,407	31.08%	−0.22%
PMK	V. Kamalambal	78,544	12.30%	
Margin of victory		1,53,206	24.00%	6.18%
Turnout		6,38,365	69.04%	−4.09%
Registered electors		9,52,050		−0.56%
AIADMK hold		Swing	5.96%	

=== General Elections 1989 ===
1989 Indian general election : Chengalpattu
Party	Candidate	Votes	%	±%
AIADMK	Kanchi Panneerselvam	338,711	49.12%	−4.97%
DMK	M. V. Ramu	2,15,844	31.30%	−12.20%
Independent	C. G. Muniyandi Alias Maniam	1,23,300	17.88%	
Independent	N. Kuppan	5,216	0.76%	
Margin of victory		1,22,867	17.82%	7.23%
Turnout		6,89,597	73.13%	−3.97%
Registered electors		9,57,415		29.83%
AIADMK hold		Swing	-4.97%	

=== General Elections 1984 ===
1984 Indian general election : Chengalpattu
Party	Candidate	Votes	%	±%
AIADMK	S. Jagathrakshakan	297,415	54.09%	17.48%
DMK	M. V. Ramu	2,39,206	43.50%	
Independent	V. Selvaraj	3,397	0.62%	
Independent	D. V. Radhakrishnasha	2,484	0.45%	
Margin of victory		58,209	10.59%	−12.67%
Turnout		5,49,896	77.11%	5.26%
Registered electors		7,37,434		9.44%
AIADMK gain from INC(I)		Swing	-5.78%	

=== General Elections 1980 ===
1980 Indian general election : Chengalpattu
Party	Candidate	Votes	%	±%
INC(I)	Era. Anbarasu	283,163	59.86%	
AIADMK	R. Mohanarangam	1,73,147	36.61%	−15.99%
RPI(A)	R. P. Marutharajaa	8,150	1.72%	
Independent	C. Dharmalinga Mudaliar	5,097	1.08%	
Independent	V. T. R. Veerappa Gounder	3,457	0.73%	
Margin of victory		1,10,016	23.26%	15.34%
Turnout		4,73,014	71.84%	−1.38%
Registered electors		6,73,832		6.90%
INC(I) gain from AIADMK		Swing	7.27%	

=== General Elections 1977 ===
1977 Indian general election : Chengalpattu
Party	Candidate	Votes	%	±%
AIADMK	R. Mohanarangam	236,818	52.59%	
DMK	Era Sezhiyan	2,01,179	44.68%	−15.34%
Independent	G. K. Moorthy	4,001	0.89%	
RPI(A)	M. Sundarraj	3,809	0.85%	
Margin of victory		35,639	7.92%	−20.40%
Turnout		4,50,270	73.22%	−1.49%
Registered electors		6,30,334		8.53%
AIADMK gain from DMK		Swing	-7.42%	

=== General Elections 1971 ===
1971 Indian general election : Chengalpattu
Party	Candidate	Votes	%	±%
DMK	C. Chittibabu	251,687	60.02%	−1.31%
INC(O)	P. M. Muthukumarappa	1,32,931	31.70%	
Independent	S. Balakrishnan	26,291	6.27%	
Independent	R. Natesa Goundes	8,453	2.02%	
Margin of victory		1,18,756	28.32%	2.98%
Turnout		4,19,362	74.71%	−5.35%
Registered electors		5,80,796		7.86%
DMK hold		Swing	-1.31%	

=== General Elections 1967 ===
1967 Indian general election : Chengalpattu
Party	Candidate	Votes	%	±%
DMK	C. Chittibabu	255,845	61.32%	
INC	O. V. Alagesan	1,50,114	35.98%	−17.13%
Independent	S. T. Neelakantan	11,258	2.70%	
Margin of victory		1,05,731	25.34%	19.13%
Turnout		4,17,217	80.06%	2.66%
Registered electors		5,38,456		25.35%
DMK gain from INC		Swing	8.22%	

=== General Elections 1962 ===
1962 Indian general election : Chengalpattu
Party	Candidate	Votes	%	±%
INC	O. V. Alagesan	169,988	53.10%	26.54%
Independent	S. Krishnaswamy	1,50,110	46.90%	
Margin of victory		19,878	6.21%	5.96%
Turnout		3,20,098	77.40%	−10.18%
Registered electors		4,29,553		−46.49%
INC gain from Independent		Swing	26.29%	

=== General Elections 1957 ===
1957 Indian general election : Chengalpattu
Party	Candidate	Votes	%	±%
Independent	Dr. A. Krishnaswamy	188,481	26.81%	
INC	O. V. Alagesan	1,86,753	26.57%	−9.97%
Independent	N. Sivaraj	1,53,741	21.87%	
INC	R. Maragatham Chandrasekar	1,48,675	21.15%	−15.38%
Independent	R. Rajaram	25,347	3.61%	
Margin of victory		1,728	0.25%	−9.86%
Turnout		7,02,997	87.58%	42.46%
Registered electors		8,02,716		140.08%
Independent gain from INC		Swing	-9.72%	

=== General Elections 1951 ===
1951–52 Indian general election : Chengalpattu
Party	Candidate	Votes	%	±%
INC	O. V. Alagesan	55,102	36.53%	36.53%
KMPP	A. R. L. Pathy	39,857	26.42%	
All India Republican Party	Srinivasan	34,751	23.04%	
TTP	Umapathi	21,125	14.01%	
Margin of victory		15,245	10.11%	
Turnout		1,50,835	45.11%	
Registered electors		3,34,352		0.00%
INC win (new seat)				

== See also ==
- Chingleput, also known as Chengalpattu
- List of constituencies of the Lok Sabha
