= K. Sundar =

Indian politician (born 1954)

Kannan Sundar
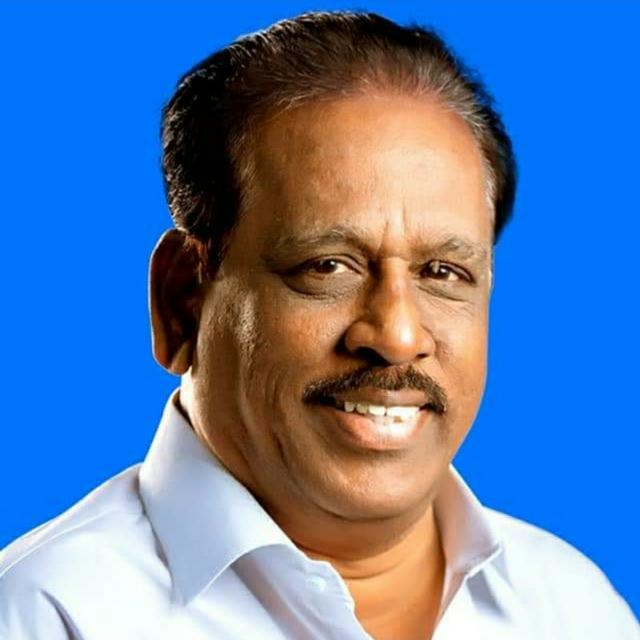
- Sundar in 2019

District Secretary of Dravida Munnetra Kazhagam Kanchipuram (South)
- Incumbent
- Assumed office 26 December 2014

Member of the Tamil Nadu Legislative Assembly
- In office 20 May 2016 – 5 May 2026
- Preceded by: P. Ganesan
- Constituency: Uthiramerur
- In office 11 May 2006 – 13 May 2011
- Preceded by: V. Somasundaram
- Succeeded by: P. Ganesan
- Constituency: Uthiramerur
- In office 10 May 1996 – 14 May 2001
- Preceded by: Kanchi Panneerselvam
- Succeeded by: V. Somasundaram
- Constituency: Uthiramerur
- In office 6 February 1989 – 30 January 1991
- Preceded by: K. Narasimma Pallavan
- Succeeded by: Kanchi Panneerselvam
- Constituency: Uthiramerur

Personal details
- Born: Kannan Sundar; 5 June 1954 (age 71) Salavakkam, India; Tamil Nadu
- Party: Dravida Munnetra Kazhagam
- Parent(s): Father: S.C. Kannan; Mother: Thiripurasundari
- Education: Bachelor of Science
- Alma mater: Pachaiyappa's College, Chennai
- Occupation: Farmer
- Website: ksundar.com

Kannan Sundar (born 5 June 1954) is an Indian politician from Tamil Nadu and a Member of the Legislative Assembly of Tamil Nadu for the Uthiramerur Constituency. He's also the District Secretary of the Dravida Munnetra Kazhagam (DMK) political party, for the Kanchipuram South region. He was elected to the Tamil Nadu legislative assembly from Uthiramerur constituency as a Dravida Munnetra Kazhagam candidate in 1989, 1996, 2006, 2016 and for the fifth time in the 2021 election.

== Early life and family ==
Sundar is the first son of S.C. Kannan and Thiripura Sundari Ammal. He was born in Salavakkam on 5 June 1954. Sundar studied at the Salavakkam High School. He completed his undergraduate course and holds a Maths degree from Pachaiyappa's College, Chennai of the University of Madras. Sundar married K.S. Vasantharani on March 4, 1983 and has two children. His son is S. Vetriselvan, his daughter is Porchelvi.

== Politics ==
His political career began when, as an 11-year-old, he started with Hindi agitation. He continued his support to Dravida Munnetra Kazhagam during his college days at Pachaiyappa's College, Chennai 1972. After his graduation he kept working for Dravida Munnetra Kazhagam. Meanwhile, he also served as the Panchayat president of Salavakkam in the year 1986 and he became the Secretary for Dravida Munnetra Kazhagam, Uthiramerur Union in 1988.

== Electoral performance ==
| Election | Party | Constituency Name | Result | Votes gained | Vote share% |
|---|---|---|---|---|---|
| 2021 | Dravida Munnetra Kazhagam | Uthiramerur | Won | 93,427 | 44.38% |
| 2016 | Dravida Munnetra Kazhagam | Uthiramerur | Won | 85,513 | 43.02% |
| 2006 | Dravida Munnetra Kazhagam | Uthiramerur | Won | 70,488 | 48.75% |
| 2001 | Dravida Munnetra Kazhagam | Uthiramerur | Lost | 46,202 | 35.35% |
| 1996 | Dravida Munnetra Kazhagam | Uthiramerur | Won | 66,086 | 52.84% |
| 1991 | Dravida Munnetra Kazhagam | Uthiramerur | Lost | 29,273 | 25.62% |
| 1989 | Dravida Munnetra Kazhagam | Uthiramerur | Won | 31,304 | 34.71% |
