= Jayalakshmi =

Jayalakshmi is a surname and a given name. Notable people with the name include:

- Fatafat Jayalakshmi (1958–1980), Indian actress mainly in Tamil and Telugu films
- K. S. Jayalakshmi, Indian actress who works in the Tamil film and television industries
- P. K. Jayalakshmi, Indian politician, former Minister for Welfare of Backward Communities in the state Government of Kerala
- Radha Jayalakshmi, Radha (1932–2025) and Jayalakshmi (1932–2014), Indian Carnatic music vocalist duo
- S. Jayalakshmi (1920–2007), Indian Tamil-language film actress and singer
- Soolamangalam Jayalakshmi, one of the Soolamangalam Sisters, Carnatic music sister-pair vocalists and musicians
- V. Jayalakshmi, Indian politician and former Member of Parliament
- Valdivel Jayalakshmi (born 1971), Indian sprinter
- Jayalakshmi Sarikonda (born 1994), Indian archer
- Jayalakshmi Seethapura, folklorist of modern India who writes in Kannada language

== See also ==
- Jayalakshmi Vilas Mansion is a heritage building in Mysore
