= V. K. Ramaswamy =

V. K. Ramaswamy (alternatively Ramasamy or Ramaswami) may refer to:

- V. K. Ramaswamy (umpire) (born 1945), former Indian Test cricket umpire
- V. K. Ramasamy (actor) (1926–2002), Indian actor, comedian and film producer
- V. K. Ramaswami Mudaliar, Indian politician
- V. K. Ramaswamy, Chief Economic Advisor, Government of India
