= Jeevarathinam Rangaswamy =

Indian politician (born 1921)

Jeevarathinam Rangaswamy (born 6 November 1921) is an Indian politician who was leader of Indian National Congress from Tamil Nadu. He served as member of the Lok Sabha representing Arakkonam (Lok Sabha constituency). Rangaswamy was elected to 8th, 9th and 10th Lok Sabha.
