= Arakkonam Lok Sabha constituency =

Parliamentary constituency in Tamil Nadu, India

Coordinates: 13.1°N 79.7°E

Arakkonam
- Lok Sabha constituency
- Interactive map of Arakkonam Loksabha constituency, post-2008 delimitation

Constituency details
- Country: India
- Region: South India
- State: Tamil Nadu
- Assembly constituencies: Ranipet; Arakkonam; Sholinghur; Katpadi; Arcot; Tiruttani
- Established: 1977
- Total electors: 14,94,929

Member of Parliament
- 18th Lok Sabha
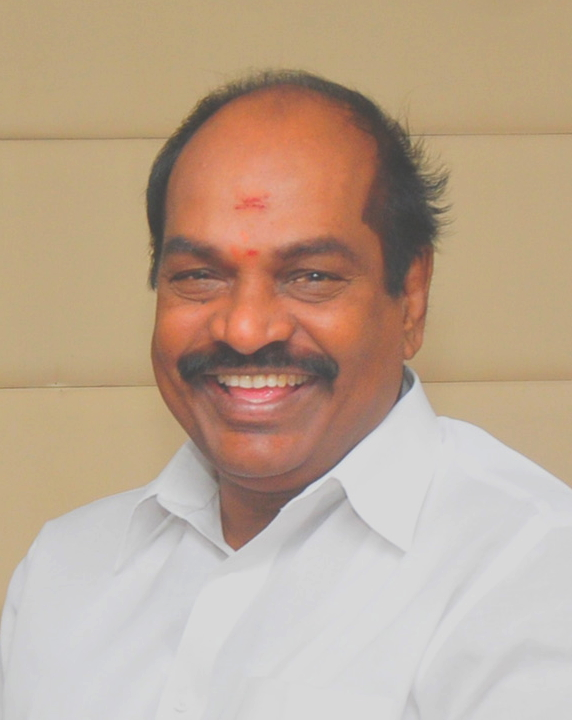
- Incumbent S. Jagathrakshakan
- Party: DMK
- Alliance: None
- Elected year: 2024

Arakkonam is a Lok Sabha (Parliament of India) constituency in Tamil Nadu. Its Tamil Nadu Parliamentary Constituency number is 7 of 39.

== Assembly segments ==
=== After 2009 ===
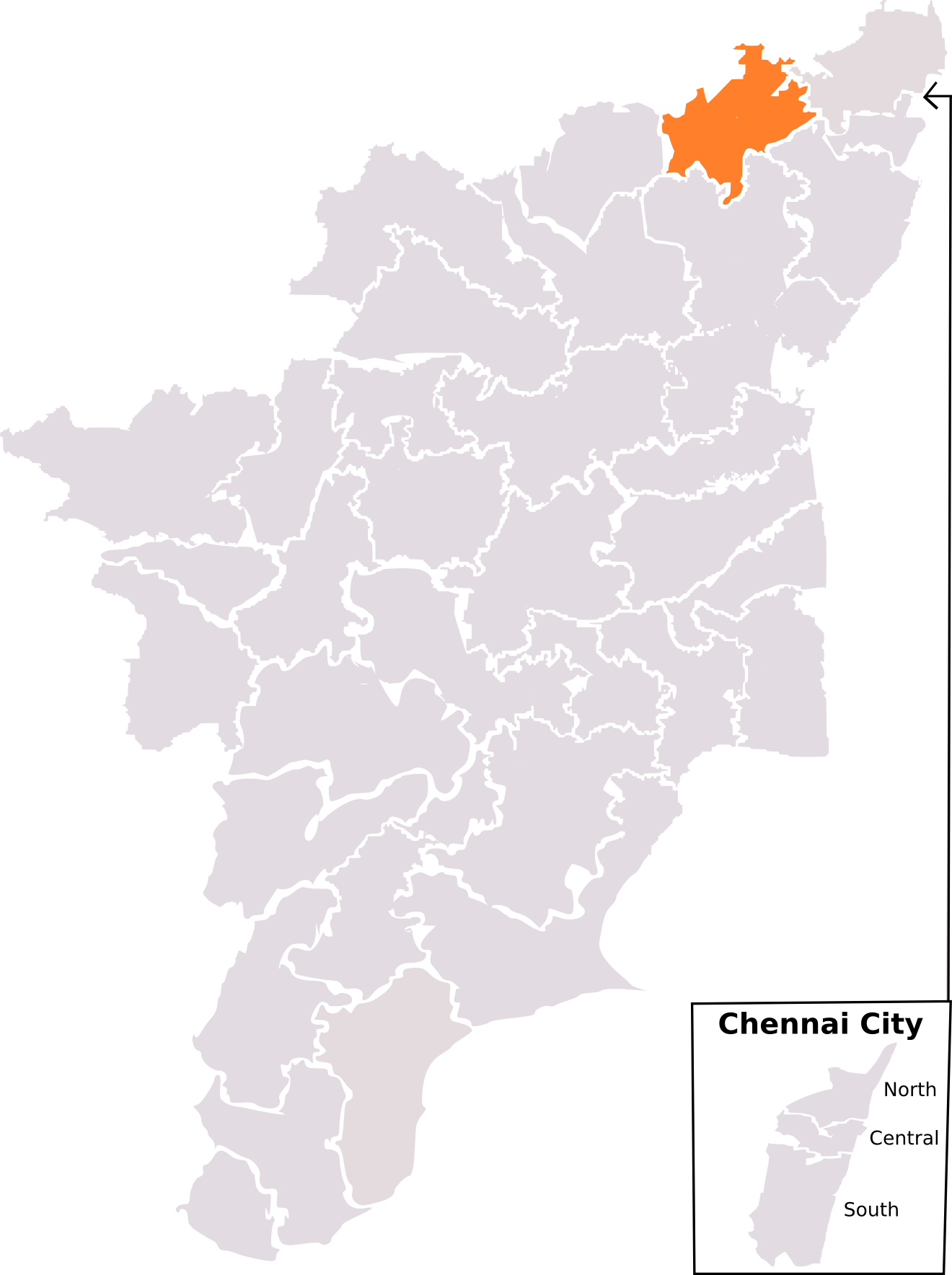
Arakkonam constituency as laid out by 2008 Delimitation

| Constituency number | Name | Reserved for (SC/ST/None) | District | Party | 2024 Lead |
|---|---|---|---|---|---|
| 3. | Tiruttani | None | Thiruvallur | AIADMK | DMK |
| 38. | Arakkonnam | SC | Ranipet | TVK | DMK |
| 39. | Sholinghur | None | Ranipet | TVK | DMK |
| 40. | Katpadi | None | Vellore | TVK | DMK |
| 41. | Ranipet | None | Ranipet | TVK | DMK |
| 42. | Arcot | None | Ranipet | AIADMK | DMK |

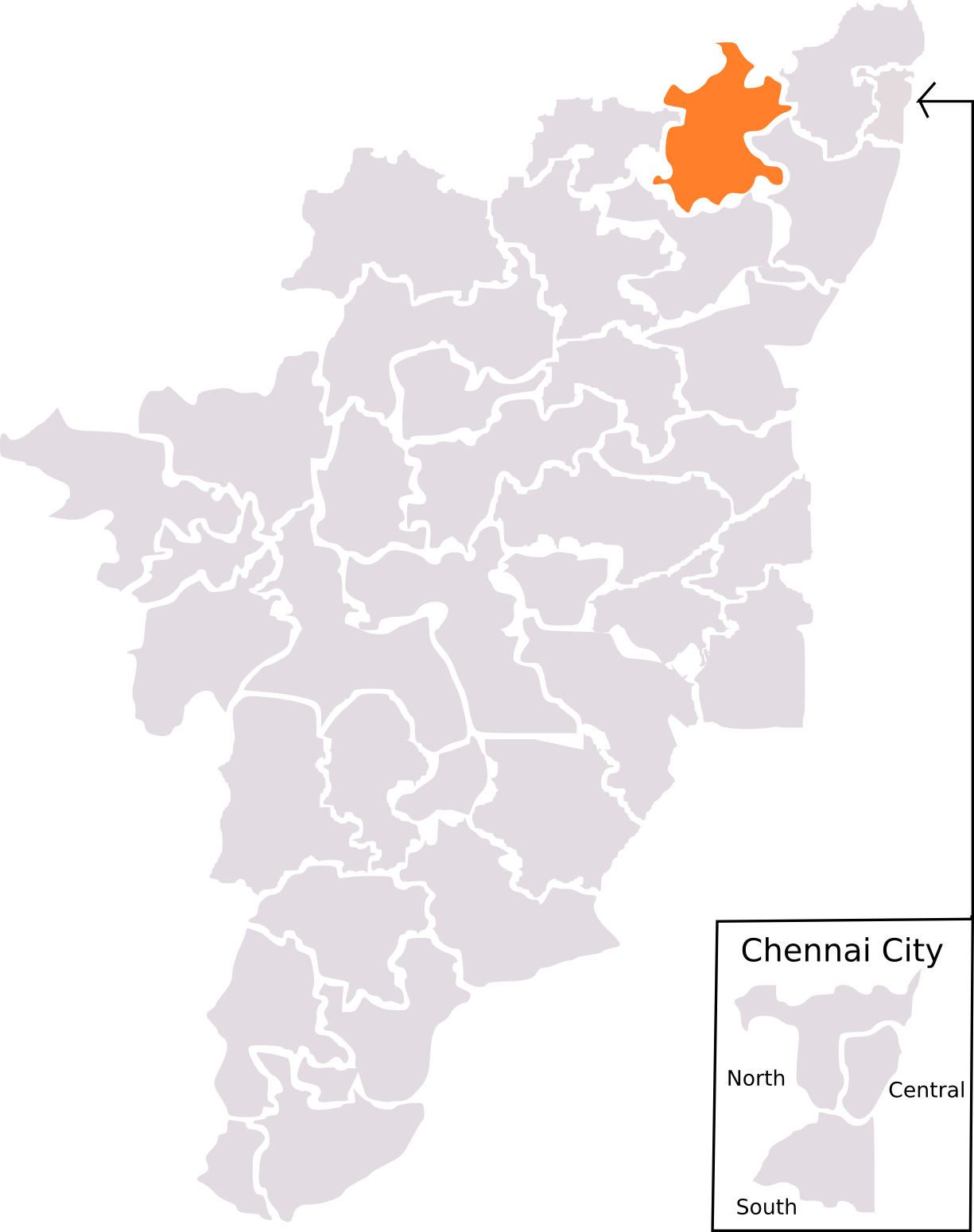
Arakkonam constituency as laid out by 1971 Delimitation. The boundaries for this constituency lasted until 2004 election, which was then replaced by 2008 Delimitation.

=== Before 2009 ===
Arakkonam Lok Sabha constituency was composed of the following assembly segments:

1. Pallipattu (defunct)
2. Arakkonam (SC)
3. Solingar
4. Ranipettai
5. Arcaud
6. Seyyaru (moved to Aarani)

== Members of the Parliament ==
| Year | Winning candidate | Party |
|---|---|---|
| 1967 | S. K. Sambandhan Mudaliar | Dravida Munnetra Kazhagam |
| 1971 | O. V. Alagesa Mudaliar* | Indian National Congress |
| 1977 | O. V. Alagesa Mudaliar* | Indian National Congress |
| 1980 | A. M. Velu Mudaliyar | Indian National Congress |
| 1984 | Jeevarathinam Rangaswamy | Indian National Congress |
| 1989 | Jeevarathinam Rangaswamy | Indian National Congress |
| 1991 | Jeevarathinam Rangaswamy | Indian National Congress |
| 1996 | A. M. Velu Mudaliyar | Tamil Maanila Congress |
| 1998 | C. Gopal Mudaliyar | All India Anna Dravida Munnetra Kazhagam |
| 1999 | S. Jagathrakshakan | Dravida Munnetra Kazhagam |
| 2004 | R. Velu | Pattali Makkal Katchi |
| 2009 | S. Jagathrakshakan | Dravida Munnetra Kazhagam |
| 2014 | G. Hari | All India Anna Dravida Munnetra Kazhagam |
| 2019 | S. Jagathrakshakan | Dravida Munnetra Kazhagam |
| 2024 | S. Jagathrakshakan | Dravida Munnetra Kazhagam |

- *as Tiruthani seat

== Election results ==
Vote share of Winning candidates
| 2024 | 48.39% |
| 2019 | 57.47% |
| 2014 | 45.75% |
| 2009 | 48.75% |
| 2004 | 49.90% |
| 1999 | 47.72% |
| 1998 | 51.56% |
| 1996 | 59.05% |
| 1991 | 53.90% |
| 1989 | 42.77% |
| 1984 | 52.20% |
| 1980 | 60.83% |
| 1977 | 52.40% |

=== General Elections 2024 ===
2024 Indian general election: Arakkonam
| Party | Candidate | Votes | % | ±% |
|---|---|---|---|---|
| DMK | S. Jagathrakshakan | 563,216 | 48.39 | ▼9.08 |
| AIADMK | A. L. Vijayan | 2,56,656 | 22.05 | New |
| PMK | K. Balu | 2,02,325 | 17.38 | ▼11.96 |
| NOTA | None of the above | 12,613 | 1.08 | ▲0.04 |
| Margin of victory | | 3,06,560 | 26.34 | ▼1.79 |
| Turnout | | 11,63,822 | 78.65 | ▲0.67 |
| Registered electors | | 14,79,748 | | |
| DMK hold | | Swing | ▼9.08 | |

=== General Elections 2019 ===
2019 Indian general election: Arakkonam
| Party | Candidate | Votes | % | ±% |
|---|---|---|---|---|
| DMK | S. Jagathrakshakan | 672,190 | 57.47 | 34.03 |
| PMK | A. K. Moorthy | 3,43,234 | 29.34 | |
| AMMK | N. G. Parthiban | 66,826 | 5.71 | |
| MNM | N. Rajendran | 23,771 | 2.03 | |
| NOTA | None Of The Above | 12,179 | 1.04 | 0.08 |
| BSP | D. Doss | 8,307 | 0.71 | 0.03 |
| Margin of victory | | 3,28,956 | 28.12 | 5.80 |
| Turnout | | 11,69,677 | 77.98 | 1.03 |
| Registered electors | | 15,00,016 | | |
| DMK gain from AIADMK | | Swing | 11.71 | |

=== General Elections 2014 ===
2014 Indian general election: Arakkonam
| Party | Candidate | Votes | % | ±% |
|---|---|---|---|---|
| AIADMK | G. Hari | 493,534 | 45.75 | |
| DMK | N. R. Elango | 2,52,768 | 23.43 | −25.31 |
| PMK | R. Velu | 2,33,762 | 21.67 | |
| INC | R. Rajesh | 56,337 | 5.22 | |
| NOTA | None Of The Above | 10,370 | 0.96 | |
| BSP | D. Doss | 7,354 | 0.68 | −0.10 |
| Independent | S. Gajendran | 6,570 | 0.61 | |
| Independent | Panchu Udayakumar | 6,025 | 0.56 | |
| Margin of victory | | 2,40,766 | 22.32 | 9.42 |
| Turnout | | 10,78,682 | 76.95 | −0.55 |
| Registered electors | | 14,01,813 | | 27.60 |
| AIADMK gain from DMK | | Swing | -2.99 | |

=== General Elections 2009 ===
2009 Indian general election: Arakkonam
| Party | Candidate | Votes | % | ±% |
|---|---|---|---|---|
| DMK | S. Jagathrakshakan | 415,041 | 48.75 | |
| PMK | R. Velu | 3,05,245 | 35.85 | |
| DMDK | S. Sankar | 82,038 | 9.64 | |
| Independent | D. Panjatsaram | 7,078 | 0.83 | |
| BSP | Mary John | 6,641 | 0.78 | |
| PNK | W. B. Palan | 6,026 | 0.71 | |
| Margin of victory | | 1,09,796 | 12.90 | −0.28 |
| Turnout | | 10,98,607 | 77.50 | 10.67 |
| Rejected ballots | | 147 | 0.02 | |
| Registered electors | | 8,51,402 | | −5.31 |
| DMK gain from PMK | | Swing | -1.15 | |

=== General Elections 2004 ===
2004 Indian general election: Arakkonam
| Party | Candidate | Votes | % | ±% |
|---|---|---|---|---|
| PMK | R. Velu | 586,911 | 49.90 | |
| AIADMK | N. Shanmugam | 4,84,715 | 36.72 | |
| JD(U) | S. Sethu Madhavan | 34,876 | 4.50 | |
| JP | M. Kulandaivelu | 22,284 | 2.87 | |
| Independent | V. Venkatesan | 9,646 | 1.24 | |
| RPI(A) | S. Arunkumar | 5,507 | 0.71 | |
| Independent | M. Velu | 5,022 | 0.65 | |
| Independent | N. Ravi | 4,371 | 0.56 | |
| Independent | G. Sampath | 4,333 | 0.56 | |
| Independent | K. Velu | 4,061 | 0.52 | |
| Margin of victory | | 1,02,196 | 13.18 | 0.01 |
| Turnout | | 7,75,439 | 66.83 | 0.51 |
| Registered electors | | 11,60,259 | | 3.59 |
| PMK gain from DMK | | Swing | 2.17 | |

=== General Elections 1999 ===
1999 Indian general election: Arakkonam
| Party | Candidate | Votes | % | ±% |
|---|---|---|---|---|
| DMK | S. Jagathrakshakan | 346,520 | 47.72 | |
| INC | K. V. Thangkabalu | 2,50,876 | 34.55 | 12.22 |
| TMC(M) | A. M. Velu | 1,21,386 | 16.72 | |
| Margin of victory | | 95,644 | 13.17 | 6.07 |
| Turnout | | 7,26,113 | 66.32 | −6.89 |
| Registered electors | | 11,20,043 | | 4.41 |
| DMK gain from TMC(M) | | Swing | -11.32 | |

=== General Elections 1998 ===
1998 Indian general election: Arakkonam
| Party | Candidate | Votes | % | ±% |
|---|---|---|---|---|
| AIADMK | C. Gopal | 359,431 | 51.56 | |
| TMC(M) | A. M. Velu | 3,09,943 | 44.46 | |
| INC | R. Dhamotharan | 24,519 | 3.52 | |
| Margin of victory | | 49,488 | 7.10 | −29.61 |
| Turnout | | 6,97,078 | 67.26 | −5.95 |
| Registered electors | | 10,72,687 | | 3.68 |
| AIADMK gain from TMC(M) | | Swing | -7.48 | |

=== General Elections 1996 ===
1996 Indian general election: Arakkonam
| Party | Candidate | Votes | % | ±% |
|---|---|---|---|---|
| TMC(M) | A. M. Velu | 425,974 | 59.05 | |
| INC | R. Raviram | 1,61,129 | 22.34 | −31.56 |
| AIIC(T) | N. Venugopal | 80,714 | 11.19 | |
| JD | Jayakaran Joseph | 31,703 | 4.39 | |
| BJP | N. Manoharan | 6,596 | 0.91 | −1.09 |
| Independent | K. Manavalan | 3,433 | 0.48 | |
| Margin of victory | | 2,64,845 | 36.71 | 9.38 |
| Turnout | | 7,21,411 | 73.21 | 3.98 |
| Registered electors | | 10,34,646 | | 6.80 |
| TMC(M) gain from INC | | Swing | 5.15 | |

=== General Elections 1991 ===
1991 Indian general election: Arakkonam
| Party | Candidate | Votes | % | ±% |
|---|---|---|---|---|
| INC | Jeevarathinam Rangaswamy | 348,516 | 53.90 | 11.13 |
| DMK | M. Kannaiyan | 1,71,806 | 26.57 | −7.29 |
| PMK | S. Subramaniam | 98,809 | 15.28 | |
| BJP | D. V. R. Eraghavan | 12,954 | 2.00 | |
| Margin of victory | | 1,76,710 | 27.33 | 18.42 |
| Turnout | | 6,46,635 | 69.23 | −3.84 |
| Registered electors | | 9,68,764 | | −0.65 |
| INC hold | | Swing | 11.13 | |

=== General Elections 1989 ===
1989 Indian general election: Arakkonam
| Party | Candidate | Votes | % | ±% |
|---|---|---|---|---|
| INC | Jeevarathinam Rangaswamy | 299,587 | 42.77 | −9.43 |
| DMK | K. Murthy | 2,37,194 | 33.86 | −7.47 |
| PMK | S. Subramaniam | 1,47,902 | 21.11 | |
| Margin of victory | | 62,393 | 8.91 | −1.96 |
| Turnout | | 7,00,515 | 73.07 | −5.18 |
| Registered electors | | 9,75,104 | | 28.70 |
| INC hold | | Swing | -9.43 | |

=== General Elections 1984 ===
1984 Indian general election: Arakkonam
| Party | Candidate | Votes | % | ±% |
|---|---|---|---|---|
| INC | Jeevarathinam Rangaswamy | 292,606 | 52.20 | |
| DMK | Pulavar K Govindan | 2,31,664 | 41.33 | |
| BJP | M. D. Kalyanasundaram | 15,462 | 2.76 | |
| Independent | K. Selvaraju | 10,158 | 1.81 | |
| Independent | A. Kanthappan | 8,967 | 1.60 | |
| Margin of victory | | 60,942 | 10.87 | −14.76 |
| Turnout | | 5,60,559 | 78.26 | 11.52 |
| Registered electors | | 7,57,665 | | 8.02 |
| INC gain from INC(I) | | Swing | -8.63 | |

=== General Elections 1980 ===
1980 Indian general election: Arakkonam
| Party | Candidate | Votes | % | ±% |
|---|---|---|---|---|
| INC(I) | A. M. Velu | 278,516 | 60.83 | |
| AIADMK | A. M. Ragunathan | 1,61,155 | 35.20 | |
| Independent | K. Krishnan | 7,904 | 1.73 | |
| Independent | A. M. Periasamy Reddiar | 4,153 | 0.91 | |
| Independent | C. A. Balakrishnan | 3,255 | 0.71 | |
| JP(S) | A. Janaki Raman | 2,875 | 0.63 | |
| Margin of victory | | 1,17,361 | 25.63 | 13.20 |
| Turnout | | 4,57,858 | 66.74 | −4.88 |
| Registered electors | | 7,01,433 | | 5.11 |
| INC(I) gain from INC | | Swing | 8.43 | |

=== General Elections 1977 ===
1977 Indian general election: Arakkonam
| Party | Candidate | Votes | % | ±% |
|---|---|---|---|---|
| INC | O. V. Alagesan | 243,818 | 52.40 | |
| DMK | N. Veeraswami | 1,85,954 | 39.96 | |
| Independent | R. Margabandu | 11,997 | 2.58 | |
| Independent | Y. Daniel | 9,638 | 2.07 | |
| Independent | K. Selvaraju | 4,471 | 0.96 | |
| Independent | A. Kanthappan | 3,670 | 0.79 | |
| Independent | D. Raghavan | 2,593 | 0.56 | |
| Margin of victory | | 57,864 | 12.44 | |
| Turnout | | 4,65,330 | 71.62 | |
| Registered electors | | 6,67,308 | | |
| INC win (new seat) | | | | |

Note: The incumbent party Dravida Munnetra Kazhagam did not contest this seat in 2004. Instead it was contested by its United Progressive Alliance (UPA) coalition partner Pattali Makkal Katchi (PMK), who won the seat. Thus, the UPA held the seat. PMK had not contested this seat in the previous 1999 elections.

== See also ==
- Arakkonam
- List of constituencies of the Lok Sabha
