= C. Chittibabu =

Indian politician

29th Mayor of Madras
- In office 1965–1966
- Preceded by: S. Krishnamurthy
- Succeeded by: Era Sambandham

Member of Parliament, Lok Sabha
- In office 1967-76
- Preceded by: O. V. Alagesan
- Succeeded by: R. Mohanarangam
- Constituency: Chengalpattu constituency

Personal details
- Born: 19 October 1935 Tindivanam, Madras Presidency, British India
- Died: 5 January 1977 (aged 45) Madras, Tamil Nadu, India (now Chennai)
- Party: DMK
- Spouse(s): Raja Lakshmi, Gangabai
- Children: 2

Chokalinga Chittibabu, commonly known as Mayor Chittibabu, was an Indian politician and former Member of Parliament elected from Tamil Nadu. He was elected to the Lok Sabha from Chengalpattu constituency as a Dravida Munnetra Kazhagam candidate in 1967 and 1971 elections. He was first elected to the Madras Corporation in 1958 and was the Mayor of Madras in 1965. He was arrested under the Maintenance of Internal Security Act after Indira Gandhi declared emergency and the DMK government was dismissed in 1976. He was jailed along with DMK leaders and died of injuries due to police torture suffered while trying to save M.K. Stalin in Madras Central Prison.
