= Mahagathbandhan =

Mahagathbandhan (transl. Grand Alliance) may refer to these political alliances in India:

- Mahagathbandhan (Bihar), alliance in the 2015 Bihar Legislative Assembly election, of the Rashtriya Janata Dal, Janata Dal (United), and Indian National Congress, against the ruling Bharatiya Janata Party
- Mahagathbandhan (Jharkhand), alliance in the 2019 Indian general election in Jharkhand
- Mahagathbandhan (Uttar Pradesh), alliance in the 2019 Indian general election in Uttar Pradesh, of the Samajwadi Party. Bahujan Samaj Party and the Rashtriya Lok Dal, against the Bharatiya Janata Party and the Indian National Congress

== See also ==
- Grand Alliance (disambiguation)
- Gathbandhan, an Indian TV series
- Gathbandhan (Uttar Pradesh) or Samajwadi Alliance, led by the Samajwadi Party in Uttar Pradesh, India
