= R. Velu =

Indian politician

Rangasamy Velu
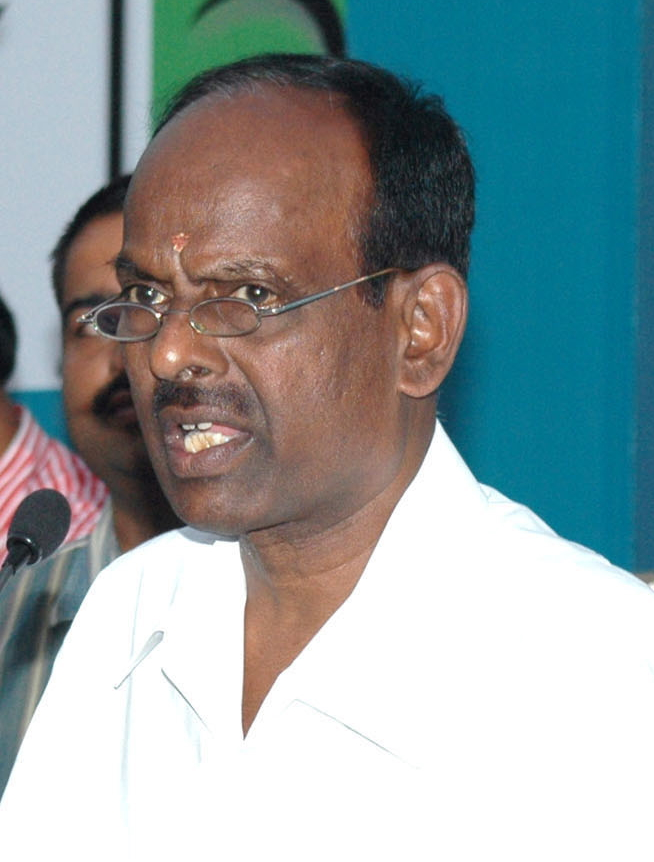
- R. Velu addressing addressing at the Closing Ceremony of the 56th Senior National Kabaddi Championship on 14 October 2008

Former Union Minister of State for Railways
- In office 22 May 2004 — 29 March 2009
- Prime Minister: Manmohan Singh
- Preceded by: Basangouda Patil Yatnal
- Succeeded by: K. H. Muniyappa

Member of Parliament, Lok Sabha
- In office 16 May 2004 — 16 May 2009
- Preceded by: S. Jagathrakshakan
- Succeeded by: S. Jagathrakshakan
- Constituency: Arakkonam

Personal details
- Born: 26 July 1940 (age 86) Pudhupalayam village Arni taluk, Thiruvannamalai district, Tamil Nadu
- Party: PMK
- Spouse: V.Malliga (79)
- Children: 1 son, Dr. Thanigainath and 1 daughter, Dr. Priya.
- As of 22 September, 2006

Rangasamy Velu (born 26 July 1940), is an former IAS officer and Indian politician of the Pattali Makkal Katchi (PMK) party. He joined Indian Administrative Officer from the 1981 batch in Tamil Nadu Cadre, he was elected to the 14th Lok Sabha as Union Minister of State, Railways from Arakkonam Lok Sabha constituency of Tamil Nadu from 2004 to 2009.

== Early life and education ==
Born into a family of traditional farmers, Dr. Velu was educated at the local government-run High School in the Pudupalayam Village. A keen young learner, he excelled in academics and went to the Voorhees College, Vellore to pursue a Bachelors' course in Economics to obtain his first degree. After it, he never stopped learning; he went on to pursue many more courses and added a long line of degrees to his name. He is a Bachelor of Law from the Madras Law College, Master of Business Administration, and was a resident of the Bishop Heber Hall. He completed a PhD in Disaster Management while being well into his sixties. He is an avid reader, a connoisseur of books and is an indiscriminating seeker and acceptor of knowledge unknown to him.

== Career ==
Velu has been a bureaucrat almost throughout his entire career timeline. He served as Additional Registrar, Co-operative Societies of Tamil Nadu; director, Municipal Administration; and Joint Commissioner, Revenue Administration. He also was conferred to be an officer of the Indian Administrative Service, in recognition of his potential. He became the District Collector of Tirunelveli twice, serving during and helping curb immense caste violence. He later served as a member of the Tamil Nadu Service Commission.

He joined politics to be elected to the 14th Lok Sabha from the Arakkonam Constituency of Tamil Nadu with a margin of 1,02,196 votes. He took office as Union Minister of State for Railways in 2004 as a part of the first Manmohan Singh government.

== Current life ==
Velu has authored and published his autobiography titled "En Vāzhkai Payanam" in Tamil on the request of late former Indian president Dr. APJ Abdul Kalam. He now lives in Chennai as a retired politician and bureaucrat, pursuing charity and helping build a temple in his village, along with his family.
