= A. M. Velu =

Indian politician

A. M. Velu Mudaliyar was an Indian politician and former Member of Parliament elected from Tamil Nadu. He was elected to the Lok Sabha from Arakkonam constituency as an Indian National Congress (Indira) candidate in 1980 election, and as a Tamil Maanila Congress (Moopanar) candidate in 1996 election.
