= 1971 Indian general election in Orissa =

- 1–10 March 1971

20 seats
	First party	Second party	Third party
Party	INC	SWA	Utkal Congress
Last election	6	8	New
Seats won	15	3	1
Seat change	▲9	▼5	▲1
	Fourth party
Party	CPI
Last election	0
Seats won	1
Seat change	▲1

The 1971 Indian general election in Orissa were held for 20 seats with the state going to the polls in the first two phases of the general elections.

The major contenders in the state were the Indian National Congress and the Swatantra Party. The third front parties contesting in the state were the Utkal Congress, the Left parties. The assembly elections were held simultaneously with the general elections in the state.

Biju Patnaik was close to Indira Gandhi. However, they clashed in 1969 over the presidential election. He left the Congress and formed a regional party called Utkal Congress.

== Voting and results ==
Source: Election Commission of India

=== List of elected MPs ===
Keys: INC Swatantra Party Communist Party of India Utkal Congress

S No.	Constituency	Winning candidate	Winning party
1	Mayurbhanj	Manmohan Tudu	Indian National Congress
2	Balasore	Shyamsundar Mohapatra	Indian National Congress
3	Bhadrak	Arjun Charan Sethi	Indian National Congress
4	Jajpur	Anandi Charan Das	Indian National Congress
5	Kendrapara	Surendra Mohanty	Utkal Congress
6	Cuttack	Janki Ballav Patnaik	Indian National Congress
7	Puri	Banamali Patanaik	Indian National Congress
8	Bhubaneswar	Chintamani Panigrahi	Indian National Congress
9	Bhanjanagar	Dutikrishna Panda	Communist Party of India
10	Chatrapur	Jagannath Rao	Indian National Congress
11	Koraput	Bhagirathi Gomango	Indian National Congress
12	Nowrangpur	Khagipathi Pradhani	Indian National Congress
13	Kalahandi	Pratap Keshari Deo	Swatantra Party
14	Phulbani	Boksi Nayak	Swatantra Party
15	Bolangir	Raj Raj Singh Deo	Swatantra Party
16	Sambalpur	Banamali Babu	Indian National Congress
17	Sundargarh	Gajadhar Majhi	Indian National Congress
18	Keonjhar	Kumar Majhi	Indian National Congress
19	Dhenkanal	Devendra Satpathy	Indian National Congress
20	Angul	Pratap Gangadebbad Kumar	Indian National Congress

=== Bye Elections ===
S No.	Constituency	Winning candidate	Winning party	Reason
1.	Koraput	Giridhar Gamang	Indian National Congress	Resignation of Bhagirathi Gamang
2.	Mayurbhanj	Chandra Mohan Sinha	Utkal Congress	Resignation of Manmohan Tudu
