= S. Pakkur Subramanyan =

Indian politician

S. Pakkur Subramanyam was a Politician and former Member of the Legislative Assembly of Tamil Nadu. He was elected to the Tamil Nadu legislative assembly as an Anna Dravida Munnetra Kazhagam candidate from Uthiramerur constituency in 1977 election.
