= V. K. Ramaswami Mudaliar =

Indian politician

V. K. Ramaswami Mudaliar was an Indian politician and former Opposition Leader of the Member of the Legislative Assembly of Tamil Nadu. He was elected to the Tamil Nadu legislative assembly from Uthiramerur constituency as an Indian National Congress candidate in 1952 election, and as an Independent candidate in 1957 election. He set up Madras labour union along with B.P.Wadia.
