= Sri Venkateswara College of Law =

Law college in Andhra Pradesh

Sri Venkateswara College of Law is a private law school situated at Tirupati in the Indian state of Andhra Pradesh. The college offers 3 years LL.B. and five-years integrated LL.B. courses approved by the Bar Council of India (BCI), New Delhi and affiliated to Sri Venkateswara University.

== History ==
This college got permission from the Government of Andhra Pradesh and was established in 1991. It was affiliated to Sri Venkateswara University on 1 June 1992.
