= V. Somasundaram =

Indian politician

V. Somasundaram is an Indian politician and was a member of the 14th Tamil Nadu Legislative Assembly from 2011 to 2016 Kancheepuram constituency. He represented the All India Anna Dravida Munnetra Kazhagam party. He was the Handlooms and Textiles minister during AIADMK's previous governing period during 2001 to 2006 from the Uthiramerur constituency.

The elections of 2016 resulted in his constituency being won by C. V. M. P. Ezhilarasan.
