= A. K. Moorthy =

Indian politician

A.K. Moorthy
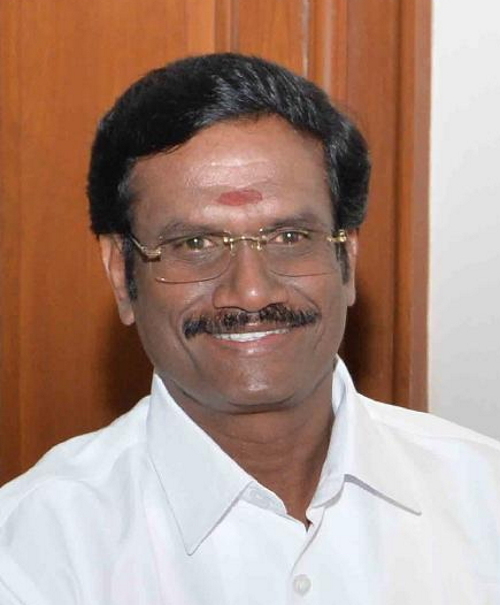

Union Minister of State, Ministry of Railways
- In office 11 July 2002 – 15 January 2004
- Prime Minister: Atal Bihari Vajpayee

Deputy General Secretary of PMK
- In office 1999

Member of Parliament, Lok Sabha
- In office 6 October 1999 – 16 May 2009
- Preceded by: Kanchi Panneerselvam
- Succeeded by: P. Vishwanathan
- Constituency: Chengalpattu, Tamil Nadu

Personal details
- Born: 12 July 1964 (age 62) Viluppuram, Tamil Nadu
- Party: PMK
- Spouse: A.M. Pathmini Devi
- Children: A.K. Vijay Maghesh (Advocate), A.K. Samithra
- Website: http://facebook.com/akmoorthy

A.K. Moorthy is Indian politician who was a Deputy General Secretary of PMK, Former Member of parliament, Lok Sabha, Former Union Minister of State for Railways in Atal Bihari led NDA government.

He was born 12 July 1964 at Kilmambattu a remote village in Gingee Taluk, in Tamil Nadu in an agriculturalist family. He did his schooling in the said village and later acquired MA. in Sociology from Annamalai University. He moved on to Chennai and started his own business.

At this stage, he came in contact with PMK Founder S. Ramadoss, attracted by the policies and activities of the Party. He started his political career as an ordinary party member and rose in the party hierarchy to the level of Deputy General Secretary of the PMK Party. He contested the Chengalpattu Lok Sabha Constituency for the first time in 1999, won with a handsome margin and got elected to the 13th Lok Sabha.

Shri A.K.Moorthy was inducted to the Union Council of Ministers as a Minister of State for Railways on 1 July 2002. He assumed charge as Minister of State for Railways on 2 July 2002. Shri Moorthy, Minister of state for Railways has visited 152 Railway Stations spread around the Northern Railway, Central Railway, Western Railway, Eastern railway, South Central Railway, and Southern Railway during his tenure as a Union Minister.

A.K. Moorthy during his tenure introduced many trains for people which benefited the country. Special appreciation was also given by former Prime Minister of India Shri Atal Bihari Vajpayee and former President of India Shri A. P. J. Abdul Kalam.

A.K. Moorthy for the second time contested the Chengalpattu Lok Sabha Constituency in 2004, and got elected to the 14th Lok Sabha. He served the people of Chengalpattu Lok Sabha Constituency as a representative for 10 years in the Parliament of India. Mr. Moorthy was also a Member of Parliamentary Standing Committee.

== Positions held ==
Tenure	Position
Prior to 1999	Deputy General Secretary, P.M.K.
1999	Elected to 13th Lok Sabha
1999–2000	Member, Committee on Communications Member, Rules Committee
1999–2000 and 2000–2001	Member, Committee on the Welfare of Scheduled Castes and Scheduled Tribes
2000–2002	Member, Consultative Committee, Ministry of Surface Transport
1 July 2002 – 15 Jan.2004	Union Minister of State, Ministry of Railways Member, Consultative Committee, Ministry of Rural Development
2004	Re-elected to 14th Lok Sabha( 2nd term) Member, Committee on Chemicals and Fertilizers Member, Committee on Personnel, Public Grievances, Law & Justice
5 Aug. 2007 onwards	Member, Committee on Urban Development
