= Uthiramerur Assembly constituency =

State Legislative Assembly Constituency in Tamil Nadu

Coordinates: 12.6146°N 79.7584°E

Uthiramerur
- Constituency No. 36 for the Tamil Nadu Legislative Assembly

Constituency details
- Country: India
- Region: South India
- State: Tamil Nadu
- District: Kanchipuram
- Lok Sabha constituency: Kancheepuram
- Established: 1951
- Total electors: 2,46,248

Member of Legislative Assembly
- 17th Tamil Nadu Legislative Assembly
- Incumbent J. Munirathinam
- Party: TVK
- Elected year: 2026

Uthiramerur is a state assembly constituency in Kancheepuram district of Tamil Nadu, India. Its State Assembly Constituency number is 36. It comprises Uthiramerur taluk and a portion of Kanchipuram taluk and forms a part of Kancheepuram Lok Sabha constituency for national elections to the Parliament of India. It is one of the 234 State Legislative Assembly Constituencies in Tamil Nadu, in India.

== Members of Legislative Assembly ==
Year	Member	Political party
Madras State
1952	V. K. Ramaswami Mudaliar	Indian National Congress
1957	V. K. Ramaswami Mudaliar	Independent
1962	O. Srinivasa Reddiar	Indian National Congress
1967	K. M. Rajagopal	Dravida Munnetra Kazhagam
Tamil Nadu
1977	S. Pakkur Subramanyan	All India Anna Dravida Munnetra Kazhagam
1980	S. Jagathrakshakan	All India Anna Dravida Munnetra Kazhagam
1984	K. Narasimma Pallavan	All India Anna Dravida Munnetra Kazhagam
1989	K. Sundar	Dravida Munnetra Kazhagam
1991	Kanchi Panneerselvam	All India Anna Dravida Munnetra Kazhagam
1996	K. Sundar	Dravida Munnetra Kazhagam
2001	V. Somasundaram	All India Anna Dravida Munnetra Kazhagam
2006	K. Sundar	Dravida Munnetra Kazhagam
2011	P. Ganesan	All India Anna Dravida Munnetra Kazhagam
2016	K. Sundar	Dravida Munnetra Kazhagam
2021	K. Sundar	Dravida Munnetra Kazhagam
2026	J. Munirathinam	Tamilaga Vettri Kazhagam

== Election results ==
Vote share of winning candidates
2026	37.28%
2021	44.38%
2016	43.02%
2011	51.75%
2006	48.75%
2001	56.48%
1996	52.84%
1991	55.46%
1989	34.71%
1984	57.21%
1980	49.11%
1977	45.03%
1971	68.85%
1967	64.01%
1962	53.71%
1957	41.25%
1952	36.39%

=== 2026 ===
2026 Tamil Nadu Legislative Assembly election: Uthiramerur
Party	Candidate	Votes	%	±%
TVK	Munirathinam. J	84,917	37.28	New
DMK	Sundar. K	70,694	31.04	▼13.34
PMK	Mageshkumar. P	62,809	27.58	New
NTK	Maram Masilamani. B.S	5,783	2.54	▼2.88
NOTA	NOTA	1,114	0.49	
Independent	Devarajan. C	551	0.24	New
Independent	Deventhiramoorthy. S	390	0.17	New
Desiya Makkal Sakthi Katchi	Sivakumar. A	342	0.15	New
TVK	Jakirusan. D	235	0.10	New
Independent	Anbu. V	221	0.10	New
Independent	Maheswari. J	212	0.09	New
Independent	Magesh Kumar. T	207	0.09	New
Independent	Gunasekar. V	125	0.05	New
Independent	Cittibabu. R	95	0.04	New
Independent	Kamalakannan. K	70	0.03	New
Margin of victory		14,223	6.24	▲5.47
Turnout		2,27,765	92.49	▲11.63
Registered electors		2,46,248		▼14,119
TVK gain from DMK		Swing	▲37.28	

=== 2021 ===
2021 Tamil Nadu Legislative Assembly election: Uthiramerur
Party	Candidate	Votes	%	±%
DMK	K. Sundar	93,427	44.38%	+1.36
AIADMK	V. Somasundaram	91,805	43.61%	+6.7
NTK	S. Kamacthi	11,405	5.42%	New
AMMK	R. V. Ranjithkumar	7,211	3.43%	New
MNM	A. Susaiappar	2,100	1.00%	New
Margin of victory		1,622	0.77%	−5.35%
Turnout		210,529	80.86%	−2.15%
Rejected ballots		442	0.21%	
Registered electors		260,367		
DMK hold		Swing	1.36%	

=== 2016 ===
2016 Tamil Nadu Legislative Assembly election: Uthiramerur
Party	Candidate	Votes	%	±%
DMK	K. Sundar	85,513	43.02%	−0.53
AIADMK	P. Ganesan	73,357	36.90%	−14.85
PMK	N. Gangadharan	24,221	12.19%	New
DMDK	M. Rajendran	9,184	4.62%	New
NOTA	NOTA	1,647	0.83%	New
Margin of victory		12,156	6.12%	−2.08%
Turnout		198,773	83.00%	−3.45%
Registered electors		239,472		
DMK gain from AIADMK		Swing	-8.73%	

=== 2011 ===
2011 Tamil Nadu Legislative Assembly election: Uthiramerur
Party	Candidate	Votes	%	±%
AIADMK	P. Ganesan	86,912	51.75%	+11.31
DMK	Ponkumar	73,146	43.55%	−5.19
Independent	M. Mohanavelu	1,917	1.14%	New
BJP	K. Gurumurthy	1,407	0.84%	+0.14
Independent	M. J. Arokiasamy	1,133	0.67%	New
Independent	V. Deivasigamani	1,063	0.63%	New
Margin of victory		13,766	8.20%	−0.11%
Turnout		167,946	86.46%	7.20%
Registered electors		194,258		
AIADMK gain from DMK		Swing	3.00%	

=== 2006 ===
2006 Tamil Nadu Legislative Assembly election: Uthiramerur
Party	Candidate	Votes	%	±%
DMK	K. Sundar	70,488	48.75%	+13.4
AIADMK	V. Somasundaram	58,472	40.44%	−16.04
DMDK	D. Murugesan	10,335	7.15%	New
Independent	K. K. Venkatesan	2,070	1.43%	New
Independent	R. Lakshimi Narasiman	1,043	0.72%	New
BJP	T. Rajavelu	1,010	0.70%	New
Margin of victory		12,016	8.31%	−12.82%
Turnout		144,596	79.25%	12.68%
Registered electors		182,455		
DMK gain from AIADMK		Swing	-7.73%	

=== 2001 ===
2001 Tamil Nadu Legislative Assembly election: Uthiramerur
Party	Candidate	Votes	%	±%
AIADMK	V. Somasundaram	73,824	56.48%	+30.09
DMK	K. Sundar	46,202	35.35%	−17.5
MDMK	G. Radha Krishnan	2,668	2.04%	−0.71
Independent	C. Ravi Chandran	2,499	1.91%	New
Independent	T. Tamil Vendan	2,399	1.84%	New
Puratchi Bharatham	D. Parvendan	1,293	0.99%	New
Independent	V. Managa	834	0.64%	New
Margin of victory		27,622	21.13%	−5.33%
Turnout		130,716	66.57%	−7.38%
Registered electors		196,375		
AIADMK gain from DMK		Swing	3.63%	

=== 1996 ===
1996 Tamil Nadu Legislative Assembly election: Uthiramerur
Party	Candidate	Votes	%	±%
DMK	K. Sundar	66,086	52.84%	+27.23
AIADMK	N. K. Gnanasekaran	32,994	26.38%	−29.07
PMK	V. Kamalambal	19,143	15.31%	New
MDMK	K. P. Janakiraman	3,446	2.76%	New
Independent	Gv. Mathiazhagan	1,401	1.12%	New
Margin of victory		33,092	26.46%	−3.38%
Turnout		125,058	73.95%	3.36%
Registered electors		176,287		
DMK gain from AIADMK		Swing	-2.61%	

=== 1991 ===
1991 Tamil Nadu Legislative Assembly election: Uthiramerur
Party	Candidate	Votes	%	±%
AIADMK	Kanchi Panneerselvam	63,367	55.46%	+33.09
DMK	K. Sundar	29,273	25.62%	−9.09
PMK	R. Viswanathan	20,552	17.99%	New
Margin of victory		34,094	29.84%	17.50%
Turnout		114,265	70.59%	9.30%
Registered electors		166,439		
AIADMK gain from DMK		Swing	20.75%	

=== 1989 ===
1989 Tamil Nadu Legislative Assembly election: Uthiramerur
Party	Candidate	Votes	%	±%
DMK	K. Sundar	31,304	34.71%	−4.89
AIADMK	P. Sundar Raman	20,175	22.37%	−34.84
INC	Era. Anbarasu	12,057	13.37%	New
Independent	R. Selvaraj	12,019	13.33%	New
AIADMK	S. Jagathrakshakan	8,921	9.89%	−47.32
Independent	A. V. Devraj	2,307	2.56%	New
Independent	C. Elumalai	1,784	1.98%	New
Independent	K. M. Elango	473	0.52%	New
Margin of victory		11,129	12.34%	−5.27%
Turnout		90,191	61.29%	−16.52%
Registered electors		150,706		
DMK gain from AIADMK		Swing	-22.50%	

=== 1984 ===
1984 Tamil Nadu Legislative Assembly election: Uthiramerur
Party	Candidate	Votes	%	±%
AIADMK	K. Narasimma Pallavan	57,797	57.21%	+8.1
DMK	C. V. M. A. Ponmozhi	40,007	39.60%	New
Independent	A. V. Devaraj	2,784	2.76%	New
Margin of victory		17,790	17.61%	15.81%
Turnout		101,024	77.81%	8.12%
Registered electors		134,151		
AIADMK hold		Swing	8.10%	

=== 1980 ===
1980 Tamil Nadu Legislative Assembly election: Uthiramerur
Party	Candidate	Votes	%	±%
AIADMK	S. Jagathrakshakan	43,303	49.11%	+4.08
INC	S. Ramadoss	41,717	47.31%	+34.86
JP	P. Seetharama Naicker	1,434	1.63%	New
Independent	M. Murugesan	983	1.11%	New
Independent	P. Mani	564	0.64%	New
Margin of victory		1,586	1.80%	−14.45%
Turnout		88,172	69.69%	2.40%
Registered electors		128,261		
AIADMK hold		Swing	4.08%	

=== 1977 ===
1977 Tamil Nadu Legislative Assembly election: Uthiramerur
Party	Candidate	Votes	%	±%
AIADMK	S. Pakkur Subramanyan	34,877	45.03%	New
DMK	K. M. Erajagopal	22,294	28.78%	−40.07
INC	C. Ramaswamy	9,647	12.45%	−15.81
JP	M. P. Radhakrishnan	8,641	11.16%	New
Independent	K. N. Kuppuswamy Gounder	1,998	2.58%	New
Margin of victory		12,583	16.25%	−24.34%
Turnout		77,457	67.29%	−8.30%
Registered electors		116,733		
AIADMK gain from DMK		Swing	-23.83%	

=== 1971 ===
1971 Tamil Nadu Legislative Assembly election: Uthiramerur
Party	Candidate	Votes	%	±%
DMK	K. M. Rajagopal	48,462	68.85%	+4.84
INC	C. Ramasamy	19,896	28.27%	−7.72
Independent	T. E. Pachaiyappan	2,027	2.88%	New
Margin of victory		28,566	40.59%	12.57%
Turnout		70,385	75.60%	−7.64%
Registered electors		96,108		
DMK hold		Swing	4.84%	

=== 1967 ===
1967 Madras Legislative Assembly election: Uthiramerur
Party	Candidate	Votes	%	±%
DMK	K. M. Rajagopal	47,689	64.01%	New
INC	O. S. Reddiar	26,814	35.99%	−17.72
Margin of victory		20,875	28.02%	12.92%
Turnout		74,503	83.23%	5.47%
Registered electors		92,974		
DMK gain from INC		Swing	10.30%	

=== 1962 ===
1962 Madras Legislative Assembly election: Uthiramerur
Party	Candidate	Votes	%	±%
INC	O. Srinivasa Reddiar	33,766	53.71%	+15.29
Independent	Doraswamy Naicker	24,276	38.61%	New
Independent	K. C. Deenadayalu Naidu	1,705	2.71%	New
Tamilnad Socialist Labour Party	T .G. Sundaramoorthy	1,421	2.26%	New
Independent	P. Muthumari Pillai	771	1.23%	New
SWA	Chinna Kannu Naicker	630	1.00%	New
Margin of victory		9,490	15.09%	12.26%
Turnout		62,871	77.76%	23.36%
Registered electors		84,188		
INC gain from Independent		Swing	12.46%	

=== 1957 ===
1957 Madras Legislative Assembly election: Uthiramerur
Party	Candidate	Votes	%	±%
Independent	V. K. Ramaswami Mudaliar	18,385	41.25%	New
INC	K. Duraiswamy Nayagar	17,122	38.42%	+2.03
Independent	Munuswamy	4,706	10.56%	New
Independent	S. Murugesa Mudaliar	3,416	7.66%	New
Independent	Jagannathan	939	2.11%	New
Margin of victory		1,263	2.83%	−7.40%
Turnout		44,568	54.40%	0.96%
Registered electors		81,928		
Independent gain from INC		Swing	4.86%	

=== 1952 ===
1952 Madras Legislative Assembly election: Uthiramerur
Party	Candidate	Votes	%	±%
INC	V. K. Ramaswami Mudaliar	13,144	36.39%	New
KMPP	Duraiswami Naicker	9,449	26.16%	New
RPI	Srinivasalu Naidu	8,192	22.68%	New
Independent	Jagannadan	2,698	7.47%	New
Independent	Singara Mudaliar	2,636	7.30%	New
Margin of victory		3,695	10.23%	
Turnout		36,119	53.44%	
Registered electors		67,590		
INC win (new seat)				
