= V. Jeyalakshmi =

Indian politician

V. Jeyalakshmi was an Indian politician and former Member of Parliament elected from Tamil Nadu. She was elected to the Lok Sabha from Sivakasi constituency as an Indian National Congress candidate in 1971, and 1977 elections.
