= O. V. Alagesan =

Indian politician

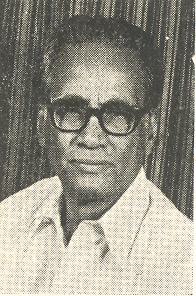

Member of Constituent Assembly of India
- In office 1946–1950
- Prime Minister: Jawaharlal Nehru

Member of parliament, Lok Sabha for Chengalpattu
- In office 1952–1957
- In office 1962–1967
- Prime Minister: Jawaharlal Nehru, Lal Bahadur Shastri, Indira Gandhi

Member of parliament, Lok Sabha for Tiruttani
- In office 1971–1977
- Prime Minister: Indira Gandhi

Member of parliament, Lok Sabha for Arakkonam
- In office 1977–1980
- Prime Minister: Morarji Desai, Charan Singh

India's Ambassador to Ethiopia
- In office 1968–1971
- Prime Minister: Indira Gandhi

Union Deputy Minister for Transport and Railways
- In office 1952–1957
- Prime Minister: Jawaharlal Nehru

Minister of State (Irrigation and Power) Fourth Nehru ministry
- In office May 1962 – July 1963
- Prime Minister: Jawaharlal Nehru

Minister of State (Mines and Fuel)
- In office July 1963 – November 1963
- Prime Minister: Jawaharlal Nehru

Minister of State (Petroleum and Chemicals)
- In office November 1963 – May 1964
- Prime Minister: Jawaharlal Nehru

Minister of State (Petroleum and Chemicals)
- In office June 1964 – January 1966
- Prime Minister: Lal Bahadur Shastri

Personal details
- Born: 6 September 1911 Ozhalur Village, Chengalpattu District
- Died: 3 January 1992 (aged 80)
- Party: Indian National Congress
- Spouse(s): Smt Pattammal, 1937
- Children: s. Vamanan d. Shyamala, Brinda and Urmila
- Education: Presidency College, Chennai
- Profession: agriculturist

Ozhalur Viswanatha Mudaliar Alagesan (6 September 1911 – 3 January 1992) was an Indian politician and freedom fighter from the Indian state of Tamil Nadu. He served as a Member of parliament, Lok Sabha from 1952 to 1957, 1962 to 1967 and from 1971 to 1980.

== Politics ==
Alagesan was a member of the Constituent Assembly and Provisional Parliament from 1946 to 1951. In 1952, he was elected Member of Parliament from Chingleput. He lost the elections in 1957 but was re-elected in 1962. He supported the anti Hindi agitation and opposed the Central Government's language policy. On 11 February 1965, he and C.Subramaniam two union ministers from Madras state, resigned protesting the Union government's language policy. After Shastri's assurances to Tamils that English would continue to be used for centre-state and intrastate communications and that the All India Civil Services examination would continue to be conducted in English, he and C.Subramaniam withdrew their resignations. He also served as a Member of Parliament from Tiruthani from 1971 to 1977 and Arakkonam from 1977 to 1980.

He was known for his work in social reform and administration.

Alagesan served as India's Ambassador to Ethiopia from 1968 to 1971.

== Indian Independence Movement ==
He took active part in the Indian Independence movement. He discontinued studies in 1930 to join Salt Satyagraha movement under the leadership of Mahatma Gandhi and suffered imprisonment; participated in (i) Civil Disobedience movement; (ii) Individual Satyagraha movement; (iii) Quit India movement; and was imprisoned for more than three years.

== Development of TamilNadu (earlier Madras) State ==
As Central Minister and member of Parliament, he was instrumental in getting the Madras Refineries, the Kalpakkam Nuclear Power Plant and, along with Dewan Bahadur Gopalaswamy Iyengar, the Integral Coach Factory, set up in Tamil Nadu. His contributions were acknowledged in a multi party function held to celebrate his centenary in 2011.

== Contribution to education ==
He was Founder-President of Bhaktavatsalam Educational Trust registered in 1958, which runs the following institutions; (i) Bhaktavalsalam Shastiabda Purthi High School, Athur; (ii) Bhaktavatsalam Polytechnic, Kancheepuram, (iii) Sarojini Varadappan Girls High School, Poonamalle, all in Chengalpatttu District; (iv) Brindavan Public School, Athur, Chengalpattu District, (v) a branch of the above school at Coonoor, Nilgiri District and (vi) another branch at Kodaikanal.

== Writings ==
Alagesan translated Jawaharlal Nehru 's Glimpses of World History into Tamil which was published as உலக சரித்திரம்(பாகம்1,2) by Alaigal Publishers அலைகள் வெளியீட்டகம்.

== Death ==
Alagesan died on 3 January 1992 at the age of 81.
