= 1971 Indian general election =

- 1–10 March 1971

518 of the 521 seats in the Lok Sabha 260 seats needed for a majority
- Registered: 274,189,132
- Turnout: 55.27% (▼5.77pp)
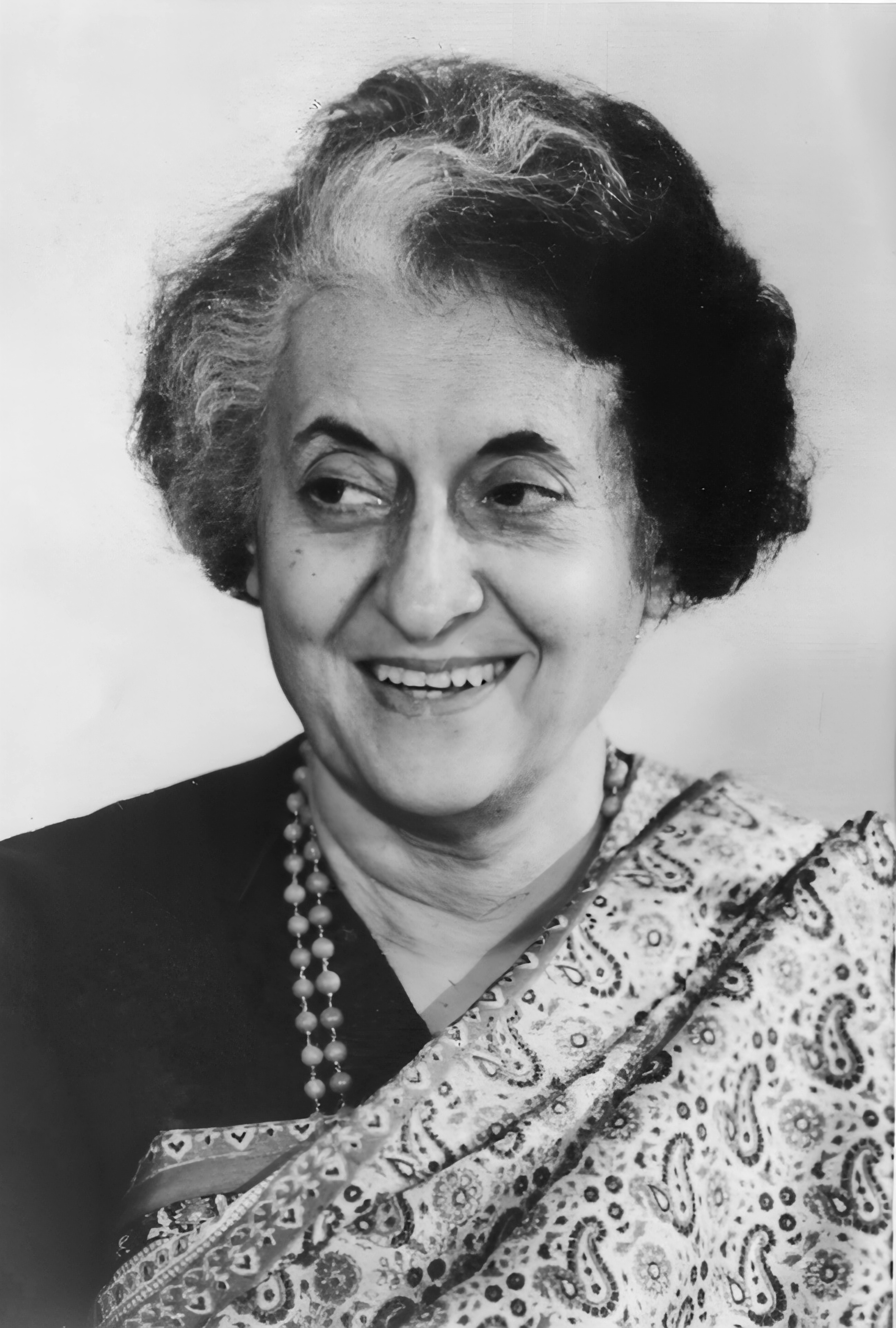

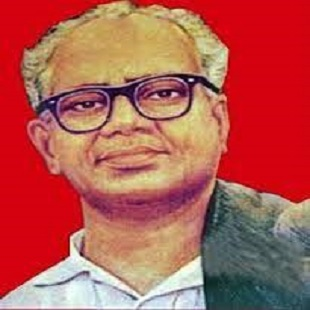

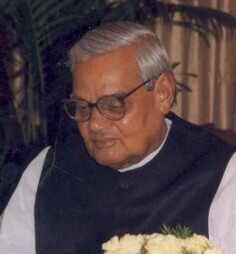

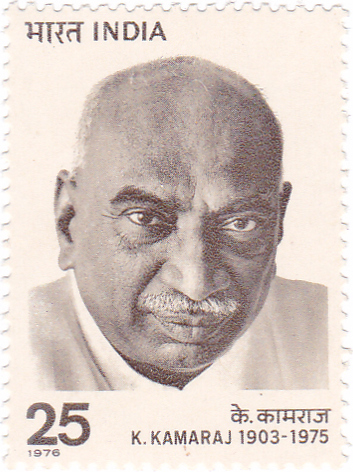
| | First party | Second party |
|---|---|---|
| Leader | Indira Gandhi | Puchalapalli Sundarayya |
| Party | INC(R) | CPI(M) |
| Last election | 40.78%, 283 seats | 4.28%, 12 seats |
| Seats won | 352 | 25 |
| Seat change | ▲69 | ▲6 |
| Popular vote | 64,033,274 | 7,510,089 |
| Percentage | 43.68% | 5.12% |
| Swing | ▲2.90pp | ▲0.84pp |
| | Third party | Fourth party |
| Leader | Atal Bihari Vajpayee | K. Kamaraj |
| Party | ABJS | Syndicate Congress |
| Alliance | Grand Alliance | Grand Alliance |
| Last election | 9.31%, 35 seats | – |
| Seats won | 22 | 16 |
| Seat change | ▼13 | New |
| Popular vote | 10,777,119 | 15,285,851 |
| Percentage | 7.35% | 10.43% |
| Swing | ▼1.96 pp | New |
- Results by constituency
Prime Minister before election
Indira Gandhi
INC(R)
Prime Minister after election
Indira Gandhi
INC(R)

General elections were held in India between 1 and 10 March 1971 to elect members of the fifth Lok Sabha. They were the fifth general elections since independence in 1947. Members were elected from 518 single-seat constituencies. Under the leadership of Indira Gandhi, the Indian National Congress (R) led a campaign which focused on reducing poverty and won a landslide victory, overcoming a split in the party and regaining many of the seats lost in the previous election.

== Background ==
=== Congress party split ===
During Indira Gandhi's previous term, there had been internal divisions in the Indian National Congress caused by various initiatives of her administration like nationalisation of banks, coal and steel, abolition of the privy purse and increasing closeness with the Soviet Union, steps that were considered to be too left-wing by the Congress high command consisting of centre-right leaders like Morarji Desai, K. Kamaraj, Atulya Ghosh, Neelam Sanjiva Reddy, S. K. Patil and others. In 1969 she was expelled from the party by party president S. Nijalingappa, causing a split. Most of the Congress MPs and grassroots support joined Gandhi's Indian National Congress (Requisitionists) faction, which was recognised by the Election Commission as being the successor to the previous party. 31 MPs who opposed Gandhi formed Indian National Congress (Organisation) party.

=== Minority government ===
The Second Indira Gandhi government, formed in November 1969 and dissolved in March 1971, was the first minority government in independent India. After the split, the INC(R) held 221 seats in the 523-seat parliament, 41 seats short of a majority. However, Gandhi and her cabinet remained in power by relying on support from left-wing parties like the Dravida Munnetra Kazhagam (26 seats), the Communist Party of India and its recently formed breakaway faction, the CPI(Marxist) (who together had 42 seats), giving the government a total of 289 seats, a comfortable majority and far more than the minimum of 262 seats required for a majority. Knowing that her minority government would eventually fall, on 27 December 1970, President V.V. Giri dissolved the Lok Sabha on the recommendation of Gandhi.

=== Opposition alliance ===
INC(O) formed a pre-poll alliance with Samyukta Socialist Party (SSP), Praja Socialist Party (PSP), the Swatantra Party and Bharatiya Jana Sangh (BJS) and several other regional parties opposed to the INC(R). They agreed to field a single joint candidate against the INC(R) candidate in every constituency in order to defeat Gandhi's party.

== Results ==
Despite the split, the ruling faction gained votes and seats to win a strong majority, while the Grand Alliance was badly trounced and lost more than half of their seats.

| Party | Votes | % | Seats | +/– |
|---|---|---|---|---|
| Indian National Congress (R) | 64,033,274 | 43.68 | 352 | +69 |
| Indian National Congress (Organisation) | 15,285,851 | 10.43 | 16 | New |
| Bharatiya Jana Sangh | 10,777,119 | 7.35 | 22 | –13 |
| Communist Party of India (Marxist) | 7,510,089 | 5.12 | 25 | +6 |
| Communist Party of India | 6,933,627 | 4.73 | 23 | 0 |
| Dravida Munnetra Kazhagam | 5,622,758 | 3.84 | 23 | –2 |
| Swatantra Party | 4,497,988 | 3.07 | 8 | –36 |
| Samyukta Socialist Party | 3,555,639 | 2.43 | 3 | –20 |
| Bharatiya Kranti Dal | 3,189,821 | 2.18 | 1 | New |
| Telangana Praja Samithi | 1,873,589 | 1.28 | 10 | New |
| Praja Socialist Party | 1,526,076 | 1.04 | 2 | –11 |
| Shiromani Akali Dal | 1,279,873 | 0.87 | 1 | New |
| Utkal Congress | 1,053,176 | 0.72 | 1 | New |
| All India Forward Bloc | 962,971 | 0.66 | 2 | 0 |
| Peasants and Workers Party of India | 741,535 | 0.51 | 0 | –2 |
| Revolutionary Socialist Party | 724,001 | 0.49 | 3 | New |
| Republican Party of India (Khobragade) | 542,662 | 0.37 | 0 | New |
| Kerala Congress | 542,431 | 0.37 | 3 | +3 |
| Bangla Congress | 518,781 | 0.35 | 1 | –4 |
| Indian Union Muslim League | 416,545 | 0.28 | 2 | 0 |
| Vishal Haryana Party | 352,514 | 0.24 | 1 | New |
| All India Jharkhand Party | 272,563 | 0.19 | 1 | New |
| Shiv Sena | 227,468 | 0.16 | 0 | New |
| Shoshit Dal Bihar | 193,389 | 0.13 | 0 | New |
| Socialist Unity Centre of India | 157,703 | 0.11 | 0 | New |
| Republican Party of India | 153,794 | 0.10 | 1 | 0 |
| Janta Party | 139,091 | 0.09 | 0 | New |
| All Party Hill Leaders Conference | 90,772 | 0.06 | 1 | 0 |
| United Front of Nagaland | 89,514 | 0.06 | 1 | New |
| Hindu Mahasabha | 73,191 | 0.05 | 0 | New |
| Akhil Bharatiya Gorkha League | 72,131 | 0.05 | 0 | New |
| Bihar Prant Hul Jharkhand | 66,669 | 0.05 | 0 | New |
| Hindustani Shoshit Dal | 65,925 | 0.04 | 0 | New |
| Revolutionary Communist Party of India | 65,622 | 0.04 | 0 | New |
| Lok Sewak Sangh | 62,527 | 0.04 | 0 | New |
| Jana Congress | 60,103 | 0.04 | 0 | 0 |
| Nagaland Nationalist Organisation | 58,511 | 0.04 | 0 | –1 |
| United Goans – Seqveria Group | 58,401 | 0.04 | 1 | 0 |
| Socialist Party | 55,064 | 0.04 | 0 | New |
| Maharashtrawadi Gomantak Party | 54,597 | 0.04 | 0 | New |
| Proutist Bloc of India | 43,849 | 0.03 | 0 | New |
| Telangana Congress | 43,548 | 0.03 | 0 | New |
| Minorities Labour Party | 41,198 | 0.03 | 0 | New |
| Indian Socialist Party | 38,713 | 0.03 | 0 | New |
| Muslim Majlis Uttar Pradesh | 36,526 | 0.02 | 0 | New |
| Lok Raj Party Himachal Pradesh | 34,070 | 0.02 | 0 | New |
| Uttar Pradesh Kisan Mazdoor Party | 31,729 | 0.02 | 0 | New |
| Manipur Peoples Party | 31,029 | 0.02 | 0 | New |
| Akhil Bharatiya Ram Rajya Parishad | 24,093 | 0.02 | 0 | New |
| Republican Party of India (Ambedkarite) | 22,428 | 0.02 | 0 | New |
| Backward Classes Mahasabha | 6,929 | 0.00 | 0 | New |
| Revolutionary Socialist Party of India (Marxist–Leninist) | 6,198 | 0.00 | 0 | New |
| Chota Nagpur Bhumi Rakshak Party | 4,982 | 0.00 | 0 | New |
| Independents | 12,279,629 | 8.38 | 14 | –21 |
| Appointed members (Note: Two representing Anglo-Indians and one representing the North-East Frontier Agency.) | | | 3 | 0 |
| Total | 146,602,276 | 100.00 | 521 | –2 |
| Valid votes | 146,602,276 | 96.74 | | |
| Invalid/blank votes | 4,934,526 | 3.26 | | |
| Total votes | 151,536,802 | 100.00 | | |
| Registered voters/turnout | 274,189,132 | 55.27 | | |
Source: ECI

=== Results by state ===
| State | Total seats | Seats won | | | | | | | | | | | | | |
| State | Total seats | INC (R) | CPM | CPI | DMK | BJS | INC (O) | TPS | SWA | SSP | PSP | BKD | Others | Ind. | App. |
|---|---|---|---|---|---|---|---|---|---|---|---|---|---|---|---|
| Andaman and Nicobar Islands | 1 | 1 | | | | | | | | | | | | | |
| Andhra Pradesh | 41 | 28 | 1 | 1 | | | | 10 | | | | | | 1 | |
| Assam | 14 | 13 | | | | | | | | | | | 1 | | |
| Bihar | 53 | 39 | | 5 | | 2 | 3 | | | 2 | | | 1 | 1 | |
| Chandigarh | 1 | 1 | | | | | | | | | | | | | |
| Dadra and Nagar Haveli | 1 | 1 | | | | | | | | | | | | | |
| Delhi | 7 | 7 | | | | | | | | | | | | | |
| Goa, Daman and Diu | 2 | 1 | | | | | | | | | | | 1 | | |
| Gujarat | 24 | 11 | | | | | 11 | | 2 | | | | | | |
| Haryana | 9 | 7 | | | | 1 | | | | | | | 1 | | |
| Himachal Pradesh | 4 | 4 | | | | | | | | | | | | | |
| Jammu and Kashmir | 6 | 5 | | | | | | | | | | | | 1 | |
| Kerala | 19 | 6 | 2 | 3 | | | | | | | | | 7 | 1 | |
| Laccadive, Minicoy, and Amindivi Islands | 1 | 1 | | | | | | | | | | | | | |
| Madhya Pradesh | 37 | 21 | | | | 11 | | | | 1 | | | | 4 | |
| Maharashtra | 45 | 42 | | | | | | | | | 1 | | 2 | | |
| Manipur | 2 | 2 | | | | | | | | | | | | | |
| Mysore | 27 | 27 | | | | | | | | | | | | | |
| Nagaland | 1 | | | | | | | | | | | | 1 | | |
| North-East Frontier Agency | 1 | | | | | | | | | | | | | | 1 |
| Orissa | 20 | 15 | | 1 | | | | | 3 | | | | 1 | | |
| Punjab | 13 | 10 | | 2 | | | | | | | | | 1 | | |
| Pondicherry | 1 | 1 | | | | | | | | | | | | | |
| Rajasthan | 23 | 14 | | | | 4 | | | 3 | | | | | 2 | |
| Tamil Nadu | 39 | 9 | | 4 | 23 | | 1 | | | | | | 1 | 1 | |
| Tripura | 2 | | 2 | | | | | | | | | | | | |
| Uttar Pradesh | 85 | 73 | | 4 | | 4 | 1 | | | | | 1 | | 2 | |
| West Bengal | 40 | 13 | 20 | 3 | | | | | | | 1 | | 2 | 1 | |
| Anglo-Indians | 2 | | | | | | | | | | | | | | 2 |
| Total | 521 | 352 | 25 | 23 | 23 | 22 | 16 | 10 | 8 | 3 | 2 | 1 | 19 | 14 | 3 |
Source: ECI

=== State wise Detailed ===
| State (# of seats) | Party | Seats contested | Seats won | % of votes | | |
|---|---|---|---|---|---|---|
| Andhra Pradesh(41) | Party | | Indian National Congress (R) | 37 | 28 | 55.73 |
| Andhra Pradesh(41) | Telangana Praja Samithi | 14 | 10 | 14.33 | | |
| Andhra Pradesh(41) | Communist Party Of India | 11 | 1 | 5.94 | | |
| Andhra Pradesh(41) | Communist Party of India (Marxist) | 5 | 1 | 2.82 | | |
| Andhra Pradesh(41) | Independent | 93 | 1 | 8.21 | | |
| Andhra Pradesh(41) | Indian National Congress (Organisation) | 12 | 0 | 5.55 | | |
| Assam(14) | Indian National Congress (R) | 13 | 13 | 56.98 | | |
| Assam(14) | All Party Hill Leaders Conference | 1 | 1 | 3.0 | | |
| Assam(14) | Communist Party Of India | 5 | 0 | 5.65 | | |
| Assam(14) | Praja Socialist Party | 5 | 0 | 4.56 | | |
| Assam(14) | Independent | 31 | 0 | 17.92 | | |
| Bihar(53) | Indian National Congress (R) | 47 | 39 | 40.06 | | |
| Bihar(53) | Communist Party of India | 17 | 5 | 9.85 | | |
| Bihar(53) | Indian National Congress (Organisation) | 24 | 3 | 11.51 | | |
| Bihar(53) | Bharatiya Jana Sangh | 28 | 2 | 12.1 | | |
| Bihar(53) | Samyukta Socialist Party | 28 | 2 | 9.47 | | |
| Bihar(53) | Independent | 183 | 1 | 9.11 | | |
| Gujarat(24) | Indian National Congress (R) | 23 | 11 | 44.85 | | |
| Gujarat(24) | Indian National Congress (Organisation) | 19 | 11 | 39.70 | | |
| Gujarat(24) | Swatantra Party | 4 | 2 | 5.46 | | |
| Haryana(9) | Indian National Congress (R) | 9 | 7 | 52.56 | | |
| Haryana(9) | Bharatiya Jana Sangh | 3 | 1 | 11.19 | | |
| Haryana(9) | Vishal Haryana Party | 3 | 1 | 9.16 | | |
| Haryana(9) | Indian National Congress (Organisation) | 4 | 0 | 11.34 | | |
| Jammu & Kashmir(6) | Indian National Congress (R) | 6 | 5 | 54.06 | | |
| Jammu & Kashmir(6) | Independent | 20 | 1 | 32.17 | | |
| Jammu & Kashmir(6) | Bharatiya Jana Sangh | 3 | 0 | 12.23 | | |
| Kerala(19) | Indian National Congress (R) | 7 | 6 | 19.75 | | |
| Kerala(19) | Communist Party of India | 3 | 3 | 9.09 | | |
| Kerala(19) | Kerala Congress | 3 | 3 | 8.31 | | |
| Kerala(19) | Communist Party of India (Marxist) | 11 | 2 | 26.21 | | |
| Kerala(19) | Revolutionary Socialist Party | 2 | 2 | 6.43 | | |
| Kerala(19) | Muslim League | 2 | 2 | 5.62 | | |
| Kerala(19) | Independent | 27 | 1 | 17.97 | | |
| Madhya Pradesh(37) | Indian National Congress (R) | 36 | 21 | 45.60 | | |
| Madhya Pradesh(37) | Bharatiya Jana Sangh | 28 | 11 | 33.56 | | |
| Madhya Pradesh(37) | Independent | 73 | 4 | 13.93 | | |
| Madhya Pradesh(37) | Samyukta Socialist Party | 5 | 1 | 1.57 | | |
| Maharashtra(45) | Indian National Congress (R) | 44 | 42 | 63.18 | | |
| Maharashtra(45) | All India Forward Bloc | 3 | 1 | 2.47 | | |
| Maharashtra(45) | Praja Socialist Party | 8 | 1 | 1.68 | | |
| Maharashtra(45) | Republican Party Of India | 1 | 1 | 1.11 | | |
| Maharashtra(45) | Bharatiya Jana Sangh | 13 | 0 | 5.23 | | |
| Maharashtra(45) | Peasants And Workers Party Of India | 12 | 0 | 5.33 | | |
| Mysore(27) | Indian National Congress (R) | 27 | 27 | 70.87 | | |
| Mysore(27) | Indian National Congress (Organisation) | 17 | 0 | 16.36 | | |
| Orissa(20) | Indian National Congress (R) | 19 | 15 | 38.46 | | |
| Orissa(20) | Swatantra Party | 13 | 3 | 15.91 | | |
| Orissa(20) | Utkal Congress | 20 | 1 | 23.6 | | |
| Orissa(20) | Communist Party of India | 3 | 1 | 4.31 | | |
| Punjab(13) | Indian National Congress (R) | 11 | 10 | 45.96 | | |
| Punjab(13) | Communist Party of India | 2 | 2 | 6.22 | | |
| Punjab(13) | Shiromani Akali Dal | 12 | 1 | 30.85 | | |
| Rajasthan(23) | Indian National Congress (R) | 23 | 14 | 50.35 | | |
| Rajasthan(23) | Bharatiya Jana Sangh | 7 | 4 | 12.38 | | |
| Rajasthan(23) | Swatantra Party | 8 | 3 | 14.64 | | |
| Rajasthan(23) | Independent | 71 | 2 | 12.34 | | |
| Tamil Nadu(39) | Dravida Munnetra Kazhagam | 24 | 23 | 35.25 | | |
| Tamil Nadu(39) | Indian National Congress (R) | 9 | 9 | 12.51 | | |
| Tamil Nadu(39) | Communist Party of India | 4 | 4 | 5.43 | | |
| Tamil Nadu(39) | Indian National Congress (Organisation) | 29 | 1 | 30.43 | | |
| Tamil Nadu(39) | Independent | 27 | 1 | 3.24 | | |
| Tamil Nadu(39) | All India Forward Bloc | 1 | 1 | 1.31 | | |
| Uttar Pradesh(85) | Indian National Congress (R) | 78 | 73 | 48.54 | | |
| Uttar Pradesh(85) | Bharatiya Jana Sangh | 37 | 4 | 12.23 | | |
| Uttar Pradesh(85) | Communist Party of India | 9 | 4 | 3.7 | | |
| Uttar Pradesh(85) | Independent | 231 | 2 | 8.4 | | |
| Uttar Pradesh(85) | Bharatiya Kranti Dal | 67 | 1 | 12.70 | | |
| Uttar Pradesh(85) | Indian National Congress (Organisation) | 44 | 1 | 8.6 | | |
| Uttar Pradesh(85) | Samyukta Socialist Party | 25 | 0 | 4.1 | | |
| West Bengal(40) | Communist Party of India (Marxist) | 38 | 20 | 34.29 | | |
| West Bengal(40) | Indian National Congress (R) | 31 | 13 | 28.2 | | |
| West Bengal(40) | Communist Party Of India | 15 | 3 | 10.54 | | |
| West Bengal(40) | Independent | 28 | 1 | 5.79 | | |
| West Bengal(40) | Bangla Congress | 14 | 1 | 3.97 | | |
| West Bengal(40) | Revolutionary Socialist Party | 5 | 1 | 2.04 | | |
| West Bengal(40) | Praja Socialist Party | 3 | 1 | 1.29 | | |
| West Bengal(40) | All India Forward Bloc | 10 | 0 | 2.7 | | |
Source:ECI

== Aftermath ==
On 12 June 1975 the Allahabad High Court invalidated the result in Gandhi's constituency on the grounds of electoral malpractices. Instead of resigning, Indira Gandhi called a state of emergency, suspending democracy and outlawed political opposition. After democracy was restored in 1977, the opposition Congress faction formed a coalition of parties called the Janata Party, which inflicted the Congress's first electoral defeat.

== See also ==
- List of members of the 5th Lok Sabha
- 1971 Indian general election by state or union territory
- 1969 Indian presidential election
