= Grand Alliance (1971) =

Former political alliance in India

The Grand Alliance of 1971 was a pre-poll alliance forged between Indian National Congress (Organisation), Samyukta Socialist Party, Praja Socialist Party, Swatantra party and Bharatiya Jana Sangh ahead of the 1971 Indian general election. The alliance was led by K. Kamaraj's INC (O) faction against Indira Gandhi's INC (R) faction. However, in the end INC (R) won the election.

The rallying cry of the alliance was Indira Hatao (unseat Indira). Indira Gandhi's INC (R) came up with the slogan Garibi Hatao (eradicate poverty), in response to this.
