= Kanchi Panneerselvam =

Indian politician

Kanchi Panneerselvam is an Indian politician and former Member of Parliament elected from Tamil Nadu. He was elected to the Lok Sabha from Chengalpattu constituency as an Anna Dravida Munnetra Kazhagam candidate in 1989 and 1998 elections.

He also served as a Member of the Legislative Assembly of Tamil Nadu. He was elected to the Tamil Nadu legislative assembly as an Anna Dravida Munnetra Kazhagam candidate from Uthiramerur constituency in 1991 election.
