= Nathanallur =

- Village
- Location in Tamil Nadu, India
- Coordinates: 12°48′9.79″N 79°50′41.42″E
- Country: India
- State: Tamil Nadu
- District: Kanchipuram district
- Taluk: Walajabad taluk

Government
  - Village Panchayat President: Mani.V

Area
  - Total: 5.18 km^{2} (2.00 sq mi)
- Elevation: 64 m (210 ft)

Population (2011)
  - Total: 2,158
  - Density: 436/km^{2} (1,130/sq mi)
- Time zone: UTC+5:30 (IST)
- Pincode: 631605
- Area code: +91-44
- Vehicle registration: TN 21
- Official language: Tamil
- Spoken languages: Tamil, English

Nathanallur is a small village in Walajabad taluk, Kanchipuram district, Tamil Nadu, India. Tamil Nadu state highway 48 passes through Nathanallur village. Nathanallur is 5.5 kilometres (3.4 mi) from its Walajabad taluk and town, 20.9 kilometres (13.0 mi) from its main city district Kanchipuram, and 67.1 kilometres (41.7 mi) distance from its main state city Chennai.

== History of Nathanallur ==
The village people believes that the name Nathanallur originated by the great poet Mr. Nanthanar. Nathanallur includes a sub village called Madura Nallur (மதுரா நல்லூர்), more commonly known as Nellur. Nellur people migrated from Nathanallur early on to cultivate the land.

== Festivals in Nathanallur ==
There are many temples in Nathanallur. Carnivals are celebrated for each temple in different periods.

List of popularly known temple are below.

- Ellamman Temple (எல்லம்மன் ஆலயம்)
- Perumal Temple (பெருமாள் ஆலயம்)
- Many Vinayakar Temples (விநாயகர் ஆலயம்)
- Gangaiamman Temple (கங்கையம்மன் ஆலயம்)
- Durgaiamman Temple (துர்கையம்மன் ஆலயம்)
- Selliamman Temple (செல்லியம்மன் ஆலயம்)
- Adanjiamman Temple (அடைஞ்சியம்மன் ஆலயம்)
- Periyandavar Temple (பெரியாண்டவர் ஆலயம்) and many more.

=== Sri Devi Ellamman Temple ===
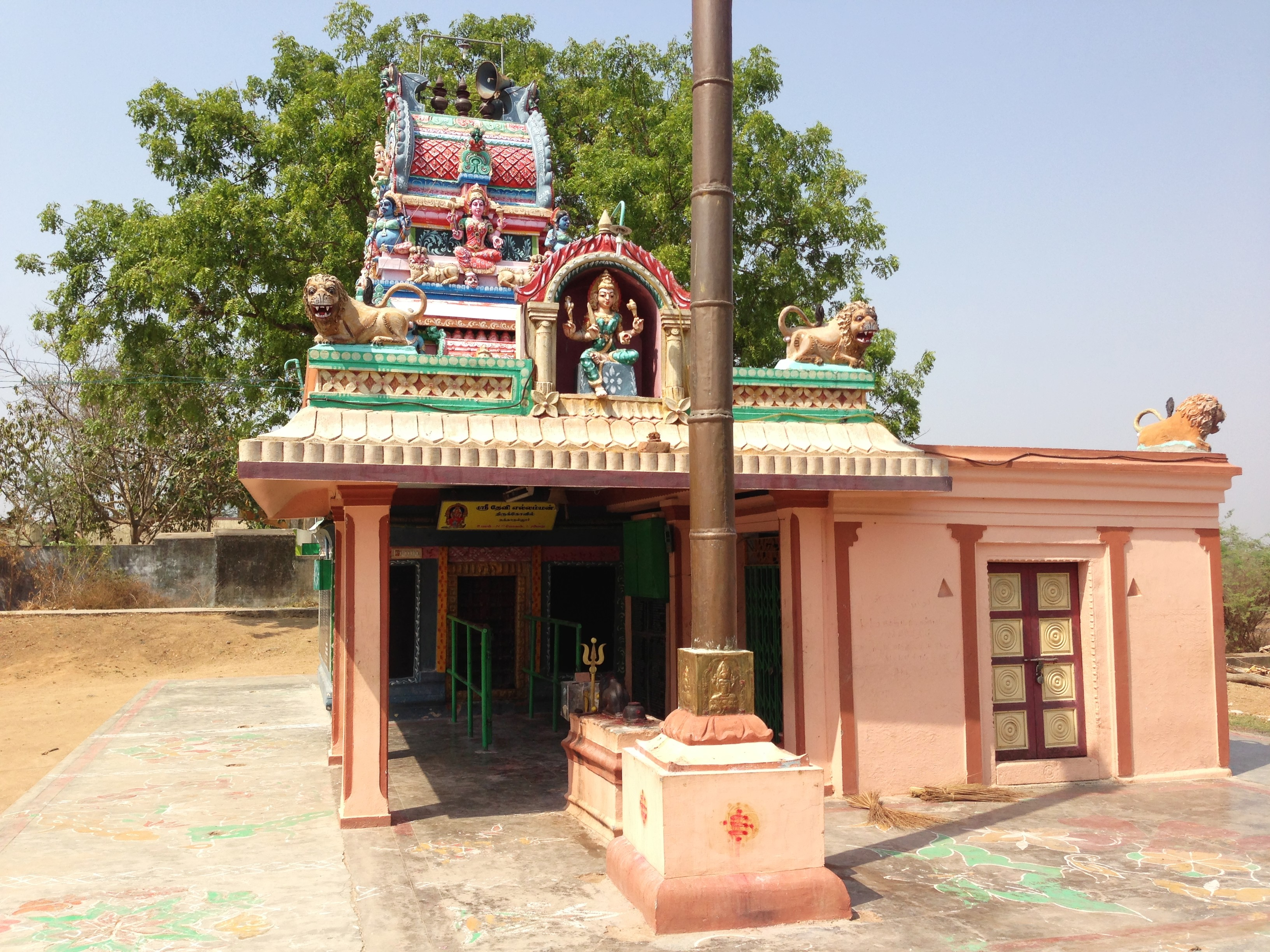
Sri Devi Ellamman Temple Front View

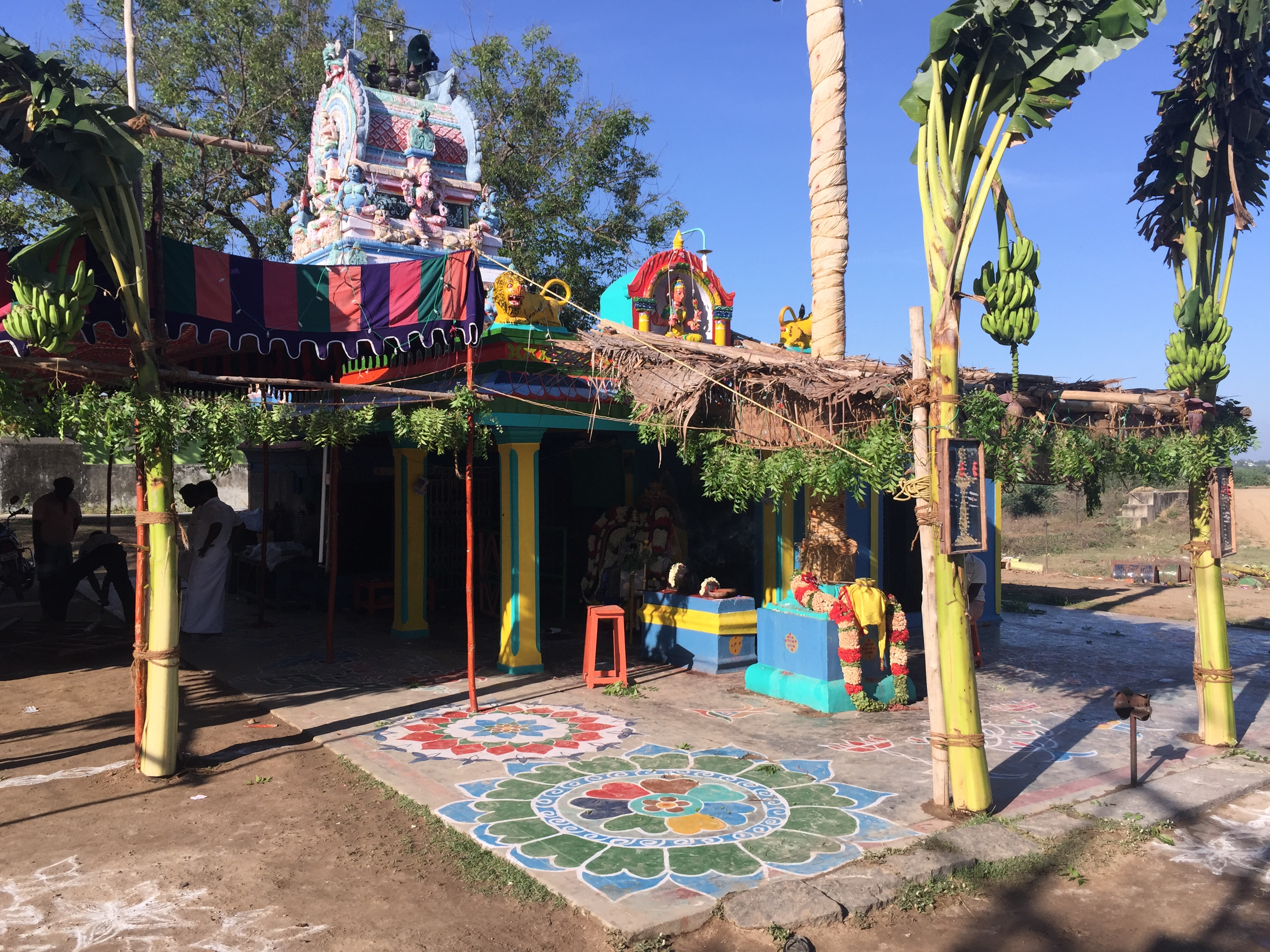
Sri Devi Ellamman Temple Front during Festival

Every year during the Tamil month Chithirai (சித்திரை), first amavasya, a famous 10 day festival called Float Festival (தெப்ப உற்சவ திருவிழா) is celebrated for the deity Ellamman.

During the first nine days, the lord is decorated with ornaments and flowers, and rides around the village in a Bullock Cart. Each day, a different avatar is shown to the village pilgrims.

On the 10th day, amavasya, the carnival becomes more grand. All villagers and locals from nearby cities and towns gather near the theppakulam at Ellamman temple. The deity Lord Sri Devi Ellamman is decorated with ornaments and flowers, and Amman swings on an oonjal. Next, the deity is transferred to a boat to circle around Theppakulam. Fireworks displays are used. The next day, the carnival concludes with stage dramas (தெருக்கூத்து). During this festival, many other Hindu spiritual activities occur as well.

==== Float Festival Gallery ====
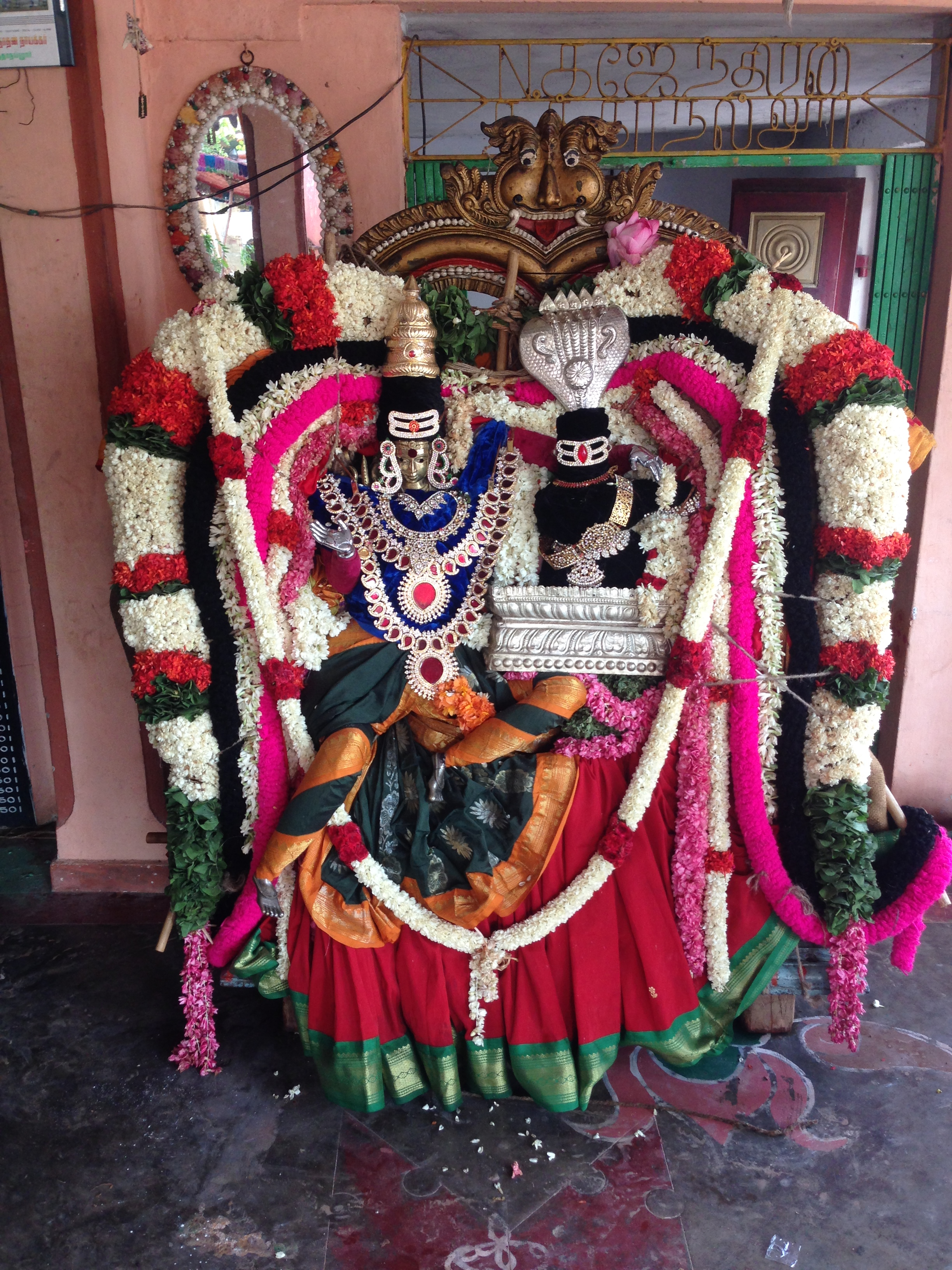
Sri Parvathiyammal

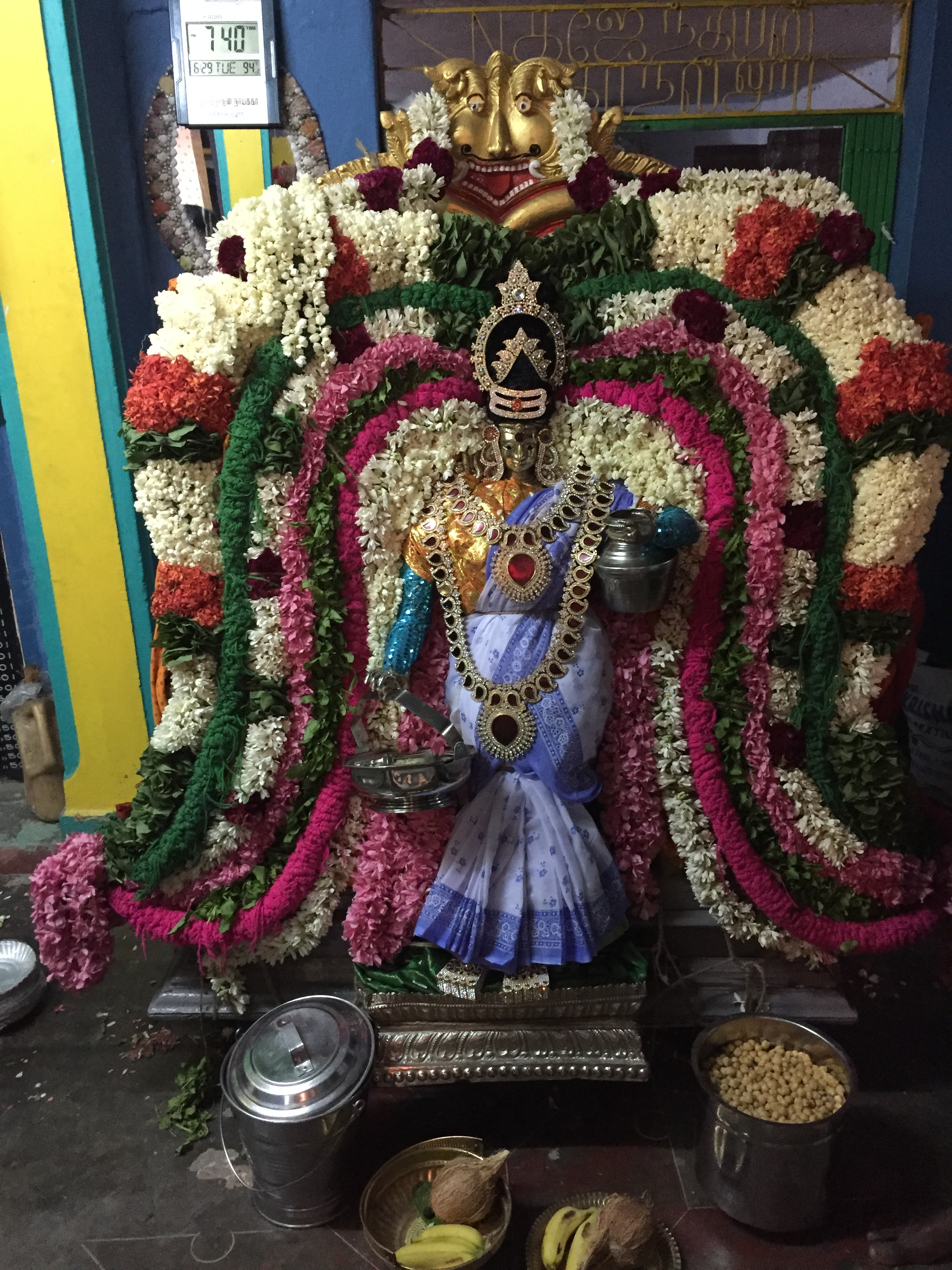
Sri Renuka Parameshwari Amman

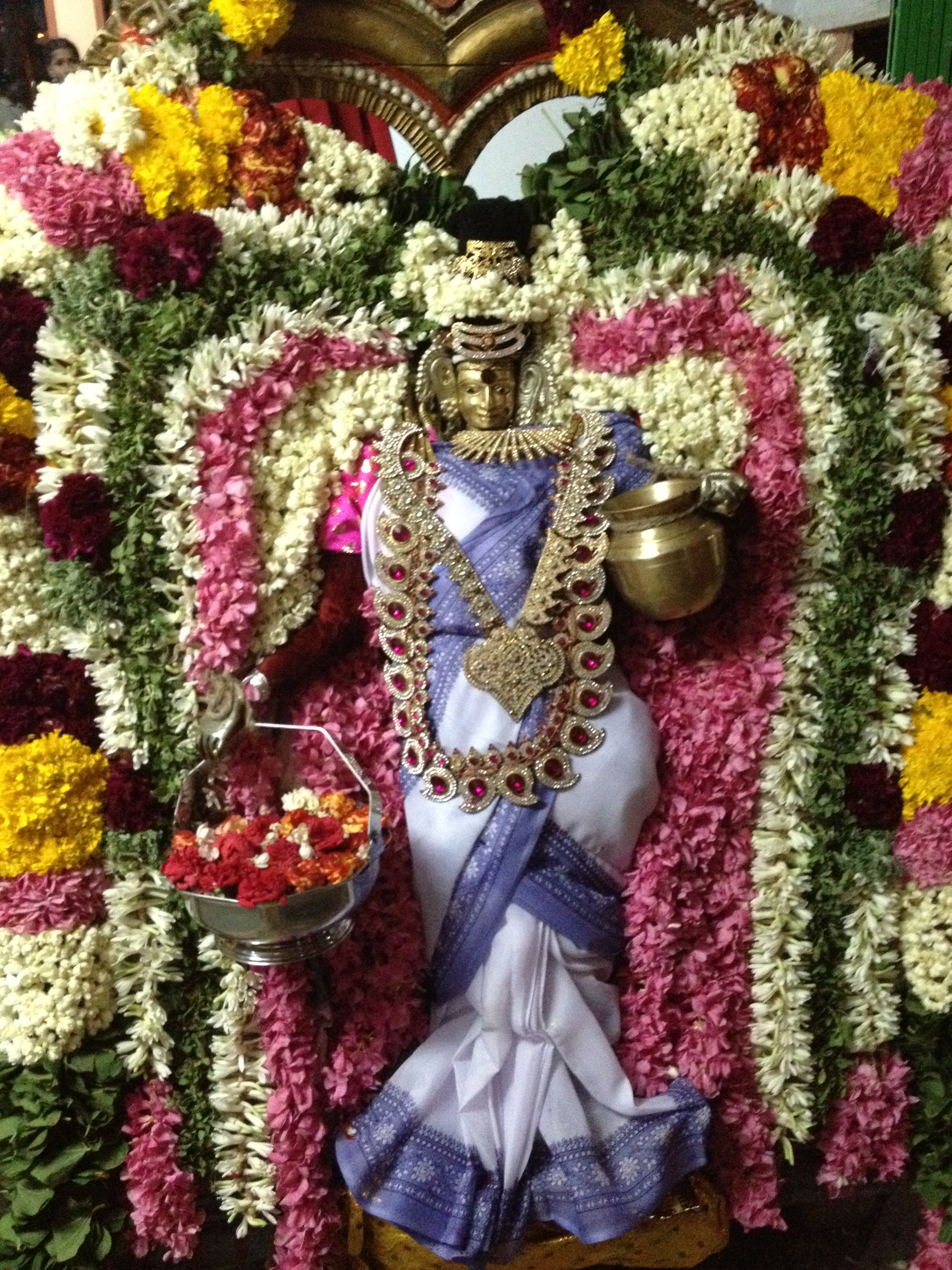
Sri Renuka Parameshwari Amman

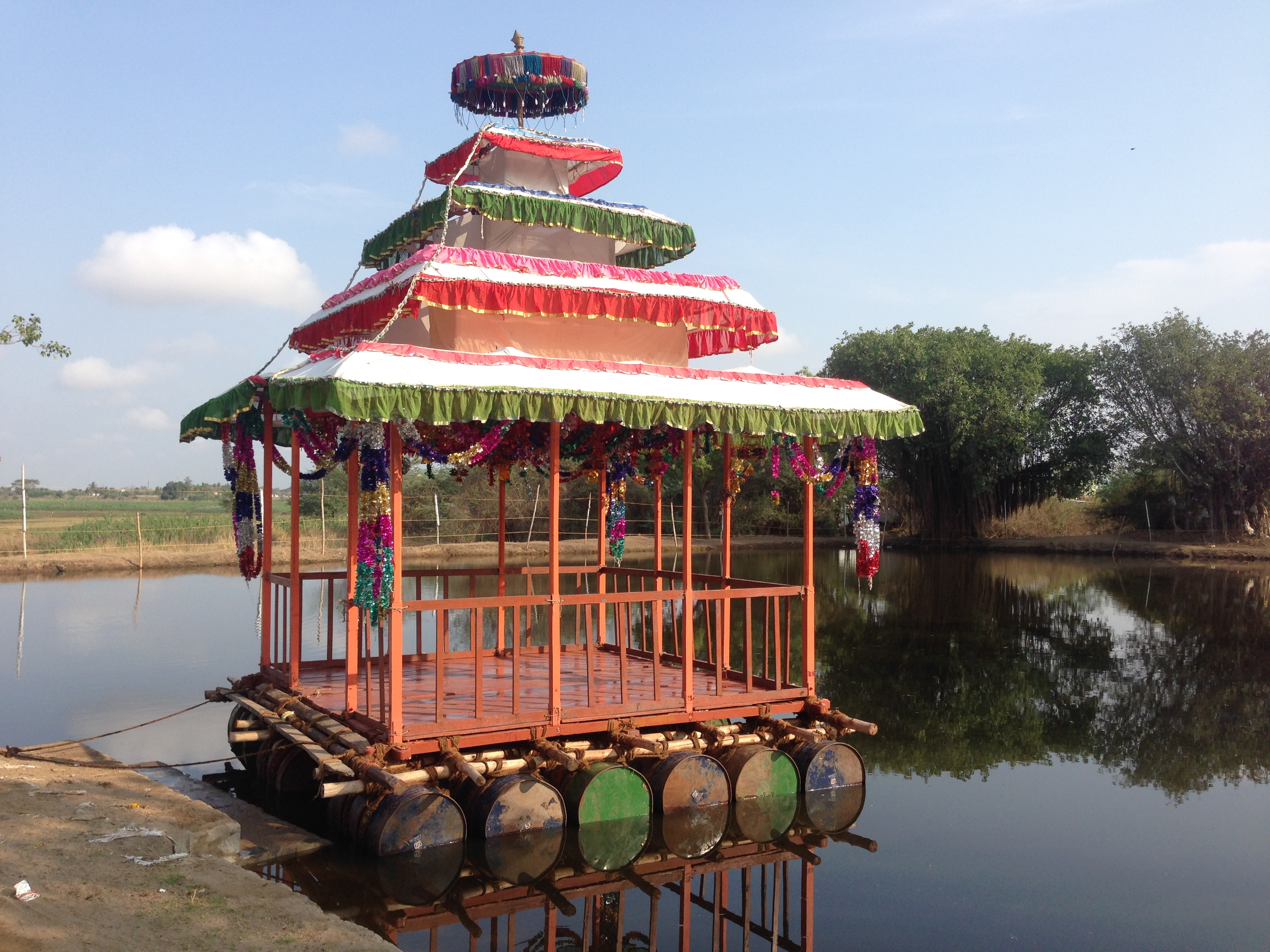
Nathanallur Ellamman Theppam 2014

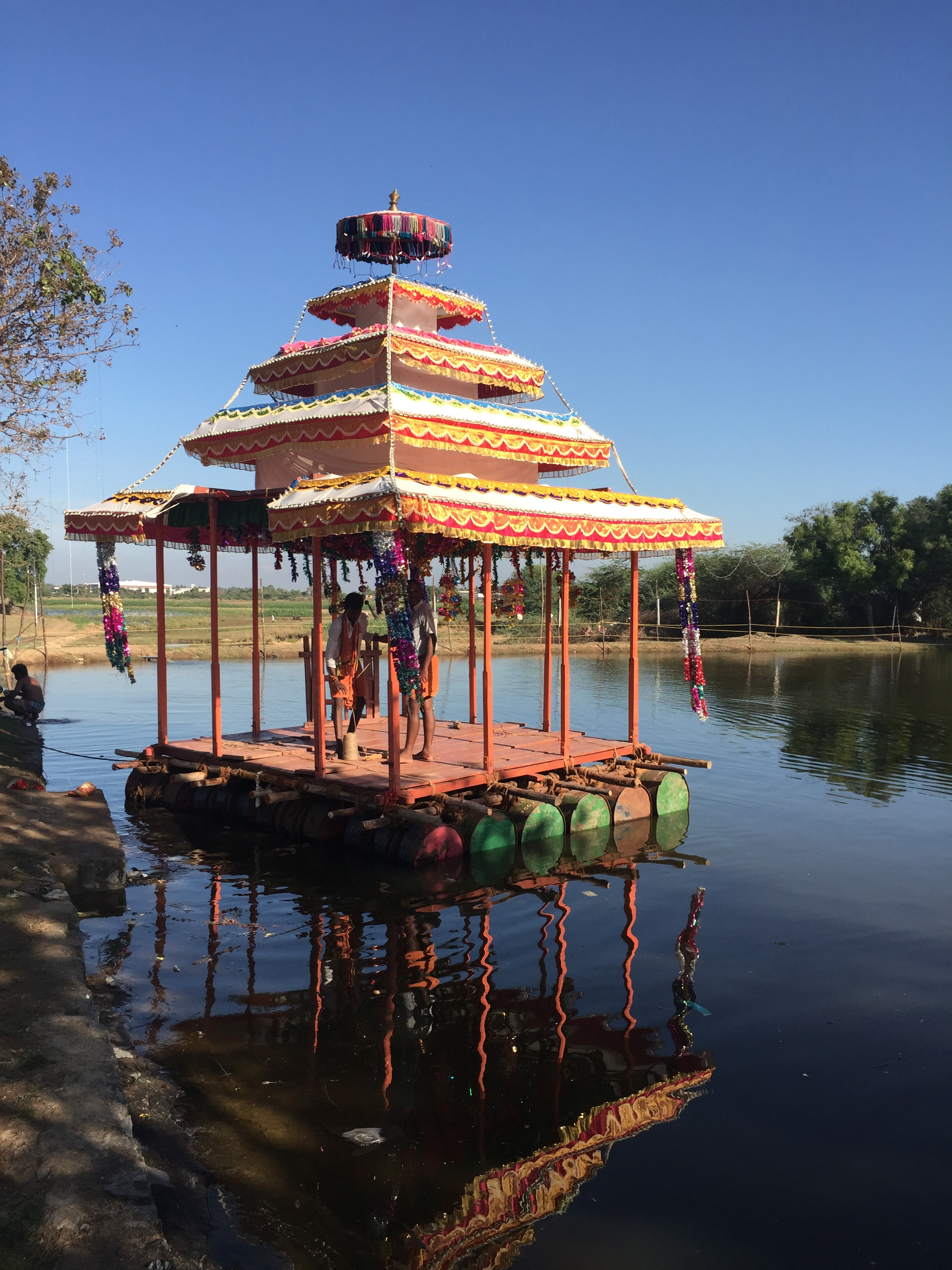
Nathanallur Ellamman Theppam 2015

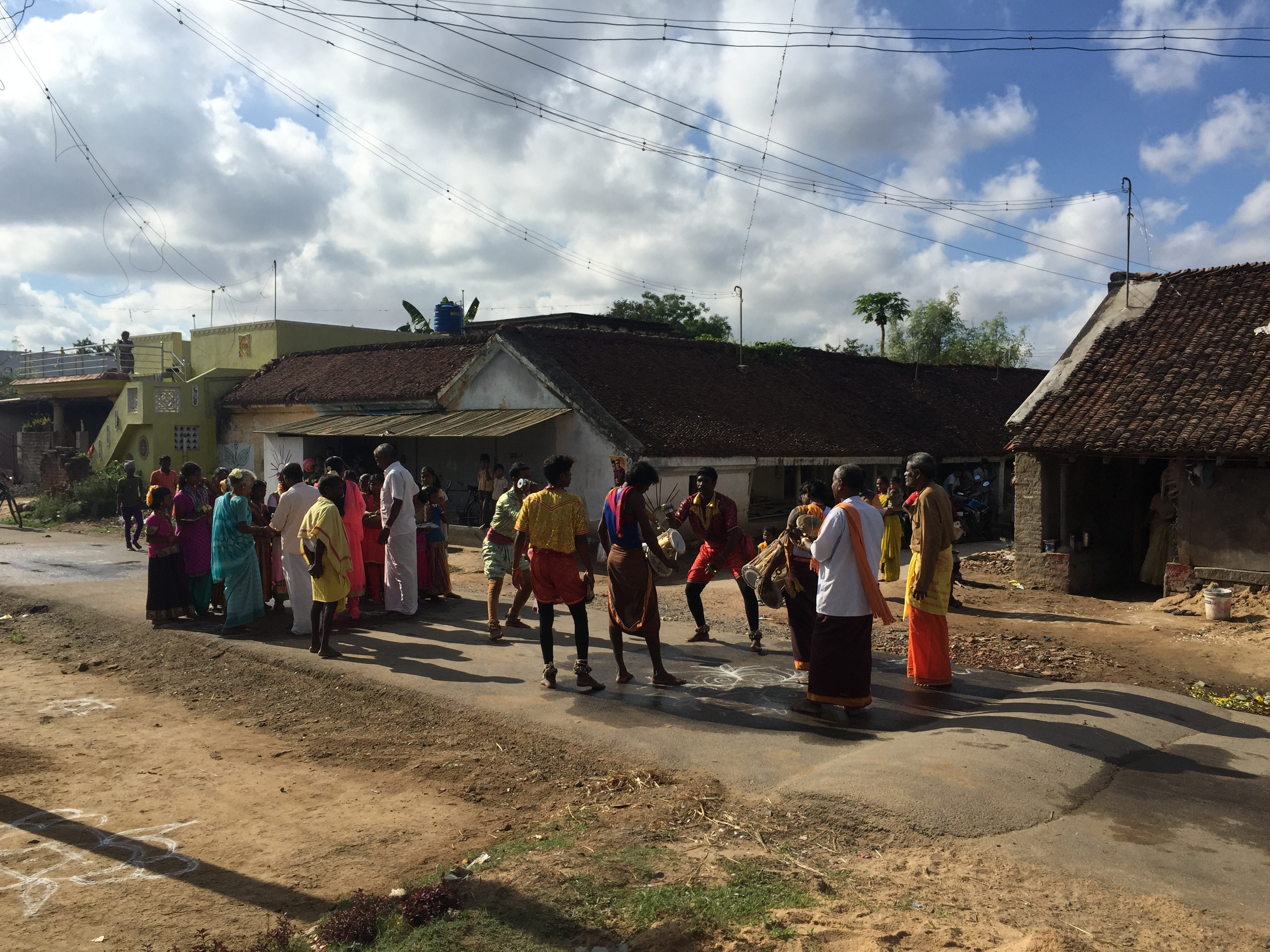
Nathanallur Ellamman Varisai

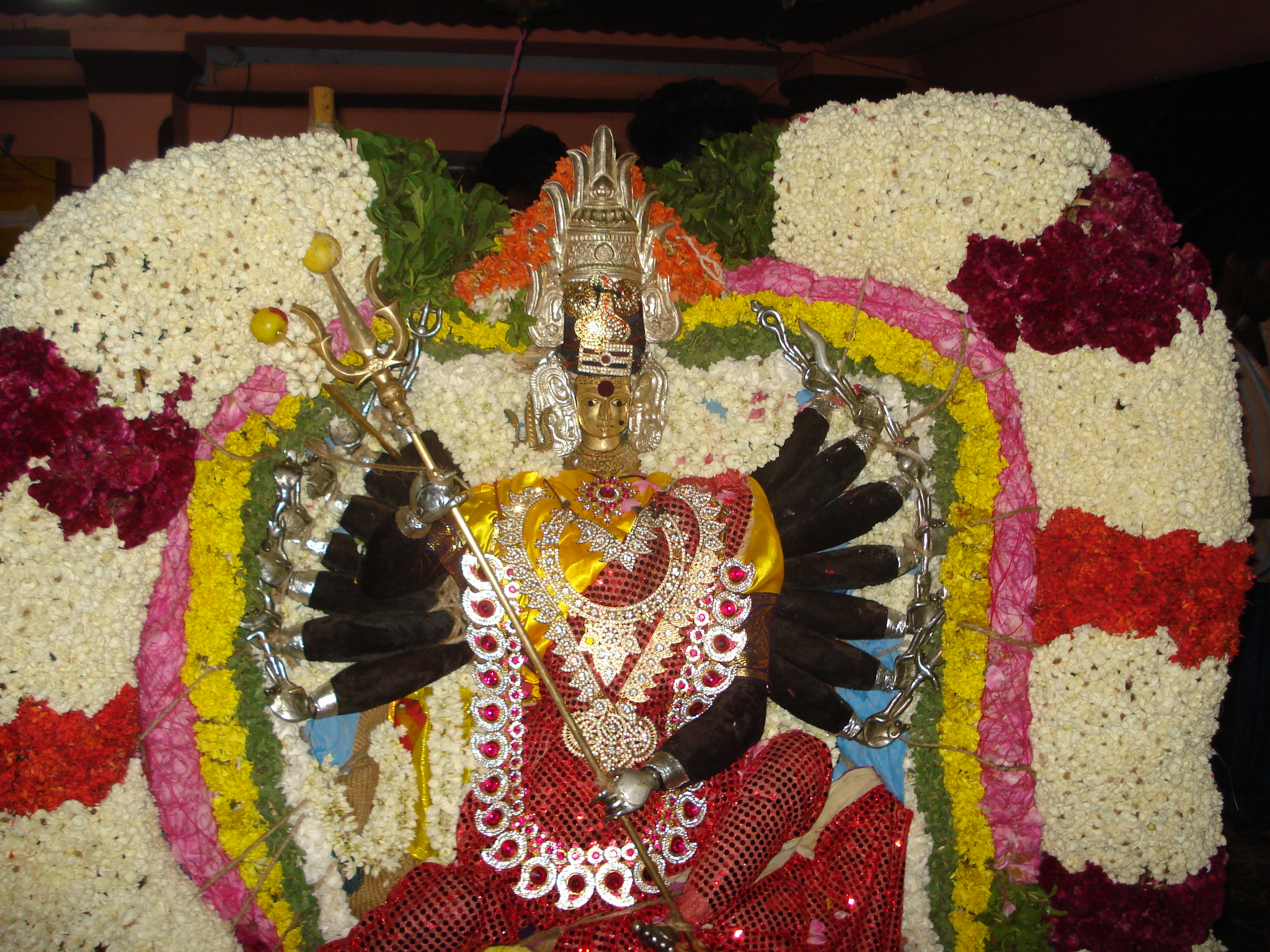
Decorated Sri Devi Ellamman

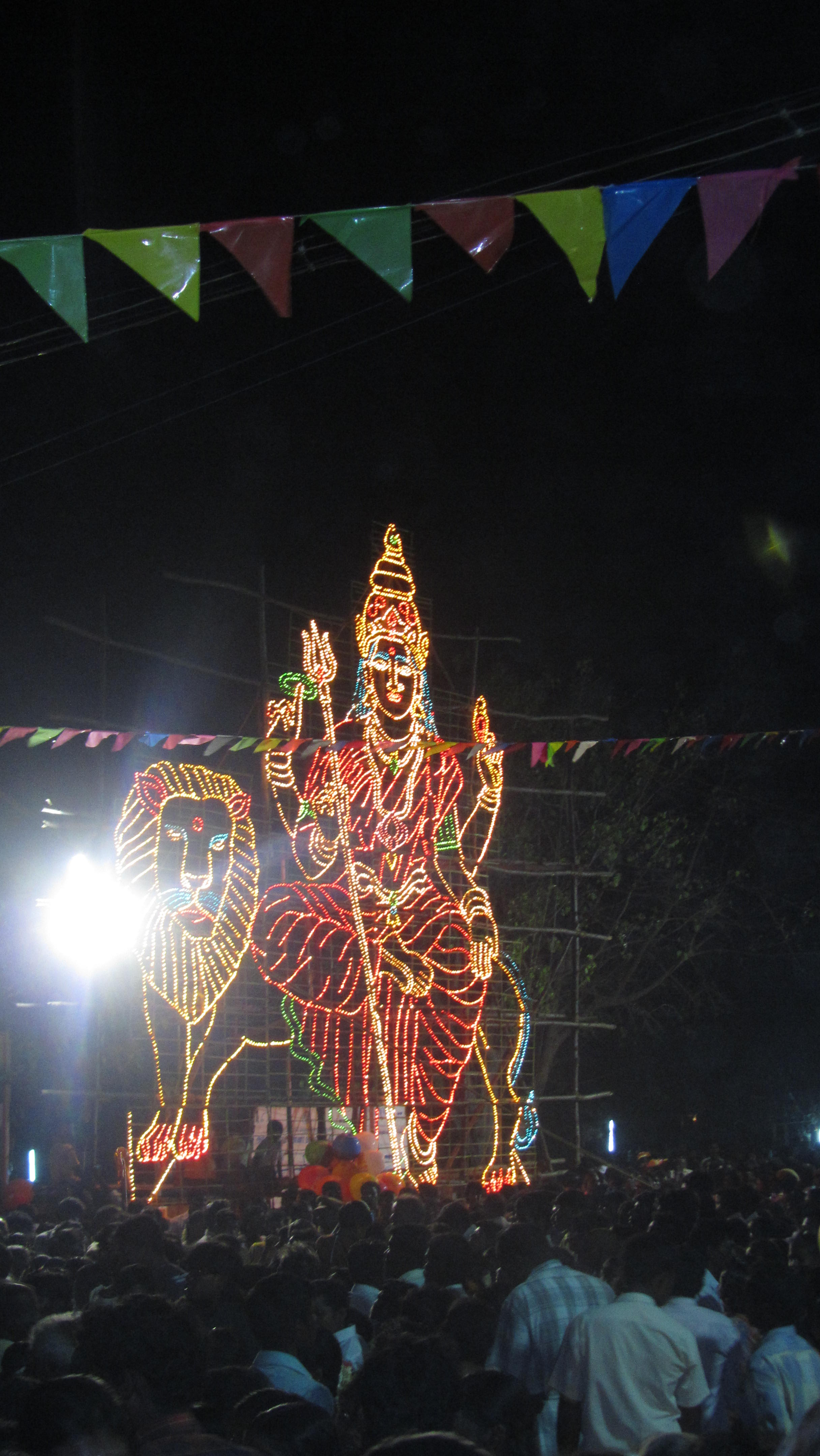
Sri Devi Ellamman with lightings

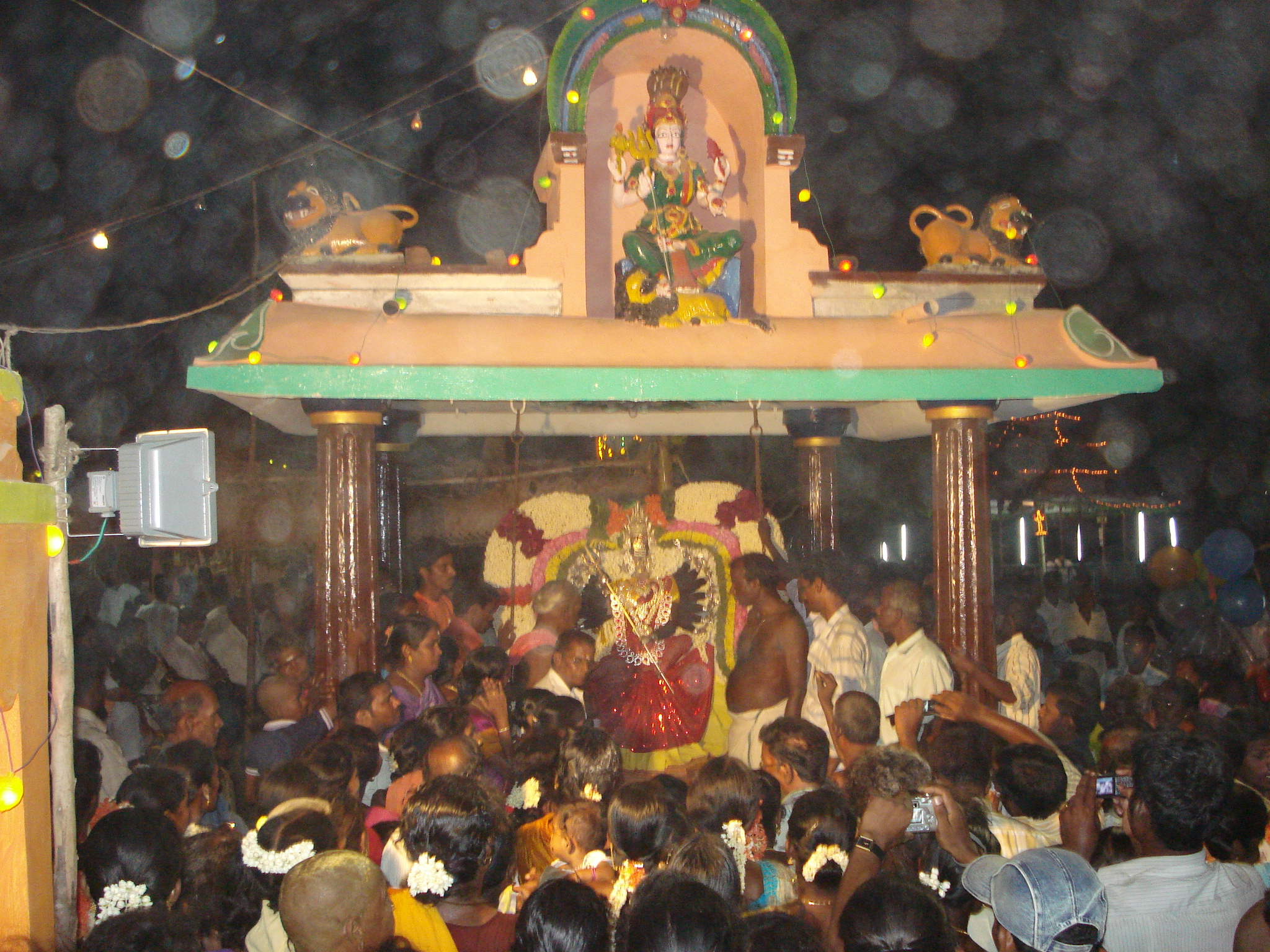
Sri Devi Ellamman swinging in oonjal

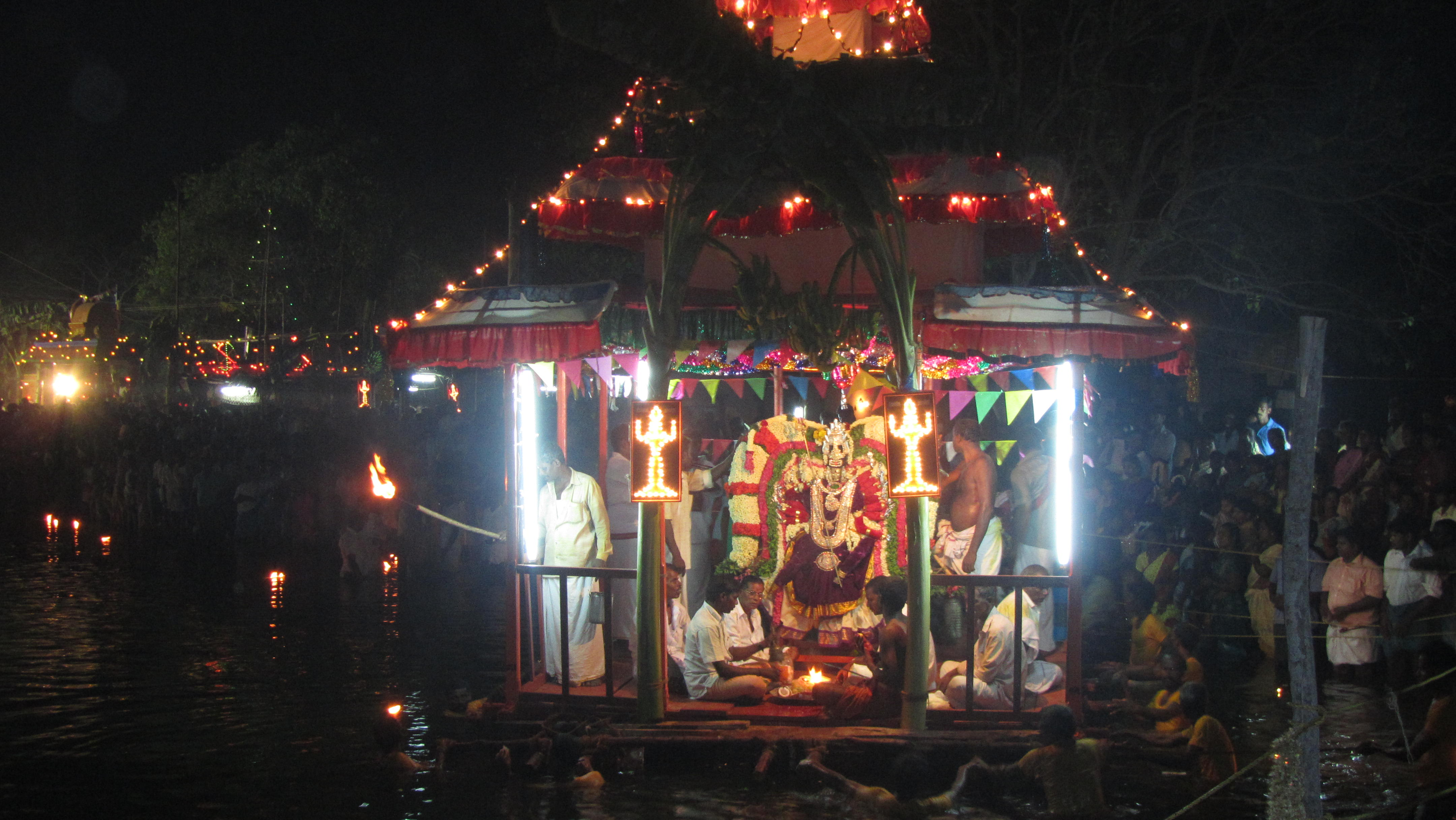
Sri Devi Ellamman in Theppakulam floating boat

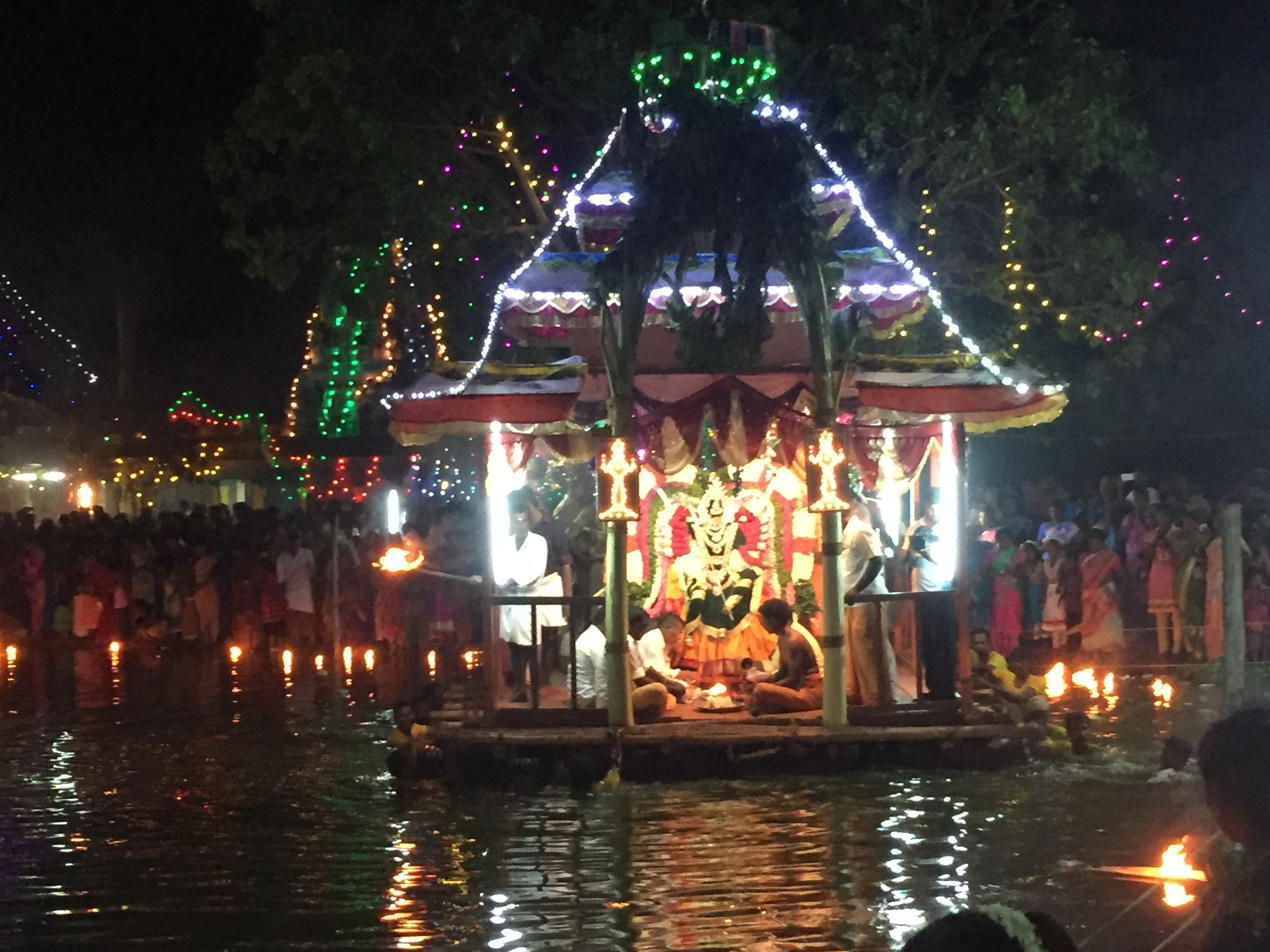
Sri Devi Ellamman in Theppakulam floating boat

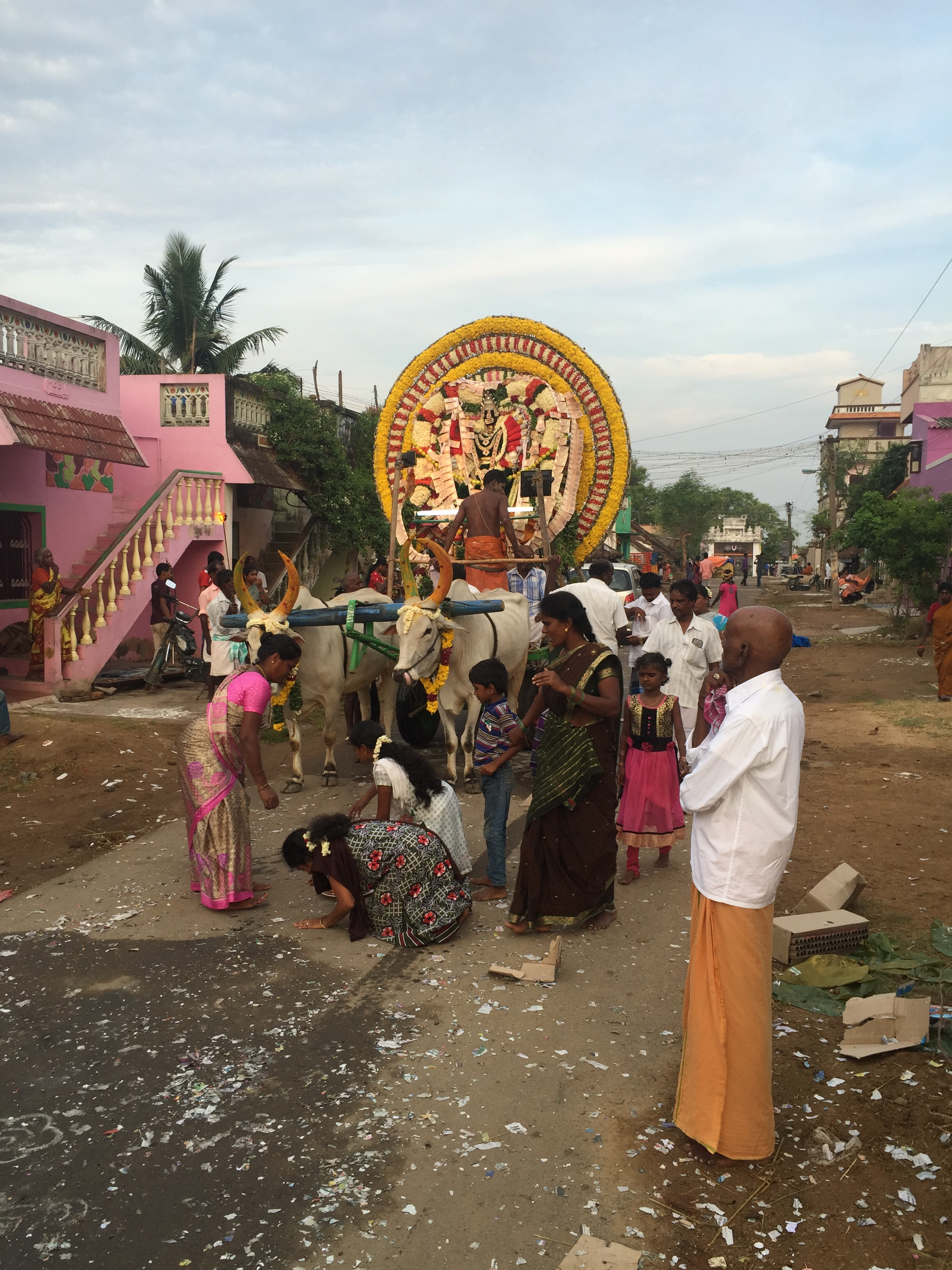
Devi Ellamman Veethi Ula in Simma Vaghana Parvettai

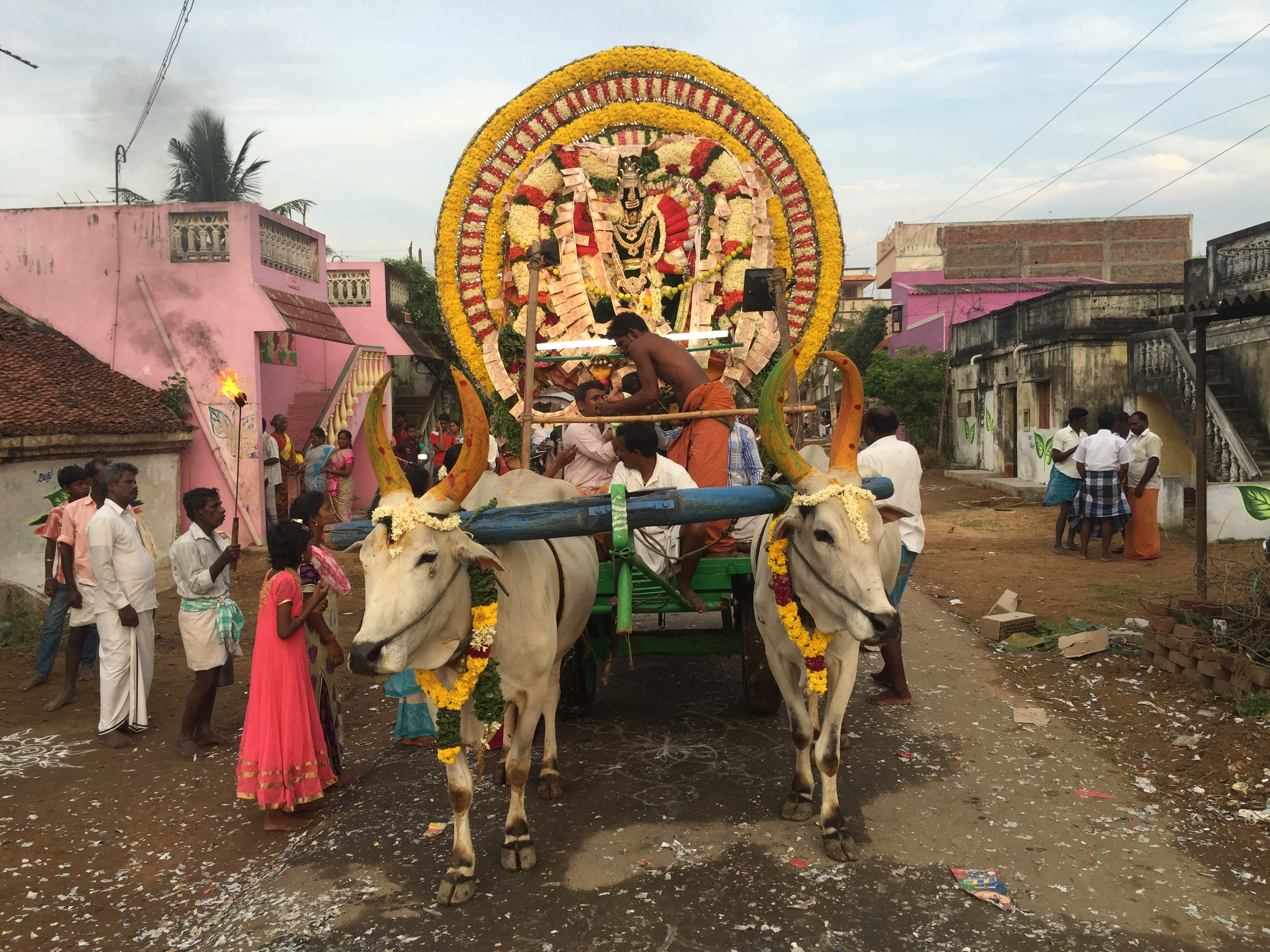
Devi Ellamman Veethi Ula in Simma Vaghana Parvettai

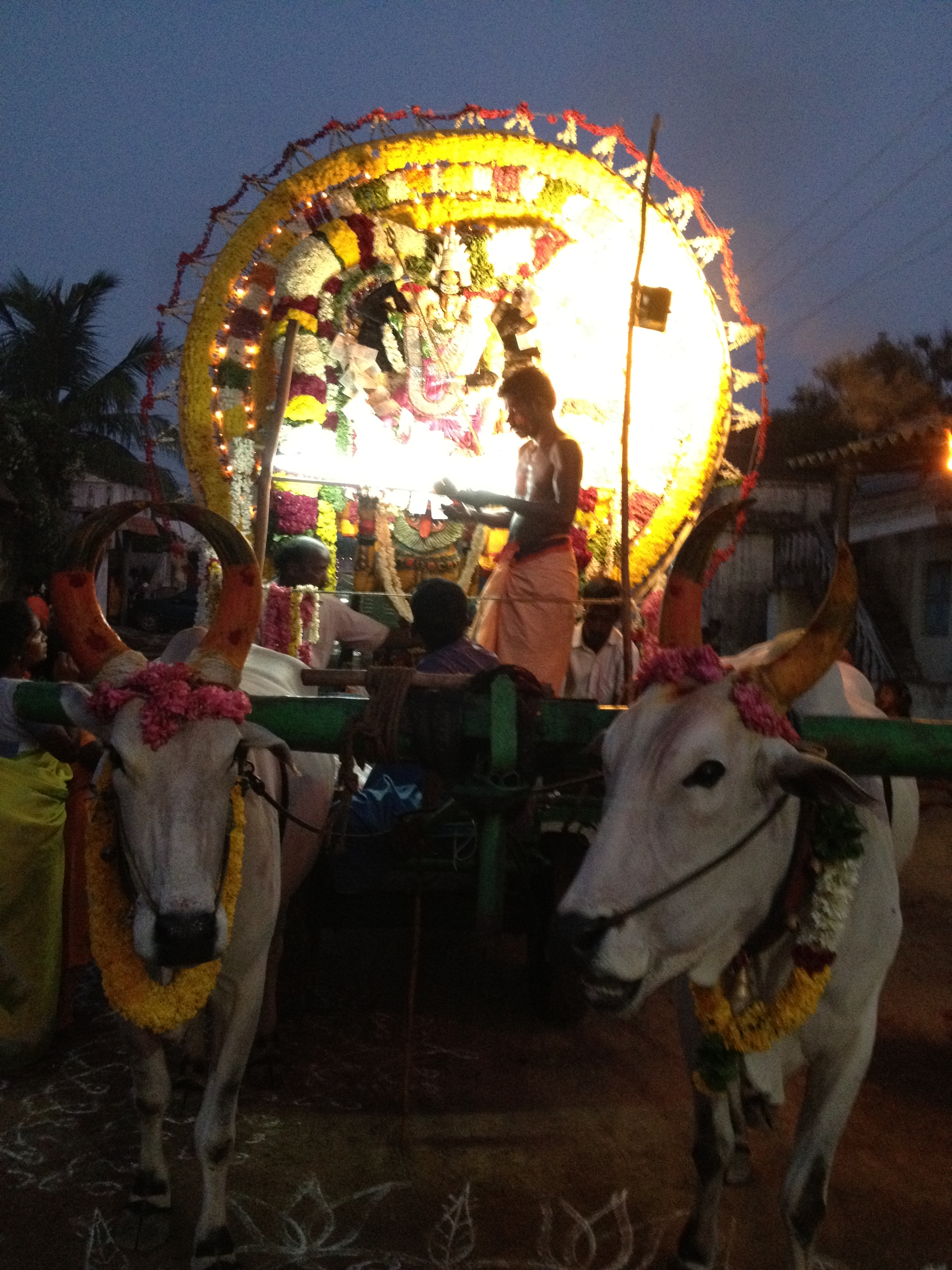
Sri Devi Ellamman in Bullock Cart during Veedhi Ula

=== Bramma Urchavangal (பிரம்ம உற்சவங்கள்) ===
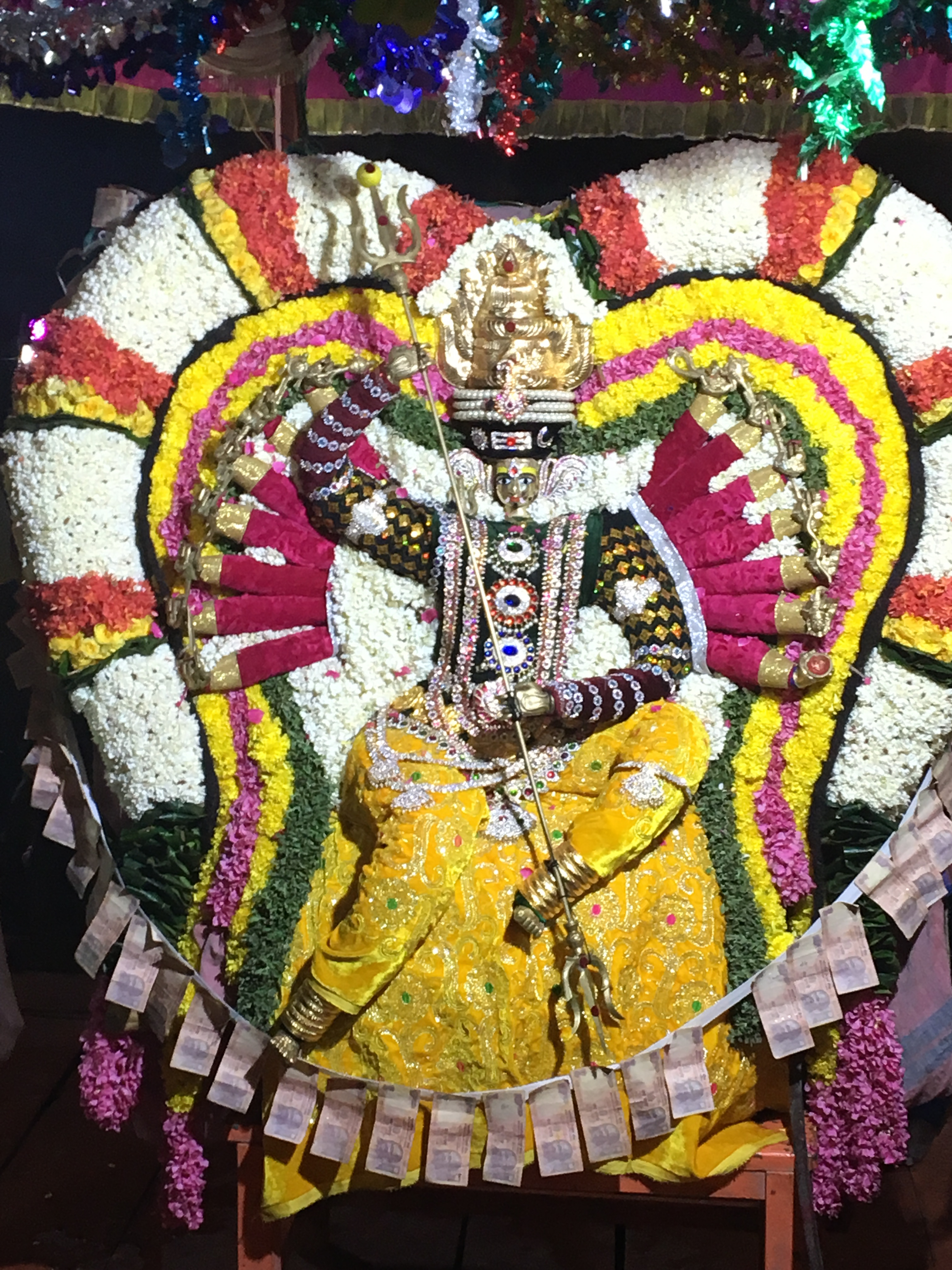
Sri Devi Ellamman Simma Vaghana Parvettai

Day	Avatars (Amman Veethi Ula)
Day 1	Flag day, Sri Parvathiambal, Sri Ellamman graga pushpa alangaram Pambai
Day 2	Sri Durgai Amman
Day 3	Sri Chamundiswari
Day 4	Sri Renuka Parameshwari
Day 5	Sri Meenakshi Amman
Day 6	Sri Andal Amman
Day 7	Sri Rajarajeshwari
Day 8	Sri Kannyamman
Day 9	Sri Kamakshi Amman
Day 10	Sri Devi Ellamman Simma Vagana Parvettai
Day 11	Sandhana Kappu Alangaram

=== Other Festivals ===
Likewise, Tamil Aadi month Koozh (கூழ் - One of the great south Indian food) will be served to their neighborhoods and relatives during Gangaiamman & Bommayi amman temple festival.

And many other festivals for Vinayakar, Perumal and Adanjiamman temples.

Lord Perumal

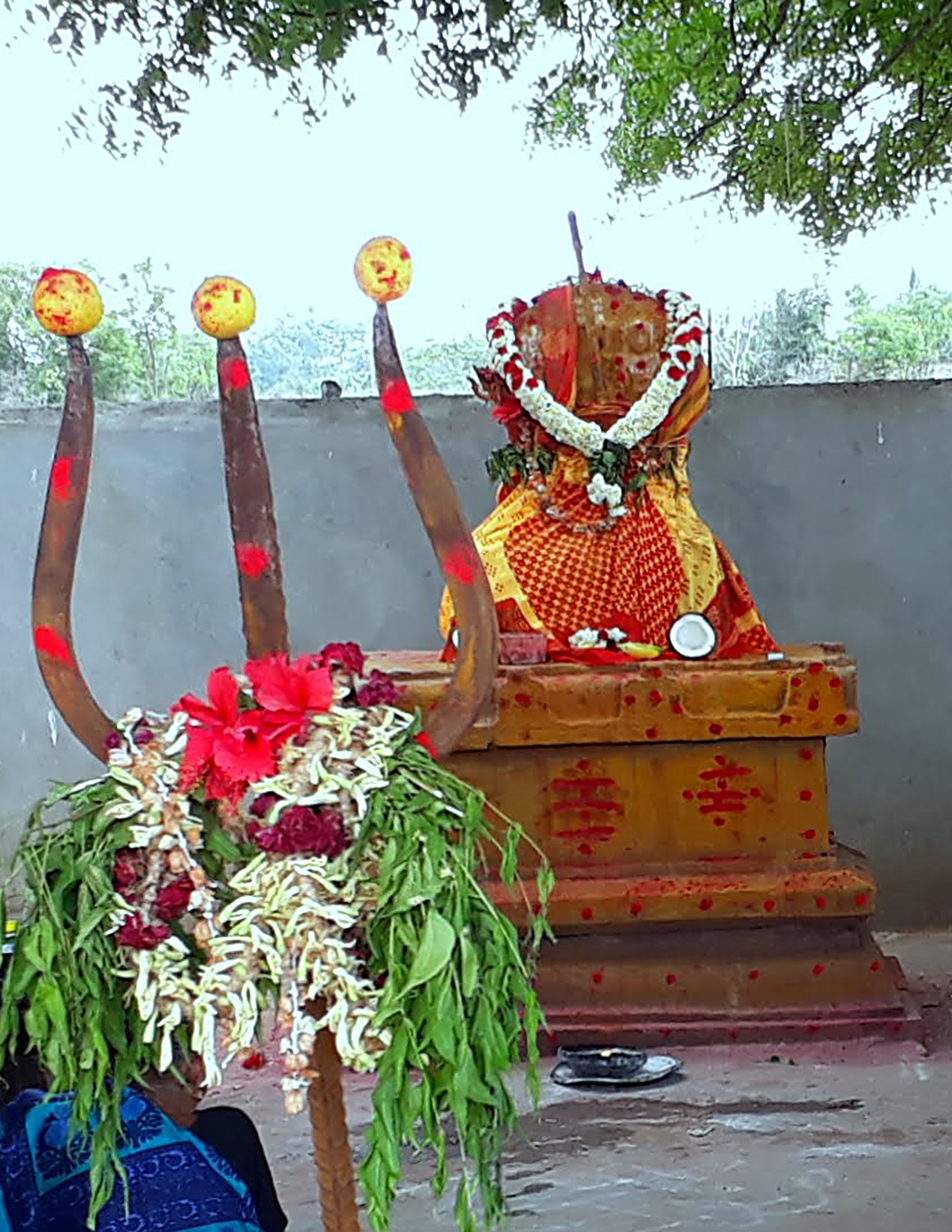
Sri Periyandavar

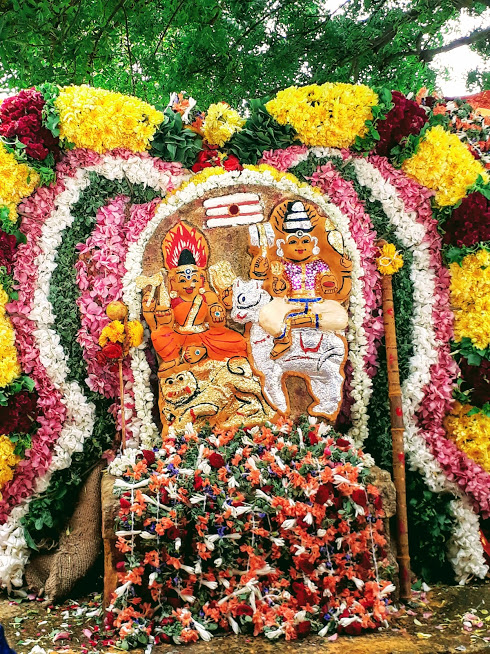
Temple Moolasthanam

== Education ==
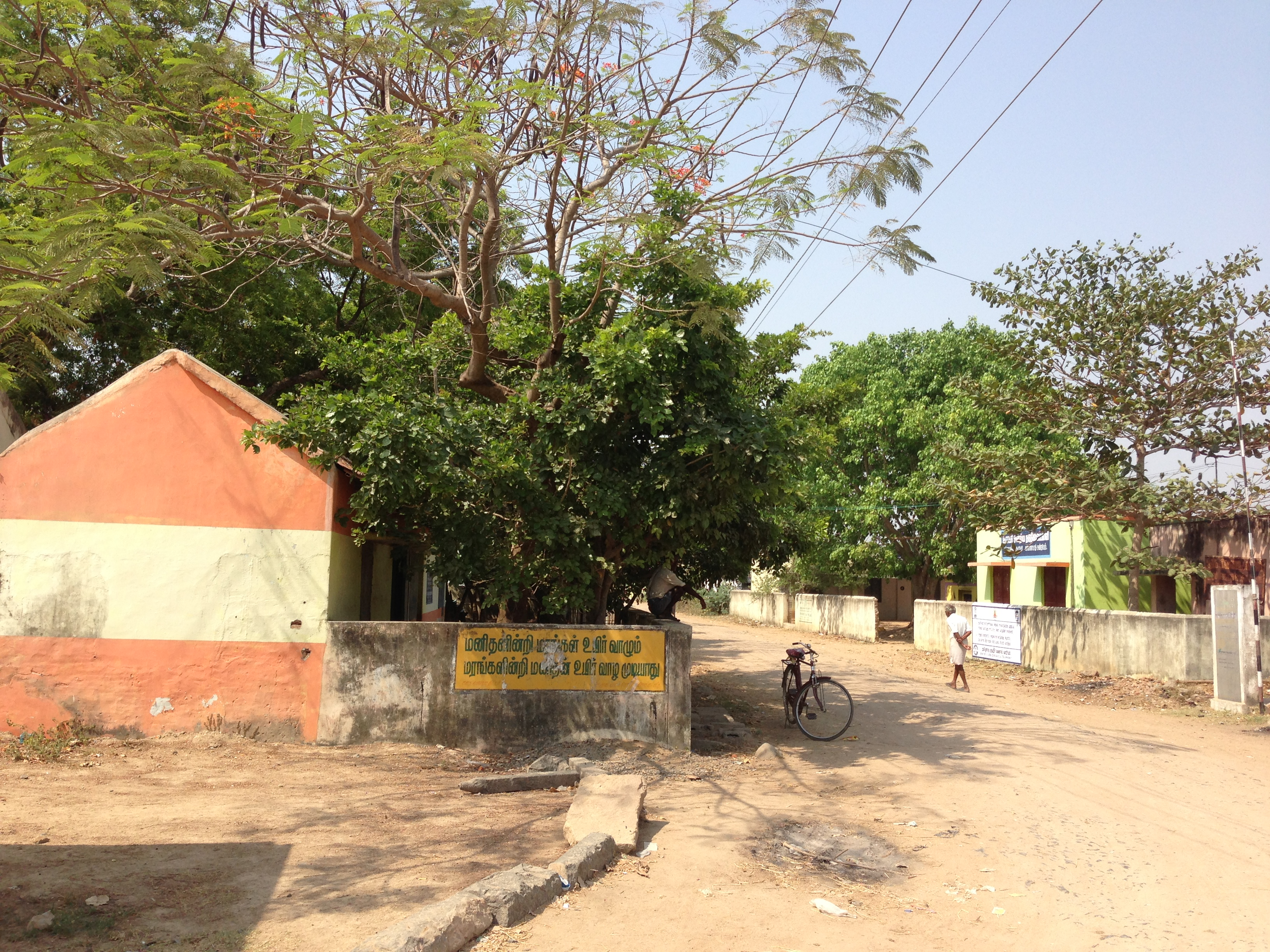
Nathanallur Panchayat Union Middle School

Panchayat Union School is established by 1923s. In 2006 the school got certification and the name is converted into Panchayat Union Middle School.

As of 2011 India census, Nathanallur had a population of 2158. Males constitute 48.5% of the population and females 51.5%. Nathanallur has an average literacy rate of 67.8%, higher than the national average of 59.5%: male literacy is 73.9%, and female literacy is 61.9%. In Nathanallur, 12% of the population is under 6 years of age.

== Transportation ==
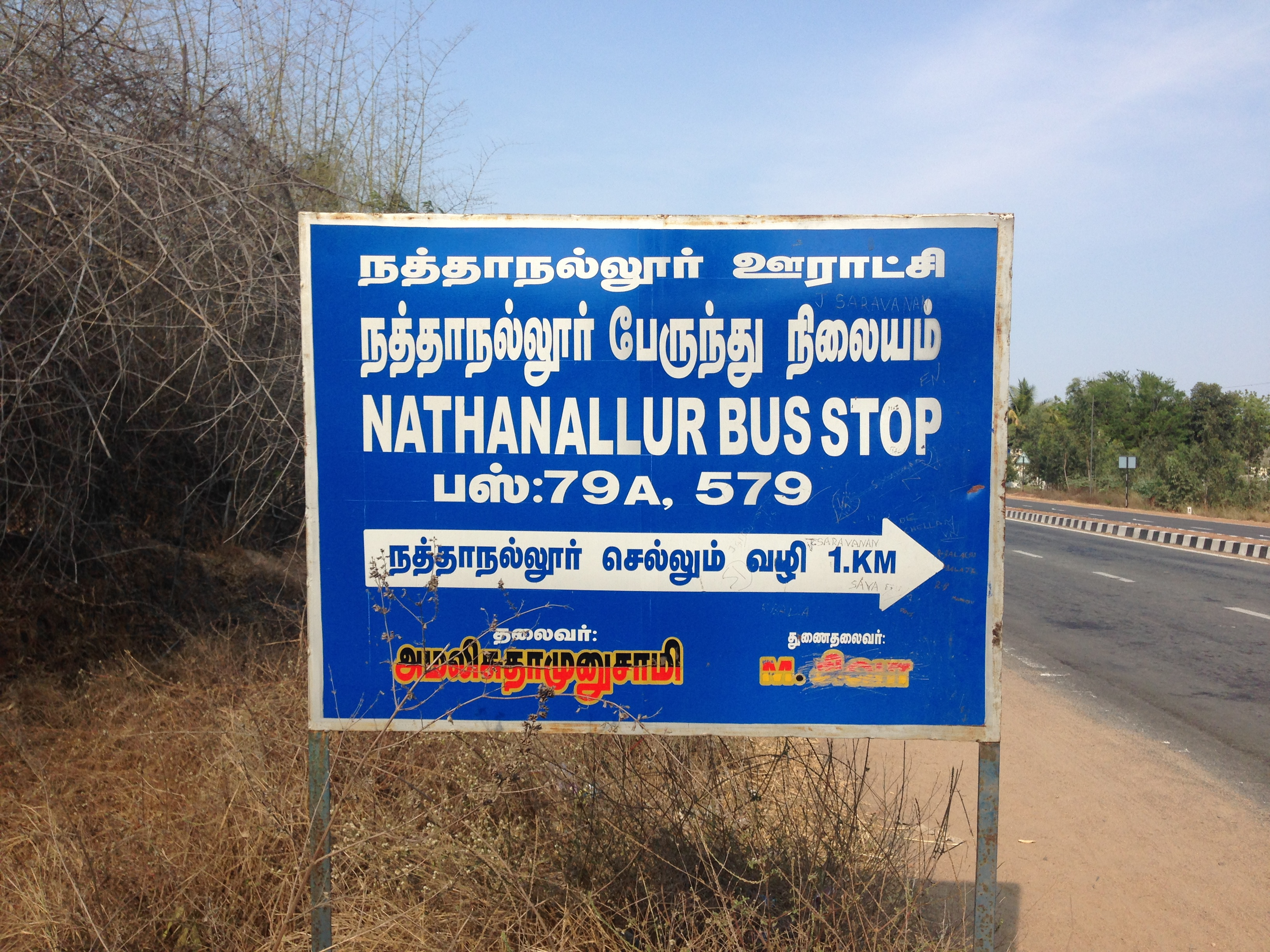
Nathanallur Bus Stop

Village people will get everything from the nearby town Walajabad. Therefore, most of them having two wheeler. However, Few people depending on the public transport. There is no specific public transport for Nathanallur. But people will get the public bus on junction (Nathanallur Koot road) at SH 48 where route 79 and 579A buses are available at every 10 minutes interval. Walajabad is the only near by railway station for local Trains.

=== Route List ===
Ordinary services	Express services	Delux services	Volvo A/C

Legend: HF- High Frequency Route, NS – Night Service Route, LF – Low Frequency Route

Route No	Origin	Destination	Stage Names	HF	LF
579A	Tambaram	Walajabad	Mudichur, Padappai, Oragadam, Varanavasi, Nathanallur	x	
79	Kanchipuram	Tambaram	Ayyampet, Walajabad, Nathanallur, Varanavasi, Oragadam, Padappai, Mudichur		x
79EXP	Kanchipuram	Tambaram	Ayyampet, Walajabad, Varanavasi, Oragadam, Padappai, Mudichur		x

== Profession ==
Most of the village people are land lards and Koolis. Agriculture is the main day-to-day work for the village people. But nowadays the agriculture is drastically coming down and real estate business is dominating in the people mind.

== Religions ==
90% of the village peoples are Hindu and remaining peoples are recently being converted to Christians.

== Place of Worship ==
- Dhuraimurugar Siva Marabu Sithaandha Dhiyana Sabai, http://www.templedivinesuccess.com

== Villages & Towns Near By Nathanallur ==
Name	Distance
Puliambakkam	2.0 km
Kattavakkam	3.9 km
Sankarapuram	5.0 km
Uthukadu	5.7 km
Thenneri	10.5 km
Walajabad	5.5 km
Kanchipuram	20.9 km
Tambaram	36.4 km

== Colleges near by Nathanallur ==
1. Lord Venkateswaraa Engineering College, Puliambakkam
2. Adhi College of Engineering and Technology, Sankarapuram
3. Esenes Institute of Teacher Education, Walajabad
4. Cholan Teacher Training Institute, Sambarambakkam
5. Amirtham Institute of Management Studies, Walajabad

== Residential Projects ==
1. Inno GeoCity, Thenneri
2. ADHAM properties in MADURANALLUR : //www.adhamproperties.com
