= Thammanur =

- village
- Location in Tamil Nadu, India Thammanur (India)
- Coordinates: 12°45′46″N 79°48′47″E
- Country: India
- State: Tamil Nadu
- District: Kanchipuram district
- Taluk: Walajabad taluk

Languages
  - Official: Tamil
- Time zone: UTC+5:30 (IST)

Thammanur (Village ID 629725) is a village in Walajabad taluk, in the Kanchipuram district of India. It is located about 4 kilometres (2.5 mi) from the town of Walajabad near Kanchipuram. It has a population of about 2500. It is situated on the route to Ilayanarvelur (known for Murugan temple) from Walajabad. There is a Panchayat Union Middle School. The village has an ancient Shiva temple (Ekambareswarar) which was built during 12th to 13th century latter Chozha period. It is surrounded by lush green paddy and sugarcane fields. According to the 2011 census it has a population of 2116 living in 526 households.
