= Kavanthandalam =

Village in Kanchipuram district

- village
- Country: India
- State: Tamil Nadu
- District: Kanchipuram district
- Taluk: Walajabad taluk

Languages
  - Official: Tamil
- Time zone: UTC+5:30 (IST)

Kavanthandalam is a small village located about 20 km from Kanchipuram by road in Tamil Nadu, India. The location of Kavanthandalam in the proximity of Kanchipuram, known as temple city adds to the richness of the cultural heritage of this village.

== History ==
The name of the village hails from the word Kasiyappar Thandalam which over the course of time has changed to Kavanthandalam. The name was a result of a saint, Kasiyappa Munivar, who had lived and meditated at this village.

== Geography ==
The village is rich in resources for cultivation. The Cheyyar River flows alongside the village bringing in water needed for cultivation. The village is well connected by road to Kanchipuram and Walajabad which are 20 and 8 km respectively by road and kanchipuram, utthiramerur road connected to kavanthandalam. This side also 20 km from kanchipuram.

== Precinct ==
The village is divided into two major portions, Vadapadhi and Thenpadhi, meaning northern half and southern half.

== Temples ==
The prominent temples in the village include Choleeswaraswamy Temple, Perumal Temple, Ganesh Temple, Mariamman temple and Moolathu Muthu Mari Amman Temple.

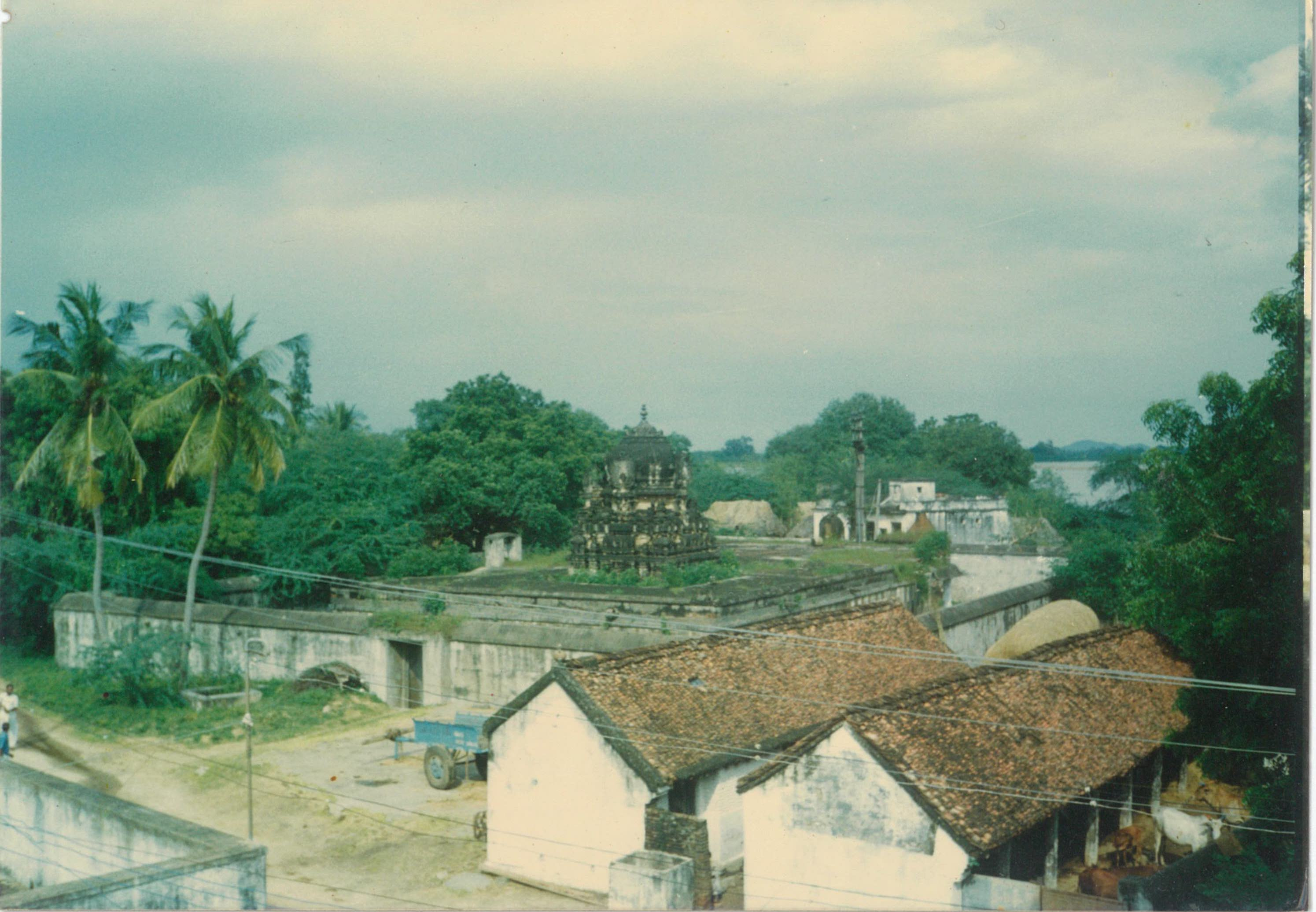

Apart from these temples there is a village deity named Kosapattaman.

After 15 years Maha Brahamotsava vizha has been conducted for this temple from 18 to 26 August 2015.

== Life and occupation ==
The principal activity of the villagers is agriculture. Some are also involved in other activities like grazing and hand-weaving. The village also houses a small modern rice mill creating direct and indirect employment to a few villagers apart from agriculture. The primary crops raised by the villagers are rice and sugarcane. Groundnuts and other cereals are also cultivated as lean crops by the villagers.
