= Uthukadu =

Uthukadu periyandavar
- Village
- Location in Tamil Nadu, India
- Coordinates: 12°47′27.1″N 79°49′16.8″E
- Country: India
- State: Tamil Nadu
- District: Kanchipuram

Government
  - Village Panchayat President: .T

Area
  - Total: 8.73 km^{2} (3.37 sq mi)
- Elevation: 74.4 m (244 ft)

Population (2011)
  - Total: 4,528
  - Density: 519/km^{2} (1,340/sq mi)
- Time zone: UTC+5:30 (IST)
- Pincode: 631605
- Area code: +91-44
- Vehicle registration: TN 21
- Official language: Tamil
- Spoken languages: Tamil, English

Uthukadu is a small village in Walajabad panchayat union, Kanchipuram district, Tamil Nadu, India. Tamil Nadu state highway 48 is passing through Uthukadu village. Uthukadu is 4.5 kilometres (2.8 mi) distance from its Walajabad town, 19.7 kilometres (12.2 mi) distance from its district main city Kanchipuram and 67.7 kilometres (42.1 mi) distance from its state main city Chennai.

== Festivals in Uthukadu ==
There are many temples in Uthukadu. Carnivals are celebrated for each temple in different periods.

List of popularly known temple are below.

- Ellamman Temple (எல்லம்மன் ஆலயம்)
- Perumal Temple (பெருமாள் ஆலயம்)
- Veera Anjanayar Temple
- Many Vinayakar Temple (விநாயகர் ஆலயம்)
- Mahalingeswarar Temple (மகாலிங்கேஸ்வரர் ஆலயம்)
- Periyandavar Temple
- Ponniyamman Temple
- Arumugam (Murugan Temple)
- Porpandi Isvaran and many more.
- Poth Raja Temple
- Jestha Devi

== Arulmigu Sri Periyandavar Temple Pictures ==
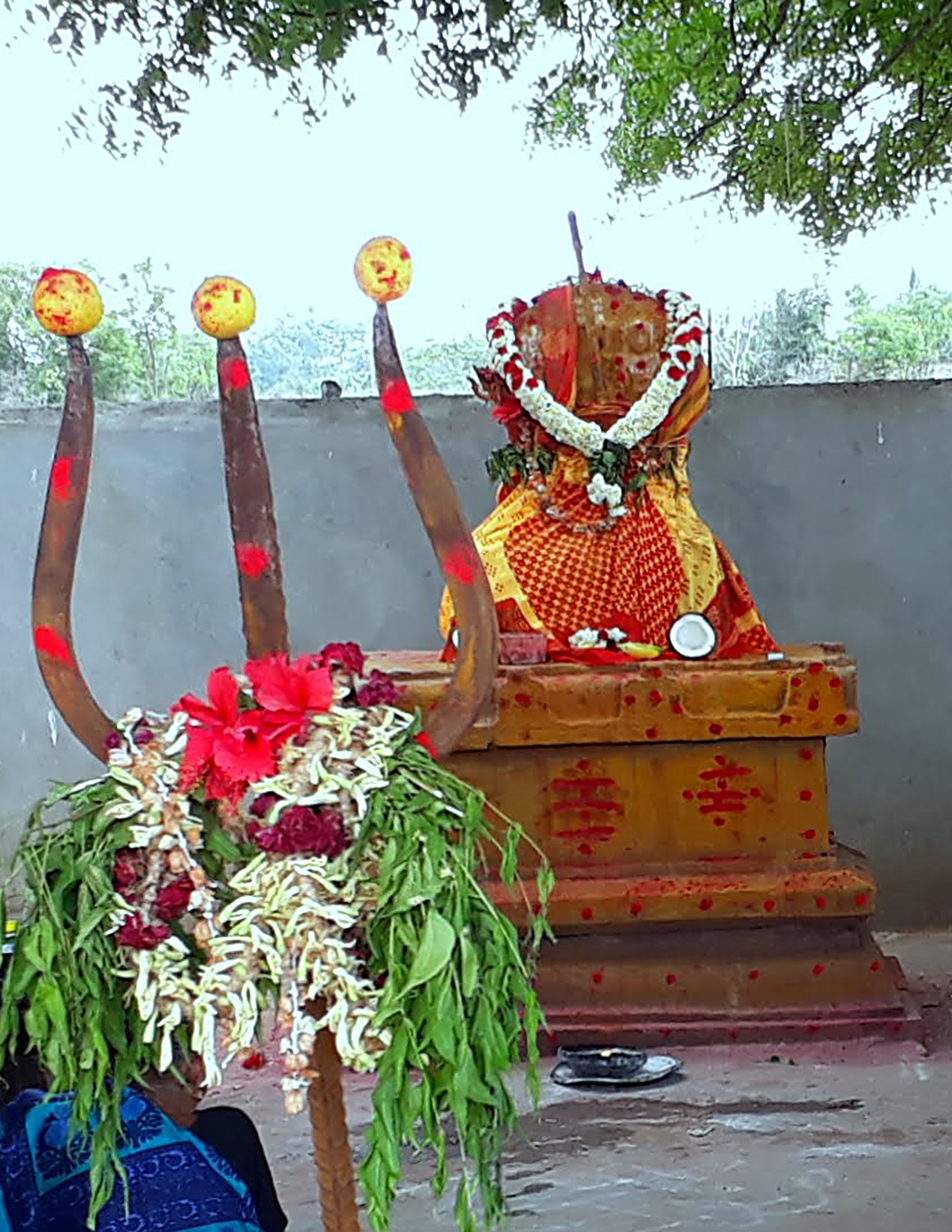
Arulmigu Sri Periyandavar

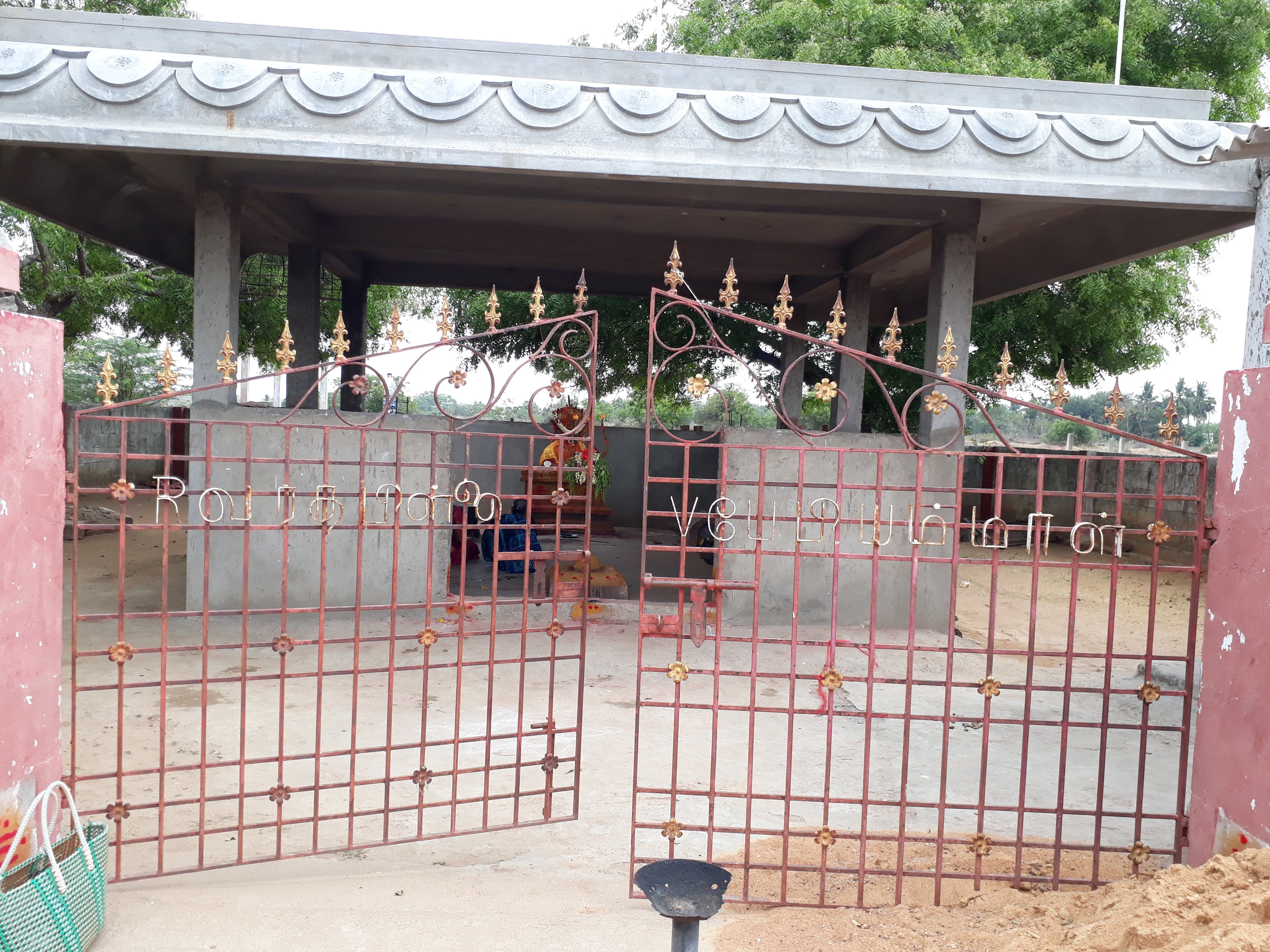

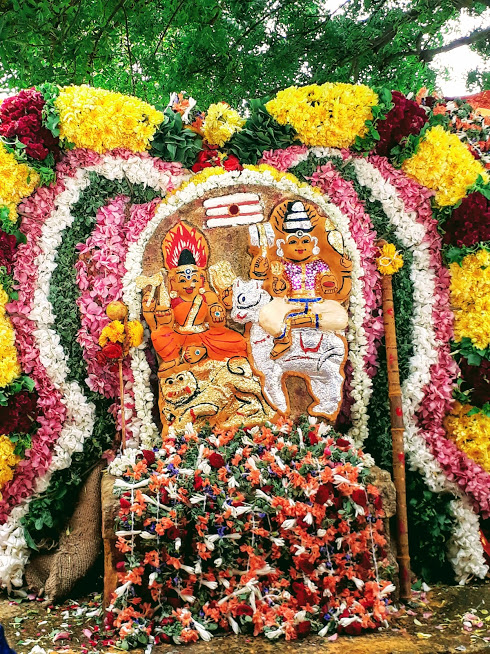
Temple moolasthanam

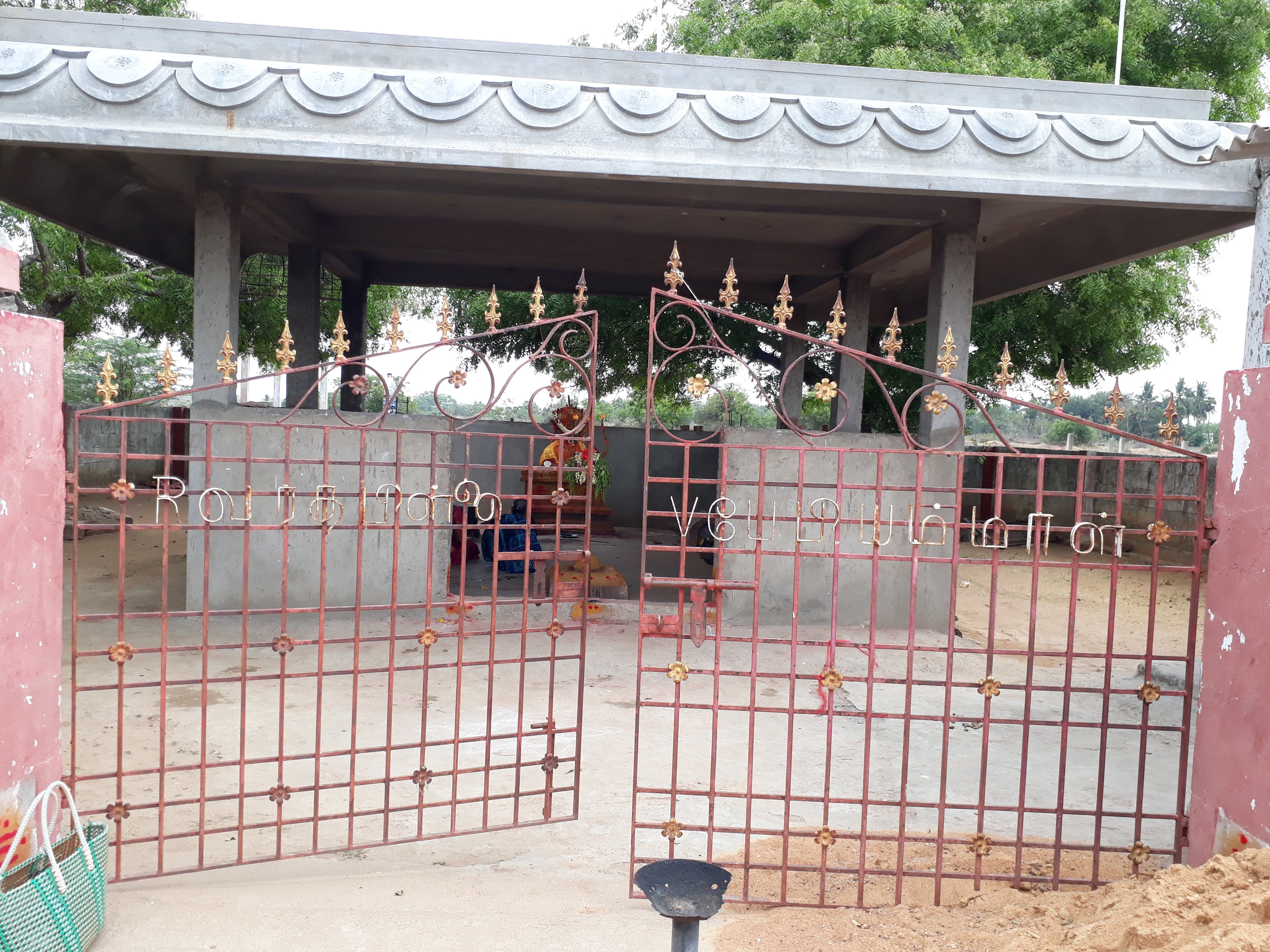
Arulmigu Sri Periyandavar Front View

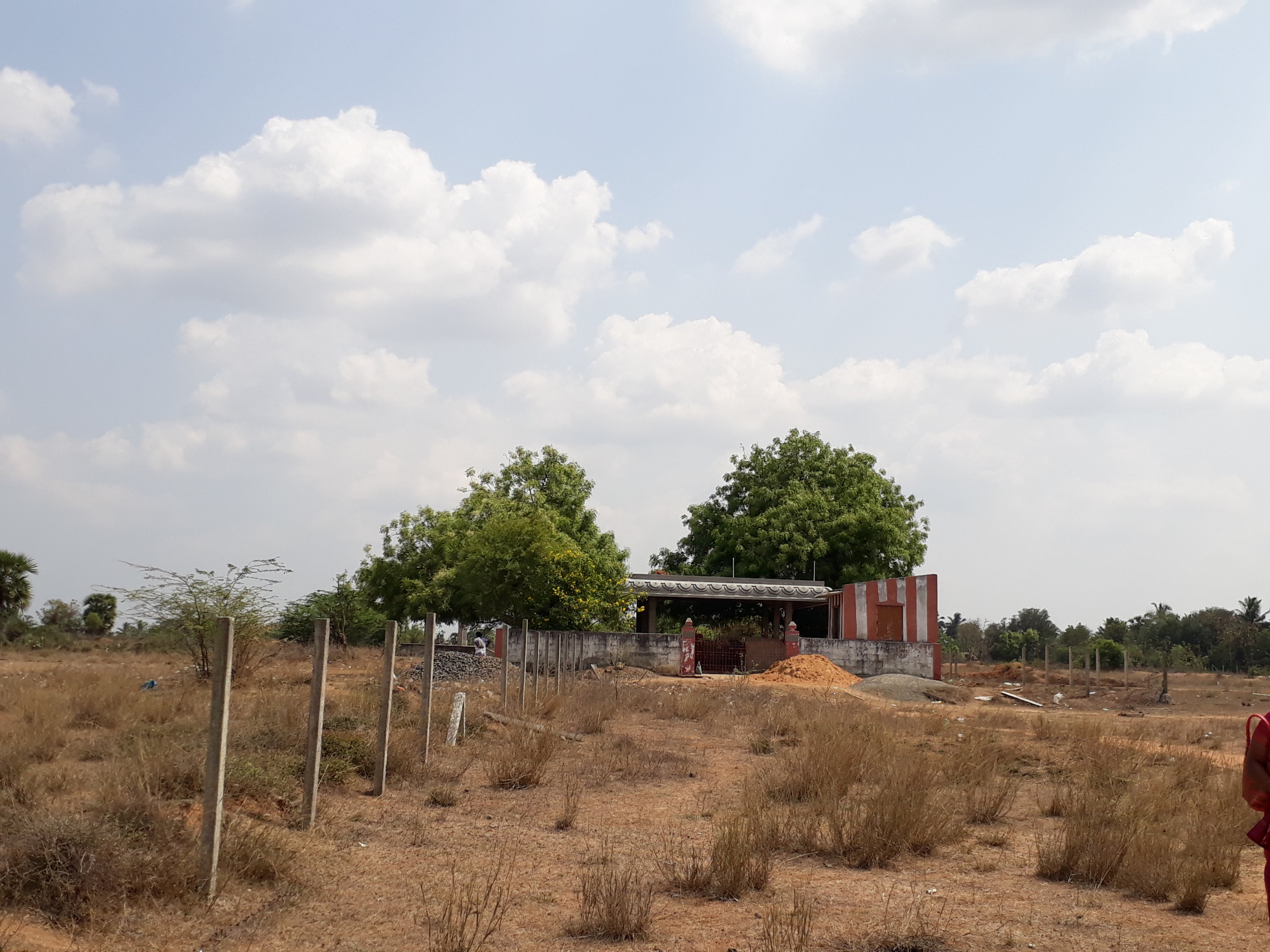
Arulmigu Sri Periyandavar Long View

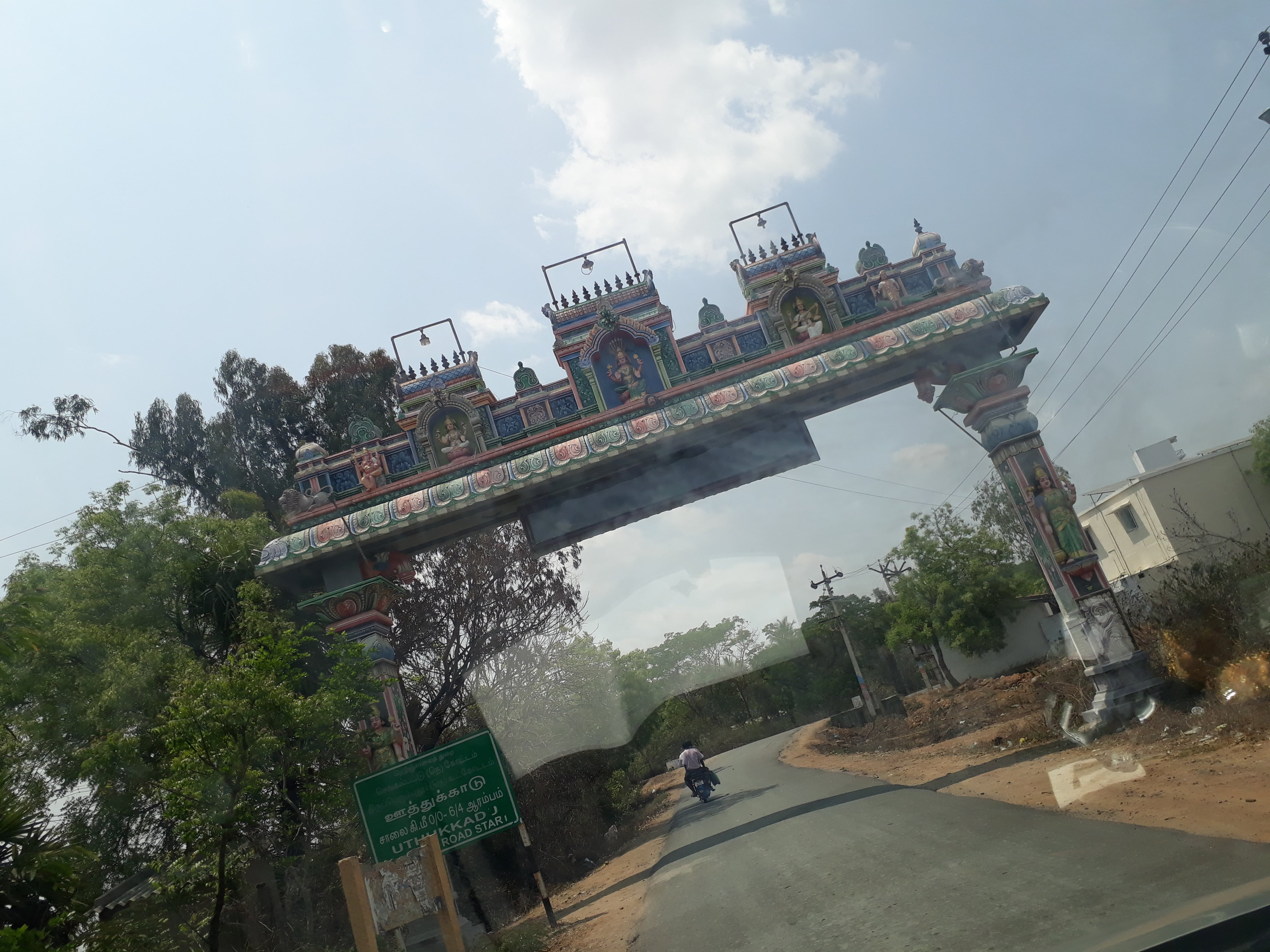
அருள்மிகு ஸ்ரீ பெரியாண்டவர் ஆலயம் நுழைவு வாயில்

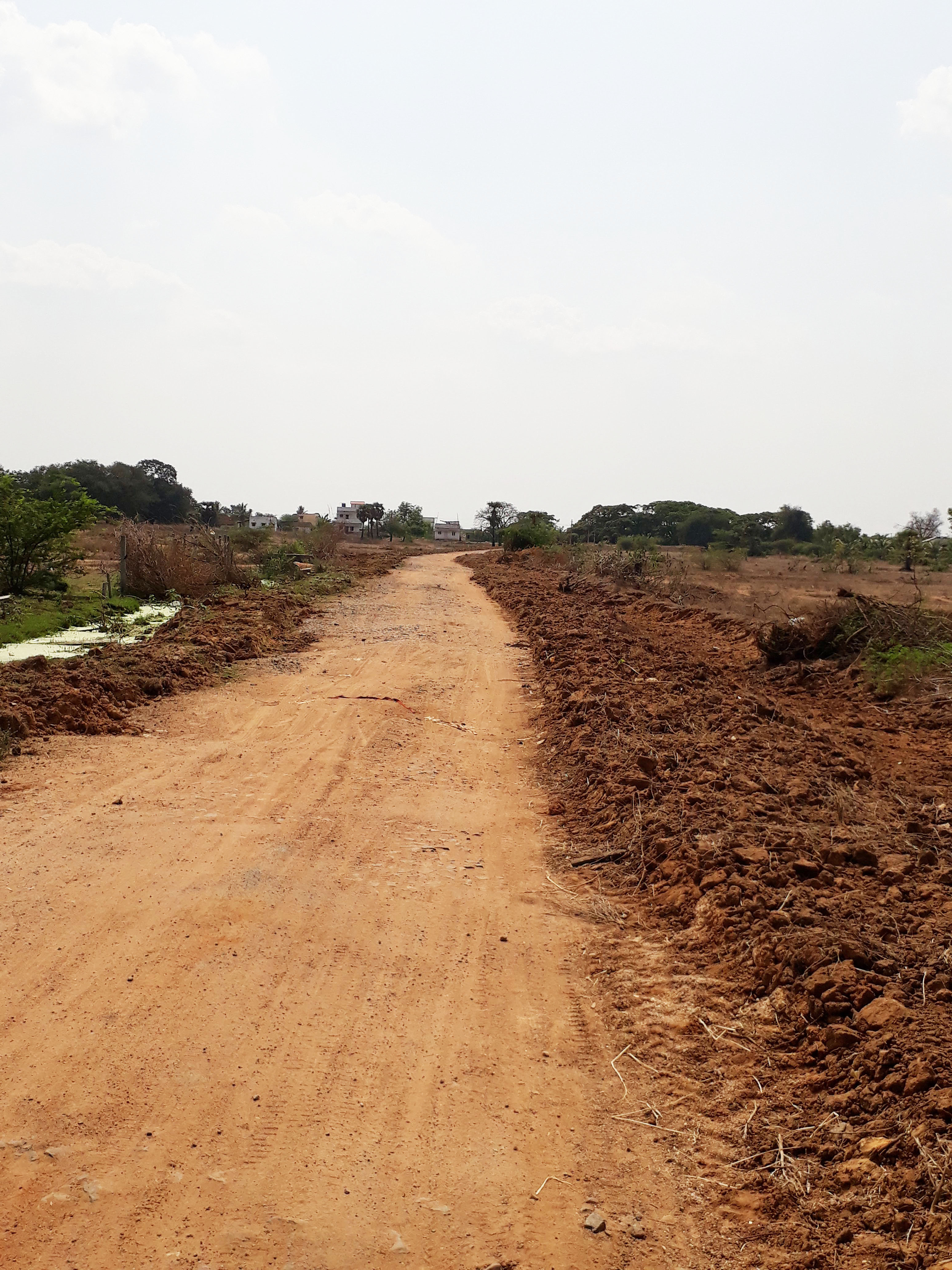
Arulmigu Sri Periyandavar temple sellum Oru Vazhi Paathai

== Arulmigu Sri Ellamman Temple Pictures ==
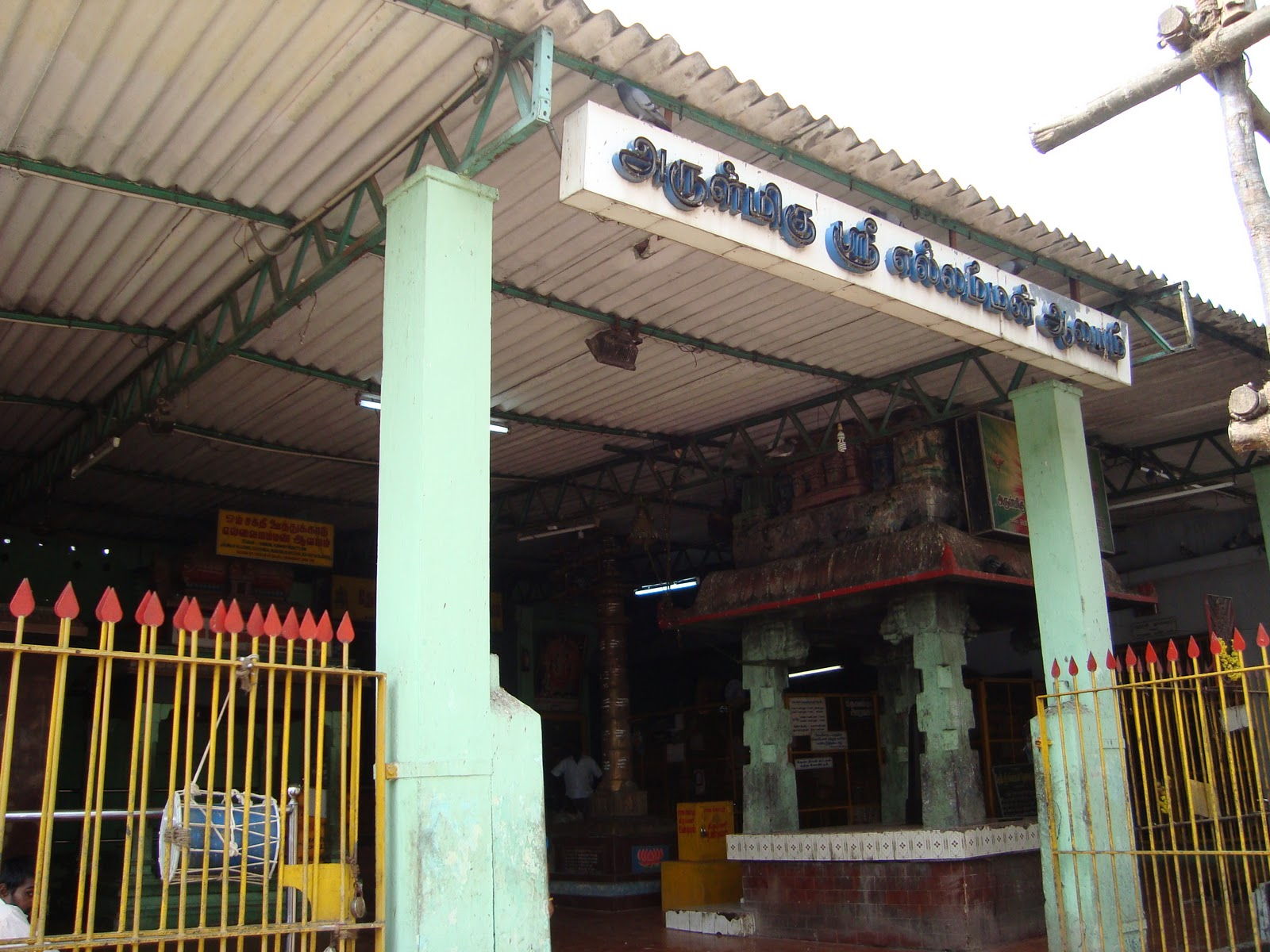
Arulmigu Sri Ellamman Front View

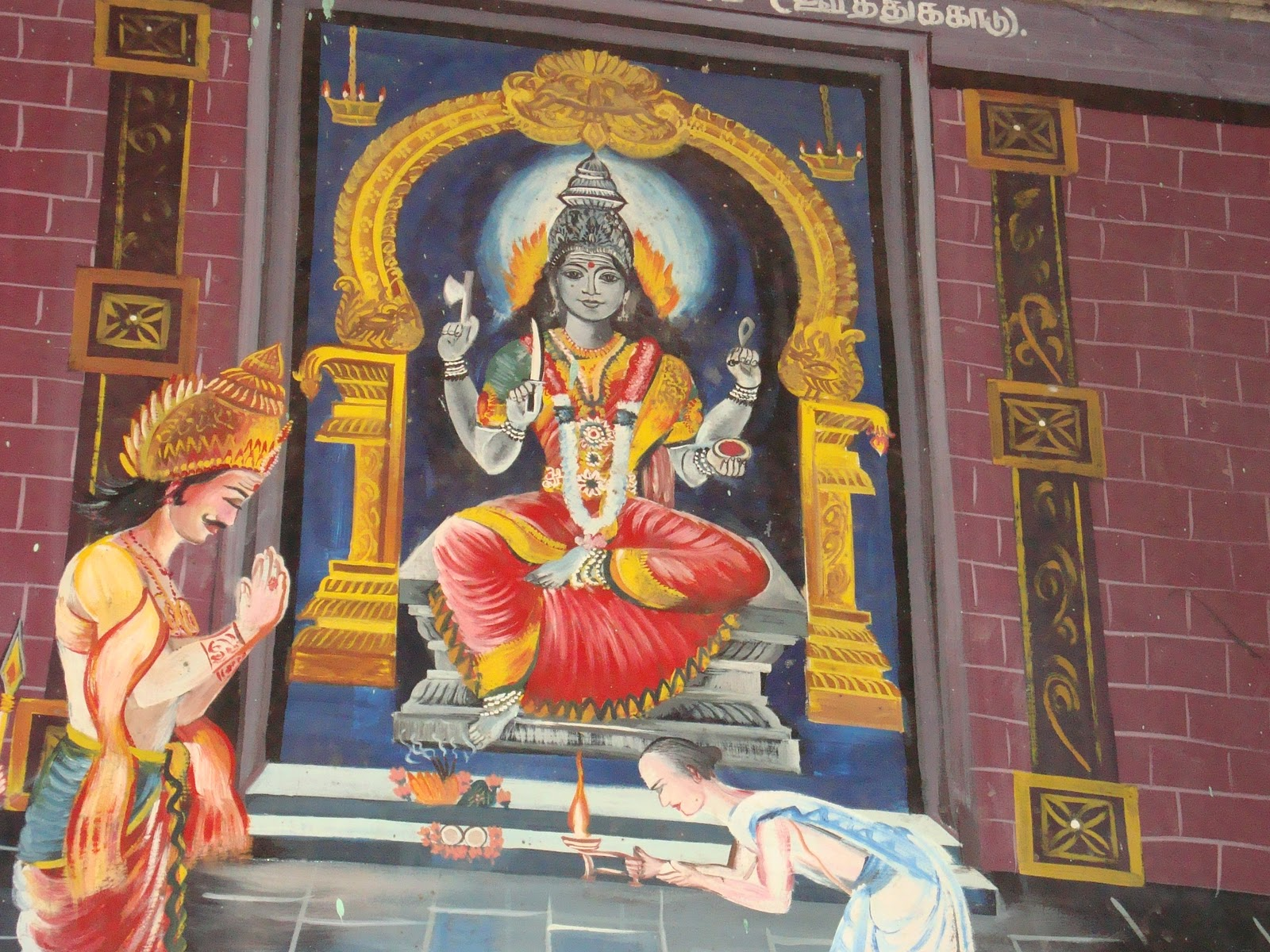
Ellamman with King- Art

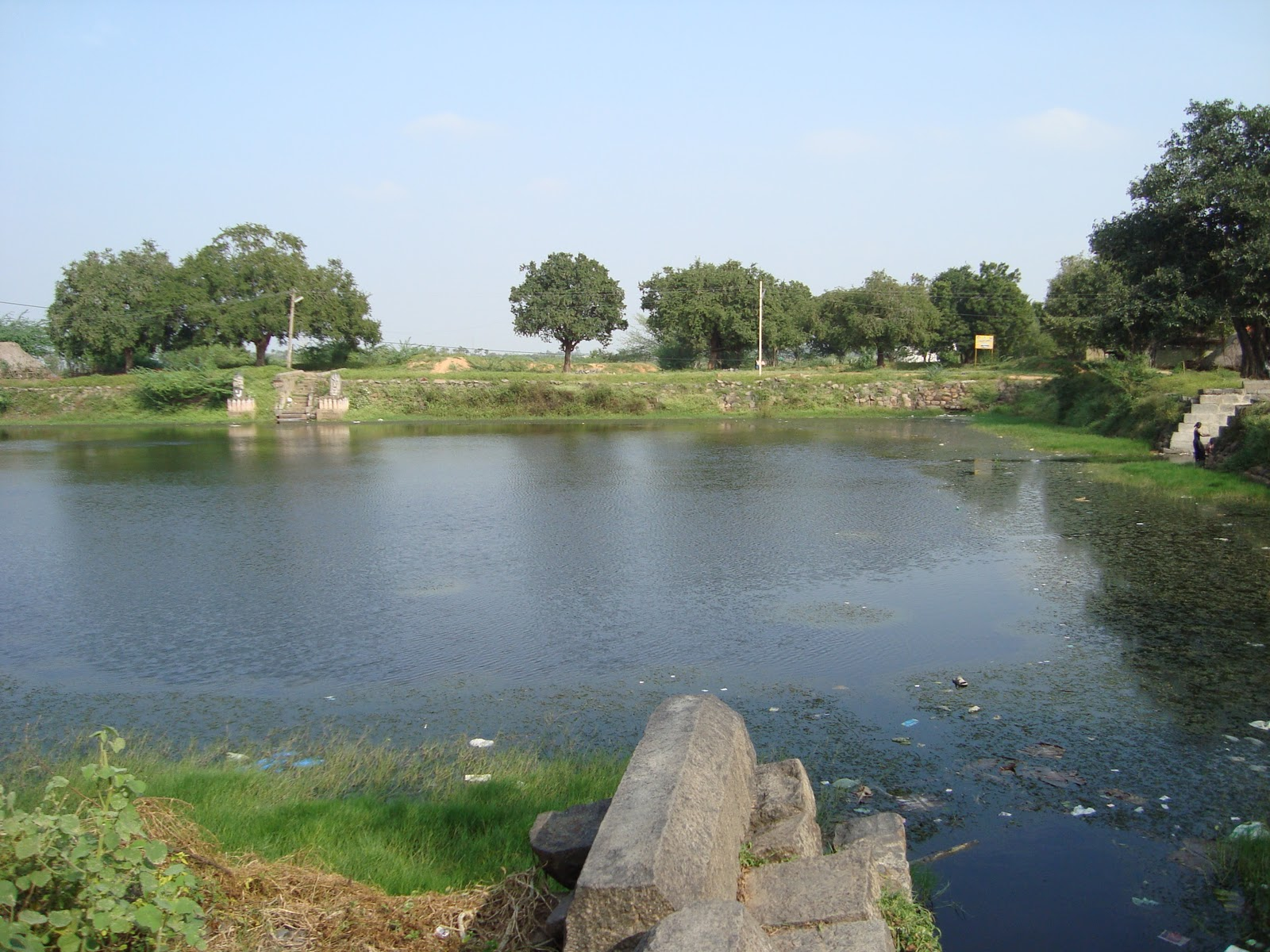
Ellamman Temple Pond

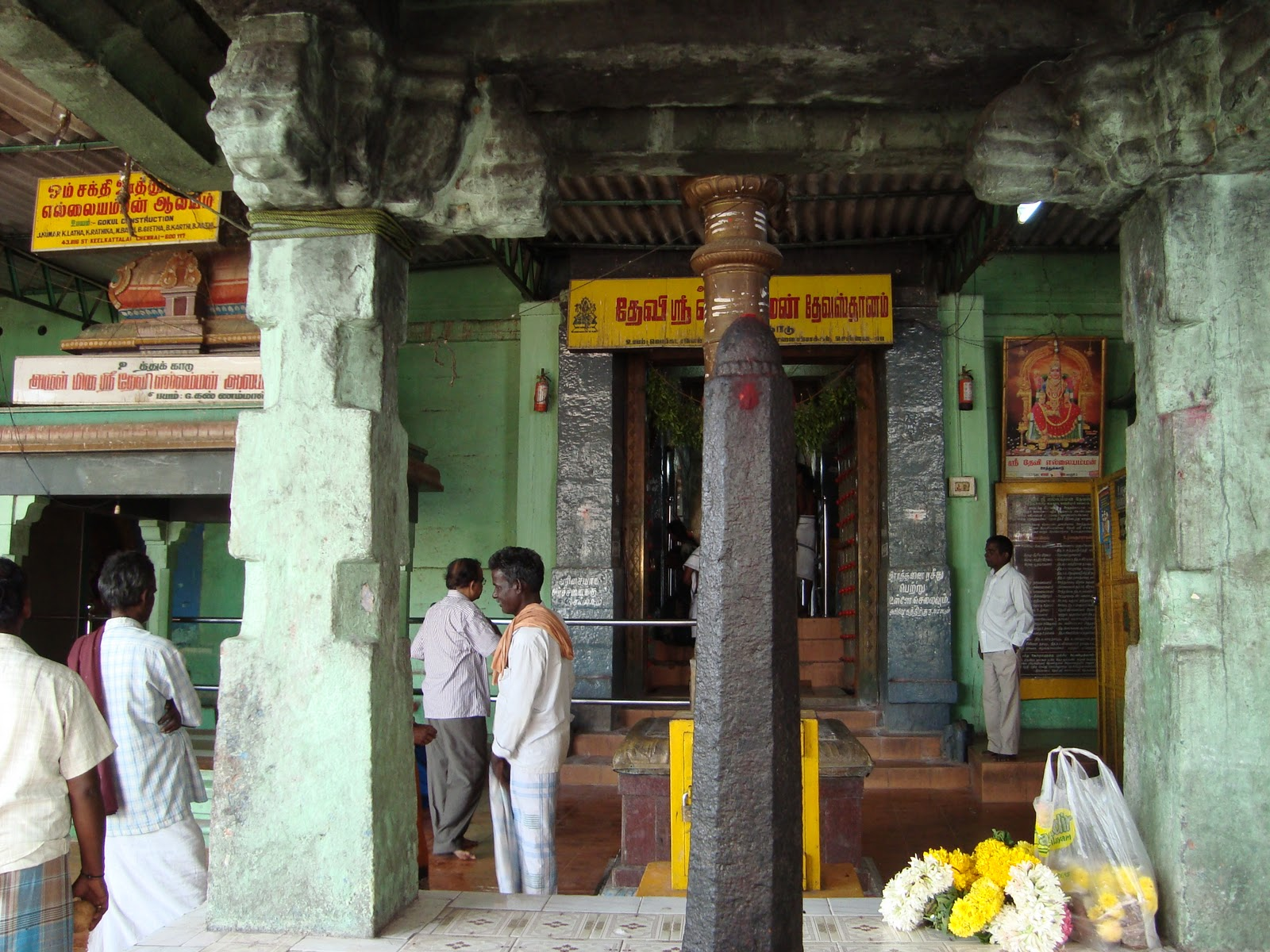
Ellamman Temple - Balipeedam

Streets:

[Ellai Amman Temple] Chetty street, Bhramanar street, Nadu Street, Pillayar street, Palla street, Kuyavar Street.

== School ==
Panchayat Union School is established by 1968s. Then the school got certification and the name is converted into High School.

== Profession ==
Most of the village people are land lards and Milk Business. Agriculture is the main day to day work for the village people. But nowadays the agriculture is drastically coming down and real estate business is dominating in the people mind.

== Religions ==
95% of the village peoples are Hindu.

== Villages & Towns Near By Uthukadu Ellamman ==
Name	Distance
Walajabad	5 km
Puthagaram	6 km
Kattavakkam	4.2 km
Naicken Kuppam	1.5 km
Nathanallur	5.6 km
Neikuppam	5.0 km
Thenneri	5.0 km
Walajabad	4.5 km
Kanchipuram	19.7 km
Tambaram	39.4 km

== Colleges near by Nathanallur ==
1. Lord Venkateswaraa Engineering College, Puliambakkam
2. Adhi College of Engineering and Technology, Sankarapuram
3. Esenes Institute of Teacher Education, Walajabad
4. Cholan Teacher Training Institute, Sambarambakkam
5. Amirtham Institute of Management Studies, Walajabad

== Residential Projects ==
1. Inno GeoCity, Thenneri
