= Walajabad taluk =

Taluk in the Kanchipuram district of Tamil Nadu, India

Coordinates: 12.7969°N 79.8176°E

Walajabad
- Taluk
- Walajabad
- Interactive map of Walajabad

Area
  - Total: 238.82 km^{2} (92.21 sq mi)

Population (2011)
  - Total: 135,243
  - Density: 566.30/km^{2} (1,466.7/sq mi)

Walajabad taluk is a taluk in the Kanchipuram district of Tamil Nadu, India. The headquarters of the taluk is the town of Walajabad.

== Villages in Walajabad taluk ==
Walajabad taluk contains 80 villages, including:

- Kavanthandalam – a small village located about 20 km from Kanchipuram by road in Tamil Nadu
- Thammanur – a village with about 2,500 residents
- Nathanallur – a small village with about 2,150 residents
- Walajabad – a panchayat town in Kancheepuram district in Tamil Nadu, It is the main town in Walajabad taluk.

== See also ==
- Tehsils of India
