= Walajabad =

- panchayat town
- Location in Tamil Nadu, India
- Coordinates: 12.7969°N 79.8176°E
- Country: India
- State: Tamil Nadu
- District: Kanchipuram district
- Taluk: Walajabad taluk

Area
  - Total: 8.97 km^{2} (3.46 sq mi)
- Elevation: 65 m (213 ft)

Population (2011)
  - Total: 14,678
  - Density: 1,640/km^{2} (4,240/sq mi)

Languages
  - Official: Tamil
- Time zone: UTC+5:30 (IST)
- Postal code: 631605

Walajabad is a panchayat town in Kancheepuram district in the Indian state of Tamil Nadu. It is the main town in Walajabad taluk.

== Demographics ==
As of 2001 India census, Walajabad had a population of 10,859. Males constitute 50% of the population and females 50%. Walajabad has an average literacy rate of 75%, higher than the national average of 59.5%: male literacy is 82%, and female literacy is 68%. In Walajabad, 12% of the population is under 6 years of age.

Before the invasion of Arcot Nawab this place was called as Sivapuram. Some people opine that the name was Seevaram. A British Regiment had a camp here for long. Marathi tailors lived here. There is a street named Kasaaikkara street can still be found. Water suppliers to the army were hired and a street named Kavadikkaran street still exists. Round Bungalow where the chief of the Regiment lived with his lover till her last days, is still in a fine condition. Later it was renamed to Walajabad. Here Vishnu and Sivan temples are there which are the oldest and belong to Pallava dynasty. This is a central hub which connects Chennai, Kancheepuram, Chengalpet and Illaiyanaavellur. Near to Walajabad (about 17 km) industrial estate SIPCOT is situated.

It has Arinnar Anna Higher secondary school for Boys. Government Girls Higher Secondary School, Masilaman Mudaliyar Higher Secondary School.

== See also ==
- Walajabad taluk
