= 1991 Indian general election in Tamil Nadu =

Indian general election in Tamil Nadu, 1991
- May–June 1991

39 (of 521) seats in the Lok Sabha
- Registered: 39,917,777
- Turnout: 25,514,736 (63.92%) ▼2.94%
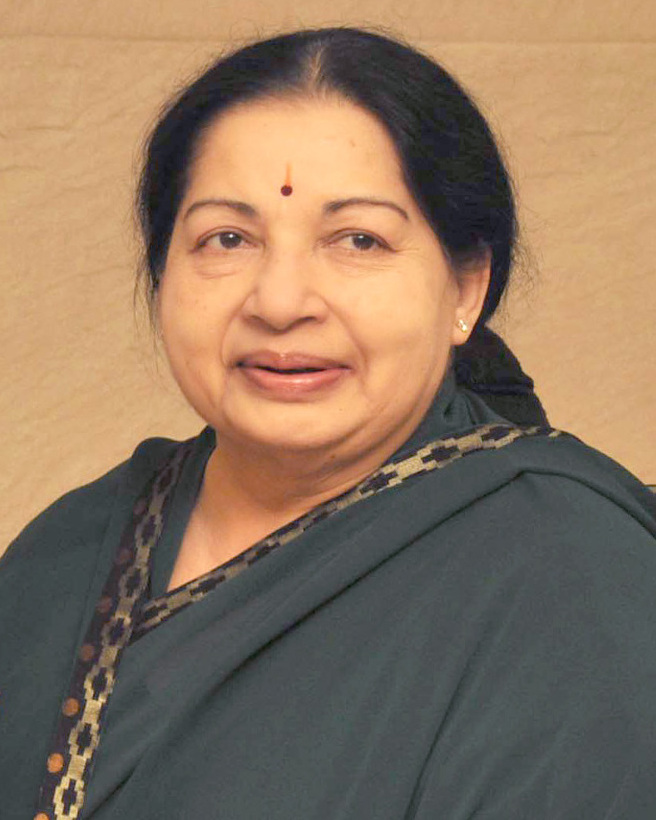

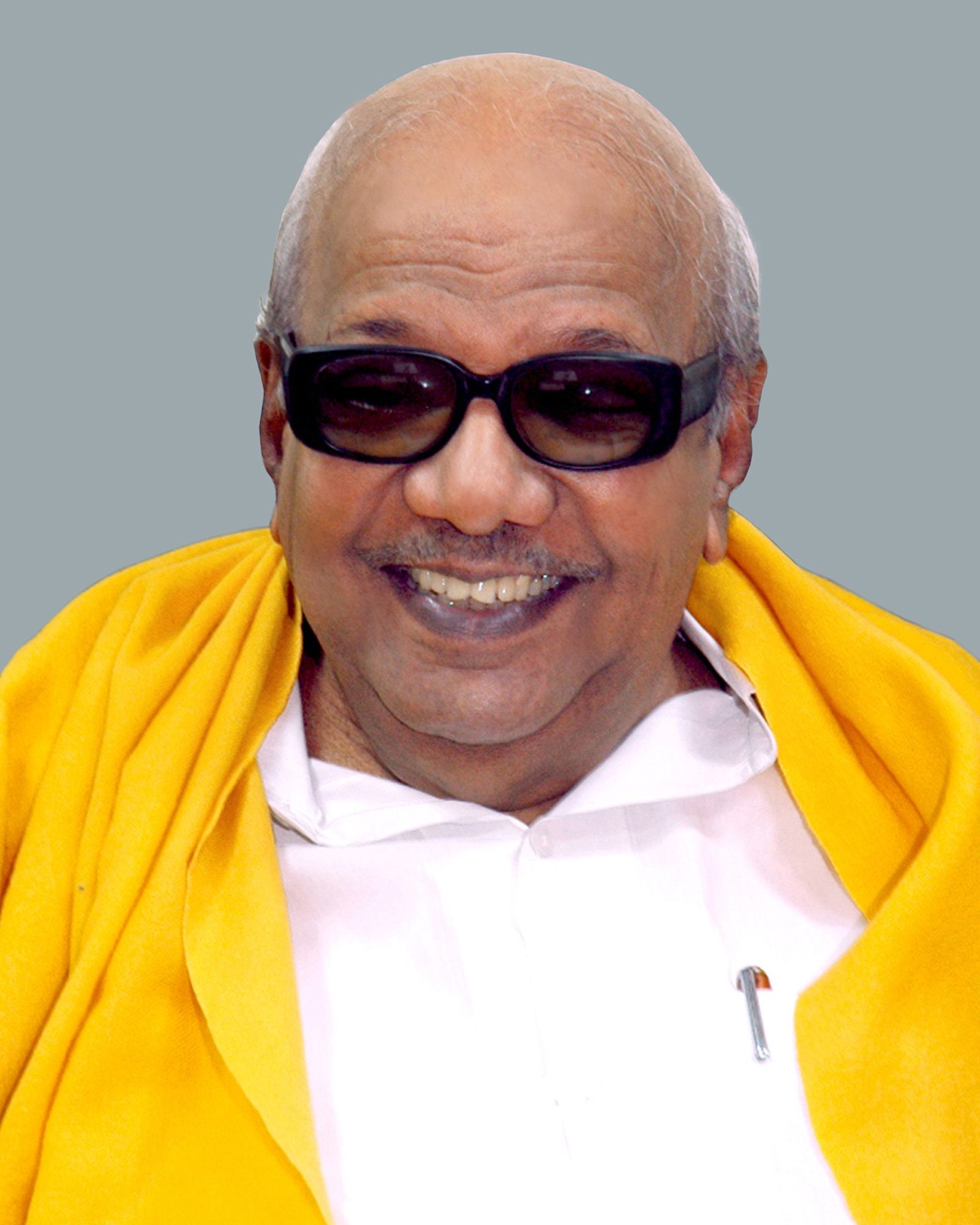
	First party	Second party
Leader	J. Jayalalithaa	M. Karunanidhi
Party	AIADMK	DMK
Alliance	Congress alliance	NF+LF
Leader's seat	Did not contest	Did not contest
Seats won	39	0
Seat change	▲1	▼1
Popular vote	14,981,111	6,823,581
Percentage	60.67%	27.64%
Swing	▲3.69%	▼2.48%
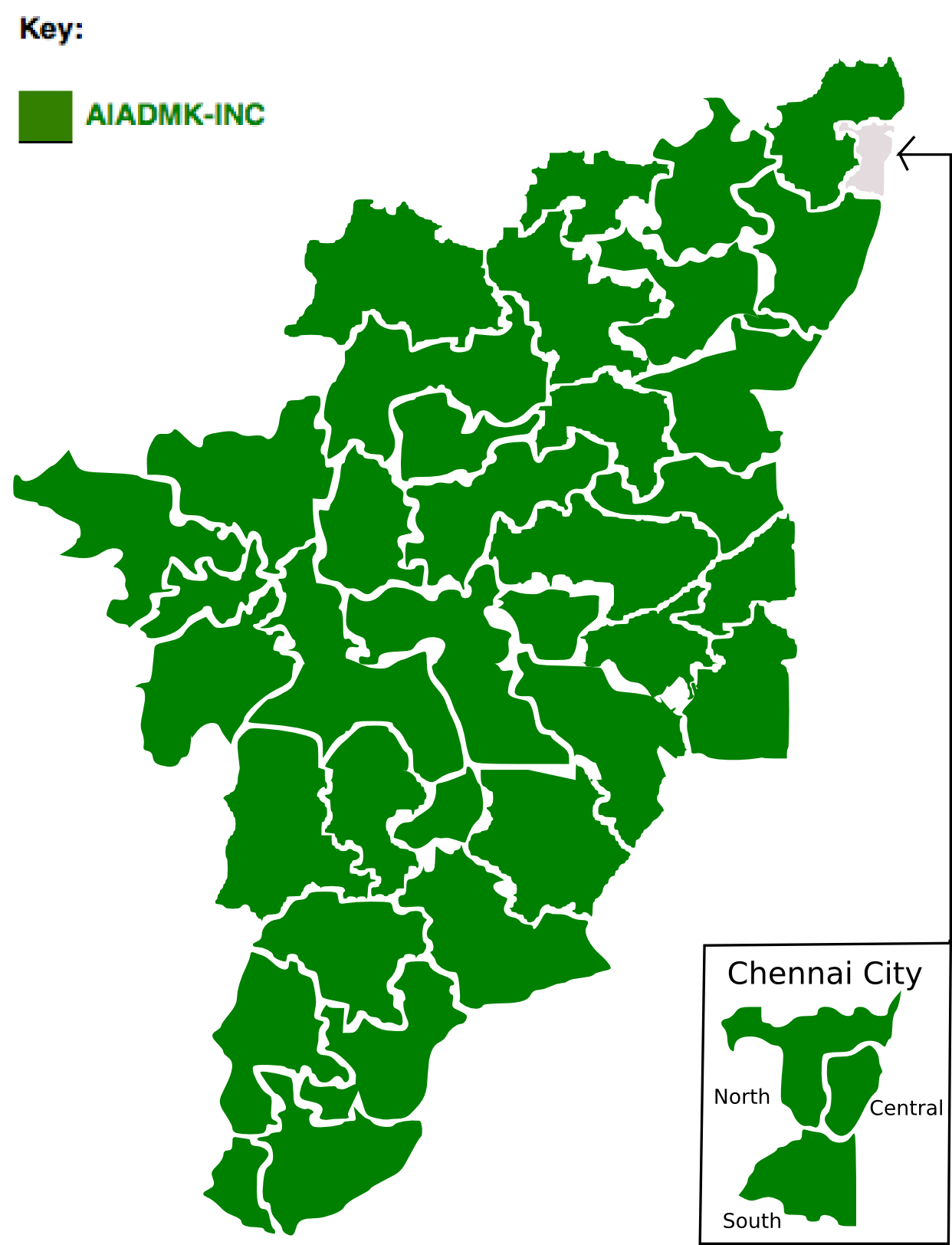
- 1991 Election map (by constituencies); Green = INC+ (Won all the seats)

- Seat wise Result
Prime Minister before election
Chandra Shekhar
SJP
Prime Minister after election
P. V. Narasimha Rao
INC(I)

The 1991 Indian general election polls in Tamil Nadu were held for 39 seats in the state. The result was a repeat landslide victory for Indian National Congress, and its ally All India Anna Dravida Munnetra Kazhagam, winning all 39 seats. The opposition party Dravida Munnetra Kazhagam, which was part of the National Front, lost heavily, not winning a single seat. During this election, Rajiv Gandhi was assassinated, when campaigning for Margatham Chandrasekar for the Indian National Congress, in the Sriperumbudur constituency.

== Seat Allotment ==
=== Congress Front ===
AIADMK-led Alliance
Party	Flag	Symbol	Leader	Seats	
Indian National Congress			Rajiv Gandhi	27	28
United Communist Party of India			D. Pandian	1	28
All India Anna Dravida Munnetra Kazhagam			J. Jayalalithaa	11	
Total				39	

=== National Front ===
DMK-led Alliance
Party	Flag	Symbol	Leader	Seats
Dravida Munnetra Kazhagam			M. Karunanidhi	29
Janata Dal			Sivaji Ganesan	5
Communist Party of India (Marxist)			A. Nallasivam	3
Communist Party of India			P. Manickam	2
Total				39

=== PMK Front ===
PMK-led Alliance
Party	Flag	Symbol	Leader	Seats
Pattali Makkal Katchi			Dr. Ramdoss	31
Muslim League (Samad)			A. K. A. Abdul Samad	5
Total				36

== List of Candidates ==
Constituency		AIADMK+		DMK+		PMK	
#	Name	Party	Candidate	Party	Candidate	Party	Candidate
1	Madras North	INC	D. Pandian (Note: United Communist Party of Indua contested on the "Hand" symbol of the Indian National Congress (INC), and is officially recorded as a INC candidate in electoral records.)	DMK	Aladi Aruna	PMK	R. Ramamuthu Kumar
2	Madras Central	INC	Era. Anbarasu	DMK	N. V. N. Somu	PMK	D. Anbazhagan
3	Madras South	ADMK	R. Sridharan	DMK	T. R. Baalu	PMK	K. V. S. Sivaraman
4	Sriperumbudur (SC)	INC	M. Chandrasekar	DMK	K. Sundaram		
5	Chengalpattu	ADMK	S. S. R. Rajendra Kumar	DMK	C. Arumugam	PMK	V. Kamalambal
6	Arakkonam	INC	R. Jeevarathinam	DMK	M. Kannaiyan	PMK	S. Subramaniam
7	Vellore	INC	B. Akber Pasha	DMK	P. Shanmugam	IUML	Mohammad Ishaq
8	Tiruppattur	INC	A. Jayamohan	DMK	K. C. Alagiri	PMK	D. P. Chandran
9	Vandavasi	INC	M. Krishnaswamy	DMK	D. Venugopal	PMK	Durai Kasilingam
10	Tindivanam	INC	K. Rama Murthee	DMK	N. Dhayanithi	PMK	S. Shanmugam
11	Cuddalore	INC	P. P. Kaliaperumal	JD	G. Bhuvaraghan	PMK	G. Chinnadhuri
12	Chidambaram (SC)	INC	P. Vallalperuman	DMK	A. Sulochana	PMK	Dalit Ezhilmalai
13	Dharmapuri	INC	K. V. Thangkabalu	DMK	M. Kandasamy	PMK	P. D. Elangovan
14	Krishnagiri	INC	K. Rama Murthy	JD	R. Manickam	PMK	R. Raju
15	Rasipuram (SC)	INC	B. Devarajan	DMK	I. Suhenya	PMK	P. Jeyapal
16	Salem	INC	R. Kumaramangalam	DMK	K. P. Arthanarisamy	PMK	K. Arjunan
17	Tiruchengode	ADMK	K. S. Soundaram	DMK	K. P. Ramalingam	PMK	A. Mannathan
18	Nilgiris	INC	R. Prabhu	DMK	S. Doraisamy	IUML	K. M. Mohammed Zackariah
19	Gobichettipalayam	ADMK	P. G. Narayanan	JD	G. S. Lakshmanaiyer	PMK	S. Chinnadurai
20	Coimbatore	INC	C. K. Kuppuswamy	CPI(M)	K. Ramani	IUML	A. Abeeb Rahman
21	Pollachi (SC)	ADMK	B. Raja Ravi Varma	DMK	C. T. Dhandapani	PMK	G. Selvaraj
22	Palani	INC	A. Senapathi Gounder	DMK	K. Kumarsamy		
23	Dindigul	ADMK	C. Sreenivasan	DMK	Maya Thevar	PMK	P. Gopal
24	Madurai	INC	A. G. S. Ram Babu	CPI(M)	P. Mohan	PMK	R. Tamil Selvan
25	Periyakulam	ADMK	R. Ramasamy	DMK	R. Ramakrishnan	PMK	K. Madasamy
26	Karur	ADMK	N. Murugesan	DMK	D. Thirunavukkarasu	PMK	R. Pakkian
27	Tiruchirappalli	INC	L. Adaikalaraj	CPI(M)	T. K. Rangarajan		
28	Perambalur (SC)	ADMK	A. Asokraj	DMK	S. V. Ramaswamy	PMK	J. Sivagnanamani
29	Mayiladuthurai	INC	Mani Shankar Aiyar	DMK	P. Kalayanam Kuttalam	IUML	A. K. A. Abdul Samad
30	Nagapattinam (SC)	INC	Padma	CPI	M. Selvarasu	PMK	U. Kasinathan
31	Thanjavur	INC	K. Thulasiah Vandayar	DMK	S. S. Palanimanickam	PMK	H. Shahul Hameed
32	Pudukkottai	INC	N. Sundarraj	DMK	K. Chandrasekaran	PMK	V. Thiruvarangan
33	Sivaganga	INC	P. Chidambaram	DMK	V. Kasinathan	PMK	A. Sathaiah
34	Ramanathapuram	INC	V. Rajeswaran	DMK	Kadher Batcha	IUML	A. A. Abdul Razak
35	Sivakasi	ADMK	R. Kanga Govindarajulu	CPI	A. Sri Nivasan	PMK	K. Puyal Ponnaiah
36	Tirunelveli	ADMK	R. Janarthanan	DMK	K. P. Kandasamy	PMK	S. Krishnakanthan
37	Tenkasi (SC)	INC	M. Arunachalam	DMK	T. Sadhan	PMK	E. Nambirajan
38	Tiruchendur	INC	R. Dhanuskodi	JD	G. Anton Gomez	PMK	R. Christa Doss
39	Nagercoil	INC	N. Dennis	JD	P. Md. Ismail	PMK	K. James

== Voting and results ==
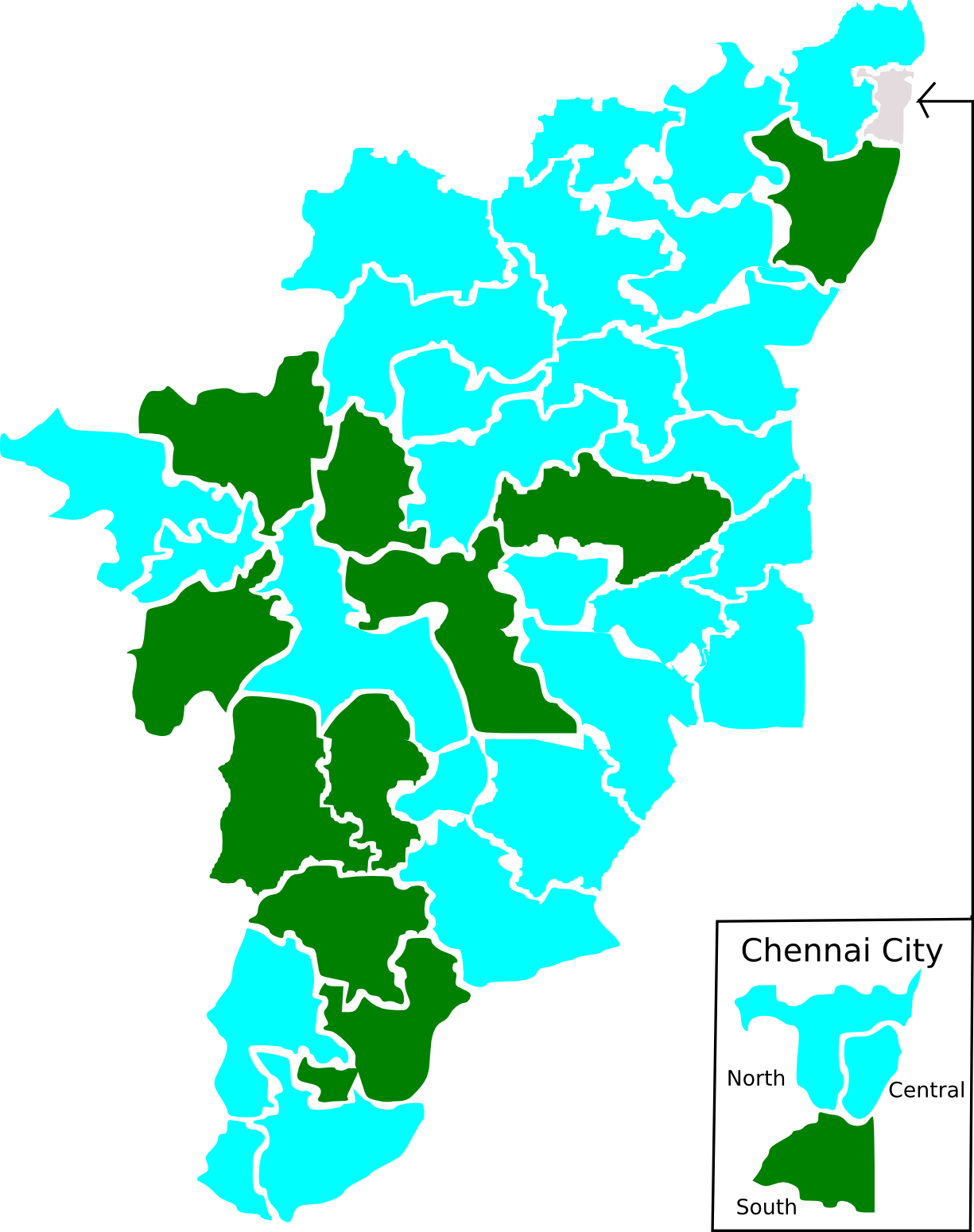
Election map of results based on parties. Colours are based on the results table on the left

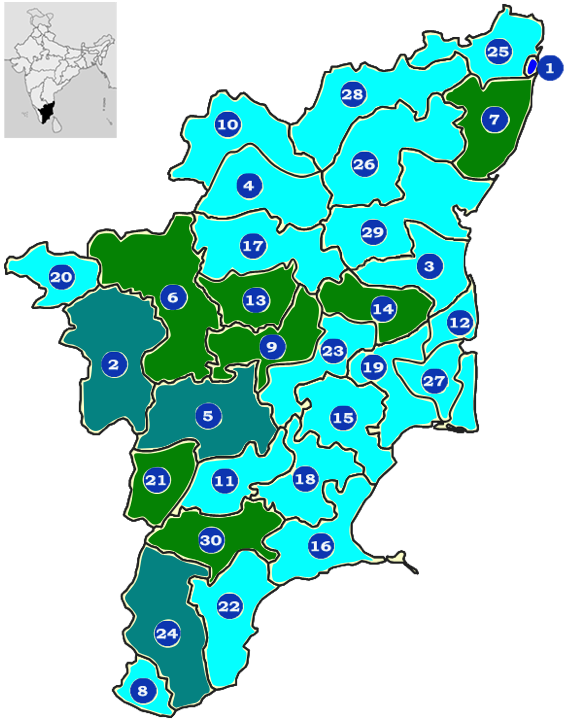
Election Map (Results reflected as %seats won by districts) AIADMK-INC alliance won all the seats in TN. Below is a breakdown by parties within coalition: INC won all the seats in the district INC won 67% the seats in the district INC won half the seats in the district ADMK won all the seats in the district

Alliance	Party	Popular Vote	Percentage	Swing	Seats won	Seat Change
AIADMK+	Indian National Congress	10,510,569	42.57%	▲2.71%	28	▲1
AIADMK+	All India Anna Dravida Munnetra Kazhagam	4,470,542	18.10%	▲0.98%	11	Steady
AIADMK+	Total	14,981,111	60.67%	▲3.69%	39	▲1
National Front	Dravida Munnetra Kazhagam	5,601,597	22.69%	▼3.97%	0	Steady
National Front	Janata Dal	718,222	2.91%	▲1.49%	0	Steady
National Front	Communist Party of India	503,762	2.04%	Steady	0	▼1
National Front	Total	6,823,581	27.64%	▼2.48%	0	▼1
Pattali Makkal Katchi		1,269,690	5.14%	▼0.68%	0	Steady
Independents		353,719	1.43%	▼0.84%	0	Steady
Other Parties (16 parties)		1,264,233	5.12%	▲0.31%	0	Steady
Total		24,692,334	100.00%	Steady	39	Steady
Valid Votes		24,692,334	96.78%			
Invalid Votes		822,402	3.22%			
Total Votes		25,514,736	100.00%			
Registered Voters/Turnout		39,917,777	63.92%	▼2.94%		

== List of Elected MPs ==
Constituency		Winner				Runner Up				Margin	%
#	Name	Candidate	Party	Votes	%	Candidate	Party	Votes	%	Margin	%
1	Madras North	D. Pandian	INC	400,454	54.61	Aladi Aruna	DMK	281,936	38.45	118,518	16.16
2	Madras Central	Era Anbarasu	INC	312,302	56.40	N. V. N. Somu	DMK	209,031	37.75	103,271	18.65
3	Madras South	R. Sridharan	ADMK	418,493	56.66	T. R. Balu	DMK	255,965	34.66	162,528	22.00
4	Sriperumbudur (SC)	M. Chandrasekar	INC	400,741	61.71	K. Sundaram	DMK	220,169	33.91	180,572	27.80
5	Chengalpattu	S. S. R. Rajendra Kumar	ADMK	351,613	55.08	C. Arumugam	DMK	198,407	31.08	153,206	24.00
6	Arakkonam	R. Jeevarathinam	INC	348,516	53.90	M. Kannaiyan	DMK	171,806	26.57	176,710	27.33
7	Vellore	B. Akber Pasha	INC	383,177	61.70	P. Shanmugam	DMK	184,008	29.63	199,169	32.07
8	Tiruppattur	A. Jaya Mohan	INC	387,649	60.12	K. C. Alagiri	DMK	197,188	30.58	190,461	29.54
9	Vandavasi	M. Krishnaswamy	INC	354,451	55.55	D. Venugopal	DMK	177,356	27.79	177,095	27.76
10	Tindivanam	K. Rama Murthee	INC	341,971	55.40	N. Dhayanithi	DMK	171,822	27.83	170,149	27.57
11	Cuddalore	P. P. Kaliaperumal	INC	360,445	58.44	G. Bhuvarahan	JD	152,388	24.71	208,057	33.73
12	Chidambaram (SC)	P. Vallalperuman	INC	306,121	48.77	Sulochana Ayyasamy	DMK	169,231	26.96	136,890	21.81
13	Dharmapuri	K. V. Thangka Balu	INC	322,138	51.17	P. D. Elangovan	PMK	171,649	27.27	150,489	23.90
14	Krishnagiri	K. Rama Murthy	INC	353,033	60.72	R. Manickam	JD	139,919	24.06	213,114	36.66
15	Rasipuram (SC)	B. Devarajan	INC	422,400	69.17	I. Suhenya	DMK	149,415	24.47	272,985	44.70
16	Salem	R. Kumarā́mangalam	INC	406,042	67.03	K. P. Arthanarisamy	DMK	123,474	20.38	282,568	46.65
17	Tiruchengode	K. S. Soundaram	ADMK	521,580	66.80	K. P. Ramalingam	DMK	207,099	26.52	314,481	40.28
18	Nilgiris	R. Prabhu	INC	387,707	58.75	S. Doraisamy	DMK	206,905	31.35	180,802	27.40
19	Gobichettipalayam	P. G. Narayanan	ADMK	397,431	67.16	G. S. Lakshmanaiyer	JD	148,270	25.06	249,161	42.10
20	Coimbatore	C. K. Kuppuswamy	INC	408,891	58.67	K. Ramani	CPI(M)	222,827	31.97	186,064	26.70
21	Pollachi (SC)	B. Rajaravivarma	ADMK	414,810	65.65	C. T. Dhandapani	DMK	208,540	33.00	206,270	32.65
22	Palani	A. Senapathi Gounder	INC	445,897	69.18	K. Kumarsamy	DMK	185,755	28.82	260,142	40.36
23	Dindigul	C. Srinivasan	ADMK	416,652	67.04	K. Maya Thevar	DMK	192,235	30.93	224,417	36.11
24	Madurai	A. G. S. Ram Babu	INC	425,769	67.62	P. Mohan	CPI(M)	183,609	29.16	242,160	38.46
25	Periyakulam	R. Ramasamy	ADMK	382,759	62.61	Rama Krishanan	DMK	168,799	27.61	213,960	35.00
26	Karur	N. Murugesan	ADMK	475,571	68.89	D. Thirunavukkarasu	DMK	205,602	29.78	269,969	39.11
27	Tiruchirappalli	L. Adaikala Raj	INC	414,628	63.99	T. K. Rangarajan	CPI(M)	204,922	31.63	209,706	32.36
28	Perambalur (SC)	A. Asokraj	ADMK	375,430	58.92	S. V. Ramaswamy	DMK	180,480	28.32	194,950	30.60
29	Mayiladuthurai	Mani Shankar Aiyar	INC	364,598	58.98	P. Kalayanam	DMK	202,661	32.78	161,937	26.20
30	Nagapattinam (SC)	Padma	INC	327,413	49.71	M. Selvarasu	CPI	301,697	45.80	25,716	3.91
31	Thanjavur	K. Thulasiah Vandayar	INC	381,932	61.23	S. Palanimanickam	DMK	219,862	35.25	162,070	25.98
32	Pudukkottai	N. Sundararaj	INC	460,795	63.82	K. Chandrasekaran	DMK	241,074	33.39	219,721	30.43
33	Sivaganga	P. Chindambaram	INC	402,029	67.49	V. Kasinathan	DMK	173,432	29.12	228,597	38.37
34	Ramanathapuram	V. Rajeshwaran	INC	348,415	59.25	S. Kather Batcha	DMK	176,889	30.08	171,526	29.17
35	Sivakasi	R. Kanga Govindarajulu	ADMK	365,155	55.21	A. Sri Nivasan	CPI	202,065	30.55	163,090	24.66
36	Tirunelveli	M. R. Janarthanan	ADMK	351,048	62.09	K. P. Kandasamy	DMK	197,456	34.92	153,592	27.17
37	Tenkasi (SC)	M. Arunachalam	INC	381,721	63.56	T. Sadhan	DMK	199,635	33.24	182,086	30.32
38	Tiruchendur	R. Dhanushkodi	INC	381,521	73.43	G. Anton Gomez	JD	122,745	23.62	258,776	49.81
39	Nagercoil	N. Dennis	INC	279,813	51.60	P. Muhammadd Ismail	JD	154,900	28.56	124,913	23.04

== Key positions held by elected members of parliament ==
=== Union ministers of state (independent charge) ===
No.	Portrait	Name (Birth–Death)	Elected constituency	Portfolio	Term in office			Political party
No.	Portrait	Name (Birth–Death)	Elected constituency	Portfolio	Assumed office	Left office	Time in office	Political party
1		P. Chidambaram (b. 1945)	Sivaganga	Ministry of Commerce	21 June 1991	9 July 1992	2 years, 71 days	Indian National Congress
1		P. Chidambaram (b. 1945)	Sivaganga	Ministry of Commerce	10 February 1995	3 April 1996	2 years, 71 days	Indian National Congress
2		Valappaddy K. Ramamurthy (1940–2002)	Krishnagiri	Ministry of Labour	21 June 1991	30 July 1991	39 days	Indian National Congress

=== Union ministers of state ===
No.	Portrait	Name (Birth–Death)	Elected constituency	Portfolio	Term in office			Political party	Cabinet Minister
No.	Portrait	Name (Birth–Death)	Elected constituency	Portfolio	Assumed office	Left office	Time in office	Political party	Cabinet Minister
1		M. Arunachalam (1944–2004)	Tenkasi	Ministry of Urban Development	21 June 1991	18 January 1993	1 year, 211 days	Indian National Congress	Sheila Kaul
1		M. Arunachalam (1944–2004)	Tenkasi	Ministry of Small Scale Industries and Agro Industries	18 January 1993	3 April 1996	3 years, 76 days	Indian National Congress	K. Karunakaran
2		Rangarajan Kumaramangalam (1952–2000)	Salem	Ministry of Parliamentary Affairs	21 June 1991	2 July 1992	1 year, 11 days	Indian National Congress	Ghulam Nabi Azad
2		Rangarajan Kumaramangalam (1952–2000)	Salem	Ministry of Law and Justice and Company Affairs	21 June 1991	2 July 1992	1 year, 11 days	Indian National Congress	Kotla Vijaya Bhaskara Reddy
2		Rangarajan Kumaramangalam (1952–2000)	Salem	Ministry of Science and Technology	2 July 1992	2 December 1993	1 year, 153 days	Indian National Congress	P. V. Narasimha Rao
2		Rangarajan Kumaramangalam (1952–2000)	Salem	Ministry of Parliamentary Affairs	2 July 1992	2 December 1993	1 year, 153 days	Indian National Congress	Ghulam Nabi Azad Vidya Charan Shukla

== Bypolls (1991-1996) ==
District	Constituency		Winner				Runner up				Margin
District	No.	Name	Candidate	Party	Votes	%	Candidate	Party	Votes	%	Margin
Dindigul		Palani	Palaniyappa Gounder Kumarasamy	AIADMK	278,995	42.4%	Smt. Subbulakshmi	DMK	234,070	35.6%	44,925
Dindigul		Palani	Bypoll held on 18 December 1993 following the death of the incumbent member A. Senapathi Gounder from Indian National Congress on 25 February 1992								

== See also ==
- Elections in India
- Elections in Tamil Nadu
