= 1999 Indian general election in Tamil Nadu =

Indian general election in Tamil Nadu, 1999
- 5 and 11 September 1999

39 (of 543) seats in the Lok Sabha
- Registered: 4,77,33,664
- Turnout: 2,76,76,543 (57.98%) ▲0.03%
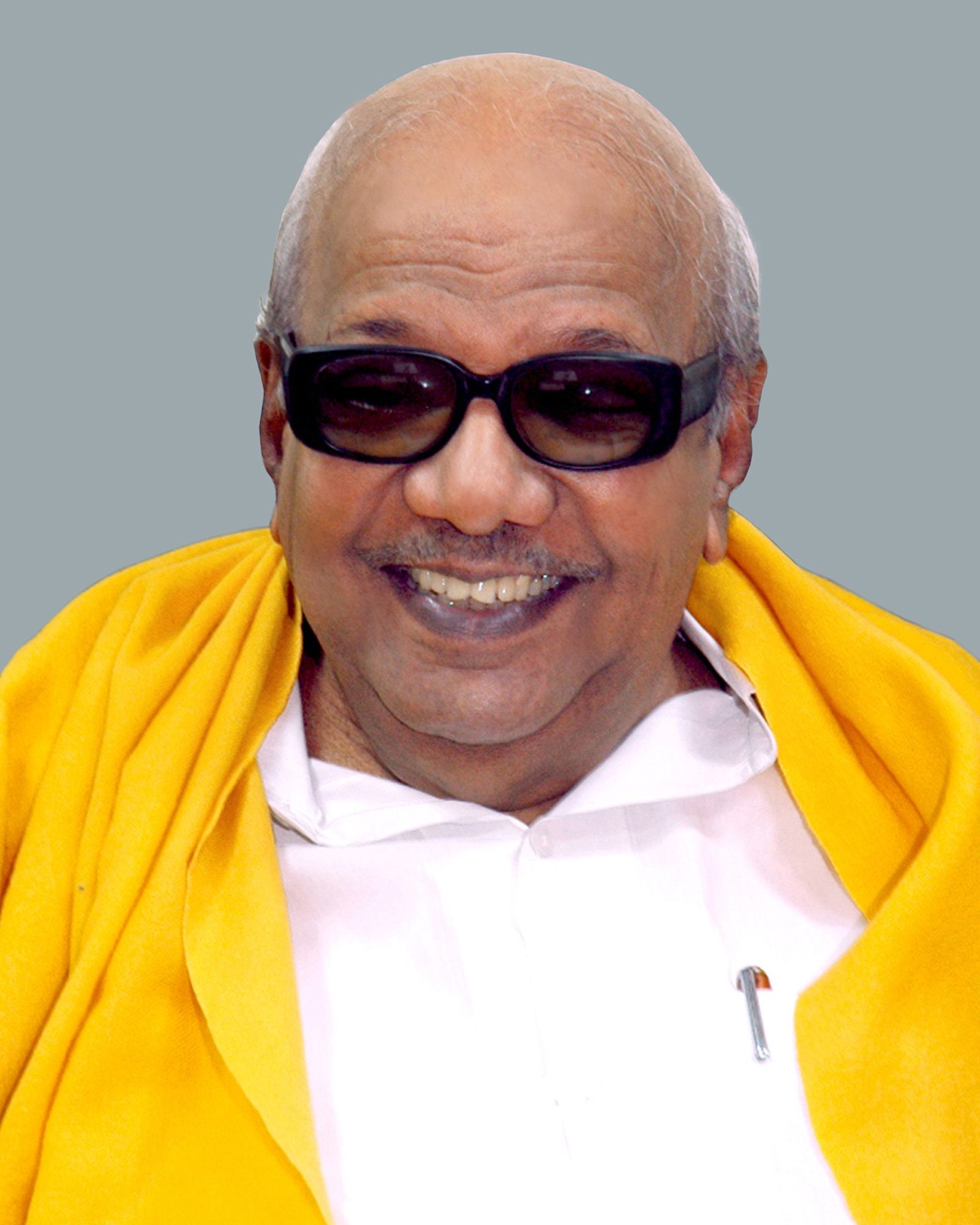

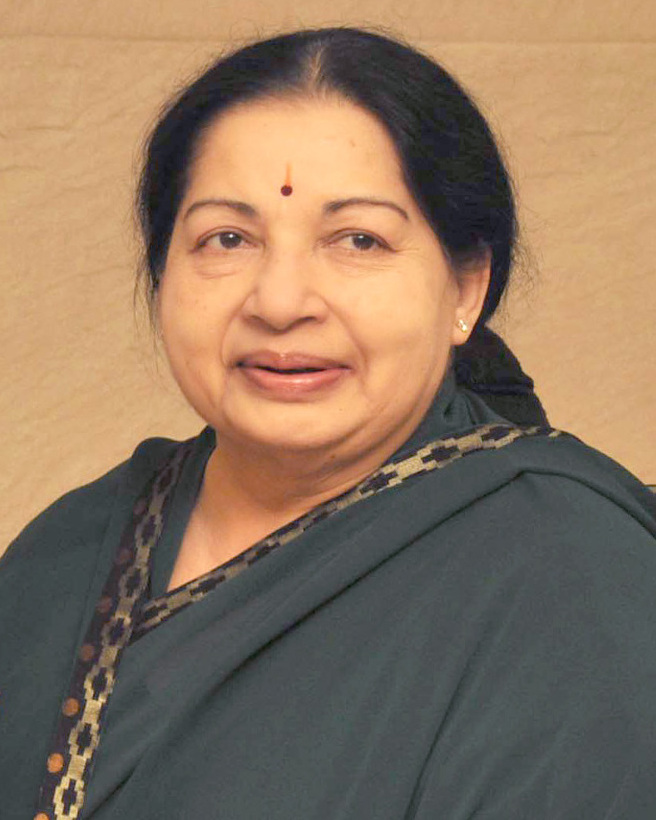
	First party	Second party
Leader	M. Karunanidhi	J. Jayalalithaa
Party	DMK	AIADMK
Alliance	NDA	Congress Alliance +LF
Seats won	26	13
Seat change	▲10	▼6
Popular vote	1,28,35,960	1,13,49,388
Percentage	47.13%	41.69%
Swing	▲5.36%	▲7.94%
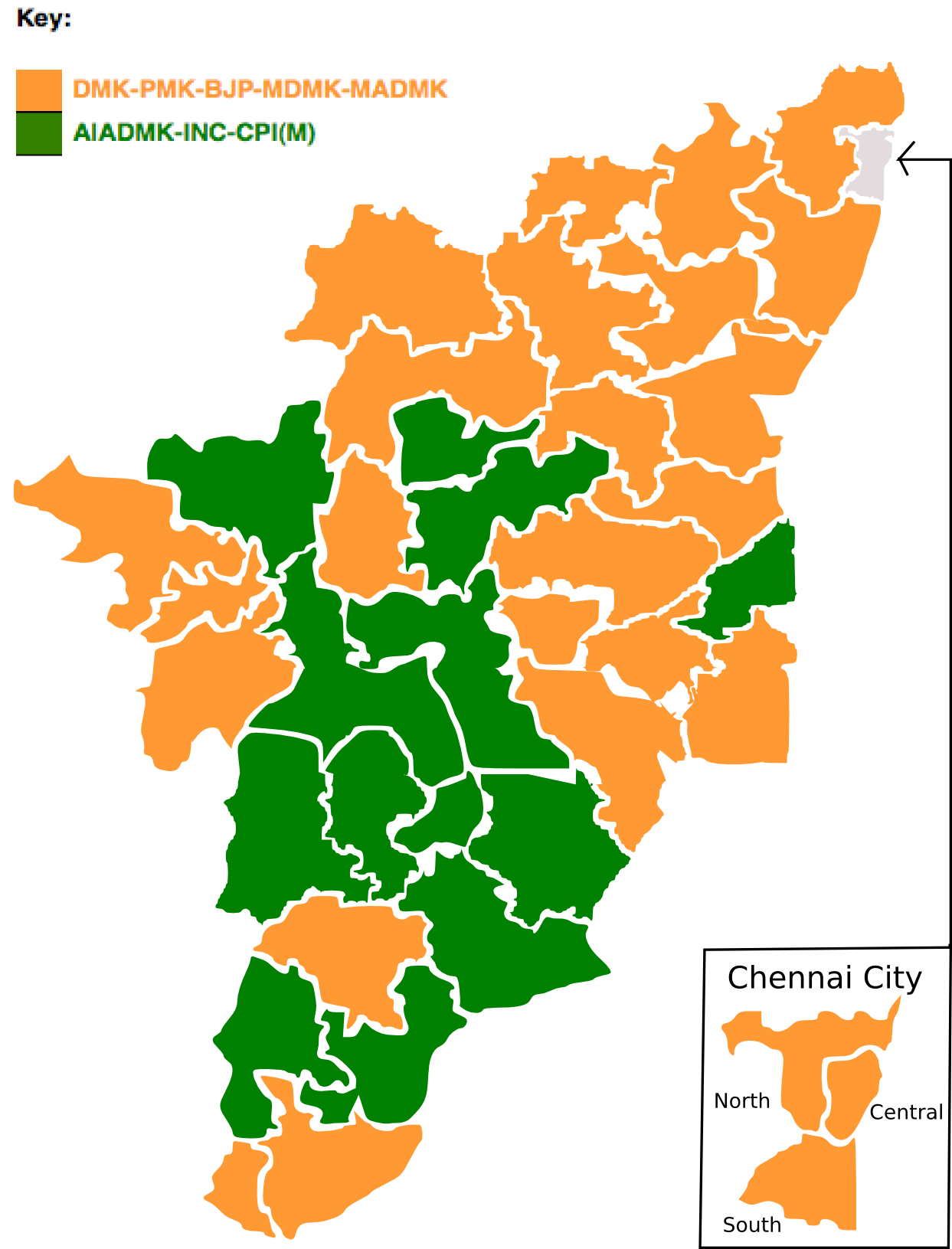
- 1999 Election map (by constituencies); Saffron = NDA and Green = INC+

Prime Minister before election
Atal Bihari Vajpayee
BJP
Prime Minister after election
Atal Bihari Vajpayee
BJP

The 1999 Indian general election polls in Tamil Nadu were held for 39 seats in the state. The result was a victory for the National Democratic Alliance (NDA) which won 26 seats. After leaving the NDA, All India Anna Dravida Munnetra Kazhagam, hoped to create some damage, but ended up losing 8 seats, compared to the 1998 Lok Sabha elections. This is also the first time that Dravida Munnetra Kazhagam, allied with the Bharatiya Janata Party, helping them have power at the national level for the next 5 years with the NDA, before they joined the UPA. The NDA, ended up losing 3 seats, compared to the election the year before, due to AIADMK leaving the NDA, but the seats were made up, because DMK left the united front and joined the NDA.

== Election schedule ==
The polling schedule for the 1999 General Elections was announced by the Chief Election Commissioner on 11 July 1999.

Poll event	Phase	
Poll event	I	II
Notification date	11 August 1999	17 August 1999
Last date for filing nomination	18 August 1999	24 August 1999
Scrutiny of nomination	19 August 1999	25 August 1999
Last Date for withdrawal of nomination	21 August 1999	27 August 1999
Date of poll	5 September 1999	11 September 1999
Date of counting of votes/Result	6 October 1999	
No. of constituencies	19	20

Voting Phases
I (19 seats)	II (20 seats)
Tindivanam; Cuddalore; Chidambaram; Rasipuram; Madurai; Karur; Tiruchirappalli; Perambalur; Mayiladuthurai; Nagapattinam; Thanjavur; Pudukkottai; Sivaganga; Ramanathapuram; Sivakasi; Tirunelveli; Tenkasi; Tiruchendur; Nagercoil	Chennai North; Chennai Central; Chennai South; Sriperumbudur; Chengalpattu; Arakkonam; Vellore; Tiruppattur; Vandavasi; Dharmapuri; Krishnagiri; Salem; Tiruchengode; Nilgiris; Gobichettipalayam; Coimbatore; Pollachi; Palani; Dindigul; Periyakulam

== Seat allotments ==
=== National Democratic Alliance ===
National Democratic Alliance
Party	Flag	Symbol	Leader	Seat(s) Contested	
Dravida Munnetra Kazhagam			M. Karunanidhi	18	19
MGR Kazhagam			R. M. Veerappan	1	19
Pattali Makkal Katchi			Dr. Ramdoss	7	
Bharatiya Janata Party			K. N. Lakshmanan	6	
Marumalarchi Dravida Munnetra Kazhagam			Vaiko	5	
MGR Anna Dravida Munnetra Kazhagam			Su. Thirunavukkarasar	1	
Tamizhaga Rajiv Congress			Vazhappady K. Ramamurthy	1	
Total				39	

=== AIADMK-Congress Alliance ===
AIADMK-led Alliance
Party	Flag	Symbol	Leader	Seats
All India Anna Dravida Munnetra Kazhagam			J. Jayalalithaa	23
Indian National League			M. Abdul Lathief	1
Indian National Congress			Tindivanam K. Ramamurthy	11
Communist Party of India (Marxist)			N. Sankaraiah	2
Communist Party of India			R. Nallakannu	2
Total				39

=== Democratic People Progressive Alliance ===
Democratic People Progressive Alliance
Party	Flag	Symbol	Leader	Seat(s) Contested	
Tamil Maanila Congress			G. K. Moopanar	22	27
Republican Party of India			C. K. Tamilarasan	2	27
Viduthalai Chiruthaigal Katchi			Thol. Thirumavalavan	2	27
Indian Union Muslim League			K. M. Kader Mohideen	1	27
Puthiya Tamilagam			K. Krishnasamy	10	
Janata Dal (Secular) (Note: This Symbol was used by JD(S) until 2001)			H. D. Deve Gowda	2	
Total				39	

== List of Candidates ==
Constituency		NDA		AIADMK+		TMC(M)+	
#	Name	Party	Candidate	Party	Candidate	Party	Candidate
1	Chennai North	DMK	C. Kuppusami	CPI(M)	N. Soundararajan	TMC	J. M. Aaroon Rashid
2	Chennai Central	DMK	Murasoli Maran	ADMK	M. Abdul Lathief (Note: Indian National League candidate contested on the "Two Leaves" symbol of the All India Anna Dravida Munnetra Kazhagam (ADMK), and is officially recorded as a ADMK candidate in electoral records.)	PT	R. Janaki Ammal
3	Chennai South	DMK	T. R. Baalu	INC	V. Dhandayuthapani	TMC	Muktha Srinivasan
4	Sriperumbudur	DMK	A. Krishnaswamy	ADMK	K. Venugopal	TMC	J. Pushparaman
5	Chengalpattu	PMK	A. K. Moorthy	ADMK	S. S. Thirunavukkarasu	JD(S)	C. Balaraman
6	Arakkonam	DMK	S. Jagatrakshakan (Note: MGR Kazhagam candidate contested on the "Rising Sun" symbol of the Dravida Munnetra Kazhagam (DMK), and is officially recorded as a DMK candidate in electoral records.)	INC	K. V. Thangabalu	TMC	A. M. Velu
7	Vellore	PMK	N. T. Shanmugam	ADMK	Mohammad Asif	TMC	C. K. Thamizharasan (Note: Republican Party of India candidate contested on the "Cycle" symbol of the Tamil Maanila Congress (TMC), and is officially recorded as a TMC candidate in electoral records.)
8	Tiruppattur	DMK	D. Venugopal	ADMK	A. R. Rajendran	TMC	A. Jayamohan
9	Vandavasi	PMK	M. Durai	INC	M. Krishnaswamy	TMC	K. A. Wahab (Note: Indian Union Muslim League candidate contested on the "Cycle" symbol of the Tamil Maanila Congress (TMC), and is officially recorded as a TMC candidate in electoral records.)
10	Tindivanam	MDMK	N. Ramachandran	INC	K. Ramamurthy	TMC	S. P. Subramanian
11	Cuddalore	DMK	Adhi Sankar	ADMK	M. C. Dhamodaran	TMC	P. R. S. Venkatesan
12	Chidambaram	PMK	E. Ponnuswamy	INC	T. Sumathi Udayakumar	TMC	Thol. Thirumavalavan (Note: Viduthalai Chiruthaigal Katchi candidate contested on the "Cycle" symbol of the Tamil Maanila Congress (TMC), and is officially recorded as a TMC candidate in electoral records.)
13	Dharmapuri	PMK	P. D. Elangovan	ADMK	K. P. Munusamy	TMC	M. C. Rajendran
14	Krishnagiri	DMK	V. Vetriselvam	ADMK	M. Thambidurai	JD(S)	G. A. Vadivelu
15	Rasipuram	PMK	S. Uthayarasu	ADMK	V. Saroja	TMC	Dr. C. Natesan
16	Salem	TRC	K. Ramamurthy	ADMK	T. M. Selvaganapathy	TMC	R. Devadass
17	Tiruchengode	MDMK	M. Kannappan	ADMK	K. Palanisamy	PT	T. M. Kanagasabapathi
18	Nilgiris	BJP	M. Master Mathan	INC	R. Prabhu	PT	C. Chinnaraj
19	Gobichettipalayam	DMK	K. G. S. Arjun	ADMK	K. K. Kaliappan	TMC	C. K. Kuppuswamy
20	Coimbatore	BJP	C. P. Radhakrishnan	CPI	R. Nallakannu	TMC	S. R. Balasubramaniam
21	Pollachi	MDMK	C. Krishnan	ADMK	M. Thiyagarajan	PT	M. Jothiraj
22	Palani	MDMK	A. Ganeshamurthi	ADMK	P. Kumarasamy	TMC	S. K. Kharventhan
23	Dindigul	DMK	S. Chandrasekar	ADMK	C. Sreenivasan	TMC	N. S. V. Chitthan
24	Madurai	DMK	Pon. Muthuramalingam	CPI(M)	P. Mohan	TMC	A. G. S. Ram Babu
25	Periyakulam	DMK	P. Selvendran	ADMK	T. T. V. Dhinakaran	PT	A. Manssoor Alikhan
26	Karur	DMK	K. C. Palanisamy	ADMK	M. Chinnasamy	TMC	K. Natrayan
27	Tiruchirappalli	BJP	R. Kumaramangalam	INC	L. Adaikalaraj	TMC	M. Rajasekharan
28	Perambalur	DMK	A. Raja	ADMK	P. Rajarathnam	TMC	D. Periyasamy
29	Mayiladuthurai	PMK	P. D. Arul Mozhi	INC	Mani Shankar Aiyar	TMC	K. Krishnamoorthy
30	Nagapattinam	DMK	A. K. S. Vijayan	CPI	M. Selvarasu	PT	T. Nadaiyazhagan
31	Thanjavur	DMK	S. S. Palanimanickam	ADMK	K. Thangamuthu	TMC	Pl. A. Chidambaram
32	Pudukkottai	MADMK	Su. Thirunavukkarasar	INC	S. Singaravadivel	PT	M. Palaniappan
33	Sivaganga	BJP	H. Raja	INC	E. M. Sudarsana	TMC	P. Chidambaram
34	Ramanathapuram	DMK	M. S. K. Bhavani	ADMK	K. Malaisamy	PT	Dr. K. Nazeera Parvin
35	Sivakasi	MDMK	Vaiko	ADMK	V. Ramaswami	TMC	A. Gunasekaran
36	Tirunelveli	DMK	P. Geetha Jeevan	ADMK	P. H. Pandian	PT	P. V. Bakthavatchalam
37	Tenkasi	BJP	S. Arumugam	ADMK	S. Murugesan	PT	K. Krishnasamy
38	Tiruchendur	DMK	A. D. K. Jayaseelan	ADMK	B. P. Rajan	TMC	R. Dhanuskodi Athithan
39	Nagercoil	BJP	Pon Radhakrishnan	INC	N. Dennis	TMC	D. Kumaradas

== Voting and results ==
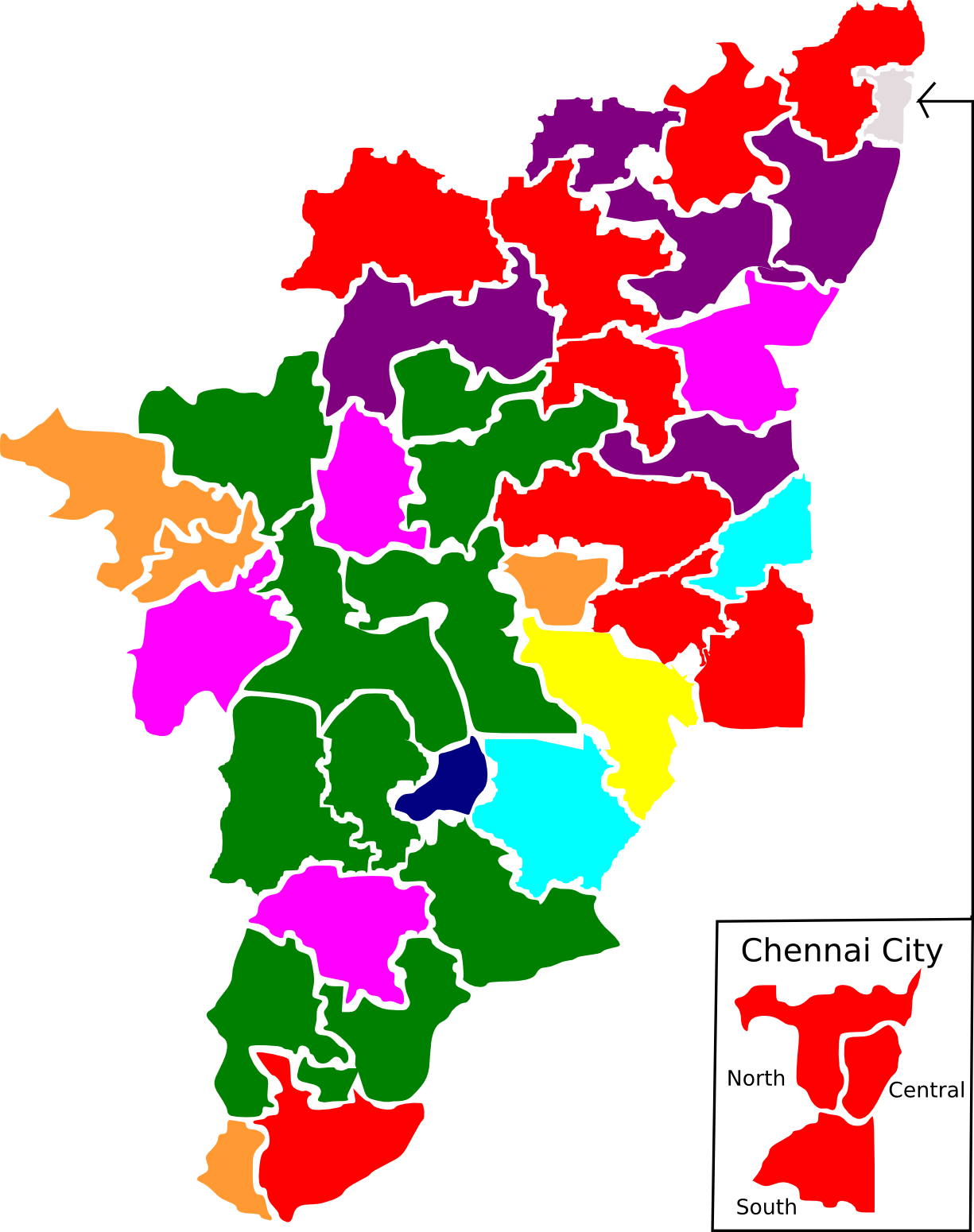
Election map of results based on parties. Colours are based on the results table on the left

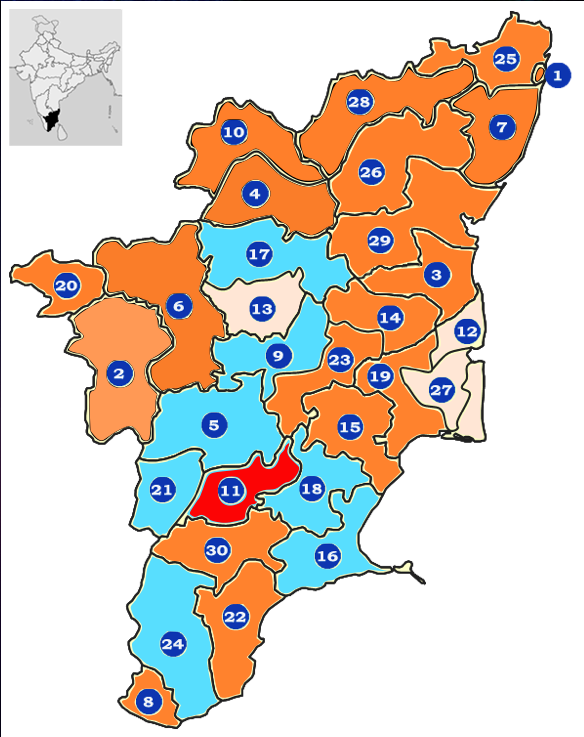
Election Map (Results reflected as %seats won by districts) DMK-BJP alliance won all the seats in this district DMK-BJP alliance won 67% of the seats (Coimbatore) DMK-BJP alliance won half the seats in this district AIADMK-INC alliance won all the seats in this district CPI(M) won the lone seat in this district (Madurai)

Alliance	Party	Popular Vote	Percentage	Swing	Seats won	Seat Change
National Democratic Alliance	Dravida Munnetra Kazhagam	6,298,832	23.13%	▲3.05%	12	▲7
National Democratic Alliance	Pattali Makkal Katchi	2,236,821	8.21%	▲2.16%	5	▲1
National Democratic Alliance	Bharatiya Janata Party	1,945,286	7.14%	▲0.28%	4	▲1
National Democratic Alliance	Marumalarchi Dravida Munnetra Kazhagam	1,620,527	5.95%	▼0.31%	4	▲1
National Democratic Alliance	MGR Anna Dravida Munnetra Kazhagam	396,216	1.46%	▲0.37%	1	▲1
National Democratic Alliance	Tamizhaga Rajiv Congress	338,278	1.24%	▼0.19%	0	▼1
National Democratic Alliance	Total	12,835,960	47.13%	▲5.36%	26	▲10
AIADMK+	All India Anna Dravida Munnetra Kazhagam	6,992,003	25.68%	▼0.21%	10	▼8
AIADMK+	Indian National Congress	3,022,107	11.10%	▲6.32%	2	▲2
AIADMK+	Communist Party of India (Marxist)	639,516	2.35%	▲1.72%	1	▲1
AIADMK+	Communist Party of India	695,762	2.56%	▲0.11%	0	▼1
AIADMK+	Total	11,349,388	41.69%	▲7.94%	13	▼6
Tamil Maanila Congress		1,946,899	7.15%	▼13.04%	0	▼3
Independents		339,948	1.25%	▲0.22%	0	Steady
Other Parties (20 parties)		759,084	2.78%	▼0.48%	0	Steady
Total		27,231,279	100.00%	Steady	39	Steady
Valid Votes		27,231,279	98.39%			
Invalid Votes		445,264	1.61%			
Total Votes		27,676,543	100.00%			
Registered Voters/Turnout		47,733,664	57.98%	▲0.03%		

†: Seat change represents seats won in terms of the current alliances, which is considerably different from the last election.
‡: Vote % reflects the percentage of votes the party received compared to the entire electorate that voted in this election. Adjusted (Adj.) Vote %, reflects the % of votes the party received per constituency that they contested.
Sources: Election Commission of India

== List of Elected MPs ==
Constituency			Winner				Runner Up				Margin	%
#	Name	Poll %	Candidate	Party	Votes	%	Candidate	Party	Votes	%	Margin	%
1	Madras North	43.79	C. Kuppusami	DMK	471,101	53.57	N. Soundararajan	CPI(M)	311,312	35.40	159,789	18.17
2	Madras Central	48.46	Murasoli Maran	DMK	364,565	59.00	M. Abdul Lathief	ADMK	227,616	36.84	136,949	22.16
3	Madras South	45.15	T. R. Baalu	DMK	562,221	60.03	V. Dhandayuthapani	INC	322,037	34.39	240,184	25.64
4	Sriperumbudur (SC)	55.02	A. Krishnaswamy	DMK	385,558	52.88	K. Venugopal	ADMK	310,556	42.60	75,002	10.28
5	Chengalpattu	58.32	A. K. Moorthy	PMK	330,551	48.03	S. S. Thirunavukkarasu	ADMK	317,740	46.17	12,811	1.86
6	Arakkonam	66.32	S. Jagathrakshakan	DMK	346,520	47.72	K. V. Thangkabalu	INC	250,876	34.55	95,644	13.17
7	Vellore	60.97	N. T. Shanmugam	PMK	324,547	47.08	Mohamed Asif	ADMK	298,862	43.35	25,685	3.73
8	Tiruppattur	65.17	D. Venugopal	DMK	350,703	47.94	A. R. Rajendran	ADMK	327,090	44.71	23,613	3.23
9	Vandavasi	61.54	M. Durai	PMK	345,539	51.67	M. Krishnasamy	INC	286,342	42.82	59,197	8.85
10	Tindivanam	61.64	Gingee N. Ramachandran	MDMK	323,234	47.28	K. Ramamurthy	INC	313,884	45.92	9,350	1.36
11	Cuddalore	63.76	Adhi Sankar	DMK	358,367	50.49	M. C. Dhamotharan	ADMK	284,414	40.07	73,953	10.42
12	Chidambaram (SC)	66.02	E. Ponnuswamy	PMK	345,331	47.68	Thol. Thirumavalavan	TMC(M)	225,768	31.17	119,563	16.51
13	Dharmapuri	59.42	P. D. Elangovan	PMK	340,162	47.52	K. P. Munusamy	ADMK	314,622	43.96	25,540	3.56
14	Krishnagiri	59.97	V. Vetriselvan	DMK	347,737	51.05	M. Thambidurai	ADMK	315,913	46.38	31,824	4.67
15	Rasipuram (SC)	55.37	V. Saroja	ADMK	304,843	48.46	S. Uthayarasu	PMK	266,438	42.36	38,405	6.10
16	Salem	59.17	T. M. Selvaganapathy	ADMK	363,689	49.73	V. K. Ramamurthy	TRC	338,278	46.26	25,411	3.47
17	Tiruchengode	55.41	M. Kannappan	MDMK	409,293	49.08	K. Palaniswami	ADMK	404,737	48.53	4,556	0.55
18	Nilgiris	55.08	Master Mathan	BJP	369,828	50.73	R. Prabhu	INC	345,869	47.44	23,959	3.29
19	Gobichettipalayam	60.28	K. K. Kaliappan	ADMK	299,184	47.78	K. G. S. Arjun	DMK	269,172	42.99	30,012	4.79
20	Coimbatore	55.63	C. P. Radhakrishnan	BJP	430,068	49.21	R. Nallakannu	CPI	375,991	43.02	54,077	6.19
21	Pollachi (SC)	57.09	C. Krishnan	MDMK	293,038	48.63	M. Thiyagarajan	ADMK	283,523	47.05	9,515	1.58
22	Palani	58.88	P. Kumarasamy	ADMK	297,850	44.78	A. Ganeshamurthi	MDMK	269,133	40.47	28,717	4.31
23	Dindigul	57.46	Dindigul C. Sreenivasan	ADMK	294,794	43.78	S. Chandrasekar	DMK	274,451	40.76	20,343	3.02
24	Madurai	52.41	P. Mohan	CPI(M)	328,204	43.85	Pon. Muthuramalingam	DMK	290,981	38.88	37,223	4.97
25	Periyakulam	59.36	T. T. V. Dhinakaran	ADMK	303,881	46.15	P. Selvendran	DMK	258,075	39.19	45,806	6.96
26	Karur	62.94	M. Chinnasamy	ADMK	334,407	46.46	K. C. Palanisamy	DMK	331,560	46.07	2,847	0.39
27	Tiruchirappalli	56.40	R. Kumaramangalam	BJP	377,450	54.61	L. Adaikalaraj	INC	288,253	41.71	89,197	12.90
28	Perambalur (SC)	65.40	A. Raja	DMK	330,675	48.58	P. Rajarethinam	ADMK	262,624	38.59	68,051	9.99
29	Mayiladuthurai	63.61	Mani Shankar Aiyar	INC	324,384	50.23	P. D. Arul Mozhi	PMK	284,253	44.02	40,131	6.21
30	Nagapattinam (SC)	66.02	A. K. S. Vijayan	DMK	342,237	49.92	M. Selvarasu	CPI	319,771	46.65	22,466	3.27
31	Thanjavur	63.06	S. S. Palanimanickam	DMK	295,191	45.39	K. Thangamuthu	ADMK	262,177	40.31	33,014	5.08
32	Pudukkottai	64.10	Su. Thirunavukkarasar	MGRMK	396,216	51.46	S. Singaravadivel	INC	331,914	43.11	64,302	8.35
33	Sivaganga	55.86	E. M. S. Natchiappan	INC	246,078	40.23	H. Raja	BJP	222,267	36.34	23,811	3.89
34	Ramanathapuram	57.49	K. Malaisamy	ADMK	265,253	42.15	M. S. K. Bhavani	DMK	258,607	41.09	6,646	1.06
35	Sivakasi	62.86	Vaiko	MDMK	325,829	41.80	V. Ramaswami	ADMK	251,048	32.21	74,781	9.59
36	Tirunelveli	54.46	P. H. Pandian	ADMK	249,975	41.62	P. Geetha Jeevan	DMK	223,481	37.21	26,494	4.41
37	Tenkasi (SC)	64.87	S. Murugesan	ADMK	239,241	35.88	S. Arumugam	BJP	238,354	35.74	887	0.14
38	Tiruchendur	52.35	A. D. K. Jayaseelan,	DMK	237,630	44.41	Dr. B. P. Rajan	ADMK	177,964	33.26	59,666	11.15
39	Nagercoil	58.79	Pon Radhakrishnan	BJP	307,319	50.21	N. Dennis	INC	161,676	26.41	145,643	23.80

== Post-election Union Council of Ministers from Tamil Nadu ==
Source: The Tribune

=== Cabinet Ministers ===
Minister	Party	Lok Sabha Constituency/Rajya Sabha	Portfolios
Rangarajan Kumaramangalam	BJP	Tiruchirappalli	Minister of Power and Minister of Parliamentary Affairs
Murasoli Maran	DMK	Chennai Central	Minister of Commerce and Industry
T.R. Baalu	DMK	Chennai South	Minister of Environment and Forests

=== Ministers of State (Independent charge) ===
Minister	Party	Lok Sabha Constituency/Rajya Sabha	Portfolios
M. Kannappan	MDMK	Tiruchengode	Minister of Petroleum, Natural Gas, and Non-Conventional Energy Sources
N. T. Shanmugam	PMK	Vellore	Minister of Health and Family Welfare

=== Ministers of State ===
Minister	Party	Lok Sabha Constituency/Rajya Sabha	Portfolios
A. Raja	DMK	Perambalur	Minister of Rural Development
N. Ramachandran Gingee	MDMK	Tindivanam	Minister of Finance
E. Ponnuswamy	PMK	Chidambaram	Minister of Petroleum and Natural Gas

== Strike Rate ==
Strike rate is determined by calculating the number of seats won by a party of the number of seats it contested.

Alliance/ Party		Seats contested	Seats Won	Strike Rate
NDA	DMK	19	12	63.15%
NDA	PMK	7	5	71.42%
NDA	BJP	6	4	66.66%
NDA	MDMK	5	4	80.00%
NDA	MADMK	1	1	100%
NDA	TRC	1	0	0.00%
NDA	Total	39	26	66.66%
INC+	AIADMK	24	10	41.66%
INC+	INC	11	2	18.18%
INC+	CPI(M)	2	1	50.00%
INC+	CPI	2	0	0.00%
INC+	Total	39	13	33.33%

== Assembly Segment wise lead ==
Party	Assembly segments	Position in Assembly (as of 2001 election)
Dravida Munnetra Kazhagam	74	31
All India Anna Dravida Munnetra Kazhagam	62	132
Pattali Makkal Katchi	25	20
Bharatiya Janata Party	25	4
Marumalarchi Dravida Munnetra Kazhagam	18	0
Indian National Congress	15	7
MGR Anna Dravida Munnetra Kazhagam	5	2
Communist Party of India (Marxist)	4	6
Communist Party of India	3	5
Tamizhaga Rajiv Congress	2	did not contest
Puthiya Tamilagam	1	0
Others	0	27
Total	234	

== Bypolls (1999-2004) ==
District	Constituency		Winner				Runner up				Margin
District	No.	Name	Candidate	Party	Votes	%	Candidate	Party	Votes	%	Margin
Tiruchirappalli		Tiruchirappalli	Dalit Ezhilmalai	AIADMK	343,874	48.38	M. N. Sukumaran Nambiyar	BJP	3,26,461	45.93	17,413
Tiruchirappalli		Tiruchirappalli	Bypoll held on 10 May 2001 following the death of the incumbent member Rangarajan Kumaramangalam from Bharatiya Janata Party on 23 August 2000.								

== See also ==
- Elections in Tamil Nadu
