= K. C. Palanisamy =

Indian politician

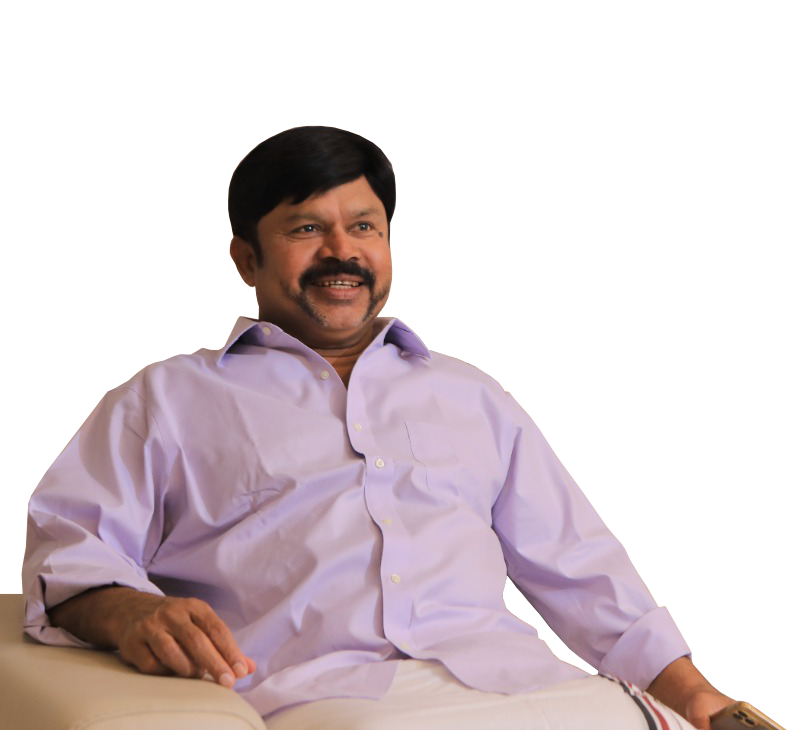

Member of Parliament, Lok Sabha
- In office 1989–1991
- Preceded by: P. Kannan
- Succeeded by: K. S. Soundaram
- Constituency: Tiruchengode

Member of the Tamil Nadu Legislative Assembly
- In office 1984–1989
- Preceded by: K. G. Krishnasamy
- Succeeded by: P. Marappan
- Constituency: Kangayam

Personal details
- Born: 20 February 1959 (age 67) Chennimalai, Coimbatore, Madras State, India (present-day Erode, Tamil Nadu)
- Party: All India Anna Dravida Munnetra Kazhagam (1972–2019)
- Spouse: Late Soundari
- Children: 2 (Karthik & Surender)
- Education: BE (Agri. Engineering)
- As of 22 September, 2006

K. C. Palanisamy is an Indian politician, former Member of Parliament and Member of the Tamil Nadu Legislative Assembly. A former member of All India Anna Dravida Munnetra Kazhagam, he served the Dravidian party founded by former Chief Minister of Tamil Nadu, M. G. Ramachandran on 17 October 1972. He was born and raised in Chennimalai, Erode District of Tamil Nadu. At the age of 9, K. C. Palanisamy met MGR and got influenced by the mission and vision of AIADMK. His political career began aged 13. In 1972, he joined AIADMK as a party member. K. C. Palanisamy was handpicked by former CM of Tamil Nadu, MGR as Deputy District Secretary of AIADMK's Youth Wing in 1982, at the age of 23. In 1984, he was elected as the party's youngest Member of Legislative Assembly for Kangeyam constituency in then Erode district (now in Thiruppur District). In 1989, K. C. Palanisamy chosen to contest in election as Member of Parliament by Jayalalitha and won with the second highest vote difference Nationally and highest difference in the State.

== Biography ==
K. C. Palanisamy was handpicked by both MGR and J. Jayalalitha to strengthen and guide AIADMK. After the demise Jayalalitha in 2016, K. C. Palanisamy opposed V. K. Sasikala being appointed as AIADMK's General Secretary, stating that General Secretary should be elected by cadres. A staunch believer of Annaism and follower of MGR and Jayalalitha's political ideology.

== Early life and education ==
In his early school days K. C. Palanisamy got motivated and inspired by MGR's mission and vision. At his age of 9years, he met MGR during the bi-election campaign for Perundurai constituency. This was the point where K. C. Palanisamy realized that he has to follow the path of MGR and had the ability to formulate opinions and views about society.

Positions Held
Deputy District Secretary, Youth Wing – Coimbatore Urban District	1982–?
MLA – Kangeyam	1984–1988
MP – Tiruchengode	1989–1991

== Electoral performance ==
Election	Constituency	Political party	Result	Vote %	Opposition			Ref
Election	Constituency	Political party	Result	Vote %	Candidate	Political party	Vote %	Ref
1984	Kangayam	AIADMK	Won	57.78%	M. Sivasabapathy	DMK	39.94%	
