= B. Senguttuvan =

Indian politician (1956–2021)

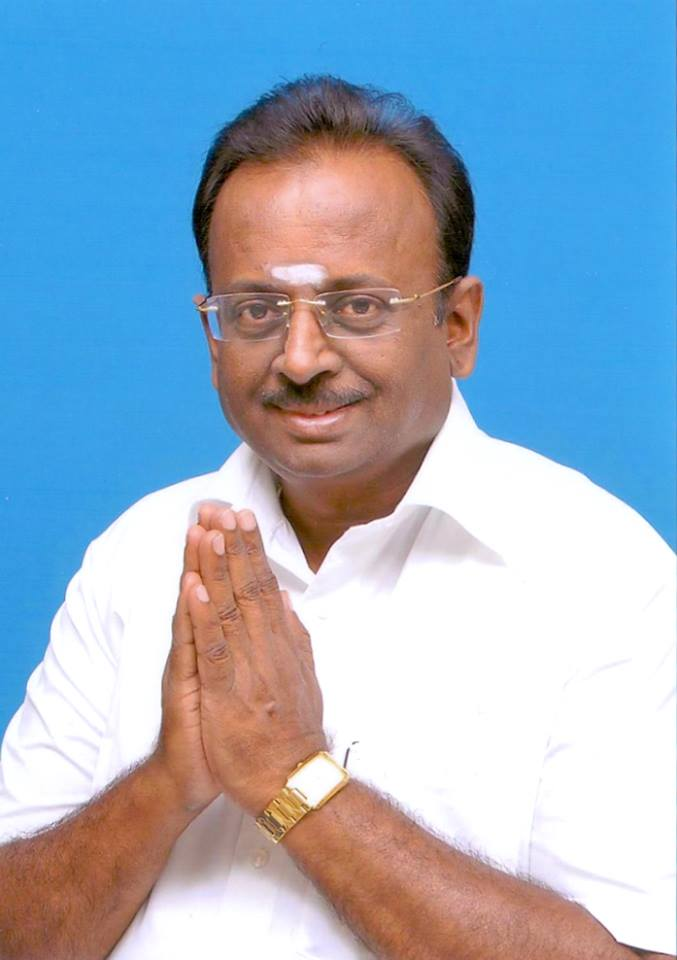

Member of Parliament, Lok Sabha
- In office 1 September 2014 – 23 May 2019
- Preceded by: Abdul Rahman (Vellore politician)
- Succeeded by: Kathir Anand
- Constituency: Vellore

Personal details
- Born: 21 May 1956
- Died: 19 August 2021 (aged 65)
- Party: All India Anna Dravida Munnetra Kazhagam

B. Senguttuvan (21 May 1956 – 19 August 2021) was an Indian politician and Member of Parliament elected from Tamil Nadu. He was elected to the 16th Lok Sabha from Vellore constituency as an Anna Dravida Munnetra Kazhagam (ADMK) candidate in 2014 election, defeating A. C. Shanmugam by a margin of 59,393 votes, to become the second ADMK candidate to win from the Vellore constituency after a gap of 30 years. He was an advocate, who enrolled himself as a lawyer in 1983. He served as Vellore district's Government Pleader from 2001 to 2006 and as the Public Prosecutor from 2011 to 2014, until he resigned the post to contest the 2014 general election. Both these periods were those of ADMK's regime in Tamil Nadu.

He has been a member of the ADMK from his student days at the Madras Law College in 1980, and as of 2014 he was the joint secretary of the AIADMK advocates’ wing in the district. He has authored books on the Code of Civil Procedure, Dishonouring of Cheques, Industrial Disputes Act and Sexual Offences Against Women and Children. He was born in Sengunthar Kaikola Mudaliyar family.

Senguttuvan died in 2021.
