= P. Shanmugam (Tamil Nadu politician, born 1946) =

Indian politician

Member of Parliament (Lok Sabha) for Vellore

Personal details
- Born: 10 October 1946 Agaramcheri Vill. in Vellore district, (Tamil Nadu)
- Died: 14 February 2006 (aged 59) Agaramcheri
- Party: Dravida Munnetra Kazhagam
- Spouse: Smt. S. Prema
- Profession: Politician

P. Shanmugam (10 October 1946 – 14 February 2006) (born to Shri S Panchatcharam Mudaliyar - Kamala Ammal) was the Member of Parliament for Vellore constituency (Lok Sabha). He has served during the period of 1996. He was also a social worker, businessman and agriculturist.

During the Lok Sabha election held during the year 1996, he defeated his opponent B. Akber Pasha by 211035 votes.

After that he became the district head for DMK for Vellore District. He also played a major role in the DMK.

He was President for

(i) 'Mat Weavers' Cooperative Society, Agaramcheri, 1997 onwards; and

(ii) Ambur Marketing Society, Ambur, 1997 onwards.

Preceded by B. Akber Pasha	Member of Indian Parliament (Lok Sabha) for Vellore; 1996 - 1998	Succeeded by N. T. Shanmugam
