= Muthukrishnan =

Muthukrishnan is a surname. Notable people with the surname include:

- M. Muthukrishnan, Indian politician
- S. Muthukrishnan, Indian politician
- S. Muthukrishnan (computer scientist), computer scientist of Indian origin
- Sathish Muthukrishnan, Indian actor and comedian
