= A. Senapathi Gounder =

Indian politician (1916–1992)

Member of the Madras Legislative Assembly
- In office 1952–1962
- Chief Minister: C. Rajagopalachari; K. Kamaraj
- Preceded by: Constituency established
- Succeeded by: Parvathi Anjuman
- Constituency: Dharapuram
- In office 1962–1967
- Chief Minister: K. Kamaraj; M. Bhakthavatsalam
- Preceded by: Karuthappa Gounder
- Succeeded by: N. Gounder
- Constituency: Oddanchatram
- In office 1967–1971
- Chief Minister: C. N. Annadurai; M. Karunanidhi
- Preceded by: K. S. Nataraja Gounder
- Succeeded by: Kovai Chezhiyan
- Constituency: Kangayam

Member of Parliament
- In office 1980–1992
- Prime Minister: Indira Gandhi; Rajiv Gandhi; V. P. Singh; Chandra Shekhar; P. V. Narasimha Rao
- Preceded by: C. Subramaniam
- Succeeded by: P. Kumarasamy
- Constituency: Palani

Personal details
- Born: 9 September 1916
- Died: 25 February 1992 (aged 75)
- Party: Indian National Congress
- Other political affiliations: Indian National Congress (I) (Note: In 1980 election); Independent (Note: In 1952 election)

A. Senapathi Gounder (Note: also spelt A. Sanapathi Gounder, A. Senapathy Gounder) (9 September 1916 – 25 February 1992) was an Indian politician, former Member of Parliament and Member of the Legislative Assembly of Madras.

He was elected to the Lok Sabha for four consecutive terms from Palani Lok Sabha constituency as the Indian National Congress candidate in 1980, 1984, 1989 and 1991 general elections, his last term ending with his death. He was also elected to the Madras Legislative Assembly from Dharapuram constituency in 1952 and 1957, and from Oddanchatram constituency in 1962, and from Kangayam constituency in 1967.
