= M. Durai =

Indian politician

M. Durai is an Indian politician and former Member of Parliament elected from Tamil Nadu. He was elected to the Lok Sabha from Vandavasi constituency as a Pattali Makkal Katchi candidate in 1998 and 1999 elections.

== Positions Held ==
- 1998-Elected to 12th Lok Sabha
- 1998-99-Member, Committee on Communications and its Sub- Committee-A on Department of Telecom
- Member, Consultative Committee, Ministry of Communications
- 1999-Re-elected to 13th Lok Sabha (2nd term)
- 1999-2000-Member, Committee on Energy
- 2000-2004-Member, Consultative Committee, Ministry of Chemicals and Fertilizers
