= Kathir Anand =

Indian politician

Member of Parliament, Lok Sabha
- Incumbent
- Assumed office 9 August 2019
- Preceded by: B. Senguttuvan
- Constituency: Vellore, Tamil Nadu

Personal details
- Born: January 19, 1975 (age 51) Vellore, Tamil Nadu
- Party: Dravida Munnetra Kazhagam
- Spouse: Sangeetha Kathiranand
- Children: Senthamarai, Ilakkiya, Ilavarasaan
- Parent(s): Durai Murugan, Santhakumari Duraimurugan

Dr.Durai Murugan Kathir Anand (born 19 January 1975) is an Indian politician and Member of Parliament, elected from Tamil Nadu. He is the son of the DMK General Secretary and former Minister for Water Resources in the Government of Tamil Nadu, Durai Murugan.

== Elections ==
Kathir Anand has been elected as an MP in the 17th Lok Sabha, from the Vellore constituency. This was his first direct electoral performance.

=== Lok Sabha Election ===
Year	Election	Party	Constituency	Result	Votes gained	Vote %
2019	17th Lok Sabha election	Dravida Munnetra Kazhagam	Vellore	Won	485,340	47.3%
2024	18th Lok Sabha election	Dravida Munnetra Kazhagam	Vellore	Won	5,68,692	50.35%

== Position Held ==
Start Date	End Date / Status	Position Held
01-Oct-2025	Ongoing	Member, The Select Committee on the Insolvency and Bankruptcy Code (Amendment) Bill, 2025
26-Sep-2024	Ongoing	Member, Committee on Commerce
June 2024	—	Elected to 18th Lok Sabha
—	—	Member, Consultative Committee, Ministry of Human Resource Development
13-Sept-2020	Ongoing	Member, Standing Committee on Education, Women, Children, Youth and Sport
13-Sept-2019	12-Sept-2020	Member, Standing Committee on Commerce
August 2019	—	Elected to 17th Lok Sabha
