= R. Jeevarathinam =

Indian politician

R. Jeevarathinam was an Indian politician and former Member of Parliament elected from Tamil Nadu. He was elected to the Lok Sabha from Arakkonam constituency as an Indian National Congress candidate in the 1984, 1989 and 1991 elections.
