= R. P. Ulaganambi =

Indian lawyer and politician (1938–2020)

Member of Parliament, Lok Sabha
- In office 1971–1977
- Preceded by: Kuchelar
- Succeeded by: V. Dhandayuthapani
- Constituency: Vellore

Personal details
- Born: 10 June 1938
- Died: 7 January 2020 (aged 81)

R. P. Ulaganambi (10 June 1938 – 7 January 2020) was an Indian lawyer and politician from Tamil Nadu. He was a member of the Lok Sabha.

== Biography ==
Ulaganambi was born on 10 June 1938 in Ranipet. He studied in Don Bosco High School, Pachaiyappa's College, Presidency College and Madras Law College. He was elected as a member of the Lok Sabha as a Dravida Munnetra Kazhagam candidate from Vellore in 1971. Later, he quit the party and joined Indian National Congress after a disagreement with the party high command.

Ulaganambi died on 7 January 2020 at the age of 81.
