= A. K. A. Abdul Samad =

Tamil politician, journalist, editor, author, educationist and businessman

A.K.A. Abdul Samad
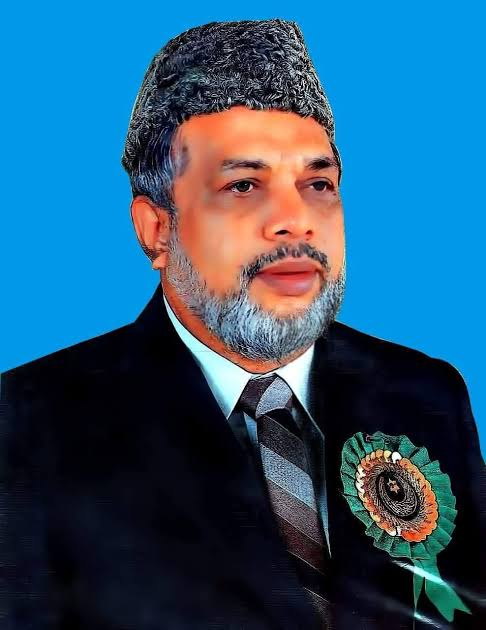
- Siraj-ul-Millat Abdul Samad Sahib

Member of Parliament Lok Sabha
- In office 2 December 1989 – 21 June 1991
- Preceded by: A. C. Shanmugam
- Succeeded by: B. Akbar Baasha
- Constituency: Vellore
- In office 18 January 1980 – 31 December 1984
- Preceded by: V. Dhandayuthapani
- Succeeded by: A. C. Shanmugam
- Constituency: Vellore

Member of the Tamil Nadu Legislative Assembly
- In office 31 December 1984 – 30 January 1988
- Preceded by: K. S. G. Haja Shareef
- Succeeded by: K. Nanjil Manoharan
- Constituency: Triplicane

Member of Parliament, Rajya Sabha
- In office 1964–1976
- Constituency: Tamil Nadu

Personal details
- Born: 4 October 1926 Karaikal, Pondicherry, French India
- Died: 11 April 1999 (aged 72) Chennai, Tamil Nadu, India
- Party: Indian Union Muslim League
- Spouse: Nargis Banu
- Children: 3 sons; 2 daughters
- Occupation: Indian parliamentarian; Muslim leader

A.K. Abdul Hameed Abdul Samad (4 October 1926 – 4 November 1999) was a prominent Tamil politician, and an important leader of the Indian Union Muslim League. He was also a journalist, editor, author, educationist and businessman. He is popularly known in his native states of Tamil Nadu and Kerala by the title "Siraj-ul-Millat" (Light of the Nation).

== Early life ==
Abdul samad was born on 4 October 1926 at Karaikal, Pondicherry French India. His father was an Indian freedom fighter and great scholar Allama A.K. Abdul hameed Baqavi and he was the first person to translate the Quran into Tamil language.

== Association with political parties ==
- All India General Secretary, Indian Union Muslim League
- State President (Tamil Nadu), Indian Union Muslim League

== Political career ==
- MP, Ninth Lok Sabha, 1989–91 (affiliated with Indian National Congress, serving Vellore, TN)
- MP, Seventh Lok Sabha, 1980–84 (Independent, serving Vellore, TN)
- MLA, Legislative Assembly, Tamil Nadu, 1984–88 (affiliated with Dravida Munnetra Kazhagam serving Triplicane, Chennai)
- MP, Rajya Sabha, 1964–76

== Government experience ==
- Member, Public Accounts Committee, Tamil Nadu Legislative Assembly, 1985–86
- Member, Public Accounts Committee, Rajya Sabha
- Member, Committee on Absence of Members from the Sittings of the House and Committee on Petitions, 7th Lok Sabha
- Member, Consultative Committee, Ministry of Tourism and Civil Aviation, Rajya Sabha
- Member, Committee on the Welfare of Scheduled Castes and Scheduled Tribes, Rajya Sabha
- Member, Consultative Committee, Ministry of Industry, 1990

== Delegation to foreign countries ==
- Member, IPD to Yugoslavia, 1971
- Member, Govt. of India's Haj Delegation, 1971 and 1989

== Memberships ==
- Syndicate Member, Madras University
- Senate Member, Annamalai University
- Court Member, Aligarh Muslim University
- President, Muslim Educational Association of South India (MEASI)
- Chairman, Board of Islamic Studies, Madras University

== Publications ==
- Sweet Memories of Sacred Haj (Tamil)
- 'Narpaniyatri Nabi Mani' (Muhammad's Biography in Tamil)
- 'An Introduction to Holy Quran' (Tamil)
- Founder-Editor, Mani Chudar (Tamil Daily)
- Founder-Editor, Mani Vilakkur (Tamil Monthly)
- Publisher, Crescent (English Weekly)

== Social activities ==
- Amelioration of the down-trodden
- Communal harmony
- Spread of higher education amongst Muslim minorities
