= K. P. Ramalingam =

Indian politician

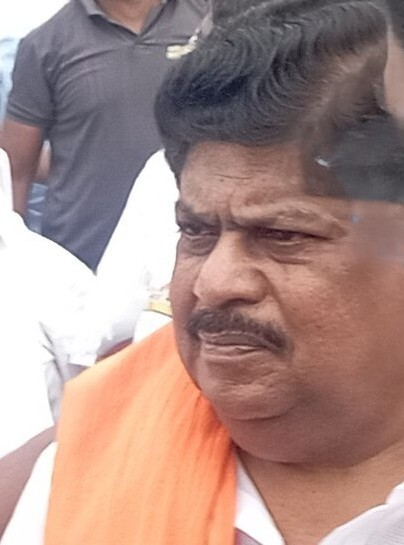

Member of Parliament, Rajya Sabha
- In office 30 June 2010 – 29 June 2016
- Preceded by: S. Krishnamoorthy
- Succeeded by: R. S. Bharathi
- Constituency: Tamil Nadu

Member of Parliament, Lok Sabha
- In office 10 May 1996 – 10 March 1998
- Preceded by: K. S. Soundaram
- Succeeded by: Edappadi K. Palaniswami
- Constituency: Tiruchengode

Member of Tamil Nadu Legislative Assembly
- In office 10 June 1980 – 27 January 1988
- Preceded by: P. Duraiswamy
- Succeeded by: A. Subbu
- Constituency: Rasipuram

Personal details
- Born: 2 June 1954 (age 72) Kalipatty, Salem District, Madras State
- Party: Bharatiya Janata Party
- Other political affiliations: Dravida Munnetra Kazhagam; All India Anna Dravida Munnetra Kazhagam
- Occupation: Politician

Dr. K. P. Ramalingam is an Indian politician and elected as member of parliament candidate in June, 2010 for Rajya Sabha. He is also a former Member of the Legislative Assembly of Tamil Nadu. He was elected to the Tamil Nadu legislative assembly as an Anna Dravida Munnetra Kazhagam candidate from Rasipuram constituency in 1980 and 1984 elections.

He was also Member of Parliament elected from Tamil Nadu. He was elected to the Lok Sabha from Tiruchengode constituency as a Dravida Munnetra Kazhagam candidate in 1996 election.
