= G. S. Lakshman Iyer =

Indian freedom activist

G. S. Lakshmanan Iyer
- Born: G. S. Lakshmanan; 1918; Gobichettipalayam, Tamil Nadu
- Died: 2011 (aged 92–93)
- Resting place: Gobichettipalayam, Tamil Nadu
- Known for: Indian independence movement, Social reform

G. S. Lakshmanan Iyer (1918 – 2 January 2011) was an Indian freedom fighter from Gobichettipalayam, Tamil Nadu, India. He was imprisoned for more than five years during India's freedom struggle. He has been credited with having done a lot toward the improvement of the poor and oppressed.

== Work ==
He donated most of his assets to improve the lives of poor people. He distributed his land worth hundreds of crores in today's money to build houses for the oppressed. He involved his wife in Satyagraha, who was also imprisoned along with him. Iyer was the chairman of Gobichettipalayam municipality twice [1952-1955 and 1986-1991]. It was during his regime that Gobichettipalayam became the first city in India to ban the Manual scavenging system. He freed Dalits from money debts, ensured that they lived in comfortable houses on clean, wide streets and built modern toilets.

== Recognition ==
A documentary film namely" Oyamari" also produced about life of Lakshmana Iyer by writer S. Balamurugan. https://m.youtube.com/watch?v=zkKljuB4fwg&feature=share In 2018 the Governor of Tamil Nadu unveiled a statue of G.S. Lakshman Iyer in the district.

== Death ==
He died in January 2011 due to illness at the age of 93 and thousands of people gathered to pay their last respects.
