= Abdul Rahman (Vellore politician) =

Indian politician

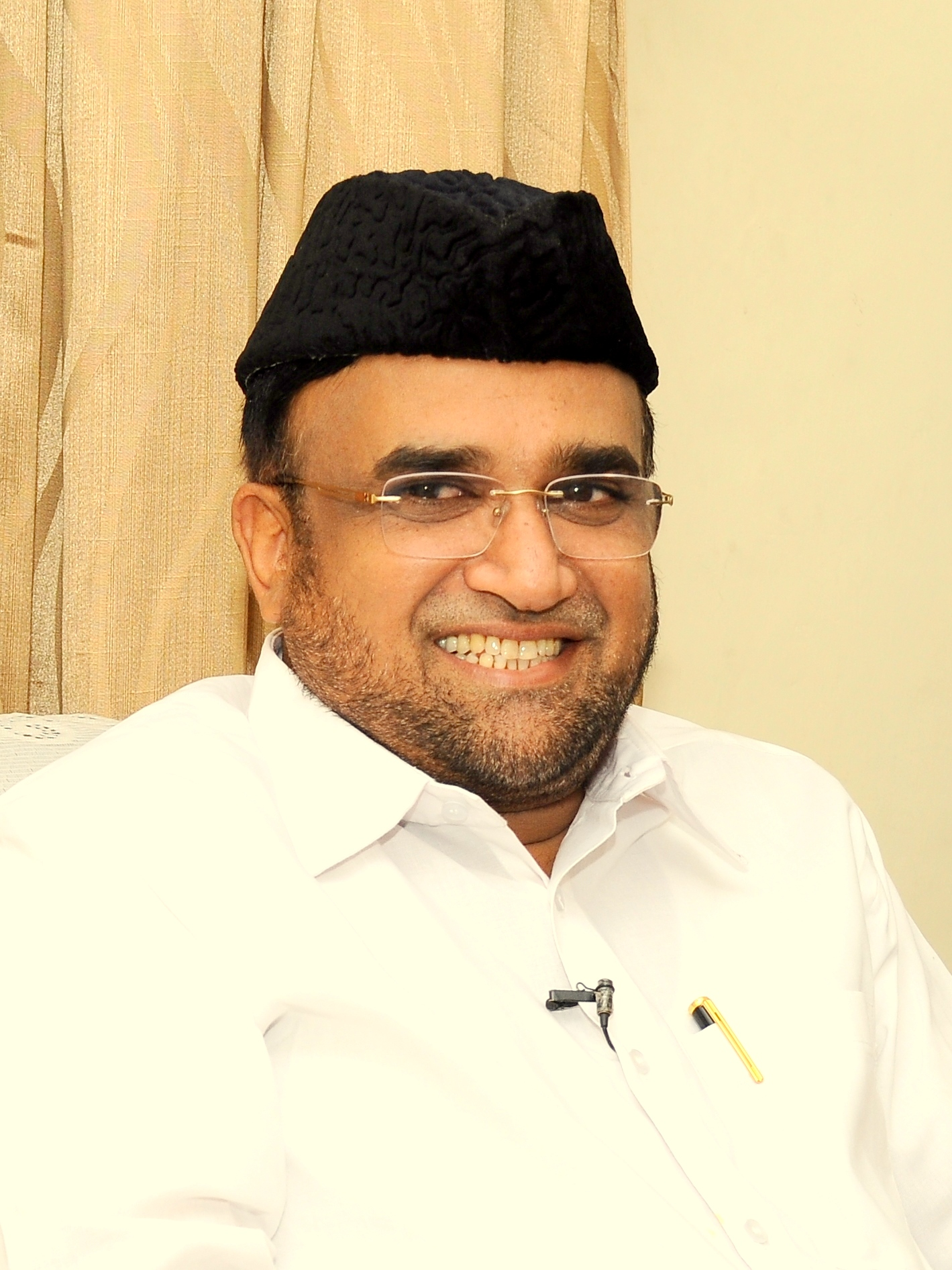

Member of the Indian Parliament (Lok Sabha)
- In office 16 May 2009 – 16 May 2014
- Constituency: Vellore

Chairman of Tamil Nadu Waqf Board
- In office 23 July 2021 – 13 September 2024
- Preceded by: A. Mohammed John
- Succeeded by: K. Navas Kani

Personal details
- Born: 28 May 1959 (age 67) Muthupet, Thanjavur district, Madras State (now Tiruvarur district, Tamil Nadu), India
- Party: Indian Union Muslim League
- Spouse: Ruhaiya Beevi
- Children: Son-2(Riaz Ahmed, Siddiq Ahmed), Daughter-1(Haleema).
- Education: School studies completed in Oriental Arabic High School, Akkur, specialised in Arabic Language. M.A. (Economics), Diploma in Computer Programming Educated at Jamal Mohamed College, Tiruchrappalli, Tamil Nadu and Institute of Business Applications, Chennai.
- Occupation: Diplomat, Politician

Abdul Rahman is an Indian politician, Former Chairman of Tamil Nadu Wakf Board and Former Member of the Parliament of India from Vellore Constituency, Tamil Nadu. He represents the Indian Union Muslim League party. IUML and DMK both are friendly parties in Tamil Nadu state, so he represented in DMK election symbol.

ADR and India Today combined survey has revealed Abdul Rahman placed in Sixth Rank among Top 20 MPs of the 15th Loksabha in all respects.

== Early life ==
Abdul Rahman was born in Muthupet, Tiruvarur, Tamil Nadu on 28 May 1959. Abdul Rahman is post graduate in Economics from Jamal Mohamed College, Tiruchrappalli. Prior to that he did Diploma in Computer Programming from Institute of Business Applications, Chennai.

== Special interests ==
According to the official portal of the Indian Government, the National Portal of India, Rahman describes his special interests as "Working for peace in society; inculcating ethical and spiritual values among the people and striving for communal harmony; spreading the study of comparative religion; to work for harmony of hearts and meeting of minds of our people in different cultures and to see India as the prosperous blissful land of peace".

== Posts held ==
#	From	To	Position
01	2001	2009	Member, Higher Level Political Affairs Committee, (I.U.M.L.), Tamil Nadu
02	2009	2014	Member of 15th Lok Sabha
03	2009	2014	Member, Committee on Information Technology
04	2009	2014	Member, Library Committee
05	2012	2014	Member, Tamil Nadu Wakf Board
06	2015	Present	Principal Vice-president, IUML-Tamil Nadu
07	2021	Sep 13,2024	Chairman, Tamil Nadu Wakf Board

== Other positions and awards ==
President, Quaide Millath Forum, Chennai; Vice-president, : (i) The Bank and (ii) Indian Muslim Association, U.A.E.; Founder Member of Indian Community Welfare Committee of Indian Consulate, Dubai; awarded, (i) "Outstanding Personality in Keeping Communal Harmony" award by Tamil Sangam; (ii) Personality award for communal amity conferred by Jamal Mohamed College, Tiruchirappalli, Tamil Nadu; (iii) first prize in State level elocution competition during school and college education
