= S. K. Kharventhan =

Former Indian Bar Council Chairman and Indian politician

S. K. Kharvendhan

Member of Parliament, Lok Sabha
- In office 16 May 2004 — 18 May 2009
- Constituency: Palani

Former Chairman of Indian Bar Council

Personal details
- Born: 10 May 1948 (age 77) Dharapuram, Tamil Nadu
- Party: INC and Bharatiya Janata Party
- Spouse: S.K. Venmathi
- Children: 3
- Profession: Lawyer and Politician
- As of 22 September, 2006

S.K. Karvendhan (born 10 May 1948) is an Indian politician and lawyer. He started his political career at the age of 18 in the year 1968. He was recognized and mentored by K. Kamaraj, Former Chief Minister of Madras State.

He was a member of the 11th Lok Sabha of India representing Tamilmannila Congress party in 1996-1998 and a member representing Indian National Congress Party in the 14th Lok Sabha 2004 to 2009. He represented the Palani constituency of Tamil Nadu when he was a member of the Indian National Congress (INC) political party, where he raised the most number of questions, summing up to 1177, and participated in the highest number of debates and discussions. He was one of the "top three performers in the 14th Lok Sabha (all 14 sessions combined)". He left INC and joined BJP. Now he is the head of BJP OBC Morcha Tamilnadu.
