= V. Dhandayuthapani =

Indian politician

Member of Lok Sabha from Tamil Nadu
- In office 1977–1980
- Preceded by: R. P. Ulaganambi
- Succeeded by: A. K. A. Abdul Samad
- Constituency: Vellore

Personal details
- Born: V. Dhandayuthapani; 28 November 1941 Alinjikuppam, North Arcot district
- Party: Janata Party
- Other political affiliations: Indian National Congress (Organisation)
- Spouse: Kamalaveni
- Occupation: social worker

V. Dhandayuthapani was an Indian politician . He was a Member of Parliament, representing Vellore in the Lok Sabha the lower house of Indian Parliament as a member of the Indian National Congress (Organisation) from 1977 to 1980.
