= S. Shanmugam =

Member of Tamil Nadu Legislative Assembly
- In office 13 May 2001 – 11 May 2006
- Preceded by: D. Sudarsanam
- Succeeded by: D. Sudarsanam
- Constituency: Poonamallee

Personal details
- Born: 19 April 1943 Kattuppakkam
- Party: Pattali Makkal Katchi
- Profession: Farmer

S. Shanmugam is an Indian politician and a former member of the Tamil Nadu Legislative Assembly. He is from Porur town in the Thiruvallur district. A member of the Pattali Makkal Katchi party, he successfully contested the 2001 Tamil Nadu Legislative Assembly election from the Poonamallee constituency and became a Member of the Legislative Assembly.

== Electoral performance ==
=== 2001 ===
2001 Tamil Nadu Legislative Assembly election: Poonamallee
Party	Candidate	Votes	%	±%
PMK	S. Shanmugam	62,220	37.51%	+29.97
DMK	S. Chezhiyan	59,904	36.12%	New
Puratchi Bharatham	M. Moorthy	21,194	12.78%	New
MDMK	R. Andhridoss	17,628	10.63%	−5.54
Independent	B. Ramaiah Naidu	2,146	1.29%	New
Independent	A. Ashokan	1,827	1.10%	New
Independent	C. N. A. Gouthaman	941	0.57%	New
Margin of victory		2,316	1.40%	−34.09%
Turnout		165,860	54.14%	−7.27%
Registered electors		306,344		
PMK gain from TMC(M)		Swing	-15.69%	
