= A. C. Shanmugam =

Indian politician

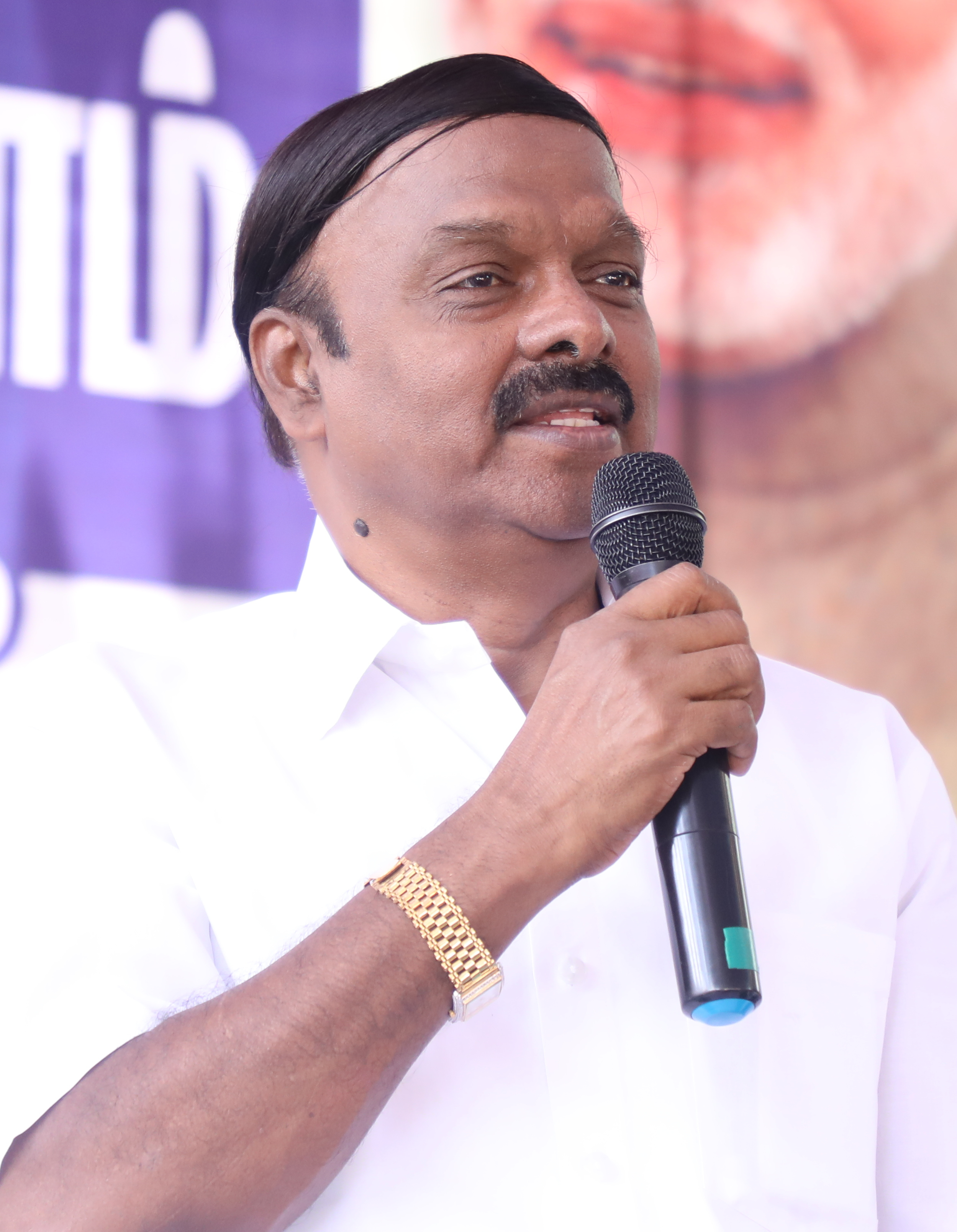
- A. C. Shanmugam delivering a speech

Member of Parliament, Lok Sabha
- In office 28 December 1984 – 28 November 1989
- Preceded by: A. K. A. Abdul Samad
- Succeeded by: A. K. A. Abdul Samad
- Constituency: Vellore

Personal details
- Born: 25 September 1950 (age 76) Arani, Tamil Nadu, India
- Party: Puthiya Needhi Katchi
- Children: 1
- Parent: Chockalingam (father)
- Occupation: Educationist, Politician
- Website: www.acshanmugam.com

Arani Chockalingam Shanmugam, better known as A. C. Shanmugam, is the founder and president of the Puthiya Needhi Katchi, a caste-based political party for the Thuluva Vellalar caste in Tamil Nadu, India. He was elected to the Lok Sabha from Vellore constituency as an AIADMK candidate in the 1984 election, Post that he lost in all the elections he contested. He usually allies' with losing alliance for his personal benefits and general people and even his caste people see him as lost politician.

== Political career ==
He began his political career as an All India Anna Dravida Munnetra Kazhagam (AIADMK) politician, when he won the 1984 parliament election with 52.93% of votes for AIADMK. Subsequently, he held the posts of MP and Member of the Legislative Assembly, before founding the New Justice Party.

In 2014, as a BJP candidate he contested elections in Vellore Lok Sabha constituency and lost. Later, he returned as candidate of AIADMK. and stood from the Vellore Lok Sabha constituency in 2019 on a AIADMK ticket, but narrowly lost by under a percentage point.

=== Puthiya Needhi Katchi ===
Puthiya Needhi Katchi (translation: New Justice Party), is a caste-based political party in Tamil Nadu founded by A.C. Shanmugam for the Mudaliar caste. The party was started just before the 2001 Tamil Nadu assembly election. The leader of the party claims to represent Mudaliars and Pillaimars castes significantly present from all over Tamil Nadu.

As of 2022, the party is still led by A. C. Shanmugam, and continues to ally with larger parties.

For the 2026 Assembly elections, it has tied up with AIADMK in the NDA alliance.

== Business ==
He is also the founder and chancellor of Dr. M.G.R. Educational and Research Institute, Rajarajeswari Group of Institutions, and ACS group of institutions in Arani.

== Electoral performance ==
=== General Elections of India ===
| Year | Constituency | Party | Votes | % | Opponent | Party | Votes | % | Result | Margin | % |
|---|---|---|---|---|---|---|---|---|---|---|---|
| 2024 | Vellore | BJP | 3,52,990 | 31.25 | Kathir Anand | DMK | 5,68,692 | 50.35 | Lost | -2,15,702 | -19.10 |
| 2019 | Vellore | ADMK | 4,77,199 | 46.42 | Kathir Anand | DMK | 4,85,340 | 47.21 | Lost | -8,141 | -0.79 |
| 2014 | Vellore | BJP | 3,24,326 | 33.26 | B. Senguttuvan | ADMK | 3,83,719 | 39.35 | Lost | -59,393 | -6.09 |
| 1984 | Vellore | ADMK | 2,84,416 | 52.93 | A. M. Ramalingam | DMK | 2,09,693 | 39.02 | Won | +74,723 | +13.91 |

== Filmography ==
=== As a producer ===
| Year | Film | Notes |
|---|---|---|
| 2021 | Aranmanai 3 | |
| 2022 | Coffee with Kadhal | |
| 2024 | Aranmanai 4 | |
| 2025 | Madha Gaja Raja | Filmed in 2012 and released after 12 years |
| 2025 | Gangers | |
| 2026 | Double Occupancy | |
| 2026 | Meesaya | |
| 2027 | Purushan | |
