= M. Muthukrishnan =

Indian politician

M. Muthukrishnan was an Indian politician and former Member of Parliament elected from Tamil Nadu. He was elected to the Lok Sabha from Vellore constituency as an Indian National Congress candidate in 1951 and 1957 elections.
