= P. Kannan =

Indian politician

P. Kannan (c. 1939 – 16 September 2016) was an Indian politician and former Member of Parliament elected from Tamil Nadu. He was elected to the Lok Sabha as an All India Anna Dravida Munnetra Kazhagam candidate from Salem constituency in 1977 election, and from Tiruchengode constituency in the 1984 election. He died at the age of 77 in 2016.
