= Palani Lok Sabha constituency =

Former constituency of the Indian parliament in Tamil Nadu

Coordinates: 10.45°N 77.52°E

Palani
- Former Lok Sabha constituency
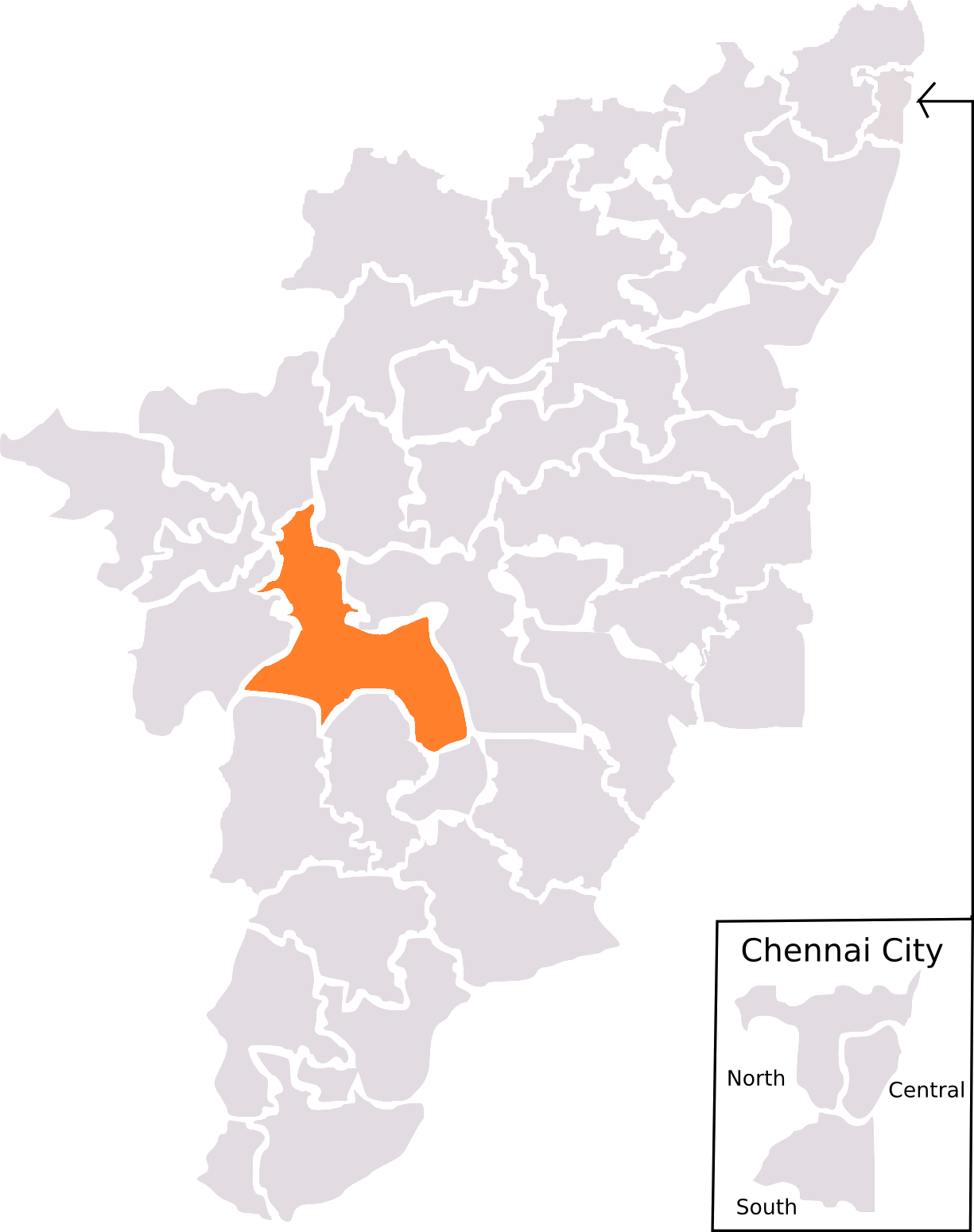

Constituency details
- Country: India
- Region: South India
- State: Tamil Nadu
- Assembly constituencies: Vellakoil; Kangayam; Palani; Oddanchatram; Natham; Vedasandur
- Established: 1977
- Abolished: 2008
- Reservation: None

Palani was a Lok Sabha constituency in Tamil Nadu. In 2009, after delimitation and redistricting exercise of 2008, Palani constituency was abolished and has become a part of Dindigul Lok Sabha constituency and Karur Lok Sabha constituency.

== Assembly segments ==
Palani Lok Sabha constituency is composed of the following assembly segments:

1. Vellakoil (Defunct)
2. Kangayam (Moved to Erode)
3. Palani (SC) (Moved to Dindigul)
4. Oddanchatram (Moved to Dindigul)
5. Natham (Moved to Dindigul)
6. Vedasandur (Moved to Dindigul)

== Members of the Parliament ==
Year	Duration	Winner	Party
Sixth	1977-80	C. Subramaniam	Indian National Congress
Seventh	1980-84	A. Senapathi Gounder	Indian National Congress
Eighth	1984-89	A. Senapathi Gounder	Indian National Congress
Ninth	1989-91	A. Senapathi Gounder	Indian National Congress
Ninth	1991-92	A. Senapathi Gounder	Indian National Congress
Tenth	1992-96	Palaniyappa Gounder Kumarasamy	All India Anna Dravida Munnetra Kazhagam
Eleventh	1996-98	S. K. Kharventhan	Tamil Maanila Congress
Twelfth	1998-99	A. Ganeshamurthi	Marumalarchi Dravida Munnetra Kazhagam
Thirteenth	1999-04	Palaniyappa Gounder Kumarasamy	All India Anna Dravida Munnetra Kazhagam
Fourteenth	2004- 2009	S. K. Kharventhan	Indian National Congress
Abolished

== Election results ==
Vote share of Winning candidates
2004	64.50%
1999	43.6%
1998	45.7%
1996	55.2%
1993	42.4%
1991	66.4%
1989	50.1%
1984	67.7%
1980	52.3%
1977	70.0%

=== General Elections 2004 ===
2004 Indian general election : Palani
Party	Candidate	Votes	%	±%
INC	S. K. Kharventhan	448,900	64.55%	
AIADMK	K. Kishore Kumar	2,17,407	31.26%	−13.52%
Independent	P. Jeyaprakash	11,337	1.63%	
BSP	T. Subramaniyam	5,554	0.80%	
Independent	S. Parameshvaran	3,524	0.51%	
Margin of victory		2,31,493	33.29%	28.97%
Turnout		6,95,442	63.86%	4.98%
Registered electors		10,88,931		−6.10%
INC gain from AIADMK		Swing	19.76%	

=== General Elections 1999 ===
1999 Indian general election : Palani
Party	Candidate	Votes	%	±%
AIADMK	P. Kumarasamy	297,850	44.78%	14.62%
MDMK	A. Ganeshamurthi	2,69,133	40.47%	31.20%
TMC(M)	S. K. Kharventhan	85,407	12.84%	
Independent	M. Dharamalingam	5,046	0.76%	
Independent	K. M. Natarajan	3,550	0.53%	
Margin of victory		28,717	4.32%	−0.19%
Turnout		6,65,079	58.88%	−10.01%
Registered electors		11,59,677		3.76%
AIADMK gain from TMC(M)		Swing	-12.65%	

=== General Elections 1998 ===
1998 Indian general election : Palani
Party	Candidate	Votes	%	±%
MDMK	A. Ganeshamurthi	286,300	47.08%	
TMC(M)	S. K. Kharventhan	2,58,863	42.57%	
INC	K. S. Venugopal	61,089	10.05%	
Margin of victory		27,437	4.51%	−22.75%
Turnout		6,08,050	56.07%	−12.82%
Registered electors		11,17,611		4.65%
MDMK gain from TMC(M)		Swing	-10.35%	

=== General Elections 1996 ===
1996 Indian general election : Palani
Party	Candidate	Votes	%	±%
TMC(M)	S. K. Kharventhan	405,782	57.43%	
AIADMK	Palaniyappa Gounder Kumarasamy	2,13,149	30.17%	
MDMK	Ponniyin selvan	65,489	9.27%	
BJP	K. Thirumalaisamy	8,873	1.26%	
Margin of victory		1,92,633	27.26%	−13.10%
Turnout		7,06,553	68.89%	3.74%
Registered electors		10,67,963		3.61%
TMC(M) gain from INC		Swing	-11.75%	

=== General Elections 1991 ===
1991 Indian general election : Palani
Party	Candidate	Votes	%	±%
INC	A. Senapathi Gounder	445,897	69.18%	18.50%
DMK	K. Kumarsamy	1,85,755	28.82%	−8.92%
THMM	V. Nageswaran	3,362	0.52%	
Independent	P. Naguvel	3,351	0.52%	
Margin of victory		2,60,142	40.36%	27.42%
Turnout		6,44,505	65.16%	3.99%
Registered electors		10,30,799		−0.31%
INC hold		Swing	18.50%	

=== General Elections 1989 ===
1989 Indian general election : Palani
Party	Candidate	Votes	%	±%
INC	A. Senapathi Gounder	316,938	50.68%	−20.58%
DMK	Rajkumar Mandradiar	2,36,025	37.74%	
Independent	Usha Rajandhar	38,275	6.12%	
Independent	A. Senapathi Gounder	4,729	0.76%	
Margin of victory		80,913	12.94%	−33.16%
Turnout		6,25,332	61.17%	−13.25%
Registered electors		10,33,981		27.65%
INC hold		Swing	-20.58%	

=== General Elections 1984 ===
1984 Indian general election : Palani
Party	Candidate	Votes	%	±%
INC	A. Senapathi Gounder	408,104	71.26%	
TNC(K)	S. R. Velusamy	1,44,076	25.16%	
Independent	M. Arumugam	10,649	1.86%	
Independent	V. S. Mariappa Gounder	9,864	1.72%	
Margin of victory		2,64,028	46.10%	32.31%
Turnout		5,72,693	74.42%	16.62%
Registered electors		8,10,013		6.22%
INC gain from INC(I)		Swing	17.85%	

=== General Elections 1980 ===
1980 Indian general election : Palani
Party	Candidate	Votes	%	±%
INC(I)	A. Senapathi Gounder	230,733	53.41%	
JP	P. S. K. Lakshimipathyraju	1,71,165	39.62%	
Independent	S. K. Kharventhan	21,925	5.08%	
Independent	V. S. Chandirakumar	6,067	1.40%	
Independent	K. K. Appan	2,107	0.49%	
Margin of victory		59,568	13.79%	−31.40%
Turnout		4,31,997	57.80%	−10.36%
Registered electors		7,62,601		3.33%
INC(I) gain from INC		Swing	-18.29%	

=== General Elections 1977 ===
1977 Indian general election : Palani
Party	Candidate	Votes	%	±%
INC	Chidambaram Subramaniam	351,897	71.70%	
DMK	K. N. Saminathan	1,30,129	26.51%	
Independent	K. N. Lingaswamy Gounder	8,778	1.79%	
Margin of victory		2,21,768	45.18%	
Turnout		4,90,804	68.16%	
Registered electors		7,38,018		
INC win (new seat)				

== See also ==
- Palani
- List of constituencies of the Lok Sabha
