= P. Kumarasamy =

Indian politician

Palaniappa Gounder Kumarasamy is an Indian politician and former Member of Parliament elected from Tamil Nadu. He was elected to the Lok Sabha from erstwhile Palani constituency as an Anna Dravida Munnetra Kazhagam candidate in 1992 by-election and 1999 election.
