= Vellore Lok Sabha constituency =

Parliamentary constituency in Tamil Nadu, India

Coordinates: 12.920219°N 79.133306°E

Vellore
- Lok Sabha constituency
- Interactive map of Vellore Loksabha constituency, post-2008 delimitation

Constituency details
- Country: India
- Region: South India
- State: Tamil Nadu
- Assembly constituencies: Vellore; Anaikattu; Kilvaithinankuppam; Gudiyattam; Vaniyambadi; Ambur
- Established: 1951-present
- Total electors: 14,30,991

Member of Parliament
- 18th Lok Sabha
- Incumbent D. M. Kathir Anand
- Party: DMK
- Alliance: None
- Elected year: 2024

Vellore Lok Sabha constituency is one of the 39 Lok Sabha (parliamentary) constituencies in the present state of Tamil Nadu in Southern India. Its Tamil Nadu Parliamentary Constituency number is 8.

The 2019 lok sabha election was scheduled to be held on 18 April in this constituency but the President of India rescinded polling on 16 April after Election Commission of India sent a report stating recovery of huge amount of unaccounted for cash allegedly from Dravida Munnetra Kazhagam candidate's office.

== Assembly segments ==
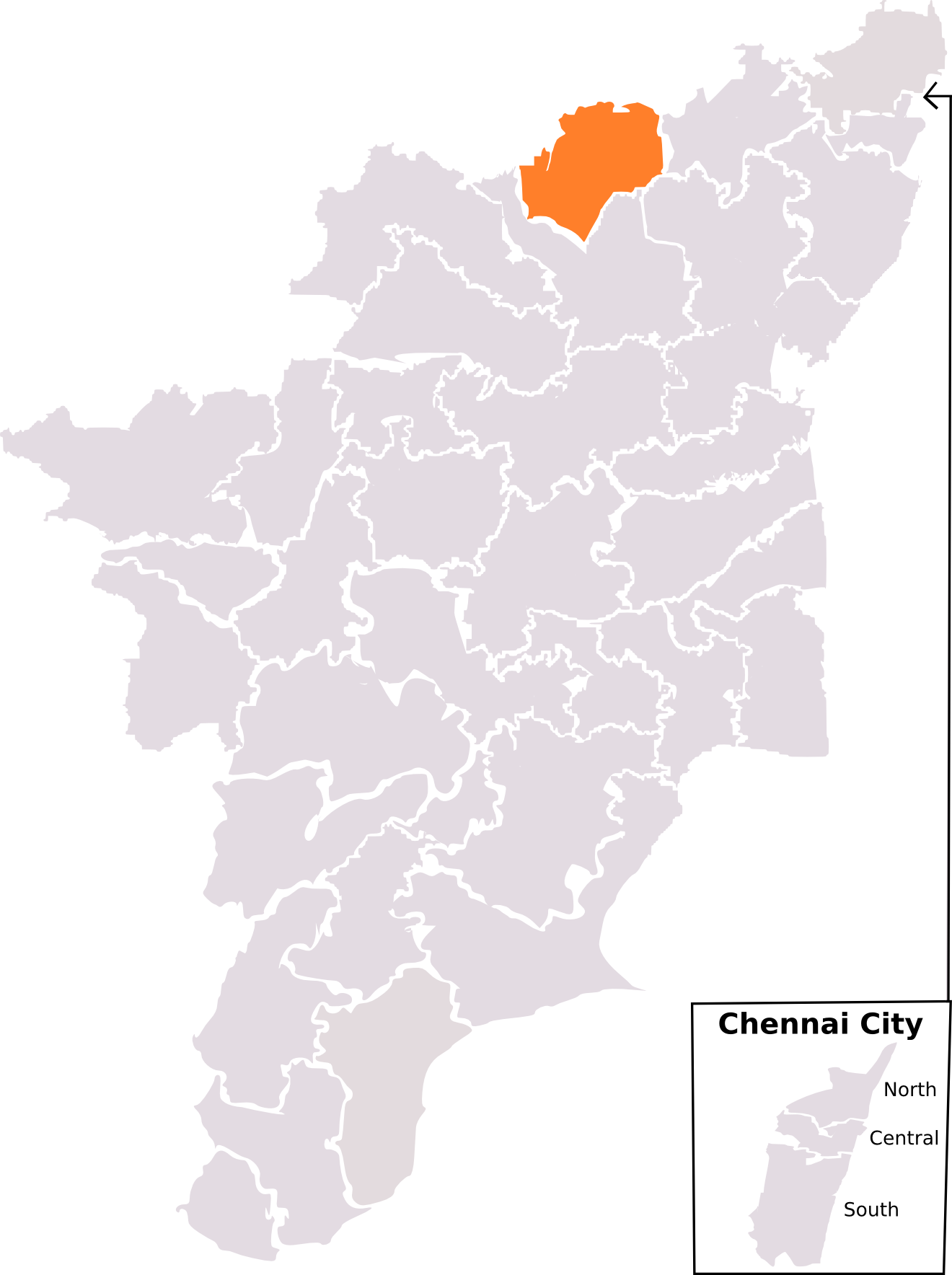
Vellore constituency as laid out by 2008 Delimitation

After delimitation and from 2009 Indian general election the constituency is composed of following legislative assembly segments:

Constituency number	Name	Reserved for (SC/ST/None)	District	Party	2024 Lead
43	Vellore	None	Vellore	TVK	DMK
44	Anaikattu	None	Vellore	AIADMK	DMK
45	Kilvaithinankuppam	SC	Vellore	TVK	DMK
46	Gudiyattam	SC	Vellore	TVK	DMK
47	Vaniyambadi	None	Tirupathur	IUML	DMK
48	Ambur	None	Tirupathur	DMK	DMK

Vellore Lok Sabha constituency was composed of the following legislative assembly (Vidhan Sabha) segments since 1951–52 Indian general election until delimitation in 2008:

1. Vellore
2. Katpadi (moved to Arakkonam)
3. Gudiyatham
4. Pernambut (SC) (defunct)
5. Anaicut
6. Arni (moved to Arani)

== Constituency Summery ==
Election	Electors		Voters		Polling Percentage	Change
Election	Total	Changes	Total	Change	Polling Percentage	Change
2009	1010067	-210387 ▼	724150	-23748 ▼	71.69%	10.41% ▲
2014	1312259	302192 ▼	975203	251053 ▲	74.31%	2.62% ▲
2019	1946870	634611 ▲	1408189	432986 ▲	72.33%	-1.98% ▼

== Members of Parliament ==
Year	Winner	Party
1951	M. Muthukrishnan	Indian National Congress
1951	Ramachander	Commonweal Party
1957	N. R. Muniswamy	Indian National Congress
1957	M. Muthukrishnan	Indian National Congress
1962	T Abdul Wahid	Indian National Congress
1967	Kuchelar	Dravida Munnetra Kazhagam
1971	R. P. Ulaganambi	Dravida Munnetra Kazhagam
1977	V. Dhandayuthapani	Indian National Congress (O)
1980	A. K. A. Abdul Samad	Independent
1984	A. C. Shanmugam	All India Anna Dravida Munnetra Kazhagam
1989	A. K. A. Abdul Samad	Indian National Congress
1991	B. Akber Pasha	Indian National Congress
1996	P. Shanmugam	Dravida Munnetra Kazhagam
1998	N. T. Shanmugam	Pattali Makkal Katchi
1999	N. T. Shanmugam	Pattali Makkal Katchi
2004	K. M. Kader Mohideen	Dravida Munnetra Kazhagam
2009	Abdul Rahman	Dravida Munnetra Kazhagam
2014	B. Senguttuvan	All India Anna Dravida Munnetra Kazhagam
2019	D. M. Kathir Anand	Dravida Munnetra Kazhagam
2024	D. M. Kathir Anand	Dravida Munnetra Kazhagam

== Election results ==
Vote share of Winning candidates
2024	50.35%
2019	47.35%
2014	39.65%
2009	49.84%
2004	58.46%
1999	47.08%
1998	49.12%
1996	57.52%
1991	61.70%
1989	54.20%
1984	52.93%
1980	55.11%
1977	49.22%
1971	57.13%
1967	55.83%
1962	41.03%
1957	19.24%
1951	20.89%

=== General Elections 2024 ===
2024 Indian general election: Vellore
Party	Candidate	Votes	%	±%
DMK	Kathir Anand	568,692	50.35	▲3.14
BJP	A. C. Shanmugam	352,990	31.25	
AIADMK	S. Pasupati	117,682	10.42	▼36.00
NOTA	None of the above	8,736	0.77	▼0.15
Margin of victory		215,702	19.08	▲18.29
Turnout		1,129,458	73.53	▲2.07
Registered electors		1,528,273		
DMK hold		Swing		

=== General Elections 2019 ===
2019 Indian general election: Vellore
Party	Candidate	Votes	%	±%
DMK	Kathir Anand	485,340	47.21	
AIADMK	A. C. Shanmugam	4,77,199	46.42	7.07
NOTA	Nota	9,417	0.92	0.19
Margin of victory		8,141	0.79	−5.30
Turnout		10,28,100	71.46	−2.85
Registered electors		14,38,643		
DMK gain from AIADMK		Swing	7.86	

=== General Elections 2014 ===
2014 Indian general election: Vellore
Party	Candidate	Votes	%	±%
AIADMK	B. Senguttuvan	383,719	39.35	4.36
BJP	A. C. Shanmugam	3,24,326	33.26	31.71
IUML	Abdul Rahman	2,05,896	21.11	
INC	J. Vijay Elanchezian	21,650	2.22	
NOTA	None Of The Above	7,100	0.73	
Independent	C. Gopu	6,056	0.62	
Margin of victory		59,393	6.09	−8.76
Turnout		9,75,203	74.31	2.71
Registered electors		13,12,259		
AIADMK gain from DMK		Swing	-10.49	

=== General Elections 2009 ===
2009 Indian general election: Vellore
Party	Candidate	Votes	%	±%
DMK	Abdul Rahman	360,474	49.84	−8.62
AIADMK	L. K. M. B. Vasu	2,53,081	34.99	0.45
DMDK	Shoukath Sherif	62,696	8.67	
BJP	A. K. Rajendiran	11,184	1.55	
Independent	C. Chandran	6,046	0.84	
Independent	D. Kubendiran	5,143	0.71	
Independent	C. Gopalakrishnan	4,822	0.67	
Margin of victory		1,07,393	14.85	−9.06
Turnout		10,10,067	71.61	10.41
Registered electors		7,23,262		
DMK hold		Swing	-8.62	

=== General Elections 2004 ===
2004 Indian general election: Vellore
Party	Candidate	Votes	%	±%
DMK	K. M. Kader Mohideen	436,642	58.46	
AIADMK	A. Santhanam	2,58,032	34.55	−8.81
JP	A. M. S. Paramasivam	11,309	1.51	
BSP	E. Karunanithi	7,524	1.01	
Independent	K. Venkatesan	5,590	0.75	
Independent	V. Balachandran	4,757	0.64	
Independent	M. K. Shariff	4,563	0.61	
RPI(A)	S. Arun Kumar	4,147	0.56	
Margin of victory		1,78,610	23.91	20.19
Turnout		7,46,914	61.20	0.23
Rejected ballots		513	0.07	
Registered electors		12,20,454		
DMK gain from PMK		Swing	11.38	

Note:Pattali Makkal Katchi did not contest this seat in 2004. Instead it was contested by its United Progressive Alliance (UPA) coalition partner Dravida Munnetra Kazhagam (DMK), who won the seat. Thus, the UPA held the seat. DMK had not contested this seat in the previous 1999 elections.

=== General Elections 1999 ===
1999 Indian general election: Vellore
Party	Candidate	Votes	%	±%
PMK	N. T. Shanmugam	324,547	47.08	
AIADMK	Mohamed Asif	2,98,862	43.35	
TMC(M)	C. K. Thamizharasan	44,551	6.46	
Independent	M. Thanikesan	15,158	2.20	
Independent	M. Kuppusamy	4,471	0.65	
Margin of victory		25,685	3.73	−0.19
Turnout		6,89,375	60.97	−2.01
Registered electors		11,52,421		
PMK hold		Swing	-2.04	

=== General Elections 1998 ===
1998 Indian general election: Vellore
Party	Candidate	Votes	%	±%
PMK	N. T. Shanmugam	331,035	49.12	
DMK	T. A. Mohammed Saqhy	3,04,630	45.20	15.57
INC	B. Akber Pasha	18,885	2.80	−58.90
Independent	M. Padmanabhan	17,837	2.65	
Margin of victory		26,405	3.92	−28.15
Turnout		6,73,929	62.98	−1.09
Registered electors		11,01,216		
PMK gain from INC		Swing	-12.58	

=== General Elections 1991 ===
1991 Indian general election: Vellore
Party	Candidate	Votes	%	±%
INC	B. Akber Pasha	383,177	61.70	7.50
DMK	P. Shanmugam	1,84,008	29.63	−0.12
IUML	Mohammed Ishaq	31,387	5.05	
JP	A. K. Sundararajan	6,354	1.02	
AMI	M. Dhanashekaran	3,321	0.53	
Independent	J. P. Ganeshan	2,901	0.47	
Margin of victory		1,99,169	32.07	7.63
Turnout		6,21,045	64.07	−2.13
Registered electors		10,07,812		
INC hold		Swing	7.50	

=== General Elections 1989 ===
1989 Indian general election: Vellore
Party	Candidate	Votes	%	±%
INC	A. K. A. Abdul Samad	356,637	54.20	
DMK	M. Abdul Lathief	1,95,787	29.75	−9.27
PMK	R. Mohan	85,312	12.96	
Independent	J. Veradan	8,184	1.24	
Margin of victory		1,60,850	24.44	10.54
Turnout		6,58,061	66.20	−8.77
Registered electors		10,11,139		
INC gain from AIADMK		Swing	1.27	

=== General Elections 1984 ===
1984 Indian general election: Vellore
Party	Candidate	Votes	%	±%
AIADMK	A. C. Shanmugam	284,416	52.93	
DMK	A. M. Ramalingam	2,09,693	39.02	
Independent	D. Gangappa	37,312	6.94	
Margin of victory		74,723	13.91	−4.95
Turnout		5,37,377	74.97	14.15
Registered electors		7,48,776		
AIADMK gain from Independent		Swing	-2.19	

=== General Elections 1980 ===
1980 Indian general election: Vellore
Party	Candidate	Votes	%	±%
Independent	A. K. A. Abdul Samad	232,567	55.11	
JP	V. Dhandayuthapani	1,53,021	36.26	
JP(S)	M. J. Tamilmani	16,007	3.79	
Independent	Chicha @ A. Loganatha Naidu	8,939	2.12	
Independent	V. S. Chandirakumar	5,339	1.27	
Independent	I. S. Seshan	4,120	0.98	
Independent	P. S. Ganesan	1,983	0.47	
Margin of victory		79,546	18.85	18.15
Turnout		4,21,976	60.82	−8.84
Registered electors		7,07,512		
Independent gain from INC		Swing	5.90	

=== General Elections 1977 ===
1977 Indian general election: Vellore
Party	Candidate	Votes	%	±%
INC(O)	V. Dhandayuthapani	220,994	49.22	14.09
Independent	A. K. A. Abdul Samad	2,17,833	48.51	
Independent	S. I. Seshan	6,464	1.44	
Independent	V. K. Damodaram	3,713	0.83	
Margin of victory		3,161	0.70	−21.30
Turnout		4,49,004	69.66	−1.91
Registered electors		6,59,939		
INC gain from DMK		Swing	-7.91	

=== General Elections 1971 ===
1971 Indian general election: Vellore
Party	Candidate	Votes	%	±%
DMK	R. P. Ulaganambi	221,512	57.13	1.30
INC(O)	T. Manavalan	1,36,191	35.12	−1.61
Independent	Gopal	30,039	7.75	
Margin of victory		85,321	22.00	2.91
Turnout		3,87,742	71.57	−3.66
Registered electors		5,59,646		
DMK hold		Swing	1.30	

=== General Elections 1967 ===
1967 Indian general election: Vellore
Party	Candidate	Votes	%	±%
DMK	Kuchelar	203,887	55.83	
INC	A. Jayaraman	1,34,155	36.74	−4.29
RPI(A)	M. Krishnasamy	27,143	7.43	
Margin of victory		69,732	19.09	10.53
Turnout		3,65,185	75.23	8.17
Registered electors		5,04,140		
DMK gain from INC		Swing	14.80	

=== General Elections 1962 ===
1962 Indian general election: Vellore
Party	Candidate	Votes	%	±%
INC	T Abdul Wahid	114,872	41.03	21.79
RPI	N. Sivaraj	90,906	32.47	
CPI	Rajarathinam	47,186	16.85	
Independent	T. R. Purushotama Reddiar	6,632	2.37	
Independent	Vilwanatha Mudaliar	5,721	2.04	
PSP	Ganesa Mudaliar	5,110	1.83	
Independent	G. M. Annalthango	4,871	1.74	
Independent	Mohamed Pasha	3,506	1.25	
Margin of victory		23,966	8.56	6.13
Turnout		2,79,968	67.06	−26.55
Registered electors		4,34,404		
INC hold		Swing	21.79	

=== General Elections 1957 ===
1957 Indian general election: Vellore
Party	Candidate	Votes	%	±%
INC	N. R. Munisamy	144,377	19.24	−1.65
INC	M. Muthukrishnan	126,132	16.81	−4.08
Independent	G. M. Annalthango	1,17,680	15.68	
Independent	J. P. Ganesha Mudaliar	1,02,619	13.68	
Independent	M. Krishnasami	89,311	11.90	
Independent	Sambanda Mudaliar	74,501	9.93	
Independent	A. Jayaraman	57,425	7.65	
Independent	V. R. Venkatesan	22,970	3.06	
Independent	R. T. S. Moorthy	15,350	2.05	
Margin of victory		18,245	2.43	−0.76
Turnout		7,50,365	93.61	2.35
Registered electors		8,01,572		
INC hold		Swing	-1.65	

=== General Elections 1951 ===
1951–52 Indian general election: Vellore
Party	Candidate	Votes	%	±%
INC	M. Muthukrishnan	139,448	20.89	20.89
Commonweal Party	Ramachander	118,154	17.70	
INC	N. S. Vardachari	1,17,474	17.60	17.60
Independent	Muhammed Anwar	1,17,234	17.56	
RPI	Krishnaswami	96,045	14.39	
KMPP	Murthy	50,085	7.50	
KMPP	Ambi Iyer	29,201	4.37	
Margin of victory		21,294	3.19	
Turnout		6,67,641	91.27	
Registered electors		7,31,534		
INC win (new seat)				

== See also ==
- Vellore City
- Election Commission of India
- List of constituencies of the Lok Sabha
