= K. S. Soundaram =

Indian politician, poet, and researcher

K. S. Soundaram (born 2 June 1946) is a poet, researcher and politician from the All India Anna Dravida Munnetra Kazhagam who represented Tiruchengode in the 10th Lok Sabha.

== Early life ==
Born on 2 June 1946 in Erode district, K. S. Soundaram attended the Seethalakshmi Ramaswami College, Tiruchirapalli; PSG College of Arts and Science and Bharathiar University. She holds M.A., M.Phil. and Ph.D. degrees. The topic of her thesis was Dramatic Aspects in Kalithogai.

== Career ==
Soundaram is known for her research work on Tamil literature. In 1972, she became a member of the All India Anna Dravida Munnetra Kazhagam (AIADMK) and cites M.G. Ramachandran and J. Jayalalithaa as her inspiration. She contested the 1991 Indian general election from Tiruchengode constituency on the ticket of AIADMK and obtained 5,21,580 votes while her nearest rival, K. P. Ramalingam of Dravida Munnetra Kazhagam received 2,07,099. The number of votes she polled was the highest one a candidate received and her victory margin of 3,14,481 votes was the highest one in South India for that general election.

== Personal life ==
Soundaram married Prof. R. Arumugam on 9 June 1969. Together they have two sons.
