= Tiruchengode Lok Sabha constituency =

Defunct parliament constituency in Tamil Nadu, India

Coordinates: 11.38°N 77.89°E

Tiruchengode
- Former Lok Sabha constituency

Constituency details
- Country: India
- Region: South India
- State: Tamil Nadu
- Established: 1951
- Abolished: 2009
- Total electors: 1,443,197 (2004)
- Reservation: None

Tiruchengode is a former constituency of the Lok Sabha in Tamil Nadu state. After delimitation in 2009, it is now a defunct constituency.

The region covered by this constituency is now a part of the Namakkal constituency.

== Assembly segments ==
Tiruchengode was composed of the following assembly segments:

1. Kapilamalai (defunct)
2. Tiruchengode (moved to Namakkal constituency)
3. Sangagiri (SC) (moved to Namakkal constituency)
4. Edappadi (moved to Salem constituency)
5. Modakurichi (moved to Erode constituency)
6. Erode (defunct)

== Members of Parliament ==
Year	Winner	Party
1951	S.K.Baby @ Kandaswami	Independent politician
1957	P. Subbarayan	Indian National Congress
1962	P. Subbarayan	Indian National Congress
1967	K. Anbazhagan	Dravida Munnetra Kazhagam
1971	M. Muthusami	Dravida Munnetra Kazhagam
1977	R. Kolanthaivelu	All India Anna Dravida Munnetra Kazhagam
1980	M. Kandaswamy	Dravida Munnetra Kazhagam
1984	P. Kannan	All India Anna Dravida Munnetra Kazhagam
1989	K. C. Palaniswamy	All India Anna Dravida Munnetra Kazhagam
1991	K. S. Soundaram	All India Anna Dravida Munnetra Kazhagam
1996	K. P. Ramalingam	Dravida Munnetra Kazhagam
1998	Edappadi K. Palaniswami	All India Anna Dravida Munnetra Kazhagam
1999	M. Kannappan	Marumalarchi Dravida Munnetra Kazhagam
2004	Subbulakshmi Jagadeesan	Dravida Munnetra Kazhagam

- Seat was decommissioned in 2008

== Election results ==
Vote share of Winning candidates
2004	58.0%
1999	48.4%
1998	53.1%
1996	55.0%
1991	65.3%
1989	62.3%
1984	58.7%
1980	50.4%
1977	58.2%
1971	54.5%
1967	54.0%
1962	42.5%
1957	57.7%
1952	54.8%

=== General Elections 2004 ===
2004 Indian general election : Tiruchengode
Party	Candidate	Votes	%	±%
DMK	Subbulakshmi Jagadeesan	501,569	58.02%	
AIADMK	Edappadi K. Palaniswami	3,22,172	37.27%	−11.26%
Independent	K. Palanisamy	14,208	1.64%	
BSP	K. M. Balasubramanyam	6,746	0.78%	
Independent	R. Palanisamy	5,282	0.61%	
Margin of victory		1,79,397	20.75%	20.21%
Turnout		8,64,451	59.92%	4.49%
Registered electors		14,43,197		−5.49%
DMK gain from MDMK		Swing	8.95%	

=== General Elections 1999 ===
1999 Indian general election : Tiruchengode
Party	Candidate	Votes	%	±%
MDMK	M. Kannappan	409,293	49.08%	
AIADMK	Edappadi K. Palaniswami	4,04,737	48.53%	−6.17%
PT	T. M. Kanagasabapathi	11,535	1.38%	
Margin of victory		4,556	0.55%	−13.27%
Turnout		8,34,015	55.41%	−9.44%
Registered electors		15,27,064		4.57%
MDMK gain from AIADMK		Swing	-7.57%	

=== General Elections 1998 ===
1998 Indian general election: Tiruchengode
Party	Candidate	Votes	%	±%
AIADMK	Edappadi K. Palaniswami	414,992	54.70%	▲21.27%
DMK	K. P. Ramalingam	310,183	40.89%	▼15.75%
INC	P. Palanisamy	28,421	3.75%	New
Margin of victory		104,809	13.82%	▼9.39%
Turnout		758,625	53.54%	▼11.31%
Registered electors		1,460,292		▲10.44%
AIADMK gain from DMK		Swing	▼1.94%	

=== General Elections 1996 ===
1996 Indian general election : Tiruchengode
Party	Candidate	Votes	%	±%
DMK	K. P. Ramalingam	471,533	56.64%	30.12%
AIADMK	A. V. Kumarasamy	2,78,345	33.44%	−33.36%
MDMK	P. Balakrishnan	40,041	4.81%	
AIIC(T)	K. Perumal	18,677	2.24%	
BJP	S. T. Ramalingam	10,264	1.23%	
Margin of victory		1,93,188	23.21%	−17.07%
Turnout		8,32,475	64.85%	2.01%
Registered electors		13,22,216		4.07%
DMK gain from AIADMK		Swing	-10.15%	

=== General Elections 1991 ===
1991 Indian general election : Tiruchengode
Party	Candidate	Votes	%	±%
AIADMK	K. S. Soundaram	521,580	66.80%	3.64%
DMK	K. P. Ramalingam	2,07,099	26.52%	−2.91%
PMK	A. Mannathan	43,563	5.58%	−0.20%
Margin of victory		3,14,481	40.27%	6.55%
Turnout		7,80,845	62.84%	−1.59%
Registered electors		12,70,472		0.07%
AIADMK hold		Swing	3.64%	

=== General Elections 1989 ===
1989 Indian general election : Tiruchengode
Party	Candidate	Votes	%	±%
AIADMK	K. C. Pallanishamy	509,847	63.16%	2.23%
DMK	C. Poongothi Thirumathi	2,37,576	29.43%	−8.93%
PMK	K. Chandrashekar	46,670	5.78%	
Independent	S. Chamumdeeswari	3,797	0.47%	
Margin of victory		2,72,271	33.73%	11.15%
Turnout		8,07,287	64.43%	−8.40%
Registered electors		12,69,558		27.19%
AIADMK hold		Swing	2.23%	

=== General Elections 1984 ===
1984 Indian general election : Tiruchengode
Party	Candidate	Votes	%	±%
AIADMK	P. Kannan	426,648	60.93%	13.38%
DMK	M. Kandaswamy	2,68,582	38.35%	−13.15%
Independent	V. K. Eswaramoorthi	5,039	0.72%	
Margin of victory		1,58,066	22.57%	18.61%
Turnout		7,00,269	72.84%	11.28%
Registered electors		9,98,164		12.24%
AIADMK gain from DMK		Swing	9.42%	

=== General Elections 1980 ===
1980 Indian general election : Tiruchengode
Party	Candidate	Votes	%	±%
DMK	M. Kandaswamy	276,015	51.51%	17.07%
AIADMK	R. Kolanthaivelu	2,54,797	47.55%	−12.03%
Independent	R. G. Samy	3,771	0.70%	
Margin of victory		21,218	3.96%	−21.18%
Turnout		5,35,881	61.56%	−1.65%
Registered electors		8,89,296		7.62%
DMK gain from AIADMK		Swing	-8.07%	

=== General Elections 1977 ===
1977 Indian general election : Tiruchengode
Party	Candidate	Votes	%	±%
AIADMK	R. Kolanthaivelu	303,738	59.58%	
DMK	M. Muthusamy	1,75,558	34.44%	−21.39%
Independent	K. Rajalingam	23,020	4.52%	
Independent	C. Seerangam	7,468	1.46%	
Margin of victory		1,28,180	25.14%	11.10%
Turnout		5,09,784	63.21%	−5.51%
Registered electors		8,26,331		29.70%
AIADMK gain from DMK		Swing	3.75%	

=== General Elections 1971 ===
1971 Indian general election : Tiruchengode
Party	Candidate	Votes	%	±%
DMK	M. Muthusamy	238,746	55.83%	0.54%
INC(O)	T. M. Kaliyannan	1,78,699	41.79%	
Independent	C. Seerangan	10,201	2.39%	
Margin of victory		60,047	14.04%	2.56%
Turnout		4,27,646	68.72%	−6.31%
Registered electors		6,37,099		11.01%
DMK hold		Swing	0.54%	

=== General Elections 1967 ===
1967 Indian general election : Tiruchengode
Party	Candidate	Votes	%	±%
DMK	K. Anbazhagan	232,365	55.29%	16.39%
INC	T. M. Kaliannan	1,84,114	43.81%	0.06%
Independent	S. S. Moopan	3,797	0.90%	
Margin of victory		48,251	11.48%	6.63%
Turnout		4,20,276	75.03%	13.02%
Registered electors		5,73,903		37.74%
DMK gain from INC		Swing	11.54%	

=== General Elections 1962 ===
1962 Indian general election : Tiruchengode
Party	Candidate	Votes	%	±%
INC	P. Subbarayan	109,799	43.74%	−13.98%
DMK	S. Kandappan	97,635	38.90%	
PSP	S. Govindasami	39,937	15.91%	
Independent	A. R. Maruthuvamani	3,634	1.45%	
Margin of victory		12,164	4.85%	−35.45%
Turnout		2,51,005	62.01%	25.22%
Registered electors		4,16,657		1.79%
INC hold		Swing	-13.98%	

=== General Elections 1957 ===
1957 Indian general election : Tiruchengode
Party	Candidate	Votes	%	±%
INC	Dr. P. Subbarayan	86,935	57.72%	12.50%
PSP	Palaniappa Bakthar	26,240	17.42%	
Independent	Ramalingam	23,719	15.75%	
Independent	Paramasiva Gounder	13,718	9.11%	
Margin of victory		60,695	40.30%	30.74%
Turnout		1,50,612	36.80%	−10.39%
Registered electors		4,09,325		10.59%
INC gain from Independent		Swing	2.94%	

=== General Elections 1951 ===
1951–52 Indian general election : Tiruchengode
Party	Candidate	Votes	%	±%
Independent	S. K. Baby Alias Kandaswami	95,664	54.78%	
INC	Dr. P. Subbarayan	78,973	45.22%	45.22%
Margin of victory		16,691	9.56%	
Turnout		1,74,637	47.18%	
Registered electors		3,70,121		0.00%
Independent win (new seat)				

== See also ==
- Tiruchengode
- List of constituencies of the Lok Sabha
