= B. Akber Pasha =

Indian Politician

Member of Loksabha

Personal details
- Born: 1931
- Party: Indian National Congress

B. Akber Pasha (born 6 June 1931) was an Indian politician of the Indian National Congress who served as a member of the Lok Sabha from Vellore in 1991.

== Early life and education ==
He was born on 16 June 1931 in Ambur, Vellore district, the son of Hayat Pasha Sahib. Akber studied Bachelor of Science at Presidency College, Madras and A.C. College of Technology, Madras

== Positions held ==
- Indian National Congress President Ambur City.
- Indian National Congress Member of the State Committee Tamil Nadu.
- Vice President of the Indian National Congress, Vellore District, 1970 - 1976.
- 1975 - 1976 President of the Ambur Lions Club. And lifetime membership.
- Treasurer of the Indian National Congress, Vellore District, 1976 - 1978.
- Vice President and Chairman of the State Minority Section from 1978 - 1980.
- 1991 Member of the Vellore Lok Sabha constituency.
