= A. S. Kannan =

Indian politician

Member-Tamil Nadu Legislative Assembly
- In office 2001–2006
- Preceded by: K. Sundaram
- Succeeded by: P. Balaraman
- Constituency: Ponneri

Personal details
- Born: 7 July 1941
- Party: Communist Party of India
- Profession: small scale business man

A. S. Kannan is an Indian politician and a former member of the Tamil Nadu Legislative Assembly. He is from Ponneri town in the Thiruvallur district. A member of the Communist Party of India, he successfully contested the 2001 Tamil Nadu Legislative Assembly election from the Ponneri constituency and became a Member of the Legislative Assembly.

== Electoral performance ==
=== 2001 ===
2001 Tamil Nadu Legislative Assembly election: Ponneri
Party	Candidate	Votes	%	±%
CPI	A. S. Kannan	81,408	54.58%	New
DMK	K. Sundaram	54,018	36.22%	−25.5
MDMK	P. Duraikkannu	4,319	2.90%	−2.31
Independent	G. Devarajan	3,753	2.52%	New
Independent	A. D. Rathinam	2,211	1.48%	New
Puratchi Bharatham	M. Jayaseelan	1,326	0.89%	New
Independent	N. Maran	827	0.55%	New
Margin of victory		27,390	18.36%	−13.63%
Turnout		1,49,143	61.24%	−6.56%
Registered electors		2,43,530		
CPI gain from DMK		Swing	-7.13%	
