= Sriperumbudur Lok Sabha constituency =

Parliamentary constituency in Tamil Nadu, India

Coordinates: 13.0°N 79.9°E

Sriperumbudur
- Lok Sabha constituency
- Interactive map of Sriperumbudur Loksabha constituency, post-2008 delimitation

Constituency details
- Country: India
- Region: South India
- State: Tamil Nadu
- Assembly constituencies: Maduravoyal; Ambattur; Alandur; Sriperumbudur; Pallavaram; Tambaram
- Established: 1967–present
- Total electors: 23,82,578
- Reservation: None

Member of Parliament
- 18th Lok Sabha
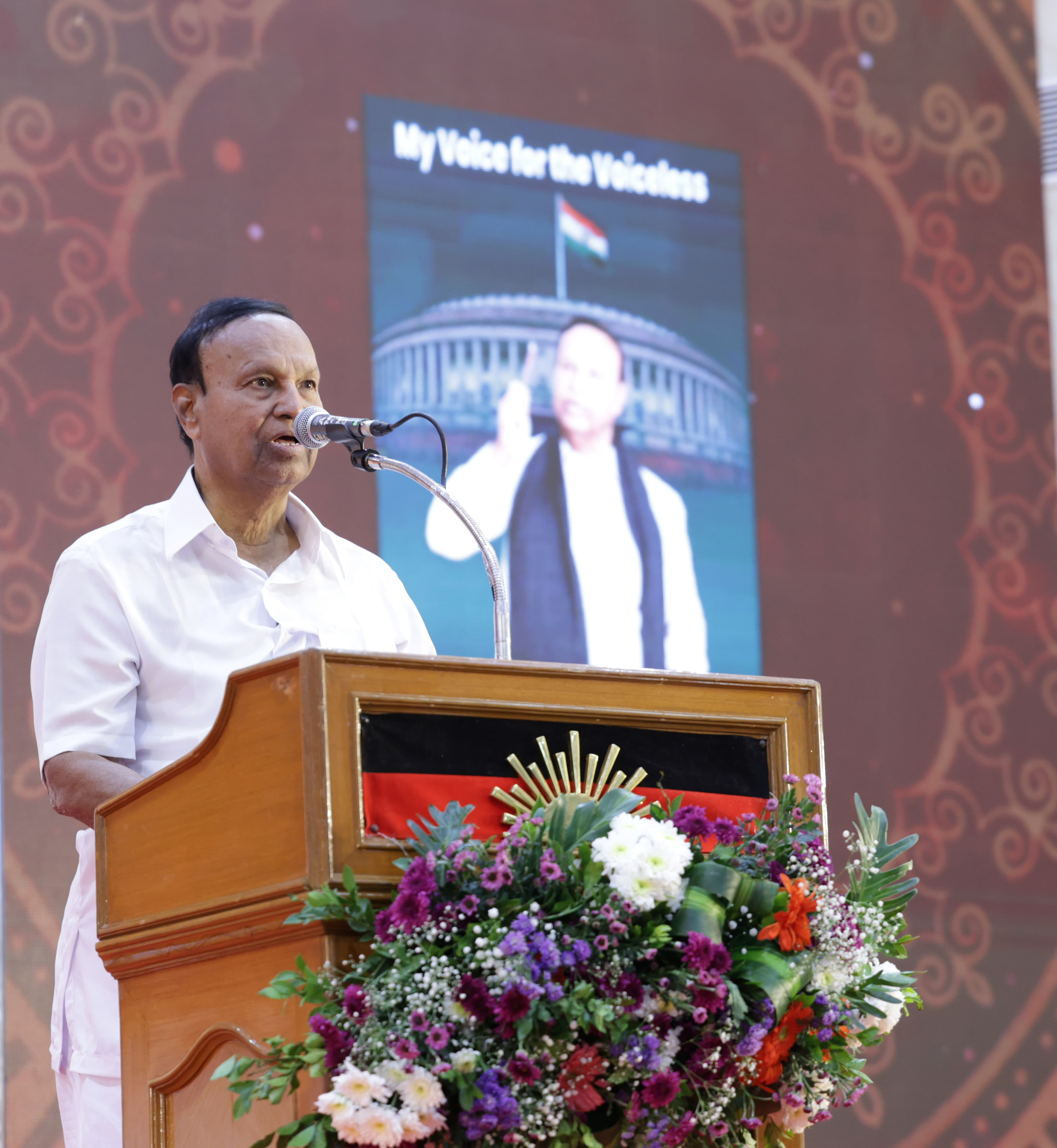
- Incumbent T. R. Baalu; Treasurer of Dravida Munnetra Kazhagam
- Party: DMK
- Alliance: None
- Elected year: 2024
- Preceded by: K. N. Ramachandran; AIADMK

Sriperumbudur is one of the parliamentary constituencies in Tamil Nadu. Its Tamil Nadu Parliamentary Constituency number is 5 of 39. It has a very huge volume of voters with nearly twenty four lakhs.

== Assembly segments ==
=== 2009–present ===
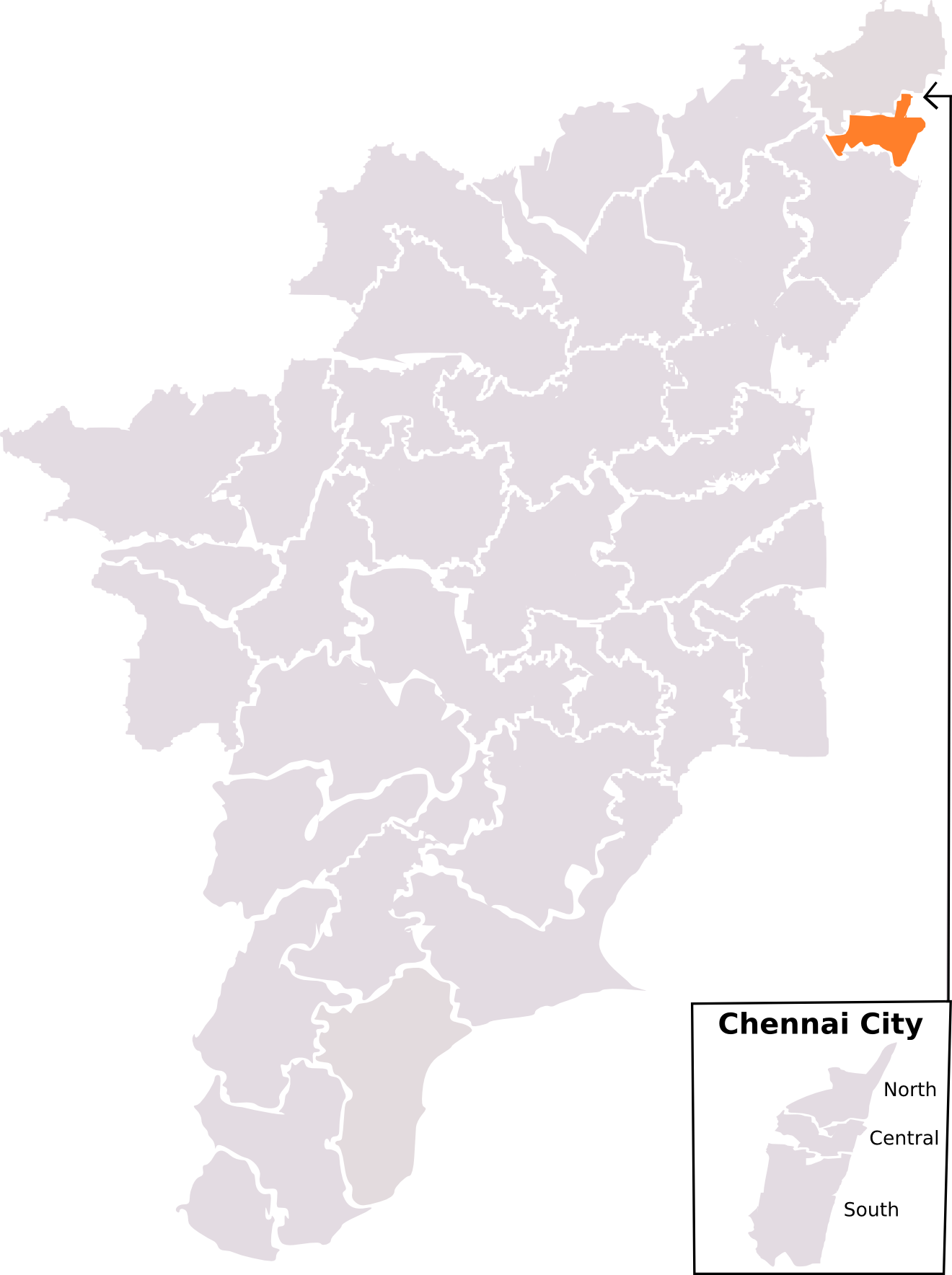
Sriperumbudur constituency as laid out by 2008 Delimitation

Constituency number	Name	Reserved for (SC/ST/None)	District	Party	2024 Lead
7	Maduravoyal	None	Chennai	TVK	DMK
8	Ambattur	None	Chennai	TVK	DMK
28	Alandur	None	Chennai	TVK	DMK
29	Sriperumbudur	SC	Kancheepuram	TVK	DMK
30	Pallavaram	None	Chengalpattu	TVK	DMK
31	Tambaram	None	Chengalpattu	TVK	DMK

=== Before 2009 ===
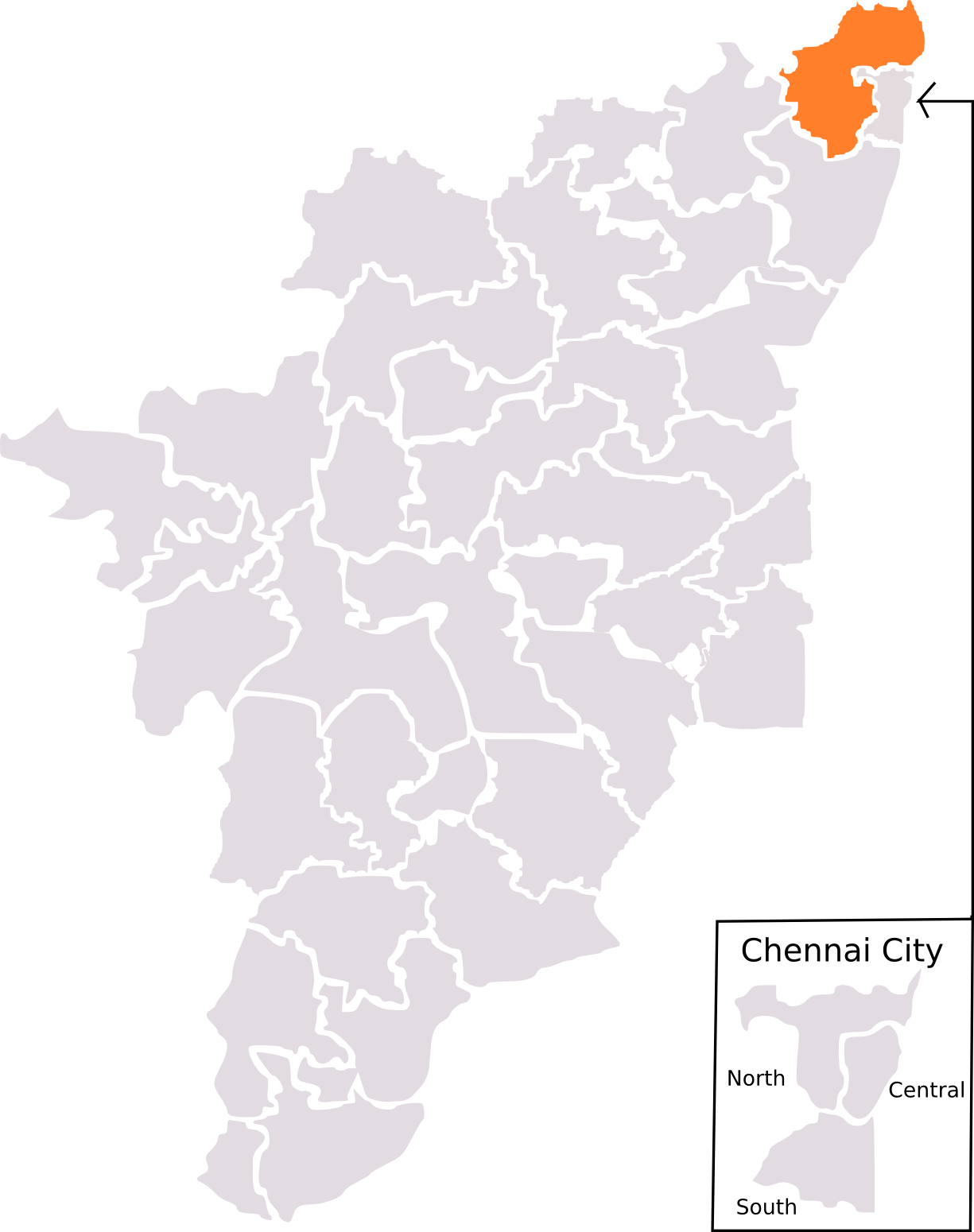
Sriperumbudur constituency as laid out by 1971 Delimitation. The boundaries for this constituency lasted until 2004 election, which was then replaced by 2008 Delimitation.

1. Gummidipundi (moved to Thiruvallur constituency after 2009)
2. Ponneri (SC) (moved to Thiruvallur constituency after 2009)
3. Sriperumbudur
4. Poonamallee (moved to Thiruvallur constituency after 2009)
5. Tiruvallur (moved to Thiruvallur constituency after 2009)
6. Tiruttani (moved to Arakkonam constituency after 2009)

== Members of the Parliament ==
Election Year	Winner	Party
1962	P. Sivasankaran	Dravida Munnetra Kazhagam
1967	P. Sivasankaran	Dravida Munnetra Kazhagam
1971	T.S. Lakshmanan	Dravida Munnetra Kazhagam
1977	Seeralan Jaganathan	All India Anna Dravida Munnetra Kazhagam
1980	T. Nagaratnam	Dravida Munnetra Kazhagam
1984	Margatham Chandrasekar	Indian National Congress
1989	Margatham Chandrasekar	Indian National Congress
1991	Margatham Chandrasekar	Indian National Congress
1996	T. Nagaratnam	Dravida Munnetra Kazhagam
1998	K. Venugopal	All India Anna Dravida Munnetra Kazhagam
1999	A. Krishnaswamy	Dravida Munnetra Kazhagam
2004	A. Krishnaswamy	Dravida Munnetra Kazhagam
2009	T. R. Baalu	Dravida Munnetra Kazhagam
2014	K. N. Ramachandran	All India Anna Dravida Munnetra Kazhagam
2019	T. R. Baalu	Dravida Munnetra Kazhagam
2024	T. R. Baalu	Dravida Munnetra Kazhagam

== Election results ==
Vote share of Winning candidates
2024	52.65%
2019	56.53%
2014	43.35%
2009	44.44%
2004	61.39%
1999	52.88%
1998	46.89%
1996	57.94%
1991	61.71%
1989	54.90%
1984	59.54%
1980	57.45%
1977	53.09%
1971	59.98%
1967	60.61%
1962	52.56%

=== General Elections 2024 ===
2024 Indian general election: Sriperumbudur
Party	Candidate	Votes	%	±%
DMK	T. R. Baalu	758,611	52.63	▼3.90
AIADMK	G. Premkumar	271,582	18.84	New
TMC(M)	V. N. Venugopal	210,110	14.58	New
NTK	Dr. V. Ravichandiran	140,233	9.73	▲3.67
NOTA	None of the above	26,450	1.84	▲0.18
Margin of victory		487,029	33.79	▼2.41
Turnout		1,440,935	60.48	▼1.79
Registered electors		23,82,119		
DMK hold		Swing	▼3.90	

=== General Elections 2019 ===
2019 Indian general election: Sriperumbudur
Party	Candidate	Votes	%	±%
DMK	T. R. Baalu	793,281	56.53	21.33
PMK	A. Vaithilingam	2,85,326	20.33	
MNM	M. Sridhar	1,35,530	9.66	
NTK	H. Mahendran	1,35,525	9.66	
AMMK	Tambaram G. Narayanan	41,497	2.96	
NOTA	None Of The Above	23,343	1.66	−0.53
ACDP	S. Rajasekaran	13,746	0.98	
Margin of victory		5,07,955	36.20	28.05
Turnout		14,03,178	62.27	−2.41
Registered electors		22,53,448		15.77
DMK gain from AIADMK		Swing	13.18	

=== General Elections 2014 ===
2014 Indian general election: Sriperumbudur
Party	Candidate	Votes	%	±%
AIADMK	K. N. Ramachandran	545,820	43.35	
DMK	S. Jagathrakshakan	4,43,174	35.20	−9.23
MDMK	Dr. R. Masilamani	1,87,094	14.86	
INC	Arul Anbarasu	39,015	3.10	
NOTA	None Of The Above	27,676	2.20	
AAP	S. A. N. Vasigaran	18,963	1.51	
Margin of victory		1,02,646	8.15	5.00
Turnout		12,58,971	64.68	−1.39
Registered electors		19,46,503		62.04
AIADMK gain from DMK		Swing	-1.08	

=== General Elections 2009 ===
2009 Indian general election: Sriperumbudur
Party	Candidate	Votes	%	±%
DMK	T. R. Baalu	352,641	44.44	−16.96
PMK	A. K. Moorthy	3,27,605	41.28	
DMDK	M. Arun Subramanian	84,530	10.65	
Margin of victory		25,036	3.15	−24.76
Turnout		7,93,597	66.06	6.84
Rejected ballots		2	0.00	
Registered electors		12,01,237		−15.62
DMK hold		Swing	-16.96	

=== General Elections 2004 ===
2004 Indian general election: Sriperumbudur
Party	Candidate	Votes	%	±%
DMK	A. Krishnaswamy	517,617	61.39	8.51
AIADMK	Dr. P. Venugopal	2,82,271	33.48	−9.12
Independent	M. Vijayaragunathan	11,995	1.42	
Independent	K. Balakrishnan	11,517	1.37	
JP	S. Sambath	5,815	0.69	
Independent	M. Ravi	4,194	0.50	
BSP	J. K. Jayakumar	3,805	0.45	
Margin of victory		2,35,346	27.91	17.63
Turnout		8,43,101	59.22	4.21
Rejected ballots		59	0.01	
Registered electors		14,23,561		5.15
DMK hold		Swing	8.51	

=== General Elections 1999 ===
1999 Indian general election: Sriperumbudur
Party	Candidate	Votes	%	±%
DMK	A. Krishnaswamy	385,558	52.88	−5.05
AIADMK	K. Venugopal	3,10,556	42.60	
TMC(M)	J. Pushparaman	28,292	3.88	
Margin of victory		75,002	10.29	−22.67
Turnout		7,29,076	55.02	−12.35
Registered electors		13,53,858		6.89
DMK hold		Swing	-5.05	

=== General Elections 1998 ===
1998 Indian general election: Sriperumbudur
Party	Candidate	Votes	%	±%
AIADMK	K. Venugopal	326,528	46.89	
DMK	T. Nagaratnam	3,02,733	43.48	
INC	Dr. K. Jayakumar	64,944	9.33	
Margin of victory		23,795	3.42	−29.54
Turnout		6,96,327	57.23	−10.14
Registered electors		12,66,643		9.52
AIADMK gain from DMK		Swing	-11.04	

=== General Elections 1996 ===
1996 Indian general election: Sriperumbudur
Party	Candidate	Votes	%	±%
DMK	T. Nagaratnam	431,919	57.94	24.03
INC	Lata Priyakumar	1,86,208	24.98	−36.73
Independent	M. Moorthy	66,760	8.96	
MDMK	Kavinger Kudiyarasu	44,884	6.02	
BJP	K. Arjunan	10,861	1.46	−1.34
Margin of victory		2,45,711	32.96	5.15
Turnout		7,45,490	67.37	2.03
Registered electors		11,56,491		11.80
DMK gain from INC		Swing	-3.77	

=== General Elections 1991 ===
1991 Indian general election: Sriperumbudur
Party	Candidate	Votes	%	±%
INC	Maragatham Chandrasekar	400,741	61.71	6.81
DMK	K. Sundaram	2,20,169	33.91	0.88
BJP	Somu Alias Somusundaram	18,144	2.79	
Independent	M. Chockalingam	5,503	0.85	
Independent	K. Mahalingam	4,812	0.74	
Margin of victory		1,80,572	27.81	5.93
Turnout		6,49,369	65.34	−3.70
Registered electors		10,34,447		−0.31
INC hold		Swing	6.81	

=== General Elections 1989 ===
1989 Indian general election: Sriperumbudur
Party	Candidate	Votes	%	±%
INC	Maragatham Chandrasekar	387,795	54.90	−4.63
DMK	K. Ganesan	2,33,244	33.02	−6.91
Independent	N. Gopalan	74,913	10.61	
Margin of victory		1,54,551	21.88	2.28
Turnout		7,06,354	69.04	−5.55
Registered electors		10,37,657		31.74
INC hold		Swing	-4.63	

=== General Elections 1984 ===
1984 Indian general election: Sriperumbudur
Party	Candidate	Votes	%	±%
INC	Maragatham Chandrasekar	332,468	59.54	
DMK	T. Nagaratnam	2,22,994	39.93	−17.52
Independent	G. A. Appan	2,975	0.53	
Margin of victory		1,09,474	19.60	0.87
Turnout		5,58,437	74.59	11.99
Registered electors		7,87,638		9.28
INC gain from DMK		Swing	2.08	

=== General Elections 1980 ===
1980 Indian general election: Sriperumbudur
Party	Candidate	Votes	%	±%
DMK	T. Nagaratnam	253,912	57.45	
AIADMK	R. P. Marutharajaa	1,71,135	38.72	−14.37
Independent	M. Moorty	6,317	1.43	
Independent	Emperuman V	6,017	1.36	
INC(U)	A. R. Shahul Hameed	2,414	0.55	
Margin of victory		82,777	18.73	8.55
Turnout		4,41,945	62.60	−3.86
Registered electors		7,20,766		3.57
DMK gain from AIADMK		Swing	4.36	

=== General Elections 1977 ===
1977 Indian general election: Sriperumbudur
Party	Candidate	Votes	%	±%
AIADMK	S. Jaganathan	239,632	53.09	
INC(O)	T. P. Elumalai	1,93,700	42.91	2.89
Independent	N. Angamuthu	18,033	4.00	
Margin of victory		45,932	10.18	−9.78
Turnout		4,51,365	66.46	−4.05
Registered electors		6,95,900		−4.71
AIADMK gain from DMK		Swing	-6.89	

=== General Elections 1971 ===
1971 Indian general election: Sriperumbudur
Party	Candidate	Votes	%	±%
DMK	T. S. Latchumanan	300,663	59.98	−0.63
INC(O)	P. Kakkan	2,00,617	40.02	2.13
Margin of victory		1,00,046	19.96	−2.76
Turnout		5,01,280	70.50	−6.76
Registered electors		7,30,302		22.71
DMK hold		Swing	-0.63	

=== General Elections 1967 ===
1967 Indian general election: Sriperumbudur
Party	Candidate	Votes	%	±%
DMK	P. Sivasankaran	271,528	60.61	8.05
INC	K. Sambandan	1,69,763	37.89	−9.55
Independent	A. M. Ratnaswamy	6,727	1.50	
Margin of victory		1,01,765	22.71	17.59
Turnout		4,48,018	77.26	10.54
Registered electors		5,95,157		27.95
DMK hold		Swing	8.05	

=== General Elections 1962 ===
1962 Indian general election: Sriperumbudur
Party	Candidate	Votes	%	±%
DMK	P. Sivasankaran	157,733	52.56	
INC	K. Munuswamy	1,42,361	47.44	
Margin of victory		15,372	5.12	
Turnout		3,00,094	66.73	
Registered electors		4,65,133		
DMK win (new seat)				

== See also ==
- Sriperumbudur
- List of constituencies of the Lok Sabha
