= 1977 Indian general election in Tamil Nadu =

Indian general election in Tamil Nadu, 1977
- 16–20 March 1977

39 (of 542) seats in the Lok Sabha
- Registered: 27,187,417
- Turnout: 18,252,182 (67.13%) ▼4.69%
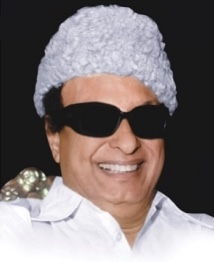

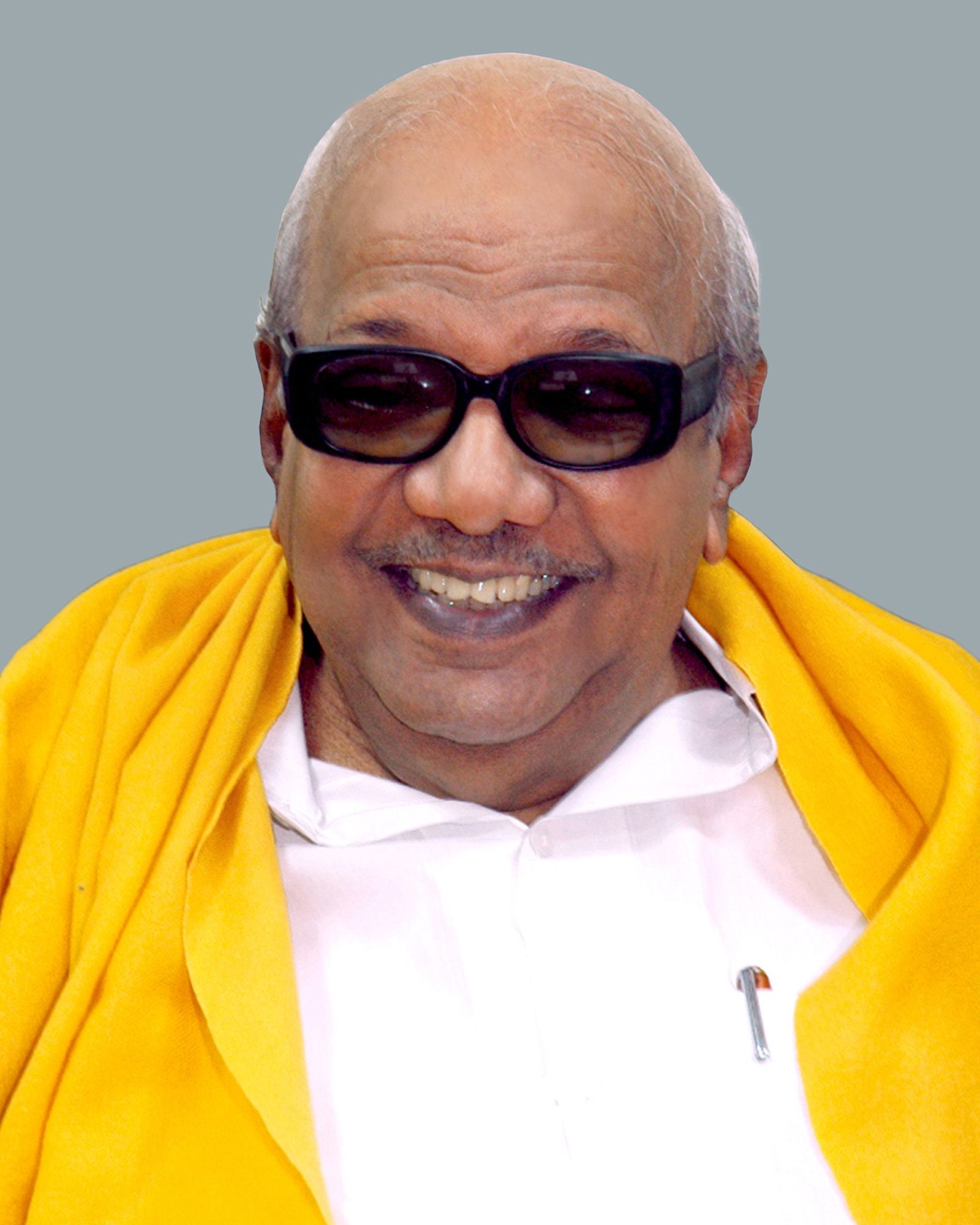
	First party	Second party
Leader	M. G. Ramachandran	M. Karunanidhi
Party	AIADMK	DMK
Alliance	Congress Front	Janata alliance
Leader's seat	Did not contest	Did not contest
Seats won	34	5
Seat change	▲21	▼19
Popular vote	10,164,615	6,479,436
Percentage	56.91%	36.28%
Swing	▲38.97%	▼29.40%
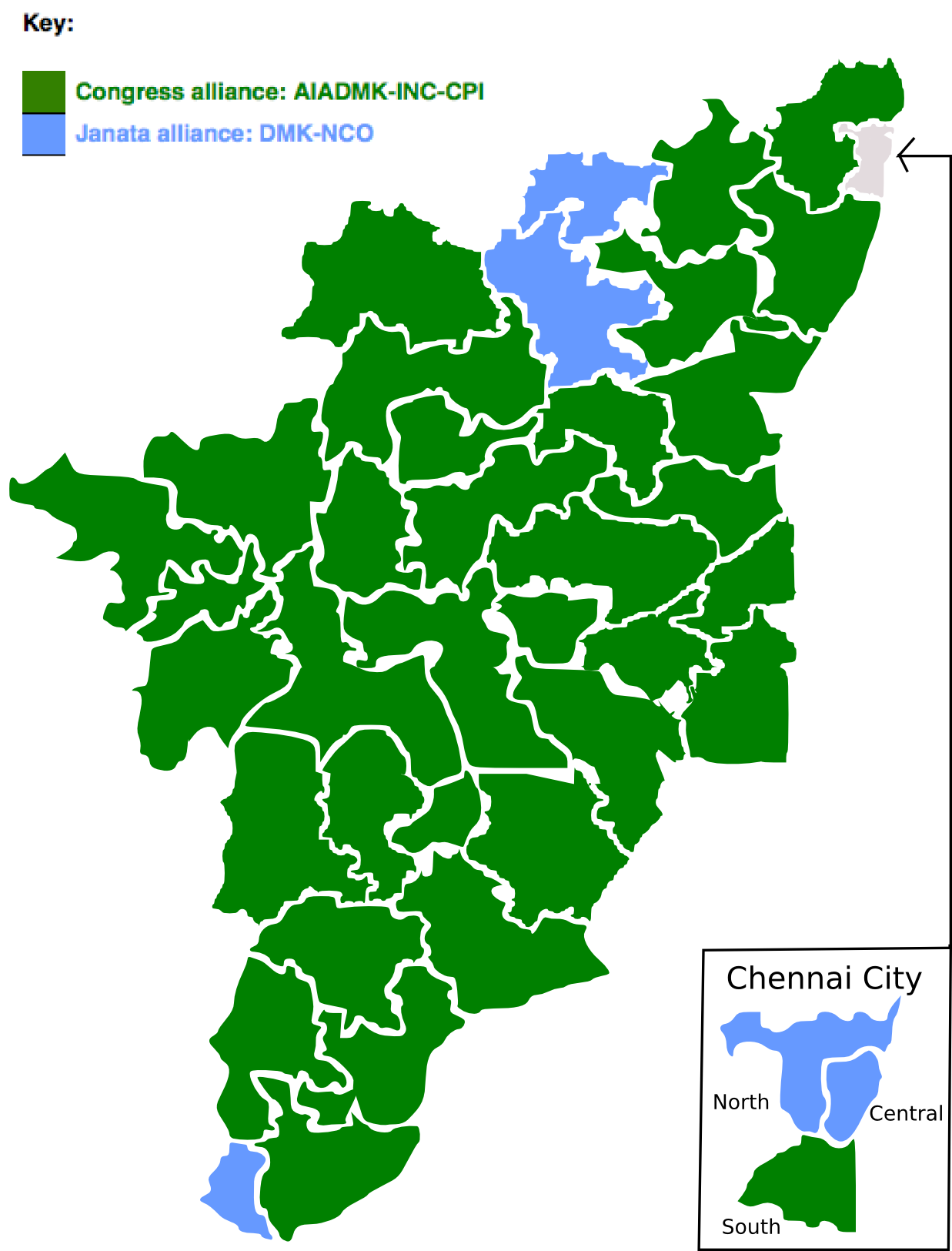
- 1977 Election map (by constituencies); Green = INC+ and Blue = JP+
Prime Minister before election
Indira Gandhi
INC(R)
Prime Minister after election
Morarji Desai
JP

The 1977 Indian general election polls in Tamil Nadu were held for 39 seats in the state. The result was a big victory for Indian National Congress under Indira Gandhi and its allies All India Anna Dravida Munnetra Kazhagam and Communist Party of India winning 34 seats, while Janata Party and its allies Dravida Munnetra Kazhagam and Indian National Congress (Organisation) won only 5 seats. The Janata Party ended up winning this election. After the election, the AIADMK ended up supporting the Janata Party under Morarji Desai. In 1979, AIADMK continued to support Janata Party, by supporting Charan Singh, which resulted in the appointment of two AIADMK cabinet members.

== Seat Allotment ==
=== AIADMK-led Alliance ===
No.	Party	Election Symbol	Leader	Seats
1.	All India Anna Dravida Munnetra Kazhagam		M. G. Ramachandran	20
2.	Indian National Congress (R)		Indira Gandhi	15
3.	Communist Party of India		M. Kalyanasundaram	3
4.	Indian Union Muslim League (Note: Scales Symbol was Independent Symbol throughout India, except Punjab in 1977 elections.)		K. M. Kader Mohideen	1

=== Janata Alliance ===
No.	Party	Election Symbol	Leader	Seats
1.	Dravida Munnetra Kazhagam		M. Karunanidhi	19
2.	Indian National Congress (Organization)		P. Ramachandran	18
3.	Communist Party of India (Marxist)		A. Balasubramaniam	2

== List of Candidates ==
Constituency		AIADMK+		DMK+	
#	Name	Party	Candidate	Party	Candidate
1	Madras North	ADMK	K. M. Manoharan	DMK	A. V. P. Asaithambi
2	Madras Central	ADMK	K. M. Raja Mohamed	INC(O)	P. Ramachandran
3	Madras South	INC(R)	Ramaswamy Venkataraman	DMK	Murasoli Maran
4	Sriperumbudur (SC)	ADMK	S. M. Jaganathan	INC(O)	T. P. Elumalai
5	Chengalpattu	ADMK	R. M. Mohanarangam	DMK	Era Sezhiyan
6	Arakkonam	INC(R)	O. V. Alagesan	DMK	Arcot N. Veeraswami
7	Vellore	IND	A. K. A. Abdul Samad	INC(O)	V. Dhandayuthapani
8	Tiruppattur	ADMK	C. K. M. Chinnaraje Gounder	DMK	C. N. Visvanathan
9	Wandiwash	ADMK	M. Venugopal Gounder	DMK	Durai Murugan
10	Tindivanam	INC(R)	M. R. Lakshmi Narayanan	DMK	V. Krishnamoorthy
11	Cuddalore	INC(R)	G. Bhuvaraghan	INC(O)	S. Radhakrishnan
12	Chidambaram (SC)	ADMK	A. M. Murugesan	DMK	N. Rajangam
13	Dharmapuri	INC(R)	K. Ramamurthy	INC(O)	P. Ponnuswami
14	Krishnagiri	ADMK	P. V. M. Periasamy	DMK	M. Kamalanathan
15	Rasipuram (SC)	INC(R)	Devarajan B.	INC(O)	Jothi Venkatachalam
16	Salem	ADMK	P. M. Kannan	DMK	K. Rajaram
17	Tiruchengode	ADMK	R. Kolanthaivelu	DMK	M. Muthusamy
18	Nilgiris	ADMK	P. S. Ramalingam	INC(O)	M. K. Nanja Gowder
19	Gobichettipalayam	INC(R)	K. S. Ramaswamy	INC(O)	N. K. Karuppuswamy
20	Coimbatore	CPI	Parvathi Krishnan	INC(O)	S. V. Lakshmanan
21	Pollachi (SC)	ADMK	K. A. M. Raju	DMK	C. T. Dhandapani
22	Palani	INC(R)	Chidambaram Subramaniam	DMK	K. N. Saminathan
23	Dindigul	ADMK	Maya Thevar	CPI(M)	A. Balasubramanyam
24	Madurai	INC(R)	R. V. Swaminathan	CPI(M)	P. Ramamurthi
25	Periyakulam	ADMK	S. M. Ramasamy	DMK	Palanivel Rajan
26	Karur	INC(R)	K. Gopal	INC(O)	M. Meenakshisundaram
27	Tiruchirappalli	CPI	M. Kalyanasundaram	INC(O)	Y. Venkateswara Dikshidar
28	Perambalur (SC)	ADMK	A. M. Asokaraj	DMK	J. S. Raju
29	Mayiladuthurai	INC(R)	Kudanthai N. Ramalingam	INC(O)	S. Govindasamy
30	Nagapattinam (SC)	CPI	S. G. Muruguaiyan	DMK	M. Thazhai Karunnanithi
31	Thanjavur	ADMK	S. D. Somasundaram	DMK	L. Ganesan
32	Pudukkottai	ADMK	V. S. M. Elanchezhian	INC(O)	V. Vairava Thevar
33	Sivaganga	ADMK	P. Thiagarajan M.	INC(O)	R. Ramanathan Chettiar
34	Ramanathapuram	ADMK	P. M. Anbalagan	DMK	M. S. K. Sathiyandran
35	Sivakasi	INC(R)	V. Jayalakshmi	INC(O)	G. Ramanujam
36	Tirunelveli	ADMK	V. M. Arunachalam	DMK	K. M. Samsuddin
37	Tenkasi (SC)	INC(R)	M. Arunachalam	INC(O)	S. Rajagopalan
38	Tiruchendur	INC(R)	K. T. Kosalram	INC(O)	Devadasan Edwin
39	Nagercoil	INC(R)	M. Moses	INC(O)	Kumari Ananthan

== Voting and results ==
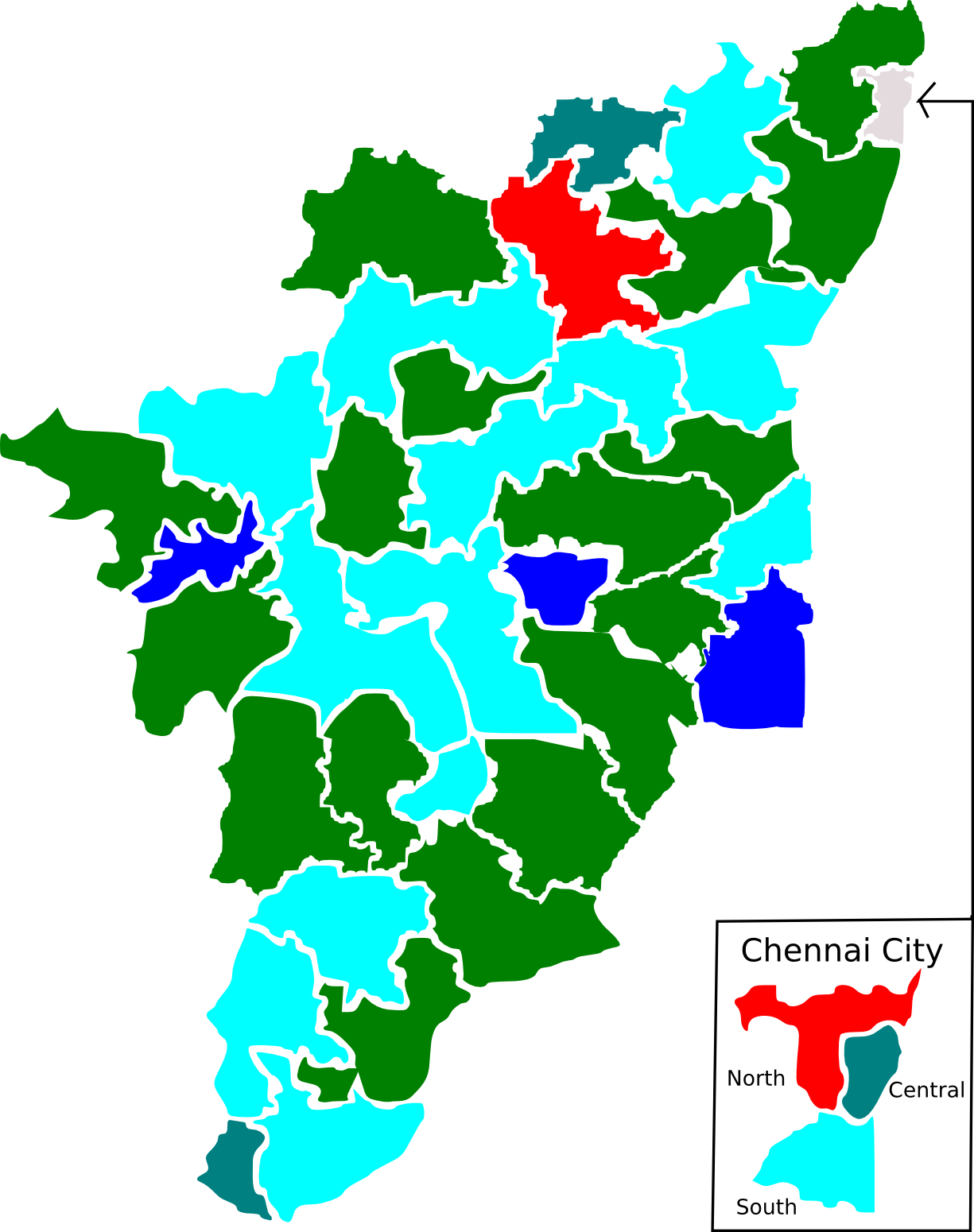
Election map of results based on parties. Colours are based on the results table on the left

Alliance	Party	Popular Vote	Percentage	Swing	Seats won	Seat Change
AIADMK+	All India Anna Dravida Munnetra Kazhagam	5,365,076	30.04%	new party	17	new party
AIADMK+	Indian National Congress	3,977,306	22.27%	▲9.76%	14	▲5
AIADMK+	Communist Party of India	822,233	4.60%	▼0.83%	3	▼1
AIADMK+	Total	10,164,615	56.91%	▲38.97%	34	▲21
DMK+	Indian National Congress (Organisation)	3,156,116	17.67%	▼12.76%	3	▲2
DMK+	Dravida Munnetra Kazhagam	3,323,320	18.61%	▼16.64%	2	▼21
DMK+	Total	6,479,436	36.28%	▼29.40%	5	▼19
Communist Party of India (Marxist)		279,081	1.56%	▼0.08%	0	Steady
Republican Party of India		3,809	0.02%		0	
Independents		932,966	5.22%	▲3.06%	0	Steady
Total		17,859,907	100.00%	Steady	39	Steady
Valid Votes		17,859,907	97.85%			
Invalid Votes		392,275	2.15%			
Total Votes		18,252,182	100.00%			
Registered Voters/Turnout		27,187,417	67.13%	▼4.69%		

== List of Elected MPs ==
Constituency		Winner				Runner Up				Margin	%
#	Name	Candidate	Party	Votes	%	Candidate	Party	Votes	%	Margin	%
1	Madras North	A. V. P. Asai Thambi	DMK	250,852	54.26	K. Manoharan	ADMK	205,749	44.51	45,103	9.75
2	Madras Central	P. Ramachandran	INC(O)	259,437	56.52	K. Raja Mohamed	ADMK	186,026	40.52	73,411	16.00
3	Madras South	R. Venkataraman	INC(R)	241,033	50.79	Murasoli Maran	DMK	226,204	47.66	14,829	3.13
4	Sriperumbudur (SC)	S. Jaganathan	ADMK	239,632	53.09	T. P. Elumalai	INC(O)	193,700	42.91	45,932	10.18
5	Chengalpattu	R. Mohanarangam	ADMK	236,818	52.59	Era Sezhiyan	DMK	201,179	44.68	35,639	7.91
6	Arakkonam	O. V. Alagesan	INC(R)	243,818	52.40	N. Veeraswami	DMK	185,954	39.96	57,864	12.44
7	Vellore	V. Dhandayuthapani	INC(O)	220,994	49.22	Abdul Samad	IND	217,833	48.51	3,161	0.71
8	Tiruppattur	C. N. Viswanathan	DMK	257,322	60.06	C. K. Chinnaraje Gounder	ADMK	158,656	37.03	98,666	23.03
9	Wandiwash	Venugopal Gounder	ADMK	267,930	58.41	Durai Murugan	DMK	186,798	40.72	81,132	17.69
10	Tindivanam	M. R. Lakshminarayanan	INC(R)	233,155	53.82	V. Krishnamoorthy	DMK	183,670	42.40	49,485	11.42
11	Cuddalore	G. Bhuvarahan	INC(R)	231,128	55.75	S. Radhakrishnan	INC(O)	142,071	34.27	89,057	21.48
12	Chidambaram (SC)	A. Murugesan	ADMK	278,406	62.20	N. Rajangam	DMK	169,172	37.80	109,234	24.40
13	Dharmapuri	K. Ramamurthy	INC(R)	239,908	60.25	P. Ponnuswami	INC(O)	134,222	33.71	105,686	26.54
14	Krishnagiri	P. V. Periasamy	ADMK	222,979	65.64	M. Kamalanathan	DMK	103,751	30.54	119,228	35.10
15	Rasipuram (SC)	B. Devarajan	INC(R)	275,212	62.30	Jothivenkatachallum	INC(O)	141,774	32.09	133,438	30.21
16	Salem	P. Kannan	ADMK	254,138	58.71	K. Rajaram	DMK	174,534	40.32	79,604	18.39
17	Tiruchengode	R. Kolanthaivelu	ADMK	303,738	59.58	M. Muthusamy	DMK	175,558	34.44	128,180	25.14
18	Nilgiris	P. S. Ramalingam	ADMK	241,777	55.85	M. K. Nanja Gowder	INC(O)	182,431	42.14	59,346	13.71
19	Gobichettipalayam	K. S. Ramaswamy	INC(R)	255,120	58.58	N. K. Karuppuswamy	INC(O)	149,662	34.37	105,458	24.21
20	Coimbatore	Parvathi Krishnan	CPI	267,424	52.06	S. V. Lakshmanan	INC(O)	246,246	47.94	21,178	4.12
21	Pollachi (SC)	K. A. Raju	ADMK	259,388	64.48	C. T. Dhandapani	DMK	135,194	33.61	124,194	30.87
22	Palani	C. Subramaniam	INC(R)	351,897	71.70	K. N. Saminathan	DMK	130,129	26.51	221,768	45.19
23	Dindigul	K. Maya Thevar	ADMK	283,341	59.60	A. Balasubramanyam	CPI(M)	114,117	24.00	169,224	35.60
24	Madurai	R. V. Swaminathan	INC(R)	299,309	62.13	P. Ramamurthi	CPI(M)	164,964	34.24	134,345	27.89
25	Periyakulam	S. Ramasamy	ADMK	328,100	69.65	M. Palanivel Rajan	DMK	123,708	26.26	204,392	43.39
26	Karur	K. Gopal	INC(R)	315,259	62.26	M. Meenakshisundaram	INC(O)	169,739	33.52	145,520	28.74
27	Tiruchirappalli	M. Kalyanasundaram	CPI	276,390	57.10	Y. Venkateswara Dikshidar	INC(O)	200,345	41.39	76,045	15.71
28	Perambalur (SC)	A. Asokaraj	ADMK	326,046	68.62	J. S. Raju	DMK	146,019	30.73	180,027	37.89
29	Mayiladuthurai	N. Kudanthai Ramalingam	INC(R)	272,202	55.94	S. Govindasamy	INC(O)	197,937	40.68	74,265	15.26
30	Nagapattinam (SC)	S. G. Murugaiyan	CPI	278,419	53.95	M. Thazhai Karunnanithi	DMK	237,609	46.05	40,810	7.90
31	Thanjavur	S. D. Somasundaram	ADMK	289,059	60.17	L. Ganesan	DMK	191,316	39.83	97,743	20.34
32	Pudukkottai	V. S. Elanchezhian	ADMK	342,120	65.27	V. Vairava Thevar	INC(O)	118,505	22.61	223,615	42.66
33	Sivaganga	P. Thiagarajan	ADMK	338,999	71.30	R. Ramanathan Chettiar	INC(O)	127,466	26.81	211,533	44.49
34	Ramanathapuram	P. Anbalagan	ADMK	297,612	67.62	M. S. K. Sathiyandran	DMK	122,482	27.83	175,130	39.79
35	Sivakasi	V. Jayalakshmi	INC(R)	271,568	54.53	G. Ramanujam	INC(O)	156,720	31.47	114,848	23.06
36	Tirunelveli	V. Arunachalam	ADMK	304,562	69.82	K. M. Samsuddin	DMK	121,869	27.94	182,693	41.88
37	Tenkasi (SC)	M. Arunachalam	INC(R)	305,069	69.23	S. Rajagopalan	INC(O)	118,193	26.82	186,876	42.41
38	Tiruchendur	K. T. Kosalaram	INC(R)	272,338	61.08	Edwin Devadasan	INC(O)	152,148	34.13	120,190	26.95
39	Nagercoil	Kumari Ananthan	INC(O)	244,526	56.76	M. Moses	INC(R)	170,290	39.53	74,236	17.23

== Post-election Union Council of Ministers from Tamil Nadu ==
While there were no members from Tamil Nadu in Morarji Desai's Administration, Charan Singh appointed two AIADMK members to his cabinet, making it the first time a non-Congress Dravidian Party member making it to the council of ministers at the national level.

=== Cabinet Ministers (Charan Singh Administration) ===
Minister	Party	Constituency	Portfolios
Aravinda Bala Pajanor	AIADMK	Pondicherry	Minister of Petroleum, Chemicals and Fertilizers
Satyavani Muthu	AIADMK	Rajya Sabha	Minister of Social Welfare

== See also ==
- Elections in Tamil Nadu

== Bibliography ==
- Volume I, 1977 Indian general election, 6th Lok Sabha
