= 1996 Indian general election in Tamil Nadu =

Indian general election in Tamil Nadu, 1996
- 27 April 1996 and 2 May 1996

39 (of 543) seats in the Lok Sabha
- Registered: 42,488,022
- Turnout: 28,438,885 (66.93%) ▲3.01%
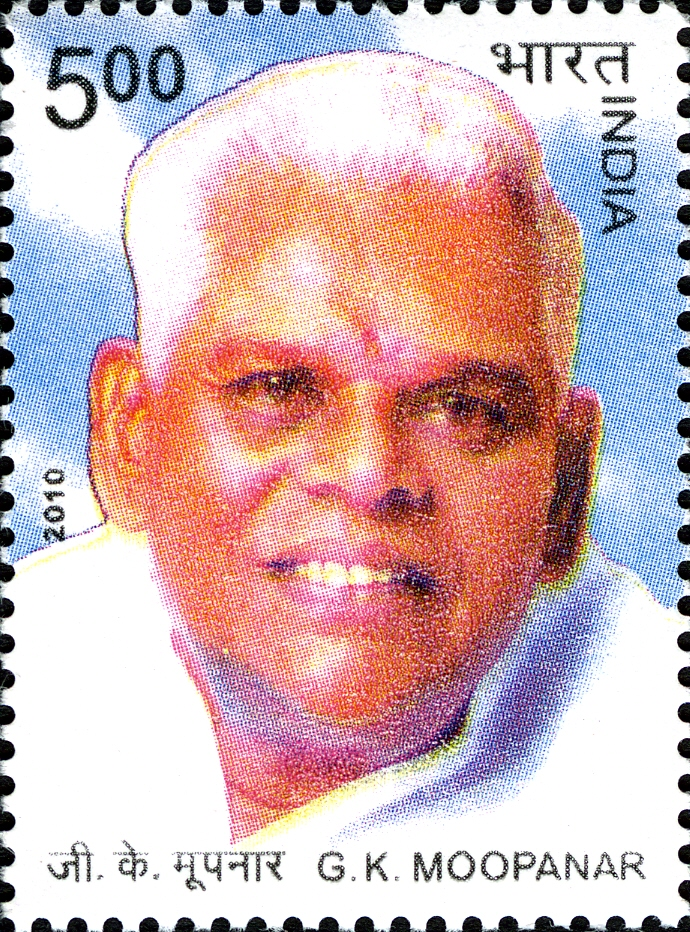

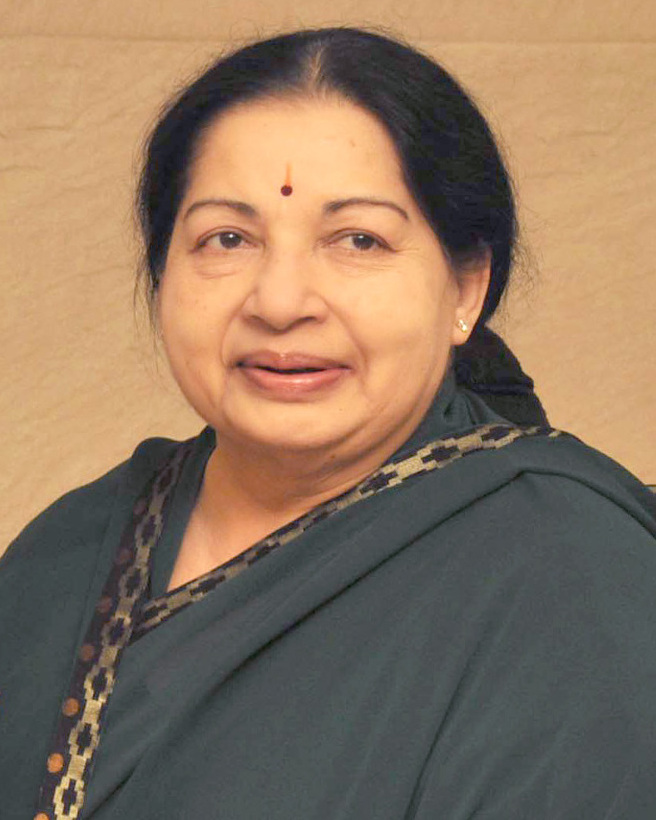
	First party	Second party
Leader	G. K. Moopanar	J. Jayalalithaa
Party	TMC(M)	AIADMK
Alliance	United Front	Congress alliance
Leader's seat	Did not contest	Did not contest
Seats won	39	0
Seat change	▲39	▼39
Popular vote	14,940,474	7,095,650
Percentage	54.96%	26.10%
Swing	▲30.23%	▼34.57%
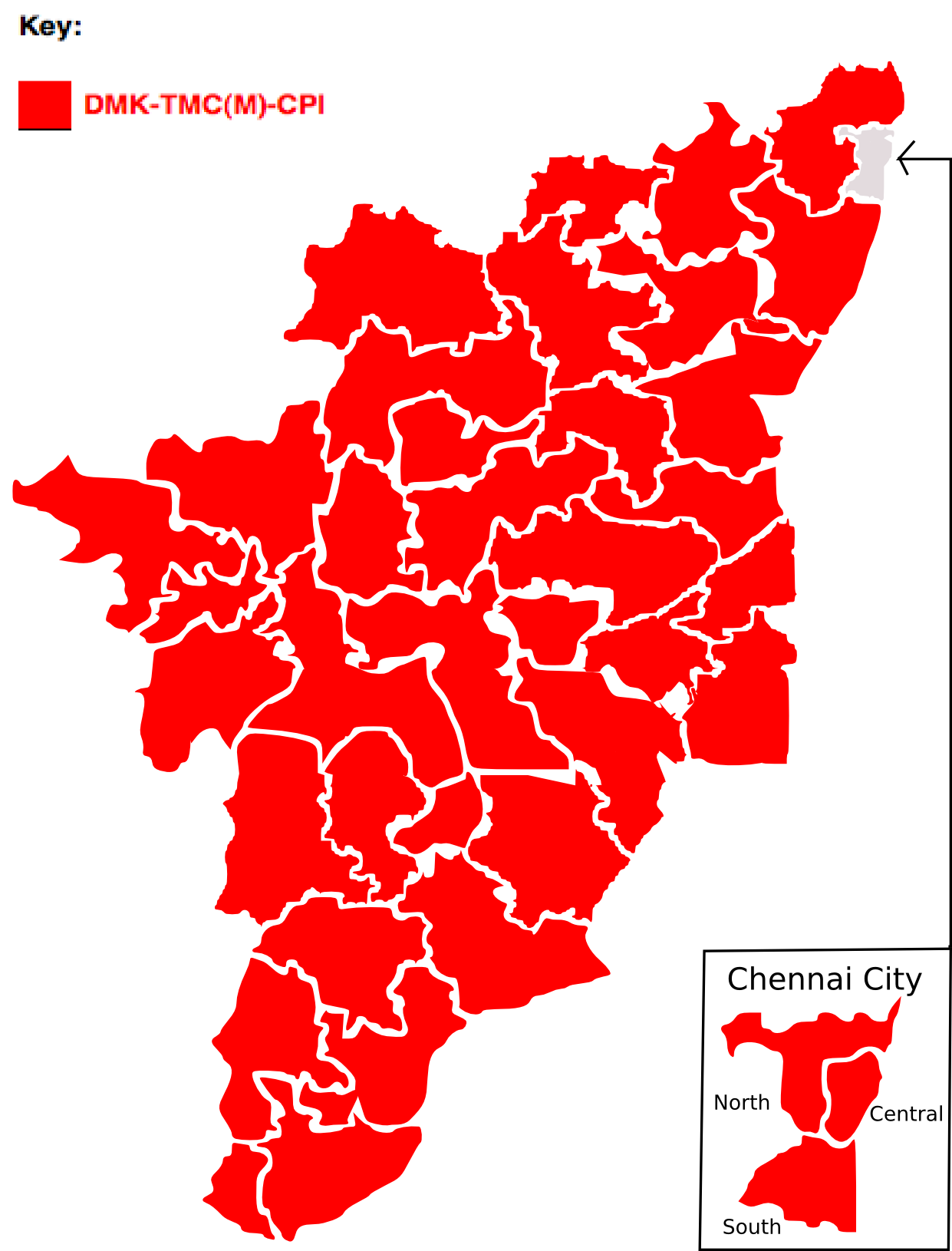
- 1996 Election map (by constituencies); Red = United Front (won all the seats)

- Seat wise Result
Prime Minister before election
P. V. Narasimha Rao
INC
Prime Minister after election
Atal Bihari Vajpayee
BJP

The 1996 Indian general election polls in Tamil Nadu were held for 39 seats in the state. The result was a landslide for the newly formed alliance between Dravida Munnetra Kazhagam (DMK), Tamil Maanila Congress (TMC) and its leader G. K. Moopanar, and the left parties who ended up getting all 39 seats. Post election, the newly formed United Front, ended up getting all the seats from Tamil Nadu, since DMK and TMC joined it, with outside support from Indian National Congress (INC). The results in Tamil Nadu is a reflection of the results nationally, where INC, ended up losing the most seats. This election was seen as redemption for Moopanar and TMC, since they left Congress, on grounds that they formed an alliance with AIADMK, even though J. Jayalalithaa, general secretary of AIADMK, was accused of many corruption charges. This led to a disastrous showing, for AIADMK and Congress in Tamil Nadu, since they lost all 39 seats from the last election, and TMC reaping the benefits by getting the most seats, in this election with 20 seats.

== Election Schedule ==
Poll event	Phases	
Poll event	I	II
Notification date	27 March 1996	
Last date for filing nomination	3 April 1996	
Scrutiny of nomination	4 April 1996	
Last date for withdrawal of nomination	6 April 1996	
Date of poll	27 April 1996	2 May 1996
Number of constituencies	25	14
Date of counting of votes	8 May 1996	
Date of completion of electoral process	14 May 2026	

Voting Phases
I (25 seats)	II (14 seats)
Tindivanam; Cuddalore; Chidambaram; Rasipuram; Nilgiris; Coimbatore; Pollachi; Palani; Dindigul; Periyakulam; Madurai; Karur; Tiruchirappalli; Perambalur; Mayiladuthurai; Nagapattinam; Thanjavur; Pudukkottai; Sivaganga; Ramanathapuram; Sivakasi; Tirunelveli; Tenkasi; Tiruchendur; Nagercoil	Chennai North; Chennai Central; Chennai South; Sriperumbudur; Chengalpattu; Arakkonam; Vellore; Tiruppattur; Vandavasi; Dharmapuri; Krishnagiri; Salem; Tiruchengode; Gobichettipalayam

== Seat allotments ==
=== United Front ===
DMK-led Alliance
Party	Flag	Symbol	Leader	Seats
Tamil Maanila Congress			G. K. Moopanar	20
Dravida Munnetra Kazhagam			M. Karunanidhi	17
Communist Party of India			R. Nallakannu	2
Total				39

=== Congress Front ===
AIADMK-led Alliance
Party	Flag	Symbol	Leader	Seats	
Indian National Congress			P. V. Narasimha Rao	28	29
United Communist Party of India			D. Pandian	1	29
All India Anna Dravida Munnetra Kazhagam			J. Jayalalithaa	10	
Total				39	

=== People's Democratic Front ===
People's Democratic Front
Party	Flag	Symbol	Leader	Seats	
Marumalarchi Dravida Munnetra Kazhagam			Vaiko	23	24
Samajwadi Party (Note: ECI had allotted cycle symbol to TMC, so it had contested on MDMK symbol.)			Mulayam Singh Yadav	1	24
Janata Dal			Ram Vilas Paswan	8	
Communist Party of India (Marxist)			N. Sankaraiah	7	
Total				232	

=== PMK-Tiwari Congress Front ===
PMK-led Alliance
Party	Flag	Symbol	Leader	Seats
Pattali Makkal Katchi			Dr. Ramdoss	15
All India Indira Congress (Tiwari)			Vazhappady Ramamurthy	12
Total				27

== List of Candidates ==
Constituency		DMK+		AIADMK+		MDMK+	
#	Name	Party	Candidate	Party	Candidate	Party	Candidate
1	Madras North	DMK	N. V. N. Somu	INC	D. Pandian (Note: United Communist Party of Indua contested on the "Hand" symbol of the Indian National Congress (INC), and is officially recorded as a INC candidate in electoral records.)	CPI(M)	W. R. Varada Rajan
2	Madras Central	DMK	Murasoli Maran	INC	G. K. J. Bharathi	MDMK	Prof. S. Krishnasamy
3	Madras South	DMK	T. R. Baalu	ADMK	H. Ganesham	MDMK	R. Senguttuvan
4	Sriperumbudur (SC)	DMK	T. Nagaratnam	INC	Lata Priyakumar	MDMK	Kavinger Kudiyarasu
5	Chengalpattu	DMK	K. Parasuraman	INC	S. M. Krishnan	MDMK	C. Arumugam
6	Arakkonam	TMC	A. M. Velu	INC	R. Raviram	JD	Jayakaran Joseph
7	Vellore	DMK	P. Shanmugam	INC	B. Akber Pasha	JD	R. Abdul Hakim
8	Tiruppattur	DMK	D. Venugopal	INC	Era. Anbarasu	MDMK	G. Vanagamudi
9	Vandavasi	TMC	L. Balaraman	INC	M. Krishnasamy	MDMK	A. Chinnadurai
10	Tindivanam	DMK	G. Venkatraman	INC	K. Ramamurthy	MDMK	D. Durai
11	Cuddalore	TMC	P. R. S. Venkatesan	INC	V. Santhamurthy	MDMK	R. T. Sabapathy Mohan
12	Chidambaram (SC)	DMK	C. V. Ganesan	INC	P. Vallalperuman	CPI(M)	P. S. Mahalingam
13	Dharmapuri	TMC	P. Theertharaman	INC	M. P. Subramaniam	MDMK	P. Krishnan
14	Krishnagiri	TMC	C. Narasimhan	INC	E. V. K. S. Elangovan	JD	G. A. Vadivelu
15	Rasipuram (SC)	TMC	K. Kandasamy	INC	K. Jayakumar	MDMK	V. Chakravarthi
16	Salem	TMC	R. Devadass	INC	K. V. Thangkabalu	MDMK	B. Mohanraj
17	Tiruchengode	DMK	K. P. Ramalingam	ADMK	A. V. Kumarasamy	MDMK	P. Balakrishnan
18	Nilgiris	TMC	Balasubramaniam	INC	R. Prabhu	JD	C. V. Kandasamy
19	Gobichettipalayam	DMK	V. P. Shanmugasundaram	ADMK	P. G. Narayanan	MDMK	B. Palanisamy
20	Coimbatore	DMK	M. Ramanathan	INC	C. K. Kuppuswamy	CPI(M)	P. R. Natarajan
21	Pollachi (SC)	TMC	V. Kandasamy	ADMK	R. Anna Nambi	JD	K. N. Rajan
22	Palani	TMC	S. K. Kharventhan	ADMK	P. Kumarasamy	MDMK	V. Ponniyin Selvan
23	Dindigul	TMC	N. S. V. Chitthan	ADMK	C. Sreenivasan	MDMK	S. Pasumponpandian
24	Madurai	TMC	A. G. S. Ram Babu	INC	V. K. Boominathan	CPI(M)	P. Mohan
25	Periyakulam	DMK	R. Gnanagurusamy	ADMK	R. Ramasamy	MDMK	N. Eramakrishnan
26	Karur	TMC	K. Natrayan	ADMK	M. Thambidurai	MDMK	T. P. Moorthy
27	Tiruchirappalli	TMC	L. Adaikalaraj	INC	K. Gopal	CPI(M)	T. K. Rangarajan
28	Perambalur (SC)	DMK	A. Raja	INC	P. V. Subramanian	MDMK	S. Durairajan
29	Mayiladuthurai	TMC	P. V. Rajendiran	INC	Mani Shankar Aiyar	MDMK	A. Venkatesan
30	Nagapattinam (SC)	CPI	M. Selvarasu	INC	M. Kannivannan	CPI(M)	V. Thambusamy
31	Thanjavur	DMK	S. S. Palanimanickam	INC	K. Thulasiah Vandayar	JD	A. Thanjai Ramamurthi
32	Pudukkottai	DMK	Tiruchi Siva	INC	V. N. Swaminathan	MDMK	R. Karthikeyan
33	Sivaganga	TMC	P. Chidambaram	INC	M. Gowri Shankaran	MDMK	A. Ganesan
34	Ramanathapuram	TMC	S. P. Udayappan	INC	V. Rajeshwaran	MDMK	R. Baluchamy
35	Sivakasi	CPI	V. Alagirisamy	ADMK	Sanjay Ramasamy	MDMK	Vaiko
36	Tirunelveli	DMK	Sivaprakasam	ADMK	A. R. Rajaselvam	MDMK	Shunmuga Chidambaram
37	Tenkasi (SC)	TMC	M. Arunachalam	INC	V. Selvaraj	CPI(M)	P. Jeyaraj
38	Tiruchendur	TMC	R. Dhanuskodi	INC	S. Justin	JD	Anton Gomez
39	Nagercoil	TMC	N. Dennis	INC	Kumari Ananthan	JD	P. Mohammad Ismail

== Voting and results ==
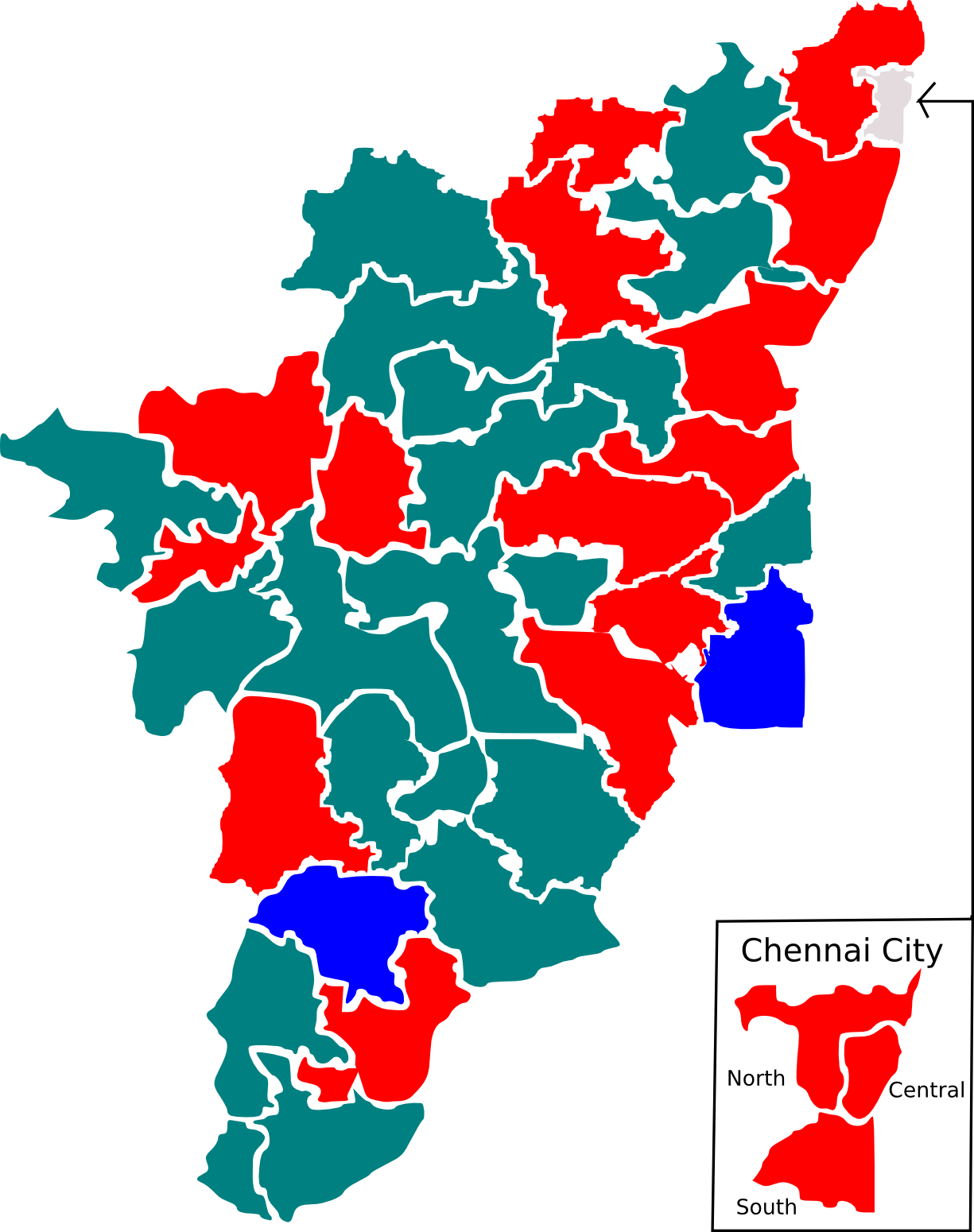
Election map of results based on parties. Colours are based on the results table on the left

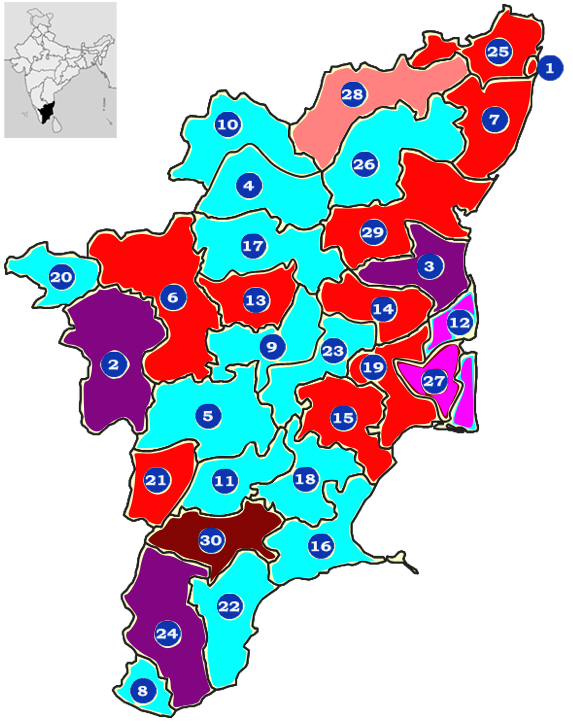
Election Map (Results reflected as %seats won by districts) DMK-TMC-CPI alliance won all the seats in Tamil Nadu and the following represent the breakdown: DMK won all the seats in this district TMC won all the seats in this district DMK won 67% of the seats in this district, while TMC got the rest DMK won 50% of the seats in this district, while TMC got the rest CPI won all of the seats in this district TMC won 50% of the seats in this district, while CPI got the rest

Alliance	Party	Popular Vote	Percentage	Swing	Seats won	Seat Change
United Front	Tamil Maanila Congress	7,339,982	27.00%	new party	20	new party
United Front	Dravida Munnetra Kazhagam	6,967,679	25.63%	▲2.94%	17	▲17
United Front	Communist Party of India	632,813	2.33%	▲0.29%	2	▲2
United Front	Total	14,940,474	54.96%	▲30.23%	39	▲39
AIADMK+	Indian National Congress	4,965,364	18.26%	▼24.31%	0	▼28
AIADMK+	All India Anna Dravida Munnetra Kazhagam	2,130,286	7.84%	▼10.26%	0	▼11
AIADMK+	Total	7,095,650	26.10%	▼34.57%	0	▼39
MDMK+	Marumalarchi Dravida Munnetra Kazhagam	1,222,415	4.50%	new party	0	new party
MDMK+	Communist Party of India (Marxist)	632,813	2.33%	▲0.29%	0	Steady
MDMK+	Janata Dal	415,287	1.53%	▼1.38%	0	Steady
MDMK+	Total	2,270,515	8.36%	▲3.41%	0	Steady
PMK+	All India Indira Congress (Tiwari)	605,565	2.23%	new party	0	new party
PMK+	Pattali Makkal Katchi	552,118	2.03%	▼3.09%	0	Steady
PMK+	Total	1,157,683	4.26%	▼0.86%	0	Steady
Independents		815,224	3.00%	▲1.57%	0	Steady
Other Parties (14 parties)		909,395	3.32%	▲0.22%	0	Steady
Total		27,188,941	100.00%	Steady	39	Steady
Valid Votes		27,188,941	95.60%			
Invalid Votes		1,249,944	4.40%			
Total Votes		28,438,885	100.00%			
Registered Voters/Turnout		42,488,022	66.93%	▲3.01%		

Note: TMC(M) is a spliter-group of INC, who carried with them 6 incumbent MPs from previous election
‡: Vote % reflects the percentage of votes the party received compared to the entire electorate that voted in this election. Adjusted (Adj.) Vote %, reflects the average % of votes the party received per constituency that they contested.
Sources: Election Commission of India

== List of Elected MPs ==
Constituency		Winner				Runner Up				Margin	%
#	Name	Candidate	Party	Votes	%	Candidate	Party	Votes	%	Margin	%
1	Madras North	N. V. N. Somu	DMK	559,048	66.11	D. Pandian	INC	169,431	20.04	389,617	46.07
2	Madras Central	Murasoli Maran	DMK	403,867	69.02	G. K. J. Bharathi	INC	123,400	21.09	280,467	47.93
3	Madras South	T. R. Baalu	DMK	538,697	61.97	H. Ganesham	ADMK	199,516	22.95	339,181	39.02
4	Sriperumbudur (SC)	T. Nagaratnam	DMK	431,919	57.94	Lata Priyakumar	INC	186,208	24.98	245,711	32.96
5	Chengalpattu	K. Parasuraman	DMK	410,483	58.07	S. M. Krishnan	INC	174,826	24.73	235,657	33.34
6	Arakkonam	A. M. Velu	TMC	425,974	59.05	R. Raviram	INC	161,129	22.34	264,845	36.71
7	Vellore	P. Shanmugam	DMK	391,141	57.52	B. Akber Pasha	INC	180,106	26.49	211,035	31.03
8	Tiruppattur	D. Venugopal	DMK	430,766	61.55	R. Anbarasu	INC	190,502	27.22	240,264	34.33
9	Vandavasi	L. Balaraman	TMC	342,184	50.34	M. Krishnaswamy	INC	168,880	24.84	173,304	25.50
10	Tindivanam	G. Venkatraman	DMK	367,308	53.29	K. Ramamurthee	INC	177,032	25.69	190,276	27.60
11	Cuddalore	P. R. S. Venkatesan	TMC	389,660	56.20	V. Santhamurthy	INC	184,456	26.60	205,204	29.60
12	Chidambaram (SC)	V. Ganesan	DMK	336,164	48.69	R. Elumalai	PMK	159,898	23.16	176,266	25.53
13	Dharmapuri	P. Theertharaman	TMC	297,166	42.65	M. P. Subramaniyam	INC	165,920	23.82	131,246	18.83
14	Krishnagiri	C. Narasimhan	TMC	371,009	55.95	E. V. K. S. Elankovan	INC	176,333	26.59	194,676	29.36
15	Rasipuram (SC)	K. Kandasamy	TMC	408,791	61.76	K. Jayakumar	INC	215,613	32.57	193,178	29.19
16	Salem	R. Devadass	TMC	315,277	47.07	K. V. Thangkabalu	INC	194,392	29.02	120,885	18.05
17	Tiruchengode	K. P. Ramalingam	DMK	471,533	56.64	A. V. Kumarasamy	ADMK	278,345	33.44	193,188	23.20
18	Nilgiris	S. R. Balasubramaniyan	TMC	475,515	62.91	R. Prabhu	INC	194,139	25.68	281,376	37.23
19	Gobichettipalayam	V. P. Shanmugasundaram	DMK	353,982	53.20	P. G. Narayanan	ADMK	211,014	31.71	142,968	21.49
20	Coimbatore	M. Ramanathan	DMK	463,807	56.79	C. K. Kuppuswamy	INC	201,020	24.61	262,787	32.18
21	Pollachi (SC)	V. Kandasamy	TMC	361,743	55.18	R. Anna Nambi	ADMK	222,852	33.99	138,891	21.19
22	Palani	S. K. Kaarvendhan	TMC	405,782	57.43	P. Kumarasamy	ADMK	213,149	30.17	192,633	27.26
23	Dindigul	N. S. V. Chitthan	TMC	444,858	63.97	C. Sreenivaasan	ADMK	176,944	25.45	267,914	38.52
24	Madurai	A. G. S. Ram Babu	TMC	334,055	46.45	Subramanian Swamy	JP	144,249	20.06	189,806	26.39
25	Periyakulam	R. Gnanagurusamy	DMK	326,665	49.09	R. Ramasamy	ADMK	195,328	29.35	131,337	19.74
26	Karur	K. Natrayan	TMC	409,830	56.12	M. Thambidurai	ADMK	241,556	33.08	168,274	23.04
27	Tiruchirappalli	L. Adaikkalraj	TMC	434,149	62.65	K. Gopal	INC	169,441	24.45	264,708	38.20
28	Perambalur (SC)	A. Raja	DMK	399,079	59.19	P. V. Subramanian	INC	184,832	27.41	214,247	31.78
29	Mayiladuthurai	P. V. Rajendiran	TMC	367,778	55.70	Mani Shankar Aiyar	INC	214,234	32.45	153,544	23.25
30	Nagapattinam (SC)	M. Selvarasu	CPI	394,330	56.77	M. Kannivannan	INC	172,984	24.90	221,346	31.87
31	Thanjavur	S. S. Palanimanickam	DMK	390,010	58.80	K. Thulasiah Vandayar	INC	189,582	28.58	200,428	30.22
32	Pudukkottai	N. Siva	DMK	398,209	50.46	V. N. Swaminathan	INC	220,336	27.92	177,873	22.54
33	Sivaganga	P. Chidambaram	TMC	418,774	64.79	M. Gowrishankaran	INC	171,472	26.53	247,302	38.26
34	Ramanathapuram	S. P. Udayappan	TMC	331,249	53.02	V. Rajeshwaran	INC	135,945	21.76	195,304	31.26
35	Sivakasi	V. Alagirisamy	CPI	238,483	30.80	Sanjay Ramasamy	ADMK	214,861	27.75	23,622	3.05
36	Tirunelveli	D. S. A. Sivaprakasam	DMK	295,001	45.53	A. R. Rajaselvam	ADMK	176,721	27.27	118,280	18.26
37	Tenkasi (SC)	M. Arunachalam	TMC	290,663	44.98	V. Selvaraj	INC	194,737	30.14	95,926	14.84
38	Tiruchendur	R. Dhanuskodi Athithan	TMC	317,943	55.57	S. Justin	INC	114,232	19.97	203,711	35.60
39	Nagercoil	N. Dennis	TMC	197,582	35.18	P. Radhakrishnan	BJP	169,885	30.25	27,697	4.93

== Post-election Union Council of Ministers from Tamil Nadu ==
Source: Thinkquest Library

=== Cabinet Ministers ===
Minister	Party	Lok Sabha Constituency/Rajya Sabha	Portfolios
Murasoli Maran	DMK	Chennai Central	Minister of Commerce and Industry
G. Venkatraman	DMK	Tindivanam	Minister of Surface Transport
M. Arunachalam	TMC(M)	Tenkasi	Minister of Urban Development (few months); Minister of Labour
P. Chidambaram	TMC(M)	Sivaganga	Minister of Finance

=== Ministers of State ===
Minister	Party	Lok Sabha Constituency/Rajya Sabha	Portfolios
T.R. Baalu	DMK	Chennai South	Minister of Petroleum and Natural Gas
R. Dhanuskodi Athithan	TMC(M)	Tiruchendur	Minister of Youth Affairs & Sports
N. V. N. Somu	DMK	Chennai North	Minister of Defence

== See also ==
- Elections in Tamil Nadu
