= Ramalingam =

Ramalingam ராமலிங்கம்
- Pronunciation: Rāmaliṅkam
- Gender: Male
- Language: Tamil

Origin
- Region of origin: Southern India; North-eastern Sri Lanka

Other names
- Variant form: Ramalinga

Ramalingam (Tamil: ராமலிங்கம்) is a Tamil male given name. Due to the Tamil tradition of using patronymic surnames it may also be a surname for males and females.

== Notable people ==
=== Given name ===
- C. Ramalingam, Indian politician
- E. Ramalingam, Indian politician
- Goka Ramalingam, Indian politician
- K. P. Ramalingam, Indian politician
- K. V. Ramalingam, Indian politician
- Kudanthai N. Ramalingam (born 1944), Indian politician
- M. Ramalingam (born 1939), Indian critic
- P. S. Ramalingam (died 2013), Indian politician
- R. Ramalingam, Indian politician
- Raghu Ramalingam Ambadapudi, Indian television producer
- Ramalinga Swamigal (1823–1874), Indian saint and poet
- S. Ramalingam, Indian politician
- T. Ramalingam (born 1904), Ceylonese lawyer and politician
- T. A. Ramalingam Chettiar (1881–1952), Indian lawyer and politician
- Venkatarama Ramalingam Pillai (1888–1972), Indian poet
- W. V. V. B. Ramalingam (1884–1962), Indian activist

=== Surname ===
- Ramalingam Chandrasekar (born 1963), Sri Lankan politician
- Ramalingam Paramadeva (died 2004), Sri Lankan militant
- Tiruchengodu Ramalingam Sundaram (1907–1963), Indian actor
- Saravanan Michael Ramalingam (1971–1996), Singaporean murder victim.

== Other uses ==
- Gopal Ramalingam Memorial Engineering College, college in Chennai, Tamil Nadu
