= V. Govindasami Naidu =

Indian politician

Member-Tamil Nadu Legislative Assembly
- In office 1957–1962
- Preceded by: O. Chengam Pillai
- Succeeded by: T. P. Elumalai
- Constituency: Ponneri

Personal details
- Born: 29 February 1908
- Party: Indian National Congress
- Profession: Farmer

V. Govindasami Naidu was an Indian politician and a former member of the Tamil Nadu Legislative Assembly. He hailed from Pandeeswaram village in Tiruvallur district. He was educated at Madras Christian College. Belonging to the Indian National Congress party, he contested and won the election to the Tamil Nadu Legislative Assembly in 1957 from the Ponneri Assembly constituency and became a Member of the Legislative Assembly.

== Electoral Performance ==
=== 1957 ===
1957 Madras Legislative Assembly election: Ponneri
Party	Candidate	Votes	%	±%
INC	V. Govindasami Naidu	32,119	25.94%	+7.83
INC	T. P. Elumalai	31,392	25.35%	+7.25
Independent	T. Shanmugam	14,995	12.11%	New
Independent	Changam Pillai	13,639	11.01%	New
Independent	M. Jayaram Reddi	10,873	8.78%	New
CPI	C. K. Manickam	8,306	6.71%	New
Independent	M. Kuppuswami	4,872	3.93%	New
Independent	Elimalai S/O Palayam	4,570	3.69%	New
Independent	Thirvenkata Naicker	3,069	2.48%	New
Margin of victory		727	0.59%	−1.29%
Turnout		1,23,835	72.43%	−1.01%
Registered electors		1,70,967		
INC gain from KMPP		Swing	-1.73%	
