= Maragatham Chandrasekar =

Indian politician (1917–2001)

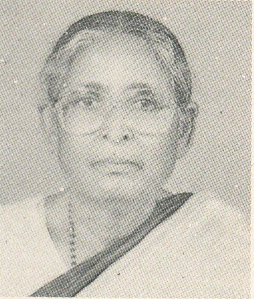

Member of Parliament, Rajya Sabha
- In office 27 September 1982 – 26 September 1984
- In office 3 April 1970 – 2 April 1982
- Constituency: Nominated

Member of Parliament, Lok Sabha
- In office 1984–1996
- Prime Minister: Rajiv Gandhi; V. P. Singh; Chandra Shekhar; P. V. Narasimha Rao
- Preceded by: T. Nagaratnam
- Succeeded by: T. Nagaratnam
- Constituency: Sriperumbudur
- In office 1962–1967
- Prime Minister: Pandit Jawaharlal Nehru; Lal Bahadur Shastri; Indira Gandhi
- Preceded by: None
- Succeeded by: K. Subravelu
- Constituency: Mayuram
- In office 1951–1957
- Prime Minister: Pandit Jawaharlal Nehru
- Preceded by: None
- Succeeded by: R. Govindarajulu Naidu
- Constituency: Thiruvallur

Personal details
- Born: 11 November 1917
- Died: 26 October 2001 (aged 83)
- Party: Indian National Congress
- Spouse: R. Chandrasekar
- Profession: Politician

Maragatham Chandrasekhar (11 November 1917 – 26 October 2001) was an Indian politician and member of parliament from the Indian state of Tamil Nadu.

== Personal life ==
Maragatham Chandrasekhar was born Maragatham Muniswami to Vidwan Kalathur Muniswami on 11 November 1917. She obtained her Bachelor of Science degree in India and completed diplomas in free-lance, domestic science and dietetics courses in London. She also did a course on Specialized Institution Management and Administration at London. Maragatham married R. Chandrasekhar and had a son (Lalit Chandrasekhar) and a daughter, Lata Priyakumar who also served as a Member of the Legislative Assembly of Tamil Nadu.

== Politics ==
Maragatham joined the Indian National Congress and was elected to the Lok Sabha from Tiruvallur in the 1952 parliamentary elections. She served as the Member of Lok Sabha for Tiruvallur from 1952 to 1957 and Member of the Rajya Sabha from 1970 to 1988. She served as the Union Deputy Minister for Health from 1952 to 1957, Home Affairs from 1962 to 1964 and Social Welfare from 1964 to 1967. In 1972, Maragatham was elected General Secretary of the All India Congress Committee. She was governor of Punjab state.

== Assassination of Rajiv Gandhi ==
As former Member of Parliament from Sriperumbudur, Maragatham hosted the former Indian Prime Minister Rajiv Gandhi during his visit to Sriperumbudur in 1991. She was present at the rally in Sriperumbudur where Rajiv Gandhi was assassinated.

== Death ==
Maragatham died after a brief illness on 26 October 2001.

== See also ==
- Assassination of Rajiv Gandhi

== Notes ==
Lok Sabha
New parliament	Member of Parliament for Tiruvallur; 1952 – 1957	Succeeded by R. Govindarajulu Naidu
Preceded by	Member of Parliament for Mayuram; 1962 – 1967	Succeeded by K. Subravelu
Rajya Sabha
Preceded by	Member of Parliament nominated by the President; 1970 – 1982	Succeeded by
Preceded by	Member of Parliament nominated by the President; 1982 - 1984	Succeeded by
Lok Sabha
Preceded by T. Nagaratnam	Member of Parliamentfor Sriperumbudur; 1984 – 1996	Succeeded by T. Nagaratnam
Political offices
Preceded by	Deputy Minister in the Ministry of Home Affairs; 8 May 1962 - 9 June 1964; With: Lalit Narayan Mishra	Succeeded by Lalit Narayan Mishra
Preceded by	Deputy Minister in the Department of Social Welfare; 24 January 1966 -13 March 1967	Succeeded by
Preceded by Sheila Kaul (MoS, I/C)	Minister of State (Independent Charge) of Women and Social Welfare; 31 December 1984 - 25 September 1985	Succeeded by Rajendra Kumari Bajpai (MoS, I/C) (Renamed as Welfare)
