= K. S. Ramaswamy =

Indian politician

K. S. Ramaswamy Gounder

Union Deputy Minister for Home, Education and Social Welfare
- In office 1967–1972
- Prime Minister: Indira Gandhi

Member of Parliament (Lok Sabha)
- In office 1957–1962
- Succeeded by: P. G. Karuthiruman
- Constituency: Gobichettipalayam

Member of Parliament (Rajya Sabha)
- In office 1962–1974

Member of Parliament (Lok Sabha)
- In office 1977–1980
- Preceded by: P. A. Saminathan
- Succeeded by: C.Chinnaswamy
- Constituency: Gobichettipalayam

Personal details
- Born: 1922 Kugalur, Gobichettipalayam, Madras, British India
- Died: 4 December 2004 (aged 82) Gobichettipalayam, Tamil Nadu, India
- Party: Indian National Congress
- Profession: Lawyer, activist, freedom fighter

K. S. Ramaswamy Gounder (Tamil: ராமசாமி கவுண்டர்) (1922 – 4 December 2004) was an Indian politician and former Member of Parliament elected from Tamil Nadu. He was elected to the Lok Sabha from Gobichettipalayam constituency as an Indian National Congress candidate in 1957 and 1977 election. He was the union deputy minister for Home, Education and Social Welfare in Indira Gandhi's ministry. He is the son of the freedom fighter K.K Subbanna Gounder. He was appointed President of Tamil Nadu Congress Committee. He was awarded Chevalier and Sir.

== Political life ==
Ramaswamy was a Member of the Second and Sixth Lok Sabhas from 1957 to 1962 and 1977 to 1979, representing the Gobichettipalayam constituency of Tamil Nadu. Ramaswamy was also a Member of Rajya Sabha from 1962 to 1974, representing the State of Tamil Nadu. An able administrator, he served as a Union Deputy Minister in the Ministries of Home Affairs and Education and Social Welfare from 1967 to 1971 and 1971 to 1972 respectively.

An active parliamentarian, Ramaswamy was a member of the Estimates Committee from 1961 to 1962 and the Joint Committee on Salaries and Allowances of Members of Parliament during the Sixth Lok Sabha from 1977 to 1979.

== Other works ==
An agriculturist, advocate and industrialist by profession, Ramaswamy was associated with several social, religious and educational organisations. He was a member of the Delhi Zoological Park Council and the Indian Central Sugarcane Committee from 1960 to 1962; Coffee Board of India in 1966 and Correspondent, Gandhi Kalvi Nilayam High School for many years. He was instrumental in setting up the Gobi Arts and Science College in Gobichettipalayam. He was also associated with the Avinashilingam Institute for Home Science and Higher Education for Women for some years.

A widely travelled person, he headed the Indian Olympic Contingent to the 1972 Munich Olympics. His followers have named an area in Chennai as Chevalier KSR Nagar.

== Awards ==
- Chevalier
- Sir
