= Tiruvallur Lok Sabha constituency =

Parliamentary constituency in Tamil Nadu, India

Coordinates: 13.1°N 79.9°E

Thiruvallur
- Lok Sabha constituency
- Interactive map of Tiruvallur Loksabha constituency, post-2008 delimitation

Constituency details
- Country: India
- Region: South India
- State: Tamil Nadu
- Assembly constituencies: Gummidipoondi; Ponneri; Thiruvallur; Poonamallee; Avadi; Madavaram
- Established: 1951
- Total electors: 21,04,020
- Reservation: SC

Member of Parliament
- 18th Lok Sabha
- Incumbent Sasikanth Senthil
- Party: Indian National Congress
- Alliance: INDIA
- Elected year: 2024

Thiruvallur Lok Sabha constituency is a newly formed Lok Sabha (Parliament of India) constituency after the 2008 delimitation. Its Tamil Nadu Parliamentary Constituency number is 1 of 39. It was formed after merging the assembly segments of Gummidipoondi, Ponneri (SC), Tiruvallur, and Poonamallee (SC), Madhavaram, which were earlier parts of Sriperumbudur constituency and the newly formed Avadi.

The constituency had previously existed for three elections from 1951 to 1962.

It is reserved for Scheduled Castes (SC).

== Assembly segments ==
=== 2009-present ===
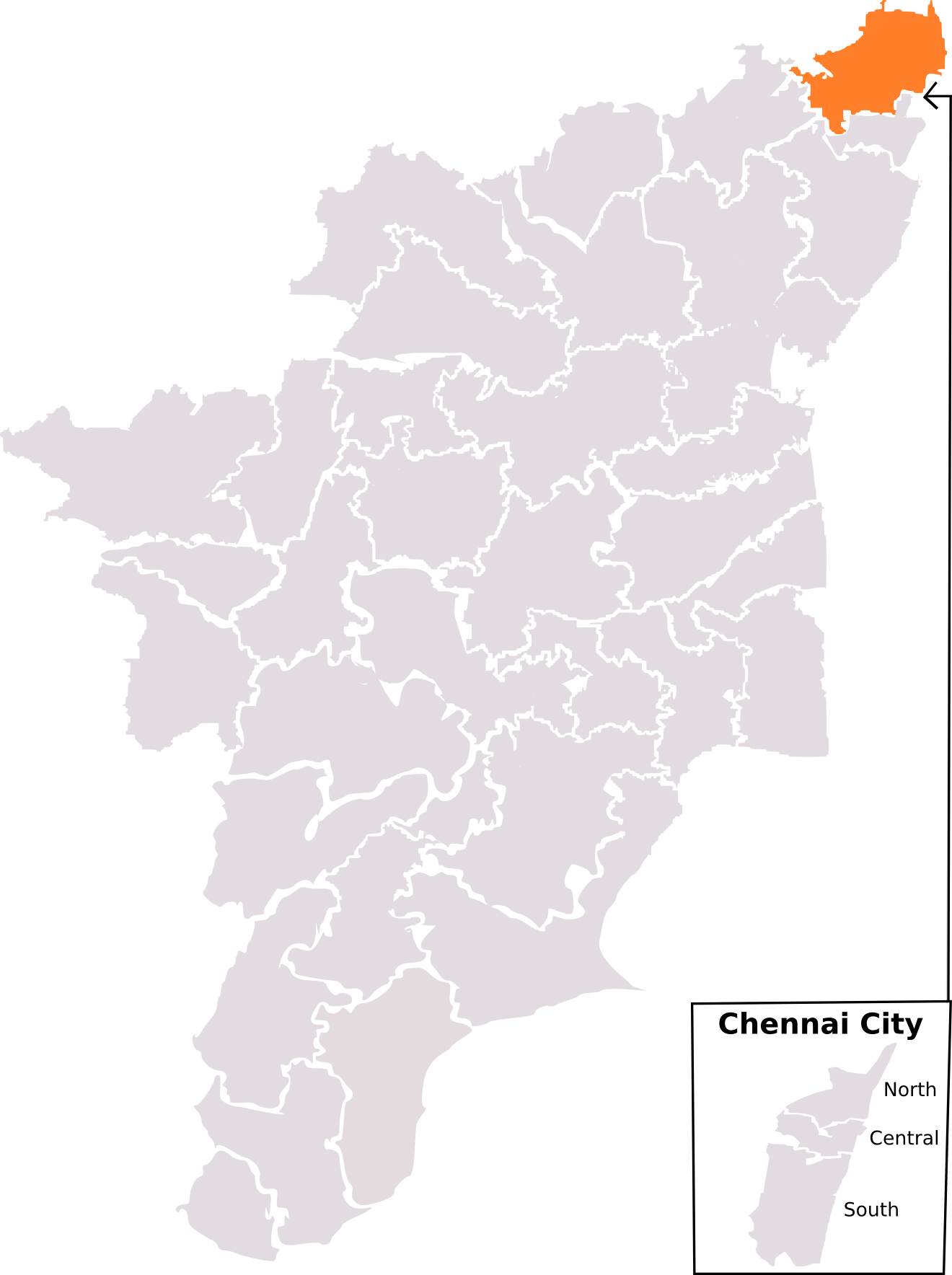
Tiruvallur constituency as laid out by 2008 Delimitation

Constituency number	Name	Reserved for (SC/ST/None)	District	Party	2024 Lead
1	Gummidipoondi	None	Thiruvallur	TVK	INC
2	Ponneri	SC	Thiruvallur	TVK	INC
4	Thiruvallur	None	Thiruvallur	TVK	INC
5	Poonamallee	SC	Thiruvallur	TVK	INC
6	Avadi	None	Thiruvallur	TVK	INC
9	Madavaram	None	Chennai	TVK	INC

== Members of Parliament ==
Year	Member	Party
1952	Maragatham Chandrasekhar	Indian National Congress
1957	R. Govindarajulu Naidu	Indian National Congress
1962	R. Govindarajulu Naidu	Indian National Congress
1967-2009 : Constituency did not exist
2009	Ponnusamy Venugopal	All India Anna Dravida Munnetra Kazhagam
2014	Ponnusamy Venugopal	All India Anna Dravida Munnetra Kazhagam
2019	K. Jeyakumar	Indian National Congress
2024	Sasikanth Senthil	Indian National Congress

== Election results ==
Vote share of Winning candidates
2024	56.21%
2019	54.48%
2014	50.10%
2009	43.37%
1962	47.92%
1957	64.90%
1951	17.89%

=== General Elections 2024 ===
2024 Indian general election: Tiruvallur
Party	Candidate	Votes	%	±%
INC	Sasikanth Senthil	796,956	56.21	▲1.53
BJP	Pon. V. Balaganapathy	224,801	15.86	New entry
DMDK	K. Nalla Thambi	223,904	15.79	New entry
NOTA	None of the above	18,978	1.34	▲0.03
Margin of victory		572,155	40.35	▲14.91
Turnout		1,417,812	68.59	▼3.49
Registered electors		20,85,991		
INC hold		Swing		

=== General Elections 2019 ===
2019 Indian general election: Tiruvallur
Party	Candidate	Votes	%	±%
INC	Dr. K. Jeyakumar	767,292	54.68	51.10
AIADMK	Dr. P. Venugopal	4,10,337	29.24	−21.82
MNM	M. Logarangan	73,731	5.25	
Independent	Pon. Raja	33,944	2.42	
NOTA	None Of The Above	18,275	1.30	−0.61
BSP	R. Anbuchezhian	15,187	1.08	0.18
Margin of victory		3,56,955	25.44	−0.84
Turnout		14,03,349	72.08	−0.20
Registered electors		19,46,870		14.33
INC gain from AIADMK		Swing	3.61	

=== General Elections 2014 ===
2014 Indian general election: Tiruvallur
Party	Candidate	Votes	%	±%
AIADMK	Dr. P. Venugopal	628,499	51.06	7.69
VCK	Ravikumar	3,05,069	24.79	
DMDK	V. Yuvaraj	2,04,734	16.63	3.63
INC	M. Jayakumar	43,960	3.57	
NOTA	None Of The Above	23,598	1.92	
CPI	A. S. Kannan	13,794	1.12	
BSP	C. Sathyamurthy	11,137	0.90	−0.36
AAP	B. Balamurugan	8,260	0.67	
Margin of victory		3,23,430	26.28	22.55
Turnout		12,30,842	72.28	1.77
Registered electors		17,02,833		41.41
AIADMK hold		Swing	7.69	

=== General Elections 2009 ===
2009 Indian general election: Tiruvallur
Party	Candidate	Votes	%	±%
AIADMK	Dr. P. Venugopal	368,294	43.37	
DMK	S. Gayathri	3,36,621	39.64	
DMDK	R. Suresh	1,10,452	13.01	
BSP	P. Anandan	10,746	1.27	
Margin of victory		31,673	3.73	
Turnout		12,04,209	70.51	
Rejected ballots		105	0.01	
AIADMK win (new seat)				

=== General Elections 1962 ===
1962 Indian general election: Tiruvallur
Party	Candidate	Votes	%	±%
INC	V. Govindaswamy Naidu	157,343	47.92	−16.99
DMK	M. Gopal	1,43,908	43.83	
Independent	P. Sulochana Mudaliar	13,766	4.19	
Independent	K. Arunmugha Mudaliar	13,344	4.06	
Margin of victory		13,435	4.09	−25.72
Turnout		3,28,361	70.51	24.72
Registered electors		4,84,018		19.50
INC hold		Swing	-16.99	

=== General Elections 1957 ===
1957 Indian general election: Tiruvallur
Party	Candidate	Votes	%	±%
INC	R. Govindarajulu Naidu	120,363	64.90	47.01
Independent	A. Raghava Reddy	65,083	35.10	
Margin of victory		55,280	29.81	26.58
Turnout		1,85,446	45.79	−41.62
Registered electors		4,05,032		−42.55
INC hold		Swing	47.01	

=== General Elections 1951 ===
1951–52 Indian general election: Tiruvallur
Party	Candidate	Votes	%	±%
INC	Maragatham Chandrasekar	110,265	17.89	17.89
INC	P. Natesan	90,340	14.66	14.66
Independent	Guruswami	80,985	13.14	
KMPP	Sarojini Rajah	66,450	10.78	
Independent	James Ford	57,215	9.28	
RPI	N. Sivaraj	54,077	8.78	
Independent	J. Madana Raj	42,960	6.97	
Independent	K. Ramalingam	40,745	6.61	
KLP	Nagaraja Sarma	21,436	3.48	
AIFB	Padmanabha Naidu	18,061	2.93	
Independent	Subba Rathnam	17,715	2.87	
Margin of victory		19,925	3.23	
Turnout		6,16,210	87.41	
Registered electors		7,04,970		0.00
INC win (new seat)				
