= M. S. Ravi =

Indian politician (born 1959)

Dr. M. Shanmugam Ravi (born 1959) is an Indian politician from Tamil Nadu. He is a member of the Tamil Nadu Legislative Assembly from Ponneri Assembly constituency which is reserved for Scheduled Caste community in Tiruvallur district, representing Tamilaga Vettri Kazhagam.

== Early life and education ==
Ravi is from Royapuram, Chennai. He is the son of Shanmugam and is a doctor by profession. He completed his MBBS in 1982 at University of Madras and later did his specialisation, DM in Cardiology, also at University of Madras in 1990.

== Career ==
Ravi became an MLA for the first time winning the 2026 Tamil Nadu Legislative Assembly election from Ponneri Assembly constituency representing Tamilaga Vettri Kazhagam. He polled 110439 votes and defeated his nearest rival, Durai Chandrasekar of the Indian National Congress, by a margin of 55,768 votes.
