= Sasikanth Senthil =

Indian politician

Member of Parliament, Lok Sabha
- Incumbent
- Assumed office 4 June 2024
- Preceded by: K. Jeyakumar
- Constituency: Tiruvallur

Personal details
- Born: 28 March 1979 (age 47)
- Party: Indian National Congress
- Education: National Institute of Technology, Tiruchirappalli
- Occupation: Politician

Sasikanth Senthil is an Indian politician and former Indian Administrative Service (IAS) officer who serves as a Member of Parliament representing the Tiruvallur Lok Sabha constituency. Senthil served in various administrative positions in the Government of Karnataka from 2009 to 2019, after which he resigned and subsequently joined the Congress party in 2020.

== Early life ==
Senthil was born into a Dalit family to Justice P Shanmugham, a District judge and Mrs. Ambica Shanmugham, a retired Central Government Officer. He completed his engineering degree in Electronics and Communication at National Institute of Technology, Tiruchirappalli and later worked at a private software company.

== IAS career ==
Senthil was the topper from Tamil Nadu in the 2008 Union Public Service Commission (UPSC) exams and ranked ninth position at the national level. He began his civil service career in 2009 and was assigned to the Karnataka cadre.

From 2009 to 2012, Senthil worked as the Assistant Commissioner in Ballari. He served two terms as the chief executive officer of the Shivamogga Zilla Panchayat. Later, he took charge as the Deputy Commissioner in the districts of Chitradurga and Raichur. From 2016, he worked as the Director in the Department of Mines and Geology. Since June 2017, Senthil held the position of Deputy Commissioner in the Dakshina Kannada district.

Senthil resigned from administrative services in September 2019, expressing disappointment with the state of democracy in the country.

== Political career ==
Senthil joined Congress in November 2020 and campaigned for the party in the 2021 Tamil Nadu Legislative Assembly election. Senthil was credited with the Congress party's victory in the 2023 Karnataka Legislative Assembly election, during which he led the campaign against the BJP.

In the 2024 Indian general election, Senthil was elected to parliament from the Tiruvallur Lok Sabha constituency, a Scheduled Caste reserved constituency in Tamil Nadu by more than 5.5 lakh votes, the highest margin in the state.

== Elections contested ==
Elections	Constituency	Party	Result	Votes	% Vote's	Opposition		
Elections	Constituency	Party	Result	Votes	% Vote's	Candidate	Party	Vote %
General Elections, 2024	Tiruvallur	INC	Won	7,96,956	55.53 %	V. Pon Balaganapathy	BJP	15.66 %

== See also ==
- 18th Lok Sabha
