= N. R. Govindarajar =

Indian politician

N R Govindarajar an Indian politician from All India Anna Dravida Munnetra Kazhagam and a previous member of the Parliament of India representing Tamil Nadu in the Rajya Sabha, the upper house of the Indian Parliament. He contested the 2004 Indian General Elections from Gobichettipalayam (Lok Sabha constituency) and lost to E. V. K. S. Elangovan.

== Election results ==
General Election, 2004: Gobichettipalayam
| Party | Candidate | Votes | % | ±% |
|---|---|---|---|---|
| INC | E. V. K. S. Elangovan | 426,826 | 62.75 | n/a |
| AIADMK | Govindarajar, N. R. | 212,349 | 31.22 | −15.33 |
| Independent | Shaik Muhaideen, S. | 15,356 | 2.26 | n/a |
| Majority | | 214,477 | 31.53 | +26.86 |
| Turnout | | 680,240 | 64.64 | +4.36 |
| INC gain from AIADMK | | Swing | +62.75 | |
