= P. Nagalingam =

Indian politician

P. Nagalingam was an Indian politician and former Member of the Legislative Assembly of Tamil Nadu. He was elected to the Tamil Nadu legislative assembly from Ponneri constituency as a Dravida Munnetra Kazhagam candidate in 1967, and 1971 elections.
