= R. Kolanthaivelu =

Indian politician

MP of Lok Sabha for Tamil Nadu
- Incumbent
- Assumed office 1977
- Constituency: Tamil Nadu

Personal details
- Born: 1935 Tiruchengodu
- Party: AIADMK
- Spouse: Rathinam
- Children: Sudha
- Parent: Ramaswamy Gounder (father)

Ramaswamy Gounder Kolanthaivelu (Tamil: ஆர் குழந்தைவேலு) (1935 – unknown) was an Indian politician and former Member of Parliament elected from Tamil Nadu. He was elected to the Lok Sabha as an Anna Dravida Munnetra Kazhagam candidate from Tiruchengode constituency in 1977 election. He went to Loyala College, Presidency College, Pachaiyappa's College for his higher education. He married Rathinam in 1973. He was a Lawyer and agriculturist by profession.
