= Durai Chandrasekar =

Indian politician

Member of the Tamil Nadu Legislative Assembly
- Incumbent
- Assumed office 12 May 2021
- Preceded by: P. Balaraman
- Constituency: Ponneri

Personal details
- Party: Indian National Congress
- Spouse: C. Subashini
- Children: C. Sachin Duraisamy; C. Jothsana
- Parent: M. Durai (father)
- Education: Dr. Ambedkar Government Law College, Chennai; Sir Theagaraya College
- Occupation: Advocate
- Profession: Lawyer

Durai Chandrasekar is an Indian politician who is a Member of Legislative Assembly of Tamil Nadu. He was elected from Ponneri as an Indian National Congress candidate in 2021.

== Electoral performance ==
2021 Tamil Nadu Legislative Assembly election : Ponneri
Party	Candidate	Votes	%	±%
INC	Durai Chandrasekar	94,528	45.27%	New
AIADMK	P. Balaraman	84,839	40.63%	▼7.93
MNM	D. Desingurajan	5,394	2.58%	New
AMMK	Pon. Raja	2,832	1.36%	New
NOTA	None of the above	1,554	0.74%	▼0.42
Margin of victory		9,689	4.64%	▼5.14
Turnout		210,557	78.75%	▼0.24
Total valid votes		208,800		
Rejected ballots		203	0.10%	▲0.03
Registered electors		267,368		▲6.78
INC gain from AIADMK		Swing	▼3.29	
