= V. Yuvaraj =

Indian politician

V. Yuvaraj (born 1964) is an Indian politician from Tamil Nadu who belongs to Desiya Murpokku Dravida Kazhagam. He contested 2009 Lok Sabha elections from Chennei North.

He contested 2014 Lok Sabha elections from Thiruvallur (Lok Sabha constituency) as DMDK / NDA candidate.
