= C. N. Visvanathan =

Indian politician

C.N.Visvanathan

Member of Parliament (Lok Sabha) for Tirupattur (Lok Sabha constituency)
- In office 1977–1979

Personal details
- Born: 28 April 1947 (age 78) Chetpet
- Party: All India Anna Dravida Munnetra Kazhagam
- Profession: Politician

C.N.Visvanathan (born 28 April 1947) or Chetpet Natarajan Visvanathan was an Indian politician from the All India Anna Dravida Munnetra Kazhagam.

== Public life ==
Visvanathan joined the All India Anna Dravida Munnetra Kazhagam at an early age. In 1977, he stood for election from Thirupattur Lok Sabha constituency and was elected to the Lok Sabha or lower house of the Indian Parliament.
