= Kudanthai N. Ramalingam =

Indian politician

Kudanthai N. Ramalingam (born 15 August 1944) was an Indian politician and former Member of Parliament elected from Tamil Nadu. He was elected to the Lok Sabha as an Indian National Congress candidate from Mayuram constituency in a 1977 election, and as an Indian National Congress (Indira) candidate in a 1980 election.
