= P. Balaraman =

Indian politician

Member of Tamil Nadu Legislative Assembly for Ponneri
- In office 2016–2021
- Preceded by: Pon. Raja
- Succeeded by: Durai chandrasekhar

Personal details
- Party: AIADMK

P. Balaraman is an Indian politician from Tamil Nadu, India. He was elected from the Ponneri constituency to the Fifteenth Tamil Nadu Legislative Assembly as a member of the All India Anna Dravida Munnetra Kazhagam political party in the 2016 Tamil Nadu legislative assembly elections.

== Electoral performance ==
2021 Tamil Nadu Legislative Assembly election: Ponneri
Party	Candidate	Votes	%	±%
INC	Durai Chandrasekar	94,528	45.00%	New
AIADMK	P. Balaraman	84,839	40.39%	−8.17
NTK	A. Maheswari	19,027	9.06%	+8.24
MNM	D. Desingurajan	5,394	2.57%	New
AMMK	Pon. Raja	2,832	1.35%	New
NOTA	NOTA	1,554	0.74%	−0.42
BSP	J. Bhavani Ilavenil	1,106	0.53%	−0.06
Margin of victory		9,689	4.61%	−5.17%
Turnout		2,10,054	78.57%	−0.36%
Rejected ballots		203	0.10%	
Registered electors		2,67,345		
INC gain from AIADMK		Swing	-3.56%	

2016 Tamil Nadu Legislative Assembly election: Ponneri
Party	Candidate	Votes	%	±%
AIADMK	P. Balaraman	95,979	48.56%	−8.94
DMK	Dr. K. Parimalam	76,643	38.78%	+0.48
PMK	A. Pandian	9,586	4.85%	New
VCK	V. Senthil Kumar	5,566	2.82%	New
NOTA	NOTA	2,284	1.16%	New
BJP	K. Ganesan	2,067	1.05%	+0.23
NTK	S. Vinoth Babu	1,620	0.82%	New
BSP	S. Raja	1,152	0.58%	−0.24
Margin of victory		19,336	9.78%	−9.42%
Turnout		1,97,648	78.93%	−1.50%
Registered electors		2,50,403		
AIADMK hold		Swing	-8.94%	

2006 Tamil Nadu Legislative Assembly election: Ponneri
Party	Candidate	Votes	%	±%
AIADMK	P. Balaraman	84,259	48.09%	New
DMK	V. Anbuvanan	73,170	41.76%	+5.54
DMDK	S. Angamuthu	13,508	7.71%	New
Independent	E. Mani	1,649	0.94%	New
CPI(ML)L	S. Janakiraman	1,185	0.68%	New
Margin of victory		11,089	6.33%	−12.04%
Turnout		1,75,229	70.61%	9.37%
Registered electors		2,48,155		
AIADMK gain from CPI		Swing	-6.50%	
