= P. A. Saminathan =

Indian politician

P. Arumugam Saminathan Mudaliyar was an Indian politician and former Member of Parliament elected from Tamil Nadu. He was elected to the Lok Sabha from Gobichettipalayam constituency(now called as Tiruppur lok Sabha) as a Dravida Munnetra Kazhagam candidate in 1967, and 1971 elections.

He was born to wealthy Textile merchant Arumugam Mudaliyar of Senguntha Kaikolar Clan.

He was responsible for the drinking water project from Bhavanisagar to Punjai Pulimpatti.
