= P. S. Ramalingam =

Pethikuttai Subbayya Gowder Ramalingam (1945–2013) was a Tamil Nadu politician.

== Family and early life ==
P.S. Ramalingam was born in a small village called Pethikuttai in the state of Tamil Nadu, India in the year 1945. The only son of Subbayya Gowder and Chinnathai a farming family he was raised by his parents until he moved to other cities for higher education. Ramalingam did his schooling in the village and a nearby town Gobichettipalayam. He is married to Jothi and has 4 children.

== Education ==
Ramalingam did his Bachelor of Commerce (B.com) in Government Arts College Coimbatore between the years and further he did his Bachelor of Law in Law College Chennai between the years "" Hailing from a small farmers family he was always reminded about the importance of education by his father.

== Professional life ==
Ramalingam is a practicing lawyer and started practicing criminal law in the Coimbatore, Tamil Nadu courts.

== Political career ==
He was always interested in the Dravidian cause and was involved in the Dravidian movement from his student life. A staunch supporter and follower of Periyar and his ideology, Mr.Ramalingam joined the AIADMK and became a full-time activist. His mentor Dr.M.G.Ramachandran gave him an opportunity to represent the Nilgiri's parliamentary constitution in the year 1977, and he was a member of the 6th Lok Sabha.

In the year 1996 he became the Chairman for Mettupalayam Municipality and was influential in bringing and completing a water scheme that proved quite successful among many other development projects.

He died of a lung ailment on 17 January 2013.
