= K. Sundaram =

Indian politician

K. Sundaram is an Indian politician Former Minister and was a Member of the Legislative Assembly of Tamil Nadu. He was elected to the Tamil Nadu legislative assembly from Ponneri constituency as a Dravida Munnetra Kazhagam candidate in the 1989 and 1996 elections. The constituency was reserved for candidates from the Scheduled Castes. He died on September 18th, 2024.

== Electoral performance ==
2001 Tamil Nadu Legislative Assembly election: Ponneri
Party	Candidate	Votes	%	±%
CPI	A. S. Kannan	81,408	54.58%	New
DMK	K. Sundaram	54,018	36.22%	−25.5
MDMK	P. Duraikkannu	4,319	2.90%	−2.31
Independent	G. Devarajan	3,753	2.52%	New
Independent	A. D. Rathinam	2,211	1.48%	New
Puratchi Bharatham	M. Jayaseelan	1,326	0.89%	New
Independent	N. Maran	827	0.55%	New
Margin of victory		27,390	18.36%	−13.63%
Turnout		1,49,143	61.24%	−6.56%
Registered electors		2,43,530		
CPI gain from DMK		Swing	-7.13%	

1996 Tamil Nadu Legislative Assembly election: Ponneri
Party	Candidate	Votes	%	±%
DMK	K. Sundaram	87,547	61.72%	+31.49
AIADMK	G. Gunasekaran	42,156	29.72%	−35.02
MDMK	R. Krishnamoorthy	7,379	5.20%	New
CPI(ML)L	S. Janakiraman	1,923	1.36%	New
Independent	C. Paccikrisawamy	1,443	1.02%	New
BJP	M. Annamalai	867	0.61%	New
Margin of victory		45,391	32.00%	−2.52%
Turnout		1,41,856	67.80%	1.16%
Registered electors		2,16,818		
DMK gain from AIADMK		Swing	-3.02%	

1989 Tamil Nadu Legislative Assembly election: Ponneri
Party	Candidate	Votes	%	±%
DMK	K. Sundaram	51,928	44.53%	+4.57
AIADMK	K. Tamizharasan	44,321	38.01%	−21.05
INC	D. Yasodha	14,410	12.36%	New
AIADMK	K. P. K. Sekar Alias Kulasekaran	5,280	4.53%	−54.53
Margin of victory		7,607	6.52%	−12.57%
Turnout		1,16,616	71.28%	−5.12%
Registered electors		1,66,812		
DMK gain from AIADMK		Swing	-14.52%	
