= Lata Priyakumar =

Indian politician

Lata Priyakumar was an Indian politician and former member of the legislative assembly of Tamil Nadu. She was elected to the Tamil Nadu legislative assembly as an Indian National Congress candidate from Arakkonam constituency in the 1991 election. She died in June 2013. Lata was the daughter of the Indian politician and former member of parliament Maragatham Chandrasekar.

== Electoral performance ==
Election	Constituency	Political party	Result	Vote %	Opposition			Ref
Election	Constituency	Political party	Result	Vote %	Candidate	Political party	Vote %	Ref
1991	Arakkonam	INC	Won	55.24%	G. Mani	DMK	27.33%	
