= T. P. Elumalai =

Indian politician

Member of the Madras State Assembly
- In office 1952–1957
- Preceded by: N. Ramakrishna Iyer
- Constituency: Saidapet
- In office 1957 - 1962; 1962 - 1967
- Constituency: Ponneri

Personal details
- Party: Indian National Congress

T. P. Elumalai was an Indian politician and former Member of the Legislative Assembly of Tamil Nadu. He was elected to the Tamil Nadu legislative assembly from Saidapet constituency as an Indian National Congress candidate in 1952 election. The second winner was N. Ramakrishna Iyer. He was elected from Ponneri constituency as an Indian National Congress candidate in 1957, and 1962 elections. He was one of the two winners in the 1957 election, the other being V. Govindasami Naidu.
