= T. Nagaratnam =

Indian politician (1933–2007)

T. Nagarathinam
- Born: Thangavelu Nagarathinam; 1 September 1933; Nungakkam, Thiruvallur District, Tamil Nadu, British India
- Died: 8 June 2007 (aged 73); Thiruvallur, Tamil Nadu, India
- Education: Presidency College, Chennai
- Occupation: Politician

Thangavelu Nagarathinam (1 September 1933 – 8 June 2007) was an Indian Tamil politician.

== Life and career ==
Nagarathinam did his BA., from New Presidency College in Madras University and BL., in Dr. Ambedkar Law College Chennai. He was a member of Lok Sabha of India and has been elected two times from Sriperumbudur Constituency. He is an important leader of the DMK party and is known for political loyalty having been in the party.

Nagarathinam died from a long illness in Thiruvallur, on 8 June 2007, at the age of 73.
