= Pon. Raja =

Indian politician

Pon. Raja is an Indian politician and was a member of the 14th Tamil Nadu Legislative Assembly from the Ponneri constituency, which is reserved for candidates from the Scheduled Castes. He represented the All India Anna Dravida Munnetra Kazhagam party.

The elections of 2016 resulted in his constituency being won by P. Balaraman.

== Electoral performance ==
2011 Tamil Nadu Legislative Assembly election: Ponneri
Party	Candidate	Votes	%	±%
AIADMK	Pon. Raja	93,624	57.50%	+9.41
DMK	A. Manimekalai	62,354	38.29%	−3.46
BSP	S. Raja	1,347	0.83%	New
BJP	K. Ganesan	1,335	0.82%	New
Independent	S. Jayakanthan	1,167	0.72%	New
Margin of victory		31,270	19.20%	12.88%
Turnout		1,62,835	80.43%	9.82%
Registered electors		2,02,449		
AIADMK hold		Swing	9.41%	
