= Gobichettipalayam Lok Sabha constituency =

Former constituency of the Indian parliament in Tamil Nadu

Coordinates: 11°27′13″N 77°26′18″E

Gobichettipalayam
- Former Lok Sabha constituency

Constituency details
- Country: India
- Region: South India
- State: Tamil Nadu
- Established: 1977
- Abolished: 2008
- Reservation: None

Gobichettipalayam was a Lok Sabha constituency in Tamil Nadu. It ceased to exist and was renamed as Tiruppur constituency after the delimination by Election Commission in 2008. Former Union Minister C Subramaniam lost to P.A. Saminathan Mudaliyar in 1967 from Gobichettipalayam.

== Assembly segments ==
Gobichettipalayam Lok Sabha constituency was composed of the following assembly segments:

1. Gobichettipalayam (moved to Tiruppur Constituency)
2. Sathiyamangalam (defunct)
3. Perunthurai (moved to Tiruppur Constituency)
4. Bhavani (moved to Tiruppur Constituency)
5. Anthiyur (SC) (moved to Tiruppur Constituency)
6. Bhavanisagar (moved to Nilgiris Constituency)

== Members of the Parliament ==
Year	Winner	Party
1957	K. S. Ramaswamy	Indian National Congress
1962	P. G. Karuthiruman	Indian National Congress
1967	P. A. Saminathan	Dravida Munnetra Kazhagam
1971	P. A. Saminathan	Dravida Munnetra Kazhagam
1977	K. S. Ramaswamy	Indian National Congress
1980	G. Chinnasamy	All India Anna Dravida Munnetra Kazhagam
1984	P. Kholandaivelu	All India Anna Dravida Munnetra Kazhagam
1989	P. G. Narayanan	All India Anna Dravida Munnetra Kazhagam
1991	P. G. Narayanan	All India Anna Dravida Munnetra Kazhagam
1996	V. P. Shanmugasundaram	Dravida Munnetra Kazhagam
1998	V. K. Chinnasamy	All India Anna Dravida Munnetra Kazhagam
1999	K. K. Kaliappan	All India Anna Dravida Munnetra Kazhagam
2004	E. V. K. S. Elangovan	Indian National Congress
From 2008 : See Tiruppur

== Election results ==
Vote share of Winning candidates
2004	62.76%
1999	47.78%
1998	54.73%
1996	53.20%
1991	67.16%
1989	64.65%
1984	64.49%
1980	49.90%
1977	58.58%
1971	57.98%
1967	54.51%
1962	49.77%
1957	60.69%

=== General Elections 2004 ===
2004 Indian general election : Gobichettipalayam
Party	Candidate	Votes	%	±%
INC	E. V. K. S. Elangovan	426,826	62.76%	
AIADMK	N. R. Govindarajar	2,12,349	31.22%	−16.56%
Independent	S. Shaik Muhaideen	15,356	2.26%	
BSP	K. K. Muthusamy	6,039	0.89%	
JP	B. K. Arul Jothe	5,225	0.77%	
Independent	A. M. Sheik Davood	4,490	0.66%	
Margin of victory		2,14,477	31.54%	26.74%
Turnout		6,80,103	64.64%	4.35%
Registered electors		10,52,350		−1.31%
INC gain from AIADMK		Swing	14.98%	

=== General Elections 1999 ===
1999 Indian general election : Gobichettipalayam
Party	Candidate	Votes	%	±%
AIADMK	K. K. Kaliappan	299,184	47.78%	16.06%
DMK	K. G. S. Arjun	2,69,172	42.99%	−10.22%
TMC(M)	C. K. Kuppuswamy	48,304	7.71%	
TNP	Era Manikandan	3,224	0.51%	
Margin of victory		30,012	4.79%	−14.24%
Turnout		6,26,188	60.28%	−10.86%
Registered electors		10,66,362		4.42%
AIADMK hold		Swing	-5.42%	

=== General Elections 1998 ===
1998 Indian general election : Gobichettipalayam
Party	Candidate	Votes	%	±%
AIADMK	V. K. Chinnasamy	329,753	54.73%	
DMK	N. Ramasamy	2,15,111	35.71%	
INC	E. V. K. S. Elangovan	48,531	8.06%	
Independent	L. Suresh	7,836	1.30%	
Margin of victory		1,14,642	19.03%	−2.46%
Turnout		6,02,455	61.43%	−9.71%
Registered electors		10,21,268		5.08%
AIADMK gain from DMK		Swing	1.53%	

=== General Elections 1996 ===
1996 Indian general election : Gobichettipalayam
Party	Candidate	Votes	%	±%
DMK	V. P. Shanmugasundaram	353,982	53.20%	
AIADMK	P. G. Narayanan	2,11,014	31.71%	−35.45%
PMK	C. Nacchimuthu Nadar	38,368	5.77%	
MDMK	B. Palanisamy	34,096	5.12%	
BJP	A. Chandrasekar	11,104	1.67%	
Independent	L. P. Ponnusamy	3,086	0.46%	
Independent	Nallappannadi	3,066	0.46%	
Margin of victory		1,42,968	21.49%	−20.62%
Turnout		6,65,361	71.14%	3.73%
Registered electors		9,71,883		6.95%
DMK gain from AIADMK		Swing	-13.96%	

=== General Elections 1991 ===
1991 Indian general election : Gobichettipalayam
Party	Candidate	Votes	%	±%
AIADMK	P. G. Narayanan	397,431	67.16%	2.52%
JD	G. S. Lakshman Iyer	1,48,270	25.06%	
PMK	S. Chinnadurai	35,521	6.00%	
Independent	V. M. Chinnaponnu	2,654	0.45%	
Margin of victory		2,49,161	42.10%	5.67%
Turnout		5,91,763	67.41%	−1.70%
Registered electors		9,08,687		−0.47%
AIADMK hold		Swing	2.52%	

=== General Elections 1989 ===
1989 Indian general election : Gobichettipalayam
Party	Candidate	Votes	%	±%
AIADMK	P. G. Narayanan	400,932	64.65%	0.16%
DMK	N. K. K. Periasamy	1,74,975	28.21%	−5.65%
PMK	V. Ramanathan	37,521	6.05%	
Margin of victory		2,25,957	36.43%	5.81%
Turnout		6,20,202	69.11%	−5.72%
Registered electors		9,12,953		24.47%
AIADMK hold		Swing	0.16%	

=== General Elections 1984 ===
1984 Indian general election : Gobichettipalayam
Party	Candidate	Votes	%	±%
AIADMK	P. Kholandaivelu	338,243	64.49%	14.58%
DMK	P. A. Saminathan	1,77,616	33.86%	
Independent	A. R. Shahul Hameed	6,331	1.21%	
Margin of victory		1,60,627	30.62%	27.34%
Turnout		5,24,523	74.83%	10.78%
Registered electors		7,33,501		8.19%
AIADMK hold		Swing	14.58%	

=== General Elections 1980 ===
1980 Indian general election : Gobichettipalayam
Party	Candidate	Votes	%	±%
AIADMK	G. Chinnasamy	210,808	49.90%	
INC(I)	N. R. Thiruvankadam	1,96,933	46.62%	
Independent	E. Sidha Gounder	10,385	2.46%	
Independent	M. K. Shanmugam	4,326	1.02%	
Margin of victory		13,875	3.28%	−20.93%
Turnout		4,22,452	64.05%	−5.21%
Registered electors		6,78,003		4.48%
AIADMK gain from INC		Swing	-8.68%	

=== General Elections 1977 ===
1977 Indian general election : Gobichettipalayam
Party	Candidate	Votes	%	±%
INC	K. S. Ramaswamy	255,120	58.58%	16.56%
INC(O)	N. K. Karuppuswamy	1,49,662	34.37%	−7.65%
Independent	M. K. Shanmugham	18,243	4.19%	
Independent	M. Nanjappa Gounder	12,476	2.86%	
Margin of victory		1,05,458	24.22%	8.25%
Turnout		4,35,501	69.26%	0.35%
Registered electors		6,48,924		14.69%
INC gain from DMK		Swing	0.60%	

=== General Elections 1971 ===
1971 Indian general election : Gobichettipalayam
Party	Candidate	Votes	%	±%
DMK	P. A. Saminathan	219,662	57.98%	3.47%
INC(O)	E. V. K. Sampath	1,59,170	42.02%	0.60%
Margin of victory		60,492	15.97%	2.88%
Turnout		3,78,832	68.91%	−6.54%
Registered electors		5,65,827		10.09%
DMK hold		Swing	3.47%	

=== General Elections 1967 ===
1967 Indian general election : Gobichettipalayam
Party	Candidate	Votes	%	±%
DMK	P. A. Saminathan	203,798	54.51%	
INC	C. Subramaniam	1,54,853	41.42%	−8.35%
Independent	A. Muthusamy	10,911	2.92%	
RPI(A)	V. Venkatachalam	4,308	1.15%	
Margin of victory		48,945	13.09%	−11.77%
Turnout		3,73,870	75.44%	6.81%
Registered electors		5,13,981		18.05%
DMK gain from INC		Swing	4.74%	

=== General Elections 1962 ===
1962 Indian general election : Gobichettipalayam
Party	Candidate	Votes	%	±%
INC	P. G. Karuthiruman	142,993	49.77%	−10.92%
Independent	K. M. Ramasami Gounder	71,558	24.91%	
CPI	Jothinath Singh	61,327	21.35%	
Independent	Athani Bapu	11,429	3.98%	
Margin of victory		71,435	24.86%	3.49%
Turnout		2,87,307	68.64%	23.05%
Registered electors		4,35,401		4.41%
INC hold		Swing	-10.92%	

=== General Elections 1957 ===
1957 Indian general election : Gobichettipalayam
Party	Candidate	Votes	%	±%
INC	K. S. Ramaswamy	115,365	60.69%	
CPI	Jothinath Singh	74,734	39.31%	
Independent	Srinavasa Iyer	0	0.00%	
Margin of victory		40,631	21.37%	
Turnout		1,90,099	45.59%	
Registered electors		4,16,999		
INC win (new seat)				

== See also ==
- Gobichettipalayam
- List of constituencies of the Lok Sabha
