= Ponneri Assembly constituency =

State Legislative Assembly Constituency in Tamil Nadu

Coordinates: 13.32°N 80.2°E

Ponneri
- Constituency No. 2 for the Tamil Nadu Legislative Assembly

Constituency details
- Country: India
- Region: South India
- State: Tamil Nadu
- Established: 1951
- Total electors: 251,397
- Reservation: SC

Member of Legislative Assembly
- 17th Tamil Nadu Legislative Assembly
- Incumbent Durai Chandrasekar
- Party: INC
- Alliance: SPA
- Elected year: 2021

Ponneri is a state assembly constituency in Tiruvallur district of Tamil Nadu, India. Its State Assembly Constituency number is 2. It comprises a portion of Ponneri taluk and is a part of Thiruvallur Lok Sabha constituency for national elections to the Parliament of India. It is one of the 234 State Legislative Assembly Constituencies in Tamil Nadu, in India. Elections and winners in the constituency are listed below.

== Members of the Legislative Assembly ==
Election	Member	Party
1952	O. Chengam Pillai	Kisan Mazdoor Praja Party
1952	Gajapathi Reddiar	Kisan Mazdoor Praja Party
1957	V. Govindasami Naidu	Indian National Congress
1957	T. P. Elumalai	Indian National Congress
1962	T. P. Elumalai	Indian National Congress
1967	P. Nagalingam	Dravida Munnetra Kazhagam
1971	P. Nagalingam	Dravida Munnetra Kazhagam
1977	S. M. Dorairaj	All India Anna Dravida Munnetra Kazhagam
1980	R. Chakarapani	All India Anna Dravida Munnetra Kazhagam
1984	K. P. K. Sekar Alias K. P. Kulasekaran	All India Anna Dravida Munnetra Kazhagam
1989	K. Sundaram	Dravida Munnetra Kazhagam
1991	E. Ravikumar	All India Anna Dravida Munnetra Kazhagam
1996	K. Sundaram	Dravida Munnetra Kazhagam
2001	A. S. Kannan	Communist Party of India
2006	P. Balaraman	All India Anna Dravida Munnetra Kazhagam
2011	Pon. Raja	All India Anna Dravida Munnetra Kazhagam
2016	P. Balaraman	All India Anna Dravida Munnetra Kazhagam
2021	Durai Chandrasekar	Indian National Congress
2026	Dr. M. S. Ravi	Tamilaga Vettri Kazhagam

Madras State

== Election results ==
Vote share of winning candidates
2026	48.69%
2021	45.00%
2016	48.56%
2011	57.50%
2006	48.09%
2001	54.58%
1996	61.72%
1991	64.74%
1989	44.53%
1984	59.05%
1980	51.07%
1977	42.64%
1971	58.39%
1967	56.61%
1962	48.41%
1957	25.94%
1952	27.67%

=== 2026 ===
2026 Tamil Nadu Legislative Assembly election : Ponneri
Party	Candidate	Votes	%	±%
TVK	Dr. M. S. Ravi	110,439	48.69%	New
INC	Durai Chandrasekar	54,671	24.10%	▼21.17
AIADMK	P. Balaraman	51,468	22.69%	New
NTK	Rajathi. M	6,676	2.94%	▼6.17
NOTA	None of the above	865	0.38%	▼0.36
Margin of victory		55,768	24.59%	▲19.95
Turnout		226,873	90.24%	▲11.49
Total valid votes		226,819		
Registered electors		251,421		▼5.96
TVK gain from INC		Swing	▲3.42	

=== 2021 ===
2021 Tamil Nadu Legislative Assembly election : Ponneri
Party	Candidate	Votes	%	±%
INC	Durai Chandrasekar	94,528	45.27%	New
AIADMK	P. Balaraman	84,839	40.63%	▼7.93
NTK	A. Maheswari	19,027	9.11%	▲8.29
MNM	D. Desingurajan	5,394	2.58%	New
AMMK	Pon. Raja	2,832	1.36%	New
NOTA	None of the above	1,554	0.74%	▼0.42
Margin of victory		9,689	4.64%	▼5.14
Turnout		210,557	78.75%	▼0.24
Total valid votes		208,800		
Rejected ballots		203	0.10%	▲0.03
Registered electors		267,368		▲6.78
INC gain from AIADMK		Swing	▼3.29	

=== 2016 ===
2016 Tamil Nadu Legislative Assembly election : Ponneri
Party	Candidate	Votes	%	±%
AIADMK	P. Balaraman	95,979	48.56%	▼8.94
DMK	Dr. K. Parimalam	76,643	38.78%	▲0.49
PMK	A. Pandian	9,586	4.85%	New
VCK	V. Senthil Kumar	5,566	2.82%	New
NOTA	None of the above	2,284	1.16%	New
BJP	K. Ganesan	2,067	1.05%	▲0.23
NTK	S. Vinoth Babu	1,620	0.82%	New
Margin of victory		19,336	9.78%	▼9.42
Turnout		197,788	78.99%	▲78.99
Total valid votes		197,648		
Rejected ballots		140	0.07%	
Registered electors		250,403		▲23.69
AIADMK hold		Swing	▼8.94	

=== 2011 ===
2011 Tamil Nadu Legislative Assembly election : Ponneri
Party	Candidate	Votes	%	±%
AIADMK	Pon. Raja	93,624	57.50%	▲9.41
DMK	A. Manimekalai	62,354	38.29%	▼3.47
BSP	S. Raja	1,347	0.83%	▲0.34
BJP	K. Ganesan	1,335	0.82%	New
Independent	S. Jayakanthan	1,167	0.72%	New
Margin of victory		31,270	19.20%	▲12.87
Total valid votes		162,835		
Rejected ballots		53	0.00%	
Registered electors		202,449		▼18.42
AIADMK hold		Swing	▲9.41	

=== 2006 ===
2006 Tamil Nadu Legislative Assembly election : Ponneri
Party	Candidate	Votes	%	±%
AIADMK	P. Balaraman	84,259	48.09%	New
DMK	V. Anbuvanan	73,170	41.76%	▲5.54
DMDK	S. Angamuthu	13,508	7.71%	New
Independent	E. Mani	1,649	0.94%	New
CPI(ML)L	S. Janakiraman	1,185	0.68%	New
Margin of victory		11,089	6.33%	▼12.03
Turnout		175,234	70.61%	▲9.37
Total valid votes		175,229		
Registered electors		248,155		▲1.90
AIADMK gain from CPI		Swing	▼6.49	

=== 2001 ===
2001 Tamil Nadu Legislative Assembly election : Ponneri
Party	Candidate	Votes	%	±%
CPI	A. S. Kannan	81,408	54.58%	New
DMK	K. Sundaram	54,018	36.22%	▼25.50
MDMK	P. Duraikkannu	4,319	2.90%	▼2.30
Independent	G. Devarajan	3,753	2.52%	New
Independent	A. D. Rathinam	2,211	1.48%	New
Puratchi Bharatham	M. Jayaseelan	1,326	0.89%	New
Margin of victory		27,390	18.36%	▼13.64
Turnout		149,148	61.24%	▼6.56
Total valid votes		149,143		
Registered electors		243,530		▲12.32
CPI gain from DMK		Swing	▼7.14	

=== 1996 ===
1996 Tamil Nadu Legislative Assembly election : Ponneri
Party	Candidate	Votes	%	±%
DMK	K. Sundaram	87,547	61.72%	▲31.50
AIADMK	G. Gunasekaran	42,156	29.72%	New
MDMK	R. Krishnamoorthy	7,379	5.20%	New
CPI(ML)L	S. Janakiraman	1,923	1.36%	New
Independent	C. Paccikrisawamy	1,443	1.02%	New
BJP	M. Annamalai	867	0.61%	New
Margin of victory		45,391	32.00%	▼2.51
Turnout		147,013	67.80%	▲1.15
Total valid votes		141,856		
Registered electors		216,818		▲16.54
DMK gain from AIADMK		Swing	▼3.02	

=== 1991 ===
1991 Tamil Nadu Legislative Assembly election : Ponneri
Party	Candidate	Votes	%	±%
AIADMK	E. Ravikumar	77,374	64.74%	New
DMK	K. Parthasarathy	36,121	30.22%	▼14.31
PMK	R. Nagappan	4,965	4.15%	New
Margin of victory		41,253	34.51%	▲27.99
Turnout		124,003	66.65%	▼4.63
Total valid votes		119,522		
Registered electors		186,052		▲11.53
AIADMK gain from DMK		Swing	▲20.21	

=== 1989 ===
1989 Tamil Nadu Legislative Assembly election : Ponneri
Party	Candidate	Votes	%	±%
DMK	K. Sundaram	51,928	44.53%	▲4.57
AIADMK	C. K. Thamizharasan	44,321	38.01%	New
INC	D. Yasodha	14,410	12.36%	New
AIADMK	K. P. K. Sekar Alias K. P. Kulasekaran	5,280	4.53%	New
Margin of victory		7,607	6.52%	▼12.57
Turnout		118,907	71.28%	▼5.13
Total valid votes		116,616		
Registered electors		166,812		▲16.57
DMK gain from AIADMK		Swing	▼14.52	

=== 1984 ===
1984 Tamil Nadu Legislative Assembly election : Ponneri
Party	Candidate	Votes	%	±%
AIADMK	K. P. K. Sekar Alias K. P. Kulasekaran	61,559	59.05%	▲7.98
DMK	K. Sundaram	41,655	39.96%	▲6.85
Margin of victory		19,904	19.09%	▲1.12
Turnout		109,341	76.41%	▲14.01
Total valid votes		104,244		
Registered electors		143,104		▲5.99
AIADMK hold		Swing	▲7.98	

=== 1980 ===
1980 Tamil Nadu Legislative Assembly election : Ponneri
Party	Candidate	Votes	%	±%
AIADMK	R. Chakarapani	42,408	51.07%	New
DMK	P. Nagalingam	27,490	33.11%	▲5.58
Independent	G. Vetriveeran	7,508	9.04%	New
JP	R. S. Munivel	4,619	5.56%	New
Margin of victory		14,918	17.97%	▲2.85
Turnout		84,245	62.40%	▲5.89
Total valid votes		83,033		
Registered electors		135,012		▲0.66
AIADMK gain from AIADMK		Swing	▲8.43	

=== 1977 ===
1977 Tamil Nadu Legislative Assembly election : Ponneri
Party	Candidate	Votes	%	±%
AIADMK	S. M. Dorairaj	31,796	42.64%	New
DMK	G. Vetriveeran	20,524	27.53%	▼30.86
JP	V. Nargunam	14,170	19.00%	New
INC	K. N. Arumugam	6,422	8.61%	New
Independent	G. Chinnaraj	1,085	1.46%	New
Independent	A. P. Elumalai	564	0.76%	New
Margin of victory		11,272	15.12%	▼11.49
Turnout		75,794	56.51%	▼16.69
Total valid votes		74,561		
Registered electors		134,125		▲38.10
AIADMK gain from DMK		Swing	▼15.75	

=== 1971 ===
1971 Tamil Nadu Legislative Assembly election : Ponneri
Party	Candidate	Votes	%	±%
DMK	P. Nagalingam	39,783	58.39%	▲1.78
INC	T. P. Elumalai	21,650	31.77%	New
Independent	C. K. Manickam	6,703	9.84%	New
Margin of victory		18,133	26.61%	▲11.62
Turnout		71,089	73.20%	▼3.91
Total valid votes		68,136		
Registered electors		97,121		▲7.82
DMK hold		Swing	▲1.78	

=== 1967 ===
1967 Madras State Legislative Assembly election : Ponneri
Party	Candidate	Votes	%	±%
DMK	P. Nagalingam	37,746	56.61%	▲27.48
INC	T. P. Elumalai	27,751	41.62%	▼6.79
Independent	A. P. Elumalai	1,177	1.77%	New
Margin of victory		9,995	14.99%	▼4.29
Turnout		69,461	77.11%	▲13.12
Total valid votes		66,674		
Registered electors		90,079		▲1.07
DMK gain from INC		Swing	▲8.20	

=== 1962 ===
1962 Madras State Legislative Assembly election : Ponneri
Party	Candidate	Votes	%	±%
INC	T. P. Elumalai	26,125	48.41%	▼2.88
DMK	P. Nagalingam	15,721	29.13%	New
CPI	C. K. Manickam	9,092	16.85%	▲10.14
Independent	A. Dharma Lingam	1,035	1.92%	New
Independent	A. P. Elumalai	995	1.84%	New
Independent	M. P. B. Jeevaratham	569	1.05%	New
Independent	G. A. Ramadoss	429	0.79%	New
Margin of victory		10,404	19.28%	▲5.45
Turnout		57,032	63.99%	▼8.44
Total valid votes		53,966		
Registered electors		89,125		▼47.87
INC hold		Swing	▲22.47	

=== 1957 ===
1957 Madras State Legislative Assembly election : Ponneri
Party	Candidate	Votes	%	±%
INC	V. Govindasami Naidu	32,119	25.94%	▼6.77
INC	T. P. Elumalai	31,392	25.35%	▼7.36
Independent	T. Shanmugam	14,995	12.11%	New
Independent	O. Chengam Pillai	13,639	11.01%	New
Independent	M. Jayaram Reddi	10,873	8.78%	New
CPI	C. K. Manickam	8,306	6.71%	New
Independent	M. Kuppuswami	4,872	3.93%	New
Independent	Elimalai S/o Palayam	4,570	3.69%	New
Independent	Thirvenkata Naicker	3,069	2.48%	New
Margin of victory		17,124	13.83%	▲4.26
Turnout		123,835	72.43%	▼1.01
Total valid votes		123,835		
Registered electors		170,967		▲26.39
INC gain from KMPP		Swing	▼1.73	

=== 1952 ===
1952 Madras State Legislative Assembly election : Ponneri
Party	Candidate	Votes	%	±%
KMPP	O. Chengam Pillai	27,489	27.67%	New
KMPP	Gajapathi Reddiar	25,626	25.79%	New
INC	M. Bhaktavatsalam	17,985	18.10%	New
INC	C. Lakshmana Pillai	14,510	14.61%	New
Independent	M. P. B. Jeevaratham	9,200	9.26%	New
Independent	Venkatakrishna Sarma	4,007	4.03%	New
Margin of victory		9,504	9.57%	
Turnout		99,346	73.44%	
Total valid votes		99,346		
Registered electors		135,266		
KMPP win (new seat)				
