= List of people from Tirunelveli district =

== Literary figures ==
- TK Ramanuja Kavirajar, Tamil epic poet, playwright and humanitarian
- Henry Alfred Krishnapillai, composer of Ratchanya Yathreegam
- Daniel Selvaraj, Sahitya Academi Award-winning Tamil writer
- Vannadhasan, Sahitya Academy Award - winning Tamil writer

== Freedom fighters ==
- Puli Thevar
- Muhammad Ismail Rowther (Quaid-e-Millat—"Leader of the Nation")

== Politicians ==
- Aladi Aruna, Law minister of Tamilnadu (1996-2001)
- Vaiko, General Secretary, Marumalarchi Dravida Munnetra Kazhagam (MDMK)
- S. Chellapandian, speaker (1962–1967)
- R. Avudaiyappan, speaker (2006–2011)
- P. H. Pandian, speaker (1984–1988)
- M.Appavu, Speaker (From 2021)

== Academics ==
- Subrahmonian Machendranathan (born 1954), government of India, chairperson of Airports Economic Regulatory Authority

== Artists ==
=== Actors ===
- Delhi Ganesh
- Inigo Prabhakar
- Nellai Siva
- Anto Ridon
- Vivek (actor)

=== Musical directors ===
- Bharadwaj

=== Directors ===
- Kathir
- Vikraman
- Visu
- Mari Selvaraj
- S.J Suryah
- Dharani
- Durai
- A. Venkatesh

== Businesspersons ==
- T. V. Sundaram Iyengar, founder of TVS group
- Shiv Nadar, founder of HCL
- V. G. Panneerdas, founder of VGP group
- P. Rajagopal, founder of Saravana Bhavan
- N.Srinivasan, Indian industrialist. He is a former Chairman of the International Cricket Council (ICC) and former President of the BCCI, the governing body for cricket in India. He is also the managing director of India Cements Limited.
- S.Gnanathiraviam, Founder Annai Groups, Member of Parliament, Tirunelveli Constituency.

== Sportspeople ==
- Vijay Shankar (cricketer)
