= 1989 Indian general election in Tamil Nadu =

- 22 November 1989

39 (of 529) seats in the Lok Sabha
- Registered: 40,027,212
- Turnout: 26,763,788 (66.86%) ▼6.12%
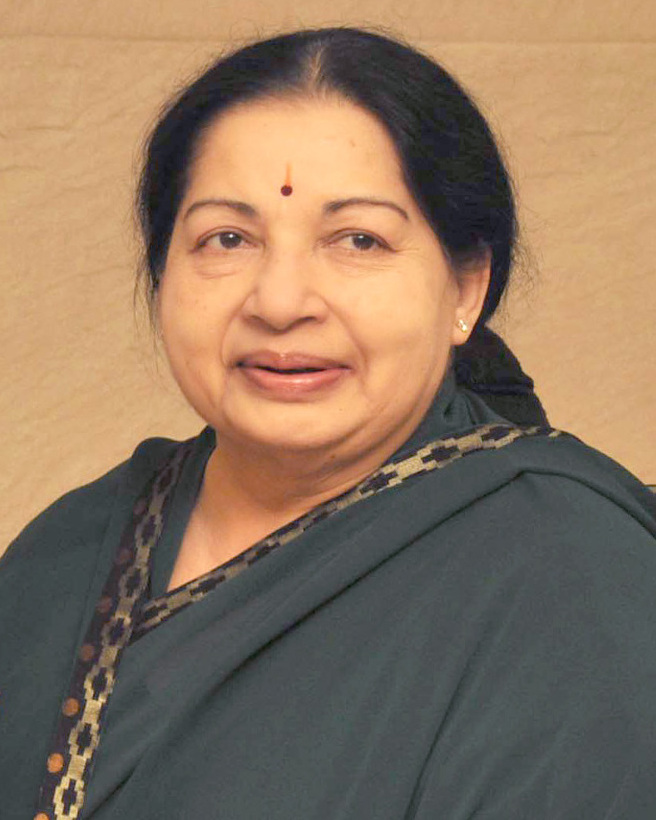

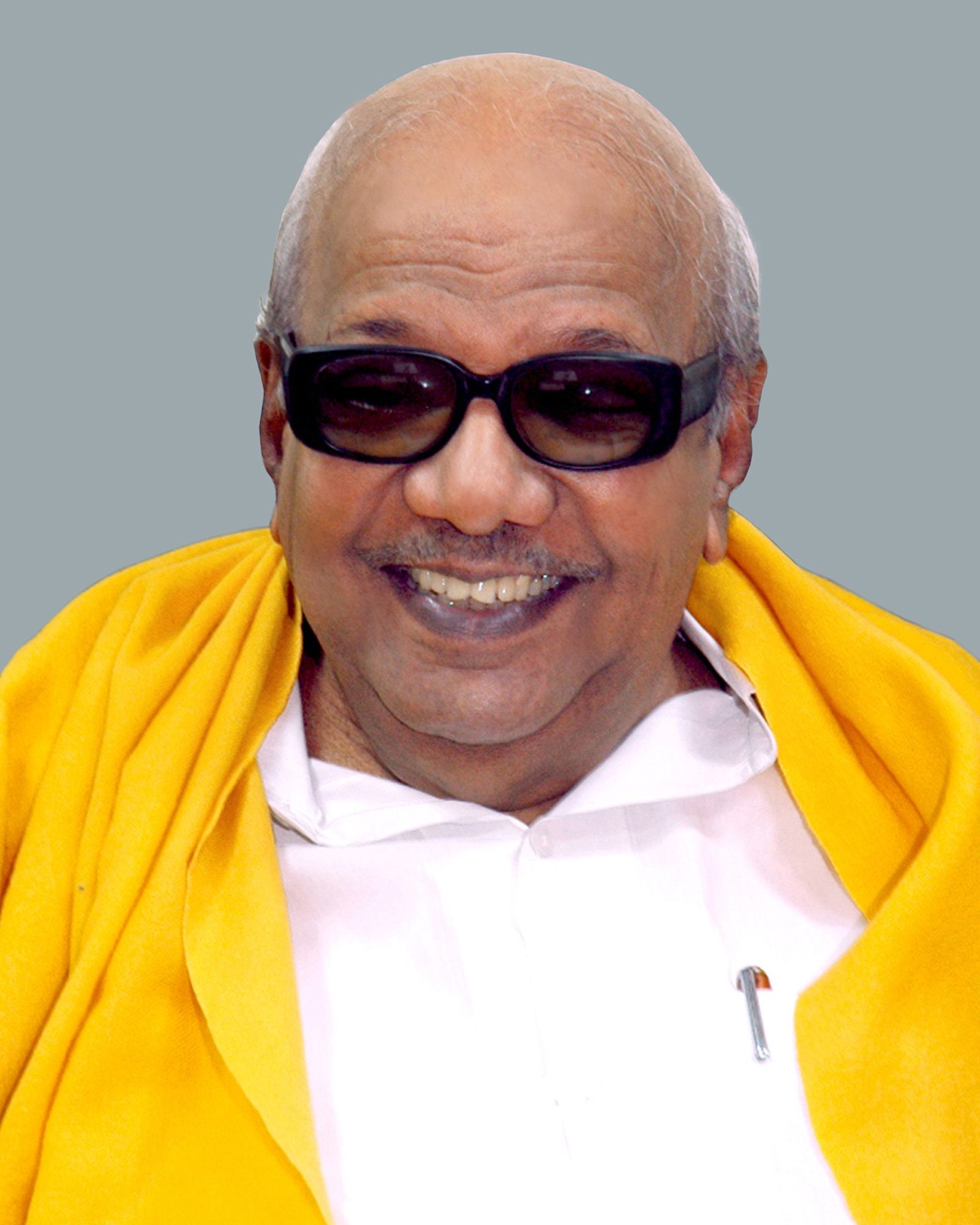
	First party	Second party
Leader	J. Jayalalithaa	M. Karunanidhi
Party	AIADMK	DMK
Alliance	Congress alliance	NF+LF
Leader's seat	Did not contest	Did not contest
Seats won	38	1
Seat change	▲1	▼1
Popular vote	15,042,676	8,918,905
Percentage	56.98%	33.78%
Swing	▼1.89%	▲1.63%
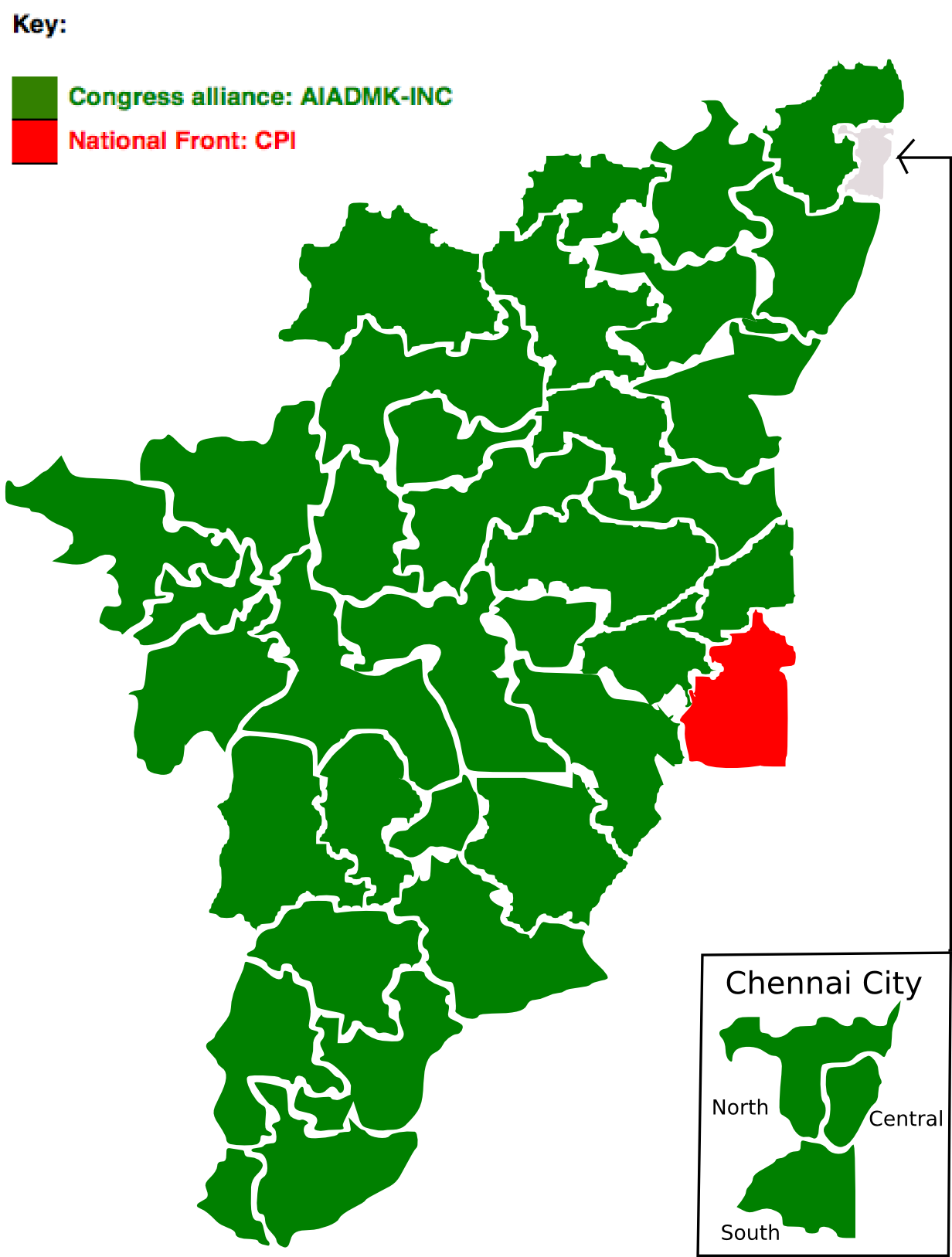
- 1989 election map (by constituencies); Green = INC+ (won all the seats)

- Seat Wise Result
Prime Minister before election
Rajiv Gandhi
INC(I)
Prime Minister after election
V. P. Singh
JD

The 1989 Indian general election polls in Tamil Nadu were held for 39 seats in the state. The result was a landslide victory for Indian National Congress, and its ally All India Anna Dravida Munnetra Kazhagam, winning 38 out of 39 seats. This election marked the dominance of INC-AIADMK in Tamil Nadu, till 1996. The opposition party Dravida Munnetra Kazhagam failed to win a single seat, resulting in the party's downturn in national and state politics for the coming years. Because National Front won at the national level, Rajya Sabha member Murasoli Maran got a cabinet berth in the new V. P. Singh administration.

== Seat Allotment ==
=== Congress Front ===
AIADMK-led Alliance
Party	Flag	Symbol	Leader	Seats	
Indian National Congress			Rajiv Gandhi	26	28
Muslim League (Samad)			A. K. A. Abdul Samad	1	28
United Communist Party of India			D. Pandian	1	28
All India Anna Dravida Munnetra Kazhagam			J. Jayalalithaa	11	
Total				39	

=== National Front ===
DMK-led Alliance
Party	Flag	Symbol	Leader	Seats	
Dravida Munnetra Kazhagam			M. Karunanidhi	30	31
Muslim League (Latheif)			M. Abdul Lathief	1	31
Communist Party of India (Marxist)			A. Nallasivam	4	
Janata Dal			Era Sezhiyan	2	
Communist Party of India			P. Manickam	2	
Total				39	

=== PMK Front ===
PMK-led Alliance
Party	Flag	Symbol	Leader	Seats
Pattali Makkal Katchi			Dr. Ramdoss	32
Total				32

== List of Candidates ==
Constituency		AIADMK+		DMK+		PMK	
#	Name	Party	Candidate	Party	Candidate	Party	Candidate
1	Madras North	INC	D. Pandian (Note: United Communist Party of India contested on the "Hand" symbol of the Indian National Congress (INC), and is officially recorded as a INC candidate in electoral records.)	DMK	N. V. N. Somu	PMK	Rama Muthukumar
2	Madras Central	INC	Era. Anbarasu	DMK	A. Kalanithi	PMK	K. Raghunathan
3	Madras South	INC	Vyjayanthimala	DMK	Aladi Aruna	PMK	V. Sivaraman
4	Sriperumbudur (SC)	INC	M. Chandrasekar	DMK	K. Ganesan		
5	Chengalpattu	ADMK	K. Panneerselvam	DMK	M. V. Ramu		
6	Arakkonam	INC	J. Rangaswamy	DMK	K. Murthy	PMK	S. Subramaniam
7	Vellore	INC	A. K. A. Abdul Samad (Note: Abdul Samad-led Muslim League contested on the "Hand" symbol of the Indian National Congress (INC), and is officially recorded as a INC candidate in electoral records.)	DMK	M. Abdul Lathief (Note: Abdul Lathief-led Muslim League contested on the "Rising Sun" symbol of the Dravida Munnetra Kazhagam (DMK), and is officially recorded as a DMK candidate in electoral records.)	PMK	R. Mohan
8	Tiruppattur	INC	A. Jayamohan	DMK	K. C. Alagiri		
9	Vandavasi	INC	L. Balaraman	DMK	D. Venugopal	PMK	D. Kasilingam
10	Tindivanam	INC	R. Eramadass	DMK	N. Dhayanithi	PMK	S. Shanmugham
11	Cuddalore	INC	P. R. S. Venkatesan	DMK	G. Bhaskaran	PMK	V. R. Dhandapani
12	Chidambaram (SC)	INC	P. Vallalperuman	DMK	A. Ayyasamy	PMK	Dalit Ezhilmalai
13	Dharmapuri	ADMK	M. G. Sekhar	DMK	M. Kandasamy	PMK	B. D. Elangovan
14	Krishnagiri	INC	K. Ramamurthy	JD	B. Venkataswamy	PMK	C. Arumugam
15	Rasipuram (SC)	INC	B. Devarajan	DMK	R. Mayavan	PMK	P. Jayabal
16	Salem	INC	R. Kumaramangalam	DMK	M. Karthikeyan	PMK	K. Sadasivam
17	Tiruchengode	ADMK	K. C. Palanisamy	DMK	C. Poongothi Thirumathi	PMK	K. Chandrashekar
18	Nilgiris	INC	R. Prabhu	DMK	S. A. Mahalingam		
19	Gobichettipalayam	ADMK	P. G. Narayanan	DMK	N. K. K. Periasamy	PMK	V. Ramanathan
20	Coimbatore	INC	C. K. Kuppuswamy	CPI(M)	R. Umanath	PMK	V. Rangan
21	Pollachi (SC)	ADMK	B. Raja Ravi Varma	CPI	M. Aurmugham	PMK	T. Subramaniam
22	Palani	INC	A. Senapathi Gounder	DMK	Rajkumar Mandradiar	PMK	K. Ponnaiah
23	Dindigul	ADMK	C. Sreenivasan	CPI(M)	N. Varatharajan	PMK	K. Raithinasamy
24	Madurai	INC	A. G. S. Ram Babu	DMK	V. Velusamy	PMK	K. Ponniah
25	Periyakulam	ADMK	R. Muthiah	DMK	A. K. Cumbum Mahandiran	PMK	S. Gunesekaran
26	Karur	ADMK	M. Thambidurai	DMK	K. C. Palanisamy	PMK	M. Sakthivel
27	Tiruchirappalli	INC	L. Adaikalaraj	CPI(M)	T. K. Rangarajan	PMK	R. Packiam
28	Perambalur (SC)	ADMK	A. Asokraj	DMK	S. Panovaikaruthazhan	PMK	B. John Pandian
29	Mayiladuthurai	INC	E. S. M. Packeer Md.	DMK	P. Kalyanam	PMK	K. Kottravamoorthy
30	Nagapattinam (SC)	INC	N. S. Veeramurasu	CPI	M. Selvarasu	PMK	V. S. Thagaraju
31	Thanjavur	INC	S. Singaravadivel	DMK	S. S. Palanimanickam	PMK	Kothai Kesavan
32	Pudukkottai	INC	N. Sundarraj	DMK	A. Selvaraj	PMK	A. Sivaperumal
33	Sivaganga	INC	P. Chidambaram	DMK	A. Ganesan	PMK	A. P. Raju
34	Ramanathapuram	INC	V. Rajeshwaran	DMK	Suba Thangavelan		
35	Sivakasi	ADMK	K. Kalimuthu	DMK	Vaiko	PMK	J. S. Balaiah
36	Tirunelveli	ADMK	R. Janarthanan	DMK	D. S. A. Sivaprakasam		
37	Tenkasi (SC)	INC	M. Arunachalam	CPI(M)	R. Krishan		
38	Tiruchendur	INC	R. Dhanuskodi	DMK	A. Karthikeyan	PMK	C. Papanasam
39	Nagercoil	INC	N. Dennis	JD	D. Kumaradas	PMK	S. Kennady Peter

== Voting and results ==
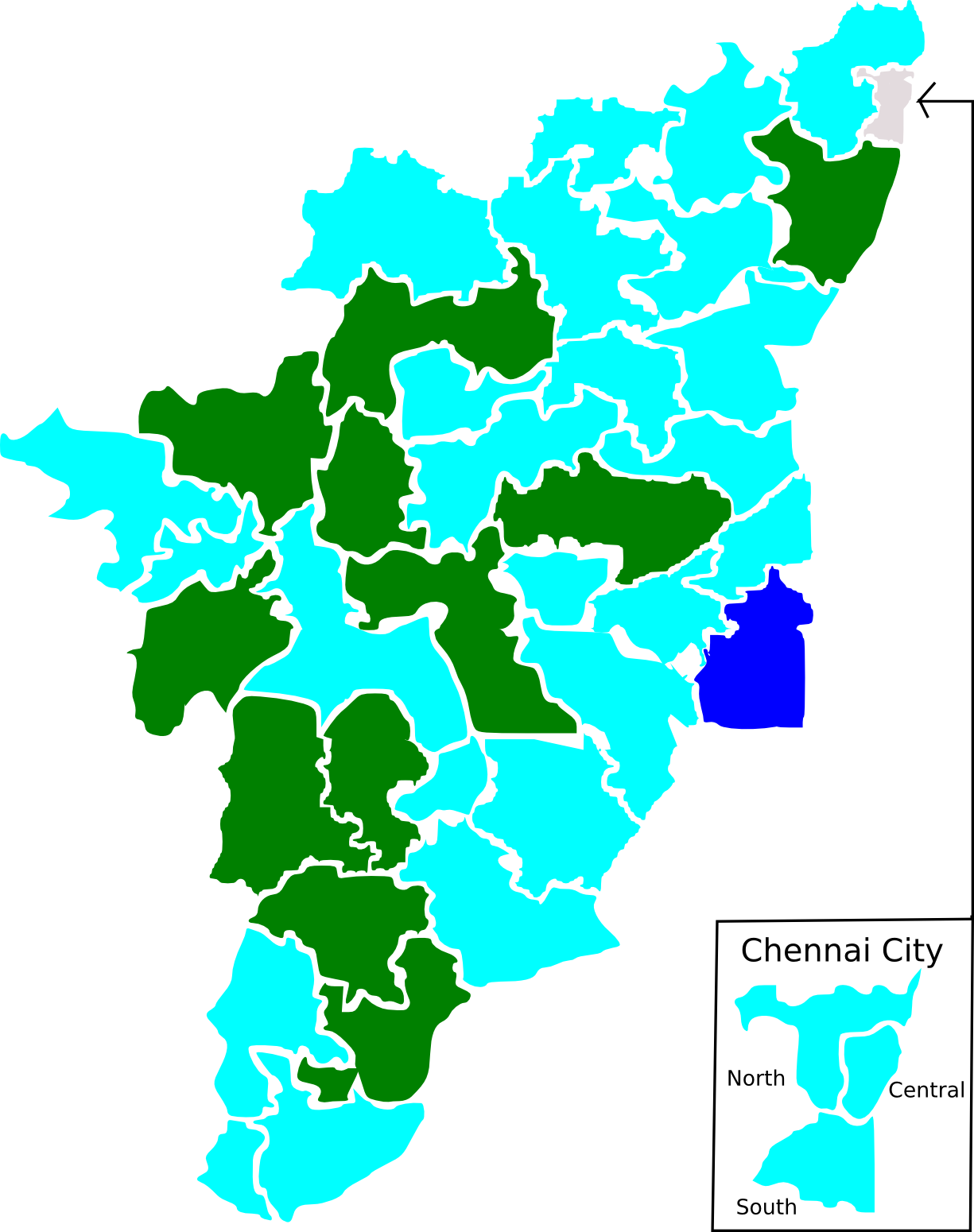
Election map of results based on parties. Colours are based on the results table on the left

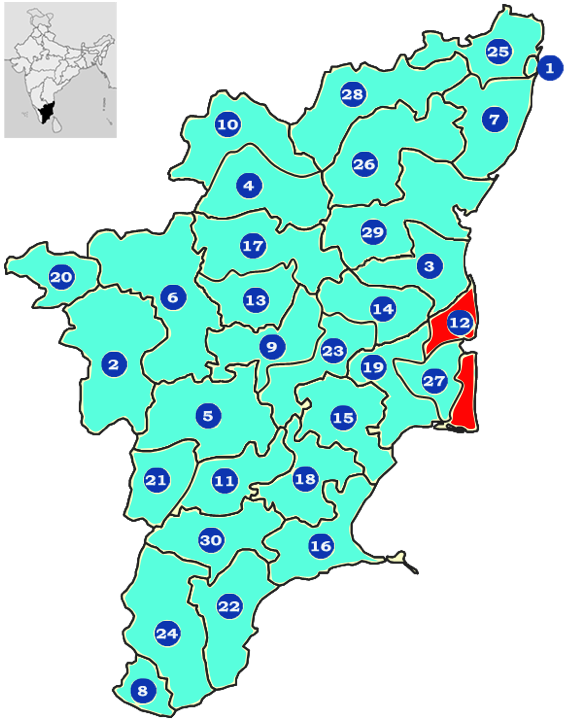
Election Map (Results reflected as %seats won by districts) ADMK-INC alliance won all the seats in this district DMK-JP-CPI alliance won the lone seat in this district (Nagapattinam)

Alliance	Party	Popular Vote	Percentage	Swing	Seats won	Seat Change
AIADMK+	Indian National Congress	10,524,027	39.86%	▼0.65%	27	▲2
AIADMK+	All India Anna Dravida Munnetra Kazhagam	4,518,649	17.12%	▼1.24%	11	▼1
AIADMK+	Total	15,042,676	56.98%	▼1.89%	38	▲1
National Front	Communist Party of India	539,316	2.04%	▼1.37%	1	▲1
National Front	Dravida Munnetra Kazhagam	7,038,849	26.66%	▲0.76%	0	▼2
National Front	Communist Party of India (Marxist)	965,838	3.66%	▲0.82%	0	Steady
National Front	Janata Dal	374,902	1.42%	new party	0	new party
National Front	Total	8,918,905	33.78%	▲1.63%	1	▼1
Pattali Makkal Katchi		1,536,350	5.82%	new party	0	new party
Independents		599,759	2.27%	▼0.49%	0	Steady
Other Parties (14 parties)		302,040	1.15%		0	
Total		26,399,730	100.00%	Steady	39	Steady
Valid Votes		26,399,730	98.64%			
Invalid Votes		364,058	1.36%			
Total Votes		26,763,788	100.00%			
Registered Voters/Turnout		40,027,212	66.86%	▼6.12%		

- The two seats won in 1984 represents seats won by DMK.

== List of Elected MPs ==
Constituency		Winner				Runner Up				Margin	%
#	Name	Candidate	Party	Votes	%	Candidate	Party	Votes	%	Margin	%
1	Madras North	D. Pandian	INC	445,197	54.84	N. V. M. Somu	DMK	331,426	40.83	113,771	14.01
2	Madras Central	Era Anbarasu	INC	329,739	53.35	A. Kalinidhi	DMK	263,333	42.61	66,406	10.74
3	Madras South	Vyjayantimala Bali	INC	445,864	53.91	Aladi Aruna	DMK	320,020	38.70	125,844	15.21
4	Sriperumbudur (SC)	M. Chandrasekar	INC	387,795	54.90	K. Ganesan	DMK	233,244	33.02	154,551	21.88
5	Chengalpattu	Kanchee Paneer	ADMK	338,711	49.12	M. V. Ramu	DMK	215,844	31.30	122,867	17.82
6	Arakkonam	R. Jeevarathinam	INC	299,587	42.77	K. Murthy	DMK	237,194	33.86	62,393	8.91
7	Vellore	A. K. A. Ab. Samad	INC	356,637	54.20	M. Abdul Latheef	DMK	195,787	29.75	160,850	24.45
8	Tiruppattur	A. Jayamohan	INC	376,733	55.79	K. C. Alagiri	DMK	241,900	35.82	134,833	19.97
9	Vandavasi	L. Balaraman	INC	313,160	47.17	D. Venugopal	DMK	212,988	32.08	100,172	15.09
10	Tindivanam	R. Eramadass	INC	299,184	46.19	N. Dhayanithi	DMK	198,469	30.64	100,715	15.55
11	Cuddalore	P. R. S. Venkatesan	INC	331,617	50.58	G. Bhaskaran	DMK	214,782	32.76	116,835	17.82
12	Chidambaram (SC)	P. Vallalperuman	INC	205,229	30.98	A. Ayyasamy	DMK	176,946	26.71	28,283	4.27
13	Dharmapuri	M. G. Sekhar	ADMK	315,921	46.52	B. D. Elangovan	PMK	202,901	29.88	113,020	16.64
14	Krishnagiri	K. Ramamoorthy	INC	362,376	61.04	B. Venkataswamy	JD	160,882	27.10	201,494	33.94
15	Rasipuram (SC)	B. Devarajan	INC	421,674	67.01	R. Mayavan	DMK	169,699	26.97	251,975	40.04
16	Salem	R. Kumarmangalam	INC	400,936	60.85	M. Karthikeyan	DMK	159,166	24.16	241,770	36.69
17	Tiruchengode	K. C. Palanisamy	ADMK	509,847	63.16	C. Poongothi Thirumathi	DMK	237,576	29.43	272,271	33.73
18	Nilgiris	R. Prabhu	INC	455,411	61.49	S. A. Mahalingam	DMK	281,640	38.03	173,771	23.46
19	Gobichettipalayam	P. G. Narayanan	ADMK	400,932	64.65	N. K. K. Pariasamy	DMK	174,975	28.21	225,957	36.44
20	Coimbatore	C. K. Kuppusamy	INC	426,721	56.68	R. Umanath	CPI(M)	286,653	38.07	140,068	18.61
21	Pollachi (SC)	B. Raja Ravi Varma	ADMK	428,704	67.28	M. Aurmugham	CPI	197,395	30.98	231,309	36.30
22	Palani	A. Senapathi Gounder	INC	316,938	50.68	Rajkumar Mandradiar	DMK	236,025	37.74	80,913	12.94
23	Dindigul	C. Srinivasan	ADMK	434,966	67.24	N. Varatharajan	CPI(M)	199,598	30.86	235,368	36.38
24	Madurai	A. G. S. Ram Babu	INC	456,442	64.12	V. Velusamy	DMK	242,664	34.09	213,778	30.03
25	Periyakulam	R. Mothiah	ADMK	402,691	61.35	A. K. Mahandiran	DMK	181,287	27.62	221,404	33.73
26	Karur	M. Thambithurai	ADMK	484,492	65.60	K. C. Palanisamy	DMK	245,741	33.27	238,751	32.33
27	Tiruchirappalli	L. Adaikalaraj	INC	429,185	61.06	T. K. Rengarajan	CPI(M)	259,219	36.88	169,966	24.18
28	Perambalur (SC)	A. Asokaraj	ADMK	357,565	53.41	S. Panovaikaruthazhan	DMK	221,389	33.07	136,176	20.34
29	Mayiladuthurai	E. S. M. Packeer Md.	INC	352,492	52.42	P. Kalyanam	DMK	250,547	37.26	101,945	15.16
30	Nagapattinam (SC)	M. Selvarasu	CPI	341,921	49.32	N. S. Veeramurasu	INC	320,398	46.22	21,523	3.10
31	Thanjavur	S. Singravadivel	INC	371,967	56.37	S. Palanimanickam	DMK	274,820	41.64	97,147	14.73
32	Pudukkottai	N. Sundaraja	INC	518,762	66.65	A. Selvaraj	DMK	247,626	31.82	271,136	34.83
33	Sivaganga	P. Chidambaram	INC	430,290	65.86	A. Ganesan	DMK	210,738	32.26	219,552	33.60
34	Ramanathapuram	V. Rajeshwaran	INC	398,145	63.57	S. P. Thangavelan	DMK	218,601	34.90	179,544	28.67
35	Sivakasi	K. Kalimuthu	ADMK	450,376	58.21	V. Gopalsamy	DMK	313,308	40.50	137,068	17.71
36	Tirunelveli	Janartanan	ADMK	394,444	65.01	D. S. A. Sivaprakasam	DMK	203,309	33.51	191,135	31.50
37	Tenkasi (SC)	M. Arunachalam	INC	393,075	62.50	R. Krishan	CPI(M)	220,368	35.04	172,707	27.46
38	Tiruchendur	R. Dhanuskodi Athithan	INC	385,656	67.73	A. Karthikeyan	DMK	173,585	30.48	212,071	37.25
39	Nagercoil	N. Dennis	INC	292,817	53.20	D. Kumaradhass	JD	214,020	38.88	78,797	14.32

== Post-election Union Council of Ministers from Tamil Nadu ==
Source: New York Times
Due to the fact, that the DMK-JD were routed in Tamil Nadu, VP Singh had to choose Rajya Sabha member, Murasoli Maran to represent Tamil Nadu in his cabinet.

=== Cabinet ministers ===
Minister	Party	Lok Sabha Constituency/Rajya Sabha	Portfolios
Murasoli Maran	DMK	Rajya Sabha	Minister of Urban Development

== See also ==
- Elections in Tamil Nadu

== Bibliography ==
- Volume I, 1989 Indian general election, 9th Lok Sabha
