= Gurunathan =

Gurunathan is a surname and a given name. Notable people with the name include:

- J. Guru (alias) Gurunathan (1961–2018), aka Kaduvetti Guru, Indian politician
- K Gurunathan, former Mayor of Kāpiti Coast, New Zealand
- S. Gurunathan, Indian politician
- S. K. Gurunathan (1908–1966), Indian sports journalist
- Gurunathan Muthuswamy (born 1963), Indian weightlifter
