= Swarnalatha =

Indian singer

- Swarnalatha at a studio

Background information
- Also known as: Humming Queen
- Born: 29 April 1973; Chittur, Palakkad, Kerala, India
- Died: 12 September 2010 (aged 37) Chennai, Tamil Nadu, India
- Genres: Cinema Playback singing, Carnatic music, Hindustani Music, Ghazal
- Occupation: Singer
- Instrument: Vocals
- Years active: 1987–2010

Swarnalatha (29 April 1973 – 12 September 2010) was an Indian playback singer. In a career spanning almost 22 years (from 1987 until her death), she recorded songs in many Indian languages, including Tamil, Telugu, Malayalam, Kannada, Hindi, Urdu, Bengali, Oriya, Punjabi, and Badaga.

She won the National Film Award for Best Female Playback Singer for her rendition of the song "Porale Ponnuthayi" from the film Karuththamma. The song was composed by A. R. Rahman, under whose musical direction she recorded many memorable songs. She was also the first female playback singer to receive a National Award in A. R. Rahman Music.

== Personal life ==
She was born to K. C. Cherukutty and Kalyani. Swarnalatha was trained to play the harmonium and keyboard. Swarnalatha's family later moved to Bhadravathi in Shivamogga District, Karnataka where she grew up and received her education. She started singing at the age of 3. Surrounded by a family of musicians and music lovers, Swarnalatha was trained in Carnatic and Hindustani music. Her sister Saroja was her first music teacher.

== Career ==
Swarnalatha's family moved to Chennai to seek opportunities in the film industry for her singing talent. The first opportunity came from M. S. Viswanathan in 1987 when she recorded a duet with K. J. Yesudas, "Chinnachiru Kiliye" in the film Neethikku Thandanai. Subsequently, she recorded songs for many other music directors. She also had the opportunity to work with the director P. Venu. She was frequently collaborated with musicians like Ilaiyaraaja and A. R. Rahman. She also recorded a few Hindi songs, the most notable one being "Hai Rama Yeh Kya Hua" from the film Rangeela with singer Hariharan.

In Telugu, she recorded more songs under the music direction of Mani Sharma, Ramana Gogula, Raj–Koti, and Vandemataram Srinivas. They include top-rated songs like Raamma Chilakamma, Osey Ramulamma, and Nizam Babulu. A. R. Rahman employed Swarnalatha for many of his songs. She was one of the most versatile singers of her times, as she was able to sing melodies like "Maalayil Yaaro Manathodu Pesa" from Sathriyan or "Porale Ponnuthayi" from Karuthamma as well as Rahman's experimental songs like "Mukkabla" from Kaadhalan or "Mottu Vittadha" from Pavithra. In Kannada, her first song, "Saradara Baa Baalina Sindhoora" was a duet with actor-singer Dr. Rajkumar for the film Parashuram in 1989.

Swarnalatha was the first female playback singer to fetch the National Award under A. R. Rahman's music direction. She received the award for the song "Porale Ponnuthayi". She recorded many songs with music directors Deva, Vidyasagar, Harris Jayaraj, Anu Malik, Shankar–Ehsaan–Loy, Raj–Koti, Yuvan Shankar Raja, Mani Sharma, Hamsalekha and many others.

She recorded all the songs initially rendered by Lata Mangeshkar and Shamshad Begum for the Tamil movie Anarkali (the dubbed version of the Hindi movie Mughal-e-Azam) and was praised by the Bollywood music director Naushad Ali, which she considered the best moment in her career.

Television

Swarnalatha appeared as a judge in many television singing competitions, notably in the 2001 Vijay TV reality show and in the 2004 Jaya TV Ragamalika.

== Death ==
Swarnalatha died at Malar Hospitals Ltd Adayar, Chennai at the age of 37, on 12 September 2010. She had Idiopathic pulmonary fibrosis.

== Awards and recognitions ==
Awards
Awards	Wins
National Film Awards	1
Tamil Nadu State Film Awards	3
Cinema Express	5
Kalaimamani	1
Total	10

National Award (Silver Lotus Award)-(Rajat Kamal)

- 1994– National Film Award for Best Female Playback Singer for "Porale Ponnuthayi" from Karuththamma

Tamil Nadu State Film Awards

- 1991 – Tamil Nadu State Film Award for Best Female Playback for "Povomma Oorkolam" from Chinna Thambi
- 1994 – Tamil Nadu State Film Award for Best Female Playback for "Porale Ponnuthayi" from Karuththamma
- 2000 – Tamil Nadu State Film Award for Best Female Playback for "Yevano Oruvan" from Alai Payuthey

Cinema Express Awards

- 1991 – Best Female Playback Singer for "Povomma Oorkolam" from Chinna Thambi
- 1995 – Best Female Playback Singer for "Muquala Muqapala" from Kaadhalan
- 1996 – Best Female Playback Singer for "Akkadannu nanga" from Indian
- 1999 – Best Female Playback Singer for "Ulunthu vidaikayile" from Mudhalvan
- 2000 – Best Female Playback Singer for "Yevano Oruvan " from Alai Payuthey

Government Honour

- 1994– Kalaimamani Award by the Government of Tamil Nadu

Recognition

- 2002 – The song "Rakkama Kaiya Thattu" from the movie Thalapathi (1991) was among the songs listed in a BBC World Top Ten music poll. It was performed by S. P. Balasubrahmaniyam and Swarnalatha

== Frequent collaborations ==
Ilaiyaraja

Swarnalatha has sung multiple songs for Ilayaraja and is marked as one of the noted combinations of the 1990's. 'Povomaa Oorkolam' and 'Nee Yengae Enn Anbae' from the film Chinnathambi were hits. Government of Tamil Nadu honoured her with the award of Best Singer for the song "Povomaa Oorkolam". The song 'Raakkamma Kayyathattu' from the film Thalapathi figured in BBC's Hits List of World Songs.

She had sung several experimental songs for Ilayaraja such as "Sollividu VelliNilave', "Kanne Indru Kalyana Kathai" and "Ennai Thottu Allikonda".

A. R. Rahman

A. R. Rahman and Swarnalatha association started from the year 1993. Their combination is known for the magical songs such as "Mukkala Mukkabla", "Hai Rama", and "Thillana Thillana", all of which were chartbuster hit songs of the 1990's. She was the first female singer to receive the National Film Award for Best Female Playback Singer under Rahman's composition for "Porale Ponnuthayi" from Karuthamma (1994). The last song she recorded with Rahman was "Kummi Adi" from Sillunu Oru Kadhal (2006).

Deva

Swarnalatha sang for Deva from the year 1990. The song "Kanne Karisal" from Vaigasi Poranthachu marked their first association. The songs sung by her from the films Senthoorapandi (1993), Rasigan (1994), Baashha (1995), Vishnu (1995), Maanbumigu Maanavan (1996), Kadhal Kottai (1996), Arunachalam (1997), Anantha Poongatre (1999), Mugavaree (2000) and Chokka Thangam (2003) have been popular.
