= 1957 Indian general election in Madras State =

1957 Indian general election in Madras
- 1 March 1957

41 (of 494) seats in the Lok Sabha
- Registered: 17,514,993
- Turnout: 8,363,410 (47.75%) ▼5.23%
	First party	Second party
Leader	K. Kamaraj	M. Kalyanasundaram
Party	INC	CPI
Leader's seat	Did not contest	Did not contest
Seats won	31	2
Seat change	▲5	▲1
Popular vote	5,094,552	1,101,338
Percentage	46.52%	10.06%
Swing	▲4.55%	▲5.09%
- 1957 Indian general election
Prime Minister before election
Jawaharlal Nehru
INC
Prime Minister after election
Jawaharlal Nehru
INC

The 1957 Indian general election polls in Tamil Nadu were held for 34 seats in the state. The result was a victory for Indian National Congress winning 24 out of 34 seats. The major opposition for INC, the CPI, managed to only win 2 seats. This election also saw the entry of Dravida Munnetra Kazhagam in their first national election, who ended up winning 2 seats. Due to the nonrecognition of state parties such as the DMK, they were grouped under independent parties, which won a total of 8 seats.

== Voting and results ==
Party	Votes	%	+/–	Seats	+/–
Indian National Congress	5,094,552	46.52	▲4.55%	31	▲5
Communist Party of India	1,101,338	10.06	▲5.09%	2	▲1
Praja Socialist Party	399,789	3.65	new party	0	new party
Independents	4,355,162	39.77	▲14.82%	8	▲5
Total	10,950,841	100.00	–	41	▲3
Valid votes	8,162,313	97.60			
Invalid/blank votes	201,097	2.40			
Total votes	8,363,410	100.00			
Registered voters/turnout	17,514,993	47.75			

- Changes in seats and votes are calculated based on the seats and votes won and polled in Tamil-speaking areas of Madras (only) during general elections held in 1951
- Independent parties are local state parties (like DMK), that are unrecognised nationally

== List of Elected MPs ==
Constituency		NoS	Winner				Runner-up				Margin	
Constituency		NoS	Candidate	Party	Votes	%	Candidate	Party	Votes	%	Votes	%
1	Madras North	1	S. C. C. Anthony Pillai	IND	86,139	48.71	T. Chengalvarayan	INC	76,141	43.06	9,998	5.65
2	Madras South	1	T. T. Krishnamachari	INC	81,390	45.93	P. Balasubramania Mudaliar	IND	71,284	40.23	10,106	5.70
3	Chingleput	2	Dr. A. Krishnaswamy	IND	1,88,481	26.81	O. V. Alagesa Mudaliar	INC	1,86,753	26.57	N/A	
4	Tiruvallur	1	R. Govindarajulu Naidu	INC	1,20,363	64.90	A. Raghava Reddy	IND	65,083	35.10	55,280	29.80
5	Vellore	2	N. R. Munisamy	INC	1,44,377	19.24	M. Muthukrishnan	INC	1,26,132	16.81	N/A	
6	Thiruvannamalai	1	Dharmalingam	IND	84,309	41.75	G. Neelakantan	INC	74,070	36.68	10,239	5.07
7	Tiruppattur	1	A. Duraisami Gounder	INC	71,564	44.55	C. P. Chinnaraj	IND	42,875	26.69	28,689	17.86
8	Krishnagiri	1	C. R. Narasimhan	INC	57,683	40.00	G. D. Naidu	IND	57,316	39.75	367	0.25
9	Tiruchengode	1	Dr. P. Subbarayan	INC	86,935	57.72	Palaniappa Bakthar	PSP	26,240	17.42	60,695	40.30
10	Salem	1	S. V. Ramasami	INC	85,342	47.18	S. K. Babie Kandasami	IND	30,764	17.01	54,578	30.17
21	Ramanathapuram	1	P. Subbiah Ambalam	INC	89,701	37.61	R. K. Ramakrishnan	IND	50,668	21.24	39,033	16.37
22	Srivilliputhur	2	U. Muthuramalinga Thevar	IND	2,06,999	24.17	S. S. Natarajan	INC	1,67,676	19.58	N/A	
23	Nagercoil	1	Thanulingom Nadar	INC	1,43,288	75.78	Chellaswamy	IND	45,798	24.22	97,490	51.56
24	Tiruchendur	1	T. Ganapathy	INC	Won Uncontested							
25	Tirunelveli	1	P. T. Thanu Pillai	INC	1,05,793	50.75	Sankaranarayana Moopanar	IND	54,319	26.06	51,474	24.69
26	Tenkasi	1	M. Sankarapandian	INC	1,25,821	50.97	N. Shanmugam	CPI	1,21,021	49.03	4,800	1.94
27	Periyakulam	1	R. Narayanasamy	INC	1,16,715	50.11	Muthia	IND	64,867	27.85	51,848	22.26
28	Madurai	1	K. T. K. Thangamani	CPI	79,374	35.02	T. K. Rama	INC	78,286	34.54	1,088	0.48
29	Dindigul	2	M. Ghulam Mohideen	INC	2,25,510	27.99	S. C. Balakrishna	INC	1,70,995	21.22	N/A	
30	Pollachi	1	P. R. Ramakrishnan	INC	1,39,984	53.10	Gurusami Aicker	PSP	1,23,618	46.90	16,366	6.20
31	Namakkal	2	E. V. K. Sampath	IND	1,82,066	23.80	S. R. Arumugam	INC	1,64,221	21.47	N/A	
32	Gobichettipalayam	1	Ramasami Gounder	INC	1,15,365	60.69	Jothinath Singh	CPI	74,734	39.31	40,631	21.38
33	Coimbatore	1	Parvati	CPI	1,10,454	47.76	P. S. Rangasami	INC	95,442	41.27	15,012	6.49
34	Nilgiris	1	C. Nanjappan	INC	1,22,388	59.16	P. S. Bharathi	IND	56,754	27.43	65,634	31.73

== See also ==
- Elections in Tamil Nadu

== Bibliography ==
- Volume I, 1957 Indian general election, 2nd Lok Sabha
