= T. P. M. Mohideen Khan =

Indian politician

Minister for Environment in Tamil Nadu and Member of Tamil Nadu Legislative Assembly
- In office 13 May 2006 – 15 May 2011
- Chief Minister: M. Karunanidhi

Member of the Tamil Nadu Legislative Assembly
- In office 13 May 2001 — 2 May 2021
- Preceded by: Mohamed Kodar Maideen
- Succeeded by: M. Abdul Wahab
- Constituency: Palayamkottai

Personal details
- Born: 1947 (age 78–79)
- Party: DMK

T. P. M. Mohideen Khan (born in Tirunelveli on 19 July 1947) is the former minister for environment in the state of Tamil Nadu in India. He was a member of the Tamil Nadu Legislative Assembly, representing the Palayamkottai assembly constituency where he has been elected four times between 2001 and 2021. His political party is the Dravida Munnetra Kazhagam party.

== Career ==
Khan began his career as a businessman. He was inspired by Dravidian movement run by C. N. Annadurai and M. Karunanidhi, founder and leader of Dravida Munnetra Kazhagam, which was conducted all over Tamil Nadu to oppose Hindi as an official language in the state. He joined the Dravida Munnetra Kazhagam as a volunteer and was involved in many train and bus strikes.

When Dravida Munnetra Kazhagam came to power, Khan was given many positions and, in 2001, he was the Palayamkottai candidate. He was elected to the Tamil Nadu legislative assembly and still holds the position. In 2006, Dravida Munnetra Kazhagam won the election and he was made minister for the environment.

== Controversy ==
In 2010, he left a police officer who was attacked by gangsters to die on the road without providing immediate help even though he had a convoy of cars with him. Along with the minister for health, M. R. K. Panneerselvam, he did not get out of their car for 20 minutes and stood there as a mere witness to this incident.
