= Aladi Aruna =

Indian politician (1933–2004)

V. Arunachalam Nadar

Minister of Law, Government of Tamil Nadu
- In office 13 May 1996 – 13 May 2001
- Chief Minister: M. Karunanidhi

Member of Parliament, Rajya Sabha
- In office 25 July 1983 – 24 July 1989
- Constituency: Tamil Nadu

Member of Parliament, Lok Sabha
- In office 1977–1980
- Preceded by: S. A. Muruganantham
- Succeeded by: D. S. A. Sivaprakasam
- Constituency: Tirunelveli

Member of Tamil Nadu Legislative Assembly
- In office 1996–2001
- Preceded by: S. S. Ramasubbu
- Succeeded by: P. G. Rajendran Nadar
- In office 1967–1977
- Preceded by: S. Chellapandian
- Succeeded by: V. Karuppasamy Pandian
- Constituency: Alangulam

Personal details
- Born: 9 July 1933 Aladipatti, Tirunelveli, Madras Presidency, British India (Now Tamil Nadu, India)
- Died: 31 December 2004 (aged 71) Alangulam, Tirunelveli, India
- Cause of death: Assassination
- Party: Dravida Munnetra Kazhagam
- Other political affiliations: All India Anna Dravida Munnetra Kazhagam
- Spouse: Kamala
- Children: Five sons and Poongothai Aladi Aruna
- Parent(s): Vaithiyalingam Nadar and Pathirakaaliyammal
- Education: St. John's College, Palayamkottai, Madras Law College

Aladi Aruna (alias V. Arunachalam Nadar) (9 July 1933 - 31 December 2004) was an Indian politician. He was the Law Minister of Tamil Nadu. He was elected to the Tamil Nadu legislative assembly as a member of the Dravida Munnetra Kazhagam from Alangulam constituency in the 1967, 1971 and 1996 elections. He was elected to the Lok Sabha, the lower house of India's Parliament, from Tirunelveli constituency in the 1977 elections. He was also a member of the Rajya Sabha, the upper house of India's Parliament, as a member of the Anna Dravida Munnetra Kazhagam. He came into the limelight when he issued a dissent note in the JPC report on the Bofors Scandal against a clean chit to the Rajiv Gandhi government. He was hacked to death during a morning walk in 2004.

== Personal life ==
Aladipatti Arunachalam Nadar, alias Aladi Aruna, was born in Aladipatti, a village about 30 kilometres from Tirunelveli, to Vaithiyalingam Nadar and Pathirakaaliyammal. His father was a farmer and also owned a provisions store. He was the eldest son in the family with two brothers and two sisters.

After his primary school education in Aladipatti, he completed his high school education from Tirunelveli. He graduated in B.A. (Economics) from St. John's College, Palayamkottai, Tirunelveli and received a Bachelor of Law degree from Madras Law College.

He was married to Kamala with whom he had five sons and a daughter. His daughter, Poongothai Aladi Aruna, followed him into politics.

He founded Einstein College of Engineering in Tamil Nadu in 2004 and was also instrumental in the success of Dhanalakshmi Higher Secondary School established in 1913, a 100-year school in North Chennai.

== Political career ==
Though born into a family that traditionally held the priestdom of the famous Vaithiyalingasamy Kovil in Aladipatti, he was strongly influenced by the rationalist movement spearheaded by Periyar and greatly enchanted with the silver-tongued oratory of C. N. Annadurai and M. Karunanidhi. These influences soon became his guiding forces and he entered the political movement even as a young student and actively participated in the "Anti-Hindi agitation". His book "Hindi Egathipathiyam" is considered a treatise on the movement.

He started his political career by unsuccessfully contesting in the Assembly elections from Alangulam as a Dravida Munnetra Kazhagam (DMK) candidate in 1962. He was later elected to the Assembly on two occasions in 1967 and 1971 as a DMK candidate. He was greatly responsible for the organisation of cooperatives for the beedi workers during this period. He also won Lok Sabha election in 1977 from Tirunelveli.

He later joined the Anna Dravida Munnetra Kazhagam and was elected to the Lok Sabha, from Tirunelveli and later M. G. Ramachandran nominated him to the Rajya Sabha from Tamil Nadu in 1984. He also served as the leader of the AIADMK in the Rajya Sabha. During this tenure, he served as a member of the Joint Parliament Committee that probed the Bofors scandal. He raised a dissent note on the report of the Joint Parliamentary Committee which examined the Bofors Scam, which was a death-knell to the Rajiv Gandhi government. Aladi Aruna's comment in the dissent note said "The son (Rajiv Gandhi) has surpassed mother (Indira Gandhi) in corruption and abuse of power".

After the death of Ramachandran, he rejoined the DMK and was appointed its spokesperson. He was the first person to hold office as spokesperson in the DMK.

He became a Law Minister of Tamil Nadu after winning the assembly election contesting as a DMK candidate in 1996. He was instrumental in the establishment of the law university in Chennai and setting up the High Court branch in Madurai, bringing a law college to Tirunelveli.

== Electoral performance ==
2001 Tamil Nadu Legislative Assembly election : Alangulam
Party	Candidate	Votes	%	±%
AIADMK	P. G. Rajendran	58,498	48.95	New
DMK	Aladi Aruna	54,387	45.51	▼0.59
MDMK	S. S. Krishnasamy	3,320	2.78	▼9.58
Independent	S. Vaikuntam	1,561	1.31	
Independent	P. Ravi Kumar	821	0.69	
Margin of victory		4,111	3.44	▼17.58
Turnout		119,555	65.37	▼7.55
Total valid votes		119,509		
Rejected ballots		46	0.04	▼5.33
Registered electors		182,877		▲9.05
AIADMK gain from DMK		Swing	▲2.85	

1996 Tamil Nadu Legislative Assembly election : Alangulam
Party	Candidate	Votes	%	±%
DMK	Aladi Aruna	53,374	46.10	▲12.71
INC	M. S. Kamaraj	29,038	25.08	▼37.61
MDMK	M. P. Murugiah	14,309	12.36	New
AIIC(T)	S. S. Ramasubbu	6,475	5.59	New
BJP	S. V. Anburaj	3,236	2.80	New
Independent	I. Poolpandian	2,186	1.89	
Independent	S. Murugiah @ Murugiah Pandian	1,500	1.30	
Independent	S. Shunmugaih Pandian	864	0.75	
Margin of victory		24,336	21.02	▼8.29
Turnout		122,293	72.92	▲3.47
Total valid votes		115,771		
Rejected ballots		6,563	5.37	▲2.30
Registered electors		167,697		▲6.21
DMK gain from INC		Swing	▼16.59	

1989 Tamil Nadu Legislative Assembly election : Alangulam
Party	Candidate	Votes	%	±%
INC	S. S. Ramasubbu	31,314	28.57	New
DMK	M. P. Murugiah	30,832	28.13	▼2.54
AIADMK	V. Karuppasamy Pandian	23,964	21.87	New
AIADMK	Aladi Aruna	20,867	19.04	New
Margin of victory		482	0.44	▼23.38
Turnout		111,933	79.43	▲3.67
Total valid votes		109,598		
Rejected ballots		2,335	2.09	▼4.61
Registered electors		140,927		▲12.82
INC gain from AIADMK		Swing	▼25.92	

== DMK ==
He participated in and led various agitations against Hindi during 1962 - 1967, was imprisoned for more than a year during that Anti Hindi Movement. He organized Beedi rollers of Tirunelveli to come under a forum. It is his efforts that got the beedi rollers separate ID cards and getting benefits from State and Central Governments. He was always a star speaker in all meetings and conferences. Never in his political life accused of any allegations in any form. Even the opposition political party leader admired him for his honesty, integrity and service. He was suspended from DMK party for alleged anti-party activities. He accused the party of sidelining those who oppose M. K. Stalin emerging as a potential candidate for Chief Minister. He also said that Stalin was unfit to become Chief Minister or lead the party headed by stalwarts such as C. N. Annadurai and M. Karunanidhi.

== Books ==
Aladi Aruna was one of the foremost Dravidian writers in English. He has authored several books in English and Tamil. He has written several books on varied topics. Unfederal Features of the Indian Constitution is notable among his books Defend Our Rights - which discusses center state relationship Voice for the States - A compilation of his various speeches in Parliament. He was the editor of weekly "Ennam" .

His other works in Tamil include,

- Hindi Egathipathiyam (இந்தி ஏகாதிபத்தியம்)history of Anti Hindi Agitation Movement
- Aladi Aruna Sirukathaigal (ஆலடி அருணா சிறுகதைகள்) his writings in Ennam News Magazines
- Inthiya Arasiyal Amaippum koothachiyum (இந்திய அரசியல் அமைப்பும் கூட்டாட்சியும் )
- Kamarajar oru vazhikatti (காமராஜர் ஒரு வழிகாட்டி).
- Incomplete works on Moondru muthalvargaludan naan

== Death ==
Aladi Aruna was murdered during a morning walk near Alangulam, in Tenkasi district on 31 December 2004. He was 71. His friend R. Ponraj who also accompanied him was killed and Socrates, TASMAC bar attendant from Aladipatti survived the attack.

=== Trial ===
According to police, Aruna was attacked by a gang instructed by his friend and local educationist S. A. Raja, with whom he had fallen out over setting up of educational institutions in the southern districts of Tamil Nadu. Raja was arrested in January 2005 but was bailed by the Supreme Court of India in July 2006. The district court acquitted Raja on 15 April 2008. The High Court reversed the verdict on 5 August 2009. The Supreme Court then again acquitted and released him on 30 July 2010, writing that the high court could not establish that he was guilty.

Two of the accused, Balamurugan and Azhagar, were convicted in Tirunelveli principal sessions court and sentenced to death in April 2008. A third, Veldurai, was convicted for a violation of the Arms Act and sentenced to three years in prison. Six others were acquitted, including Raja.
