= M. Shanmugaiah Pandian =

Indian politician

M. Shanmugaiah Pandian is an Indian politician and former Member of the Legislative Assembly. He was elected to the Tamil Nadu legislative assembly as an Anna Dravida Munnetra Kazhagam candidate from Alangulam constituency in 1984 election.

== Electoral performance ==
1984 Tamil Nadu Legislative Assembly election: Alangulam
Party	Candidate	Votes	%	±%
AIADMK	N. Shanmugaiah Pandian	48,109	54.49%	New
DMK	P. Thambi Thura	27,076	30.67%	−14.48
Independent	T. Sekar	5,922	6.71%	New
Independent	S. P. Emarajan	3,866	4.38%	New
Independent	N. Thangaraj Pandian	2,448	2.77%	New
Independent	M. Rayappan	548	0.62%	New
Margin of victory		21,033	23.82%	15.10%
Turnout		88,294	75.76%	8.46%
Registered electors		124,914		
AIADMK gain from GKC		Swing	0.61%	
