= K. R. P. Prabakaran =

Indian politician

Member of the India Parliament for Tirunelveli
- In office 1 September 2014 – 29 May 2019
- Preceded by: S. S. Ramasubbu
- Succeeded by: S. Gnanathiraviam
- Constituency: Tirunelveli

Personal details
- Born: 5 September 1980 (age 46) Keelapavoor, Tenkasi, Tamil Nadu
- Party: All India Anna Dravida Munnetra Kazhagam
- Spouse: Smt. P. Sudhana
- Children: 2
- Parent: K.R.Paul Durai - Janaki
- Education: Central Law College, Salem
- Occupation: Advocate
- As of 17 December, 2016

K R Paul Durai Prabakaran (b 1979) is an Indian politician and Member of Parliament elected from Tamil Nadu. He is elected to the Lok Sabha from Tirunelveli constituency as an Anna Dravida Munnetra Kazhagam candidate in 2014 election.

He is a lawyer, and hails from Keezhapavoor in Alangulam taluk of Tirunelveli district(Now, Tenkasi district).
