= S. Xavier =

Indian politician, lawyer, and trade union leader

Member of Parliament (Lok Sabha) for Tirunelveli
- In office 1967–1971
- Prime Minister: Indira Gandhi
- Preceded by: None

Personal details
- Born: 1920
- Died: 6 December 2009 (aged 88–89)
- Party: Swatantra Party
- Profession: Politician

S. Xavier (1920 – 6 December 2009) was a lawyer, trade union leader and Swatantra party politician from the Indian state of Tamil Nadu. He served as the Member of Lok Sabha for Tirunelveli from 1967 to 1971 and expired on 6 December 2009.

== Early life ==
Xavier was born in the year 1920. He graduated in 1941 and entered government service the very same year. He studied law and graduated as a lawyer in 1952 and started practising from 1953 onwards. Xavier lead various trade unions and worker's organisations in Madras state.

== Politics ==
Xavier took an active interest in politics and joined the Swatantra party established by C. Rajagopalachari in 1959. He contested in the 1967 elections from Tirunelveli and was elected to the Lok Sabha.
