= M. Abdul Wahab =

Indian politician

Member of the Tamil Nadu Legislative Assembly
- Incumbent
- Assumed office 12 May 2021
- Preceded by: T. P. M. Mohideen Khan
- Constituency: Palayamkottai

Personal details
- Born: January 22, 1967 (age 59)
- Party: Dravida Munnetra Kazhagam
- Education: B. Com

M. Abdul Wahab is an Indian politician who is a Member of Legislative Assembly of Tamil Nadu. He was elected from Palayamkottai as a Dravida Munnetra Kazhagam candidate in 2021.

== Electoral performance ==
Election	Party	Constituency Name	Result	Votes gained	Vote share%
2021	Dravida Munnetra Kazhagam	Palayamkottai	Won	89,117	55.89%
