= Poongothai Aladi Aruna =

Indian politician

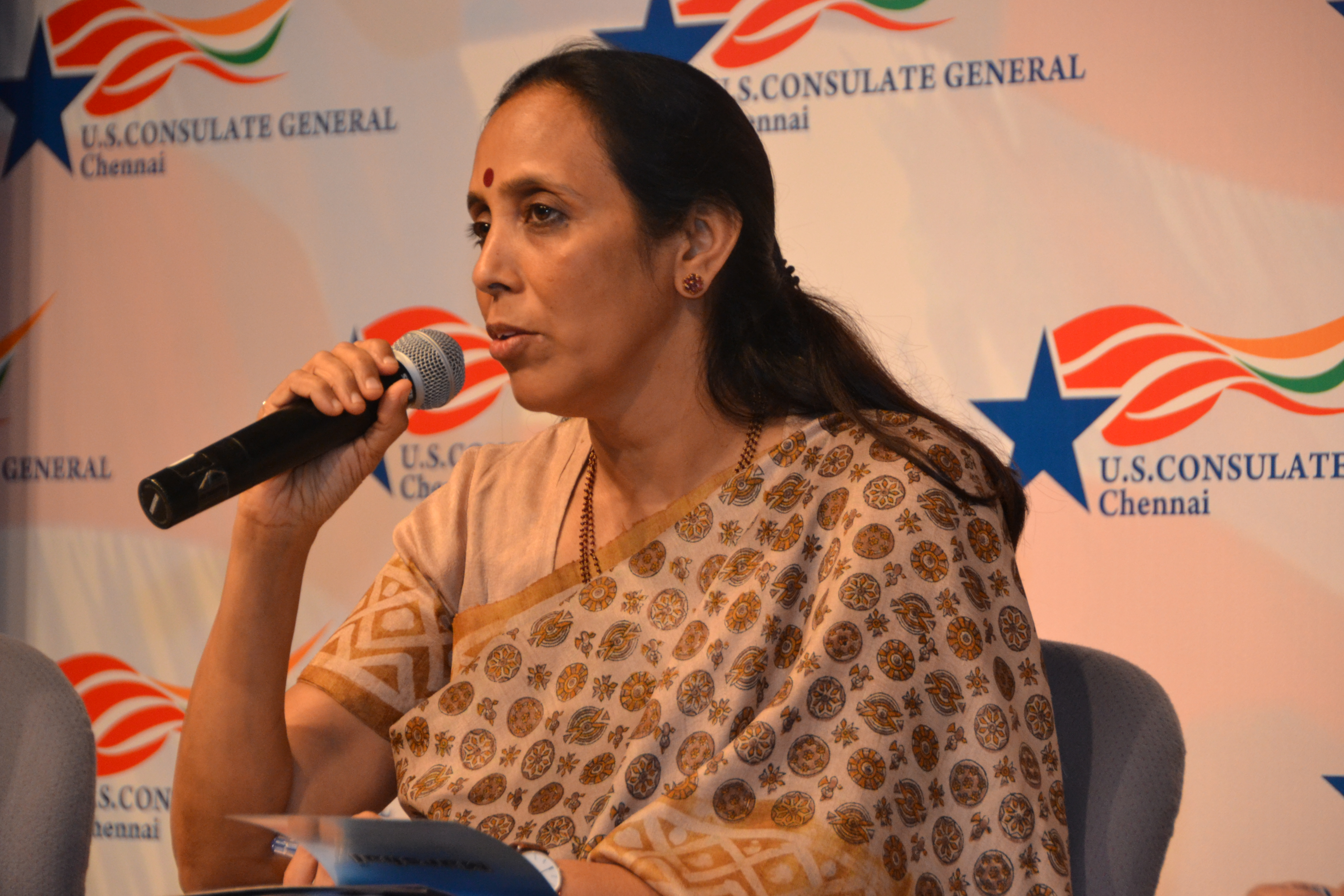
- Poongothai Aladi Aruna at the U.S. Consulate General in Chennai

Minister for Social Welfare and Nutritious Noon Meal Programme
- In office 13 May 2006 – 20 May 2008
- Preceded by: P. Vijayalakshmi
- Succeeded by: Geetha Jeevan

Minister for Information Technology
- In office 28 February 2009 – 15 May 2011
- Preceded by: M. Karunanidhi
- Succeeded by: R. B. Udhaya Kumar

Member of Legislative Assembly
- In office 25 May 2016 – 6 May 2021
- Preceded by: P. G. Rajendran
- Succeeded by: P. H. Manoj Pandian
- Constituency: Alangulam
- In office 11 May 2006 – 13 May 2011
- Preceded by: P. G. Rajendran
- Succeeded by: P. G. Rajendran
- Constituency: Alangulam

Personal details
- Born: 28 October 1964 (age 61) Chennai, Tamil Nadu
- Party: DMK
- Spouse: V. Balaji
- Parent(s): Aladi Aruna; Kamala
- Occupation: Gynaecologist, politician
- As of 23 February, 2018

Poongothai Aladi Aruna is an Indian politician and former Information and Technology minister of Tamil Nadu under DMK ruling in 2006–2011. In 2016 Tamil Nadu assembly election she contested from Alangulam (State Assembly Constituency) and won the election with 88891 votes.

== Personal life ==
She is the daughter of the late DMK minister Aladi Aruna. She was born in Chennai on 28 October 1964. She is a gynaecologist by profession and received part of her education in London. She married Balaji Venugopal in the late 1980s. They have two daughters, Samantha and Kavya.

== Electoral performance ==
She was given a ticket to contest elections after her father's death. She was elected to the Tamil Nadu legislative assembly as a Dravida Munnetra Kazhagam candidate from Alangulam constituency in 2006 elections. She later went on to become Social Welfare minister in the then Tamil Nadu government.

2021 Tamil Nadu Legislative Assembly election : Alangulam
Party	Candidate	Votes	%	±%
AIADMK	P. H. Manoj Pandian	74,153	36.77	▼6.75
DMK	Dr. Poongothai Aladi Aruna	70,614	35.01	▼10.97
Independent	A. Hari Nadar	37,727	18.71	
DMDK	Rajendranathan	2,816	1.40	▼2.63
NOTA	None of the above	1,786	0.89	▼0.19
MNM	S. Selvakumar	1,454	0.72	New
Margin of victory		3,539	1.75	▼0.71
Turnout		203,484	78.06	▼1.05
Total valid votes		201,692		
Rejected ballots		6	0.00	▼0.08
Registered electors		260,688		▲6.58
AIADMK gain from DMK		Swing	▼9.21	

2016 Tamil Nadu Legislative Assembly election : Alangulam
Party	Candidate	Votes	%	±%
DMK	Dr. Poongothai Aladi Aruna	88,891	45.98	▼1.13
AIADMK	Hepzi Karthikeyan	84,137	43.52	▼3.77
DMDK	Rajendranathan	7,784	4.03	New
BJP	S. V. Anburaj	4,660	2.41	▲0.80
NOTA	None of the above	2,089	1.08	New
Margin of victory		4,754	2.46	▲2.28
Turnout		193,488	79.11	▲79.11
Total valid votes		193,326		
Rejected ballots		162	0.08	
Registered electors		244,588		▲20.00
DMK gain from AIADMK		Swing	▼1.31	

2011 Tamil Nadu Legislative Assembly election : Alangulam
Party	Candidate	Votes	%	±%
AIADMK	P. G. Rajendran	78,098	47.29	▲6.30
DMK	Dr. Poongothai Aladi Aruna	77,799	47.11	▲1.06
BJP	S. Sudalaiyandi	2,664	1.61	▲0.01
BSP	E. Murugesan	1,234	0.75	▼4.14
Independent	N. Rajendran	1,099	0.67	
Independent	S. Thanga Raja	1,058	0.64	
Margin of victory		299	0.18	▼4.88
Total valid votes		165,134		
Registered electors		203,826		▲11.17
AIADMK gain from DMK		Swing	▲1.24	

2006 Tamil Nadu Legislative Assembly election : Alangulam
Party	Candidate	Votes	%	±%
DMK	Dr. Poongothai Aladi Aruna	62,299	46.05	▲0.54
AIADMK	M. Pandiaraj	55,454	40.99	New
BSP	M. Sivakumar	6,620	4.89	New
AIFB	P. Samynathan	4,664	3.45	New
DMDK	Muthu Kumarasamy @ K. Durai	2,751	2.03	New
BJP	M. Arulselvan	2,170	1.60	New
Independent	A. Meeran	1,336	0.99	
Margin of victory		6,845	5.06	▲1.62
Turnout		135,689	74.01	▲8.64
Total valid votes		135,294		
Registered electors		183,349		▲0.26
DMK gain from AIADMK		Swing	▼2.90	

== Social Welfare Minister ==
During her tenure as the Social Welfare Minister, Chief Minister Kalaignar M Karunanidhi announced the Two Egg scheme in the midday meals and now it is three times a day. The physically challenged people were given high priority during this period to the extent of a complete survey, National ID Card, Government benefits and motorised vehicles. She had submitted her resignation on 14 May 2008 following a controversy over her telephone conversation with the Director of Vigilance and Anti-Corruption S.K. Upadhyay about a corruption case involving her relative.

== IT Minister ==
On 28 February 2009 Poongathai Aladi Aruna was reinstated as Minister for Information Technology to the Government of Tamil Nadu. This is first time that Tamil Nadu Govt. has a separate minister for Information Technology.

== Scandal ==
In an audio CD released by Janata party president Subramanian Swamy on 13 May 2008, Poongothai is pleading with the Director of Vigilance and Anti-corruption, SK Upadhyay to be soft on her relative, Jawahar. Jawahar is an electrical engineer in the Tamil Nadu electricity board and was caught accepting bribes. She later confirmed that the voice in that tape is really hers and resigned from office accepting responsibility.
