= Kadambur R. Janarthanan =

Indian politician (1929–2020)

Kadambur M. R. Janarthanan
- Born: 22 October 1929; Kadambur, Madras State, British India (present day Tamil Nadu, India)
- Died: 26 December 2020 (aged 91); Thoothukudi, Tamil Nadu, India
- Political party: All India Anna Dravida Munnetra Kazhagam

Kadambur M. R. Janarthanan (22 October 1929 – 26 December 2020) was a union minister of India and a leader of All India Anna Dravida Munnetra Kazhagam (AIADMK). He was union Minister of State, Ministry of Personnel, Public Grievances and Pensions with additional Charge of minister of State for Finance (Revenue, Banking and Insurance). He held these portfolios in Second Vajpayee Ministry from 1998 to 1999.

He was born on 22 October 1929 in Kadambur village in Thoothukudi district in Tamil Nadu and became science graduate from Presidency College of Madras University. He was agriculturist and trader by profession. He was imprisoned under MISA in 1976 in the emergency.

He was first elected to the Lok Sabha in 1984 from Tirunelveli and then again to the 9th, 10th and 12th Lok Sabha.

Janarathanan was a short story writer and won Odum Railil Oruvan (short story in Tamil) in Ananda Vikatan short story competition.

== Electoral career ==
=== Lok Sabha Elections Contested ===
Elections	Constituency	Party	Result	Vote percentage	Opposition Candidate	Opposition Party	Opposition vote percentage
1984 Indian general election	Tirunelveli	AIADMK	Won	57.64	D. S. A. Sivaprakasam	DMK	40.95
1989 Indian general election	Tirunelveli	AIADMK	Won	65.01	D. S. A. Sivaprakasam	DMK	33.51
1991 Indian general election	Tirunelveli	AIADMK	Won	62.09	K. P. Kandasamy	DMK	34.92
1998 Indian general election	Tirunelveli	AIADMK	Won	41.44	R. Sarathkumar	DMK	40.29
