= S. A. Muruganantham =

S. A. Muruganantham (10 April 1926) was an Indian politician and a leader of the Communist Party of India (CPI). He was a member of the 5th Lok Sabha, representing the Tirunelveli constituency, Tamil Nadu.
