= P. G. Rajendran =

Indian politician

P. G. Rajendran is an Indian politician and incumbent Member of the Legislative Assembly from Alangulam constituency. He was previously elected to the Tamil Nadu legislative assembly as an Anna Dravida Munnetra Kazhagam candidate from the same Alangulam constituency in 2001 election.

He is called as PGR with the known people. He is from village called Thayarthoppu in Veerakeralampudur panchayat (near Surandai) from Tirunelveli District. He contested for Assembly twice in Alangulam and won on both occasions, first time -2001 defeated Aladi Aruna (former law minister), second time-2011 defeated Pongathai (former IT minister as well daughter of Aladi Aruna).

== Electoral performance ==
2011 Tamil Nadu Legislative Assembly election: Alangulam
Party	Candidate	Votes	%	±%
AIADMK	P. G. Rajendran	78,098	47.29%	+6.31
DMK	Dr. Poongothai Aladi Aruna	77,799	47.11%	+1.07
BJP	S. Sudalaiyandi	2,664	1.61%	+0.01
BSP	E. Murugesan	1,234	0.75%	−4.15
Independent	N. Rajendran	1,099	0.67%	New
Independent	S. Thanga Raja	1,058	0.64%	New
Independent	R. Ramalingam	924	0.56%	New
Margin of victory		299	0.18%	−4.88%
Turnout		165,134	81.02%	7.23%
Registered electors		203,826		
AIADMK gain from DMK		Swing	1.25%	

2001 Tamil Nadu Legislative Assembly election: Alangulam
Party	Candidate	Votes	%	±%
AIADMK	P. G. Rajendran	58,498	48.95%	New
DMK	Aladi Aruna	54,387	45.51%	−0.59
MDMK	S. S. Krishnasamy	3,320	2.78%	−9.58
Independent	S. Vaikuntam	1,561	1.31%	New
Independent	P. Ravi Kumar	821	0.69%	New
Margin of victory		4,111	3.44%	−17.58%
Turnout		119,509	65.37%	−7.55%
Registered electors		182,877		
AIADMK gain from DMK		Swing	2.85%	
