= Veluchamy Thevar =

Indian politician

Veluchamy Thevar was an Indian politician and former Member of the Legislative Assembly. He was elected to the Tamil Nadu legislative assembly as an independent candidate from Alangulam constituency in 1957 election.

== Electoral performance ==
1957 Madras State Legislative Assembly election : Alangulam
Party	Candidate	Votes	%	±%
Independent	Veluchamy Thevar	19,458	51.64	
INC	S. Chellapandian	15,362	40.77	▲8.20
Independent	Ambalavana Pillai	2,858	7.59	
Margin of victory		4,096	10.87	▲1.98
Turnout		37,678	39.70	▼14.07
Total valid votes		37,678		
Registered electors		94,908		▲23.72
Independent gain from INC		Swing	▲19.07	
