= C. Robert Bruce =

Indian politician

Member of Parliament, Lok Sabha
- Incumbent
- Assumed office 4 June 2024
- Preceded by: S. Gnanathiraviam
- Constituency: Tirunelveli

Personal details
- Born: 27 May 1962 (age 64) Tamil Nadu
- Party: INC
- Children: 2
- Parent(s): Chellapan, Star Queen
- Occupation: Politician

Chellapan Robert Bruce from Kanyakumari dist, is an Indian politician. He is set to be a member of the 18th Lok Sabha representing the Tirunelveli constituency in the state of Tamil Nadu and the Indian National Congress (INC).

== Political career ==
Bruce was elected to the Lok Sabha, lower house of the Parliament of India from Tirunelveli, Tamil Nadu in the 2024 Indian general election as member of the Indian National Congress.
