= R. Navaneetha Krishna Pandian =

Indian politician

R. Navaneetha Krishna Pandian was an Indian politician and former Member of the Legislative Assembly. He was elected to the Tamil Nadu legislative assembly as a Gandhi Kamaraj Congress Party candidate from Alangulam constituency in 1980 election.

== Electoral performance ==
1980 Tamil Nadu Legislative Assembly election: Alangulam
Party	Candidate	Votes	%	±%
GKC	R. Navaneetha Krishna Pandian	41,271	53.88%	New
DMK	E. Dorai Singh	34,587	45.15%	+28.82
Independent	M. Rayappan Nadar	504	0.66%	New
Margin of victory		6,684	8.73%	6.13%
Turnout		76,604	67.29%	4.40%
Registered electors		115,519		
GKC gain from AIADMK		Swing	25.44%	

1977 Tamil Nadu Legislative Assembly election: Alangulam
Party	Candidate	Votes	%	±%
AIADMK	V. Karuppasamy Pandian	20,183	28.43%	New
JP	R. Navaneetha Krishna Pandian	18,342	25.84%	New
INC	S. Ukkirama Pandian	17,997	25.35%	−23.36
DMK	P. Thambi Durai	11,592	16.33%	−34.96
Independent	S. Arulappan Nadar	1,024	1.44%	New
AIFB	T. Thirumaran	861	1.21%	New
Independent	S. Subbiah Thevar	663	0.93%	New
Margin of victory		1,841	2.59%	0.01%
Turnout		70,987	62.89%	−15.40%
Registered electors		114,602		
AIADMK gain from DMK		Swing	-22.86%	
