= Karuppasamy Pandian =

Indian politician (1948–2025)

Personal details
- Born: 1 July 1947 Thiruthu Tirunelveli, Tamil Nadu, India
- Died: 26 March 2025 (aged 77) Thiruthu, Tamil Nadu, India
- Party: All India Anna Dravida Munnetra Kazhagam

V. Karuppasamy Pandian (1 July 1947 – 26 March 2025) was an Indian politician and a former Member of the Legislative Assembly in Tamil Nadu. He served as the Organising Secretary of the All India Anna Dravida Munnetra Kazhagam (AIADMK) from 2020 until his death in 2025. A senior leader from Tirunelveli district, he was known for his long-standing association with the party and his role in its organisational structure.

== Career ==
Pandian was a supporter of All India Anna Dravida Munnetra Kazhagam (AIADMK) founder and former Chief Minister, M. G. Ramachandran. Both Ramachandran and party general secretary Jayalalithaa appointed him to various party roles from 1972, culminating in him becoming deputy general secretary of the party in 1996.

Pandian was elected to the Tamil Nadu Legislative Assembly as an AIADMK candidate from Alangulam constituency in the 1977 elections. He was re-elected, this time from the Palayamkottai constituency, in the 1980 elections.

In 2000, Pandian was expelled from the AIADMK by Jayalalithaa. He joined the rival Dravida Munnetra Kazhagam (DMK) on 2 May 2000, was given various posts by that party and had hopes of obtaining a state-level post within it. In the 2006 elections, he was successful in contesting as a DMK candidate in the Tenkasi constituency.

After being suspended from the DMK in May 2015 after allegedly attempting to have his son appointed to an official post within the party, Pandian remained silent for a while before being readmitted to the AIADMK on 26 July 2016 by Jayalalithaa. He had frequently severely criticised Jayalalithaa during his DMK membership but after his expulsion had heaped praise upon her. After her death in December 2016, V. K. Sasikala appointed him as one of the organising secretaries of the party. He resigned the post in February 2017 in protest against Sasikala's appointment of T. T. V. Dhinakaran as party deputy general secretary. He said, "I cannot digest the appointment of a person, who was removed from the party by Jayalalithaa in 2011 after branding him as 'traitor', as the deputy general secretary." He rejoined AIADMK on 5 January 2020. He was appointed an Organizing secretary of AIADMK on 25 July 2020. He accepted the leadership of AIADMK General Secretary under Edappadi K. Palaniswami.

== Death ==
On 26 March 2025, Pandian died at his residence at Thiruththu near Palayamkottai. He was 77.

== Electoral career ==
=== Tamil Nadu Legislative Assembly elections contested ===
Elections	Constituency	Party	Result	Vote percentage	Opposition Candidate	Opposition Party	Opposition vote percentage
1977 Tamil Nadu Legislative Assembly election	Alangulam	AIADMK	Won	28.43	R. Navaneetha Krishna Pandian	JP	25.84
1980 Tamil Nadu Legislative Assembly election	Palayamkottai	AIADMK	Won	57.96	Suba Seetharaman	DMK	42.04
1984 Tamil Nadu Legislative Assembly election	Palayamkottai	AIADMK	Lost	47.09	V. S. T. Shamsulalam	DMK	51.92
1989 Tamil Nadu Legislative Assembly election	Alangulam	AIADMK(J)	Lost	21.87	S. S. Ramasubbu	INC	28.57
1991 Tamil Nadu Legislative Assembly election	Palayamkottai	Thayaga Marumalarchi Kazhagam	Lost	39.07	P. Dharamalingam	AIADMK	46.11
2001 Tamil Nadu Legislative Assembly election	Tenkasi	DMK	Lost	44.18	K. Annamalai	AIADMK	51.41
2006 Tamil Nadu Legislative Assembly election	Tenkasi	DMK	Won	49.98	Rama. Udayasuriyan	MDMK	36.61
2011 Tamil Nadu Legislative Assembly election	Tenkasi	DMK	Lost	40.78	R. Sarathkumar	AISMK	54.30
