= Palayamkottai Assembly constituency =

One of the 234 State Legislative Assembly Constituencies in Tamil Nadu, in India

Coordinates: 8.7166°N 77.7333°E

Palayamkottai
- Constituency No. 226 for the Tamil Nadu Legislative Assembly

Constituency details
- Country: India
- Region: South India
- State: Tamil Nadu
- District: Tirunelveli
- Lok Sabha constituency: Tirunelveli
- Established: 1977
- Total electors: 2,57,498

Member of Legislative Assembly
- 17th Tamil Nadu Legislative Assembly
- Incumbent M. Abdul Wahab
- Party: DMK
- Alliance: SPA
- Elected year: 2026

Palayamkottai is an assembly constituency located in Tirunelveli district in Tamil Nadu. It falls under Tirunelveli Lok Sabha constituency. It is one of the 234 State Legislative Assembly Constituencies in Tamil Nadu, in India.

== Members of Legislative Assembly ==
Year	Member	Political party
1977	Nanjil K. Manoharan	All India Anna Dravida Munnetra Kazhagam
1980	V. Karuppasamy Pandian	All India Anna Dravida Munnetra Kazhagam
1984	V. S. T. Shamsulalam	Dravida Munnetra Kazhagam
1989	S. Gurunathan	Dravida Munnetra Kazhagam
1991	P. Dharmalingam	All India Anna Dravida Munnetra Kazhagam
1996	Mohamed Kodar Maideen	Dravida Munnetra Kazhagam
2001	T. P. M. Mohideen Khan	Dravida Munnetra Kazhagam
2006	T. P. M. Mohideen Khan	Dravida Munnetra Kazhagam
2011	T. P. M. Mohideen Khan	Dravida Munnetra Kazhagam
2016	T. P. M. Mohideen Khan	Dravida Munnetra Kazhagam
2021	M. Abdul Wahab	Dravida Munnetra Kazhagam
2026	M. Abdul Wahab	Dravida Munnetra Kazhagam

== Election results ==
Vote share of winning candidates
2026	44.15%
2021	55.32%
2016	43.62%
2011	42.76%
2006	57.16%
2001	53.13%
1996	62.98%
1991	46.11%
1989	34.41%
1984	51.92%
1980	57.96%
1977	44.10%

=== 2026 ===
2026 Tamil Nadu Legislative Assembly election: Palayamkottai
Party	Candidate	Votes	%	±%
DMK	M. Abdul Wahab	79,744	44.15	▼11.74
TVK	Maria John	65,939	36.51	New
AIADMK	Syed Sulthan Samsudeen	19,732	10.92	▼12.27
NOTA	NOTA	851	0.47	▼0.56
Margin of victory		13,805	7.64	▼25.06
Turnout		1,80,620	70.14	▲11.82
Registered electors		2,57,498		▼15,881
DMK hold		Swing	▼11.74	

=== 2021 ===
2021 Tamil Nadu Legislative Assembly election: Palayamkottai
Party	Candidate	Votes	%	±%
DMK	M. Abdul Wahab	89,117	55.89%	+12.27
AIADMK	K. J. C. Jerald	36,976	23.19%	−10.17
SDPI	V. M. S. Mohamed Mubarak	12,241	7.68%	+3.15
MNM	D. Premnath	8,107	5.08%	New
NOTA	NOTA	1,647	1.03%	−0.87
Margin of victory		52,141	32.70%	22.44%
Turnout		1,59,444	58.32%	−2.68%
Rejected ballots		266	0.17%	
Registered electors		2,73,379		
DMK hold		Swing	12.27%	

=== 2016 ===
2016 Tamil Nadu Legislative Assembly election: Palayamkottai
Party	Candidate	Votes	%	±%
DMK	T. P. M. Mohideen Khan	67,463	43.62	+0.87
AIADMK	S. K. A. Hyder Ali	51,591	33.36	New
MDMK	K. M. A. Nizam Mohideen	12,593	8.14	New
BJP	M. Nirmal Singh Yadav	7,063	4.57	−0.54
SDPI	K. S. Shahul Hameed	7,008	4.53	New
NOTA	NOTA	2,947	1.91	New
PMK	S. Nishthar Ali	1,315	0.85	New
Margin of victory		15,872	10.26	9.82
Turnout		1,54,648	61.00	−7.62
Registered electors		2,53,520		
DMK hold		Swing	0.87	

=== 2011 ===
2011 Tamil Nadu Legislative Assembly election: Palayamkottai
Party	Candidate	Votes	%	±%
DMK	T. P. M. Mohideen Khan	58,049	42.76	−14.41
CPI(M)	V. Palani	57,444	42.31	New
Independent	K. S. Sahul Hameed	7,032	5.18	New
BJP	S. Karthick Narayanan	6,939	5.11	+3.2
Independent	A. Hyder Ali	2,624	1.93	New
Independent	S. Velayutham	1,000	0.74	New
BSP	P. Stephen	983	0.72	−0.86
Margin of victory		605	0.45	−27.29
Turnout		1,35,770	68.62	4.55
Registered electors		1,97,857		
DMK hold		Swing	-14.41	

=== 2006 ===
2006 Tamil Nadu Legislative Assembly election: Palayamkottai
Party	Candidate	Votes	%	±%
DMK	T. P. M. Mohideen Khan	85,114	57.16	+4.03
AIADMK	K. M. Nijamudeen	43,815	29.43	−9.69
DMDK	K. A. K. K. Kaleel Raguman	6,342	4.26	New
AIFB	V. Murugan	5,399	3.63	New
BJP	Pechimuthu @ Arunachalasamy	2,839	1.91%	New
BSP	M. Edward Raj	2,354	1.58	New
Independent	K. Subash Sundar	843	0.57	New
Margin of victory		41,299	27.74	13.73
Turnout		1,48,900	64.07	14.89
Registered electors		2,32,395		
DMK hold		Swing	4.03	

=== 2001 ===
2001 Tamil Nadu Legislative Assembly election: Palayamkottai
Party	Candidate	Votes	%	±%
DMK	T. P. M. Mohideen Khan	55,934	53.13%	−9.86
AIADMK	S. Muthu Karuppan	41,186	39.12%	+15.32
MDMK	Nazareth Durai	5,383	5.11%	+0.61
SP	Mubarak Ahamed	1,304	1.24%	New
Independent	T. Balamurugan	581	0.55%	New
Margin of victory		14,748	14.01%	−25.18%
Turnout		1,05,282	49.18%	−13.05%
Registered electors		2,14,114		
DMK hold		Swing	-9.86%	

=== 1996 ===
1996 Tamil Nadu Legislative Assembly election: Palayamkottai
Party	Candidate	Votes	%	±%
DMK	Mohamed Kodar Maideen	71,303	62.98%	New
AIADMK	P. Dharmalingam	26,939	23.80%	−22.31
MDMK	M. S. Sudarsan	5,093	4.50%	New
BJP	S. S. Velu	3,991	3.53%	New
Independent	K. M. A. Nijam Mohaideen	1,516	1.34%	New
PMK	M. Davood	1,066	0.94%	New
Margin of victory		44,364	39.19%	32.15%
Turnout		1,13,210	62.23%	3.01%
Registered electors		1,86,856		
DMK gain from AIADMK		Swing	16.88%	

=== 1991 ===
1991 Tamil Nadu Legislative Assembly election: Palayamkottai
Party	Candidate	Votes	%	±%
AIADMK	P. Dharamalingam	45,141	46.11%	+29.19
pattali makkal katchi	V. Karuppasamy Pandian	38,250	39.07%	New
IUML	L. K. S. Muhammed Meeran Mohideen	12,429	12.69%	−19.26
Margin of victory		6,891	7.04%	4.58%
Turnout		97,909	59.21%	−7.42%
Registered electors		1,69,762		
AIADMK gain from DMK		Swing	11.70%	

=== 1989 ===
1989 Tamil Nadu Legislative Assembly election: Palayamkottai
Party	Candidate	Votes	%	±%
DMK	S. Gurunathan	34,046	34.41%	−17.51
IUML	S. A. Khaja Mohideen	31,615	31.95%	New
AIADMK	Rajaselvam	16,738	16.92%	−30.18
AIADMK	A. Karuppiah	13,321	13.46%	−33.63
Independent	G. Gaspar Raja	802	0.81%	New
Margin of victory		2,431	2.46%	−2.37%
Turnout		98,943	66.64%	−4.02%
Registered electors		1,51,200		
DMK hold		Swing	-17.51%	

=== 1984 ===
1984 Tamil Nadu Legislative Assembly election: Palayamkottai
Party	Candidate	Votes	%	±%
DMK	V. S. T. Shamsulalam	45,209	51.92%	+9.88
AIADMK	V. Karuppasamy Pandian	41,004	47.09%	−10.86
Independent	J. Gaspar Raja	855	0.98%	New
Margin of victory		4,205	4.83%	−11.08%
Turnout		87,068	70.66%	3.35%
Registered electors		1,27,308		
DMK gain from AIADMK		Swing	-6.03%	

=== 1980 ===
1980 Tamil Nadu Legislative Assembly election: Palayamkottai
Party	Candidate	Votes	%	±%
AIADMK	V. Karuppasamy Pandian	45,049	57.96%	+13.85
DMK	Suba Seetharaman	32,680	42.04%	New
Margin of victory		12,369	15.91%	−5.20%
Turnout		77,729	67.31%	6.94%
Registered electors		1,16,635		
AIADMK hold		Swing	13.85%	

=== 1977 ===
1977 Tamil Nadu Legislative Assembly election: Palayamkottai
Party	Candidate	Votes	%	±%
AIADMK	Nanjil K. Manoharan	29,146	44.10%	New
Independent	N. Shanmugan	15,192	22.99%	New
INC	N. Arumugha Konar	14,202	21.49%	New
JP	S. Justin	6,973	10.55%	New
Independent	S. A. Seyad Ibrahim Alim	574	0.87%	New
Margin of victory		13,954	21.11%	
Turnout		66,087	60.36%	
Registered electors		1,10,603		
AIADMK win (new seat)				
