= Alangulam Assembly constituency =

One of the 234 State Legislative Assembly Constituencies in Tamil Nadu, in India

Coordinates: 8.8700°N 77.5000°E

Alangulam
- Constituency No. 223 for the Tamil Nadu Legislative Assembly

Constituency details
- Country: India
- Region: South India
- State: Tamil Nadu
- Lok Sabha constituency: Tirunelveli
- Established: 1951
- Total electors: 255,457

Member of Legislative Assembly
- 17th Tamil Nadu Legislative Assembly
- Incumbent P. H. Manoj Pandian
- Party: DMK
- Alliance: SPA
- Elected year: 2026

Alangulam is a state legislative assembly constituency in Tenkasi district in the Indian state of Tamil Nadu. It includes the city of Alangulam. It is a part of Tirunelveli Lok Sabha constituency. Most successful candidates: DMK & ADMK (5 times). It is one of the 234 State Legislative Assembly Constituencies in Tamil Nadu, in India.

== Members of the Legislative Assembly ==
Election	Member	Party
1952	Chinnathambi Thevar	Indian National Congress
1957	Veluchamy Thevar	Independent politician
1962	S. Chellapandian	Indian National Congress
1967	Aladi Aruna	Dravida Munnetra Kazhagam
1971	Aladi Aruna	Dravida Munnetra Kazhagam
1977	Karuppasamy Pandian	All India Anna Dravida Munnetra Kazhagam
1980	R. N. Krishna Pandian	Gandhi Kamaraj National Congress
1984	Shanmugiah Pandian	All India Anna Dravida Munnetra Kazhagam
1989	S. S. Ramasubbu	Indian National Congress
1991	S. S. Ramasubbu	Indian National Congress
1996	Aladi Aruna	Dravida Munnetra Kazhagam
2001	P. G. Rajendran	All India Anna Dravida Munnetra Kazhagam
2006	Poongothai Aladi Aruna	Dravida Munnetra Kazhagam
2011	P. G. Rajendran	All India Anna Dravida Munnetra Kazhagam
2016	Poongothai Aladi Aruna	Dravida Munnetra Kazhagam
2021	P. H. Manoj Pandian	All India Anna Dravida Munnetra Kazhagam
2026	P. H. Manoj Pandian	Dravida Munnetra Kazhagam

Madras State

== Election results ==
Vote share of winning candidates
2026	34.70%
2021	36.44%
2016	45.98%
2011	47.29%
2006	46.05%
2001	48.95%
1996	46.10%
1991	62.69%
1989	28.57%
1984	54.49%
1980	53.88%
1977	28.43%
1971	51.29%
1967	51.26%
1962	51.44%
1957	51.64%
1952	32.57%

=== 2026 ===
2026 Tamil Nadu Legislative Assembly election : Alangulam
Party	Candidate	Votes	%	±%
DMK	P. H. Manoj Pandian	69,170	31.32	▼3.69
AIADMK	K. R. P. Prabakaran	61,372	27.79	New
TVK	Vibin Chakkaravarthy	60,684	27.48	New
AIPTMMK	Madasamy	2,158	0.98	New
PT	A. Udhayakumar	1,620	0.73	▲0.18
NOTA	None of the above	982	0.44	▼0.45
Margin of victory		7,798	3.53	▲1.78
Turnout		221,103	86.46	▲8.40
Total valid votes		220,857		
Registered electors		255,730		▼1.90
DMK gain from AIADMK		Swing	▼5.45	

=== 2021 ===
2021 Tamil Nadu Legislative Assembly election : Alangulam
Party	Candidate	Votes	%	±%
AIADMK	P. H. Manoj Pandian	74,153	36.77	▼6.75
DMK	Dr. Poongothai Aladi Aruna	70,614	35.01	▼10.97
Independent	A. Hari Nadar	37,727	18.71	
DMDK	Rajendranathan	2,816	1.40	▼2.63
NOTA	None of the above	1,786	0.89	▼0.19
MNM	S. Selvakumar	1,454	0.72	New
Margin of victory		3,539	1.75	▼0.71
Turnout		203,484	78.06	▼1.05
Total valid votes		201,692		
Rejected ballots		6	0.00	▼0.08
Registered electors		260,688		▲6.58
AIADMK gain from DMK		Swing	▼9.21	

=== 2016 ===
2016 Tamil Nadu Legislative Assembly election : Alangulam
Party	Candidate	Votes	%	±%
DMK	Dr. Poongothai Aladi Aruna	88,891	45.98	▼1.13
AIADMK	Hepzi Karthikeyan	84,137	43.52	▼3.77
DMDK	Rajendranathan	7,784	4.03	New
BJP	S. V. Anburaj	4,660	2.41	▲0.80
NOTA	None of the above	2,089	1.08	New
Margin of victory		4,754	2.46	▲2.28
Turnout		193,488	79.11	▲79.11
Total valid votes		193,326		
Rejected ballots		162	0.08	
Registered electors		244,588		▲20.00
DMK gain from AIADMK		Swing	▼1.31	

=== 2011 ===
2011 Tamil Nadu Legislative Assembly election : Alangulam
Party	Candidate	Votes	%	±%
AIADMK	P. G. Rajendran	78,098	47.29	▲6.30
DMK	Dr. Poongothai Aladi Aruna	77,799	47.11	▲1.06
BJP	S. Sudalaiyandi	2,664	1.61	▲0.01
BSP	E. Murugesan	1,234	0.75	▼4.14
Independent	N. Rajendran	1,099	0.67	
Independent	S. Thanga Raja	1,058	0.64	
Margin of victory		299	0.18	▼4.88
Total valid votes		165,134		
Registered electors		203,826		▲11.17
AIADMK gain from DMK		Swing	▲1.24	

=== 2006 ===
2006 Tamil Nadu Legislative Assembly election : Alangulam
Party	Candidate	Votes	%	±%
DMK	Dr. Poongothai Aladi Aruna	62,299	46.05	▲0.54
AIADMK	M. Pandiaraj	55,454	40.99	New
BSP	M. Sivakumar	6,620	4.89	New
AIFB	P. Samynathan	4,664	3.45	New
DMDK	Muthu Kumarasamy @ K. Durai	2,751	2.03	New
BJP	M. Arulselvan	2,170	1.60	New
Independent	A. Meeran	1,336	0.99	
Margin of victory		6,845	5.06	▲1.62
Turnout		135,689	74.01	▲8.64
Total valid votes		135,294		
Registered electors		183,349		▲0.26
DMK gain from AIADMK		Swing	▼2.90	

=== 2001 ===
2001 Tamil Nadu Legislative Assembly election : Alangulam
Party	Candidate	Votes	%	±%
AIADMK	P. G. Rajendran	58,498	48.95	New
DMK	Aladi Aruna	54,387	45.51	▼0.59
MDMK	S. S. Krishnasamy	3,320	2.78	▼9.58
Independent	S. Vaikuntam	1,561	1.31	
Independent	P. Ravi Kumar	821	0.69	
Margin of victory		4,111	3.44	▼17.58
Turnout		119,555	65.37	▼7.55
Total valid votes		119,509		
Rejected ballots		46	0.04	▼5.33
Registered electors		182,877		▲9.05
AIADMK gain from DMK		Swing	▲2.85	

=== 1996 ===
1996 Tamil Nadu Legislative Assembly election : Alangulam
Party	Candidate	Votes	%	±%
DMK	Aladi Aruna	53,374	46.10	▲12.71
INC	M. S. Kamaraj	29,038	25.08	▼37.61
MDMK	M. P. Murugiah	14,309	12.36	New
AIIC(T)	S. S. Ramasubbu	6,475	5.59	New
BJP	S. V. Anburaj	3,236	2.80	New
Independent	I. Poolpandian	2,186	1.89	
Independent	S. Murugiah @ Murugiah Pandian	1,500	1.30	
Independent	S. Shunmugaih Pandian	864	0.75	
Margin of victory		24,336	21.02	▼8.29
Turnout		122,293	72.92	▲3.47
Total valid votes		115,771		
Rejected ballots		6,563	5.37	▲2.30
Registered electors		167,697		▲6.21
DMK gain from INC		Swing	▼16.59	

=== 1991 ===
1991 Tamil Nadu Legislative Assembly election : Alangulam
Party	Candidate	Votes	%	±%
INC	S. S. Ramasubbu	66,637	62.69	▲34.12
DMK	S. Gurunathan	35,487	33.39	▲5.26
PMK	C. Pavanasam	1,491	1.40	New
THMM	M. Sankar Palani	1,154	1.09	New
Margin of victory		31,150	29.31	▲28.87
Turnout		109,658	69.45	▼9.98
Total valid votes		106,288		
Rejected ballots		3,370	3.07	▲0.98
Registered electors		157,887		▲12.03
INC hold		Swing		

=== 1989 ===
1989 Tamil Nadu Legislative Assembly election : Alangulam
Party	Candidate	Votes	%	±%
INC	S. S. Ramasubbu	31,314	28.57	New
DMK	M. P. Murugiah	30,832	28.13	▼2.54
AIADMK	V. Karuppasamy Pandian	23,964	21.87	New
AIADMK	Aladi Aruna	20,867	19.04	New
Margin of victory		482	0.44	▼23.38
Turnout		111,933	79.43	▲3.67
Total valid votes		109,598		
Rejected ballots		2,335	2.09	▼4.61
Registered electors		140,927		▲12.82
INC gain from AIADMK		Swing	▼25.92	

=== 1984 ===
1984 Tamil Nadu Legislative Assembly election : Alangulam
Party	Candidate	Votes	%	±%
AIADMK	N. Shanmugiah Pandian	48,109	54.49	New
DMK	P. Thambi Thurai	27,076	30.67	▼14.48
Independent	T. Sekar	5,922	6.71	
Independent	S. P. Emarajan	3,866	4.38	
Independent	N. Thangaraj Pandian	2,448	2.77	
Independent	M. Rayappan	548	0.62	
Margin of victory		21,033	23.82	▲15.09
Turnout		94,631	75.76	▲8.47
Total valid votes		88,294		
Rejected ballots		6,337	6.70	▲5.24
Registered electors		124,914		▲8.13
AIADMK gain from GKC		Swing	▲0.61	

=== 1980 ===
1980 Tamil Nadu Legislative Assembly election : Alangulam
Party	Candidate	Votes	%	±%
GKC	R. Navaneetha Krishna Pandian	41,271	53.88	New
DMK	E. Dorai Singh	34,587	45.15	▲28.82
Independent	M. Rayappan Nadar	504	0.66	
Margin of victory		6,684	8.73	▲6.14
Turnout		77,737	67.29	▲4.40
Total valid votes		76,604		
Rejected ballots		1,133	1.46	▼0.05
Registered electors		115,519		▲0.80
GKC gain from AIADMK		Swing	▲25.45	

=== 1977 ===
1977 Tamil Nadu Legislative Assembly election : Alangulam
Party	Candidate	Votes	%	±%
AIADMK	V. Karuppasamy Pandian	20,183	28.43	New
JP	R. Navaneetha Krishna Pandian	18,342	25.84	New
INC	S. Ukkirama Pandian	17,997	25.35	New
DMK	P. Thambi Durai	11,592	16.33	▼34.96
Independent	S. Arulappan Nadar	1,024	1.44	
AIFB	T. Thirumaran	861	1.21	New
Independent	S. Subbiah Thevar	663	0.93	
Margin of victory		1,841	2.59	▲0.01
Turnout		72,074	62.89	▼15.40
Total valid votes		70,987		
Rejected ballots		1,087	1.51	▲1.51
Registered electors		114,602		▲22.61
AIADMK gain from DMK		Swing	▼22.86	

=== 1971 ===
1971 Tamil Nadu Legislative Assembly election : Alangulam
Party	Candidate	Votes	%	±%
DMK	Aladi Aruna	36,526	51.29	▲0.03
INC	S. K. T. Ramachandran	34,688	48.71	New
Margin of victory		1,838	2.58	▼1.35
Turnout		73,178	78.29	▲1.26
Total valid votes		71,214		
Registered electors		93,471		▲6.79
DMK hold		Swing		

=== 1967 ===
1967 Madras State Legislative Assembly election : Alangulam
Party	Candidate	Votes	%	±%
DMK	Aladi Aruna	33,509	51.26	▲38.05
INC	A. B. Balagan	30,938	47.32	▼4.12
Independent	M. Rayappan	930	1.42	
Margin of victory		2,571	3.93	▼12.16
Turnout		67,421	77.03	▲8.01
Total valid votes		65,377		
Registered electors		87,529		▼7.93
DMK gain from INC		Swing	▼0.18	

=== 1962 ===
1962 Madras State Legislative Assembly election : Alangulam
Party	Candidate	Votes	%	±%
INC	S. Chellapandian	32,650	51.44	▲10.67
SWA	N. H. M. Pandian	22,438	35.35	New
DMK	V. Arunachalam Nadar	8,387	13.21	New
Margin of victory		10,212	16.09	▲5.22
Turnout		65,619	69.02	▲29.32
Total valid votes		63,475		
Registered electors		95,066		▲0.17
INC gain from Independent		Swing	▼0.20	

=== 1957 ===
1957 Madras State Legislative Assembly election : Alangulam
Party	Candidate	Votes	%	±%
Independent	Veluchamy Thevar	19,458	51.64	
INC	S. Chellapandian	15,362	40.77	▲8.20
Independent	Ambalavana Pillai	2,858	7.59	
Margin of victory		4,096	10.87	▲1.98
Turnout		37,678	39.70	▼14.07
Total valid votes		37,678		
Registered electors		94,908		▲23.72
Independent gain from INC		Swing	▲19.07	

=== 1952 ===
1952 Madras State Legislative Assembly election : Alangulam
Party	Candidate	Votes	%	±%
INC	Chinnathambi Thevar	13,433	32.57	New
Independent	Thangarathnasami Nadar	9,765	23.68	New
Independent	Peter Arulmani	7,440	18.04	New
Socialist Party (India)	Velikandanatha Pillai	5,463	13.25	New
Independent	Maria Louis Pandian	5,144	12.47	New
Margin of victory		3,668	8.89	
Turnout		41,245	53.77	
Total valid votes		41,245		
Registered electors		76,713		
INC win (new seat)				
