= S. Gnanathiraviam =

Indian politician

Member of Parliament, Lok Sabha
- In office 30 May 2019 – 4 June 2024
- Preceded by: K. R. P. Prabakaran
- Succeeded by: C. Robert Bruce
- Constituency: Tirunelveli

Personal details
- Born: 15 July 1964 (age 61) Avaraikulam, Tirunelveli district, Tamil Nadu
- Party: Dravida Munnetra Kazhagam
- Spouse: Smt. Sutesha Hemalatha Date of Marriage = 31 Dec 1982
- Children: Sons: 2 - Xavier Selva Raja, Dinakaran, Daughters = 1 - Sujithra
- Parent(s): Father's Name:Shri Chelladurai Samiyadiyan, Mother's Name: Smt. Chellammal
- Website: www.gnanathiraviam.com

Samiyadiyan Gnanathiraviam is an Indian politician. He was elected to the Lok Sabha, lower house of the Parliament of India from Tirunelveli, Tamil Nadu in the 2019 Indian general election as member of the Dravida Munnetra Kazhagam.
