= Machendranathan =

Retired Civil Servant of Indian

Subrahmonian Machendranathan
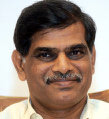
- Born: March 7, 1954 (age 72); India
- Citizenship: India
- Education: MBA, Cochin University
- Occupation: Chair man
- Employer(s): Airports Economic Regulatory Authority (AERA), New Delhi
- Organization: Government of India
- Parent(s): P.K. Subrahmonian, Mrs. S.Rathinam

S. Machendranathan IAS, is a retired Indian civil servant who hails from Tirunelveli district, Tamil Nadu. After completing an MBA from Cochin University, he joined the Indian Police Service (IPS) in 1977 and thereafter the Indian Administrative Service (IAS) in 1979.

An IAS officer of the Tamil Nadu cadre, Shri S. Machendranathan held several positions in the Government of Tamil Nadu and in the Central Government of India.

In the Government of Tamil Nadu, he worked as Collector of Thanjavur district; Commissioner/Secretary to the Government of Tamil Nadu in the Departments of Transport, Food, Cooperation and Consumer Protection; Chairman of Tamil Nadu Electricity Board.

In the Government of India, he worked as a leader of VOC Port Trust, Tuticorin; Additional Secretary & Financial Advisor in the Ministry of Steel as well as in the Ministry of Civil Aviation and finally as Secretary (Coordination) in Cabinet Secretariat, before superannuating from the Government Service in March, 2014.

He has also served as Government Director in several Public Sector companies such as Air India, Airports Authority of India, Steel Authority of India Limited, Rashtriya Ispat Nigam Limited, Kudremukh Iron Ore Company Limited and Metallurgical & Engineering Consultants (India) Limited.

== Executive Profile ==
Sl.No	Designation	Department/Office	From	To
1	Sub Collector	Chidhambaram	01/08/1981	01/06/1983
2	Under Secretary		01/06/1983	01/07/1984
3	Deputy Secretary	Food	01/07/1984	01/04/1988
4	Director		01/04/1988	01/06/1988
5	Collector	Thanjavur	01/06/1988	01/10/1989
6	Joint Chief Electoral Officer		01/10/1989	01/12/1989
7	Director		01/12/1989	01/02/1991
8	Joint Chief Electoral Officer		01/02/1991	01/07/1991
9	Director	Tamil Nadu Tourism Development Corporation	01/07/1991	01/09/1992
10	Joint Secretary	PWD	01/09/1992	01/09/1993
11	Managing Director	POOMPUHAR SHIPPING CORPORATION	01/09/1993	01/03/1995
12	Director	Raffles & Small Savings	01/03/1995	01/07/1995
13	Commissioner	Town Panchyats	01/07/1995	01/05/1996
14	Commissioner	Fisheries	01/06/1996	06/12/1996
15	Chairman	Tuticorin Port Trust	06/12/1996	05/12/2001
16	Commissioner	Disabled Welfare Deptt	01/01/2002	01/07/2002
17	Special Secretary	Co-operation, Food & Consumer Protection Deptt	16/07/2002	16/05/2006
18	Principal Secretary	Co-operation, Food & Consumer Protection Deptt	16/05/2006	05/11/2007
19	Chairman	TNEB	05/11/2007	26/11/2008
20	Principal Secretary	State Transport Authority of Tamil Nadu	26/11/2008	24/05/2010
21	Additional Secretary & Financial Advisor	Ministry of Steel, New Delhi	24/05/2010	13/07/2012
22	Additional Secretary & Financial Advisor	Ministry of Civil Aviation, New Delhi	13/07/2012	11/01/2013
23	Special Secretary & Financial Advisor	Ministry of Civil Aviation, New Delhi	11/07/2012	19/11/2013
24	Secretary (Coordination and Public Grievances)	Cabinet Secretariat, New Delhi	20/11/2013	31/03/2014
