= Chinnathambi Thevar =

Indian politician

Member of the Madras State Assembly
- In office 1952–1957
- Preceded by: Thangarathnasami Nadar
- Constituency: Alangulam

Personal details
- Party: Indian National Congress

Chinnathambi Thevar was an Indian politician and former Member of the Legislative Assembly. He was elected to the Tamil Nadu legislative assembly as an Indian National Congress candidate from Alangulam constituency in the 1952 election.

== Electoral performance ==
1952 Madras Legislative Assembly election: Alangulam
Party	Candidate	Votes	%	±%
INC	Chinnathambi Thevar	13,433	32.57%	New
Independent	Thangarathnasami Nadar	9,765	23.68%	New
Independent	Peter Arulmani	7,440	18.04%	New
Socialist Party (India)	Velikandanatha Pillai	5,463	13.25%	New
Independent	Maria Louis Pandian	5,144	12.47%	New
Margin of victory		3,668	8.89%	
Turnout		41,245	53.77%	
Registered electors		76,713		
INC win (new seat)				
