= S. S. Ramasubbu =

Indian politician

S. Sudalaimuthu Ramasubbu (born 11 February 1950 in Alangulam, Tirunelveli) is an Indian politician who served as a Member of Parliament for Tirunelvelifrom 2009 to 2014 and as Member of the Legislative Assembly. He was elected to the Tamil Nadu legislative assembly as an Indian National Congress candidate from Alangulam constituency in the 1989 and 1991 elections.

Ramasubbu's father S.Sudalaimuthu Nadar was active for the Indian National Congress party in Nellai District. Ramasubbu's political career started as the District Student Congress Secretary in 1972. After seven years working in a bank he became a full-time politician for the Congress party.

In 1989 the Congress party committee for Tamil Nadu decided to contest the Assembly election independently without an alliance with a Dravidian party. Ramasubbu was selected to contest the Alangulam Constituency, which he won against Aladi Aruna and Karuppasamy Pandian. Ramasubbu stood again in the Assembly Election of 1991 and was voted in with a larger majority of 32,000 votes.

In the 2009 General Election he was elected to the Lok Shabha by the Tirunelveli constituency voters. During that session of parliament he asked more than 1,000 questions and introduced the Fishermen (Welfare) Bill and the Special Educational Facilities Bill (For Children of Parents Living Below Poverty Line).

== Electoral performance ==
1991 Tamil Nadu Legislative Assembly election : Alangulam
Party	Candidate	Votes	%	±%
INC	S. S. Ramasubbu	66,637	62.69	▲34.12
DMK	S. Gurunathan	35,487	33.39	▲5.26
PMK	C. Pavanasam	1,491	1.40	New
THMM	M. Sankar Palani	1,154	1.09	New
Margin of victory		31,150	29.31	▲28.87
Turnout		109,658	69.45	▼9.98
Total valid votes		106,288		
Rejected ballots		3,370	3.07	▲0.98
Registered electors		157,887		▲12.03
INC hold		Swing		

1989 Tamil Nadu Legislative Assembly election : Alangulam
Party	Candidate	Votes	%	±%
INC	S. S. Ramasubbu	31,314	28.57	New
DMK	M. P. Murugiah	30,832	28.13	▼2.54
AIADMK	V. Karuppasamy Pandian	23,964	21.87	New
AIADMK	Aladi Aruna	20,867	19.04	New
Margin of victory		482	0.44	▼23.38
Turnout		111,933	79.43	▲3.67
Total valid votes		109,598		
Rejected ballots		2,335	2.09	▼4.61
Registered electors		140,927		▲12.82
INC gain from AIADMK		Swing	▼25.92	
