= Mohamed Kodar Maideen =

Indian politician

Mohamed Kodar Maideen was an Indian politician and former Member of the Legislative Assembly. He was elected to the Tamil Nadu legislative assembly as a Dravida Munnetra Kazhagam candidate from Palayamkottai constituency in 1996 election.
