= V. S. T. Shamsulalam =

Indian politician

V. S. T. Shamsulalam was an Indian politician and former Member of the Legislative Assembly. He was elected to the Tamil Nadu Legislative Assembly as a Dravida Munnetra Kazhagam candidate from Palayamkottai constituency in 1984 election.
