= Tirunelveli Lok Sabha constituency =

Parliamentary constituency in Tamil Nadu, India

Coordinates: 8.7°N 77.7°E

Tirunelveli
- Lok Sabha constituency
- Interactive map of Tirunelveli Loksabha constituency, post-2008 delimitation

Constituency details
- Country: India
- Region: South India
- State: Tamil Nadu
- Assembly constituencies: Alangulam; Tirunelveli; Ambasamudram; Palayamkottai; Nanguneri; Radhapuram
- Established: 1952
- Total electors: 16,20,514
- Reservation: None

Member of Parliament
- 18th Lok Sabha
- Incumbent Robert Bruce
- Party: INC
- Alliance: INDIA
- Elected year: 2024
- Preceded by: S. Gnanathiraviam

Tirunelveli Lok Sabha constituency is one of the 39 Lok Sabha (parliamentary) constituencies in Tamil Nadu, a state in South India. Its Parliamentary Constituency number is 38.

== Assembly segments ==
=== 2009–present ===
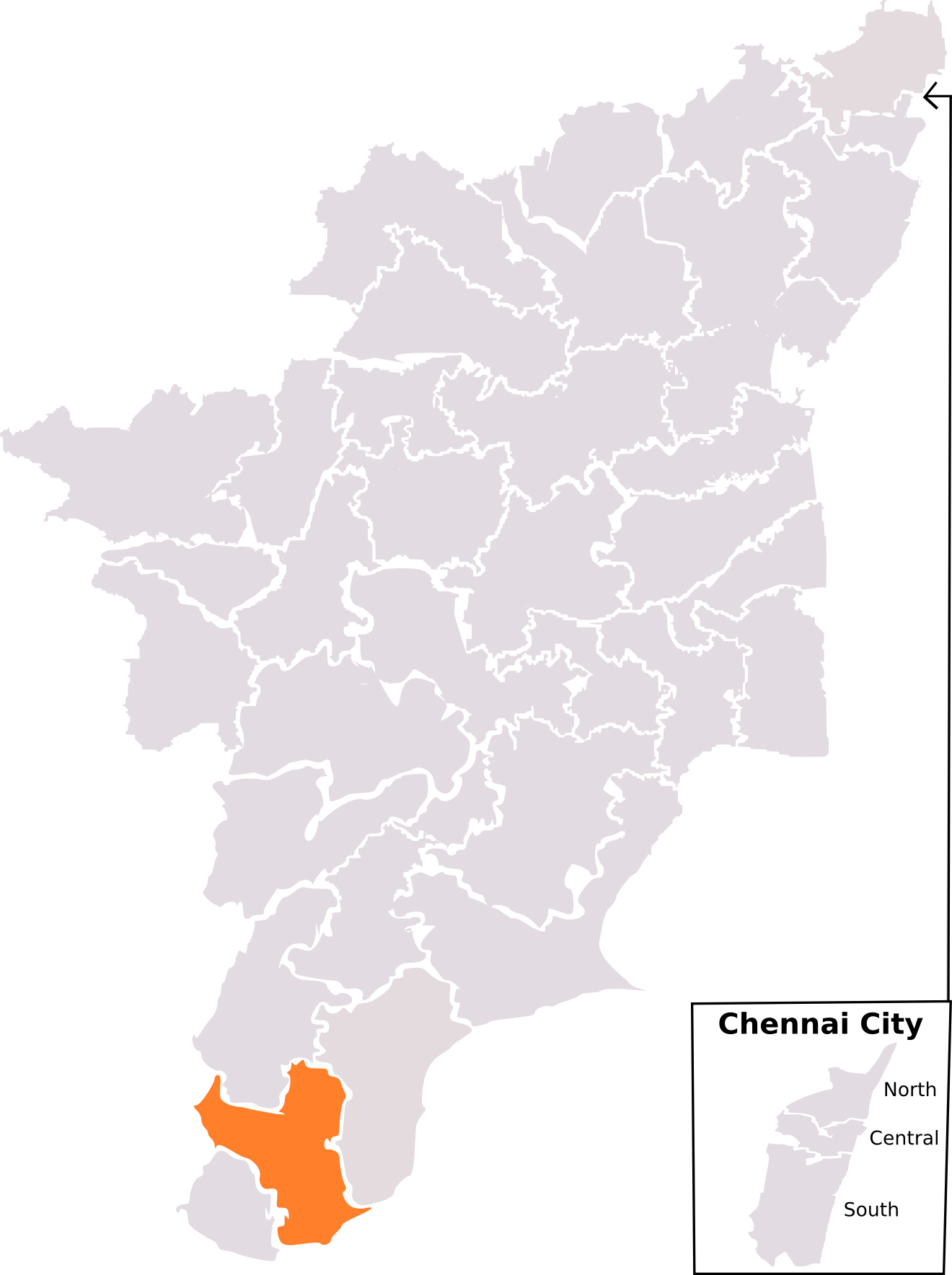
Tirunelveli constituency as laid out by 2008 Delimitation

Constituency number	Name	Reserved for (SC/ST/None)	District	Party	2024 Lead
223	Alangulam	None	Tenkasi	DMK	INC
224	Tirunelveli	None	Tirunelveli	TVK	INC
225	Ambasamudram	None	Tirunelveli	Vacant	INC
226	Palayamkottai	None	Tirunelveli	DMK	INC
227	Nanguneri	None	Tirunelveli	TVK	INC
228	Radhapuram	None	Tirunelveli	TVK	INC

=== Before 2009 ===
The constituency was composed of the following segments:

1. Vilathikulam (moved to Thoothukkudi Constituency)
2. Ottapidaram (moved to Thoothukkudi Constituency)
3. Tirunelveli
4. Palayamkottai
5. Tiruvaikuntam (moved to Thoothukkudi Constituency)
6. Thoothukudi (moved to Thoothukkudi Constituency)

== Members of Parliament ==
Year	Member	Party
1952	P. T. Thanu Pillai	Indian National Congress
1957	P. T. Thanu Pillai	Indian National Congress
1962	Muthiah	Indian National Congress
1967	S. Xavier	Swatantra Party
1971	S. A. Muruganantham	Communist Party of India
1977	Aladi Aruna	All India Anna Dravida Munnetra Kazhagam
1980	D. S. A. Sivaprakasam	Dravida Munnetra Kazhagam
1984	Kadambur R. Janarthanan	All India Anna Dravida Munnetra Kazhagam
1989	Kadambur R. Janarthanan	All India Anna Dravida Munnetra Kazhagam
1991	Kadambur R. Janarthanan	All India Anna Dravida Munnetra Kazhagam
1996	D. S. A. Sivaprakasam	Dravida Munnetra Kazhagam
1998	Kadambur R. Janarthanan	All India Anna Dravida Munnetra Kazhagam
1999	P. H. Pandian	All India Anna Dravida Munnetra Kazhagam
2004	R. Dhanuskodi Athithan	Indian National Congress
2009	S. S. Ramasubbu	Indian National Congress
2014	K. R. P. Prabakaran	All India Anna Dravida Munnetra Kazhagam
2019	S. Gnanathiraviam	Dravida Munnetra Kazhagam
2024	Robert Bruce	Indian National Congress

== Election results ==
Vote share of Winning candidates
2024	47.06%
2019	50.65%
2014	41.93%
2009	39.29%
2004	58.40%
1999	41.62%
1998	41.44%
1996	45.53%
1991	62.09%
1989	65.01%
1984	57.64%
1980	54.89%
1977	69.82%
1971	56.26%
1967	48.12%
1962	47.69%
1957	50.75%
1951	44.32%

=== General Elections 2024 ===
2024 Indian general election: Tirunelveli
Party	Candidate	Votes	%	±%
INC	Robert Bruce	502,296	47.06	▼3.59
BJP	Nainar Nagendran	336,676	31.54	New
AIADMK	M. Jansi Rani	89,601	8.39	▼24.27
Independent	Pottal Sundara Muniswaran	19,852	1.86	New
NOTA	None of the above	7,396	0.69	▼0.37
Margin of victory		165,620	15.52	▼2.47
Turnout		1,067,448	65.00	▼2.22
INDIA hold		Swing	▼3.59	

=== General Elections 2019 ===
2019 Indian general election: Tirunelveli
Party	Candidate	Votes	%	±%
DMK (UPA)	S. Gnanathiraviam	522,993	50.65	22.00
AIADMK (NDA)	P. H. Manoj Pandian	337,273	32.66	−9.27
Independent	S. Michael Rayappan	62,235	6.03	
MNM	M. Vennimalai	23,120	2.24	
NOTA	None of the above	10,968	1.06	−0.30
Margin of victory		185,720	17.99	4.71
Turnout		1,032,530	67.22	−0.13
Registered electors		1,547,800		8.97
DMK gain from AIADMK		Swing	8.72	

=== General Elections 2014 ===
2014 Indian general election: Tirunelveli
Party	Candidate	Votes	%	±%
AIADMK	K. R. P. Prabakaran	398,139	41.93	5.69
DMK	Devadasa Sundaram	2,72,040	28.65	
DMDK	S. Sivan Anenthaperumal	1,27,370	13.42	−0.10
INC	S. S. Ramasubbu	62,863	6.62	−32.66
TNMK	T. Dhevanathan Yadav	19,381	2.04	
AAP	M. P. Sesuraj	18,353	1.93	
SDPI	V. M. S. Mohamed Mubarak	14,877	1.57	
NOTA	None of the above	12,893	1.36	
BSP	T. Thevendran	4,692	0.49	
Margin of victory		1,26,099	13.28	10.24
Turnout		9,49,437	67.77	0.80
Registered electors		14,20,435		34.04
AIADMK gain from INC		Swing	2.65	

=== General Elections 2009 ===
2009 Indian general election: Tirunelveli
Party	Candidate	Votes	%	±%
INC	S. S. Ramasubbu	274,932	39.29	−19.11
AIADMK	K. Annamalai	2,53,629	36.24	4.20
DMDK	S. Michael Rayappan	94,562	13.51	
BJP	Karu. Nagarajan	39,997	5.72	
Independent	N. Jeyabalan	6,079	0.87	
Margin of victory		21,303	3.04	−23.32
Turnout		6,99,830	66.13	7.70
Registered electors		10,59,687		−2.45
INC hold		Swing	-19.11	

=== General Elections 2004 ===
2004 Indian general election: Tirunelveli
Party	Candidate	Votes	%	±%
INC	R. Dhanuskodi Athithan	370,127	58.40	
AIADMK	R. Amirtha Ganesan	2,03,052	32.04	−9.59
JD(U)	M. Appavu	39,333	6.21	
Independent	C. Sridhar Babu	5,774	0.91	
BSP	T. Kasipandian	3,606	0.57	
Margin of victory		1,67,075	26.36	21.95
Turnout		6,33,782	58.35	3.88
Registered electors		10,86,290		−3.17
INC gain from AIADMK		Swing	16.78	

=== General Elections 1999 ===
1999 Indian general election: Tirunelveli
Party	Candidate	Votes	%	±%
AIADMK	P. H. Pandian	249,975	41.62	0.18
DMK	P. Geetha Jeevan	2,23,481	37.21	−3.07
PT	P. V. Bakthavatchalam	1,12,941	18.81	
AIFB	M. Sethu Rama Pandian	3,913	0.65	
Independent	S. Sundararaj	2,534	0.42	
Independent	T. Suyambulingam	2,463	0.41	
Margin of victory		26,494	4.41	3.26
Turnout		6,00,554	54.46	−10.96
Registered electors		11,21,877		4.32
AIADMK hold		Swing	-3.90	

=== General Elections 1998 ===
1998 Indian general election: Tirunelveli
Party	Candidate	Votes	%	±%
AIADMK	Kadambur R. Janarthanan	247,823	41.44	14.17
DMK	R. Sarathkumar	2,40,919	40.29	−5.24
PT	Dr. A. Savior Selva Suresh	86,419	14.45	
MADMK	G. R. Edmund	16,789	2.81	
Independent	Krishna Kanthan Yadhav	3,795	0.63	
Margin of victory		6,904	1.15	−17.10
Turnout		5,98,014	56.68	−8.74
Registered electors		10,75,467		5.04
AIADMK gain from DMK		Swing	-4.08	

=== General Elections 1996 ===
1996 Indian general election: Tirunelveli
Party	Candidate	Votes	%	±%
DMK	D. S. A. Sivaprakasam	295,001	45.53	10.60
AIADMK	A. R. Rajaselvam	1,76,721	27.27	−34.81
MDMK	Kutty Alias Shunmuga Chidambaram	77,648	11.98	
JP	K. Krishnasamy	61,567	9.50	
BJP	A. R. Ponniah	25,545	3.94	
Margin of victory		1,18,280	18.25	−8.91
Turnout		6,47,991	65.42	5.79
Registered electors		10,23,826		5.57
DMK gain from AIADMK		Swing	-16.56	

=== General Elections 1991 ===
1991 Indian general election: Tirunelveli
Party	Candidate	Votes	%	±%
AIADMK	Kadambur R. Janarthanan	351,048	62.09	−2.92
DMK	K. P. Kandasamy	1,97,456	34.92	1.41
PMK	S. Krishnakanthan Yadav	10,055	1.78	
JP	M. P. Jebaraj	2,619	0.46	
Margin of victory		1,53,592	27.16	−4.34
Turnout		5,65,423	59.63	−3.74
Registered electors		9,69,816		−0.07
AIADMK hold		Swing	-2.92	

=== General Elections 1989 ===
1989 Indian general election: Tirunelveli
Party	Candidate	Votes	%	±%
AIADMK	Kadambur R. Janarthanan	394,444	65.01	7.37
DMK	D. S. A. Sivaprakasam	2,03,309	33.51	−7.45
Margin of victory		1,91,135	31.50	14.81
Turnout		6,06,767	63.37	−7.15
Registered electors		9,70,473		28.04
AIADMK hold		Swing	7.37	

=== General Elections 1984 ===
1984 Indian general election: Tirunelveli
Party	Candidate	Votes	%	±%
AIADMK	Kadambur R. Janarthanan	296,897	57.64	15.58
DMK	D. S. A. Sivaprakasam	2,10,951	40.95	−13.94
Independent	P. Devapiran	4,702	0.91	
Independent	J. Kulandai	2,541	0.49	
Margin of victory		85,946	16.69	3.86
Turnout		5,15,091	70.52	2.82
Registered electors		7,57,930		7.87
AIADMK gain from DMK		Swing	2.75	

=== General Elections 1980 ===
1980 Indian general election: Tirunelveli
Party	Candidate	Votes	%	±%
DMK	D. S. A. Sivaprakasam	256,626	54.89	26.95
AIADMK	Aladi Aruna	1,96,664	42.06	−27.75
Independent	S. Murugesan	7,614	1.63	
Margin of victory		59,962	12.83	−29.06
Turnout		4,67,531	67.70	1.65
Registered electors		7,02,603		4.45
DMK gain from AIADMK		Swing	-14.93	

=== General Elections 1977 ===
1977 Indian general election: Tirunelveli
Party	Candidate	Votes	%	±%
AIADMK	Aladi Aruna	304,562	69.82	
DMK	K. M. Samsuddin Alias Kathiravan	1,21,869	27.94	
Independent	K. P. Ganapathy	4,414	1.01	
Independent	P. T. Thanu Pillai	2,485	0.57	
Margin of victory		1,82,693	41.88	26.14
Turnout		4,36,223	66.04	−2.45
Registered electors		6,72,649		15.09
AIADMK gain from CPI		Swing	13.56	

=== General Elections 1971 ===
1971 Indian general election: Tirunelveli
Party	Candidate	Votes	%	±%
CPI	S. A. Muruganantham	214,214	56.26	41.68
SWA	S. Palaniswaminathan	1,54,277	40.52	
Independent	H. Somasundaram	12,287	3.23	
Margin of victory		59,937	15.74	4.93
Turnout		3,80,778	68.50	−5.24
Registered electors		5,84,445		7.45
CPI gain from SWA		Swing	8.14	

=== General Elections 1967 ===
1967 Indian general election: Tirunelveli
Party	Candidate	Votes	%	±%
SWA	S. Xavier	186,864	48.12	
INC	A. P. C. Veerabahu	1,44,873	37.31	−10.38
CPI	S. A. Muruganantham	56,588	14.57	
Margin of victory		41,991	10.81	3.90
Turnout		3,88,325	73.73	4.21
Registered electors		5,43,945		15.51
SWA gain from INC		Swing	0.43	

=== General Elections 1962 ===
1962 Indian general election: Tirunelveli
Party	Candidate	Votes	%	±%
INC	Muthiah	151,822	47.69	−3.06
SWA	Mariadas Ruthnasamy	1,29,803	40.77	
PSP	Mangala Ponnambalam	30,674	9.63	
Independent	S. Rajagopalachari	6,072	1.91	
Margin of victory		22,019	6.92	−17.77
Turnout		3,18,371	69.52	22.76
Registered electors		4,70,895		5.62
INC hold		Swing	-3.06	

=== General Elections 1957 ===
1957 Indian general election: Tirunelveli
Party	Candidate	Votes	%	±%
INC	P. T. Thanu Pillai	105,793	50.75	6.42
Independent	Sankaranarayana Moopanar	54,319	26.06	
PSP	Ramanujam	30,603	14.68	
Independent	Sivasankaran Chettiar	17,761	8.52	
Independent	Kannappa Pillai	0	0.00	
Independent	Meganathan	0	0.00	
Margin of victory		51,474	24.69	17.38
Turnout		2,08,476	46.76	−8.37
Registered electors		4,45,857		26.56
INC hold		Swing	6.42	

=== General Elections 1951 ===
1951–52 Indian general election: Tirunelveli
Party	Candidate	Votes	%	±%
INC	P. T. Thanu Pillai	86,077	44.32	44.32
Independent	Athimoolam	71,871	37.01	
SP	Ramaswami	36,255	18.67	
Margin of victory		14,206	7.32	
Turnout		1,94,203	55.13	
Registered electors		3,52,281		0.00
INC win (new seat)				

== See also ==
- Tirunelveli
- List of constituencies of the Lok Sabha
