= D. S. A. Sivaprakasam =

Indian politician

D. S. A. Sivaprakasam was an Indian politician and former Member of the Legislative Assembly and Member of Parliament. He was elected to the Tamil Nadu legislative assembly as a Swatantra Party candidate from Cheranmadevi constituency in 1971 election.

He was elected from Tirunelveli Lok Sabha constituency to 7th Lok Sabha as a Dravida Munnetra Kazhagam in 1980 election. He was again elected to the 11th Lok Sabha in 1996 election as a Dravida Munnetra Kazhagam candidate.

Sivaprakasam is an agriculturist, exporter and social worker.

== Positions held ==
1971-76 Member, Tamil Nadu Legislative Assembly Member, Swatantra Party
1980 Elected to Lok Sabha (Seventh)
1980 onwards Member, General Council, D.M.K., Tamil Nadu
1980-84 Member, Consultative Committee, Ministry of Commerce
1981-91 Treasurer, D.M.K., District. Tirunelveli
1996 Re-elected to Lok Sabha (Eleventh)
