= S. Chellapandian =

Indian politician

Speaker, Madras Legislative Assembly
- In office 31 March 1962 – 14 March 1967
- Preceded by: U. Krishna Rao
- Succeeded by: S. P. Adithanar

Personal details
- Born: 25 August 1913

S. Chellapandian was an Indian politician of the Indian National Congress and member of the legislative assembly of Madras state from Tirunelveli. He served as the Speaker of the Madras Legislative Assembly from 1962 to 1967.

== Electoral performance ==
1967 Madras Legislative Assembly election: Cheranmadevi
Party	Candidate	Votes	%	±%
SWA	D. S. Adhimoolam	36,206	53.78	New
INC	S. Chellapandian	29,831	44.31	New
Independent	N. Hariharan	840	1.25	New
Independent	P. Annamalai	445	0.66	New
Margin of victory		6,375	9.47	
Turnout		67,322	80.62	
Registered electors		85,484		
SWA win (new seat)				

1962 Madras State Legislative Assembly election : Alangulam
Party	Candidate	Votes	%	±%
INC	S. Chellapandian	32,650	51.44	▲10.67
SWA	N. H. M. Pandian	22,438	35.35	New
DMK	V. Arunachalam Nadar	8,387	13.21	New
Margin of victory		10,212	16.09	▲5.22
Turnout		65,619	69.02	▲29.32
Total valid votes		63,475		
Registered electors		95,066		▲0.17
INC gain from Independent		Swing	▼0.20	

1957 Madras State Legislative Assembly election : Alangulam
Party	Candidate	Votes	%	±%
Independent	Veluchamy Thevar	19,458	51.64	
INC	S. Chellapandian	15,362	40.77	▲8.20
Independent	Ambalavana Pillai	2,858	7.59	
Margin of victory		4,096	10.87	▲1.98
Turnout		37,678	39.70	▼14.07
Total valid votes		37,678		
Registered electors		94,908		▲23.72
Independent gain from INC		Swing	▲19.07	
