= 1998 Indian general election in Tamil Nadu =

Parliamentary election in India

Indian general election in Tamil Nadu, 1998
- 16, 22 and 28 February 1998

39 (of 543) seats in the Lok Sabha
- Registered: 4,55,77,788
- Turnout: 2,64,10,702 (57.95%) ▼8.98%
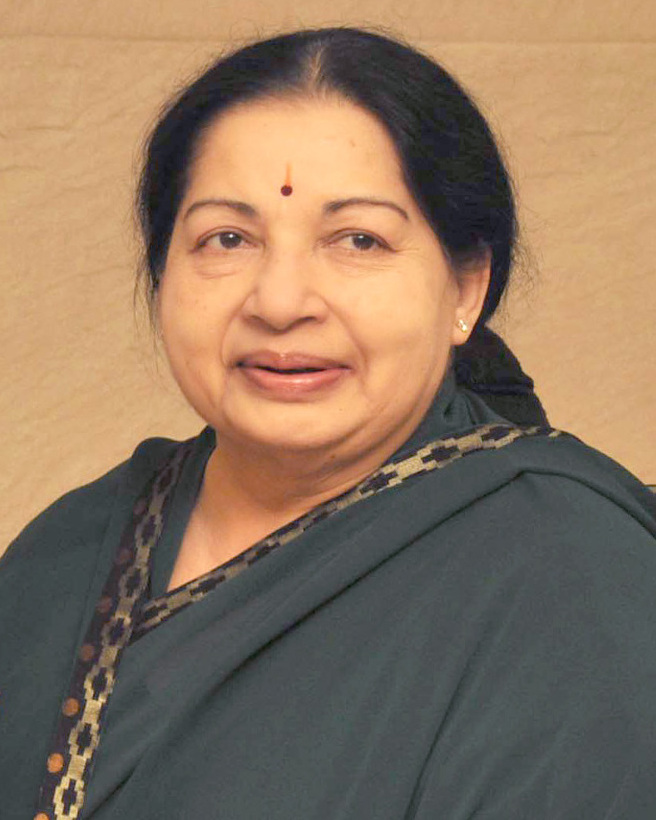

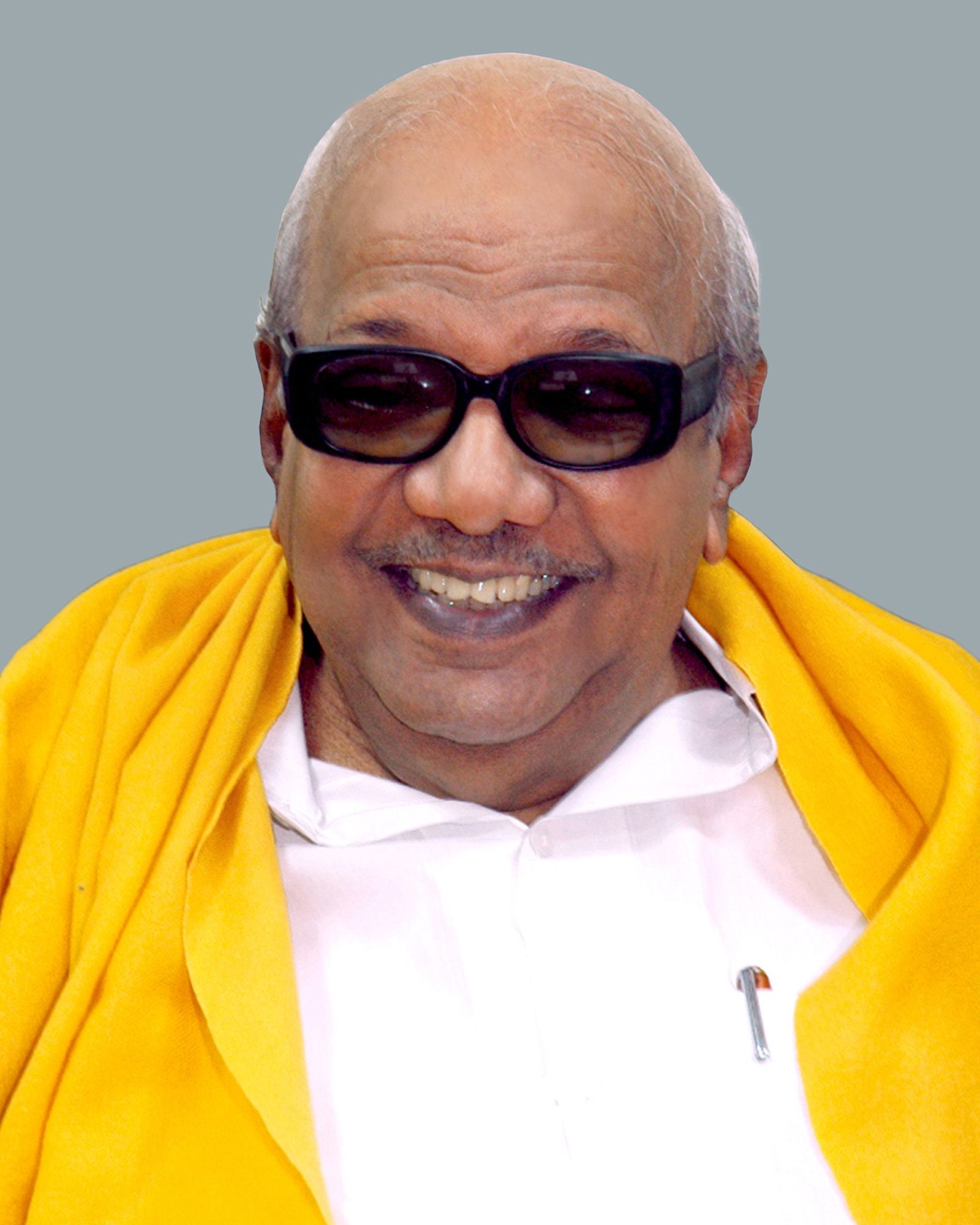
	First party	Second party
Leader	J. Jayalalithaa	M. Karunanidhi
Party	AIADMK	DMK
Alliance	NDA	UF+LF
Seats won	30	9
Seat change	▲30	▼30
Popular vote	1,21,69,812	1,09,37,809
Percentage	47.53%	42.72%
Swing	▲29.47%	▼12.24%
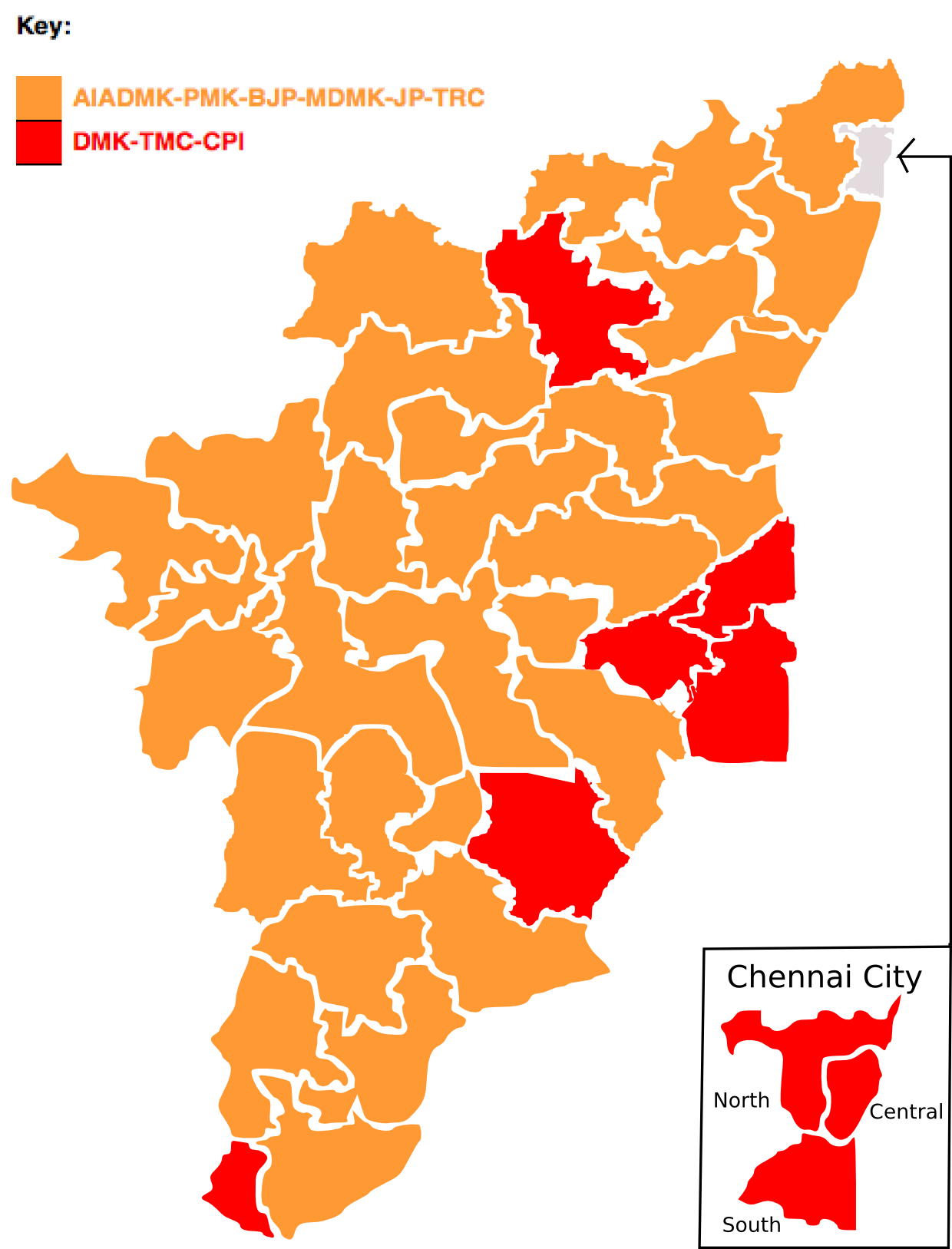
- 1998 Election map (by constituencies); Saffron = NDA and Red = UF

Prime Minister before election
Inder Kumar Gujral
JD
Prime Minister after election
Atal Bihari Vajpayee
BJP

The 1998 Indian general election polls in Tamil Nadu were held for 39 seats in the state. New elections were called when Indian National Congress (INC) left the United Front government led by I. K. Gujral, after they refused to drop the regional Dravida Munnetra Kazhagam (DMK) party from the government after the DMK was linked by an investigative panel to Sri Lankan separatists blamed for the killing of Rajiv Gandhi. The result was a landslide victory for the National Democratic Alliance (NDA) winning 30 seats, which helped result in Atal Bihari Vajpayee being sworn in as the 16th Prime Minister of India. J. Jayalalithaa and the All India Anna Dravida Munnetra Kazhagam, broke off from their long alliance with Indian National Congress and formed an alliance with Bharatiya Janata Party, by joining the National Democratic Alliance. This state proved to be very important in determining the prime minister, since the 18 seats of AIADMK proved valuable for BJP to hold power. That was short-lived, since the AIADMK left the alliance in less than a year, and BJP lost the vote of confidence resulting in fresh elections being called.

== Election schedule ==
Poll event	Phase		
Poll event	I	II	III
Notification date	20 January 1998	21 January 1998	28 January 1998
Last date for filing nomination	27 January 1998	28 January 1998	4 February 1998
Scrutiny of nomination	28 January 1998	29 January 1998	5 February 1998
Last Date for withdrawal of nomination	30 January 1998	31 January 1998	7 February 1998
Date of poll	16 February 1998	22 February 1998	28 February 1998
Date of counting of votes/Result	7 March 1998		
No. of constituencies	14	24	1

Voting Phases
I (14 seats)	II (24 seats)	III (1 seat)
Chennai North; Chennai Central; Chennai South; Sriperumbudur; Chengalpattu; Arakkonam; Vellore; Tiruppattur; Vandavasi; Dharmapuri; Krishnagiri; Salem; Tiruchengode; Gobichettipalayam	Tindivanam; Cuddalore; Chidambaram; Rasipuram; Nilgiris; Pollachi; Palani; Dindigul; Periyakulam; Madurai; Karur; Tiruchirappalli; Perambalur; Mayiladuthurai; Nagapattinam; Thanjavur; Pudukkottai; Sivaganga; Ramanathapuram; Sivakasi; Tirunelveli; Tenkasi; Tiruchendur; Nagercoil	Coimbatore

== Seat allotments ==
Source: Frontline

=== National Democratic Alliance ===
Source: Indian Express

National Democratic Alliance
Party	Flag	Symbol	Leader	Seats
All India Anna Dravida Munnetra Kazhagam			J. Jayalalithaa	22
Pattali Makkal Katchi (Note: Since, Pattali Makkal Katchi had not been recognised as a state party until the election and it's elephant symbol was replaced by an Independent Symbol Mango, And Same symbol contested by MGR ADMK, but both of them did not contest against each other, then after 1998, Mango Symbol was given to PMK after its State Recognition)			Dr. Ramdoss	5
Bharatiya Janata Party			K. N. Lakshmanan	5
Marumalarchi Dravida Munnetra Kazhagam			Vaiko	5
Janata Party			Subramanian Swamy	1
Tamizhaga Rajiv Congress (Note: Tamizhaga Rajiv Congress candidate Vazhappady K. Ramamurthy ran as an independent.)			Vazhappady K. Ramamurthy	1
Total				39

=== United Front ===
DMK-led Alliance (Note: Even though CPI(M) originally wanted to contest in support of the United Front, it decided to contest alone when only 1 seat (Coimbatore) was offered. After the fallout, CPI(M) wanted to contest 6 seats in Tamil Nadu on its own, but eventually only contested 2 seats and decided to support DMK-TMC front in the other 37 seats. This was done to keep out the possibility of any vote splitting that might result in NDA gaining seats.)
Party	Flag	Symbol	Leader	Seats
Tamil Maanila Congress			G. K. Moopanar	20
Dravida Munnetra Kazhagam			M. Karunanidhi	17
Communist Party of India			R. Nallakannu	2
Total				39

=== Congress alliance ===
INC-led Alliance
Party	Flag	Symbol	Leader	Seats
Indian National Congress			Tindivanam K. Ramamurthy	35
MGR Anna Dravida Munnetra Kazhagam			Su. Thirunavukkarasar	3
United Communist Party of India			D. Pandian	1
Total				39

== List of Candidates ==
Constituency		NDA		United Front		INC+	
#	Name	Party	Candidate	Party	Candidate	Party	Candidate
1	Chennai North	MDMK	R. T. Sabapathy Mohan	DMK	C. Kuppusami	INC	G. K. J. Bharathi
2	Chennai Central	ADMK	D. Jayakumar	DMK	Murasoli Maran	INC	Era. Anbarasu
3	Chennai South	BJP	Jana Krishnamoorthy	DMK	T. R. Baalu	INC	M. P. Subramaniam
4	Sriperumbudur	ADMK	K. Venugopal	DMK	T. Nagaratnam	INC	K. Jeyakumar
5	Chengalpattu	ADMK	K. Panneerselvam	DMK	K. Parasuraman	INC	T. N. Muruganandam
6	Arakkonam	ADMK	C. Gopal	TMC	A. M. Velu	INC	R. Dhamotharan
7	Vellore	PMK	N. T. Shanmugam	DMK	T. A. Md. Saqhe	INC	B. Akber Pasha
8	Tiruppattur	ADMK	S. Krishnamoorthy	DMK	D. Venugopal	INC	R. Kannabiran
9	Vandavasi	PMK	M. Durai	TMC	L. Balaraman	INC	M. Krishnasamy
10	Tindivanam	MDMK	N. Ramachandran	DMK	G. Venkatraman	INC	K. Ramamurthy
11	Cuddalore	ADMK	M. C. Dhamodaran	TMC	P. R. S. Venkatesan	INC	Dr. R Eramadass
12	Chidambaram	PMK	R. Ezhilmalai	DMK	V. Ganesan	INC	P. Vallalperuman
13	Dharmapuri	PMK	K. Pary Mohan	TMC	P. Theertharaman	UCPI	P. K. Pattabiraman
14	Krishnagiri	ADMK	K. P. Munusamy	TMC	D. R. Rajaram	INC	Aga. Krishnamurthy
15	Rasipuram	ADMK	V. Saroja	TMC	K. Kandasamy	INC	K. Thenmozhi
16	Salem	TRC	K. Ramamurthy	TMC	R. Devadass	INC	K. V. Thangkabalu
17	Tiruchengode	ADMK	K. Palanisamy	DMK	K. P. Ramalingam	INC	P. Palanisamy
18	Nilgiris	BJP	M. Master Mathan	TMC	Balasubramaniam	INC	R. Prabhu
19	Gobichettipalayam	ADMK	V. K. Chinnasamy	DMK	N. Ramasamy	INC	E. V. K. S. Elangovan
20	Coimbatore	BJP	C. P. Radhakrishnan	DMK	K. R. Subbian	INC	R. Krishnan
21	Pollachi	ADMK	M. Thiyagarajan	TMC	Kovai Thangam	INC	R. Eswaravelu
22	Palani	MDMK	A. Ganeshamurthi	TMC	S. K. Kharvendhan	INC	K. S. Venugopal
23	Dindigul	ADMK	C. Sreenivasan	TMC	N. S. V. Chitthan	MADMK	S. Latha
24	Madurai	JP	Subramaniyam Swamy	TMC	A. G. S. Ram Babu	INC	D. Pandian
25	Periyakulam	ADMK	Sedapatti Muthaih	DMK	R. Gandhimathi	INC	M. Veeraprakash
26	Karur	ADMK	M. Thambidurai	DMK	K. Natrayan	INC	Shanmugasundaram
27	Tiruchirappalli	BJP	R. Kumaramangalam	TMC	L. Adaikalaraj	INC	Subbha Somu
28	Perambalur	ADMK	P. Rajarathinam	DMK	A. Raja	INC	P. V. Subramanian
29	Mayiladuthurai	PMK	P. D. Arul Mozhi	TMC	K. Krishnamoorthy	INC	R. Thirunavukkarasu
30	Nagapattinam	ADMK	Dr. K. Gopal	CPI	M. Selvarasu	INC	M. Thiagarajan
31	Thanjavur	MDMK	L. Ganesan	DMK	S. S. Palanimanickam	INC	Mathiyalagan
32	Pudukkottai	ADMK	Raja Paramasivam	DMK	P. N. Siva	MADMK	Su. Thirunavukkarasar
33	Sivaganga	ADMK	K. Kalimuthu	TMC	P. Chidambaram	INC	M. Gowrishankaran
34	Ramanathapuram	ADMK	V. Sathyamoorthy	TMC	S. P. Udaiyappan	INC	V. Rajeshwaren
35	Sivakasi	MDMK	Vaiko	CPI	V. Alagirisamy	INC	K. Rajendran
36	Tirunelveli	ADMK	M. R. Janardhanan	DMK	R. Sarath Kumar	MADMK	G. R. Edmund
37	Tenkasi	ADMK	S. Murugesan	TMC	M. Arunachalam	INC	V. Selvaraj
38	Tiruchendur	ADMK	Ramarajan	TMC	Dhanushkodi	INC	Kumari Ananthan
39	Nagercoil	BJP	Pon Radhakrishnan	TMC	N. Dennis	INC	P. S. Stanislaus

== Opinion poll ==
Polling agency	Date published					Lead	Ref.
Polling agency	Date published	DMK+	NDA	INC	Others	Lead	Ref.
Frontline-Apt Research Group	February 1998	33	6	0	0	27	DMK

== Voting and results ==
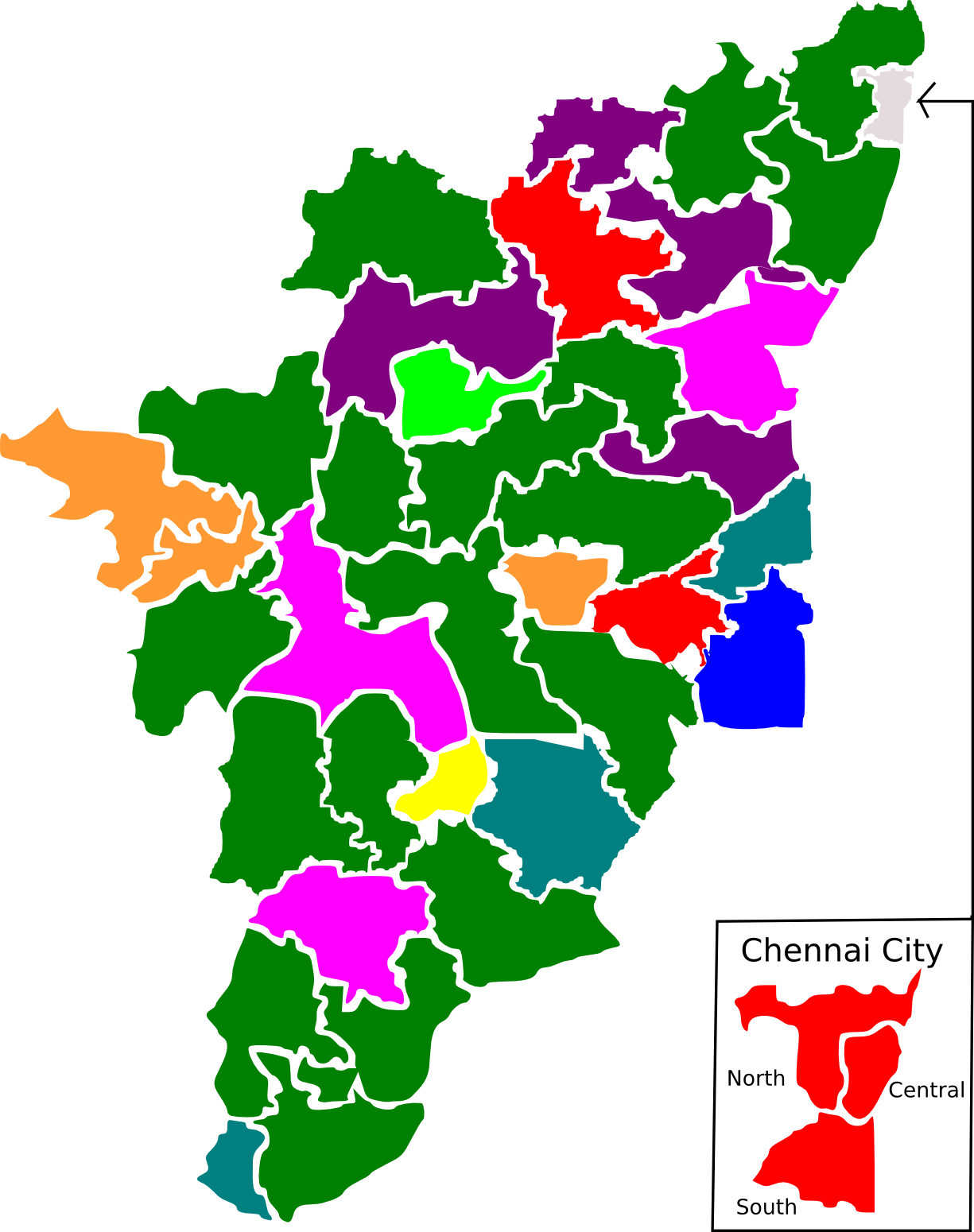
Election map of results based on parties. Colours are based on the results table on the left

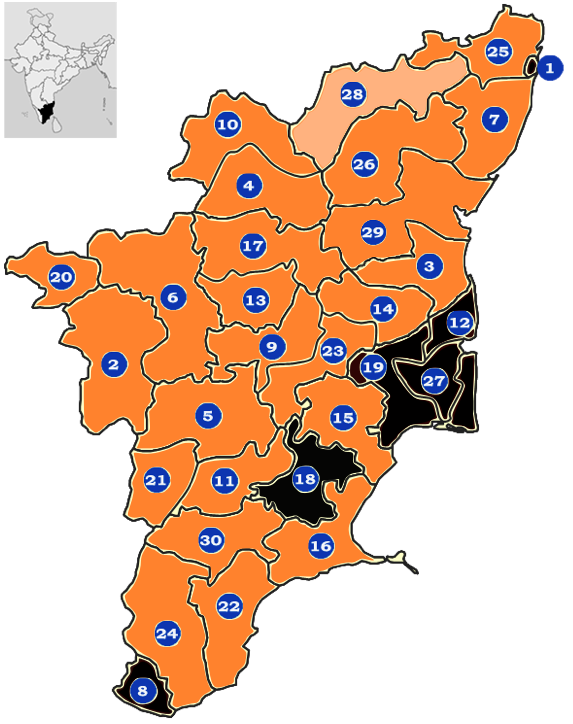
Election Map (Results reflected as %seats won by districts) AIADMK-BJP alliance won all the seats in this district AIADMK-BJP alliance won 67% of the seats (Vellore) DMK-TMC-CPI alliance won all the seats in this district

Alliance	Party	Popular Vote	Percentage	Swing	Seats won	Seat Change
National Democratic Alliance	All India Anna Dravida Munnetra Kazhagam	6,628,928	25.89%	▲18.05%	18	▲18
National Democratic Alliance	Pattali Makkal Katchi	1,548,976	6.05%	▲4.02%	4	▲4
National Democratic Alliance	Bharatiya Janata Party	1,757,645	6.86%	▲3.93%	3	▲3
National Democratic Alliance	Marumalarchi Dravida Munnetra Kazhagam	1,602,504	6.26%	▲1.76%	3	▲3
National Democratic Alliance	Janata Party	266,202	1.04%	▲0.28%	1	▲1
National Democratic Alliance	Tamizhaga Rajiv Congress	365,557	1.43%		1	▲1
National Democratic Alliance	Total	12,169,812	47.53%	▲29.47%	30	▲30
United Front	Dravida Munnetra Kazhagam	5,140,266	20.08%	▼5.55%	5	▼12
United Front	Tamil Maanila Congress	5,169,183	20.19%	▼6.81%	3	▼17
United Front	Communist Party of India	628,360	2.45%	▲0.12%	1	▼1
United Front	Total	10,937,809	42.72%	▼12.24%	9	▼30
INC+	Indian National Congress	1,223,102	4.78%	▼13.48%	0	Steady
INC+	MGR Anna Dravida Munnetra Kazhagam	278,324	1.09%	new party	0	new party
INC+	United Communist Party of India	10,018	0.04%	new party	0	new party
INC+	Total	1,511,444	5.91%	▼12.35%	0	Steady
Independents		265,029	1.03%	▼1.97%	0	Steady
Other Parties (10 parties)		719,704	2.81%	▼2.91%	0	Steady
Total		25,603,798	100.00%	Steady	39	Steady
Valid Votes		25,603,798	96.94%			
Invalid Votes		806,904	3.06%			
Total Votes		26,410,702	100.00%			
Registered Voters/Turnout		45,577,788	57.95%	▼8.98%		

†: Seat change represents seats won in terms of the current alliances, which is considerably different from the last election.
‡: Vote % reflects the percentage of votes the party received compared to the entire electorate in Tamil Nadu that voted in this election. Adjusted (Adj.) Vote %, reflects the % of votes the party received per constituency that they contested.
Sources: Election Commission of India

== List of Elected MPs ==
Constituency			Winner				Runner Up				Margin	%
#	Name	Poll %	Candidate	Party	Votes	%	Candidate	Party	Votes	%	Margin	%
1	Madras North	46.58%	C. Kuppusami	DMK	401,322	47.11	R. T. M. Sabapathy Mohan	MDMK	332,229	39.00	69,093	8.11
2	Madras Central	49.50%	Murasoli Maran	DMK	300,774	51.73	D. Jayakumar	ADMK	229,047	39.39	71,727	12.34
3	Madras South	47.35%	T. R. Baalu	DMK	432,913	48.17	Jana Krishnamurthi	BJP	412,899	45.94	20,014	2.23
4	Sriperumbudur (SC)	57.23%	K. Venugopal	ADMK	326,528	46.89	T. Nagaratnam	DMK	302,733	43.48	23,795	3.41
5	Chengalpattu	60.67%	K. Panneerselvam	ADMK	329,239	49.10	K. Parasuraman	DMK	306,323	45.68	22,916	3.42
6	Arakkonam	67.26%	C. Gopal	ADMK	359,431	51.56	A. M. Velu	TMC	309,943	44.46	49,488	7.10
7	Vellore	62.98%	N. T. Shanmugam	PMK	331,035	49.12	T. A. Mohammed Saqhy	DMK	304,630	45.20	26,405	3.92
8	Tiruppattur	63.99%	D. Venugopal	DMK	322,990	47.88	S. Krishnamoorthy	ADMK	322,716	47.83	274	0.05
9	Vandavasi	62.03%	M. Durai	PMK	327,010	50.66	L. Balaraman	TMC	261,935	40.58	65,075	10.08
10	Tindivanam	63.39%	G. N. Ramachandran	MDMK	320,141	49.36	G. Venkatraman	DMK	288,688	44.51	31,453	4.85
11	Cuddalore	61.17%	S. Damodaran	ADMK	309,985	48.84	P. R. S. Venkatesan	TMC	282,856	44.56	27,129	4.28
12	Chidambaram (SC)	64.87%	Dalit Ezhilmalai	PMK	305,372	45.81	C. V. Ganesan	DMK	297,417	44.62	7,955	1.19
13	Dharmapuri	54.42%	K. Pary Mohan	PMK	341,917	55.04	P. Theertharaman	TMC	242,490	39.03	99,427	16.01
14	Krishnagiri	58.08%	K. P. Munusamy	ADMK	315,762	50.71	D. R. Rajaram	TMC	266,413	42.78	49,349	7.93
15	Rasipuram (SC)	54.74%	V. Saroja	ADMK	302,801	52.35	K. Kandasamy	TMC	248,424	42.95	54,377	9.40
16	Salem	57.70%	V. K. Ramamurthy	IND	365,557	55.47	R. Devadass	TMC	229,677	34.85	135,880	20.62
17	Tiruchengode	53.54%	K. Palaniswami	ADMK	414,992	54.70	K. P. Ramalingam	DMK	310,183	40.89	104,809	13.81
18	Nilgiris	55.50%	Master Mathan	BJP	322,818	46.49	S. R. Balasubramaniam	TMC	262,433	37.80	60,385	8.69
19	Gobichettipalayam	61.43%	V. K. Chinnasamy	ADMK	329,753	54.73	N. Ramasamy	DMK	215,111	35.71	114,642	19.02
20	Coimbatore	55.28%	C. P. Radhakrishnan	BJP	449,269	55.85	K. R. Subbian	DMK	304,593	37.86	144,676	17.99
21	Pollachi (SC)	56.42%	M. Thiyagarajan	ADMK	306,083	55.22	Kovai Thangam	TMC	210,682	38.01	95,401	17.21
22	Palani	47.08%	A. Ganeshamurthi	MDMK	286,300	47.08	S. K. Kharventhan	TMC	258,863	42.57	27,437	4.51
23	Dindigul	53.47%	Dindigul C. Sreenivasan	ADMK	276,106	46.55	N. S. V. Chitthan	TMC	260,907	43.98	15,199	2.57
24	Madurai	50.12%	Subramanian Swamy	JNP	266,202	40.48	A. G. S. Ram Babu	TMC	245,305	37.30	20,897	3.18
25	Periyakulam	57.18%	Sedapatti R. Muthiah	ADMK	319,672	53.06	R. Gandhimathy	DMK	249,092	41.34	70,580	11.72
26	Karur	59.84%	M. Thambidurai	ADMK	327,480	50.39	K. Natrayan	TMC	283,807	43.67	43,673	6.72
27	Tiruchirappalli	54.97%	R. Kumaramangalam	BJP	305,233	48.39	L. Adaikalaraj	TMC	293,778	46.57	11,455	1.82
28	Perambalur (SC)	64.56%	P. Rajarethinam	ADMK	341,118	53.37	A. Raja	DMK	280,682	43.91	60,436	9.46
29	Mayiladuthurai	64.97%	K. Krishnamoorthy	TMC	286,098	45.68	P. D. Arulmozhi	PMK	243,642	38.90	42,456	6.78
30	Nagapattinam (SC)	64.75%	M. Selvarasu	CPI	375,589	58.77	Dr. K. Gopal	ADMK	244,286	38.23	131,303	20.54
31	Thanjavur	63.71%	S. S. Palanimanickam	DMK	324,344	51.81	L. Ganesan	MDMK	276,140	44.11	48,204	7.70
32	Pudukkottai	66.81%	Paramasivam Raja	ADMK	288,072	37.25	P. N. Siva	DMK	257,552	33.30	30,520	3.95
33	Sivaganga	57.45%	P. Chidambaram	TMC	303,854	51.15	K. Kalimuthu	ADMK	244,713	41.19	59,141	9.96
34	Ramanathapuram	56.87%	V. Sathiamoorthy	ADMK	258,978	43.83	S. P. Udayappan	TMC	234,886	39.76	24,092	4.07
35	Sivakasi	64.95%	Vaiko	MDMK	387,694	50.68	V. Alagirisamy	CPI	252,771	33.05	134,923	17.63
36	Tirunelveli	56.68%	R. Janarthanan	ADMK	247,823	41.44	R. Sarathkumar	DMK	240,919	40.29	6,904	1.15
37	Tenkasi (SC)	65.29%	S. Murugesan	ADMK	270,053	41.84	M. Arunachalam	TMC	172,786	26.77	97,267	15.07
38	Tiruchendur	53.95%	Ramarajan	ADMK	264,290	49.34	R. Dhanuskodi Athithan	TMC	217,435	40.59	46,855	8.75
39	Nagercoil	58.32%	N. Dennis	TMC	296,611	50.00	Pon Radhakrishnan	BJP	267,426	45.08	29,185	4.92

== Strike Rate ==
Strike rate is determined by calculating the number of seats won by a party of the number of seats it contested.

Alliance/ Party		Seats contested	Seats Won	Strike Rate
NDA	AIADMK	22	18	81.81%
NDA	PMK	5	4	80%
NDA	BJP	5	3	60%
NDA	MDMK	5	3	60%
NDA	JNP	1	1	100%
NDA	TRC	1	1	100%
NDA	Total	39	30	76.92%
UF	TMC(M)	20	3	15.00%
UF	DMK	17	5	29.41%
UF	CPI	2	1	50.00%
UF	Total	39	9	23.07%

== Post-election Union Council of Ministers from Tamil Nadu ==
Source: The Tribune

#	Name	Constituency	Designation	Department	From	To	Party
1	P. R. Kumaramangalam	Tiruchirappalli	Cabinet Minister	Power	19 March 1998	13 October 1999	BJP
1	P. R. Kumaramangalam	Tiruchirappalli	Cabinet Minister	Parliamentary Affairs	30 January 1999	13 October 1999	BJP
1	P. R. Kumaramangalam	Tiruchirappalli	Cabinet Minister	Non-Conventional Energy Sources	3 February 1999	13 October 1999	BJP
1	P. R. Kumaramangalam	Tiruchirappalli	Cabinet Minister	Law, Justice and Company Affairs	9 April 1999	8 June 1999	BJP
2	Vazhappady K. Ramamurthy	Salem	Cabinet Minister	Petroleum and Natural Gas	19 March 1998	13 October 1999	TRC
3	M. Thambidurai	Karur	Cabinet Minister	Law, Justice and Company Affairs	19 March 1998	8 April 1999	AIADMK
3	M. Thambidurai	Karur	Cabinet Minister	Surface Transport	8 April 1998	8 April 1999	AIADMK
4	R. Muthiah (Note: R. Muthiah resigned in just 20 days in office, due to his assets coming into question by the high court in Madras. In a year, cabinet ministers M. Thambidurai resigned along with M.R. Janarthanam, who was the replacement of R. Muthiah, as part of AIADMK's withdrawal from NDA, to start up fresh elections in 1999. Vazhappady Ramamurthy also refused to quit his cabinet ministership, and quit his relationship with AIADMK while keeping its relationship with NDA.)	Periyakulam	Cabinet Minister	Surface Transport	19 March 1998	8 April 1998	AIADMK
5	Dalit Ezhilmalai	Chidambaram (SC)	MoS(I/C)	Health and Family Welfare	20 March 1998	14 August 1999	PMK
6	R. K. Kumar	Rajya Sabha (Tamil Nadu)	MoS	Finance	20 March 1998	22 May 1998	AIADMK
6	R. K. Kumar	Rajya Sabha (Tamil Nadu)	MoS	Parliamentary Affairs	19 March 1998	22 May 1998	AIADMK
7	Kadambur R. Janarthanan	Tirunelveli	MoS	Personnel, Public Grievances and Pensions	20 March 1998	8 April 1999	AIADMK
7	Kadambur R. Janarthanan	Tirunelveli	MoS	Finance	22 May 1998	8 April 1999	AIADMK

== See also ==
- Elections in Tamil Nadu

== Bibliography ==
- Volume I, 1998 Indian general election, 12th Lok Sabha
