= Politics of Tamil Nadu =

Politics related to the Indian state of Tamil Nadu

Politics of Tamil Nadu தமிழ்நாடு அரசியல்
- Emblem of Tamil Nadu
- Part of: India
- Constitution: Constitution of India

Legislative branch
- Name: Tamil Nadu Legislature
- Type: Unicameral
- Meeting place: Fort St. George
- Lower house
- Name: Legislative Assembly
- Presiding officer: J. C. D. Prabhakar, Speaker
- Appointer: First-past-the-post voting

Executive branch
- Head of state
- Title: Governor
- Currently: Rajendra Vishwanath Arlekar
- Appointer: President of India
- Head of government
- Title: Chief Minister
- Currently: C. Joseph Vijay
- Appointer: Governor
- Cabinet
- Name: Council of Ministers
- Current cabinet: C. Joseph Vijay Ministry
- Leader: Chief Minister
- Appointer: Governor

Judicial branch
- Madras High Court
- Chief judge: Sushrut Arvind Dharmadhikari

Politics of Tamil Nadu is the politics related to the Indian state of Tamil Nadu. The politics of Tamil Nadu has largely been dominated by the Dravidian parties of Dravida Munnetra Kazhagam (DMK) and All India Anna Dravida Munnetra Kazhagam (AIADMK). The DMK has first won in the 1967 Tamil Nadu Legislative Assembly elections, putting the consistent 20 years of the Indian Nation Congress (INC) to an end. The AIADMK won in 1977 putting the continuous 10 years of DMK rule to an end. The Tamilagam Vetri Kazhagam (TVK) won in the 2026 Tamil Nadu Legislative Assembly election putting an end to the DMK or AIADMK dominated government since 1977.

== History ==
=== Formation of Tamil Nadu ===
The region of Tamil Nadu indicates historical records of human habitation at least for 3,800 years. The current state of Tamil Nadu was formed by renaming Madras State on 14 January 1969. After the independence of India, the Telugu and Malayalam parts of Madras state were separated from Tamilagam state in 1956, it was renamed Tamil Nadu on January 14, 1969, by the state government.

=== Pre-Dravidian politics of Tamil Nadu ===
The era of pre-Dravidian politics of Tamil Nadu is dominated by the Indian National Congress (INC). The Indian National Congress was the ruling party of Tamil Nadu for the first twenty years after independence, until a Dravidian party, the Dravida Munnetra Kazhagam (DMK), swept the 1967 elections. Power has since shifted between the two major Dravidian parties of the state, the Dravida Munnetra Kazhagam, and the All India Anna Dravida Munnetra Kazhagam (AIADMK).

K. Kamaraj was the most influential leader during the Congress era in Tamil Nadu. Kamaraj was instrumental in the ascension and downfall of the first six Chief Ministers of Tamil Nadu following independence: T. Prakasam, O.P. Ramaswamy Reddiar, Kumaraswamy Raja, C. Rajagopalachari, M. Bhakthavatsalam, and himself. Kamaraj originally threw his support behind T. Prakasam to prevent C. Rajagopalachari from becoming Chief Minister in 1946, however, Kamaraj felt it was too difficult to control Prakasam as he was Telugu and didn't feel the need to report to the Tamil Nadu Congress Committee. Kamaraj facilitated the ouster of Prakasam and the ascension of O.P. Ramaswamy Reddiar as Chief Minister in 1947. Ramaswamy and Kamaraj eventually had a falling out which led to Ramaswamy's downfall though he was Tamil and originally became Chief Minister with Kamaraj's support. Kamaraj eventually elevated Kumaraswamy Raja to the position of Chief Minister in 1949—a position which Raja retained till he lost his seat in the general election of 1952.

The general election of 1952 temporarily reduced the Congress Party to a minority in the state legislative assembly. Though Congress held the most seats in the state legislative assembly—152 out of 375, they did not meet the required 188 seats to prove a governing majority. In response, communist parties began to build a post-election coalition challenging the Congress party. The coalition, the United Democratic Front (UDF), comprised 30 independents as well as the Communist Party of India (CPI) and CPI backed independents, Kisan Mazdoor Praja Party (KMPP), Tamil Nadu Toilers Party, Commonweal Party, Forward Block (Marxist Group) also known as FBL (MG), All India Scheduled Caste Federation (SCF), and Justice Party (JUSP). With 166 legislative seats, the UDF staked their claim to form a government. The Governor at the time, Maharaja Krishna Kumarsinhji Bhavsinhji, decided to refer the matter to the President of India, Rajendra Prasad, rather than cause controversy at the end of his term as governor. Per the Constitution, the President sought the advice of the Prime Minister, Jawaharlal Nehru, who was unable to make a decision on the matter. With the situation at a standstill, Kamaraj was in favor of allowing the UDF to form a government as he believed the coalition government would be short-lived thus providing an opportunity for Congress to gain power back. However, many were opposed to Kamaraj's proposal as they were outraged by the possibility of a Communist government, and turned to Rajagopalachari, a staunch anti-Communist, to lead the government as Chief Minister. Set to lead the state government, Rajagopalachari decided he would not seek election to the state legislature as he believed it was below his status. As Rajagopalachari would not seek election to the lower house of the state legislature, the interim Chief Minister, Kumaraswamy Raja, promptly recommended Rajagopalachari's appointment to the upper house of the state legislature, and the new governor, Sri Prakasa, swiftly accepted the recommendation. Rajagopalachari was then invited by Prakasa to form the state government and asked to prove his majority in the state legislature. Rajagopalachari proved a majority more than three months later by convincing opposition members to defect, and allying himself with parties that had not joined the UDF.

Kamaraj increased his stronghold over Tamil Nadu politics following the separation of the Telugu-speaking areas from Tamil Nadu in 1953, and facilitated the removal of Rajagopalachari as Chief Minister in 1954 after Rajagopalachari's implementation of the unpopular Modified Scheme of Elementary Education. Kamaraj then ascended to the Chief Ministership himself, and would remain in that position for the next nine years.

As Chief Minister, Kamaraj paid special attention to education as that was the issue that led to his predecessor's downfall. Education was made compulsory and free to all children till the age of 14. 25,234 schools were opened between 1954 and 1962 so that villages with populations greater than 500 had at least one or more schools. At the same time, secondary education was restructured—mathematics, science, and social studies were made compulsory subjects, and students were provided the opportunity to learn their language of choice as well as Hindi and English. Enrollment in primary and secondary schools doubled from 1955 to 1962. By 1954, the state government had opened 140 training schools for teachers. In 1955, the Tamil Nadu government was the first in Asia to provide a provident fund, pensions, and insurance for teachers. The School Midday Meal Scheme launched in 1957 as an incentive to increase enrollment. Beginning in 1960, school uniforms were provided free of cost to children. The state government implemented the School Improvement Movement in 1958 which led to 24,656 schools receiving donations worth about 7,93,00,000 rupees from the public by 1963.

Irrigation was another major focus of the Tamil Nadu government as Kamaraj believed improved irrigation would increase food production and wanted to utilize the hydroelectric capabilities of dams and reservoirs. Nine large-scale irrigation projects reaching about 3,34,000 acres were completed by the state government during the first five-year plan (1951–1956) for a total cost of about 29,00,00,000 rupees. Another six irrigation projects reaching about 2,92,000 acres were completed during the second five-year plan (1965–1961). The state government pursued multiple large-scale power generation projects to improve electrification—22,103 villages had electricity in 1966, up from 813 villages in 1951. Five industrial zones were created throughout the state to spur growth in heavy industries and multiple industrial estates were created to encourage smaller industries. The Madras Cultivating Tenants Act of 1956 and the Madras Land Reforms Act of 1962 improved farmers rights. Social welfare schemes aimed at improving conditions for scheduled castes and scheduled tribes as well as women were implemented. Tamil became the official language of the state in 1958, and the first Tamil encyclopedia published by the Tamil Academy was presented in 1962.

Kamaraj resigned in 1963 to focus on the revival of the Congress party. M. Bhakthavatsalam succeeded Kamaraj and would remain Chief Minister until the election of 1967, when power shifted to the Dravida Munnetra Kazhagam.

=== Rise of Dravidian politics ===
Dravidian parties have dominated state politics since 1967. One of the earliest regional parties was the South Indian Welfare Association, which was founded in 1916. It came to be known as the Justice Party after the name of its English-language daily, Justice. Periyar E. V. Ramasamy, renamed the party Dravidar Kazhagam in 1944. DK was a non-political party which demanded the establishment of an independent state called Dravida Nadu. However, due to the differences between its two leaders Periyar and C. N. Annadurai, the party was split. Annadurai left the party to form the Dravida Munnetra Kazhagam (DMK). The DMK decided to enter into politics in 1956.

The Anti-Hindi agitations in the mid-1960s made the DMK more popular and more powerful political force in the state. The DMK routed the Indian National Congress party in the 1967 elections and took control of the state government, ending Congress's stronghold in Tamil Nadu. C. N. Annadurai became the DMK's first Chief Minister, and M. Karunanidhi took over as Chief Minister and party leader after Annadurai's death in 1969. Karunanidhi's leadership was soon challenged by M. G. Ramachandran, popularly known as M.G.R. In 1972, he split from DMK and formed the All India Anna Dravida Munnetra Kazhagam (AIADMK). He was the Chief Minister of the state from 1977 until his death in 1987. After the death of M.G.R, the party split again into two factions, one led by J. Jayalalithaa, and other led by V. N. Janaki Ramachandran, wife of M.G.R. After the defeat of AIADMK in 1989 assembly polls, both factions were merged and Jayalalithaa took control of the party. She was elected as the general secretary of the unified AIADMK. There have been splits in both the DMK and the AIADMK, but since 1967 one of those two parties has held power in the state. In the State elections after M. G. Ramachandran's death, neither of the two parties could come back to power in consecutive assembly elections. Governments were formed by: DMK in 1989, AIADMK in 1991, DMK alliance in 1996, AIADMK alliance in 2001, DMK alliance in 2006 and AIADMK alliance consecutively in 2011 and 2016.

=== Tamil nationalism in politics ===
Tamil Nationalism has been part of the Tamil political arena since the late 19th century. Nationalist parties include Naam Tamilar Katchi (NTK), which was revived in 2010 led by Seeman.

During the Anti Hindi Imposition Movement, the Tamil Nationalist organizations converged with Dravidian parties on the common ground of Protecting and Promoting Tamil. In the next oncoming decades, the relevance of the Tamil Nationalist Parties reduced to a great degree. Still many Tamil Nationalist organizations keep on working on promotion of Tamil identity.

Such parties and their policies can be classified into a wider spectrum. There are organizations which claim every person with an intent to promote Tamil identity as a Tamil. At the same time, few elements classify and deny Tamil identity to the people of Tamil Nadu based on Caste lines, which is in total contrast to the former type.

After the death of Velupillai Prabhakaran, a revival, even though not a big enough to create an impact in political balance, is seen. The success of this new wave is yet to be seen.

RISE OF NEWER POLITICAL PARTIES:-

Actor c.joseph vijay launched a new political party named tamilaga vetri kalagam(tvk) in 2024. Tvk organized campaigns in social media targeting women and youth on themes of anti-corruption, inequality and social justice. Tvk emerged as the single largest party in the 2026 tamilnadu assembly general elections and vijay had become the chief minister via a post-election coalition thus effectively ending the streak of dravidian parties which alternated from 1967 to 2026.

== Political culture of Tamil Nadu ==
=== Social welfare schemes ===
Politics in Tamil Nadu has had a strongly socialist character since the rise of Dravidian politics in the 1960s. In Tamil Nadu, AIADMK and DMK are alternately elected by people in Tamil Nadu but in the 2026 state election the TVK party won, marking the first time since 1977 a party that is not DMK or AIADMK to win. Both AIADMK and DMK, the major political parties in Tamil Nadu, as per their political and economic policy, made sure that the people of the state receive the fruits of the modern technology. Whichever party was in the rule, made sure that all the households have a television set, the womenfolk have access to work on the economy of their family by providing them household appliances and the students have all the necessary tools to reach and complete their education namely bicycle, textbooks, stationery and laptops.

At the same time, the promise of and distribution of freebies is considered and criticized to be a form of bribery, disguised as people welfare. The right wing political parties and economists feel that the fiscal profligacy and handouts don't make economic sense and, importantly, they tend to make people lazy. The leftists and the left leaning parties have raised concerns about the revenue model used for financing the freebie schemes. They accuse the two parties of depoliticizing the electorate and bribing the voters to turn blind eye to the corruptions of the regimes These social welfare schemes provide the Dravidian faction of the Tamil Nadu politics an edge over the other regional and national parties.

=== Caste politics ===
Tamil Nadu has seen numerous caste based parties, serving two purposes. Either to represent the genuine concerns of the oppressed communities or to create Votebanks for ruling parties.

The Dalit political parties, representing the oppressed societies have been fighting for social justice. Typically reservation in education and job opportunities are demanded by such parties. In Tamil Nadu such parties are also supporters of Tamil Nationalism. Rarely some of the parties have claimed that the castes they represent are oppressed by being declared a part of the Scheduled castes list. They demand removal of their caste from Scheduled castes list and to rename their caste.

However, people from the relatively upper castes also have founded political parties. They fear that their opportunities are robbed by the concessions extended to the SC and ST communities. They have demanded to get their castes declared as backward to avail reservation.

The effect of the caste politics is debatable and could not be expected to end in near future. In 2001, the sitting DMK government came up with a huge alliance with caste parties and was defeated in 2001 assembly election. Still caste based political parties are part of both the ruling and opposition alliances in all the successive elections.

=== Socio-regional support base in Tamil Nadu politics ===
The Vanniyars and Mudaliars of the northern districts of Tamil Nadu, which were historically considered strongholds of Dravida Munnetra Kazhagam, with Mudaliars having long been associated with support for the Dravidian movement since the days of the Justice Party, dating back nearly a century. Even before the electoral rise of the DMK, Vanniyar community leaders from erstwhile North arcot and south arcot districts such as S. S. Ramasamy Padayachi and M. A. Manickavelu Naicker, through the Commonweal Party and Tamil Nadu Toilers' Party in first general elections in 1952, secured legislative representation and prevented the Congress party an outright majority in the composite Madras State, after which Rajaji formed the government by negotiating support. However, since the late 1980s, the Pattali Makkal Katchi (PMK) has increasingly consolidated the Vanniyar vote bank. In 2000s, Vijayakanth of the Desiya Murpokku Dravida Kazhagam (DMDK) won from Virudhachalam and Rishivandhiyam from erswhile South arcot region, where socially amd economically backward Vanniyars and Adi-Dravidars are predominant, indicating a shift in vote share from the PMK, in a region where his films had enjoyed a strong theatrical presence in northern Tamil Nadu. DMDK had support among sections of the Telugu speaking communities, particularly in southern Tamil Nadu, where Vijayakanth hails from, and which had earlier shown backing for Vaiko’s MDMK. Chennai and the Eastern Cauvery delta region continue to remain traditional strongholds of the DMK. Despite the presence of parties such as the Indian Union Muslim League and the Tamil Nadu Muslim Munnetra Kazhagam, Christians and Muslims, who together constitute roughly 15% of Tamil Nadu, have largely supported the DMK, with the ADMK typically securing only around 10% of the minority vote. Traditionally, the OBCs like Konars, The Delta Kallar and Agamudayar subsects of Thevar community, Nadars and the socially backward Devendrakula Vellalars of the south have mostly voted for the DMK.

By portraying fishermen in Padagotti (1964) and Meenava Nanban (1977), M. G. Ramachandran (MGR) endeared himself to coastal fishing communities like Meenavars, many of whom shifted their support from the DMK to the All India Anna Dravida Munnetra Kazhagam (AIADMK) after he founded the party. Similarly, Dalits and Maravars were traditionally aligned with the Congress under K. Kamaraj’s leadership and later transitioned towards the AIADMK following his demise and the subsequent realignment of political forces in Tamil Nadu. Since its inception, the AIADMK has maintained significant influence in the western Kongu region, bolstered by efforts from MGR and his supporters to associate him with the Kongu Vellalar (Gounder) community through historical, cultural and literary narratives. Its traditional support base has also included communities such as Mutharaiyars, and backward-class groups in the parts of southern and central Tamil Nadu, particularly among the subsects of Thevar community, including Piramalai Kallars and Maravars in southern Tamil Nadu. For the Arunthathiyars, Madurai Veeran is their traditional deity, and M. G. Ramachandran’s portrayal of the folk hero in the 1956 film Madurai Veeran struck a chord with the community, leading them to support him after he founded the AIADMK and later continued their support to Jayalalithaa. The Narikuravars have been known to support the AIADMK, a trend often attributed to its founder MGR, whose films such as Navarathinam (1977) and Oli Vilakku (1968) featured sympathetic portrayals of nomadic and marginalized communities.

Although electoral “wave” elections have often produced near-uniform results across regions and party affiliations, there have been notable exceptions. The DMK has consistently retained major seats in Chennai and the Thanjavur region, including during the AIADMK wave victories of 1977 and 2001. In contrast, the AIADMK gradually expanded its presence in Chennai over subsequent elections and, by 2011, achieved a significant sweep of the chennai city's constituencies.

Tamilaga Vettri Kazhagam's victory in the 2026 Tamil Nadu Legislative Assembly election demonstrated the electoral impact of youth mobilization and broad cross-caste support, challenging the traditional caste arithmetic and alliance strategies of the Dravidian parties and emerging as the election's dark horse.

=== Celebrity worship ===
Many people from the Tamil film industry are active in Tamil Nadu politics. Some of the Chief Ministers of Tamil Nadu like Joseph Vijay, M. Karunanidhi, M. G. Ramachandran and J. Jayalalithaa have their background in the Tamil film industry. Kamal Haasan who enjoys a great stardom entered into Tamil Nadu politics in 2018 by starting his own political party. Rajinikanth who is enjoying a popular status in Tamil Nadu was in the race to start a political party in 2020, later reverted the decision due to health issues during covid pandemic. The worship of party leader by members is widely spread in Tamil Nadu, sometimes it reaches a fanatical level. This worship culture originates during the era of M.G.R.

The youngsters were often a factor that changes the dynamic of Tamil Nadu politics, what can be seen in Anti-Hindi agitations of Tamil Nadu, 2013 Anti–Sri Lanka protests and 2017 pro-jallikattu protests.

== Political parties in Tamil Nadu ==
Political parties in Tamil Nadu are historically dominated by two major parties, Dravida Munnetra Kazhagam (DMK) and the All India Anna Dravida Munnetra Kazhagam (AIADMK); since 2026, a plurality of members and the chief minister are members of a third state party, Tamilaga Vettri Kazhagam (TVK) . There are also several significant national parties like Indian National Congress (INC), Bharatiya Janata Party (BJP), Communist Party of India (Marxist) (CPIM), Communist Party of India (CPI). Major parties includes Naam Tamilar Katchi Viduthalai Siruththaigal Katchi(VCK), Pattali Makkal Katchi (PMK), Kongu Munnetra Kazhagam (KMK), and minority parties include Desiya Murpokku Dravida Kazhagam (DMDK), Tamil Maanila Congress (TMC), Makkal Needhi Maiam (MNM), Amma Makkal Munnetra Kazhagam (AMMK), Tamizhaga Vazhvurimai Katchi (TVMK), Marumalarchi Dravida Munnetra Kazhagam (MDMK), Naam Tamilar Katchi (NTK), Dravidar Kazhagam (DK), Perunthalaivar Makkal Katchi (PMK), Anna Dravida Kazhagam (ADK), Puthiya Tamilagam (PT), Indhiya Jananayaga Katchi (IJK), Mukkulathor Pulipadai (MP), Manithaneya Makkal Katchi (MMK), Tamil Desiya Katchi (TDK), Tamilar Vidiyal Katchi (TVK), Anaithu Makkal Arasiyal Katchi (AMAK), Lok Janshakti Party (LJP), Republican Party of India (RPI), Bahujan Samaj Party (BSP), Nationalist Congress Party (NCP), All India Forward Bloc (AIFB) .
