= S. Ambethkumar =

Indian politician

Member of the Tamil Nadu Legislative Assembly
- Incumbent
- Assumed office 20 May 2016
- Preceded by: V. Gunaseelan
- Constituency: Vandavasi

Personal details
- Political party: Dravida Munnetra Kazhagam

S. Ambethkumar is an Indian politician who is a Member of Legislative Assembly of Tamil Nadu. He was elected from Vandavasi as a Dravida Munnetra Kazhagam candidate in 2021.

== Electoral performance ==
2021 Tamil Nadu Legislative Assembly election: Vandavasi
| Party | Candidate | Votes | % | ±% |
|---|---|---|---|---|
| DMK | S. Ambethkumar | 102,064 | 55.41% | +11.21 |
| PMK | S. Murali | 66,111 | 35.89% | +22.51 |
| NTK | G. Prabavathi | 9,284 | 5.04% | New |
| NOTA | NOTA | 1,769 | 0.96% | −0.37 |
| AMMK | P. Venkatesan | 1,728 | 0.94% | New |
| MNM | S. Suresh | 1,692 | 0.92% | New |
| Independent | K. Manikandan | 1,264 | 0.69% | New |
| Margin of victory | | 35,953 | 19.52% | 9.56% |
| Turnout | | 184,205 | 76.58% | −5.00% |
| Rejected ballots | | 347 | 0.19% | |
| Registered electors | | 240,533 | | |
| DMK hold | | Swing | 11.21% | |

2016 Tamil Nadu Legislative Assembly election: Vandavasi
| Party | Candidate | Votes | % | ±% |
|---|---|---|---|---|
| DMK | S. Ambethkumar | 80,206 | 44.20% | −0.28 |
| AIADMK | V. Meganathan | 62,138 | 34.24% | −17.81 |
| PMK | Vadivel Ravanan | 24,277 | 13.38% | New |
| VCK | M. K. Metharamesh | 7,745 | 4.27% | New |
| NOTA | NOTA | 2,421 | 1.33% | New |
| IJK | J. Sudha | 1,079 | 0.59% | New |
| Margin of victory | | 18,068 | 9.96% | 2.38% |
| Turnout | | 181,476 | 81.58% | −0.02% |
| Registered electors | | 222,453 | | |
| DMK gain from AIADMK | | Swing | -7.85% | |
