= Tindivanam Lok Sabha constituency =

Lok Sabha constituency

Coordinates: 12.2°N 79.6°E

Tindivanam
- Former Lok Sabha constituency
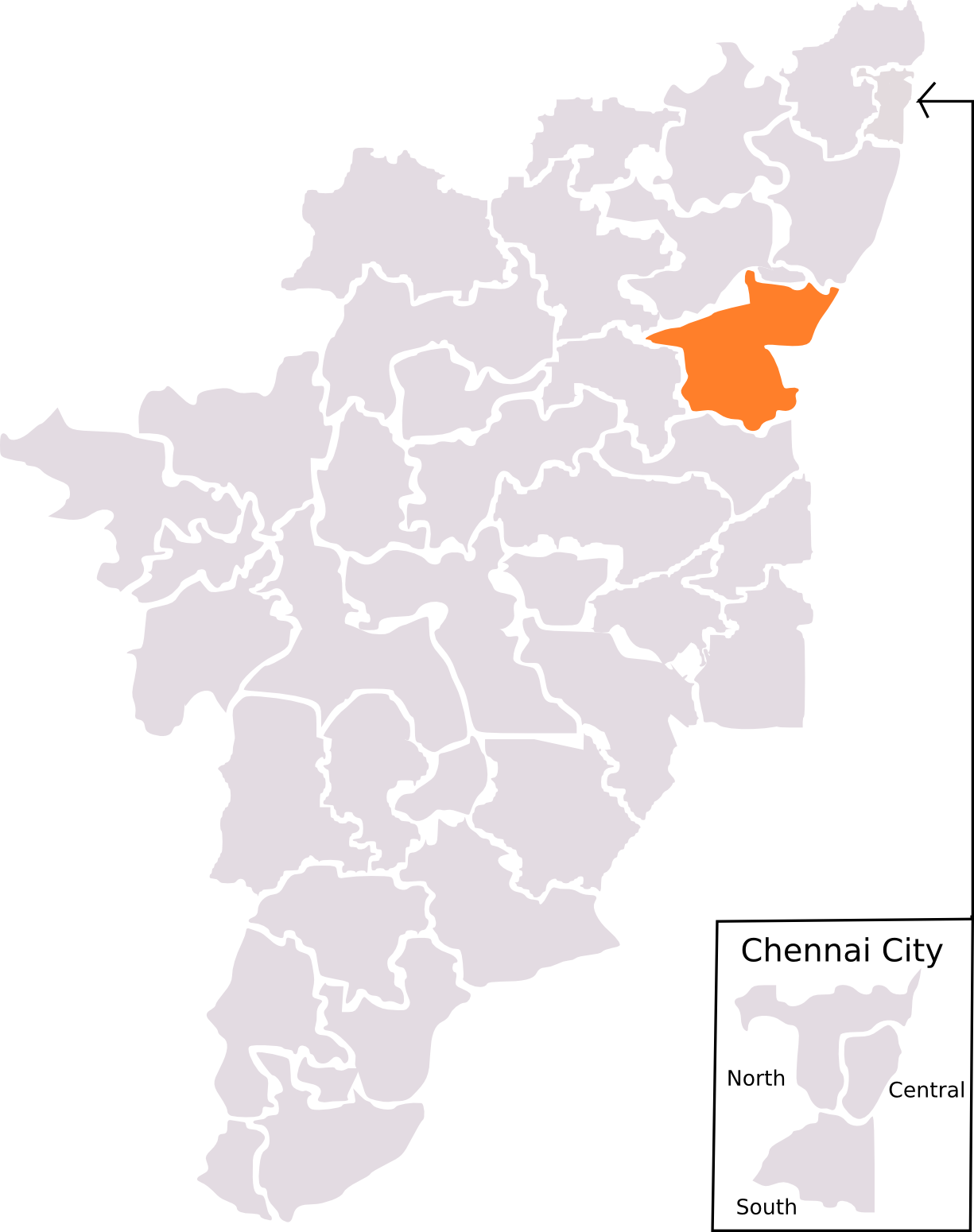
- Tindivanam constituency, 1971 delimitation.

Constituency details
- Country: India
- Region: South India
- State: Tamil Nadu
- Established: 1952
- Abolished: 2009

Tindivanam was a Lok Sabha (Parliament of India) constituency in Tamil Nadu. After delimitation in 2009, it is defunct.

== Assembly segments ==
Tindivanam Lok Sabha constituency was composed of the following assembly segments:

1. Tindivanam (moved to Viluppuram constituency)
2. Vanur (SC) (moved to Viluppuram constituency)
3. Kandamangalam (SC)
4. Villupuram (moved to Viluppuram constituency)
5. Mugaiyur
6. Thirunavalur

== Members of the Parliament ==
Year	Name	Party
1952	A. Jayaraman	Tamil Nadu Toilers' Party
1952	V. Muniswami	Tamil Nadu Toilers' Party
1957	Shanmugham	Independent
1962	R. Venkatasubha Reddiar	Indian National Congress
1967	T. D. R. Naidu	Dravida Munnetra Kazhagam
1971	M. R. Lakshmi Narayanan	Indian National Congress
1977	M. R. Lakshmi Narayanan	Indian National Congress
1980	S. S. Ramasami Padayachi	Indian National Congress
1984	S. S. Ramasami Padayachi	Indian National Congress
1989	S.S.R.Ramadass	Indian National Congress
1991	K. Rama Murthee	Indian National Congress
1996	T. G. Venkatraman	Dravida Munnetra Kazhagam
1998	N. Ramachandran Gingee	Marumalarchi Dravida Munnetra Kazhagam
1999	N. Ramachandran Gingee	Marumalarchi Dravida Munnetra Kazhagam
2004	K. Dhanaraju	Pattali Makkal Katchi

== Election results ==
Vote share of Winning candidates
2004	50.40%
1999	46.5%
1998	47.4%
1996	50.7%
1991	52.8%
1989	45.4%
1984	63.7%
1980	63.7%
1977	52.3%
1971	51.5%
1967	47.9%
1962	46.6%
1957	36.4%
1952	55.1%

=== 2004 ===
2004 Indian general elections: Tindivanam
Party	Candidate	Votes	%	±%
PMK	K. Dhanaraju	367,849	50.40	n/a
AIADMK	Arunmozhithevan. A	276,685	37.91	n/a
JD(U)	Gopalakrishnan. P	29,915	4.10	n/a
Independent	Mohamed Ali Jinna. M	10,987	1.51	+1.43
Independent	Perumal. S	8,083	1.11	n/a
Majority		91,164	12.49	+11.15
Turnout		729,863	62.98	+1.33
PMK gain from MDMK		Swing	+50.40	

=== General Election 1999 ===
Party	Candidate	Votes	%
MDMK	Gingee Ramachandran	323,234	46.5%
INC	Thindivanam K.Ramamoorthy	313,884	45.1%
TMC(M)	S.P.Subramaniam	40,879	5.9%
RJD	G.Veeramuthu	2,113	0.3%
Ajey Bharath Party	G.Rhagavan	1,404	0.2%
Majority		9,350	1.3%
Turnout		695,793	61.6%
MDMK Hold			

=== General Election 1998 ===
Party	Candidate	Votes	%
MDMK	Gingee Ramachandran	320,141	47.4%
DMK	G.Venkatraman	288,688	42.8%
INC	Thindivanam K.Ramamoorthy	29,908	4.4%
Majority		31,453	4.7%
Turnout		675,110	63.4%
MDMK gain from DMK			

=== General Election 1996 ===
Party	Candidate	Votes	%
DMK	G.Venkatraman	367,308	50.7%
INC	Thindivanam K.Ramamoorthy	177,032	24.4%
PMK	A.K.Zainuddin	79,535	11.0%
MDMK	D.Durai	37,025	5.1%
BJP	S.Baskaran	6,047	0.8%
Majority		190,276	26.3%
Turnout		724,103	70.0%
DMK gain from INC			

=== General Election 1991 ===
Party	Candidate	Votes	%
INC	Thindivanam K.Ramamoorthy	341,971	52.8%
DMK	N.Dhayanithi	171,822	26.5%
PMK	S.Shanmugam	103,524	16.0%
Majority		170,149	26.3%
Turnout		647,691	67.9%
INC Hold			

=== General Election 1989 ===
Party	Candidate	Votes	%
INC	Era.Ramadoss	299,184	45.4%
DMK	N.Dhayanithi	198,469	30.1%
PMK	S.Shanmugam	142,996	21.7%
Tharasu Makkal Mandram	P.Elangovan	3,446	0.5%
Majority		100,715	15.3%
Turnout		658,615	68.7%
INC Hold			

=== General Election 1984 ===
Party	Candidate	Votes	%
INC	S.S.Ramasamy Padayachi	356,127	63.7%
JP	M.R.Lakshminarayanan	154,269	28.0%
IND	S.Sekar	9,759	1.8%
Majority		201,858	36.6%
Turnout		551,174	74.7%
INC Hold			

=== General Election 1980 ===
Party	Candidate	Votes	%
INC	S.S.Ramasamy Padayachi	290,069	63.7%
AIADMK	V.Munusamy	133,171	29.3%
IND	K.V.Bhuvarangamoorthy	10,440	2.3%
IND	S.Rajamani	9,160	2.0%
Majority		156,898	34.5%
Turnout		455,048	63.4%
INC Hold			

=== General Election 1977 ===
Party	Candidate	Votes	%
INC	M.R.Lakshminarayanan	233,155	52.3%
DMK	V.Krishnamoorthy	183,670	41.2%
IND	V.Kanagaraj	8,615	1.9%
Majority		49,485	11.1%
Turnout		446,012	68.7%
INC Hold			

=== General Election 1971 ===
Party	Candidate	Votes	%
INC	M.R.Lakshminarayanan	212,309	51.5%
SWP	M.P.Radhakrishnan	150,834	36.6%
IND	R.K.Annasamy	16,542	4.0%
Majority		61,475	14.9%
Turnout		379,685	66.1%
INC gain from DMK			

=== General Election 1967 ===
Party	Candidate	Votes	%
DMK	T.D.R.Naidu	201,009	47.9%
INC	Lakshminarayanan	168,939	40.3%
IND	Kulasekharan	20,029	4.8%
IND	D.P.Chettiar	15,736	3.8%
Majority		32,070	7.6%
Turnout		405,713	74.2%
DMK gain from INC			

=== General Election 1962 ===
Party	Candidate	Votes	%
INC	R.Venkatasubha Reddy	132,330	46.6%
SWP	K.Ramamoorthy gounder	118,033	41.6%
IND	N.P.Shanmuga gounder	23,356	8.2%
Majority		14,297	5.0%
Turnout		273,719	62.0%
INC gain from IND			

=== General Election 1957 ===
Party	Candidate	Votes	%
IND	Shanmugham	73,737	36.4%
IND	V.Munusami	65,012	32.1%
INC	Nagarajan	64,082	31.6%
Majority		8,725	
Turnout		202,831	48.5%
IND gain from Tamil Nadu Toilers' Party			

=== General Election 1952 ===
Party	Candidate	Votes	%
Tamil Nadu Toilers' Party	A.Jayaraman	220,670	27.9%
Tamil Nadu Toilers' Party	V.Munusami	214,772	27.2%
INC	V.I.Munusamy Pillai	152,306	19.3%
INC	Ramnath Goenka	122,561	15.5%
Majority		5,898	
Turnout		789,592	109.4%
Tamil Nadu Toilers' Party Win (New Seat)			

== See also ==
- Tindivanam
- List of constituencies of the Lok Sabha
