= Vazhappady K. Ramamurthy =

Indian politician

Vazhapadi Ramamoorthy
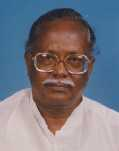

Member of Parliament, Lok Sabha
- In office 1998–1999
- Constituency: Salem, Tamil Nadu
- In office 1980–1996
- Constituency: Krishnagiri, Tamil Nadu
- In office 1977–1980
- Constituency: Dharmapuri, Tamil Nadu

Minister of Petroleum and Natural Gas, Government of India
- In office 19 March 1998 – 13 October 1999
- Prime Minister: A. B. Vajpayee

President of the Tamil Nadu Congress Committee
- In office 1989–1995
- Preceded by: G. K. Moopanar
- Succeeded by: Kumari Anandan

Personal details
- Born: 18 January 1940
- Died: 27 October 2002 (aged 62)
- Party: Tamizhaga Rajiv Congress (1998–2002)
- Other political affiliations: Dravidar Kazhagam (1950–1960); Tamil National Party (1961–1964); Indian National Congress (1967–1996); Tiwari Congress (1996–1998)
- Parent(s): Father : Kootha Padaiyatchi; Mother : Palaniyammal
- Occupation: Politician; Lawyer

Vazhapadi Kootha padayatchi Ramamoorthy or Vazhapadiyar (Short Name) (18 January 1940 – 27 October 2002) was an Indian trade unionist and politician.

== Political career ==
He was an ardent follower of the late K Kamaraj and E. V. K. Sampath owne political party Tamil National Party Jointed He belonged to the Vanniyar community.

He served as the President of Tamil Nadu Congress Committee. From 1989 to 1995, he was the Youth Congress President of Salem, Tamil Nadu.

Ramamurthy was elected as a member of the Lok Sabha six times and was defeated twice, in 1996 and 1999. He was involved with the International Labour Organization and for a brief period in 1991 served as minister of state for Labour with independent charge in the Congress government led by P. V. Narasimha Rao. He quit his ministerial post on the Cauvery issue.

He was president of the TNCC for six years before being replaced in 1996 when he formed the Tamil Nadu unit of the Tiwari Congress. Ramamurthy went back to the Congress but left that party again to form Tamizhaga Rajiv Congress (TRC). He was part of NDA and become Minister of Petroleum and Natural Gas in 1998-1999. With the creation of the TRC, he subsequently announced that it would have an alliance with AIADMK in the upcoming Lok Sabha election. A few days later, J. Jayalalithaa announced that the TRC was entering the AIADMK-led front, although she denied having engineered the split in the Congress. In January 2002, after eight years, Ramamurthy merged the TRC with Congress.

== Trade Union ==
Ramamurthy was associated with various trade unions and workers' organizations, serving as honorary president of INTUC Tamil Nadu, Founder-President of the International Institute for Non-aligned Studies, Vice-President of INTUC, Tamil Nadu, and founding member and president of Indian National Rural Labour Federation INRLF, a labour union formed for agricultural and unorganized rural workers.

== Tamizhaga Rajiv Congress ==
Tamizhaga Rajiv Congress was a regional political party in Tamil Nadu, India. TRC was formed when Vazhapadi Ramamurthy split from the Indian National Congress. TRC merged with Congress in 2002.

== Electoral records ==
He was Member of Parliament elected from Tamil Nadu. He was elected to the Lok Sabha as an Indian National Congress candidate from Dharmapuri constituency in the 1977 election and from Krishnagiri constituency in the 1980 1984, 1989 and 1991 elections. He was elected from Krishnagiri constituency as an Indian National Congress (Indira) candidate in the 1980 election. He was elected from Salem constituency as an Independent candidate in the 1998 election.

== Parliament Committees ==
1977-79 Member, Committee on Papers Laid on the Table; Member, Business Advisory Committee; Member, Consultative Committee, Ministry of Labour; Deputy Chief Whip, Congress Parliamentary Party, (Indira) [C.P.P.(I)]

1980 Member, Committee on Public Undertakings; Member, Business Advisory Committee; Member, Committee on Privileges; Member, Consultative Committee, Ministry of Labour

1985-87 Chairman, Committee on Public Undertakings;Committee on Public Undertakings

1986-89 Member, Committee on Public Accounts; Member, Consultative Committee, Ministry of Labor

1990 Member, Committee of Privileges, Member, Consultative Committee, Ministry of Labor and Welfare

== Personal life ==
His wife, R Kalaimani, was a retired teacher, and they shared two sons and a daughter. His eldest son, Vazhapadi Rama Suganthan, is an AICC member, INRLF National General Secretary and Tamilnadu State President.He is also Chairman of Rajiv Gandhi Vazhapadi K Ramamurthy Charitable trust, while his younger son, Vazhapadi R Karnan, is General Secretary of INRLF Tamil Nadu state. Ramamurthy died in Chennai on 27 October 2002.

== See also ==
- Indian National Congress breakaway parties
- Politics of Tamil Nadu
