= Tamizhaga Rajiv Congress =

Defunct regional political party in Tamil Nadu, India

Tamizhaga Rajiv Congress தமிழக ராஜீவ் காங்கிரஸ்
- Abbreviation: TRC
- Leader: Vazhapadi K. Ramamurthy
- Founder: Vazhapadi K. Ramamurthy
- Founded: 1996
- Dissolved: 2002
- Merged into: Indian National Congress
- Headquarters: Tamil Nadu, India

Election symbol
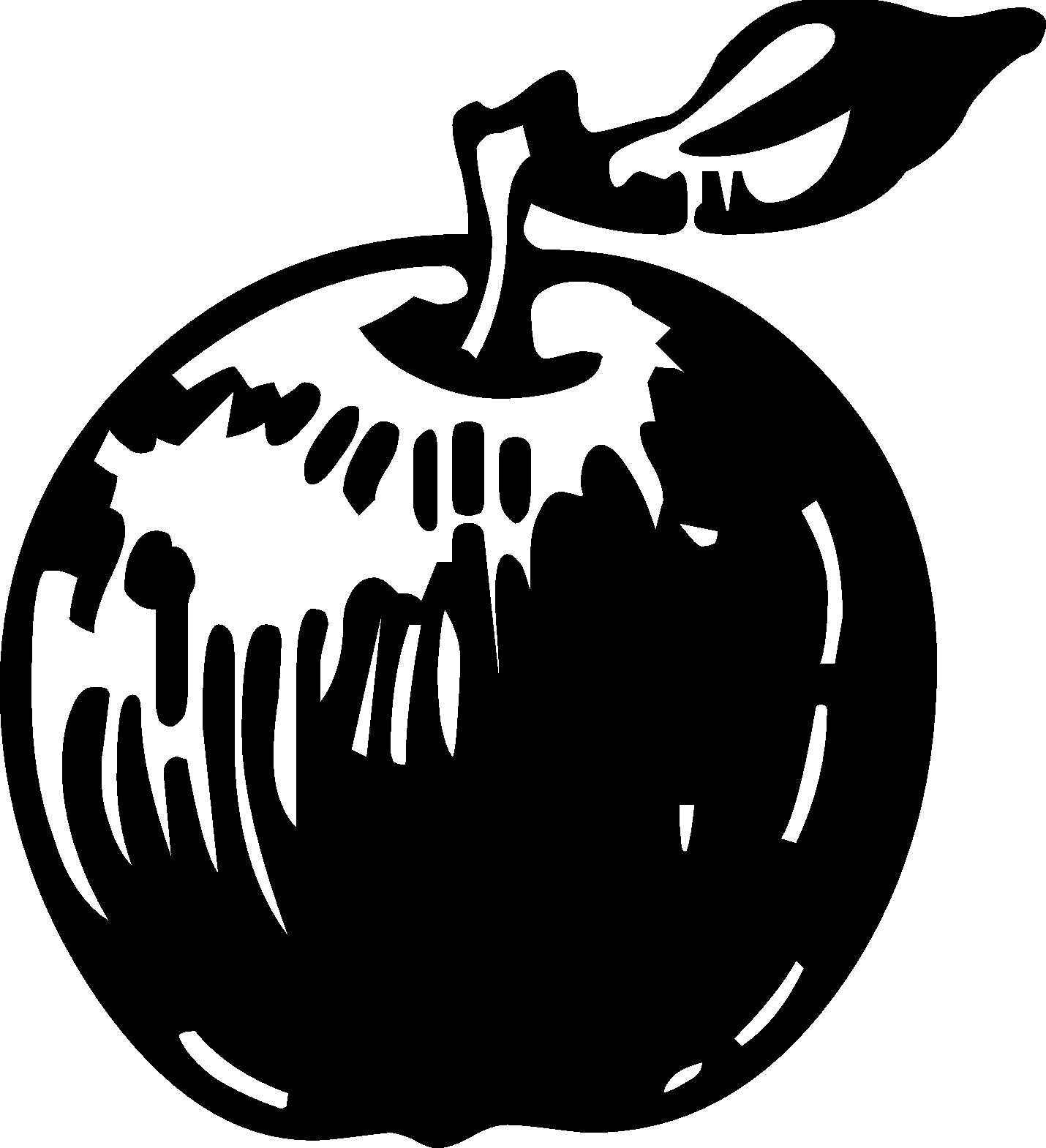

The Tamizhaga Rajiv Congress (TRC) was a regional political party in the Indian state of Tamil Nadu. It was founded by Vazhapadi K. Ramamurthy following his split from the Indian National Congress after 1996s. The party participated in state and national elections, at times aligning with larger coalitions such as the National Democratic Alliance.

== History ==
Vazhapadi K. Ramamurthy, a senior Tamil Nadu Congress leader, broke away following internal disagreements within the state Congress organisation. He launched the Tamizhaga Rajiv Congress to mobilise Congress-leaning voters and establish an independent political position in Tamil Nadu.

The TRC contested state elections and took part in coalition politics during the late 1990s. Despite its limited organisational structure, the party briefly played a role in alliance negotiations at the national level.

=== Merger with the Indian National Congress ===
In 2002, Ramamurthy formally merged the Tamizhaga Rajiv Congress back into the Indian National Congress, effectively dissolving the party.

== See also ==
- Vazhapadi K. Ramamurthy
- Politics of Tamil Nadu
