= Tamil Nadu Toilers' Party =

- Abbreviation: TTP
- Founder: S. S. Ramasami Padayatchiyar
- Founded: 1951
- Colours: Tomato

Tamil Nadu Toilers Party was created by members of the populous Vanniyar community of Tamil Nadu, India, during the 1950s. In 1951, Vanniyars convened a conference of the Vanniyar Kula Kshatriya Sanga which intended to organise Vanniyars on a statewide basis. It failed due to traditional local loyalties. S. S. Ramasami Padayachi, chairman of the Cuddalore Municipal school and member of the South Arcot district board, led the Vanniyars of South Arcot and Salem in forming the Tamil Nadu Toilers Party (TTP) while M. A. Manickavelu Naicker, a lawyer, led those from North Arcot and Chengalpattu in the creation of the Commonweal Party.

N. D. Govindaswamy Kachirayar, A. Jayaraman, V. Muniswami and V. Boorarangaswami Padayachi of TTP won four seats in the 1952 Indian general election.
