= Vandavasi Assembly constituency =

State Legislative Assembly Constituency in Tamil Nadu

Coordinates: 12.5°N 79.62°E

Vandavasi
- Constituency No. 69 for the Tamil Nadu Legislative Assembly

Constituency details
- Country: India
- Region: South India
- State: Tamil Nadu
- District: Tiruvannamalai
- Lok Sabha constituency: Arani
- Established: 1951
- Total electors: 2,13,574
- Reservation: SC

Member of Legislative Assembly
- 17th Tamil Nadu Legislative Assembly
- Incumbent S. Ambethkumar
- Party: DMK
- Elected year: 2026

Vandavasi is a state legislative assembly constituency in Tiruvannamalai district of the Indian state of Tamil Nadu. Its State Assembly Constituency number is 69. The seat is reserved for candidates from the Scheduled Castes and comprises a portion of Vandavasi taluk. It is a part of Arani Lok Sabha constituency for national elections to the Parliament of India. It is one of the 234 State Legislative Assembly Constituencies in Tamil Nadu, in India.

== Members of Legislative Assembly ==
Year	Member	Political party
Madras State
1952 (Note: 2-member constituency)	Dasarathan	All India Scheduled Castes Federation
1952	Somasundara Gounder	Commonweal Party
1957 (Note: 2-member constituency)	D. Dasarathan	Indian National Congress
1957	M. Ramachandra Reddy	Indian National Congress
1962	S. Muthulingam	Dravida Munnetra Kazhagam
1967	S. Muthulingam	Dravida Munnetra Kazhagam
Tamil Nadu
1971	V. Rajagopal	Dravida Munnetra Kazhagam
1977	P. Munuswamy	All India Anna Dravida Munnetra Kazhagam
1980	C. Kuppusamy	All India Anna Dravida Munnetra Kazhagam
1984	A. Arumugam	Indian National Congress
1989	V. Dhanaraj	Dravida Munnetra Kazhagam
1991	C. K. Tamizharasan	All India Anna Dravida Munnetra Kazhagam
1996	Bala Anandan	Dravida Munnetra Kazhagam
2001	K. Murugavelrajan	Pattali Makkal Katchi
2006	S. P. Jayaraman	Dravida Munnetra Kazhagam
2009 (Note: by-election)	Kamalakannan	Dravida Munnetra Kazhagam
2011	V. Gunaseelan	All India Anna Dravida Munnetra Kazhagam
2016	S. Ambethkumar	Dravida Munnetra Kazhagam
2021	S. Ambethkumar	Dravida Munnetra Kazhagam
2026	S. Ambethkumar	Dravida Munnetra Kazhagam

== Election results ==
Vote share of winning candidates
2026	33.37%
2021	55.41%
2016	44.20%
2011	52.05%
2006	53.29%
2001	49.14%
1996	59.97%
1991	53.34%
1989	43.54%
1984	53.29%
1980	50.21%
1977	41.11%
1971	63.85%
1967	61.25%
1962	64.57%
1957	28.13%
1952	31.02%

=== 2026 ===
2026 Tamil Nadu Legislative Assembly election: Vandavasi
Party	Candidate	Votes	%	±%
DMK	Ambethkumar S	63,805	33.37	▼22.04
AIADMK	Rani P	60,472	31.63	New
TVK	Udhayakumar M	58,174	30.43	New
NTK	Ganesh R	5,495	2.87	▼2.17
NOTA	NOTA	988	0.52	▼0.44
Margin of victory		3,333	1.74	▼17.78
Turnout		1,91,204	89.53	▲12.95
Registered electors		2,13,574		▼26,959
DMK hold		Swing	▼22.04	

=== 2021 ===
2021 Tamil Nadu Legislative Assembly election: Vandavasi
Party	Candidate	Votes	%	±%
DMK	S. Ambethkumar	102,064	55.41	+11.21
PMK	S. Murali	66,111	35.89	+22.51
NTK	G. Prabavathi	9,284	5.04	New
NOTA	NOTA	1,769	0.96	−0.37
AMMK	P. Venkatesan	1,728	0.94	New
MNM	S. Suresh	1,692	0.92	New
Independent	K. Manikandan	1,264	0.69	New
Margin of victory		35,953	19.52	9.56
Turnout		184,205	76.58	−5.00
Rejected ballots		347	0.19	
Registered electors		240,533		
DMK hold		Swing	11.21	

=== 2016 ===
2016 Tamil Nadu Legislative Assembly election: Vandavasi
Party	Candidate	Votes	%	±%
DMK	S. Ambethkumar	80,206	44.20	−0.28
AIADMK	V. Meganathan	62,138	34.24	−17.81
PMK	Vadivel Ravanan	24,277	13.38	New
VCK	M. K. Metharamesh	7,745	4.27	New
NOTA	NOTA	2,421	1.33	New
IJK	J. Sudha	1,079	0.59	New
Margin of victory		18,068	9.96	2.38
Turnout		181,476	81.58	−0.02
Registered electors		222,453		
DMK gain from AIADMK		Swing	-7.85	

=== 2011 ===
2011 Tamil Nadu Legislative Assembly election: Vandavasi
Party	Candidate	Votes	%	±%
AIADMK	V. Gunaseelan	84,529	52.05	+17.23
DMK	J. Kamalakkannan	72,233	44.48	−8.81
Independent	A. Devendiran	2,020	1.24	New
BSP	T. Ponnan	1,112	0.68	New
BJP	K. Rajasekar	1,090	0.67	−0.57
Margin of victory		12,296	7.57	−10.89
Turnout		162,399	81.60	10.82
Registered electors		199,026		
AIADMK gain from DMK		Swing	-1.24	

=== 2006 ===
2006 Tamil Nadu Legislative Assembly election: Vandavasi
Party	Candidate	Votes	%	±%
DMK	S. P. Jayaraman	65,762	53.29	+11.96
AIADMK	M. Chakkrapani	42,974	34.82	New
DMDK	N. Siva Shanmugam	9,096	7.37	New
Independent	S. Jayaraman	1,895	1.54	New
BJP	K. Rajasekar	1,535	1.24	New
SP	M. Mohan	684	0.55	New
Independent	M. Masilamani	673	0.55	New
Margin of victory		22,788	18.46	10.65
Turnout		123,414	70.77	7.42
Registered electors		174,376		
DMK gain from PMK		Swing	4.14	

=== 2001 ===
2001 Tamil Nadu Legislative Assembly election: Vandavasi
Party	Candidate	Votes	%	±%
PMK	K. Murugavelrajan	55,773	49.14	New
DMK	K. Loganathan	46,902	41.33	−18.64
Independent	N. K. Jayavindhiyaraj	3,822	3.37	New
MDMK	V. Rajagopal	2,832	2.50	+0.48
Independent	P. Lakshmanan	1,790	1.58	New
Independent	R. Anbumani	998	0.88	New
Independent	G. Sivakumar	863	0.76	New
Margin of victory		8,871	7.82	−28.42
Turnout		113,490	63.35	−5.27
Registered electors		179,151		
PMK gain from DMK		Swing	-10.82	

=== 1996 ===
1996 Tamil Nadu Legislative Assembly election: Vandavasi
Party	Candidate	Votes	%	±%
DMK	Bala Anandan	65,775	59.97	+34.73
AIADMK	V. Gunaseelan	26,029	23.73	−29.61
Independent	A. V. Devaraj	13,496	12.30	New
MDMK	V. Rajagopal	2,214	2.02	New
BJP	M. Murugesan	1,362	1.24	New
Margin of victory		39,746	36.24	8.14
Turnout		109,686	68.62	1.21
Registered electors		169,850		
DMK gain from AIADMK		Swing	6.63	

=== 1991 ===
1991 Tamil Nadu Legislative Assembly election: Vandavasi
Party	Candidate	Votes	%	±%
AIADMK	C. K. Thamizharasan	55,990	53.34	+35.41
DMK	V. Rajagopal	26,496	25.24	−18.3
PMK	G. Murthy	21,649	20.62	New
Independent	C. Kistan	839	0.80	New
Margin of victory		29,494	28.10	10.70
Turnout		104,974	67.41	11.42
Registered electors		162,559		
AIADMK gain from DMK		Swing	9.79	

=== 1989 ===
1989 Tamil Nadu Legislative Assembly election: Vandavasi
Party	Candidate	Votes	%	±%
DMK	V. Dhanaraj	35,264	43.54	+1.61
INC	T. S. Govindan	21,176	26.15	−27.14
AIADMK	C. Senguttuvan	14,522	17.93	New
AIADMK	Pon. Munusamy	7,962	9.83	New
Independent	M. Govindarajan	1,421	1.75	New
Independent	K. M. Saminathan	524	0.65	New
Margin of victory		14,088	17.40	6.03
Turnout		80,988	55.99	−18.12
Registered electors		147,671		
DMK gain from INC		Swing	-9.75	

=== 1984 ===
1984 Tamil Nadu Legislative Assembly election: Vandavasi
Party	Candidate	Votes	%	±%
INC	A. Arumugham	48,712	53.29	New
DMK	V. Rajagopal	38,326	41.93	−5.04
Independent	R. Malgova	1,219	1.33	New
Independent	E. Kuppan	1,217	1.33	New
Independent	C. Krishnan	532	0.58	New
Independent	D. Panneerselvam	525	0.57	New
INC(J)	M. V. Arumugham	474	0.52	New
Margin of victory		10,386	11.36	8.13
Turnout		91,406	74.11	11.69
Registered electors		130,211		
INC gain from AIADMK		Swing	3.08	

=== 1980 ===
1980 Tamil Nadu Legislative Assembly election: Vandavasi
Party	Candidate	Votes	%	±%
AIADMK	C. Kuppusami	38,501	50.21	+9.11
DMK	C. Kanniappan	36,019	46.97	+8.53
JP	Ashok Iiayaraja	1,178	1.54	New
Independent	A. Mohanavelu	570	0.74	New
Independent	D. Radhakrishnan	410	0.53	New
Margin of victory		2,482	3.24	0.58
Turnout		76,678	62.41	4.20
Registered electors		124,733		
AIADMK hold		Swing	9.11	

=== 1977 ===
1977 Tamil Nadu Legislative Assembly election: Vandavasi
Party	Candidate	Votes	%	±%
AIADMK	P. Munuswamy	28,306	41.11	New
DMK	C. Kanniappan	26,476	38.45	−25.41
JP	A. Kumaraswamy	10,034	14.57	New
Independent	M. Saminathan	2,071	3.01	New
RPI	A. Arumugam	820	1.19	New
Independent	S. Muthulingam	682	0.99	New
Margin of victory		1,830	2.66	−25.05
Turnout		68,862	58.22	−11.73
Registered electors		119,981		
AIADMK gain from DMK		Swing	-22.75	

=== 1971 ===
1971 Tamil Nadu Legislative Assembly election: Vandavasi
Party	Candidate	Votes	%	±%
DMK	V. Rajagopal	41,452	63.85	+2.6
INC	D. Dasarathan	23,465	36.15	+2.37
Margin of victory		17,987	27.71	0.23
Turnout		64,917	69.95	−0.67
Registered electors		95,562		
DMK hold		Swing	2.60	

=== 1967 ===
1967 Madras Legislative Assembly election: Vandavasi
Party	Candidate	Votes	%	±%
DMK	Muthulingam	38,626	61.25	−3.32
INC	A. Adineelam	21,300	33.78	−1.65
RPI	C. Kuppusami	1,903	3.02	New
Independent	M. Karunaiprakasam	1,231	1.95	New
Margin of victory		17,326	27.48	−1.67
Turnout		63,060	70.62	9.23
Registered electors		93,447		
DMK hold		Swing	-3.32	

=== 1962 ===
1962 Madras Legislative Assembly election: Vandavasi
Party	Candidate	Votes	%	±%
DMK	S. Muthulingam	34,922	64.57	New
INC	D. Dasarathan	19,160	35.43	+7.29
Margin of victory		15,762	29.14	21.94
Turnout		54,082	61.39	−37.69
Registered electors		92,928		
DMK gain from INC		Swing	36.44	

=== 1957 ===
1957 Madras Legislative Assembly election: Vandavasi
Party	Candidate	Votes	%	±%
INC	M. Ramachandra Reddy	44,610	28.13	5.99
Independent	A. Dharma Gounder	33,185	20.93	
INC	D. Dasarathan (SC)	22,187	13.99	−8.15
Independent	S. Muthuilingam (ST)	15,747	9.93	
Independent	Ettippa Gounder	12,965	8.18	
Independent	Ramasamy (SC)	7,941	5.01	
Independent	Kerunaiprakasam (SC)	6,187	3.90	
Independent	Govindaraju (SC)	6,081	3.83	
Independent	Damodaram (SC)	5,170	3.26	
Independent	Perumal (SC)	4,494	2.83	
Margin of victory		11,425	7.21	−1.67
Turnout		1,58,567	99.09	5.72
Registered electors		1,60,030		
INC gain from Commonweal Party		Swing	-2.89	

=== 1952 ===
1952 Madras Legislative Assembly election: Vandavasi
Party	Candidate	Votes	%	±%
Commonweal Party	Somasundara Gounder	41,975	31.02	
INC	Ramanuja Reddiar	29,962	22.14	22.14
RPI	Dasaratham	29,115	21.52	
INC	Velayuthapani	23,557	17.41	17.41
Independent	Subramania Iyer	10,714	7.92	
Margin of victory		12,013	8.88	
Turnout		1,35,323	93.37	
Registered electors		1,44,937		
Commonweal Party win (new seat)				
