= Bala Anandan =

Indian politician

Bala Anandan (born 1923 - November 2, 2017) an Indian politician and was a Member of the Legislative Assembly. He was elected to the Tamil Nadu legislative assembly as a Dravida Munnetra Kazhagam (DMK) candidate from Vandavasi constituency in the 1996 election. The constituency was reserved for candidates from the Scheduled Castes.
