= S. S. Ramasami Padayatchiyar =

Indian politician

Member of Parliament, Lok Sabha
- In office 18 January 1980 – 27 November 1989
- Prime Minister: Indira Gandhi, Rajiv Gandhi
- Preceded by: M. R. Lakshmi Narayanan
- Succeeded by: R. Ramadass
- Constituency: Thindivanam

Minister of Local Administration, Tamil Nadu
- In office 13 April 1954 – 13 April 1957
- Chief Minister: K. Kamaraj
- Preceded by: N. Sankara Reddi
- Succeeded by: Lourdammal Simon
- Constituency: Cuddalore

Personal details
- Born: 16 September 1918
- Died: 3 April 1992 (aged 73)
- Party: Tamil Nadu Toilers' Party; Indian National Congress
- Spouse: Papa Ammal
- Profession: Politician

S. S. Ramasami Padayatchiyar (16 September 1918 – 3 April 1992) was a politician from the Indian state of Tamil Nadu. He was the founder of the Tamil political party Tamil Nadu Toilers' Party.

== Early life ==
Padayatchiyar was born in a Vanniyar family at the South Arcot district of Madras Presidency on 16 September 1918. He studied till high school and did not pursue further education. He entered politics and founded the Tamil Nadu Toilers Party in 1951.

== Tamil Nadu Toilers Party ==
Tamil Nadu Toilers Party was created by Padayatchiyar and members of the Vanniyar caste during the 1950s. In 1951, Vanniyars convened a major conference of the Vanniyar Kula Kshatriya Sangam. M. A. Manickavelu Naicker, a lawyer and S. S. Ramasami Padayatchi, 33-year-old high school graduate, chairman of the Cuddalore Municipal school and member of the South Arcot district board were participants of the conference among others. The conference which intended to organise Vanniyars on a statewide basis failed due to traditional local loyalties. South Arcot and Salem Vanniyars under Padayatchiyar's leadership formed Tamil Nadu Toilers Party whereas Vanniyars from North Arcot and Chengalpattu under Naicker formed Commonweal Party. The partnership of Tamil Nadu Toilers Party and Commonweal Party ensured success in 25 MLA constituencies and 4 members of parliament, after which a problem in Madras legislative assembly on 1954 came to a solution to take referendum in assembly for Indian National Congress to prove its majority to form government, where Kamaraj of INC was supported by S.S. Ramaswamy Padayatchiyar and Manickavelu Naicker to become Chief Minister of Madras presidency.

== In the Madras Legislative Assembly ==
Padayatchiyar was unsure over the choice of alliances. However, initially, he was highly skeptical of the Indian National Congress and criticized the Commonweal Party for establishing an alliance with the Congress. But he significantly modified his stance when C. Rajagopalachari resigned as the Chief Minister of Madras state. He proposed negotiations with Rajaji's successor K. Kamaraj and eventually, merged his party with the Congress accepting an appointment as Minister of Local Self-Government.

During the 1962 elections, Padayatchiyar quit the Congress and revived the Tamil Nadu Toilers Party. He concluded an alliance with the Swatantra Party and contested the elections as an ally of the Swarajya Party. However, Tamil Nadu Toilers Party performed poorly in the 1962 elections and Padayatchiyar himself lost his seat. During the 1967 elections, Padayatchiyar approached the Dravida Munnetra Kazhagam offering his support. But the DMK rebuffed him saying that there were enough candidates from the Vanniyar community in the DMK and the support of the Tamil Nadu Toilers Party would not be needed. The DMK performed well in the elections and captured power in the state.

== As Member of Parliament ==
After a brief lull, Padayatchiyar returned to politics in 1980. He returned to the Indian National Congress and contested in the Lok Sabha elections from Tindivanam and was elected to the lower house of Indian Parliament. Padayatchiyar was re-elected in 1984 and served from 1980 to 1989.

== Philanthropy ==
He donated several acres of his land for public railways, government hospitals, and the bus terminal in Cuddalore.

== Memorial for Padayatchiyar ==
In memory of Padayatchiyar a portrait was unveiled in Tamil Nadu Legislative Assembly. To honour Padayatchiyar and his Social Justice Service, on 29 June 2018 Chief Minister of Tamil Nadu Edappadi K. Palaniswami announced in the Assembly that Padayatchiyar birth anniversary on September 16 would be officially celebrated as Government Function. And also announced that a Memorial for Padayatchiyar would be built at Cuddalore. Edappadi K Palaniswami on 14 Sep 2018 laid the foundation for the Memorial at Manjakuppam in Cuddalore, through video conferencing at the secretariat. The memorial was opened on 25 November 2019 by Chief Minister of Tamil Nadu Edappadi K. Palaniswami in 1.5-acre land in the heart of the Cuddalore city with a life-size bronze statue of the late leader, also with a library at a cost of 2.15 crore.

== Family ==
Siva Shidambara Ramasamy Padaiyatchiyar was born on 16 September 1918 in Soorappanaickanchavadi Village, Cuddalore(Backside of Cuddalore Bus Stand) South Arcot District of the Madras Presidency to the couple Siva Shidambaram Padaiyatchi and Rathinambal. He had four brothers and one sister. His family belonged to a traditional agrarian background and had been engaged in agriculture for generations. He has two sons and one daughter. On September 3, 1942, he married Gnanammal alias Pappammal as his life partner. In their married life, they had three children, one woman and two men. S.S.R. Ramadass, Daughter S.S.R. Bhanumathi and S.S.R. Mantrikumar

== Death ==
Ramasami Padayatchiyar died on 3 April 1992 at Cuddalore.

== See also ==
- M. A. Manickavelu Naicker
- S. Ramadoss

== Notes ==
Preceded by None	President of the Tamil Nadu Toilers' Party; 1951–1954; 1962–1980	Succeeded by None
Preceded by	Member of the Madras Legislative Assembly; 1951–1962	Succeeded by
Preceded by N. Sankara Reddi	Minister of Local Administration (Madras state); 1954–1957	Succeeded by Lourdhammal Simon
Preceded by N. R. Lakshminarayanan	Member of Indian Parliament (Lok Sabha) for Tindivanam; 1980–1989	Succeeded by R. Eramadass
