= Vandavasi Lok Sabha constituency =

Former constituency of the Indian parliament in Tamil Nadu

Coordinates: 12.5°N 79.62°E

Vandavasi
- Former Lok Sabha constituency
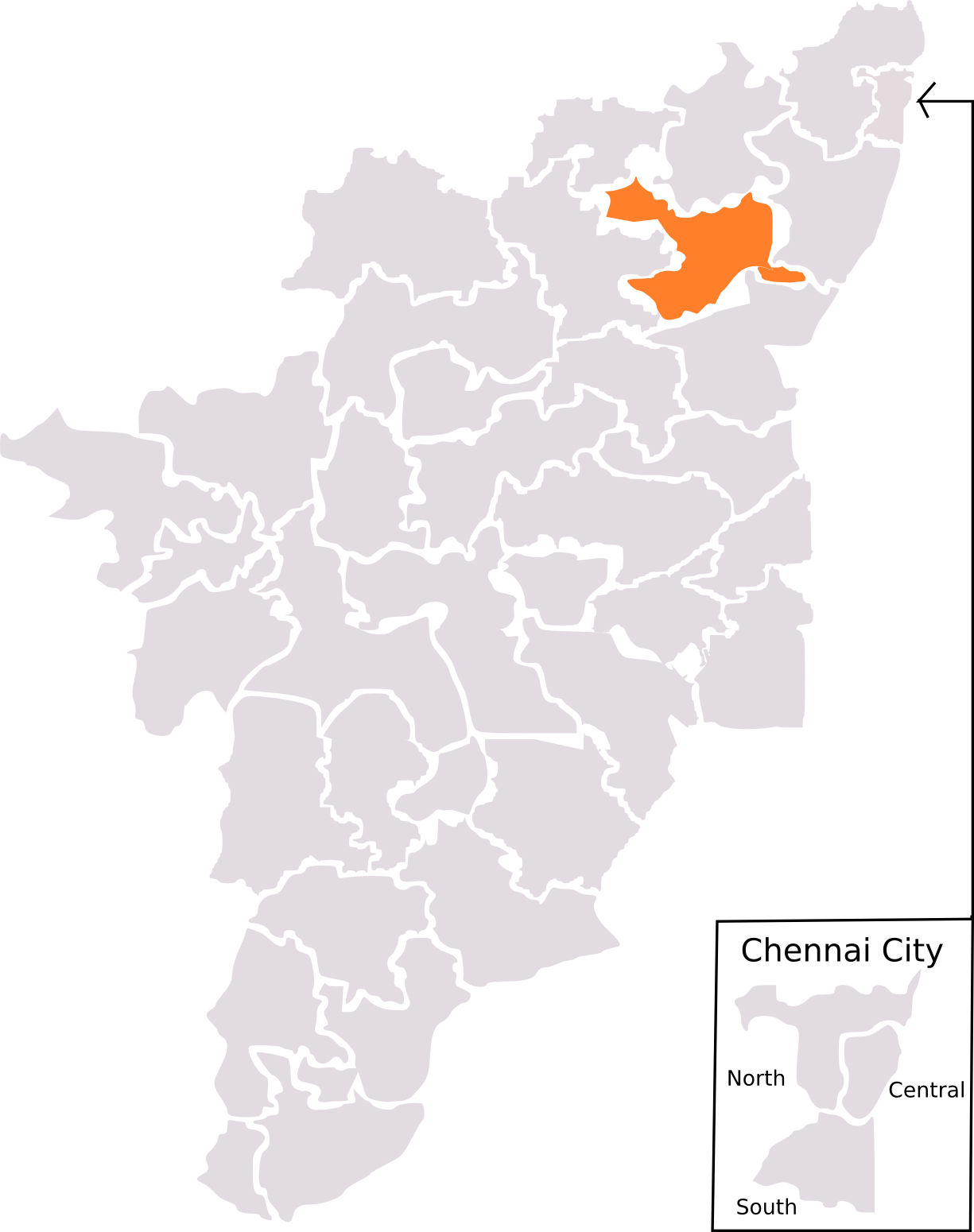
- Vandavasi constituency, 1971 delimitation.

Constituency details
- Country: India
- Region: South India
- State: Tamil Nadu
- Established: 1962
- Abolished: 2009
- Total electors: 12,13,662
- Reservation: None

Vandavasi was a Lok Sabha (Parliament of India) constituency in Tamil Nadu. After delimitation in 2009, it is defunct.

== Assembly segments ==
Vandavasi Lok Sabha constituency was composed of the following assembly segments:

1. Tiruvannamalai (moved to Tiruvannamalai constituency)
2. Polur (moved to Arani constituency)
3. Vandavasi (SC) (moved to Arani constituency)
4. Peranamallur (defunct)
5. Melmalayanur (defunct)
6. Gingee (moved to Arani constituency)

== Members of Parliament ==
Year	Name	Party
1962	A.Jayaraman	Indian National Congress
1967	G Viswanathan	Dravida Munnetra Kazhagam
1971	G Viswanathan	Dravida Munnetra Kazhagam
1977	Venugopal	All India Anna Dravida Munnetra Kazhagam
1980	D. Pattuswamy	Indian National Congress (I)
1984	L Balaraman	Indian National Congress
1989	L Balaraman	Indian National Congress
1991	M. Krishnasamy	Indian National Congress
1996	L Balaraman	Tamil Maanila Congress (Moopanar)
1998	M. Durai	Pattali Makkal Katchi
1999	M. Durai	Pattali Makkal Katchi
2004	N. Ramachandran Gingee	Marumalarchi Dravida Munnetra Kazhagam

== Election results ==
Vote share of Winning candidates
2004	56.12%
1999	50.8%
1998	49.0%
1996	47.7%
1991	53.7%
1989	46.2%
1984	59.4%
1980	61.0%
1977	57.0%
1971	55.9%
1967	53.0%
1962	37.7%

=== 2004 ===
2004 Indian general elections: Vandavasi
Party	Candidate	Votes	%	±%
MDMK	Gingee N. Ramachandran	394,903	56.12	n/a
AIADMK	Rajalakshmi R.	243,470	34.60	n/a
JD(U)	Punniyakotti P.	23,609	3.36	n/a
Independent	Vinayagam S.	14,473	2.06	n/a
Majority		151,433	21.52	+12.81
Turnout		703,669	62.35	+0.80
MDMK gain from PMK		Swing	+56.12	

=== General Election 1999 ===
Party	Candidate	Votes	%
PMK	M.Durai	345,539	50.8%
INC	M.Krishnasamy	286,342	42.1%
TMC(M)	K.Wahab	36,844	5.4%
Majority		59,197	8.7%
Turnout		679,992	61.5%
PMK Hold			

=== General Election 1998 ===
Party	Candidate	Votes	%
PMK	M.Durai	327,010	49.0%
TMC(M)	L.Balaramam	261,935	39.3%
INC	M.Krishnasamy	34,827	5.2%
IND	Karuppasamy	21,219	3.2%
IND	G.S.Chandrabose	545	0.1%
Majority		65,075	9.8%
Turnout		667,287	62.0%
PMK gain from TMC(M)			

=== General Election 1996 ===
Party	Candidate	Votes	%
TMC(M)	L.Balaraman	342,184	47.7%
INC	M.Krishnasamy	168,880	23.5%
PMK	P.Senthamizhan	106,388	14.8%
MDMK	A.Chinnadurai	39,449	5.5%
BJP]]	4,986	0.7%	
Majority		173,306	24.1%
Turnout		717,844	69.6%
TMC(M) gain from INC			

=== General Election 1991 ===
Party	Candidate	Votes	%
INC	M.Krishnasamy	354451	53.7%
DMK	D.Venugopal	177,356	26.8%
PMK	Kasilanga Durai	99,163	15.0%
IND	K.Pandurangam	2,519	0.4%
Ambedkar Makkal Iyakkam	K.V.Murugesan	2,382	0.4%
IND	S.Appadurai	2,232	0.3%
Majority		177,095	26.8%
Turnout		660,560	68.0%
INC Hold			

=== General Election 1989 ===
Party	Candidate	Votes	%
INC	L.Balaraman	313,160	46.2%
DMK	D.Venugopal	212,988	31.4%
PMK	Kasilingam	128,318	18.9%
IND	K.Punithavathi	3,476	0.5%
Tharasu Makkal Mandram	S.Manavalan	3,005	0.4%
Majority		100,172	14.8%
Turnout		677,686	69.3%
INC Hold			

=== General Election 1984 ===
Party	Candidate	Votes	%
INC	L.Balaraman	341,267	59.4%
DMK	R.K.Pandian	206,375	35.9%
Majority		134,892	23.5%
Turnout		574,975	75.3%
INC Hold			

=== General Election 1980 ===
Party	Candidate	Votes	%
INC	D.Pattusamy	285,549	61.0%
AIADMK	Venugopal Gounder	158,395	33.8%
INC(U)	R.A.Natrajan	5,327	1.1%
Majority		127,154	27.2%
Turnout		468,039	65.5%
INC gain from INC			

=== General Election 1977 ===
Party	Candidate	Votes	%
AIADMK	Venugopal Gounder	267,930	57.0%
DMK	Duraimurugan	186,798	39.7%
IND	JagaDeva gounder	4,010	0.9%
Majority		81,132	17.2%
Turnout		470,355	68.6%
AIADMK gain from DMK			

=== General Election 1971 ===
Party	Candidate	Votes	%
DMK	G.Viswanathan	230,003	55.9%
INC(O)	M.K.Gounder	182,659	45.7%
IND	Maniazhilan	25,114	6.1%
IND	J.P.Ganesa Mudhaliar	2,897	0.7%
Majority		87,955	21.4%
Turnout		411,640	76.3%
DMK Hold			

=== General Election 1967 ===
Party	Candidate	Votes	%
DMK	G.Vishwanathan	213,537	53.0%
INC	M.K.Gounder	132,878	33.0%
IND	P.S.Gounder	31,008	7.7%
IND	K.M.K.Nayagar	8,998	2.2%
Majority		80,659	20.0%
Turnout		386,421	73.8%
DMK gain from INC			

=== General Election 1962 ===
Party	Candidate	Votes	%
INC	Jayaraman	111,053	37.7%
RPI	M.Krishnasami	100,256	34.0%
SWP	Pulavar Mani	57,190	19.4%
IND	Gangadaran	13,414	4.5%
Majority		10,797	3.7%
Turnout		281,913	67.7%
INC Win (New Seat)			

== See also ==
- Vandavasi
- List of constituencies of the Lok Sabha
