= K. Dhanaraju =

Indian politician

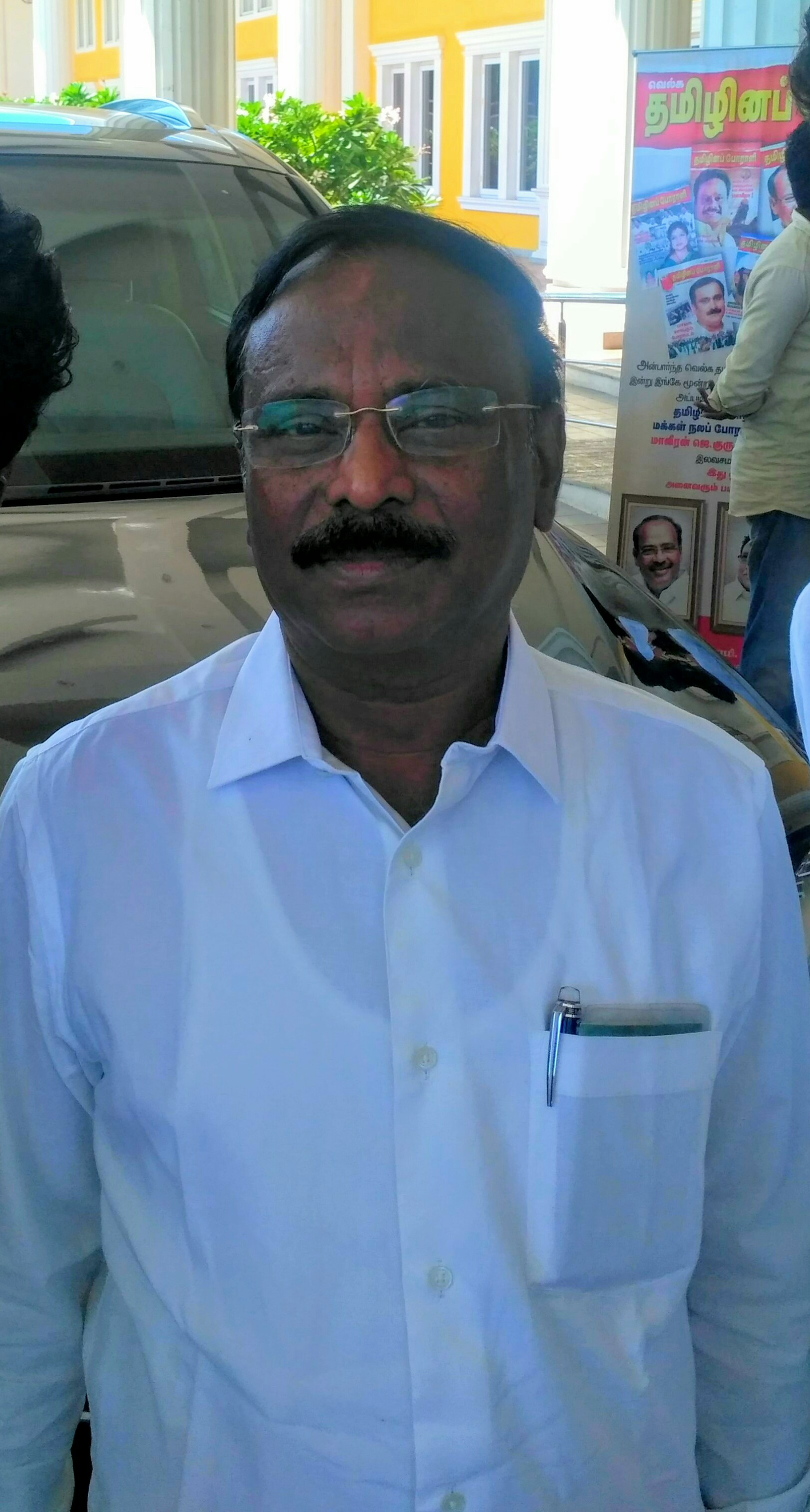

Member of Parliament
- In office 17 May 2004 – 18 May 2009
- Preceded by: N. Ramachandran Gingee
- Constituency: Tindivanam

Personal details
- Born: 3 August 1956 (age 69) Villupuram, Tamil Nadu
- Party: PMK
- Spouse: Gunavathi Dhanaraju
- Children: 2 sons; Gunanidhi, Sabareesh
- As of 22 September, 2006

K. Dhanaraju (born 3 August 1956) was an Indian politician, who was a member of the 14th Lok Sabha of India. He represented the Tindivanam constituency of Tamil Nadu. He hails from Pattali Makkal Katchi (PMK) political party. He also serves as the Convener of the Puducherry unit of PMK.

== Early life and education ==
He received an M.Sc. from Annamalai University in 1979, an M.H.Ed. from Annamalai University in 1980, an M.Ed. from Annamalai University in 1983, an M.Phil. from the University of Madras in 1986. He completed a Ph.D. from Pondicherry University in 1998. He is a teacher and agriculturist by profession.

== Career ==
He was elected to the 14th Lok Sabha as a Member of Parliament from the Tindivanam parliamentary constituency, serving from 17 May 2004 to 18 May 2009. During his tenure, he held several key positions, including:

- Member of the Standing Committee on Transport, Tourism, and Culture
- Member of the Consultative Committee, Ministry of Agriculture and Ministry of Consumer Affairs, Food and Public Distribution
- Member of the informal Consultative Committee, Ministry of Railways
- Member of the Parliamentary Forum on Water Conservation and Management

== Personal life ==
He married Gunavathi Dhanaraju in 1988. They have two sons.
