= M. R. Lakshmi Narayanan =

Indian politician

- In office 15 March 1971 – 18 January 1977
- Prime Minister: Indira Gandhi
- Preceded by: T. D. R. Naidu
- Constituency: Tindivanam
- Prime Minister: Moraji Desai
- In office 23 March 1977 – 22 August 1979
- Succeeded by: S. S. Ramasami Padayachi

Personal details
- Born: Cuddalore, Madras Presidency
- Party: Congress
- Spouse: Saraswathy
- Children: 1 daughter

M. R. Lakshmi Narayanan was an Indian politician and former Member of Parliament elected from Tamil Nadu. He was elected to the Lok Sabha from Tindivanam constituency as an Indian National Congress candidate in 1971 and 1977 elections.

== Early life ==
M. R. Lakshmi Narayanan was born in Reddiar family in Cuddalore.

== Political career ==
M. R. Lakshmi Narayanan joined the congress party and contested in the 1971 general elections. He won in the 1971 elections and represented Tindivanam in the Lok Sabha. Then he also contested in the 1977 general elections and represented Tindivanam again.

== Personal life ==
M. R. Lakshmi Narayanan married Saraswathy and had one daughter.
