= D. Pattuswamy =

Indian politician

D. Pattuswamy Mudaliar is an Indian politician, textile merchant and former Member of parliament, Lok Sabha from Vandavasi constituency as an Indian National Congress (I) candidate in 1980 election. He was born in Kaikolar family in Tiruvannamalai district.
