= Gingee N. Ramachandran =

Indian politician

N. Ramachandran Gingee
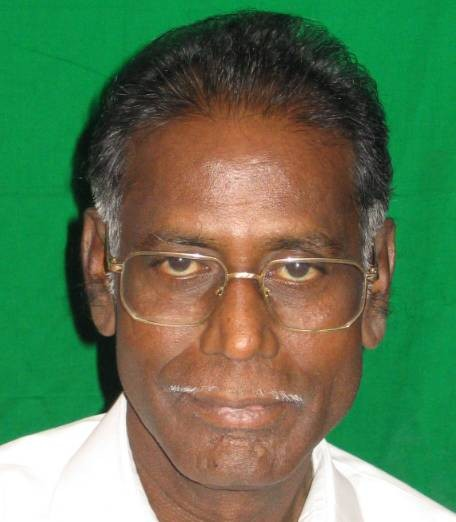
- Ramachandran in 1998

Union Minister of State for Textiles
- In office 8 September 2003 — 30 December 2003
- Prime Minister: Atal Bihari Vajpayee
- In office 13 October 1999 — 30 September 2000
- Prime Minister: Atal Bihari Vajpayee

Union Minister of State for Finance and Company Affairs
- In office 30 September 2000 — 24 May 2003
- Prime Minister: Atal Bihari Vajpayee

Member of Parliament, Lok Sabha
- In office 16 May 2004 — 16 May 2009
- Preceded by: M. Durai
- Succeeded by: constituency abolished
- Constituency: Vandavasi
- In office 10 March 1998 — 16 May 2004
- Preceded by: T. G. Venkatraman
- Succeeded by: K. Dhanaraju
- Constituency: Tindivanam

Personal details
- Born: 3 June 1944 (age 81) Aviyur, Viluppuram district, Madras Presidency, British India (Now Tamil Nadu)
- Party: All India Anna Dravida Munnetra Kazhagam
- Other political affiliations: Dravida Munnetra Kazhagam; Marumalarchi Dravida Munnetra Kazhagam
- Spouse: R. Dhanalakshmi
- Children: 1 sons and 2 daughters
- As of 22 September, 2023

Gingee N. Ramachandran (born 3 June 1944) is an Indian politician. He was elected to the Lok Sabha, lower house of the Parliament of India as member of the Marumalarchi Dravida Munnetra Kazhagam.He was the Union Minister of State, Textiles and Finance & Company Affairs in Vajpayee Ministry.He joined the AIADMK in the presence of Jayalalitha in 2014.

== Position Held ==
Date / Period	Position / Details
2004	Re-elected to 14th Lok Sabha (3rd term); Member, Committee on Transport, Tourism and Culture; Chairman, Railway Convention Committee (17 Sept 2004); Member, Committee on Commerce (5 Aug 2006 onwards)
8 Sept 2003 – 30 Dec 2003	Union Minister of State, Ministry of Textiles
29 Jan 2003 – 24 May 2003	Union Minister of State, Finance and Company Affairs
30 Sept 2000 – 29 Jan 2003	Union Minister of State, Finance
13 Oct 1999 – 30 Sept 2000	Union Minister of State, Textiles
1999	Re-elected to 13th Lok Sabha (2nd term)
1998–99	Elected to 12th Lok Sabha (Tindivanam Lok Sabha constituency); Chairman, Joint Committee on Salaries and Allowances of Members of Parliament; Member, General Purposes Committee; Member, Committee on Defence; Member, Consultative Committee, Ministry of Railways
1989	Chairman, Committee on Petitions; Tamil Nadu Legislative Assembly
1985–1990	Chairman, Vallam Panchayat Union; Villupuram District
1977–1990	Member, Tamil Nadu Legislative Assembly (three terms); Gingee Assembly constituency (1977–80), (1980–84), (1989–91)
1978–1993	District Secretary, Dravida Munnetra Kazhagam (DMK); Villupuram District, Tamil Nadu
1973–1978	Secretary, Vallam Panchayat Union (DMK)
1970–1978	President, Aviyur Panchayat Samiti; Villupuram District, Tamil Nadu
1970–1976	Joint Organiser, DMK Party (Student Wing)
