= G. Venkatraman =

Indian politician

Tindivanam Gopala Venkatraman
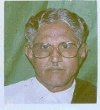

Union Minister of Surface Transport
- In office 1 June 1996 – 19 March 1998
- Prime Minister: H. D. Deve Gowda; Inder Kumar Gujral
- Preceded by: Atal Bihari Vajpayee
- Succeeded by: Sedapatti R. Muthiah

Union Minister of Urban Affairs and Employment
- In office 14 November 1997 – 10 December 1997
- Prime Minister: Inder Kumar Gujral
- Preceded by: Ummareddy Venkateswarlu
- Succeeded by: Ummareddy Venkateswarlu

Member of Parliament, Lok Sabha
- In office 10 May 1996 — 3 March 1998
- Preceded by: K. Rama Murthee
- Succeeded by: Gingee N. Ramachandran
- Constituency: Tindivanam

Member of Parliament, Rajya Sabha
- In office 25 July 1989 – 24 July 1995
- Constituency: Tamil Nadu

Personal details
- Born: February 2, 1931 Tindivanam, Villupuram district, Tamil Nadu
- Died: February 21, 2013 (aged 82)
- Party: Dravida Munnetra Kazhagam
- Spouse: Vasantha
- Occupation: Politician

Tindivanam Gopala Venkatraman (2 February 1931 – 21 February 2013) was an Indian politician who was a member of the D.M.K. Party.

== Early life ==
Tindivanam G. Venkatraman was born in Tindivanam, in Villupuram district on 2 February 1931. His father was Shri V. Gopala Gounder. He belonged to the Vanniyar Gounder community. He married Smt. V. Vasantha on 8 May 1960 and had three sons and one daughter. He gained a B.A. degree at Annamalai University, Chidambaram and a B.L. at Law College, Madras University, Madras (Tamil Nadu).

He worked as Junior Advocate with Late Mr. Narayanasami Mudaliar (former Law Minister of Tamil Nadu) at chennai and later was practicing as an advocate at Tindivanam and throughout South Arcot district.

He died on 21 February 2013 at the age of 82.

== Political life ==
He was a D.M.K. party member and activist. Contested for Legislative Assembly Elections in 1977 for D.M.K and lost to T.R. Erajaram Reddy INC.

He was elected to the Rajya Sabha in 1989 and served till 1995. He contested for the Lok Sabha elections representing D.M.K and got elected to the eleventh Lok Sabha in 1996, defeating his nearest rival Mr. Tindivanam. K. Ramamurthy (INC) with a whooping margin of 190, 276 votes. He was appointed Union Cabinet Minister of Surface Transport (Independent charge).

== Positions held ==
- 1978–85 – Member, General Council, D.M.K.
- 1989–95 – Elected to Rajya Sabha
- 1989–90 – Member, Consultative Committee, Ministry of Textiles
- 1990–91 – Member, Consultative Committee, Ministry of Steel and Mines
- 1992–94 – Member, Committee on Petitions
- 1993–94 – Member, Committee on Subordinate Legislation
- 1996–98 – Elected to Lok Sabha (Eleventh)
- 1996–98 – Union Cabinet Minister, Surface Transport

== Social and cultural activities ==
- Member, Trust Board for Vannia Kula Kshatriya Thirumana Mandapam, 1980 onwards;
- donor for a prize to backward class students in Govt. Arts College, Tindivanam, 1980 onwards
