= L. Balaraman =

Indian politician (1932–2002)

L. Balaraman (4 January 1932 – 26 February 2002) was an Indian politician and Member of Parliament elected from Tamil Nadu. He was elected to the Lok Sabha from the Vandavasi constituency as an Indian National Congress (INC) candidate in the 1984 and 1989 elections, and as a Tamil Maanila Congress (Moopanar) candidate in the 1996 election.

He was born in Mottupalayam village in Vellore District. It is nearby Vellore City. His grandfather Varadha Gounder was the landlord in the village.

He also served as the Member of the Legislative Assembly of Tamil Nadu. He was elected to the Tamil Nadu legislative assembly from Kaniyambadi constituency as an INC candidate in the 1967 election and from Polur constituency as an Indian National Congress (I) candidate in the 1980 election. He has serves as a member of Legislative council (MLC) from1971-1976. He was the first chairman of Kaniyambadi Union.

Balaraman died on 26 February 2002 in Vellore.
