= M. A. Manickavelu Naicker =

Indian politician

M. Alagappa Manickavelu Naicker

Member of Indian Parliament (Rajya Sabha)
- In office 3 April 1962 – 15 April 1964
- Prime Minister: Jawaharlal Nehru

Minister of Revenue (Madras state)
- In office 10 April 1952 – 3 April 1962
- Premier: C. Rajagopalachari, K. Kamaraj
- Preceded by: H. Sitarama Reddi
- Succeeded by: R. Venkataraman

Personal details
- Born: 14 December 1896
- Died: 25 July 1996 (aged 99)
- Party: Swarajya Party (till 1934), Commonweal Party (1951-1954), Indian National Congress(from 1954 onwards)
- Profession: Politician

M. Alagappa Manickavelu Naicker (14 December 1896 – 25 July 1996) or simply, M. A. Manickavelu was an Indian politician of the Indian National Congress and founder of the Commonweal Party. He served as the Minister of Revenue for the Madras state from 1952 to 1962. He also served as a member of the Rajya Sabha from 1962 to 1964. During 1964-70 he was the Chairman (presiding officer) of the Tamil Nadu Legislative Council.

== Early life ==
Manickavelu was born to M. Alagappa Naicker on 14 December 1896. Alagappa belonged to numerically strong Vanniyar community of Tamil Nadu. Manickavelu graduated in arts and proceeded to qualify as a lawyer. Manickavelu entered politics early in life and became a member of the Swarajya Party faction of the Indian National Congress. In 1926, he was elected to the Madras Legislative Council.Manickavelu served as a member of the Madras Legislative Council from 1926 to 1937.

== Commonweal Party ==
In 1951, Naicker founded the Commonweal Party which represented Vanniyar interests in Chingleput and North Arcot districts. In 1951, he contested in the 1951 elections, the first held in independent India as a candidate of the Commonweal Party, an ally of the DMK, and was elected to the assembly once again. Naicker was appointed Minister of Land Revenue and served from 1953 to 1962. When Rajagopalachari stepped down as Chief Minister and was succeeded by Kamaraj, Naicker dissolved the Commonweal Party and merged his organisation with the Indian National Congress. He served as a member of the Madras Legislative Assembly till 1962 when he was elected to the upper house of India's Parliament, the Council of States. He served as a member of the Council of States from 1962 to 1964.

== Death ==
Manickavelu Naicker died in Madras on 25 July 1996, less than five months short of his 100th birthday.

== See also ==
- S. S. Ramasami Padayatchiyar

== Notes ==
Tamil Nadu Legislative Council
Preceded by	Member of the Madras Legislative Council; 1926-1937	Succeeded by
Party political offices
Preceded by None	President of the Commonweal Party; 1951-1954	Succeeded by None
Tamil Nadu Legislative Assembly
Preceded by	Member of the Madras Legislative Assembly for Polur; 1952-1967	Succeeded by S. M. Annamalai
Preceded by	Member of the Madras Legislative Assembly for Thuriniapuram; 1957-1962	Succeeded by
Political offices
Preceded by H. Sitarama Reddi	Minister of Revenue (Madras state); 10 April 1952-3 April 1962	Succeeded by R. Venkataraman
Rajya Sabha
Preceded by	Member of Parliament for Rajya Sabha (Madras State); 3 April 1962-15 April 1964	Succeeded by
Political offices
Preceded by P. V. Cherian	Presiding Officer of the Tamil Nadu Legislative Council; 1964-1970	Succeeded by C. P. Chitrarasu
