= Tindivanam K. Ramamurthy =

Indian politician (1934–2021)

Tindivanam K. Ramamurthy (British Raj, 5 April 1934 – 8 August 2021) was an Indian politician from Tamil Nadu. He was a member of the Indian National Congress and served as the Secretary/General Secretary of Tamil Nadu P.C.C. (1967–78). He was a member of the Tamil Nadu Legislative Assembly (1967–71) and Tamil Nadu Legislative Council (1976-84) where he was the Leader of the Opposition (1981–84). He was a nominated member of the Rajya Sabha from 1984 to 1990.

== Death ==
K. Ramamurthy died at Chennai on 8 August 2021 due to age-related illness.

== Sources ==
- Brief Biodata
