= Commonweal Party =

- Founder: M. A. Manickavelu Naicker
- Founded: 1951
- Dissolved: 1954
- Merged into: Indian National Congress
- Colours

Commonweal Party was an Indian political party in Tamil Nadu that existed from 1951 to 1954. It was started by M. A. Manickavelu Naicker and claimed to represent the interests of the Vanniyar caste. It merged with Indian National Congress in 1954. The party won three seats in the 1952 Lok Sabha election and six seats in the Madras State legislative assembly elections.
